= List of Montreal Expos broadcasters =

Broadcasters for the Montreal Expos Major League Baseball team.

== English ==
=== Television ===
Year	Network	Play-by-play	Color commentator(s)	References
1969	CBC	Hal Kelly	Jim Hearn	
1970	CBC	Hal Kelly	Don Drysdale	
1971	CBC	Dave Van Horne	Don Drysdale	
1972	CBC	Dave Van Horne	Pee Wee Reese, Jackie Robinson, Bobby Bragan, or Mickey Mantle	
1973	CBC	Dave Van Horne	Duke Snider	
1974	CBC	Dave Van Horne	Duke Snider	
1975	CBC	Dave Van Horne	Duke Snider	
1976	CBC	Dave Van Horne	Duke Snider	
1977	CBC	Dave Van Horne	Duke Snider	
1978	CBC	Dave Van Horne	Duke Snider	
1979	CBC	Dave Van Horne	Duke Snider	
1980	CBC	Dave Van Horne	Duke Snider	
1981	CBC	Dave Van Horne	Duke Snider	
1982	CBC	Dave Van Horne	Duke Snider	
1983	CBC	Dave Van Horne	Duke Snider	
1984	CBC	Dave Van Horne	Duke Snider	
1985	CBC	Dave Van Horne	Duke Snider	
1985	TSN	Tommy Hutton	Ken Singleton	
1986	CBC	Dave Van Horne	Duke Snider	
1986	TSN	Tommy Hutton	Ken Singleton	
1987	TV Labatt	Dave Van Horne	Ken Singleton	
1987	TSN	Jim Hughson	Ken Singleton	
1988	CBC/TV Labatt	Dave Van Horne	Jim Fanning	
1988	TSN	Jim Hughson	Ken Singleton	
1989	CTV	Dave Van Horne	Ken Singleton	
1989	TSN	Jim Hughson	Ken Singleton	
1990	CTV/TSN	Dave Van Horne	Ken Singleton	
1990	CBC	Dave Van Horne	Ken Singleton	
1991	CTV/TSN	Dave Van Horne	Ken Singleton	
1991	CBC	Dave Van Horne	Ken Singleton	
1992	CTV/TSN	Dave Van Horne	Ken Singleton	
1993	CTV/TSN	Dave Van Horne	Ken Singleton	
1994	TSN	Dave Van Horne	Ken Singleton	
1995	TSN	Dave Van Horne	Ken Singleton	
1996	TSN	Dave Van Horne	Ken Singleton or Mike Stenhouse ^{1}	
1997	TSN	Dave Van Horne	Gary Carter	
1998	TSN	Dave Van Horne	Gary Carter	
1999	TSN	Dave Van Horne	Gary Carter	
2000	None	None	None	
2001	TSN	Vic Rauter	Warren Sawkiw	
2002	None	None	None	
2003	None	None	None	
2004	The Score	Sam Cosentino	Warren Cromartie or Darrin Fletcher	

=== Radio ===
Year	Flagship station	Primary announcers	Secondary announcer(s)^{2}	References
1969	CKGM	Dave Van Horne and Russ Taylor		
1970	CFCF	Dave Van Horne and Russ Taylor		
1971	CFCF	Dave Van Horne and Russ Taylor	Various	
1972	CFCF	Dave Van Horne and Russ Taylor	Various	
1973	CFCF	Dave Van Horne and Russ Taylor	Various	
1974	CFCF	Dave Van Horne and Russ Taylor	Various	
1975	CFCF	Dave Van Horne and Russ Taylor	Various	
1976	CFCF	Dave Van Horne and Russ Taylor	Tom Cheek	
1977	CFCF	Dave Van Horne and Duke Snider	Russ Taylor and Ron Reusch	
1978	CFCF	Dave Van Horne and Duke Snider	Ron Reusch and Ted Tevan	
1979	CFCF	Dave Van Horne and Duke Snider	Ron Reusch and Ted Tevan	
1980	CFCF	Dave Van Horne and Duke Snider	Ron Reusch and Ted Blackman	
1981	CFCF	Dave Van Horne and Duke Snider	Ron Reusch and Tommy Hutton	
1982	CFCF	Dave Van Horne and Duke Snider	Ron Reusch and Tommy Hutton	
1983	CFCF	Dave Van Horne and Duke Snider	Ron Reusch and Tommy Hutton	
1984	CFCF	Dave Van Horne and Duke Snider	Ron Reusch and Tommy Hutton	
1985	CFCF	Dave Van Horne and Duke Snider	Ron Reusch and Tommy Hutton	
1986	CFCF	Dave Van Horne and Duke Snider	Ron Reusch and Tommy Hutton	
1987	CFCF	Dave Van Horne and Jim Fanning	Rob Faulds	
1988	CFCF	Dave Van Horne and Jim Fanning	Rob Faulds and Richard Griffin	
1989	CJAD	Dave Van Horne and Jerry Trupiano	Bobby Winkles	
1990	CJAD	Dave Van Horne and Jerry Trupiano	Bobby Winkles	
1991	CFCF	Dave Van Horne and Ken Singleton	Elliott Price and Bobby Winkles	
1992	CIQC	Dave Van Horne and Ken Singleton	Elliott Price and Bobby Winkles	
1993	CIQC	Dave Van Horne and Ken Singleton	Elliott Price and Bobby Winkles	
1994	CIQC	Dave Van Horne and Ken Singleton	Elliott Price and Richard Griffin	
1995	CIQC	Dave Van Horne and Ken Singleton	Elliott Price and Mike Stenhouse	
1996	CIQC	Dave Van Horne and Ken Singleton or Mike Stenhouse ^{1}	Elliott Price and Mike Stenhouse or Marc Griffin ^{1}	
1997	CIQC	Dave Van Horne and Joe Cannon	Elliott Price	
1998	CIQC	Dave Van Horne and Joe Cannon	Elliott Price	
1999	CIQC	Dave Van Horne and Joe Cannon	Elliott Price	
2000	MLB.com	Dave Van Horne and Joe Cannon		
2001	CKGM	Elliott Price and Terry Haig		
2002	CKGM	Elliott Price and Terry Haig		
2003	CKGM	Elliott Price and various announcers^{3}		
2004	CKGM	Elliott Price and various announcers^{3}		

== French ==
=== Television ===
Year	Network	Play-by-play	Color commentator(s)	References
1969	Radio-Canada	Guy Ferron	Raymond Lebrun or Jean-Pierre Roy	
1970	Radio-Canada	Guy Ferron	Jean-Pierre Roy	
1971	Radio-Canada	Guy Ferron	Jean-Pierre Roy	
1972	Radio-Canada	Guy Ferron	Jean-Pierre Roy	
1973	Radio-Canada	Guy Ferron	Jean-Pierre Roy	
1974	Radio-Canada	Guy Ferron	Jean-Pierre Roy	
1975	Radio-Canada	Guy Ferron	Jean-Pierre Roy	
1976	Radio-Canada	Guy Ferron	Jean-Pierre Roy	
1977	Radio-Canada	Guy Ferron	Jean-Pierre Roy	
1978	Radio-Canada	Guy Ferron	Jean-Pierre Roy	
1979	Radio-Canada	Guy Ferron	Jean-Pierre Roy	
1980	Radio-Canada	Guy Ferron	Jean-Pierre Roy	
1981	Radio-Canada	Guy Ferron	Jean-Pierre Roy	
1982	Radio-Canada	Raymond Lebrun	Jean-Pierre Roy	
1983	Radio-Canada	Raymond Lebrun	Jean-Pierre Roy	
1984	Radio-Canada	Raymond Lebrun	Claude Raymond	
1985	Radio-Canada	Raymond Lebrun	Claude Raymond	
1986	Radio-Canada	Raymond Lebrun	Claude Raymond	
1987	Radio-Canada	Raymond Lebrun	Claude Raymond	
1988	Radio-Canada	Raymond Lebrun	Claude Raymond	
1989	Radio-Canada	Raymond Lebrun	Claude Raymond	
1989	RDS	Denis Casavant	Claude Raymond	
1990	Radio-Canada	Raymond Lebrun	Claude Raymond	
1990	RDS	Denis Casavant	Rodger Brulotte	
1991	Radio-Canada	Raymond Lebrun	Claude Raymond	
1991	RDS	Denis Casavant	Rodger Brulotte	
1992	Radio-Canada	Raymond Lebrun	Claude Raymond	
1992	RDS	Denis Casavant	Rodger Brulotte	
1993	Radio-Canada	Raymond Lebrun	Claude Raymond	
1993	RDS	Denis Casavant	Rodger Brulotte	
1994	Radio-Canada	Camille Dube	Claude Raymond	
1994	RDS	Denis Casavant	Rodger Brulotte	
1995	Radio-Canada	Camille Dube	Claude Raymond	
1995	TQS	Michel Villeneuve	Marc Griffin	
1995	RDS	Denis Casavant	Rodger Brulotte	
1996	Radio-Canada	Camille Dube	Claude Raymond	
1996	TQS	Michel Villeneuve	Marc Griffin	
1996	RDS	Denis Casavant	Rodger Brulotte	
1997	Radio-Canada	René Pothier	Claude Raymond	
1997	TQS	Michel Villeneuve	Marc Griffin	
1997	RDS	Denis Casavant	Rodger Brulotte	
1998	Radio-Canada	René Pothier	Claude Raymond	
1998	TQS	Michel Villeneuve	Marc Griffin	
1998	RDS	Denis Casavant	Rodger Brulotte	
1999	Radio-Canada	René Pothier	Claude Raymond	
1999	RDS	Denis Casavant	Rodger Brulotte	
2000	RDS	Denis Casavant	Jean St-Onge	
2001	RDS	Denis Casavant	Rodger Brulotte	
2002	RDS	Denis Casavant	Rodger Brulotte	
2003	RDS	Denis Casavant	Rodger Brulotte	
2004	RDS	Denis Casavant	Rodger Brulotte	

=== Radio ===
Year	Flagship station	Primary announcers	Secondary announcer(s)	References
1969	CKLM	Jean-Paul Sarault and Jean-Pierre Roy	Jacques Doucet	
1969	CKLM	Jean-Paul Sarault and Jean-Pierre Roy	Jacques Doucet	
1970	CKLM	Jean-Paul Sarault and Jean-Pierre Roy	Jacques Doucet	
1971	CKLM	Jean-Paul Sarault and Jean-Pierre Roy	Jacques Doucet	
1972	CKAC	Jacques Doucet and Jean-Pierre Roy	Ron Piché	
1973	CKAC	Jacques Doucet and Claude Raymond		
1974	CKAC	Jacques Doucet and Claude Raymond		
1975	CKAC	Jacques Doucet and Claude Raymond		
1976	CKAC	Jacques Doucet and Claude Raymond		
1977	CKAC	Jacques Doucet and Claude Raymond		
1978	CKAC	Jacques Doucet and Claude Raymond		
1979	CKAC	Jacques Doucet and Claude Raymond		
1980	CKAC	Jacques Doucet and Claude Raymond		
1981	CKAC	Jacques Doucet and Claude Raymond		
1982	CKAC	Jacques Doucet and Claude Raymond		
1983	CKAC	Jacques Doucet and Claude Raymond		
1984	CKAC	Jacques Doucet and Rodger Brulotte		
1985	CKAC	Jacques Doucet and Rodger Brulotte		
1986	CKAC	Jacques Doucet and Rodger Brulotte		
1987	CKAC	Jacques Doucet and Rodger Brulotte		
1988	CKAC	Jacques Doucet and Rodger Brulotte		
1989	CKAC	Jacques Doucet and Rodger Brulotte		
1990	CKAC	Jacques Doucet and Rodger Brulotte	Pierre Arsenault	
1991	CKAC	Jacques Doucet and Rodger Brulotte		
1992	CKAC	Jacques Doucet and Rodger Brulotte	Alain Chantelois	
1993	CKAC	Jacques Doucet and Rodger Brulotte	Alain Chantelois	
1994	CKAC	Jacques Doucet and Rodger Brulotte	Alain Chantelois	
1995	CKAC	Jacques Doucet and Rodger Brulotte	Alain Chantelois	
1996	CKAC	Jacques Doucet and Rodger Brulotte	Alain Chantelois	
1997	CKAC	Jacques Doucet and Rodger Brulotte	Alain Chantelois	
1998	CKAC	Jacques Doucet and Rodger Brulotte	Alain Chantelois	
1999	CKAC	Jacques Doucet and Rodger Brulotte	Alain Chantelois	
2000	CKAC	Jacques Doucet and Rodger Brulotte	Alain Chantelois	
2001	CKAC	Jacques Doucet and Claude Raymond or Marc Griffin		
2002	CKAC	Jacques Doucet and Marc Griffin		
2003	CKAC	Jacques Doucet and Marc Griffin		
2004	CKOO-FM	Jacques Doucet and Marc Griffin		

== Notes ==
1. Ken Singleton left the Expos in May 1996 to join the MLB on Fox. He was replaced by Mike Stenhouse. Marc Griffin filled-in on radio broadcasts when Stenhouse was calling games on television.
2. From 1971 to 1976, 1987, 1989 to 1990, and 1997 to 1999, the Expos had a secondary announcer for games Dave Van Horne called on television. From 1977 to 1986, 1988, and 1991 to 1996, the Expos had a secondary broadcast team for games when both radio announcers were on television.
3. During the 2003 and 2004 seasons, Elliott Price called home games in Montreal alongside Mitch Melnick. For road games, various former players and minor league announcers, including Tim Wallach, Bill Lee, Russ Langer, Brett Dolan, Rob Evans, Warren Cromartie, Mike Curto, Jim Tocco, and Rich Burk, called games with Price on a volunteer basis. Roberto Clemente Jr. called home games in Puerto Rico alongside Price in 2003, but the club used volunteer announcers for these games during the 2004 season.
