= 1998 Montreal Expos season =

1998 Montreal Expos
- League: National League
- Division: East
- Ballpark: Olympic Stadium
- City: Montreal
- Record: 65–97
- Divisional place: 4th
- Owners: Claude Brochu
- General managers: Jim Beattie
- Managers: Felipe Alou
- Television: The Sports Network (Dave Van Horne, Gary Carter) TQS (Michel Villeneuve, Marc Griffin); SRC (Claude Raymond, Rene Pothier); RDS Network (Denis Casavant, Rodger Brulotte)
- Radio: CIQC (Dave Van Horne, Joe Cannon, Elliott Price); CKAC (AM) (Jacques Doucet, Rodger Brulotte, Alain Chantelois)

The 1998 Montreal Expos season was the 30th season in franchise history.

== Offseason ==
- On November 18, 1997, the Expos sent Pedro Martínez to the Boston Red Sox for a player to be named later and Carl Pavano. The Boston Red Sox sent Tony Armas Jr on December 18, 1997, to complete the trade.
- December 12, 1997: Henry Rodriguez was traded by the Montreal Expos to the Chicago Cubs for Miguel Batista.

== Spring training ==
In 1998, the Expos held spring training at a new facility, Roger Dean Stadium in Jupiter, Florida, which opened that spring. They shared the facility with the St. Louis Cardinals.

== Regular season ==
=== Opening Day starters ===
- Shane Andrews
- Brad Fullmer
- Mark Grudzielanek
- Vladimir Guerrero
- Carlos Pérez
- F.P. Santangelo
- José Vidro
- Rondell White
- Chris Widger

=== Season standings ===
NL East
Team	W	L	Pct.	GB	Home	Road
Atlanta Braves	106	56	.654	—	56‍–‍25	50‍–‍31
New York Mets	88	74	.543	18	47‍–‍34	41‍–‍40
Philadelphia Phillies	75	87	.463	31	40‍–‍41	35‍–‍46
Montreal Expos	65	97	.401	41	39‍–‍42	26‍–‍55
Florida Marlins	54	108	.333	52	31‍–‍50	23‍–‍58

=== Record vs. opponents ===
1998 National League record Source: MLB Standings Grid – 1998
Team	AZ	ATL	CHC	CIN	COL	FLA	HOU	LAD	MIL	MON	NYM	PHI	PIT	SD	SF	STL	AL
Arizona	—	1–8	5–7	4–5	6–6	6–2	4–5	4–8	6–3	2–7	4–5	2–7	6–3	3–9	5–7	2–7	5–8
Atlanta	8–1	—	3–6	7–2	5–3	7–5	4–5	8–1	7–2	6–6	9–3	8–4	7–2	5–4	7–2	6–3	9–7
Chicago	7–5	6–3	—	6–5	7–2	7–2	4–7	4–5	6–6	7–2	4–5	3–6	8–3	5–4	7–3	4–7	5–8
Cincinnati	5–4	2–7	5–6	—	4–5	9–0	3–8	5–4	6–5	8–1	3–6	4–5	5–7	1–11	2–7	8–3	7-6
Colorado	6–6	3–5	2–7	5–4	—	6–3	6–5	6–6	4–7	7–2	3–6	5–4	5–4	5–7	7–5	3–6	4–8
Florida	2–6	5–7	2–7	0–9	3–6	—	3–6	4–5	0–9	5–7	5–7	6–6	3–6	4–5	0–9	4–5	8–8
Houston	5–4	5–4	7–4	8–3	5–6	6–3	—	3–6	9–2	7–2	5–4	7–2	9–2	5–4	6–3	5–7	10–4
Los Angeles	8–4	1–8	5–4	4–5	6–6	5–4	6–3	—	5–4	5–4	3–5	5–4	7–5	5–7	6–6	4–5	8–5
Milwaukee	3–6	2–7	6–6	5–6	7–4	9–0	2–9	4–5	—	6–3	1–8	4–5	6–5	3–6	5–4	3–8	8–6
Montreal	7–2	6–6	2–7	1–8	2–7	7–5	2–7	4–5	3–6	—	8–4	5–7	2–7	4–4	3–6	3–6	6–10
New York	5–4	3–9	5–4	6–3	6–3	7–5	4–5	5–3	8–1	4–8	—	8–4	4–5	4–5	4–5	6–3	9–7
Philadelphia	7-2	4–8	6–3	5–4	4–5	6–6	2–7	4–5	5–4	7–5	4–8	—	8–1	1–8	2–6	3–6	7–9
Pittsburgh	3–6	2–7	3–8	7–5	4–5	6–3	2–9	5–7	5–6	7–2	5–4	1–8	—	5–4	2–7	6–5	6–7
San Diego	9–3	4–5	4–5	11–1	7–5	5–4	4–5	7–5	6–3	4–4	5–4	8–1	4–5	—	8–4	6–3	6–7
San Francisco	7–5	2–7	3–7	7–2	5–7	9–0	3–6	6–6	4–5	6–3	5–4	6–2	7–2	4–8	—	7–5	8–5
St. Louis	7–2	3–6	7–4	3–8	6–3	5-4	7–5	5–4	8–3	6–3	3–6	6–3	5–6	3–6	5–7	—	4–9

Expos vs. American League
Team	AL East				
Team	BAL	BOS	NYY	TB	TOR
Montreal	3–0	0–3	1–2	2–1	0–4

=== Notable Transactions ===
- July 31, 1998: Ted Lilly was traded by the Los Angeles Dodgers with Jonathan Tucker (minors), Peter Bergeron, and Wilton Guerrero to the Montreal Expos for Carlos Pérez, Mark Grudzielanek, and Hiram Bocachica.

=== Roster ===
1998 Montreal Expos
Roster
Pitchers: 48 Miguel Batista; 21 Shayne Bennett; 31 Shawn Boskie; 38 Kirk Bullinger; 34 Rick DeHart; 30 Dustin Hermanson; 47 Mike Johnson; 44 Steve Kline; 51 Mike Maddux; 29 Trey Moore; 45 Carl Pavano; 33 Carlos Pérez; 49 Jeremy Powell; 32 Anthony Telford; 51 Mike Thurman; 41 Ugueth Urbina; 18 Marc Valdes; 28 Javier Vázquez; 43 Tim Young	Catchers: 5 Michael Barrett; 13,54 Bob Henley; 3 Mike Hubbard; 16 Chris Widger; Infielders: 11 Shane Andrews; 2 Orlando Cabrera; 20 Brad Fullmer; 4 Mark Grudzielanek; 4 Wilton Guerrero; 36 Ray Holbert; 24 Scott Livingstone; 6,9 Ryan McGuire; 15 Mike Mordecai; 37 José Vidro	Outfielders: 27 Vladimir Guerrero; 9 Terry Jones; 14 Derrick May; 12 Robert Pérez; 7 F. P. Santangelo; 33 Fernando Seguignol; 50 Da Rond Stovall; 22 Rondell White	Manager: 17 Felipe Alou; Coaches: 67 Pierre Arsenault (Bullpen); 26 Bobby Cuellar (Pitching); 1 Tommy Harper (Hitting); 25 Pete Mackanin (Third base); 55 Luis Pujols (First base); 23 Jim Tracy (Bench)

=== Scorecard for McGwire's 70th ===
Heading into the final game of the season vs. the Expos, Mark McGwire had 68 home runs. On September 27, 1998, McGwire finished the season with 70 home runs. In the third inning, McGwire hit a home run off Mike Thurman, and in the seventh inning, he got number 70 off Carl Pavano.

September 27, Busch Stadium, St. Louis, Missouri

Team	1	2	3	4	5	6	7	8	9	R	H	E
Montreal	0	0	2	1	0	0	0	0	0	3	9	1
St. Louis	1	1	1	0	0	0	3	0	x	6	9	2
W: Frascatore (3–4) L: Pavano (6–9) SV: Acevedo (15) HRs: Cabrera (3), Tatis (8), McGwire 2 (69, 70)
Attendance: 46,110 Time:2:33 U-HP–Rich Rieker, 1B–Joe West, 2B–Kerwin Danley, 3B–Brian Gorman

== Player stats ==
=== Batting ===
==== Starters by position ====
Note: Pos = Position; G = Games played; AB = At bats; H = Hits; Avg. = Batting average; HR = Home runs; RBI = Runs batted in

Pos	Player	G	AB	H	Avg.	HR	RBI
C	Chris Widger	125	417	97	.233	15	53
1B	Brad Fullmer	140	505	138	.273	13	73
2B	Wilton Guerrero	52	222	63	.284	2	20
SS	Mark Grudzielanek	105	396	109	.275	8	41
3B	Shane Andrews	150	492	117	.238	25	69
LF	F.P. Santangelo	122	382	82	.214	4	23
CF	Rondell White	97	357	107	.300	17	58
RF	Vladimir Guerrero	159	623	202	.324	38	109

==== Other batters ====
Note: G = Games played; AB = At bats; H = Hits; Avg. = Batting average; HR = Home runs; RBI = Runs batted in

Player	G	AB	H	Avg.	HR	RBI
Orlando Cabrera	79	261	73	.280	3	22
Terry Jones	60	212	46	.217	1	15
Ryan McGuire	130	210	39	.186	1	10
José Vidro	83	205	45	.220	0	18
Derrick May	55	180	43	.239	5	15
Mike Mordecai	73	119	24	.202	3	10
Bob Henley	41	115	35	.304	3	18
Scott Livingstone	76	110	23	.209	0	12
Robert Pérez	52	106	25	.236	1	8
DaRond Stovall	62	78	16	.205	2	6
Mike Hubbard	32	55	8	.145	1	3
Fernando Seguignol	16	42	11	.262	2	3
Michael Barrett	8	23	7	.304	1	2
Ray Holbert	2	5	0	.000	0	0

=== Starting pitchers ===
Note: G = Games pitched; IP = Innings pitched; W = Wins; L = Losses; ERA = Earned run average; SO = Strikeouts

Player	G	IP	W	L	ERA	SO
Dustin Hermanson	32	187.0	14	11	3.13	154
Javier Vázquez	33	172.1	5	15	6.06	139
Carlos Pérez	23	163.1	7	10	3.75	82
Carl Pavano	24	134.2	6	9	4.21	83
Mike Thurman	14	67.0	4	5	4.70	32
Trey Moore	13	61.0	2	5	5.02	35
Jeremy Powell	7	25.0	1	5	7.92	14
Shawn Boskie	5	17.2	1	3	9.17	10
Mike Johnson	2	7.1	0	2	14.73	4

==== Other pitchers ====
Note: G = Games pitched; IP = Innings pitched; W = Wins; L = Losses; ERA = Earned run average; SO = Strikeouts

Player	G	IP	W	L	ERA	SO
Miguel Batista	56	135.0	3	5	3.80	92

===== Relief pitchers =====
Note: G = Games pitched; W = Wins; L = Losses; SV = Saves; ERA = Earned run average; SO = Strikeouts

Player	G	W	L	SV	ERA	SO
Ugueth Urbina	64	6	3	34	1.30	94
Steve Kline	78	3	6	1	2.76	76
Anthony Telford	77	3	6	1	3.86	59
Shayne Bennett	62	5	5	1	5.50	59
Mike Maddux	51	3	4	1	3.72	33
Rick DeHart	26	0	0	1	4.82	14
Marc Valdes	20	1	3	0	7.43	28
Tim Young	10	0	0	0	6.00	7
Kirk Bullinger	8	1	0	0	9.00	2

== Award winners ==
1998 Major League Baseball All-Star Game

- Ugueth Urbina, pitcher

== Farm system ==
Level	Team	League	Manager
AAA	Ottawa Lynx	International League	Pat Kelly
AA	Harrisburg Senators	Eastern League	Rick Sweet
A	Jupiter Hammerheads	Florida State League	Doug Sisson
A	Cape Fear Crocs	South Atlantic League	Luis Dorante
A-Short Season	Vermont Expos	New York–Penn League	Tony Barbone
Rookie	GCL Expos	Gulf Coast League	Frank Kremblas

LEAGUE CHAMPIONS: Harrisburg
