= List of Washington Nationals seasons =

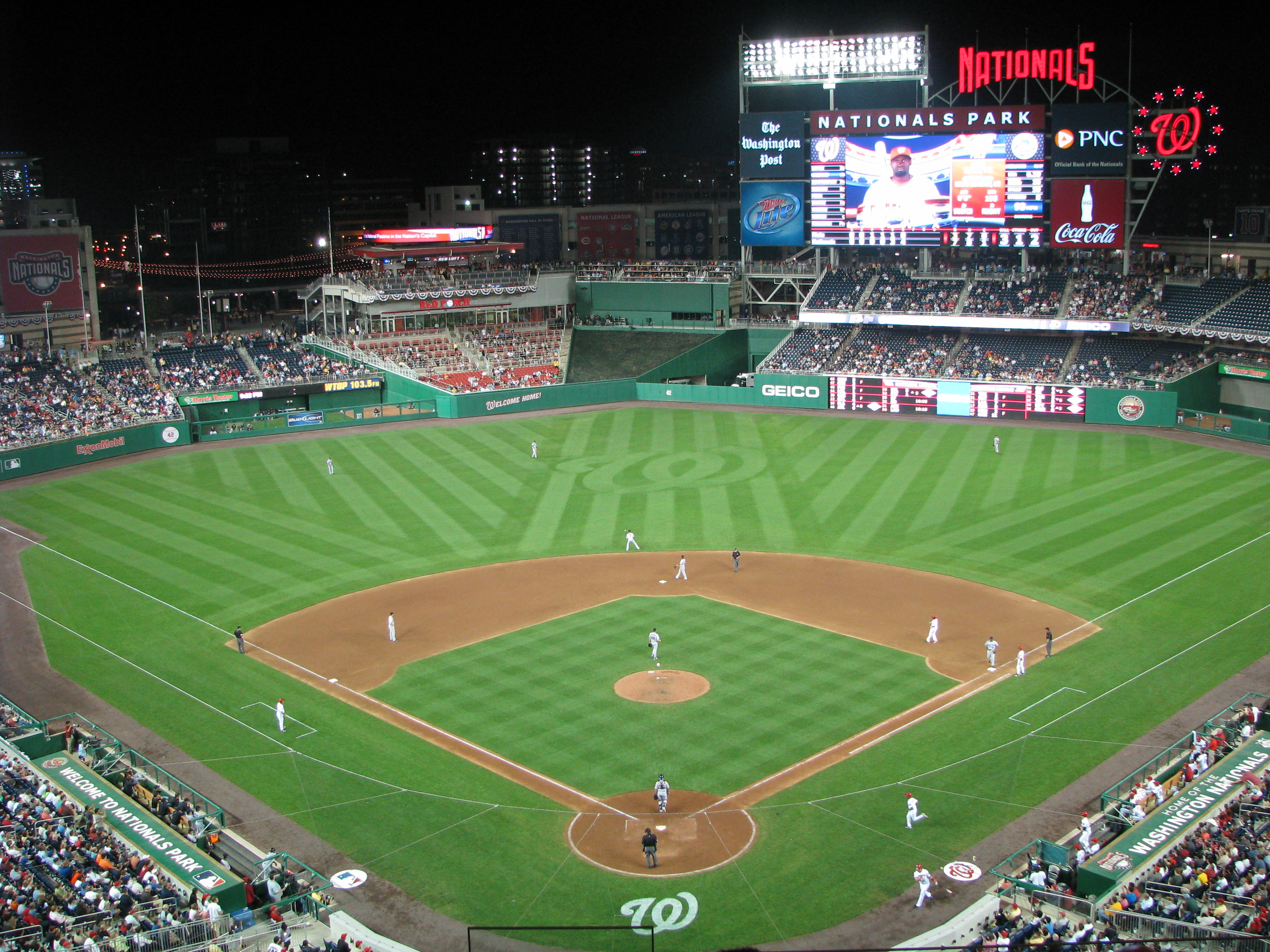
The Nationals have played at Nationals Park since 2008

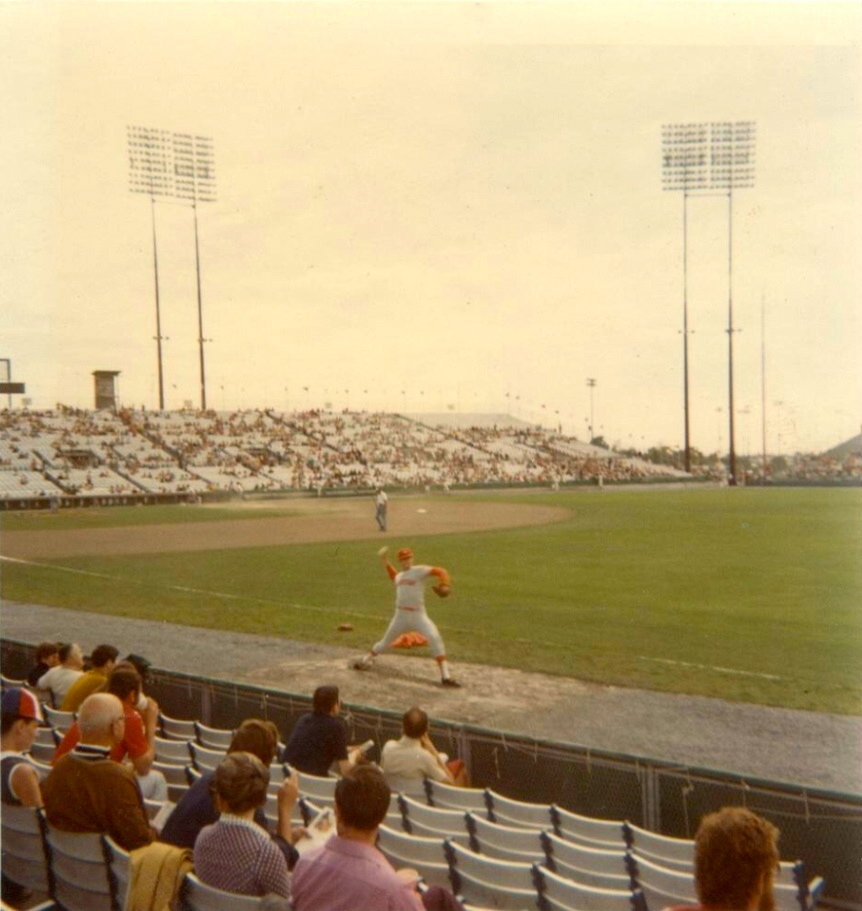
A 1971 view of Jarry Park Stadium, where the Expos played from 1969 to 1976

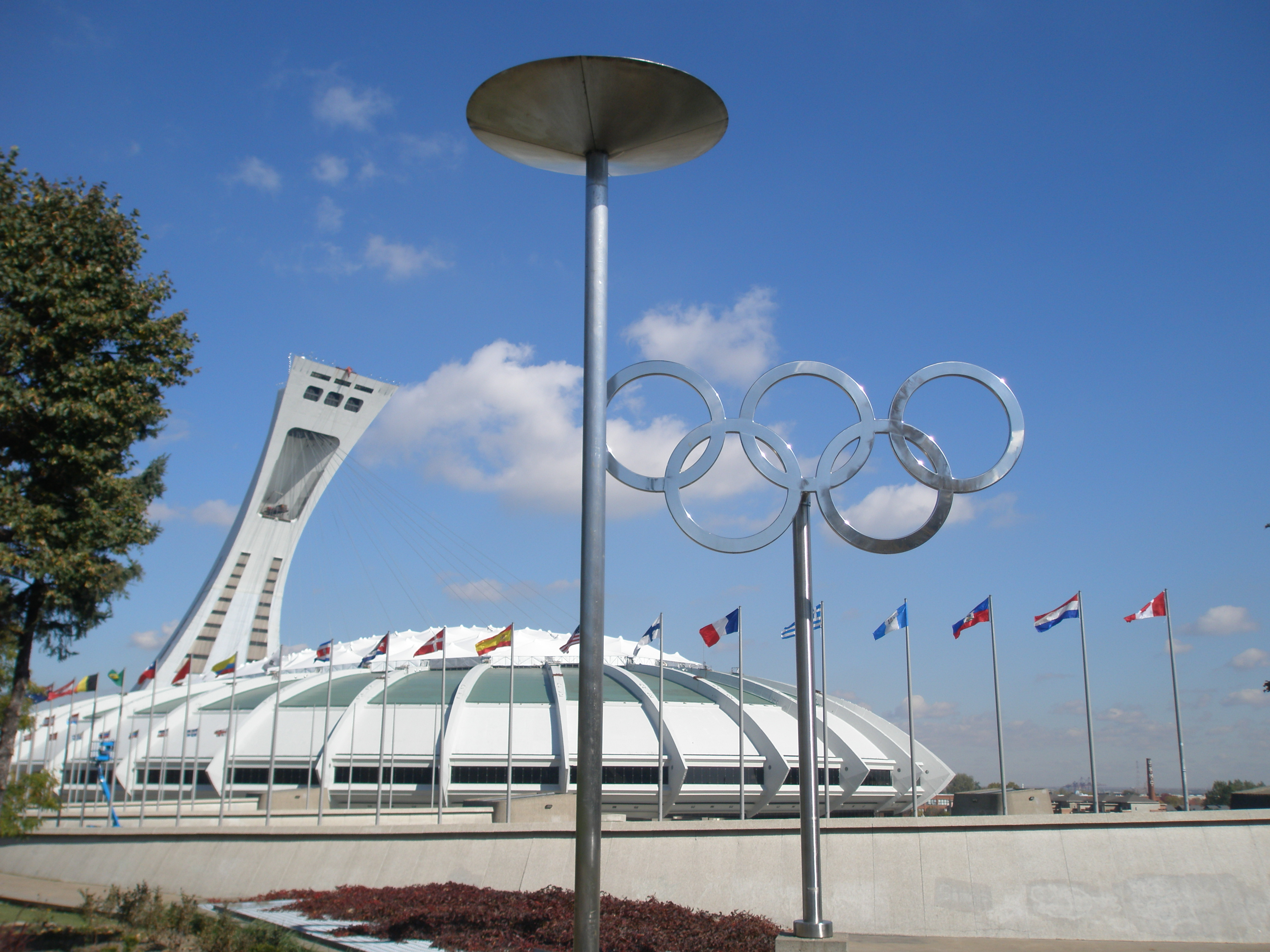
The Montreal Olympic Stadium, Canada home of the Expos from 1977 until their move to Washington after the 2004 season

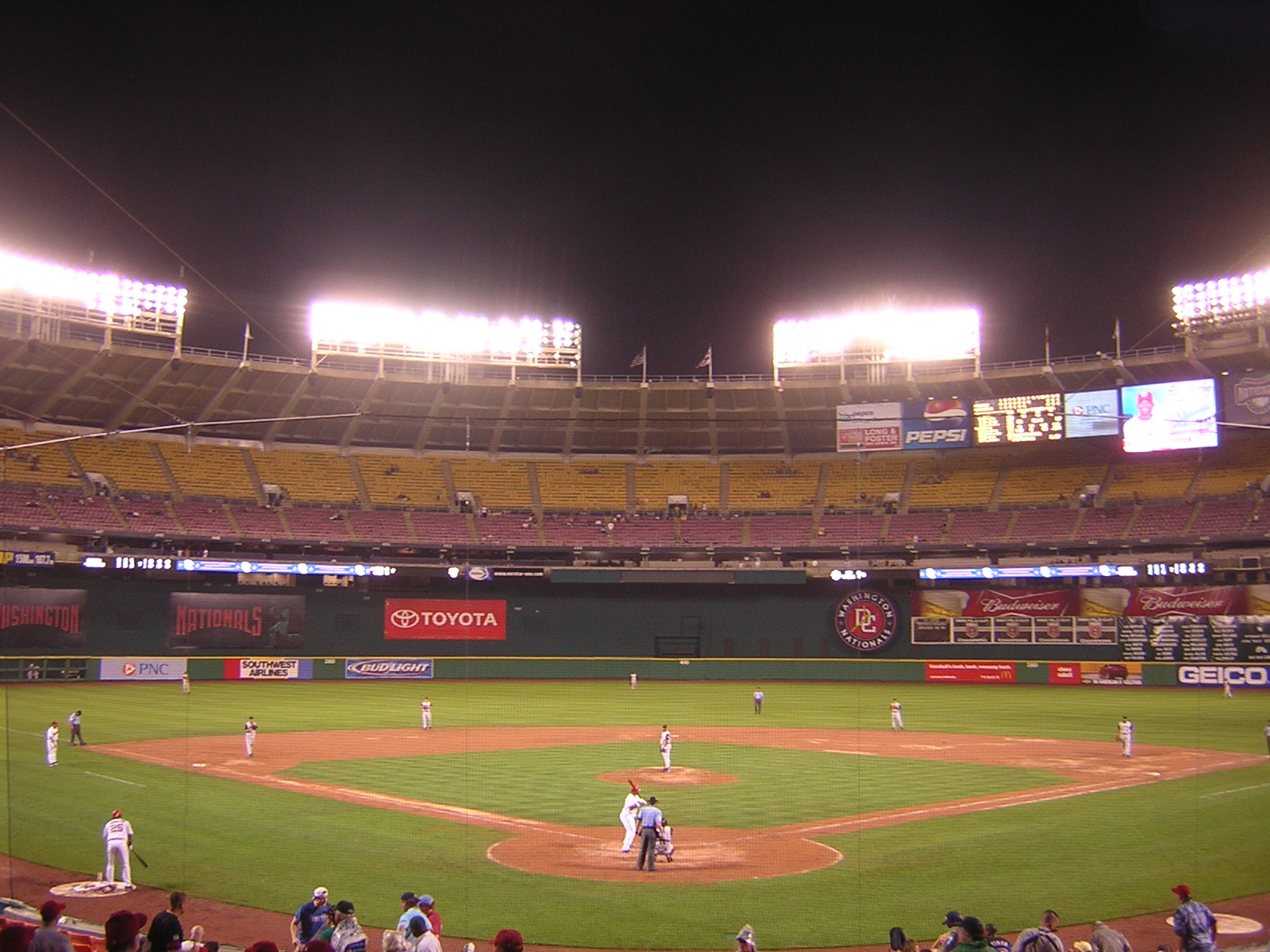
A Nationals game in June 2005 at Robert F. Kennedy Memorial Stadium, where the team played from 2005 to 2007

This is a list of seasons completed by the Washington Nationals, originally known as the Montreal Expos, professional baseball franchise; they have played in the National League from their inception in 1969. They are an American professional baseball team that has been based in Washington, D.C. since 2005. The Nationals are a member of Major League Baseball's (MLB) National League Eastern Division. Since the 2008 season, the Nationals have played in Nationals Park; from 2005 through 2007, the team played in Robert F. Kennedy Memorial Stadium.

As the Expos, the team had just fourteen of their 36 seasons finish with a winning record. The Expos made the postseason for the only time in 1981 as champions of the second half of the strike-shortened season. They then met the Philadelphia Phillies in the 1981 National League Division Series, defeating them in five games. They faced the Los Angeles Dodgers in the 1981 National League Championship Series but lost in five games. The 1994 team was 74–40 at the time of the league-wide strike that killed the season, with their winning percentage of .649 still being a team record. The Expos played in Montreal, Quebec, Canada as expansion team in 1969 through 2004, with the majority of that time (1977–2004) spent in Montreal's Olympic Stadium. Dissatisfaction with the stadium resulted in their relocation to Washington in 2005.

While the Nationals had a losing record in six of their first seven seasons, the team eventually came together in 2012 under the talent of players such as rookie Bryce Harper and pitcher Stephen Strasburg to win their first NL East title in 2012 and bring playoff baseball back to Washington for the first time since 1933. In the 2012 National League Division Series, the Nationals were one out away from winning Game 5 against the St. Louis Cardinals before they rallied to defeat and eliminate the Nationals. From 2012 to 2017, the Nationals would win the NL East four times but lost in the NLDS each time, with three of them going the full five games. In 2019, the Nationals had won just 19 of their first 50 games but managed to reach the postseason with a 93–69 record as the second Wild Card team in the NL. They defeated the Milwaukee Brewers in the Wild Card Game for their first win in a winner-take-all postseason game since moving to Washington. They upset the Los Angeles Dodgers in the NLDS that went the full five games before sweeping the St. Louis Cardinals in the NLCS. With the win in their 51st season as a franchise, it ended the longest drought for a team's first pennant in MLB history. In the 2019 World Series, led by Strasburg, Max Scherzer and Juan Soto, the Nationals rallied from a 3–2 series deficit by winning the last two games on the road, with Howie Kendrick hitting a go-ahead home run in the seventh inning of Game 7 to give Washington their first World Series championship, with Strasberg being named World Series MVP. Since the end of 2019, the Nationals have not reached the postseason, finishing fifth in the NL East in four of the last seven seasons from 2020 to 2026 and fourth in the other three.

The following takes into account both teams, as all Montreal records were carried with the franchise when it moved to Washington.

== Table Key ==
NLDS	National League Division Series
NLCS	National League Championship Series
MVP	Most Valuable Player Award
CYA	Cy Young Award
ROY	Rookie of the Year Award
MOY	Manager of the Year Award
CB POY	Comeback Player of the Year Award
WS MVP	World Series Most Valuable Player Award

== Season-by-season results ==
World Series champions †	National League champions *	Division champions ^	Wild card berth (1994–present) ¤

Season	Level	League	Division	Finish	Wins	Losses	Win%	GB	Postseason	Awards
Montreal Expos
1969	MLB	NL	East	6th	52	110	.321	48		
1970	MLB	NL	East	6th	73	89	.451	16		Carl Morton (ROY)
1971	MLB	NL	East	5th	71	90	.441	25½		
1972^{[a]}	MLB	NL	East	5th	70	86	.449	26½		
1973	MLB	NL	East	4th	79	83	.488	3½		
1974	MLB	NL	East	4th	79	82	.491	8½		
1975	MLB	NL	East	5th	75	87	.463	17½		
1976	MLB	NL	East	6th	55	107	.340	46		
1977	MLB	NL	East	5th	75	87	.463	26		Andre Dawson (ROY)
1978	MLB	NL	East	4th	76	86	.469	14		
1979	MLB	NL	East	2nd	95	65	.594	2		
1980	MLB	NL	East	2nd	90	72	.556	1		
1981^{[b]}	MLB	NL	East ^	3rd	30	25	.545	4	Won NLDS (Phillies) 3–2; Lost NLCS (Dodgers) 3–2	
1981^{[b]}	MLB	NL	East ^	1st	30	23	.566	—	Won NLDS (Phillies) 3–2; Lost NLCS (Dodgers) 3–2	
1982	MLB	NL	East	3rd	86	76	.531	6		
1983	MLB	NL	East	3rd	82	80	.506	8		
1984	MLB	NL	East	5th	78	83	.484	18		
1985	MLB	NL	East	3rd	84	77	.522	16½		Jeff Reardon (RMA)^{e}
1986	MLB	NL	East	4th	78	83	.484	29½		
1987	MLB	NL	East	3rd	91	71	.562	4		Buck Rodgers (MOY)
1988	MLB	NL	East	3rd	81	81	.500	20		
1989	MLB	NL	East	4th	81	81	.500	12		
1990	MLB	NL	East	3rd	85	77	.525	10		
1991	MLB	NL	East	6th	71	90	.441	26½		
1992	MLB	NL	East	2nd	87	75	.537	9		
1993	MLB	NL	East	2nd	94	68	.580	3		
1994	MLB	NL	East	1st^{[c]}	74	40	.649	—	Postseason cancelled	Felipe Alou (MOY)
1995	MLB	NL	East	5th	66	78	.458	24		
1996	MLB	NL	East	2nd	88	74	.543	8		
1997	MLB	NL	East	4th	78	84	.481	23		Pedro Martínez (CYA, PCA) ^{d}
1998	MLB	NL	East	4th	65	97	.401	41		
1999	MLB	NL	East	4th	68	94	.420	35		
2000	MLB	NL	East	4th	67	95	.414	28		
2001	MLB	NL	East	5th	68	94	.420	20		
2002	MLB	NL	East	2nd	83	79	.512	19		
2003	MLB	NL	East	4th	83	79	.512	18		
2004	MLB	NL	East	5th	67	95	.414	29		
Washington Nationals
2005	MLB	NL	East	5th	81	81	.500	9		Chad Cordero (RMA)^{e}
2006	MLB	NL	East	5th	71	91	.438	26		
2007	MLB	NL	East	4th	73	89	.451	16		Dmitri Young (CPOY)
2008	MLB	NL	East	5th	59	102	.366	32½		
2009	MLB	NL	East	5th	59	103	.364	34		
2010	MLB	NL	East	5th	69	93	.426	28		
2011	MLB	NL	East	3rd	80	81	.497	21½		
2012	MLB	NL	East ^	1st	98	64	.605	—	Lost NLDS (Cardinals) 3–2	Davey Johnson (MOY); Bryce Harper (ROY)
2013	MLB	NL	East	2nd	86	76	.531	10		
2014	MLB	NL	East ^	1st	96	66	.593	—	Lost NLDS (Giants) 3–1	Matt Williams (MOY)
2015	MLB	NL	East	2nd	83	79	.512	7		Bryce Harper (MVP)
2016	MLB	NL	East ^	1st	95	67	.586	—	Lost NLDS (Dodgers) 3–2	Max Scherzer (CYA)
2017	MLB	NL	East ^	1st	97	65	.599	—	Lost NLDS (Cubs) 3–2	Max Scherzer (CYA)
2018	MLB	NL	East	2nd	82	80	.506	8		
2019	MLB †	NL *	East	2nd ¤	93	69	.574	4	Won NLWC (Brewers); Won NLDS (Dodgers) 3–2; Won NLCS (Cardinals) 4–0; Won World Series (Astros) 4–3 †	Stephen Strasburg (WS MVP)
2020	MLB	NL	East	4th	26	34	.433	9		
2021	MLB	NL	East	5th	65	97	.401	23½		
2022	MLB	NL	East	5th	55	107	.340	46		
2023	MLB	NL	East	5th	71	91	.438	33		
2024	MLB	NL	East	4th	71	91	.438	24		
2025	MLB	NL	East	5th	66	96	.407	30		
2026	MLB	NL	East	4th	77	85	.475	17		

== All-time records ==
Totals	Wins	Losses	Win%	
Totals	2755	2943	.484	All-time Montreal Expos regular season record (1969–2004)
Totals	5	5	.500	All-time Montreal Expos postseason record (1969–2004)
Totals	2760	2948	.484	All-time combined Montreal Expos regular and postseason record (1969–2004)
Totals	1653	1807	.478	All-time Washington Nationals regular season record (2005–2026)
Totals	19	17	.528	All-time Washington Nationals postseason record (2005–2026)
Totals	1672	1824	.478	All-time combined Washington Nationals regular and postseason record (2005–2026)
Totals	4408	4750	.481	All-time combined franchise regular season record (1969–2026)
Totals	24	22	.522	All-time combined franchise postseason record (1969–2026)
Totals	4432	4772	.482	All-time combined franchise regular and postseason record (1969–2026)

== Record by decade ==
The following table describes the Expos′ (1969–2004) and Nationals′ (2005–2025) combined regular-season won–lost record by decade.

Decade	Wins	Losses	Win %
1960s	52	110	.321
1970s	748	862	.465
1980s	811	752	.519
1990s	776	777	.500
2000s	711	908	.439
2010s	879	740	.543
2020s	431	601	.418
All-time	4408	4750	.481

These statistics are from Baseball-Reference.com's Washington Nationals History & Encyclopedia, and are current as of September 27, 2026

== Postseason appearances ==
Year	Wild Card Game/Series	LDS		LCS		World Series	
1981	None (Won NL East)	Philadelphia Phillies	W (3–2)	Los Angeles Dodgers	L (2–3)		
2012	None (Won NL East)	St. Louis Cardinals	L (2–3)				
2014	None (Won NL East)	San Francisco Giants	L (1–3)				
2016	None (Won NL East)	Los Angeles Dodgers	L (2–3)				
2017	None (Won NL East)	Chicago Cubs	L (2–3)				
2019	Milwaukee Brewers W	Los Angeles Dodgers	W (3–2)	St. Louis Cardinals	W (4–0)	Houston Astros	W (4–3)

== Post-season record by year ==
The Nationals have made the postseason six times in their history, with their first being in 1981 (as the Expos) and the most recent being in 2019.

Year	Finish	Round	Opponent	Result		
1981	NL East Champions (second half)	NLDS	Philadelphia Phillies	Won	3	2
1981	NL East Champions (second half)	NLCS	Los Angeles Dodgers	Lost	2	3
2012	NL East Champions	NLDS	St. Louis Cardinals	Lost	2	3
2014	NL East Champions	NLDS	San Francisco Giants	Lost	1	3
2016	NL East Champions	NLDS	Los Angeles Dodgers	Lost	2	3
2017	NL East Champions	NLDS	Chicago Cubs	Lost	2	3
2019	World Series Champions	Wild Card Game	Milwaukee Brewers	Won	1	0
2019	World Series Champions	NLDS	Los Angeles Dodgers	Won	3	2
2019	World Series Champions	NLCS	St. Louis Cardinals	Won	4	0
2019	World Series Champions	World Series	Houston Astros	Won	4	3
6	Totals			5–5	24	22

== Footnotes ==
- ^{a} The 1972 Major League Baseball strike forced the cancellation of the first seven games (thirteen game-days) of the season.
- ^{b} The 1981 Major League Baseball strike caused the season to split into two halves. This caused Major League Baseball to hold the Divisional Series so that the first- and second-half champions could play each other to determine playoff spots for the NLCS and World Series. As such, the Expos finished one-half game ahead of the second-place St. Louis Cardinals in the second half of the 1981 season.
- ^{c} The 1994–95 Major League Baseball strike ended the season on August 11, as well as cancelling the entire postseason. While Montreal was leading by six games ahead of the second-place Atlanta Braves at the beginning of the strike, no team was officially awarded any division titles.
- ^{d} PCA-PI stands for Players' Choice Award for Outstanding Pitcher in the National League.
- ^{e} RMA stands for the National League Rolaids Relief Man Award.
