= 1990 Montreal Expos season =

1990 Montreal Expos
- League: National League
- Division: East
- Ballpark: Olympic Stadium
- City: Montreal
- Record: 85–77
- Divisional place: 3rd
- Owners: Charles Bronfman
- General managers: Dave Dombrowski
- Managers: Buck Rodgers
- Television: CFCF-TV (Dave Van Horne, Ken Singleton, Ron Reusch); CBFT (Claude Raymond, Raymond Lebrun); The Sports Network (Ken Singleton, Dave Van Horne); RDS Network (Denis Casavant, Rodger Brulotte)
- Radio: CJAD (English) (Dave Van Horne, Bobby Winkles, Jerry Trupiano, Elliott Price); CKAC (French) (Jacques Doucet, Rodger Brulotte)

The 1990 Montreal Expos season was the 22nd season in franchise history. An 85–77 record was good enough to put them in third place in the National League East and 10 games behind the Pittsburgh Pirates.

== Offseason ==
- October 26, 1989: Yamil Benitez was signed by the Montreal Expos as an amateur free agent.
- December 7, 1989: Oil Can Boyd signed as a free agent with the Montreal Expos.
- December 7, 1989: Keith Atherton was signed as a free agent with the Montreal Expos.
- January 24, 1990: John Candelaria was released by the Montreal Expos.
- March 17, 1990: Eric Bullock was signed as a free agent with the Montreal Expos.

== Spring training ==
The Expos held spring training at West Palm Beach Municipal Stadium in West Palm Beach, Florida – a facility they shared with the Atlanta Braves. It was their 14th season at the stadium; they had conducted spring training there from 1969 to 1972 and since 1981.

== Regular season ==
- On May 14, 1990, pitching for the in Los Angeles, Kevin Gross and Dodgers starter Fernando Valenzuela accomplished the rare feat of hitting homers off each other in the same inning.

=== Season standings ===
NL East
Team	W	L	Pct.	GB	Home	Road
Pittsburgh Pirates	95	67	.586	—	49‍–‍32	46‍–‍35
New York Mets	91	71	.562	4	52‍–‍29	39‍–‍42
Montreal Expos	85	77	.525	10	47‍–‍34	38‍–‍43
Chicago Cubs	77	85	.475	18	39‍–‍42	38‍–‍43
Philadelphia Phillies	77	85	.475	18	41‍–‍40	36‍–‍45
St. Louis Cardinals	70	92	.432	25	34‍–‍47	36‍–‍45

=== Record vs. opponents ===
1990 National League record Sources:
Team	ATL	CHC	CIN	HOU	LAD	MON	NYM	PHI	PIT	SD	SF	STL
Atlanta	—	6–6	8–10	5–13	6–12	6–6	4–8	5–7	5–7	8–10	5–13	7–5
Chicago	6–6	—	4–8	6–6	3–9	11–7	9–9	11–7	4–14	8–4	7–5	8–10
Cincinnati	10–8	8–4	—	11–7	9–9	9–3	6–6	7–5	6–6	9–9	7–11	9–3
Houston	13–5	6–6	7–11	—	9–9	5–7	5–7	5–7	5–7	4–14	10–8	6–6
Los Angeles	12–6	9–3	9–9	9–9	—	6–6	5–7	8–4	4–8	9–9	8–10	7–5
Montreal	6–6	7–11	3–9	7–5	6–6	—	8–10	10–8	13–5	7–5	7–5	11–7
New York	8–4	9–9	6–6	7–5	7–5	10–8	—	10–8	10–8	5–7	7–5	12–6
Philadelphia	7-5	7–11	5–7	7–5	4–8	8–10	8–10	—	6–12	7–5	8–4	10–8
Pittsburgh	7–5	14–4	6–6	7–5	8–4	5–13	8–10	12–6	—	10–2	8–4	10–8
San Diego	10–8	4–8	9–9	14–4	9–9	5–7	7–5	5–7	2–10	—	7–11	3–9
San Francisco	13–5	5–7	11–7	8–10	10–8	5–7	5–7	4–8	4–8	11–7	—	9–3
St. Louis	5–7	10–8	3–9	6–6	5–7	7–11	6–12	8–10	8–10	9–3	3–9	—

=== Opening Day starters ===
- Delino DeShields
- Andrés Galarraga
- Marquis Grissom
- Kevin Gross
- Spike Owen
- Tim Raines
- Nelson Santovenia
- Larry Walker
- Tim Wallach

=== Notable transactions ===
- April 23, 1990: Rex Hudler was traded by the Montreal Expos to the St. Louis Cardinals for John Costello.
- June 4, 1990: Shane Andrews, Rondell White, Gabe White, Stan Spencer, Ben Van Ryn and Stan Robertson were drafted by the Expos in the 1st round of the 1990 amateur draft.
- June 18, 1990: Rolando Roomes was selected off waivers by the Montreal Expos from the Cincinnati Reds.
- July 2, 1990: Ugueth Urbina was signed by the Montreal Expos as an amateur free agent.
- August 8, 1990: Zane Smith was traded by the Montreal Expos to the Pittsburgh Pirates for a player to be named later, Scott Ruskin, and Willie Greene. The Pittsburgh Pirates sent Moisés Alou (August 16, 1990) to the Montreal Expos to complete the trade.

=== Roster ===
1990 Montreal Expos
Roster
Pitchers: 52 Scott Anderson; 47 Brian Barnes; 23 Oil Can Boyd; 44 Tim Burke; 50 John Costello; 49 Howard Farmer; 41 Steve Frey; 40 Mark Gardner; 26 Brett Gideon; 46 Kevin Gross; 45 Drew Hall; 38 Joe Hesketh; 42 Bob Malloy; 32 Dennis Martínez; 54 Dale Mohorcic; 43 Chris Nabholz; 51 Mel Rojas; 34,56 Scott Ruskin; 55 Bill Sampen; 24,28 Dave Schmidt; 34 Zane Smith; 48 Rich Thompson	Catchers: 20 Mike Fitzgerald; 19 Jerry Goff; 15 Orlando Mercado; 22 Nelson Santovenia; Infielders: 4 Delino DeShields; 16 Tom Foley; 14 Andrés Galarraga; 6 Wallace Johnson; 3 Junior Noboa; 11 Spike Owen; 5 Johnny Paredes; 29 Tim Wallach	Outfielders: 24,25 Mike Aldrete; 18 Moisés Alou; 9 Marquis Grissom; 1 Dave Martinez; 35 Otis Nixon; 30 Tim Raines; 27 Rolando Roomes; 33 Larry Walker; Other batters: 38 Eric Bullock; 25 Rex Hudler	Manager: 37 Buck Rodgers; Coaches: 36 Larry Bearnarth (Pitching); 21 Tommy Harper (First base); 17 Rafael Landestoy (Bench); 31 Ken Macha (Bullpen); 12 Hal McRae (Hitting); 19 Tom Runnells (Third base)

== Player stats ==
=== Batting ===
==== Starters by position ====
Note: Pos = Position; G = Games played; AB = At bats; H = Hits; Avg. = Batting average; HR = Home runs; RBI = Runs batted in

Pos	Player	G	AB	H	Avg.	HR	RBI
C	Mike Fitzgerald	111	313	76	.243	9	41
1B	Andrés Galarraga	155	579	148	.256	20	87
2B	Delino DeShields	129	499	144	.289	4	45
SS	Spike Owen	149	453	106	.234	5	35
3B	Tim Wallach	161	626	185	.296	21	98
LF	Tim Raines	130	457	131	.287	9	62
CF	Dave Martinez	118	391	109	.279	11	39
RF	Larry Walker	133	419	101	.241	19	51

==== Other batters ====
Note: G = Games played; AB = At bats; H = Hits; Avg. = Batting average; HR = Home runs; RBI = Runs batted in

Player	G	AB	H	Avg.	HR	RBI
Marquis Grissom	98	288	74	.257	3	29
Otis Nixon	119	231	58	.251	1	20
Tom Foley	73	164	35	.213	0	12
Nelson Santovenia	59	163	31	.190	6	28
Mike Aldrete	96	161	39	.242	1	18
Junior Noboa	81	158	42	.266	0	14
Jerry Goff	52	119	27	.227	3	7
Wallace Johnson	47	49	8	.163	1	5
Moisés Alou	14	15	3	.200	0	0
Rolando Roomes	16	14	4	.286	0	1
Orlando Mercado	8	8	2	.250	0	0
Johnny Paredes	3	6	2	.333	0	1
Rex Hudler	4	3	1	.333	0	0
Eric Bullock	4	2	1	.500	0	0

=== Pitching ===
==== Starting pitchers ====
Note: G = Games pitched; IP = Innings pitched; W = Wins; L = Losses; ERA = Earned run average; SO = Strikeouts

Player	G	IP	W	L	ERA	SO
Dennis Martínez	32	226.0	10	11	2.95	156
Oil Can Boyd	31	190.2	10	6	2.93	113
Kevin Gross	31	163.1	9	12	4.57	111
Mark Gardner	27	152.2	7	9	3.42	135
Zane Smith	22	139.1	6	7	3.23	80
Chris Nabholz	11	70.0	6	2	2.83	53
Brian Barnes	4	28.0	1	1	2.89	23

==== Other pitchers ====
Note: G = Games pitched; IP = Innings pitched; W = Wins; L = Losses; ERA = Earned run average; SO = Strikeouts

Player	G	IP	W	L	ERA	SO
Howard Farmer	6	23.0	0	3	7.04	14
Scott Anderson	4	18.0	0	1	3.00	16

==== Relief pitchers ====
Note: G = Games pitched; W = Wins; L = Losses; SV = Saves; ERA = Earned run average; SO = Strikeouts

Player	G	W	L	SV	ERA	SO
Tim Burke	58	3	3	20	2.52	47
Bill Sampen	59	12	7	2	2.99	69
Steve Frey	51	8	2	9	2.10	29
Drew Hall	42	4	7	3	5.09	40
Dale Mohorcic	34	1	2	2	3.23	29
Dave Schmidt	34	3	3	13	4.31	22
Mel Rojas	23	3	1	1	3.60	26
Scott Ruskin	23	1	0	0	2.28	23
John Costello	4	0	0	0	5.68	1
Joe Hesketh	2	1	0	0	0.00	3
Bob Malloy	1	0	0	0	0.00	1
Rich Thompson	1	0	0	0	0.00	0
Brett Gideon	1	0	0	0	9.00	0
Junior Noboa	1	0	0	0	0.00	0
Dave Martinez	1	0	0	0	54.00	0

== Awards and honors ==
1990 Major League Baseball All-Star Game

- Dennis Martinez, Pitcher, Reserve
- Tim Wallach, Third Base, Reserve

== Farm system ==
Level	Team	League	Manager
AAA	Indianapolis Indians	American Association	Tim Johnson
AA	Jacksonville Expos	Southern League	Jerry Manuel
A	West Palm Beach Expos	Florida State League	Felipe Alou
A	Rockford Expos	Midwest League	Mike Quade
A-Short Season	Jamestown Expos	New York–Penn League	Pat Daugherty
Rookie	GCL Expos	Gulf Coast League	Lorenzo Bundy
