= 1981 National League Championship Series =

13th edition of Major League Baseball's National League Championship Series

Team (Wins)	Managers	Season
Los Angeles Dodgers (3)	Tommy Lasorda	36–21, .632, GA: ½ (1st half); 27–26, .509, GB: 6 (2nd half)
Montreal Expos (2)	Jim Fanning	30–25, .545, GB: 4 (1st half); 30–23, .566, GA: ½ (2nd half)
- Dates: October 13–19
- MVP: Burt Hooton (Los Angeles)
- Umpires: Paul Pryor; Eric Gregg; Paul Runge; Dutch Rennert; Harry Wendelstedt (crew chief); Joe West

Broadcast
- Television: NBC; KTTV (LAD); CBC (MON – English); SRC (MON – French)
- TV announcers: NBC: Dick Enberg and Tom Seaver; KTTV: Vin Scully, Jerry Doggett and Ross Porter; CBC: Dave Van Horne and Duke Snider; SRC: Jean-Pierre Roy and Guy Ferron
- Radio: CBS; KABC (LAD); CFCF (MON – English); CKAC (MON – French)
- Radio announcers: CBS: Jack Buck and Jerry Coleman; KABC: Vin Scully, Jerry Doggett and Ross Porter; CFCF: Dave Van Horne, Duke Snider and Ron Reusch; CKAC: Claude Raymond and Jacques Doucet
- NLDS: Los Angeles Dodgers over Houston Astros (3–2); Montreal Expos over Philadelphia Phillies (3–2)

The 1981 National League Championship Series was a best-of-five playoff series in Major League Baseball’s 1981 postseason to end the 1981 National League season. It was the 13th NLCS in all. The series featured the first-half West Division champion Los Angeles Dodgers and the second-half East Division champion Montreal Expos. The Dodgers won the series three games to two over the Expos, thanks to a tie-breaking, game-winning ninth-inning home run in Game 5 by Rick Monday in what has ever since been referred to as "Blue Monday" by Expos fans.

The Dodgers would go on to defeat the New York Yankees in the World Series.

== Background ==
Due to the 1981 Major League Baseball strike, a team had to win two postseason series in order to go to the World Series. Teams that finished first in their division in the first and second halves of the season advanced to the postseason. This was the first year the baseball postseason had three rounds, an arrangement that would permanently return beginning with the 1995 season. The Expos advanced to the NLCS after defeating the defending World Series champion Philadelphia Phillies in the NL Division Series three games to two, and the Dodgers made their way to the NLCS after beating the Houston Astros three games to two in the NLDS.

This was also the first NLCS since 1973 that did not feature either the Philadelphia Phillies or their cross-state rival Pittsburgh Pirates, and only the third since the NLCS was first played in 1969.

== Summary ==
=== Montreal Expos vs. Los Angeles Dodgers ===
Los Angeles won the series, 3–2.

Game	Date	Score	Location	Time	Attendance
1	October 13	Montreal Expos – 1, Los Angeles Dodgers – 5	Dodger Stadium	2:47	51,273
2	October 14	Montreal Expos – 3, Los Angeles Dodgers – 0	Dodger Stadium	2:48	53,463
3	October 16	Los Angeles Dodgers – 1, Montreal Expos – 4	Olympic Stadium	2:27	54,372
4	October 17	Los Angeles Dodgers – 7, Montreal Expos – 1	Olympic Stadium	3:14	54,499
5	October 19	Los Angeles Dodgers – 2, Montreal Expos – 1	Olympic Stadium	2:41	36,491

== Game summaries ==
=== Game 1 ===
October 13, 1981 1:05 pm (PT) at Dodger Stadium in Los Angeles, California 64 °F (18 °C), mostly cloudy
Team	1	2	3	4	5	6	7	8	9	R	H	E
Montreal	0	0	0	0	0	0	0	0	1	1	9	0
Los Angeles	0	2	0	0	0	0	0	3	X	5	8	0
WP: Burt Hooton (1–0) LP: Bill Gullickson (0–1); Home runs: MTL: None; LAD: Pedro Guerrero (1), Mike Scioscia (1)

The Dodgers took the first game of the series behind the strong pitching of starter Burt Hooton. For the first seven innings the game stayed close, with the only scoring coming in the second inning when the Dodgers got two runs on an RBI double by Ron Cey and a squeeze bunt by Bill Russell. Hooton and reliever Bob Welch made the 2–0 lead stand up until the eighth when the Dodgers broke the game open with three more runs on back-to-back homers by Pedro Guerrero and Mike Scioscia. The Expos got one run back in the ninth when Larry Parrish doubled home Gary Carter. But reliever Steve Howe came on for the Dodgers and got the final three outs to preserve Los Angeles' victory.

=== Game 2 ===
October 14, 1981 5:20 pm (PT) at Dodger Stadium in Los Angeles, California 63 °F (17 °C), clear
Team	1	2	3	4	5	6	7	8	9	R	H	E
Montreal	0	2	0	0	0	1	0	0	0	3	10	1
Los Angeles	0	0	0	0	0	0	0	0	0	0	5	1
WP: Ray Burris (1–0) LP: Fernando Valenzuela (0–1)

Montreal's Ray Burris helped even the series with a masterful complete game shutout in Game 2. The Dodgers managed only five singles against Burris, and their only real threats, in the sixth and ninth, were foiled by double plays. Typically in what would be a very low-scoring series, the Expos didn't do much more hitting against Dodger starter Fernando Valenzuela. But Montreal did manage to push across two runs in the second on RBI hits by Warren Cromartie and Tim Raines. Montreal added another run in the sixth, aided by Dusty Baker's error in left. Burris did the rest to notch his 3–0 victory.

=== Game 3 ===
October 16, 1981 8:20 pm (ET) at Olympic Stadium in Montreal, Quebec 44 °F (7 °C), partly cloudy
Team	1	2	3	4	5	6	7	8	9	R	H	E
Los Angeles	0	0	0	1	0	0	0	0	0	1	7	0
Montreal	0	0	0	0	0	4	0	0	X	4	7	1
WP: Steve Rogers (1–0) LP: Jerry Reuss (0–1); Home runs: LAD: None; MTL: Jerry White (1)

Montreal got another superb pitching performance in Game 3, this time from Steve Rogers, to take a 2–1 lead in the series. Rogers allowed only a single run on a Ron Cey groundout after singles by Dusty Baker and Steve Garvey in the fourth. For a while it looked like Dodger starter Jerry Reuss might make that 1–0 score hold up. But Montreal finally rallied for four runs in the sixth on a run-scoring single by Larry Parrish and a three-run homer by Jerry White. Rogers easily preserved the 4–1 lead over the final three innings, and Montreal was now only one victory away from the World Series.

=== Game 4 ===
October 17, 1981 1:05 pm (ET) at Olympic Stadium in Montreal, Quebec 48 °F (9 °C), partly cloudy
Team	1	2	3	4	5	6	7	8	9	R	H	E
Los Angeles	0	0	1	0	0	0	0	2	4	7	12	1
Montreal	0	0	0	1	0	0	0	0	0	1	5	1
WP: Burt Hooton (2–0) LP: Bill Gullickson (0–2); Home runs: LAD: Steve Garvey (1); MTL: None

For the first seven innings Game 4 followed the usual pattern of the series, with dominant performances from both starting pitchers. Montreal's Bill Gullickson allowed an unearned run in the third, after Bill Russell reached on Larry Parrish's error and scored on Dusty Baker's double. Los Angeles' Burt Hooton gave up the game-tying run in the fourth on another unearned tally, when Gary Carter reached on Ron Cey's error and scored on a single by Warren Cromartie. The starters yielded nothing more until the eighth, when Steve Garvey's two-run homer put the Dodgers up 3–1 and chased Gullickson. The Dodgers blew the game open with four more runs in the ninth, highlighted by Baker's two-run single. Hooton finally tired in the eighth but the Dodger bullpen got the last five outs and the series was even.

=== Game 5 ===
October 19, 1981 1:05 pm (ET) at Olympic Stadium in Montreal, Quebec 41 °F (5 °C), drizzle
Team	1	2	3	4	5	6	7	8	9	R	H	E
Los Angeles	0	0	0	0	1	0	0	0	1	2	6	0
Montreal	1	0	0	0	0	0	0	0	0	1	3	1
WP: Fernando Valenzuela (1–1) LP: Steve Rogers (1–1) Sv: Bob Welch (1); Home runs: LAD: Rick Monday (1); MTL: None

After a rainout (actually a snow/cold out) on Sunday, October 18, Olympic Stadium was only two-thirds full for Game 5 on a cold and drizzly Monday afternoon, which turned out to be the series' most dramatic contest. As usual in the series, the starting pitchers dominated, with the Dodgers' Fernando Valenzuela and the Expos' Ray Burris. Montreal broke on top with a single run in the first when Tim Raines led off with a double and eventually scored on a double play. The Dodgers tied the game in the fifth after Rick Monday singled, went to third on a Pedro Guerrero single, and scored on a groundout. Burris finally left the game in the eighth when the Expos pinch-hit for him. Montreal brought on their ace Steve Rogers to pitch the ninth, and with two out in the inning, he gave up a homer to Monday on a 3–1 count to put the Dodgers up 2–1. The Expos got a couple of two-out walks in the bottom of the ninth off Valenzuela, but Bob Welch came on to get the final out and send the Dodgers to the World Series. It would be the final postseason game played in Montreal and it would take another 31 seasons until the franchise returned to the postseason again as the Washington Nationals.

The date came to be known as "Blue Monday" by Expos' fans. Expos' broadcaster Dave Van Horne described the loss as one of the lowest points in team history.

== Composite box ==
1981 NLCS (3–2): Los Angeles Dodgers over Montreal Expos

Team	1	2	3	4	5	6	7	8	9	R	H	E
Los Angeles Dodgers	0	2	1	1	1	0	0	5	5	15	38	2
Montreal Expos	1	2	0	1	0	5	0	0	1	10	34	4
Total attendance: 250,098 Average attendance: 50,020

== Aftermath ==
The Montreal Expos moved to Washington D.C. in 2005 and became the Nationals

The Dodgers went on to defeat the New York Yankees four games to two in the 1981 World Series, their only championship in the Garvey-Lopes-Russell-Cey era. From 1973 to 1981, the historic infield combined for 21 All-Star selections, with each man receiving at least three.

According to “The Colorful Montreal Expos” episode of MLB Network Presents, Monday himself was left unaware of “Blue Monday” until he tried eating at a restaurant in Montreal with Steve Yeager during the Dodgers’ first road series in 1982 against the Expos and were asked by the manager to leave since six of the patrons were wanting to instigate a fight with him, with Monday commenting that “The winters are long in Montreal and they don't forget anything” in response.

This was the only postseason appearance for the Montreal Expos before the franchise moved to Washington, D.C., and became the Washington Nationals. The 1981 NLCS was covered briefly in the Netflix series, Who Killed the Montreal Expos?.
