= 1983 Montreal Expos season =

1983 Montreal Expos
- League: National League
- Division: East
- Ballpark: Olympic Stadium
- City: Montreal
- Record: 82–80 (.506)
- Divisional place: 3rd
- Owners: Charles Bronfman
- General managers: John McHale
- Managers: Bill Virdon
- Television: CBC Television (Dave Van Horne, Duke Snider); Télévision de Radio-Canada (Jean-Pierre Roy, Raymond Lebrun)
- Radio: CFCF (English) (Dave Van Horne, Duke Snider, Tommy Hutton, Ron Reusch); CKAC (French) (Claude Raymond, Jacques Doucet)

The 1983 Montreal Expos season was the 15th season in franchise history. They finished 82–80, 8 games back of the Philadelphia Phillies in the National League East. At the end of the season, the Expos had managed the best cumulative winning percentage in the National League from 1979 to 1983.

== Offseason ==
- November 3, 1982: Bobby Ramos was purchased by the Expos from the New York Yankees.
- December 23, 1982: Woodie Fryman was signed as a free agent with the Expos.
- February 7, 1983: Jerry Manuel was traded by the Expos to the Chicago Cubs for Butch Benton.
- March 31, 1983: Ken Phelps was purchased from the Expos by the Seattle Mariners.

== Spring training ==
The Expos held spring training at West Palm Beach Municipal Stadium in West Palm Beach, Florida – a facility they shared with the Atlanta Braves. It was their seventh season at the stadium; they had conducted spring training there from 1969 to 1972 and since 1981.

== Regular season ==
- April 17, 1983: Andre Dawson became Nolan Ryan's 3500th strikeout.
- April 27, 1983: Nolan Ryan of the Astros struck out Brad Mills to break Walter Johnson's all time mark for strikeouts in a career. Mills was the 3,509th strikeout of Ryan's career.

=== Season standings ===
NL East
Team	W	L	Pct.	GB	Home	Road
Philadelphia Phillies	90	72	.556	—	50‍–‍31	40‍–‍41
Pittsburgh Pirates	84	78	.519	6	41‍–‍40	43‍–‍38
Montreal Expos	82	80	.506	8	46‍–‍35	36‍–‍45
St. Louis Cardinals	79	83	.488	11	44‍–‍37	35‍–‍46
Chicago Cubs	71	91	.438	19	43‍–‍38	28‍–‍53
New York Mets	68	94	.420	22	41‍–‍41	27‍–‍53

=== Record vs. opponents ===
1983 National League record Sources:
Team	ATL	CHC	CIN	HOU	LAD	MON	NYM	PHI	PIT	SD	SF	STL
Atlanta	—	5–7	12–6	11–7	7–11	7–5	8–4	7–5	6–6	9–9	9–9	7–5
Chicago	7–5	—	4–8	5–7	6–6	7–11	9–9	5–13	9–9	5–7	4–8	10–8
Cincinnati	6–12	8–4	—	5–13	7–11	4–8	7–5	6–6	6–6	9–9	10–8	6–6
Houston	7–11	7–5	13–5	—	6–12	8–4	9–3	4–8	6–6	11–7	12–6	2–10
Los Angeles	11–7	6–6	11–7	12–6	—	7–5	7–5	11–1	6–6	6–12–1	5–13	9–3
Montreal	5–7	11–7	8–4	4–8	5–7	—	8–10	8–10–1	8–10	8–4	8–4	9–9
New York	4–8	9–9	5–7	3–9	5–7	10–8	—	6–12	9–9	6–6	5–7	6–12
Philadelphia	5-7	13–5	6–6	8–4	1–11	10–8–1	12–6	—	11–7	5–7	5–7	14–4
Pittsburgh	6–6	9–9	6–6	6–6	6–6	10–8	9–9	7–11	—	9–3	6–6	10–8
San Diego	9–9	7–5	9–9	7–11	12–6–1	4–8	6–6	7–5	3–9	—	11–7	6–6
San Francisco	9–9	8–4	8–10	6–12	13–5	4–8	7–5	7–5	6–6	7–11	—	4–8
St. Louis	5–7	8–10	6–6	10–2	3–9	9–9	12–6	4–14	8–10	6–6	8–4	—

=== Notable transactions ===
- May 4, 1983: Chris Welsh was purchased by the Expos from the San Diego Padres.
- June 6, 1983: Cliff Young was drafted by the Expos in the 5th round of the 1983 Major League Baseball draft.
- June 18, 1983: Sergio Valdez was signed as an amateur free agent by the Expos.
- August 17, 1983: Don Carter (minors) and $300,000 were traded by the Expos to the Cleveland Indians for Manny Trillo.
- September 27, 1983: Greg Harris was selected off waivers by the Expos from the Cincinnati Reds.

=== Roster ===
1983 Montreal Expos
Roster
Pitchers: 39 Greg Bargar; 48 Ray Burris; 37 Tom Dixon; 35 Woodie Fryman; 50 Rick Grapenthin; 34 Bill Gullickson; 42 Bob James; 53 Charlie Lea; 47 Randy Lerch; 41 Jeff Reardon; 45 Steve Rogers; 21 Scott Sanderson; 43 Dan Schatzeder; 38 Bryn Smith; 26 Chris Welsh	Catchers: 17 Tim Blackwell; 8 Gary Carter; 44 Bobby Ramos; 11 Tom Wieghaus; Infielders: 15 Terry Crowley; 23 Doug Flynn; 3 Bryan Little; 24 Brad Mills; 0 Al Oliver; 12 Mike Phillips; 6 Ángel Salazar; 4 Chris Speier; 17 Manny Trillo; 29 Tim Wallach	Outfielders: 49 Warren Cromartie; 10 Andre Dawson; 16 Terry Francona; 30 Tim Raines; 47 Gene Roof; 31 Razor Shines; 32 Mike Stenhouse; 33 Mike Vail; 18 Jerry White; 5 Jim Wohlford; Other batters: 25 Mike Fuentes; 1 Wallace Johnson	Manager: 7 Bill Virdon; Coaches: 36 Galen Cisco (Pitching); 2 Billy DeMars (Hitting/Third Base); 40 Joe Kerrigan (Bullpen); 9 Vern Rapp (First Base); 22 Mel Wright (Unknown-Died on May 16, 1983)

== Player stats ==
= Indicates team leader

= Indicates league leader

=== Batting ===
==== Starters by position ====
Note: Pos = Position; G = Games played; AB = At bats; H = Hits; Avg. = Batting average; HR = Home runs; RBI = Runs batted in; SB = Stolen bases

Pos	Player	G	AB	H	2B	3B	Avg.	HR	RBI	SB
C	Gary Carter	145	541	146	37	3	.270	17	79	1
1B	Al Oliver	157	614	184	38	3	.300	8	84	1
2B	Doug Flynn	143	452	107	18	4	.237	0	26	2
SS	Chris Speier	88	261	67	12	2	.257	2	22	2
3B	Tim Wallach	156	581	156	33	3	.269	19	70	0
LF	Tim Raines	156	618	183	32	8	.298	11	71	90
CF	Andre Dawson	159	633	189	36	10	.299	32	113	25
RF	Warren Cromartie	120	360	100	26	2	.278	3	43	8

==== Other batters ====
Note: G = Games played; AB = At bats; H = Hits; Avg. = Batting average; HR = Home runs; RBI = Runs batted in

Player	G	AB	H	Avg.	HR	RBI
Bryan Little	106	350	91	.260	1	36
Terry Francona	120	230	59	.257	3	22
Jim Wohlford	83	141	39	.277	1	14
Manny Trillo	31	121	32	.264	2	16
Bobby Ramos	27	61	14	.230	0	5
Mike Vail	34	53	15	.283	2	4
Terry Crowley	50	44	8	.182	0	3
Mike Stenhouse	24	40	5	.125	0	2
Ángel Salazar	36	37	8	.216	0	1
Jerry White	40	34	5	.147	0	0
Brad Mills	14	20	5	.250	0	1
Tim Blackwell	6	15	3	.200	0	2
Gene Roof	8	12	2	.167	0	1
Mike Fuentes	6	4	1	.250	0	0
Wallace Johnson	3	2	1	.500	0	0
Razor Shines	3	2	1	.500	0	0
Mike Phillips	5	2	0	.000	0	0
Tom Wieghaus	1	0	0	----	0	0

=== Pitching ===
==== Starting pitchers ====
Note: G = Games pitched; IP = Innings pitched; W = Wins; L = Losses; ERA = Earned run average; SO = Strikeouts

Player	G	IP	W	L	ERA	SO
Steve Rogers	36	273.0	17	12	3.23	146
Bill Gullickson	34	242.1	17	12	3.75	120
Charlie Lea	33	222.0	16	11	3.12	137
Scott Sanderson	18	81.1	6	7	4.65	55

==== Other pitchers ====
Note: G = Games pitched; IP = Innings pitched; W = Wins; L = Losses; ERA = Earned run average; SO = Strikeouts

Player	G	IP	W	L	ERA	SO
Bryn Smith	49	155.1	6	11	2.49	101
Ray Burris	40	154.0	4	7	3.68	100
Chris Welsh	16	44.2	0	1	5.04	17
Randy Lerch	19	38.2	1	3	6.75	24
Greg Bargar	8	20.0	2	0	6.75	9

==== Relief pitchers ====
Note: G = Games pitched; W = Wins; L = Losses; SV = Saves; ERA = Earned run average; SO = Strikeouts

Player	G	W	L	SV	ERA	SO
Jeff Reardon	66	7	9	21	3.03	78
Dan Schatzeder	58	5	2	2	3.21	48
Bob James	27	1	0	7	2.88	56
Woodie Fryman	6	0	3	0	21.00	1
Tom Dixon	4	0	1	0	9.82	4
Rick Grapenthin	1	0	1	0	9.00	3

== Awards and honours ==
- Andre Dawson, National League Gold Glove
- Tim Raines, National League Stolen Base Leader, 90

1983 Major League Baseball All-Star Game

== Farm system ==
Level	Team	League	Manager
AAA	Wichita Aeros	American Association	Felipe Alou
AA	Memphis Chicks	Southern League	Rick Renick
A	West Palm Beach Expos	Florida State League	Tommy Thompson
A	Gastonia Expos	South Atlantic League	J. R. Miner
A-Short Season	Jamestown Expos	New York–Penn League	Moby Benedict
Rookie	Calgary Expos	Pioneer League	Ed Creech

LEAGUE CHAMPIONS: Gastonia
