= 1985 Montreal Expos season =

1985 Montreal Expos
- League: National League
- Division: East
- Ballpark: Olympic Stadium
- City: Montreal
- Record: 84–77
- Divisional place: 3rd
- Owners: Charles Bronfman
- General managers: Murray Cook
- Managers: Buck Rodgers
- Television: CBC Television (Dave Van Horne, Duke Snider, Ken Singleton); Télévision de Radio-Canada (Claude Raymond, Raymond Lebrun)
- Radio: CFCF (English) (Dave Van Horne, Duke Snider, Tommy Hutton, Ron Reusch); CKAC (French) (Jacques Doucet, Rodger Brulotte)

The 1985 Montreal Expos season was the 17th season in franchise history. They finished with a record of 84–77, third in the National League East and 16 1/2 games behind the St. Louis Cardinals.

== Offseason ==
- November 7, 1984: Chris Welsh was traded by the Expos to the Texas Rangers for Dave Hostetler.
- November 14, 1984: Larry Walker was signed by the Expos as an amateur free agent.
- December 4, 1984: Jack Daugherty was purchased by the Expos from the Helena Gold Sox.
- December 7, 1984: Bob James was traded by the Expos to the Chicago White Sox for Vance Law.
- December 7, 1984: Bryan Little was traded by the Expos to the Chicago White Sox for Bert Roberge.
- December 10, 1984 Gary Carter was traded by the Expos to the New York Mets for Hubie Brooks, Mike Fitzgerald, Herm Winningham and Floyd Youmans.
- January 9, 1985: Mike Stenhouse was traded by the Expos to the Minnesota Twins for Jack O'Connor.
- March 28, 1985: Bobby Ramos was released by the Expos.

== Spring training ==
The Expos held spring training at West Palm Beach Municipal Stadium in West Palm Beach, Florida – a facility they shared with the Atlanta Braves. It was their ninth season at the stadium; they had conducted spring training there from 1969 to 1972 and since 1981.

== Regular season ==
April 30, 1985: In an 11–0 loss to the Philadelphia Phillies, position player Razor Shines pitched one inning as the Expos pitching resources were depleted.

=== Season standings ===
NL East
Team	W	L	Pct.	GB	Home	Road
St. Louis Cardinals	101	61	.623	—	54‍–‍27	47‍–‍34
New York Mets	98	64	.605	3	51‍–‍30	47‍–‍34
Montreal Expos	84	77	.522	16½	44‍–‍37	40‍–‍40
Chicago Cubs	77	84	.478	23½	41‍–‍39	36‍–‍45
Philadelphia Phillies	75	87	.463	26	41‍–‍40	34‍–‍47
Pittsburgh Pirates	57	104	.354	43½	35‍–‍45	22‍–‍59

=== Record vs. opponents ===
1985 National League record Sources:
Team	ATL	CHC	CIN	HOU	LAD	MON	NYM	PHI	PIT	SD	SF	STL
Atlanta	—	5–7	7–11	8–10	5–13	3–9	2–10	10–2	6–6	7–11	10–8	3–9
Chicago	7–5	—	5–6	5–7	5–7	7–11	4–14	13–5	13–5	8–4	6–6	4–14
Cincinnati	11–7	6–5	—	11–7	7–11	8–4	4–8	7–5	9–3	9–9	12–6	5–7
Houston	10–8	7–5	7–11	—	6–12	6–6	4–8	4–8	6–6	12–6	15–3	6–6
Los Angeles	13–5	7–5	11–7	12–6	—	7–5	7–5	4–8	8–4	8–10	11–7	7–5
Montreal	9–3	11–7	4–8	6–6	5–7	—	9–9	8–10	9–8	5–7	7–5	11–7
New York	10–2	14–4	8–4	8–4	5–7	9–9	—	11–7	10–8	7–5	8–4	8–10
Philadelphia	2-10	5–13	5–7	8–4	8–4	10–8	7–11	—	11–7	5–7	6–6	8–10
Pittsburgh	6–6	5–13	3–9	6–6	4–8	8–9	8–10	7–11	—	4–8	3–9	3–15
San Diego	11–7	4–8	9–9	6–12	10–8	7–5	5–7	7–5	8–4	—	12–6	4–8
San Francisco	8–10	6–6	6–12	3–15	7–11	5–7	4–8	6–6	9–3	6–12	—	2–10
St. Louis	9–3	14–4	7–5	6–6	5–7	7–11	10–8	10–8	15–3	8–4	10–2	—

=== Notable transactions ===
- May 12, 1985: Dave Hostetler was purchased from the Expos by the Chicago Cubs.
- June 3, 1985: Randy Johnson was drafted by the Expos in the 2nd round of the 1985 Major League Baseball draft. Johnson signed June 9, 1985.
- June 22, 1985: The Expos traded a player to be named later to the Toronto Blue Jays for Mitch Webster. The Expos completed the deal by sending Cliff Young to the Blue Jays on September 10.
- August 12, 1985: Doug Frobel was purchased by the Montreal Expos from the Pittsburgh Pirates.

=== Major League debuts ===
- Batters:
  - Andrés Galarraga (Aug 23)
  - Al Newman (June 14)
- Pitchers:
  - Tim Burke (Apr 8)
  - John Dopson (Sep 4)
  - Floyd Youmans (Jul 1)

=== Roster ===
1985 Montreal Expos
Roster
Pitchers: 44 Tim Burke; 54 John Dopson; 49 Ed Glynn; 47 Rick Grapenthin; 34 Bill Gullickson; 38 Joe Hesketh; 19 Bill Laskey; 25 Gary Lucas; 24,48 Mickey Mahler; 32 Jack O'Connor; 46 David Palmer; 41 Jeff Reardon; 42 Bert Roberge; 45 Steve Rogers; 43 Dan Schatzeder; 28 Bryn Smith; 51 Randy St. Claire; 17 Floyd Youmans	Catchers: 11 Sal Butera; 20 Mike Fitzgerald; 6 Steve Nicosia; 18 Mike O'Berry; 14 Ned Yost; Infielders: 17 Skeeter Barnes; 7 Hubie Brooks; 22 Dan Driessen; 23 Doug Flynn; 16 Terry Francona; 12 Andrés Galarraga; 2 Vance Law; 6 Fred Manrique; 4 Al Newman; 31 Razor Shines; 24 Scot Thompson; 29 Tim Wallach; 1 U L Washington	Outfielders: 10 Andre Dawson; 18 Miguel Diloné; 22 Doug Frobel; 27 Roy Johnson; 30 Tim Raines; 23 Mitch Webster; 3 Herm Winningham; 5 Jim Wohlford	Manager: 37 Buck Rodgers; Coaches: 36 Larry Bearnarth (Pitching); 26 Ron Hansen (First Base); 40 Joe Kerrigan (Bullpen); 9 Russ Nixon (Third Base); 35 Rick Renick (Hitting)

== Player stats ==
=== Batting ===
==== Starters by position ====
Note: Pos = Position; G = Games played; AB = At bats; H = Hits; Avg. = Batting average; HR = Home runs; RBI = Runs batted in

Pos	Player	G	AB	H	Avg.	HR	RBI
C	Mike Fitzgerald	108	295	61	.207	5	34
1B	Dan Driessen	91	312	78	.250	6	25
2B	Vance Law	147	519	138	.266	10	52
SS	Hubie Brooks	156	605	163	.269	13	100
3B	Tim Wallach	155	569	148	.260	22	81
LF	Tim Raines	150	575	184	.320	11	41
CF	Herm Winningham	125	312	74	.237	3	21
RF	Andre Dawson	139	529	135	.255	23	91

==== Other batters ====
Note; G = Games played; AB = At bats; H = Hits; Avg. = Batting average; HR = Home runs; RBI = Runs batted in

Player	G	AB	H	Avg.	HR	RBI
Terry Francona	107	281	75	.267	2	31
Mitch Webster	74	212	58	.274	11	30
U L Washington	68	193	48	.249	1	17
Jim Wohlford	70	125	24	.192	1	15
Sal Butera	67	120	24	.200	3	12
Miguel Dilone	51	84	16	.190	0	6
Andrés Galarraga	24	75	14	.187	2	4
Steve Nicosia	42	71	12	.169	0	1
Razor Shines	47	50	6	.120	0	3
Scot Thompson	34	32	9	.281	0	4
Al Newman	25	29	5	.172	0	1
Skeeter Barnes	19	26	4	.154	0	0
Doug Frobel	12	23	3	.130	1	4
Mike O'Berry	20	21	4	.190	0	0
Fred Manrique	9	13	4	.308	1	1
Ned Yost	5	11	2	.182	0	0
Doug Flynn	9	6	1	.167	0	0
Roy Johnson	3	5	0	.000	0	0

=== Pitching ===
= Indicates league leader

==== Starting pitchers ====
Note: G = Games pitched; IP = Innings pitched; W = Wins; L = Losses; ERA = Earned run average; SO = Strikeouts

Player	G	IP	W	L	ERA	SO
Bryn Smith	32	222.1	18	5	2.91	127
Bill Gullickson	29	181.1	14	12	3.52	68
Joe Hesketh	25	155.1	10	5	2.49	113
David Palmer	24	135.2	7	10	3.71	106
Floyd Youmans	14	77.0	4	3	2.45	54
Mickey Mahler	9	48.1	1	4	3.54	32
Steve Rogers	8	38.0	2	4	5.68	18

==== Other pitchers ====
Note: G = Games pitched; IP = Innings pitched; W = Wins; L = Losses; ERA = Earned run average; SO = Strikeouts

Player	G	IP	W	L	ERA	SO
Dan Schatzeder	24	104.1	3	5	3.80	64
Bill Laskey	11	34.1	0	5	9.44	18
John Dopson	4	13.0	0	2	11.08	4

==== Relief pitchers ====
Note: G = Games pitched; W = Wins; L = Losses; SV = Saves; ERA = Earned run average; SO = Strikeouts

Player	G	W	L	SV	ERA	SO
Jeff Reardon	63	2	8	41	3.18	67
Tim Burke	78	9	4	8	2.39	87
Gary Lucas	49	6	2	1	3.19	31
Randy St.Claire	42	5	3	0	3.93	25
Bert Roberge	42	3	3	2	3.44	34
Jack O'Connor	20	0	2	0	4.94	16
Rick Grapenthin	5	0	0	0	14.14	4
Ed Glynn	3	0	0	0	19.29	2
Razor Shines	1	0	0	0	0.00	0
Sal Butera	1	0	0	0	0.00	0

== Award winners ==
- Andre Dawson, National League Gold Glove

1985 Major League Baseball All-Star Game

== Farm system ==
Level	Team	League	Manager
AAA	Indianapolis Indians	American Association	Felipe Alou
AA	Jacksonville Expos	Southern League	Tommy Thompson
A	West Palm Beach Expos	Florida State League	J. R. Miner
A-Short Season	Jamestown Expos	New York–Penn League	Ed Creech
