= Major League Baseball on TSN =

Canadian television series

The MLB on TSN is a television presentation of Major League Baseball games on Canada's TSN (The Sports Network). TSN has broadcast Major League Baseball games since they went on the air in 1984. Their current MLB schedule consists of simulcasting NBC's Sunday Night Baseball broadcasts on TSN2. TSN had previously broadcast Sunday Night Baseball from 1990 to 2000. TSN has also broadcast Toronto Blue Jays (1984-2009) and Montreal Expos (1985-1999; 2001) games.

== Toronto Blue Jays ==
Toronto Blue Jays baseball aired on TSN from September 1, 1984 until September 23, 2009. When The Sports Network launched in 1984, the second live sporting event to air (following a Canada Cup hockey game) was a Minnesota Twins - Toronto Blue Jays game. In 1985, TSN became the majority broadcaster of Toronto Blue Jays games, a position which they would hold until the 2002 season. From 1992-2000, Baseball Tonight, a pregame show hosted by former Blue Jay Pat Tabler preceded the game, with TSN Sportsdesk following it. The last game aired on September 23, 2009, as Rogers Sportsnet acquired the complete rights for the 2010 season.

Blue Jays broadcasts were sponsored by Labatt from 1984-2000 and by Rogers from 2001-2009. Labatt also sponsored TSN's Expos broadcasts for a number of years.

== Commentators ==
=== Toronto Blue Jays ===
- Fergie Olver (play-by-play, 1984–1989)
- Jim Hughson (play-by-play, 1990–1994)
- Dan Shulman (play-by-play, 1995–2001)
- Rod Black (play-by-play, 2002–2009)
- Ken Singleton (analyst, 1984–1986)
- Tony Kubek (analyst, 1985–1986)
- Buck Martinez (analyst, 1987–2000)
- Paul Romanuk (studio host, 1992–1996, 1998)
- Vic Rauter (studio host, 1996–1997)
- Mike Toth (studio host, 1997)
- Rod Smith (studio host, 1998)
- Dave Hodge (studio host, 1999–2000)
- Pat Tabler (studio analyst, 1993–2000) (analyst, 2001–2009)

=== Montreal Expos ===
- Tommy Hutton (play-by-play, 1985–1986)
- Jim Hughson (play-by-play, 1987–1989)
- Dave Van Horne (play-by-play, 1990–1999)
- Vic Rauter (studio host, 1996–1997, play-by-play, 2001)
- Ken Singleton (analyst, 1986–1996)
- Mike Stenhouse (analyst, 1996)
- Gary Carter (analyst, 1997–1999)
- Warren Sawkiw (analyst, 2001)
- Paul Romanuk (studio host, 1992–1996, 1998)
- Mike Toth (studio host, 1997)
- Rod Smith (studio host, 1998)
- Dave Hodge (studio host, 1999)
