= Joe Cannon (radio) =

Joe Cannon is a Canadian radio personality who worked in Montreal from 1975 to 2008, with the exception of a three-year period (1989 to 1993), where he was employed in Toronto.

== Biography ==
A native of Quebec City, Cannon was the great-grandson of Lieutenant Governor of Quebec and Chief Justice of Canada Charles Fitzpatrick. He began his career at 16 with CJQC. He then worked in Cornwall, Ontario, Hamilton, Ontario, and Niagara Falls, Ontario. In 1975, he moved to Montreal to become the host of CJAD's morning show. He was quickly replaced by George Balcan and filled the 10 am to noon slot until he was replaced by Neil McKenty's Exchange in 1978. Cannon then hosted the morning show on CFCF until 1981, when he was replaced by Ted Blackman and moved to the noon to 5 pm slot. He returned to CJAD in 1982 and replaced McKenty as host of Exchange in 1985.

In 1989, Cannon moved to Toronto to host the drive time show on CFRB. In 1990, he moved to CJCL, where he hosted the morning show until the station adopted a sports radio format in 1992.

After working as a fill-in host at CFRB, Cannon returned to Montreal in 1993 as the morning host on CIQC. In 1996, he left the program to join the Montreal Expos radio broadcast team. His hiring was criticized by Expos fans because he had never worked as a baseball announcer and was a friend of the team president, Claude Brochu. His commentary was described by The Gazette sportswriter Doug Camilli as "dimwitted and [displaying] little knowledge of the game's tradition". The Expos were unable to secure an English-language radio contract for the 2000 season, so the team instead provided a broadcast on their website. Cannon worked alongside Dave Van Horne for home games, but was not included on road games until late in the season, when Van Horne was away for the birth of his child. Cannon's contract was not renewed after the season. After leaving the Expos, Cannon hosted at CINW until the station changed formats in 2008.
