= Russ Taylor (baseball broadcaster) =

Russell Taylor (August 19, 1926 – August 19, 1977) was a Canadian Major League Baseball play-by-play broadcaster who worked alongside lead announcer Dave Van Horne on the Montreal Expos’ English-language radio network for the first eight years of the expansion team’s existence, 1969 through 1976. Taylor also was a notable sportscaster for Montreal’s CFCF radio and CFCF-TV television outlets. His daughter is actress and comedian Carolyn Taylor.

Taylor began his radio career with CFCF in 1948 as a control-room engineer. During the 1950s, he called play-by-play action—including studio recreations of road games—for the Montreal Royals of the International League, one of the Triple-A affiliates of the Brooklyn/Los Angeles Dodgers. When the Royals left Montreal after the 1960 season, the city and Taylor were bereft of professional baseball for eight years.

== Montreal Expos ==
Then, in 1968, Montreal unexpectedly was awarded one of two new National League expansion teams—and the Expos became Canada's first MLB franchise. Taylor, by then a sportscaster for CFCF, was instrumental in identifying Jarry Park to city and team officials and league president Warren Giles as a potential location for a temporary ballpark to house the club while a new stadium was constructed. Montreal’s lack of a suitable interim facility endangered the city’s franchise award, but the last-minute selection of the municipal site, and the decision to expand a small sports field to a 30,000-seat temporary venue, staved off the crisis.

The Expos' first major-league game took place on April 8, 1969, at Shea Stadium against the New York Mets. As O Canada was being sung during the pre-game ceremonies, Pennsylvania native Van Horne “looked over at his broadcast partner, born-and-bred Montrealer Russ Taylor, and saw tears streaming down his cheeks. ‘I thought, “Wow!"' remembered Van Horne. '"This is much bigger to every Canadian, not just Montrealers and Quebecers, than I had anticipated".'”

Taylor’s eight-season tenure as a member of the club’s radio team coincided with its tenancy at Jarry Park before the Expos moved into Montreal’s Olympic Stadium in 1977. That season, Taylor also moved—from the radio booth to the Expo front office as director of communications. However, he was not able to serve a full year in his new post, succumbing to a heart attack on his 51st birthday on August 19.

Said fellow Montreal sportscaster Dick Irvin Jr. in a tribute that was aired on the day of Taylor’s death: “Russ loved Jarry Park, he loved the broadcasts, and he loved baseball—he loved the life, he loved the travels, he loved sitting around talking baseball [and] playing trivia, and he loved the Expos.”

Irvin also recalled that a youthful Taylor had recommended a future Hockey Hall of Fame broadcaster, Danny Gallivan, to the Montreal Canadiens and Hockey Night in Canada, when they were searching for a play-by-play announcer. While Taylor was working as a radio technician at the Montreal Forum in the late 1940s, he had been impressed when he heard Gallivan—who hailed from Nova Scotia and was then little known outside his native province—describe an amateur hockey match.
