= Jean-Paul Sarault =

Canadian sportswriter and baseball announcer (1930–2010)

Jean-Paul Sarault (1930–2010) was a Canadian sportswriter who was the first French-language radio play-by-play announcer for the Montreal Expos of Major League Baseball.

Sarault began his writing career in 1947 at La Patrie. After a four-year stint with The Canadian Press, Sarault joined Montréal-Matin. He then served as the sports editor of Dernière Heure until 1968, when he returned to Montréal-Matin to cover the city's new Major League Baseball team, the Montreal Expos. In 1969, he was chosen to become the Expos' first French-language radio play-by-play announcer. He was replaced by Jacques Doucet in 1972, but continued to write for Montréal-Matin until the paper folded in 1978. He then wrote for Le Soleil and RDS.ca. In 1979, he was elected president of the Baseball Writers' Association of America.

Sarault died in Montreal on October 10, 2010, from cancer.
