= Da Rond Stovall =

American baseball player (born 1973)

- Outfielder
- Born: January 3, 1973 (age 52); St. Louis, Missouri, U.S.
- Batted: Both Threw: Left

MLB debut
- April 1, 1998, for the Montreal Expos

Last MLB appearance
- July 22, 1998, for the Montreal Expos

MLB statistics
- Batting average: .205
- Home runs: 2
- Runs batted in: 6
- Stats at Baseball Reference

Teams
- Montreal Expos (1998)

Da Rond Tyrone Stovall (born January 3, 1973) is an American former professional baseball player. Stovall played for the Montreal Expos of Major League Baseball (MLB) in 1998. He currently coaches high school baseball in Webster Groves, Missouri.
