= Buck Rodgers =

American baseball player and manager (born 1938)

- Rodgers in early 1960s card
- Catcher / Manager
- Born: August 16, 1938 (age 88); Delaware, Ohio, U.S.
- Batted: Switch Threw: Right

MLB debut
- September 8, 1961, for the Los Angeles Angels

Last MLB appearance
- September 28, 1969, for the California Angels

MLB statistics
- Batting average: .232
- Home runs: 31
- Runs batted in: 288
- Managerial record: 784–774
- Winning %: .503
- Stats at Baseball Reference
- Managerial record at Baseball Reference

Teams
- As player: Los Angeles / California Angels (1961–1969); As manager: Milwaukee Brewers (1980–1982); Montreal Expos (1985–1991); California Angels (1991–1994); As coach: Minnesota Twins (1970–1974); San Francisco Giants (1975); Milwaukee Brewers (1978–1980)

Career highlights and awards
- NL Manager of the Year (1987)

Robert Leroy "Buck" Rodgers (born August 16, 1938) is an American former professional baseball player, coach, and manager. He played in Major League Baseball (MLB) as a catcher for the Los Angeles / California Angels for nine seasons during the 1960s. He later managed three major-league teams: the Milwaukee Brewers, Montreal Expos, and California Angels, compiling a managerial record of 784–774 (.503).

== Playing career ==
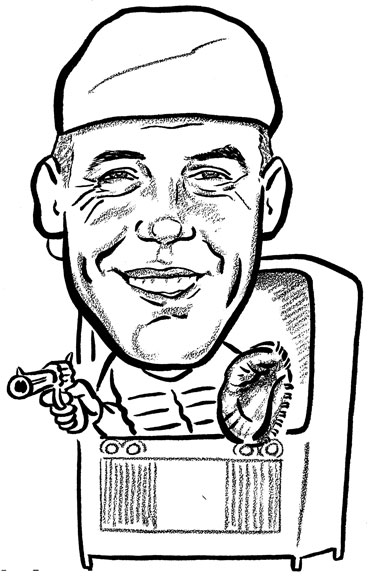
1962 caricature of Rodgers

Born in Delaware, Ohio, Rodgers graduated from Prospect High School in 1956 and was a star basketball player as well scoring over 1,700 points in his career and averaging 25 points per game over his Junior and Senior seasons with a high of 55 in 1956. He attended Ohio Wesleyan University and Ohio Northern University. He signed his first professional contract with the Detroit Tigers in 1956, spent five years in their farm system, and was selected by the Angels in the 1960 MLB Expansion Draft.

He was a top defensive catcher and a switch-hitter who played nine major league seasons (1961–1969), all with the Angels, compiling a .232 batting average with 704 hits, 114 doubles, 18 triples and 31 home runs in 932 games played. As a player, Rodgers caught Bo Belinsky's no-hitter on May 5, 1962.

== Managerial career ==
1982 headshot of Rodgers as manager of Milwaukee Brewers

In between his playing and managing careers, Rodgers served as a coach for the Minnesota Twins (1970–1974), San Francisco Giants (1976), and the Brewers (1978–1980). He managed in the Angels' farm system in 1975 and 1977. His managerial career was book-ended by unusual circumstances.

=== Milwaukee Brewers ===
He first became manager of the Brewers (then a contending team in the American League East Division) on an acting basis at the outset of the 1980 season. He was serving as the club's third-base coach when manager George Bamberger suffered a heart attack. Rodgers posted a record of 26–21 as acting field boss until Bamberger was able to return June 4. However, with the Brewers treading water under Bamberger with a record of 47–45, the manager stepped down on September 9, 1980, and Rodgers resumed the helm, the team winning 13 of its last 23 games to ultimately finish third.

The 1981 campaign was disrupted for six weeks by an in-season players' strike, which caused the major leagues to adopt a split-season format. Rodgers led the Brewers to the best overall record in the AL East at 62–47 and the second half title, but Milwaukee lost the divisional playoff to the New York Yankees, three games to two. It would be Rodgers' only postseason appearance as a manager. In 1982, the Brewers started slowly under Rodgers and he was fired June 1 with the team's record at 23–24. The Brewers then finished the season around under his successor, batting coach Harvey Kuenn, with 95 wins and went on to win their only American League pennant as "Harvey's Wallbangers".

=== Montreal Expos ===
After guiding the Indianapolis Indians of the AAA American Association to the 1984 regular season championship, Rodgers was promoted to manager of the parent Expos, replacing Jim Fanning. His first six years (1985–1990) in Montreal were largely successful, with the Expos averaging almost 84 wins per season, but when the team faltered in 1991, winning only 20 of its first 49 games, Rodgers was replaced as manager by Tom Runnells on June 2.

=== California Angels ===
On August 26, 1991, the Angels fired Doug Rader and hired Rodgers as their new manager. In his return to Anaheim, Rodgers led the Angels to a 20–18 record for the remainder of the campaign. He was 39 games into his first full season in 1992 when the team bus was involved in an expressway accident in New Jersey on May 20. Rodgers was seriously injured in the crash and missed 90 games. After his recovery, he resumed the helm on August 28, but his club lost 20 of 34 games to close the season. Then the 1993 Angels finished 20 games below .500 (71–91). When the team started the 1994 season at 16–23, Rodgers was fired on May 16 and replaced by Marcel Lachemann.

== Managerial record ==
| Team | Year | Regular season | | | | | Postseason | | | |
| Team | Year | Games | Won | Lost | Win % | Finish | Won | Lost | Win % | Result |
|---|---|---|---|---|---|---|---|---|---|---|
| MIL | 1980 | 47 | 26 | 21 | .553 | 3rd in AL East | – | – | – | – |
| MIL | 1980 | 23 | 13 | 10 | .565 | 3rd in AL East | – | – | – | – |
| MIL | 1981 | 56 | 31 | 25 | .554 | 3rd in AL East | 2 | 3 | .400 | Lost ALDS (NYY) |
| MIL | 1981 | 53 | 31 | 22 | .585 | 1st in AL East | 2 | 3 | .400 | Lost ALDS (NYY) |
| MIL | 1982 | 47 | 23 | 24 | .489 | (fired) | – | – | – | – |
| MIL total | | 226 | 124 | 102 | .549 | | 2 | 3 | .400 | – |
| MTL | 1985 | 161 | 84 | 77 | .522 | 3rd in NL East | – | – | – | – |
| MTL | 1986 | 161 | 78 | 83 | .484 | 4th in NL East | – | – | – | – |
| MTL | 1987 | 162 | 91 | 71 | .562 | 3rd in NL East | – | – | – | – |
| MTL | 1988 | 162 | 81 | 81 | .500 | 3rd in NL East | – | – | – | – |
| MTL | 1989 | 162 | 81 | 81 | .500 | 4th in NL East | – | – | – | – |
| MTL | 1990 | 162 | 85 | 77 | .525 | 3rd in NL East | – | – | – | – |
| MTL | 1991 | 49 | 20 | 29 | .408 | (fired) | – | – | – | – |
| MTL total | | 1,020 | 520 | 499 | .510 | | – | – | – | – |
| CAL | 1991 | 38 | 20 | 18 | .526 | 7th in AL West | – | – | – | – |
| CAL | 1992 | 39 | 19 | 20 | .487 | 5th in AL West | – | — | – | – |
| CAL | 1992 | 34 | 14 | 20 | .412 | 5th in AL West | – | — | – | – |
| CAL | 1993 | 162 | 71 | 91 | .438 | 5th in AL West | – | – | – | – |
| CAL | 1994 | 40 | 16 | 24 | .400 | (fired) | – | – | – | – |
| CAL total | | 313 | 140 | 173 | .447 | | – | – | – | – |
| Total | | 1,559 | 784 | 774 | .503 | | 2 | 3 | .400 | |

| Preceded by Charlie Silvera | Minnesota Twins bullpen coach 1970–1973 | Succeeded by Jerry Zimmerman (1976) |
| Preceded by Al Worthington | Minnesota Twins pitching coach 1974 | Succeeded by Lee Stange |
| Preceded by Don McMahon | San Francisco Giants pitching coach 1976 | Succeeded by Herm Starrette |
| Preceded by Jimmy Bragan | Milwaukee Brewers third base coach 1978–1980 | Succeeded by Harry Warner |
