= Marc Griffin (baseball) =

Canadian baseball player and broadcaster

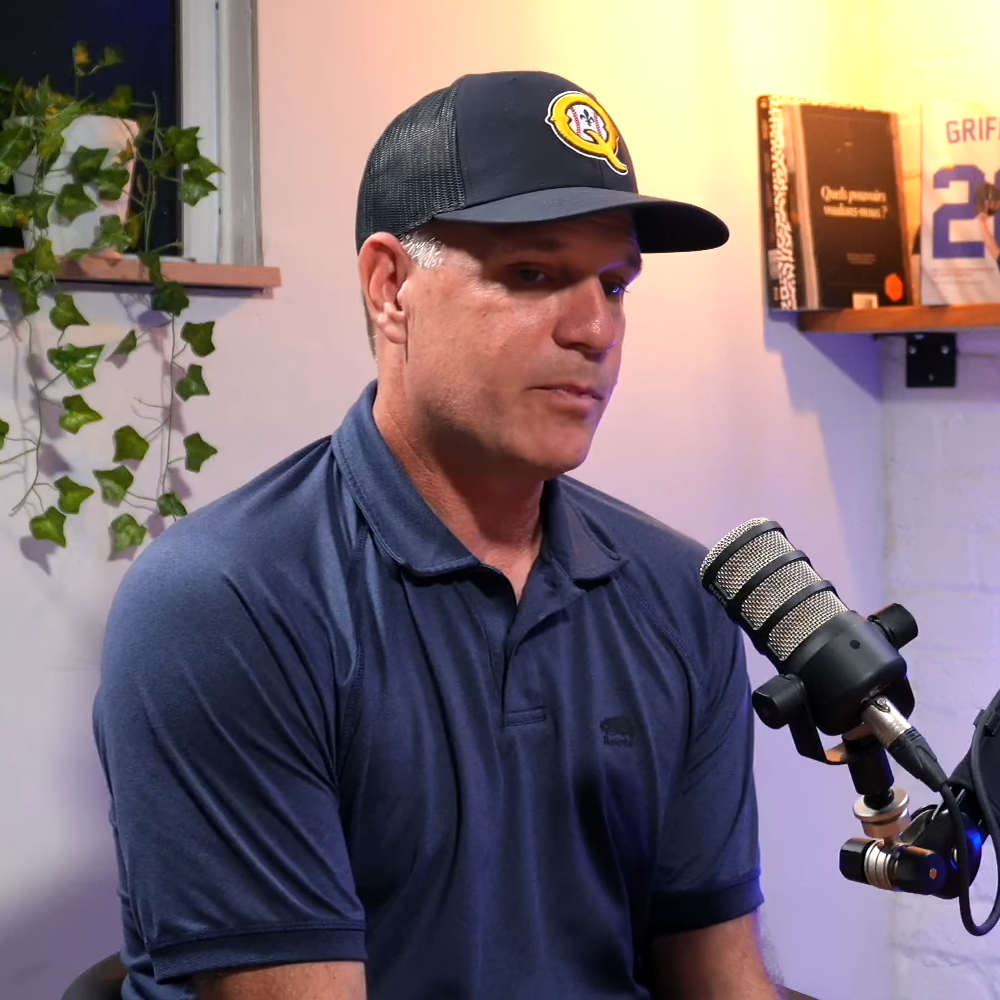
- Griffin in 2025
- Outfielder
- Born: September 15, 1968 (age 58); Quebec City, Quebec, Canada
- Bats: Left Throws: Right
- Stats at Baseball Reference

Career highlights and awards
- 1991 Florida State League All-Star Game Most Valuable Player

Marc Denis Griffin (born September 15, 1968) is a Canadian baseball broadcaster and former player who is an analyst for Réseau des sports (RDS).

== Playing ==
Griffin was born in Quebec City and attended École secondaire Les Compagnons-de-Cartier and the National Baseball Institute. He was a member of the Canada national baseball team that played in the 1988 Summer Olympics. In 1988, he signed with the Los Angeles Dodgers for a reported bonus of $70,000. During his time in the Dodgers' organization, the team used the English spelling of Mark rather than the French spelling of Marc.

In 1989, Griffin batted .282 with 2 home runs, 52 RBI, and 35 stolen bases in 129 games for the Vero Beach Dodgers. He was a member of the National League team in that year's Florida State League All-Star Game. He split the following season between Vero Beach and Bakersfield. In 137 games between the two clubs, he had 3 home runs, 38 RBI, 49 stolen bases, and a .258 batting average. In 1991, he batted .240 with 33 RBI and 42 stolen bases in 115 games for Vero Beach. He was named most valuable player of the 1991 FSL All-Star Game after a 4 hit, 3 RBI, 2 stolen base performance that included a steal of home.

On December 9, 1991, the Dodgers traded Griffin to the Montreal Expos for Ben Van Ryn. In June 1992, Dr. Frank Jobe performed surgery on Griffin's right elbow and was unable to play in any games that season. He returned the following season and played 69 games with Class A-Advanced West Palm Beach Expos, where he batted .319 with 23 stolen bases. In 24 games for the Expos Double-A affiliate, Harrisburg Senators, Griffin's batting average dropped to .151. After going 6 for 26 in 10 games for the Senators in 1994, Griffin was demoted to Class A. Griffin refused the demotion and after he was unable to find a team that would sign him at the Double-A level, retired. He came out of retirement the following spring and joined the Expos as a replacement player during the 1994–95 Major League Baseball strike. However, the dispute was settled before regular season games were played.

== Broadcasting ==
Griffin was released after the strike was resolved, but was hired by the Expos as coordinator of promotions. He also served as a colour commentator for Expos games on TQS. In 1996, he also filled-in on English-language broadcasts after the departure of Ken Singleton. In 1999, Griffin became the Expos director of broadcast services. From 2001 to 2004, he was the colour commentor on the Expos' French radio network alongside veteran announcer Jacques Doucet. In 2011, he joined RDS as a baseball analyst.
