= Raymond Lebrun =

Canadian sportscaster (1932–2017)

Raymond Lebrun (1932–2017) was a Canadian sportscaster for Radio-Canada.

Lebrun was born in Montreal in 1932. He studied contemporary French literature at McGill University. He began his career at private stations in Victoriaville and Trois-Rivières. In 1955, he CBOFT-TV in Ottawa, where he was a news reporter and host. He began working a fill-in radio and television sports announcer on Radio-Canada in 1959 and became a full time member of the staff in 1962. He was a part of the first team to cover an Olympic Games live (1964 Summer Olympics) and was the announcer for Nadia Comăneci's performance at the 1976 Summer Olympics. During the 1980s he was the sports anchor on CBF Bonjour. He also covered the National Football League for many years. In 1982, became Radio-Canada's announcer for Montreal Expos games, replacing Guy Ferron who died during the offseason.

Lebrun died on September 30, 2017, in Laval, Quebec.
