= Howard Farmer =

American baseball player (born 1966)

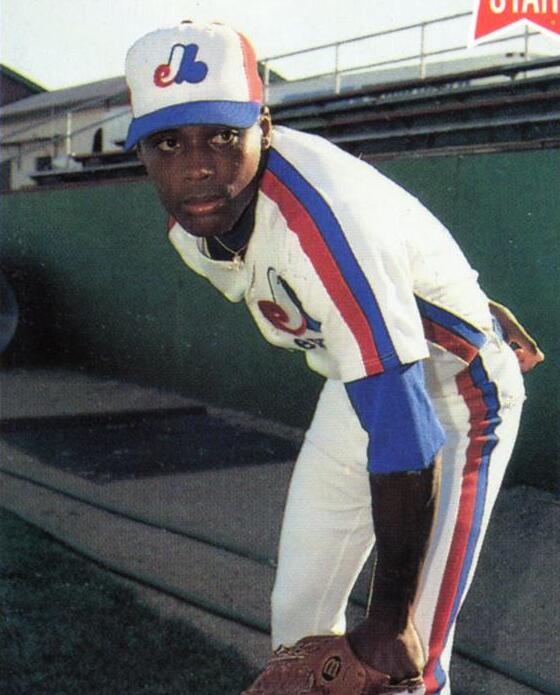
- Farmer with the Rockford Expos c. 1988
- Pitcher
- Born: November 18, 1966 (age 59); Gary, Indiana, U.S.
- Batted: Right Threw: Right

MLB debut
- July 2, 1990, for the Montreal Expos

Last MLB appearance
- October 1, 1990, for the Montreal Expos

MLB statistics
- Win–loss record: 0–3
- Earned run average: 7.04
- Strikeouts: 14
- Stats at Baseball Reference

Teams
- Montreal Expos (1990)

Howard Earl Farmer (born November 18, 1966) is an American former Major League Baseball pitcher. He played for the Montreal Expos in 1990.
