= Elliott Price =

Canadian sportscaster

Elliott Price is a Canadian sportscaster. He was most recently the host of the morning show of CJCL 590 in Toronto from early 2017 until January, 2019.

A graduate of John Abbott College, Price started his radio career in 1982 at CJAD in Montreal. At CJAD, he did play-by-play for the Montreal Alouettes in 1986 and was the Montreal Expos pre- and post-game host from 1989 to 1990. When the Expos left CJAD, Price moved to CFCF where he was Sports Director and a fill-in play-by-play announcer for games Dave Van Horne called on television. Price remained in this role until 2000 when the Expos were unable to get an English radio contract. In 2001, the Expos returned to radio and Price was hired to call play-by-play. Price remained with the Expos until the team moved to Washington, D. C. as the Nationals after the 2004 season. The Nationals seriously considered retaining Price as radio play-by-play announcer due to his knowledge of the team's history. However, when it was not clear that Price would be able to get an American work visa by opening day, the Nationals opted to go with the team of Charlie Slowes and Dave Shea instead.

Price stayed in Montreal, hosting CKGM's morning show with Shaun Starr until November 19, 2015, when he was laid off as part of cuts across Bell Media properties. Price began to produce and host his own sports talk show, Price is Right, beginning February 14, 2016 on multicultural station CFMB. On June 13, 2016, the program expanded to weeknights. In July 2016, Price announced a partnership with Sportsnet to distribute the program; it was renamed Sportsnet Tonight with Elliott Price, began to be available via the Sportsnet website, and Price became available as a Montreal-based contributor for the two Sportsnet Radio stations in Calgary and Toronto. Price retains his production duties and editorial control over the program.

On February 3, 2017, Price hosted the final episode of Sportsnet Tonight. The following week, it was announced that he would host a new morning show on CJCL in Toronto, Sportsnet's Starting Lineup, beginning on February 27, 2017. He left that job in late January, 2019.
