= Guy Ferron =

Canadian broadcaster

Guy Ferron was a Canadian broadcaster who was the play-by-play announcer for Montreal Expos games on Radio-Canada from 1969 to 1981.

A native of Saint-Prosper-de-Champlain, Ferron began his broadcasting career at CHLN in Trois-Rivières. He studied acting in Paris for three years and spent eight years as a theatre, television, and radio actor. He joined Société Radio-Canada as a fill-in host when its regular personalities were busy covering the 1964 Summer Olympics. He hosted Atom et galaxies, Elles, and Tous pour un on television, C'était heir and Invitation on FM radio, and Paysage et musique and Entretiens-chansons on AM radio. He also covered a number of sporting events, including the World Series, Grey Cup, Commonwealth Games, Quebec Games, and Olympic Games. Ferron was Société Radio-Canada's television announcer for the Montreal Expos from their inaugural 1969 season until his death on December 18, 1981.
