= CKLM =

Former radio station in Laval, Quebec

- Laval, Quebec; Canada
- Broadcast area: Greater Montreal
- Frequency: 1570 kHz
- Branding: CKLM 1570

Programming
- Format: MOR

Ownership
- Owner: CKLM Radio Laval-Montréal Inc.

History
- First air date: 1962
- Last air date: July 20, 1994
- Call sign meaning: Laval-Montréal

Technical information
- Class: B
- ERP: 50,000 watts

CKLM was a French-language Canadian radio station located in Laval, Quebec (near Montreal). It operated from 1962 to 1994.

The station broadcast on 1570 kHz with a power of 50,000 watts full-time as a class B station, using a directional antenna with different patterns day and night (the nighttime pattern being significantly tighter). While the station's signal was not particularly impressive from a strictly local point of view, the station was received by many DXers in Europe and was considered there as one of the "easy" targets for Transatlantic DX.

CKLM originally began with a variety format and identified itself as "the only unilingual French station in the world", referring to the fact that it only played French-language music (unlike most other French-language stations which played a significant amount of English-language music). It quickly became identified as a strongly nationalist station.

Late in 1967, the station feared that it would lose its licence, after it had broadcast special programming describing the July 1967 visit of French president Charles De Gaulle in Quebec, in which he made his extremely controversial "Vive le Québec libre!" statement. Because of these fears (radio broadcasting is a federal jurisdiction in Canada), the station changed its format to Top 40 (including English-language hits).

CKLM moved from Montreal to Laval in 1976 over the objections of CFGL-FM, which was already operating in that city. That station actually bought CKLM a few years later, but sold it in 1983 to new investors. The station then suffered from heavy financial difficulties, as listeners deserted the station in droves.

In April 1994, the company which held CKLM's licence (CKLM Radio Laval-Montréal Inc., controlled by Gérard Brunet), went bankrupt and all assets were transferred to a guaranteed creditor (2754363 Canada Inc.). That company rented the station to Réseau RadioCom Inc., a company operated by René Bourdelais which was already operating the station since January 1, 1994. All of this posed a problem as such changes legally have to be approved by the Canadian Radio-television and Telecommunications Commission (CRTC), and no approval was sought by any of these companies.

On July 15, 1994, the CRTC determined that there were too many irregularities going on, and it ordered CKLM to go off the air by July 17. CKLM initially ignored that order, but early on July 20, 1994, the station's transmitter was apparently hit by lightning and CKLM went off the air. The CRTC was willing to authorize CKLM to go back on the air if a proper application would have been made; there is however no record of any such application ever being made, and in any case the station never returned to the air.

Radio stations CJER, CJSA and CKSJ also left the air in 1994.

The 1570 kHz frequency was reactivated on March 9, 2004, when CFAV (now CJLV) went on the air.
