= Ted Blackman =

Ted Blackman (February 17, 1942 – October 2, 2002) was a Canadian media personality in the Montreal, Quebec area.

Blackman's career started as a disc jockey at high school and teen club dances in the 1950s. After high school, he sold his records and equipment to one of his friends, Donald Tarlton (a.k.a. Donald K Donald), who later became Montreal's premier promoter and rock and roll impresario.

Blackman began his career in journalism in Toronto, Ontario with United Press International in 1961, covering three Toronto Maple Leafs championships as well as several Grey Cups. In the mid-1960s he moved back home as a sports reporter for the Montreal Gazette, where he covered a variety of events prior to becoming the chief writer for the expansion Montreal Expos baseball club. During this time he was widely credited with creating nicknames such as "Le Grande Orange" for outfielder Rusty Staub and the bleachers at Jarry Park Stadium as "Jonesville" in honour of long ball hitter Mack Jones.

In 1971 Blackman began his dual role in the Montreal media working for CJAD 800 AM radio. He worked in various roles in Montreal radio over the next thirty years in sports and programming, primarily at CJAD. He also had stints as a morning man at rival CFCF from 1979 to 1981, and The Team at its Montreal Team 990 (an all sports station). He also penned a daily news column for the Montreal Gazette.

In October 1984, the Montreal Gazette suspended Blackman from his columnist position for having taken a job with radio station CJAD. The case was brought to labour arbitration.

Blackman died in hospital on October 2, 2002 from complications of a liver transplant.
