= Rodger Brulotte =

Canadian baseball broadcaster (1947–2026)

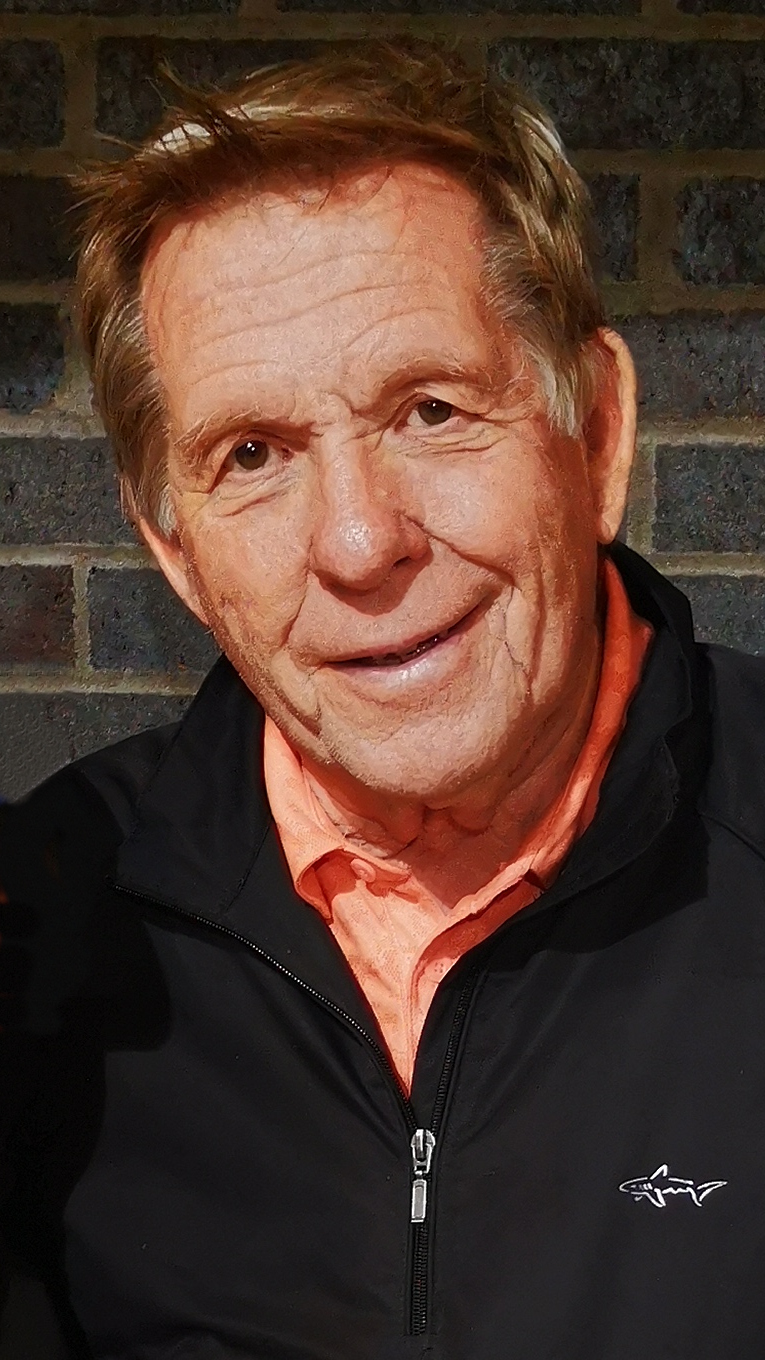
- Brulotte in 2023
- Born: 4 January 1947; Montreal, Quebec, Canada
- Died: 20 March 2026 (aged 79)
- Sports commentary career
- Teams: Montreal Expos; Toronto Blue Jays
- Genre: Color commentator
- Sport: Baseball
- Employer: CKAC, TVA Sports

Rodger Brulotte (4 January 1947 – 20 March 2026) was a Canadian Major League Baseball broadcaster.

== Life and career ==
His career with the Montreal Expos organization started in 1969, working in sales and marketing. He contributed to the creation of the Youppi mascot. In 1984, he was hired by CKAC to serve as colour commentator alongside Jacques Doucet.

In 1990, he moved to RDS where he called Expos games with his colleague Denis Casavant until the team's demise in 2004. He was famous for the line "Bonsoir, elle est partie!" (Good night, it is gone) which he said when the Expos hit a home run. Brulotte and Casavant continued to call baseball games on RDS, though coverage was limited. He later called Toronto Blue Jays games on TVA Sports alongside Doucet.

Brulotte wrote an article entitled “Tout partout” in Le Journal de Montréal. Brulotte was nominated for a Gemini Award in 1991 and 1993.

He missed broadcasting the Blue Jays games in the 2025 World Series alongside Casavant due to recovering from surgery to remove a cancerous tumour from his spine. Brulotte died on 20 March 2026, at the age of 79.
