= Jean-Pierre Roy =

Canadian baseball player (1920-2014)

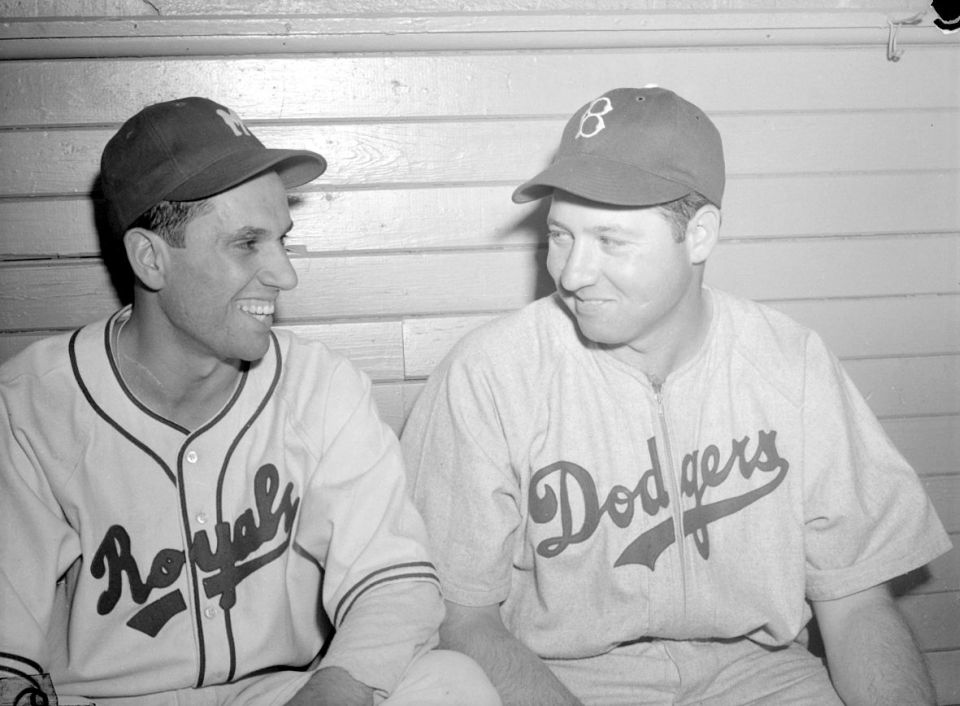
- Jean-Pierre Roy (left) with Hugh Casey (right) in Montreal, July 1946.
- Pitcher
- Born: June 26, 1920; Montreal, Quebec, Canada
- Died: November 1, 2014 (aged 94); Pompano Beach, Florida, United States
- Batted: Switch Threw: Right

MLB debut
- May 5, 1946, for the Brooklyn Dodgers

Last MLB appearance
- May 11, 1946, for the Brooklyn Dodgers

MLB statistics
- Win–loss record: 0–0
- Earned run average: 9.95
- Strikeouts: 6
- Stats at Baseball Reference

Teams
- Brooklyn Dodgers (1946)

Career highlights and awards
- Montreal Expos Hall of Fame

Member of the Canadian

Baseball Hall of Fame
- Induction: 2021

Jean-Pierre Roy (June 26, 1920 – November 1, 2014) was a Canadian pitcher in Major League Baseball. He pitched in three games during the 1946 season for the Brooklyn Dodgers. He was born in Montreal, Quebec.

While with the minor league Montreal Royals, Roy played with Jackie Robinson, the first African-American to play in the major leagues. Roy retained a friendship with Robinson's widow, Rachel Robinson.

The major highlight of his Montreal years was going 25–11 with a 3.72 ERA in the 1945 season and he compiled an overall 45–28 career record pitching with the Royals.

Roy was later a television commentator for the Montreal Expos from 1968 to 1984 and a public relations representative for the Expos.

He was inducted into the Montreal Expos Hall of Fame in 1995, and the Quebec Baseball Hall of Fame in 2001.

He died on November 1, 2014, at his Pompano Beach, Florida, winter home in the United States, at the age of 94.

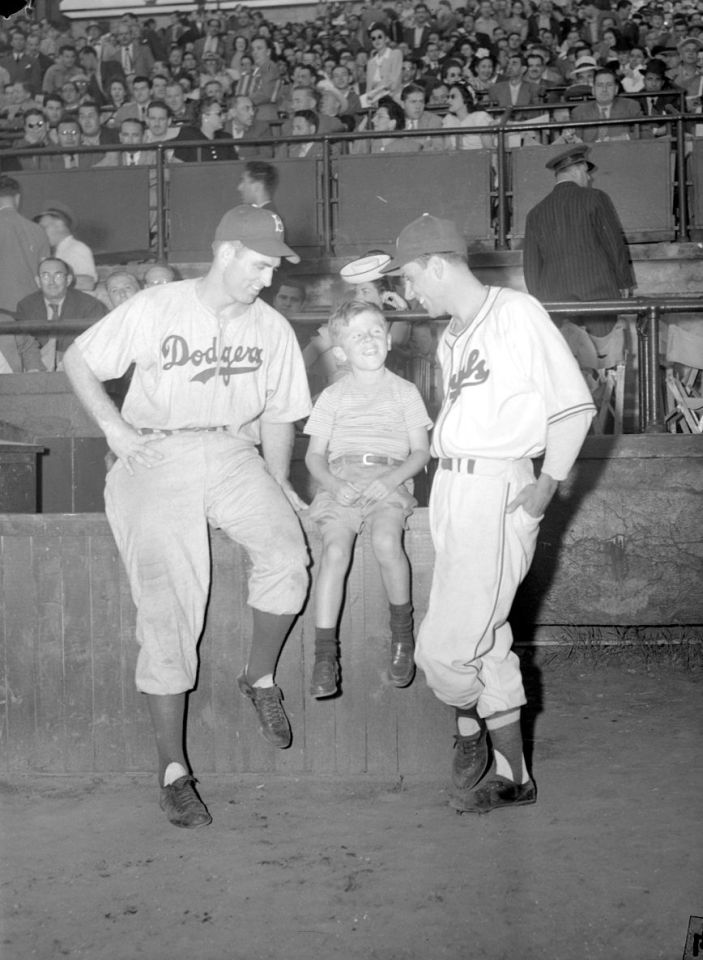
A young fan between Hugh Casey (left) and Jean-Pierre Roy (right) in Delorimier Stadium, Montreal, 6 July 1946.
