= Ron Reusch =

Canadian sportscaster

Ron Reusch is a Canadian sportscaster, active mostly from the 1960s through to 2006.

While living in Germany from 1959 to 1967, he worked for CBS Europe, the Canadian Forces Network, and a variety of German radio and television outlets.

When he returned to Canada, he started working for a radio station called CKGM in Montreal, and for years was part of the English broadcast crews of both the Montreal Canadiens and Montreal Expos. He worked for many years on the CTV Television Network and its Montréal affiliate, CFCF-TV, where he covered a variety of sports.

He was part of thirteen Olympic broadcasts, beginning with 1968 in Grenoble, France for CBS, where he broadcast ice hockey. For CTV, he covered the 1980 Winter Olympics in Lake Placid, New York (ice hockey), the 1988 Winter Olympics in Calgary, Alberta (ice hockey), the 1992 Summer Olympics in Barcelona, Spain (baseball), and the 1994 Winter Olympics in Lillehammer, Norway (speed skating).

Previously, he did play-by-play for CTV's coverage of the first three Canada Cup hockey tournaments, and he served as the colour commentator to Dan Kelly's play-by-play for CTV's NHL coverage for the 1984–85, 1985–86 seasons, and the 1987 Canada Cup.

During the firing of Marguerite Corriveau, a weatherperson for the station, Reusch emphasized that CFCF principal owner Jean Pouliot was a pro-unionist and that any statements he made beforehand were misinterpreted.

Preceded by Mickey Redmond, Dick Irvin Jr., and Gary Dornhoefer	Canadian network television color commentator 1985–1986	Succeeded by John Davidson
