= Jacques Doucet (sportscaster) =

Canadian baseball play-by-play announcer (1940–2026)

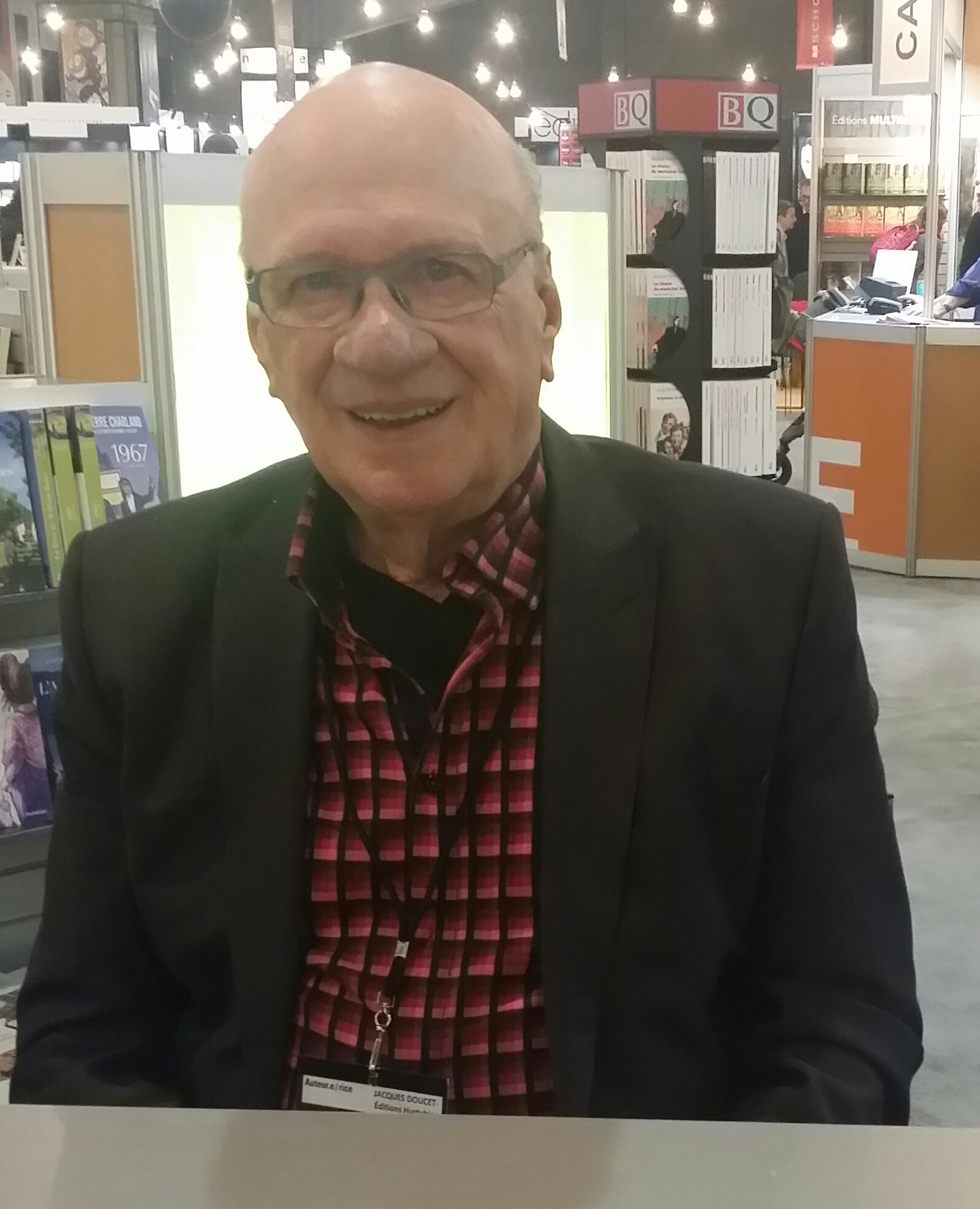
- Doucet in 2018
- Born: March 8, 1940; Montreal, Quebec, Canada
- Died: August 27, 2026 (aged 86)
- Years active: 1972–2022
- Awards: Montreal Expos Hall of Fame
- Sports commentary career
- Teams: Montreal Expos; Québec Capitales; Toronto Blue Jays
- Genre: Play-by-play
- Sport: Baseball
- Employer: CKAC 730; CHRC 800; TVA Sports
- Baseball career

Member of the Canadian

Baseball Hall of Fame
- Induction: 2020

Jacques Doucet (March 8, 1940 – August 27, 2026) was a Canadian French-language baseball play-by-play sportscaster. He broadcast Montreal Expos games for every year of the team's existence, from 1969 to 2004. After commenting on the Québec Capitales from 2006 to 2010, he became the French play-by-play voice of the Toronto Blue Jays on TVA Sports from 2011 until his retirement in 2022.

== Early life and career ==
Doucet was born in Montreal, Quebec, Canada on March 8, 1940. He began his career in 1959 as a translator for the Canadian Press news agency. After one year in 1960–1961 as a sports journalist for the short-lived Nouveau Journal daily, he went to La Presse in 1962, still as a sports journalist, where he remained until early 1972.

== Sports broadcasting ==
During a long strike in 1964 at La Presse, Doucet had a brief first experience in sports broadcasting for Montreal Alouettes football games.

Doucet got the assignment as the Montreal Expos beat writer for La Presse as soon as the franchise was awarded to Montreal in 1968, in addition to being the official scorer for games at Jarry Park.

Sometime in the middle of the Expos' first season in 1969, Doucet was asked to occasionally replace Jean-Pierre Roy as colour commentator on the now-defunct CKLM 1570, which held the French radio broadcast rights, as Roy moved to TV broadcasts once a week.

== Play-by-play ==
In 1972, as CKAC 730 became the Expos' new French radio flagship, Doucet was hired by the (now-defunct) Télémédia network to do play-by-play for all Montreal Expos games, in addition to the All-Star game, League Championship Series, and World Series games and a selection of pre-season Expos games.

When Télémédia merged with Radiomutuel on September 30, 1994, creating the new Radiomédia network, Doucet became an Expos employee and continued to do play-by-play but only for Montreal Expos games, which continued to be aired mostly on CKAC 730 until the end of 2003. He was heard for a few games on CKVL 850 (now CINF 690) in 1995, and on CJMS 1040 in 2002 and 2003. CHMP-FM 98.5 took over as the French radio flagship in 2004 for the last season of the Expos in Montreal.

Over his career, Doucet described more than 5,000 Major League Baseball games, including two perfect games, the first by Dennis Martínez in 1991 against the Los Angeles Dodgers and the second by New York Yankees pitcher David Cone against the Expos in 1999.

== Later career ==
In March 2005, Doucet became the official spokesperson for Encore Baseball Montréal, an organization initially created to keep the Expos in Montreal and which is now focused on promoting baseball in Quebec.

In June 2005, Doucet's efforts to create a French-language version of standard baseball terminology were underlined at length in a front-page story by the Wall Street Journal.

== Return to commentating ==
From 2006 to 2011, Doucet was the play-by-play voice for the home games of the Quebec Capitales. The Capitales played in the Can-Am League, an eight-team independent baseball league, during Doucet's term there, and their games are heard on CHRC 800 in Quebec City.

In August 2011, Doucet was hired by TVA Sports, a new sports television channel which went on the air a month later, as the play-by-play voice of the Toronto Blue Jays. He retired after the end of the 2022 season.

== Death ==
Doucet died on 27 August 2026, at the age of 86.

== Books ==
In collaboration with Marc Robitaille, Doucet has published a two-volume history of the Montreal Expos titled Il était une fois les Expos. The first volume was published in 2009 and the second volume was published in 2011.

Doucet previously published, in collaboration with Claude Raymond, a book titled Les secrets du baseball in 1980.

== Awards ==
Doucet was inducted into the Quebec Baseball Hall of Fame in 2002,, the Montreal Expos Hall of Fame in 2003 and the Canadian Baseball Hall of Fame in 2004.

While fans had hoped for many years Doucet would be recognized by the Cooperstown Baseball Hall of Fame via the Ford C. Frick Award, this has as yet not occurred (although he has been a finalist five times, including in 2011). Doucet has been described as "the French-Canadian equivalent of Jaime Jarrín" and even as "Canada's Vin Scully", however it has been noted "because he broadcast games in French, few of the people who cast final votes for admission to Cooperstown have heard Doucet work", where the language barrier might keep Doucet out of Cooperstown; at least one observer has suggested Doucet has failed to win the Award because he is not an American.
