= Claude Raymond =

Canadian baseball player (born 1937)

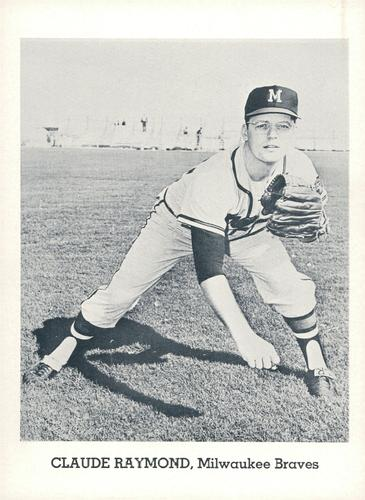
- Pitcher
- Born: May 7, 1937 (age 89); Saint-Jean-sur-Richelieu, Quebec, Canada
- Batted: Right Threw: Right

MLB debut
- April 15, 1959, for the Chicago White Sox

Last MLB appearance
- September 25, 1971, for the Montreal Expos

MLB statistics
- Win–loss record: 46–53
- Earned run average: 3.66
- Strikeouts: 497
- Saves: 82
- Stats at Baseball Reference

Teams
- Chicago White Sox (1959); Milwaukee Braves (1961–1963); Houston Colt .45s / Astros (1964–1967); Atlanta Braves (1967–1969); Montreal Expos (1969–1971)

Career highlights and awards
- All-Star (1966); Montreal Expos Hall of Fame

Member of the Canadian

Baseball Hall of Fame
- Induction: 1984

Joseph Claude Marc Raymond CM (born May 7, 1937), nicknamed "Frenchy", is a Canadian former professional baseball relief pitcher, coach, and broadcaster. During his 12-year career in Major League Baseball, he played for the Chicago White Sox (1959), Milwaukee/Atlanta Braves (1961–63, 1967–69), Houston Colt .45s/Astros (1964–67) and Montreal Expos (1969–71).

== Playing career ==
Raymond pitched in three games for Chicago in early 1959. Although he was traded from the National League West-leading Atlanta Braves to the expansion Montreal Expos in 1969, Raymond remarked this was one of the happiest moments of his life as he was able to play for his home province.

In 12 seasons, he compiled a 46–53 record, appeared in 449 games, started 7 games, recorded 2 complete games, 270 games finished, 82 saves, 721 innings pitched, 711 hits allowed, 338 runs allowed, 293 earned runs allowed, 75 home runs allowed, 225 walks allowed, 497 strikeouts, 28 hit batsmen, 32 wild pitches, 3,048 batters faced, 54 intentional walks, 4 balks and a 3.66 ERA.

== Post-playing career ==
After his playing career, Raymond worked as a French-language broadcaster with the Expos from 1972 to 2001. He was also an Expos English-language broadcaster in 2004, their last season in Montreal.

During the 1996 Summer Olympics in Atlanta, Raymond was the public address announcer for baseball. The International Olympic Committee required that announcements at Olympic venues must also be made in French, which made Raymond, who had previously pitched in Atlanta, well-suited for the job.

Raymond joined the Expos staff as a roving coach in 2002 and served until the team left Montreal after the 2004 campaign to become the Washington Nationals.

== Honours and awards ==
Raymond was named to the 1966 National League All-Star Team. Raymond was inducted into the Canadian Baseball Hall of Fame, located in St. Marys, Ontario, with the Class of 1984 in its second year of operation.

In June 2019 Raymond was appointed a Member of the Order of Canada.
