= Dave Van Horne =

American baseball announcer (born 1939)

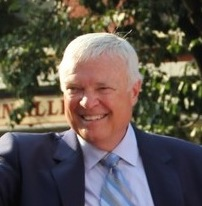
- Van Horne in 2011
- Born: David Van Horne; August 25, 1939 (age 87); Easton, Pennsylvania, U.S.
- Awards: Montreal Expos Hall of Fame; Ford C. Frick Award (2011)
- Baseball career

Member of the Canadian

Baseball Hall of Fame
- Induction: 2014

David Van Horne (born August 25, 1939) is an American former Major League Baseball broadcaster whose big-league announcing career lasted for 53 seasons. He was honoured at the National Baseball Hall of Fame as winner of the Ford C. Frick Award in 2011.

Van Horne was the lead play-by-play announcer for the Miami Marlins Radio Network from 2001 through 2021; prior to that, he spent 32 years of his broadcasting career with the Montreal Expos, 14 of those years partnered with Duke Snider. In 2003, he described games of the World Series-champion Florida Marlins.

== Early life and education ==
Van Horne attended and graduated from Wilson Area High School in Easton, Pennsylvania in 1957. Van Horne entered the drama department at the Richmond Professional Institute in Richmond, Virginia.

== Career ==
While attending Richmond Professional Institute, he began hosting a Top 40 program at a local radio station, which led to his dropping out of school and starting a full-time broadcasting career in Roanoke, where he began calling high school football and basketball. This led in turn to Van Horne calling baseball for the Richmond Braves, the Class AAA affiliate of the Atlanta Braves, beginning in 1966. He was hired by the Montreal Expos for their inaugural season in 1969.

=== Montreal Expos (1969–2000) ===
Van Horne broadcast the Expos first home game on April 14, 1969, and their ninth game on April 17, when Bill Stoneman pitched a no-hitter against the Philadelphia Phillies. Across his tenure, he also got to call Willie Mays' 3,000th hit, Pete Rose's 4,000th hit, and two additional no-hitters (another by Stoneman in 1972, and Charlie Lea's in 1980).

Van Horne is well known for his "El Presidente, El Perfecto!" call, made when Montreal Expos pitcher Dennis Martínez completed his perfect game against the Los Angeles Dodgers on July 28, 1991. With the Expos, his sign-in phrase "Thanks Duke and hi again, everybody. Glad to have you aboard for today's game...", and home run call "up, up and away" projected his enthusiasm and excitement.

In 2000, as the Expos had not secured an English radio or television contract, Van Horne broadcast the season over the Internet. With the Expos broadcast situation still unsettled for the 2001 season, Van Horne left at the end of 2000 to broadcast for the Marlins.

=== Florida/Miami Marlins (2001–2021) ===
Beginning in 2001, Van Horne broadcast games for the Marlins. During his time in Florida, he called the 2003 World Series championship.

Van Horne broadcast the last Expos home game in Montreal from the Marlins' broadcast booth on September 29, 2004—a 9–1 win for Florida. After the game was over, Van Horne joined the Expos television crew for a special post-game show.

By the 2020s, Van Horne had his schedule reduced substantially on the order of the radio station. After calling 54 games in 2021, he was offered a 20-game schedule for the 2022 season. In January 2022, Van Horne rejected the offer and instead officially announced his retirement from broadcasting.

== Awards and honors ==
Van Horne was named the 1996 recipient of the Jack Graney Award by the Canadian Baseball Hall of Fame for "A lifetime of media achievement". He was inducted into the Canadian Baseball Hall of Fame on June 21, 2014, along with former Montreal Expos general manager Murray Cook and third baseman Tim Wallach.

Van Horne is the 2011 recipient of the Ford C. Frick Award from the National Baseball Hall of Fame. He received the award on July 23, 2011 in Cooperstown, New York.

== Personal life ==
Van Horne is married to his wife Josée, with whom he has six children: David, Jim, Jeff, Dewayne, Jon, and Madison.
