= 1981 Montreal Expos season =

1981 Montreal Expos
- National League East champions
- League: National League
- Division: East
- Ballpark: Olympic Stadium
- City: Montreal
- Record: 1st half: 30–25 (.545) 2nd half: 30–23 (.566) Overall: 60–48 (.556)
- Divisional place: 1st half: 3rd 2nd half: 1st Overall: 2nd
- Owners: Charles Bronfman
- General managers: John McHale
- Managers: Dick Williams, Jim Fanning
- Television: CBC Television (Dave Van Horne, Duke Snider); Télévision de Radio-Canada (Jean-Pierre Roy, Guy Ferron)
- Radio: CFCF (English) (Dave Van Horne, Duke Snider, Ron Reusch); CKAC (French) (Claude Raymond, Jacques Doucet)

The 1981 Montreal Expos season was the 13th season in franchise history. They made it to the postseason for the first time in franchise history. Their playoff run ended in the NLCS against the Los Angeles Dodgers, with Rick Monday hitting a ninth-inning solo home run in game 5, subsequently referred to as "Blue Monday" by Expos fans. This was the closest the Expos ever got to a World Series appearance while in Montreal. This was also their last time winning a playoff series until 2019, which they won the Wild Card game. The season was separated into two halves due to the 1981 Major League Baseball strike.

This would be the first and only time the team made the postseason as the Montreal Expos. The next time the franchise would reach the playoffs was in the 2012 season, after relocating to Washington, D.C., and becoming the Washington Nationals. The 30-year postseason drought set a Major League Baseball record for the longest in MLB history.

== Offseason ==
- December 8, 1980: Jack O'Connor was drafted from the Expos by the Minnesota Twins in the rule 5 draft.
- December 12, 1980: Tony Bernazard was traded by the Expos to the Chicago White Sox for Rich Wortham.
- December 12, 1980: Willie Montañez was signed as a free agent by the Expos.
- January 15, 1981: Ken Macha was purchased from the Expos by the Toronto Blue Jays.
- February 18, 1981: Ray Burris was signed as a free agent by the Expos.

== Spring training ==
After holding spring training at City Island Ball Park in Daytona Beach, Florida, from 1973 to 1980, the Expos returned to West Palm Beach Municipal Stadium in West Palm Beach, Florida – a facility they shared with the Atlanta Braves – for spring training in 1981. It was their fifth season at the stadium; they also had conducted spring training there from 1969 to 1972. The Expos would train at Municipal Stadium through 1997.

== Regular season ==
- April 29, 1981: Steve Carlton struck out Tim Wallach for the 3000th strikeout of his career.
- May 10, 1981: Charlie Lea pitched a no-hitter against the San Francisco Giants, defeating them 4–0 at Olympic Stadium. The last out was recorded by Andre Dawson in center field. Lea would go on to shut out the Giants again a week later on four hits in San Francisco for good measure.

=== Game log ===
==== First half ====
1981 Regular Season Game Log First Half (30–25) (Home: 21–7; Road: 9–18)
April (12–4) (Home: 8–0; Road: 4–4)

#	Date	Opponent	Score	Win	Loss	Save	Attendance	Record	Report
1	April 9	@ Pirates	6–5	Fryman (1–0)	Tekulve (0–1)		40,332	1–0	Boxscore
2	April 12	@ Pirates	2–3	Rhoden (1–0)	Burris (0–1)	Romo (1)	8,430	1–1	Boxscore
3	April 15	Cubs	5–4	Bahnsen (1–0)	Tidrow (1–1)		30,003	2–1	Boxscore
4	April 16	Cubs	7–0	Sanderson (1–0)	McGlothen (0–1)		11,602	3–1	Boxscore
5	April 18	@ Mets	5–3	Gullickson (1–0)	Jones (0–1)	Bahnsen (1)	23,710	4–1	Boxscore
6	April 19	@ Mets	4–3	Burris (1–1)	Swan (0–1)	Fryman (1)	N/A	5–1	Boxscore
7	April 19	@ Mets	2–7	Zachry (3–0)	Lea (0–1)		21,464	5–2	Boxscore
8	April 20	Phillies	9–8	Rogers (1–0)	McGraw (1–1)	Fryman (2)	24,817	6–2	Boxscore
9	April 21	Phillies	10–3	Sanderson (2–0)	Ruthven (2–1)		10,887	7–2	Boxscore
10	April 22	Phillies	4–3 (11 inn.)	Sosa (1–0)	McGraw (1–2)		14,176	8–2	Boxscore
	April 24	Mets	Postponed (rain); rescheduled for April 26						
11	April 25	Mets	4–2	Rogers (2–0)	Jones (0–2)	Lee (1)	18,150	9–2	Boxscore
12	April 26	Mets	8–4	Burris (2–1)	Zachry (3–1)		N/A	10–2	Boxscore
13	April 26	Mets	7–6	Sanderson (3–0)	Swan (0–2)	Fryman (3)	41,697	11–2	Boxscore
14	April 27	@ Phillies	1–3	Ruthven (3–1)	Gullickson (1–1)		27,347	11–3	Boxscore
15	April 28	@ Phillies	6–3	Ratzer (1–0)	Christenson (1–2)	Sosa (1)	26,192	12–3	Boxscore
16	April 29	@ Phillies	2–6	Carlton (4–0)	Rogers (2–1)		30,142	12–4	Boxscore

May (14–15) (Home: 10–7; Road: 4–8)

#	Date	Opponent	Score	Win	Loss	Save	Attendance	Record	Report
17	May 1	Dodgers	9–8 (13 inn.)	Lee (1–0)	Castillo (0–2)		28,179	13–4	Boxscore
18	May 2	Dodgers	0–4	Reuss (2–1)	Sanderson (3–1)		22,820	13–5	Boxscore
19	May 3	Dodgers	1–6 (10 inn.)	Valenzuela (6–0)	Gullickson (1–2)		46,405	13–6	Boxscore
20	May 4	Dodgers	4–3	Rogers (3–1)	Sutcliffe (2–2)	Sosa (2)	21,527	14–6	Boxscore
21	May 5	Padres	4–3	Fryman (2–0)			15,909	15–6	Boxscore
22	May 6	Padres	5–13		Burris (2–2)		13,066	15–7	Boxscore
23	May 7	Padres	2–1	Sanderson (4–1)			12,248	16–7	Boxscore
24	May 8	Giants	3–4		Gullickson (1–3)		21,850	16–8	Boxscore
25	May 9	Giants	2–8		Rogers (3–2)		48,149	16–9	Boxscore
26	May 10	Giants	1–5		Lee (1–1)		N/A	16–10	Boxscore
27	May 10	Giants	4–0	Lea (1–1)			25,343	17–10	Boxscore
28	May 12	@ Dodgers	0–5	Hooton (5–0)	Burris (2–3)	Howe (4)	34,367	17–11	Boxscore
29	May 13	@ Dodgers	6–8	Howe (2–1)	Fryman (2–1)		42,712	17–12	Boxscore
30	May 14	@ Dodgers	2–3	Valenzuela (8–0)	Ratzer (1–1)		53,906	17–13	Boxscore
31	May 15	@ Giants	2–4		Rogers (3–3)		19,763	17–14	Boxscore
32	May 16	@ Giants	5–0	Lea (2–1)			11,133	18–14	Boxscore
33	May 17	@ Giants	4–5 (12 inn.)		Lee (1–2)		27,975	18–15	Boxscore
34	May 18	@ Padres	3–2 (10 inn.)	Fryman (3–1)		Lee (2)	13,283	19–15	Boxscore
35	May 19	@ Padres	1–3		Gullickson (1–4)		6,871	19–16	Boxscore
36	May 20	@ Padres	6–2	Rogers (4–3)			9,336	20–16	Boxscore
37	May 22	@ Cubs	6–3	Lea (3–1)	Krukow (1–5)		6,071	21–16	Boxscore
38	May 23	@ Cubs	4–6	Reuschel (2–5)	Burris (2–4)	Tidrow (2)	15,981	21–17	Boxscore
39	May 24	@ Cubs	2–6	Caudill (1–3)	Sanderson (4–2)	Tidrow (3)	10,821	21–18	Boxscore
40	May 25	Cardinals	5–3	Gullickson (2–4)		Lee (3)	24,490	22–18	Boxscore
41	May 26	Cardinals	4–3	Rogers (5–3)		Sosa (3)	27,775	23–18	Boxscore
42	May 27	Cardinals	4–1	Lea (4–1)		Lee (4)	24,709	24–18	Boxscore
43	May 29	Pirates	3–2	Sanderson (5–2)	Bibby (3–3)	Lee (5)	36,662	25–18	Boxscore
44	May 30	Pirates	2–3	Rhoden (6–0)	Gullickson (2–5)		31,649	25–19	Boxscore
45	May 31	Pirates	5–1	Rogers (6–3)	Pérez (2–1)		45,783	26–19	Boxscore

June (4–6) (Home: 3–0; Road: 1–6)

#	Date	Opponent	Score	Win	Loss	Save	Attendance	Record	Report
46	June 1	@ Cardinals	2–4		Lea (4–2)		14,224	26–20	Boxscore
47	June 2	@ Cardinals	8–1	Burris (3–4)			14,697	27–20	Boxscore
48	June 3	@ Cardinals	2–3 (11 inn.)		Sosa (1–1)		13,085	27–21	Boxscore
49	June 4	@ Cardinals	1–4		Gullickson (2–6)		18,958	27–22	Boxscore
50	June 5	@ Reds	3–6		Rogers (6–4)			27–23	Boxscore
51	June 6	@ Reds	3–9		Lea (4–3)			27–24	Boxscore
52	June 7	@ Reds	0–2		Burris (3–5)			27–25	Boxscore
53	June 9	Braves	12–1	Sanderson (6–2)				28–25	Boxscore
54	June 10	Braves	11–2	Gullickson (3–6)				29–25	Boxscore
55	June 11	Braves	7–0	Rogers (7–4)				30–25	Boxscore

==== Games cancelled ====
1981 Games cancelled
April

#	Date	Opponent	Score	Win	Loss	Save	Attendance	Record	Report
	April 11	@ Pirates	Cancelled (strike)						
	April 14	Cubs	Cancelled (strike)						

June

#	Date	Opponent	Score	Win	Loss	Save	Attendance	Record	Report
	June 12	Reds	Cancelled (strike)						
	June 13	Reds	Cancelled (strike)						
	June 14	Reds	Cancelled (strike)						
	June 15	Astros	Cancelled (strike)						
	June 16	Astros	Cancelled (strike)						
	June 17	@ Braves	Cancelled (strike)						
	June 18	@ Braves	Cancelled (strike)						
	June 19	@ Astros	Cancelled (strike)						
	June 20	@ Astros	Cancelled (strike)						
	June 21	@ Astros	Cancelled (strike)						
	June 23	Mets	Cancelled (strike)						
	June 24	Mets	Cancelled (strike)						
	June 25	Mets	Cancelled (strike)						
	June 26	Cubs	Cancelled (strike)						
	June 27	Cubs	Cancelled (strike)						
	June 28	Cubs	Cancelled (strike)						
	June 29	@ Pirates	Cancelled (strike)						
	June 30	@ Pirates	Cancelled (strike)						

July

#	Date	Opponent	Score	Win	Loss	Save	Attendance	Record	Report
	July 1	Pirates	Cancelled (strike)						
	July 2	Pirates	Cancelled (strike)						
	July 3	@ Phillies	Cancelled (strike)						
	July 4	@ Phillies	Cancelled (strike)						
	July 5	@ Phillies	Cancelled (strike)						
	July 7	@ Cubs	Cancelled (strike)						
	July 8	@ Cubs	Cancelled (strike)						
	July 9	@ Cubs	Cancelled (strike)						
	July 10	@ Cardinals	Cancelled (strike)						
	July 11	@ Cardinals	Cancelled (strike)						
	July 12	@ Cardinals	Cancelled (strike)						
	July 16	Dodgers	Cancelled (strike)						
	July 17	Dodgers	Cancelled (strike)						
	July 18	Padres	Cancelled (strike)						
	July 19	Padres	Cancelled (strike)						
	July 20	Padres	Cancelled (strike)						
	July 21	Giants	Cancelled (strike)						
	July 22	Giants	Cancelled (strike)						
	July 24	@ Dodgers	Cancelled (strike)						
	July 25	@ Dodgers	Cancelled (strike)						
	July 26	@ Dodgers	Cancelled (strike)						
	July 28	@ Giants	Cancelled (strike)						
	July 29	@ Giants	Cancelled (strike)						
	July 30	@ Giants	Cancelled (strike)						
	July 31	@ Padres	Cancelled (strike)						

August

#	Date	Opponent	Score	Win	Loss	Save	Attendance	Record	Report
	August 1	@ Padres	Cancelled (strike)						
	August 2	@ Padres	Cancelled (strike)						
	August 4	@ Mets	Cancelled (strike)						
	August 5	@ Mets	Cancelled (strike)						
	August 6	@ Mets	Cancelled (strike)						
	August 7	Phillies	Cancelled (strike)						
	August 8	Phillies	Cancelled (strike)						
	August 9	Phillies	Cancelled (strike)						
	August 9	Phillies	Cancelled (strike)						

==== Second half ====
1981 Regular Season Game Log Second Half (30–23) (Home: 17–11; Road: 13–12)
August (11–8) (Home: 6–3; Road: 5–5)

#	Date	Opponent	Score	Win	Loss	Save	Attendance	Record	Report
All-Star Break: NL def. AL at Cleveland Stadium, 5–4
56	August 10	Pirates	3–1	Lee (2–2)	Pérez (2–3)		37,275	31–25	Boxscore
57	August 11	Pirates	3–6	Tekulve (3–3)	Fryman (3–2)		33,045	31–26	Boxscore
58	August 12	@ Pirates	3–2	Burris (4–5)	Solomon (5–4)	Lee (6)	12,069	32–26	Boxscore
59	August 13	@ Pirates	7–2	Rogers (8–4)	Tiant (0–1)		11,735	33–26	Boxscore
60	August 14	Cardinals	1–3		Sanderson (6–3)		40,187	33–27	Boxscore
	August 15	Cardinals	Postponed (rain); rescheduled for September 15						
	August 16	Cardinals	Postponed (rain); rescheduled for September 16						
61	August 17	@ Astros	6–2	Burris (5–5)		Fryman (4)		34–27	Boxscore
62	August 18	@ Astros	2–4		Rogers (8–5)			34–28	Boxscore
63	August 19	@ Astros	1–9		Sanderson (6–4)			34–29	Boxscore
64	August 21	@ Braves	4–1 (11 inn.)	Fryman (4–2)				35–29	Boxscore
65	August 22	@ Braves	5–4	Bahnsen (2–0)		Reardon (1)		36–29	Boxscore
66	August 22	@ Braves	1–9		Lea (4–4)			36–30	Boxscore
67	August 23	@ Braves	1–2		Rogers (8–6)			36–31	Boxscore
68	August 25	Reds	9–1	Sanderson (7–4)				37–31	Boxscore
69	August 26	Reds	6–0	Gullickson (4–6)				38–31	Boxscore
70	August 27	Reds	12–0	Burris (6–5)				39–31	Boxscore
71	August 28	Braves	3–0	Rogers (9–6)				40–31	Boxscore
72	August 29	Braves	4–3	Reardon (1–0)				41–31	Boxscore
73	August 30	Braves	4–5 (12 inn.)		Lee (2–3)			41–32	Boxscore
74	August 31	@ Reds	8–9		Lee (2–4)			41–33	Boxscore

September (16–14) (Home: 11–8; Road: 5–6)

#	Date	Opponent	Score	Win	Loss	Save	Attendance	Record	Report
75	September 1	@ Reds	4–3	Lea (5–4)		Reardon (2)		42–33	Boxscore
76	September 2	@ Reds	0–7		Bahnsen (2–1)			42–34	Boxscore
77	September 3	Astros	1–2		Sanderson (7–5)			42–35	Boxscore
78	September 4	Astros	0–5		Gullickson (4–7)			42–36	Boxscore
79	September 5	Astros	5–2	Burris (7–5)				43–36	Boxscore
80	September 6	Astros	3–4 (12 inn.)		Sosa (1–2)			43–37	Boxscore
81	September 7	@ Phillies	5–4	Fryman (5–2)	Proly (2–1)	Reardon (3)	31,401	45–36	Boxscore
82	September 8	@ Phillies	5–10	Larson (1–0)	Sanderson (7–6)		11,812	45–37	Boxscore
83	September 9	@ Phillies	8–11	Reed (4–1)	Fryman (5–3)	Lyle (1)	25,468	45–38	Boxscore
84	September 11	@ Cubs	5–6	Griffin (2–2)	Burris (7–6)	Hernández (2)	7,204	45–39	Boxscore
85	September 12	@ Cubs	2–0	Rogers (10–6)	Bird (4–3)	Reardon (4)	18,124	45–40	Boxscore
86	September 13	@ Cubs	10–6	Sanderson (8–6)	Krukow (6–9)		14,589	46–40	Boxscore
87	September 15	Cardinals	2–3		Gullickson (3–8)		N/A	46–41	Boxscore
88	September 15	Cardinals	4–3	Lee (3–4)		Fryman (5)	41,671	47–41	Boxscore
89	September 16	Cardinals	1–7		Burris (7–7)		N/A	47–42	Boxscore
90	September 16	Cardinals	4–3 (11 inn.)	Reardon (2–0)			30,222	48–42	Boxscore
91	September 17	Cardinals	4–7		Rogers (10–7)		26,390	48–43	Boxscore
92	September 18	Cubs	11–0	Sanderson (9–6)	Bird (4–4)		23,606	49–43	Boxscore
93	September 19	Cubs	1–2	Krukow (7–9)	Lee (3–5)	Martz (4)	30,099	49–44	Boxscore
94	September 20	Cubs	4–0	Gullickson (4–8)	Griffin (2–4)		40,851	50–44	Boxscore
95	September 21	Phillies	1–0 (17 inn.)	Smith (1–0)	Reed (0–1)		24,161	51–44	Boxscore
96	September 22	Phillies	6–2	Rogers (11–7)	Ruthven (11–6)		21,797	52–44	Boxscore
97	September 23	Pirates	3–2	Jackson (2–2)	Rhoden (8–4)		10,081	53–44	Boxscore
98	September 24	Pirates	7–1	Lee (4–5)	Jones (4–4)		23,459	54–44	Boxscore
99	September 25	Mets	6–3	Gullickson (5–8)	Zachry (7–13)		41,354	55–44	Boxscore
100	September 26	Mets	4–2	Burris (8–7)	Harris (3–5)	Fryman (6)	38,821	56–44	Boxscore
101	September 27	Mets	1–2	Scott (5–10)	Rogers (11–8)	Allen (18)	52,089	56–45	Boxscore
102	September 28	@ Cardinals	2–6		Sanderson (9–7)		21,216	56–46	Boxscore
103	September 29	@ Cardinals	4–8		Lee (4–6)		40,488	56–47	Boxscore
104	September 30	@ Pirates	3–2	Gullickson (6–8)	Solomon (8–6)	Fryman (7)	5,826	57–47	Boxscore

October (3–1) (Road: 3–1)

#	Date	Opponent	Score	Win	Loss	Save	Attendance	Record	Report
105	October 1	@ Pirates	5–2	Burris (9–7)	Tiant (2–5)	Reardon (5)	2,931	58–47	Boxscore
106	October 2	@ Mets	3–0	Rogers (12–8)	Zachry (7–14)		6,720	59–47	Boxscore
107	October 3	@ Mets	5–4	Lee (5–6)	Allen (7–6)	Reardon (6)	17,954	60–47	Boxscore
108	October 4	@ Mets	1–2	Falcone (5–3)	Gullickson (6–9)		7,618	60–48	Boxscore

Legend
Expos win	Expos loss	All-Star Game	Game postponed

=== Season standings ===
NL East
Team	W	L	Pct.	GB	Home	Road
St. Louis Cardinals	59	43	.578	—	32‍–‍21	27‍–‍22
Montreal Expos	60	48	.556	2	38‍–‍18	22‍–‍30
Philadelphia Phillies	59	48	.551	2½	36‍–‍19	23‍–‍29
Pittsburgh Pirates	46	56	.451	13	22‍–‍28	24‍–‍28
New York Mets	41	62	.398	18½	24‍–‍27	17‍–‍35
Chicago Cubs	38	65	.369	21½	27‍–‍30	11‍–‍35

NL East First Half Standings	W	L	Pct.	GB
Philadelphia Phillies	34	21	.618	—
St. Louis Cardinals	30	20	.600	1 1/2
Montreal Expos	30	25	.545	4
Pittsburgh Pirates	25	23	.521	5 1/2
New York Mets	17	34	.333	15
Chicago Cubs	15	37	.288	17 1/2

NL East Second Half Standings	W	L	Pct.	GB
Montreal Expos	30	23	.566	—
St. Louis Cardinals	29	23	.558	1/2
Philadelphia Phillies	25	27	.481	4 1/2
New York Mets	24	28	.462	5 1/2
Chicago Cubs	23	28	.451	6
Pittsburgh Pirates	21	33	.389	9 1/2

=== Record vs. opponents ===
1981 National League record Sources:
Team	ATL	CHC	CIN	HOU	LAD	MON	NYM	PHI	PIT	SD	SF	STL
Atlanta	—	3–2–1	6–5	4–8	7–7	3–7	3–3	4–5	2–3	9–6	5–7	4–3
Chicago	2–3–1	—	1–5	1–6	6–4	4–7	5–8–1	2–10	4–10	3–3	5–5	5–4–1
Cincinnati	5–6	5–1	—	8–4	8–8	5–4	7–3	5–2	4–2	10–2	9–5	0–5
Houston	8–4	6–1	4–8	—	4–8	5–2	6–3	4–6	2–4	11–3	9–6	2–4
Los Angeles	7–7	4–6	8–8	8–4	—	5–2	5–1	3–3	5–1	6–5	7–5	5–5
Montreal	7–3	7–4	4–5	2–5	2–5	—	9–3	7–4	10–3	4–2	2–5	6–9
New York	3–3	8–5–1	3–7	3–6	1–5	3–9	—	7–7	3–6–1	2–5	2–4	6–5
Philadelphia	5-4	10–2	2–5	6–4	3–3	4–7	7–7	—	7–5	4–2	4–3	7–6
Pittsburgh	3–2	10–4	2–4	4–2	1–5	3–10	6–3–1	5–7	—	6–4	3–7	3–8
San Diego	6–9	3–3	2–10	3–11	5–6	2–4	5–2	2–4	4–6	—	6–7	3–7
San Francisco	7–5	5–5	5–9	6–9	5–7	5–2	4–2	3–4	7–3	7–6	—	2–3
St. Louis	3–4	4–5–1	5–0	4–2	5–5	9–6	5–6	6–7	8–3	7–3	3–2	—

=== Notable transactions ===
- April 1, 1981: John Tamargo was released by the Expos.
- May 29, 1981: Ellis Valentine was traded by the Expos to the New York Mets for Jeff Reardon and Dan Norman.
- June 8, 1981: 1981 Major League Baseball draft
  - Mike Fuentes was drafted by the Expos in the 2nd round.
  - Mark McGwire was drafted by the Expos in the 8th round.
  - Marvin Freeman was drafted by the Expos in the 9th round, but did not sign.
  - Al Newman was drafted by the Expos in the 1st round (12th pick) of the Secondary Phase.
- August 20, 1981: Willie Montañez was traded by the Expos to the Pittsburgh Pirates for John Milner.

=== Major League debuts ===
- Batters:
  - Terry Francona (Aug 19)
  - Mike Gates (May 6)
  - Dave Hostetler (Sep 15)
  - Tony Johnson (Sep 27)
  - Wallace Johnson (Sep 8)
  - Pat Rooney (Sep 9)
  - Chris Smith (May 14)
  - Tom Wieghaus (Oct 4)
- Pitchers:
  - Rick Engle (Sep 2)
  - Tom Gorman (Sep 2)
  - Bryn Smith (Sep 8)

=== Opening Day starters ===
- Gary Carter
- Warren Cromartie
- Andre Dawson
- Larry Parrish
- Tim Raines
- Steve Rogers
- Rodney Scott
- Chris Speier
- Ellis Valentine

=== Roster ===
1981 Montreal Expos
Roster
Pitchers: 22 Stan Bahnsen; 48 Ray Burris; 51 Rick Engle; 35 Woodie Fryman; 32 Tom Gorman; 34 Bill Gullickson; 19 Grant Jackson; 53 Charlie Lea; 37 Bill Lee; 47 Steve Ratzer; 31 Jeff Reardon; 45 Steve Rogers; 21 Scott Sanderson; 66 Bryn Smith; 27 Elías Sosa	Catchers: 8 Gary Carter; 44 Bobby Ramos; 50 Tom Wieghaus; Infielders: 33 Dan Briggs; 49 Warren Cromartie; 19 Mike Gates; 55 Dave Hostetler; 14 Tommy Hutton; 62 Wallace Johnson; 43 Jerry Manuel; 2 Brad Mills; 5 John Milner; 5 Willie Montañez; 15 Larry Parrish; 12 Mike Phillips; 3 Rodney Scott; 6 Chris Smith; 4 Chris Speier	Outfielders: 10 Andre Dawson; 16 Terry Francona; 42 Tony Johnson; 25 Rowland Office; 24 Bob Pate; 30 Tim Raines; 56 Pat Rooney; 17 Ellis Valentine; 29 Tim Wallach; 18 Jerry White	Manager: 6 Jim Fanning; 23 Dick Williams; Coaches: 41 Steve Boros (Bench); 39 Pat Mullin (Hitting); 9 Vern Rapp (First Base); 40 Norm Sherry (Bullpen); 1 Ozzie Virgil (Third Base)

== Player stats ==
=== Batting ===
==== Starters by position ====
Note: Pos = Position; G = Games played; AB = At bats; H = Hits; Avg. = Batting average; HR = Home runs; RBI = Runs batted in

Pos	Player	G	AB	H	Avg.	HR	RBI
C	Gary Carter	100	374	94	.251	16	68
1B	Warren Cromartie	99	358	109	.304	6	42
2B	Rodney Scott	95	336	69	.205	0	26
3B	Larry Parrish	128	440	116	.264	17	62
SS	Chris Speier	96	307	69	.225	2	25
LF	Tim Raines	88	313	95	.304	5	37
CF	Andre Dawson	103	394	119	.302	24	64
RF	Tim Wallach	71	212	50	.236	4	13

==== Other batters ====
Note: G = Games played; AB = At bats; H = Hits; Avg. = Batting average; HR = Home runs; RBI = Runs batted in

Player	G	AB	H	Avg.	HR	RBI
Jerry White	59	119	26	.218	3	11
Terry Francona	34	95	26	.274	1	8
John Milner	31	76	18	.237	3	9
Ellis Valentine	22	76	16	.211	3	15
Willie Montañez	26	62	11	.177	0	5
Jerry Manuel	27	55	11	.200	3	10
Mike Phillips	34	55	12	.218	0	4
Bobby Ramos	26	41	8	.195	1	3
Rowland Office	26	40	7	.175	0	0
Tommy Hutton	31	29	3	.103	0	2
Brad Mills	17	21	5	.238	0	1
Dan Briggs	9	11	1	.091	0	0
Wallace Johnson	11	9	2	.222	0	3
Chris Smith	7	7	0	.000	0	0
Bob Pate	8	6	2	.333	0	0
Dave Hostetler	5	6	3	.500	1	1
Pat Rooney	4	5	0	.000	0	0
Mike Gates	1	2	1	.500	0	1
Tony Johnson	2	1	0	.000	0	0
Tom Wieghaus	1	1	0	.000	0	0

=== Pitching ===
==== Starting pitchers ====
Note: G = Games pitched, IP = Innings pitched; W = Wins; L = Losses; ERA = Earned run average; SO = Strikeouts

Player	G	IP	W	L	ERA	SO
Steve Rogers	22	160.2	12	8	3.42	87
Bill Gullickson	22	157.1	7	9	2.80	115
Scott Sanderson	22	137.1	9	7	2.95	77
Ray Burris	22	135.2	9	7	3.05	52

==== Other pitchers ====
Note: G = Games pitched; IP = Innings pitched; W = Wins; L = Losses; ERA = Earned run average; SO = Strikeouts

Player	G	IP	W	L	ERA	SO
Bill Lee	31	88.2	5	6	2.94	34
Charlie Lea	16	64.1	5	4	4.62	31

==== Relief pitchers ====
Note: G = Games pitched; IP = Innings pitched; W = Wins; L = Losses; SV = Saves; ERA = Earned run average; SO = Strikeouts

Player	G	IP	W	L	SV	ERA	SO
Woodie Fryman	35	43.0	5	3	7	1.88	25
Jeff Reardon	25	41.2	2	0	6	1.30	21
Elías Sosa	32	39.1	1	2	3	3.66	18
Stan Bahnsen	25	49.0	2	1	1	4.96	28
Steve Ratzer	12	17.1	1	1	0	6.23	4
Tom Gorman	9	15.0	0	0	0	4.20	13
Bryn Smith	7	13.0	1	0	0	2.77	9
Grant Jackson	10	10.2	1	0	0	7.59	4
Rick Engle	1	2.0	0	0	0	18.00	2

== Postseason ==
=== Game log ===
1981 Playoff Game Log
1981 National League Eastern Division Series vs. Philadelphia Phillies – Montreal wins series 3–2

#	Date	Opponent	Score	Win	Loss	Save	Attendance	Series	Report
Game 1	October 7	Phillies	3–1	Rogers (1–0)	Carlton (0–1)	Reardon (1)	34,237	Expos lead 1–0	Boxscore
Game 2	October 8	Phillies	3–1	Gullickson (1–0)	Ruthven (0–1)	Reardon (2)	45,896	Expos lead 2–0	Boxscore
Game 3	October 9	@ Phillies	2–6	Christenson (1–0)	Burris (0–1)		36,835	Expos lead 2–1	Boxscore
Game 4	October 10	@ Phillies	5–6 (10 inn.)	McGraw (1–0)	Reardon (0–1)		38,818	Series tied 2–2	Boxscore
Game 5	October 11	@ Phillies	3–0	Rogers (2–0)	Carlton (0–2)		47,384	Expos win 3–2	Boxscore

1981 National League Championship Series vs. Los Angeles Dodgers – Los Angeles wins series 3–2

#	Date	Opponent	Score	Win	Loss	Save	Attendance	Series	Report
Game 1	October 13	@ Dodgers	1–5	Hooton (1–0)	Gullickson (0–1)		51,273	Dodgers lead 1–0	Boxscore
Game 2	October 14	@ Dodgers	3–0	Burris (1–0)	Valenzuela (0–1)		53,463	Series tied 1–1	Boxscore
Game 3	October 16	Dodgers	4–1	Rogers (1–0)	Reuss (0–1)		54,372	Expos lead 2–1	Boxscore
Game 4	October 17	Dodgers	1–7	Hooton (2–0)	Gullickson (0–2)		54,499	Series tied 2–2	Boxscore
	October 18	Dodgers	Postponed (rain); rescheduled for October 19						
Game 5	October 19	Dodgers	1–2	Valenzuela (1–1)	Rogers (1–1)	Welch (1)	36,491	Dodgers win 3–2	Boxscore

Legend
Expos win	Expos loss	Game postponed

== National League Division Series ==
=== Montreal Expos vs. Philadelphia Phillies ===
Montreal wins series, 3–2.

Game	Score	Date
1	Montreal 3, Philadelphia 1	October 7
2	Montreal 3, Philadelphia 1	October 8
3	Philadelphia 6, Montreal 2	October 9
4	Philadelphia 6, Montreal 5 (10 innings)	October 10
5	Montreal 3, Philadelphia 0	October 11

- October 11, 1981 – Steve Rogers defeats Steve Carlton of the Phillies 3–0 in a pitchers' duel to win the National League Division Series. Rogers drove in two of the three Expos runs to boot singling home Larry Parrish and Chris Speier in the fifth inning. The Expos advance to play the Dodgers who defeated the Astros. Rogers previously defeated Carlton in game one of the series as well.

== National League Championship Series ==
=== Game 1 ===
October 13, Dodger Stadium, Los Angeles

Team	1	2	3	4	5	6	7	8	9	R	H	E
Montreal	0	0	0	0	0	0	0	0	1	1	9	0
Los Angeles	0	2	0	0	0	0	0	3	X	5	8	0
WP: Burt Hooton (1-0) LP: Bill Gullickson (0-1); Home runs: MON: None; LAD: Pedro Guerrero (1), Mike Scioscia (1); Attendance: 51,273; Notes: Pitchers: MON – Gullickson, Reardon (8) LAD – Hooton, Welch (8), Howe (9)

=== Game 2 ===
October 14, Dodger Stadium, Los Angeles

Team	1	2	3	4	5	6	7	8	9	R	H	E
Montreal	0	2	0	0	0	1	0	0	0	3	10	1
Los Angeles	0	0	0	0	0	0	0	0	0	0	5	1
WP: Ray Burris (1-0) LP: Fernando Valenzuela (0-1); Home runs: MON: None; LAD: None; Attendance: 53,463; Notes: Pitchers: MON – Burris LAD – Valenzuela, Niedenfuer (7), Forster (7), Pena (7), Castillo (9)

=== Game 3 ===
October 16, Olympic Stadium, Montreal, Quebec

Team	1	2	3	4	5	6	7	8	9	R	H	E
Los Angeles	0	0	0	1	0	0	0	0	0	1	7	0
Montreal	0	0	0	0	0	4	0	0	X	4	7	1
WP: Steve Rogers (1-0) LP: Jerry Reuss (0-1); Home runs: LAD: None; MON: Jerry White (1); Attendance: 54,372; Notes: Pitchers: LAD – Reuss, Pena (8) MON – Rogers

=== Game 4 ===
October 17, Olympic Stadium, Montreal, Quebec

Team	1	2	3	4	5	6	7	8	9	R	H	E
Los Angeles	0	0	1	0	0	0	0	2	4	7	12	1
Montreal	0	0	0	1	0	0	0	0	0	1	5	1
WP: Burt Hooton (2-0) LP: Bill Gullickson (0-2); Home runs: LAD: Steve Garvey (1); MON: None; Attendance: Attendance: 54,499; Notes: Pitchers: LAD – Hooton, Welch (8), Howe (9) MON – Gullickson, Fryman (8), Sosa (9), Lee (9)

=== Game 5 ===
October 19, Olympic Stadium, Montreal, Quebec

Team	1	2	3	4	5	6	7	8	9	R	H	E
Los Angeles	0	0	0	0	1	0	0	0	1	2	6	0
Montreal	1	0	0	0	0	0	0	0	0	1	3	1
WP: Fernando Valenzuela (1-1) LP: Steve Rogers (1-1) Sv: Bob Welch (1); Home runs: LAD: Rick Monday (1); MON: None; Attendance: Attendance: 36,491; Notes: Pitchers: LAD – Valenzuela, Welch (9) MON – Burris, Rogers (9)

- October 19, 1981: Blue Monday. In the decisive Game 5 of their only National League Championship Series, the Expos were defeated at home, 2–1, by the Los Angeles Dodgers. Tim Raines opened the bottom of the first with a double against Cy Young Award-winning rookie sensation Fernando Valenzuela and scored on an Andre Dawson double play ball. Valenzuela held the Expos scoreless the rest of the way, however, and the Dodgers tied the game at 1 in the top of the fifth with two hits, a wild pitch and an RBI ground out off Expo starter Ray Burris. The teams remained tied until the top of the ninth, when Expo manager Jim Fanning made a risky decision to relieve Burris with Game 3 winner Steve Rogers. Struggling closer Jeff Reardon was throwing alongside Rogers in the bullpen at the time, but Fanning elected to summon his ace. Rogers retired Steve Garvey and Ron Cey in order, but outfielder Rick Monday homered to put Los Angeles ahead, 2–1, and crush the Expos' hopes of advancing to the World Series. Two-out walks from Gary Carter and Larry Parrish were all that the Expos could muster in the 9th, as Bob Welch preserved the one-run Dodger victory. The Expos lost the NLCS, 3–2, and never returned to the postseason again until 2012 as the Washington Nationals.

== Awards and honors ==
- Gary Carter, All-Star Game MVP
- Gary Carter, Gold Glove Award, Catcher
- Andre Dawson, Gold Glove Award, Outfield
- Charlie Lea, Pitcher of the Month Award, May
- Tim Raines, OF, The Sporting News Rookie of the Year Award
- Tim Raines, National League Leader, 71 Stolen Bases

== 52nd Major League Baseball All-Star Game ==
All-Star Game

- Gary Carter, National League catcher, starter
- Andre Dawson, National League outfield, starter
- Tim Raines, National League outfield, reserve
- Dick Williams, National League coach

== Farm system ==
Level	Team	League	Manager
AAA	Denver Bears	American Association	Felipe Alou
AA	Memphis Chicks	Southern League	Larry Bearnarth
A	West Palm Beach Expos	Florida State League	Bob Bailey
A-Short Season	Jamestown Expos	New York–Penn League	Pat Daugherty
Rookie	Calgary Expos	Pioneer League	J. R. Miner

LEAGUE CHAMPIONS: Denver
