= 1980 Montreal Expos season =

1980 Montreal Expos
- League: National League
- Division: East
- Ballpark: Olympic Stadium
- City: Montreal
- Record: 90–72 (.556)
- Divisional place: 2nd
- Owners: Charles Bronfman
- General managers: John McHale
- Managers: Dick Williams
- Television: CBC Television (Dave Van Horne, Duke Snider); Télévision de Radio-Canada (Jean-Pierre Roy, Guy Ferron)
- Radio: CFCF (English) (Dave Van Horne, Duke Snider); CKAC (French) (Claude Raymond, Jacques Doucet)

The 1980 Montreal Expos season was the 12th season in franchise history. The Expos were tied with the division rival Philadelphia Phillies in the standings entering the final weekend of the 1980 season with a three-game series set between the two clubs at Olympic Stadium. On October 4, with the Phillies holding a one-game lead in the standings, and with the score tied at four heading to the tenth, Mike Schmidt hit a blast deep into the seats in left field to give the Phillies a 6–4 lead and ultimate win to clinch the National League East. This was the Expos closest shot at making the postseason at the time in their brief 12-year history.

== Offseason ==
- December 7, 1979: Dan Schatzeder was traded by the Expos to the Detroit Tigers for Ron LeFlore.
- December 6, 1979: Rowland Office was signed as a free agent by the Expos.
- January 11, 1980: Mike Sharperson was drafted by the Expos in the 2nd round of the 1980 Major League Baseball draft (secondary phase), but did not sign.
- March 15, 1980: Duffy Dyer was traded by the Expos to the Detroit Tigers for Jerry Manuel.
- March 15, 1980: Joe Pettini was sent by the Expos to the San Francisco Giants to complete an earlier deal (John Tamargo was traded by the Giants to the Expos for a player to be named later and cash).
- March 18, 1980: Jim Mason was released by the Expos.
- March 31, 1980: Rusty Staub was traded by the Expos to the Texas Rangers for La Rue Washington and Chris Smith.

== Spring training ==
In 1980, the Expos held spring training at City Island Ball Park in Daytona Beach, Florida, for the final time. It was their eighth season there. For spring training the following season, they would return to West Palm Beach Municipal Stadium in West Palm Beach, Florida, where they previously had trained from 1969 through 1972.

== Regular season ==
On June 8, during a doubleheader against the St. Louis Cardinals, the Expos played against two different Cardinals managers: Ken Boyer, who was fired between games, and his replacement, Jack Krol.

=== Season standings ===
NL East
Team	W	L	Pct.	GB	Home	Road
Philadelphia Phillies	91	71	.562	—	49‍–‍32	42‍–‍39
Montreal Expos	90	72	.556	1	51‍–‍29	39‍–‍43
Pittsburgh Pirates	83	79	.512	8	47‍–‍34	36‍–‍45
St. Louis Cardinals	74	88	.457	17	41‍–‍40	33‍–‍48
New York Mets	67	95	.414	24	38‍–‍44	29‍–‍51
Chicago Cubs	64	98	.395	27	37‍–‍44	27‍–‍54

=== Record vs. opponents ===
1980 National League record Sources:
Team	ATL	CHC	CIN	HOU	LAD	MON	NYM	PHI	PIT	SD	SF	STL
Atlanta	—	8–4	2–16	7–11	11–7	5–7	3–9	5–7	11–1	12–6	11–6	6–6
Chicago	4–8	—	7–5	1–11	5–7	6–12	10–8	5–13	8–10	4–8	5–7	9–9
Cincinnati	16–2	5–7	—	8–10	9–9	3–9	8–4	7–5	6–6	15–3–1	7–11	5–7
Houston	11–7	11–1	10–8	—	9–10	5–7	8–4	3–9	7–5	11–7	11–7	7–5
Los Angeles	7–11	7–5	9–9	10–9	—	11–1	7–5	6–6	6–6	9–9	13–5	7–5
Montreal	7–5	12–6	9–3	7–5	1–11	—	10–8	9–9	6–12	10–2	7–5	12–6
New York	9–3	8–10	4–8	4–8	5–7	8–10	—	6–12	10–8	1–11	3–9	9–9
Philadelphia	7-5	13–5	5–7	9–3	6–6	9–9	12–6	—	7–11	8–4	6–6	9–9
Pittsburgh	1–11	10–8	6–6	5–7	6–6	12–6	8–10	11–7	—	6–6	8–4	10–8
San Diego	6–12	8–4	3–15–1	7–11	9–9	2–10	11–1	4–8	6–6	—	10–8	7–5
San Francisco	6–11	7–5	11–7	7–11	5–13	5–7	9–3	6–6	4–8	8–10	—	7–5
St. Louis	6–6	9–9	7–5	5–7	5–7	6–12	9–9	9–9	8–10	5–7	5–7	—

=== Opening Day starters ===
- Gary Carter
- Warren Cromartie
- Andre Dawson
- Ron LeFlore
- Larry Parrish
- Scott Sanderson
- Rodney Scott
- Chris Speier
- Ellis Valentine

=== Notable transactions ===
- June 3, 1980: 1980 Major League Baseball draft
  - Drafted Terry Francona in the 1st round (22nd pick).
  - Drafted Tom Gorman in the 4th round.
  - Drafted Roy Johnson in the 5th round.
  - Drafted Chris Sabo in the 30th round, but he did not sign.
- August 11, 1980: Acquired John D'Acquisto and cash from the San Diego Padres in exchange for a player to be named later. Randy Bass went to the Padres on September 5 to complete the deal.
- August 31, 1980: Traded Tony Phillips and cash to the San Diego Padres for Willie Montañez.

=== Roster ===
1980 Montreal Expos
Roster
Pitchers: 22 Stan Bahnsen; 42 John D'Acquisto; 28 Hal Dues; 35 Woodie Fryman; 48 Ross Grimsley; 34 Bill Gullickson; 53 Charlie Lea; 37 Bill Lee; 29 Dale Murray; 32 Fred Norman; 46 Dave Palmer; 47 Steve Ratzer; 45 Steve Rogers; 21 Scott Sanderson; 27 Elías Sosa	Catchers: 8 Gary Carter; 44 Bobby Ramos; 11 John Tamargo; Infielders: 6 Bill Almon; 7 Tony Bernazard; 49 Warren Cromartie; 14 Tommy Hutton; 31 Ken Macha; 43 Jerry Manuel; 54 Brad Mills; 5 Willie Montañez; 15 Larry Parrish; 30 Tim Raines; 3 Rodney Scott; 4 Chris Speier	Outfielders: 10 Andre Dawson; 7 Ron LeFlore; 25 Rowland Office; 24 Bob Pate; 17 Ellis Valentine; 58 Tim Wallach; 18 Jerry White	Manager: 23 Dick Williams; Coaches: 16 Felipe Alou (Assistant); 36 Galen Cisco (Pitching); 39 Pat Mullin (Hitting); 40 Norm Sherry (Bullpen); 9 Vern Rapp (First Base); 1 Ozzie Virgil (Third Base)

== Player stats ==
= Indicates team leader

= Indicates league leader

=== Batting ===
==== Starters by position ====
Note: Pos = Position; G = Games played; AB = At bats; R = Runs; H = Hits; Avg. = Batting average; HR = Home runs; RBI = Runs batted in; SB = Stolen bases

Pos	Player	G	AB	R	H	Avg.	HR	RBI	SB
C	Gary Carter	154	549	76	145	.264	29	101	3
1B	Warren Cromartie	162	597	74	172	.288	14	70	8
2B	Rodney Scott	154	567	84	127	.224	0	46	63
3B	Larry Parrish	126	452	55	115	.254	15	72	2
SS	Chris Speier	128	388	35	103	.265	1	32	0
LF	Ron LeFlore	139	521	95	134	.257	4	39	97
CF	Andre Dawson	151	577	96	178	.308	17	87	34
RF	Ellis Valentine	86	311	40	98	.315	13	67	5

==== Other batters ====
Note: G = Games played; AB = At bats; R = Runs; H = Hits; Avg. = Batting average; HR = Home runs; RBI = Runs batted in; SB = Stolen bases

Player	G	AB	R	H	Avg.	HR	RBI	SB
Rowland Office	116	292	36	78	.267	6	30	3
Jerry White	110	214	22	56	.262	7	23	8
Tony Bernazard	82	183	26	41	.224	5	18	9
Ken Macha	49	107	10	31	.290	1	8	0
Brad Mills	21	60	1	18	.300	0	8	0
Tommy Hutton	62	55	2	12	.218	0	5	0
John Tamargo	37	51	4	14	.275	1	13	0
Bob Pate	23	39	3	10	.256	0	5	0
Bill Almon	18	38	2	10	.263	0	3	0
Bobby Ramos	13	32	5	5	.156	0	2	0
Tim Raines	15	20	5	1	.050	0	0	5
Willie Montañez	14	19	1	4	.211	0	1	0
Tim Wallach	5	11	1	2	.182	1	2	0
Jerry Manuel	7	6	0	0	.000	0	0	0

=== Pitching ===
==== Starting pitchers ====
Note: G = Games pitched; IP = Innings pitched; W = Wins; L = Losses; ERA = Earned run average; SO = Strikeouts

Player	G	IP	W	L	ERA	SO
Steve Rogers	37	281.0	16	11	2.98	147
Scott Sanderson	33	211.1	16	11	3.11	125
Bill Gullickson	24	141.0	10	5	3.00	120
David Palmer	24	130.0	8	6	2.98	73
Bill Lee	24	118.0	4	6	4.96	34
Charlie Lea	21	104.0	7	5	3.72	56
Steve Ratzer	1	4.0	0	0	11.25	0

==== Other pitchers ====
Note: G = Games pitched; IP = Innings pitched; W = Wins; L = Losses; ERA = Earned run average; SO = Strikeouts

Player	G	IP	W	L	ERA	SO
Fred Norman	48	98.0	4	4	4.13	58
Ross Grimsley	11	41.1	2	4	6.31	11
Hal Dues	6	12.1	0	1	6.57	2

==== Relief pitchers ====
Note: G = Games pitched; IP = Innings pitched; W = Wins; L = Losses; SV = Saves; ERA = Earned run average; SO = Strikeouts

Player	G	IP	W	L	SV	ERA	SO
Woodie Fryman	61	80.0	7	4	17	2.25	59
Elías Sosa	67	94.0	9	6	9	3.06	58
Stan Bahnsen	57	91.1	7	6	4	3.05	48
Dale Murray	16	29.1	0	1	0	6.14	16
John D'Acquisto	11	20.2	0	2	2	2.18	15
Tommy Hutton	1	1.0	0	0	0	27.00	1

== Awards and honors ==
- Gary Carter, National League Gold Glove Award
- Andre Dawson, National League Gold Glove Award
- Ron LeFlore, National League Stolen Base Leader, 97

1980 Major League Baseball All-Star Game

- Gary Carter, reserve

== Farm system ==
Level	Team	League	Manager
AAA	Denver Bears	American Association	Billy Gardner
AA	Memphis Chicks	Southern League	Larry Bearnarth
A	West Palm Beach Expos	Florida State League	Bob Bailey
A-Short Season	Jamestown Expos	New York–Penn League	Pat Daugherty
Rookie	Calgary Expos	Pioneer League	Steve Boros
