= Steve Ratzer =

American baseball player (born 1953)

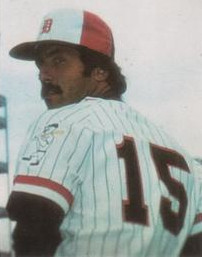
- Ratzer in 1978
- Pitcher
- Born: September 9, 1953 (age 73); Paterson, New Jersey
- Batted: Right Threw: Right

MLB debut
- October 5, 1980, for the Montreal Expos

Last MLB appearance
- May 17, 1981, for the Montreal Expos

MLB statistics
- Win–loss record: 1–1
- Earned run average: 7.17
- Strikeouts: 4
- Stats at Baseball Reference

Teams
- Montreal Expos (1980–1981)

Steven Wayne Ratzer (born September 9, 1953) is an American former Major League Baseball (MLB) player pitching for the Montreal Expos in 1980 and 1981.

== Early years ==
Ratzer was born in Paterson, New Jersey, and is Jewish. He attended John Bowne High School in Flushing, New York. In 1971, he pitched a no-hitter against George Washington High School to win the Public Schools Athletic League championship. He played college baseball at St. Johns University in Queens, New York.

He was signed as a minor league free agent by the Expos on June 11, 1975. He began playing immediately at the rookie league level, and by 1977 he had worked his way up to the Expos' AAA affiliate in the American Association, the Denver Bears, where he remained through the 1980 season.

== Montreal Expos ==
Ratzer made his Major League debut on the final day of the 1980 season as the starting pitcher when the Expos hosted the Philadelphia Phillies. In the bottom of the fourth inning, he was removed in favor a pinch hitter having surrendered five runs on nine hits. The Expos rallied, winning the game in 10 innings, leaving him with a no-decision in his debut.

In 1981, Ratzer appeared in 12 games, all in relief. On April 28 at the Philadelphia Phillies, he relieved starter Charlie Lea, pitching a three up, three down fifth inning. Because the starting pitcher did not pitch the requisite five innings to earn the victory, the official scorer awarded the win to Ratzer, which proved to be the only win of his major league career. On May 14 at the Los Angeles Dodgers, he relieved Bill Gullickson pitching another 1–2–3 eighth inning. However, he recorded his only loss when he surrendered a lead-off, walk-off home run to Pedro Guerrero in the next inning. Three days later Ratzer was sent back down to the minors.

== Post-MLB career ==
Ratzer finished the 1981 season with the Denver Bears. He was traded with cash to the New York Mets for Frank Taveras on December 11, 1981. He finished his professional career with the Tidewater Tides, the Mets' AAA affiliate in the International League in 1982, and back with the Bears, who were by then the Chicago White Sox AAA affiliate in 1983.

== Winter Leagues ==
In between, Ratzer played winter ball with the Águilas del Zulia and Tiburones de La Guaira clubs of the Venezuelan Professional Baseball League during three seasons spanning 1978–1982. He also pitched for the Dominican Republic's Leones del Escogido in the winter of 1981, and in Game 9 of the 1982 Caribbean Series.
