= Tim Raines Jr. =

American baseball player (born 1979)

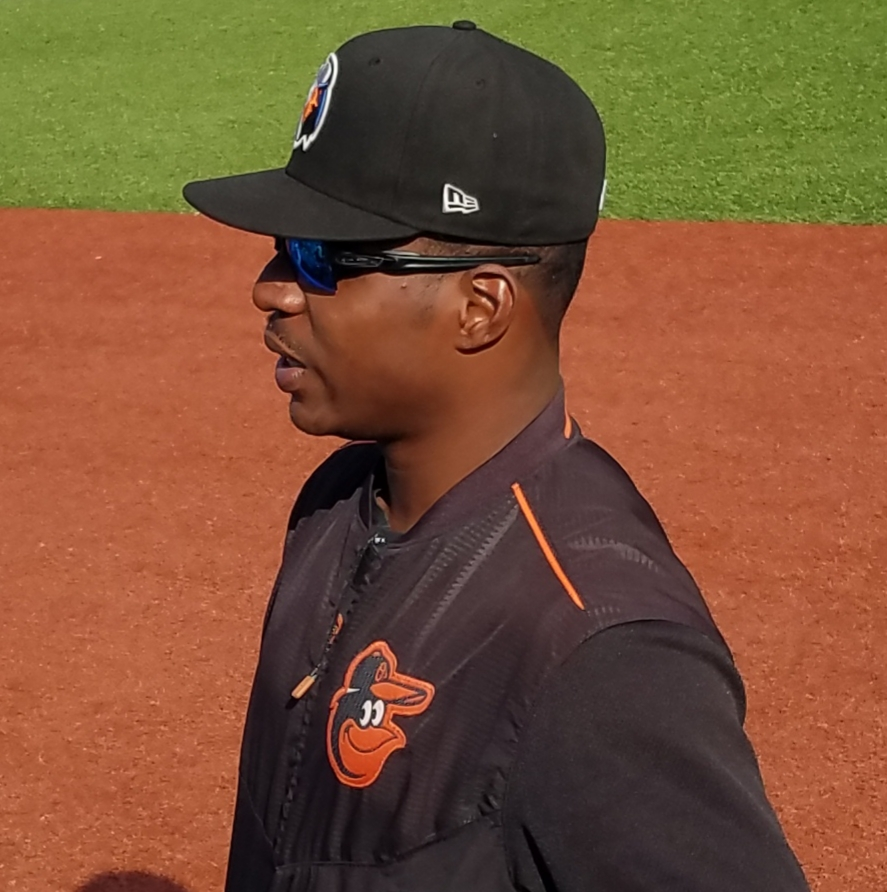
- Raines with the Aberdeen IronBirds in 2018
- Outfielder
- Born: August 31, 1979 (age 46); Memphis, Tennessee, U.S.
- Batted: Switch Threw: Right

MLB debut
- October 1, 2001, for the Baltimore Orioles

Last MLB appearance
- October 3, 2004, for the Baltimore Orioles

MLB statistics
- Batting average: .213
- Home runs: 0
- Runs batted in: 7
- Stats at Baseball Reference

Teams
- Baltimore Orioles (2001, 2003–2004)

Timothy Raines Jr. (born August 31, 1979) is an American former professional baseball outfielder. He is the son of Major League Baseball (MLB) Hall of Famer Tim Raines. Raines played for the Baltimore Orioles organization through 2005, playing for the Orioles in 2001 and 2003-2004. He played for the New Orleans Zephyrs and Harrisburg Senators in 2006. Like his father, Raines is a switch-hitter and throws right-handed.

In a three-season career, Raines is a .213 hitter with seven RBI and no home runs in 75 games.

On October 4, 2001, Raines Jr. played center field and his father, Tim Raines Sr., played left field, in an Orioles' 5–4 loss to the Boston Red Sox. They became the second major league father-son duo to play in the same game, matching the feat turned by Ken Griffey Sr. and Ken Griffey Jr. (with the Seattle Mariners, on August 31, 1990).

Raines signed with the Chicago White Sox on March 7, 2009, to a minor league contract. He then signed with the Kansas City Royals on May 29, 2009, to a minor league contract.

In 2011, Raines played for the Newark Bears of the Can-Am League, who were managed by his father.

In 2017, the Orioles named Raines the hitting coach for the Short-Season A affiliate Aberdeen IronBirds.

== See also ==
- List of second-generation Major League Baseball players
