= Rick Engle =

American baseball player (born 1957)

- Pitcher
- Born: April 7, 1957 (age 67); Corbin, Kentucky
- Batted: Right Threw: Left

MLB debut
- September 2, 1981, for the Montreal Expos

Last MLB appearance
- September 2, 1981, for the Montreal Expos

MLB statistics
- Win–loss record: 0–0
- Earned run average: 18.00
- Strikeouts: 2
- Stats at Baseball Reference

Teams
- Montreal Expos (1981)

Richard Douglas Engle (born April 7, 1957) is an American former Major League Baseball pitcher. He batted right and threw left-handed.

Engle graduated from Clermont Northeastern High School in Ohio in 1977 and then was signed by the Expos as an amateur free agent. He later said that his goal upon signing with the Expos was to make the majors by 1980. According to the scout who signed him, however, Engle was blocked from joining the team's MLB roster that year by the presence of left-handed pitcher Fred Norman, who the Expos had given a guaranteed contract.

Engle was not able to make his Major League debut until the following year against his hometown team, the Cincinnati Reds, on September 2, 1981. Despite a shaky start, Engle was able to strike out George Foster and Ray Knight to finish his outing.

On May 3, 1983, a day after taking the loss for the minor league Charlotte O's, Engle surprised the team by reporting to the clubhouse in civilian clothes before that day's game and telling them that he was retiring, had packed his bags and would be returning home to Batavia, Ohio.
