= Pat Rooney (baseball) =

American baseball player (born 1957)

- Right fielder
- Born: November 28, 1957 (age 67); Chicago, Illinois, U.S.
- Batted: Right Threw: Right

MLB debut
- September 9, 1981, for the Montreal Expos

Last MLB appearance
- October 4, 1981, for the Montreal Expos

MLB statistics
- Games: 4
- At bats: 5
- Hits: 0
- Stats at Baseball Reference

Teams
- Montreal Expos (1981)

Patrick Eugene Rooney (born November 28, 1957) is an American former Major League Baseball player. Rooney played for the Montreal Expos in 1981. He batted and threw right-handed.

== Career ==
He was drafted by the Expos in the 20th round of the 1978 amateur draft. He played his first season in Jamestown, New York in the Class-A New York–Penn League. He played Double-A ball in Memphis, and Triple-A ball in Denver.

Rooney became a Managing Partner of SFX Baseball Group. He is best known as the agent for Jim Thome, Larry Walker, Terry Francona and Charlie Manuel.
