= Tom Wieghaus =

American baseball player

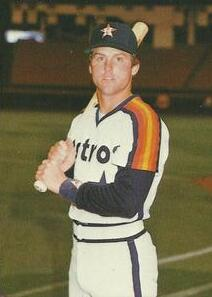
- Wieghaus with the Houston Astros c. 1984
- Catcher
- Born: February 1, 1957 (age 68); Chicago Heights, Illinois, U.S.
- Batted: Right Threw: Right

MLB debut
- October 4, 1981, for the Montreal Expos

Last MLB appearance
- May 2, 1984, for the Houston Astros

MLB statistics
- Batting average: .000
- Home runs: 0
- Runs batted in: 1
- Stats at Baseball Reference

Teams
- Montreal Expos (1981, 1983); Houston Astros (1984)

Thomas Robert Wieghaus (born February 1, 1957) is an American former catcher who played for the Montreal Expos and Houston Astros of Major League Baseball (MLB) in the 1980s.

== Career ==
Wieghaus attended Rich East High School in Park Forest, Illinois. He was drafted in the 12th round of the 1978 Amateur Draft out of Illinois State University. He played his first season of ball for Jamestown, New York of the New York-Penn League. He also played A ball in West Palm Beach, Double A ball in Memphis, and Triple A ball in Denver.

He was hitless in his 13 big-league at-bats. He did, however, get an official RBI. Weighaus was the Astros' catcher for starting pitcher Nolan Ryan on April 15, 1984, at the Astrodome, and hit a sacrifice fly to center field in the second inning to score teammate Enos Cabell.
