= Bill Gullickson =

American baseball player (born 1959)

- Pitcher
- Born: February 20, 1959 (age 67); Marshall, Minnesota, U.S.
- Batted: Right Threw: Right

Professional debut
- MLB: September 26, 1979, for the Montreal Expos
- NPB: April 9, 1988, for the Yomiuri Giants

Last appearance
- NPB: August 13, 1989, for the Yomiuri Giants
- MLB: August 7, 1994, for the Detroit Tigers

MLB statistics
- Win–loss record: 162–136
- Earned run average: 3.93
- Strikeouts: 1,279

NPB statistics
- Win–loss record: 21–14
- Earned run average: 3.29
- Strikeouts: 231
- Stats at Baseball Reference

Teams
- Montreal Expos (1979–1985); Cincinnati Reds (1986–1987); New York Yankees (1987); Yomiuri Giants (1988–1989); Houston Astros (1990); Detroit Tigers (1991–1994)

Career highlights and awards
- AL wins leader (1991); Montreal Expos Hall of Fame

William Lee Gullickson (born February 20, 1959) is an American former Major League Baseball pitcher who played professionally in Canada, the U.S. and Japan, during an 18-year professional career, of which 14 seasons were spent in MLB.

== MLB career (1979–1987) ==
=== Minor Leagues ===
Gullickson was selected as the second player to be drafted in the first round of the June 1977 Major League Baseball draft, by the Montreal Expos, out of Joliet Catholic Academy in Joliet, Illinois.

=== Montreal Expos ===
He finished second behind Steve Howe in the National League Rookie of the Year voting in 1980, after a season in which he went 10–5 with an earned run average (ERA) of 3.00, and set a major-league record for most strikeouts in a game by a rookie, with 18. Gullickson held that record for 18 years, until Kerry Wood broke it with 20 strikeouts in 1998. Gullickson held the Montreal Expos-Washington Nationals all-time strikeout record for a single game with 18 strikeouts until Max Scherzer broke the record in 2016.

In 1981, he helped the Expos to their only division title with a 7–9, 2.81 record. The Expos lost the National League Championship Series to the Los Angeles Dodgers in five games. Except for the 1981 strike season, Gullickson was in double figures in wins for every year onward.

=== Cincinnati Reds ===
On December 12, 1985, Gullickson was acquired by the Reds, along with catcher Sal Butera; the Reds sent pitchers Andy McGaffigan and John Stuper and catcher Dann Bilardello to the Expos. Gullickson was 15-12 for the Reds with an ERA of 3.38 Gullickson was 10-11 when he was traded mid-season to the New York Yankees in 1987 .

=== New York Yankees ===
On August 26, 1987, Gullickson was acquired by the New York Yankees for their 1987 pennant drive, in exchange for Dennis Rasmussen. Gullickson recorded 4 wins and 2 losses with the Yankees but was unhappy there. Tommy John thought the intense media coverage and high expectations of the New York fans proved difficult for Gullickson to adjust to. In 1988, he accepted a $2 million offer to pitch in Japan for the Yomiuri Giants after being granted free agency on November 9, 1987.

== NPB career (1988–1989) ==
Gullickson stayed with the Giants for two seasons, with a record of 21–14. Kazushige Nagashima, the son of Japanese baseball legend Shigeo Nagashima, got the first hit in his professional career, a home run, off Gullickson. When asked about his time in Japan, Gullickson said it was strange; the only English words that he saw were "Sony and Mitsubishi."

=== Overcomes diabetes to excel ===
Although only in Japan for a short time, Gullickson left behind a positive legacy. When he was in Japan, it was considered a miracle that Gullickson, a patient with type 1 diabetes mellitus, played a professional sport. Since 1998, the Japan Diabetes Mellitus Society (JADMC) has awarded the "Gullickson Award" for the patient who is deemed a superior influence on society.

While in Japan, Gullickson also developed a close friendship with a young Japanese pitcher, Masumi Kuwata, and even named his son "Craig Kuwata Gullickson" in his honor. Kuwata learned many things from Gullickson and grew to be one of the best players in Japan. Meanwhile, Kuwata had always wished to play in MLB, and at last, this dream was realized in 2007, as he became a member of the Pittsburgh Pirates. Nearly 20 years after meeting Gullickson, Kuwata became an MLB rookie, at the age of 39.

At the age of 12, Sam Fuld, an aspiring baseball player who also had diabetes, met Gullickson, and talked to him for two minutes. "That was enough to inspire me", Fuld said. "Any time I can talk to young diabetic kids, I look forward to that opportunity", said Gullickson. Fuld went on to play eight seasons in the Major Leagues.

== Back to MLB (1990–1994) ==
=== Houston Astros ===
Gullickson signed as a free agent with the Houston Astros after the 1989 season, and had a mediocre 1990 season (10–14, 3.82 ERA) before being released.

=== Detroit Tigers ===
Late in 1990, Gullickson signed a multimillion-dollar contract with the Detroit Tigers, for whom he pitched for four seasons. While with the Tigers he met a young boy, who was then 12, who also had diabetes, and talked to him for two minutes. It was future major-leaguer Sam Fuld, who battled to make the Cubs' 2008 team. "That was enough to inspire me", Fuld said. "Any time I can talk to young diabetic kids, I look forward to that opportunity."

In 1991, Gullickson had a career-high 20 wins against 9 losses, tying Scott Erickson for the American League lead in wins and placing eighth in the AL Cy Young Award voting. The Tigers would not have another 20-game winner until Justin Verlander in 2011. Gullickson tallied another 14 wins in 1992, and had 13 wins in 1993. In 1994, the 35-year old Gullickson was forced to retire due to injuries after posting a 4–5 record and 5.93 ERA in 19 starts.

== Family ==
Gullickson is married to Sandy Gullickson. Their six children are all involved in sports or other physically intensive endeavors:

- Cassie Gullickson was on the track and field team at the University of Notre Dame.
- Carly Gullickson was a professional tennis player, whose highest world ranking in singles was no. 123 and in doubles no. 52. She won the US Open Mixed Doubles in 2009. She is retired and is a stay-at-home mom.
- Chelsey Gullickson won the 2010 NCAA Division I women's singles tennis championship for the University of Georgia.
- Craig Gullickson was a standout pitcher at Cardinal Newman High School, where he was one of the best pitchers in the state of Florida. He received a scholarship to play for Clemson University after his performance in the High School All Star Game.
- Callie Gullickson is a strength instructor at Peloton. She is a former dancer and model. She attended Pace University in New York City.
- Chloe Gullickson is a tennis player and was no. 2 in Florida and highly nationally ranked. She received a full scholarship to the University of Virginia.

== See also ==
- List of Major League Baseball annual wins leaders
- List of Major League Baseball single-game strikeout leaders
