= Steve Rogers (baseball) =

American baseball player

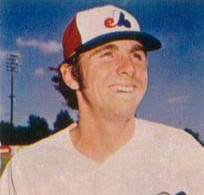
- Pitcher
- Born: October 26, 1949 (age 76); Jefferson City, Missouri, U.S.
- Batted: Right Threw: Right

MLB debut
- July 18, 1973, for the Montreal Expos

Last MLB appearance
- May 19, 1985, for the Montreal Expos

MLB statistics
- Win–loss record: 158–152
- Earned run average: 3.17
- Strikeouts: 1,621
- Stats at Baseball Reference

Teams
- Montreal Expos (1973–1985)

Career highlights and awards
- 5× All-Star (1974, 1978, 1979, 1982, 1983); MLB ERA leader (1982); Montreal Expos Hall of Fame

Member of the Canadian

Baseball Hall of Fame
- Induction: 2005
Medals
Representing United States
Amateur World Series
Silver medal – second place	1969 Santo Domingo	Team
International Amateur Tournament
Gold medal – first place	1968 Mexico City	Team

Stephen Douglas Rogers (born October 26, 1949) is an American former professional baseball starting pitcher. He played in Major League Baseball (MLB) for the Montreal Expos from 1973 to 1985. Rogers led MLB in earned run average in 1982 and was a five-time MLB All-Star. Rogers is also notable for being the only player with at least a ten-year career to spend his entire career with the Expos.

== Early life ==
Rogers was born in Jefferson City, Missouri, to dentist Doug Rogers and his wife Connie, and raised in Springfield. He pitched for his high school team in junior year and senior year, pitching them to the state championship tournament semifinals in the latter year. Rogers was scouted by Tom Greenwade of the New York Yankees, who drafted him in the 67th round of the 1967 draft. However, Rogers's father told the scout that his son was not ready, which led to Greenwade recommending Rogers to Gene Shell, coach of the University of Tulsa. During Rogers's sophomore year, the team made it to the College World Series title game, losing 10–1 to Arizona State. Rogers was named to the all-tournament team at the 1971 College World Series. While at the University of Tulsa he was a member of Kappa Sigma fraternity. Rogers graduated with a degree in petroleum engineering.

== Major League career ==
The Montreal Expos selected Rogers in the first round, with the fourth overall selection, of the 1971 MLB draft. Rogers made his debut on July 18, 1973, against the Houston Astros at the Astrodome. He threw eight innings while allowing two runs on four hits, with three walks and two strikeouts. Although Rogers received a no decision, the Expos prevailed 3–2 in the tenth inning. Eight days later, he received his first career win at Veterans Stadium, against the Philadelphia Phillies, pitching a one-hitter while striking out three and walking one in the 4–0 win. That year, Rogers went 10–5 with a 1.54 ERA in 17 games and 134 innings of work, having seven complete games, 64 strikeouts and 49 walks. He finished 2nd in the National League Major League Baseball Rookie of the Year Award voting that year to Gary Matthews. Alongside Matthews, he was awarded the Sporting News Rookie of the Year Award for that season.

For 1974, Rogers had an up-and-down year. He started the season well, winning his first three starts and going 7–2 at one point, but he subsequently lost his next six games, with his ERA rising above four by the time May was over. By the time of his last start before the All-Star Game on July 23, he was 10–11. Despite this, he was named to the All-Star Game at Three Rivers Stadium, although he did not pitch. Rogers lost six consecutive decisions midway through August. He finished 15–22 with a 4.47 ERA in 38 games and 253 2/3 innings of work. Rogers had 11 complete games while allowing 126 earned runs (a career high), with 154 strikeouts and 80 walks. He faced over a thousand batters (with 1,064) for the first time in his career. Still, manager Gene Mauch was frustrated by Rogers's failure to repeat his success of the previous year.

The following year, Rogers went 11–12 with a 3.29 ERA in 35 games and 251 2/3 innings of work. He had 12 complete games with 137 strikeouts and 88 walks. Rogers finished in the top ten of numerous categories, such as innings pitched (ninth), games started (tenth), complete games (eighth), hits (sixth), home runs per nine innings (seventh with 0.465), batters faced (sixth), and errors by a pitcher (first, with seven).

For 1976, Rogers was selected to start the Opening Day game for the Expos, facing the New York Mets at Shea Stadium. In six innings of work, he allowed three runs (two earned) on four hits, with six strikeouts and three walks, taking the loss as the Expos lost 3–2. For the season, he went 7–17 with a 3.21 ERA in 33 games and 230 innings of work, with one save. Rogers finished with 150 strikeouts and 69 walks. The season was a turbulent one for the Expos, as they went 55–107, the only time that Rogers was on a 100–loss team.

Although he never won 20 games, Rogers averaged 14 wins per season between 1974 and 1985. He made nine Opening Day starts for the Expos, eight of them consecutively from 1976 to 1983.

The 1977 season brought changes for Rogers and the team. At the helm as manager for the Expos was Dick Williams, who had led the Oakland Athletics to back-to-back World Series championships earlier in the decade. However, Williams was not a fan of Rogers. In his book No More Mister Nice Guy, he accused Rogers of being unwilling to step up when his team needed him in big games once the Expos became contenders. According to Williams, Rogers was at his best when the Expos were bad because he had no pressure. Williams called Rogers "a fraud", claiming that he had "king of the mountain syndrome". Rogers made his second consecutive Opening Day start on April 9, 1977, against the Philadelphia Phillies. He pitched four innings while allowing three runs on five hits, receiving a no decision as the Expos prevailed to win 4–3. Rogers went 17–16 with a 3.10 ERA in 40 games and 301 2/3 innings of work, the latter two being career highs. He also had 17 complete games while having 206 strikeouts and 81 walks, the former two being career highs. He faced 1,235 batters, the most in his career for a season.

The following year, Rogers went 13–10 with a 2.47 ERA. In 30 games, he had 11 complete games with a shutout and a save in 219 innings. He had 126 strikeouts and 64 walks. He was named to the All-Star Game in San Diego. Rogers pitched the fourth and fifth inning for the National League, allowing no runs on two hits. On May 5, he gave up Pete Rose's 3,000th career hit.

Rogers had another excellent 1979 season. He went 13–12 with a 3.00 ERA in 37 games, having 13 complete games while reaching a career high five shutouts. He threw 248 2/3 innings of work while having 143 strikeouts and 78 walks.

The following year, he improved to a 16–11 season with a 2.98 ERA. In 37 games, he had 14 complete games while throwing 281 innings with 147 strikeouts and 85 walks. Although he did not receive an All-Star Game nod, he finished fifth in the Cy Young Award race to Steve Carlton.

1981 marked a change for the Expos and Rogers. A strike occurred in June that lasted until August, causing the season to be split into two halves, which meant the winners of each half for the respective division would face off against each other. Rogers went 12–8 with a 3.42 ERA in 22 games and 160 2/3 innings of work. He had 87 strikeouts and 41 walks. The alienation by manager Williams of players such as Rogers and closer Jeff Reardon led to his firing on September 7, 27 games before the second half ended, replaced by Jim Fanning. The Expos went 16–11 down the stretch to win the second half and clinch a playoff spot. In his final five games of the season (all under management by Fanning), Rogers went 3–2 while throwing two complete games. Rogers was tasked to start the opening game of the National League Division Series against the Philadelphia Phillies and ace Steve Carlton at Olympic Stadium. In the first postseason game in Canada on October 7, Rogers threw 8 2/3 innings while allowing one run on ten hits as the Expos triumphed 3–1. He was sent to the mound for Game 5 four days later at Veterans Stadium in Philadelphia to try and give Montreal a postseason series win. He threw a complete game while allowing six hits and no runs as the Expos broke through in the fifth inning. On the mound against Carlton, he lined a single into center field, scoring Larry Parrish and Chris Speier that proved to be the winning hit as the Expos won 3–0. He started Game 3 of the National League Championship Series on October 16, facing off against Jerry Reuss in Montreal. Rogers allowed one run on seven hits in a complete game as the Expos prevailed 4–1. In Game 5 on the 19th, he was sent in relief to preserve a 1–1 tie in the ninth inning in relief of Ray Burris. He retired Steve Garvey and Ron Cey before facing Rick Monday. On a 3–1 count, Monday hit a home run that gave the Dodgers the lead. The Expos could not get a run in the bottom of the inning as the Dodgers won the series and the National League pennant 2–1. The decision of manager Jim Fanning to use Rogers in that game, on only two days' rest, is still debated by Montreal fans. In his four postseason games, Rogers was 3–1 with a 0.97 ERA and two complete games.

The following year proved most productive. Rogers made his seventh Opening Day start that year, against the Phillies on April 9 on the road. He threw a complete game while allowing no runs on three hits, with two walks and ten strikeouts, defeating Larry Christenson for his first career Opening Day victory. He went 19–8, having a career-high in wins. He pitched four shutouts, and led all National League pitchers with a 2.40 ERA while having 179 strikeouts and 65 walks. Rogers was named to the All-Star Game for the fourth time, this time held in Montreal's Olympic Stadium. Rogers pitched the opening three innings in front of his home crowd, allowing one run on four hits with two strikeouts. He received the win as the National League struck early to win 4–1.

In 1983, Rogers made his eighth consecutive Opening Day start for the Expos. Facing the Chicago Cubs at Wrigley Field, he allowed no runs on six hits while having a walk and six strikeouts. He led the National League in shutouts that year with five, matching his career high, and was named to the All-Star Game for the fifth and final time, although he did not play in the game.

His late career was hampered by injuries. 1984 was his last full season. He was not the Opening Day starter, with that honor going to Charlie Lea. He went 6–15 with a 4.31 ERA, appearing in 31 games with 169 1/3 innings pitched. He had one complete game, the lowest amount in his career. He had 64 strikeouts and 78 walks, the first time that he had more walks than strikeouts. He had three errors on fielding, which was more than his last three seasons combined. He was 5th in the league in losses and 2nd in the league with wild pitches at 12.

Rogers made the Opening Day start for the Expos, his ninth and final occasion, against the Cincinnati Reds at Riverfront Stadium. Facing Mario Soto on April 8, he allowed three runs on eight hits, striking out three and walking one as the Reds prevailed 4–1. In nine Opening Day starts, he went 2–4 with three no decisions. His final appearance in the majors was on May 19, 1985, against the San Diego Padres at Olympic Stadium. In 4 2/3 innings of work, he allowed six runs on eleven hits while walking two and striking out one in the 8–3 loss. He finished with a 2–4 record and a 5.68 ERA in eight games and 38 innings of work. He had 18 strikeouts and 20 walks. He was released by the team two days later. He later signed with the California Angels and Chicago White Sox but did not pitch for either team. His last outing was for the Edmonton Trappers, California's Triple A team in the Pacific Coast League.

In a 13-year career, Rogers posted a 158–152 record with a 3.17 ERA and 1621 strikeouts in 2837 2/3 innings. He pitched 129 complete games with 37 shutouts in 399 appearances, 393 as a starter. As of the end of the 2017 season, Rogers is one of 180 players to have played his entire career with one team and played for ten seasons or more, including the only one to do it with the Expos. Rogers was first eligible to be elected to the National Baseball Hall of Fame on the 1991 ballot, but received no votes and fell off.

== Post-playing career ==
Rogers now resides in Princeton Junction, New Jersey, and works for the Major League Baseball Players Association.

== See also ==
- List of Major League Baseball annual ERA leaders
- List of Major League Baseball players who spent their entire career with one franchise
