= Chris Smith (first baseman) =

American baseball player (born 1957)

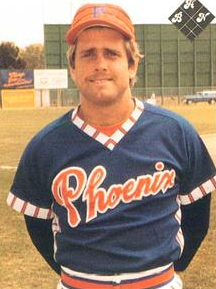
- Smith with the Phoenix Giants c. 1983
- First baseman / Outfielder
- Born: July 18, 1957 (age 68); Torrance, California, U.S.
- Batted: Switch Threw: Right

Professional debut
- MLB: May 14, 1981, for the Montreal Expos
- NPB: April 6, 1984, for the Yakult Swallows

Last appearance
- MLB: October 2, 1983, for the San Francisco Giants
- NPB: May 5, 1985, for the Yakult Swallows

MLB statistics
- Batting average: .289
- Home runs: 1
- Runs batted in: 11

NPB statistics
- Batting average: .202
- Home runs: 5
- Runs batted in: 18
- Stats at Baseball Reference

Teams
- Montreal Expos (1981–1982); San Francisco Giants (1983); Yakult Swallows (1984–1985)

Christopher William Smith (born July 18, 1957) is an American former professional baseball player. He played as a first baseman and left fielder in Major League Baseball and Nippon Professional Baseball.

== Career ==
Smith attended the University of Southern California from 1976 to 1978. He was a starting member on the varsity baseball team since his freshman year where he hit third in the lineup all three years. He was selected to play for the USA team against the Japan in 1977 and 1978, where he met some very special friends from the Japanese national team, Tatsunori Hara and his close friend Suguru Egawa, which Christopher roomed with at USC in 1978, where the Trojans won the national title in Omaha, Nebraska.

After touring Japan with the USA All Stars in 1978, Christopher signed a professional contract with the Texas Rangers. In his first year professionally, he hit .331, third highest in the Texas League. He was traded to the Montreal Expos the next year for Rusty Staub where he hit .327 in the International league, Wichita Aeros, AAA affiliate of the Montreal Expos. The next year he was traded to the San Francisco Giants for Jim Wohlford, where he played in the Pacific Coast League AAA affiliate of the Giants winning the batting title hitting .378 in 1983. He proceeded to play in the Major Leagues with the Montreal Expos in 1981 and 1982, and San Francisco Giants where in 1983, he finished the year hitting .328. One of his highlights in the major leagues, was at Riverfront Stadium in Cincinnati, where he hit a three-run home run to beat the Cincinnati Reds in the top of the ninth inning going 2-for-5 for the day.

After his career in the MLB, he signed at the time, the most lucrative three-year contract ever, with the Yakult Swallows of the Nippon Professional Baseball (NPB). His only regret was not signing with the Yomiuri Giants, who at the time, offered him two years, instead of three. In two seasons with the Swallows, he played in 68 total games, having 36 hits with five home runs and 18 RBIs for a .202 batting average.

== Personal life ==
Smith has lived in Japan since 1995 where he considers his home after meeting a former model and TV broadcaster whom he married in 2003. They have twins, one boy and one girl.
