= Bob Pate =

American baseball player (born 1953)

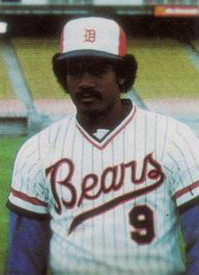
- Pate in 1978
- Right fielder / Pinch hitter
- Born: December 3, 1953 (age 72); Los Angeles, California
- Batted: Right Threw: Right

MLB debut
- June 2, 1980, for the Montreal Expos

Last MLB appearance
- June 10, 1981, for the Montreal Expos

MLB statistics
- Batting average: .267
- Home runs: 0
- Runs batted in: 5
- Stats at Baseball Reference

Teams
- Montreal Expos (1980–1981)

Robert Wayne Pate (born December 3, 1953) is a former outfielder in Major League Baseball who played in 1980 and 1981 with the Montreal Expos. Listed at 6' 3", 200 lb., he batted and threw right handed.

== Career ==
Born in Los Angeles, California, Pate attended Arizona State University and Mesa Community College. He was selected by the Montreal Exposs in the fourth round of the 1976 MLB draft.

Pate split his first three professional seasons between the Quebec Metros and Denver Bears before joining the big team.

His most productive season came in 1979, when he hit a slash line of .323/.383/.485 in 118 games with Denver, ending second in the Triple-A American Association batting race behind Keith Smith (.350), of the Springfield Redbirds, while ranking second in hits (157), ninth in total bases (220) and tenth in runs scored (85).

In part of two seasons with Montreal, Pate posted a .267 average with five runs batted in without a home run in 31 games.

Overall, Pate slashed .301/.380/.458 with 67 homers and 398 RBI in 693 minor league games from 1977–1983. In between, he played winter ball with the Cardenales de Lara club of the Venezuelan League during the 1979–1980 season.

Following his playing career, Pate coached for the Burlington Expos in 1987.
