= Tim Raines =

American baseball player (born 1959)

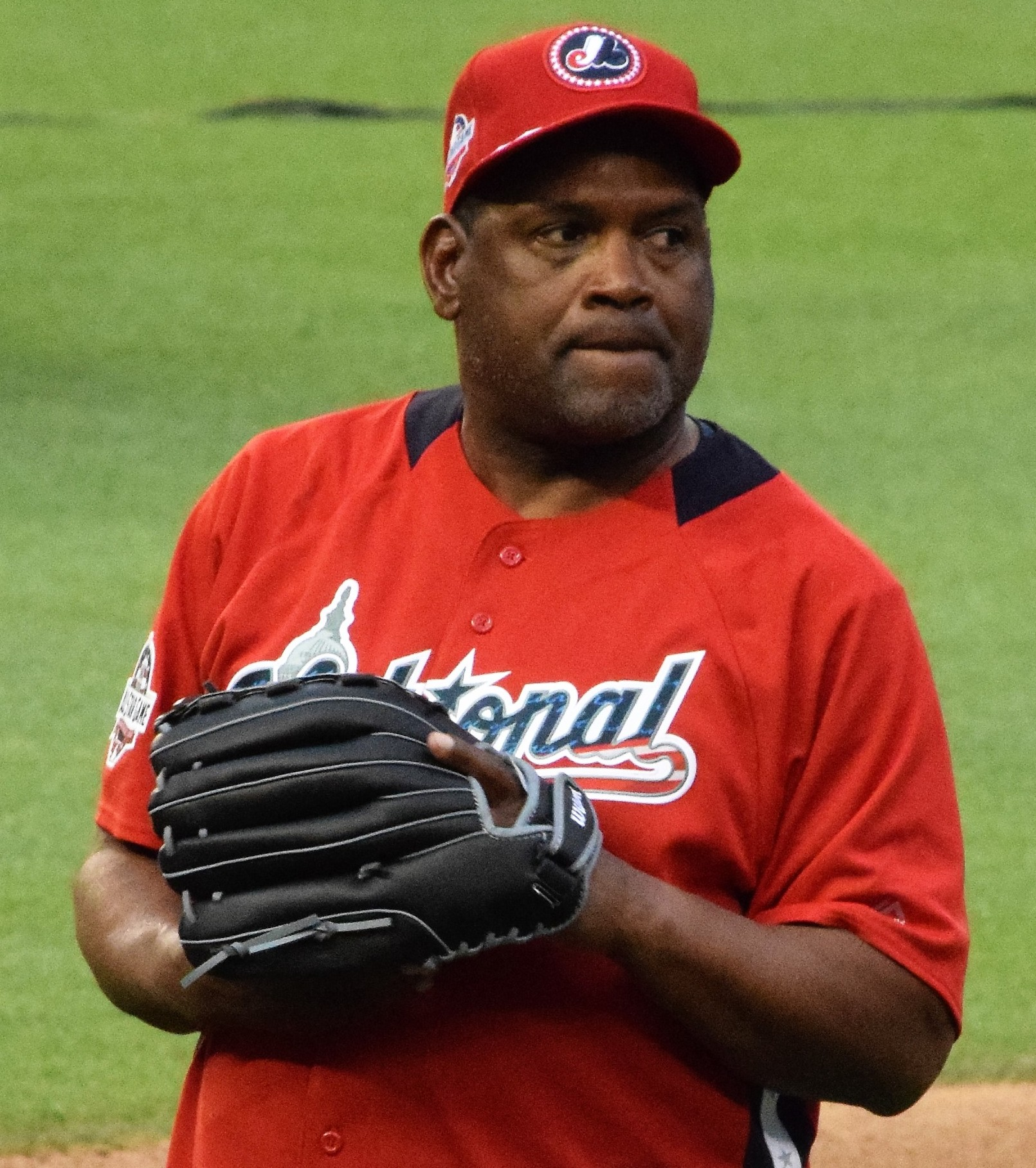
- Raines in 2018
- Left fielder
- Born: September 16, 1959 (age 67); Sanford, Florida, U.S.
- Batted: Switch Threw: Right

MLB debut
- September 11, 1979, for the Montreal Expos

Last MLB appearance
- September 29, 2002, for the Florida Marlins

MLB statistics
- Batting average: .294
- Hits: 2,605
- Home runs: 170
- Runs batted in: 980
- Stolen bases: 808
- Stats at Baseball Reference

Teams
- As player: Montreal Expos (1979–1990); Chicago White Sox (1991–1995); New York Yankees (1996–1998); Oakland Athletics (1999); Montreal Expos (2001); Baltimore Orioles (2001); Florida Marlins (2002); As coach: Chicago White Sox (2005–2006)

Career highlights and awards
- 7× All-Star (1981–1987); 3× World Series champion (1996, 1998, 2005); Silver Slugger Award (1986); NL batting champion (1986); 4× NL stolen base leader (1981–1984); Montreal Expos No. 30 retired; Montreal Expos Hall of Fame; Washington Nationals Ring of Honor

Member of the National

Baseball Hall of Fame
- Induction: 2017
- Vote: 86.0% (tenth ballot)

Timothy Raines Sr. (born September 16, 1959), nicknamed "Rock", is an American professional baseball coach and former player. He played as a left fielder in Major League Baseball for six teams from 1979 to 2002 and was best known for his 13 seasons with the Montreal Expos. A seven-time All-Star, four-time stolen base champion, and National League batting champion, Raines is regarded as one of the best leadoff hitters and baserunners in baseball history. In 2013, Raines began working in the Toronto Blue Jays organization as a roving outfield and baserunning instructor. In 2017, Raines was inducted into the Baseball Hall of Fame.

== Early life ==
Raines was born on September 16, 1959, in Sanford, Florida, to Ned and Florence Raines. He attended Seminole High School in Sanford. Raines was one of seven children. Two of his brothers, Levi and Ned III, played minor league baseball. As a baseball player at Seminole, Raines stole home plate ten times. He also rushed for 1,000 yards in eight football games and set two school track and field records that lasted for several years. Raines reportedly received over 100 scholarship offers to play college football.

Discussing his decision to play professional baseball instead of football he stated, "...in football I was a running back, so in the NFL my career would have probably lasted six or seven years and in baseball I ended up playing 23 years. In baseball you can play a long time so I think it's better when you think of it in that way."

== Career ==
=== Montreal Expos ===
The Montreal Expos selected Raines in the fifth round of the 1977 Major League Baseball draft. After debuting with six games as a pinch runner in 1979, he played briefly as a second baseman for the Expos in 1980 but soon switched to playing the outfield, and rapidly became a fan favorite due to his aggressiveness on the basepaths. In his strike-interrupted 1981 rookie season, he batted .304 and set a then Major League Baseball rookie record with 71 stolen bases, (Note: Broken by Juan Samuel with 72 in 1984) breaking the previous mark of 56 steals set by Gene Richards in 1977. Raines was caught stealing for the first time in 1981, after having begun his career with a then major league record 27 consecutive successful stolen bases. Raines was the runner-up for the National League's Rookie of the Year Award in 1981, which was won by Los Angeles Dodgers pitcher Fernando Valenzuela.

Raines' performance dipped in 1982, as he hit .277 with a .353 on-base percentage. At the end of the season, Raines entered treatment for substance abuse, having spent an estimated $40,000 that year on cocaine. To avoid leaving the drug in his locker, Raines carried it in his hip pocket, and slid headfirst when running the bases. He used cocaine before games, in his car, after games, and on some occasions between innings in the clubhouse. Raines would later testify at the Pittsburgh drug trials in September 1985.

In 1983, Raines stole a career high of 90 bases, the second-highest total in franchise history, and scored 133 runs, a franchise record. He was named Expos Player of the Year in 1983, 1985, and 1986. In each season from 1981 to 1986, Raines stole at least 70 bases. He had a career-high .334 batting average in 1986, winning the National League Batting Championship. Raines maintained a consistently high on-base percentage during this period and a rising slugging percentage, reaching a career peak of .429 in 1987. Although he never won a Gold Glove Award, Raines was an excellent defensive player who led the National League with 21 assists in 1983 and, with 4 double plays, tied for the league lead in double plays by an outfielder in 1985.

Raines became a free agent on November 12, 1986, but in spite of his league-leading play no team made a serious attempt to sign him (in a period when Major League Baseball owners colluded to keep salaries down). On May 1, 1987, hours after being permitted to negotiate again with Montreal, Raines signed a new deal with the Expos for $5 million over three years and a $900,000 signing bonus. In his first game back, on May 2, facing the Mets, although Raines had not participated in spring training or any other competitive preparation for the season, he hit the first pitch he saw off the right-field wall for a triple. Raines finished the game with four hits in five at-bats, three runs, one walk, a stolen base, and a game-winning grand slam in the 10th inning. Even without having played in April, Raines led the Expos in runs, walks, times on base, runs created, and stolen bases, in addition to batting average, on-base percentage, and slugging percentage. He also garnered MVP honors in the All-Star Game as he delivered a game-winning triple in the 13th inning. Raines would, in 1992, be one of dozens of players retroactively awarded collusion damages, receiving over $865,000.

=== Post-Expos career ===
The Expos traded Raines to the Chicago White Sox on December 20, 1990, along with Jeff Carter and a player to be named later (PTBNL), later identified as Mario Brito, in exchange for Iván Calderón and Barry Jones. Raines later admitted he left Montreal because he wanted to win a World Series and did not believe the Expos "had what it took".

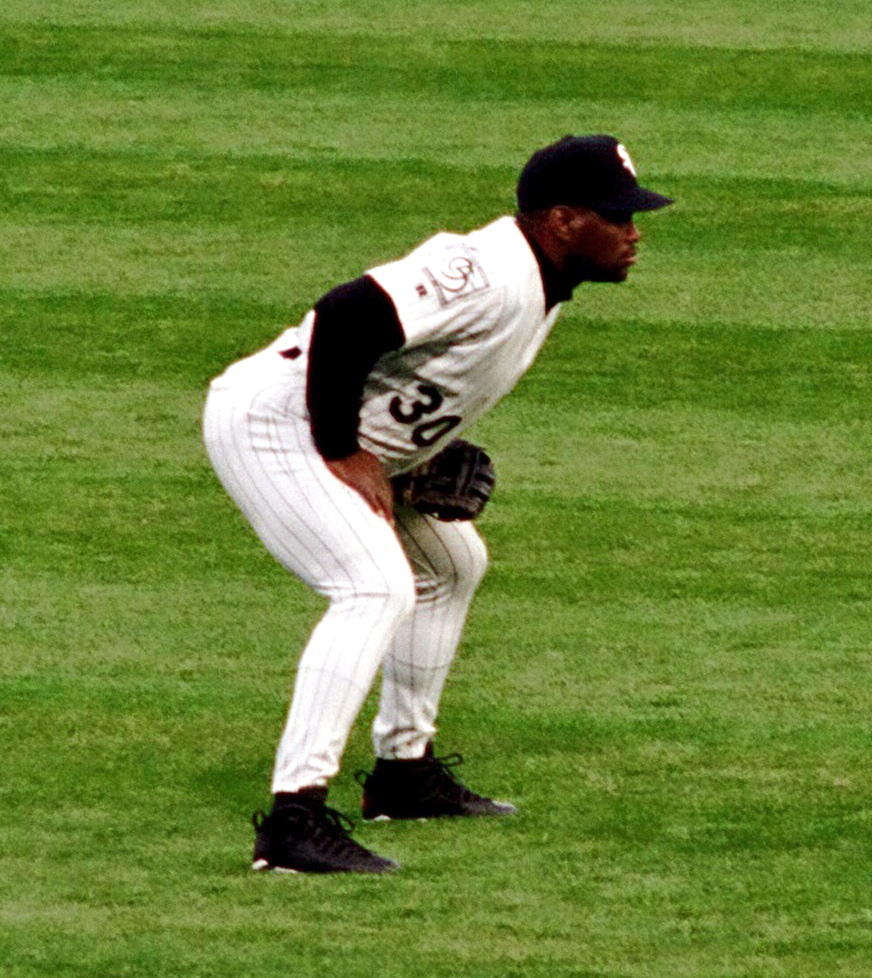
Raines playing for the Chicago White Sox, 1995

In his first season in the American League, Raines hit for a .268 average but with a .359 on-base percentage; he was second on the team in runs scored as the White Sox finished the season in second place in the American League Western Division. His average improved in 1992 to .294 with a .380 on-base percentage. In 1993, despite missing nearly six weeks in April and May due to a torn ligament in his thumb he sustained while stealing a base, he managed to hit .306 with 16 home runs as the White Sox won the American League Western Division title. In the 1993 American League Championship Series against the Toronto Blue Jays, Raines posted a .444 batting average and scored five runs in a losing cause.

On December 28, 1995, the White Sox traded Raines to the New York Yankees for future considerations; in February 1996, the teams agreed on Blaise Kozeniewski as the return. With the Yankees, Raines received two World Series rings in 1996 and 1998. While his playing time was curtailed due to injuries, he contributed to a loose clubhouse atmosphere, and was productive when he came up to the plate. With the Yankees, Raines stole his 800th base on June 10, 1998.

In January 1999, Raines signed as a free agent with the Oakland Athletics. After a kidney biopsy on July 23, Raines was diagnosed with lupus and spent the rest of the year undergoing treatment and recovery.

=== Recovery and return ===
Raines was signed by the Yankees as a free agent on February 1, 2000, but was released on March 23. On December 21, Raines was signed by the Expos. At the Expos home opener in 2001, Raines received what he described as the longest and loudest standing ovation in his entire career, resulting in the pitcher walking him on four pitches. With limited playing time, Raines batted .308, with a .433 on-base percentage and a .436 slugging percentage. That same year, he was inducted into the team's Hall of Fame.

Raines underwent surgery on May 31 due to a left shoulder strain, and spent time rehabilitating with the Expos Triple-A club, the Ottawa Lynx. On August 21, 2001, Raines and his son, Tim Raines Jr., became the first father-son pair to play against each other in an official professional baseball game, when the Lynx played the Rochester Red Wings (the two had faced each other earlier in the year during spring training). Raines returned to the major league club on August 22.

On October 3, the Expos traded Raines to the Baltimore Orioles, thereby permitting Raines to play in a major league game with his son. On October 4, Raines played left field for Baltimore and Raines Jr. played center field, becoming the second father and son team to play for the same major league team (a feat previously accomplished by Ken Griffey Sr. and Ken Griffey Jr.).

Raines played his last season in 2002 with the Florida Marlins. He is one of only 29 players in baseball history to date to have appeared in Major League baseball games in four decades, was the last active player who was involved with the Pittsburgh drug trials, and also the last MLB batter to wear a batting helmet with no ear flap. (Julio Franco, who retired in 2007, was also eligible to wear a batting helmet with no ear flap, but preferred not to do so.)

== Career statistics ==
In a 23-year career, Raines played in 2,502 games accumulating 2,605 hits in 8,872 at bats for a .294 career batting average along with 170 home runs, 980 runs batted in, a .385 on-base percentage and a .425 slugging percentage. He ended his career with a .987 fielding percentage. Raines stole at least 70 bases in each of his first six full seasons (1981–1986), leading the National League in stolen bases each season from 1981 to 1984, with a career high of 90 steals in 1983. Raines also led the National League in runs scored twice (1983 and 1987). Raines batted over .300 in five full seasons and over .320 from 1985 to 1987, winning the 1986 National League batting title with a .334 average. He also had six full seasons with an on-base percentage above .390.

With 808 steals in his career, Raines has the fourth-highest total in major league history, behind Rickey Henderson, Lou Brock and Ty Cobb. Some sources, such as Baseball Reference, also place Raines behind Billy Hamilton, who recorded over 900 steals from 1888 to 1901; however, nearly 800 of these were achieved prior to 1898, when the definition of a steal was altered, and these early steals are not officially recognized. Raines's career stolen base percentage (84.7%) was the highest in major league history for players with 400 or more attempts. (Caught stealing data is incomplete prior to the 1951 season.) Raines set an American League records of 40 consecutive successful steal attempts between July 1993 and August 1995 (the record was broken by Ichiro Suzuki in May 2007, when he completed 45 consecutive steals).

Among switch hitters, Raines ranks sixth in career hits (2,605), fourth in runs (1,571), walks (1,330) and times on base (3,977), fifth in plate appearances (10,359), seventh in singles (1,892), doubles (430), total bases (3,771) and at bats (8,872), eighth in triples (113) and tenth in extra base hits (713).

Raines held the Expos/Washington Nationals franchise records for career runs (947) until May 2021, when Ryan Zimmerman surpassed him. Raines holds the Nationals/Expos franchise records for steals (635), singles (1,163), triples (82) and walks (793), and was the seventh player whose career began after 1945 to retire with over 1,500 runs and 100 triples. (Note: The previous six were Willie Mays, Lou Brock, Pete Rose, George Brett, Robin Yount and Paul Molitor.) His 1,966 games in left field ranked seventh in major league history when he retired.

Raines ranks among the top 100 position players in Wins Above Replacement as determined by both Baseball Reference and FanGraphs.

=== League leading statistics ===
Reference: Baseball-Reference.com Leader and Record Board Index

- Led the National League in batting average in 1986 (.334), the third switch hitter to win the NL batting title
- Led the National League in on-base percentage in 1986 (.413)
- Led the major leagues in stolen bases in 1981 (71) and 1984 (75)
- Led the National League in stolen bases in 1982 (78) and 1983 (90)
- Led the major leagues in runs scored in 1983 (133) and 1987 (123)
- Led the National League for times on base in 1983 (282), 1984 (281), and 1986 (274)
- Led the National League in outfield assists in 1983 (21)
- Tied for the National League lead in double plays by an outfielder in 1985 (4)

=== Expos records ===
- Single-season record for plate appearances (731 in 1982)
- Single-season record for runs (133 in 1983)
- Single-season record for triples (13 in 1985); shared with Rodney Scott and Mitch Webster
- Career record for singles (1,163)
- Career record for triples (82)
- Career record for walks (793)
- Career record for stolen bases (635)

Source: Washington Nationals Batting Leaders from Baseball Reference

== Honors and awards ==
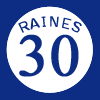
Raines' uniform number 30 was retired by the Montreal Expos in 2004.

Raines was a National League All-Star in 7 consecutive seasons (1981–1987), and was named the Most Valuable Player of the 1987 All-Star Game.

In 1981, The Sporting News named Raines the National League Rookie of the Year.

Raines finished in the top 10 in voting for the NL Most Valuable Player Award three times (1983, 1986, 1987). He won a Silver Slugger Award as an outfielder in 1986 when he led the National League in both batting average and on-base percentage.

In 2013, Raines was elected into the Canadian Baseball Hall of Fame.

On January 18, 2017, Raines was elected to the National Baseball Hall of Fame and Museum. He was formally inducted on July 30. His plaque depicts him in an Expos cap.

The baseball complex at Seminole High School in Sanford, Florida, Raines' alma mater, has been renamed Tim Raines Athletic Park in his honor, and Raines' number 22 has been retired at the school. Raines was also gifted a ceremonious key to the city of Sanford in March 2019, and the Sanford Historical Museum dedicated an exhibit to Raines, filling it with memorabilia from his career.

== National Baseball Hall of Fame ==
Raines was elected to the Hall of Fame in 2017, appearing on 86.0% of ballots cast. He was eligible for election to the Baseball Hall of Fame in January 2008, and various sabermetricians and commentators had supported his induction prior to his being elected in 2017.

History of Hall of Fame vote support
| Year of Hall of Fame balloting | Percentage |
|---|---|
| 2008 | 24.3% |
| 2009 | 22.6% |
| 2010 | 30.4% |
| 2011 | 37.5% |
| 2012 | 48.7% |
| 2013 | 52.2% |
| 2014 | 46.1% |
| 2015 | 55.0% |
| 2016 | 69.8% |
| 2017 | 86.0% |

== Coaching career ==
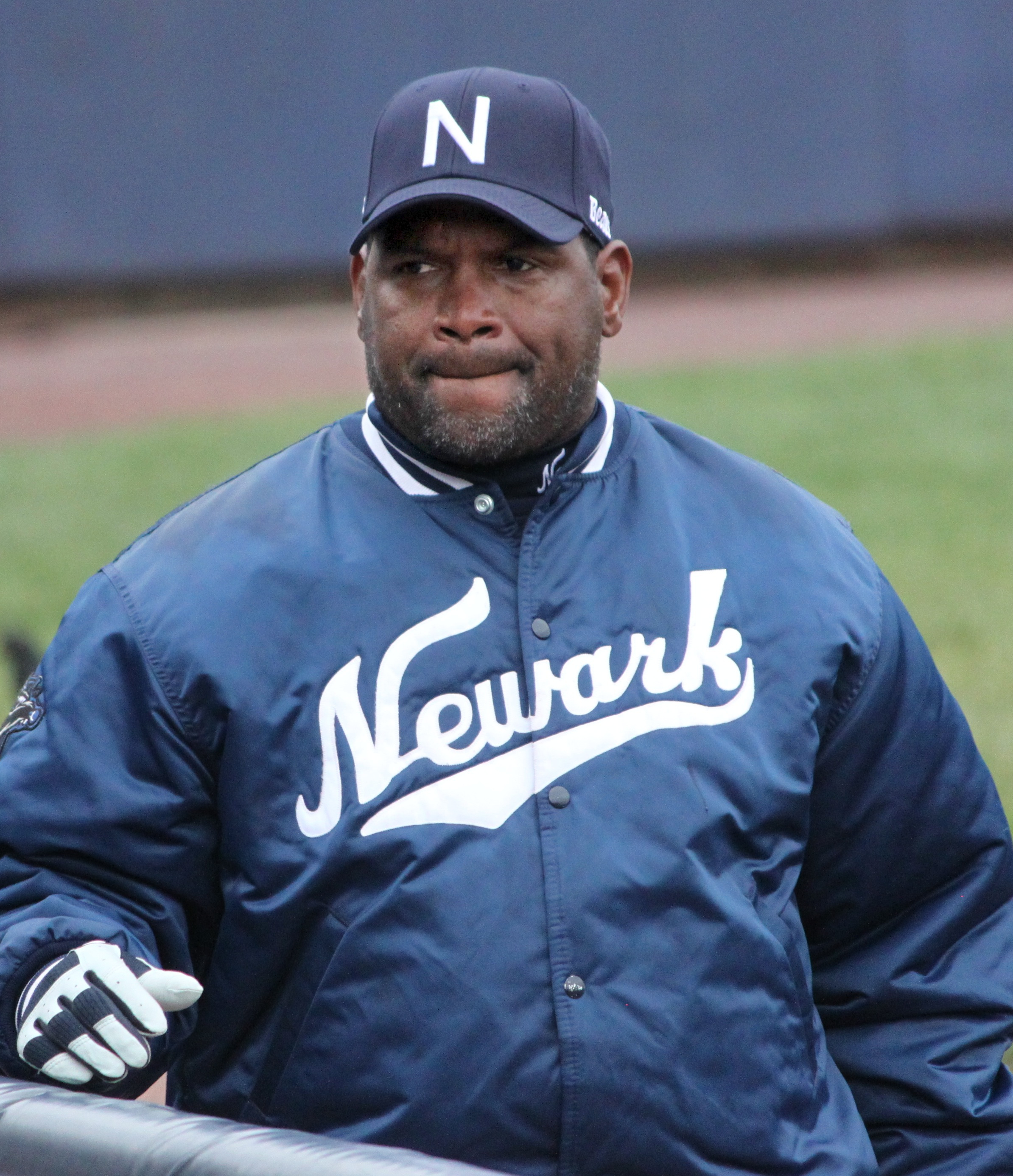
Raines coaching the Newark Bears in 2011

Raines began his coaching career in 2003 as manager of the Class A-Advanced Brevard County Manatees affiliate of the Expos. He was promoted to the major league team in 2004 and was present for the Expos' final games as a Montreal franchise.

He was a coach for the White Sox from November 2004 until October 2006. During the 2005 World Series Championship season, Raines served as first base coach. During the 2006 season, he served as bench coach. He was the hitting coach for the minor-league Harrisburg Senators in 2007, but was not retained by the team for 2008. Raines signed a two-year contract to manage the Newark Bears of the Atlantic League, starting in 2009. After the 2010 season, the Bears moved to the Canadian American Association of Professional Baseball, and the team announced Raines would return to manage in 2011. In 2012, he was an assistant coach and Director of Player Development for the Bears. The Toronto Blue Jays hired Raines as a minor league baserunning and outfield coach in 2013.

== Personal life ==
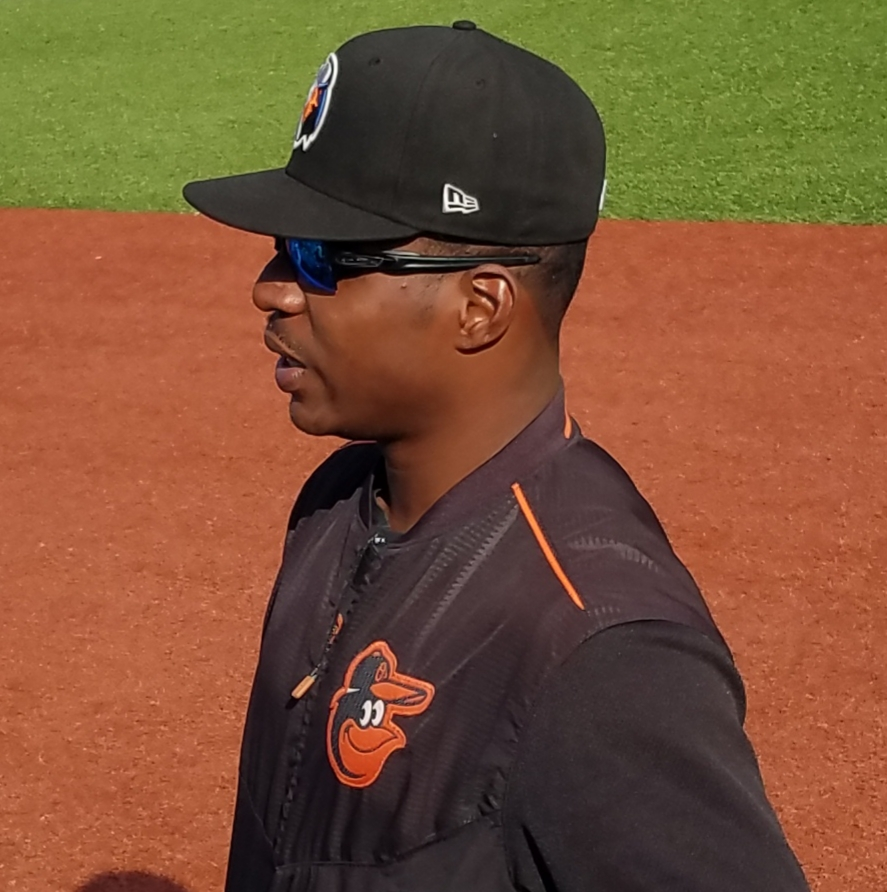
Tim Raines Jr. as hitting coach for the Aberdeen IronBirds in 2018

In 1979, Raines married Virginia Hilton, a classmate at Seminole High School. The couple had two children, including Tim Jr.. His marriage to Virginia ended in 2005.

In 2007, Raines moved to Estrella Mountain Ranch, a suburb of Phoenix, Arizona, and married Shannon Watson. She had twins in 2010. In 2017, Raines published his autobiography, written with journalist Alan Maimon, Rock Solid: My Life in Baseball's Fast Lane.

== See also ==
- List of Major League Baseball stolen base records
- List of Major League Baseball players who played in four decades
- List of Major League Baseball career hits leaders
- List of Major League Baseball career doubles leaders
- List of Major League Baseball career triples leaders
- List of Major League Baseball career runs scored leaders
- List of Major League Baseball players to hit for the cycle
- List of Major League Baseball batting champions
- List of Major League Baseball career stolen bases leaders
- List of Major League Baseball annual runs scored leaders
- List of Major League Baseball annual stolen base leaders
- List of Major League Baseball annual doubles leaders
- Major League Baseball titles leaders

== Notes ==
Achievements
| Preceded by Candy Maldonado | Hitting for the cycle August 16, 1987 | Succeeded by Albert Hall |
Sporting positions
| Preceded by Rafael Santana | Chicago White Sox First base coach 2005 | Succeeded by Harold Baines |
| Preceded by Harold Baines | Chicago White Sox Bench coach 2006 | Succeeded by Joey Cora |
