= Scott Sanderson (baseball) =

American baseball player (1956–2019)

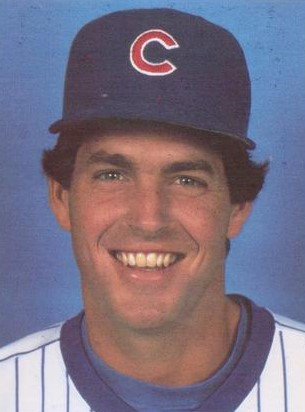
- Pitcher
- Born: July 22, 1956; Dearborn, Michigan, U.S.
- Died: April 11, 2019 (aged 62); Lake Forest, Illinois, U.S.
- Batted: Right Threw: Right

MLB debut
- August 6, 1978, for the Montreal Expos

Last MLB appearance
- May 15, 1996, for the California Angels

MLB statistics
- Win–loss record: 163–143
- Earned run average: 3.84
- Strikeouts: 1,611
- Stats at Baseball Reference

Teams
- Montreal Expos (1978–1983); Chicago Cubs (1984–1989); Oakland Athletics (1990); New York Yankees (1991–1992); California Angels (1993); San Francisco Giants (1993); Chicago White Sox (1994); California Angels (1995–1996)

Career highlights and awards
- All-Star (1991)
Medals
Men's baseball
Representing United States
Pan American Games
| Silver medal – second place | 1975 Mexico City | Team |

Scott Douglas Sanderson (July 22, 1956 – April 11, 2019) was an American professional baseball pitcher. He played in Major League Baseball (MLB) for the Montreal Expos, Chicago Cubs, Oakland Athletics, New York Yankees, California Angels, San Francisco Giants, and Chicago White Sox. Following his retirement from playing professional baseball he worked as a sports agent and radio broadcaster.

== Early life ==
Sanderson attended Glenbrook North High School in Northbrook, Illinois, and Vanderbilt University. Sanderson pitched in only 28 minor league games before being called up to the major leagues.

== Career ==
=== MLB career ===
Sanderson went 4–2 in nine starts in his rookie season with the Expos in 1978, posting a 2.51 ERA.

Sanderson remained a starter for the next five seasons, averaging over ten wins per season, including sixteen wins in 1980.

The Expos dealt him to the Cubs in a three-way team trade in December 1983.

He pitched in the 1990 World Series as a member of the Oakland Athletics, making two relief appearances as Oakland was swept by the Cincinnati Reds in four games.

He had one of his finest seasons in 1991, when he won 16 games and was named to the American League All-Star Team. The following season, however, he had a league-worst 4.93 earned run average.

=== Work as an agent ===
Sanderson became an agent after the end of his time as a professional baseball player. Sanderson's agency has offices in Atlanta and in his hometown of Chicago, where he spent the majority of his time. His clients included, at one time or another, Frank Thomas, Josh Beckett, and Lance Berkman.

=== Broadcasting ===
In 1997, Sanderson briefly filled in as a radio commentator during Cubs broadcasts on WGN (AM). In August 1997, Sanderson worked two weekend games of Cubs broadcasts on WGN as a color commentator with radio play-by-play man Pat Hughes while Cubs color commentator Ron Santo was sidelined by inflamed vocal cords.

== Personal ==
Sanderson was married with two children, a son and a daughter. He enjoyed playing in golf tournaments around the United States. In his later years, Sanderson had his voice box removed and suffered a stroke. He died from cancer on April 11, 2019, aged 62.
