= Chris Speier =

American baseball player and coach (born 1950)

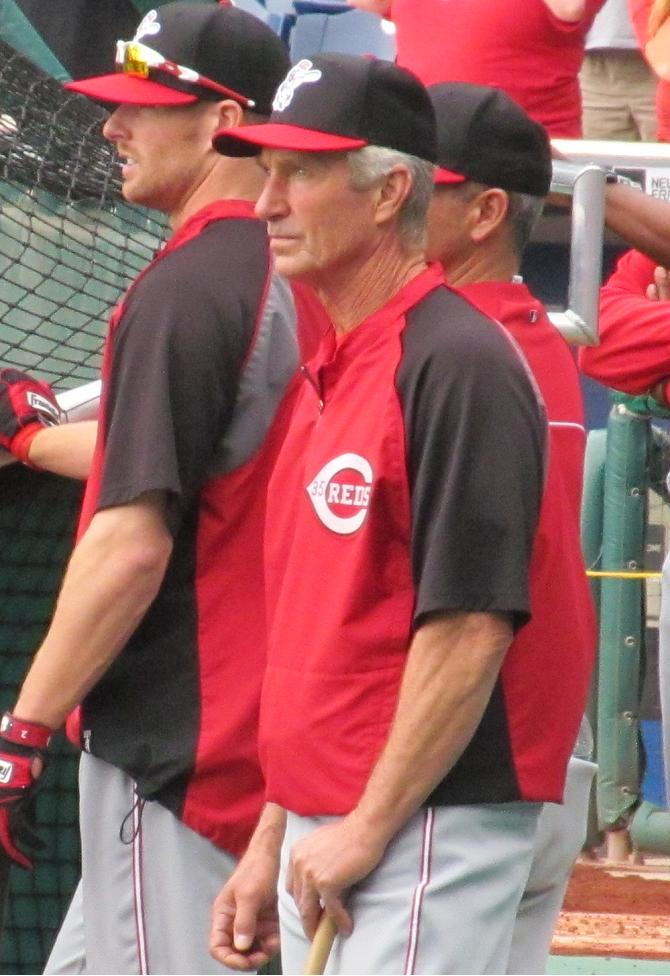
- Speier as a Cincinnati Reds coach in 2013
- Shortstop
- Born: June 28, 1950 (age 76); Alameda, California, U.S.
- Batted: Right Threw: Right

MLB debut
- April 7, 1971, for the San Francisco Giants

Last MLB appearance
- October 1, 1989, for the San Francisco Giants

MLB statistics
- Batting average: .246
- Home runs: 112
- Runs batted in: 720
- Stats at Baseball Reference

Teams
- As player: San Francisco Giants (1971–1977); Montreal Expos (1977–1984); St. Louis Cardinals (1984); Minnesota Twins (1984); Chicago Cubs (1985–1986); San Francisco Giants (1987–1989); As coach: Milwaukee Brewers (2000); Arizona Diamondbacks (2001); Oakland Athletics (2004); Chicago Cubs (2005–2006); Cincinnati Reds (2008–2013); Washington Nationals (2016–2017); Houston Astros (2020)

Career highlights and awards
- 3× All-Star (1972–1974); World Series champion (2001); San Francisco Giants Wall of Fame; Montreal Expos Hall of Fame

Christopher Edward Speier (born June 28, 1950) is an American former professional baseball player. He played in Major League Baseball as a shortstop, most notably for the San Francisco Giants and the Montreal Expos. He is known by the nickname "the Alameda Rifle" as a native of the San Francisco Bay Area city who possessed a strong arm during his days as an active player.

== Playing career ==
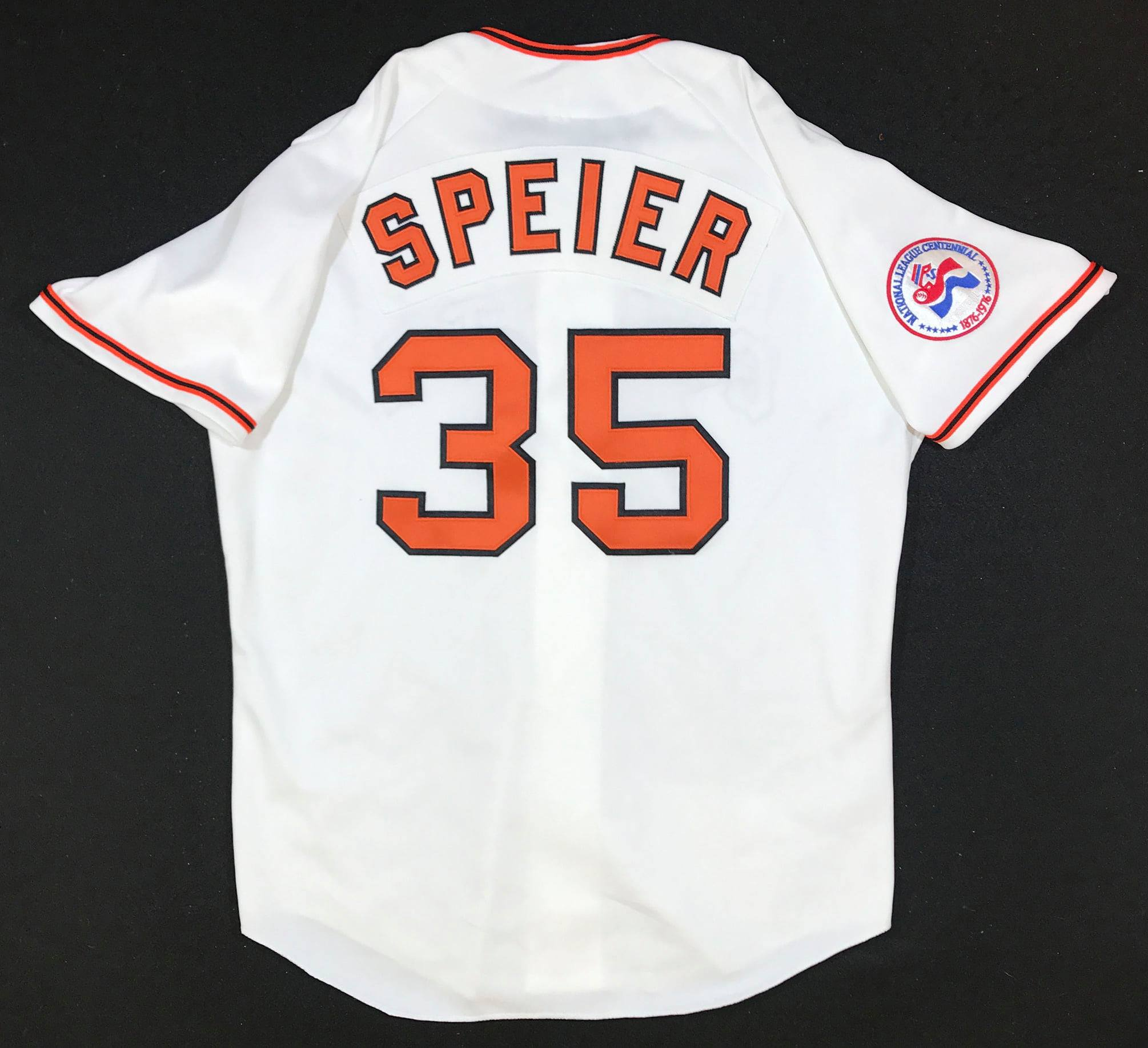
1976 San Francisco Giants #35 Chris Speier home jersey

Speier was drafted by the Giants as the second overall pick in the first round of 1970 Major League Baseball draft. Speier played 19 seasons in the Major Leagues as a shortstop for the Montreal Expos, San Francisco Giants, Chicago Cubs and briefly for the St. Louis Cardinals and Minnesota Twins during the 1984 season. In an exchange of starting shortstops, he was traded from the Giants to the Expos for Tim Foli on April 26, 1977.

Speier accrued a career .246 batting average and a .970 fielding percentage at shortstop. His overall playing strengths were solid fielding and a selective eye at the plate. He was also named to the National League All-Star team during the 1972, 1973, and 1974 seasons as a member of the Giants. Speier won the 1987 Willie Mac Award for his spirit and leadership during his second time with the Giants.

He hit for the cycle twice in his major league career, on July 20, 1978, as a member of the Montreal Expos in a 7–3 victory over the Atlanta Braves at Montreal and nearly 10 years later on July 9, 1988, as a member of the San Francisco Giants in a 21–2 rout of the St. Louis Cardinals at Candlestick Park.

== Coaching career ==
2000 Milwaukee Brewers Third Base Coach Wearing #43

2001 Arizona Diamondbacks Third Base Coach Wearing #35

2004 Oakland Athletics Bench Coach Wearing #46

2005-2006 Chicago Cubs Third Base Coach Wearing #35

2008-2013 Cincinnati Reds bench coach wearing #35/interim third base coach in 2013 when Mark Berry was receiving treatment for throat cancer

2016-2017 Washington Nationals Bench Coach Wearing #35

2020 Houston Astros Quality Control Coach Wearing #36

Speier was a coach on the World Series champion Arizona Diamondbacks in 2001. He was the third base coach for the Chicago Cubs from 2005 to 2006.

Speier was signed by the Cincinnati Reds on October 29, 2007, as an infield coach and served as the Reds' bench coach. He also filled in when manager Dusty Baker was hospitalized in Chicago in September 2012 – this was when they clinched a playoff berth. He was replaced as the bench coach by Jay Bell when Baker was fired, but stayed on in the Reds organization as a Special Assistant to General Manager Walt Jocketty.

When Baker became the manager of the Washington Nationals before the 2016 season, Speier was named bench coach; his contract expired after the 2017 season.

== Career statistics ==
Years	Games	PA	AB	R	H	2B	3B	HR	RBI	BB	SO	AVG	OBP	SLG	FLD%
19	2260	8155	7156	770	1759	302	50	112	720	847	988	.246	.327	.349	.971

Speier also played 185 games at third base, 138 at second base, and 2 at first base. In the post-season covering 17 games (1971, 1981, 1987 NLCS) he batted .280 (14-for-50) with 8 runs, 1 home run, and 4 RBI.

== Personal life ==
Speier was born and raised in Alameda, California, also the hometown of Major Leaguers Willie Stargell, Dontrelle Willis and Jimmy Rollins. He graduated from Alameda High School.

Speier is the father of former MLB relief pitcher Justin Speier and the uncle of Gabe Speier.

Speier converted to Catholicism after meeting his now ex-wife and became an activist in the pro-life movement. In 1993, he was the principal of the religious Ville de Marie Academy in Scottsdale, Arizona. The school was not accredited by the state nor was it affiliated with the local diocese.

== See also ==
- List of Major League Baseball players to hit for the cycle

Awards and achievements
Preceded by Andre Thornton; Robin Yount	Hitting for the cycle July 20, 1978; July 9, 1988	Succeeded by Mike Cubbage; Mike Greenwell
Preceded by Mike Krukow	Willie Mac Award; 1987	Succeeded by José Uribe
Sporting positions
Preceded by Wendell Kim	Chicago Cubs third base coach 2005–2006	Succeeded by Mike Quade
