= 1981 Major League Baseball season =

1981 MLB season
- League: American League (AL); National League (NL)
- Sport: Baseball
- Duration: Regular season: April 9 – June 11, 1981 August 10 – October 5, 1981 (AL); April 8 – June 11, 1981 August 10 – October 4, 1981 (NL); Postseason: October 6–28, 1981
- Games: 162 (scheduled); 103–110 (AL); 103–111 (NL)
- Teams: 26 (14 AL, 12 NL)
- TV partner(s): ABC, NBC, USA

Draft
- Top draft pick: Mike Moore
- Picked by: Seattle Mariners

Regular season
- Season MVP: AL: Rollie Fingers (MIL); NL: Mike Schmidt (PHI)

Postseason
- AL champions: New York Yankees
- AL runners-up: Oakland Athletics
- NL champions: Los Angeles Dodgers
- NL runners-up: Montreal Expos

World Series
- Champions: Los Angeles Dodgers
- Runners-up: New York Yankees
- World Series MVP: Ron Cey, Pedro Guerrero, and Steve Yeager (LAD)

MLB seasons
- ← 1980 1982 →

Locations of teams for the 1977–1981 American League seasons
West East
Locations of teams for the 1977–1992 National League seasons
West East

The 1981 major league baseball season began on April 8, before being interrupted from June 12 to August 9, caused by a strike. In what became a split season, the second half of the season began on August 10 following a settlement, with the regular season ending on October 5. The postseason began on October 6. In the 11th iteration of this World Series matchup, the 78th World Series then began on October 20 and concluded on October 28 with the Los Angeles Dodgers of the National League defeating the New York Yankees of the American League, four games to two, to win their fifth title in franchise history.

The 52nd All-Star Game, originally scheduled for July 14, was held on August 9 at Cleveland Stadium, home of the Cleveland Indians. The National League won, 5–4, and was the 10th win in what would be an 11-game win streak that lasted until 1983.

== Strike ==
On May 29, Major League Baseball Players Association (MLBPA) voted unanimously to strike on due to the unresolved issue of free agent compensation. The deadline was extended briefly, however, after the MLBPA's unfair labor complaint was heard by the National Labor Relations Board (NLRB). The strike commenced on June 12. The strike came only a year since the previous work stoppage in 1980, although that only affected the end of spring training.

Following a 50-day negotiation period, a settlement was reached on July 31 that allowed teams that lost a "premium" free agent to be compensated by drawing from a pool of players left unprotected from all of the clubs rather than just the signing club. Players agreed to restricting free agency to players with six or more years of major league service.

Play resumed on August 9 with the All-Star Game, which was originally scheduled for July 14. The second half of the regular season resumed on August 10, with the season now in a split season format.

== Schedule ==
The 1981 schedule, originally scheduled with a 162 game schedule per team, consisted of 103–110 games for all 14 teams in the American League and consisted of 103–111 games for all 12 teams in the National League. Both leagues saw different schedule formats, as they had since 1977. The American League was split into two seven-team divisions. Each team was (pre-strike) scheduled to play 13 games against their six division rivals, totaling 78 games, and 12 games against seven opponents, totaling 84 interdivision games. This format, used since 1979 would be used until the league realigned into three division for the 1994 season. Meanwhile, the National League was split into two six-team divisions. Each team was (pre-strike) scheduled to play 18 games against their five division rivals, totaling 90 games, and 12 games against six interdivision opponents, totaling 72 games. Due to the strike, the total number of games were inconsistently cut down, as the nearly two-months of scheduled games were either cancelled or rescheduled. The structure of the 162-game format that was put in place by the National League 1969 and American League in 1977, would continue to be the format in use until 1993.

National League Opening Day took place on April 8 with the Philadelphia Phillies and Cincinnati Reds playing, while American League Opening Day took place the following day, featuring eight teams. The National League would see its final day of the regular season on October 4, featuring 12 teams, while the American League would see its final day of the season on October 5, with a game between the Kansas City Royals and Cleveland Indians. Each League Division Series took place between October 6 and October 11. The American League Championship Series took place between October 13 and October 15, while the National League Championship Series took place between October 13 and October 19. The World Series took place between October 20 and October 28.

== Rule change ==
The 1981 season saw the following rule change:

- The designated hitter must come to bat at least once if he is named in the starting lineup, barring a pitching change by the opposing team.

== Teams ==
League	Division	Team	City	Ballpark	Capacity	Manager
American League	East	Baltimore Orioles	Baltimore, Maryland	Baltimore Memorial Stadium	52,862	Earl Weaver
American League	East	Boston Red Sox	Boston, Massachusetts	Fenway Park	33,538	Ralph Houk
American League	East	Cleveland Indians	Cleveland, Ohio	Cleveland Stadium	74,483	Dave Garcia
American League	East	Detroit Tigers	Detroit, Michigan	Tiger Stadium	52,806	Sparky Anderson
American League	East	Milwaukee Brewers	Milwaukee, Wisconsin	Milwaukee County Stadium	53,192	Buck Rodgers
American League	East	New York Yankees	New York, New York	Yankee Stadium	57,545	Gene Michael
American League	East	New York Yankees	New York, New York	Yankee Stadium	57,545	Bob Lemon
American League	East	Toronto Blue Jays	Toronto, Ontario	Exhibition Stadium	43,737	Bobby Mattick
American League	West	California Angels	Anaheim, California	Anaheim Stadium	64,573	Jim Fregosi
American League	West	California Angels	Anaheim, California	Anaheim Stadium	64,573	Gene Mauch
American League	West	Chicago White Sox	Chicago, Illinois	Comiskey Park	44,492	Tony La Russa
American League	West	Kansas City Royals	Kansas City, Missouri	Royals Stadium	40,613	Jim Frey
American League	West	Kansas City Royals	Kansas City, Missouri	Royals Stadium	40,613	Dick Howser
American League	West	Minnesota Twins	Bloomington, Minnesota	Metropolitan Stadium	45,919	Johnny Goryl
American League	West	Minnesota Twins	Bloomington, Minnesota	Metropolitan Stadium	45,919	Billy Gardner
American League	West	Oakland Athletics	Oakland, California	Oakland–Alameda County Coliseum	50,000	Billy Martin
American League	West	Seattle Mariners	Seattle, Washington	Kingdome	59,059	Maury Wills
American League	West	Seattle Mariners	Seattle, Washington	Kingdome	59,059	Rene Lachemann
American League	West	Texas Rangers	Arlington, Texas	Arlington Stadium	41,284	Don Zimmer
National League	East	Chicago Cubs	Chicago, Illinois	Wrigley Field	37,702	Joey Amalfitano
National League	East	Montreal Expos	Montreal, Quebec	Olympic Stadium	59,149	Dick Williams
National League	East	Montreal Expos	Montreal, Quebec	Olympic Stadium	59,149	Jim Fanning
National League	East	New York Mets	New York, New York	Shea Stadium	55,300	Joe Torre
National League	East	Philadelphia Phillies	Philadelphia, Pennsylvania	Veterans Stadium	62,382	Dallas Green
National League	East	Pittsburgh Pirates	Pittsburgh, Pennsylvania	Three Rivers Stadium	58,722	Chuck Tanner
National League	East	St. Louis Cardinals	St. Louis, Missouri	Civic Center Busch Memorial Stadium	53,138	Whitey Herzog
National League	West	Atlanta Braves	Atlanta, Georgia	Atlanta–Fulton County Stadium	52,194	Bobby Cox
National League	West	Cincinnati Reds	Cincinnati, Ohio	Riverfront Stadium	52,953	John McNamara
National League	West	Houston Astros	Houston, Texas	Houston Astrodome	47,000	Bill Virdon
National League	West	Los Angeles Dodgers	Los Angeles, California	Dodger Stadium	56,000	Tommy Lasorda
National League	West	San Diego Padres	San Diego, California	Jack Murphy Stadium	50,000	Frank Howard
National League	West	San Francisco Giants	San Francisco, California	Candlestick Park	58,495	Frank Robinson

== Standings ==
=== American League ===
AL East
Team	W	L	Pct.	GB	Home	Road
Milwaukee Brewers	62	47	.569	—	28‍–‍21	34‍–‍26
Baltimore Orioles	59	46	.562	1	33‍–‍22	26‍–‍24
New York Yankees	59	48	.551	2	32‍–‍19	27‍–‍29
Detroit Tigers	60	49	.550	2	32‍–‍23	28‍–‍26
Boston Red Sox	59	49	.546	2½	30‍–‍23	29‍–‍26
Cleveland Indians	52	51	.505	7	25‍–‍29	27‍–‍22
Toronto Blue Jays	37	69	.349	23½	17‍–‍36	20‍–‍33

AL East First Half Standings	W	L	Pct.	GB
New York Yankees	34	22	.607	—
Baltimore Orioles	31	23	.574	2
Milwaukee Brewers	31	25	.554	3
Detroit Tigers	31	26	.544	3 1/2
Boston Red Sox	30	26	.536	4
Cleveland Indians	26	24	.520	5
Toronto Blue Jays	16	42	.276	19

AL East Second Half Standings	W	L	Pct.	GB
Milwaukee Brewers	31	22	.585	—
Boston Red Sox	29	23	.558	1 1/2
Detroit Tigers	29	23	.558	1 1/2
Baltimore Orioles	28	23	.549	2
Cleveland Indians	26	27	.491	5
New York Yankees	25	26	.490	5
Toronto Blue Jays	21	27	.438	7 1/2

AL West
Team	W	L	Pct.	GB	Home	Road
Oakland Athletics	64	45	.587	—	35‍–‍21	29‍–‍24
Texas Rangers	57	48	.543	5	32‍–‍24	25‍–‍24
Chicago White Sox	54	52	.509	8½	25‍–‍24	29‍–‍28
Kansas City Royals	50	53	.485	11	19‍–‍28	31‍–‍25
California Angels	51	59	.464	13½	26‍–‍28	25‍–‍31
Seattle Mariners	44	65	.404	20	20‍–‍37	24‍–‍28
Minnesota Twins	41	68	.376	23	24‍–‍36	17‍–‍32

AL West First Half Standings	W	L	Pct.	GB
Oakland Athletics	37	23	.617	—
Texas Rangers	33	22	.600	1 1/2
Chicago White Sox	31	22	.585	2 1/2
California Angels	31	29	.517	6
Kansas City Royals	20	30	.400	12
Seattle Mariners	21	36	.368	14 1/2
Minnesota Twins	17	39	.304	18

AL West Second Half Standings	W	L	Pct.	GB
Kansas City Royals	30	23	.566	—
Oakland Athletics	27	22	.551	1
Texas Rangers	24	26	.480	4 1/2
Minnesota Twins	24	29	.453	6
Seattle Mariners	23	29	.442	6 1/2
Chicago White Sox	23	30	.434	7
California Angels	20	30	.400	8 1/2

=== National League ===
NL East
Team	W	L	Pct.	GB	Home	Road
St. Louis Cardinals	59	43	.578	—	32‍–‍21	27‍–‍22
Montreal Expos	60	48	.556	2	38‍–‍18	22‍–‍30
Philadelphia Phillies	59	48	.551	2½	36‍–‍19	23‍–‍29
Pittsburgh Pirates	46	56	.451	13	22‍–‍28	24‍–‍28
New York Mets	41	62	.398	18½	24‍–‍27	17‍–‍35
Chicago Cubs	38	65	.369	21½	27‍–‍30	11‍–‍35

NL East First Half Standings	W	L	Pct.	GB
Philadelphia Phillies	34	21	.618	—
St. Louis Cardinals	30	20	.600	1 1/2
Montreal Expos	30	25	.545	4
Pittsburgh Pirates	25	23	.521	5 1/2
New York Mets	17	34	.333	15
Chicago Cubs	15	37	.288	17 1/2

NL East Second Half Standings	W	L	Pct.	GB
Montreal Expos	30	23	.566	—
St. Louis Cardinals	29	23	.558	1/2
Philadelphia Phillies	25	27	.481	4 1/2
New York Mets	24	28	.462	5 1/2
Chicago Cubs	23	28	.451	6
Pittsburgh Pirates	21	33	.389	9 1/2

NL West
Team	W	L	Pct.	GB	Home	Road
Cincinnati Reds	66	42	.611	—	32‍–‍22	34‍–‍20
Los Angeles Dodgers	63	47	.573	4	33‍–‍23	30‍–‍24
Houston Astros	61	49	.555	6	31‍–‍20	30‍–‍29
San Francisco Giants	56	55	.505	11½	29‍–‍24	27‍–‍31
Atlanta Braves	50	56	.472	15	22‍–‍27	28‍–‍29
San Diego Padres	41	69	.373	26	20‍–‍35	21‍–‍34

NL West First Half Standings	W	L	Pct.	GB
Los Angeles Dodgers	36	21	.632	—
Cincinnati Reds	35	21	.625	1/2
Houston Astros	28	29	.491	8
Atlanta Braves	25	29	.463	9 1/2
San Francisco Giants	27	32	.458	10
San Diego Padres	23	33	.411	12 1/2

NL West Second Half Standings	W	L	Pct.	GB
Houston Astros	33	20	.623	—
Cincinnati Reds	31	21	.596	1 1/2
San Francisco Giants	29	23	.558	3 1/2
Los Angeles Dodgers	27	26	.509	6
Atlanta Braves	25	27	.481	7 1/2
San Diego Padres	18	36	.333	15 1/2

=== Tie games ===
5 tie games (1 in AL, 4 in NL), which are not factored into winning percentage or games behind (and were often replayed again) occurred throughout the season.

==== American League ====
The Minnesota Twins and Seattle Mariners had one tie each.

- April 29, Seattle Mariners vs. Minnesota Twins, tied at 7 following a shortened eight innings on account of a rain delay.

==== National League ====
The Chicago Cubs had three ties. The New York Mets had two ties. The Atlanta Braves, Pittsburgh Pirates, and St. Louis Cardinals had one tie each.

- April 22, New York Mets vs. Pittsburgh Pirates, tied at 2 through the top of the 9th on account of rain.
- April 29 (game 2), St. Louis Cardinals vs. Chicago Cubs, tied at 2 through 11 innings on account of darkness.
- May 10, Chicago Cubs vs. Atlanta Braves, tied at 5 through 14 innings on account of rain.
- October 1, Chicago Cubs vs. New York Mets, tied at 2 through the top of the 9th. Prior to the bottom of the 9th, a one hour, 14 minute rain delay occurred, before being called a tie on account of rain.

== Postseason ==
The postseason began on October 6 and ended on October 28 with the Los Angeles Dodgers defeating the New York Yankees in the 1981 World Series in six games.

=== Bracket ===
Division Series (ALDS, NLDS)
E1	NY Yankees	3
E2	Milwaukee	2
American League
W1	Oakland	3
W2	Kansas City	0
E1	Philadelphia	2
E2	Montreal	3
National League
W1	Los Angeles	3
W2	Houston	2

League Championship Series (ALCS, NLCS)
E1	NY Yankees	3
W1	Oakland	0
E2	Montreal	2
W1	Los Angeles	3

World Series
AL	NY Yankees	2
NL	Los Angeles	4

NOTE: Due to a strike in mid-season, the season was divided into a first half and a second half. The division winner of the first half (denoted E1, W1) played the division winner of the second half (denoted E2, W2).

== Managerial changes ==
=== Off-season ===
Team	Former Manager	New Manager
Boston Red Sox	Johnny Pesky	Ralph Houk
New York Yankees	Dick Howser	Gene Michael
San Diego Padres	Jerry Coleman	Frank Howard
San Francisco Giants	Dave Bristol	Frank Robinson
St. Louis Cardinals	Red Schoendienst	Whitey Herzog
Texas Rangers	Pat Corrales	Don Zimmer

=== In-season ===
Team	Former Manager	New Manager
California Angels	Jim Fregosi	Gene Mauch
Kansas City Royals	Jim Frey	Dick Howser
Minnesota Twins	Johnny Goryl	Billy Gardner
Montreal Expos	Dick Williams	Jim Fanning
New York Yankees	Gene Michael	Bob Lemon
Seattle Mariners	Maury Wills	Rene Lachemann

== League leaders ==
=== American League ===
Hitting leaders
Stat	Player	Total
AVG	Carney Lansford (BOS)	.336
OPS	Dwight Evans (BOS)	.937
HR	Tony Armas (OAK); Dwight Evans (BOS); Bobby Grich (CAL); Eddie Murray (BAL)	22
RBI	Eddie Murray (BAL)	78
R	Rickey Henderson (OAK)	89
H	Rickey Henderson (OAK)	135
SB	Rickey Henderson (OAK)	56

Pitching leaders
Stat	Player	Total
W	Dennis Martínez (BAL); Steve McCatty (OAK); Jack Morris (DET); Pete Vuckovich (MIL)	14
L	Juan Berenguer (TOR/KC); Jerry Koosman (CWS/MIN); Luis Leal (TOR)	13
ERA	Sammy Stewart (BAL)	2.32
K	Len Barker (CLE)	127
IP	Dennis Leonard (KC)	201.2
SV	Rollie Fingers (MIL)	28
WHIP	Ron Guidry (NYY)	0.992

=== National League ===
Hitting leaders
Stat	Player	Total
AVG	Bill Madlock (PIT)	.341
OPS	Mike Schmidt (PHI)	1.080
HR	Mike Schmidt (PHI)	31
RBI	Mike Schmidt (PHI)	91
R	Mike Schmidt (PHI)	78
H	Pete Rose (PHI)	140
SB	Tim Raines (MON)	71

Pitching leaders
Stat	Player	Total
W	Tom Seaver (CIN)	14
L	Steve Mura (SD); Pat Zachry (NYM)	14
ERA	Nolan Ryan (HOU)	1.69
K	Fernando Valenzuela (LAD)	180
IP	Fernando Valenzuela (LAD)	192.1
SV	Bruce Sutter (STL)	25
WHIP	Don Sutton (HOU)	1.015

== Milestones ==
=== Batters ===
- Carl Yastrzemski (BOS):
  - Became the fifth player in major league history to play in 3,000 games on May 25 against the Cleveland Indians.
- Pete Rose (PHI):
  - Ties the National League record for career record for hits, set by Stan Musial, in the first inning on June 10 when hits a pitch off Nolan Ryan of the Houston Astros for the 3,630th hit of his career. He would break this record in his next game, in the eighth inning on August 10, when he hits a pitch off Mark Littell of the St. Louis Cardinals.

=== Pitching ===
==== Perfect games ====
- Len Barker (CLE):
  - Pitched the tenth perfect game in major league history and second in franchise history (the first franchise to do so) on May 15 against the Toronto Blue Jays. Barker threw 110 pitches, 78 for strikes, and struck out 11 in the 3–0 victory.

==== No-hitters ====
- Charlie Lea (MON):
  - Lea threw his first no-hitter and third no-hitter in franchise history, by defeating the San Francisco Giants 3–0 in the second game of a doubleheader on May 10. He walked four and struck out eight.
- Nolan Ryan (HOU):
  - Ryan threw his fifth no-hitter and seventh no-hitter in franchise history, by defeating the Los Angeles Dodgers 5–0 on September 26. He walked three and struck out 11. Ryan broke the record of four no-hitters by pitcher Sandy Koufax.

==== Other pitching accomplishments ====
- Tom Seaver (CIN):
  - Recorded his 3,000th career strikeout on April 18 by fanning Keith Hernandez of the St. Louis Cardinals in the fourth inning. Seaver becomes the fifth player to reach this mark.
- Steve Carlton (PHI):
  - Recorded his 3,000th career strikeout on April 29 by fanning Tim Wallach of the Montreal Expos in the first inning. Carlton becomes the sixth player to reach this mark. Carlton also became the first left-hander to achieve the feat. April 1981 is the only month in history to have two pitchers reach this milestone.
- Nolan Ryan (HOU):
  - Issued the 1,776th walk in his career on June 5 by walking Lee Mazzilli of the New York Mets in the fourth inning. Ryan breaks the record previously held by Early Wynn.

== Awards and honors ==
Baseball Writers' Association of America Awards
BBWAA Award	National League	American League
Rookie of the Year	Fernando Valenzuela (LAD)	Dave Righetti (NYY)
Cy Young Award	Fernando Valenzuela (LAD)	Rollie Fingers (MIL)
Most Valuable Player	Mike Schmidt (PHI)	Rollie Fingers (MIL)
Babe Ruth Award (World Series MVP)	Ron Cey (LAD)	—
Gold Glove Awards
Position	National League	American League
Pitcher	Steve Carlton (PHI)	Mike Norris (OAK)
Catcher	Gary Carter (MON)	Jim Sundberg (TEX)
First Baseman	Keith Hernandez (STL)	Mike Squires (CWS)
Second Baseman	Manny Trillo (PHI)	Frank White (KC)
Third Baseman	Mike Schmidt (PHI)	Buddy Bell (TEX)
Shortstop	Ozzie Smith (SD)	Alan Trammell (DET)
Outfielders	Dusty Baker (LAD)	Dwight Evans (BOS)
Outfielders	Andre Dawson (MON)	Rickey Henderson (OAK)
Outfielders	Garry Maddox (PHI)	Dwayne Murphy (OAK)
Silver Slugger Awards
Pitcher/Designated Hitter	Fernando Valenzuela (LAD)	Al Oliver (TEX)
Catcher	Gary Carter (MON)	Carlton Fisk (CWS)
First Baseman	Pete Rose (PHI)	Cecil Cooper (MIL)
Second Baseman	Manny Trillo (PHI)	Bobby Grich (CAL)
Third Baseman	Mike Schmidt (PHI)	Carney Lansford (BOS)
Shortstop	Dave Concepción (CIN)	Rick Burleson (CAL)
Outfielders	Dusty Baker (LAD)	Dwight Evans (BOS)
Outfielders	Andre Dawson (MON)	Rickey Henderson (OAK)
Outfielders	George Foster (CIN)	Dave Winfield (NYY)

=== Other awards ===
- Outstanding Designated Hitter Award: Greg Luzinski (CWS)
- Roberto Clemente Award (Humanitarian): Steve Garvey (LAD)
- Hutch Award: Johnny Bench (CIN)
- League Championship Series Most Valuable Player Award: Burt Hooton (LAD, National); Graig Nettles (NYY, American)
- Rolaids Relief Man Award: Bruce Sutter (STL, National); Rollie Fingers (MIL, American)
- Sport Magazine's World Series Most Valuable Player Award: Ron Cey (LAD), Pedro Guerrero (LAD), Steve Yeager (LAD)

The Sporting News Awards
Award	National League	American League
Player of the Year	Fernando Valenzuela (LAD)	—
Pitcher of the Year	Fernando Valenzuela (LAD)	Jack Morris (DET)
Fireman of the Year (Relief pitcher)	Bruce Sutter (STL)	Rollie Fingers (MIL)
Rookie Player of the Year	Tim Raines (MON)	Rich Gedman (BOS)
Rookie Pitcher of the Year	Fernando Valenzuela (LAD)	Dave Righetti (NYY)
Comeback Player of the Year	Bob Knepper (HOU)	Richie Zisk (SEA)
Manager of the Year	—	Billy Martin (OAK)
Executive of the Year	John McHale (MON)	—

=== Monthly awards ===
==== Player of the Month ====
Month	National League	American League
April	Dave Concepción (CIN)	Ken Singleton (BAL)
May	Art Howe (HOU)	Dwight Evans (BOS)
June	1981 Major League Baseball strike	
July	1981 Major League Baseball strike	
August	Mike Schmidt (PHI)	Cecil Cooper (MIL)
September	Gary Matthews (PHI)	Eddie Murray (BAL); Willie Wilson (KC)

==== Pitcher of the Month ====
Month	National League	American League
April	Fernando Valenzuela (LAD)	Matt Keough (OAK)
May	Charlie Lea (MON)	Mark Clear (BOS)
June	1981 Major League Baseball strike	
July	1981 Major League Baseball strike	
August	Rick Camp (ATL); Ed Whitson (SF)	Ron Guidry (NYY)
September	Tom Seaver (CIN)	Larry Gura (KC); Dennis Martínez (BAL)

=== Baseball Hall of Fame ===
- Bob Gibson
- Johnny Mize
- Rube Foster (executive)

== Home field attendance ==
Team name	Wins	%±	Home attendance	%±	Per game
Los Angeles Dodgers	63	−31.5%	2,381,292	−26.7%	42,523
Philadelphia Phillies	59	−35.2%	1,638,752	−38.2%	29,795
New York Yankees	59	−42.7%	1,614,353	−38.6%	31,654
Montreal Expos	60	−33.3%	1,534,564	−30.5%	27,403
California Angels	51	−21.5%	1,441,545	−37.3%	26,695
Houston Astros	61	−34.4%	1,321,282	−42.0%	25,907
Oakland Athletics	64	−22.9%	1,304,052	54.8%	23,287
Kansas City Royals	50	−48.5%	1,279,403	−44.1%	27,221
Detroit Tigers	60	−28.6%	1,149,144	−35.6%	20,894
Cincinnati Reds	66	−25.8%	1,093,730	−45.9%	20,254
Boston Red Sox	59	−28.9%	1,060,379	−45.8%	20,007
Baltimore Orioles	59	−41.0%	1,024,247	−43.0%	18,623
St. Louis Cardinals	59	−20.3%	1,010,247	−27.1%	19,061
Chicago White Sox	54	−22.9%	946,651	−21.1%	19,319
Milwaukee Brewers	62	−27.9%	874,292	−52.9%	17,843
Texas Rangers	57	−25.0%	850,076	−29.1%	15,180
Toronto Blue Jays	37	−44.8%	755,083	−46.1%	14,247
New York Mets	41	−38.8%	704,244	−40.9%	13,543
Cleveland Indians	52	−34.2%	661,395	−36.0%	12,248
Seattle Mariners	44	−25.4%	636,276	−23.9%	11,163
San Francisco Giants	56	−25.3%	632,274	−42.3%	11,930
Chicago Cubs	38	−40.6%	565,637	−53.1%	9,752
Pittsburgh Pirates	46	−44.6%	541,789	−67.1%	10,623
Atlanta Braves	50	−38.3%	535,418	−48.9%	10,708
San Diego Padres	41	−43.8%	519,161	−54.4%	9,439
Minnesota Twins	41	−46.8%	469,090	−39.0%	7,690

== Venues ==
San Diego Stadium, home of the San Diego Padres, was renamed to Jack Murphy Stadium after San Diego Union sportswriter, Jack Murphy, died of lung cancer on September 24, 1980.

The Minnesota Twins would play their last game at Metropolitan Stadium on September 30 against the Kansas City Royals, opening Hubert H. Humphrey Metrodome for the start of the 1982.

== Media ==
=== Television ===
Network	Day of week	Announcers
ABC	Monday nights Sunday afternoons	Keith Jackson, Howard Cosell, Don Drysdale, Al Michaels, Jim Palmer, Bob Uecker
NBC	Saturday afternoons	Joe Garagiola, Tony Kubek, Dick Enberg, Tom Seaver, Merle Harmon, Ron Luciano
USA	Thursday nights	Jim Woods, Nelson Briles, Monte Moore, Wes Parker

== See also ==
- 1981 in baseball (Events, Movies, Births, Deaths)
- 1981 Nippon Professional Baseball season
