= Charlie Lea =

French-American baseball player (1956-2011)

- Pitcher
- Born: December 25, 1956; Orléans, France
- Died: November 11, 2011 (aged 54); Collierville, Tennessee, U.S.
- Batted: Right Threw: Right

MLB debut
- June 12, 1980, for the Montreal Expos

Last MLB appearance
- October 1, 1988, for the Minnesota Twins

MLB statistics
- Win–loss record: 62–48
- Earned run average: 3.54
- Strikeouts: 535
- Stats at Baseball Reference

Teams
- Montreal Expos (1980–1984, 1987); Minnesota Twins (1988)

Career highlights and awards
- All-Star (1984); Pitched a no-hitter on May 10, 1981

Charles William Lea (December 25, 1956 – November 11, 2011) was an American professional baseball starting pitcher in Major League Baseball. From 1980 through 1988, Lea played for the Montreal Expos (1980–84, 1987) and Minnesota Twins (1988). He batted and threw right-handed.

== Career ==
Lea was drafted three times, by the New York Mets (1975), St. Louis Cardinals (1976) and Chicago White Sox (1977), but did not sign and decided to go on to Memphis State University. He signed with the Montreal Expos after being selected in the 1978 draft.

Lea played for the Double-A Memphis Chicks in the Southern League from 1978 to 1980 and was selected an All-Star in 1979 and 1980. After a 9–0 mark and a 0.84 ERA in his last season at Memphis, Lea was called to the majors and debuted with the Expos in the 1980 midseason. He finished his rookie season with a 7–5 record.

On May 10, 1981, Lea no-hit the San Francisco Giants 4-0 in the second game of a doubleheader at Olympic Stadium. He was one of only three Expos to throw a no-hitter, the others being Bill Stoneman, twice, in 1969 and 1972, and Dennis Martínez, who pitched a perfect game in 1991.

In 1982, Lea finished with a 12–10 mark and a 3.24 ERA. His most productive season came in 1983, when he collected career-highs in victories (16), strikeouts (137), and starts (33), posting a 3.12 ERA. Then, in 1984 Lea was 15–10, set personal marks in ERA (2.89) and innings pitched (224 1/3), and was selected as a National League All-Star where he was the starting and winning pitcher in the All-Star game.

Lea suffered arm and shoulder injuries and could not pitch at all in 1985 and 1986. He spent most of 1987 rehabilitating in the minor leagues and appeared in one inning for the Expos. A free agent before the 1988 season, he signed with the Minnesota Twins, finishing 7-7 with a 4.85 ERA.

In a seven-season career, Lea posted a 62–48 record with 535 strikeouts and a 3.54 ERA in 923 1/3 innings. He added 22 complete games and eight shutouts in 152 games pitched (144 as a starter).

Lea was inducted to the Tennessee Sports of Hall of Fame in 1999.

== Later life ==
Lea died on November 11, 2011, in Collierville, Tennessee, after an apparent heart attack at the age of 54.

== See also ==
- List of Major League Baseball no-hitters

Preceded by Jerry Reuss	No-hitter pitcher May 10, 1981	Succeeded by Len Barker
