= Harry Simmons (baseball) =

American baseball executive, writer and historian

- Born: September 29, 1907; New York City, New York
- Died: January 14, 1998 (aged 90); New Canaan, Connecticut
- Other name: Mr. Baseball
- Education: Columbia University
- Occupations: Baseball executive, writer, historian
- Notable work: So You Think You Know Baseball
- Baseball career

Member of the Canadian

Baseball Hall of Fame
- Induction: 2002

Harry Simmons (September 29, 1907 – January 14, 1998) was an American professional baseball executive, writer and historian. He worked in Minor League Baseball for the International League from 1946 until 1966, first in New York City then in Montreal. He then worked in Major League Baseball for the Office of the Commissioner of Baseball until his retirement in 1982. Simmons was nicknamed "Mr. Baseball" and is an inductee of the Canadian Baseball Hall of Fame.

== Biography ==
Simmons' early interests in baseball derived from the Sunday afternoon games he attended with his father. After graduating from Morris High School in The Bronx, he worked in several jobs while developing a deep interest in baseball history, rules, and statistics. By the 1930s, he was spending a lot of his free time in the New York Public Library researching old newspapers about the early accounts of matches. At that time, he developed a friendship with Ernest Lanigan, a baseball historian and Information Director of the International League.

During the 1930s, Simmons developed a deep interest in baseball statistics and history. He was the first to compile 19th century win-lost records for pitchers in the National League. The guides of that period had not published this information. He carefully checked each box score of each game listed in the newspapers of that era: Sporting Life and The Sporting News. The results were published over several issues of Baseball Magazine.

From 1940 to 1942, Simmons selected the top baseball performer of the day for the popular radio show "Fred Waring and his Pennsylvanians." While in the United States Army, he continued his research and while at Camp Pickett, Virginia, was able to work at the Library of Congress in Washington, where he compiled records from 1876, debuts of prominent players, batting records of pitchers, rare fielding gems and items for The Sporting News record book. He contributed original work to the top baseball writers of the day: J. G. Taylor Spink, Leonard Gettlson, Hy Turkin, S. C. Thompson, and Lee Allen. He studied journalism at Columbia University in New York on the G.I. Bill after leaving the army.

In 1951, Simmons was called as an expert witness to testify before a congressional committee on the history of the reserve clause. The Celler House Judiciary Committee probed monopoly influences in organized baseball. In 1965, he appeared in the CBS television show To Tell The Truth and managed to receive no votes when asked, "Will the real Mr. Simmons please stand up". In 1968, Simmons contributed a 26,710 word essay on the topic of baseball which was printed in the Encyclopædia Britannica for many years.

=== International League ===
Simmons joined the International League during the 1946 season. On his first day on the job, league president Frank Shaughnessy asked him to go to Baltimore to present Sherm Lollar with the league's Most Valuable Player Award for the 1945 season, when Lollar had a .364 batting average with 34 home runs. Simmons hopped on a train and in front of 45,000 fans made the presentation that afternoon. He indicated that he was extremely nervous speaking in front of a crowd that size. That year, Jackie Robinson joined the Montreal Royals, and Simmons became quite involved in handling the press in its hunger for stories about Robinson.

When Simmons started at the International League, he held conferences for the umpires of the league to discuss the rules and review calls which had been made. He soon realized that some of the umpires were of the opinion that they "don't have to know the right answer unless the managers do". He started to compile some of these odd plays which the umpires would ask him about, and in 1949, he submitted "a pack of these nutcrackers" to The Saturday Evening Post under the title "So You Think You Know Baseball". The series became very popular; one of the solutions brought 7,000 letters of protest to the magazine. Nearly all were actually plays, "though a few were the results of bad dreams". The series ran until 1961, and later was published in Baseball Digest. The series was published in book form, first in 1960, and sold 500,000 copies in many editions.

Over the years, Simmons gained more International League responsibilities in handling player trades, dealing with the press, scheduling the games, the hiring, firing and movement of the umpires, settling disputes among the clubs, handling the financial side of league operations, and staffing the office. During the late 1950s, Shaughnessy became frequently ill, and Simmons was essentially running the league by himself.

In early 1953, the league office was moved to Shaughnessy's home town of Montreal. Simmons quickly became a popular figure in Montreal baseball circles and gave many speeches to local community groups. He made many close friends among the sports writers and sport figures in both Montreal and Toronto. He moved his family north in 1954 to settle in the suburb of Cartierville, Quebec. The family retained this residence until 1995.

One of Simmons' tasks at the International League was to develop the league schedule. In March 1953, when the Boston Braves moved to Milwaukee, National League president Warren Giles called on Simmons for some quick schedule changes. The next year found Simmons developing both the American League and National League schedules. He was the major league schedule maker from then until 1982, when the required travel started to take its toll. Simmons also completed the schedules for numerous minor leagues, the Canadian Football League, soccer leagues, and international hockey tournaments.

After the 1960 season, when the Montreal Royals folded (becoming the Syracuse Chiefs) and Shaughnessy retired, the league offices were moved back to New York City. Simmons received consideration to succeed Shaughnessy, but the position went to Tommy Richardson, then president of the Eastern League. Simmons, who remained with the International League through the 1965 season, decided to keep his residence in Montreal; he regularly spent three days a week in Montreal until retiring from his subsequent role with Major League Baseball.

=== Commissioner's Office ===
In late January 1966, Simmons resigned from the International League and took a role in the Office of the Commissioner of Baseball. His official duties included supervision of club player contracts, co-ordination of retirement plans for both leagues, player service and pension records. He frequently was called upon for advice from the Commissioner and wrote speeches for the many functions attended by commissioners William Eckert and Bowie Kuhn. He acted as a general consultant to club owners and general managers who needed advice. He also served on the Major League Rules Committee for many years, where he suggested changes and wrote new rules.

Since Simmons had many friends in the baseball circles in Montreal, and knew everyone of importance in the game, it was only natural that he was called upon for assistance when the city was ready for a major league franchise, the Montreal Expos. He directed Gerry Snyder of the mayor's office on how to go about getting the franchise and recommended the hiring of Jim Fanning and John McHale to run the club.

Jim Fanning, former general manager of the Expos, wrote:

"During Mr. Simmons time as a baseball executive every Major League owner and executive knew him on a first name basis. He not only was a keen advisor to the commissioners he worked for, but was a counsel and advisor to Major League Executives as well. Mr. Simmons was unheralded—his picture never made the cover of The Sporting News—but I had an office next to his when I started the Major League Scouting Bureau, and I witnessed this man's contribution day after day. His contributions were an equal to any who graced the cover of a sports magazine."

== Death and legacy ==
In 1979, Simmons was awarded the "King of Baseball" title at the annual baseball Winter Meetings, held in Toronto. This prestigious award is given annually to an individual who has made a major contribution to Major League baseball.

In 1990, Simmons was awarded the SABR Salute, which is given to a member whose research has contributed significantly to baseball knowledge.

Simmons died at a care center in New Canaan, Connecticut, in January 1998 at age 90.

in 2007, Simmons was elected to the International Jewish Sports Hall of Fame in Israel.

=== Canadian Baseball Hall of Fame ===
In 2002, Simmons was inducted into the Canadian Baseball Hall of Fame.

In the more than 50 years that he was involved in baseball, Simmons collected thousands of items related to the development of the game from its earliest times. These included his correspondence with people involved in every level of the game; memos, letters, and speeches from the commissioners office from the 1920s to the 1980s; notes and memos from his days as the major league schedule maker, letters from fans of his "So You Think You Know Baseball" series; articles from the International League; a significant collection of baseball memorabilia, and a major collection of baseball publications and books. The collection was donated in 1998 to the Canadian Baseball Hall of Fame by his son, David, who is a resident of Toronto. It has been called one of baseball's most eclectic, exciting and diverse collections. The collection is housed in the Harry Simmons Memorial Library, which was opened on April 25, 2019.
