= Canadian Baseball Hall of Fame =

Canadian Baseball Hall of Fame and Museum
- Temple de la renommée du baseball canadien

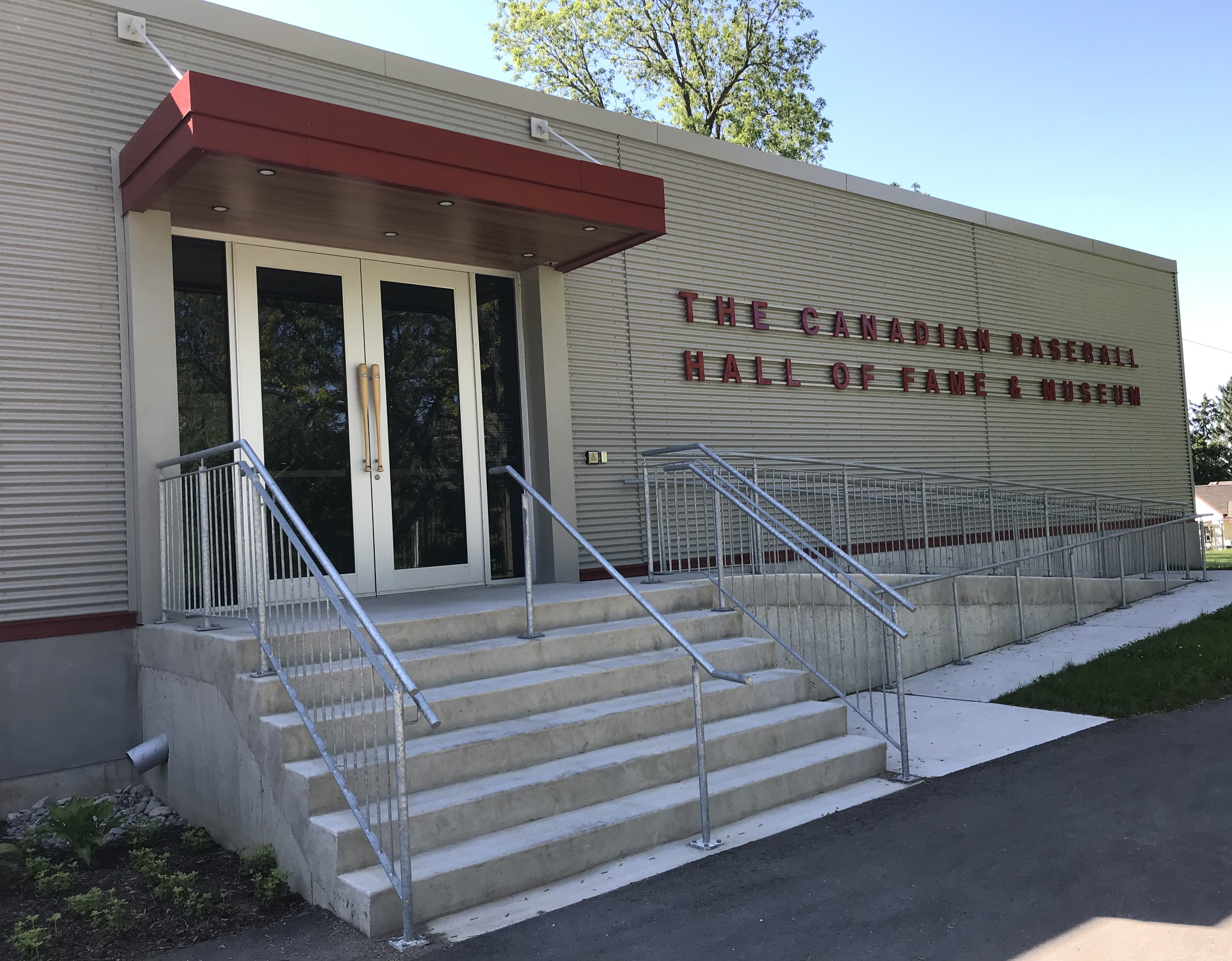
- Main entrance to Museum
- Established: 1982
- Location: 386 Church Street South; St. Marys, Ontario, Canada
- Coordinates: 43.251435°N 81.143845°W
- Type: Sports museum
- Director: Scott Crawford
- Chairperson: Jeremy Diamond
- Curator: Lindsay Earle
- Website: baseballhalloffame.ca

The Canadian Baseball Hall of Fame and Museum (French: Temple de la renommée du baseball canadien) is a museum located in St. Marys, Ontario, Canada. The museum commemorates the great players, teams, and events from Canadian baseball history.

== History ==
The museum was founded in November 1982 in Toronto at Exhibition Place and later moved to Ontario Place theme park. In August 1994, it was awarded to St. Marys, Ontario, and in June 1998 the doors officially opened in St. Marys. On November 23, 2017, construction began on a 2,500-square-foot (230 m^{2}) expansion to the museum, including a secure archive facility, library, new entrance, and auditorium/exhibition space. The re-designed museum opened to the public on April 27, 2019.

The Hall of Fame and Museum is dedicated to preserving Canada's baseball heritage which dates back to June 4, 1838, when a game which very closely resembled today's game of baseball was played in Beachville, Ontario. University of Western Ontario professor Bob Barney wrote the historical study which advocated for relocating the hall of fame from Toronto to St. Marys, Ontario, and extensively researched and validated the Beachville game in 1838.

In 2021, Helen Callaghan, who had played in the All-American Girls Professional Baseball League (AAGPBL), became the first woman individually inducted to the Canadian Baseball Hall of Fame; the Hall had previously inducted, as a group in 1998, all Canadian women who played in the AAGPBL.

In early 2022, the Hall of Fame was criticized for not inducting the Chatham Coloured All-Stars, the first team of Black Canadians to win an Ontario Baseball Association title.

== Awards ==
Since opening, over 160 individual members have been inducted into the hall. This includes professional and amateur players, builders, administrators, umpires, broadcasters, writers, and honorary members who have helped popularize the sport in Canada. Several teams or groups have also been inducted. Multiple members of the hall have also been inducted into the National Baseball Hall of Fame and Museum in Cooperstown, New York, as players, managers, or executives. Several other inductees have been recipients of the Ford C. Frick Award or BBWAA Career Excellence Award.

In addition, the Canadian Baseball Hall of Fame awards the Tip O'Neill Award annually to the Canadian baseball player "judged to have excelled in individual achievement and team contribution while adhering to the highest ideals of the game of baseball" and the Jack Graney Award for Lifetime Media Achievement.

== Facilities ==
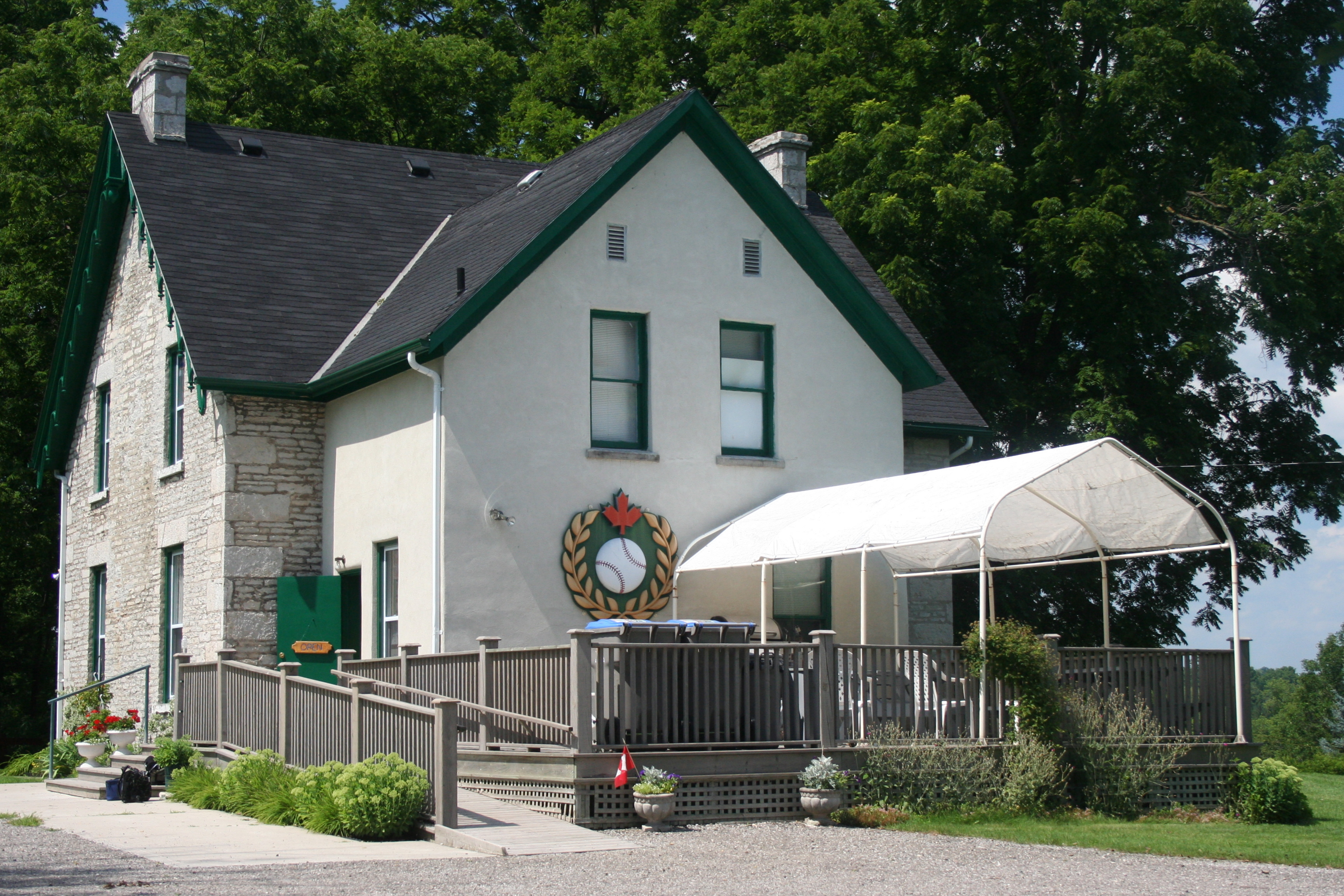
Original building in St. Marys before 2018 addition

The 32-acre (13 ha) facility in St. Marys also includes four baseball fields designed by landscape architect Art Lierman of London, Ontario.

== Rules for nominations ==
1. A player must be retired for at least three years.
2. Must receive 75 percent of the vote to be inducted.
3. If the person is not Canadian he must have done something significant with respect to baseball in Canada.
4. The person nominated will stay on the ballot for nine years as long as he receives a minimum of one vote every two years.
5. All information must be in by December 1 of the year to be eligible for the following year.

== Inductees ==
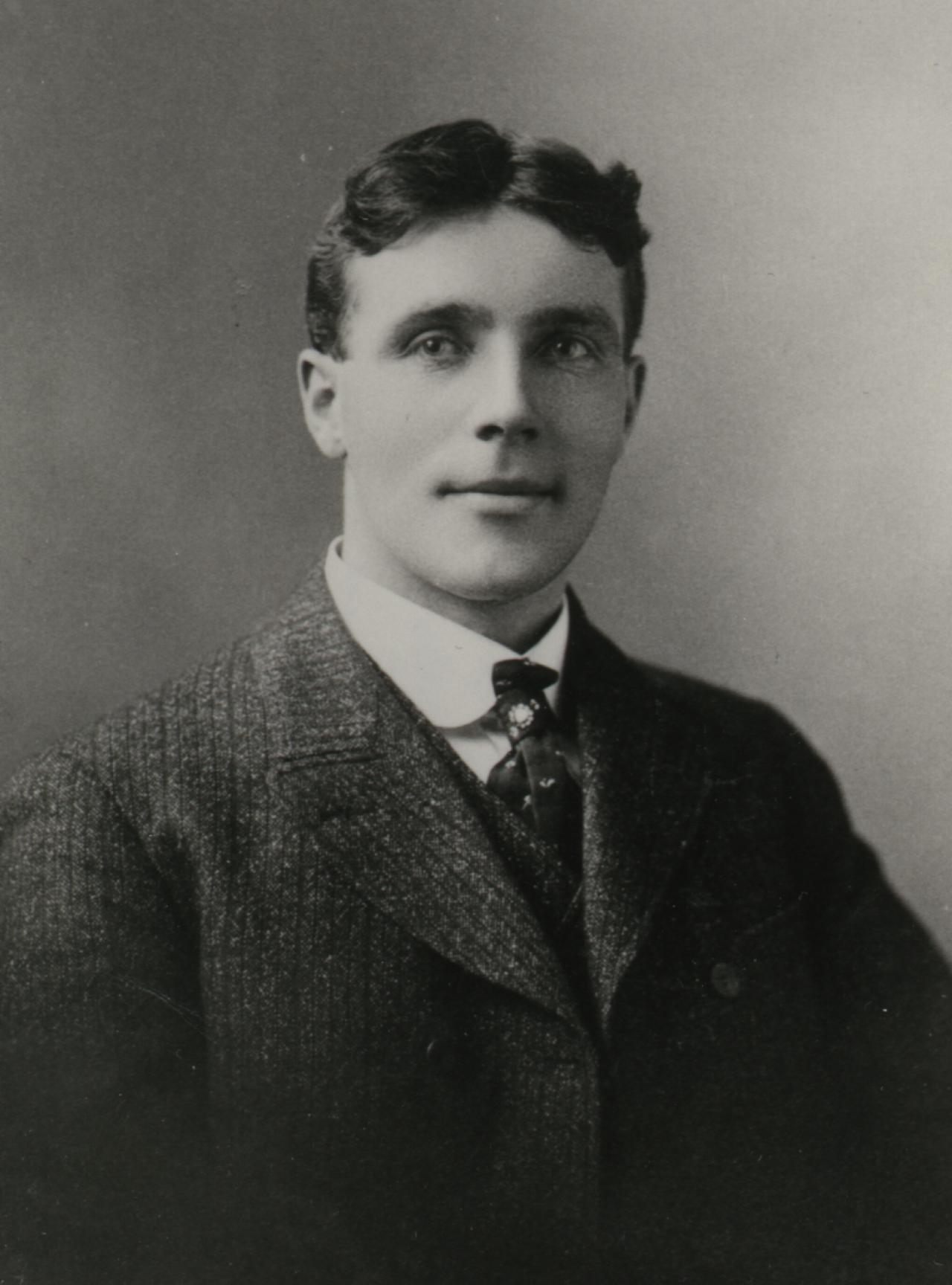
Tip O'Neill was one of the first players inducted to the Canadian Baseball Hall of Fame.

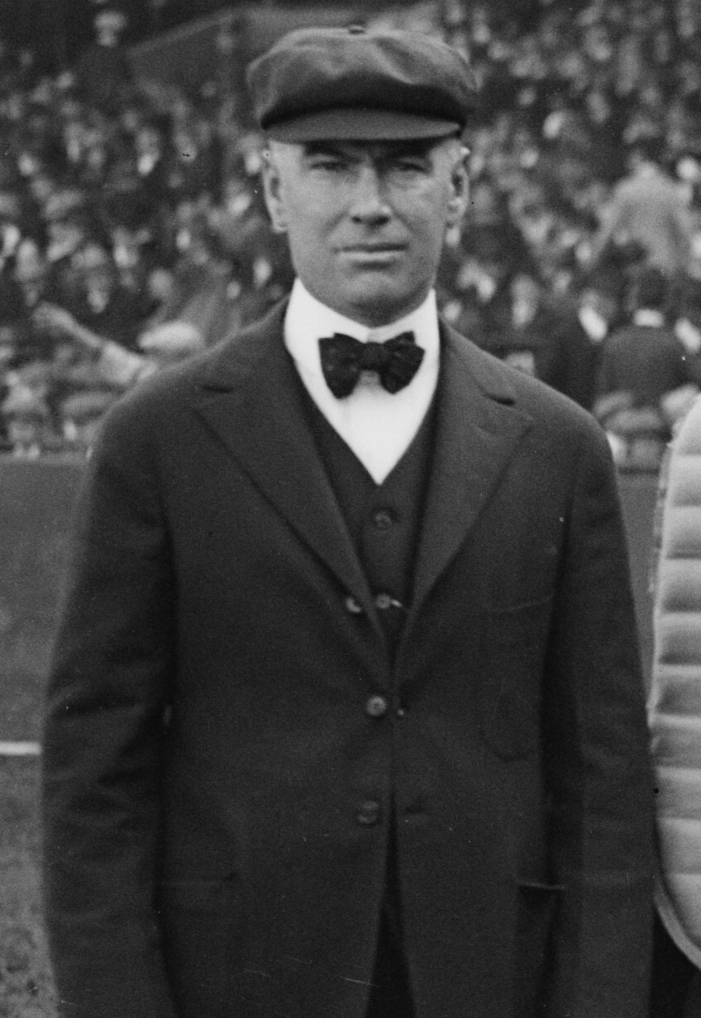
Umpire Ernie Quigley was inducted in 2021.

†	Member of the National Baseball Hall of Fame in Cooperstown, New York (includes Ford C. Frick Award and BBWAA Career Excellence Award recipients)

=== Individuals ===
Name	Role(s)	Born			Year inducted
Name	Role(s)	City	Province or state	Country	Year inducted
Bob Addy	Player	Port Hope	Ontario	Canada	2021
Roberto Alomar ^{†}	Player	Ponce	—	Puerto Rico	2010
Felipe Alou	Manager	Haina	—	Dominican Republic	2015
Sparky Anderson ^{†}	Manager	Bridgewater	South Dakota	United States	2007
Jimmy Archer	Player	Dublin	—	Ireland	1990
Amanda Asay	Player	Prince George	British Columbia	Canada	2025
Gord Ash	Executive	Toronto	Ontario	Canada	2019
Jim Baba	Executive	Moose Jaw	Saskatchewan	Canada	2026
Nat Bailey	Builder	Saint Paul	Minnesota	United States	2013
Jesse Barfield	Player	Joliet	Illinois	United States	2023
José Bautista	Player	Santo Domingo	—	Dominican Republic	2025
Jason Bay	Player	Trail	British Columbia	Canada	2019
Paul Beeston	Builder	Welland	Ontario	Canada	2002
Érik Bédard	Player	Navan	Ontario	Canada	2025
Richard Bélec	Builder	Montreal	Quebec	Canada	2003
George Bell	Player	San Pedro de Macorís	—	Dominican Republic	2013
Reno Bertoia	Player	San Vito al Tagliamento	—	Italy	1988
Andy Bilesky	Builder	Trail	British Columbia	Canada	1984
Howard Birnie	Executive	Toronto	Ontario	Canada	2024
Denis Boucher	Player	Montreal	Quebec	Canada	2023
Ted Bowsfield	Player	Vernon	British Columbia	Canada	1988
Charles Bronfman	Builder	Montreal	Quebec	Canada	1984
Bob Brown	Builder	Scranton	Pennsylvania	United States	1989
Tom Burgess	Player	London	Ontario	Canada	1992
Carmen Bush	Builder	Toronto	Ontario	Canada	1985
James F. Cairns	Executive	Lawrenceville	Quebec	Canada	2021
Helen Callaghan	Player	Vancouver	British Columbia	Canada	2021
Gary Carter ^{†}	Player	Culver City	California	United States	2001
Joe Carter	Player	Oklahoma City	Oklahoma	United States	2003
Ray Carter	Executive	Nanaimo	British Columbia	Canada	2017
Tom Cheek ^{†}	Broadcaster	Pensacola	Florida	United States	2013
Stubby Clapp	Player, Coach	Windsor	Ontario	Canada	2026
Nig Clarke	Player	Amherstburg	Ontario	Canada	1996
Jimmy Claxton	Player	Wellington	British Columbia	Canada	2021
Reggie Cleveland	Player	Swift Current	Saskatchewan	Canada	1986
Frank Colman	Player	London	Ontario	Canada	1999
Murray Cook	Player, GM, Scout	Sackville	New Brunswick	Canada	2014
Jack Kent Cooke	Builder	Hamilton	Ontario	Canada	1985
Rhéal Cormier	Player	Moncton	New Brunswick	Canada	2012
Ronald Cullen	Builder	Toronto	Ontario	Canada	1996
Charlie Culver	Player	Buffalo	New York	United States	2021
Andre Dawson ^{†}	Player	Miami	Florida	United States	2004
Carlos Delgado	Player	Aguadilla	—	Puerto Rico	2015
Ryan Dempster	Player	Gibsons	British Columbia	Canada	2019
Jacques Doucet	Broadcaster	Montreal	Quebec	Canada	2020
John Ducey	Builder, Umpire	Buffalo	New York	United States	1983
Rob Ducey	Player	Toronto	Ontario	Canada	2013
Bob Elliott ^{†}	Writer	Kingston	Ontario	Canada	2015
Bob Emslie	Player, Umpire	Guelph	Ontario	Canada	1986
Jim Fanning	Builder	Chicago	Illinois	United States	2000
Tony Fernández	Player	San Pedro de Macorís	—	Dominican Republic	2008
Russ Ford	Player	Brandon	Manitoba	Canada	1987
Dick Fowler	Player	Toronto	Ontario	Canada	1985
Jeff Francis	Player	Vancouver	British Columbia	Canada	2022
Hippo Galloway	Player	Buffalo	New York	United States	2021
Cito Gaston	Manager	San Antonio	Texas	United States	2002
George Gibson	Player	London	Ontario	Canada	1987
Pat Gillick ^{†}	Builder, GM	Chico	California	United States	1997
Roland Gladu	Player	Montreal	Quebec	Canada	2021
Paul Godfrey	Executive	Toronto	Ontario	Canada	2024
Jack Graney ^{†}	Player, Broadcaster	St. Thomas	Ontario	Canada	1984
Calvin Griffith	Owner	Montreal	Quebec	Canada	2010
Vladimir Guerrero ^{†}	Player	Nizao	—	Dominican Republic	2017
John Haar	Builder, Coach	Vancouver	British Columbia	Canada	2007
Roy Halladay ^{†}	Player	Denver	Colorado	United States	2017
Greg Hamilton	Coach, Manager, Executive	Toronto	Ontario	Canada	2025
Vern Handrahan	Player	Charlottetown	Prince Edward Island	Canada	2021
Rich Harden	Player	Victoria	British Columbia	Canada	2023
Peter Hardy	Builder	London	Ontario	Canada	2004
Bill Harris	Player	Duguayville	New Brunswick	Canada	2008
Ron Hayter	Builder	Regina	Saskatchewan	Canada	2006
Jeff Heath	Player	Fort William	Ontario	Canada	1988
Rod Heisler	Player	Moose Jaw	Saskatchewan	Canada	2024
Tom Henke	Player	Kansas City	Missouri	United States	2011
Pat Hentgen	Player	Detroit	Michigan	United States	2016
John Hiller	Player	Toronto	Ontario	Canada	1985
Doug Hudlin	Umpire	Victoria	British Columbia	Canada	2017
William Humber	Historian	Toronto	Ontario	Canada	2018
Arthur Irwin	Player	Toronto	Ontario	Canada	1989
Ferguson Jenkins ^{†}	Player	Chatham	Ontario	Canada	1987
Oscar Judd	Player	Rebecca	Ontario	Canada	1986
Jimmy Key	Player	Huntsville	Alabama	United States	2024
Corey Koskie	Player	Anola	Manitoba	Canada	2015
Tony Kubek ^{†}	Player, Broadcaster	Milwaukee	Wisconsin	United States	2016
Joseph Lannin	Builder	Lac-Beauport	Quebec	Canada	2004
Tommy Lasorda ^{†}	Player, Manager	Norristown	Pennsylvania	United States	2006
George Lee	Builder	Toronto	Ontario	Canada	1998
Phil Marchildon	Player	Penetanguishene	Ontario	Canada	1983
Russell Martin	Player	East York	Ontario	Canada	2024
Dennis Martínez	Player	Granada	—	Nicaragua	2016
Pedro Martínez ^{†}	Player	Manoguayabo	—	Dominican Republic	2018
Bobby Mattick	Builder	Sioux City	Iowa	United States	1999
Kirk McCaskill	Player	Kapuskasing	Ontario	Canada	2003
Don McDougall	Builder	Charlottetown	Prince Edward Island	Canada	2002
John McHale	Builder	Detroit	Michigan	United States	1997
Manny McIntyre	Player	Devon	New Brunswick	Canada	2021
Dave McKay	Player, Coach	Vancouver	British Columbia	Canada	2001
Jim McKean	Umpire	Montreal	Quebec	Canada	2004
Larry McLean	Player	Fredericton	New Brunswick	Canada	2006
Doug Melvin	Builder	Chatham	Ontario	Canada	2012
Roy Miller	Player	Chatham	Ontario	Canada	2009
Justin Morneau	Player	New Westminster	British Columbia	Canada	2020
Lloyd Moseby	Player	Portland	Arkansas	United States	2018
Rocky Nelson	Player	Portsmouth	Ohio	United States	1987
Arlene Noga	Player	Ogema	Saskatchewan	Canada	2025
Wayne Norton	Player	Winnipeg	Manitoba	Canada	2016
John Olerud	Player	Seattle	Washington	United States	2020
Tip O'Neill	Player	Springfield	Ontario	Canada	1983
Frank O'Rourke	Player	Hamilton	Ontario	Canada	1996
Joe Page	Executive	London	—	England	2021
Lester B. Pearson	Builder	Toronto	Ontario	Canada	1983
Bill Phillips	Player	Saint John	New Brunswick	Canada	2010
Ron Piché	Player	Verdun	Quebec	Canada	1988
Bob Prentice	Builder	Toronto	Ontario	Canada	1986
Kate Psota	Player	Burlington	Ontario	Canada	2026
Terry Puhl	Player	Melville	Saskatchewan	Canada	1995
Paul Quantrill	Player	London	Ontario	Canada	2010
Ernest C. Quigley	Umpire	Newcastle	New Brunswick	Canada	2021
Hector Racine	Executive	La Prairie	Quebec	Canada	2021
Tim Raines ^{†}	Player	Sanford	Florida	United States	2013
Jimmy Rattlesnake	Player	Hobbema	Alberta	Canada	2021
Claude Raymond	Player, Broadcaster	Saint-Jean-sur-Richelieu	Quebec	Canada	1984
Jim Ridley	Player, Coach, Scout	Toronto	Ontario	Canada	2014
Sherry Robertson	Player	Montreal	Quebec	Canada	2007
Jackie Robinson ^{†}	Player	Cairo	Georgia	United States	1991
Steve Rogers	Player	Jefferson City	Missouri	United States	2005
Ron Roncetti	Builder	Rome	—	Italy	1998
Goody Rosen	Player	Toronto	Ontario	Canada	1984
Allan Roth	Statistician	Montreal	Quebec	Canada	2010
Jean-Pierre Roy	Player	Montreal	Quebec	Canada	2021
Paul Runge	Umpire	St. Catharines	Ontario	Canada	2026
Gladwyn Scott	Administration	Hamiota	Manitoba	Canada	2008
George Selkirk	Player	Huntsville	Ontario	Canada	1983
Frank Shaughnessy	Player, Builder	Amboy	Illinois	United States	1983
Dave Shury	Builder	Wilkie	Saskatchewan	Canada	2002
William Shuttleworth	Player, Executive	Brantford	Ontario	Canada	2016
Harry Simmons	Builder	New York City	New York	United States	2002
Allan Simpson	Writer	Kelowna	British Columbia	Canada	2011
Bill Slack	Coach, Manager	Petrolia	Ontario	Canada	2002
George Sleeman	Builder	Niagara-on-the-Lake	Ontario	Canada	1999
Pop Smith	Player	Digby	Nova Scotia	Canada	2005
Gerry Snyder	Owner	Montreal	Quebec	Canada	2025
Bernie Soulliere	Builder	Windsor	Ontario	Canada	2009
Matt Stairs	Player	Saint John	New Brunswick	Canada	2015
Howard Starkman	Executive	Toronto	Ontario	Canada	2016
Rusty Staub	Player	New Orleans	Louisiana	United States	2012
Ron Stead	Player	London	Ontario	Canada	2006
Ashley Stephenson	Player	Mississauga	Ontario	Canada	2024
Dave Stieb	Player	Santa Ana	California	United States	2005
Bill Stoneman	Player, Executive	Oak Park	Illinois	United States	2026
Ron Taylor	Player	Toronto	Ontario	Canada	1985
Fred Thomas	Player	Windsor	Ontario	Canada	2021
Rob Thomson	Coach	Sarnia	Ontario	Canada	2019
Dave Van Horne ^{†}	Broadcaster	Easton	Pennsylvania	United States	2014
Larry Walker ^{†}	Player	Maple Ridge	British Columbia	Canada	2009
Tim Wallach	Player	Huntington Park	California	United States	2014
Duane Ward	Player	Los Ojos	New Mexico	United States	2020
Pete Ward	Player	Montreal	Quebec	Canada	1991
Devon White	Player	Kingston	—	Jamaica	2026
Ernie Whitt	Player	Detroit	Michigan	United States	2009
Peter Widdrington	Executive	Toronto	Ontario	Canada	2008
Jimmy Williams	Player, Coach	Toronto	Ontario	Canada	1991
George Wood	Player	Pownal	Prince Edward Island	Canada	2011
Roy Yamamura	Manager	Vancouver	British Columbia	Canada	2021
Harold Younker	Trainer	Auburn	Washington	United States	2005
Joe Wiwchar	Coach, Executive	Winnipeg	Manitoba	Canada	2023

=== Groups ===
Name	Year(s) honored	Location	Year inducted
Canadian-born AAGPBL players	1943–1954	Canada	1998
Asahi baseball team	1914–1941	Vancouver, British Columbia	2003
Beachville & Zorra amateur teams	1838	Ontario	1988
London Tecumsehs	1877	London, Ontario	2021
National Youth Team (1991 WJC)	1991	Brandon, Manitoba	1992
National Baseball Team (PA 2011)	2011	Lagos de Moreno, Mexico	2012
National Baseball Team (PA 2015)	2015	Ajax, Ontario	2017

== See also ==
- History of baseball outside the United States#Canada
- London Tecumsehs#Early baseball in Canada
- Category:Baseball in Canada
- Baseball awards#Canada
