= William Shuttleworth =

Canadian baseball player and executive (1834–1903)

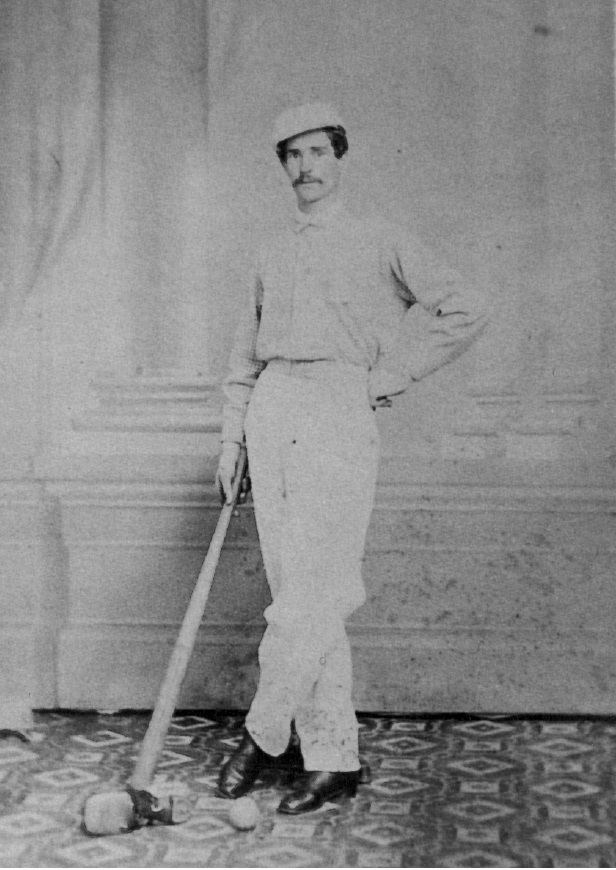
- Catcher
- Born: 1834; Brantford, Upper Canada
- Died: March 3, 1903 (aged 68–69); Geneva, New York

Teams
- Young Canadians of Hamilton (1854); Maple Leaf (1861)

Career highlights and awards
- Club president (Young Canadians); Club president (Maple Leaf); Vice-president of Canadian Base Ball Association

Member of the Canadian

Baseball Hall of Fame
- Induction: June 18, 2016

William Shuttleworth (1834 – March 3, 1903) was a Canadian baseball player and executive. He helped to develop the Young Canadians of Hamilton, the first known organized Canadian baseball team, in 1854, and was the club's president by 1860. Shuttleworth held the same role for the Maple Leaf club, and was vice-president of the Canadian Base Ball Association. Along with his executive roles and an extended playing career, he was an umpire in the 1860s. Shuttleworth has been inducted into Canada's Sports Hall of Fame and the Canadian Baseball Hall of Fame.

== Biography ==
=== Early life and Young Canadians ===
Canada's Sports Hall of Fame and the Canadian Baseball Hall of Fame list Shuttleworth's birth year as 1834, and the latter states that Brantford, Ontario was his birthplace. He was raised there, and in 1851 he resided in Hamilton. His brother James, a shoemaker, lived in the same city during at least part of the 1850s.

A version of a "baseball-type game" was played in Canada as early as 1838. Baseball later became popular in the Southern Ontario region. Canadian baseball historian William Humber considers it likely, though not certain, that Shuttleworth played an informal variety of the sport in his childhood. In April 1854, the first known organized baseball club in Canada was formed. The team was the Young Canadians of Hamilton, and was one of several started in the 1850s in Ontario. According to the Canadian Encyclopedia, Shuttleworth "was instrumental in its development." The team included men who worked various jobs in Hamilton, including clerks, Shuttleworth's profession. Early games in Ontario were primarily played under Massachusetts rules, with what author Brian Martin calls "some Canadian wrinkles." There were typically 11 players per team in these games, with the overhand pitching style allowed, a change from New York rules of the time. In addition, an entire playing roster had to make outs before a team lost its turn at bat in an inning. On May 24, 1859, the Young Canadians played a game against another club from Hamilton, Young America, under New York rules, which mandated nine-person teams. Shuttleworth did not play, and was resistant to changes from the style of play that had prevailed in Canada.

In 1860, Shuttleworth became the president of the Young Canadians. The club participated in two of the earliest international baseball contests in 1860. Their opponent in both games was Buffalo, New York's Niagaras; a team from that city had previously played against another club from Hamilton, the Burlingtons. The Young Canadians team lost 87–13 in the first game and 45–13 in the second. When playing for his club, Shuttleworth was a catcher and served as the leadoff hitter.

=== Maple Leaf ===
Another Hamilton-based team was founded in 1861, called "Maple Leaf"; Humber considers it a probable successor to the Young Canadians. In one July 30 game against fellow Hamilton club Burlington, Shuttleworth played at the catcher position, receiving praise for his play. Just over a month later, Maple Leaf faced the Young Canadians of Woodstock, a team that included James Shuttleworth, who was also director for the club. His team defeated William Shuttleworth's Maple Leaf 24–22 after scoring three runs in the ninth inning.

Shuttleworth married Matilda White in 1862. By that time, he had been named president of the Maple Leaf club, which played three further games against the Woodstock side between 1862 and 1864, losing each time. The Canadian Base Ball Association was founded in 1864, with Shuttleworth as its first vice-president; By 1865, Shuttleworth was joined by his brother James on Maple Leaf, and won a vote to remain the team's president. In one June 1865 game against West Flamboro, he scored six runs and was described as "particularly agile on the occasion" as Maple Leaf won 34–11. The Shuttleworth brothers each played in the club's victories against Maple Leaf of Guelph, Niagara, the Newcastle Beaver, and Ingorsoll before a game with the Woodstock team was called off because of a dispute over which baseball to use. In 1866, the start of Maple Leaf's season was delayed, as Shuttleworth and at least two other players had joined the Thirteenth Battalion and were defending Hamilton during the Fenian raids. On August 9, he was injured during a game against the Beaver and had to leave an eventual 75–44 loss in the third inning. He returned to the team by mid-August, scoring three runs in a win against Ingersoll.

In 1867, Shuttleworth served as a Color-Sargeant in the Thirteenth Battalion, and participated in the World's Base Ball Tournament, an event in Detroit attended by over 20 teams. Maple Leaf placed third and was awarded a gold-plated ball as a trophy. In addition to his duties with Young Canadians/Maple Leaf, Shuttleworth worked as an umpire in some 1860s games. One of these was the 1868 Canadian baseball championship game between the Young Canadians of Woodstock and Maple Leaf of Guelph. Behind a 12-run third inning, the Young Canadians prevailed to claim the title. In 1869, he continued to play for Maple Leaf; James Shuttleworth died that year. William remained president of Maple Leaf in 1870 and 1871, although there are no known records of him playing by this time. He did take part in an 1875 "old-timers" game in Hamilton, likely the first such contest in Canada.

=== Later life ===
Shuttleworth is not listed as an executive for the 1872 season. By this time, he and Matilda had four children, a fifth was born in 1874, before Matilda died on October 7, 1881. In the mid-1880s, Shuttleworth lived in a boarding house; at one point, he was employed by furniture maker James Reid. He moved to the United States in 1893 and resided in Geneva, New York; he worked as an upholsterer according to the 1900 U.S. Census. Shuttleworth died in Geneva on March 3, 1903; his body was buried in Hamilton.

=== Legacy ===
A summary of Shuttleworth's activities appeared in 1923's Herald Scrapbook; it asked, "Do the baseball enthusiasts of 1923 ever talk of/about Billy Shuttleworth?" His contribution to baseball in Canada was not recalled for many years afterward. The Hamilton Spectator's Steve Milton attributed this to a quick decline in Hamilton baseball, as the city's clubs were overtaken by western Canadian teams. In 1979, historian Bill Hutton found his name inside a book on Canadian labour and searched for further information; he later said, "I think at first people thought I made him up." Canada's Sports Hall of Fame inducted Shuttleworth in 2015, as part of a one-time "Sports Legends Class" for pre-1955 figures honoured for the Hall's 60th anniversary. The following year, the Canadian Baseball Hall of Fame selected him for induction. In 2016, Shuttleworth became a member of the Hamilton Sports Hall of Fame.

Shuttleworth has received recognition as the "Father of Canadian Baseball"; the Canadian Baseball Hall of Fame considers him "a driving force behind the sport in Canada." Humber credits Shuttleworth for "taking the game from its informal roots and formalizing it into an organized sport for young men with a team structure and eventually a well-developed network of teams" in the Hamilton area.

== Bibliography ==
- Humber, William (Spring 2013). "William Shuttleworth: The Father of Canadian Baseball". Base Ball: A Journal of the Early Game. 7 (1): 100–125. doi:10.3172/BB.7.100. ISBN 978-0-7864-7901-6. OCLC 872683879.
- Jensen, Chris (2012). Baseball State by State: Major and Negro League Players, Ballparks, Museums and Historical Sites. McFarland & Company. ISBN 978-0-7864-6895-9.
- Marsh, James H. (1999). The Canadian Encyclopedia. McClelland & Stewart. ISBN 978-0-7710-2099-5.
- Martin, Brian (2015). The Tecumsehs of the International Association: Canada's First Major League Baseball Champions. McFarland & Company. ISBN 978-1-4766-1869-2. (Unpaginated version consulted online via Google Books.)
