= Fred Thomas (athlete) =

Canadian football, baseball, and basketball player

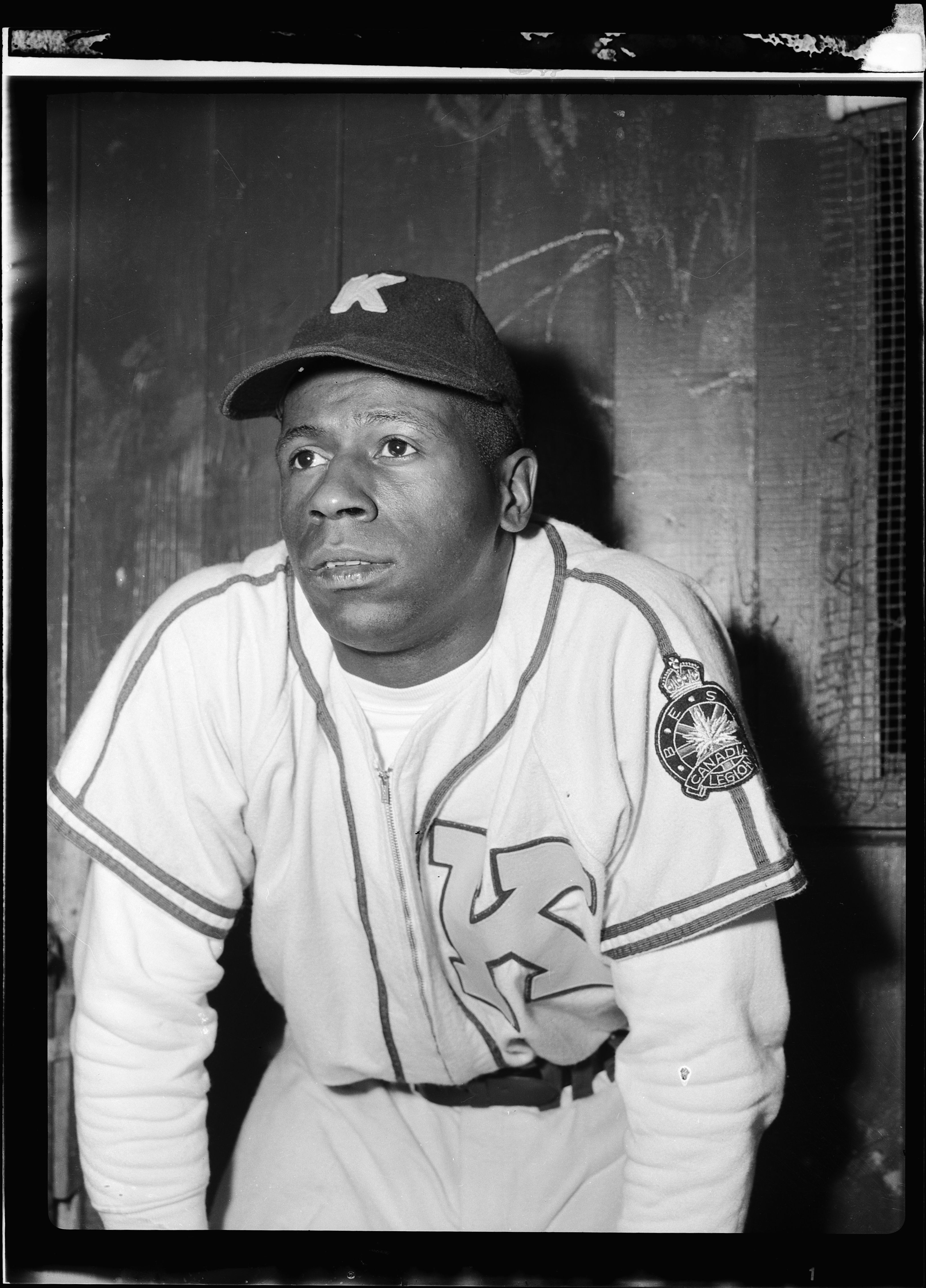
- Thomas in a baseball dugout wearing a Kitchener Panthers uniform

Personal information
- Born: December 26, 1923 Windsor, Ontario, Canada
- Died: May 20, 1981 (aged 57) Toronto, Ontario, Canada
- Resting place: Windsor, Ontario
- Education: Assumption College, BA 1949
- Height: 6 ft 3 in (191 cm)
- Weight: 175 lb (79 kg)
- Baseball career
- Outfielder
- Bats: Left Throws: Unknown

Member of the Canadian

Baseball Hall of Fame
- Induction: 2021

Sport
- Sport: Basketball, Baseball, Football

Fred S. Thomas (December 26, 1923 – May 20, 1981) was a Canadian multi-sport professional athlete. He played on semi-professional or professional teams in basketball, baseball, and Canadian football. He was a standout on his college basketball team and is known as one of Canada's finest basketball players. A 2019 profile by TVOntario described Thomas as "the greatest Canadian athlete you've never heard of". He would likely have been more well-known had Black people not been denied opportunities to compete in major professional sports leagues in the 1940s and 1950s.

== Early life and education ==
Thomas grew up in Windsor, Ontario, Canada. He was a fifth-generation Canadian whose ancestry can be traced to enslaved Africans fleeing North Carolina and Barbadian immigrants. His parents were Charles Fred Thomas and Edith May Thomas. He had seven siblings; one brother and six sisters. (Note: One source says five sisters) He was the second oldest and his athletic prowess let him excel at many sports. He attended high school at the J. C. Patterson Collegiate Institute in Windsor, beginning in the late 1930s. He was a football and track star there, competing in hurdles, high jump, sprints, long jump and triple jump. He also led the basketball team to a provincial championship, beating Ottawa Glebe Collegiate in Toronto for the All-Ontario Basketball Title.

He graduated in 1943 and then enlisted in the Royal Canadian Air Force. He earned his wings shortly before the end of World War II. After being discharged from the service, he enrolled at Assumption College, federated with the University of Windsor, where he became known as one of the country's best basketball players. He played four years under coach Stanley Nantais.

In 1945, the Harlem Globetrotters, who were "widely considered the best team in the world", were defeated by the Assumption basketball team 49–45. A 1952 newspaper article said Thomas "was a constant thorn in the side of his visitors" and "His terrific speed enabling him to leap high into the air after burning down the floor to break up passing plays. His performance was amazing and the most amazed were the confused Globetrotters."

In 1949, his senior year, he led the team to the Ontario Senior Men's Finals where they defeated Toronto Central by 90–56, 47 of which he scored himself. At the time, the Toronto Globe and Mail called him the "best Negro athlete in Canada". During Thomas's college four-year basketball career (1945–1949), he scored 2,059 points, the third-highest on the NCAA scoring list at the time of his graduation. This includes a record 639 points in the 1948–49 season. His time at Assumption was known as the "Thomistic Era". The 1952 newspaper article summarized his college basketball career by saying "There was probably never a Canadian basketball player who so dominated the key area and was so deadly with the hook shot as Fred. He played the game with the grace of a swan and the agility of a gazelle."

== Baseball ==
Outside of college, Thomas turned to baseball. He played with the Negro league's Cincinnati Crescents in 1946, the Detroit Senators in 1947, and the Farnham Pirates in 1948 in the Quebec Provincial League. Over 58 games with Farnham, he was batting .351 which caught the attention of Major League Baseball (MLB) scouts. He was selected by the organization's Cleveland Indians to join the Wilkes-Barre Barons farm-team who played in the Eastern League, where he took the field for the first time in a July 4, 1948, doubleheader. This appearance was the first by a Black player in the league, and he had two singles, and RBI, and a stolen base in the second game. He broke the colour barrier in this league about a year after Jackie Robinson did so in Major League Baseball. He was the 21st Black player to sign a contract with a team in the MLB organization and the first from Canada. Thomas played 12 games with the Barons in 1949 but never played professional baseball again.

Thomas spent the early 1950s playing in Ontario's Intercounty Baseball League. During the 1951 season, he won the league batting title as a member of the Kitchener Panthers. The same year he was named the league's Most Valuable Player, with a batting average of 0.383. In addition to his time with the Panthers, he played fastball for the Windsor Jets and Toronto Beaches.

== Globetrotters ==
Racism prevented Thomas from playing in the professional basketball leagues. He played with the Cincinnati Crescents, a negro all-star barnstorming baseball team owned by Abe Saperstein, who also owned the Harlem Globetrotters. This connection brought him to the Globetrotters and he was invited to their training camp in Chicago in 1949. He arrived late because he had to finish the football season with the Toronto Argonauts of the Canadian Football League where he was the second Black player and first Black Canadian player. He played a season for the New York Renaissance, a Globetrotter all-Black professional basketball team from Harlem, New York. After one season, he moved to the western division Kansas City Stars, another Globetrotter team.

== Later life ==
In 1952, he was not selected for the Canadian Olympic basketball team, where he would have been the only Black player on an otherwise all-White team. After having surgery to repair a knee injury, he could no longer play professional sports but continued to play in smaller independent leagues in Canada. He played basketball for the Toronto Tri-Bells, a Canadian men's amateur team, leading the team to the 1953 Canadian senior men's basketball title.

Following his athletic career, Thomas became a coach and physical education teacher. He joined the staff of Valley Park High School in East York, Ontario in 1970, where he worked until his death.

Thomas died on May 20, 1981, in Toronto. He was buried in Windsor's Greenlawn Memorial Gardens.

== Lack of recognition ==
Thomas was known mostly in the Windsor area. He competed during a time of racism in sports just before the beginning of integration. According to William Humber, a historian on Canadian sports, racial barriers prevented Thomas from becoming a national star, as well as kept him relatively unknown. "Today, he would have been a star in any of those sports" said Humber.

According to Miriam Wright, a history professor at the University of Windsor, Southern Ontario was racially segregated like parts of the United States during the Jim Crow era. Thomas and his Black teammates were often not served at restaurants and his teams were not allowed to compete with White teams. As a Black person, he did not have the same opportunities as White athletes. Wright says that Thomas's story is not well known because "African-Canadian history was not something that was considered important or was only considered in the context of the Underground Railroad story."

After decades of not being recognized, Thomas was inducted into the Canadian Baseball Hall of Fame on November 16, 2021.

== Awards and honors ==
- Voted second in a 1950 Canadian Press poll to determine Canada's finest basketball player of the 1900–1949 period.
- Windsor/Essex County Sports Hall of Fame (inducted 1981)
- University of Windsor Alumni Sports Hall of Fame (inducted 1986)
- Afro-American Sports Hall of Fame (inducted 1994)
- Canadian Basketball Hall of Fame (inducted 1995)
- Fred Thomas Park (formerly Glengarry Park) in Windsor, Ontario, is named after him.
- 2024 inductee of the Canadian Sports Hall of Fame
- Honored during Black History Month at Windsor Express game, February 22, 2015
