= Wayne Norton =

Canadian baseball player and scout (1942–2018)

- Norton in 1983
- Outfielder / Coach / Scout
- Born: November 13, 1942; Winnipeg, Manitoba, Canada
- Died: January 6, 2018 (aged 75)
- Batted: Left Threw: Right

Member of the Canadian

Baseball Hall of Fame
- Induction: 2016

Wayne Norton (November 13, 1942 – January 6, 2018) was a Canadian professional baseball outfielder, coach, and scout. He played 10 seasons in Minor League Baseball, then had a lengthy career as a coach and scout. Noted for his impact on baseball in Canada, Norton was inducted to the Canadian Baseball Hall of Fame in 2016. Listed at 6 feet 1 inch (1.85 m) and 188 pounds (85 kg), he threw right-handed and batted left-handed.

== Playing career ==
Norton was born in Winnipeg, Manitoba, and grew up in Port Moody, British Columbia. He played amateur baseball in the Vancouver area for Coquitlam in the late 1950s, then played college baseball for the Whitworth Pirates in Spokane, Washington. After batting .419 during his freshman season, he signed with the New York Yankees in June 1961 and was assigned to the Florida State League (FSL).

In his first professional season, Norton batted .238 with one home run and 21 runs batted in (RBIs) in 66 games with the St. Petersburg Saints of the FSL. After the season, he was claimed by the Kansas City Athletics in the minor-league portion of the Rule 5 draft. Norton went on to spend the remainder of his Minor League Baseball career within the Athletics organization. (Note: The Athletics franchise was in Kansas City through 1967, then relocated and became the Oakland Athletics.) He first reached Triple-A in 1966 with the Vancouver Mounties of the Pacific Coast League, and finished his playing career in 1970 with the Triple-A Iowa Oaks of the American Association. Overall, Norton played in 1206 minor-league games, 459 at the Triple-A level. He had a career batting average of .242 with 107 home runs and 490 RBIs. Defensively, he played 1080 games in the outfield, with a .968 fielding percentage. He also played 10 games as a third baseman and made one appearance as a second baseman.

== Post-playing career ==
After his playing career, Norton had a long career in coaching and scouting. He established Canada's Junior National Team and managed the Canada national baseball team at the 1975 Pan American Games. In 1986, he established a baseball academy in Vancouver, the National Baseball Institute (NBI). Players developed at NBI include Matt Stairs and Corey Koskie.

Norton left NBI in 1994, worked as a scout for the Baltimore Orioles from 1996 to 1999, then moved to the Seattle Mariners in 2000. He was hired into both organizations by Pat Gillick. Norton scouted for the Mariners in Canada for 17 years, and also scouted in Europe. Canadian players he signed include Phillippe Aumont, Tyler O'Neill, James Paxton, and Michael Saunders. In Europe, he signed players such as Greg Halman, Alex Liddi, and Dylan Unsworth. (Note: Unsworth, born in South Africa, attended the European Baseball Academy in Italy.) Norton was honored as International Scout of the Year by the Mariners (2007), and twice was named Canadian Scout of the Year by the Canadian Baseball Network (CBN) (1998, 2013). CBN named the Wayne Norton Award, presented to their selection for minor-league pitcher of the year, in his honor.

== Personal life and death ==
Port Moody, where Norton grew up, honored him with a civic award in 2015, and named the city's Wayne Norton Baseball Diamond in his honor in 2018. Norton was diagnosed with ALS in 2015, and continued to scout for the Mariners during the 2016 season despite his illness. In June 2016, he was inducted to the Canadian Baseball Hall of Fame. He threw out a ceremonial first pitch at Safeco Field in September 2017.

Norton died in January 2018, aged 75. He was survived by his wife, a daughter, and a son.
