= William Thomas Harris =

William Thomas Harris may refer to:

- Bill Harris (1931–2011), Canadian baseball player
- William Thomas Harris, one of the co-founders of Harris Teeter
