= Roy Perry (dentist) =

Canadian politician (1905–1972)

Dr. Roy Perry
- Born: 1905; Chatham, Ontario
- Died: October 26, 1972
- Education: DDS, University of Toronto
- Occupation: Dentist
- Spouse: Charlotte Bronte Perry (married 1927–1972)

Roy Prince Edward Perry (1905–1972) was a Canadian dentist, politician, and community leader from Windsor, Ontario. He was the first Black Canadian to be on Windsor's governing Board of Control, President of the Essex County Dental Association, and a long-serving alderman for his ward. As an elected official, he focused on redeveloping certain areas of the city and increasing recreational opportunities for the local youth.

He was active in the Windsor community as a member of many local organizations, and as the host of a well-known and well-attended annual skating party for local children. He was recognized for his contributions locally and nationally.

== Early life and education ==
Roy Perry was born in 1905 and lived on a farm in Chatham, Ontario. He lost his father at a young age. He then moved with his family, at the age of 2, to Windsor, Ontario. While attending school, Perry was noted to be an excellent athlete. He was involved in many sports such as football, baseball, basketball, and track and field while attending Patterson Collegiate in Windsor. During his time on the school basketball team, the team won the provincial championships. After graduating, he attended Meharry Medical College where he graduated from the Dental School. He then attended the University of Toronto, where he earned his doctor of dental surgery. After graduation he returned to Windsor and was a practicing dentist there for 30 years.

== Political career ==
In 1949, Perry was elected alderman for Ward 3. In his role as an elected official, Perry secured provincial and federal funding to redevelop areas of the city. Redevelopment included beautifying the waterfront by removing old railway tracks. He also improved recreational opportunities for youth, in an attempt to prevent juvenile delinquency. In 1956 he became a member of Windsor's governing Board of Control, making Perry one of the first Black Canadians to obtain this position in Windsor.

Later in 1958, he ran for mayor but ultimately lost the election. His platform focused on redeveloping certain areas of the city, diversifying industries, increasing employment. During the election year, newspapers noted that his campaign was unlikely to succeed, though they argued that race did not play a factor in the election. In 1964 Perry was re-elected as alderman, and also announced his intention to seek the Liberal party seat for the provincial riding of Windsor-Sandwich.

== Community involvement ==
Roy Perry and his wife Charlotte Brontë Perry were known for hosting social events well-attended by members of their community. Beginning in 1949, they hosted an annual skating party . In January 1952, a crowd of 500 attended and a performance was provided by performers from the Windsor Figure Skating Club. In February 1955, around 2000 children attended at the Windsor Arena. The Perrys would also host parties at their home during Christmas, providing 200 children with gifts from Santa Claus.

Roy Perry was involved with the Essex County Dental Association, and was the first Black Canadian to be a member. He would eventually become the association's president, as well the director of the local YMCA, and the chairman of the Windsor Board of Health. He also founded, and was the first president of, the Armstead Athletic Club, which helped students obtain scholarships and grants.

== Legacy and awards ==
The redevelopment plan for downtown Windsor has been attributed to Roy Perry, including the McDougall Street Corridor. This plan included development of low income housing, including an 80 unit apartment building named after Perry.

During Canada's centennial, Perry received a trophy for outstanding contributions to the country, presented by Queen Elizabeth II during a visit to Canada. He was also named Citizen of the Year by the Windsor Citizen's club in 1970 in recognition of his work with underprivileged youth.

== Personal life ==
Roy Perry was married to Charlotte Brontë Perry in 1927. The couple met while Charlotte Brontë Perry was attending the Virginia Seminary and College. They initially lived in Los Angeles, where Charlotte Brontë Perry worked in the advertising department of a newspaper, before returning to Windsor in 1940. Here they resided in their Riverside Drive home, where they hosted their Christmas parties.

The Perrys were prominent socialites and often hosted such famed guests as Dorothy Dandridge. Charlotte Brontë Perry was an acclaimed historian, author of at least two books. The first, The Long Road: The history of the coloured Canadian in Windsor 1867 - 1967, focused on the history of the Black-Canadian residents in Windsor. This text is considered a definitive work on black history in Windsor, a project since expanded by researchers at Biblioasis and the North Star Cultural Community Centre through a 2018 sequel titled The Long Road Continues. The second was a biography on her husband's life and successes: One Man's Journey: The biography of alderman Dr. Roy Prince Edward Perry.

Roy Perry died October 26, 1972. His wife and two sisters survived him. Charlotte Brontë Perry died in 1985.

== Arms ==
Coat of arms of Roy Perry
Crest A lion sejant Azure collared Argent charged with three barrulets Sable its paw resting on a sphere Argent. Escutcheon Gules two piles Or and three pears slipped and leaved counterchanged on a chief Or a tower Sable between two maple leaves Vert. Motto Fortiter Fideliter Feliciter (Courageously, Faithfully, Happily)
