= Jim Ridley =

Canadian baseball player and scout

- Outfielder / Coach / Scout
- Born: July 9, 1945; Toronto, Ontario, Canada
- Died: November 28, 2008 (aged 63); Burlington, Ontario, Canada
- Batted: Right Threw: Right

Member of the Canadian

Baseball Hall of Fame
- Induction: 2014

James Beswick Ridley (July 9, 1945 – November 28, 2008) was a Canadian professional baseball outfielder, coach, and scout. He played two seasons in Minor League Baseball, then had a lengthy career as a scout. He coached the Canada national baseball team at both the Summer Olympic Games and Pan American Games, and was inducted to the Canadian Baseball Hall of Fame in 2014. Listed at 6 feet 2 inches (1.88 m) and 170 pounds (77 kg), he batted and threw right-handed.

== Biography ==
Ridley played in Minor League Baseball during 1964 and part of 1965, for three teams within the Milwaukee Braves organization. In 1964, he spent time with the Sarasota Rookie League Braves in Florida, and the Greenville Braves of the Western Carolinas League. In 77 games that season, he had a .263 batting average with 25 runs batted in (RBIs). In 1965, he played 32 games for the West Palm Beach Braves of the Florida State League, batting .165 with seven RBIs. Defensively, he appeared in 105 total games, all as an outfielder, with a .957 fielding percentage.

Ridley later played in the Intercounty Baseball League of Southern Ontario from 1972 to 1975. He had a .386 batting average in 1972 with the Toronto Maple Leafs, and was named league MVP in 1974 as player-manager of the Stratford Kraven Knits. Stratford won that season's league championship, and Ridley was named manager of the year. He underwent spinal fusion surgery after the 1975 season, and did not resume his playing career. He is considered one of the top 100 players in league history.

Ridley first worked as a scout during the 1973 season, in a part-time role for the Detroit Tigers. He joined the Toronto Blue Jays as a scout in 1976 and stayed with the team for 26 years. He is credited with helping the team sign players such as Paul Spoljaric, Rob Butler, and David Corrente. In 2002, he became a scout for the Minnesota Twins; he helped the team sign Rene Tosoni.

Ridley also coached at multiple levels. He was a coach with the Medicine Hat Blue Jays, a minor-league team in the Pioneer League, for the team's first three seasons, 1978–1980. He later coached the Canadian junior national team during 1983–1988, winning bronze medals at the World Junior Baseball Championship competitions of both 1983 and 1987. He coached the Team Canada entries in baseball at the 1988 Summer Olympics and baseball at the 1991 Pan American Games. The team's participation in the 1988 Olympics is remembered for a win over Team USA in Seoul, while at the 1991 Pan Am Games the team had a lengthy brawl with Team Mexico during a game in Havana.

In addition to his baseball career, Ridley was also a schoolteacher in Stewarttown, Ontario. He died from cancer in November 2008, aged 63. He was survived by a daughter and two sons. Ridley twice won the Canadian Baseball Network's scout of the year award: first in 2004, and posthumously in 2009, when the award was renamed in his honor. In 2014, Ridley was inducted to the Canadian Baseball Hall of Fame. In 2019, he was inducted to the Milton Sports Hall of Fame in Milton, Ontario.
