= Stanley Nantais =

Canadian basketball player and coach

Stanley "Red" Nantais
Personal information
- Born: July 25, 1913 Windsor, Ontario, Canada
- Died: January 26, 2004 (aged 90)

Sport
- Sport: Basketball
Medal record
Men's basketball
Representing Canada
Olympic Games
Silver medal – second place	1936 Berlin	Team

Stanley "Red" Nantais (July 25, 1913 – January 26, 2004) was a Canadian basketball player and coach, from Windsor, Ontario, Canada.

== Biography ==
Text taken from University of Windsor biography - see external link below...

Stanley "Red" Nantais was born in Windsor, Ontario, on July 25, 1913.

While at Assumption High School, he was selected to the first All-City Basketball Team ever picked by the Windsor Star. He later played on some excellent teams at Assumption College for Father Willie McGee. The 1933–34 team advanced to the Eastern Canadian semi-finals. The 1934–35 squad won the Ontario and Eastern Canadian Titles, prior to losing to Victoria Blue Ribbons in the Canadian Finals.

He played on the Windsor Ford V-8's who won the Canadian Senior Title and represented Canada in the 1936 Summer Olympics in Berlin where they won the silver medal.

He played for Windsor Alumni in the 1938–39 season, they were Ontario Champions for the 12th time in 13 years. His final season as an active player was 1939–40, with the Windsor Alumni. They were Ontario champions, and semi-final losers at the Eastern Canadian playoffs.

In 1942, Stanley Nantais began a successful thirteen-year coaching stint at Assumption College. His teams won 201 and lost 146 games for a .560 winning percentage. His 1945–46 and 1946–47 Assumption College teams won the Ontario and Eastern Canadian Titles, but lost in the Canadian Finals, to Victoria Blue Ribbons in '45–46, and to the Vancouver Meraloma Club in '46–47. Assumption made it to the Eastern Canadian semi-finals in 1947–48. In 1948–49 Assumption was Ontario and Eastern Canadian Champions. There was no Canadian Finals that year.

His Assumption College teams defeated the Harlem Globetrotters twice, 55–51 in 1944, and 49–45 in 1945.

Nantais coached many great players at Assumption, such as Fred Thomas, Hank Biasatti, Gino Sovran, and Canadian Olympians Bill Coulthard, and Bob Simpson. He was Vice-President of the Ontario Amateur Basketball Association in the 1940s and was inducted into the Canadian Basketball Hall of Fame and the Windsor/Essex County Sports Hall of Fame.
