= Barnes Hall =

Building at Cornell University in Ithaca, New York

Coordinates: 42.446406°N 76.484592°W

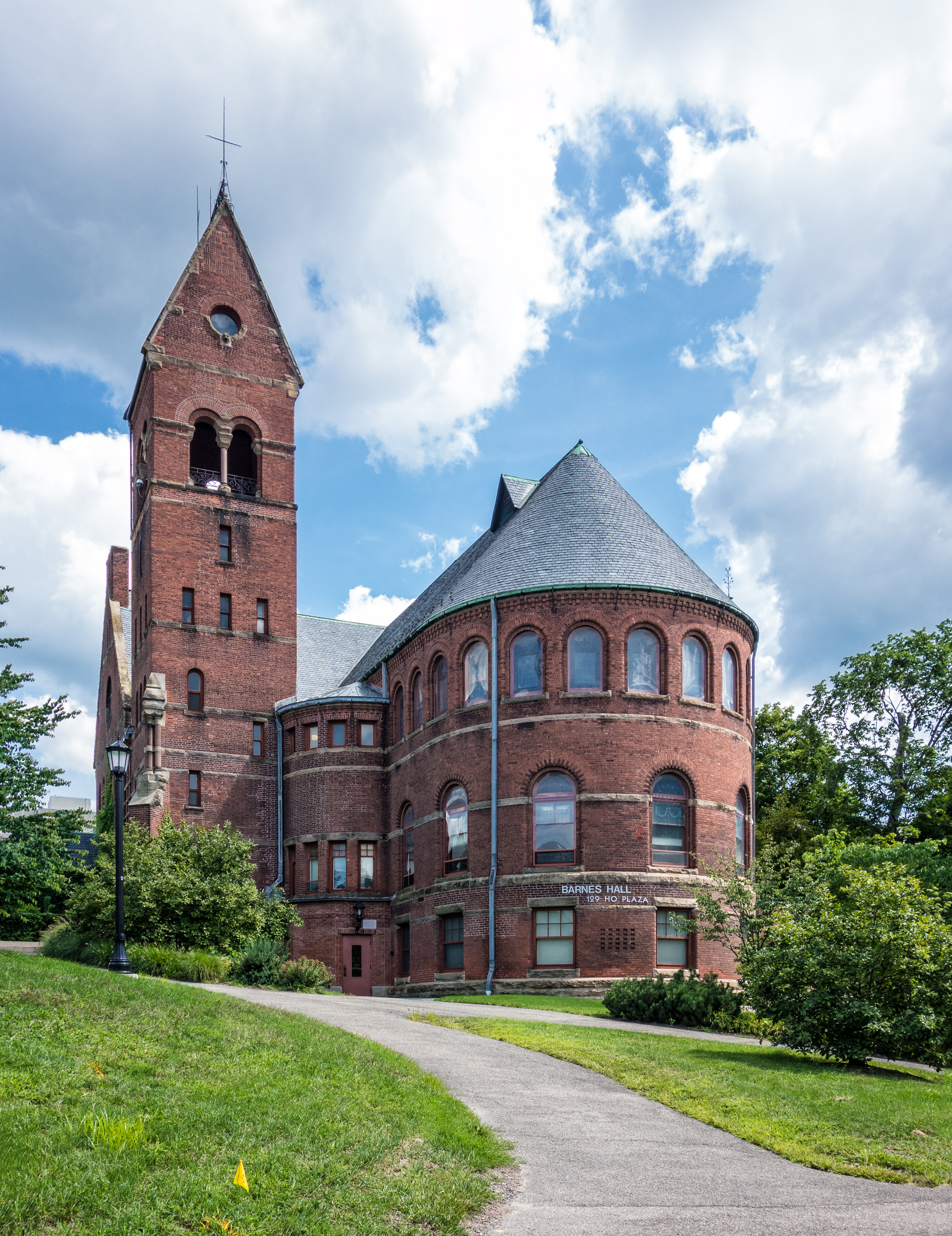
Barnes Hall in 2013.

Barnes Hall is a student-services building located in the center of the Cornell University campus in Ithaca, New York. It was built in 1887 in a Romanesque style and has 21,618 sq ft.

== History ==
John R. Mott, Cornell Class of 1888, was concerned about Cornell's "godless" reputation, and became the leader in the Student Christian Association. Under his leadership the group started raising money for a headquarters building. Alfred Smith Barnes, a publisher and Cornell trustee, funded the construction of the building next to Sage Chapel on what was then called Central Avenue (now Ho Plaza). William Henry Miller originally developed two competing designs for the building, a gothic design and the more modern Romanesque. The latter was constructed. The building is an L shape with a tower containing its main stairwell in the corner. Its main entrance faces the entry of Sage Chapel and it was built from matching bricks. The top floor is a large recital room with a cathedral ceiling supported by hammer beams. The lower floors contained public spaces and meeting rooms. The corner stone bears the inscription "For the Promotion of God's Truth among Men".

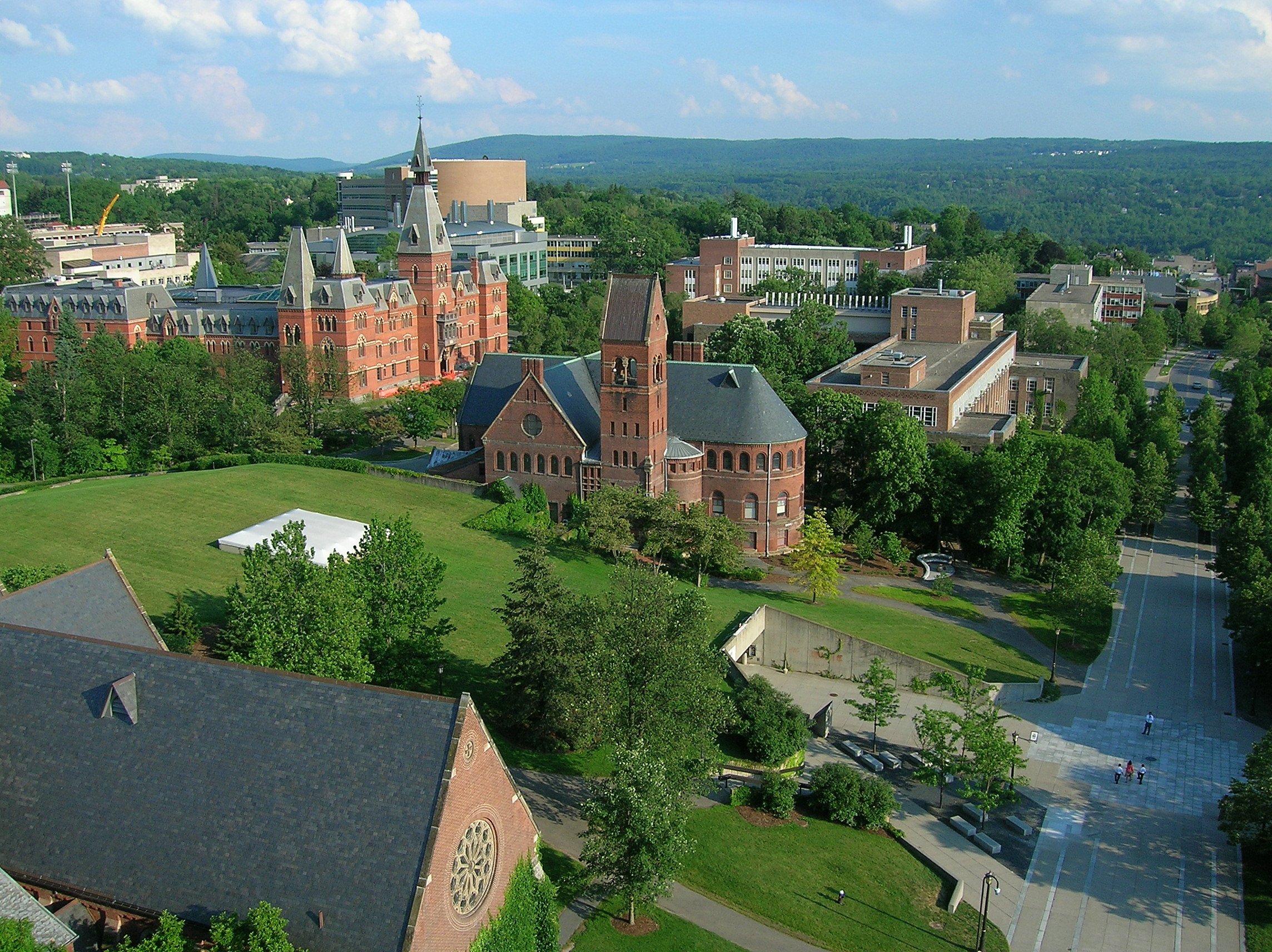
Barnes Hall (center) with Sage Chapel in the foreground and Sage Hall beyond it to the left

Barnes Hall was Cornell's first student union. In 1925, that function moved across Central Avenue to Willard Straight Hall. In 1952, its religious functions moved to Anabel Taylor Hall, and the Cornell Campus Store and a U.S. Post Office took over the lower levels. However, in 1970, a new underground campus store, designed by Earl Flansburgh was built under the grass quadrangle between Barnes and Sage. After closing the building for a year-long renovation, Barnes was repurposed with the Dean of Students Office in the ground floor, the International Students Office and the Committee on Special Educational Projects (COSEP) on the second floor and the top floor preserved as a recital hall with a grand piano. Following the merger of the Dean of Students Office and the University Unions Department, the dean of students moved into offices formerly used by various student activities in Williard Straight Hall.

Barnes Hall currently houses the Public Service Center and the Career Services Office, after a move from Sage Hall following the departure of the dean of students. Both offices are popular with students trying to connect with communities outside of Cornell.
