= Ron Stead =

Canadian baseball player

- Pitcher
- Born: September 24, 1936; London, Ontario, Canada
- Died: December 5, 2011 (aged 75); Chatham, Ontario, Canada
- Batted: Right Threw: Left

Member of the Canadian

Baseball Hall of Fame
- Induction: 2006

Ronald Duncan Stead (September 24, 1936 – December 5, 2011) was a Canadian baseball pitcher. He played briefly in Minor League Baseball, then went on to play for over a decade in the Intercounty Baseball League of Ontario, setting multiple league records. He was inducted to the Canadian Baseball Hall of Fame in 2006. Listed at 5 feet 10 inches (1.78 m) and 150 pounds (68 kg), he threw left-handed and batted right-handed.

== Biography ==
Stead grew up in Toronto near Maple Leaf Stadium, home ballpark of the Toronto Maple Leafs of the International League. He served as a batboy for the team in 1947 and later was a batting practice pitcher for the team. In 1956, he signed a player contract with the Maple Leafs and was assigned to the Florida State League (FSL).

Stead played in Minor League Baseball during 1956, 1957, and part of 1958. In 1956, he played in the FSL for the Orlando Seratomas. In 30 games (29 starts and 20 complete games) he compiled a 10–17 win–loss record with a 3.04 earned run average (ERA) while striking out 157 batters in 237 innings pitched. He returned to the FSL in 1957; pitching for the Gainesville G-Men he had a 17–10 record in 30 games (26 starts and 24 complete games) with a 2.34 ERA while striking out 138 batters in 226 innings. In 1958, Stead made two appearances for the Duluth-Superior White Sox, a farm team of the Chicago White Sox in the Northern League. His statistics for the season are incomplete, although a newspaper box score shows he allowed eight runs in 1 1/3 innings of relief during a game in May.

In early June 1958, Stead joined the Brantford Red Sox, a team in the amateur Intercounty Baseball League of Southern Ontario. One of his teammates with Brantford was outfielder Jimmy Wilkes, who had played several seasons in Negro league baseball. Stead went on to pitch for Brantford for nine seasons, through 1966, and pitched 14 total seasons in the Intercounty Baseball League, finishing in 1972 with the Guelph CJoys. Stead had great success in the league, including a 0.35 ERA in 1967, setting a new league record. He was named an all-star 10 times, was league MVP three times, and is considered one of the top 100 players in league history. Stead's uniform number, 11, was retired by the Brantford Red Sox in 2002. He still held multiple Intercounty Baseball League records, including career wins (104) and strikeouts (1,231), when he was inducted to the Canadian Baseball Hall of Fame in 2006.

Stead also played for the Canada national baseball team, appearing in the 1967 Pan American Games, contested in Winnipeg. He was the starting pitcher of the team's opening game, a 3–1 loss to Mexico; Stead struck out 10 batters in seven innings while allowing four hits. Canada won its second game in the tournament, defeating Puerto Rico by a 3–2 score. However, officials then ruled that four players on the Canadian team, including Stead, were ineligible to compete because they had previously played professional baseball. The win over Puerto Rico was forfeited, and the Canadian team continued in the tournament without the ineligible players, ultimately finishing last in the five-team competition. Stead later played for the champion Ontario baseball team at the 1969 Canada Games.

Outside of baseball, Stead worked for Union Gas. After his baseball career, he played slow-pitch softball until 2000. Stead and his wife, Betty, had three sons and a daughter. He died in 2011, aged 75.
