= Hippo Galloway =

American-born baseball player in Canada

- Outfielder / Second baseman
- Born: William Hipple Galloway; March 24, 1882; Buffalo, New York, U.S.
- Died: February 17, 1943 (aged 60); Buffalo, New York, U.S.
- Batted: Right Threw: Left

Negro league baseball debut
- 1900, for the Cuban X-Giants

Last appearance
- 1900, for the Cuban X-Giants

Teams
- Cuban X-Giants (1900)

Member of the Canadian

Baseball Hall of Fame
- Induction: 2021

William Hipple Galloway (March 24, 1882 – February 17, 1943), nicknamed "Hippo", was an American-Canadian professional baseball player. Born in Buffalo, New York, Galloway grew up in Dunnville, Ontario, and is considered "the first black Canadian to play organized baseball."

== Biography ==
Galloway grew up playing both baseball and ice hockey. In 1899, he played hockey for the Woodstock, Ontario, club in the Central Ontario Hockey Association, where he was known as a "cool and collected" player on the ice. In the summer of 1899, he played minor league baseball for the Woodstock Bains of the Canadian League, but was dismissed from the club when a white player objected to his presence. Galloway was the last black player in Canadian organized baseball until Jackie Robinson in 1946. Following his dismissal, Galloway left Canada to join the Cuban X-Giants of the Negro leagues for the 1900 season.
