= Alfred Smith Barnes =

American publisher (1817–1888)

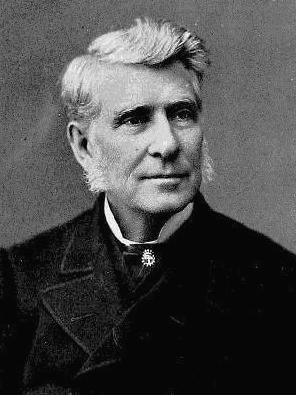
Alfred Smith Barnes

Alfred Smith Barnes (January 28, 1817 – February 17, 1888) was an American publisher and philanthropist.

== Early life ==
Barnes was born in New Haven, Connecticut, to Eli Barnes of Southington, Connecticut, a farmer and innkeeper, who founded the hamlet of "Barnesville", which is now Fair Haven, Connecticut. His mother's maiden name was Morris, and her family came from Morris Cove, Connecticut. Barnes went to primary school in Wethersfield, Connecticut, but he left when his father died in 1827. At the age of 12, Barnes was placed with an uncle, Deacon Norman Smith, who lived near Hartford, and he was schooled by Prof. Jesse Olney, working on his uncle's farm in the summer.

== Career ==
As a young man, Barnes worked as a clerk in a shoe store, then for D. F. Robinson & Co., a publisher in Hartford, where he learned the publishing trade. While in Hartford, he successfully published books aimed at the educational market by Charles Davies on mathematics and Emma Willard on history, in a joint venture between the three of them. Barnes then moved to Philadelphia in 1840, where for four years he built a publishing company, which he then transferred to New York City. After passing through a number of partners and company names, Barnes settled on "A. S. Barnes & Co." in 1865.

A. S. Barnes was a family operation: eventually, his five sons, his brother and one nephew were connected to the firm, which became the leading publisher of textbooks in the United States, as well as issuing general interest books on a wide range of subjects.

Barnes himself became well-connected in New York society. He was a member of the Union League Club of New York, a long-time member and supporter of the Long Island Historical Society and its Director for 21 years from 1867 until his death, and a trustee of the Clinton Avenue Congregational Church of Brooklyn, where he lived for many years. He was associated with the Union Pacific Railroad, the New York Elevated Railroad – for which he was a notable proponent – the Hanover Bank, the Dime Savings Bank and the Home Insurance Company.

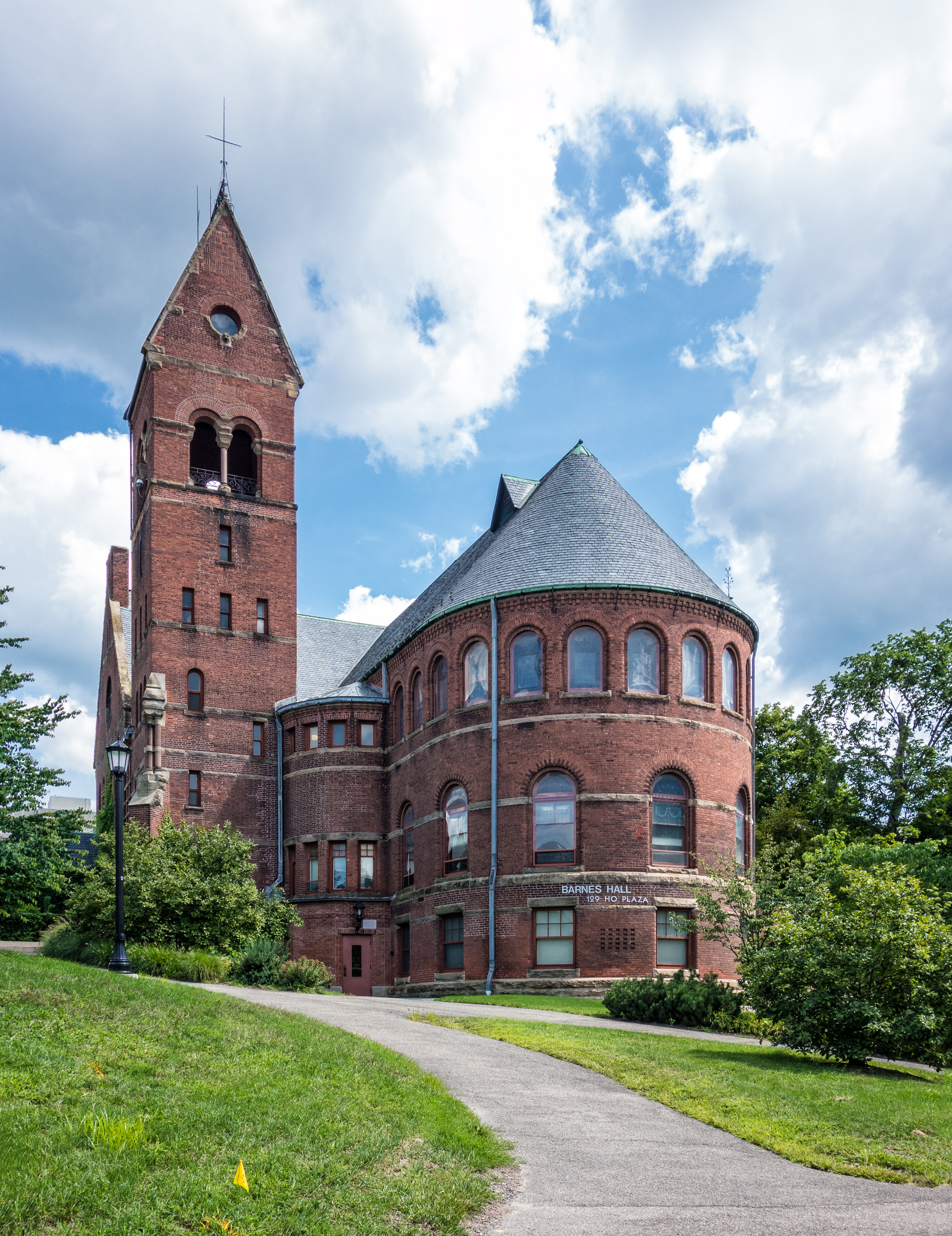
Barnes Hall, Cornell University (1887)

As a philanthropist, Barnes was a major benefactor of Cornell University, where he founded Barnes Hall, and was also associated with Fisk University in Tennessee. He supported academies and churches in Brooklyn as well, and contributed $3000 towards the construction of a building for the Long Island Historical Society.

== Family life ==
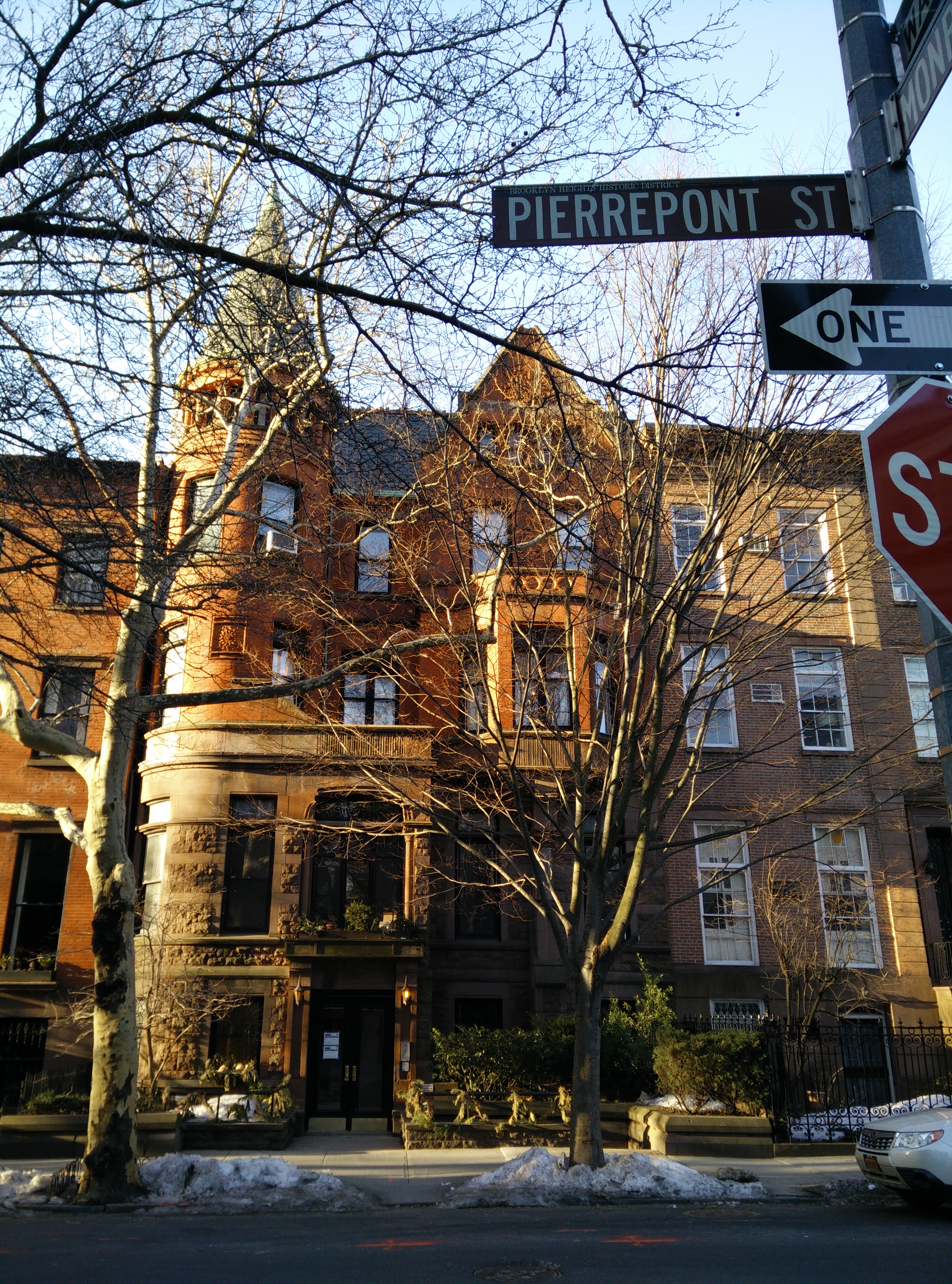
Barnes renovated the Brooklyn Heights townhouse at 114 Pierrepont Street

Barnes managed his company until his retirement in 1880. He was married twice, in 1840 to Harriet E. Burr, with whom he had ten children, and in 1883 to Mary Matthews Smith. His son, Alfred Cutler Barnes, took over the business after the death of his father, later helping to form the conglomerate American Book Company, under which "A. S. Barnes" continued as an imprint.

Barnes died at his Brooklyn Heights home, which later became the Brooklyn Women's Club.

== A. S. Barnes & Co. ==
A. S. Barnes published textbooks under the "Library for Teachers" imprint: one of their earliest best sellers was Clark's English Grammar. Barnes published Joel Dorman Steele's Fourteen Weeks science book series beginning in 1867 and his Barnes Brief History of the United States in 1871. The company also put out Watson's Readers, Davies' Arithmetic, Monteith's Geography and the National Series of Standard Science Books. Barnes occasionally published fiction, such as Joseph Lincoln's first novel, Cap'n Ernie.

The company also published trade magazines (Education Bulletin, National Teacher's Weekly, International Review), manufactured furniture for schools, and sold classroom supplies.

After Alfred Barnes' death, and the takeover of the company by his son, Alfred C. Barnes, and the formation of the American Book Company conglomerate, Ripley Hitchcock became editor-in-chief, bringing with him Gilbert Parker, Stephen Crane and Stewart Edward White. The new regime published educational books edited by Margaret Sangster as well as her Woman's Home Library series; the 17-volume Trail Makers series and New Barnes Writing Books, which created a sensation. The company incorporated in 1909, in order to provide fresh working capital, needed after acquiring another publishing firm. In 1917, a merger with Prang Co. was attempted, but abandoned after a few months. The company split up, with John Barnes Pratt acquiring the rights to the company name and much of the back catalog.

1941, the American Sports Publishing Company, publishers of the Spalding Athletic Library, was sold to A.S. Barnes. The Spalding Athletic Library provided books for over 30 different sports. In the 1950s, A.S. Barnes & Company became the major publisher of sports reference books, with groundbreaking books such as The Official Encyclopedia of Baseball by Hy Turkin and S. C. Thompson and Roger Treat's Football Encyclopedia. Both titles represented the first entry in the genre for their respective sports. In 1958, A. S. Barnes was acquired by Thomas Yoseloff, who merged his namesake publishing company into Barnes as an imprint.
