= Bill Harris (1950s pitcher) =

Canadian baseball player (1931–2011)

- Pitcher
- Born: December 3, 1931; Duguayville, New Brunswick, Canada
- Died: May 28, 2011 (aged 79); Kennewick, Washington, U.S.
- Batted: Left Threw: Right

MLB debut
- September 27, 1957, for the Brooklyn Dodgers

Last MLB appearance
- September 26, 1959, for the Los Angeles Dodgers

MLB statistics
- Win–loss record: 0–1
- Earned run average: 3.12
- Strikeouts: 3
- Stats at Baseball Reference

Teams
- Brooklyn / Los Angeles Dodgers (1957, 1959)

Member of the Canadian

Baseball Hall of Fame
- Induction: 2008

William Thomas Harris (December 3, 1931 – May 28, 2011) was a Canadian pitcher in Major League Baseball who played for the Brooklyn and the Los Angeles Dodgers teams. Listed at 5 feet 8 inches (1.73 m), 187 pounds (85 kg), Harris batted left-handed and threw right-handed. Born in Duguayville, New Brunswick, he attended Dorchester School.

Harris appeared in only two Major League Baseball games with the National League Dodgers – a losing start to the Philadelphia Phillies in 1957 and a relief appearance against the Chicago Cubs in 1959.

About his Major League Baseball debut, Harris said, "It was at Shibe Park against the Phillies and I did O.K. but lost 3–2. I was pinch-hit for in the seventh inning and Sandy Koufax came on in relief. Roy Campanella was the catcher and it turned out to be his last game".

In addition, Harris pitched in 14 Minor league seasons from 1951 through 1964, seven of them for the Montreal Royals of the International League, a Triple-A affiliate of the Dodgers.

Harris' most productive season came in 1952, when he posted a 25–6 record with a minuscule 0.83 earned run average and 12 shutouts in 294 innings of work.

Harris marveled at the talent that was around him in Montreal. "I think we had a team in Montreal that would beat most of the major league teams. Sparky Anderson was my second baseman. We also had Rocky Nelson (1B), John Roseboro (C), George Shuba (OF), Dick Williams (OF) and Chico Fernández (SS). Those were some great names", he explained.

Besides this, Harris went 14–10 with a 3.09 ERA for the Royals in 1958, helping them to clinch the International League pennant.

Overall, Harris registered a 170–131 and a 3.39 ERA in 431 career appearances (300 starts), including one perfect game and two one hitters, while pitching 2,461 innings.

Harris also pitched six seasons in winter ball, in both Panama (2) and Venezuela (4), playing for two of those years in the Caribbean Series.

In 2008, Harris gained induction into the Canadian Baseball Hall of Fame and Museum in St. Marys, Ontario.

Harris was a long-time resident of Kennewick, Washington, where he owned the popular tavern Billy's Bullpen for many years.

Harris died at his home in Kennewick, at the age of 79, after suffering bleeding ulcers.
