= S. C. Thompson =

American sportswriter

- Born: September 14, 1897; New Albany, Indiana, U.S.
- Died: March 21, 1967 (aged 69); Long Beach, California, U.S.
- Occupation: Musician
- Known for: Baseball research
- Notable work: The Official Encyclopedia of Baseball

1952 Baseball Encyclopedia

Sherley Clark Thompson (September 14, 1897 – March 21, 1967) was an American musician and baseball researcher best known as co-editor of the first baseball encyclopedia. He published under the name "S. C. Thompson" and was known to his friends as "Tommy."

== Musical career ==
Thompson was a musician by trade, beginning his career as a drummer before becoming a top concert cornetist. In 1921, he joined John Sousa's band as a bassoon player. Thompson moved to Long Beach in 1950, where he played in the Municipal Band and served as president of the local musician's union.

== Baseball Encyclopedia ==
Baseball was Thompson's passionate hobby, and he had spent more than twenty years collecting information on the history of the game and its players. In 1944, he discovered that sportswriter Hy Turkin lived around the corner from him, and the two struck up a friendship. That would eventually lead to a collaboration on the first baseball encyclopedia, using Thompson's archives as a starting point. The book, published in 1951 by A. S. Barnes & Company was universally hailed as a quantum leap in the field of sports reference. Turkin died in 1955, but Thompson edited four more editions of the book before his death in 1967. The book continued with other editors until 1979.

== Death ==
Thompson died after a prolonged battle with cancer. He and his wife, Rose, did not have any children.

== Sources ==
- Turkin, Hy; Thompson, S. C. (1956). The Official Encyclopedia of Baseball. New York City: A. S. Barnes & Company. LCCN 56-5560.
- Schwarz, Alan (2004). The Numbers Game: Baseball's Lifelong Fascination with Statistics. St. Martin's Press. pp. 52–54, 91. ISBN 0312322224.
