= Baseball in Canada =

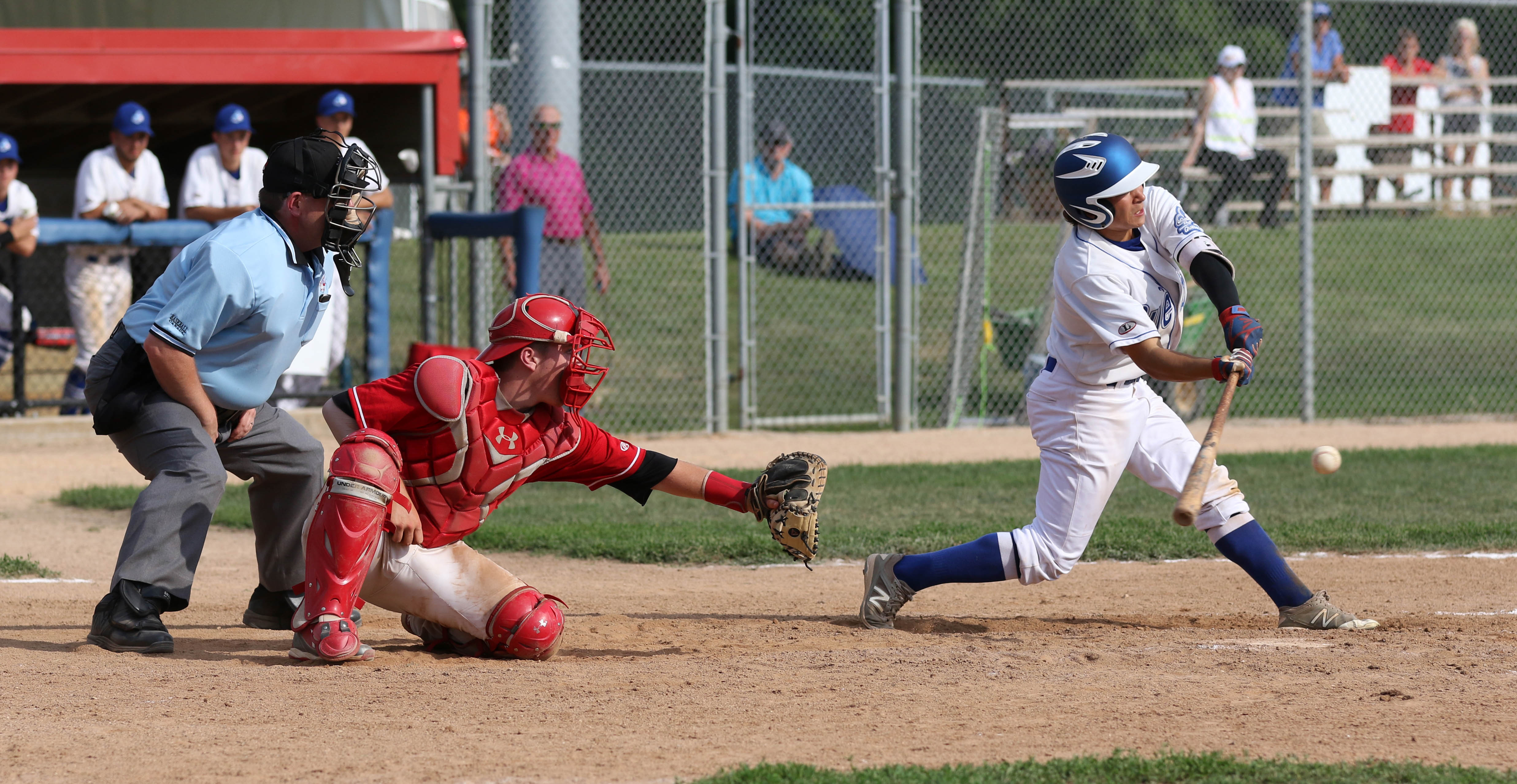
- A game in progress during the 2017 Canada Games
- Country: Canada
- Governing body: Baseball Canada
- National teams: Men's national team; Women's national team
- First played: Beachville, Ontario, 1838

Club competitions
- Major League Baseball; Minor League Baseball; American Association of Independent Professional Baseball; Frontier League

International competitions
- Summer Olympics; WBSC Premier12; Women's Baseball World Cup; World Baseball Classic; U-23 Baseball World Cup; U-18 Baseball World Cup; U-15 Baseball World Cup; U-12 Baseball World Cup

Baseball in Canada is played at various levels throughout the country, including by Major League Baseball's Toronto Blue Jays, founded in 1977 (Canada's first MLB team, the Montreal Expos, formed in 1969, relocated to Washington, D.C. in 2005) and Minor League Baseball's Vancouver Canadians, an affiliate of the Blue Jays competing in the High-A Northwest League. There are also several teams that compete in independent baseball leagues, such as the Trois-Rivières Aigles of the Frontier League and the Winnipeg Goldeyes of the American Association.

Notable amateur leagues include the Intercounty Baseball League (Ontario), Ligue de Baseball Majeur du Québec (Quebec), and the collegiate Western Canadian Baseball League (Alberta and Saskatchewan). There are additionally amateur-level baseball teams playing in each province in the summer months under the auspices of Baseball Canada. Several American-based summer collegiate leagues have teams in Canada.

== History ==
=== Early variations ===
Adapted from the British game of rounders—and by extension, cricket—the game of base ball or "townball" became popular in the early 19th century in Southwestern Ontario (then Canada West or Upper Canada), New York and New England. Originally, the rules of the game were informal in nature and often modified to reflect regional preferences.

In Ontario, a variant of baseball known as "The Canadian Game" was most prevalent. It featured five bases, bats that resembled those used in cricket or rounders and eleven players per team. All eleven players went to bat each inning, which would not end until they were all retired.

The American variant of baseball had nine players a side instead of eleven, and four bases instead of five. Southwestern Ontario was the first region in Canada to adopt this version of the game, doing so in 1860. The so-called "Canadian Game" soon fell out of favour.

=== 19th century ===
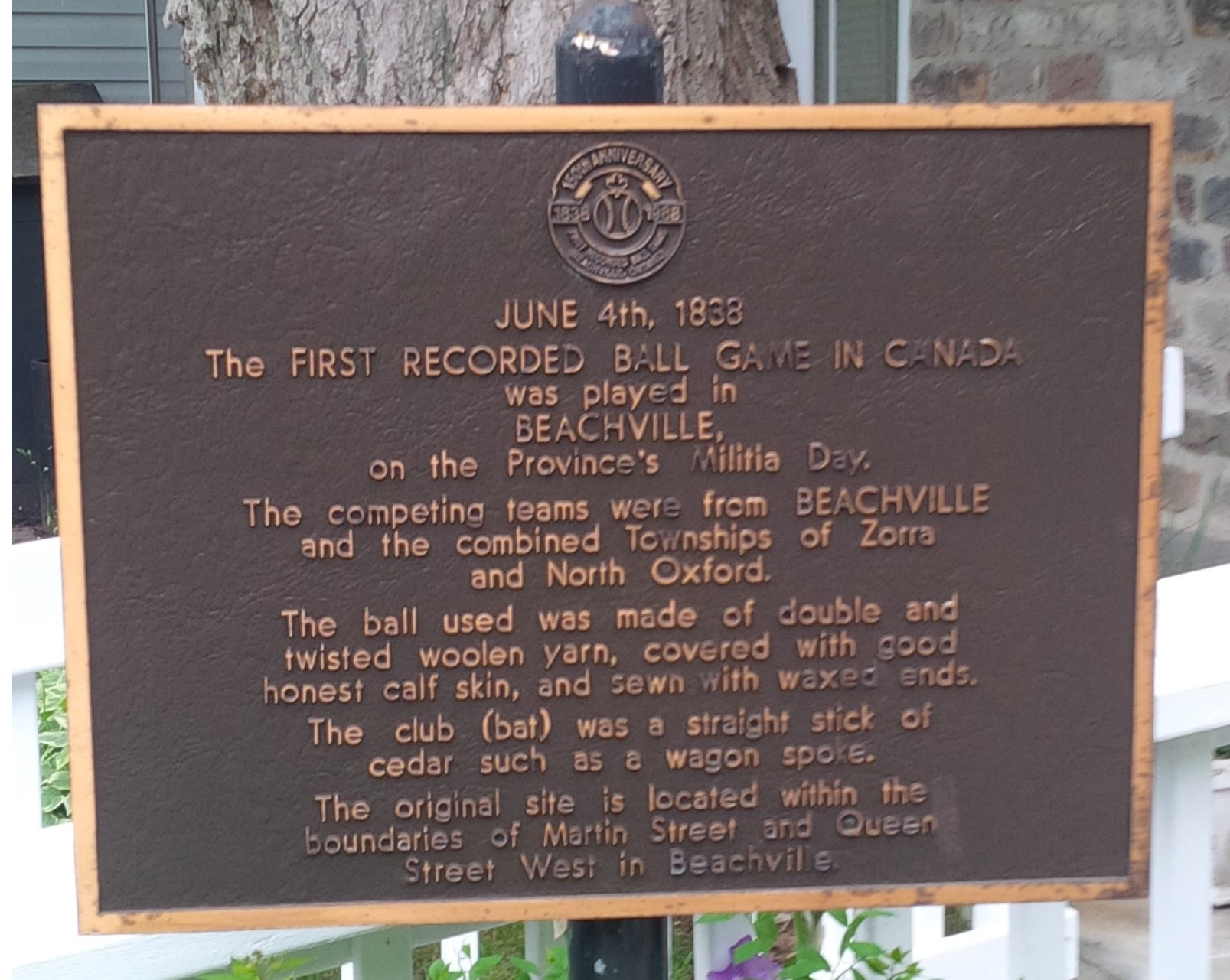
Plaque in Beachville commemorating the oldest verified baseball game played in Canada

University of Western Ontario professor Bob Barney researched the oldest verified baseball game played in Canada, based on a letter from Dr. Adam E. Ford of Denver, Colorado, formerly of St. Marys, Ontario, and Beachville, Ontario, to the editor of Sporting Life, published on May 5, 1886. In the letter, Ford described in detail a game he witnessed on June 4, 1838—Militia Muster Day, played in Beachville, Ontario. Barney verified the names of participants and descriptions of the field; by researching tax forms, census records, maps, church records, and tombstones, and found that all of the participants and details in Ford's letter were correct. The Journal of Sport History published Barney's findings in 1988. The Canadian claim to the oldest verified baseball game was subsequently recognized by the Canadian Baseball Hall of Fame, and the National Baseball Hall of Fame and Museum in Cooperstown, New York.

By the 1880s black Canadians were barred from playing in white professional leagues, but Emancipation Day black vs white matches provided an opportunity for black teams to shine, such as when the Northern Stars trounced a white team in Edmonton.

By 1891, academic Goldwin Smith described baseball as overtaking cricket in Canada due to its much shorter playing duration and lack of specialized turf requirements.

=== American history ===
Barney opined that following the American Revolution, settlers in Southwestern Ontario brought their recreational activities. Ted Spencer, curator of the National Baseball Hall of Fame and Museum, and historian Tom Heitz, noted that records exist of earlier bat and ball games played in the United States that evolved into baseball, and agreed that American settlers in Canada likely brought the game with them.

Rather than competing nationally in an east–west fashion, local baseball clubs would instead compete with their American neighbours to the south. This meant that teams from the Maritimes played teams from New England, teams from Quebec played against teams from New York and teams from British Columbia competed with those from Washington.

The London Tecumsehs of London, Ontario, were charter members of the International Association and won its first championship in 1877, beating the Pittsburgh Alleghenies.

The first Canadian to appear in a Major League game was Bill Phillips, who played for Cleveland. In his first game on May 1, 1879, the Saint John, New Brunswick native went hitless, although managed to get three hits the next game. In his second season, in 1880, he became the first Canadian to hit a home run in the Majors.

=== Early 20th century ===
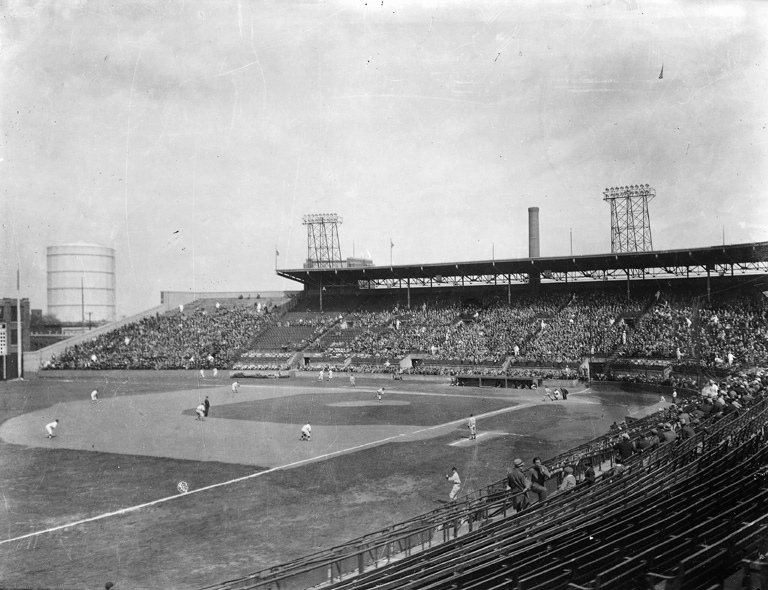
Delormier Stadium in Montreal was home to the Montreal Royals of the International League from 1928 to 1960.

By 1913, there were 24 minor league baseball teams in Canada, a number which has been unequalled since.

Babe Ruth hit his first professional home run on Canadian soil on September 5, 1914, at the former Hanlan's Point Stadium on Centre Island in Toronto. Ruth was playing for the Providence Grays against the Toronto Maple Leafs baseball team of the International League. In 1985, the City of Toronto erected a small plaque to denote the location, but it is difficult to locate, given the parklike setting and remote nature of the Toronto Islands.

In 1946, Brooklyn Dodgers general manager Branch Rickey assigned new-signing Jackie Robinson to the Montreal Royals of the International League, Brooklyn's Triple-A farm team. Robinson would famously go on to break Major League Baseball's colour barrier the following year in 1947, but during his season in Montreal Robinson led the Royals to the Governors' Cup, the IL championship, and became a beloved figure in the city. In Ken Burns' documentary film Baseball, the narrator quotes Sam Maltin, a stringer for the Pittsburgh Courier: "It was probably the only day in history that a black man ran from a white mob with love instead of lynching on its mind."

Following Robinson's breaching of the colour barrier, in the 1950s many other players from the declining Negro leagues travelled north to play in Canada, including Hall of Famers Leon Day, Satchel Paige and Willie Wells, who like many other African-American players competed in the Mandak League.

In 1957, former Cincinnati Reds and Philadelphia Phillies outfielder Glen Gorbous, a native of Drumheller, Alberta set the current world record for longest throw of a baseball at 445 feet 10 inches (135.89 m) in Omaha, Nebraska.

=== Late 20th century and beyond ===
The first Canadian in the National Baseball Hall of Fame was Ferguson Jenkins, a right-handed pitcher who compiled a 284–226 record, 3.34 ERA and 3,192 strikeouts in 19 seasons from 1965 to 1983 with the Philadelphia Phillies, Chicago Cubs, Texas Rangers, and Boston Red Sox. Jenkins is one of the Black Aces, a group of African American pitchers with at least 20 wins in a single major-league season (although Jenkins is actually a Black Canadian, not African American). In 2020, Larry Walker became the second Canadian inducted into the Hall of Fame. Walker played right field for the Montreal Expos, Colorado Rockies, and St. Louis Cardinals from 1989 to 2005, winning the National League MVP in 1997 with the Rockies.

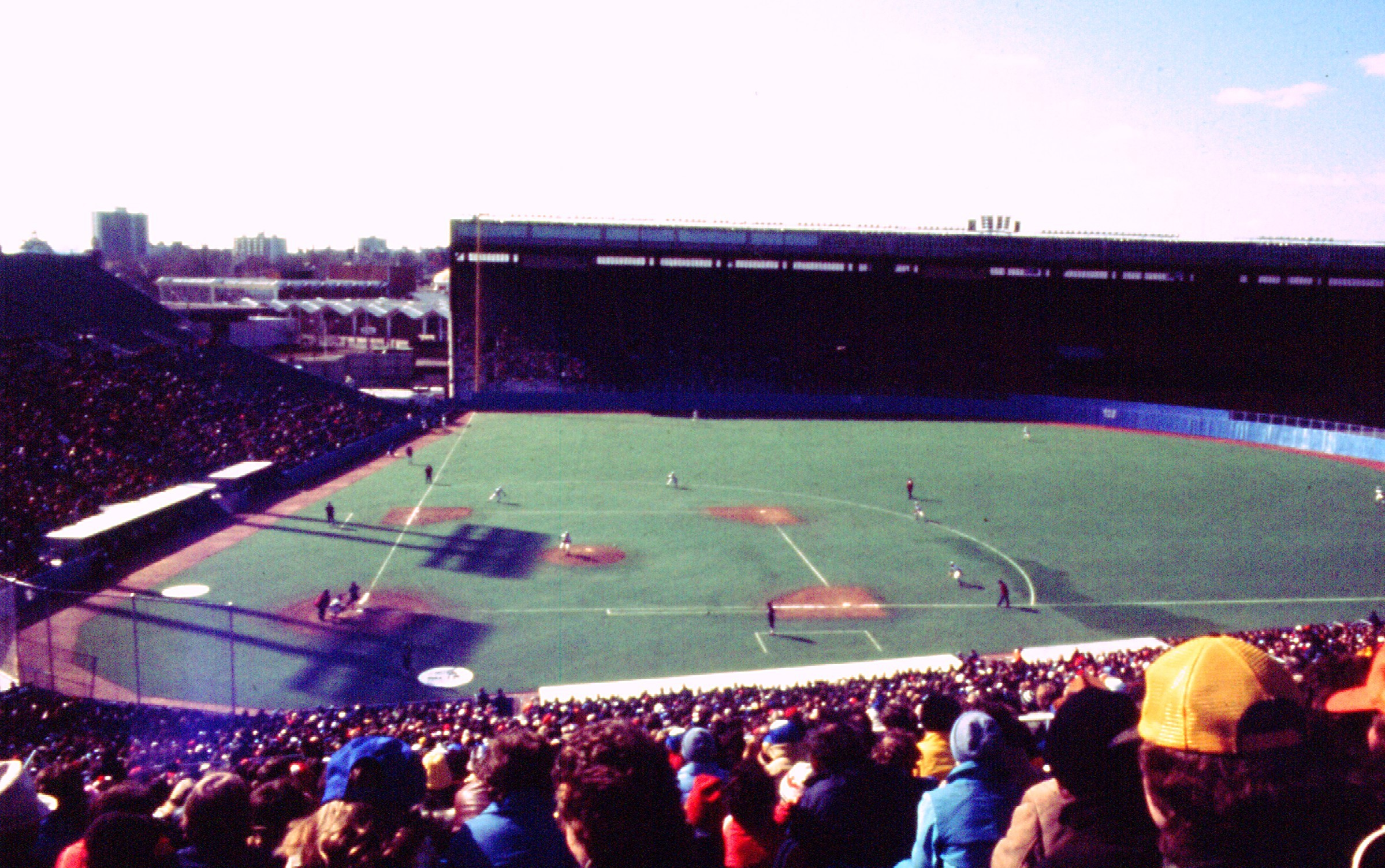
A baseball game during the Toronto Blue Jays's inaugural season. The team later became the first Canadian-based team to win the World Series.

The London Tecumsehs were refused admission to the National League in 1877 because they refused to stop playing exhibition games against local teams. While baseball is widely played in Canada, the American major leagues did not include a Canadian team until 1969, when the Montreal Expos joined the National League. The team enjoyed a widespread following until about 1994, when the Expos were in first place in the NL East; after the strike shortened year, a series of poor management decisions, disputes with the city, and neglect by the ownership caused the Expos to be routinely last in MLB attendance.

In 1977, the Toronto Blue Jays joined the American League. They later became the first Canadian-based team to win the World Series, winning back-to-back titles in 1992 and 1993.

In 1993, besides the two Canadian major league clubs, Canada hosted four Triple-A teams (the Calgary Cannons, Edmonton Trappers, Ottawa Lynx and Vancouver Canadians), one Double-A team (the London Tigers), two Class A Short Season teams (the St. Catharines Blue Jays and Welland Pirates) and two rookie-level teams (the Lethbridge Mounties and Medicine Hat Blue Jays).

In 2003 an attempt to create the Canadian Baseball League was launched, but the league folded halfway through its first season.

In 2004, the Expos, then owned by MLB itself, moved to Washington, D.C., and became the Washington Nationals, leaving the Toronto Blue Jays as the only remaining Canadian MLB team.

In the 2010s, the sport experienced a surge of popularity.

== Governance ==
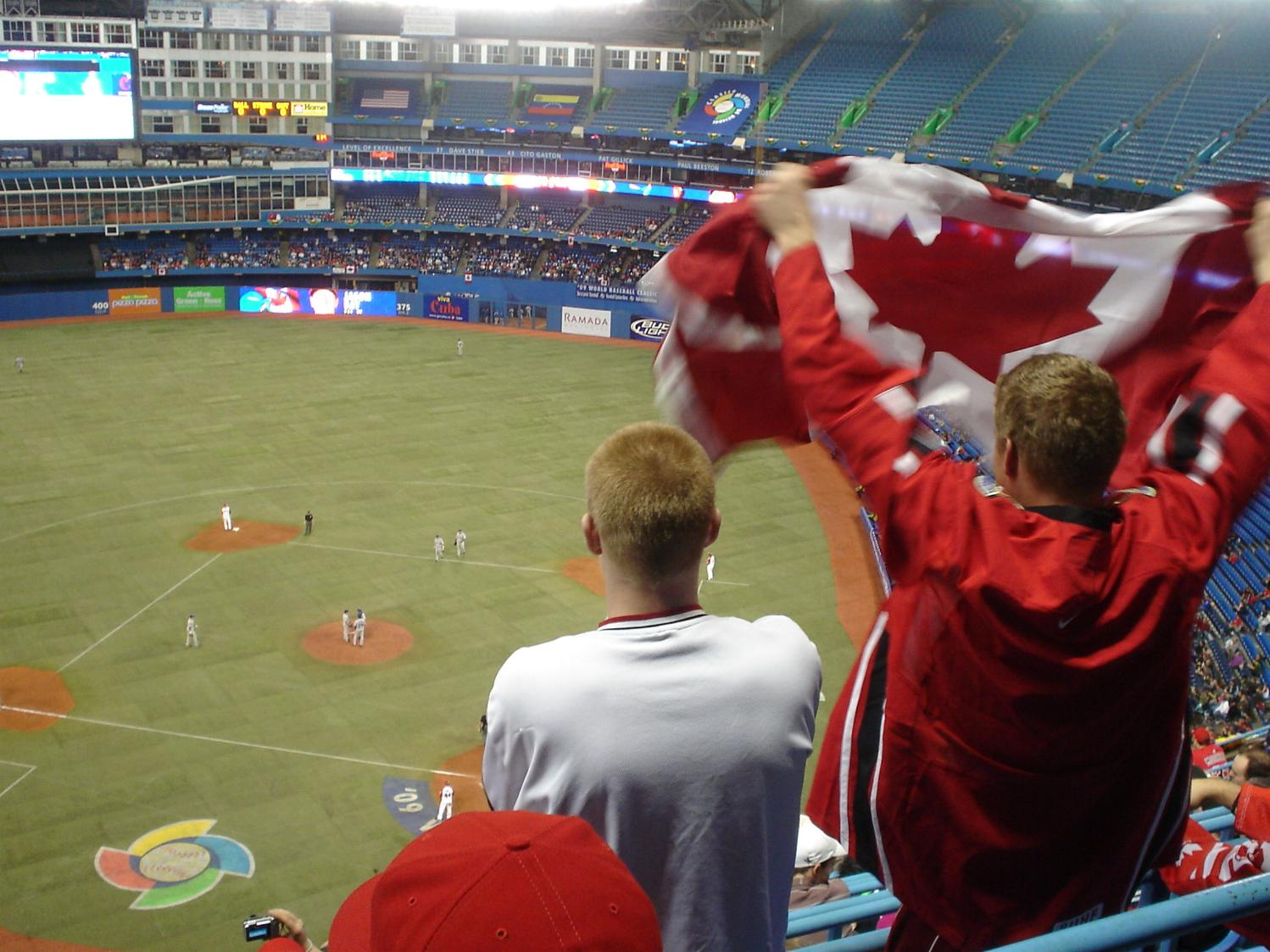
The Canadian national baseball team playing at the Rogers Centre during the 2006 World Baseball Classic

The governing body of baseball in Canada is Baseball Canada, which is based in Ottawa and was founded in 1964. Baseball Canada is a member of the Canadian Olympic Committee and the International Baseball Federation.

=== National team ===
The Canadian national baseball team represents Canada in international competitions. Since 1970, the team has participated in 17 Baseball World Cups. Canada earned the bronze medal in the 2009 Baseball World Cup, their highest finish in the history of the competition. In the 2004 Summer Olympics they placed fourth, losing the game for 3rd place to Japan and, in 2008, they finished fifth. In four appearances so far at the World Baseball Classic, the team has not finished higher than 9th place. The national team also won gold medals at the 2011 and 2015 Pan American Games.

== Club competition ==
After the Montreal Expos were relocated to Washington, D.C., only one Canadian team plays in Major League Baseball, the Toronto Blue Jays. Among the Minor League Baseball system, a collection of minor leagues that hold a formal relationship with Major League Baseball, only one is based in Canada, the Vancouver Canadians. The Vancouver Canadians are presently affiliate of the Blue Jays, and play in the Northwest League at the High-A level.

Several other Canada-based teams play in low-tier American independent circuits, including the American Association of Independent Professional Baseball, and the Frontier League.

== Notable players ==
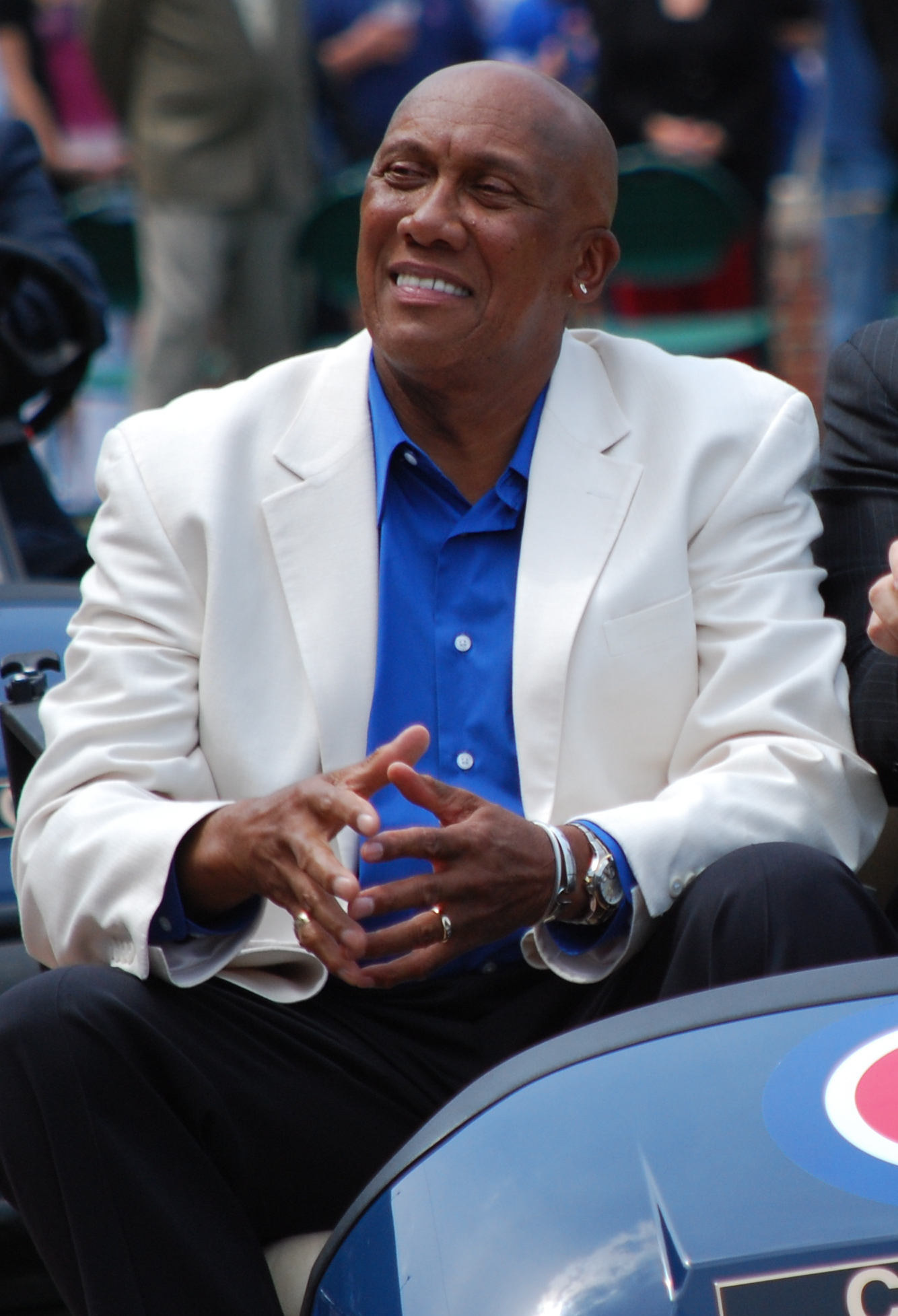
Ferguson Jenkins, one of only two Canadians in the National Baseball Hall of Fame

Canada has produced some successful players in Major League Baseball. Ferguson Jenkins and Larry Walker are currently the only Canadians in the National Baseball Hall of Fame. The following table lists other achievements earned by Canadian baseball players.

Award	Player	Year
MLB Most Valuable Player Award	Larry Walker	1997
MLB Most Valuable Player Award	Justin Morneau	2006
MLB Most Valuable Player Award	Joey Votto	2010
MLB Most Valuable Player Award	Freddie Freeman	2020
Cy Young Award	Ferguson Jenkins	1971
Cy Young Award	Éric Gagné	2003
MLB Rookie of the Year Award	Jason Bay	2004
Silver Slugger Award	Justin Morneau	2006, 2008
Silver Slugger Award	Russell Martin	2006
Silver Slugger Award	Larry Walker	1992, 1997, 1999
Silver Slugger Award	Jason Bay	2009
Gold Glove	Russell Martin	2007
Gold Glove	Larry Walker	1992, 1993, 1997, 1998, 1999, 2001, 2002
Rolaids Relief Man Award	John Axford	2011

== See also ==
- Baseball awards#Canada
- Canadian Baseball Hall of Fame
- List of baseball teams in Canada
- List of Major League Baseball players from Canada
- Pearson Cup
