= Hy Turkin =

American sportswriter

- Born: May 9, 1915; New York City, US
- Died: June 24, 1955 (aged 40); New York City, US
- Education: Cooper Union
- Occupation: Sportswriter
- Employer: New York Daily News
- Notable work: The Official Encyclopedia of Baseball

1952 Baseball Encyclopedia

Hyman C. Turkin (May 9, 1915 – June 24, 1955) was a sportswriter best known for co-editing the first baseball encyclopedia.

Turkin was born in New York City, one of seven children. He joined the staff of the New York Daily News after graduating from Cooper Union in 1936 with a degree in electrical engineering. Turkin covered baseball, basketball, and track for the paper.

== Baseball Encyclopedia ==
A chance meeting with baseball researcher S. C. Thompson in 1944 led the two to collaborate on what would become the first true baseball encyclopedia. Published by A. S. Barnes & Company in 1951, the book contained a complete listing of every man who had played Major League Baseball, along with the years they had played, the teams they had played for, and some basic statistics. It was a remarkable contribution to the field of baseball history.

The book earned the endorsement of Commissioner A. B. "Happy" Chandler, and nine revised editions were published after Turkin's death (the last in 1979).

== Personal life ==
Turkin was one of the founders of the National Foundation for Muscular Dystrophy, which later became the National Foundation for Neuromuscular Diseases. He was married to the former Florence Kerr, and the couple had a daughter named Margery.

Turkin died at the age of 40, following a six-month battle with liver disease. The New York Times writer Arthur Daley described him as "a bustling little dynamo with an inquisitive turn of mind."

Following Turkin's death, the Metropolitan Basketball Writers Association named an annual award after him; the Hy Turkin Memorial Award was given annually to professional basketball's rookie of the year. Winners included Oscar Robertson in 1961, and Lew Alcindor in 1970.

A Little League Baseball field in Dongan Hills, Staten Island, was named the Hy Turkin Memorial Field.

== Sources ==
- Turkin, Hy; Thompson, S. C. (1956). The Official Encyclopedia of Baseball. New York City: A. S. Barnes & Company. LCCN 56-5560.
- Schwarz, Alan (2004). The Numbers Game: Baseball's Lifelong Fascination with Statistics. St. Martin's Press. pp. 52–54, 91. ISBN 0312322224.
