= J. C. Patterson Collegiate Institute =

Information
- School type: Secondary school
- Established: 1854
- Closed: 1973

J.C. Patterson Collegiate Institute (also known as Patterson) was a public secondary school located in downtown Windsor from 1854 until 1973.

== History ==
The school began as a grammar school in 1854 and was turned into a high school in 1871 and was known as Windsor Collegiate Institute until 1929, when it was renamed, J.C. Patterson, after a Windsor lawyer and politician.

The official cornerstone for the building was placed in 1888, and the school remained on the same site until its closing in 1973. The building was demolished in 1979 and now a Food Basics supermarket. The next closest public high schools are Honourable W. C. Kennedy Collegiate or Walkerville Collegiate Institute.

=== Notable graduates ===
- Fulton Burley, actor, singer, Disney legend
- Paul S. Morton, Baptist minister
- Fred Thomas, multi-sport athlete (baseball, basketball, football)
