= Jim Fanning =

American-Canadian baseball player, manager, and executive (1927–2015)

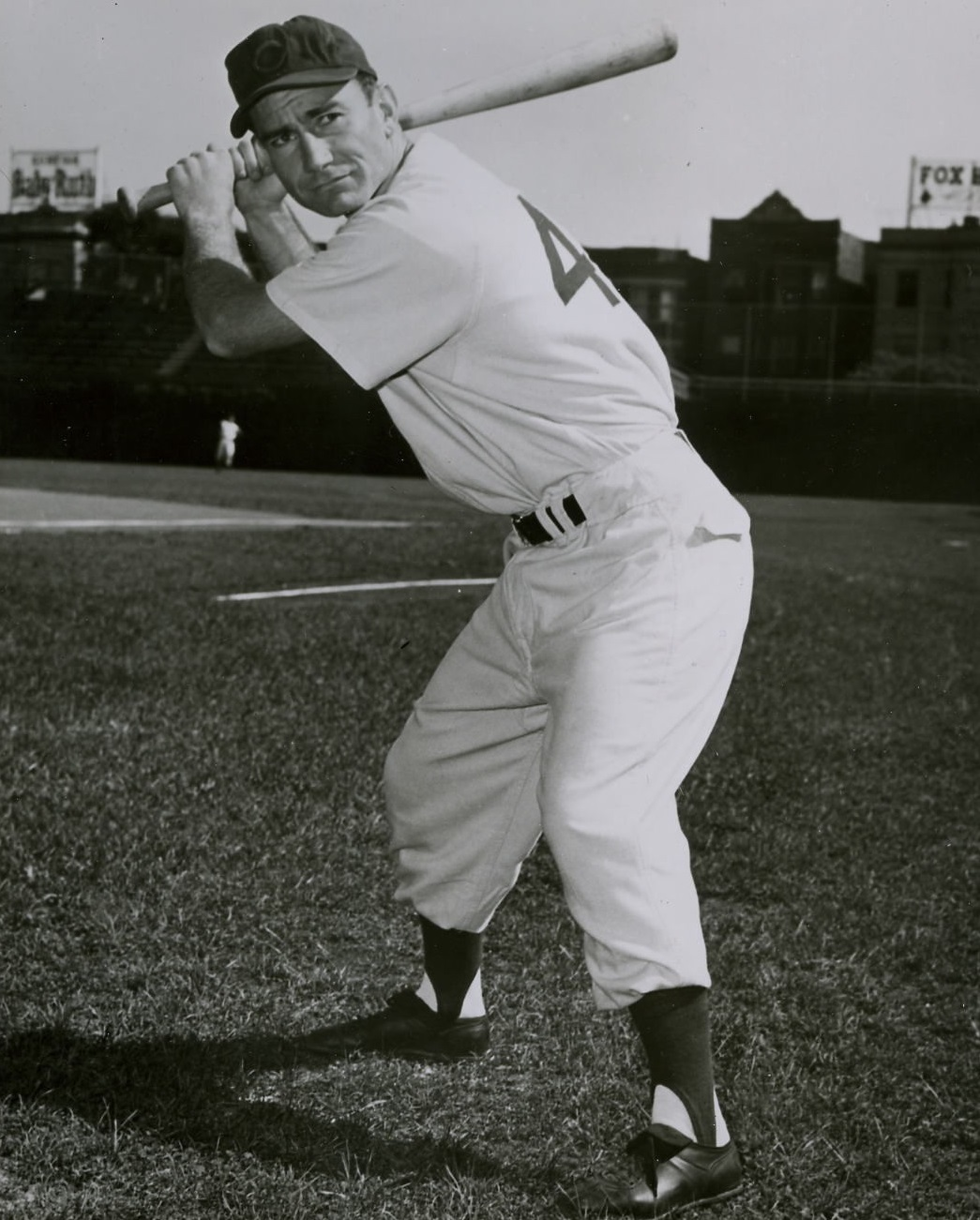
- Catcher
- Born: September 14, 1927; Chicago, Illinois, U.S.
- Died: April 25, 2015 (aged 87); London, Ontario, Canada
- Batted: Right Threw: Right

MLB debut
- September 11, 1954, for the Chicago Cubs

Last MLB appearance
- September 29, 1957, for the Chicago Cubs

MLB statistics
- Batting average: .170
- Home runs: 0
- Runs batted in: 5
- Stats at Baseball Reference

Teams
- As player: Chicago Cubs (1954–1957); As manager: Montreal Expos (1981–1982, 1984)

Career highlights and awards
- Montreal Expos Hall of Fame

Member of the Canadian

Baseball Hall of Fame
- Induction: 2000

William James Fanning (September 14, 1927 – April 25, 2015) was an American-Canadian catcher, manager and front office executive in Major League Baseball. Often called "Gentleman Jim", Fanning was the first general manager of the Montreal Expos of the National League (appointed in August 1968), and served the Expos in a number of capacities for almost 25 years. As their field manager in 1981, he guided Montreal into the playoffs for the only time in the 36-year history of the franchise.

== Playing and early front office career ==
Born in Chicago, Fanning grew up in the now unincorporated community of Moneta, Iowa, and attended its school, graduating with nine classmates in 1945. He played baseball for the Moneta Bulldogs and they earned a state runner-up title his sophomore season to Corwith. He later attended Buena Vista College in Storm Lake.

In his professional playing days, he was a catcher who played most of his career in the minor leagues. He spent the 1957 season and parts of three others with the Chicago Cubs between 1954 and 1957, compiling an anemic batting average of .170 in 64 career games played, with two doubles, no home runs and 24 total hits. On September 14, 1957, in the second game of a double-header against the Pittsburgh Pirates, Fanning caught Cub pitcher Dave Hillman, playing on their shared 30th birthdays, the only known instance of a battery sharing the same birth date (that game, though, is more famous for the three home runs hit by Chicago's star shortstop Ernie Banks).

Fanning then became a manager in the minor leagues, eventually joining the Milwaukee/Atlanta Braves organization, where in the middle of the 1960s he was promoted to the positions of Director of Minor League Operations and assistant general manager.

Fanning was briefly listed as a coach for the 1968 Braves, but before spring training began, he departed to become the first director of the Central Scouting Bureau. Just months later, when his old Milwaukee boss, John McHale, became the first president of the expansion Expos, Fanning accompanied him to Canada as the Expos' general manager. Fanning and McHale built the Expos from scratch; in those days, prior to the era of free agency, newly formed clubs could only rely on expansion and amateur drafts and trades to build their talent base.

== Building the expansion Expos ==
In the 1968 NL expansion lottery, Fanning drafted veterans such as Jesús Alou, John Bateman, Donn Clendenon, Larry Jackson, Mack Jones, Manny Mota and Maury Wills, and young players like Jack Billingham, Skip Guinn, Carl Morton and Bill Stoneman. He was forced to improvise when veteran pitcher Jackson, a five-time All-Star and winner of 194 career games, decided to retire rather than report; Fanning accepted shortstop Bobby Wine as compensation. Then he seemingly pulled off a blockbuster trade in January 1969, when he sent Alou and Clendenon to the Houston Astros for outfielder Rusty Staub, a two-time All-Star still only 24 years old. But Clendenon refused to go to Houston, and Staub declined to return there if the trade were cancelled. The matter took two months to settle, but was resolved when Fanning took back Clendenon and sent young pitchers Billingham and Guinn, with cash, to Houston to complete the trade.

Dubbed le Grand Orange, Staub became one of the early folk heroes of les Expos, along with fellow outfielder Jones and no-hit pitcher (and future Expos' executive) Stoneman. Most of the other veterans were soon traded: Mota and Wills were sent to the Los Angeles Dodgers on June 11 for veteran Ron Fairly, who became Montreal's regular first baseman four days later when Clendenon was swapped to the New York Mets for young players that included pitcher Steve Renko. The Expos improved incrementally over their first three seasons. Morton, whom Fanning knew from their days together in the Braves' organization, won 18 games in 1970 and was the NL Rookie of the Year; Renko would win a total of 28 games in 1970 and 1971, and 27 more in 1973 and 1974. Entering their fourth season in 1972, Fanning reshaped the Expos through another headlining transaction, trading Staub to the Mets for three young regulars – shortstop Tim Foli, outfielder Ken Singleton and first baseman Mike Jorgensen. The trio helped Montreal contend for the NL East title in 1973, when they finished only 31/2 games out of first place.

Overall, with opportunistic manager Gene Mauch at the helm, Fanning achieved a degree of success during his eight years as GM. In the mid-1970s, the Expos began to harvest players from their farm system, including Steve Rogers (1973), Barry Foote (1974), Gary Carter, Larry Parrish and Ellis Valentine (1975), and Warren Cromartie and Andre Dawson (1976). After the 1975 season, McHale and Fanning promoted Triple-A manager Karl Kuehl, who had overseen the development of many of the younger players, to replace Mauch at the Expos' helm.

However, when Montreal regressed in 1976 and fell back into the NL East cellar, Fanning was reassigned by McHale to a player developmental role and succeeded as general manager by Charlie Fox. Fanning then served in a number of front office posts with Montreal, including director of scouting, when, during the 1981 stretch run, he was called back into uniform. Manager Dick Williams, who had led the Expos into contention in 1979 and 1980, had alienated his players and clashed with the front office over his use of bullpen closer Jeff Reardon. With 27 games left in the season, Williams was sacked on September 8, and Fanning was named his replacement. The move came as something of a surprise; he hadn't managed in almost 20 years.

== Success and frustration as Expo manager ==
Fanning's calm and easygoing style favorably contrasted with Williams' hard edge, and the Expos won 16 of their last 27 games to capture the second-half NL East title, thus qualifying for the playoffs per 1981's strike-shortened, split-season format. The Expos defeated the defending world champion Philadelphia Phillies in the first round of the playoffs to advance to the NLCS against the Los Angeles Dodgers. In the deciding fifth game, on what became known in Montreal as "Blue Monday" (October 19, 1981), Los Angeles outfielder Rick Monday hit a tie-breaking home run in the ninth inning off Montreal ace pitcher Rogers. The Dodgers won, 2–1, and advanced to the World Series, where they defeated the New York Yankees. This was Montreal's only trip to the baseball playoffs; in 2005, the club relocated to Washington, D.C., and became the Washington Nationals.

Fanning returned as pilot in 1982, but the Expos finished a disappointing third, six games behind the St. Louis Cardinals. Fanning moved back into the front office, handing over the manager's job to Bill Virdon, recently fired by the Houston Astros. But Virdon could not arrest the Expos' decline in 1983 and was fired with 30 games left in the 1984 campaign. Once more, Fanning came down to the field and took over the club, but with poor (14–16) results, as the team finished a disappointing fifth.

== Late career and death ==
Fanning, with a career major league managing record of 116–103 (.530), hung up his uniform at the close of the 1984 season and returned to Montreal's front office. He was succeeded as pilot by Buck Rodgers. After a brief stint as a color commentator on Expos radio and TV broadcasts, Fanning left the Montreal organization, working next as a scout for the Colorado Rockies prior to becoming an assistant general manager and then ambassador to amateur baseball/Canada for the Toronto Blue Jays.

He was elected to the Canadian Baseball Hall of Fame in St. Marys, Ontario, in 2000, and received his Canadian citizenship in 2012.

Fanning died as the result of a heart attack on April 25, 2015, at his London, Ontario, residence at the age of 87.

== Managerial statistics ==
Team	Year	Regular season				Postseason			
Team	Year	Won	Lost	Win %	Finish	Won	Lost	Win %	Result
MON	1981	16	11	.593	1st in NL East Second Half	5	5	.500	Lost to Los Angeles Dodgers in NLCS
MON	1982	86	76	.531	3rd in NL East	–	–	–	–
MON	1984	14	16	.467	5th in NL East	–	–	–	–
Total		116	103	.530		5	5	.500	–

Sporting positions
Preceded by Franchise created	Montreal Expos General Manager; 1968–1976	Succeeded by Charlie Fox
