= Gerry Snyder =

Canadian politician (1920–2007)

Gerry Maurice Snyder (February 14, 1920 – November 26, 2007) was a Canadian politician from Montreal. He served on the Montreal City Council and was instrumental in bringing the Summer Olympics and Major League Baseball to Montreal.

== Early life and career ==
Snyder was born in Montreal on February 14, 1920. He graduated from Luke Callaghan High School and played junior hockey. He worked for the Royal Bank of Canada for three years and enlisted in the Royal Canadian Air Force in 1941.

After returning to Montreal, Snyder opened a sporting goods store on Queen Mary Road. He founded an amateur sports organization and played baseball. Snyder also patented and sold a safety guard for hockey skates to Bauer Hockey and served as president of the International Softball Federation.

== Montreal City Council ==
Snyder ran for a seat on the Montreal City Council for Snowdon as a member of the Civic Action League in 1957. He won the election. Snyder joined the Civic Party of Montreal started by mayor Jean Drapeau in 1960. He was allied with Drapeau, and was thought of as his "fixer". He was also vice chairman of the Montreal Executive Committee.

After the loss of the Montreal Royals, Snyder campaigned for an expansion team in Major League Baseball (MLB). He organized a leadership group that included Jean-Louis Lévesque and Charles Bronfman and presented Montreal's bid for an expansion team to MLB owners at the 1967 Winter Meetings. Their group was awarded a franchise, the Montreal Expos.

Snyder campaigned for the 1972 Summer Olympics, but Montreal's bid was not chosen. Montreal campaigned again for the 1976 Summer Olympics, and their bid was successful. He was in charge of financing the games.

In 1982, after 25 years, Snyder lost reelection to the city council. He was defeated by Marvin Rotrand. After the loss, he was appointed as commissioner with Société de transport de la communaute urbaine de Montreal. He served in the role until his retirement in 1987.

== Personal life ==
In 1988, Snyder sued the Montreal Gazette and five other organizations for libel after they called him a part of the "Jewish mafia". He won the suit and was awarded $310,000.

Snyder married Eileen Varnas. She died in 2003. They had five children.

Snyder broke his hip in a fall on October 13, 2007. He died at Lakeshore General Hospital on November 26.

Snyder was posthumously elected to the Canadian Baseball Hall of Fame in 2025.
