= William Humber =

William Humber CM
- Born: September 9, 1949 (age 77); Toronto, Ontario
- Education: University of Toronto, York University
- Occupations: Author, historian, educator
- Writing career
- Language: English
- Genres: Sports, history, environment
- Subjects: Baseball, soccer, environment, history
- Baseball career

Member of the Canadian

Baseball Hall of Fame
- Induction: 2018

William Arthur Humber CM (born September 9, 1949 in Toronto, Ontario) is a Canadian sports historian, author, journalist, environmentalist, and educator.

== Personal profile ==
Humber was born in Toronto, Ontario. He earned a bachelor of arts degree from the University of Toronto in 1972, and a master's degree in environmental studies from York University in 1975. Humber worked at Seneca College from 1977 to 2018, where he served as a department chair, and the director of Eco-Seneca Initiatives, the college's department devoted to environmental educational initiatives.

== Writing ==
Humber is the author of several books on baseball, sports, the environment, and his hometown of Bowmanville, Ontario.

== Baseball historian ==
Humber currently serves as a selector for the Canadian Baseball Hall of Fame, and was a selector for Canada's Sports Hall of Fame and the Clarington Sports Hall of Fame. In 1989, he was a subject specialist at the Royal Ontario Museum for an exhibit on baseball. Humber was inducted in the Canadian Baseball Hall of Fame on June 16, 2018. He was appointed a member of the Order of Canada in 2021, and was inducted into the Ontario Baseball Association Hall of Fame in 2025.

== Books by Humber ==
- Cheering for the Home Team: The Story of Baseball in Canada, Boston Mills Press (Erin, Ontario), 1983.
- Freewheeling: The Story of Bicycling in Canada, Boston Mills Press, 1986.
- (With Doris Falls) The History of Central Public School in Bowmanville, Josten's (Topeka, KS), 1989.
- Let's Play Ball: Inside the Perfect Game, Lester and Orpen, 1989.
- The Baseball Book and Trophy, Somerville House, 1993.
- The Kids' Soccer Book and Medallion, Somerville House, 1994.
- Diamonds of the North: A Concise History of Baseball in Canada, Oxford University Press (New York, NY), 1995.
- (With John St. James) All I Thought about Was Baseball: Essays on a Canadian Pastime, University of Toronto Press (Toronto), 1996.
- Bowmanville: A Small Town at the Edge, Natural Heritage, 1997.
- A Sporting Chance, Dundurn Press, 2004.
- (With Darryl Humber) Let it Snow: Keeping Canada's Winter Sports Alive, Dundurn Press, 2009.
- (With Velma Grover and Gail Krantzberg) The Regeneration Imperative: Revitalization of Built and Natural Assets, CRC Press, 2016.
- (With Bradley Humber) Soccer Triumphant, St. Johann Press, 2022.
- (With Wendy Simone Shoen, and John Simone) Tex Simone: The Man Who Saved Baseball in Syracuse, Wildebeest Publishing, 2024.
- Old Ontario at Bat: Baseball's Unheralded Ancestry, Centre for Canadian Baseball Research, 2024.
