= Duguayville, New Brunswick =

Coordinates: 47.605333°N 65.054306°W

Location of Duguayville in New Brunswick

Duguayville is a community in the Canadian province of New Brunswick. It is situated in Saint-Isidore Parish, a parish of Gloucester County.

== See also ==
- List of communities in New Brunswick
