= John McHale =

John McHale may refer to:

- John McHale (baseball) (1921–2008), American baseball player and Major League Baseball executive
- John McHale (footballer) (1915–2003), Australian rules football player
- John McHale (artist) (1922–1978), British artist, sociologist and specialist of future studies
- John McHale Jr., American lawyer and Major League Baseball executive; son of the baseball player

== See also ==
- John MacHale (1791–1881), Irish Roman Catholic archbishop
