= Murray Cook (baseball) =

Canadian baseball scout

- Born: December 6, 1940 (age 85); Sackville, New Brunswick, Canada
- Occupation: Baseball executive
- Baseball career
- Stats at Baseball Reference

Member of the Canadian

Baseball Hall of Fame
- Induction: 2014

George Earl Murray Cook (born December 6, 1940) is a Canadian scout and former front office executive in Major League Baseball. He was the general manager of three MLB teams: the New York Yankees (1981–84); the Montreal Expos (1984–87); and the Cincinnati Reds (1988–1990).

== Pirates and Yankees ==
Cook began his baseball career as an infielder in the Pittsburgh Pirates farm system in 1962. He then became a scout and farm system administrator, serving Pittsburgh as assistant director of Minor League operations (1972–77), then director of scouting (1977–79). He was named the Yankees' scouting director in January 1980.

== Yankees ==
Cook was promoted to general manager of the New York Yankees on June 30, 1983, succeeding Bill Bergesch. With manager Billy Martin at the helm, the 1983 Yankees showed a marked improvement, posting a 91-71 record, good for third place. However, George Steinbrenner fired Martin for the third time after the season, and brought in Yogi Berra as the new manager for 1984. Cook had little say in these matters.

Cook earned Steinbrenner's wrath when the Oakland Athletics selected pitcher Tim Belcher from the Yankees in the free agent compensation draft on February 8, 1984. Belcher had been the first player selected in the 1983 amateur draft but had refused to sign with the Minnesota Twins at the time; the Yankees had scored a coup by selecting him in the secondary phase of the January 1984 amateur draft and signing him to a contract a few days later. However, they had already submitted their list of protected players for the free agent draft and were unable to add the newly signed Belcher, leading to his selection by the Athletics.

A furious Steinbrenner reduced Cook's responsibilities, leaving a void in the front office until he named Clyde King as his replacement on April 9. Cook inherited the title of vice-president and director of scouting in the shuffle, with Steinbrenner saying. "I take the blame of asking a young man to move too fast too soon". He stayed in that role for almost five months until he submitted his resignation on August 20, 1984, explaining that he wanted to have a decision-making role again.

== Expos ==
On August 30, the Montreal Expos fired manager Bill Virdon, followed five days later by general manager John McHale. Cook was hired on September 5. His first action after taking over was to hire Buck Rodgers, who had just won the Minor League Manager of the Year Award by leading the Expos' AAA farm team, the Indianapolis Indians to a 91-63 record and the American Association championship.

Due to a tight budget set by the Expos ownership, Cook had to rely on trades instead of signing free agents. He traded away Gary Carter, Bill Gullickson, and Jeff Reardon in order to acquire promising minor league talent. He became known for picking up prospects that other teams were willing to discard, such as Dennis Martínez and Pascual Pérez. He also used the Rule 5 draft to acquire Jeff Parrett.

=== Scandal ===
On August 11, 1987, the Expos called a hasty press conference to announce Cook had been fired and Vice-President for Baseball Administration Bill Stoneman was taking over as general manager. Over the next few weeks, rumours began circulating that the firing was not for baseball reasons. In fact, Cook had been dismissed for having an affair with Pamela Brochu, wife of Expos President and CEO Claude Brochu. Cook broke up with his wife of many years to marry his former boss's wife.

== Reds ==
At the start of the 1988 season, Cook was hired to replace Bill Bergesch, the same man he had replaced in New York, as GM of the Cincinnati Reds. They finished second in 1988 and won three more games than the previous season. However, in 1989 the Reds fell to fifth due to the turmoil surrounding manager Pete Rose being banned from baseball. Cook was replaced by Bob Quinn after the season. The year after Cook was let go, the Reds won the World Series.

== Later career ==
From 2002 through 2006, Cook was a major league scout for the Boston Red Sox, joining Boston after nearly a decade as a scout for the Florida Marlins. Since the 2007 season, he has been the East Coast regional crosschecker for the Detroit Tigers.

On Saturday June 21, 2014, Cook was inducted into the Canadian Baseball Hall of Fame, in St. Marys, Ontario, along with former Montreal Expos announcer Dave Van Horne and their popular long time slugging third baseman Tim Wallach.

Sporting positions
Preceded by Bill Bergesch	New York Yankees General Manager; 1983–1984	Succeeded by Clyde King
Preceded by John McHale	Montreal Expos General Manager; 1985–1987	Succeeded by Bill Stoneman
Preceded by Bill Bergesch	Cincinnati Reds General Manager; 1988–1989	Succeeded by Bob Quinn
