= David Samson =

David Samson may refer to:

- David Samson (rabbi) (born 1956), Orthodox rabbi
- David Samson (baseball) (born 1968), president of the Florida Marlins
- David Samson (lawyer) (born 1939), American politician who served as New Jersey Attorney General, 2002–2003, and PANYNJ Chairman, 2011–2014

== See also ==
- David Sampson (disambiguation)
