= David Sampson =

David Sampson is the name of:

- David A. Sampson (born 1957), U.S. Deputy Secretary of Commerce
- David Sampson (composer) (born 1951), American composer
- Dave Sampson (1941–2014), singer
- David Sampson (politician), American state legislator
- David Sampson (rugby league) (1947–2021), rugby league footballer and coach

== See also ==
- David Samson (disambiguation)
