= 2001 Major League Baseball contraction plan =

Attempt to eliminate two teams from Major League Baseball

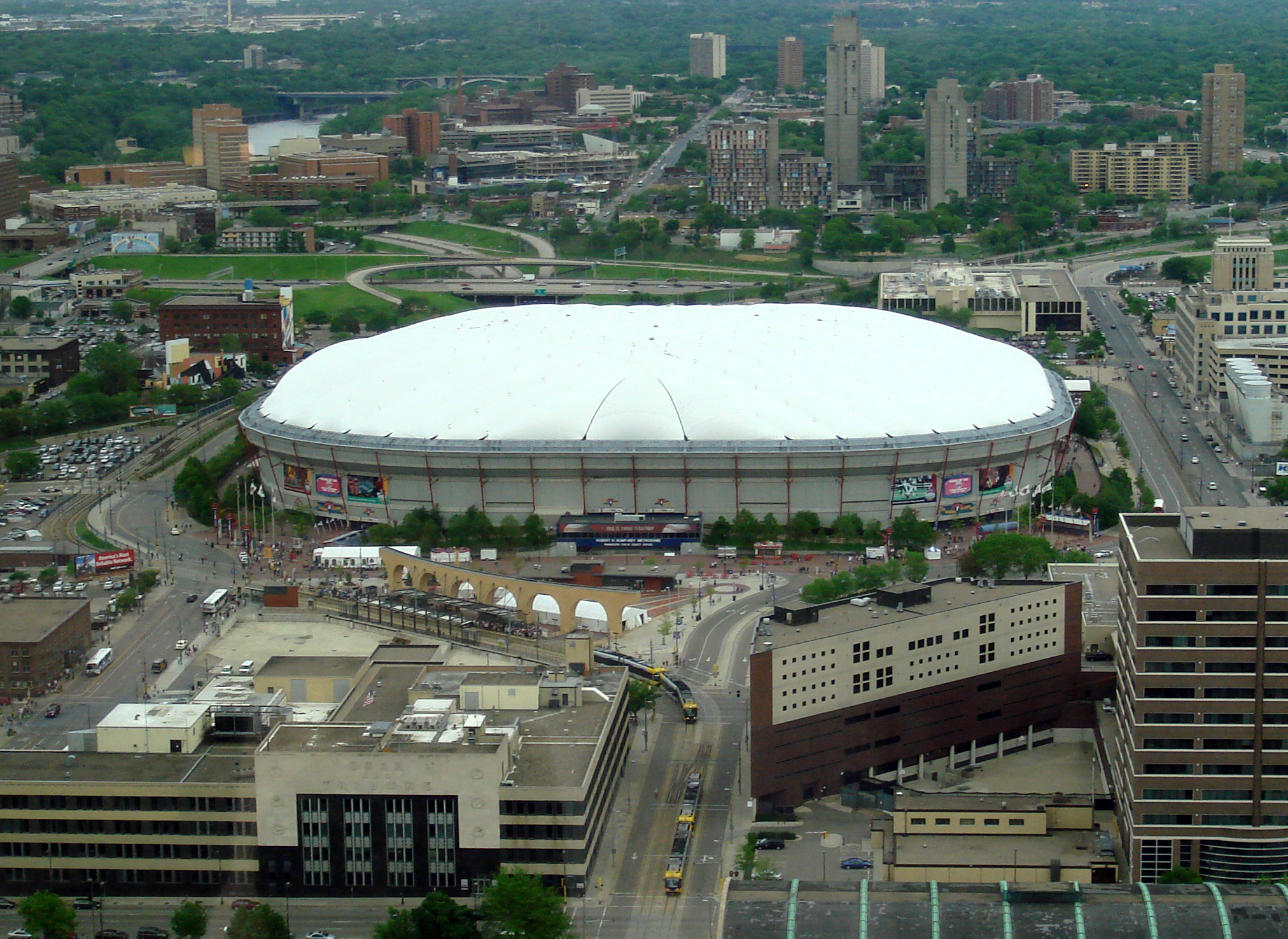
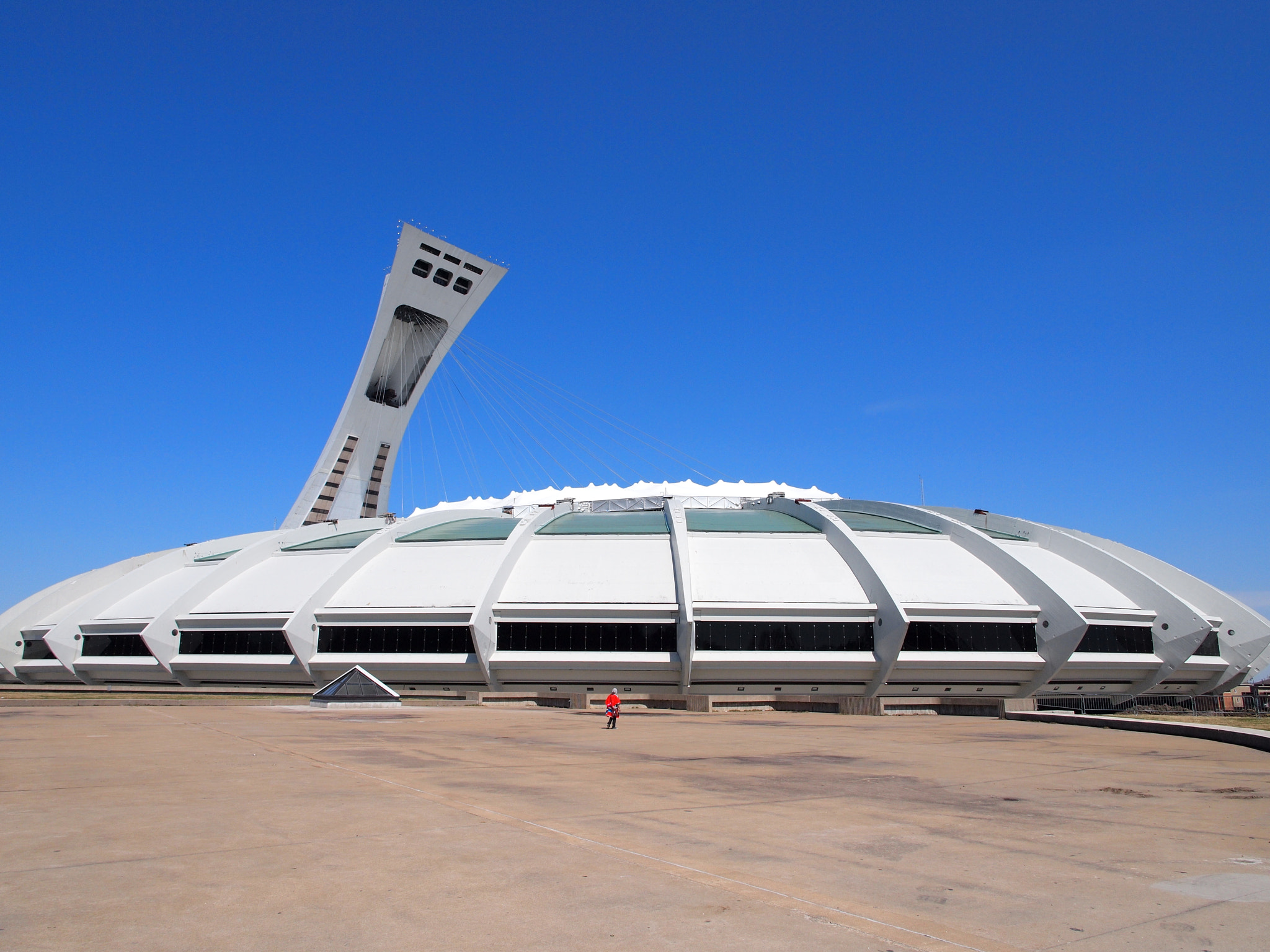
The Hubert H. Humphrey Metrodome (top) and Olympic Stadium (bottom), considered outdated by MLB in 2001

On November 6, 2001, the owners of the 30 teams in Major League Baseball (MLB) voted to contract, or eliminate, two teams for the 2002 season. According to Commissioner Bud Selig, the decision was made due to economic reasons, as the teams targeted for contraction, reportedly the Minnesota Twins and the Montreal Expos, had "a long record of failing to generate enough revenues to operate a viable major league franchise." Also factored into the contraction plan was the two teams' inability to fund the construction of new ballparks to replace the outdated Hubert H. Humphrey Metrodome and Olympic Stadium.

The contraction plan fell through due to a court injunction compelling the Twins to honor their lease with the Metrodome, as well as challenges by the players' labor union, the Major League Baseball Players Association (MLBPA). The Expos were later purchased by Major League Baseball. The Twins eventually secured funding for a new stadium that opened in 2010, while the Expos relocated to Washington, D.C. in 2005 and were renamed the Washington Nationals, later being purchased by Ted Lerner and moving to a new stadium of their own.

If the plan had gone through, it would have been the first contraction by a major North American professional sports league since the National Hockey League merged the Cleveland Barons into the Minnesota North Stars in 1978, and the first contraction by MLB since 1899.

== Background ==
=== Minnesota Twins ===
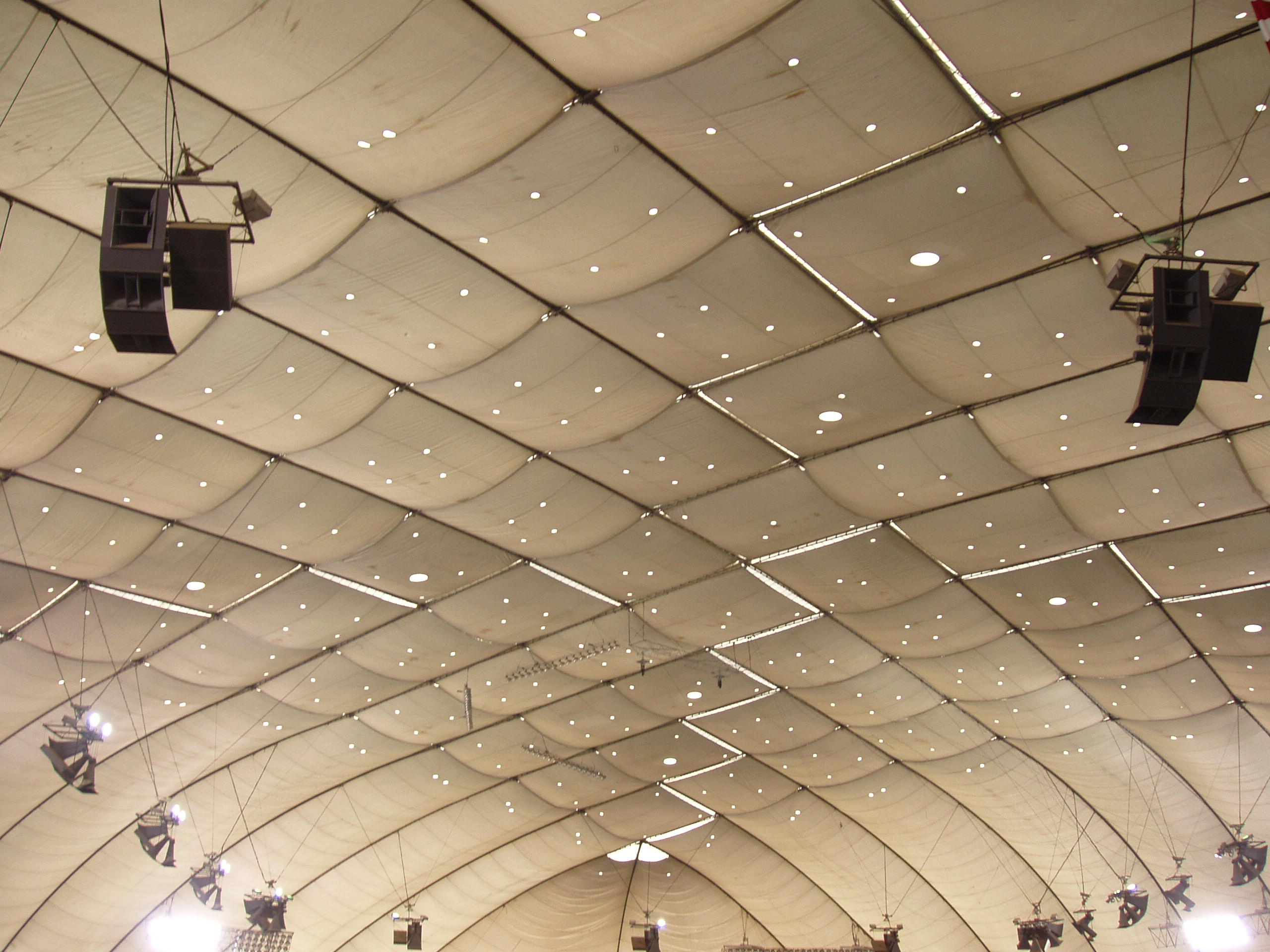
Metrodome roof (1982–2010)

The Minnesota Twins began playing at the Metrodome in the 1982 season after playing for 21 seasons at Metropolitan Stadium. During their tenure at the Metrodome, the Twins won the World Series in 1987 and 1991. Nevertheless, the multipurpose stadium, which the Twins shared with the Minnesota Vikings of the National Football League, had poor sightlines when the field was set for baseball, and the Twins received no revenue from signage, luxury suites, or parking. Additionally, the white, air-supported roof not only caused many fielders to have trouble tracking fly balls, but it also deflated due to heavy snow on numerous occasions.

By the start of the 1990s, the Metrodome was already considered obsolete. During the 1990s and early 2000s, the Twins were often rumored to be moving to such places as Sacramento, California; Orlando, Florida; Nashville, Tennessee; and others in search of a more financially competitive market. In 1997, team owner Carl Pohlad arranged an agreement to sell the Twins to Don Beaver, who would relocate the team to the Piedmont Triad region of North Carolina, but the deal was abandoned when a referendum for funding a new ballpark was not approved by North Carolina voters.

There was also some speculation that Selig targeted the Twins because of his family's ownership of the Milwaukee Brewers, the next closest team to the Minneapolis–Saint Paul area, which was set to potentially gain the Twins' market should the team be dissolved.

=== Montreal Expos ===
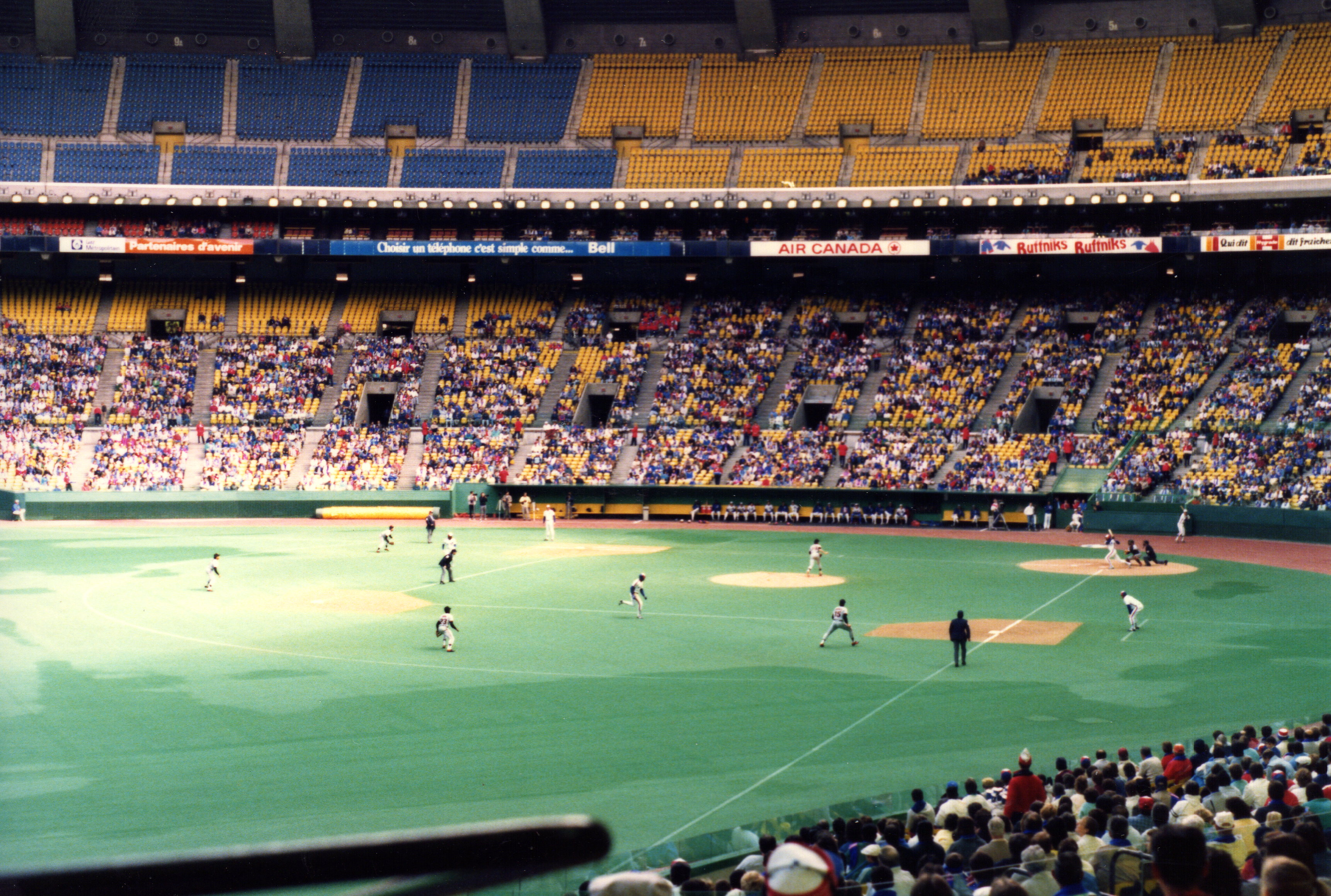
Olympic Stadium during an Expos game in 1986

Olympic Stadium was originally constructed as a multipurpose venue for the 1976 Summer Olympics, which Montreal hosted. The Montreal Expos began playing full-time at the stadium in the 1977 season, one year after the stadium's opening and the team's ninth year of play. Although the new stadium was an upgrade from Jarry Park Stadium, Olympic Stadium was still fraught with problems. A retractable roof that was scheduled to be finished when the Expos moved in was not finished until 1987 and began to leak within only a few years. In 1991, support beams collapsed and a 55-ton slab of concrete crashed onto a walkway outside the stadium, forcing the Expos to play their final 13 home games that year on the road.

The stadium's poor conditions contributed to low attendance in Montreal. Throughout the 1990s, the Expos ranked near the bottom in the National League for attendance, including ranking last in each of their final seven seasons in Montreal. Owner Jeffrey Loria was unable to reach an agreement for television and English-speaking radio coverage to increase the team's broadcasting revenue, and his proposal for a new downtown ballpark was rebuffed by the Quebec government.

== Owners vote for contraction ==
On November 6, 2001, the day before the active MLB labor agreement expired, MLB franchise owners met in Chicago to vote on contraction, despite earlier reports that no such vote would take place. The owners voted 28–2 in favor of contraction, with the Twins and Expos casting the dissenting votes. Although the Florida Marlins, Tampa Bay Devil Rays, and Oakland Athletics had been discussed as candidates for elimination, the Expos and Twins were considered the likeliest teams to be folded. The owners of both teams were set to receive $250 million buyouts to let MLB take control of and fold their franchises. The plan also included division realignment so that each league would have an even number of teams. In the plan, the Texas Rangers would move to the American League Central, the Pittsburgh Pirates would move to the National League East, and the Arizona Diamondbacks would move to the American League West.

Proposed Divisions
American League
East
East	Baltimore Orioles	Boston Red Sox	New York Yankees	Tampa Bay Devil Rays	Toronto Blue Jays
Central
Central	Chicago White Sox	Cleveland Indians	Detroit Tigers	Kansas City Royals	Texas Rangers
West
West	Anaheim Angels	Arizona Diamondbacks	Oakland Athletics	Seattle Mariners	
National League
East
East	Atlanta Braves	Florida Marlins	New York Mets	Philadelphia Phillies	Pittsburgh Pirates
Central
Central	Chicago Cubs	Cincinnati Reds	Houston Astros	Milwaukee Brewers	St. Louis Cardinals
West
West	Colorado Rockies	Los Angeles Dodgers	San Diego Padres	San Francisco Giants	

== Aftermath ==
Major League Baseball Players Association (MLBPA) executive director Donald Fehr noted that the players' union had no say in the matter and called the decision "imprudent and unfortunate...We had hoped that we were in a new era, one that would see a much better relationship between players and owners. Today's announcement is a severe blow to such hopes." The MLBPA filed a grievance to block contraction the day after the vote. On November 16, the league's contraction plans were shelved when Hennepin County Judge Harry Crump ruled that the Minnesota Twins must honor their lease and play their final season at the Metrodome, citing the team's importance to the community. Had only the Expos been contracted, there would have been an odd number of teams in the two leagues, meaning one team would have to be idle every day. This would have made it impossible to preserve a 162-game schedule within the normal six-month season.

By December 13, talks about contraction had ended, and on January 12, 2002, it was announced that no teams would be eliminated for the upcoming season.

On January 16, Loria sold the Expos to Major League Baseball for $120 million. MLB formed Expos Baseball L.P., a partnership of the other 29 clubs, to operate the Expos. Loria then bought the Florida Marlins from John W. Henry for $158 million, using the proceeds from the Expos sale plus a $38.5 million no-interest loan from MLB. Henry then bought the Boston Red Sox from the Yawkey Trust. It was officially announced on February 5 that plans for contraction had been abandoned. On August 30, the owners and players approved a new collective bargaining agreement that forbade contraction until 2006.

With no plans for a new ballpark in Montreal, Major League Baseball looked into relocating the Expos. Cities that expressed interest in the team included Washington, D.C.; Las Vegas, Nevada; Norfolk, Virginia; Monterrey, Nuevo León, Mexico; and Portland, Oregon. On September 29, 2004, Major League Baseball announced that the Expos would relocate to Washington, D.C. for the 2005 season. MLB franchise owners voted 28–1 in favor of the move, with the Baltimore Orioles casting the lone dissenting vote. The team, re-branded as the Washington Nationals and being sold to Ted Lerner in 2006, played their first three seasons at Robert F. Kennedy Memorial Stadium before moving into the newly constructed Nationals Park in 2008.

On May 26, 2006, Minnesota Governor Tim Pawlenty signed a bill that approved funding for a new $522 million ballpark, to which the Twins agreed to contribute $130 million. The new stadium, named Target Field, opened in April 2010.
