= Bill Bergesch =

American baseball executive (1921–2011)

- Born: June 17, 1921; St. Louis, Missouri, U.S.
- Died: May 10, 2011 (aged 89); Stamford, Connecticut, U.S.
- Occupation: Baseball executive

Louis William Bergesch (June 17, 1921 – May 10, 2011) was an American Major League Baseball executive. Beginning as a minor league front-office executive and scouting director in the St. Louis Cardinals organization, he would serve in a variety of management and front office roles over a career spanning almost five decades, except for a brief period spent as president of one of the first professional soccer league teams to be established in the United States, the New York Generals. Returning to baseball however, Bergesch would ultimately serve as a senior front office executive or general manager for several major league teams, including most prominently, the Cincinnati Reds and the New York Yankees.

== Early life ==
Bergesch was a native of St. Louis, Missouri. He attended Washington University in St. Louis prior to the attack on Pearl Harbor, but joined the U.S. Army in early 1942. He served in the First Special Service Force, a unit trained for specialized assault and mountain combat, and a precursor to the U.S. Army Green Berets. He obtained the non-commissioned rank of Platoon Sergeant, and served in combat in North Africa, Sicily, and Italy. In North Africa, he landed as part of the Operation Torch landings, and received his first Purple Heart. Later, he landed at Salerno, as part of Operation Avalanche. He was again wounded, this time seriously, during the disastrous attempted crossing of the Gari (river) known as the Battle of Rapido River in January, 1944, that battle occurring in the opening stages of the larger, simultaneous Battle of Monte Cassino, which continued until May. Bergesch received a second Purple Heart. He was, however, paralyzed on the right side of his body for a substantial period of time.

He was returned to the U.S. and was discharged the service 15 June 1944. He then returned to Washington University, where he graduated in 1946, with a bachelor's degree in business administration. Bergesch was admitted to and briefly attended Washington University School of Law, but withdrew after less than one full academic year, in order to pursue other opportunities in professional baseball management.

In his career at Washington University, both before and after World War II, he played varsity football, basketball, and track. Attempting to return to playing football post-war, Bergesch made the team, but due to his injury was unable to complete the season, re-injuring his shoulder in the fourth game of the season playing against Ohio State University. Similarly, although also attempting to return to playing basketball after the war, he found he was unable to raise his right arm to shoot. Bergesch taught himself to play left-handed, made the team and continued to play, and was named team captain in his senior year. He married Virginia Kammerer, another graduate of Washington University and St. Louis native, in 1947.

== Baseball career ==
In 1947, Bergesch joined the St. Louis Cardinals organization. He was sent to Albany, Georgia, to serve as general manager of a local franchise team owned by the Cardinals. For the next decade, he served in similar roles with other Redbird minor league clubs, including the Omaha Cardinals, one of two Triple-A teams in the Cardinals minor league system. While at Omaha, Bergesch signed future Hall of Fame pitcher Bob Gibson from Creighton University

Bergesch was called to the St Louis head office in 1960. In 1961 he joined the Kansas City Athletics, recently purchased by Charles O. Finley, as assistant general manager to Frank Lane. In 1962, Bergesch moved to the New York Mets, their first season, as assistant general manager and director of minor league operations, where he was largely responsible for building a farm system for the new team.

== First tenure with the Yankees ==
In 1964, Bergesch joined the New York Yankees as manager of stadium operations. Prior to the beginning of the season, the Yankees' traveling secretary, Bruce Henry, was stricken with a serious illness; as a result, Bergesch was given the additional responsibilities until Henry's return late in the season. He remained with the Yankees during the CBS era through 1968.

== Professional soccer ==
He became president of the New York Generals of the National Professional Soccer League in 1968. The NPSL played for two seasons before merging with the United Soccer Association to form the North American Soccer League (NASL). Bergesch at this point moved to the New York Cosmos, where his greatest accomplishment was to be the successful signing of Brazilian soccer legend Pelé out of semi-retirement to play in America for the New York Cosmos.

== Second tenure with the Yankees ==
Bergesch rejoined the Yankees in 1977 as director of scouting. He was promoted to vice president of baseball operations – and served in actuality as general manager in 1983, although he formally retained the previous title. Bergesch received 1977 and 1978 World Series rings from this period of engagement with the Yankees. Responsible for the conduct of the 1979 draft, Bergesch would leave a mark on the following decade and a half of Yankees baseball by drafting Don Mattingly.

In the 1982 draft, in a move which - if consummated - would have re-written the legacy of a further prominent athlete of the next decade in American professional sports, Bergesch also attempted to sign Bo Jackson directly out of high school. Jackson, however, elected to act upon his football scholarship offer from Auburn University. Jackson did not do so specifically due to a choice to value football over baseball, but rather in fulfilment of a promise made by Jackson to his mother, that he would be the first member of his family to attend college. At Auburn, and playing football, Jackson would win in 1985 the Heisman Trophy, the Walter Camp Award, SEC Player of the Year, and have his number retired. However, never having fully given up baseball, which he also continued to play at Auburn, after graduation Jackson proceeded to embark upon his astonishing career as a multi-sport professional athlete. Bizarrely, despite being drafted in the first round by the Tampa Bay Buccaneers in 1986, the reigning Heisman winner declined to sign, and instead made himself available for the 1986 MLB draft. He would thus be drafted in the seventh round of the 1987 draft, with the 183rd pick, by the Oakland Raiders. Jackson would not only play, but excel in both the NFL and MLB, playing in the NFL for the Raiders from 1987 to 1990, and for various MLB teams - most prominently the Kansas City Royals - after being drafted by them in the 1986 draft. Bergesch however, by that time, was no longer with the Yankees; instead presiding over the 1986 draft as General Manager of the Reds, Bergesch instead was focused upon acquiring much-needed pitching. In any event, Jackson's football and baseball careers would directly overlap between 1987 and 1990, with Jackson playing for both leagues.

== Cincinnati Reds ==
He left the Yankees in 1984, moving to Cincinnati as executive vice president and general manager of the Cincinnati Reds. In 1984 the Reds finished 5th in the NL west, but finished 2nd in 1985, 1986, and 1987. During his tenure, Pete Rose was the field Manager, but was also a listed as a player on the Reds roster through the 1986 season, when he set the all-time MLB record for base hits. Bergesch attempted to build the team around a core of highly regarded young players, in addition to veterans like Dave Parker and Terry Francona. In the 1985 amateur draft, with the fourth overall pick of the first round, Bergesch drafted future-Hall of Fame shortstop Barry Larkin, who would break into the majors by mid-August 1986 and almost immediately perform at the major league level, hitting .283 in 41 games. However, Bergesch was otherwise unable to capitalize on an excess of young and highly touted position players including Kurt Stillwell, Tracy Jones, and Kal Daniels, under circumstances which compelled him to trade them for pitching. Despite the emergence of Tom Browning as Rookie of the Year in 1985, winning 20 games, the Reds would finish second in the National League West, missing the playoffs. In 1986, the pitching rotation was devastated by the early demise of Mario Soto's career to arm injury, and the Reds again finished in second place. 1987 saw, again, the same result, and Bergesch was fired on October 12, 1987, prior to the conclusion of the playoffs.

== Final tenure with the Yankees ==
Bergesch rejoined the Yankees in 1991, first on a consulting basis, and then more formally, although his responsibilities were only loosely defined. Bill Madden in his book "Steinbrenner" depicts Bergesch as having a backroom advisory presence during this period, which set the stage for the Yankees' periods of dominance later in the decade. Bergesch received a third World Series ring for the 1996 season, and formally retired in early 1997.

== Later life ==
Bergesch continued to attend the Yankees' spring training in Tampa, Florida, through 2008. After the death of his wife Virginia in 2006, he moved to a retirement community in Stamford, Connecticut. Bergesch died on May 10, 2011, at age 89.

Sporting positions
Preceded by Gene Michael	New York Yankees General Manager; 1982–1983	Succeeded by Murray Cook
Preceded by Bob Howsam	Cincinnati Reds General Manager; 1984–1987	Succeeded by Murray Cook
