= Montreal Expos =

Canadian MLB team (1969–2004)

- Les Expos de Montréal (French)

Logo	Cap insignia

Information
- League: National League (1969–2004); East Division (1969–2004)
- Ballpark: Jarry Park Stadium (1969–1976); Olympic Stadium (1977–2004); Hiram Bithorn Stadium (San Juan, Puerto Rico) (2003–2004)
- Established: 1969
- Relocated: 2005 (to Washington, D.C.; became the Washington Nationals)
- Nickname(s): The 'Spos, Nos Amours
- East Division titles: 1: 1981
- Colours: Red, white, blue
- Mascot: Souki (1978); Youppi! (1979–2004)
- Retired numbers: 8; 10; 10; 30; 42
- Ownership: List of owners: Charles Bronfman (1969–1990); Claude Brochu (1991–2001); Jeffrey Loria (2001–2002); Major League Baseball (2002–2004)
- General manager: List of general managers: Jim Fanning (1969–1976); Charlie Fox (1976–1978); John McHale (1978–1984); Murray Cook (1984–1987); Bill Stoneman (1987–1988); Dave Dombrowski (1988–1991); Dan Duquette (1991–1994); Kevin Malone (1994–1995); Jim Beattie (1995–2001); Larry Beinfest (2001–2002); Omar Minaya (2002–2004)
- Manager: List of managers: Gene Mauch (1969–1975); Karl Kuehl (1976); Charlie Fox (1976); Dick Williams (1977–1981); Jim Fanning (1981–1982, 1984); Bill Virdon (1983–1984); Buck Rodgers (1985–1991); Tom Runnells (1991–1992); Felipe Alou (1992–2001); Jeff Torborg (2001); Frank Robinson (2002–2004)
- Website: montreal.expos.mlb.com (2004 archive)

The Montreal Expos (French: Les Expos de Montréal) were a professional baseball team based in Montreal. The Expos were the first Major League Baseball (MLB) franchise located outside the United States. They played in the National League (NL) East division from 1969 to 2004.

Immediately after the minor league Triple-A Montreal Royals folded in 1960, political leaders in Montreal sought an MLB franchise, and when the National League evaluated expansion candidates for the 1969 season, it awarded a team to Montreal. Named after the Expo 67 World's Fair, the Expos originally played at Jarry Park Stadium before moving to Olympic Stadium in 1977. The Expos failed to post a winning record in any of the franchise’s first 10 seasons. The team won its only division title in the strike-shortened 1981 season, but lost the 1981 National League Championship Series (NLCS) to the Los Angeles Dodgers. The team was sold in 1991 by its majority, founding owner, Charles Bronfman, to a consortium headed by Claude Brochu. Felipe Alou was promoted to the team's field manager in 1992, becoming MLB's first Dominican-born manager. He led the team to four winning seasons, including 1994, where the Expos had the best record in baseball before a players' strike ended the season. Alou became the Expos leader in games managed (1,409).

After the 1994 strike, the Expos chose to sell off their best players, and attendance and interest in the team declined. Efforts to secure funding for a new ballpark were unsuccessful, and after a failed attempt to disband the team, Major League Baseball bought the Expos ahead of the 2002 season. In their final two seasons, the team played 22 home games each year at Hiram Bithorn Stadium in San Juan, Puerto Rico. On September 29, 2004, MLB announced the franchise would move to Washington, D.C., for the 2005 season, and the Expos played their final home game in Montreal before relocating and being renamed the Washington Nationals.

The Expos posted an overall win–loss record of 2,753–2,943–4 (.483) during their years in Montreal. Vladimir Guerrero leads the franchise in both home runs and batting average, and Steve Rogers in wins and strikeouts. Three pitchers threw four no-hitters: Bill Stoneman (twice), Charlie Lea, and Dennis Martínez, who pitched the 13th perfect game in Major League Baseball history. The Expos retired four numbers in Montreal, and nine former members have been elected to the National Baseball Hall of Fame, with Gary Carter, Andre Dawson and Tim Raines' plaques depicting them with Expos caps.

== History ==
=== Founding (1960–1968) ===
Professional baseball in Montreal dates back to 1890 when teams briefly played in the International Association. A second attempt at hosting a pro team failed in 1895. The Montreal Royals of the Eastern League were subsequently founded in 1897 and played 20 seasons. The Royals were revived in 1928 and were purchased by the Brooklyn Dodgers in 1939 to serve as one of their Triple-A affiliates. Under Dodgers' management, the Royals won seven International League championships and three Junior World Series titles between 1941 and 1958. In 1946, Jackie Robinson joined the Royals and led the team to a Junior World Series title in advance of his breaking baseball's color line one year later. By the late 1950s, the Royals' championship years were past, and faced with declining attendance, the team was sold and moved after the 1960 season as the Dodgers reduced the number of teams they maintained at the AAA level.

Almost immediately upon the Royals' demise, Montreal mayor Jean Drapeau and city executive committee chairman Gerry Snyder began their campaign for a Major League Baseball (MLB) team. The city had in 1933 been considered a leading candidate to acquire the St. Louis Browns and was late to submit its candidacy for a team before the National League's (NL) 1962 expansion. In 1967, they presented their bid to the league's owners at the winter meetings. Aiding Montreal's bid was that Walter O'Malley, who owned the Dodgers and formerly oversaw the Montreal Royals, was the chairman of the NL's expansion committee. On May 27, 1968, National League president Warren Giles announced the league would add expansion teams in San Diego and Montreal at a cost of US$10 million each.

With the franchise secured, Snyder built an ownership group of six partners led by financier Jean-Louis Lévesque and Seagram heir Charles Bronfman. Lévesque was originally tapped as chairman and the public face of the ownership group since he was a francophone. However, he bowed out, and Bronfman took over as chairman. The new group was faced with the immediate problem of finding a suitable facility in which to play for at least two years. Drapeau had promised the NL that a domed stadium–thought to be a must due to Montreal's cold weather in April, October and sometimes September–would be built by 1971. However, Snyder's successor as executive committee chairman, Lucien Saulnier, told Bronfman that Drapeau could not make such a guarantee on his own authority. As 1968 dragged on without movement from the city on a facility, Bronfman and his group threatened to walk away. While they had more than enough money between them to pay the first installment of the expansion fee, they wanted assurances that a park would be built before proceeding any further with the effort. Delorimier Stadium, which hosted the Royals, was rejected even as a temporary facility; it could not be expanded beyond its 20,000-seat capacity because it was in a residential area. The Autostade, home of the Canadian Football League's Montreal Alouettes, was ruled out due to the prohibitive cost of expanding it and adding a dome, as well as doubts that the city even had the right to make the needed renovations to the federally owned facility.

By August 1968, the NL owners had grown increasingly concerned about the unresolved stadium question, putting the franchise's future in doubt. There were rumours of awarding the franchise to Buffalo, New York, instead, whose War Memorial Stadium was ready to host a team. League president Warren Giles was reassured of Montreal's viability when shown a 3,000-seat community field in the centrally located Jarry Park that Drapeau proposed expanding to 30,000 seats as a temporary home for the Expos, at a cost of over C$1 million.

Several options for a team name were considered: "Royals" was a popular option with fans in honour of the minor-league Royals, but the name had already been taken by the Kansas City Royals. Other names considered included "Voyageurs" and "Nationals". The team settled on "Expos", a name with the same spelling in French and English, in recognition of the recently concluded Expo 67 World's Fair. Less than a year after the city was awarded a team, the Expos took to the field to begin the 1969 season.

=== Jarry Park years (1969–1976) ===
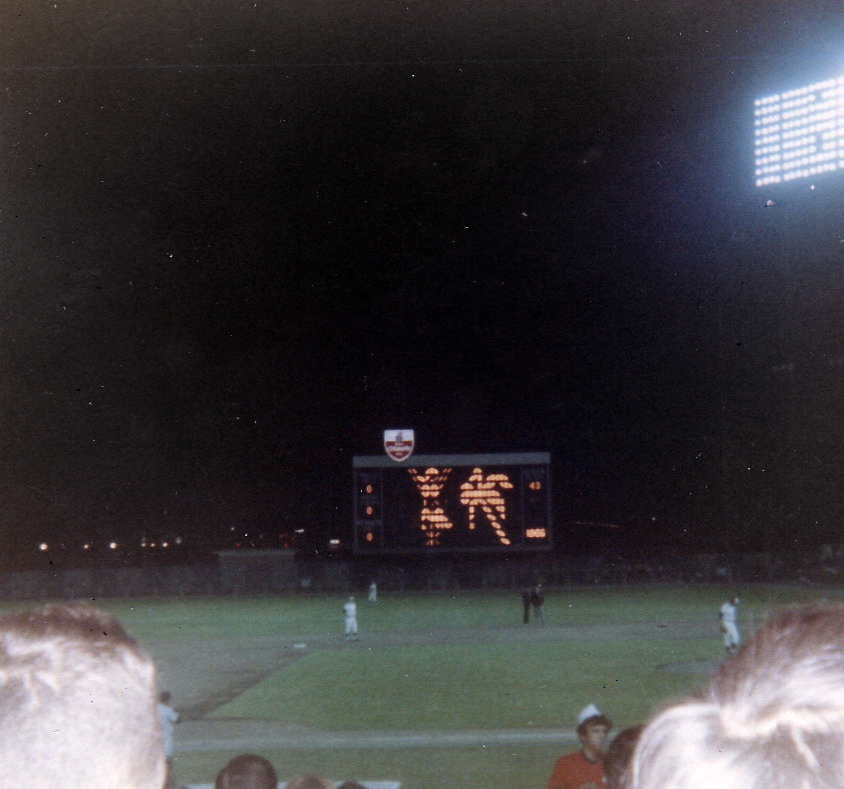
A game at Jarry Park, 1969

With Gene Mauch as their inaugural manager, the Expos made their debut on April 8, 1969: an 11–10 victory over the New York Mets at Shea Stadium. The team played its first home game—and the first Major League game outside the United States—on April 14; it was an 8–7 victory over the St. Louis Cardinals before 29,184 fans at Jarry Park Stadium. Three days later, on April 17, in just the team's ninth game played in their history up to that point, Bill Stoneman pitched the first no-hitter in Expos history with a 7–0 victory over the Philadelphia Phillies. The excitement of the early-season heroics quickly gave way to the realities of being an expansion team as the Expos struggled for much of their inaugural season. Montreal tied their expansion cousins, the San Diego Padres for the worst record in the NL with a record of 52–110 (.321). The team fared little better in the following seasons; the Expos went 73–89 in 1970 and 71–90 in 1971.

The team's best player, and first star, in its early seasons was Rusty Staub. Acquired from the Houston Astros in a trade before the Expos' inaugural season, he led the Expos with 30 home runs in 1970 and, owing to his red hair, was nicknamed Le Grand Orange. Staub was Montreal's lone representative at the All-Star Game in the team's first three seasons, and endeared himself to the local fans by learning French. Also popular was pitcher Claude Raymond, who completed his major league career with Montreal in 1972 and was the team's first French-Canadian star. Pitcher Carl Morton, who posted an 18–11 record in 1970, was the first player in franchise history to be named National League Rookie of the Year. Bill Stoneman threw his second no-hitter, and the first pitched outside the United States, in a 7–0 win over the New York Mets in Montreal on October 2, 1972.

The team failed to post a winning season in its first ten years and finished fifth or sixth in the six-team NL East eight times. Attendance declined as the initial excitement of having a team wore off. It recovered briefly in 1973 as the Expos mounted an unsuccessful charge at the NL East pennant, before declining sharply in 1974 and beyond. By 1976, attendance had dropped to just over 600,000 fans over the course of the season, less than half of what the Expos drew in their inaugural season.

The on-field performance was not the only concern for the Expos. Jarry Park was only intended to serve as a temporary home until 1971 at the latest. Even allowing for this, it left much to be desired as a baseball venue. The grandstands were completely exposed to the elements, forcing the Expos to postpone a number of early-season games. Additionally, the sun set directly in the face of first basemen, forcing delays. Due to numerous delays and cost overruns with its intended replacement, Olympic Stadium, the Expos were forced to stay in Jarry through 1976.

The team's future was also placed in doubt after an angry speech by Bronfman in which he threatened to move his family and the Seagram company outside Quebec if the separatist Parti Québécois (PQ) won a majority government in the 1976 Quebec election. The Parti Québécois did win the election; however, Bronfman and the Expos remained in Quebec.

=== The Big O and Blue Monday (1977–1981) ===
For the 1977 season, the Expos moved into their new ballpark, Olympic Stadium, six years later than originally scheduled. For a time in the 1976–77 offseason, however, it appeared that the Expos would have to play at least the early part of the season at Jarry Park due to delays in securing a lease for Olympic Stadium. The team broke off negotiations not long after the PQ's landslide victory in the 1976 provincial election. Negotiations dragged out through the winter, leading the Expos to begin selling 1977 season tickets under the assumption they would have to play at Jarry. However, an agreement was finally reached in early 1977. A total of 57,592 fans attended Montreal's opening day 7–2 loss to Philadelphia.

The new facility was a significant upgrade, although weather-related issues created by Montreal's harsh climate persisted until the stadium's roof was installed in 1987. Over the years, the stadium became notorious for its poor playing conditions. Players were frequently at risk for injury due to thin padding on the outfield fences, as well as the original artificial turf that remained in place for over two decades. Ultimately, the park became viewed as a white elephant. On the field, the Expos continued to fare poorly; the team won 75 games in 1977, and 76 in 1978.

Though the losing seasons mounted, the Expos built a solid core of players, led by Gary Carter, who went on to become one of baseball's best hitting catchers, pitcher Steve Rogers and outfielders Andre Dawson and Tim Raines. They supplemented their young roster with veteran acquisitions such as future Hall of Famer Tony Pérez, and in 1977, the Expos also hired Dick Williams as the team's manager. Williams had developed a reputation for nurturing young talent; he had managed a young Boston Red Sox team to the American League pennant in 1967 and the Oakland Athletics to back-to-back World Series titles in 1972 and 1973. In 1979, Montreal had its first winning season in franchise history; in mid-July, the Expos led the NL East by 6.5 games, before finishing second to the Pittsburgh Pirates by two games with a 95–65 record. The fans responded: Montreal drew two million fans for the first time in franchise history and it was the first of five consecutive seasons that the team was in the top-four of National League attendance. Though they won five fewer games in 1980 than the previous season, the Expos finished merely one game behind the Philadelphia Phillies for the division lead. In both seasons, the Expos were in the hunt for the division title into the last weekend of the season before losing to the ultimate World Series champion.

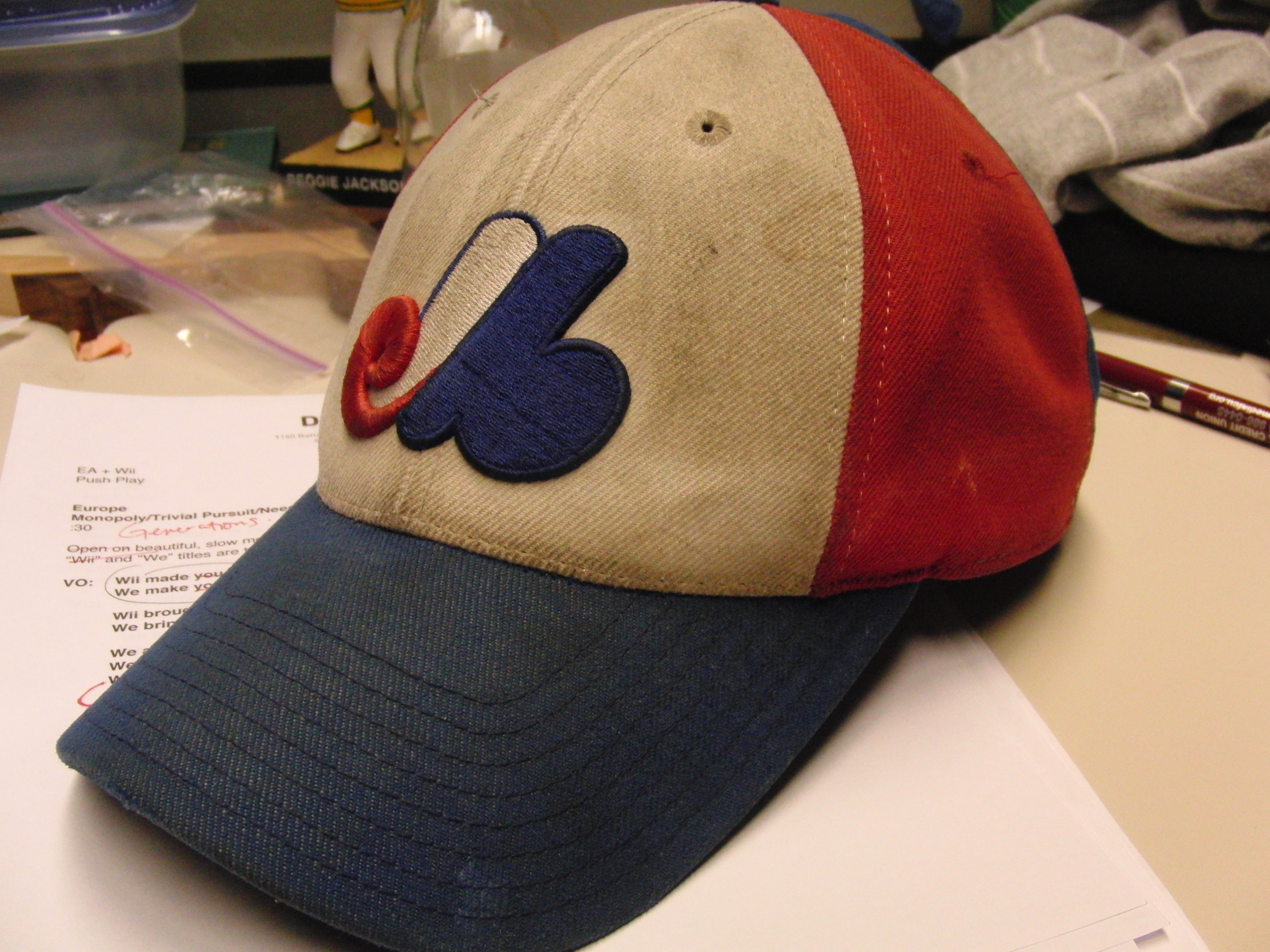
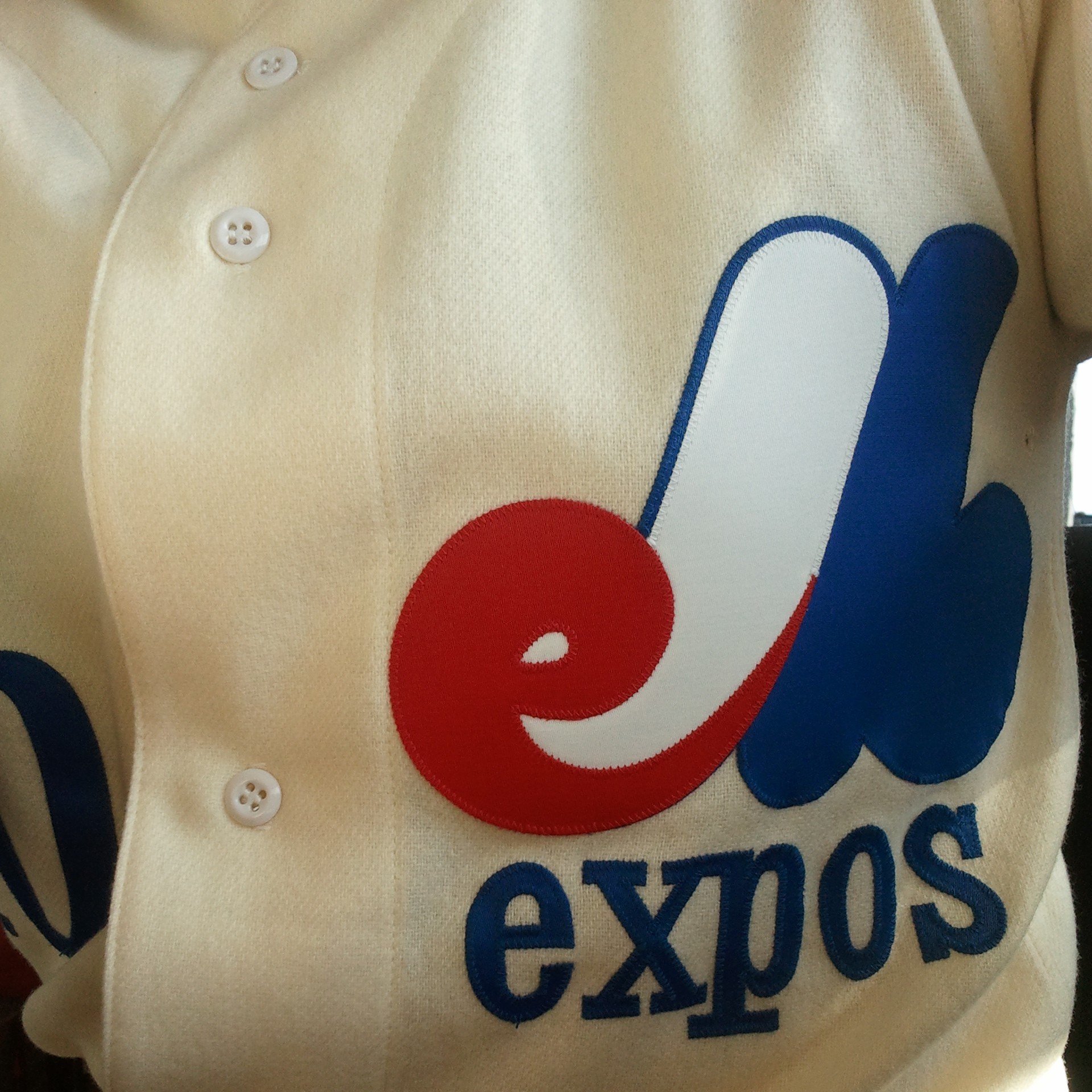
Baseball hat and home jersey worn by the Montreal Expos players from 1969 to 1991.

In 1981, Charlie Lea pitched the third no-hitter in franchise history. He defeated the San Francisco Giants by a 4–0 score on May 10, 1981. The Expos were in third place in the NL East with a 30–25 record when the season was halted for two months by a players' strike. By the time the strike ended, 713 games had been lost and could not possibly be made up. Major League Baseball chose to adopt a split-season schedule, which gave the Expos a fresh start in the second half of the season. With the team languishing near the .500 mark in post-strike play, the club fired Williams and replaced him with scouting director Jim Fanning. The team continued to struggle, though, and had a 19–19 record with 15 games left to play. Montreal won 11 of the remaining games and finished in first place, a 1/2 game ahead of the Pittsburgh Pirates, thereby qualifying for the franchise's first post-season berth. Terry Francona caught the final out – a fly ball hit by Dave Kingman – to seal a 5–4 victory over the New York Mets in the clinching game.

In the 1981 National League Division Series, the Expos faced the first-half winners, the defending world champion Phillies. Montreal won the first two games, at Olympic Stadium, by identical 3–1 scores before dropping the following two games in Philadelphia. In the deciding fifth game, Montreal's Steve Rogers faced Steve Carlton in a pitchers' duel. Rogers pitched a complete-game shutout as Montreal advanced to the 1981 National League Championship Series with a 3–0 win. Facing the Los Angeles Dodgers, Montreal split the first two games of the best-of-five series in Los Angeles before returning home for the final three games. Montreal won game three, but failed in their first attempt to close out the series by losing game four and set up a deciding fifth game. The deciding game, postponed by a day due to rain, was played October 19, 1981, in near-freezing temperatures. The game was tied at 1 entering the ninth inning when Fanning opted to have his top starter, Steve Rogers, come out of the bullpen to pitch. Rogers retired the first two batters before facing Rick Monday. What followed was the defining moment in Expos history: on a 3–1 count, Rogers hung a sinking fastball that Monday hit over the centrefield fence for the game-winning and series-clinching home run. The moment, and game, became known to Expos fans as "Blue Monday". The dramatic loss was a bitter defeat for a franchise who by that time had been adopted as Canada's most popular baseball team.

=== "The team of the '80s" (1982–1988) ===
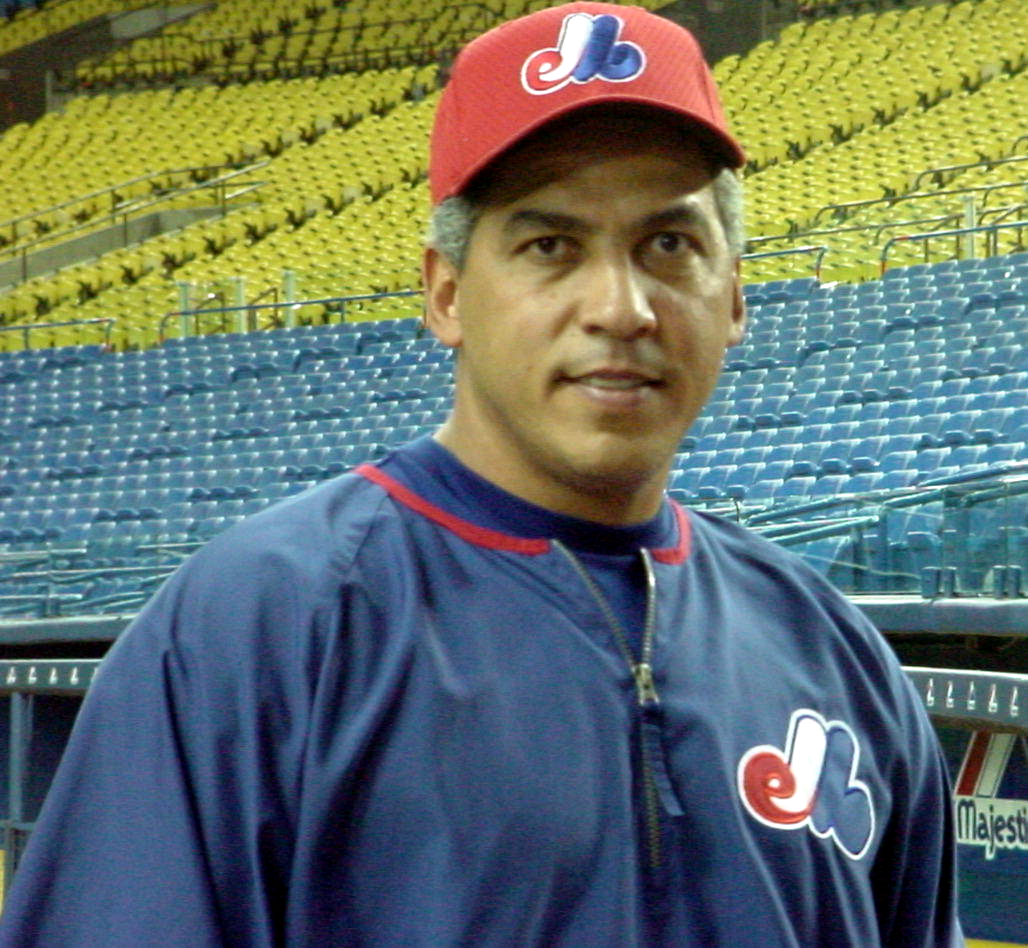
Andrés Galarraga, pictured here in 2002, also played with the Expos from 1985 to 1991.

By the end of the 1979 season, the Expos had earned a reputation for having one of the strongest player development systems in baseball; the team had stockpiled young talent throughout its roster including four starting pitchers below the age of 23, and was hailed as "the team of the '80s". When Montreal hosted the 1982 Major League Baseball All-Star Game on July 13, 1982, Expos fans voted four of their own into the starting lineup: Carter, Dawson, Raines and Rogers, while Al Oliver was named as a reserve. It was only the second time since 1969 the host team had four starters. The National League claimed a 4–1 victory in front of 59,057 fans in the first All-Star Game held outside the United States; Rogers was the winning pitcher. Baseball historian and author Jonah Keri argued in his book Up, Up and Away that "no one at the stadium could know it then, but baseball in Montreal peaked that night at the Big O."

The Expos were widely predicted to win the NL East in 1982; Sports Illustrated, Baseball Digest and The Sporting News were among the publications that favoured Montreal. However, the team disappointed. Montreal finished third in the division with 86 wins. The Expos replaced Fanning with Bill Virdon in 1983, and under their new manager, led the division in mid-July. However, the team faded down the stretch and finished with an 82–80 record. The Expos won more games between 1979 and 1983 than any other team in the NL East, but had only one postseason appearance to show for it.

Hoping to turn the team's fortunes around, the Expos signed 42-year-old veteran Pete Rose, who was second all-time in base hits to Ty Cobb, to a one-year contract in 1984. Rose reached a career milestone in Montreal's home opener by recording the 4,000th hit of his career in a 5–1 victory over Philadelphia on April 13. Though players and management had praised the acquisition of Rose and predicted he would help the team win the division, he was ineffective for Montreal. Rose batted only .259 and failed to hit a home run in 95 games before he was traded back to his original team, Cincinnati, and Montreal finished with a losing record on the season.

Montreal's failed 1984 season resulted in a 31 percent decrease in attendance at the same time salaries were escalating throughout baseball. As a consequence, the Expos completed a major trade after the season, sending Gary Carter to the New York Mets on December 10, 1984, in exchange for four players. In trading Carter, the Expos gave up a team icon who, like Rusty Staub before him, endeared himself to the fans by learning French and being one of the most accessible players on the team. The trade came one year after Bronfman had called the seven-year, US$12.6 million contract Carter signed in 1981 "the biggest mistake he had made in his life".

The economics of Major League Baseball also resulted in the departure of Andre Dawson after the 1986 season. Throughout that off-season, MLB owners colluded at the behest of Commissioner Peter Ueberroth to drive salaries for free agents down. Dawson, who should have been one of the most valuable free agents on the market that year, discovered that not only was there little interest in signing him, but that the Expos were publicly commenting about his knee problems in an effort to further drive interest down. Angered by these actions, Dawson walked into the Chicago Cubs' training camp with a signed, blank contract. The Cubs agreed to sign Dawson to a one-year, $500,000 contract, less than half of his previous salary. Dawson hit 49 home runs and drove in 137 runs in 1987, attaining the honour of NL Most Valuable Player.

Tim Raines was also affected by collusion: after receiving no offer worth more than the $1.5 million he earned in 1986, Raines returned to the Expos on a three-year, $5 million contract. He had one of the best seasons of his career in 1987, leading the NL with 123 runs (in 139 games), stealing 50 bases, batting .330 and hitting 18 home runs. He was also named the most valuable player of the 1987 Major League Baseball All-Star Game, as he drove in the game's only two runs with a triple in the 13th inning. Raines was ultimately traded to the Chicago White Sox in 1990.

=== "El Presidente, El Perfecto!" (1989–1993) ===
The Expos, wearing their powder blue road uniforms, face the St. Louis Cardinals in 1991

On the field, the Expos won just four games more than they lost between 1986 and 1991 as the organization set about rebuilding its development system and acquiring a new generation of players. The team struggled to attract free agents to Montreal, and Bronfman had grown disillusioned with both the business of baseball and the challenge of drawing fans to Olympic Stadium for a middling ball club. He hoped to take one more chance at winning a title, however, and in 1989, the Expos made a push for a division title by acquiring starting pitcher and pending free agent Mark Langston from the Seattle Mariners. The price would ultimately prove to be a high one as the Expos gave up future Hall of Famer Randy Johnson and two other pitchers. The trade helped propel the Expos to first place in the NL East by the All-Star break. They held the top spot into August before Langston and the team collapsed. The Expos finished fourth in the division with an 81–81 record, and Langston left Montreal as a free agent.

Bronfman grew increasingly uneasy about the reckless spending of his fellow team owners, increased strife with the players, and overall direction of MLB. According to then-team president Claude Brochu, the team's late-season decline in 1989 proved too much for Bronfman, who asked him to seek a buyer for the team.

Bronfman hoped to sell the team for around $50 million, but both he and Brochu found it impossible to find a local businessman willing to take primary ownership of the team. Groups from American cities were interested, however. One group offered to buy the club for $135 million and move it to Miami; however, Bronfman viewed a move as a last resort. Robert E. Rich Jr. offered to buy the club for $100 million and move it to the new Pilot Field in Buffalo, but received the same response. Instead, Brochu opted to lead a group himself. The city and the province agreed to fund $33 million of the $100 million sales price Bronfman had settled on, after which he and partner Jacques Ménard convinced 11 other Canadian businesses and businessmen—such as Bell Canada, Desjardins Group, the Jean Coutu Group and Loblaw Companies—to buy minority stakes. The sale was completed on November 29, 1990. However, many of the investors Brochu cajoled into joining the partnership made it clear that they considered their investments to be the equivalent of charitable donations, and were not interested in providing additional funding.

With a new ownership group in place, the Expos traded Tim Raines to the Chicago White Sox in a five-player deal. General manager David Dombrowski fired manager Buck Rodgers, who had managed the team since 1985, after the team started the 1991 season with a 20–29 record, replacing him with Tom Runnells. Mark Gardner pitched nine no-hit innings in a July 26, 1991 game before losing 1–0 in the 10th inning to the Los Angeles Dodgers. Two days later, also in Los Angeles, Dennis Martínez achieved a rare feat, throwing the 13th official perfect game in Major League Baseball history (based on MLB's 1991 redefinition of a perfect game), winning 2–0. Dave Van Horne's iconic call of "El Presidente, El Perfecto!" after the final out became a hallmark of Expos lore. Martinez's catcher, Ron Hassey, also caught Len Barker's perfect game ten years earlier and remains the only player to catch two perfect games in MLB history. The euphoria of the pitching feats did not last, as the Expos were rendered homeless for the final month of the season after a 50-ton beam collapsed from Olympic Stadium's structure and fell nine metres onto a public concourse hours before a motocross event on September 13. The Expos hinted that they would have to open the 1992 season elsewhere unless Olympic Stadium was certified safe. While the stadium itself was given a clean bill of health by engineers in November, it took longer to get one for the roof since it had been badly ripped in a June windstorm. Ultimately, it was decided to keep the roof closed at all times; it had only been opened 88 times in a little more than four years and could not be used in winds greater than 25 mph.

The Expos finished 1991 with a 71–90 record, sixth in the NL East, and drew fewer than one million fans for the first time since 1976. However, the future was brighter: Larry Walker, Marquis Grissom and Delino DeShields had joined the team, which then acquired Moisés Alou in a trade with Pittsburgh. Moises' father Felipe, who had been a longtime employee of the Expos, was promoted to manager during the 1992 season and became the first native of the Dominican Republic to manage an MLB team. In 1993, DeShields was sent to Los Angeles in exchange for Pedro Martínez; the deal was initially pilloried by the Montreal Gazette and other local publications as a move designed to save money rather than improve the ball club. Nonetheless, the Expos improved on the field; they won 87 games in 1992, 94 in 1993 and finished second in the NL East both seasons.

=== 1994 and the players' strike ===
"Most of my career, you'd go to the park that night, and hope you were going to win it. In '94, we pretty much knew were going to win it. Losing wasn't part of the equation. After the [All-Star] break, we played the Braves and beat 'em again. I remember leaving Atlanta, and we were just laughing. Like, 'This is our competition?!'"

— Larry Walker's retrospective of the 1994 Expos.

The Expos were recognized as having a strong team entering the 1994 season, but their hopes of winning the division were significantly impacted by realignment, as the three-time defending West Division champion Atlanta Braves were shifted to the East. Atlanta opened the season with 13 wins in 14 games, and quickly opened up an 8 1/2-game lead on Montreal. By late June, the Expos had moved to 2 1/2 games back when they hosted the Braves. Montreal won two out of three games in the series, including a late-game victory in the opener over future-Hall-of-Fame pitcher Greg Maddux that the players viewed as the turning point of their season. Montreal then embarked on a west coast road trip in which they won the final five games and entered the All-Star break in first place. The Expos pulled away from the Braves after the break; between July 18 and August 11, Montreal won 20 games and lost only three. For the second time in team history, five players were named all-stars: Moisés Alou, Wil Cordero, Darrin Fletcher, Marquis Grissom and Ken Hill.

An offence led by Marquis Grissom, Moises Alou, Larry Walker and Wil Cordero scored more than 5 runs per game. With a record of 74–40, on pace for a 106-win season as the pitching staff with Butch Henry, Ken Hill, Jeff Fassero and a young Pedro Martinez put up the National League's best ERA. The Expos had the best record in baseball on the morning of August 12, when MLB's players went on strike. The season began without a collective bargaining agreement as MLB's owners could not agree on how to share revenue between teams. Many teams were unwilling to agree to revenue sharing unless a salary cap was put in place, something which the Major League Baseball Players' Association (MLBPA) adamantly opposed. Unable to come to an agreement, the owners attempted to unilaterally force their system into effect, prompting the players to walk out. Most of the players believed they would be back on the field by Labour Day (celebrated on the same date in the U.S. as Labor Day) at the latest. On September 14, after a month of fruitless negotiations, the remainder of the season was cancelled. The franchise would never reach the playoffs as the Expos again.

From Brochu's perspective, a salary cap was not a major concern for the Expos as they could not afford to spend the maximum value of any negotiated cap. But when the strike ended eight months later, by the order of United States federal judge Sonia Sotomayor, the failure to implement strong revenue sharing was a major blow to the Expos. The team had already built a reputation as a penny-pinching organization (Larry Walker once complained in the media that the team asked the players to buy their own vitamins), with the second-lowest payroll in MLB in 1994. After the strike, the team launched a fire sale of players: Ken Hill, John Wetteland and Marquis Grissom were traded while Larry Walker was allowed to leave as a free agent. Moisés Alou, Pedro Martínez and Mel Rojas would eventually follow. In his book, My Turn At Bat, Brochu argued that the fire sale was the only viable option, since his partners in the ownership group were not interested in financing the team's losses. Brochu estimated that had he tried to keep the 1994 team together, the Expos would have lost $25 million in 1995, which would have pushed the franchise to the edge of bankruptcy. He claimed that he would have certainly kept Hill, Wetteland, Grissom and Walker had the partners been willing to put up the money necessary to keep them in Montreal. When Brochu told general manager Kevin Malone that Hill, Wetteland, Grissom and Walker all had to go, Malone tried to persuade Brochu to keep at least one of them. It was to no avail; Brochu told Malone that they all had to be off the roster by the deadline for salary arbitration—even though this made it all but impossible to get any leverage in possible deals. As a result, the Expos got almost nothing in return.

=== Decline (1995–2000) ===
The strike and ensuing fire sale left fans in Montreal livid. The Expos finished last in the NL East in 1995, and average game attendance fell by nearly 26%, from 24,543 to 18,189. Interest in the Expos continued to decline in the years that followed; they would never average more than 20,000 fans per game in a season again during their tenure in Montreal. While noting the Atlanta Braves went on to win 11 consecutive NL East titles after the strike, Jonah Keri expressed the viewpoint of the fans as it related to Brochu and the team's owners: "Expos fans couldn't help but wonder if that could have been them celebrating every year ... had Brochu convinced the team's cheapskate owners to spend a few damn dollars, or taken a leap of faith that short-term financial pain would lead to long-term success." The media, meanwhile, had taken to calling the Expos a "Triple-A team" as the team seemed to enter a period where they would develop players only to move them on to other organizations.

In spite of a sharp decline in attendance, Brochu claimed the Expos turned a small profit in 1995. While ticket sales increased in other markets in the seasons after the strike, though, Montreal's fan base continued to erode. Even with the loss of most of their best players, the Expos were competitive in 1996, achieving second place in the NL East with an 88–74 record. The team fared poorly in the following five seasons, however, finishing with a losing record in each year and no higher than fourth in the division. Individually, Pedro Martínez became the first native of the Dominican Republic—and only Expo—to win the National League Cy Young Award. He won the award in 1997 after recording an 18–7 record with an earned run average (ERA) of 1.90. One week after he was announced as the NL Cy Young winner, Martínez was traded to the Boston Red Sox as part of another salary purge.

As the 1990s wore on, interest in the Expos dwindled to the point that they were barely part of Montreal's sports landscape. Alou recalled in the latter part of the decade, an old friend of his who owned a team in the Dominican Republic came to Montreal for a visit and couldn't find any downtown store that sold Expos caps, nor did he see anyone wearing an Expos cap during his weeklong stay in the city. When he took a taxi to a game at Olympic Stadium, the driver couldn't find the entrance, and there were no signs anywhere touting games. According to Alou's friend, with such lackluster marketing, it was no surprise that the Expos couldn't attract any fans. Keri later wrote that the Expos would not have been in this position had a better-financed "champion" with the resources and the patience to shepherd the team through the 1990s bought the team.

Brochu attempted to convince his partners that the only long-term solution to keep the Expos in Montreal was to replace Olympic Stadium. In addition to being poorly located—far from population centres, restaurants, and bars—fans perceived it as cavernous and unsafe. Additionally, free agents were letting it be known they were not willing to play for the Expos because of Olympic Stadium's poor playing conditions. A proposed 35,000-seat downtown facility, to be called Labatt Park, was announced in 1997 with a budgeted cost of $250 million and an anticipated opening date of 2001. It would have been a retro-classic park with a facade reminiscent of historic Bonaventure Station. According to a Montreal Gazette editorial supporting the new park, Brochu's threat to move the team unless Olympic Stadium was replaced was "simple logic". Brochu sought $150 million in funding from the provincial government, but Premier Lucien Bouchard refused, saying he could not authorize public funding for a stadium when the province was being forced to close hospitals and had still not paid the Olympic Stadium debt. Many members of the consortium instead favoured selling the team. Hoping to pressure a sale, some members began to feed anonymous tips to the French press to make internal discord between Brochu and his partners public. Attendance continued to fall, decreasing by 39 percent in 1998 to an average of 11,295 spectators per game. It was the first of five consecutive seasons in which Montreal drew fewer than one million fans. One of the few bright spots of this time was the blossoming of Vladimir Guerrero into a star; he made four consecutive All-Star Games from 1999 to 2002, each time as the Expos' sole representative. Guerrero would eventually be elected to the National Baseball Hall of Fame in 2018.

By 1999, the partners publicly began to question Brochu's fitness to lead the organization and he was criticized by the media. Brochu was also accused of having a secret deal with MLB commissioner Bud Selig to move the Expos to Washington, D.C., charges he denied in a spring press conference held to answer the accusations of his partners. Brochu's rebuttals fell on deaf ears as fans sided with the consortium's smear campaign against Brochu. He was ultimately replaced as managing general partner by American art dealer Jeffrey Loria, who was initially hailed as the franchise's saviour. Loria had originally bid for the team in 1991, but Brochu and Ménard had balked at his demand for controlling interest.

=== Failed contraction and move (2001–2004) ===
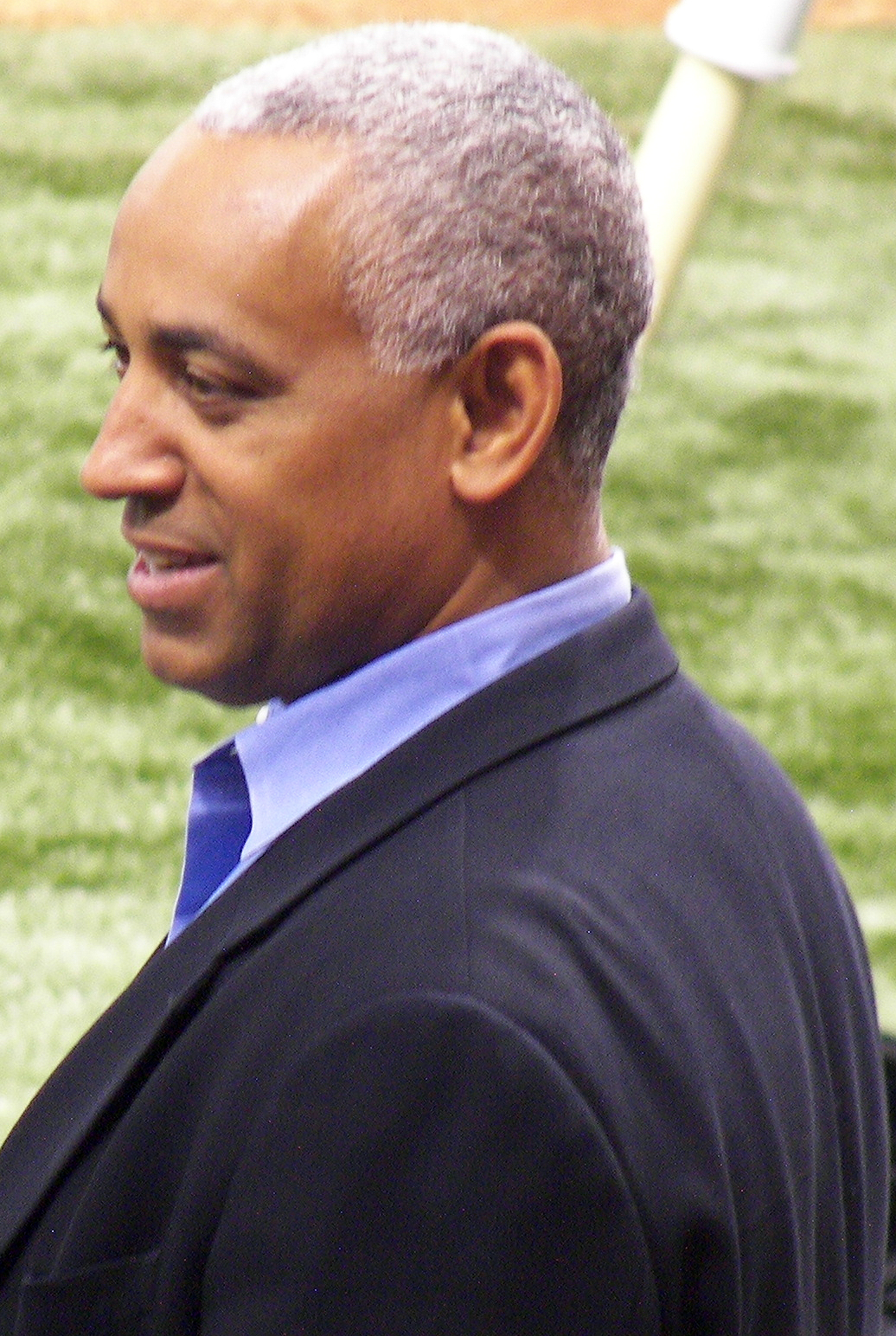
Omar Minaya was the first Latin American-born general manager in MLB history.

When Loria took control, he let it be known that Brochu's low-budget approach—or as he called it, "business as usual"—was over. He promised to rebuild the Expos with "a winning attitude and winning players" in an effort to bring the team back to where it had been only six years earlier. To that end, he drafted a new partnership agreement that gave him the right to call for cash investments in exchange for team equity—an option that had been unavailable to Brochu. Most of the minority partners, though, continued to treat their participation as a public-relations gesture and remained uninterested in investing additional money. When Loria issued a cash call in May 2000, the only other partners to increase their contributions were Coutu, Loblaw, and Stephen Bronfman. Rather than contribute more money, the minority partners proposed trading Guerrero. Loria instantly vetoed this suggestion.

As Loria increased his own financial contribution over the next two years, most of the other partners failed to do likewise, which resulted in Loria raising his share in the franchise to 92 percent. Speaking in retrospect, one of the minority partners, Mark Routtenberg, said that he was both "fooled" and "used" by Loria, and called him a carpetbagger.

The team payroll for 2000 increased to $33 million, nearly double the $17.9 million from the previous season. However, Loria's options for rebuilding the team were somewhat limited. Even with the team's renewed willingness to spend more on talent, most elite players were reluctant to play in Montreal, given the franchise's uncertain future and Olympic Stadium's poor playing conditions. As a result, most of the increased payroll came from the signings of free agent pitchers Graeme Lloyd and Hideki Irabu, as well as a three-way trade with the Rangers and Blue Jays that brought Rangers first baseman Lee Stevens to Montreal. These moves failed to translate into on-field success: Lloyd missed the entire season due to arthroscopic surgery, Irabu posted a 7.24 ERA, and Stevens only batted .265. The Expos lost 95 games. Interest in the team continued to decline, as both fans and businesses were unwilling to lend their support to a noncompetitive team.

Loria continued to pursue the construction of a new ballpark. He sought support from Major League Baseball, the Quebec government, and architectural firm HOK Sport for a cheaper and re-designed version of Labatt Park that eschewed the retro-classic concept in favour of a more modern design with curved contours and glass. HOK and MLB both thought Loria's proposed design was structurally unsound. More seriously, although Loria had been led to believe that Ménard had convinced the provincial government to contribute funding, in reality no agreement had been reached.

To bolster the team's finances, Loria tried to renegotiate the Expos' broadcasting deals, which were far less valuable than that of any other team. He broke off negotiations with The Sports Network, the largest English-language cable sports network in Canada, when it only offered the Expos $5,000 per game. Even allowing for the Expos' greatly reduced home territory compared to that of the Blue Jays (see below), TSN's offer was still a pittance compared to the $200,000 it paid the Blue Jays at the time. Loria had similar issues with prospective radio partners; the only interested parties would only air Expos games as part of a brokerage agreement in which the team paid for the airtime. The Alouettes and Canadiens had similar arrangements, which was considered highly unusual for the time.

Although the team continued its French radio coverage on the Telemedia network—whose flagship, CKAC, had carried the Expos since 1973—the Expos were unable to reach an agreement for English radio broadcasts. This resulted in the end of the Expos' longtime run on CIQC (formerly CFCF), which had been the Expos' English radio outlet for all but four years of their existence. No television coverage was available in either language. This left English-speaking fans relying on Internet audiocasts. Local fans accused Loria and his stepson, David Samson, of sabotage. In truth, though, according to longtime Montreal sportscaster Mitch Melnick, there was no anglophone radio for the 2000 season "because nobody wanted to pay for it." Years later, Samson said that he had initially hoped that if the Expos got off to a hot start, local broadcasters would initiate new negotiations, but further discussions never materialized. Dave Van Horne, the team's English-language play-by-play announcer since the team's inception, left at the season's end to work for the Florida Marlins.

In 2001, the Expos drew only 642,748 fans, one of the smallest totals in MLB in decades. The minority partners, whose interest was now reduced to a combined seven percent, became convinced that Loria had planned his moves to force them out. When pleas to Selig and MLB officials fell on deaf ears, the group became convinced that Selig and Loria had conspired to force the Expos out of Montreal. At the same time, MLB took steps to vote on contraction of the leagues, with the Expos and the Minnesota Twins slated for elimination. On November 6, 2001, MLB's owners voted 28–2 in favour of contraction, with only the Expos and Twins opposed. Initial plans called for the Expos and Twins to play a lame-duck season in 2002 before their franchises were revoked. Both teams were saved after a legal challenge filed in Minnesota that forced MLB to honour the Twins' lease with the Metrodome, as well as challenges by the MLBPA. As MLB was unable to find another candidate team to eliminate, the immediate threat for the Expos diminished, as MLB needed to keep an even number of teams to maintain its schedule.

Shortly afterward, Loria sold the Expos to MLB and used the money he received from the sale to purchase the Florida Marlins from John Henry, who had recently purchased the Boston Red Sox. As a result of the transaction, Loria turned a significant profit on his initial $16 million investment—MLB bought the Expos from him for $120 million and gave him a $38.5 million interest free loan to complete the purchase of the Marlins. After the sale, Loria took virtually everything of value with him to Miami, including the Expos' computers and scouting reports. His departure also marked the final end of the proposed Labatt Park, though any realistic chance of the park being built ended when the Bouchard government repeated its previous refusal to commit any public money to the project.

MLB formed Expos Baseball L.P., a partnership of the other 29 clubs, to operate the team. It appointed former Anaheim Angels president Tony Tavares as team president to oversee business operations and oversee a future move of the team, and Mets assistant general manager Omar Minaya as vice-president, general manager and operating head of the franchise. MLB's chief disciplinarian Frank Robinson was appointed as the team's manager.

Minaya, the first Latino general manager in baseball history, inherited a difficult situation. He was hired only 72 hours before the start of spring training, and there were only six other employees in baseball operations; most of the others had either followed Loria to the Marlins or taken jobs with other clubs. As the Expos began what many assumed at the time to be their final season in 2002, the mood in the Olympic Stadium for the home opener—a victory over the Marlins—was ugly. Montreal's home opener drew 34,000 fans, many of which came not only to say "goodbye" to the franchise, but also to express their disgust and anger at Loria.

Loria's minority partners, who had gone from collectively owning 76 percent of the Expos to less than seven percent of the Marlins, filed a Racketeer Influenced and Corrupt Organizations Act (RICO) lawsuit against Major League Baseball, Selig and Loria. The partners contended that Loria and the commissioner's office had conspired to deprive them of their shares by issuing cash calls, and thus deliberately undermined the franchise's future in Montreal. The partners were ultimately unsuccessful in their suit, as it was dismissed in 2005 after an arbitration panel rejected their claims.

On the field, the 2002 Expos exceeded expectations and were in playoff contention for much of the season. As they were owned by the other teams, including their direct competitors, the Expos did not have any flexibility to increase their payroll for a last-ditch postseason drive. Operating under the belief that the Expos were playing their last season in Montreal, Minaya completed a blockbuster trade with the Cleveland Indians in late June to make a final run at bringing postseason success to the city, acquiring Bartolo Colón, one of baseball's top pitchers, in exchange for several star prospects and without increasing payroll. Remembering how the Seattle Mariners had revived a stalled bid for what became Safeco Field with a playoff run in 1995, Minaya believed that if the Expos made the playoffs, the renewed public and private sector support would lead to a viable owner stepping forward who would keep the team in Montreal. Minaya made several smaller moves, but the team lost its early-season momentum; they went seven games under .500 in July and August. The Expos finished with an 83–79 record—their first winning season since 1996—but finished second in the NL East, 19 games out of both the division lead and the wild card.

The Expos franchise was saved by a new collective bargaining agreement between the owners and players that forbade contraction until at least 2006. Speculation of contraction was replaced by rumours of a move, as it was obvious MLB did not intend to keep the team in Montreal. While MLB was not ready to move the Expos right away, in 2003 it sought to increase revenues by having the team play 22 of its 81 home games in San Juan, Puerto Rico. The Expos again found themselves in contention for the playoffs: on August 29, the team was tied with four other clubs for the National League Wild Card spot. When MLB's rosters expanded on September 1, Selig announced that the Expos would not be recalling any additional players from the minor leagues: the other owners had decided against spending a few extra thousand dollars, a small fraction of the team's $35 million payroll, to bolster the team. Several players, including relief pitcher Eric Knott, were sent back to the minors due to budget constraints. The team faded again, finishing 18 games out of first in the East and eight games out of the wild card spot. Later, Minaya said that the denial of the September call-ups was "a message to the players" and "a momentum killer". Keri later wrote that MLB's refusal to authorize the September call-ups eroded what goodwill the Expos still had among the Montreal fanbase. After the season, Guerrero was lost to free agency, while staff ace Javier Vázquez was traded to the Yankees.

The final season of the Montreal Expos came in 2004, and was again split between Montreal and San Juan. The team never recovered from an April win–loss record of 5–19, and finished the season with a 67–95 record, the second-worst record in the National League. On September 29, 2004, Major League Baseball announced that the franchise would move to Washington, D.C., for the 2005 season. That same night, the team played its final game in Montreal: a 9–1 loss to the Florida Marlins before 31,395 fans. The team then played its final games as the Expos on the road, ending on October 3 against the New York Mets, the team they had faced in the franchise's inaugural game in 1969. In the Expos' last-ever game, the New York Mets defeated Montreal 8–1 at Shea Stadium. Jamey Carroll scored the last Expos run and Endy Chávez became the final Expos batter in history when he grounded out in the top of the ninth to end the game. The team ended their 36-year run with an all-time record of 2,753 wins, 2,943 losses and four ties.

The last active former Montreal Expos player in the major leagues was Bartolo Colón, who played his last MLB game with the Texas Rangers in 2018.

The Nationals won the 2019 World Series, the franchise's first title in its 51 seasons, under manager Dave Martinez, who had played with the Expos from 1988 to 1991.

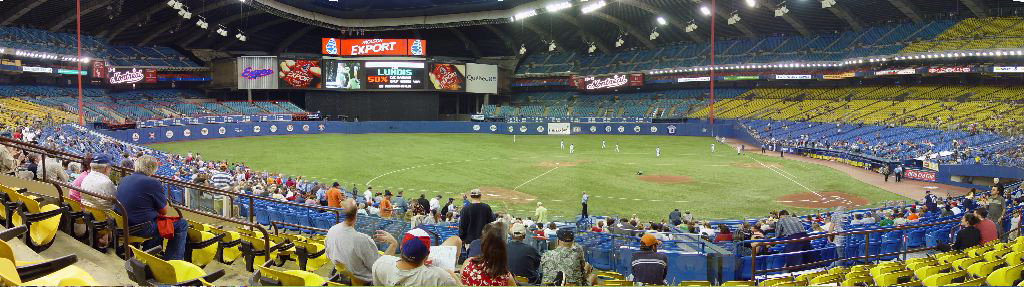
Panoramic view before an Expos game at Olympic Stadium in 2004.
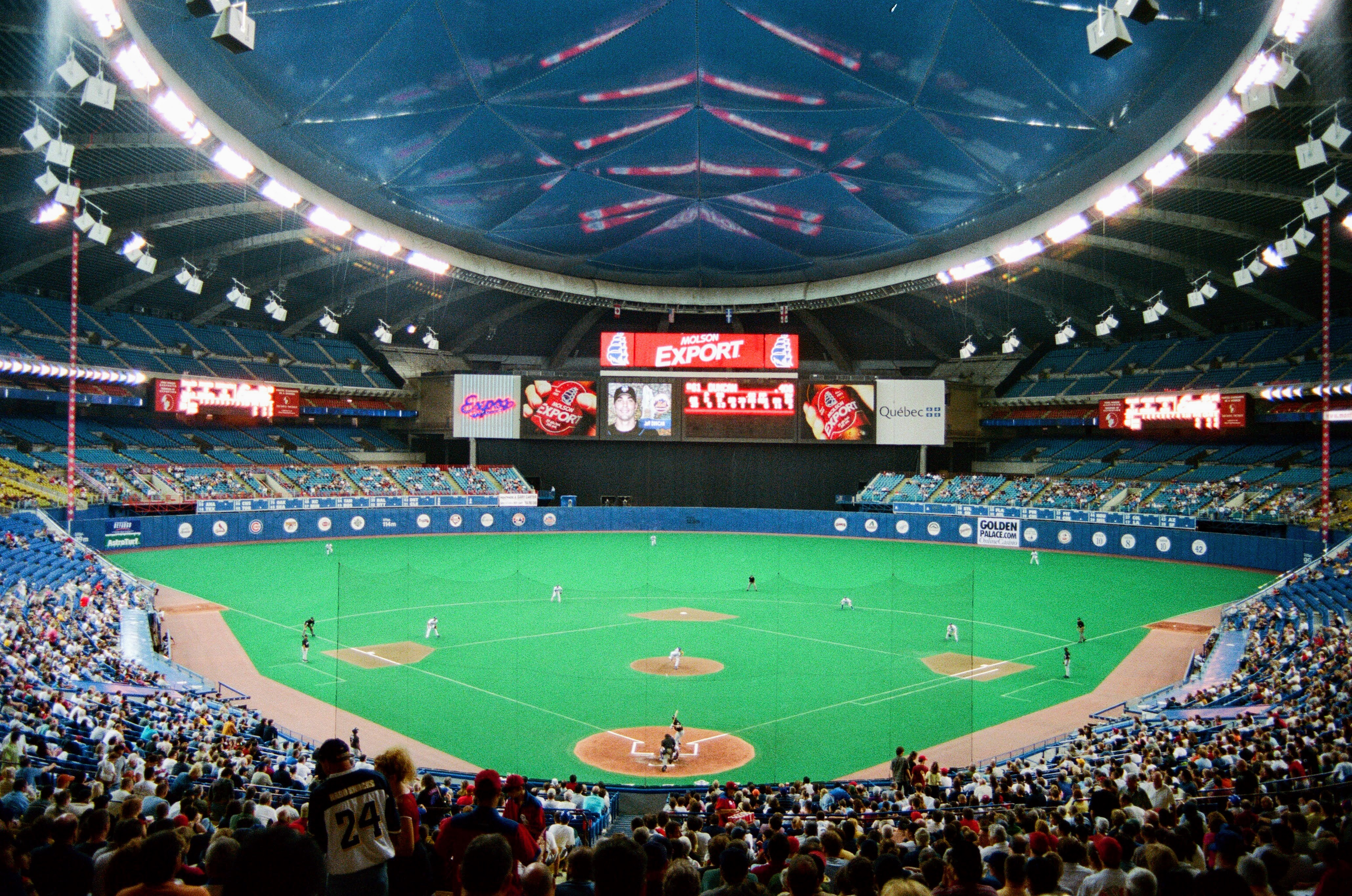
Montreal Expos Playing New York Mets in 2003.

=== Possible revival ===
In December 2025, Montreal-based entrepreneur Ashkan Karbasfrooshan announced an exploratory process to bring back MLB baseball and the Montreal Expos via the next expansion window.

== Team identity ==
The Expos logo consists of the stylized letters "eb", representing "Expos" and "baseball", combined to form a large "M", representing "Montreal".

In 1972, the Telemedia radio network brought in Jacques Doucet and Claude Raymond to serve as the Expos' French language broadcast team. Carling O'Keefe brewery, the title sponsor for the French-language broadcasts, convened a meeting of writers and broadcasters across Quebec to establish a French language glossary of baseball terminology. From 1908, there had been a gradual introduction of French baseball terms in the French-language media. The use of French terms gained greater predominance with the resurrection of the Montreal Royals franchise in 1928. However English terms were still in use. Through the efforts of Doucet and Raymond, a more complete French language baseball lexicon was created, including terms such as "balle-papillon" (knuckleball, literally "butterfly ball"), "formation" (lineup), "ricochet" (foul tip), "coup sûr" (hit, literally "sure hit"), and "coup de circuit" (home run, literally "circuit hit", as in a hit resulting in one lap of the bases).

=== Uniforms ===
The Expos' original uniforms featured the team logo above the word "expos" in lowercase letters on the left chest, and blue rounded serif numbers on the right chest. White served as the home uniform base, while powder blue served as the road uniform base. Both designs were worn with a tricolour cap that had a white crown, blue brim and back panel, and red side panels, with the Expos logo in front. The original design endured a few slight changes over the years, such as a change to red letters on the road uniform, and the addition of shoulder and side stripes.

In 1992, the Expos overhauled their design. On the home uniform, blue pinstripes were added and a script "Expos" in blue with red trim was emblazoned in front. On the road uniform, grey became the base colour, and featured "Montreal" in red script letters with blue and white trim. A blue fleur-de-lis was also added above the road uniform script in the place where the acute accent would appear in the French spelling "Montréal". Both designs featured the team logo on the left sleeve and left chest numbers below the script, and were worn with an all-blue cap featuring the Expos logo in front.

On July 6, 2019, the Washington Nationals honoured their predecessors by donning the 1969 Expos powder blue uniform against the Kansas City Royals, as part of the franchise's 50th anniversary. However, the Nationals' tribute to the Expos drew mixed reactions from fans and critics.

=== Youppi! ===
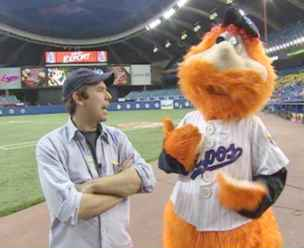
Youppi! at an Expos home game

The Expos introduced their first mascot, Souki, during the 1978 season. He resembled Mr. Met with a futuristic looking uniform but was met with such a negative reaction that the team immediately retired him after one season. Souki was once attacked by a father of children frightened by him. Seeking a replacement, the Expos found a design for a mascot similar to the Phillie Phanatic in the inventory of an American mascot company that had gone bankrupt. The mascot was designed by Bonnie Erickson, who created the Phanatic as well as several Muppets characters, including Miss Piggy. The team named the new mascot "Youppi!", which is French for "Yippee!" Unlike Souki, Youppi! was immediately popular with fans upon his introduction in 1979, particularly children, and he became a fixture at children's hospitals during his 25 years as the Expos mascot.

Youppi! made history in 1989 when he became the first mascot in Major League history to be ejected from a game. The incident occurred during the 11th inning of a game against the Los Angeles Dodgers when Youppi! was dancing and parading on top of the Dodgers' dugout. Dodgers manager Tommy Lasorda complained to the umpires, who ejected Youppi! from the game. Youppi! was eventually allowed to return with the condition that he remain away from the Dodgers' dugout. The game was also the longest in Expos history as the Dodgers won 1–0 in 22 innings.

The Expos' move to Washington left Youppi! in limbo. Several organizations expressed interest in taking over the character, including other Montreal sports teams. After a year in storage, the mascot was sold to the National Hockey League's Montreal Canadiens. The Canadiens claim Youppi! is the first mascot in professional sports to change leagues; he made his re-debut with the Canadiens on October 18, 2005.

== Relationship with the Toronto Blue Jays ==
The Toronto Blue Jays joined the American League as an expansion franchise in 1977, and one year later met the Expos for the first time in an exhibition contest, the first of an annual series that became known as the Pearson Cup. The Expos won that first game, 5–4, in front of 20,221 fans on June 29. Eight annual exhibitions were played between 1978 and 1986, with the 1981 game skipped due to the strike. Each team won three games, with two contests ending as ties. The teams did not meet again until the advent of interleague play in 1997. The games boosted attendance in both Montreal and Toronto.

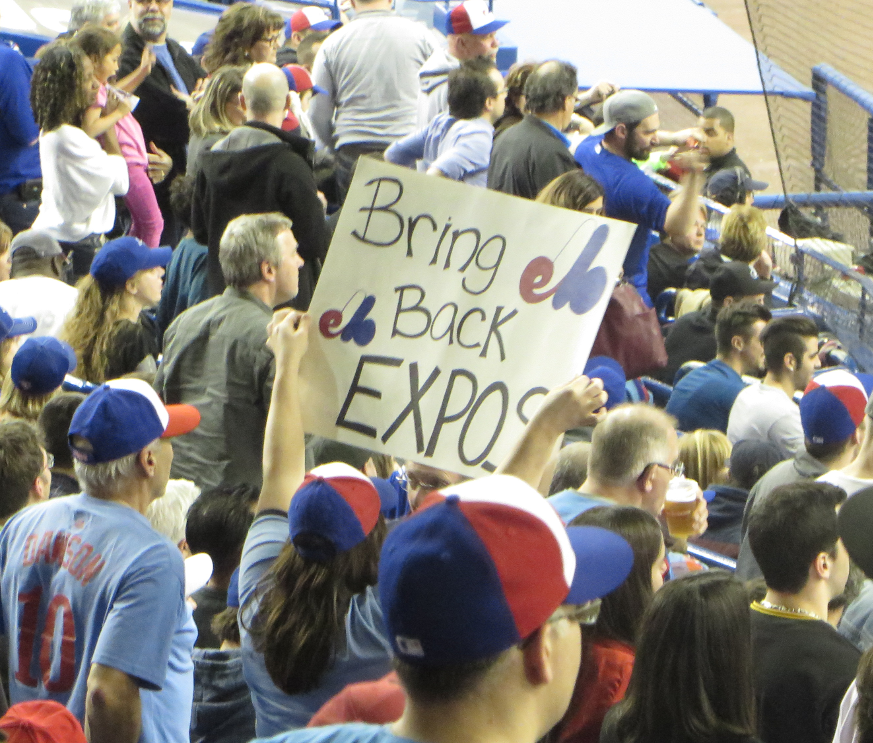
A fan calls for a return of the Expos during the Blue Jays-Reds exhibition series at Olympic Stadium in 2015.

John McHale, then president of the Expos, was a strong proponent of adding a second Canadian Major League team, in Toronto. The Expos remained Canada's most popular team until their mid-1980s downturn coincided with the Blue Jays' rise, culminating in the Jays' first American League East division championship, in 1985. At the same time, the Blue Jays grew perturbed that the Expos were able to air most of their games in several markets in southern Ontario—such as Windsor, Belleville, and Toronto itself. The Jays lobbied MLB to designate southern Ontario as their exclusive home television territory. Bronfman opposed the request, as he feared that shutting the Expos out of Canada's largest and most lucrative television market would limit the team's fan base. MLB sided with the Blue Jays as a part of the territorial changes, allowing the Expos to air only 15 games in the Jays' television market for free and having to purchase the rights to air additional games. For the remainder of their existence, the Expos only had full broadcast rights in Quebec and Atlantic Canada. The loss of viewership in southern Ontario diminished the Expos' ability to attract sponsors and corporate partners. Longtime Expos play-by-play broadcaster Dave Van Horne later argued that the loss of badly needed corporate support "really started a long, downward spiral" for the team. Indeed, Keri later wrote that the Expos miscalculated when they considered the Blue Jays an ally rather than a potential threat, and missed a chance to cement their right to air their games across Canada. Keri added that the loss of this revenue stream, along with "many other poor business decisions" over the years, made it difficult for the Expos to be viable in Montreal.

Regardless of their disagreements over television rights, when the Blue Jays reached the 1992 World Series, the team honoured Bronfman's contributions in bringing Major League Baseball to the country by having him throw the ceremonial first pitch for the first World Series game played in Canada. However, and while Blue Jays president Paul Godfrey again acknowledged the Expos' role in his own team's existence, Godfrey nonetheless voted with the other teams to support contracting the Expos in 2001 and moving them in 2004: "I know if it wasn't for the success of the Expos in those early years there would not be major-league baseball in Toronto. That wasn't an emotional or a baseball vote. It was a business decision." The Blue Jays' failure to stand with their fellow Canadian team offended many Expos fans.

Ten years after the Expos moved to Washington, a two-game exhibition series between the Toronto Blue Jays and New York Mets was held at the Olympic Stadium to conclude the spring training schedule before the 2014 season. For the Blue Jays, the series was intended, in part, to increase the team's following in Quebec. For others, the goal was to demonstrate that Montreal had an interest in returning to Major League Baseball. Former Expos player Warren Cromartie, who leads the Montreal Baseball Project, was among the organizers. The series was a success: A combined 96,350 fans, frequently chanting "Let's go Expos!" and "We want baseball!", attended the two games. The Blue Jays returned for a two-game series in 2015, against the Cincinnati Reds, which was attended by a combined total of 96,545 fans. The success of the series' bolstered the Montreal Baseball Project's efforts: retiring commissioner Bud Selig was impressed by the fans in 2014 and said the city would be an "excellent candidate" for a new team. His replacement, Rob Manfred, echoed those comments in 2015. Olympic Stadium again hosted two spring training games before the 2016 season between the Toronto Blue Jays and the Boston Red Sox, with a combined attendance of over 106,000 fans. Since 2014, the Blue Jays have made it an annual tradition to host two spring training games in Montreal before the start of each season. In 2018, Vladimir Guerrero Jr. of the Blue Jays - whose father, Vladimir Guerrero, starred for the Expos in the 1990s - hit a game-winning home run against the St. Louis Cardinals in an exhibition game, to the delight of the Montreal crowd.

== Players ==
=== Retired numbers ===
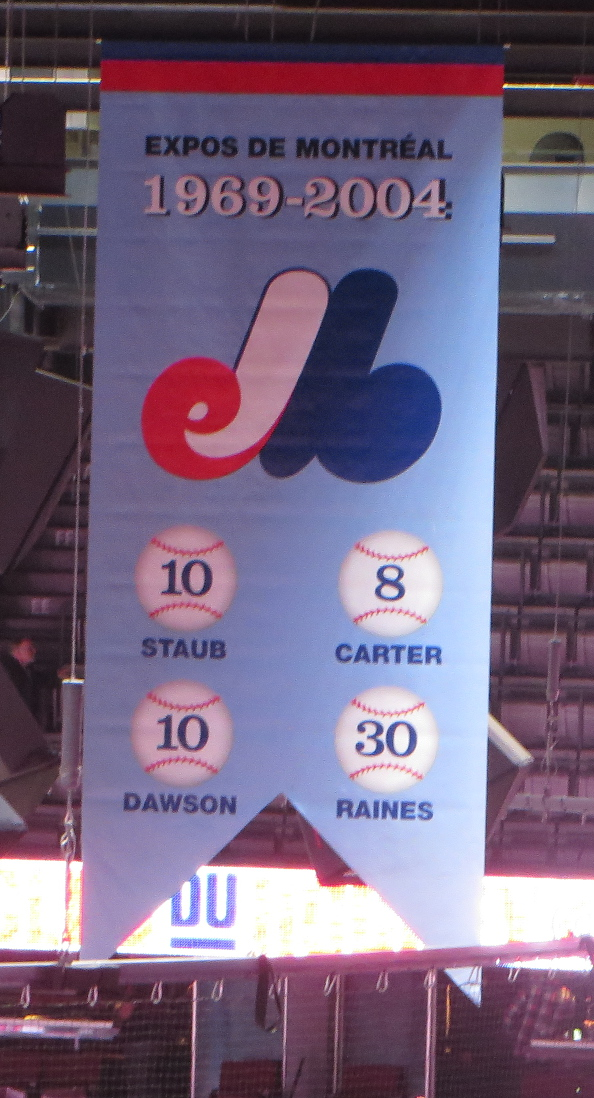
Expos banner hanging at the Bell Centre

**Gary**; **Carter**; C 1974–84 & 1992	**Andre**; **Dawson**; RF/CF; 1976–86	**Rusty**; **Staub**; RF; 1969–71 & 1979	**Tim**; **Raines**; LF; 1979–90 & 2001	**Jackie**; **Robinson**; 2B; Retired 1997

=== Baseball Hall of Famers ===
Montreal Expos Hall of Famers
Affiliation according to the National Baseball Hall of Fame and Museum
Montreal Expos

**Gary Carter** *
Andre Dawson *

Vladimir Guerrero *
Randy Johnson

Pedro Martínez
Tony Pérez

**Tim Raines** *
Lee Smith

Larry Walker
Dick Williams *

- Players and managers listed in **bold** are depicted on their Hall of Fame plaques wearing a Expos cap insignia.
- * Montreal Expos listed as primary team according to the Hall of Fame

Ten people who represented the Expos organization have subsequently gone on to gain election to the National Baseball Hall of Fame and Museum. Gary Carter was inducted in 2003 and was the first player whose Hall of Fame plaque depicted him with an Expos cap. The Hall's choice for his plaque logo followed initial statements by Carter that he preferred to be enshrined as a New York Met, with whom he won the 1986 World Series. He accepted the Hall's decision with grace, stating: "The fact I played 11 years in Montreal and the fact that the majority of my statistics and accomplishments were achieved there, it would be wrong, probably, to do it any other way."

Andre Dawson became the second depicted as an Expos player when he was elected in 2010. Although he had played the majority of his 21-year career with Montreal, Dawson also preferred his plaque to display a different logo: when the decision was made, he publicly expressed his disappointment, saying it was "a little gut-wrenching" to find out he would not go in as a Chicago Cub while also stating, “I respect the Hall of Fame’s decision to put an Expos logo on my cap, and I understand their responsibility to make sure the logo represents the greatest impact in my career." Dawson's reluctance to be enshrined as an Expos player stemmed, in part, from the breakdown of his relationship with the team during MLB's collusion scandal of 1986–87, when he claims the team not only "threw him out" of Montreal, but tried to prevent other teams from signing him as a free agent. In 2026, the Hall of Fame announced that Dawson's plaque would be recast with a blank cap, per his wishes.

The third player with an Expos logo on his Hall of Fame plaque is Tim Raines, who was inducted in 2017, his final year of eligibility.

On January 24, 2018, the National Baseball Hall of Fame and Museum announced Vladimir Guerrero as an inductee into the Hall of Fame. Guerrero played eight of his 16 seasons with the Expos, being named to the MLB All-Star Game three times and winning the Silver Slugger Award three times while with the team. Nearly half of his career 2,590 hits were with Montreal (1,215), while having 234 of his 449 home runs and 702 of his 1,496 RBIs with the Expos in 1,004 games. Guerrero announced his Hall of Fame plaque will display him wearing an Angels cap.

For the five other inductees, their time in Montreal played lesser roles in their careers. Manager Dick Williams was a member of the Expos between 1977 and 1981 as part of a 21-year managerial career in which he took three different teams to the World Series. Tony Pérez played three years with the Expos but was primarily known for being a member of Cincinnati's "Big Red Machine" teams of the 1970s. Pitchers Pedro Martínez (1994–97) and Randy Johnson (1988–89), who both played in Montreal early in their careers but spent the majority of their playing days elsewhere, were both elected to the Hall in 2015. Frank Robinson managed the team from 2002 to 2006 (spanning the franchise's move to Washington), but was elected based on his accomplishments as a player, including being the first player to win Most Valuable Player honours in both the AL and NL, a triple crown in 1966, and a rookie-record of 38 home runs while winning the NL Rookie of the Year award.

When the Washington Nationals unveiled their "Ring of Honor" at Nationals Park in 2010, the franchise recognized its roots in Montreal. The ring was created to honour Hall-of-Fame players associated with Washington, D.C., baseball or the Montreal-Washington franchise, later expanded to include anyone who has made a significant contribution to the game of baseball in Washington, D.C. Two Expos players – Gary Carter and Andre Dawson – were named among the inaugural members. Frank Robinson was added to the Ring of Honor in 2015, as was Tim Raines in 2017.

=== Ford C. Frick Award recipients ===
Montreal Expos Ford C. Frick Award recipients
Affiliation according to the National Baseball Hall of Fame and Museum

**Dave Van Horne**

- **Names in bold** received the award based primarily on their work as broadcasters for the Expos.

Longtime broadcaster Dave Van Horne was named the recipient of the Ford C. Frick Award in 2011. The award is presented by the National Baseball Hall of Fame to honour broadcasters who make "major contributions to baseball".

=== Canadian Baseball Hall of Fame ===
Expos in the Canadian Baseball Hall of Fame
No.	Inductee	Position	Tenure	Notes
48	Felipe Alou	OF/1B; Manager	1973, 1992–2001	
—	Charles Bronfman	Owner	1969–1990	Born in Montreal, attended McGill University
8	Gary Carter	C	1974–1984, 1992	
—	Murray Cook	Executive	1984–1987	Born in Sackville, New Brunswick
13, 37	Rhéal Cormier	P	1996–1997	Born in Moncton, New Brunswick
10	Andre Dawson	RF/CF	1976–1986	
—	Jacques Doucet	Broadcaster	1972–2004	Born in Montreal
29	Rob Ducey	OF	2001	Born in Toronto
6, 7	Jim Fanning	GM; Manager	1969–1976; 1981–1982, 1984	
27	Vladimir Guerrero	RF	1996–2003	
32	Dennis Martínez	P	1986–1993	
37, 45	Pedro Martínez	P	1994–1997	Elected mainly on his performance with Boston Red Sox
—	John McHale	President; GM	1969–1986; 1978–1984	
30	Tim Raines	LF	1979–1990, 2001	
16	Claude Raymond	P	1969–1971	Born in Saint-Jean-sur-Richelieu, Quebec
45	Steve Rogers	P	1973–1985	
3, 25, 59	Matt Stairs	OF/1B	1992–1993	Born in St. John, New Brunswick, grew up in Fredericton, New Brunswick
10	Rusty Staub	RF	1969–1971, 1979	
—	Dave Van Horne	Broadcaster	1969–2000	
33	Larry Walker	OF	1989–1994	Elected mainly on his performance with Colorado Rockies, born in Maple Ridge, British Columbia
29, 58	Tim Wallach	3B	1980–1992	

=== Montreal Expos Hall of Fame ===
The team created the Montreal Expos Hall of Fame to celebrate the franchise's 25th season in 1993. Charles Bronfman was inducted as its inaugural member. In a pre-game ceremony on August 14, 1993, a circular patch on the right field wall was unveiled with Bronfman's name, the number 83 (which he used to wear during spring training), and the words "FONDATEUR / FOUNDER". A total of 23 people were honoured by the club.

Key
**Bold**	Member of the Baseball Hall of Fame
†	Member of the Baseball Hall of Fame as an Expo
**Bold**	Recipient of the Hall of Fame's Ford C. Frick Award

Montreal Expos Hall of Fame
No.	Inductee	Position	Tenure	Inducted
—	Charles Bronfman	Owner	1969–1990	1993
8	**Gary Carter**^{†}	C	1974–1984, 1992	1993
10	Rusty Staub	RF	1969–1971, 1979	1993
4	Gene Mauch	Manager	1969–1975	1994
16	Claude Raymond	P	1969–1971	1994
45	Steve Rogers	P	1973–1985	1994
35	Woodie Fryman	P	1975–1976, 1978–1983	1995
—	Jean-Pierre Roy	Broadcaster	1969–1984	1995
26	Bill Stoneman	P	1969–1973	1995
49	Warren Cromartie	OF/1B	1974–1983	1996
33	Ron Hunt	2B	1971–1974	1996
15, 50	Larry Parrish	3B/RF	1974–1981	1996
10	**Andre Dawson**^{†}	RF/CF	1976–1986	1997
34	Bill Gullickson	P	1979–1985	1997
31, 41	Jeff Reardon	P	1981–1986	1997
—	John McHale	President; GM	1969–1986; 1978–1984	1997
44, 54	Tim Burke	P	1985–1991	1998
4	Chris Speier	SS	1977–1984	1998
29, 58	Tim Wallach	3B	1980–1992	1998
6, 7	Jim Fanning	GM; Manager	1969–1976; 1981–1982, 1984	2000
30	**Tim Raines**^{†}	LF	1979–1990, 2001	2000
—	**Dave Van Horne**	Broadcaster	1969–2000	2001
—	Jacques Doucet	Broadcaster	1972–2004	2003

== Expos records ==
The players listed here represent the statistical leaders for the franchise's time in Montreal only. For the record holders of the franchise overall, see List of Washington Nationals team records.

Batting
Statistic	Player	Total	Ref.
Games played	Tim Wallach	1,767	
Hits	Tim Wallach	1,694	
Home runs	Vladimir Guerrero	234	
Runs batted in	Tim Wallach	905	
Stolen bases	Tim Raines	635	
Batting average	Vladimir Guerrero	.323	

Pitching
Statistic	Player	Total	Ref.
Games	Tim Burke	525	
Wins	Steve Rogers	158	
Saves	Jeff Reardon	152	
Strikeouts	Steve Rogers	1,621	
Complete games	Steve Rogers	129	
Earned Run Average min. 500 innings	Tim Burke	2.61	

== No-hitters and cycles ==
Three pitchers in Expos history threw no-hitters. Bill Stoneman threw the first during the team's inaugural 1969 season. He threw a second no-hitter in 1972. Charlie Lea threw the third, nine years later in 1981. A decade after that, on July 28, 1991, Dennis Martínez threw the 13th official perfect game in Major League Baseball history. Two other pitchers threw no-hitters in shortened games which, after a 1992 rule change, were no longer recognized by MLB as official no-hitters. David Palmer pitched a perfect five innings in a rain-shortened game against the St. Louis Cardinals on April 22, 1984. Pascual Pérez threw a five-inning no-hitter on September 24, 1988, against the Philadelphia Phillies.

Six batters hit for the cycle in Montreal's history. Tim Foli was the first to do it in 1976, and Vladimir Guerrero was the last to do so, in 2003.

No-hitters
Player	Date	Opponent	Ref.
Bill Stoneman	April 17, 1969	Philadelphia Phillies	
Bill Stoneman	October 2, 1972	New York Mets	
Charlie Lea	May 10, 1981	San Francisco Giants	
Dennis Martínez (Perfect game)	July 28, 1991	Los Angeles Dodgers	

Cycles
Player	Date	Opponent	Ref.
Tim Foli	April 21–22, 1976	Chicago Cubs	
Chris Speier	July 20, 1978	Atlanta Braves	
Tim Raines	August 16, 1987	Pittsburgh Pirates	
Rondell White	June 11, 1995	San Francisco Giants	
Brad Wilkerson	June 24, 2003	Pittsburgh Pirates	
Vladimir Guerrero	September 14, 2003	New York Mets	

== See also ==
- List of Montreal Expos broadcasters

National League Eastern Division Champions
Preceded by: Philadelphia Phillies	1981	Succeeded by: St. Louis Cardinals
