= Jeffrey Loria =

American art dealer and sports team owner

- Born: Jeffrey Harold Loria; November 20, 1940 (age 85); Manhattan, New York City, New York, U.S.
- Education: Yale University; Columbia Business School
- Occupations: Art dealer, author, professional sports franchise owner
- Spouses: Sivia Samson (m. 1980; div. 2005); Julie Lavin Loria (m. 2007)
- Children: David Samson (baseball), stepson
- Parent(s): Ruth Ost Loria; Walter J. Loria

Jeffrey Harold Loria (born November 20, 1940) is an American art dealer, author, and the former owner of several sports teams, including the Montreal Expos and Miami Marlins of Major League Baseball.

== Early life ==
Loria was born and raised in a Jewish family in Manhattan, the son of Ruth (Ost) and Walter J. Loria, a lawyer. Loria took an early interest in baseball, attending his first New York Yankees game in the late 1940s. Loria attended New York City's Stuyvesant High School and Yale University, where he initially took pre-med courses. With a requirement to take a history class, Loria chose art history.

After college, he worked in a newly established art-buying program for Sears, launched with the help of actor Vincent Price. In 1965, at the age of 24, he opened his business, Jeffrey H. Loria & Co., on Manhattan's Upper East Side and wrote a book, Collecting Original Art. He specializes in 20th-century masters, and his collection includes works by Pablo Picasso and Henry Moore. Loria graduated from Columbia Business School in 1968 and published his second book, What's It All About Charlie Brown?. Co-written with Pat K. Lynch, it is a look at life through the Peanuts comic strip.

== Montreal Expos ==
In 1989, Loria purchased the Oklahoma City 89ers, then a Triple-A affiliate of the Texas Rangers. The team won the American Association championship in 1992. Loria sold the team in 1993 and began looking to buy a Major League team. He lost out to Peter Angelos in his bid to purchase the Baltimore Orioles in 1994.

On December 9, 1999, he bought a 24 percent stake in the Montreal Expos for $18 million CAD (approximately $12 million USD) and became the managing general partner. He'd initially considered buying the team in 1991 from founding owner Charles Bronfman, but Bronfman balked at Loria's demand for a controlling interest and the team was subsequently sold to then-team president Claude Brochu instead. Loria headed an ownership group that included the city of Montreal, several Montreal businesses, and Stephen Bronfman, Charles' son. When a series of cash calls over the next two years went unanswered, Loria ended up with 93 percent of the team at a valuation of US$50 million.

One of Loria's first acts was to reiterate demands for a new park for the Expos to replace Olympic Stadium, of which he bluntly said, "We cannot stay here." He lost a considerable amount of goodwill with Expos fans when the team was not able to reach an agreement for television and English-speaking radio coverage during the 2000 season, as the Expos tried to increase their revenue from broadcast rights. He also sought more public funding for a planned downtown ballpark, Labatt Park. However, the provincial and municipal governments balked at committing more money to the project. Premier Lucien Bouchard said that he could not support using public funds to build ballparks when the province was being forced to shut down hospitals. Additionally, Bouchard did not like that Olympic Stadium still had not been paid for 25 years after being built, and ultimately wouldn't be paid for until 2006.

=== Sale of the Expos ===
In 2002, as part of an orchestrated move with Bud Selig and then-Marlins owner John W. Henry, Loria sold the Expos to a partnership of the other 29 major league clubs for $120 million. In effect, the Expos were sold to the commissioner's office (being owned by the league). Henry then sold the Marlins to Loria for $158.5 million, including a $38.5 million no-interest loan from MLB. The deal was approved by the other owners before Loria and Henry signed the contract, and paved the way for Henry to buy the Boston Red Sox. Loria moved the Expos' entire front office staff, on-field staff, office equipment and computer equipment to Florida. MLB's plans to contract the Expos and Minnesota Twins failed, as the Twins were compelled to fulfill the terms of their lease at the Hubert H. Humphrey Metrodome.

Loria's partners in the Expos ownership consortium filed a Racketeer Influenced and Corrupt Organizations Act (RICO) lawsuit against Loria and Major League Baseball, eventually going to arbitration, with the arbitration panel finding in favor of Loria. The Expos were ultimately transferred to Washington, D.C., as the Nationals. While the move was welcomed by baseball fans in Washington, it has led to many bitter feelings among Montreal – as well as Canadian – baseball fans. Many speculate that Loria never intended to keep the team in Montreal. The feelings among some Canadian baseball fans are so strong that, in 2011, when Loria chose Remembrance Day to announce his team's new name and stadium, Richard Griffin, a well-known Canadian baseball columnist wrote:

It's ironic that Loria and the Marlins held their celebration in Miami on Remembrance Day because there's a generation of fans north of the border that will never forget (about how Loria's actions led to the Expos leaving town).

== Miami Marlins ==
Shortly after selling the Expos, Loria officially became owner of the Marlins on February 12, 2002. Loria won his first World Series as an owner in his second full season in Florida, as the Marlins beat the Yankees four games to two in the 2003 World Series.

In 2013, Forbes evaluated the current value for the Miami Marlins at around $520 million. As of May 12, 2009, the Marlins were 569–564 under Loria. On November 11, 2011, the Florida Marlins officially rebranded themselves the Miami Marlins with a new logo, uniform, and color scheme.

The franchise, which previously paid rent at Sun Life Stadium, had been trying for years to finance a new retractable roof ballpark. The City of Miami and Miami-Dade County both voted to approve construction of a new baseball stadium for the Marlins. Marlins Park is located in the area formerly occupied by the Miami Orange Bowl football stadium. Construction was completed by opening day 2012. Before the stadium deal was in place, the team shed star players to pare down payroll to among baseball's lowest in 2006, and was given permission to explore options for relocating. The team then worked with the City of Miami and Miami-Dade County, in a public/private partnership, to build the 37,000 seat ballpark.

A deal with the City of Miami and Miami-Dade County was eventually approved and the Marlins agreed to contribute $155 million toward the construction of a new retractable roof stadium. They were also made responsible for any cost overruns for the stadium, set in the Little Havana section of Miami. Financing for the facility was completed with tourist bed taxes and funds reserved specifically for convention centers and sporting facilities. The deal required taxpayer general funds to compensate all cost overruns, but the facility was completed on-time and under budget. The Marlins receive 100% of all revenues from the stadium, but must pay all costs associated with operating the facility. The first Major League Baseball game in the new stadium was against the St. Louis Cardinals on April 4, 2012.

Following a disappointing season in which the Marlins finished last in their division, the Marlins completed a 12-player trade on November 19, 2012, with the Toronto Blue Jays as part of an effort to pare down the team's payroll. This led local and national sportswriters, as well as Marlins fans, to criticize Loria's stated intentions of building a competitive team. Much of the controversy stemmed from the demands on local government to fund much of the construction at Marlins Park. Although the Marlins faced the threat of boycotts during the 2013 season from local residents, politicians, and sportswriters, Loria defended the November 2012 trade with the Blue Jays. He claimed that despite the Marlins' hefty payroll in 2012, the fans did not sell out the facility as imagined and that the organization was not winning and needed to "take a new course" in order to do so.

In April 2013, Loria reportedly had Ricky Nolasco and José Fernández switch the games of a doubleheader in which they were scheduled to pitch, violating clubhouse protocol. In July 2013, hitting coach Tino Martinez, who had been handpicked by Loria, resigned following allegations that he verbally and physically assaulted players, including Chris Valaika. When the organization considered promoting Valaika to the majors in August after Plácido Polanco was placed on the disabled list, Loria vetoed the transaction, and the team promoted Gil Velazquez instead.

Loria had been called "baseball's most hated man", its "worst owner", and even one of the "worst owner(s) in sports history". He is a "widely despised" figure in South Florida; in 2012, a Miami Herald poll found him with a six percent favorability rating among Marlins fans and Major League Baseball fans in South Florida.

Loria sold the team in 2017 to a group led by Bruce Sherman.

=== Political controversy ===
In February 2017, it was reported that Loria had been in negotiations to sell the Marlins to the family of Jared Kushner, son-in-law of Donald Trump, and that the parties came to "a handshake deal". At the same time, the first Trump administration was working to name Loria the United States ambassador to France. In response, Kushner announced that his family would not buy the club if Loria was appointed to the position. Neither the appointment nor the deal ultimately occurred.

== Philanthropy and ongoing art dealership ==
In 2007, Loria funded an extensive restoration of Yale University's Art + Architecture Building, as well as construction of a new building for the History of Art. The Jeffrey Loria Center for the History of Art opened in 2008.

Loria is an honorary member of the board of overseers of the Benjamin N. Cardozo School of Law of Yeshiva University in New York. He formerly served on the board of the Art Dealers Association of America.

Loria still runs his art dealership.

== Personal life ==
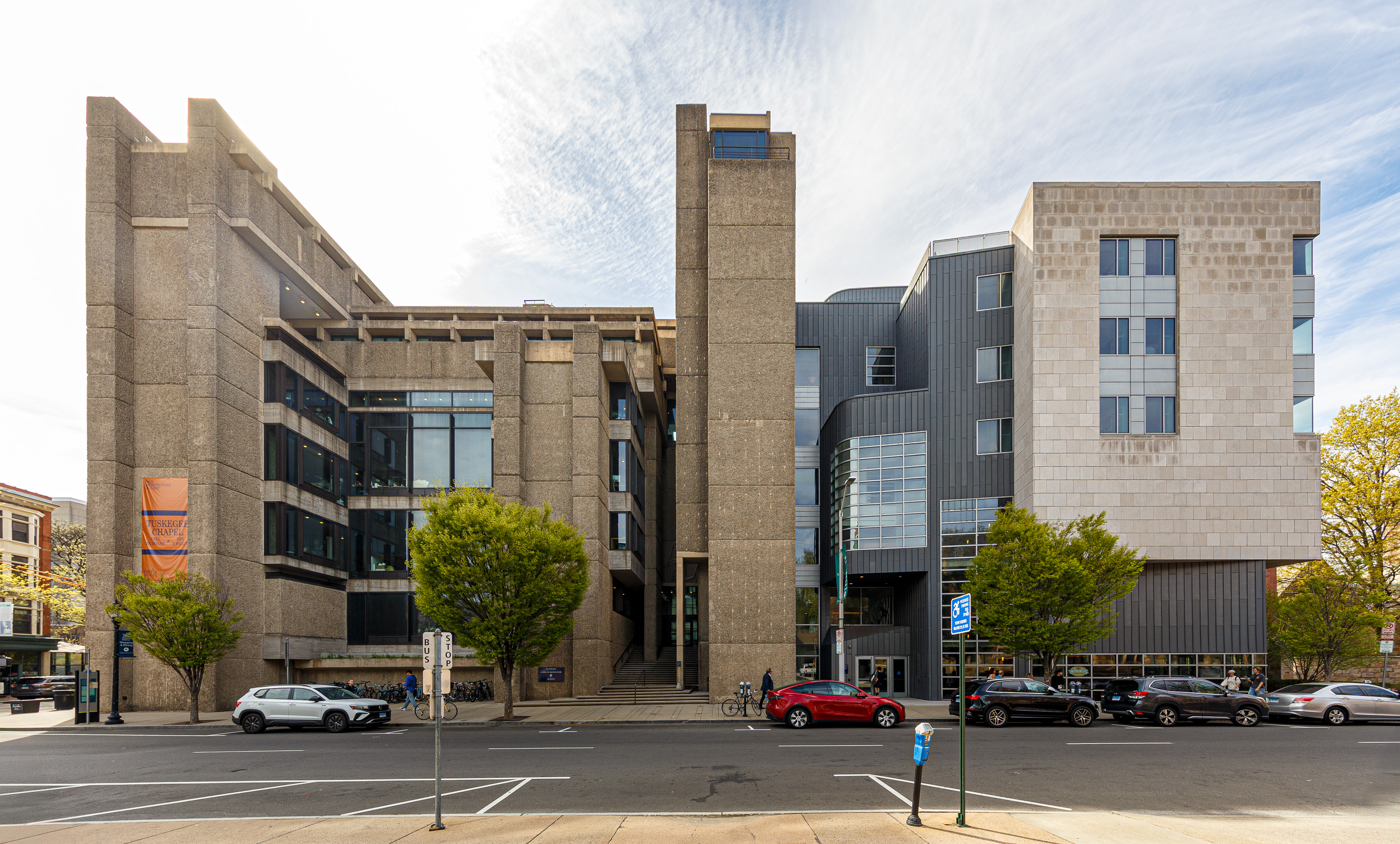
Loria Center at right

In 1980, he married Sivia Samson (divorced from attorney Allen Samson); they divorced in 2005. His stepson, David Samson, served as the Marlins team president until September 2017. In 2007, Loria married Julie Lavin Loria.

Loria divides his time between homes in New York and South Florida.
