= David Samson (baseball) =

American baseball executive (born 1968)

David P. Samson
- Born: February 26, 1968 (age 58); Milwaukee, Wisconsin, U.S.
- Education: University of Wisconsin (B.A.); Yeshiva University (J.D.)
- Occupation: Podcaster
- Employer(s): CBS Sports and Meadowlark Media
- Spouse: Cindi Jacobs (m. 1990; div. 2019)
- Children: 3
- Parent(s): Allen Lawrence Samson; Sivia Warshauer
- Family: Jeffrey Loria (step-father)

David P. Samson (born February 26, 1968) is an American former sports executive. He was the president of the Miami Marlins of Major League Baseball from 2002 until September 2017. He held the title of executive vice president with the Montreal Expos from 1999 to 2002, working in both Montreal and Miami under team owner and former stepfather Jeffrey Loria.

== Career ==
=== Montreal Expos (1999–2002) ===
Samson was named executive vice president of the Montreal Expos in December 1999, shortly after his stepfather, Jeffrey Loria, purchased the ownership stake of Claude Brochu and became the principal owner on December 9. The tenure of Loria and Samson in Montreal was brief, however. Samson played a key role in negotiating the sale of the Expos and the subsequent purchase of the Florida Marlins in 2002. Loria sold the Expos to a Delaware partnership, Expos Baseball, LP. The partnership had been formed by a vote of the Major League Baseball owners so that Loria would be free to purchase the Marlins from John W. Henry, who needed to sell the South Florida club to be able to complete the purchase of the Boston Red Sox. The Expos later were moved to Washington, D.C., by the MLB.

In July 2002, a group of former minority partners in the Expos ownership group filed an unsuccessful lawsuit in Miami federal district court against Samson, Loria, MLB Commissioner Bud Selig, MLB Chief Operating Officer Bob DuPuy, the commissioner's office, and others, alleging that the defendants had violated the Racketeer Influenced and Corrupt Organizations Act (RICO) in the course of selling the Expos. The court referred the suit to a three-judge arbitration panel in New York City, which in November 2004 ruled unanimously against the plaintiffs on all of their claims, finding that the defendants had committed no fraud or breach of fiduciary duties.

After going 79–83 in 2002 and finishing fourth in the NL East, the Marlins signed free agent Ivan "Pudge" Rodriguez and made several more key additions for 2003. They surprised the baseball world with a 91–71 record and winning the team's second World Series.

=== Subsequent ballpark-related lawsuit ===
South Florida businessman Norman Braman filed a lawsuit in January 2008 alleging that the deal between the Marlins and Miami-Dade County to fund the new stadium was an illegal use of taxpayer money, which was intended to combat urban blight and should be subject to a public vote. All seven counts of the lawsuit were eventually dismissed, the last on November 21, 2008, by Miami-Dade Circuit Judge Jeri Beth Cohen.

Due to the nearly year-long delay caused by the Braman lawsuit, the original timeline for the construction of the stadium was delayed and the opening date was pushed back from the 2011 season to the 2012 season. The official groundbreaking ceremony was held on July 18, 2009, in front of 5,000 fans. The ballpark and the newly rechristened Miami Marlins, hosted their first regular season game on April 4, 2012, against the St. Louis Cardinals.

Samson was let go as president of the Marlins after the 2017 season, when a group led by Bruce Sherman and Derek Jeter purchased the team.

== Podcasts ==
Samson hosts his own podcast, Nothing Personal with David Samson. He also regularly appears on Pablo Torre Finds Out and The Dan Le Batard Show.

== Personal life ==
Samson was married to Cindi Jacobs until their divorce in 2019. Samson and Jacobs have three children, Hannah, Kyra, and Caleb. Kyra worked in television at Watch What Happens Live with Andy Cohen and Jeopardy! She passed away in 2026 at age 28, nine months after being diagnosed with glioblastoma.

Samson stated he has lifelong body dysmorphia and was anorexic while overseeing the Marlins, running marathons and weighing himself up to 25 times a day.

== Non-baseball appearances ==
- He was a contestant on Survivor: Cagayan, the 28th season of CBS reality show Survivor, where he was the first contestant voted out and finished in 18th place.
- He made his acting debut in a play, "Not Ready for Primetime," portraying Lorne Michaels, the creator of Saturday Night Live, in March 2014.
