= John McHale Jr. =

American lawyer

John McHale, Jr. is a Major League Baseball executive, who works as the league's chief information officer (CIO) and executive vice president of administration.

McHale was previously the assistant general manager of the Colorado Rockies in 1993, the president of the Detroit Tigers from 1995 to 2001, and chief operating officer of the Tampa Bay Devil Rays from 2001 to 2002.

== Early life and career ==
His father, John McHale, was a former major league baseball player and a longtime MLB executive with several organizations. His mother, Patty, is a member of the Briggs family that owned part or all of the Tigers franchise from 1919 to 1956.

Like his father, McHale was born in Detroit and also graduated from the University of Notre Dame, in 1971. At Notre Dame, he played defensive end and linebacker for the Fighting Irish under head coach Ara Parseghian. McHale received law degrees from Boston College Law School in 1975 and the Georgetown University Law Center in 1982. McHale attended Marist High School in Chamblee, Georgia, while his father was general manager of the Atlanta Braves.

McHale practiced law in the Denver area from 1981 to 1991 before entering baseball.

== Colorado Rockies ==
As an attorney, McHale served on the board of the Denver Metropolitan MLB Stadium District. He negotiated a future stadium deal with Jerry McMorris, the owner and president of the Colorado Rockies. In October 1991, McHale was named executive vice president of baseball operations of the Rockies, which did not begin play until 1993. Just before that inaugural season, McHale was named executive vice president of operations. Baseball America notes that, in the latter role, McHale filled the role of an assistant general manager. During his time with the Rockies, McHale gained experience in the planning and financing of Coors Field, which would open to wide acclaim in 1995.

== Detroit Tigers ==
McHale joined the Detroit Tigers in 1995 as president and chief executive officer (CEO), taking over day-to-day franchise operations from team owner Mike Ilitch. It was a homecoming for McHale, who was a native Detroiter and lifelong Tigers fan.

McHale inherited a staff including the general manager Joe Klein and the longtime manager Sparky Anderson. In 1995, McHale suspended Anderson when he refused to manage replacement players in spring training games during the 1994–95 Major League Baseball strike. Klein, who had wanted Anderson fired and had the disadvantage of never before working with McHale, was eventually fired himself. Klein was replaced by the young general manager Randy Smith, who previously had worked with McHale when both were with the Colorado Rockies organization. Anderson, who eventually retired on his own accord following the 1995 season, recalled the situation as "dysfunctional", although he had faith in McHale.

McHale's major task was to seek out a new stadium to replace the aging Tiger Stadium, which lacked many modern amenities and had some of the smallest annual attendance figures in baseball. McHale said that, without a new stadium, the Tigers would be forced to maintain low payroll for players, making it more difficult for them to compete against the big-market teams. The payroll limitations of the era eventually played a part in the departure of the popular team players Cecil Fielder and Travis Fryman. In 1996, Detroit voters approved financing for a new downtown ballpark, with construction commencing in 1997. McHale was instrumental and successful in the planning and financing of the new stadium, Comerica Park, which opened in 2000. The new stadium paid off as the team hosted 2.35 million fans – the second-highest total in team history. McHale, in an effort to attract and develop a strong pitching staff, had designed the field dimensions to make the park more pitcher-friendly, which was in contrast to the hitter-friendly dimensions of Tiger Stadium. This immediately drew the ire of Tigers' hitters and fans, with Tigers outfielder Bobby Higginson proclaiming it "Comerica National Park". The fences were eventually brought in following McHale's departure from the organization, although it continues to be placed near the top of all ballparks for triples.

McHale accomplished his goal of a new ballpark, but along with GM Smith was unable to turn around the struggling Tigers. He left the Tigers organization in summer 2001, taking a job as the chief operating officer of the Tampa Bay Devil Rays. The Tigers' owner, Ilitch, once again assumed the title of team president and the Detroit Red Wings executive Jim Devellano, a longtime Ilitch employee, was named senior vice president of the Tigers. The president, CEO (and eventually GM) roles were assumed by Dave Dombrowski in late 2001.
