= John McHale (baseball) =

American baseball player (1921–2008)

- First baseman
- Born: September 21, 1921; Detroit, Michigan, U.S.
- Died: January 17, 2008 (aged 86); Stuart, Florida, U.S.
- Batted: Left Threw: Right

MLB debut
- May 28, 1943, for the Detroit Tigers

Last MLB appearance
- April 23, 1948, for the Detroit Tigers

MLB statistics
- Batting average: .193
- Home runs: 3
- Runs batted in: 12
- Stats at Baseball Reference

Teams
- Detroit Tigers (1943–1945, 1947–1948)

Career highlights and awards
- World Series champion (1945); Montreal Expos Hall of Fame

Member of the Canadian

Baseball Hall of Fame
- Induction: 1997

John Joseph McHale (September 21, 1921 – January 17, 2008) was an American professional baseball player and executive. He played in Major League Baseball (MLB) as a first baseman for the Detroit Tigers during the 1940s, and later served as the general manager of the Tigers, Milwaukee / Atlanta Braves, and Montreal Expos. He was the first president and executive director of the Expos during their maiden years in the National League, and owned ten percent of the team. His son John McHale Jr. became an MLB executive vice president.

== Detroit Tigers' player and executive ==
McHale was born in the city of Detroit, Michigan, and attended Detroit Catholic Central High School (Class of 1938) and the University of Notre Dame. He batted left-handed and threw right-handed, stood 6 feet (1.8 m) tall, and his weight was 200 pounds (91 kg). He signed with his hometown Tigers in 1941 and two years later made his first MLB appearance. In five seasons and 64 games with the Tigers (1943–45, 1947–48), McHale compiled a batting average of .193 with 22 hits. He was hitless in three at bats in the 1945 World Series, in which Detroit defeated the Chicago Cubs. Defensively, he recorded a .995 fielding percentage as a first baseman with only one error in 214 total chances.

After the 1948 season, McHale, who had recently married a niece of team owner Walter Briggs Sr., retired from the field for a job in the Tiger front office as assistant farm system director. In 1953, he became director of minor league operations for the Tigers and was named general manager early in the 1957 season at the young age of 35. But after less than two full seasons, he was recruited by the defending NL champion Braves, where he succeeded John J. Quinn as general manager in January 1959. Three years later, he added the title of club president.

== Career in Milwaukee and Atlanta ==
As it turned out, McHale presided over the slow decline of the Braves on the field. While superstar Hank Aaron was in the prime of his career, eventual Hall of Famers Warren Spahn and Eddie Mathews—along with Del Crandall, Lew Burdette, Joe Adcock and other stars of the Braves' 1957–58 NL championship clubs—aged and fell off in production. Meanwhile, the young players developed by the team's farm system could not pick up the slack. However, according to an April 8, 1963 article in Sports Illustrated, it was McHale himself who disposed of young talent and decimated the farm system: "With General Manager John McHale trading away brilliant young pitchers (Joey Jay and Juan Pizarro) and solid everyday performers like Billy Bruton and Joe Adcock, and then unloading over half the once fertile farm clubs, Bragan will have to depend on old Braves who may prefer peace to war."

As the Braves slipped into the middle ranks of the National League, attendance at Milwaukee County Stadium declined precipitously. In 1963, the club was sold to a group of Chicago-based investors. By 1964, the Braves were rumored (correctly) to be moving to Atlanta. In 1965, during their lame-duck season in Milwaukee, McHale was the figurehead for a supremely unpopular ownership.

In 1966, the Atlanta Braves' first year, the club started slowly. McHale was replaced as general manager in mid-season by Paul Richards, a former Tiger teammate of McHale's and a legend in Georgia's capital since his days as playing manager of the Atlanta Crackers of the Southern Association from 1938 to 1942. After the season, McHale left the Braves to replace Lee MacPhail as the chief aide to Baseball Commissioner William Eckert.

== Candidacy for Baseball Commissioner ==
In 1968, the year before the National League expanded to 12 teams, McHale was named president of the newly born Montreal Expos by their owner, Seagrams heir Charles Bronfman. A few weeks after McHale's appointment, Eckert was fired as commissioner and McHale emerged as a leading contender to succeed his former boss, along with executives Michael Burke of the New York Yankees and Chub Feeney of the San Francisco Giants.

He had strong support in the American League, but NL owners—who wanted McHale's experienced hand turned toward the fledgling Expo franchise—intervened and McHale's candidacy was halted. The commissionership eventually went to National League attorney Bowie Kuhn.

== Founding president of the Montréal Expos ==
Putting the commissioner election behind him, McHale focused on building the first MLB franchise located in Canada. While McHale concentrated on upper management responsibilities during his first decade with the Expos, he eventually assumed their general manager portfolio as well, and it was during his watch (as GM from 1978 to 1984) that the Expos achieved their only playoff appearance, in 1981. McHale resigned as general manager in favor of Murray Cook at the close of the 1984 season. He announced on September 5, 1986 becoming Expos deputy chairman upon his retirement as president and chief operating officer effective October 1. Claude Brochu succeeded him in both capacities. McHale remained as the team's chief executive officer until December 31, 1987.

McHale was also the last non-Hall of Fame member of the Hall's Veterans Committee, having been grandfathered in when the structure of the committee was updated in 2001. He died in Stuart, Florida, at age 86.

Sporting positions
Preceded by Walter Briggs Jr.	Detroit Tigers General Manager; 1957–1959	Succeeded by Rick Ferrell
Preceded by John Quinn	Milwaukee/Atlanta Braves General Manager; 1959–1966	Succeeded by Paul Richards
Preceded by Lou Perini	Milwaukee/Atlanta Braves President; 1961–1966	Succeeded by Bill Bartholomay
Preceded by Franchise established	Montreal Expos President; 1968–1986	Succeeded by Claude Brochu
Preceded by Charlie Fox	Montreal Expos General Manager; 1978–1984	Succeeded by Murray Cook
