= John McHale (footballer) =

Australian rules footballer

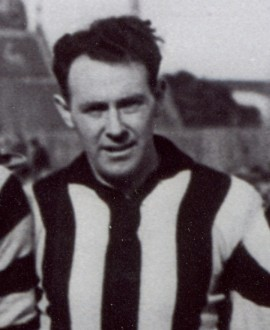
- McHale in 1944

Personal information
- Full name: John Joseph McHale
- Born: 13 January 1915
- Died: 21 June 2003 (aged 88)
- Original team: North Melbourne Old Boys
- Height: 185 cm (6 ft 1 in)
- Weight: 86 kg (190 lb)

Playing career^{1}
| Years | Club | Games (Goals) |
| 1941–1944 | Collingwood | 34 (28) |
- ^{1} Playing statistics correct to the end of 1944.

John Joseph McHale (13 January 1915 – 21 June 2003) was an Australian rules footballer who played with Collingwood in the Victorian Football League (VFL).

McHale was the son of Jock McHale, the Collingwood coach who has "legend" status in the Australian Football Hall of Fame. His father was coach of Collingwood while he was at the club but he still served an apprenticeship in the seconds before making it into the senior team. He was captain of the seconds side which won a premiership in 1940.

He made six senior appearances for Collingwood in the 1941 VFL season but didn't feature in any fixtures the following year. In 1943 he returned to the seniors and played in 14 of the first 15 rounds. He played another 14 games in the 1944 VFL season but then retired, for business reasons.

Like his father, McHale continued to serve Collingwood in an off the field capacity once he retired and was a member of the club committee for many years. He served as Collingwood's vice president from 1972 to 1974 and again from 1977 until 1980.
