= Claude Brochu =

Canadian businessman and baseball executive (born 1944)

- Born: October 29, 1944 (age 81); Quebec City, Quebec Canada

Claude Brochu, CM (born October 29, 1944), is a Canadian businessman best known as former president and principal owner of the Montreal Expos.

== Early life and career ==
Brochu was born on October 29, 1944, in Quebec City, Quebec.

He was employed by Adams Distilleries from 1976 to 1978, then by the Seagram distillery, owned by the Bronfman family, from 1978 to 1986, where he served as the executive vice-president of marketing for the corporation's Canadian operations from 1982 to 1986.

== Montreal Expos ==
In September 1986, Montreal Expos owner Charles Bronfman chose Brochu to succeed the retiring John McHale as president and chief operating officer of the baseball club.

He led a consortium of local investors that bought the Expos from Bronfman for CA$100 million (equivalent to $209 million in 2025). The purchase was completed 6 1/2 months later on June 14, 1991. The deal prevented a threatened move to Arizona or to Miami, where retired Miami banker Lou Poller had attempted to purchase and move them. Brochu used $2 million (equivalent to $4 million in 2025) of his own to make this purchase. He was the largest shareholder, with 7% of the shares, and became managing general partner.

However, the team's other partners considered their investments to be the equivalent of charitable donations. They let it be known to Brochu that they would not commit any more money beyond their initial investment. As a result, even though Montreal was the fifth-largest market in baseball, Brochu was forced to run the Expos on a shoestring budget. Despite this, the Expos managed to assemble a core of players that included Moisés Alou, Marquis Grissom, Larry Walker and John Wetteland. In the 1994 Montreal Expos season, the team, led by manager Felipe Alou, had the best record in the majors when the players' strike cut the season short. They were poised to run away with the National League East, with most projections having them winning as many as 105 games.

In the 1994-95 offseason, Brochu ordered general manager Kevin Malone to cut ties with several of the stars of that season. In several transactions that took place between April 5–8, Wetteland was traded to the New York Yankees, Ken Hill to the St. Louis Cardinals, and Grissom to the Atlanta Braves. Walker was a free agent, and the Expos allowed him to go to the Colorado Rockies without getting anything in return. The fans and press were savage in their condemnation of the fire sale. Years later, Brochu told writer Jonah Keri that he didn't want to unload Wetteland, Hill, Grissom, and Walker, but had no choice because of a dangerous depletion of capital. Had the other partners been willing to put the necessary money in, he said, he would have kept the players.

Brochu's plan to save the team from bankruptcy was to build a new baseball-only park in downtown Montreal, which would be named Labatt Park. He asked for subsidies from the Canadian and Quebec governments of the time, but when this attempt failed, he resigned in 1998 and sold his shares to New York art dealer Jeffrey Loria.

In 2001, Brochu published the book My Turn at Bat: The Sad Saga of the Expos, which blamed Quebec ex-premier Lucien Bouchard for the sale of the baseball team. Bouchard had told him that he wasn't willing to authorize public funding for a new park when he was being forced to close hospitals.

== Awards and honors ==
- Canada's Baseball Man of the Year, 1990
- In 1996, he received the Order of Canada along with Angèle Dubeau, Gordon A. Smith and Trevor Payne.
