= Kevin Malone (baseball) =

American baseball executive (born 1957)

- Born: August 6, 1957 (age 68); San Diego, California, U.S.
- Occupation: Baseball executive

Kevin Patrick Malone (born August 6, 1957) is an American former baseball general manager for the Montreal Expos and Los Angeles Dodgers. As of May 2025, Malone is a Senior Advisor on Human Trafficking at the United States Department of Health and Human Services (HHS).

== Early life ==
Malone attended the University of Louisville, where he played baseball. He was selected by the Cleveland Indians in the 1980 draft and played as a second baseman in their minor league system for the Batavia Trojans and Auburn Americans. His playing career over by 1984, he found work as a scout in the California Angels organization from 1985 to 1987, and then the Montreal Expos in 1987.

He became a hitting instructor for the Jamestown Expos of the New York–Penn League in 1988 and then became the east coast scouting supervisor for the Minnesota Twins from 1988 to 1991.

== General manager ==
Malone became the Expos Director of Scouting in 1991 and became the Expos General Manager in 1994. He was in charge of orchestrating the Expos "fire sale" in 1995 where they had four days to get rid of several expensive contracts to slash the payroll. He traded or released several star players from what had been a successful team the previous season. Departing were Larry Walker, John Wetteland, Ken Hill and Marquis Grissom. Malone resigned following the season.

After a few years as assistant general manager with the Baltimore Orioles, Malone was hired as the GM of the Los Angeles Dodgers on September 11, 1998. When he was hired, he described himself as the "new sheriff in town." He also nicknamed himself "Dodger Boy". Malone's tenure in Los Angeles, under the new News Corporation owners led to several expensive high salaried stars being signed to huge contracts, including Kevin Brown, Shawn Green and Gary Sheffield.

In April 2001, he got into a verbal argument with a Padres fan in San Diego, who was heckling Sheffield. He resigned a few days later.

Sporting positions
Preceded by Dan Duquette	Montreal Expos General Manager; 1994–95	Succeeded by Jim Beattie
Preceded by Tommy Lasorda	Los Angeles Dodgers General Manager; 1998–2001	Succeeded by Dave Wallace
