= Trion High School =

Public high school in Trion, Georgia, United States

Location
- 919 Allgood Street; Trion, Georgia 30753; United States; 34.53873°N 85.32558°W

Information
- School type: Public
- Established: 1938
- School district: Trion City School District
- NCES District ID: 1305130
- NCES School ID: 130513002467
- Principal: Bryan Edge
- Teaching staff: 29.30 (FTE)
- Grades: 9 -12
- Enrollment: 396 (2023-2024)
- Student to teacher ratio: 13.52
- Colors: Blue and white
- Athletics conference: 6-A
- Mascot: Bulldog
- Website: Official website

Trion High School is a public high school located in Trion, Georgia, United States. It is part of the Trion City School District in Chattooga County.

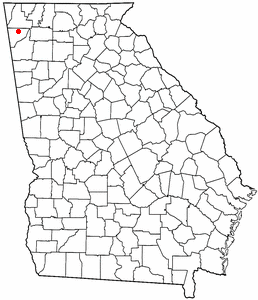
Map of Trion, Georgia

The school was built in 1938 by L.C. "Sadd" Dalton. The original location was beside the Trion Recreation Department. Due to a flood in 1990, a new school was built at 919 Allgood Street. It was completed in 1996.

== Administration ==
- District superintendent: Phil Williams
- Principal: Bryan Edge

== Mascot and rival ==
Trion's mascot is the bulldog, and its colors are blue and white.

== Honors and awards ==
In 2008, Trion High School was named a Georgia School of Excellence. Trion was named one of seven National Blue Ribbon Schools in the state in 2009.

The football team has had fourteen consecutive trips to the high school playoffs (1990–2004) and twice won the Georgia Class B High School State Football Championship. THS defeated Quitman 21–18 in 1957 to gain the crown, and repeated this in 1974 against Lincoln County with a 7–0 win. In 2003, the Trion football team traveled to the Georgia Dome to play Lincoln County in the state playoffs.

In 2008, 2009, and 2010, the cheerleaders won back-to-back state championships.

In 2009, Trion was named one of the top 25 Georgia high schools, ranked by average SAT scores. The school's graduation test scores are always in the top percentiles as well. The class of 2011 made perfect scores on the reading and writing portion, and scored 95% in all other areas. The class of 2010 had a 100% graduation rate.

== Extracurricular activities ==
For such a small school, Trion High School offers a variety of extracurricular activities. Sports include football, basketball, softball, volleyball, baseball, wrestling, football and competition cheerleading, tennis, soccer, and band. Clubs offered at THS include Beta Club, Mu Alpha Theta, Spanish Club, Book Club, FBLA, FCCLA, FFA, TSA, and FCA.

THS also offers a journalism class, which puts out the Bulldog Barker paper every Wednesday, and publishes a K-12 yearbook each year.

The Pride of Trion marching band is a Class A band.

== Notable alumni ==
- Rick Camp, former professional baseball player (Atlanta Braves)
- Brody Malone, US Olympic gymnast (2020)
