= Rick Camp Game =

1985 baseball game between the New York Mets and Atlanta Braves

New York Mets	Atlanta Braves
16	13
	1	2	3	4	5	6	7	8	9	10	11	12	13	14	15	16	17	18	19	R	H	E
New York Mets	1	0	0	4	0	1	0	1	1	0	0	0	2	0	0	0	0	1	5	16	28	2
Atlanta Braves	1	0	2	0	1	0	0	4	0	0	0	0	2	0	0	0	0	1	2	13	18	3
- Date: July 4–5, 1985
- Venue: Atlanta–Fulton County Stadium
- City: Atlanta, Georgia
- Managers: Davey Johnson (NYM); Eddie Haas (ATL)
- Attendance: 44,947
- Television: WTBS (ATL); WOR (NYM)
- TV announcers: Ernie Johnson and John Sterling; Ralph Kiner, Steve Zabriskie and Tim McCarver
- Radio: WSB (ATL); WHN (NYM)
- Radio announcers: Pete Van Wieren and Skip Caray; Bob Murphy and Gary Thorne

On July 4, 1985, the New York Mets beat the Atlanta Braves 16–13 in a 19-inning Major League Baseball (MLB) contest that featured Keith Hernandez hitting for the cycle, Mets manager Davey Johnson being ejected, and the Braves coming back to tie the game twice in extra innings, most notably in the bottom of the 18th.

The game was especially highlighted by relief pitcher Rick Camp, a career .060 hitter at the time with no home runs, batting only because the Braves had no position players left, shockingly hitting a solo home run on a 0–2 pitch in the 18th off of Tom Gorman to re-tie the game at 11–11. As a result, it has become known simply as the Rick Camp game.

== Game ==
Following a 90-minute rain delay, the game was set to begin around 9:00 p.m. EDT. Both teams scored a run in the first inning. In the top of the first, Gary Carter drove in Keith Hernandez with a single. The Braves countered with Claudell Washington leading the frame off with a triple, then scoring on a Rafael Ramírez groundout.

Mets starter Dwight Gooden continued to struggle by walking three of the next four batters to load the bases with two outs. He ultimately managed to escape the jam by forcing a Rick Cerone groundout to end the Atlanta threat.

After 2 1/3 innings, the rain came down again for another 41 minutes, consequently bouncing Gooden from the game. Mets manager Davey Johnson played the game under protest after he was not allowed to make a double-switch when Gooden left the game. Crew chief Terry Tata ruled that Mets reliever Roger McDowell had officially entered the game when he came onto the field to inspect the mound after the delay. The Braves then took a 3–1 lead in the third after the rain delay.

Braves manager Eddie Haas stuck with his starter Rick Mahler following the second delay. In the top of the fourth, Mets rallied for four runs to take a 5–3 lead, thanks in part to a Wally Backman RBI single into center field off Braves reliever Jeff Dedmon. In the bottom of the fourth, Terry Leach came in to relieve Roger McDowell, who had been pinch-hit for by Clint Hurdle in the top of the frame, and only allowed one run on four hits over the next four innings.

In the top of the sixth inning, Keith Hernandez hit what appeared to be a single, one of the two hits he needed to complete the cycle, but umpire Terry Tata ruled that his line drive to center had been caught by Dale Murphy. Hernandez hit a home run in the eighth and a single in the 12th to complete the cycle.

In the bottom of the eighth, with the Mets leading 7–5, Dale Murphy hit a bases-clearing double off Jesse Orosco to give the Braves the 8–7 lead. The Mets answered with a run in the ninth with consecutive singles from Howard Johnson, Danny Heep, and Lenny Dykstra against Bruce Sutter.

The score remained tied until the 13th, when Howard Johnson hit a two-run homer off of Terry Forster to put the Mets ahead 10–8. The Braves' Terry Harper tied it again with a home run in the bottom of the inning. In the top of 17th, with the score tied at 10, both Davey Johnson and Darryl Strawberry got ejected for arguing balls and strikes.

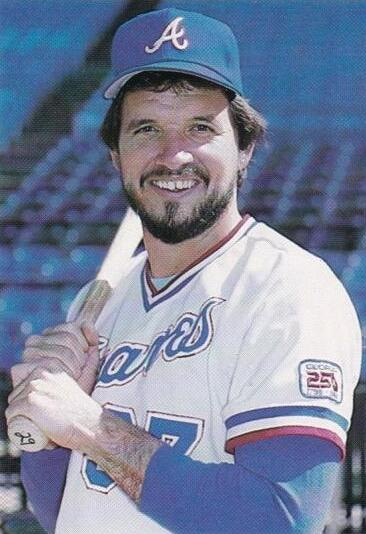
Rick Camp with the Braves c. 1983

The Mets, however, grabbed an 11–10 lead in the 18th on a Lenny Dykstra sacrifice fly. In the bottom of the 18th, Braves pitcher Rick Camp was batting against Tom Gorman and proceeded to hit the 0–2 pitch for a home run over the left field wall, the only home run Camp hit in his professional career, minor leagues included.

Gary Carter led off the 19th with a single and after a sacrifice, pinch-hitter Rusty Staub was walked intentionally. Ray Knight, who had left the bases full three times already, came through with an RBI double to make it 12–11. The Mets would tack on four more runs in the 19th to go up 16–11.

The Mets then called in Ron Darling, the seventh Mets pitcher, to close it out. Darling would allow two unearned runs to cut the lead to 16–13, and with two on and two out, Camp again stepped to the plate. Another homer would have tied the game yet again, but this time the Braves pitcher struck out, finally ending the contest.

Once the game was over, even though the date/time was July 5, 3:55 a.m., the Braves' stadium crew shot off the scheduled Fourth of July post-game fireworks for the fans who endured to the end. As one final bizarre extra, calls from local residents came in to the emergency services 911 center given they were not aware these were planned fireworks. This was the second latest any major league game has ever ended. Eight years later, the record was topped by a doubleheader between the San Diego Padres and the Philadelphia Phillies in July 1993, which saw the second game (July 3) end at 4:40 a.m., less than an hour before sunrise. It also occurred after rain had delayed the start of the first game (July 2) that saw it end past 1 a.m. Philadelphia's Veterans Stadium also had a scheduled fireworks display that night/morning but postponed it. Coincidentally, the second game also featured a notable hit by a relief pitcher, as Mitch Williams' walk-off base hit in the bottom of the ninth inning off of Trevor Hoffman won the game for the Phillies, 6–5. It was one of just three total hits in Williams' career, and the final plate appearance of his career as well.

In total, there were 46 hits, 22 walks, 37 runners left on base, five errors, and two ejections. The time of the game was 6 hours, 10 minutes, not counting the rain delays, which tacked on more than two hours.

== Linescore ==
July 4, 1985 at Atlanta–Fulton County Stadium the "Rick Camp Game"
Team	1	2	3	4	5	6	7	8	9	10	11	12	13	14	15	16	17	18	19	R	H	E
New York Mets (41–35)	1	0	0	4	0	0	1	1	1	0	0	0	2	0	0	0	0	1	5	16	28	2
Atlanta Braves (34–42)	1	0	2	0	1	0	0	4	0	0	0	0	2	0	0	0	0	1	2	13	18	3
WP: Tom Gorman (4–3) LP: Rick Camp (2–4); Home runs: NYM: Keith Hernandez (1), Howard Johnson (2); ATL: Terry Harper (2), Rick Camp (1); Attendance: 44,947; Umpires: Terry Tata (HP), Jerry Crawford (1B), Gerry Davis (2B), Lanny Harris (3B); Ejections: Davey Johnson, Darryl Strawberry Boxscore

== See also ==
- Braves–Mets rivalry
- List of nicknamed MLB games and plays
