= Grand Slam Single =

Baseball play that ended Game 5 of the 1999 National League Championship Series

The Grand Slam Single was a baseball play that ended Game 5 of the 1999 National League Championship Series, contested between the rival New York Mets and Atlanta Braves, on October 17, 1999, at Shea Stadium in New York City. Mets player Robin Ventura recorded a game-winning hit, and although it cleared the outfield fences and normally would have been ruled a grand slam, he never completed his trip around the bases due to the on-field celebration; thus, it was only credited as a single.

== The play ==
The game was tied 2–2, going into the top of the 15th inning, until Mets pitcher Octavio Dotel gave up an RBI triple to Keith Lockhart, giving the Braves a 3–2 lead. In the bottom of the 15th inning, the Mets loaded the bases against Braves relief pitcher Kevin McGlinchy. Mets catcher Todd Pratt drew a bases loaded walk, tying the score 3–3.

The next batter was Mets third baseman Robin Ventura. Ventura crushed the 2–1 pitch over the wall in right-center for an ostensible grand slam, winning the game for the Mets and driving the Mets players and fans into a frenzied celebration. Ventura, however, never reached second base as Todd Pratt, the runner who was on first, picked up Ventura in celebration. Subsequently, Ventura was mobbed by his teammates, never finishing his trot around the bases. Because he failed to touch all four bases, the hit was officially scored a single. Roger Cedeño, the runner on third at the time, was ruled the only runner to have crossed home plate before the on-field celebration began and the Mets were awarded a 4–3 victory. Thus, Ventura was credited with only a single and one RBI.

A drive to right....back to Georgia! Gone, a grand slam!

— Bob Costas on the call for NBC.

Robin Ventura...the Mets win... 4-3! There will be a Game 6!

— Gary Thorne on the call for MLB International.

A 2-1 pitch... A drive in the air of deep right field, that ball headed to the wall...! That ball is out of here, out of here! A game winning grand slam home run off the bat of Robin Ventura, Ventura with a grand slam! They're mobbing him before he can get to second base! The Mets have won the ball game! Ventura hit it over the right-center fence. A game winning grand slam home run!

— Gary Cohen on the call on WFAN.

== Aftermath and legacy ==
With the win, the Mets were only the second team to force a Game 6 after losing the first three games of a best-of-seven series in MLB history. (The first team to do this were the Braves themselves against the San Diego Padres in the previous year). While the Mets won Game 5, they still trailed the series, three games to two. Two days after Game 5, the Braves and Mets had another extra inning thriller in Game 6, which saw Atlanta lose a 5–0 lead only to tie the game in the 8th and 10th inning before a walk with the bases loaded clinched victory and the series in the eleventh inning. The series win clinched their fifth and final pennant of the decade. The Braves then lost the 1999 World Series to New York's other team, the Yankees, four games to none.

Sports books in Las Vegas were put into an unusual situation with the "single." If Ventura had completed his trip around the bases, the final score would have been 7–3, in which case the game would have gone "over" the over–under line, which was 7 1/2. Instead, the final score of 4–3 put the game "under," meaning that many bettors who would have received payouts (if the hit was ruled a home run) did not.

The play remains one of the most memorable moments in Mets postseason history. Orel Hershiser, who played on the 1999 Mets remarked, "It will be right up there with Kirk Gibson's home run (Hershiser was a teammate of Gibson with the Los Angeles Dodgers during their championship season of 1988), Carlton Fisk, Bucky Dent. This one will be on that tape with them."

Had Ventura completed his trip around the bases, it would have been the first walk-off grand slam in MLB postseason history. That honor eventually went to Nelson Cruz, whose 11th inning grand slam won Game 2 of the 2011 ALCS for the Texas Rangers over the Detroit Tigers. The feat has since been replicated by Freddie Freeman of the Los Angeles Dodgers in Game 1 of the 2024 World Series against the New York Yankees.

== Other instances of "grand slam singles" ==
According to Baseball-Reference.com, there have been at least two other instances of "grand slam singles". Both occurred when a batter hit a grand slam but subsequently passed the runner ahead of him on the base paths, which according to the rules of Major League Baseball causes the runner who passes his teammate to be called out. This happened on July 9, 1970, when Dalton Jones of the Detroit Tigers passed teammate Don Wert in a game against the Boston Red Sox, leaving him with a three-RBI single.

It also occurred on July 4, 1976, when Tim McCarver of the Philadelphia Phillies passed teammate Garry Maddox during a 10–5 win in the first game of a doubleheader against the Pittsburgh Pirates, leaving him with a three-RBI single. In both cases, the other three runs still counted because only the player who passes his teammate is called out. The three baserunners are able to score. Both of these hits took place with fewer than two outs.

Prior to 1920, if a batter hit a walk-off home run, he would receive credit for advancing only as many bases as necessary for the winning run to score. Therefore, a walk-off grand slam in a tie game would have officially been scored as a single, and only one run would count. A review in the 1960s found 37 walk-off hits that would have been considered home runs under today's rules, but were instead ruled singles, doubles, or triples under the rules of the time. In April 1968, a committee voted to retroactively change these to home runs, but reversed their ruling a week later following public outrage about the decision extending Babe Ruth's then-record of MLB career home runs from 714 to 715. One such single that would be a grand slam under modern rules occurred on July 18, 1918, during a game between the New York Yankees and Detroit Tigers. With the bases loaded in a 2–2 game in the bottom of the tenth inning, Home Run Baker hit a ball into the upper deck at the Polo Grounds. However, under the rules of the day it was considered a single, and the Yankees won 3–2.
