= Trion, Georgia =

- Town
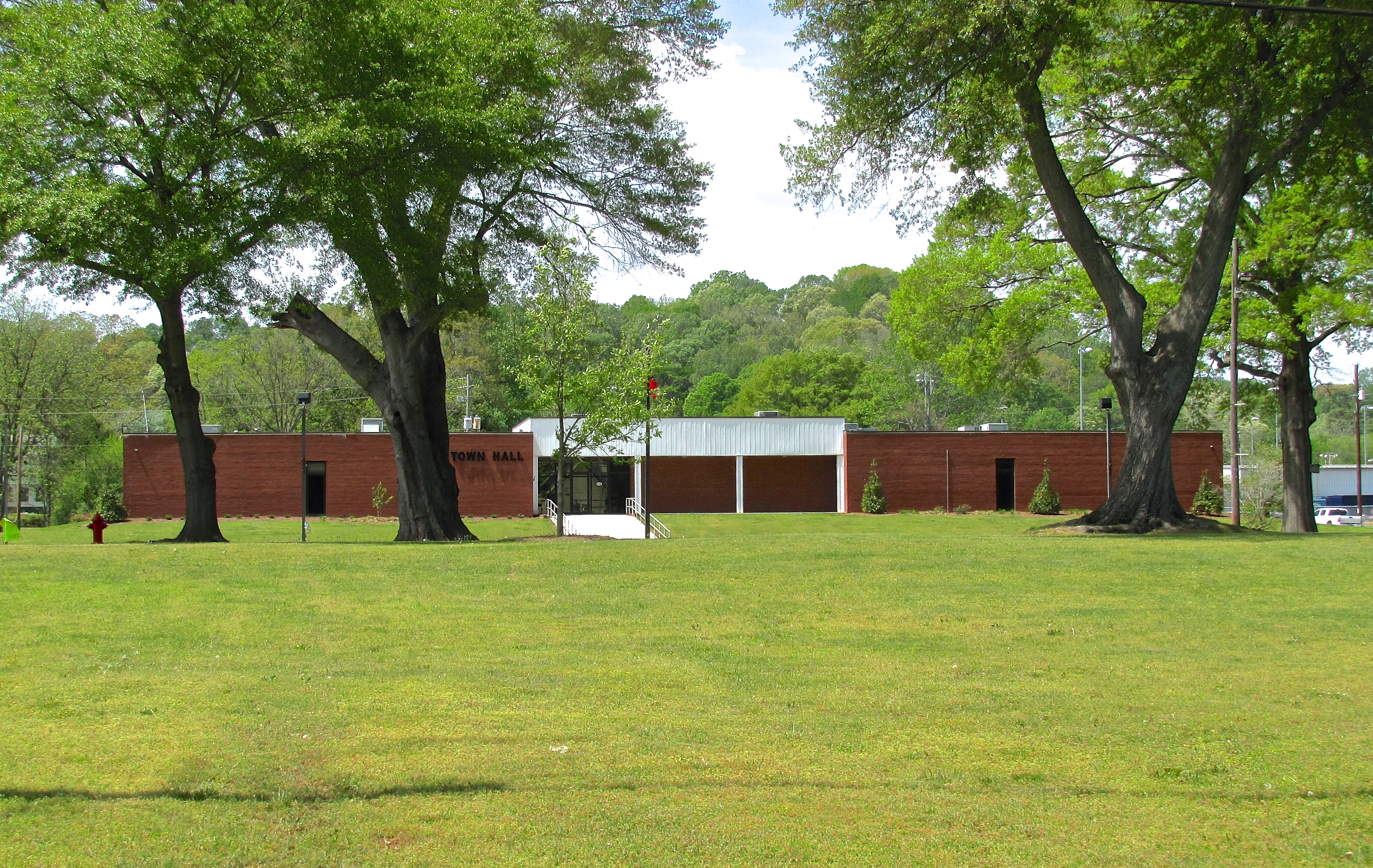
- Town hall

- Seal

- Location in Chattooga County and the state of Georgia
- Coordinates: 34°32′38″N 85°18′38″W
- Country: United States
- State: Georgia
- County: Chattooga

Area
  - Total: 4.07 sq mi (10.54 km^{2})
  - Land: 4.06 sq mi (10.51 km^{2})
  - Water: 0.012 sq mi (0.03 km^{2})
- Elevation: 659 ft (201 m)

Population (2020)
  - Total: 1,960
  - Density: 482.9/sq mi (186.45/km^{2})
- Time zone: UTC−5 (Eastern (EST))
  - Summer (DST): UTC−4 (EDT)
- ZIP code: 30753
- Area codes: 706/762
- FIPS code: 13-77540
- GNIS feature ID: 0333265
- Website: www.townoftrion.net

Trion is a town in Chattooga County, Georgia, United States. The population was 1,960 at the 2020 census, up from 1,827 at the 2010 census. Trion is the second-largest incorporated community in Chattooga County, which has a population of approximately 26,000. Trion is known as the denim capital of the world because of the Mount Vernon (formerly Riegel) manufacturing plant, which employs about 4,000 people.

== History ==
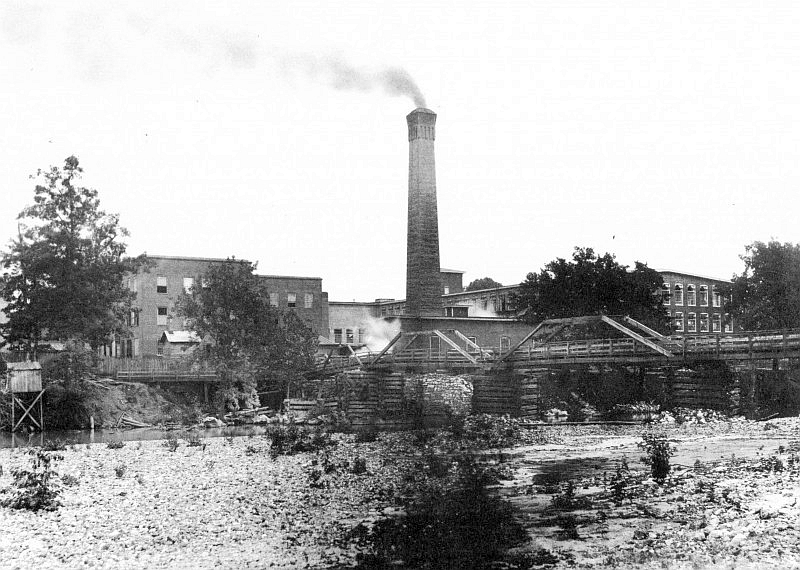
Trion Mill, 1895

Trion had its start in the 1840s when the Trion Mills cotton mill was established there. A post office called Trion Factory opened in 1847, and in 1904 the name was changed to Trion. The name "Trion" was chosen by the mill's three founders (Andrew Allgood, Spencer Marsh, and W.K. Briers) as a way to commemorate their partnership. The Georgia General Assembly incorporated Trion as a town in 1862.

Though the mill burned in 1875, it was eventually rebuilt, and evolved into what is now the Mount Vernon Mill No. 3.

== Geography ==
Trion is located in northern Chattooga County. U.S. Route 27 passes through the eastern part of the town, leading south 5 miles (8 km) to Summerville, the county seat, and north 12 miles (19 km) to LaFayette.

According to the United States Census Bureau, Trion has a total area of 3.9 square miles (10.0 km^{2}), of which 0.012 square miles (0.03 km^{2}), or 0.32%, is water. The Chattooga River, a tributary of the Coosa River, flows through the town.

== Demographics ==
Historical population
Census	Pop.	Note	%±
1880	513		—
1890	807		57.3%
1900	1,926		138.7%
1910	1,721		−10.6%
1920	1,533		−10.9%
1930	3,289		114.5%
1940	3,800		15.5%
1950	3,028		−20.3%
1960	2,227		−26.5%
1970	1,965		−11.8%
1980	1,732		−11.9%
1990	1,661		−4.1%
2000	1,993		20.0%
2010	1,827		−8.3%
2020	1,960		7.3%
U.S. Decennial Census

=== 2020 census ===
As of the 2020 census, Trion had a population of 1,960. The median age was 33.1 years. 30.6% of residents were under the age of 18 and 14.6% of residents were 65 years of age or older. For every 100 females there were 100.0 males, and for every 100 females age 18 and over there were 89.9 males age 18 and over.

86.6% of residents lived in urban areas, while 13.4% lived in rural areas.

There were 726 households in Trion, of which 39.7% had children under the age of 18 living in them. Of all households, 40.1% were married-couple households, 17.2% were households with a male householder and no spouse or partner present, and 35.1% were households with a female householder and no spouse or partner present. About 30.3% of all households were made up of individuals and 16.3% had someone living alone who was 65 years of age or older.

There were 831 housing units, of which 12.6% were vacant. The homeowner vacancy rate was 5.6% and the rental vacancy rate was 7.4%.

Trion racial composition
Race	Num.	Perc.
White (non-Hispanic)	1,297	66.17%
Black or African American (non-Hispanic)	40	2.04%
Native American	4	0.2%
Asian	4	0.2%
Other/Mixed	70	3.57%
Hispanic or Latino	545	27.81%

=== 2000 census ===
At the 2000 census, there were 1,993 people, 832 households and 524 families residing in the town. The population density was 500.9 people per square mile (193.4 people/km^{2}). There were 906 housing units at an average density of 227.7 units per square mile (87.9 units/km^{2}). The racial make-up of the town was 90.72% White, 2.81% African American, 0.40% Asian, 0.05% Pacific Islander, 4.87% from other races and 1.15% from two or more races. Hispanic or Latino of any race were 13.25% of the population.

There were 832 households, of which 26.2% had children under the age of 18 living with them, 44.5% were married couples living together, 12.6% had a female householder with no husband present and 36.9% were non-families. 31.9% of all households were made up of individuals, and 20.4% had someone living alone who was 65 years of age or older. The average household size was 2.40 and the average family size was 2.92.

21.7% of the population were under the age of 18, 10.9% from 18 to 24, 26.8% from 25 to 44, 18.4% from 45 to 64 and 22.2% were 65 years of age or older. The median age was 37 years. For every 100 females, there were 97.1 males. For every 100 females age 18 and over, there were 95.9 males.

The median household income was $30,107 and the median family income was $37,548. Males had a median income of $26,774 vand females $20,524. The per capita income was $17,098. About 6.3% of families and 9.8% of the population were below the poverty line, including 9.8% of those under age 18 and 13.2% of those age 65 or over.

== Education ==
=== Trion City School District ===
The Trion City School District holds grades pre-school to grade twelve, and consists of one elementary school, a middle school and a high school. The district has 79 full-time teachers and over 2,345 students.

- Trion Elementary School
- Trion Middle School
- Trion High School

== 2009 flood evacuation ==
On September 21, 2009, the "Frogtown" area of Trion and low-lying apartments in the town were evacuated when floodwaters overtopped a levee that protects the town. However, the levee never actually failed. Lamar Canada, Chattooga County public works director, described the flood as being "a grave situation for us - it's the first time it's happened in more than a decade".

== Notable people ==
- Rick Camp, Atlanta Braves pitcher 1976–1985
- Alvin Neelley, convicted murderer
- Stacy Searels, college football coach

== See also ==
- Mount Vernon Mill No. 3
- Riegeldale Tavern
