= Braves–Mets rivalry =

Major League Baseball rivalry

- Atlanta Braves New York Mets
- Location: Eastern United States
- First meeting: May 11, 1962; Polo Grounds, New York, New York; Braves 8, Mets 5
- Latest meeting: August 12, 2026; Truist Park, Cumberland, Georgia; Braves 6, Mets 3
- Next meeting: April 29, 2027; Truist Park, Cumberland, Georgia
- Stadiums: Braves: Truist Park; Mets: Citi Field

Statistics
- Total meetings: 968
- All-time series: Braves, 530–437–1 (.548)
- Regular season series: Braves, 526–433–1 (.548)
- Postseason results: Mets, 5–4 (.556)
- Largest victory: Braves, 20–2 (June 30, 2021); 21–3 (August 12, 2023); Mets, 20–6 (August 7, 1971)
- Longest win streak: Braves, 12 (June 20, 1962–April 15, 1963); Mets, 7 (June 3–August 16, 1979)
- Current win streak: Braves, 2

Post-season history
- 1969 NL Championship Series: Mets won, 3–0; 1999 NL Championship Series: Braves won, 4–2

Locations of the Atlanta Braves and New York Mets

The Braves–Mets rivalry is a rivalry between the Atlanta Braves and New York Mets. Both clubs are members of Major League Baseball's National League (NL) East division. The rivalry between the two clubs was particularly fierce during the late 1990s and early 2000s.

== Background ==
The Mets joined the NL in 1962 as an expansion team, before the leagues were split into divisions, and when the Braves were still in Milwaukee. Due to Major League Baseball wishing to keep the Cardinals and Cubs together in the same division when each league was split into divisions in 1969, Atlanta was forced to join the National League West and were led by Hank Aaron.

In 1966, pitching prospect Tom Seaver signed a contract with the Braves when they drafted him in the first round of the secondary June draft (20th overall). But the contract was voided by Baseball Commissioner William Eckert because Seaver's college team had played two exhibition games already that year, despite the fact that Seaver himself did not play in the games. Seaver intended, then, to finish the college season, but because he had signed a pro contract, the NCAA ruled him ineligible.

After Seaver's father complained to Eckert about the unfairness of the situation and threatened with a lawsuit, Eckert ruled that other teams could match the Braves' offer. The Mets were subsequently awarded his signing rights in a lottery drawing among the three teams (the Philadelphia Phillies and Cleveland Indians being the two others) that were willing to match the Braves' terms. Seaver went on to have a Hall of Fame career with the Mets, having his jersey retired by the organization.

=== 1969 NLCS ===
Seaver's impact was heavy as he led a staff that boasted excellent pitching, including then prospect Nolan Ryan in 1969. Perennial losers, the Mets came back to win the division and face off against the Braves in the NLCS. The "Miracle Mets" swept the Braves in the series, en route to their first World Series championship against the Baltimore Orioles in the 1969 World Series. The series against the Braves was the first playoff appearance and series win by an expansion team and their World Series win by extension was the first won by an expansion team.

Despite the early confrontation, the rivalry did not become especially heated until the 1990s, when division realignment put the Mets and Braves in the same division. During this time period, the Braves became one of the most dominant teams in professional baseball. The rivalry came to a visible head with the John Rocker controversy, where Atlanta pitcher Rocker made a number of derogatory comments about residents of New York City in 1999. This led to incidents of items such as full cups of beverages, and even batteries being thrown at Braves players, namely Rocker, when visiting the Mets. With the end of the Braves' fourteen-season National League East winning streak in 2006, when the Mets won their first division title since 1988, the rivalry hit a cooling period.

== Division realignment: rivalry established ==
The main cause of the rivalry was division realignment. With the Colorado Rockies and Florida Marlins entering play as expansion teams in the National League in 1993, MLB Commissioner Fay Vincent ordered realignment of the league, ordering the Braves and the Cincinnati Reds moved to the NL East, and the Chicago Cubs and rival St. Louis Cardinals to the NL West to rectify the geographical anomaly MLB created when realigning in 1969. However, the Mets and the Cubs voted against the plan.

Although Vincent's vision never really came into fruition, as he resigned shortly after announcing plans to realign the NL, MLB did in fact realign in 1994, albeit in the form of three divisions in each league, and the addition of an expanded playoff format. When agreeing on the realignment, the Pittsburgh Pirates switched to the newly created Central Division and gave up their spot in the NL East to the Braves.

The Braves had already established themselves as one of the dominant teams in baseball prior to realignment with appearances in two World Series prior to the move. The Mets had a reverse of fortune from their dominance in the late 1980s to one of the worst teams in baseball during the early 1990s.

=== 1995: Atlanta's first championship ===
In 1995, the Braves won the National League East by 21 games, and were the only team in the division to post a winning record. However, the Mets were the only team in the league to post a winning record against the eventual champions, posting an 8–5 record with a 5–1 mark at Shea Stadium, propelled by a sweep on the final weekend of the season, helping the Mets finish the season tied for second with the Philadelphia Phillies. (Mets won the head-to-head tie-breaker by winning the season series 7–6 against the Phillies.)

Just a year after realignment the Braves won their first championship in Atlanta by defeating the Cleveland Indians in the 1995 World Series. It was the franchise's first World Series victory in Atlanta and allowed the franchise to become the first ever to win a World Series in three different cities, having previously done so in Boston (1914) and Milwaukee (1957). The Braves' dominance over the National League would continue as they would go on to win the pennant again in 1996 behind the pitching of Greg Maddux, Tom Glavine, and John Smoltz.

=== 1996–2000: The rivalry intensifies ===
With the exception of 1996, when the Mets were near the bottom of the National League East, both franchises fielded contenders until deep into each season during this period. In 1997, the Mets overcame a shaky start to the season and were a wild card contender until the final week of the season. Ultimately, though, they finished third place in the NL East and thirteen games back of Atlanta. From 1998 to 2000, the Mets finished second in the standings to the Braves, eighteen, six and a half, and one game behind in those respective seasons. With the St. Louis Cardinals sweeping the Braves in the 2000 NLDS, it made the Mets run to their first World Series appearance since their championship season of 1986 much easier. The Braves had eliminated the Mets from wild-card contention on the final day of the 1998 season and in six games in the 1999 NLCS.

== 1999 NLCS ==
The NLCS was along the backdrop of Atlanta power hitter Chipper Jones cementing his MVP award that year by crushing Mets pitching for 4 home runs in three games, and 5 walks in the last days of the regular season. The Braves swept the series and moved 4 games ahead of the Mets with 9 games to play to their eventual division crown. Thinking that the Braves had eliminated the Mets from playoff contention as they had the year before, Chipper Jones infamously remarked: "Now all the Mets fans can go home and put their Yankee stuff on." Despite the setback, the Mets made the playoffs for the first time since 1988. Both had moved forward in the NLDS to see each other for the first time in post-season history since division realignment and since their initial post-season meeting during the 1969 NLCS and the "Miracle Mets."

The Braves took an early series lead of 3 games to 0 and looked poised to sweep the Mets out of the playoffs. However, the Mets rallied late in Game 4 off Braves' closer and perpetual Mets' nemesis John Rocker to win Game 4. The drama of the series was intensified in Game 5 when Robin Ventura hit a walk-off Grand Slam Single to win the game. The Grand Slam Single was ranked the third Greatest Moment in Mets history, behind only the team's two World Series Championships, which included Game 6 in 1986.

The Braves, however, would go on to win the series from the Mets in six games to win their 5th National League pennant of the decade. At the end of the 1999 NLCS, Joe Morgan closed out his NBC telecast by saying, "It was closing night for the greatest Mets show since (their championship season of) 1986." Despite their hard-fought win against the Mets, the Braves would go on to get swept by the Mets' cross-town rivals, the New York Yankees, who had beaten their biggest nemesis, Boston Red Sox, in the ALCS, in the 1999 World Series. With the exception of Game 1, all the games were decided by 1 run. Game 1 was decided by 2 runs.

== 2000 ==
=== John Rocker controversy ===
For a story published in the January 2000 issue of Sports Illustrated, Braves' closer John Rocker made a number of allegations stemming from his experiences in New York City and answering a question about whether he would ever play for either the Mets or the Yankees. Rocker's response was racist, homophobic, and sexist:

I'd retire first. It's the most hectic, nerve-racking city. Imagine having to take the 7 Train to the ballpark looking like you're riding through Beirut next to some kid with purple hair, next to some queer with AIDS, right next to some dude who just got out of jail for the fourth time, right next to some 20-year-old mom with four kids. It's depressing... The biggest thing I don't like about New York are the foreigners. You can walk an entire block in Times Square and not hear anybody speaking English. Asians and Koreans and Vietnamese and Indians and Russians and Spanish people and everything up there. How the hell did they get in this country?

During the interview, he also spoke of his opinion of the Mets and their fans:

Nowhere else in the country do people spit at you, throw bottles at you, throw quarters at you, throw batteries at you and say, 'Hey, I did your mother last night — she's a whore.' I talked about what degenerates they were and they proved me right.

The interview was conducted while driving to a speaking engagement in Atlanta.

=== Mets win NL pennant ===
In June 2000, the Mets achieved a 10-run comeback, In 2000, both the Mets and the Braves defeated each other at Shea Stadium to clinch playoff spots in successive days. First, the Braves won the NL East, defeating the Mets. The next day, the Mets beat the Braves to win the wild card, eliminating the Los Angeles Dodgers.

While both the Mets and the Braves were favorites to face each other in the National League Championship Series for a second straight year, the Braves ended up losing to the Cardinals in the 2000 NLDS. On October 7 during game 3 of NLDS at Shea Stadium, Met fans cheered as the scoreboard showed the Braves loss and elimination at the hands of the Cardinals. This assured Met fans their biggest and toughest rival would not impede their playoff run that year.

The Mets easily defeated the Giants to move on to the 2000 National League Championship Series, where they defeated the Cardinals to move on to the World Series. In defeating the Cardinals, the Mets clinched their first pennant since winning the 1986 World Series. The Mets would go on to lose the 2000 World Series to the Yankees in the first post-season Subway Series since the 1956 World Series.

== 2001 to 2021: the rivalry cools ==
Twice during the 2001 season, the rivalry saw peace. The Mets opened the 2001 season playing the Braves at Turner Field. When the Mets walked into their clubhouse prior to their workout before opening day, officials at the stadium greeted them by writing on the clubhouse message board: "Welcome to the National League champion New York Mets." A week later, the Mets hosted the Braves at Shea Stadium when they raised their 2000 National League Champions banner.

During pre-game festivities on September 21, 2001 at Shea Stadium, both the Braves and Mets paused to remember the victims of the terrorist attacks in New York and Washington ten days before. This was the first professional sporting event held in New York since the attacks. With the Mets down 2–1 in the bottom of the eighth inning, Piazza hit a two-run home run to help the Mets win. The significance of his spirit-lifting home run has been cited as one of the greatest moments in Major League Baseball history.

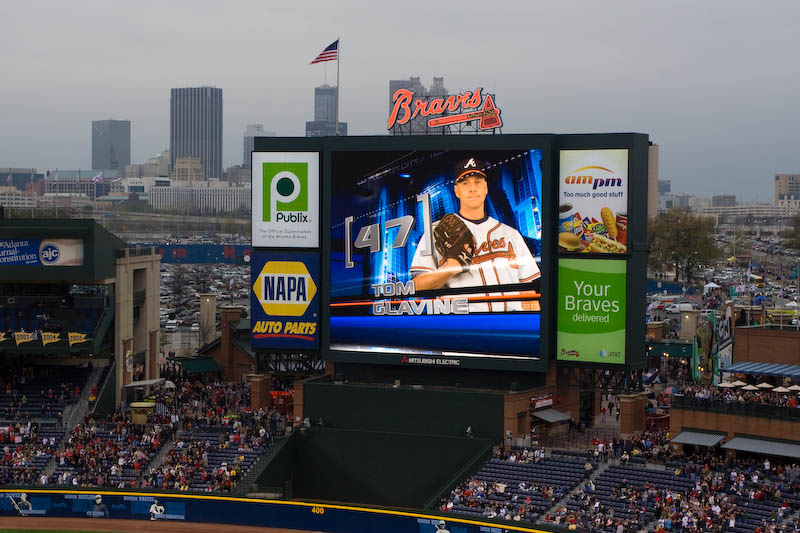
Glavine being introduced at Turner Field in his first game back with the Braves in 2008 after a 4-year stint with the Mets

In 2003, the Mets signed legendary Braves pitcher Tom Glavine for four years, $42.5 million. Glavine had poor success in his first year with the team but did help the Mets reach the 2006 NLCS where they lost to the St. Louis Cardinals in 7 games.

Towards the end of his tenure with the Mets, Glavine started to make grumblings about signing with them and not staying in Atlanta. In his final appearance as a Met on the last day of the season, with a postseason appearance on the line, Glavine gave up 7 runs in the first inning of a loss to the Florida Marlins. The loss caused the Mets to lose the division to the Philadelphia Phillies, missing the playoffs despite being in first place by 7 games as late as September. Some Mets fans believe Glavine threw the game to hurt the Mets, and that his true loyalty lied with the Braves.

Glavine left the Mets following that season and went back to the Braves. The Braves collapsed in a similar way in 2011, for the National League Wild Card, blowing a 8 1/2 lead for the National League Wild Card in September and losing the wild card by one game to the eventual champion St. Louis Cardinals. The Mets took two out of three in a late September series at Turner Field to contribute to the collapse.

In 2004, Chipper Jones named his child "Shea" after the Mets' home Shea Stadium, citing his great success and memories of playing there.

For opening day on April 3, 2017, the Mets and Braves played against one-another at Citi Field. Prior to that, the Braves had won six straight games at Citi Field. On April 5, 2017, Mets veteran RHP Bartolo Colón made his Braves appearance at Citi Field, stating he was "very happy and excited to go back there and get the opportunity to play against my ex-teammates."

== 2022: 101 wins ==
In 2022, both the Braves and Mets made the 2022 postseason with 101 wins. However, the National League East title and first-round bye was decided in a crucial three-game series at Truist Park from September 30 to October 2. The Mets entered the series with a 98–58 record, a game ahead of the Braves (97–59), and leading the season series 9–7. While the Mets had led the NL East for most of the season, the Braves closed the gap in the division race, thanks to a 14-game winning streak in June and a 74–32 stretch during the final three months.

In the end, Atlanta swept the three-game series in which the Mets' top starters Jacob deGrom, Max Scherzer, and Chris Bassitt combined to allow 11 earned runs. This allowed the Braves to win the season series 10–9, claiming the NL East division title and first-round bye while New York finished as the top wild card team.

However, neither team advanced beyond their first series they played in, with the Braves losing to the Philadelphia Phillies in the 2022 NLDS, and the Mets losing to the San Diego Padres in the Wild Card series, the latter becoming the first 100+ win team to fail to reach the Division Series since it was put into effect in 1995.

== 2024: 89 wins ==
Despite the Mets being six games out of a playoff spot on May 29 with a 22–33 record, compared to the Braves' record of 31–22 on the same day, the two teams quickly found themselves in a wild card race. The Mets briefly surpassed the Braves on July 26 following an 8–4 win against them, but the Braves shut out the Mets the next game to retake the lead in the standings.

As the Padres and Diamondbacks began surging in late July and August, the race for the third wild card spot seemingly came down to the Mets and Braves. However, the Mets began to lose ground on the Braves, and by August 28, the Braves established a four game lead on the Mets with only 29 games remaining. However, following a long win streak, the Mets re-tied the Braves on September 6.

Heading into the final series at Truist Park, the Mets were able to take a two game lead over the Braves. However, a loss by the Mets to the Braves on September 24 moved the Braves to just one spot behind the Mets. The remaining two games were postponed to a September 30 doubleheader due to impacts from Hurricane Helene. Heading into the doubleheader, the Mets and Braves both found themselves with identical 88–72 records, with both needing one win to clinch a postseason spot; a sweep from either team would eliminate the loser and send the Diamondbacks into the playoffs instead.

The first game of the doubleheader became an instant classic, with the Mets overcoming a three-run deficit heading into the eighth inning by scoring six runs in the top of the eighth, only to blow that lead in the bottom of the eighth and fall behind 7–6. However, a go-ahead two-run home run from Francisco Lindor in the ninth inning propelled the Mets to an 8–7 victory, clinching a playoff spot. The Braves won the second game 3–0 to clinch a postseason spot as well.

The Braves earned the #5 seed by virtue of winning the season series 7–6, giving the Mets the #6 seed. Due to both teams clinching, both clubhouses held champagne celebrations and congratulated each other despite the rivalry.

== Season-by-season results ==
Braves vs. Mets Season-by-Season Results
1960s (Braves, 89–52–1)

Season	Season series		at Milwaukee/Atlanta Braves	at New York Mets	Overall series	Notes
1962	Braves	12‍–‍6	Braves, 6‍–‍3	Braves, 6‍–‍3	Braves; 12‍–‍6	The Braves take a 7–6 lead on July 24 in the series, a lead they would never relinquish.
1963	Braves	12‍–‍6	Braves, 8‍–‍1	Mets, 5‍–‍4	Braves; 24‍–‍12	
1964	Braves	14‍–‍4	Braves, 8‍–‍1	Braves, 6‍–‍3	Braves; 38‍–‍16	
1965	Braves	13‍–‍5	Braves, 9‍–‍0	Mets, 5‍–‍4	Braves; 51‍–‍21	
1966	Braves	14‍–‍4	Braves, 7‍–‍2	Braves, 7‍–‍2	Braves; 65‍–‍25	The Braves move from Milwaukee to Atlanta
1967	Mets	10‍–‍8	Braves, 6‍–‍3	Mets, 7‍–‍2	Braves; 73‍–‍35	
1968	Braves	12‍–‍6‍–‍1	Braves, 5‍–‍4	Braves, 7‍–‍2‍–‍1	Braves; 85‍–‍41‍–‍1	
1969	Mets	8‍–‍4	Mets, 4‍–‍2	Mets, 4‍–‍2	Braves; 89‍–‍49‍–‍1	MLB's expansion and realignment placed the Braves in the NL West and the Mets in the NL East. The new division alignment shortens meetings from 18 to 12 games. The Mets win 1969 World Series
1969 NLCS	Mets	3‍–‍0	Mets, 2‍–‍0	Mets, 1‍–‍0	Braves; 89‍–‍52‍–‍1	First meeting in the postseason. Mets sweep in three games. Mets proceed to win World Series.

1970s (Mets, 61–59)

Season	Season series		at Atlanta Braves	at New York Mets	Overall series	Notes
1970	Tie	6‍–‍6	Braves, 4‍–‍2	Mets, 4‍–‍2	Braves; 95‍–‍58‍–‍1	
1971	Braves	7‍–‍5	Braves, 4‍–‍2	Tie, 3‍–‍3	Braves; 102‍–‍63‍–‍1	
1972	Braves	7‍–‍5	Braves, 4‍–‍2	Tie, 3‍–‍3	Braves; 109‍–‍68‍–‍1	
1973	Tie	6‍–‍6	Mets, 4‍–‍2	Braves, 4‍–‍2	Braves; 115‍–‍74‍–‍1	Mets lose 1973 World Series
1974	Braves	8‍–‍4	Braves, 5‍–‍1	Tie, 3‍–‍3	Braves; 123‍–‍78‍–‍1	
1975	Mets	8‍–‍4	Mets, 5‍–‍1	Tie, 3‍–‍3	Braves; 127‍–‍86‍–‍1	
1976	Mets	8‍–‍4	Tie, 3‍–‍3	Mets, 5‍–‍1	Braves; 131‍–‍94‍–‍1	
1977	Braves	7‍–‍5	Braves, 4‍–‍2	Tie, 3‍–‍3	Braves; 138‍–‍99‍–‍1	
1978	Tie	6‍–‍6	Mets, 4‍–‍2	Braves, 4‍–‍2	Braves; 144‍–‍105‍–‍1	
1979	Mets	8‍–‍4	Mets, 5‍–‍1	Tie, 3‍–‍3	Braves; 148‍–‍113‍–‍1	

1980s (Mets, 68–46)

Season	Season series		at Atlanta Braves	at New York Mets	Overall series	Notes
1980	Mets	9‍–‍3	Mets, 4‍–‍2	Mets, 5‍–‍1	Braves; 151‍–‍122‍–‍1	
1981	Tie	3‍–‍3	Braves, 2‍–‍1	Mets, 2‍–‍1	Braves; 154‍–‍125‍–‍1	Strike-shortened season
1982	Braves	9‍–‍3	Braves, 4‍–‍2	Braves, 5‍–‍1	Braves; 163‍–‍128‍–‍1	
1983	Braves	8‍–‍4	Braves, 5‍–‍1	Tie, 3‍–‍3	Braves; 171‍–‍132‍–‍1	
1984	Mets	8‍–‍4	Mets, 5‍–‍1	Tie, 3‍–‍3	Braves; 175‍–‍140‍–‍1	
1985	Mets	10‍–‍2	Mets, 5‍–‍1	Mets, 5‍–‍1	Braves; 177‍–‍150‍–‍1	
1986	Mets	8‍–‍4	Tie, 3‍–‍3	Mets, 5‍–‍1	Braves; 181‍–‍158‍–‍1	Mets win 1986 World Series
1987	Braves	7‍–‍5	Braves, 4‍–‍2	Tie, 3‍–‍3	Braves; 188‍–‍163‍–‍1	
1988	Mets	8‍–‍4	Mets, 5‍–‍1	Tie, 3‍–‍3	Braves; 192‍–‍171‍–‍1	
1989	Mets	10‍–‍2	Mets, 4‍–‍2	Mets, 6‍–‍0	Braves; 194‍–‍181‍–‍1	

1990s (Braves, 73–52)

Season	Season series		at Atlanta Braves	at New York Mets	Overall series	Notes
1990	Mets	8‍–‍4	Tie, 3‍–‍3	Mets, 5‍–‍1	Braves; 198‍–‍189‍–‍1	
1991	Braves	9‍–‍3	Braves, 4‍–‍2	Braves, 5‍–‍1	Braves; 207‍–‍192‍–‍1	Braves lose 1991 World Series
1992	Braves	7‍–‍5	Mets, 4‍–‍2	Braves, 5‍–‍1	Braves; 214‍–‍197‍–‍1	Braves lose 1992 World Series
1993	Braves	9‍–‍3	Braves, 4‍–‍2	Braves, 5‍–‍1	Braves; 223‍–‍200‍–‍1	
1994	Braves	5‍–‍4	Braves, 2‍–‍1	Tie, 3‍–‍3	Braves; 228‍–‍204‍–‍1	MLB realignment places Braves into NL East with Mets. Strike-shortened season. Strike cancels postseason. MLB adds Wild Card, allowing for both teams to make the postseason in the same year.
1995	Mets	8‍–‍5	Braves, 4‍–‍3	Mets, 5‍–‍1	Braves; 233‍–‍212‍–‍1	1994 realignment increases meetings from 12 to 13 meetings per year. Braves win 1995 World Series
1996	Braves	7‍–‍6	Braves, 7‍–‍6	Mets, 4‍–‍3	Braves; 240‍–‍218‍–‍1	Braves lose 1996 World Series
1997	Mets	7‍–‍5	Tie, 3‍–‍3	Mets, 4‍–‍2	Braves; 245‍–‍225‍–‍1	Introduction of interleague play decreases meetings from 13 to 12.
1998	Braves	9‍–‍3	Braves, 6‍–‍0	Tie, 3‍–‍3	Braves; 254‍–‍228‍–‍1	MLB changed to an unbalanced schedule in 1998 due to MLB's expansion and realignment, resulting in 12–13 meetings per year.
1999	Braves	9‍–‍3	Braves, 5‍–‍1	Braves, 4‍–‍2	Braves; 263‍–‍231‍–‍1	Braves lose 1999 World Series
1999 NLCS	Braves	4‍–‍2	Braves, 3‍–‍0	Mets, 2‍–‍1	Braves; 267‍–‍233‍–‍1	Second meeting in the postseason. Braves proceed to lose World Series

2000s (Braves, 105–75)

Season	Season series		at Atlanta Braves	at New York Mets	Overall series	Notes
2000	Braves	7‍–‍6	Braves, 4‍–‍2	Mets, 4‍–‍3	Braves; 274‍–‍239‍–‍1	Mets lose 2000 World Series
2001	Braves	10‍–‍9	Tie, 5‍–‍5	Braves, 5‍–‍4	Braves; 284‍–‍248‍–‍1	MLB changed to an unbalanced schedule in 2001, resulting in 18–19 meetings per year
2002	Braves	12‍–‍7	Braves, 6‍–‍3	Braves, 6‍–‍4	Braves; 296‍–‍255‍–‍1	
2003	Braves	11‍–‍8	Braves, 7‍–‍3	Mets, 5‍–‍4	Braves; 307‍–‍263‍–‍1	
2004	Braves	12‍–‍7	Braves, 7‍–‍2	Tie, 5‍–‍5	Braves; 319‍–‍270‍–‍1	
2005	Braves	13‍–‍6	Braves, 8‍–‍1	Tie, 5‍–‍5	Braves; 332‍–‍276‍–‍1	
2006	Mets	11‍–‍7	Mets, 6‍–‍3	Mets, 5‍–‍4	Braves; 339‍–‍287‍–‍1	
2007	Tie	9‍–‍9	Mets, 5‍–‍4	Braves, 5‍–‍4	Braves; 348‍–‍296‍–‍1	
2008	Braves	11‍–‍7	Braves, 8‍–‍1	Mets, 6‍–‍3	Braves; 359‍–‍303‍–‍1	
2009	Braves	13‍–‍5	Braves, 6‍–‍3	Braves, 7‍–‍2	Braves; 372‍–‍308‍–‍1	

2010s (Braves, 100–87)

Season	Season series		at Atlanta Braves	at New York Mets	Overall series	Notes
2010	Braves	11‍–‍7	Braves, 6‍–‍3	Braves, 5‍–‍4	Braves; 383‍–‍315‍–‍1	
2011	Tie	9‍–‍9	Mets, 5‍–‍4	Braves, 5‍–‍4	Braves; 392‍–‍324‍–‍1	
2012	Braves	12‍–‍6	Braves, 7‍–‍2	Braves, 5‍–‍4	Braves; 404‍–‍330‍–‍1	
2013	Braves	10‍–‍9	Tie, 5‍–‍5	Braves, 5‍–‍4	Braves; 414‍–‍339‍–‍1	Both AL and NL having balanced teams leads to a balanced schedule of 19 games per season.
2014	Mets	10‍–‍9	Mets, 5‍–‍4	Tie, 5‍–‍5	Braves; 423‍–‍349‍–‍1	
2015	Mets	11‍–‍8	Tie, 5‍–‍5	Mets, 6‍–‍3	Braves; 431‍–‍360‍–‍1	Mets lose 2015 World Series
2016	Braves	10‍–‍9	Mets, 7‍–‍3	Braves, 7‍–‍2	Braves; 441‍–‍369‍–‍1	
2017	Mets	12‍–‍7	Mets, 7‍–‍3	Mets, 5‍–‍4	Braves; 448‍–‍381‍–‍1	
2018	Braves	13‍–‍6	Braves, 6‍–‍3	Braves, 7‍–‍3	Braves; 461‍–‍387‍–‍1	
2019	Braves	11‍–‍8	Braves, 6‍–‍4	Braves, 5‍–‍4	Braves; 472‍–‍395‍–‍1	

2020s (Braves, 58–42)

Season	Season series		at Atlanta Braves	at New York Mets	Overall series	Notes
2020	Braves	7‍–‍3	Braves, 3‍–‍1	Braves, 4‍–‍2	Braves; 479‍–‍398‍–‍1	Season shortened to 60 games (with 10 meetings) due to COVID-19 pandemic.
2021	Braves	10‍–‍9	Braves, 5‍–‍4	Tie, 5‍–‍5	Braves; 489‍–‍407‍–‍1	Braves win 2021 World Series
2022	Braves	10‍–‍9	Braves, 7‍–‍3	Mets, 6‍–‍3	Braves; 499‍–‍416‍–‍1	Braves win NL East tiebreaker by winning the season series 10–9, by sweeping Mets in final series of the season.
2023	Braves	10‍–‍3	Braves, 5‍–‍1	Braves, 5‍–‍2	Braves; 509‍–‍419‍–‍1	New schedule structure started this season to allow every team to play one series against every interleague team. Shortening meetings from 19 to 13 games.
2024	Braves	7‍–‍6	Tie, 3‍–‍3	Braves, 4‍–‍3	Braves; 516‍–‍425‍–‍1	
2025	Braves	8‍–‍5	Braves, 4‍–‍2	Braves, 4‍–‍3	Braves; 524‍–‍430‍–‍1	
2026	Mets	7‍–‍6	Braves, 4‍–‍3	Mets, 4‍–‍2	Braves; 530‍–‍437‍–‍1	

Summary of Results

Season	Season series		at Atlanta Braves	at New York Mets	Notes
Milwaukee Braves vs New York Mets	Braves	51‍–‍21	Braves, 31‍–‍5	Braves, 20‍–‍16	
Atlanta Braves vs New York Mets	Braves	475‍–‍410‍–‍1	Braves, 252‍–‍188	Tie, 223‍–‍223‍–‍1	
Overall Regular season games	Braves	526‍–‍432‍–‍1	Braves, 283‍–‍193	Braves, 243‍–‍239‍–‍1	
Postseason games	Mets	5‍–‍4	Braves, 3‍–‍2	Mets, 3‍–‍1	
Postseason series	Tie	1‍–‍1	Tie, 1‍–‍1	Mets, 2‍–‍0	NLCS: 1969, 1999
Overall Regular Season and Postseason	Braves	530‍–‍437‍–‍1	Braves, 286‍–‍195	Braves, 244‍–‍242‍–‍1	

== Notable players that played for both teams ==
A total of 159 players have played for both franchises.

Name	Position(s)	Braves tenure	Mets tenure
Warren Spahn	Pitcher	1942, 1946–1964	1965
Joe Torre	Catcher / First baseman / Third baseman	1960–1968	1975–1977
Tom Glavine	Pitcher	1987–2002, 2008	2003–2007
Octavio Dotel	Pitcher	2007	1999
Bobby Bonilla	Third baseman / Right fielder	2000	1992–1995, 1999
Gary Sheffield	Outfielder / Third baseman	2002–2003	2009
Kelly Johnson	Second baseman	2005, 2007–2009, 2015–2016	2015–2016
Billy Wagner	Pitcher	2010	2006–2009
Liván Hernández	Pitcher	2012	2009
A. J. Minter	Pitcher	2017–2024	2025–2026
José Bautista	Right fielder / Third baseman	2018	2018
Robinson Canó	Second baseman	2022	2019–2020, 2022
Travis d'Arnaud	Catcher	2020–2024	2013–2019
Bartolo Colón	Pitcher	2017	2014–2016

== See also ==
- Major League Baseball rivalries
