= Riegeldale Tavern =

Restaurant in Georgia, United States

Coordinates: 34.53653°N 85.30842°W

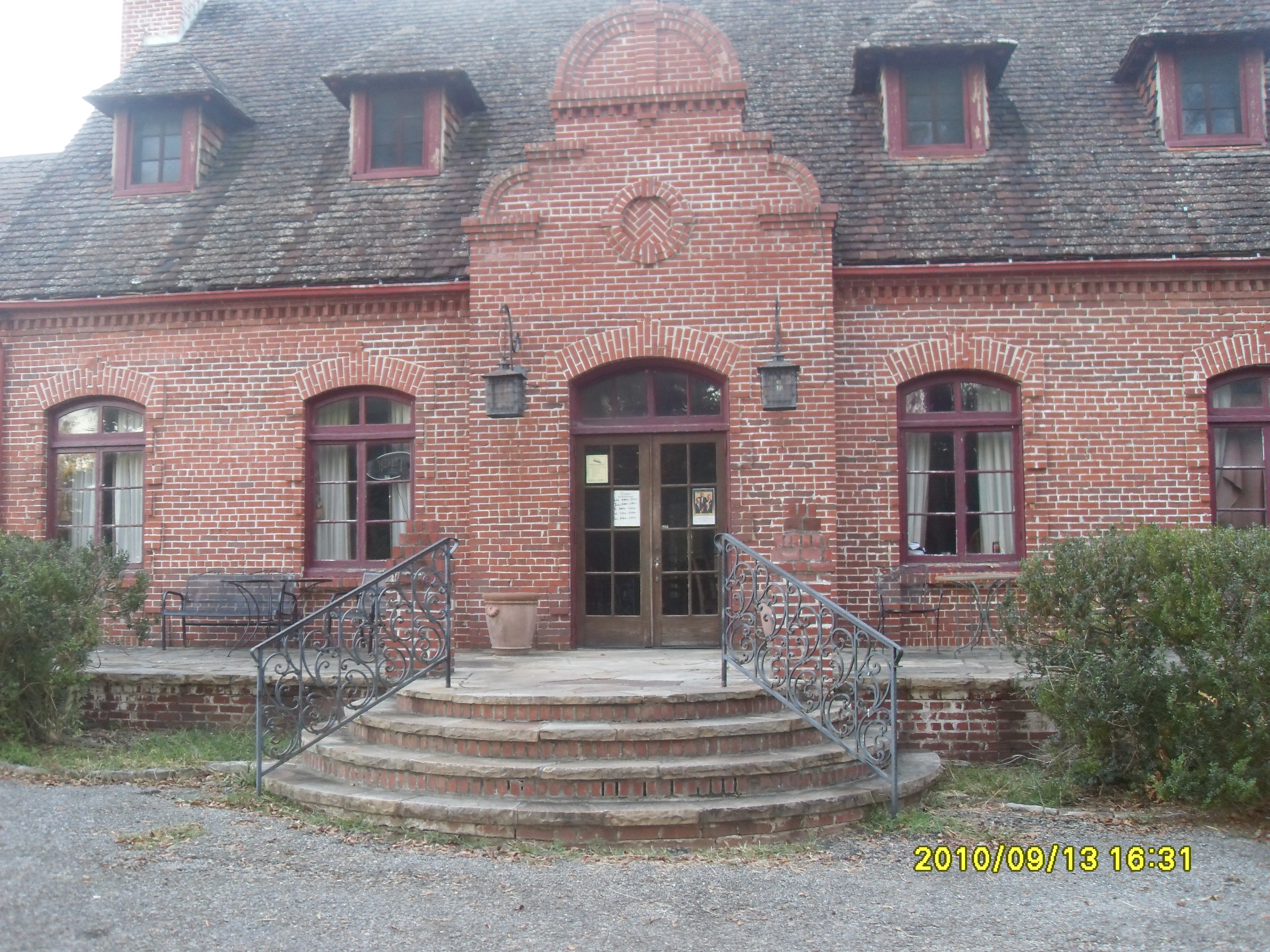
The Riegeldale Tavern

Riegeldale Tavern is a restaurant located in Trion on Old Highway 27 in Northwest Georgia, United States. It is surrounded by the Appalachian Mountains along with the Chattooga River.

== History ==
In 1912, Benjamin D. Riegel, owner of the Trion mill, came up with the idea of the tavern. He wanted a place where traveling tourists coming through the area could have an eating place. His wife also wanted a place where friends and guests could mingle with one another. Riegel talked to his son-in-law, Clarence Jones (an architect), about building a place to sell their products and at the same time, an eating place for guests and tourists. The building itself was constructed in 1936 within six weeks, with the gardens being completed in the spring of 1937.

== Design ==
Jones visited Europe and several other countries for the design of the tavern. The architecture consisted of four dormer windows on each side with sloping roofs that had gabled ends. The back porch was made of sandstone. On the outside, there was a lamppost near the entrance at the driveway.

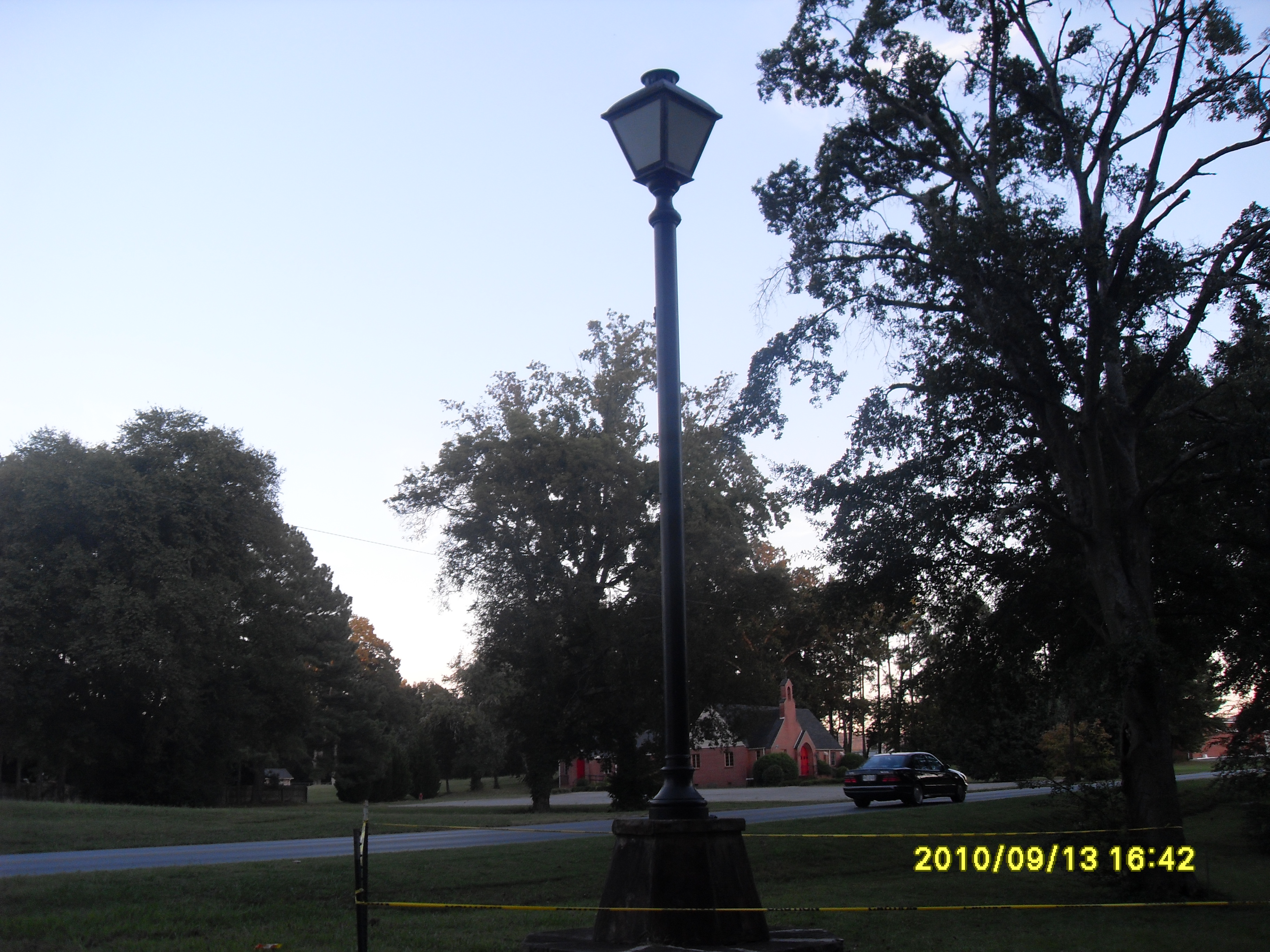
The lamppost outside the tavern

== Food ==
The tavern's food has won several awards. One of the awards is Who’s Who in Ford Times published by the Ford Motor Company in the mid-1900s. The most delicate meal served was The Ole Tavern Baked Eggplant. Duncan Hines, a restaurant-reviewer, wrote a paragraph on the tavern in the 1959 edition of his Adventures in Good Eating travel-guide. He wrote that they had "sizzling steaks, homemade bread, waffles and country ham."
