= Trion City School District =

School district in Georgia (U.S. state)

Address
- 239 Simmons Street Trion, Georgia, 30753-1237; United States
- Coordinates: 34.537971°N 85.311822°W

District information
- Grades: Pre-school through 12
- Superintendent: Dr. Phil Williams
- Accreditations: Southern Association of Colleges and Schools; Georgia Accrediting Commission

Students and staff
- Enrollment: 1,345
- Faculty: 79

Other information
- Telephone: (706) 734-2363
- Website: www.trionschools.org

The Trion City School District is a public school system located in Trion, Georgia. In February 1990, it fell victim to a devastating flood. This was considered the worst disaster Trion has experienced. In 1996, the Pre-K, Elementary and High Schools were combined and relocated to 919 Allgood Street. It now serves students from Pre-K through twelfth grades. The school system accepts students living in Trion and surrounding counties. As of 2008, Trion City Schools served 1,266 students.

== Schools ==
The Trion City School District has one elementary school, one middle school, and one high school.

=== Elementary school ===
- Trion Elementary School

=== Middle school ===
- Trion Middle School

=== High school ===
- Trion High School

== Academics ==
The Trion School system has received many awards and recognition for its outstanding academic achievements. State School Superintendent Kathy Cox named Trion a School of Excellence. Trion High School ranked 17th in the state for SAT scores in 2007-2008. In 2009, it was one of 7 schools in Georgia and one of 250 schools in the country to be named a National Blue Ribbon School. Trion has also received a Great Schools Rating of 10 out of 10 based on test results from all Georgia schools.

== Athletics ==
When Trion began, its school colors were purple and gold and its mascot was a goat. The colors were later changed to blue and white, and the mascot is now a bulldog.

Trion offers a wide variety of athletic choices, including football, baseball, basketball, cheerleading, golf, soccer, softball, tennis, and wrestling.

The Bulldogs earned state championships in football in 1957, 1973, and 1974, along with twelve Region 6A championships. Trion has bred several wrestling state champions also. The Trion cheerleaders have won two consecutive state championships. Trion can also be credited with baseball state championship wins in 1973 and 1983.

== Notable alumni ==
- Rick Camp - played for the Atlanta Braves (1976-1985); participated in the longest baseball game recorded to date in the major leagues (July 4–5, 1985 vs NY Mets)
- Dan Logan - played for the Baltimore Orioles; participated in the longest baseball game recorded for the minor league
- Stacy Searles - offensive line coach for University of Texas; All-American at Auburn University

== Notes ==
- Nunn, Emmett T., "One Way To See It"
