= Grand slam (baseball) =

Term in baseball referring to the highest possible scoring play

Travis Bazzana hits a grand slam for the Lake County Captains on July 31, 2024.

In baseball, a grand slam is a home run hit with all three bases occupied by baserunners ("bases loaded"), thereby scoring four runs—the most possible in one play. According to The Dickson Baseball Dictionary, the term originated in the card game of contract bridge, in which a grand slam involves taking all the possible tricks. The word slam, by itself, usually is connected with a loud sound, particularly of a door being closed with excess force; thus, slamming the door on one's opponent(s), in addition to the bat slamming the ball into a home run.

== Highlights ==
=== Players ===
Roger Connor is believed to have been the first major league player to hit a grand slam, on September 10, 1881, for the Troy Trojans of the National League (NL) at Riverside Park in Greenbush, New York (now Rensselaer). Although Charlie Gould hit one for the Boston Red Stockings of the National Association (NA) in 1871, the NA is not recognized by Major League Baseball (MLB) as a major league.

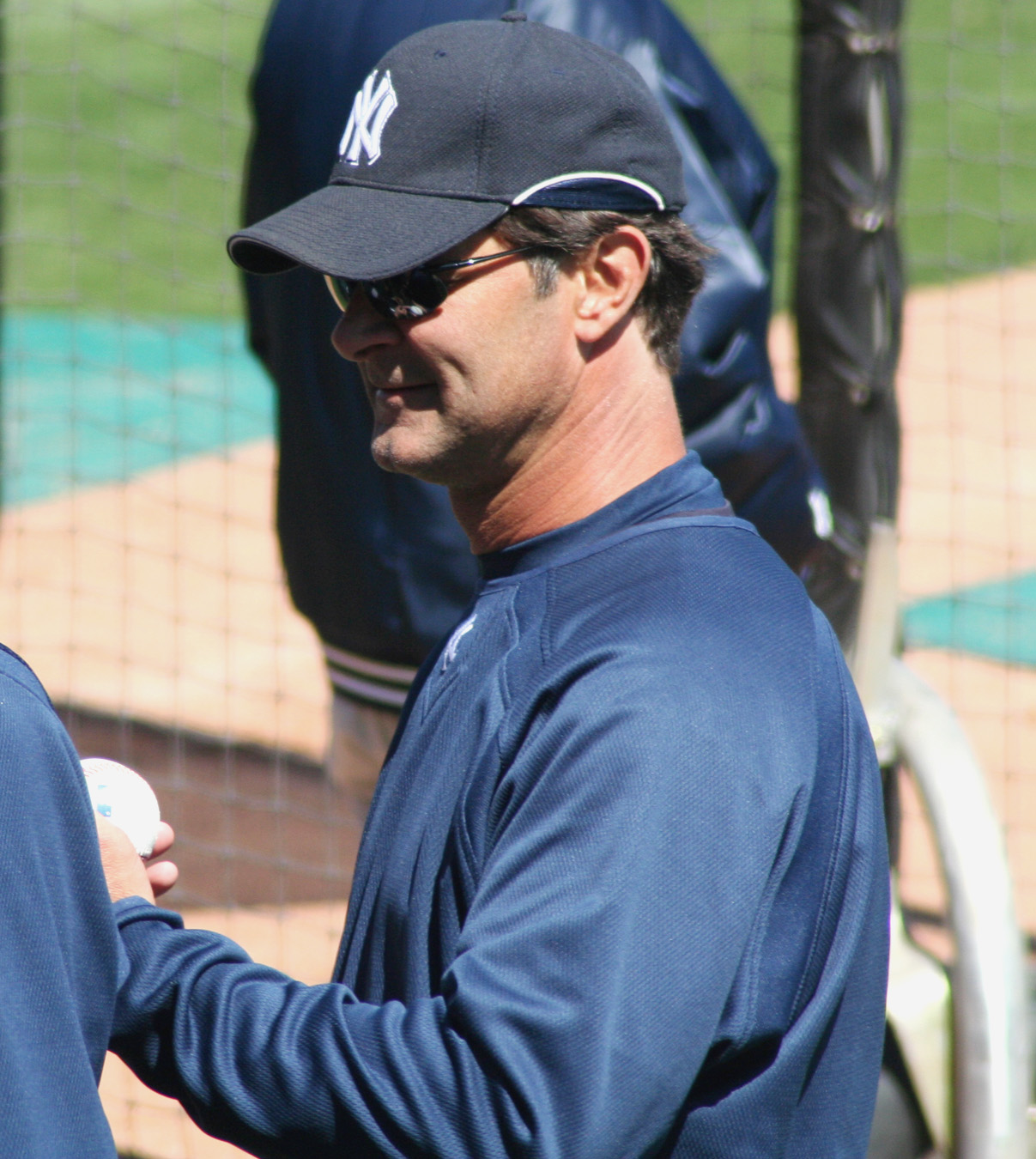
In 1987, Don Mattingly set the record for most grand slams in a single season, with six. These were the only grand slams of his career.

Alex Rodriguez has 25 career grand slams, the most by any player in MLB history. Don Mattingly (1987) and Travis Hafner (2006) share the single-season record with six grand slams each – in Mattingly's case, these were the only grand slams of his major league career. Ernie Banks (1955) and Albert Pujols (2009) share the single-season National League record with five grand slams each.

In 1968, Jim Northrup of the Detroit Tigers set a major league record by hitting three grand slams in a week, including two in consecutive at-bats of a game. This feat (three grand slams in one week) would later be matched by Larry Parrish of the Texas Rangers in 1982. However, Northrup hit his three slams in only 14 plate appearances, setting a record that still stands as of 2021.

Several grand slams, the first being Connor's in 1881, consisted of a player hitting a walk-off grand slam for a one-run victory; some baseball observers call this an "ultimate grand slam". Roberto Clemente is the only player to have hit a walk-off inside-the-park grand slam in a one-run victory; when the Pittsburgh Pirates defeated the Chicago Cubs 9–8 on July 25, 1956 at Forbes Field, a park known for its spacious outfield.

Four players hit a grand slam in their first Major League at-bat: Bill Duggleby (1898), Jeremy Hermida (2005), Kevin Kouzmanoff (2006), and Daniel Nava (2010). Kouzmanoff, Nava, and Duggleby hit theirs on the first pitch; Hermida's grand slam was in a pinch-hit at bat.

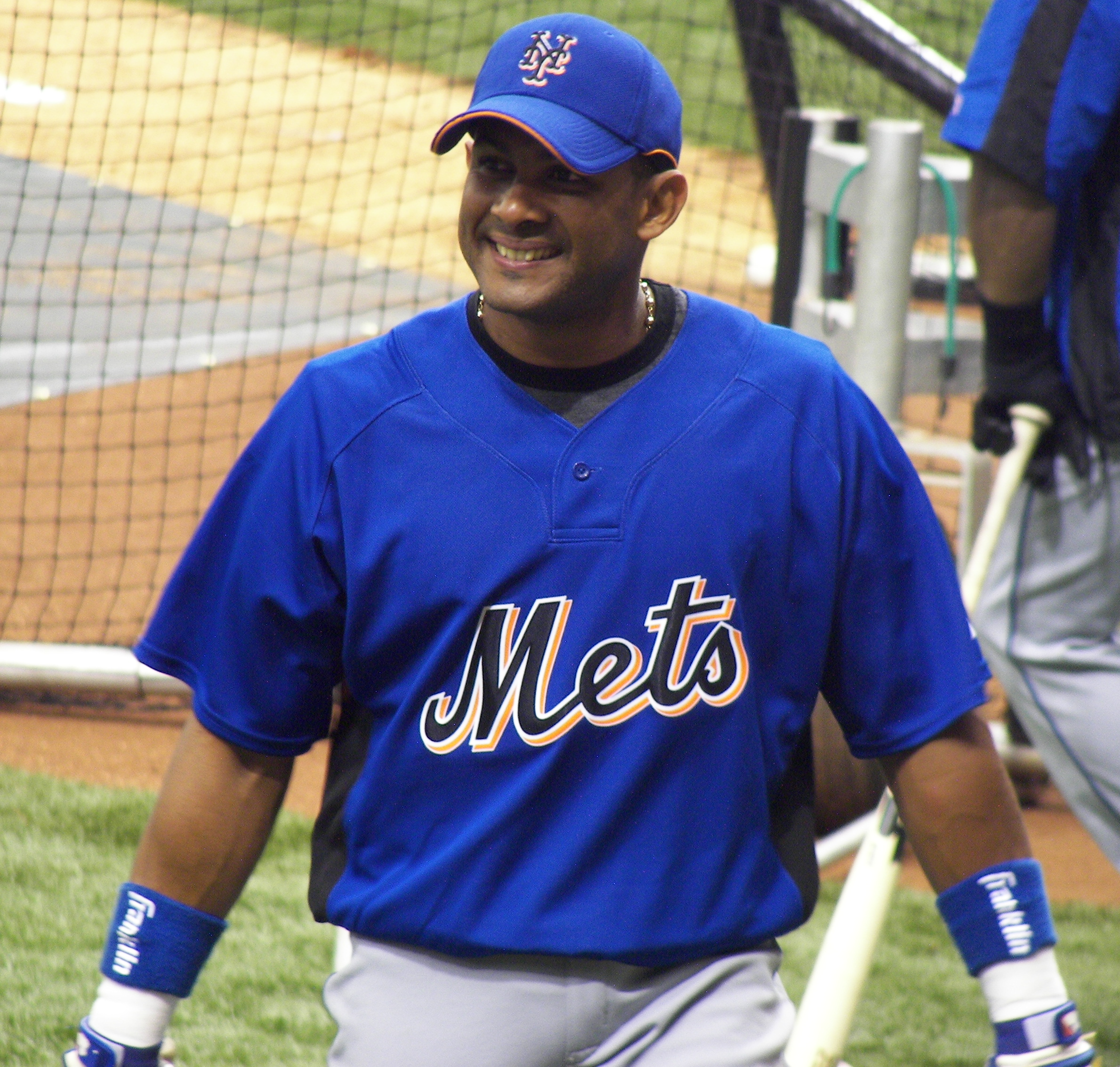
Fernando Tatís (pictured with the Mets) is the only player to hit two grand slams in the same inning, with the Cardinals, in 1999.

Tony Cloninger is the only pitcher to hit two grand slams in one game, for the Atlanta Braves in a 1966 contest against the San Francisco Giants.

Félix Hernández of the Seattle Mariners became the first American League pitcher since the designated hitter rule went into effect in 1973 to hit a grand slam when he did so on June 23, 2008, against the New York Mets in an interleague game.

The only major league player to hit two grand slams in one inning is Fernando Tatís of the St. Louis Cardinals, in 1999, both grand slams coming off Los Angeles Dodgers' pitcher Chan Ho Park in the third inning. Tatis was only the second National League player to hit two grand slams in one game, joining Cloninger. Park was only the second pitcher in major league history to give up two grand slams in one inning, joining Bill Phillips of the Pittsburgh Pirates, who did it in 1890, one to Tom Burns and one to Malachi Kittridge. Therefore, Park was the first to give up both to the same batter. Tatis had never hit a grand slam before in his career. Bill Mueller is the only player to hit grand slams from both sides of the plate in the same game, when he hit two in 2003 for the Boston Red Sox against the Texas Rangers. Robin Ventura is the only player to hit a grand slam in both games of a doubleheader, when he did so in 1999 for the New York Mets against the Milwaukee Brewers.

In Japan's professional league, the feat of multiple grand slams in a single inning by a team has been accomplished three times; most recently on April 1, 2007 by José Fernández and Takeshi Yamasaki of the Tohoku Rakuten Golden Eagles. The Fukuoka Daiei Hawks accomplished the feat in 1999.

=== Team ===
In 2006, the Chicago White Sox hit grand slams in three consecutive games against the Houston Astros (June 23–25). Scott Podsednik hit the only grand slam of his career in the series opener. Joe Crede followed up with a slam of his own on in the second game, and Tadahito Iguchi hit a game tying grand slam in the bottom of the ninth with two outs in the series finale. The White Sox became the first team to accomplish this since the Detroit Tigers in 1993. On the other hand, the 2007 Kansas City Royals surrendered grand slams in three straight games; two against the Baltimore Orioles (April 13–14) and one against the Tigers (April 16).

On August 25, 2011, the New York Yankees became the first team in MLB history to hit three grand slams in one game. Robinson Canó, Russell Martin and Curtis Granderson took Oakland Athletics pitchers Rich Harden, Fautino de los Santos, and Bruce Billings deep, with each grand slam being hit in a different inning. The Yankees would win the game 22–9.

On June 3, 2017, a record-breaking seven grand slams were hit on one day: One each for the Los Angeles Dodgers, Milwaukee Brewers, Atlanta Braves, Colorado Rockies, Chicago Cubs, Seattle Mariners, and the Los Angeles Angels of Anaheim whose Albert Pujols hit his 600th career home run.

On August 20, 2020, the San Diego Padres became the first team to hit a grand slam in four consecutive games when Fernando Tatis Jr, Wil Myers, Manny Machado, and Eric Hosmer each hit a grand slam in a series against the Texas Rangers.

On October 16, 2021, in Game 2 of the 2021 ALCS against the Houston Astros, the Boston Red Sox became the first team to hit two grand slams in one postseason game when J. D. Martinez hit one in the first inning and Rafael Devers hit one in the second. Two days later, in Game 3 of the series, Kyle Schwarber hit another slam for Boston to make the Red Sox the first team to hit three grand slams in one postseason series.

== Notable calls ==
"Get out the rye bread and the mustard, Grandma, it is grand salami time!"—used by longtime Seattle Mariners lead commentator Dave Niehaus from the 1995 season until his death in November 2010, now being used by Niehaus' longtime partner Rick Rizzs.

Various newspaper accounts show players used the term "grand salami" for a grand slam at least as early as 1966. "When Ernie Banks hits a grand slam he always calls it a 'grand salami,'" reported Jack Lang. "'In that way I always manage to get a nice big salami delivered to my home by the Hebrew National salami people,' Banks laughed."

== Career grand slam leaders ==
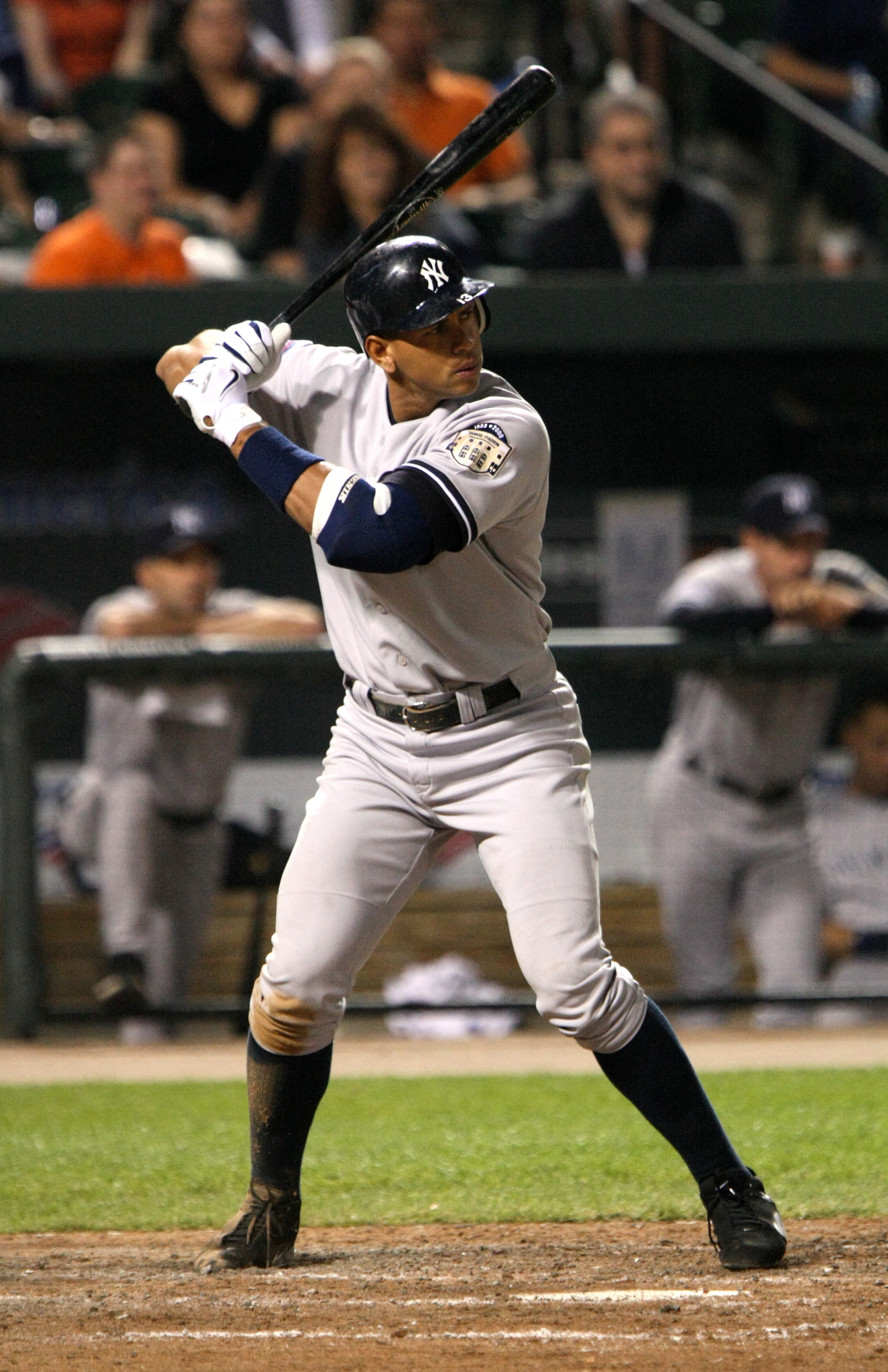
Alex Rodriguez currently holds the record for most career grand slams with 25.

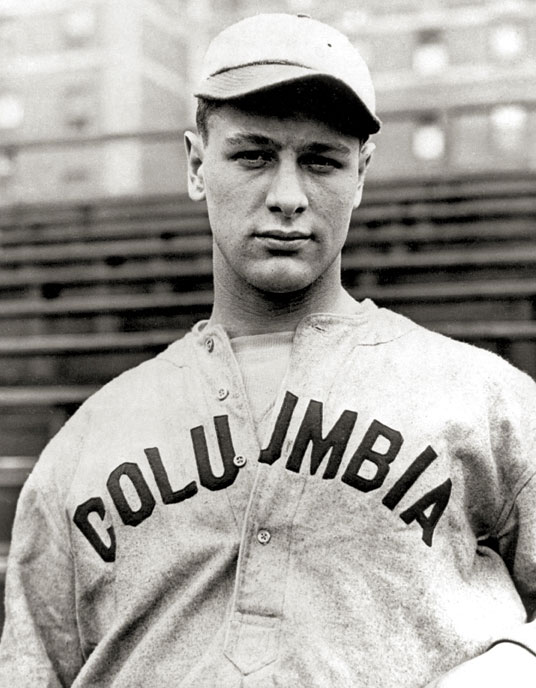
With 23 grand slams, Lou Gehrig held the all-time record until 2013.

Name	Total
Alex Rodriguez	25
Lou Gehrig	23
Manny Ramírez	21
Eddie Murray	19
Willie McCovey	18†
Robin Ventura	18
Jimmie Foxx	17
Carlos Lee	17
Ted Williams	17
Hank Aaron	16
Dave Kingman	16
Babe Ruth	16
Albert Pujols	16

† National League record

== Single-season grand slam leaders ==
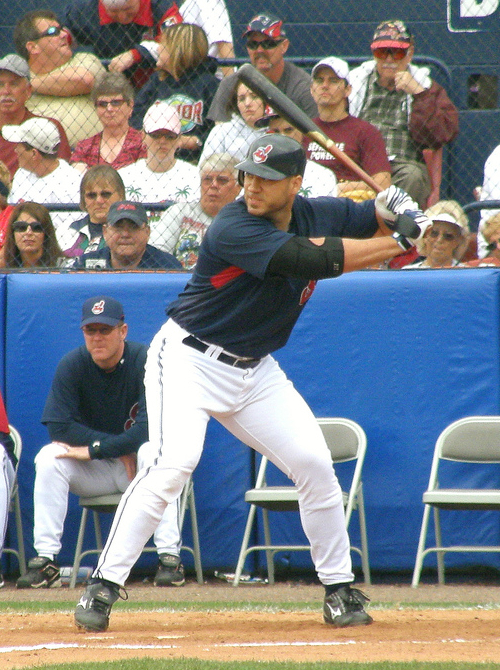
Travis Hafner matched Mattingly's single-season record in 2006.

Name	Total	Year	League
Don Mattingly	6	1987	AL
Travis Hafner	6	2006	AL
Ernie Banks	5	1955	NL
Jim Gentile	5	1961	AL
Albert Pujols	5	2009	NL
Richie Sexson	5	2006	AL
20 players	4	–	–

== World Series ==
Year	Game	Batter	Site	Pitcher	Inning	Score after HR	Final score	Series standing	Notes
1920	Game 5, October 10	Elmer Smith, Cleveland	League Park	Burleigh Grimes, Brooklyn	1st	4–0	8–1, W	3–2 CLE	The first slam in Series history, hit with none out in the 1st, is overshadowed when, in the 5th inning, Bill Wambsganss turns the only unassisted triple play ever in the Series.
1936	Game 2, October 2	Tony Lazzeri, New York (AL)	Polo Grounds	Dick Coffman, New York (NL)	3rd	9–1	18–4, W	1–1	With President Roosevelt in attendance, Lazzeri hits a 2–2 pitch with one out to give the Yankees a sizable lead.
1951	Game 5, October 9	Gil McDougald, New York (AL)	Polo Grounds	Larry Jansen, New York (NL)	3rd	5–1	13–1, W	3–2 NYY	McDougald puts the Yankees up with 2 out in the 3rd. McDougald became the first rookie to get a postseason grand slam.
1953	Game 5, October 4	Mickey Mantle, New York	Ebbets Field	Russ Meyer, Brooklyn	3rd	6–1	11–7, W	3–2 NYY	After a two-out error by Gil Hodges, a hit batter and a walk, Mantle hits reliever Meyer's first pitch out of the park.
1956	Game 2, October 5	Yogi Berra, New York	Ebbets Field	Don Newcombe, Brooklyn	2nd	6–0	13–8, L	2–0 BKN	Berra's blast with 2 out is not enough to hold off the Dodgers in what becomes, at 3 hours 26 minutes, the longest 9-inning game in Series history until 1993.
1956	Game 7, October 10	Moose Skowron, New York	Ebbets Field	Roger Craig, Brooklyn	7th	9–0	9–0, W	4–3 NYY	The Yankees score all their runs on 4 HRs to seal the Series, with Skowron's wallop on the first pitch with none out ending the scoring.
1960	Game 3, October 8	Bobby Richardson, New York	Yankee Stadium	Clem Labine, Pittsburgh	1st	6–0	10–0, W	2–1 NYY	Richardson's HR with 1 out in the 1st starts him toward a Series-record 6 RBI.
1962	Game 4, October 8	Chuck Hiller, San Francisco	Yankee Stadium	Marshall Bridges, New York	7th	6–2	7–3, W	2–2	With 2 out, Hiller hits the first grand slam by a National Leaguer in the Series.
1964	Game 4, October 11	Ken Boyer, St. Louis	Yankee Stadium	Al Downing, New York	6th	4–3	4–3, W	2–2	With men on 1st and 2nd, Bobby Richardson's error with 1 out while seeking a double play opens the gate for Boyer to hit his pivotal blast.
1964	Game 6, October 14	Joe Pepitone, New York	Sportsman's Park	Gordie Richardson, St. Louis	8th	8–1	8–3, W	3–3	With 2 out, Pepitone hits one onto the roof of the right field pavilion to help force Game 7.
1968	Game 6, October 9	Jim Northrup, Detroit	Busch Stadium	Larry Jaster, St. Louis	3rd	8–0	13–1, W	3–3	Northrup's HR with none out is the highlight of a 10-run inning which puts the Tigers ahead 12–0.
1970	Game 3, October 13	Dave McNally, Baltimore	Memorial Stadium	Wayne Granger, Cincinnati	6th	8–1	9–3, W	3–0	Besides his 2-out HR, McNally also pitches a complete game to put Baltimore within one win of the title.
1987	Game 1, October 17	Dan Gladden, Minnesota	Metrodome	Bob Forsch, St. Louis	4th	7–1	10–1, W	1–0 MIN	Gladden's HR with none out caps a 7-run inning which ends the Cardinals' 25-inning shutout streak.
1987	Game 6, October 24	Kent Hrbek, Minnesota	Metrodome	Ken Dayley, St. Louis	6th	10–5	11–5, W	3–3	With 2 out, Hrbek hits reliever Dayley's first pitch out of the park.
1988	Game 1, October 15	José Canseco, Oakland	Dodger Stadium	Tim Belcher, Los Angeles	2nd	4–2	5–4, L	1–0 LAD	With 2 out, Canseco hits his first major league grand slam on a 1–0 pitch; but Kirk Gibson's walk-off home run wins it for the Dodgers.
1992	Game 5, October 22	Lonnie Smith, Atlanta	SkyDome	Jack Morris, Toronto	5th	7–2	7–2, W	3–2 TOR	With 2 out, Smith's HR helps keep the Braves alive in the Series.
1998	Game 1, October 17	Tino Martinez, New York	Yankee Stadium	Mark Langston, San Diego	7th	9–5	9–6, W	1–0 NYY	Martinez' 2-out HR follows Chuck Knoblauch's 3-run game-tying shot earlier in the inning.
2005	Game 2, October 23	Paul Konerko, Chicago White Sox	U.S. Cellular Field	Chad Qualls, Houston Astros	7th	6–4	7–6, W	2–0 CHW	Konerko's 2-out shot to left on reliever Qualls' first pitch gives the White Sox a 6–4 lead, but Scott Podsednik later wins it with a walk-off home run, after Houston tied it at 6 with two outs in the top of the 9th.
2016	Game 6, November 1	Addison Russell, Chicago Cubs	Progressive Field	Dan Otero, Cleveland Indians	3rd	7–0	9–3, W	3–3	With the grand slam, Russell tied the MLB record of 6 RBI in a World Series game, as well as the most on a team facing elimination from the World Series. This is the first MLB grand slam to happen in November.
2019	Game 4, October 26	Alex Bregman, Houston Astros	Nationals Park	Fernando Rodney, Washington Nationals	7th	8–1	8–1, W	2–2	After Kyle Tucker and George Springer led off the inning with consecutive walks and a one-out single by Michael Brantley loaded the bases, Bregman's drive just inside the left-field foul pole increased Houston's lead from 4–1 to 8–1.
2021	Game 5, October 31	Adam Duvall, Atlanta Braves	Truist Park	Framber Valdez, Houston Astros	1st	4–0	9–5, L	3–2 ATL	Duvall put the first four runs on the board with his first-pitch, opposite-field grand slam to right field with two outs in the first inning of this possible close-out game for the Braves. Houston came back to win, though, to keep their title hopes alive.
2024	Game 1, October 25	Freddie Freeman, Los Angeles Dodgers	Dodger Stadium	Nestor Cortes, New York Yankees	10th	6–3	6–3, W	1–0 LAD	After Cortes intentionally walks Mookie Betts to pitch to Freeman, now hobbled by a severely sprained ankle, with two outs in the bottom of the 10th inning and the game tying and winning runners in scoring position, Freeman hits Cortes's first pitch into the right field seats for the first walk-off grand slam in World Series history. In a moment reminiscent of Kirk Gibson's walk-off home run on two badly injured legs to win Game 1 of the 1988 World Series, Joe Davis's call for Fox Sports: "Gibby, meet Freddie!"
2024	Game 4, October 29	Anthony Volpe, New York Yankees	Yankee Stadium	Daniel Hudson, Los Angeles Dodgers	3rd	5–2	11–4, W	3–1 LAD	With two outs in the bottom of the 3rd inning, Volpe hits the first pitch thrown to him 390 feet into the left-center field stands to score Aaron Judge, Jazz Chisholm Jr., and Giancarlo Stanton. This grand slam is the first of three home runs the Yankees will hit to avoid a World Series sweep.
2025	Game 1, October 24	Addison Barger, Toronto Blue Jays	Rogers Centre	Anthony Banda, Los Angeles Dodgers	6th	9–2	11–4, W	1–0 TOR	After the Blue Jays had already scored 3 runs in the 6th inning, Barger, pinch hitting for Davis Schneider, hits a grand slam to right-center field to score Nathan Lukes, Andrés Giménez, and George Springer, and blow the game wide open. Barger's slam is the first pinch-hit grand slam ever hit in a World Series game.

== Other MLB postseason grand slams ==
Series	Game	Batter	Site	Pitcher	Inning	Score after HR	Final score	Series standing	Notes
1970 ALCS	Game 1, October 3	Mike Cuellar, Baltimore	Metropolitan Stadium	Jim Perry, Minnesota	4th	7–2	10–6, W	1–0 BAL	In the first grand slam in the history of the LCS, Cuellar, who batted only .089 in the regular season, pulls the ball down the right field line with one out; clearly foul when passing first base, the 29 mph wind carries it fair. Cuellar himself does not last through the fifth inning.
1977 NLCS	Game 1, October 4	Ron Cey, Los Angeles	Dodger Stadium	Steve Carlton, Philadelphia	7th	5–5	7–5, L	1–0 PHI	With two out, Cey fouls off three full-count pitches before tying the game, but three singles and a balk in the 9th give the Phillies the win.
1977 NLCS	Game 2, October 5	Dusty Baker, Los Angeles	Dodger Stadium	Jim Lonborg, Philadelphia	4th	5–1	7–1, W	1–1	After Steve Garvey is walked intentionally with one out, Baker gives the Dodgers their second grand slam in as many nights.
1982 ALCS	Game 4, October 9	Don Baylor, California	Milwaukee County Stadium	Moose Haas, Milwaukee	8th	5–7	9–5, L	2–2	After Haas takes a no-hitter into the 6th in a game delayed twice by rain, Baylor brings the Angels within two runs with one out in the 8th.
1989 NLCS	Game 1, October 4	Will Clark, San Francisco	Wrigley Field	Greg Maddux, Chicago	4th	8–3	11–3, W	1–0 SF	With two out, Clark hits the first pitch for his second HR of the game; he also singles, doubles and walks, picking up an NLCS-record 6 RBI.
1992 NLCS	Game 2, October 7	Ron Gant, Atlanta	Fulton County Stadium	Bob Walk, Pittsburgh	5th	8–0	13–5, W	2–0 ATL	With two out, Gant hits his first career grand slam to double the Braves' lead.
1995 NLDS	Game 3, October 6	Mark Lewis, Cincinnati	Riverfront Stadium	Mark Guthrie, Los Angeles	6th	7–1	10–1, W	3–0 CIN	After Guthrie enters the game with none out, Lewis hits the first pinch-hit grand slam in postseason history, propelling the Reds to their eighth straight playoff victory and their eighth NLCS.
1995 ALDS	Game 4, October 7	Edgar Martínez, Seattle	Kingdome	John Wetteland, New York	8th	10–6	11–8, W	2–2	After hitting a 3-run HR in the 3rd to cut NY's lead to two runs, Martinez hits another to center field to take the lead for good, finishing with a postseason-record 7 RBI. A walk, bunt single and hit batter had loaded the bases with none out.
1996 ALDS	Game 1, October 1	Bobby Bonilla, Baltimore	Camden Yards	Paul Shuey, Cleveland	6th	9–3	10–4, W	1–0 BAL	After two walks, a single, a sacrifice fly and a hit batter, Shuey enters the game and is greeted by Bonilla's blast with two out.
1996 ALDS	Game 3, October 4	Albert Belle, Cleveland	Jacobs Field	Armando Benítez, Baltimore	7th	8–4	9–4, W	2–1 BAL	After Orioles starter Mike Mussina is controversially pulled after six innings, Jesse Orosco walks the bases loaded and is replaced; Belle crushes an 0–2 pitch with none out to keep the Indians alive in the series. It would be Belle's final hit as an Indian.
1996 NLCS	Game 2, October 10	Gary Gaetti, St. Louis	Fulton County Stadium	Greg Maddux, Atlanta	7th	8–3	8–3, W	1–1	In an inning featuring two walks, an error and a wild pitch, Gaetti wallops the first pitch with two out. Maddux surrenders his second grand slam in 34.2 NLCS innings after allowing only one in 2365.2 regular season innings.
1997 NLDS	Game 3, October 3	Devon White, Florida	3Com Park	Wilson Álvarez, San Francisco	6th	4–1	6–2, W	3–0 FLA	With two out, Florida gets a pair of singles and a walk before White hits Alvarez' 113th pitch to left field. The Marlins advance to their first NLCS, in their fifth year of play.
1997 ALDS	Game 3, October 4	Paul O'Neill, New York	Jacobs Field	Chad Ogea, Cleveland	4th	6–1	6–1, W	2–1 NYY	After starter Charles Nagy walks the bases loaded, O'Neill greets Ogea with a blast to center field with two out as rain begins to fall.
1998 NLDS	Game 1, September 30	Ryan Klesko, Atlanta	Turner Field	Matt Karchner, Chicago	7th	7–0	7–1, W	1–0 ATL	Klesko's homer with two out, following three walks, secures the win for the Braves.
1998 NLDS	Game 3, October 3	Eddie Pérez, Atlanta	Wrigley Field	Rod Beck, Chicago	8th	6–0	6–2, W	3–0 ATL	After Andruw Jones is walked intentionally, Pérez hits a homer with one out to wrap up the series for the Braves, sending the Cubs to their sixth straight playoff loss.
1998 NLCS	Game 4, October 11	Andrés Galarraga, Atlanta	Qualcomm Stadium	Dan Miceli, San Diego	7th	8–3	8–3, W	3–1 SD	After Miceli enters the game, Galarraga caps a 6-run inning with a 459-foot blast to left-center with two out, helping to force a Game 5.
1998 ALCS	Game 6, October 13	Jim Thome, Cleveland	Yankee Stadium	David Cone, New York	5th	5–6	9–5, L	4–2 NYY	Thome's shot into the third deck with one out pulls the Indians within a run, but it isn't enough for the defending AL champions as the Yankees advance to the World Series.
1999 NLDS	Game 1, October 5	Edgardo Alfonzo, New York	Bank One Ballpark	Bobby Chouinard, Arizona	9th	8–4	8–4, W	1–0 NYM	Alfonzo hits his second HR of the game inside the left field foul pole with two out, after Robin Ventura was forced out at the plate one play earlier.
1999 ALDS	Game 2, October 7	Jim Thome, Cleveland	Jacobs Field	John Wasdin, Boston	4th	11–1	11–1, W	2–0 CLE	After a 6-run 3rd inning highlighted by Harold Baines' 3-run HR, Thome makes it a blowout, ending a 5-run inning with a two-out shot and becoming the first player to hit two postseason grand slams.
1999 ALDS	Game 5, October 11	Troy O'Leary, Boston	Jacobs Field	Charles Nagy, Cleveland	3rd	7–5	12–8, W	3–2 BOS	O'Leary homers with one out to give Boston the lead, and later hits a 3-run HR in the 7th to break an 8–8 tie and send the Red Sox to the ALCS; both homers come after intentional walks to Nomar Garciaparra.
1999 ALCS	Game 4, October 17	Ricky Ledée, New York	Fenway Park	Rod Beck, Boston	9th	9–2	9–2, W	3–1 NYY	Ledee hits a pinch-hit HR with one out to wrap up a 6-run inning and the victory. Ledee became the second rookie to hit a postseason grand slam.
1999 NLCS	Game 5, October 17	Robin Ventura, New York	Shea Stadium	Kevin McGlinchy, Atlanta	15th	4–3	4–3, W	3–2 ATL	The Mets tie the score at 3–3 with a bases-loaded walk with one out, bringing up Ventura, who with 13 career grand slams is tied for the lead among active players with Harold Baines and Mark McGwire. He comes through with the first walk-off grand slam – and the first grand slam in extra innings – in postseason history, clearing the right-center field wall, but is officially credited with only a 1-run single after being mobbed by teammates upon passing first base.
2003 NLCS	Game 4, October 11	Aramis Ramírez, Chicago	Pro Player Stadium	Dontrelle Willis, Florida	1st	4–0	8–3, W	3–1 CHC	After Willis walks the bases loaded with one out, Ramírez gets the Cubs off to an early lead by hitting a 2–2 pitch into the left field seats. This was the first time in Cubs history that a player hit a grand slam in the postseason.
2004 ALDS	Game 3, October 8	Vladimir Guerrero, Anaheim	Fenway Park	Mike Timlin, Boston	7th	6–6	8–6, L	3–0 BOS	Guerrero ties the score with a two-out HR to right on a 0–1 pitch, but the Red Sox score two in the 10th to advance to the ALCS.
2004 ALCS	Game 7, October 20	Johnny Damon, Boston	Yankee Stadium	Javier Vázquez, New York	2nd	6–0	10–3, W	4–3 BOS	Damon homers to right on reliever Vázquez' first pitch with one out, staking Boston to an early lead; he homers again in the 4th for an 8–1 lead as the Red Sox complete their comeback after being down 3 games to 0.
2005 NLDS	Game 1, October 4	Reggie Sanders, St. Louis	Busch Stadium	Jake Peavy, San Diego	5th	8–0	8–5, W	1–0 STL	With one out, Sanders homers on a 3–0 fastball from Peavy, who was unknowingly pitching with a fractured rib.
2005 NLDS	Game 4, October 9	Adam LaRoche, Atlanta	Minute Maid Park	Brandon Backe, Houston	3rd	4–0	7–6, L	3–1 HOU	LaRoche, battling stomach flu, homers with two out, after two walks and a hit batter, to give the Braves an early lead, but the Astros tie the game 6–6 in the 9th and win in 18 innings to advance to the NLCS.
2005 NLDS	Game 4, October 9	Lance Berkman, Houston	Minute Maid Park	Kyle Farnsworth, Atlanta	8th	5–6	7–6, W	3–1 HOU	With one out, Berkman hits an opposite-field homer to left on a 2–1 pitch to bring the Astros within a run; it is the first time that two grand slams are hit in the same postseason game. After tying the game in the 9th, the Astros win the series on Chris Burke's walk-off homer in the 18th, making it the second longest game in postseason history.
2007 NLDS	Game 2, October 4	Kaz Matsui, Colorado Rockies	Citizens Bank Park	Kyle Lohse, Philadelphia Phillies	4th	6–3	10–5, W	2–0 COL	Matsui's slam gives the Rockies a 6–3 lead on the way to winning the game 10–5 and giving Colorado a 2–0 series lead.
2007 ALCS	Game 6, October 20	J. D. Drew, Boston Red Sox	Fenway Park	Fausto Carmona, Cleveland Indians	1st	4–0	12–2 W	3–3	Drew gave the Red Sox an early lead in the must-win game as the Red Sox tied the series.
2008 NLDS	Game 1, October 1	James Loney, Los Angeles Dodgers	Wrigley Field	Ryan Dempster, Chicago Cubs	5th	4–2	7–2, W	1–0 LAD	After Dempster walked the bases loaded, Loney hits it to center to give the Dodgers a 4–2 lead.
2008 NLDS	Game 2, October 2	Shane Victorino, Philadelphia Phillies	Citizens Bank Park	CC Sabathia, Milwaukee Brewers	2nd	5–1	5–2, W	2–0 PHI	Victorino's slam, the first in Phillies postseason history, broke a 1–1 tie after pitcher Brett Myers drew a two-out walk in a nine-pitch at-bat.
2011 ALDS	Game 1, October 1	Robinson Canó, New York Yankees	Yankee Stadium	Al Alburquerque, Detroit Tigers	6th	8–1	9–3, W	1–0 NYY	Gardner singled, Jeter stole second, Granderson walked. After a pitching change, Robinson Canó hit a 375-foot blast to give the Yankees an 8–1 lead over the Tigers. Cano hit six RBIs this game, barely missing another homer in the previous inning. He tied the Yankees post-season single game record. This was the first home run hit off of Alburquerque this season.
2011 NLDS	Game 3, October 4	Paul Goldschmidt, Arizona Diamondbacks	Chase Field	Shaun Marcum, Milwaukee Brewers	5th	7–1	8–1, W	2–1 MIL	Back-to-back singles to Josh Collmenter and Willie Bloomquist. Two outs later, with first base open, Marcum intentionally walked Miguel Montero, who had two RBIs to that point in the game, to get to Goldschmidt. Marcum jumped ahead of Goldschmidt, 1–2, before leaving a fastball out over the plate. Goldschmidt drove the ball the opposite way and over the wall in right to give Arizona a 7–1 lead. Goldschmidt became the third rookie to hit a postseason grand slam.
2011 NLDS	Game 4, October 5	Ryan Roberts, Arizona Diamondbacks	Chase Field	Randy Wolf, Milwaukee Brewers	1st	4–1	10–6, W	2–2	Bloomquist singled out in centerfield. Aaron Hill fouled out to first base. Justin Upton walked, while Montero singled out in the right field. Goldschmidt, who hit a grand slam a day earlier, struck out looking. Wolf jumped behind of Roberts, 2–1, before leaving a 79 mph changeup out over the plate. Roberts drove the ball to opposite and over the wall in left to give Arizona a 4–1 lead. Moments later, Chris Young hit a home run out to centerfield.
2011 ALCS	Game 2, October 10	Nelson Cruz, Texas Rangers	Rangers Ballpark in Arlington	Ryan Perry, Detroit Tigers	11th	7–3	7–3, W	2–0 TEX	In the 11th, after Perry came in to replace Valverde, Michael Young singles on a sharp ground ball to left fielder Ryan Raburn. Adrián Beltré singles on a line drive to center fielder Austin Jackson. Michael Young to 2nd. Coaching visit to mound. Mike Napoli singles on a fly ball to center fielder Austin Jackson, loading the bases. Nelson Cruz hits a grand slam (3) to left field. Young, Beltre, and Napoli score on the home run. First official (see Grand Slam Single) walk-off grand slam in postseason history. "
2012 NLDS	Game 5, October 11	Buster Posey, San Francisco Giants	Great American Ball Park	Mat Latos, Cincinnati Reds	5th	6–0	6–4, W	3–2 SF	After the Giants scored two runs in the inning, the bases were loaded for Posey. He hit a home run off the upper deck, giving the Giants a 6–0 lead they did not relinquish. The runs proved to be critical, as the Reds rallied to make the game close, but the Giants held on to win 6–4. The win completed the Giants' comeback from being down 2 games to 0 in the series, the first time that happened in NL Divisional play. The Giants won all three on the road, as the series became the second five-game series to not have a single win by a home team (after the 2010 ALDS between the Rangers and Rays).
2013 ALCS	Game 2, October 13	David Ortiz, Boston Red Sox	Fenway Park	Joaquín Benoit, Detroit Tigers	8th	5–5	6–5, W	1–1	With the Red Sox trailing 5–1 in the bottom of the eighth, David Ortiz came up with the bases loaded and two out. Ortiz lined Benoit's first pitch into the right-field bullpen sending outfielder Torii Hunter flying over the wall, tying the game at 5. The Red Sox would go on to win the game 6–5 in the bottom of the ninth on a walk-off single by Jarrod Saltalamacchia.
2013 ALCS	Game 6, October 19	Shane Victorino, Boston Red Sox	Fenway Park	José Veras, Detroit Tigers	7th	5–2	5–2, W	4–2 BOS	In the bottom of the seventh inning, with the Tigers ahead 2–1 and Victorino down in the count 0–2 on well-placed curveballs, he sent the third pitch (also a curveball, but up in the zone) over the Green Monster. Victorino ended a 2-for-23 slump with this blast, becoming only the second player ever, alongside Jim Thome, to have hit two postseason grand slams.
2014 NLWCG	n/a October 1	Brandon Crawford, San Francisco Giants	PNC Park	Edinson Vólquez, Pittsburgh Pirates	4th	4–0	8–0, W	n/a	After singles by Pablo Sandoval and Hunter Pence and a walk to Brandon Belt, Crawford unloaded the bases with a 362-foot grand slam to right field, opening the game's scoring. His grand slam was the first to be hit by a shortstop in postseason history.
2016 NLCS	Game 1, October 15	Miguel Montero, Chicago Cubs	Wrigley Field	Joe Blanton, Los Angeles Dodgers	8th	7–3	8–4, W	1–0 CHC	After the Dodgers tied it in the top of the 8th inning, Montero's pinch-hit grand slam into the right-field bleachers broke the tie.
2017 ALDS	Game 2, October 6	Francisco Lindor, Cleveland Indians	Progressive Field	Chad Green, New York Yankees	6th	7–8	9–8, W	2–0 CLE	With two outs in the 6th, Lonnie Chisenhall was grazed by a 2-strike pitch that appeared to have possibly struck the knob of his bat before landing in the catcher's mitt for an inning-ending foul-tip strikeout. The Yankees chose not to challenge the umpire's call that Chisenhall was hit by the pitch to load the bases. Lindor then blasted a towering fly ball high off the right-field foul pole to cut the Yankees' 5-run lead down to 1. The Indians later finished their comeback with a walk-off single by Yan Gomes in the 13th inning.
2017 NLDS	Game 4, October 11	Michael A. Taylor, Washington Nationals	Wrigley Field	Wade Davis, Chicago Cubs	8th	5–0	5–0, W	2–2	After inheriting Daniel Murphy on first base from Jon Lester, Carl Edwards Jr. issued back-to-back 2-out walks to Anthony Rendon and Matt Wieters to load the bases. Davis was then brought in to face Taylor with the hope of holding the Nationals' lead at 1–0. Taylor hit a 1–1 fastball from Davis into the chain-link net at the top of the right-center-field wall to clear the bases and expand the lead to 5–0.
2017 NLCS	Game 5, October 19	Kiké Hernández, Los Angeles Dodgers	Wrigley Field	Hector Rondon, Chicago Cubs	3rd	7–0	11–1, W	4–1 LAD	Hernández's grand slam on a fly ball to right field was the second of his three home runs on the night, which made Hernández the 10th player ever to hit 3 homers in a postseason game. In this close-out game, Hernández drove in 7 runs to tie the Major League record for RBI in a postseason game and help send the Dodgers to the World Series for the first time since 1988.
2018 NLDS	Game 3, October 7	Ronald Acuña Jr., Atlanta Braves	SunTrust Park	Walker Buehler, Los Angeles Dodgers	2nd	5–0	6–5, W	2–1 LAD	After pitcher Sean Newcomb drew a bases-loaded walk to drive in the Braves' first run of the series, breaking a string of 19 2/3 consecutive scoreless innings, Acuña's towering fly ball into the left-field bleachers off a 3-1 fastball at the top of the strike zone expanded the Braves' lead to 5–0. (Acuña almost walked in the at-bat after taking a 3-0 fastball that was called a strike despite sailing above the strike zone.) At 20 years and 293 days old, Acuña became the youngest player to hit a postseason grand slam in Major League history, surpassing Mickey Mantle (who was 21 years, 349 days old when he hit one in the 1953 World Series).
2018 ALCS	Game 3, October 16	Jackie Bradley Jr., Boston Red Sox	Minute Maid Park	Roberto Osuna, Houston Astros	8th	8–2	8–2, W	2–1 BOS	After consecutive batters Brock Holt and Mitch Moreland were hit by pitches to load the bases then drive in a run with two outs, JBJ launched a fly ball over the right-field wall to clear the bases and break the game open.
2019 ALDS	Game 2, October 5	Didi Gregorius, New York Yankees	Yankee Stadium	Tyler Duffey, Minnesota Twins	3rd	7–0	8–2, W	2–0 NYY	Didi's towering fly ball down the right-field line into the second deck broke the game open and sent the Yankees on their way to their Major League record 12th consecutive postseason victory over the Twins.
2019 NLDS	Game 5, October 9	Howie Kendrick, Washington Nationals	Dodger Stadium	Joe Kelly, Los Angeles Dodgers	10th	7–3	7–3, W	3–2 WSH	Kendrick's grand slam to center field with no outs in the top of the 10th inning capped a comeback in which the Nationals erased a 3–1 deficit by hitting home runs on consecutive pitches from Clayton Kershaw in the 8th. With the win, the Nationals won their first NLDS in five tries (after losing the series in 2012, 2014, 2016, & 2017) and advanced to the NLCS for the first time since 1981, when they were the Montreal Expos.
2020 NLCS	Game 3, October 14	Max Muncy, Los Angeles Dodgers	Globe Life Field	Grant Dayton, Atlanta Braves	1st	11–0	15–3, W	2–1 ATL	Muncy blasted a grand slam to the right center field with 2 outs in the top of the 1st inning to extend the Dodgers' lead to 11. The 11 runs scored by the Dodgers also set an MLB postseason record for most runs scored in one inning.
2021 ALDS	Game 2, October 8	Jordan Luplow, Tampa Bay Rays	Tropicana Field	Chris Sale, Boston Red Sox	1st	5–2	14–6, L	1–1	With one out in the bottom of the first inning, Luplow slugged a high 0-2 fastball from Sale down the left-field line for a grand slam that gave the Rays a short-lived 5–2 lead. The Red Sox reclaimed the lead in the 5th inning and never trailed again in a 14-6 slugfest that featured five Boston home runs.
2021 ALCS	Game 2, October 16	J. D. Martinez, Boston Red Sox	Minute Maid Park	Luis García, Houston Astros	1st	4–0	9–5, W	1–1	After Kyle Schwarber led off the game with a double and Rafael Devers and Alex Verdugo walked to load the bases, the right-handed hitting Martinez sliced an opposite-field home run into the right-field seats to clear the bases and give the Red Sox an early 4–0 lead.
2021 ALCS	Game 2, October 16	Rafael Devers, Boston Red Sox	Minute Maid Park	Jake Odorizzi, Houston Astros	2nd	8–0	9–5, W	1–1	With one out in the 2nd inning, Rafael Devers blasted a towering fly ball just inside the right-field foul pole for Boston's second grand slam in as many innings. With the Devers slam, the Red Sox became the first team in postseason history to hit two grand slams in one game.
2021 ALCS	Game 3, October 18	Kyle Schwarber, Boston Red Sox	Fenway Park	José Urquidy, Houston Astros	2nd	6–0	12–3, W	2–1 BOS	After the Red Sox loaded the bases and scored two runs on a single by Christian Vázquez and a grounder by Christian Arroyo that Houston second baseman Jose Altuve mishandled for an error, Schwarber emptied the bases with a grand slam just feet inside the Pesky Pole in right field on a 3-0 fastball. The slam by Schwarber was the third grand slam hit by a Boston player in two games, making the Red Sox the first team to hit three grand slams in a single postseason series (matching the total number of grand slams the Red Sox hit through the entire 2021 regular season).
2023 NLWCS	Game 2, October 4	Bryson Stott, Philadelphia Phillies	Citizens Bank Park	Andrew Nardi, Miami Marlins	6th	7–0	7–1, W	2–0 PHI	Bryson Stott's grand slam to right center field with one out in the bottom of the sixth inning scores Alec Bohm, Bryce Harper, and Nick Castellanos to give the Phillies a 7–0 lead in this Wild Card Series closeout game.
2023 ALDS	Game 2, October 8	Mitch Garver, Texas Rangers	Oriole Park at Camden Yards	Jacob Webb, Baltimore Orioles	3rd	9–2	11–8, W	2–0 TEX	Mitch Garver's 419-ft home run to left field with one out in the top of the third inning scores Leody Taveras, Marcus Semien, and Corey Seager to expand the Rangers' lead to 9–2. Garver's 5 RBI for the game ties the Rangers' postseason single-game record previously held by Nelson Cruz and Michael Young.
2023 ALCS	Game 6, October 22	Adolis García, Texas Rangers	Minute Maid Park	Ryne Stanek, Houston Astros	9th	9–2	9–2, W	3–3	One out after Corey Seager gets hit by a pitch to drive in a run and extend the Rangers' lead to 5–2, García blasts a low line drive into the left field seats on a 1–1 fastball to clear the bases and slam the door on the Astros' bid to win the ALCS in six games. With the slam, García becomes the first player to strike out four times and hit a grand slam in the same postseason game. García's grand slam is also the third of six home runs he would hit over a span of five consecutive postseason games and contributes four of his record 22 RBI in one postseason.
2024 NLDS	Game 3, October 8	Teoscar Hernández, Los Angeles Dodgers	Petco Park	Michael King, San Diego Padres	3rd	5–6	5–6, L	2–1 SD	Teoscar Hernández's 403-foot home run to center field with one out in the top of the third inning scores Andy Pages, Shohei Ohtani, and Mookie Betts to cut the Padres' lead to 6-5.
2024 NLDS	Game 4, October 9	Francisco Lindor, New York Mets	Citi Field	Carlos Estévez, Philadelphia Phillies	6th	4–1	4–1, W	3–1 NYM	Lindor's one-out slam to right-center field scores Starling Marte, Tyrone Taylor, and Francisco Álvarez to give the Mets a 4-1 lead in this closeout game that sends the Mets to the NLCS for the first time since 2015. With this blast, Lindor joins Jim Thome and Shane Victorino as only the third player to hit two postseason grand slams in his career.
2024 ALDS	Game 5, October 12	Lane Thomas, Cleveland Guardians	Progressive Field	Tarik Skubal, Detroit Tigers	5th	5–1	7–3, W	3–2 CLE	After José Ramirez ties the game at 1-1 with an RBI hit-by-pitch, Thomas homers to left field on the first pitch from the American League Pitching Triple Crown winner to clear the bases and give Cleveland a 5-1 lead in this winner-take-all Game 5. With the win, the Guardians advance to their first ALCS since 2016, when they were the Indians.
2024 NLCS	Game 2, October 14	Mark Vientos, New York Mets	Dodger Stadium	Landon Knack, Los Angeles Dodgers	2nd	6–0	7–3, W	1–1	Vientos homers 391 feet to center field after Landon Knack's pitch, causing Jesse Winker, Tyrone Taylor, and Francisco Lindor to score, giving the Mets a 6-0 lead.
2025 ALDS	Game 2, October 5	Vladimir Guerrero Jr, Toronto Blue Jays	Rogers Centre	Will Warren, New York Yankees	4th	9–0	13–7, W	2–0 TOR	Guerrero Jr homers 410 feet to left field after Warren’s pitch, causing Andrés Giménez, Myles Straw, and George Springer to score, giving the Blue Jays a 9-0 lead. With Guerrero Jr's father, Vladimir Guerrero Sr, having hit a grand slam for the Anaheim Angels in the 2004 ALDS against the Boston Red Sox, the Guerreros become the first father-son duo in MLB history to both hit postseason grand slams.
2025 ALCS	Game 5, October 17	Eugenio Suárez, Seattle Mariners	T-Mobile Park	Seranthony Dominguez, Toronto Blue Jays	8th	6–2	6–2, W	3–2 SEA	After Cal Raleigh tied the score at 2–2 with a solo home run, the Mariners loaded the bases with consecutive walks to Jorge Polanco and Josh Naylor and a hit-by-pitch to Randy Arozarena. Suárez then hit an opposite-field grand slam to right field to break the tie and give the Mariners a commanding 6–2 lead. The slam was Suarez's second home run of the game.

== MLB All-Star Game grand slams ==
Year	Batter	Date and Site	Pitcher	Inning	Score after HR	Final score	Notes
1983	Fred Lynn, AL (California)	July 6, Comiskey Park	Atlee Hammaker, NL (San Francisco)	3rd	9–1	13–3, W	In the 50th anniversary game, Lynn hits the first grand slam in All-Star history to right field on a 2–2 pitch with two out, capping a 7-run inning and virtually ensuring the AL's first victory since 1971 and second since 1962. Just before the pitch, NBC put on-screen a graphic indicating that there had never been a grand slam hit in All-Star history.

== See also ==
- Grand Slam Single
- List of Major League Baseball single-game grand slam leaders
