= Mount Vernon Mill No. 3 =

Textile mill in Trion, Georgia

Coordinates: 34°32′52″N 85°18′39″W

Mount Vernon Mill No. 3 is a textile denim mill located in Trion, Georgia, a very small town in Chattooga County. Mount Vernon pays about eighty percent of Trion's taxes. It is the largest employer in Chattooga County, with about 1700 employees.

== History ==
Mount Vernon Mill No. 3 was the first cotton mill in northwest Georgia. Andrew P. Allgood, Spencer S. Marsh, and Col. W.K. Briers organized the Trion factory on October 12, 1845.

In 1912, Benjamin D. Riegel became the new owner of the mill until his death in 1941.

In 1913, a gym, library, apartments, theater, bowling alley, and hospital were built in Trion.

During World War II, the mill produced enough fabric to make 10,500,000 fatigue suits and over seven and a half billion yards for gun patches.

In 1971, many new machines were installed to produce denim.

Benjamin Riegel's daughter decided to sell her stock to Robert B. Pamplin in 1985 because she thought that he could take care of the company and town like her father did.

On February 16, 1990, a flood almost ruined the machines, but after ten days the mill was running again.

== Today ==
Today the mill has over a million square feet of manufacturing space and produces over two million pounds of cotton and denim each week. The denim is shipped to different locations in the United States and to foreign countries.
