= Rick Camp =

American baseball player (1953-2013)

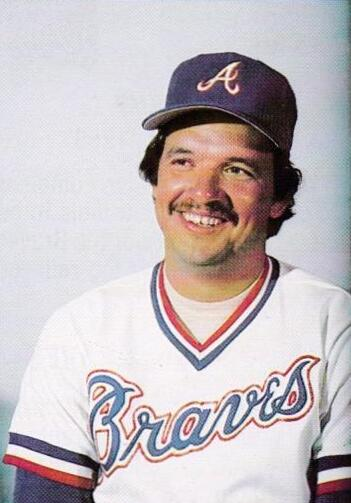
- Camp with the Atlanta Braves c. 1981
- Pitcher
- Born: June 10, 1953; Trion, Georgia, U.S.
- Died: April 25, 2013 (aged 59); Rydal, Georgia, U.S.
- Batted: Right Threw: Right

MLB debut
- September 15, 1976, for the Atlanta Braves

Last MLB appearance
- October 5, 1985, for the Atlanta Braves

MLB statistics
- Win–loss record: 56–49
- Earned run average: 3.37
- Strikeouts: 407
- Saves: 57
- Stats at Baseball Reference

Teams
- Atlanta Braves (1976–1978, 1980–1985)

Rick Lamar Camp (June 10, 1953 – April 25, 2013) was an American professional baseball pitcher who played in Major League Baseball (MLB) for a total of nine seasons with the Atlanta Braves between 1976 and 1985.

== Biography ==
Camp was born in Trion, Georgia. He pitched for the Atlanta Braves for nine seasons between 1976 and 1985.

He was best known for hitting a game-tying 18th-inning home run in a game that began on July 4, 1985, and ended on July 5, against the New York Mets with two outs and an 0–2 count off Tom Gorman; this was the only home run of his twelve-season pro career (including nine in the majors). Representing the tying run in the 19th inning, Camp struck out to end the game and was the losing pitcher. The Braves had run out of position players and had no choice but to let Camp bat in the 18th and 19th innings, even though his major league batting average entering the game was .060. (He finished his career with an average of .074.) The game started on July 4 at 7:05 pm, but due to extra innings and three long rain delays, it did not end until 3:55 am on July 5, the second latest any major league game has ever ended (after the last out, the night still wasn't over for people in Atlanta, as the Braves gave their fans a promised fireworks show at 4:00am, which drew a number of complaints from neighborhood residents). (Note: Eight years later, the record was topped by a doubleheader between the San Diego Padres at Philadelphia Phillies of July 2–3, 1993, which saw the second game end at 4:40 am, coincidentally occurring after rain had delayed the start of the first game. Veterans Stadium also had a scheduled fireworks display that night but postponed it.) It was the only home run he ever hit in the majors and it occurred in his final season as a pitcher.

In September 2005, Camp was sentenced, along with four other people, including former Georgia State Representative Robin L. Williams, to a term in federal prison for conspiring to steal more than $2 million from the Community Mental Health Center in Augusta, Georgia. Camp received a three-year sentence, while Williams got ten years.

Camp died on April 25, 2013, at his home at the age of 59.
