= Robin Ventura =

American baseball player and manager (born 1967)

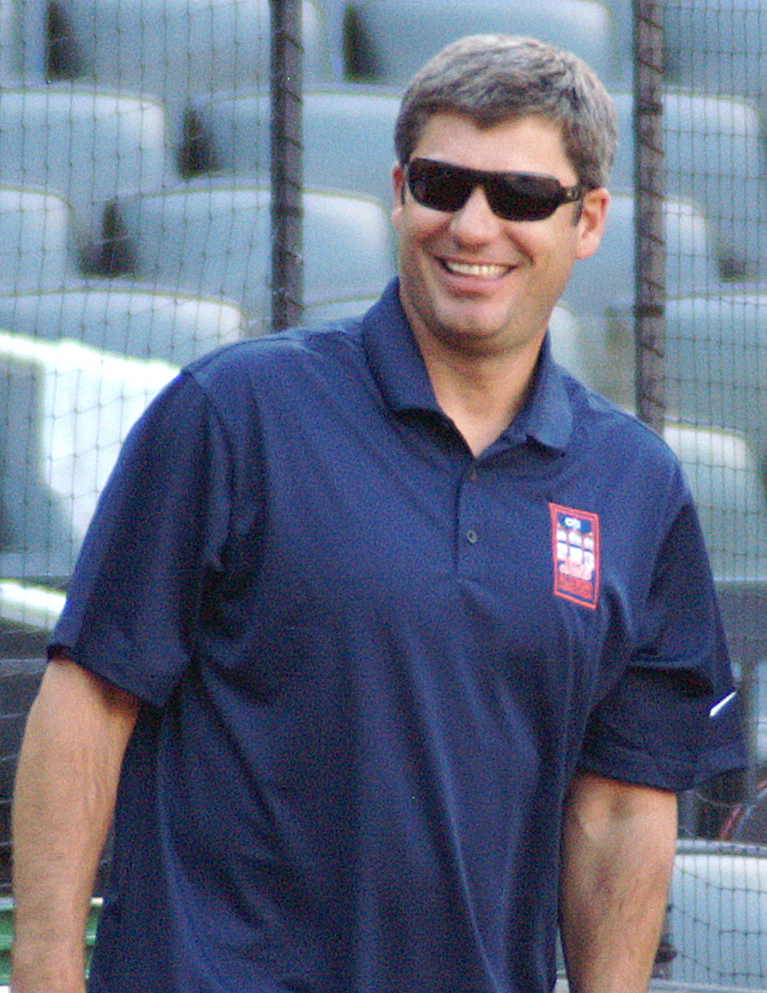
- Ventura in 2011
- Third baseman / Manager
- Born: July 14, 1967 (age 59); Santa Maria, California, U.S.
- Batted: Left Threw: Right

MLB debut
- September 12, 1989, for the Chicago White Sox

Last MLB appearance
- October 2, 2004, for the Los Angeles Dodgers

MLB statistics
- Batting average: .267
- Home runs: 294
- Runs batted in: 1,182
- Managerial record: 375–435
- Winning %: .463
- Stats at Baseball Reference
- Managerial record at Baseball Reference

Teams
- As player: Chicago White Sox (1989–1998); New York Mets (1999–2001); New York Yankees (2002–2003); Los Angeles Dodgers (2003–2004); As manager: Chicago White Sox (2012–2016)

Career highlights and awards
- 2× All-Star (1992, 2002); 6× Gold Glove Award (1991–1993, 1996, 1998, 1999); Golden Spikes Award (1988); Dick Howser Trophy (1988)
Medals
Baseball
Representing United States
Olympic Games
Gold medal – first place	1988 Seoul	Team
Baseball World Cup
Silver medal – second place	1988 Rome	Team
Intercontinental Cup
Silver medal – second place	1987 Havana	Team

Robin Mark Ventura (born July 14, 1967) is an American former professional baseball third baseman and manager. Ventura played 16 seasons in Major League Baseball (MLB) for the Chicago White Sox, New York Mets, New York Yankees and Los Angeles Dodgers. He was also the manager for the White Sox for five seasons. The White Sox selected Ventura with the tenth overall pick in the 1988 amateur draft from Oklahoma State University (OSU). He is a six-time Rawlings Gold Glove winner, two-time MLB All-Star selection and a National College Baseball Hall of Fame inductee.

While playing college baseball for the Cowboys at OSU, Ventura was a three-time All-American who achieved a Division I-record 58-game hitting streak. In 1988, he won the Dick Howser Trophy and Golden Spikes Award and played for the gold medal-winning Olympic baseball team. In his MLB career, he hit 18 grand slams, ranking fifth all-time. In Game 5 of the 1999 National League Championship Series, Ventura hit the "Grand Slam Single" that won the game but did not actually become a home run because he was unable to complete the circuit around the base paths. Later in his playing career, cartilage and arthritis issues in his ankle hampered his abilities in the field.

After the 2011 season, the White Sox hired Ventura to be their manager. He managed the team from 2012 until 2016.

== Amateur career ==
Born to parents John and Darlene Ventura on July 14, 1967, in Santa Maria, California, Ventura is of Italian and Portuguese descent. After attending Righetti High School in Orcutt, California, Ventura was a 3-time All-American at Oklahoma State University, where he played college baseball for the Oklahoma State Cowboys.

With the Cowboys, Ventura led the nation in runs (107), runs batted in (RBIs; 96) and total bases (204) in 69 games as a freshman in 1986. In 1987, he had an NCAA-record 58-game hitting streak, breaking the previous record of 47; he also led Division I in RBIs two years in a row. His hitting streak remains the Division I record, though his mark was surpassed in 2003 by Damian Costantino of Division III Salve Regina University, who had a 60-game streak.

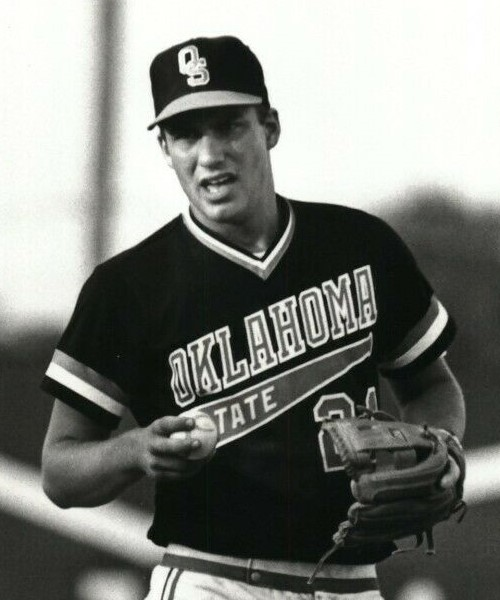
Ventura with Oklahoma State in 1987

Ventura helped OSU reach the finals of the 1987 College World Series, although they lost the championship game to a Stanford University team that included future teammate Jack McDowell. Ventura collected four hits – including a pair of doubles – in the final game and batted .364 for the series. That summer, he played for the Hyannis Mets in the Cape Cod Baseball League (CCBL), hitting .370 and led the league in runs batted in with 37. On January 19, 2002, Ventura was inducted into the CCBL Hall of Fame as a member of the class of 2001. In January 2020, Ventura returned to Oklahoma State to complete his degree and serves as a student assistant coach for the baseball team.

In 1988, Ventura earned a spot on the gold medal-winning Olympic baseball team, batting .409 during the tournament. He won both the Golden Spikes Award and the Dick Howser Trophy for outstanding collegiate play, concluding his 3-year OSU career with a .428 batting average, a .792 slugging percentage, and 302 RBI. On July 4, 2006, Ventura was inducted into the College Baseball Hall of Fame as a member of its inaugural class.

== Professional career ==
=== Chicago White Sox ===
After being picked tenth in the 1988 Major League Baseball draft by the White Sox, Ventura spent much of 1989 at AA Birmingham before joining the White Sox that September. While in Birmingham, he earned a spot in the Southern League All-Star Game and was voted the league's top defensive third baseman. He was named to the 1990 Topps All-Star Rookie Roster and earned the starting third base role with the White Sox the next spring. While his 1990 rookie year was marred by an 0-for-41 slump and 25 errors, his 123 hits were the most by a White Sox rookie since Ozzie Guillén in 1985; he also led AL rookies with 150 games played. The next year he won his first Gold Glove Award for fielding excellence, set a team record for RBI at third base, and led the AL in putouts. In 1992, Ventura won another Gold Glove and earned a spot on the All-Star team.

In 1993, Ventura saw his batting average drop 20 points to .262, though both his slugging and on-base percentages rose slightly. He also collected his 500th hit that May and won his third straight Gold Glove, while becoming the first AL third baseman with three consecutive 90-RBI campaigns since Graig Nettles (1975–78). On August 4, 1993, during a game against the Texas Rangers, Ventura was hit by a pitch thrown by Nolan Ryan. Ventura charged the mound, where Ryan, 20 years Ventura's senior, placed Ventura in a headlock and punched him six times, causing a bench-clearing brawl. This brawl was voted the top baseball brawl of all time by ESPN's SportsCenter. The White Sox won the AL West that year, which resulted in Ventura's only playoff trip while in Chicago. They would lose in the ALCS to the Toronto Blue Jays.

When play resumed in 1995 following the 1994 strike, Ventura had ten errors in the first ten games. He spent some time at first base that year amid trade rumors, but ended the year with a career-high .295 average, and on September 4 hit two grand slams in one game, the eighth player in history to do so and the first since Frank Robinson in 1970. The next season, he won his fourth Gold Glove, reached new highs in fielding percentage, homers and RBIs, and set team records in career homers by a third baseman (142) and grand slams (9).

When spring training began in 1997 the White Sox were picked by many to win their division. In a spring training game at Ed Smith Stadium, Ventura slid into home plate and caught his foot in the mud, suffering a compound fracture and dislocation to his right ankle. The initial prognosis was that he would be lost for the season. However, Ventura was able to return on July 24, more than a week ahead of the most optimistic predictions. He collected the game-winning hit that night, and homered in his first at-bat the next evening. The White Sox did not make the playoffs, in part due to the "White Flag Trade". In 1998, Ventura's final season with the Sox, he won his fifth Gold Glove, but only hit .263. His homer and RBI totals were close to his career averages, but the White Sox attempted repeatedly to trade him and declined to renew his contract, with owner Jerry Reinsdorf claiming that he was "deteriorating."

=== New York Mets ===
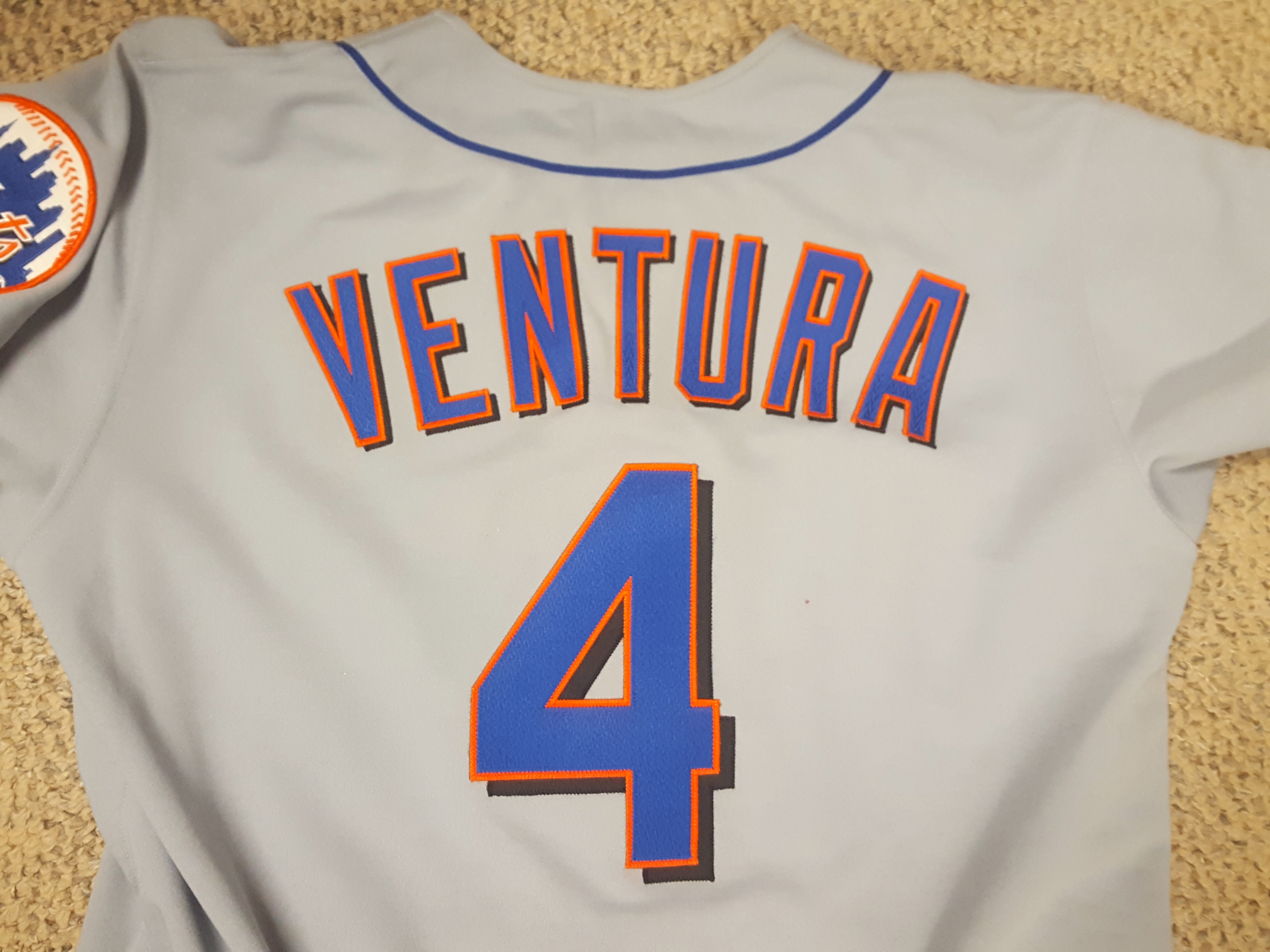
1999 New York Mets #4 Robin Ventura road jersey

Ventura departed Chicago in December 1998 when the New York Mets signed him to a four-year deal. In his first year in New York, Ventura hit .301 with 32 homers, 120 RBI and just nine errors in the field. On May 20, he became the first player ever to hit a grand slam in both games of a doubleheader. In 1999, he and fellow infielders Edgardo Alfonzo, Rey Ordóñez, and John Olerud were featured on the cover of Sports Illustrated as the "Best Infield Ever." However, Ventura injured his left knee in August; when the problem finally came to light, just before the postseason, it had worsened into a tear of the cartilage. Ventura borrowed the phrase "Mojo Risin" from The Doors' "L.A. Woman" and made it the rally cry for the Mets that year, meeting Doors lead singer Jim Morrison's widow Patricia Kennealy-Morrison when the Mets invited her to a game just before the playoffs.

Despite his injury, Ventura provided the game-winning, bases-loaded, two-out single in the eleventh inning against the Pirates on the final weekend of the regular season. After sweeping Pittsburgh, the Mets defeated the Cincinnati Reds in a play-in game to determine the National League Wild Card team. In Game 5 of the 1999 NLCS, with the Atlanta Braves up 3–2 in the fifteenth inning, a bases-loaded walk to Todd Pratt forced in the tying run and brought Ventura to the plate. Ventura hit a home run into right-center field. Pratt, however, did not see the ball leave the park and ran back to first base, hoisting Ventura into the air and lugging him off the field before he could round the bases. The hit was officially scored an RBI single, commonly referred to as the "Grand Slam Single." The Mets eventually lost the series. He won his first NL Gold Glove that fall, bringing his career total to six.

In 2000, still recovering from off-season surgery on both his knee and right shoulder, he hit just .232 with 24 homers and 84 RBI. He spent part of July on the disabled list with inflammation in his repaired shoulder, and was plagued with errors; but rebounded to hit .320 with three homers and 13 RBIs in the last two weeks of the season. When the Mets reached the World Series, he hit his only World Series home run against the Yankees' Orlando Hernández. In 2001, he batted .237 with 21 homers and 61 RBI.

=== New York Yankees ===
At the end of the season, the Mets traded Ventura to the Yankees for David Justice. In 2002, Ventura batted .247 with 27 homers and 93 RBI, the eighth time he topped 90 RBI. He was selected to his second and final All-Star team, along with all other members of the Yankees infield. In that year, Ventura had the lowest fielding percentage of all third basemen in the major leagues at .941. The Yankees lost the Division Series, where Ventura hit .286 with four RBI.

After hitting free agency, Ventura re-signed with the Yankees on a one-year deal with $5 million. In 2003, he was platooned at third base with Todd Zeile, another former Met. Ventura struggled through the first few months of the year; by late July he hit nine homers and 42 RBI. He tied Shea Hillenbrand for the major league lead in errors by a third baseman, with 23.

=== Los Angeles Dodgers ===
On July 31, 2003, Ventura was traded to the Los Angeles Dodgers in exchange for Bubba Crosby and Scott Proctor. On August 3, he hit an inside-the-park home run in Atlanta for his first home run as a member of the Dodgers. He spent most of the remainder of the season on the bench.

Re-signed by the Dodgers in December, Ventura entered 2004 with a chance to be the Dodgers' starting first baseman, but that changed during the last week of spring training when new general manager Paul DePodesta traded for Cleveland outfielder Milton Bradley. This set off a domino effect that ended in Ventura being relegated to a bench role as a backup infielder and pinch hitter.

He had a game-winning RBI in the second game of the season against the San Diego Padres. He only hit five home runs that season, two of which were pinch-hit game-winning home runs: on July 17 against the Arizona Diamondbacks and on August 1 against the San Diego Padres. He also hit his 17th career grand slam on August 29 against the Mets and his 18th career grand slam on September 7 against the Arizona Diamondbacks. Ventura made his pitching debut on June 25 during a blowout loss against the Anaheim Angels, allowing a single amid three fly ball outs. The Dodgers made it to the NLDS, but lost in four games. The Dodgers went a perfect 10–0 in games that he hit a home run. Ventura retired after the season due to arthritis in his right ankle.

== Post-playing career ==
=== Retirement ===
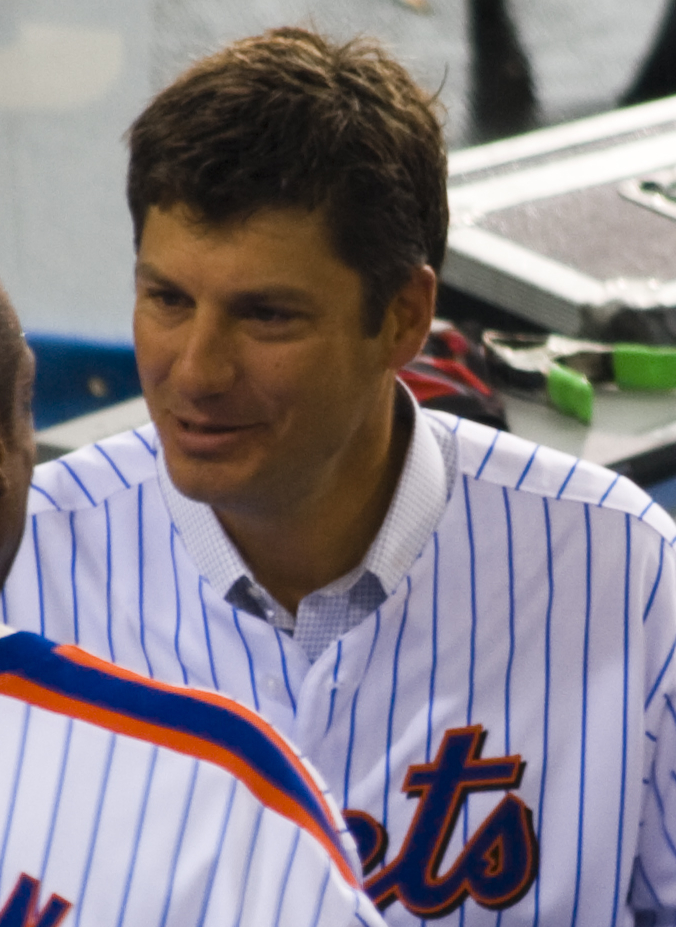
Ventura at the last game at Shea Stadium in 2008

Ventura's 1997 ankle injury—a compound fracture and dislocation—also affected his leg muscles, which began to atrophy following the accident. Full strength in his leg never returned, and the daily pain from his ankle and leg contributed to Ventura's decision to retire from baseball. After retirement, Ventura limped badly and was forced to walk with a cane regularly. On November 18, 2005, Ventura underwent an ankle allograft. Following the surgery and rehabilitation, he now walks without pain and without a limp. He returned to Shea Stadium for the final game on September 28, 2008, for the closing ceremonies with ex-teammates Edgardo Alfonzo, John Franco, Todd Zeile and Mike Piazza.

Ventura's first year of eligibility for the Baseball Hall of Fame was in 2010, when he received just 1.3% of the votes, failing to reach the 5.0% threshold to stay on the ballot. His next opportunity for Hall of Fame consideration will be in 2023 by the Expansion Era Committee.

He was inducted into the Oklahoma Sports Hall of Fame in 2018. In January 2020, Ventura returned to Oklahoma State to complete his degree and serve as a student assistant coach for the baseball team. He earned his bachelor's degree in 2022. Ventura remained on staff with the Cowboys as a volunteer assistant for the 2023 season.

=== Managerial career ===
In June 2011, Ventura joined the White Sox organization as special advisor to director of player development Buddy Bell. Just four months later, he was hired as the 39th manager for the Chicago White Sox on October 6, 2011, succeeding interim manager Don Cooper (who succeeded Ozzie Guillén for two games). Ventura was the 17th former White Sox player to manage the club. In his first season as their manager, the White Sox finished 85–77, three games behind the AL Central champion Detroit Tigers. Ventura's first ejection as a manager came on May 30, 2012, when he was thrown out by umpire Mark Wegner while protesting Wegner's ejection of White Sox pitcher José Quintana. Ventura was a finalist to be the American League Manager of the Year, which was ultimately awarded to Oakland Athletics manager Bob Melvin. Despite ending 2013 in last place, the White Sox re-signed Ventura for the 2014 season.

Chicago planned to bring him back for the 2017 season, despite growing dissatisfaction with Ventura among the fan base. However, after four straight losing seasons, he resigned after the 2016 season.

Team	Year	Regular season					Postseason			
Team	Year	Games	Won	Lost	Win %	Finish	Won	Lost	Win %	Result
CWS	2012	162	85	77	.525	2nd in AL Central	–	–	–	–
CWS	2013	162	63	99	.389	5th in AL Central	–	–	–	–
CWS	2014	162	73	89	.451	4th in AL Central	–	–	–	–
CWS	2015	162	76	86	.469	4th in AL Central	–	–	–	–
CWS	2016	162	78	84	.481	4th in AL Central	–	–	–	–
Total		810	375	435	.463		0	0	–	

=== Broadcasting ===
Ventura has also provided color commentary for the College World Series. In 2010, he worked as a color commentator for the Little League Southwest Region Finals on ESPN with Carter Blackburn. Ventura also occasionally appeared on ESPNU as an anchor.

== Highlights ==
- Golden Spikes Award (nation's best amateur player) (1988)
- 2-time All-Star (1992, 2002)
- 6-time Gold Glove winner at third base (1991–93, 1996, 1998–99)
- Hit two grand slams in one game (September 4, 1995)
- Only player to hit one grand slam during each end of a double-header (May 20, 1999)
- Hit 18 career grand slams, placing him in a tie with Willie McCovey for 5th on the all-time list, behind Alex Rodriguez (25), Lou Gehrig (23), Manny Ramírez (21), and Eddie Murray (19). 6.1% of his career home runs were grand slams, the highest ratio of any player with at least 250 career home runs.
- Hit a "Grand Slam Single" in the 1999 NLCS against the Atlanta Braves (see walk-off home run)
- Named American League Player of the Month, July 1991
- Was one of the first class of inductees into the College Baseball Hall of Fame on July 4, 2006
- Inducted into Oklahoma State University Athletic Hall of Fame on October 17, 2009, along with Barry Sanders, and Garth Brooks.
- Introduced as inductee into Oklahoma Sports Hall of Fame on February 19, 2018.

== Career rankings ==
Third basemen with most 90-RBI seasons

- Mike Schmidt – 11 (1974–1977, 1979–1981, 1983–1984, 1986–1987)
- Eddie Mathews – 10 (1953–1957, 1959–1962, 1965)
- Robin Ventura – 8 (1991–1993, 1995–1996, 1998–1999, 2002)
- Pie Traynor – 8 (1923, 1925–1931)
- Ken Boyer – 8 (1956, 1958–1964)
- Ron Santo – 8 (1963–1970)
- Chipper Jones – 8 (1996–2001, 2004, 2007)

Note: Schmidt also had one 90-RBI season as a first baseman; Jones had two 90-RBI seasons as a left fielder.

Third basemen with highest career slugging average (Minimum 1500 games at 3B)

- Chipper Jones – .533
- Mike Schmidt – .527
- Eddie Mathews – .509
- Matt Williams – .489
- George Brett – .487
- Scott Rolen – .474
- Ron Santo – .464
- Ken Boyer – .462
- Ken Caminiti – .447
- Ron Cey – .445
- Doug DeCinces – .445
- Robin Ventura – .444

== See also ==
- List of Chicago White Sox award winners and league leaders
- List of Major League Baseball career assists as a third baseman leaders
- List of Major League Baseball career double plays as a third baseman leaders
- List of Major League Baseball career putouts as a third baseman leaders
- List of Major League Baseball career home run leaders
- List of Major League Baseball career runs scored leaders
- List of Major League Baseball career runs batted in leaders
- List of Major League Baseball single-game grand slam leaders

Preceded by Craig Worthington	Topps Rookie All-Star Third Baseman; 1990	Succeeded by Leo Gómez
