= 1992 Montreal Expos season =

1992 Montreal Expos
- League: National League
- Division: East
- Ballpark: Olympic Stadium
- City: Montreal
- Record: 87–75
- Divisional place: 2nd
- Owners: Claude Brochu
- General managers: Dan Duquette
- Managers: Felipe Alou
- Television: CTV Television Network; The Sports Network (Dave Van Horne, Ken Singleton) SRC; RDS Network (Claude Raymond, Raymond Lebrun, Denis Casavant, Rodger Brulotte)
- Radio: CIQC (English) (Dave Van Horne, Bobby Winkles, Ken Singleton, Elliott Price) CKAC (French) (Jacques Doucet, Rodger Brulotte)

The 1992 Montreal Expos season was the 24th season in franchise history. They finished the season with a 87–75 record, good for second place in the National League East, 9 games behind the Pittsburgh Pirates.

== Offseason ==
- November 15, 1991: Gary Carter was selected off waivers by the Expos from the Los Angeles Dodgers.
- November 18, 1991: Kenny Williams was released by the Expos.
- November 25, 1991: Andrés Galarraga was traded by the Expos to the St. Louis Cardinals for Ken Hill.
- December 10, 1991: Sergio Valdez was signed as a free agent by the Expos.
- December 11, 1991: Dave Martinez was traded by the Expos to the Cincinnati Reds for John Wetteland.
- January 10, 1992: Scott Service was signed as a free agent by the Expos.
- February 12, 1992: Rick Cerone was signed as a free agent by the Expos.

== Spring training ==
The Expos held spring training at West Palm Beach Municipal Stadium in West Palm Beach, Florida – a facility they shared with the Atlanta Braves. It was their 16th season at the stadium; they had conducted spring training there from 1969 to 1972 and since 1981.

== Regular season ==
=== Season standings ===
NL East
| Team | W | L | Pct. | GB | Home | Road |
|---|---|---|---|---|---|---|
| Pittsburgh Pirates | 96 | 66 | .593 | — | 53‍–‍28 | 43‍–‍38 |
| Montreal Expos | 87 | 75 | .537 | 9 | 43‍–‍38 | 44‍–‍37 |
| St. Louis Cardinals | 83 | 79 | .512 | 13 | 45‍–‍36 | 38‍–‍43 |
| Chicago Cubs | 78 | 84 | .481 | 18 | 43‍–‍38 | 35‍–‍46 |
| New York Mets | 72 | 90 | .444 | 24 | 41‍–‍40 | 31‍–‍50 |
| Philadelphia Phillies | 70 | 92 | .432 | 26 | 41‍–‍40 | 29‍–‍52 |

=== Record vs. opponents ===
1992 National League record Sources:
| Team | ATL | CHC | CIN | HOU | LAD | MON | NYM | PHI | PIT | SD | SF | STL |
|---|---|---|---|---|---|---|---|---|---|---|---|---|
| Atlanta | — | 10–2 | 9–9 | 13–5 | 12–6 | 4–8 | 7–5 | 6–6 | 7–5 | 13–5 | 11–7 | 6–6 |
| Chicago | 2–10 | — | 5–7 | 8–4 | 6–6 | 7–11 | 9–9 | 9–9 | 8–10 | 5–7 | 8–4 | 11–7 |
| Cincinnati | 9–9 | 7–5 | — | 10–8 | 11–7 | 5–7 | 7–5 | 7–5 | 6–6 | 11–7 | 10–8 | 7–5 |
| Houston | 5–13 | 4–8 | 8–10 | — | 13–5 | 8–4 | 5–7 | 8–4 | 6–6 | 7–11 | 12–6 | 5–7 |
| Los Angeles | 6–12 | 6–6 | 7–11 | 5–13 | — | 4–8 | 5–7 | 5–7 | 5–7 | 9–9 | 7–11 | 4–8 |
| Montreal | 8–4 | 11–7 | 7–5 | 4–8 | 8–4 | — | 12–6 | 9–9 | 9–9 | 8–4 | 5–7 | 6–12 |
| New York | 5–7 | 9–9 | 5–7 | 7–5 | 7–5 | 6–12 | — | 6–12 | 4–14 | 4–8 | 10–2 | 9–9 |
| Philadelphia | 6-6 | 9–9 | 5–7 | 4–8 | 7–5 | 9–9 | 12–6 | — | 5–13 | 3–9 | 3–9 | 7–11 |
| Pittsburgh | 5–7 | 10–8 | 6–6 | 6–6 | 7–5 | 9–9 | 14–4 | 13–5 | — | 5–7 | 6–6 | 15–3 |
| San Diego | 5–13 | 7–5 | 7–11 | 11–7 | 9–9 | 4–8 | 8–4 | 9–3 | 7–5 | — | 11–7 | 4–8 |
| San Francisco | 7–11 | 4–8 | 8–10 | 6–12 | 11–7 | 7–5 | 2–10 | 9–3 | 6–6 | 7–11 | — | 5–7 |
| St. Louis | 6–6 | 7–11 | 5–7 | 7–5 | 8–4 | 12–6 | 9–9 | 11–7 | 3–15 | 8–4 | 7–5 | — |

=== Opening Day starters ===
- Iván Calderón
- Gary Carter
- Archi Cianfrocco
- Delino DeShields
- Mark Gardner
- Marquis Grissom
- Spike Owen
- Larry Walker
- Tim Wallach

=== Notable transactions ===
- May 8, 1992: Steve Lyons was signed as a free agent by the Expos.
- June 1, 1992: José Vidro was drafted by the Expos in the 6th round of the 1992 Major League Baseball draft. Player signed June 2, 1992.
- June 27, 1992: Steve Lyons was purchased from the Expos by the Boston Red Sox.
- July 15, 1992: Jerry Willard was signed as a free agent by the Expos.
- July 16, 1992: Rick Cerone was released by the Expos.

=== Roster ===
1992 Montreal Expos
Roster
| Pitchers: 47 Brian Barnes; 46 Kent Bottenfield; 39 Jeff Fassero; 28 Mark Gardner; 42 Chris Haney; 52 Gil Heredia; 44 Ken Hill; 37,56 Jonathan Hurst; 42 Bill Krueger; 34,40 Bill Landrum; 32 Dennis Martínez; 36 Matt Maysey; 43 Chris Nabholz; 50 Bill Risley; 51 Mel Rojas; 55 Bill Sampen; 36 Scott Service; 41 Doug Simons; 26 Sergio Valdez; 57 John Wetteland; 20 Pete Young | Catchers: 8 Gary Carter; 13 Rick Cerone; 24 Darrin Fletcher; 53 Tim Laker; 13 Bob Natal; Infielders: 25 Bret Barberie; 5,42 Sean Berry; 14,61 Archi Cianfrocco; 15 Greg Colbrunn; 12 Wil Cordero; 4 Delino DeShields; 16 Tom Foley; 1 Todd Haney; 11 Spike Owen; 29 Tim Wallach; 2 Jerry Willard | Outfielders: 18 Moisés Alou; 22 Iván Calderón; 9 Marquis Grissom; 2 Steve Lyons; 5 Darren Reed; 3 Matt Stairs; 23 John Vander Wal; 33 Larry Walker; Other batters: 27 Eric Bullock; 19 Jerry Goff | Manager: 17 Felipe Alou (Hired on May 22, 1992); 10 Tom Runnells (Fired on May 22, 1992); Coaches: 67 Pierre Arsenault (Bullpen); 21 Tommy Harper (First Base); 31 Kevin Kennedy (Bench); 45 Joe Kerrigan (Pitching); 6 Jerry Manuel (Third Base); 35 Jay Ward (Hitting) |

=== Game log ===
1992 Game Log
April

| # | Date | Opponent | Score | Win | Loss | Save | Attendance | Record |
|---|---|---|---|---|---|---|---|---|
| 1 | April 6 | @ Pirates | 2–0 | Drabek (1–0) | Martínez (0–1) | Mason (1) | 48,800 | 0–1 |
| 2 | April 8 | @ Pirates | 4–2 | Smith (1–0) | Gardner (0–1) | Belinda (1) | 7,075 | 0–2 |
| 3 | April 9 | @ Pirates | 8–3 | Nabholz (1–0) | Walk (0–1) | | 10,342 | 1–2 |
| 4 | April 10 | @ Mets | 4–0 | Hill (1–0) | Gooden (0–1) | | 47,218 | 2–2 |
| 5 | April 11 | @ Mets | 9–2 | Martínez (1–1) | Cone (0–1) | | 22,967 | 3–2 |
| 6 | April 12 | @ Mets | 8–2 | C. Haney (1–0) | Saberhagen (0–2) | | 21,636 | 4–2 |
| 7 | April 13 | Cardinals | 3–2 | Gardner (1–1) | Cormier (0–1) | Wetteland (1) | 40,907 | 5–2 |
| 8 | April 14 | Cardinals | 3–1 | Osborne (1–0) | Nabholz (1–1) | L. Smith (2) | 12,874 | 5–3 |
| 9 | April 15 | Cardinals | 4–2 | Tewksbury (1–0) | Hill (1–1) | L. Smith (3) | 10,095 | 5–4 |
| 10 | April 17 | Mets | 10–2 | Cone (1–1) | Martínez (1–2) | | 22,406 | 5–5 |
| 11 | April 18 | Mets | 8–6 | Landrum (1–0) | Innis (1–1) | Wetteland (2) | 14,847 | 6–5 |
| 12 | April 19 | Mets | 11–6 | Young (2–0) | Fassero (0–1) | | 13,739 | 6–6 |
| 13 | April 20 | Pirates | 11–1 | Tomlin (3–0) | Hill (1–2) | | 12,351 | 6–7 |
| 14 | April 21 | Pirates | 8–7 | Palacios (1–0) | C. Haney (1–1) | Mason (3) | 7,013 | 6–8 |
| 15 | April 22 | Pirates | 2–0 | Drabek (3–1) | Martínez (1–3) | | 8,421 | 6–9 |
| 16 | April 23 | Pirates | 6–3 | Gardner (2–1) | Smith (3–1) | Wetteland (3) | 5,806 | 7–9 |
| 17 | April 24 | @ Cardinals | 4–3 | Olivares (2–2) | Wetteland (0–1) | | 23,187 | 7–10 |
| 18 | April 25 | @ Cardinals | 2 – 1 (17) | Tewksbury (2–0) | Rojas (0–1) | | 24,849 | 7–11 |
| 19 | April 26 | @ Cardinals | 6–0 | C. Haney (2–1) | Cormier (0–3) | | 25,622 | 8–11 |
| 20 | April 27 | @ Giants | 2–1 | Burba (1–2) | Martínez (1–4) | Brantley (1) | 8,044 | 8–12 |
| 21 | April 28 | @ Giants | 2 – 1 (10) | Brantley (1–0) | Sampen (0–1) | | 8,144 | 8–13 |
| 22 | April 29 | @ Padres | 7–2 | Greg Harris (1–1) | Nabholz (1–2) | | 9,704 | 8–14 |
| 23 | April 30 | @ Padres | 9–3 | Hill (2–2) | Benes (2–2) | | 31,139 | 9–14 |

May

| # | Date | Opponent | Score | Win | Loss | Save | Attendance | Record |
|---|---|---|---|---|---|---|---|---|
| 24 | May 5 | Padres | 5–2 | Martínez (2–4) | Greg Harris (1–2) | | 6,555 | 10–14 |
| 25 | May 6 | Padres | 4–3 | Hill (3–2) | Benes (2–3) | Wetteland (4) | 7,984 | 11–14 |
| 26 | May 8 | Giants | 6–3 | Wilson (2–2) | Fassero (0–2) | Brantley (2) | 13,281 | 11–15 |
| 27 | May 9 | Giants | 9–3 | Nabholz (2–2) | Black (0–1) | | 9,403 | 12–15 |
| 28 | May 10 | Giants | 8 – 3 (11) | Brantley (2–0) | Landrum (1–1) | | 11,275 | 12–16 |
| 29 | May 11 | Dodgers | 6 – 5 (10) | Fassero (1–2) | Wilson (0–3) | | 7,075 | 13–16 |
| 30 | May 12 | Dodgers | 2–0 | Kevin Gross (1–3) | C. Haney (2–2) | | 10,170 | 13–17 |
| 31 | May 13 | Dodgers | 5–1 | Gardner (3–1) | Hershiser (2–3) | Wetteland (5) | 17,562 | 14–17 |
| 32 | May 15 | @ Braves | 4–2 | Mercker (1–0) | Nabholz (2–3) | Stanton (3) | 37,551 | 14–18 |
| 33 | May 16 | @ Braves | 7–1 | Martínez (3–4) | Avery (1–4) | Rojas (1) | 40,504 | 15–18 |
| 34 | May 17 | @ Braves | 5–4 | Hill (4–2) | Glavine (6–2) | Wetteland (6) | 41,480 | 16–18 |
| 35 | May 18 | Reds | 2–1 | Bankhead (4–1) | Gardner (3–2) | Charlton (9) | 13,470 | 16–19 |
| 36 | May 19 | Reds | 7–4 | Henry (1–1) | Wetteland (0–2) | Dibble (6) | 8,760 | 16–20 |
| 37 | May 20 | Reds | 6–5 | Rojas (1–1) | Dibble (0–2) | | 9,651 | 17–20 |
| 38 | May 22 | Braves | 7–1 | Martínez (4–4) | Glavine (6–3) | | 20,313 | 18–20 |
| 39 | May 23 | Braves | 7–6 | Fassero (2–2) | Stanton (0–2) | Wetteland (7) | 15,918 | 19–20 |
| 40 | May 24 | Braves | 2–1 | Smoltz (4–4) | Gardner (3–3) | | 27,682 | 19–21 |
| 41 | May 25 | Astros | 10–8 | Henry (1–4) | C. Haney (2–3) | D. Jones (10) | 5,765 | 19–22 |
| 42 | May 26 | Astros | 9–4 | Boever (1–1) | Nabholz (2–4) | D. Jones (11) | 10,093 | 19–23 |
| 43 | May 27 | Astros | 8–5 | Martínez (5–4) | Portugal (4–2) | Wetteland (8) | 10,110 | 20–23 |
| 44 | May 29 | @ Reds | 3 – 2 (11) | Bankhead (5–1) | Sampen (0–2) | | 12,704 | 20–24 |
| 45 | May 30 | @ Reds | 9–4 | Browning (4–3) | Gardner (3–4) | | 27,226 | 20–25 |
| 46 | May 31 | @ Reds | 6–2 | Nabholz (3–4) | Rijo (1–4) | | 29,954 | 21–25 |

June

| # | Date | Opponent | Score | Win | Loss | Save | Attendance | Record |
|---|---|---|---|---|---|---|---|---|
| 47 | June 1 | @ Astros | 7–1 | Martínez (6–4) | Kile (2–6) | | 7,544 | 22–25 |
| 48 | June 2 | @ Astros | 6–0 | Portugal (5–2) | Sampen (0–3) | | 8,238 | 22–26 |
| 49 | June 3 | @ Astros | 5–3 | Harnisch (3–5) | Hill (4–3) | D. Jones (13) | 8,239 | 22–27 |
| 50 | June 5 | Cubs | 10–4 | Jackson (1–7) | Gardner (3–5) | Scanlan (2) | | 22–28 |
| 51 | June 5 | Cubs | 6–2 | Nabholz (4–4) | Maddux (5–6) | Wetteland (9) | 20,244 | 23–28 |
| 52 | June 7 | Cubs | 3–2 | Fassero (3–2) | Scanlan (1–2) | | 26,511 | 24–28 |
| 53 | June 8 | Mets | 6–0 | Hill (5–3) | Young (2–4) | | 11,132 | 25–28 |
| 54 | June 9 | Mets | 6–5 | Franco (4–0) | Fassero (3–3) | | 12,581 | 25–29 |
| 55 | June 10 | Mets | 8–2 | Gardner (4–5) | Cone (5–4) | | 11,839 | 26–29 |
| 56 | June 12 | @ Cubs | 5–2 | McElroy (3–3) | Martínez (6–5) | Bullinger (3) | 33,483 | 26–30 |
| 57 | June 13 | @ Cubs | 4–3 | Castillo (5–5) | Nabholz (4–5) | Bullinger (4) | 32,857 | 26–31 |
| 58 | June 14 | @ Cubs | 5–1 | Jackson (2–7) | Hill (5–4) | | 31,367 | 26–32 |
| 59 | June 15 | @ Mets | 4–1 | Gardner (5–5) | Young (2–5) | Wetteland (10) | 18,733 | 27–32 |
| 60 | June 16 | @ Mets | 5–2 | Cone (6–4) | Hurst (0–1) | | 18,880 | 27–33 |
| 61 | June 17 | @ Mets | 5–2 | Martínez (7–5) | Fernandez (5–7) | Rojas (2) | 20,269 | 28–33 |
| 62 | June 18 | @ Pirates | 4–0 | Nabholz (5–5) | Palacios (3–2) | Fassero (1) | 20,512 | 29–33 |
| 63 | June 19 | @ Pirates | 2–1 | Hill (6–4) | Drabek (5–5) | Wetteland (11) | 22,091 | 30–33 |
| 64 | June 20 | @ Pirates | 4–3 | Gardner (6–5) | Smith (5–6) | Wetteland (12) | 31,614 | 31–33 |
| 65 | June 21 | @ Pirates | 5–4 | Robinson (2–0) | Martínez (7–6) | Belinda (10) | 20,138 | 31–34 |
| 66 | June 22 | Phillies | 5–3 | Combs (1–0) | Barnes (0–1) | Mitch Williams (15) | 15,157 | 31–35 |
| 67 | June 23 | Phillies | 5–0 | Schilling (6–4) | Nabholz (5–6) | | 30,313 | 31–36 |
| 68 | June 24 | Phillies | 8–1 | Hill (7–4) | Weston (0–1) | | 17,422 | 32–36 |
| 69 | June 25 | Pirates | 6–2 | Martínez (8–6) | Smith (5–7) | Rojas (3) | 23,014 | 33–36 |
| 70 | June 26 | Pirates | 12–4 | Robinson (3–0) | Gardner (6–6) | Belinda (11) | 20,146 | 33–37 |
| 71 | June 27 | Pirates | 9–0 | Barnes (1–1) | Tomlin (10–4) | | 24,793 | 34–37 |
| 72 | June 29 | @ Phillies | 5–4 | Mulholland (8–4) | Fassero (3–4) | Mitch Williams (17) | 27,426 | 34–38 |
| 73 | June 30 | @ Phillies | 7–2 | Hill (8–4) | Mike Williams (0–1) | | 22,282 | 35–38 |

July

| # | Date | Opponent | Score | Win | Loss | Save | Attendance | Record |
|---|---|---|---|---|---|---|---|---|
| 74 | July 1 | @ Phillies | 6–3 | Martínez (9–6) | Abbott (0–10) | Wetteland (13) | 41,222 | 36–38 |
| 75 | July 2 | @ Padres | 3–2 | Gardner (7–6) | Benes (6–6) | Wetteland (14) | 13,859 | 37–38 |
| 76 | July 3 | @ Padres | 6–4 | Seminara (4–2) | Barnes (1–2) | Andersen (1) | 24,476 | 37–39 |
| 77 | July 4 | @ Padres | 3 – 2 (10) | Wetteland (1–2) | Meléndez (5–6) | Rojas (4) | 29,304 | 38–39 |
| 78 | July 5 | @ Padres | 4 – 3 (10) | Rojas (2–1) | Scott (1–1) | | 18,840 | 39–39 |
| 79 | July 6 | @ Dodgers | 8–3 | Kip Gross (1–0) | Martínez (9–7) | | | 39–40 |
| 80 | July 6 | @ Dodgers | 4–3 | Hershiser (7–6) | Fassero (3–5) | Gott (3) | 34,169 | 39–41 |
| 81 | July 7 | @ Dodgers | 4–1 | Gardner (8–6) | Kevin Gross (4–9) | Wetteland (15) | | 40–41 |
| 82 | July 7 | @ Dodgers | 4–0 | Hurst (1–1) | Crews (0–1) | Wetteland (16) | 26,511 | 41–41 |
| 83 | July 8 | @ Dodgers | 1 – 0 (11) | Candiotti (7–7) | Valdez (0–1) | | | 41–42 |
| 84 | July 8 | @ Dodgers | 4–1 | Risley (1–0) | Astacio (1–1) | Rojas (5) | 27,601 | 42–42 |
| 85 | July 9 | @ Giants | 6 – 5 (12) | Wetteland (2–2) | Righetti (1–6) | | 10,299 | 43–42 |
| 86 | July 10 | @ Giants | 3–2 | Hill (9–4) | Wilson (6–9) | Rojas (6) | 12,007 | 44–42 |
| 87 | July 11 | @ Giants | 3–0 | Black (7–2) | Martínez (9–8) | | 23,631 | 44–43 |
| 88 | July 12 | @ Giants | 4–0 | Swift (7–1) | Gardner (8–7) | | 18,597 | 44–44 |
| 89 | July 16 | Padres | 7–4 | Hill (7–4) | Hurst (8–6) | Wetteland (17) | 30,790 | 45–44 |
| 90 | July 17 | Padres | 3–0 | Nabholz (6–6) | Benes (7–8) | Wetteland (18) | 31,123 | 46–44 |
| 91 | July 18 | Padres | 10–3 | Seminara (5–2) | Martínez (9–9) | | 32,370 | 46–45 |
| 92 | July 19 | Padres | 9–2 | Lefferts (11–6) | Gardner (8–8) | | 25,821 | 46–46 |
| 93 | July 20 | Giants | 2–1 | Barnes (2–2) | Rapp (0–1) | Wetteland (19) | 17,315 | 47–46 |
| 94 | July 21 | Giants | 5–1 | Hill (11–4) | Black (8–3) | Rojas (7) | 25,719 | 48–46 |
| 95 | July 22 | Giants | 4–1 | Swift (8–2) | Nabholz (6–7) | | 26,822 | 48–47 |
| 96 | July 24 | Dodgers | 4–3 | Martínez (10–9) | R. Martínez (5–8) | Wetteland (20) | 25,180 | 49–47 |
| 97 | July 25 | Dodgers | 4–1 | Gardner (9–8) | Ojeda (5–5) | Wetteland (21) | 41,935 | 50–47 |
| 98 | July 26 | Dodgers | 4–3 | Rojas (3–1) | Wilson (2–5) | | 46,620 | 51–47 |
| 99 | July 27 | @ Cardinals | 6–4 | Hill (12–4) | Olivares (6–6) | Wetteland (22) | 24,863 | 52–47 |
| 100 | July 28 | @ Cardinals | 7–4 | Fassero (4–5) | Osborne (7–6) | | 24,330 | 53–47 |
| 101 | July 29 | @ Cardinals | 4–1 | L. Smith (3–3) | Martínez (10–10) | | 28,495 | 53–48 |
| 102 | July 30 | Phillies | 7–2 | Gardner (10–8) | Mathews (0–1) | | 28,106 | 54–48 |
| 103 | July 31 | Phillies | 2–0 | Mulholland (11–7) | Barnes (2–3) | | 30,470 | 54–49 |

August

| # | Date | Opponent | Score | Win | Loss | Save | Attendance | Record |
|---|---|---|---|---|---|---|---|---|
| 104 | August 1 | Phillies | 4–2 | Schilling (10–6) | Hill (12–5) | Mitch Williams (20) | 30,511 | 54–50 |
| 105 | August 2 | Phillies | 1–0 | Nabholz (7–7) | Rivera (0–2) | Wetteland (23) | 28,645 | 55–50 |
| 106 | August 3 | Cubs | 3–2 | Martínez (11–10) | Castillo (6–8) | Wetteland (24) | 24,338 | 56–50 |
| 107 | August 4 | Cubs | 8–6 | McElroy (4–6) | Sampen (0–4) | Assenmacher (6) | 31,704 | 56–51 |
| 108 | August 5 | Cubs | 5–3 | Barnes (3–3) | Patterson (1–2) | Wetteland (25) | 23,617 | 57–51 |
| 109 | August 6 | @ Phillies | 7–4 | Hill (13–5) | Schilling (10–7) | Wetteland (26) | 18,848 | 58–51 |
| 110 | August 7 | @ Phillies | 3–1 | Rivera (1–2) | Nabholz (7–8) | Mitch Williams (21) | 22,673 | 58–52 |
| 111 | August 8 | @ Phillies | 6–1 | Martínez (12–10) | Abbott (1–13) | | 26,338 | 59–52 |
| 112 | August 9 | @ Phillies | 6–2 | Gardner (11–8) | Mathews (0–2) | Rojas (8) | 25,683 | 60–52 |
| 113 | August 10 | @ Cubs | 11–0 | Barnes (4–3) | Robinson (2–1) | | 32,911 | 61–52 |
| 114 | August 11 | @ Cubs | 3 – 2 (17) | Sampen (1–4) | Robinson (2–2) | | 31,528 | 62–52 |
| 115 | August 12 | @ Cubs | 3–1 | Nabholz (8–8) | Morgan (10–6) | Rojas (9) | 29,984 | 63–52 |
| 116 | August 14 | Cardinals | 4–1 | Martínez (13–10) | Cormier (3–10) | Wetteland (27) | 36,343 | 64–52 |
| 117 | August 15 | Cardinals | 6–4 | Tewksbury (12–5) | Wetteland (2–3) | L. Smith (29) | 31,185 | 64–53 |
| 118 | August 16 | Cardinals | 5–2 | Osborne (9–6) | Barnes (4–4) | L. Smith (30) | 36,405 | 64–54 |
| 119 | August 18 | Braves | 5–1 | Leibrandt (10–4) | Hill (13–6) | | 32,920 | 64–55 |
| 120 | August 19 | Braves | 4–2 | Glavine (19–3) | Nabholz (8–9) | Stanton (6) | 27,235 | 64–56 |
| 121 | August 20 | Braves | 3–2 | Fassero (5–5) | Peña (1–6) | | 23,896 | 65–56 |
| 122 | August 21 | Reds | 6–3 | Wetteland (3–3) | Belcher (10–12) | | 24,900 | 66–56 |
| 123 | August 22 | Reds | 3–1 | Rojas (4–1) | Swindell (12–6) | Wetteland (28) | 38,200 | 67–56 |
| 124 | August 23 | Reds | 1–0 | Rijo (10–9) | Hill (13–7) | Dibble (16) | 34,998 | 67–57 |
| 125 | August 25 | @ Braves | 6–0 | Nabholz (9–9) | Glavine (19–4) | | 38,455 | 68–57 |
| 126 | August 26 | @ Braves | 5–4 | Martínez (14–10) | Avery (10–9) | Wetteland (29) | 36,275 | 69–57 |
| 127 | August 28 | @ Astros | 8–1 | Harnisch (5–9) | Gardner (11–9) | | 10,629 | 69–58 |
| 128 | August 29 | @ Astros | 8–2 | J. Jones (8–5) | Barnes (4–5) | | 16,657 | 69–59 |
| 129 | August 30 | @ Astros | 4–0 | Hill (14–7) | Kile (2–9) | | 14,939 | 70–59 |
| 130 | August 31 | @ Reds | 8–4 | Rojas (5–1) | Bolton (2–3) | | 17,388 | 71–59 |

September

| # | Date | Opponent | Score | Win | Loss | Save | Attendance | Record |
|---|---|---|---|---|---|---|---|---|
| 131 | September 1 | @ Reds | 5–2 | Martínez (15–10) | Pugh (0–1) | Wetteland (30) | 18,204 | 72–59 |
| 132 | September 2 | @ Reds | 7–3 | Fassero (6–5) | Charlton (3–2) | Wetteland (31) | 14,382 | 73–59 |
| 133 | September 3 | @ Braves | 11–2 | Barnes (5–5) | Leibrandt (11–6) | Bottenfield (1) | 27,824 | 74–59 |
| 134 | September 4 | Astros | 5–2 | Hill (15–7) | J. Jones (8–6) | Wetteland (32) | 25,357 | 75–59 |
| 135 | September 5 | Astros | 5–2 | Kile (3–9) | Nabholz (9–10) | | 28,143 | 75–60 |
| 136 | September 6 | Astros | 3–1 | Henry (6–9) | Martínez (15–11) | D. Jones (31) | 33,311 | 75–61 |
| 137 | September 7 | Cardinals | 8 – 7 (10) | B. Smith (1–0) | Wetteland (3–4) | L. Smith (38) | 21,933 | 75–62 |
| 138 | September 8 | Cardinals | 6–1 | Barnes (6–5) | Clark (3–9) | Rojas (10) | 13,704 | 76–62 |
| 139 | September 9 | Cardinals | 10–3 | Magrane (1–0) | Hill (15–8) | | 16,068 | 76–63 |
| 140 | September 11 | Mets | 4–3 | Fassero (7–5) | Saberhagen (3–4) | Wetteland (33) | 21,252 | 77–63 |
| 141 | September 12 | Mets | 4–1 | Martínez (16–11) | Schourek (5–7) | | 30,691 | 78–63 |
| 142 | September 13 | Mets | 7–5 | Rojas (6–1) | Young (2–12) | | 15,492 | 79–63 |
| 143 | September 14 | @ Phillies | 6–2 | Greene (3–1) | Barnes (6–6) | Shepherd (1) | 12,130 | 79–64 |
| 144 | September 15 | @ Phillies | 3–0 | Hill (16–8) | Schilling (13–10) | Wetteland (34) | 13,799 | 80–64 |
| 145 | September 16 | @ Pirates | 6–3 | Nabholz (10–10) | Walk (9–6) | Wetteland (35) | 37,436 | 81–64 |
| 146 | September 17 | @ Pirates | 3 – 2 (13) | Cox (5–3) | Bottenfield (0–1) | | 20,802 | 81–65 |
| 147 | September 18 | @ Mets | 10–4 | Gardner (12–9) | Gooden (8–13) | | 16,856 | 82–65 |
| 148 | September 19 | @ Mets | 7–5 | Whitehurst (3–8) | Fassero (7–6) | | 21,501 | 82–66 |
| 149 | September 20 | @ Mets | 1–0 | Fernandez (13–10) | Hill (16–9) | | 22,257 | 82–67 |
| 150 | September 21 | Phillies | 9–2 | Rivera (6–4) | Nabholz (10–11) | | 11,596 | 82–68 |
| 151 | September 22 | Phillies | 5–2 | Hartley (6–6) | Bottenfield (0–2) | Mitch Williams (26) | 11,196 | 82–69 |
| 152 | September 23 | Pirates | 5 – 1 (14) | Fassero (8–6) | Mason (5–7) | | 30,552 | 83–69 |
| 153 | September 24 | Pirates | 9–3 | Drabek (15–10) | Krueger (0–1) | | 33,493 | 83–70 |
| 154 | September 25 | Cubs | 4 – 3 (10) | Wetteland (4–4) | Slocumb (0–3) | | 16,873 | 84–70 |
| 155 | September 26 | Cubs | 12–0 | Nabholz (11–11) | Boskie (5–11) | | 26,257 | 85–70 |
| 156 | September 27 | Cubs | 1–0 | Rojas (7–1) | Morgan (15–8) | Wetteland (36) | 41,802 | 86–70 |
| 157 | September 28 | @ Cardinals | 4–1 | Olivares (9–9) | Krueger (0–2) | L. Smith (41) | 12,713 | 86–71 |
| 158 | September 29 | @ Cardinals | 2 – 1 (10) | Pérez (9–3) | Valdez (0–2) | | 13,434 | 86–72 |
| 159 | September 30 | @ Cardinals | 3 – 2 (11) | B. Smith (4–2) | Fassero (8–7) | | 13,627 | 86–73 |

October

| # | Date | Opponent | Score | Win | Loss | Save | Attendance | Record |
|---|---|---|---|---|---|---|---|---|
| 160 | October 2 | @ Cubs | 3–1 | Morgan (16–8) | Nabholz (11–12) | | 15,719 | 86–74 |
| 161 | October 3 | @ Cubs | 3–1 | Bottenfield (1–2) | Bullinger (2–8) | Wetteland (37) | 25,290 | 87–74 |
| 162 | October 4 | @ Cubs | 3–2 | Castillo (10–11) | Gardner (12–10) | Assenmacher (8) | 23,496 | 87–75 |

== Player stats ==
=== Batting ===
==== Starters by position ====
Note: Pos = Position; G = Games played; AB = At bats; H = Hits; Avg. = Batting average; HR = Home runs; RBI = Runs batted in

| Pos | Player | G | AB | H | Avg. | HR | RBI |
|---|---|---|---|---|---|---|---|
| C | Gary Carter | 95 | 285 | 62 | .218 | 5 | 29 |
| 1B | Archi Cianfrocco | 86 | 232 | 56 | .241 | 6 | 30 |
| 2B | Delino DeShields | 135 | 530 | 155 | .292 | 7 | 56 |
| SS | Spike Owen | 122 | 386 | 104 | .269 | 7 | 40 |
| 3B | Tim Wallach | 150 | 537 | 120 | .223 | 9 | 59 |
| LF | Moisés Alou | 115 | 341 | 96 | .282 | 9 | 56 |
| CF | Marquis Grissom | 159 | 653 | 180 | .276 | 14 | 66 |
| RF | Larry Walker | 143 | 528 | 159 | .301 | 23 | 93 |

==== Other batters ====
Note: G = Games played; AB = At bats; H = Hits; Avg. = Batting average; HR = Home runs; RBI = Runs batted in

| Player | G | AB | H | Avg. | HR | RBI |
|---|---|---|---|---|---|---|
| Bret Barberie | 111 | 285 | 66 | .232 | 1 | 24 |
| Darrin Fletcher | 83 | 222 | 54 | .243 | 2 | 26 |
| John Vander Wal | 105 | 213 | 51 | .239 | 4 | 20 |
| Iván Calderón | 48 | 170 | 45 | .265 | 3 | 24 |
| Greg Colbrunn | 52 | 168 | 45 | .268 | 2 | 18 |
| Wil Cordero | 45 | 126 | 38 | .302 | 2 | 8 |
| Tom Foley | 72 | 115 | 20 | .174 | 0 | 5 |
| Darren Reed | 42 | 81 | 14 | .173 | 5 | 10 |
| Rick Cerone | 33 | 63 | 17 | .270 | 1 | 7 |
| Sean Berry | 24 | 57 | 19 | .333 | 1 | 4 |
| Tim Laker | 28 | 46 | 10 | .217 | 0 | 4 |
| Matt Stairs | 13 | 30 | 5 | .167 | 0 | 5 |
| Jerry Willard | 21 | 25 | 3 | .120 | 0 | 1 |
| Steve Lyons | 16 | 13 | 3 | .231 | 0 | 1 |
| Todd Haney | 7 | 10 | 3 | .300 | 0 | 1 |
| Rob Natal | 5 | 6 | 0 | .000 | 0 | 0 |
| Eric Bullock | 8 | 5 | 0 | .000 | 0 | 0 |
| Jerry Goff | 3 | 3 | 0 | .000 | 0 | 0 |

=== Pitching ===
==== Starting pitchers ====
Note: G = Games pitched; IP = Innings pitched; W = Wins; L = Losses; ERA = Earned run average; SO = Strikeouts

| Player | G | IP | W | L | ERA | SO |
|---|---|---|---|---|---|---|
| Dennis Martínez | 32 | 226.1 | 16 | 11 | 2.47 | 147 |
| Ken Hill | 33 | 218.0 | 16 | 9 | 2.68 | 150 |
| Chris Nabholz | 32 | 195.0 | 11 | 12 | 3.32 | 130 |
| Mark Gardner | 33 | 179.2 | 12 | 10 | 4.36 | 132 |
| Brian Barnes | 21 | 100.0 | 6 | 6 | 2.97 | 65 |
| Jonathan Hurst | 3 | 16.1 | 1 | 1 | 5.51 | 4 |
| Bill Risley | 1 | 5.0 | 1 | 0 | 1.80 | 2 |

==== Other pitchers ====
Note: G = Games pitched; IP = Innings pitched; W = Wins; L = Losses; ERA = Earned run average; SO = Strikeouts

| Player | G | IP | W | L | ERA | SO |
|---|---|---|---|---|---|---|
| Chris Haney | 9 | 38.0 | 2 | 3 | 5.45 | 27 |
| Kent Bottenfield | 10 | 32.1 | 1 | 2 | 2.23 | 14 |
| Bill Krueger | 9 | 17.1 | 0 | 2 | 6.75 | 13 |
| Gil Heredia | 7 | 14.2 | 0 | 0 | 1.84 | 7 |

==== Relief pitchers ====
Note: G = Games pitched; W = Wins; L = Losses; SV = Saves; ERA = Earned run average; SO = Strikeouts

| Player | G | W | L | SV | ERA | SO |
|---|---|---|---|---|---|---|
| John Wetteland | 67 | 4 | 4 | 37 | 2.92 | 99 |
| Mel Rojas | 68 | 7 | 1 | 10 | 1.43 | 70 |
| Jeff Fassero | 70 | 8 | 7 | 1 | 2.84 | 63 |
| Bill Sampen | 44 | 1 | 4 | 0 | 3.13 | 23 |
| Sergio Valdez | 27 | 0 | 2 | 0 | 2.41 | 32 |
| Bill Landrum | 18 | 1 | 1 | 0 | 7.20 | 7 |
| Pete Young | 13 | 0 | 0 | 0 | 3.98 | 11 |
| Doug Simons | 7 | 0 | 0 | 0 | 23.63 | 6 |
| Scott Service | 5 | 0 | 0 | 0 | 14.14 | 11 |
| Matt Maysey | 2 | 0 | 0 | 0 | 3.86 | 1 |

== Awards and honors ==
=== National League leaders ===
Offensive statistics

- At bats: Marquis Grissom (653)
- Outs made: Marquis Grissom (505)
- Stolen bases: Marquis Grissom (78)

Defensive statistics

- Assists as right fielder: Larry Walker (16)

=== All-Star Game ===
- Played at Jack Murphy Stadium in San Diego, California
- Selections
  - Larry Walker (1st)
- Home Run Derby participant: Larry Walker

=== Awards ===
- Montreal Expos Player of the Year: Larry Walker
- National League Most Valuable Player Award (MVP) voting results: Walker (5th), Grissom (9th), Delino DeShields (16th)
- Rawlings Gold Glove Award: Larry Walker (outfield)
- Silver Slugger Award: Larry Walker (outfield)

== Farm system ==
| Level | Team | League | Manager |
|---|---|---|---|
| AAA | Indianapolis Indians | American Association | Pat Kelly |
| AA | Harrisburg Senators | Eastern League | Mike Quade |
| A | West Palm Beach Expos | Florida State League | Dave Jauss |
| A | Rockford Expos | Midwest League | Rob Leary |
| A | Albany Polecats | South Atlantic League | Lorenzo Bundy |
| A-Short Season | Jamestown Expos | New York–Penn League | Q. V. Lowe |
| Rookie | GCL Expos | Gulf Coast League | Nelson Norman |
