= 1991 Montreal Expos season =

1991 Montreal Expos
- League: National League
- Division: East
- Ballpark: Olympic Stadium
- City: Montreal
- Record: 71–90
- Divisional place: 6th
- Owners: Claude Brochu
- General managers: Dave Dombrowski
- Managers: Buck Rodgers, Tom Runnells
- Television: CBC Television/CTV Television Network (Dave Van Horne, Ken Singleton); Télévision de Radio-Canada (Claude Raymond, Raymond Lebrun); The Sports Network (Ken Singleton, Dave Van Horne); RDS Network (Denis Casavant, Rodger Brulotte)
- Radio: CFCF (English) (Dave Van Horne, Bobby Winkles, Ken Singleton, Elliott Price); CKAC (French) (Jacques Doucet, Rodger Brulotte, Pierre Arsenault)

The 1991 Montreal Expos season was the 23rd season in franchise history. After several winning seasons, the Expos faltered in 1991, winning only 20 of its first 49 games. Manager Buck Rodgers was replaced as manager by Tom Runnells. The team ultimately finished 71–90. The highlight of the season was Dennis Martinez pitching a perfect game at Dodger Stadium on July 28, 1991.

== Offseason ==
- November 15, 1990: Scott Service was signed as a free agent by the Expos.
- December 3, 1990: Rolando Roomes was released by the Expos.
- December 23, 1990: Tim Raines, Jeff Carter, and a player to be named later were traded by the Expos to the Chicago White Sox for Iván Calderón and Barry Jones. The Expos completed the deal by sending Mario Brito to the White Sox on February 15, 1991.
- February 15, 1991: Ron Hassey signed as a free agent by the Expos.
- February 27, 1991: Rick Mahler signed as a free agent by the Expos.
- March 30, 1991: Mike Aldrete was released by the Expos.

== Spring training ==
The Expos held spring training at West Palm Beach Municipal Stadium in West Palm Beach, Florida – a facility they shared with the Atlanta Braves. It was their 15th season at the stadium; they had conducted spring training there from 1969 to 1972 and since 1981.

== Regular season ==
On May 23, 1991, the Expos were no-hit by the Phillies' Tommy Greene. Greene was starting for only the second time in the season and 15th time in his major league career, and was pitching in place of Danny Cox who had suffered a pulled groin in his last start. Greene became the first visiting pitcher to hurl a no-hitter in Montreal's history as the Phillies defeated the Expos, 2–0 before an Olympic Stadium crowd of 8,833.

- July 26, 1991: Mark Gardner pitched 9 innings of no-hit baseball against the Los Angeles Dodgers at Dodger Stadium. It was tied at 0–0 in the tenth; however, versatile utility man Lenny Harris singled for the Dodgers breaking it up.
- July 28, 1991: In a 2–0 victory, Dennis Martínez pitched a perfect game against the Los Angeles Dodgers at Dodger Stadium. The final out was recorded by Marquis Grissom in center field off a lazy fly ball off the bat of Chris Gwynn. Dennis shut out the Dodgers in his previous meeting with them on April 30, 1991, the perfect game marked the 25th straight inning the Dodgers failed to score a run off him.
- September 8, 1991: The Expos had to play their last 13 home games on the road, due to a concrete beam from Olympic Stadium's roof collapsing on September 13.

=== Season standings ===
NL East
| Team | W | L | Pct. | GB | Home | Road |
|---|---|---|---|---|---|---|
| Pittsburgh Pirates | 98 | 64 | .605 | — | 52‍–‍32 | 46‍–‍32 |
| St. Louis Cardinals | 84 | 78 | .519 | 14 | 52‍–‍32 | 32‍–‍46 |
| Philadelphia Phillies | 78 | 84 | .481 | 20 | 47‍–‍36 | 31‍–‍48 |
| Chicago Cubs | 77 | 83 | .481 | 20 | 46‍–‍37 | 31‍–‍46 |
| New York Mets | 77 | 84 | .478 | 20½ | 40‍–‍42 | 37‍–‍42 |
| Montreal Expos | 71 | 90 | .441 | 26½ | 33‍–‍35 | 38‍–‍55 |

=== Record vs. opponents ===
1991 National League record Sources:
| Team | ATL | CHC | CIN | HOU | LAD | MON | NYM | PHI | PIT | SD | SF | STL |
|---|---|---|---|---|---|---|---|---|---|---|---|---|
| Atlanta | — | 6–6 | 11–7 | 13–5 | 7–11 | 5–7 | 9–3 | 5–7 | 9–3 | 11–7 | 9–9 | 9–3 |
| Chicago | 6–6 | — | 4–8 | 9–3 | 2–10 | 10–7 | 11–6 | 8–10 | 7–11 | 4–8 | 6–6 | 10–8 |
| Cincinnati | 7–11 | 8–4 | — | 9–9 | 6–12 | 6–6 | 5–7 | 9–3 | 2–10 | 8–10 | 10–8 | 4–8 |
| Houston | 5–13 | 3–9 | 9–9 | — | 8–10 | 2–10 | 7–5 | 7–5 | 4–8 | 6–12 | 9–9 | 5–7 |
| Los Angeles | 11–7 | 10–2 | 12–6 | 10–8 | — | 5–7 | 7–5 | 7–5 | 7–5 | 10–8 | 8–10 | 6–6 |
| Montreal | 7–5 | 7–10 | 6–6 | 10–2 | 7–5 | — | 4–14 | 4–14 | 6–12 | 6–6 | 7–5 | 7–11 |
| New York | 3–9 | 6–11 | 7–5 | 5–7 | 5–7 | 14–4 | — | 11–7 | 6–12 | 7–5 | 6–6 | 7–11 |
| Philadelphia | 7-5 | 10–8 | 3–9 | 5–7 | 5–7 | 14–4 | 7–11 | — | 6–12 | 9–3 | 6–6 | 6–12 |
| Pittsburgh | 3–9 | 11–7 | 10–2 | 8–4 | 5–7 | 12–6 | 12–6 | 12–6 | — | 7–5 | 7–5 | 11–7 |
| San Diego | 7–11 | 8–4 | 10–8 | 12–6 | 8–10 | 6–6 | 5–7 | 3–9 | 5–7 | — | 11–7 | 9–3 |
| San Francisco | 9–9 | 6–6 | 8–10 | 9–9 | 10–8 | 5–7 | 6–6 | 6–6 | 5–7 | 7–11 | — | 4–8 |
| St. Louis | 3–9 | 8–10 | 8–4 | 7–5 | 6–6 | 11–7 | 11–7 | 12–6 | 7–11 | 3–9 | 8–4 | — |

=== Opening Day starters ===
- Oil Can Boyd
- Iván Calderón
- Delino DeShields
- Andrés Galarraga
- Dave Martinez
- Spike Owen
- Gilberto Reyes
- Larry Walker
- Tim Wallach

=== Notable transactions ===
- April 1, 1991: Otis Nixon and Boi Rodriguez (minors) were traded by the Expos to the Atlanta Braves for Jimmy Kremers and a player to be named later. The Braves completed the deal by sending Keith Morrison to the Expos on June 3.
- June 3: 1991 Major League Baseball draft
  - Cliff Floyd was drafted by the Expos in the 1st round (14th pick). He signed on June 15.
  - Kirk Rueter was drafted by the Expos in the 18th round. He signed on June 21.
- June 4: Kenny Williams was selected off waivers by the Expos from the Toronto Blue Jays.
- June 10: Rick Mahler was released by the Expos.
- July 15: Tim Burke was traded by the Expos to the New York Mets for Ron Darling and Mike Thomas.
- July 19: Scott Service was purchased from the Expos by the Chunichi Dragons.
- July 21: Oil Can Boyd was traded by the Expos to the Texas Rangers for Jonathan Hurst, Joey Eischen, and a player to be named later. The Rangers completed the deal by sending Travis Buckley to the Expos on September 1.
- July 31, 1991: Ron Darling was traded by the Expos to the Oakland Athletics for Matt Grott and Russell Cormier (minors).

=== The Perfect Game ===
On July 28, 1991, Dennis Martínez became the first Latin-born pitcher to throw a perfect game, the 13th in major league history, against the Los Angeles Dodgers.

==== Scorecard ====
July 28, Dodger Stadium, Chávez Ravine, California

| Team | 1 | 2 | 3 | 4 | 5 | 6 | 7 | 8 | 9 | R | H | E |
|---|---|---|---|---|---|---|---|---|---|---|---|---|
| Montreal | 0 | 0 | 0 | 0 | 0 | 0 | 2 | 0 | 0 | 2 | 4 | 0 |
| Los Angeles | 0 | 0 | 0 | 0 | 0 | 0 | 0 | 0 | 0 | 0 | 0 | 2 |
W: Dennis Martínez L: Mike Morgan
HRs: None, Attendance: 45,560; Length of game: 2:14. Umpires: HP: Larry Poncino, 1B: Bruce Froemming, 2B: Dana DeMuth, 3B: Greg Bonin

=== Roster ===
1991 Montreal Expos
Roster
| Pitchers: 47 Brian Barnes; 23 Oil Can Boyd; 44 Tim Burke; 15 Ron Darling; 39 Jeff Fassero; 41 Steve Frey; 28 Mark Gardner; 42 Chris Haney; 50 Barry Jones; 48 Bill Long; 42 Rick Mahler; 32 Dennis Martínez; 43 Chris Nabholz; 48 Doug Piatt; 51 Mel Rojas; 34 Scott Ruskin; 55 Bill Sampen; 26 Dave Schmidt; 40 Dave Wainhouse | Catchers: 20 Mike Fitzgerald; 24 Ron Hassey; 2 Gilberto Reyes; 26 Nelson Santovenia; Infielders: 25 Bret Barberie; 4 Delino DeShields; 16 Tom Foley; 14 Andrés Galarraga; 11 Spike Owen; 29 Tim Wallach | Outfielders: 38 Eric Bullock; 22 Iván Calderón; 9 Marquis Grissom; 1 Dave Martinez; 3 Junior Noboa; 6 Nikco Riesgo; 23 John Vander Wal; 33 Larry Walker; 44,12 Kenny Williams | Manager: 37 Buck Rodgers (Fired on June 2, 1991); 10 Tom Runnells (Promoted on June 2, 1991); Coaches: 36 Larry Bearnarth (Pitching); 21 Tommy Harper (First Base); 17 Rafael Landestoy (Bench); 31 Ken Macha (Bullpen); 6 Jerry Manuel (Third Base) (Hired on June 2, 1991); 12 Hal McRae (Hitting) (Fired on June 2, 1991); 10 Tom Runnells (Third Base) (Promoted to Manager on June 2, 1991); 35 Jay Ward (Hitting) (Hired on June 2, 1991) |

== Player stats ==
=== Batting ===
==== Starters by position ====
Note: Pos = Position; G = Games played; AB = At bats; H = Hits; Avg. = Batting average; HR = Home runs; RBI = Runs batted in

| Pos | Player | G | AB | H | Avg. | HR | RBI |
|---|---|---|---|---|---|---|---|
| C | Gilberto Reyes | 83 | 207 | 45 | .217 | 0 | 13 |
| 1B | Andrés Galarraga | 107 | 375 | 82 | .219 | 9 | 33 |
| 2B | Delino DeShields | 151 | 563 | 134 | .238 | 10 | 51 |
| 3B | Tim Wallach | 151 | 577 | 130 | .225 | 13 | 73 |
| SS | Spike Owen | 139 | 424 | 108 | .255 | 3 | 26 |
| LF | Iván Calderón | 134 | 470 | 141 | .300 | 19 | 75 |
| CF | Marquis Grissom | 148 | 558 | 149 | .267 | 6 | 39 |
| RF | Larry Walker | 137 | 487 | 141 | .290 | 16 | 64 |

==== Other batters ====
Note: G = Games played; AB = At bats; H = Hits; Avg. = Batting average; HR = Home runs; RBI = Runs batted in

| Player | G | AB | H | Avg. | HR | RBI |
|---|---|---|---|---|---|---|
| Dave Martinez | 124 | 396 | 117 | .295 | 7 | 42 |
| Mike Fitzgerald | 71 | 198 | 40 | .202 | 4 | 28 |
| Tom Foley | 86 | 168 | 35 | .208 | 0 | 15 |
| Bret Barberie | 57 | 136 | 48 | .353 | 2 | 18 |
| Ron Hassey | 52 | 119 | 27 | .227 | 1 | 14 |
| Nelson Santovenia | 41 | 96 | 24 | .250 | 2 | 14 |
| Junior Noboa | 67 | 95 | 23 | .242 | 1 | 2 |
| Eric Bullock | 73 | 72 | 16 | .222 | 1 | 6 |
| Kenny Williams | 34 | 70 | 19 | .271 | 0 | 1 |
| John Vander Wal | 21 | 61 | 13 | .213 | 1 | 8 |
| Nikco Riesgo | 4 | 7 | 1 | .143 | 0 | 0 |

=== Pitching ===
==== Starting pitchers ====
Note: G = Games pitched; IP = Innings pitched; W = Wins; L = Losses; ERA = Earned run average; SO = Strikeouts

| Player | G | IP | W | L | ERA | SO |
|---|---|---|---|---|---|---|
| Dennis Martínez | 31 | 222.0 | 14 | 11 | 2.39 | 123 |
| Mark Gardner | 27 | 168.1 | 9 | 11 | 3.85 | 107 |
| Brian Barnes | 28 | 160.0 | 5 | 8 | 4.22 | 117 |
| Chris Nabholz | 24 | 153.2 | 8 | 7 | 3.63 | 99 |
| Oil Can Boyd | 19 | 120.1 | 6 | 8 | 3.52 | 82 |
| Chris Haney | 16 | 84.2 | 3 | 7 | 4.04 | 51 |
| Ron Darling | 3 | 17.0 | 0 | 2 | 7.41 | 11 |

==== Other pitchers ====
Note: G = Games pitched; IP = Innings pitched; W = Wins; L = Losses; ERA = Earned run average; SO = Strikeouts

| Player | G | IP | W | L | ERA | SO |
|---|---|---|---|---|---|---|
| Bill Sampen | 43 | 92.1 | 9 | 5 | 4.00 | 52 |
| Rick Mahler | 10 | 37.1 | 1 | 3 | 3.62 | 17 |

==== Relief pitchers ====
Note: G = Games pitched; W = Wins; L = Losses; SV = Saves; ERA = Earned run average; SO = Strikeouts

| Player | G | W | L | SV | ERA | SO |
|---|---|---|---|---|---|---|
| Barry Jones | 77 | 4 | 9 | 13 | 3.35 | 46 |
| Scott Ruskin | 64 | 4 | 4 | 6 | 4.24 | 46 |
| Jeff Fassero | 51 | 2 | 5 | 8 | 2.44 | 42 |
| Mel Rojas | 37 | 3 | 3 | 6 | 3.75 | 37 |
| Tim Burke | 37 | 3 | 4 | 5 | 4.11 | 25 |
| Steve Frey | 31 | 0 | 1 | 1 | 4.99 | 21 |
| Doug Piatt | 21 | 0 | 0 | 0 | 2.60 | 29 |
| Dave Schmidt | 4 | 0 | 1 | 0 | 10.38 | 3 |
| Bill Long | 3 | 0 | 0 | 0 | 10.80 | 0 |
| Dave Wainhouse | 2 | 0 | 1 | 0 | 6.75 | 1 |

== Award winners ==
- Marquis Grissom, National League Stolen Base Leader, 76
- Dennis Martínez, National League ERA Champion, 2.39
- Dennis Martínez, Pitcher of the Month, July

=== All-Stars ===
1991 Major League Baseball All-Star Game

- Iván Calderón, outfield, starter
- Dennis Martínez, reserve

== Farm system ==
| Level | Team | League | Manager |
|---|---|---|---|
| AAA | Indianapolis Indians | American Association | Jerry Manuel and Pat Kelly |
| AA | Harrisburg Senators | Eastern League | Mike Quade |
| A | West Palm Beach Expos | Florida State League | Felipe Alou |
| A | Rockford Expos | Midwest League | Pat Kelly and Rob Leary |
| A | Sumter Flyers | South Atlantic League | Lorenzo Bundy |
| A-Short Season | Jamestown Expos | New York–Penn League | Ed Creech |
| Rookie | GCL Expos | Gulf Coast League | Keith Snider |

League Champions: West Palm Beach, Jamestown, GCL Expos
