= 1992 Chicago Cubs season =

1992 Chicago Cubs
- League: National League
- Division: East
- Ballpark: Wrigley Field
- City: Chicago
- Record: 78–84 (.481)
- Divisional place: 4th
- Owners: Tribune Company
- General managers: Larry Himes
- Managers: Jim Lefebvre
- Television: WGN-TV/Superstation WGN (Harry Caray, Steve Stone, Thom Brennaman)
- Radio: WGN (Thom Brennaman, Ron Santo, Harry Caray)
- Stats: ESPN.com; Baseball Reference

The 1992 Chicago Cubs season was the 121st season of the Chicago Cubs franchise, the 117th in the National League and the 77th at Wrigley Field. The Cubs finished fourth in the National League East with a record of 78–84.

== Offseason ==
- March 30, 1992: George Bell was traded by the Cubs to the Chicago White Sox for Sammy Sosa and Ken Patterson.

== Regular season ==
=== Season standings ===
NL East
Team	W	L	Pct.	GB	Home	Road
Pittsburgh Pirates	96	66	.593	—	53‍–‍28	43‍–‍38
Montreal Expos	87	75	.537	9	43‍–‍38	44‍–‍37
St. Louis Cardinals	83	79	.512	13	45‍–‍36	38‍–‍43
Chicago Cubs	78	84	.481	18	43‍–‍38	35‍–‍46
New York Mets	72	90	.444	24	41‍–‍40	31‍–‍50
Philadelphia Phillies	70	92	.432	26	41‍–‍40	29‍–‍52

=== Record vs. opponents ===
1992 National League record Sources:
Team	ATL	CHC	CIN	HOU	LAD	MON	NYM	PHI	PIT	SD	SF	STL
Atlanta	—	10–2	9–9	13–5	12–6	4–8	7–5	6–6	7–5	13–5	11–7	6–6
Chicago	2–10	—	5–7	8–4	6–6	7–11	9–9	9–9	8–10	5–7	8–4	11–7
Cincinnati	9–9	7–5	—	10–8	11–7	5–7	7–5	7–5	6–6	11–7	10–8	7–5
Houston	5–13	4–8	8–10	—	13–5	8–4	5–7	8–4	6–6	7–11	12–6	5–7
Los Angeles	6–12	6–6	7–11	5–13	—	4–8	5–7	5–7	5–7	9–9	7–11	4–8
Montreal	8–4	11–7	7–5	4–8	8–4	—	12–6	9–9	9–9	8–4	5–7	6–12
New York	5–7	9–9	5–7	7–5	7–5	6–12	—	6–12	4–14	4–8	10–2	9–9
Philadelphia	6-6	9–9	5–7	4–8	7–5	9–9	12–6	—	5–13	3–9	3–9	7–11
Pittsburgh	5–7	10–8	6–6	6–6	7–5	9–9	14–4	13–5	—	5–7	6–6	15–3
San Diego	5–13	7–5	7–11	11–7	9–9	4–8	8–4	9–3	7–5	—	11–7	4–8
San Francisco	7–11	4–8	8–10	6–12	11–7	7–5	2–10	9–3	6–6	7–11	—	5–7
St. Louis	6–6	7–11	5–7	7–5	8–4	12–6	9–9	11–7	3–15	8–4	7–5	—

=== Notable transactions ===
- July 7, 1992: Ced Landrum was traded by the Cubs to the Milwaukee Brewers for Jeff Kunkel.

== Roster ==
1992 Chicago Cubs
Roster
Pitchers: 45 Paul Assenmacher; 47 Shawn Boskie; 52 Jim Bullinger; 49 Frank Castillo; 22 Mike Harkey; 44 Jeff Hartsock; 32 Jessie Hollins; 32 Danny Jackson; 31 Greg Maddux; 35 Chuck McElroy; 35 Mike Morgan; 34 Ken Patterson; 48 Dennis Rasmussen; 38 Jeff Robinson; 30 Bob Scanlan; 51 Heathcliff Slocumb; 42 Dave Smith	Catchers: 7 Joe Girardi; 53 Jorge Pedre; 19 Héctor Villanueva; 2 Rick Wilkins; Infielders: 24,50 Alex Arias; 24 Steve Buechele; 12 Shawon Dunston; 17 Mark Grace; 11 Jeff Kunkel; 10 Luis Salazar; 6 Rey Sánchez; 23 Ryne Sandberg; 25 Gary Scott; 1 Doug Strange; 16 José Vizcaíno	Outfielders: 28 Kal Daniels; 29 Doug Dascenzo; 8 Andre Dawson; 27 Derrick May; 40 Fernando Ramsey; 18 Dwight Smith; 21 Sammy Sosa; 24 Chico Walker; 20 Jerome Walton	Manager: 5 Jim Lefebvre; Coaches: 38 Billy Connors (pitching); 15 Chuck Cottier (third base); 3 José Martínez (first base); 41 Tom Trebelhorn (bench); 26 Billy Williams (hitting); 46 Sammy Ellis (bullpen)

== Player stats ==
= Indicates team leader

=== Batting ===
==== Starters by position ====
Note: Pos = Position; G = Games played; AB = At bats; H = Hits; Avg. = Batting average; HR = Home runs; RBI = Runs batted in

Pos.	Player	G	AB	H	Avg.	HR	RBI
C	Joe Girardi	91	270	73	.270	1	12
1B	Mark Grace	158	603	185	.307	9	79
2B	Ryne Sandberg	158	612	186	.304	26	87
3B	Steve Buechele	65	239	66	.276	1	21
SS	Rey Sánchez	74	255	64	.251	1	19
LF	Derrick May	124	351	96	.274	8	45
CF	Doug Dascenzo	139	376	96	.255	0	20
RF	Andre Dawson	143	542	150	.277	22	90

==== Other batters ====
Note: G = Games played; AB = At bats; H = Hits; Avg. = Batting average; HR = Home runs; RBI = Runs batted in

Player	G	AB	H	Avg.	HR	RBI
José Vizcaíno	86	285	64	.225	1	17
Sammy Sosa	67	262	68	.260	8	25
Luis Salazar	98	255	53	.208	5	25
Rick Wilkins	83	244	66	.270	8	22
Dwight Smith	109	217	60	.276	3	24
Héctor Villanueva	51	112	17	.152	2	13
Kal Daniels	48	108	27	.250	4	17
Alex Arias	32	99	29	.293	0	7
Gary Scott	36	96	15	.156	2	11
Doug Strange	52	94	15	.160	1	5
Shawon Dunston	18	73	23	.315	0	2
Jerome Walton	30	55	7	.127	0	1
Jeff Kunkel	20	29	4	.138	0	1
Chico Walker	19	26	3	.115	0	2
Fernando Ramsey	18	25	3	.120	0	2
Jorge Pedre	4	4	0	.000	0	0

=== Pitching ===
= Indicates league leader

==== Starting pitchers ====
Note: G = Games pitched; IP = Innings pitched; W = Wins; L = Losses; ERA = Earned run average; SO = Strikeouts

Player	G	IP	W	L	ERA	SO
Greg Maddux	35	268.0	20	11	2.18	199
Mike Morgan	34	240.0	16	8	2.55	123
Frank Castillo	33	205.1	10	11	3.46	135
Danny Jackson	19	113.0	4	9	4.22	51
Shawn Boskie	23	91.2	5	11	5.01	39
Mike Harkey	7	38.0	4	0	1.89	21

==== Other pitchers ====
Note: G = Games pitched; IP = Innings pitched; W = Wins; L = Losses; ERA = Earned run average; SO = Strikeouts

Player	G	IP	W	L	ERA	SO
Jim Bullinger	39	85.0	2	8	4.66	36
Dennis Rasmussen	3	5.0	0	0	10.80	0

==== Relief pitchers ====
Note: G = Games pitched; W = Wins; L = Losses; SV = Saves; ERA = Earned run average; SO = Strikeouts

Player	G	W	L	SV	ERA	SO
Bob Scanlan	69	3	6	14	2.89	42
Chuck McElroy	72	4	7	6	3.55	83
Paul Assenmacher	70	4	4	8	4.10	67
Jeff Robinson	49	4	3	1	3.00	46
Ken Patterson	32	2	3	0	3.89	23
Heathcliff Slocumb	30	0	3	1	6.50	27
Dave Smith	11	0	0	0	2.51	3
Jeff Hartsock	4	0	0	0	6.75	6
Jessie Hollins	4	0	0	0	13.50	0

== Farm system ==
Level	Team	League	Manager
AAA	Iowa Cubs	American Association	Brad Mills
AA	Charlotte Knights	Southern League	Marv Foley
A	Winston-Salem Spirits	Carolina League	Bill Hayes
A	Peoria Chiefs	Midwest League	Steve Roadcap
A-Short Season	Geneva Cubs	New York–Penn League	Greg Mahlberg
Rookie	Huntington Cubs	Appalachian League	Phil Hannon
Rookie	AZL Cubs/Rockies	Arizona League	Paul Zuvella

LEAGUE CHAMPIONS: Geneva
AZL club affiliation shared with Colorado Rockies
