= Ron Gideon =

American baseball player and coach (born 1964)

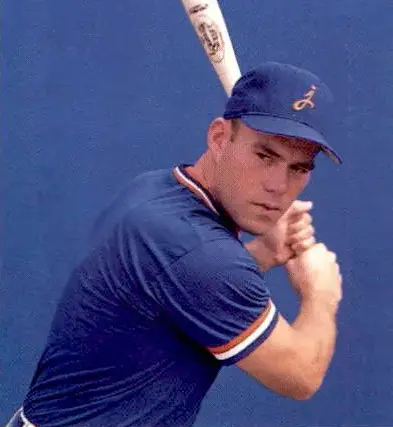
- Gideon with the Jackson Mets c. 1988
- Coach
- Born: January 13, 1964 (age 62); Tyler, Texas, U.S.
- Bats: Left Throws: Left
- Stats at Baseball Reference

Teams
- As coach: Colorado Rockies (2017–2026)

Ronnie Dwayne Gideon (born January 13, 1964) is an American former professional baseball coach. He served as the first base coach for the Colorado Rockies of Major League Baseball (MLB) from 2019 to 2026.

== Career ==
In his playing days (1984–90), Gideon was a first baseman and pitcher in the minor league organizations of the Philadelphia Phillies and New York Mets. He batted .250 over his career—slugging 25 home runs in his best season, 1987 with the Single–A Lynchburg Mets—and losing four of five decisions with an earned run average of 2.97 on the mound. He threw and batted left-handed, standing 6 feet 2 inches (1.88 m) tall and weighing 200 pounds (91 kg).

Gideon became a coach and instructor in the Mets' system after his retirement as a player, and managed in the minor leagues from 1993 to 2005, joining the Rockies' system in 1996. He managed at every level but Triple-A before moving to the field coordinator of instruction post for the Rockies in 2006. On May 29, 2009, Gideon was also named manager of the Tulsa Drillers of the Double-A Texas League, part of a chain reaction of promotions in the Rockies' organization that followed the firing of Colorado pilot Clint Hurdle. Hurdle was replaced by Jim Tracy as Colorado's MLB manager, Triple-A skipper Tom Runnells became Tracy's bench coach, Tulsa manager Stu Cole took over Runnells' Colorado Springs Sky Sox, and Gideon took the reins in Tulsa.

During the 2010 baseball season, Gideon continued to hold the twin posts of Tulsa manager and field coordinator, but was strictly the Rockies' field coordinator in 2011–12. In 2013, he was named the "development supervisor " of the Rockies' Low–A affiliate, the Tri-City Dust Devils. In February 2013, the Rockies announced an innovation to their minor league system, appointing a development supervisor at all levels of their organization; Gideon's role as player development supervisor was to "work with the manager, staffs and players to make sure that the Rockies' development philosophies are being carried out and communication and team building take place." Gideon was promoted to the major league coaching staff in 2017. He became the Rockies' first base coach prior to the 2019 season. On November 2, 2026, it was reported that Gideon would be retiring from his position.

== Personal life ==
Gideon now lives in Hallsville, Texas with his family. He has been married to his wife Kim since 1986. He has 3 children, Shelby Dawson married to Kevin, Bailey Benge married to Dylan, and Ronnie Jr. married to Mikayla. He has 7 grandchildren: Luke, Katie, Brooklyn, Baylor, Blakely, Owen and Whitten.

| Preceded by Stu Cole | Tulsa Drillers Manager; 2009–2010 | Succeeded by Duane Espy |
