= John Wetteland =

American baseball player (born 1966)

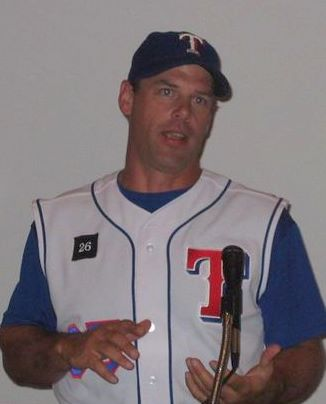
- Wetteland in 2005
- Pitcher
- Born: August 21, 1966 (age 60); San Mateo, California, U.S.
- Batted: Right Threw: Right

MLB debut
- May 31, 1989, for the Los Angeles Dodgers

Last MLB appearance
- September 20, 2000, for the Texas Rangers

MLB statistics
- Win–loss record: 48–45
- Earned run average: 2.97
- Strikeouts: 804
- Saves: 330
- Stats at Baseball Reference

Teams
- As player: Los Angeles Dodgers (1989–1991); Montreal Expos (1992–1994); New York Yankees (1995–1996); Texas Rangers (1997–2000); As coach: Washington Nationals (2006); Seattle Mariners (2009–2010)

Career highlights and awards
- 3× All-Star (1996, 1998, 1999); World Series champion (1996); World Series MVP (1996); AL Rolaids Relief Man Award (1996); AL saves leader (1996); Texas Rangers Hall of Fame

John Karl Wetteland (born August 21, 1966) is an American former professional baseball pitcher who played 12 seasons in Major League Baseball (MLB). He pitched for four teams: the Los Angeles Dodgers, Montreal Expos, New York Yankees, and Texas Rangers. A relief pitcher, Wetteland specialized as a closer, recording 330 saves during his career. In the 1996 season, Wetteland had a streak of 24 straight appearances in which he recorded a save, the most in MLB history, breaking the record of 19 set by Lee Smith the season before. With the Yankees, he won the 1996 World Series over the Atlanta Braves and won the World Series Most Valuable Player Award for saving four games in the series.

After his playing career, he served as a coach for the Washington Nationals and Seattle Mariners. In 2019, Wetteland was arrested and indicted on charges of sexually abusing a child under the age of 14. These charges were later dismissed.

== Playing career ==
Wetteland attended Cardinal Newman High School in Santa Rosa, California. The New York Mets selected him in the 12th round of the 1984 MLB draft, but he opted not to sign, feeling he was not ready for a professional career. He enrolled at the College of San Mateo. The Los Angeles Dodgers selected Wetteland as their second choice in the secondary phase of the 1985 MLB draft, and he signed with Los Angeles.

In 1986, Wetteland played for the Bakersfield Dodgers of the Class A California League, but struggled, pitching to a 0–7 win–loss record in 15 games, and was demoted to the Great Falls Dodgers of the Rookie-level Pioneer League. The Detroit Tigers selected Wetteland from the Dodgers in the 1987 Rule 5 draft, but was returned to the Dodgers during spring training in 1988, when they chose to carry Jim Walewander with their final roster spot. In 1988, Wetteland pitched for the San Antonio Missions of the Class AA Texas League. While playing in the Pacific Coast League, he garnered notice by earning 20 saves in 20 chances. He made his major league debut on May 31, 1989. After struggling with his first five starts in 1990, Wetteland asked to become a relief pitcher.

After the 1991 season, Wetteland was traded twice; first to the Cincinnati Reds with Tim Belcher for Eric Davis and Kip Gross in November, and then to the Montreal Expos with Bill Risley for Dave Martinez, Scott Ruskin, and Willie Greene in December. In 1992, he became the Expos' closer. On April 5, 1995, the Expos traded Wetteland to the New York Yankees for Fernando Seguignol.

During the 1996 season, he led the American League in saves, totaling 43, and appeared in the All-Star Game. During the 1996 World Series, Wetteland recorded four saves and the Yankees won the World Series against the Atlanta Braves in six games. Wetteland won the World Series Most Valuable Player Award, recording the maximum four saves possible during the Series, tying the record for the most saves in a single postseason series (Dennis Eckersley first did it in the 1988 ALCS; since then, Greg Holland matched it in the 2014 ALCS), and setting a record for saves in the full postseason, with 7 (since then, Robb Nen, Troy Percival, Brad Lidge, Koji Uehara, and Holland, share this record). He was awarded with the 1996 Rolaids Relief Man Award.

The Yankees allowed Wetteland to leave as a free agent due to the emergence of Mariano Rivera. He joined the Texas Rangers on December 16, 1996, signing a four-year contract worth $23 million. Before the 1999 season, Wetteland underwent elbow surgery. The surgery robbed him of some of his fastball speed, forcing him to expand his repertoire to include a slider, curveball, and change-up. Wetteland was again named to the All-Star team for the 1999 season, where he pitched a scoreless 9th inning, and became the first Rangers pitcher to earn an All-Star save. His 43 saves that year set a new Rangers record. His final game was on September 20, 2000, and he retired at age 33 after his Rangers contract expired during the 2000 offseason.

Wetteland was awarded the Rolaids Reliever of the Decade after earning the most saves of any pitcher during the 1990s. He is also the Rangers all-time saves leader with 150. His final win/loss percentage was .516, with 48 wins and 45 losses.

In 2005, Wetteland was inducted into the Texas Rangers Hall of Fame.

== Coaching career ==
The Washington Nationals hired Wetteland as their bullpen coach on January 27, 2006. However, on June 15, 2006, Wetteland was relieved of his duties due to a request from manager Frank Robinson, due to a "long line of transgressions and insubordination". He was offered another position within the organization.

Wetteland was announced as the bullpen coach for the Seattle Mariners on December 3, 2008. He served in this position until after the end of the 2010 season, when new manager Eric Wedge replaced him with Triple-A Tacoma Rainiers pitching coach Jaime Navarro.

== Personal life ==
Wetteland grew up in a log cabin in Sebastopol, California. His father, Ed, played baseball in the Chicago Cubs organization. Wetteland and his ex-wife Michele met while he was playing for San Antonio in 1988. Through his relationship with Michelle, who became a born-again Christian at age six, Wetteland also became born again. They separated in 2014. Their divorce by state decree was final in 2015. They have four children.

On May 18, 2007, Wetteland was introduced as an assistant baseball coach and bible teacher at Liberty Christian School in Argyle, Texas.

On November 12, 2009, Wetteland was hospitalized for what was originally said to be a "mental issue," in which a woman reported he was depressed and contemplating suicide. In subsequent statements upon Wetteland's release the same night, Wetteland and the Seattle Mariners indicated that the cause of the hospitalization was "because of an extremely high heart rate" linked to high blood pressure.

On January 15, 2019, Wetteland was arrested in Texas on child sex abuse charges due to allegations of "continuous sexual abuse of a child under the age of 14." Wetteland was accused of abusing a male relative between the ages of four and six by forcing him to perform a sex act on Wetteland on three occasions, between October 2004 and October 2006. Wetteland was released from jail on $25,000 bond. A grand jury in Denton County, Texas indicted him on the charges in March. The trial started on August 29, 2022, and on September 2, 2022, a mistrial was declared after the jury became deadlocked. All charges were dropped on March 27, 2023, as the prosecution concluded a second trial was unlikely to result in a conviction.

== See also ==
- List of Major League Baseball annual saves leaders

Sporting positions
Preceded by Bob Natal	Washington Nationals bullpen coach 2006	Succeeded by Randy Knorr
Preceded by Norm Charlton	Seattle Mariners bullpen coach 2009–2010	Succeeded by Jaime Navarro
