= Jorge Pedre =

American baseball player (born 1966)

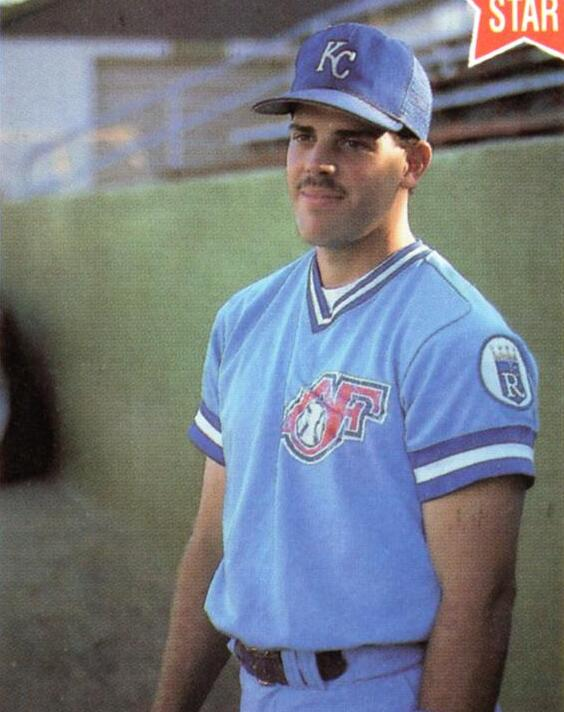
- Pedre with the Appleton Foxes c. 1988
- Catcher
- Born: October 12, 1966 (age 59); Culver City, California, U.S.
- Batted: Right Threw: Right

MLB debut
- September 7, 1991, for the Kansas City Royals

Last MLB appearance
- September 28, 1992, for the Chicago Cubs

MLB statistics
- Batting average: .217
- Hits: 5
- Games played: 14
- Stats at Baseball Reference

Teams
- Kansas City Royals (1991); Chicago Cubs (1992)

Jorge Enrique Pedre (born October 12, 1966) is an American former Major League Baseball catcher who played for two seasons. He played for the Kansas City Royals for ten games during the 1991 Kansas City Royals season and four games during the 1992 Chicago Cubs season. He now works at a refinery on the emergency response team.
