= Victor Cole =

Russian baseball player (born 1968)

- Pitcher
- Born: January 23, 1968 (age 57); Leningrad, Russian SFSR, Soviet Union
- Batted: Switch Threw: Right

Professional debut
- MLB: June 6, 1992, for the Pittsburgh Pirates
- KBO: May 9, 2000, for the SK Wyverns

Last appearance
- MLB: July 9, 1992, for the Pittsburgh Pirates
- KBO: September 25, 2002, for the Doosan Bears

MLB statistics
- Win–loss record: 0–2
- Earned run average: 5.48
- Strikeouts: 12

KBO statistics
- Win–loss record: 26–25
- Earned run average: 5.34
- Strikeouts: 280
- Stats at Baseball Reference

Teams
- Pittsburgh Pirates (1992); SK Wyverns (2000); Doosan Bears (2001–2002)

Victor Alexander Cole (born January 23, 1968) is a former professional baseball pitcher. Cole is the only Major League Baseball player to have been born in the Soviet Union, and the ninth to have been born in what is now Russia.

Cole pitched in eight games for the 1992 Pittsburgh Pirates, with an 0–2 record, 12 strikeouts and allowing 14 earned runs.

Cole attended Santa Clara University in California. Cole's father, from Sierra Leone, studied medicine in Russia and married a Russian woman. The family left Russia when Cole was four years old, lived in Sierra Leone for four years, then spent two years in Canada before moving to the United States when he was ten years old.

Cole was taken by the Kansas City Royals in the 14th round of the 1988 amateur draft. He was traded to the Pirates May 3, 1991 for Carmelo Martinez.

Cole played in the Milwaukee Brewers organization in 1994 and the San Diego Padres organization in 1995 and 1996. He announced his retirement during the 1995 season.

He then went to play in the Taiwan Major League for Kaoping Fala in 1997. Cole returned to the minors in 1998 and 1999 with the Chicago Cubs. He spent 2000 with the Memphis Redbirds, a AAA affiliate of the St. Louis Cardinals and SK Wyverns of the Korea Baseball Organization. Cole spent 2001 and 2002 with the KBO's Doosan Bears before retiring. In his ten seasons in the minor leagues, he had a record of 37 - 36 with an ERA of 3.70.

In 2003, Cole joined the Russia national baseball team. He also joined the team on its tour of the North American-based independent Northeast League. Cole later coached with the National Team in the 2020 European Championships, in Group B.
