= 1992 Pittsburgh Pirates season =

1992 Pittsburgh Pirates
- National League East champions
- League: National League
- Division: East
- Ballpark: Three Rivers Stadium
- City: Pittsburgh, Pennsylvania
- Record: 96–66 (.593)
- Divisional place: 1st
- Owners: Pittsburgh Associates
- General managers: Ted Simmons
- Managers: Jim Leyland
- Television: KDKA-TV; KBL
- Radio: KDKA-AM (Steve Blass, Kent Derdivanis, Lanny Frattare, Jim Rooker)

The 1992 Major League Baseball season was the 111th season in the history of the Pittsburgh Pirates and their 106th in the National League. This was their 23rd season at Three Rivers Stadium. For the third consecutive season, the Pirates won the National League East title with a record of 96–66.

In an NLCS rematch with the Atlanta Braves, the Pirates went down 3–1 before forcing a Game 7 back in Atlanta. They took a 2–0 lead into the bottom of the 9th inning, needing just one out to reach the World Series. But their season came to an abrupt end when they allowed 3 runs to the Braves, capped by Francisco Cabrera's two-run RBI single to score David Justice and an injured Sid Bream, a former Pirate. The loss was so agonizing for the Pirates that it contributed to a 20-year drought that saw them fail to clinch a winning season or postseason berth until 2013. This would be the final time that the Pirates would win the NL East as they would be reassigned to the National League Central during division realignment in 1994. Since the Pirates have never won the NL Central, this marks the most recent time that they have won a division title as of today. Moreover, this is the last time the Pirates have appeared in an NLCS.

== Offseason ==
- November 11, 1991: Al Martin was signed as a free agent by the Pirates.
- January 3, 1992: Mike LaValliere was signed as a free agent by the Pirates.
- March 10, 1992: Neal Heaton was traded by the Pirates to the Kansas City Royals for Kirk Gibson.
- March 11, 1992: Dennis Lamp was signed as a free agent by the Pirates.
- March 17, 1992: John Smiley was traded by the Pirates to the Minnesota Twins for Denny Neagle and Midre Cummings.

== Regular season ==
=== Season standings ===
NL East
Team	W	L	Pct.	GB	Home	Road
Pittsburgh Pirates	96	66	.593	—	53‍–‍28	43‍–‍38
Montreal Expos	87	75	.537	9	43‍–‍38	44‍–‍37
St. Louis Cardinals	83	79	.512	13	45‍–‍36	38‍–‍43
Chicago Cubs	78	84	.481	18	43‍–‍38	35‍–‍46
New York Mets	72	90	.444	24	41‍–‍40	31‍–‍50
Philadelphia Phillies	70	92	.432	26	41‍–‍40	29‍–‍52

=== Game log ===
1992 Game Log (96–66)
April (15–5)

#	Date	Opponent	Score	Win	Loss	Save	Attendance	Record
1	April 6	Expos	2–0	**Drabek**	Martinez	**Mason**	48,800	1–0
2	April 8	Expos	4–2	**Smith**	Gardner	**Belinda**	7,075	2–0
3	April 9	Expos	3–8	Nabholz	**Walk**	—	10,342	2–1
4	April 10	@ Phillies	3–2	**Tomlin**	Abbott	**Belinda**	21,019	3–1
5	April 11	@ Phillies	4–7	Ashby	**Drabek**	—	24,967	3–2
6	April 12	@ Phillies	6–1	**Smith**	Mulholland	—	32,624	4–2
7	April 14	Cubs	3–2	**Walk**	Jackson	**Mason**	14,963	5–2
8	April 15	Cubs	7–2	**Tomlin**	Morgan	—	9,022	6–2
9	April 17	Phillies	7–4	**Drabek**	Jones	**Belinda**	16,417	7–2
10	April 18	Phillies	9–2	**Smith**	Greene	—	23,411	8–2
11	April 19	Phillies	11–0	**Patterson**	Cox	—	11,812	9–2
12	April 20	@ Expos	11–1	**Tomlin**	Hill	—	12,351	10–2
13	April 21	@ Expos	8–7	**Palacios**	Haney	**Mason**	7,013	11–2
14	April 22	@ Expos	2–0	**Drabek**	Martinez	—	8,421	12–2
15	April 23	@ Expos	3–6	Gardner	**Smith**	Wetteland	5,806	12–3
16	April 24	@ Cubs	3–2	**Mason**	Scanlan	**Belinda**	11,331	13–3
17	April 25	@ Cubs	1–0	**Tomlin**	Maddux	**Belinda**	26,892	14–3
18	April 26	@ Cubs	4–5 (10)	McElroy	**Mason**	—	24,403	14–4
19	April 28	@ Reds	2–3	Browning	**Drabek**	Charlton	24,202	14–5
20	April 29	@ Reds	4–0	**Smith**	Belcher	—	20,307	15–5

May (11–17)

#	Date	Opponent	Score	Win	Loss	Save	Attendance	Record
21	May 1	@ Astros	4–10	Harnisch	**Tomlin**	—	16,355	15–6
22	May 2	@ Astros	6–0	**Neagle**	Bowen	—	23,812	16–6
23	May 3	@ Astros	0–1	Osuna	**Mason**	Jones	8,739	16–7
24	May 4	Reds	12–5	**Lamp**	Henry	—	16,343	17–7
25	May 5	Reds	5–2	**Miller**	Belcher	**Belinda**	9,103	18–7
26	May 6	Braves	4–3 (16)	**Patterson**	Rivera	—	18,686	19–7
27	May 7	Braves	2–4	Glavine	**Neagle**	Stanton	11,689	19–8
28	May 8	Astros	6–3	**Belinda**	Osuna	—	22,351	20–8
29	May 9	Astros	3–0	**Smith**	Kile	—	18,985	21–8
30	May 10	Astros	4–6 (10)	Jones	**Mason**	—	21,154	21–9
31	May 12	@ Braves	2–4	Glavine	**Tomlin**	Freeman	38,949	21–10
32	May 13	@ Braves	11–10	**Belinda**	Pena	—	24,872	22–10
33	May 14	@ Braves	4–3	**Palacios**	Smoltz	**Mason**	32,303	23–10
34	May 15	Padres	2–9	Lefferts	**Neagle**	—	20,232	23–11
35	May 16	Padres	9–10	Rodriguez	**Walk**	Myers	34,474	23–12
36	May 17	Padres	5–6	Benes	**Tomlin**	Myers	16,580	23–13
37	May 19	@ Giants	2–7	Wilson	**Drabek**	Righetti	12,995	23–14
38	May 20	@ Giants	1–3	Black	**Smith**	Brantley	15,554	23–15
39	May 21	@ Giants	0–1	Burkett	**Walk**	Jackson	14,708	23–16
40	May 22	@ Dodgers	6–4	**Tomlin**	Candiotti	—	33,888	24–16
41	May 23	@ Dodgers	4–5	Wilson	**Belinda**	—	39,910	24–17
42	May 24	@ Dodgers	2–4	Gross	**Drabek**	McDowell	36,407	24–18
43	May 25	@ Padres	6–7	Lefferts	**Smith**	Myers	18,546	24–19
44	May 26	@ Padres	3–6 (10)	Scott	**Lamp**	—	11,709	24–20
45	May 27	@ Padres	7–8	Myers	**Belinda**	—	16,338	24–21
46	May 29	Giants	13–3	**Palacios**	Wilson	**Patterson**	23,421	25–21
47	May 30	Giants	3–2 (10)	**Neagle**	Brantley	—	10,266	26–21
48	May 31	Giants	3–5	Black	**Smith**	Brantley	29,451	26–22

June (17–11)

#	Date	Opponent	Score	Win	Loss	Save	Attendance	Record
49	June 1	Dodgers	6–8	Gott	**Neagle**	Candelaria	12,346	26–23
50	June 2	Dodgers	1–0	**Tomlin**	Candiotti	**Mason**	18,644	27–23
51	June 3	Dodgers	6–5	**Gleaton**	Martinez	**Belinda**	11,736	28–23
52	June 4	Mets	7–2	**Drabek**	Gooden	**Patterson**	24,907	29–23
53	June 5	Mets	5–4 (10)	**Belinda**	Innis	—	23,957	30–23
54	June 6	Mets	1–15	Fernandez	**Neagle**	—	32,138	30–24
55	June 7	Mets	3–0	**Tomlin**	Schourek	—	33,451	31–24
56	June 8	@ Phillies	0–7	Schilling	**Palacios**	—	21,040	31–25
57	June 9	@ Phillies	5–3	**Drabek**	Hartley	**Neagle**	29,138	32–25
58	June 10	@ Phillies	2–1 (12)	**Patterson**	Jones	**Mason**	25,112	33–25
59	June 12	@ Mets	3–2	**Tomlin**	Fernandez	**Patterson**	38,976	34–25
60	June 13	@ Mets	3–2	**Robinson**	Whitehurst	**Belinda**	39,009	35–25
61	June 14	@ Mets	5–4	**Neagle**	Innis	**Belinda**	43,527	36–25
62	June 15	Phillies	1–4	Mulholland	**Smith**	—	23,581	36–26
63	June 16	Phillies	6–5 (12)	**Patterson**	Brantley	—	18,548	37–26
64	June 17	Phillies	8–2	**Tomlin**	Robinson	—	24,854	38–26
65	June 18	Expos	0–4	Nabholz	**Palacios**	Fassero	20,512	38–27
66	June 19	Expos	1–2	Hill	**Drabek**	Wetteland	22,091	38–28
67	June 20	Expos	3–4	Gardner	**Smith**	Wetteland	31,614	38–29
68	June 21	Expos	5–4	**Robinson**	Martinez	**Belinda**	20,138	39–29
69	June 22	Cardinals	5–2	**Tomlin**	Osborne	**Walk**	20,831	40–29
70	June 23	Cardinals	6–4	**Mason**	Worrell	**Patterson**	11,408	41–29
71	June 24	Cardinals	1–4	Tewksbury	**Drabek**	—	22,096	41–30
72	June 26	@ Expos	2–6	Martinez	**Smith**	Rojas	23,014	41–31
73	June 27	@ Expos	12–4	**Robinson**	Gardner	**Belinda**	20,146	42–31
74	June 28	@ Expos	0–9	Barnes	**Tomlin**	—	24,793	42–32
75	June 29	@ Cardinals	1–3	Tewksbury	**Cole**	—	38,381	42–33
76	June 30	@ Cardinals	2–0	**Drabek**	Cormier	—	32,252	43–33

July (12–15)

#	Date	Opponent	Score	Win	Loss	Save	Attendance	Record
77	July 1	@ Cardinals	1–0	**Smith**	Clark	—	40,042	44–33
78	July 2	Reds	1–2	Rijo	**Robinson**	Charlton	19,445	44–34
79	July 3	Reds	3–7	Belcher	**Tomlin**	—	29,870	44–35
80	July 4	Reds	2–5	Swindell	**Cole**	—	21,507	44–36
81	July 5	Reds	1–2	Menendez	**Drabek**	Charlton	24,369	44–37
82	July 6	Astros	1–0	**Smith**	Jones	**Belinda**	15,358	45–37
83	July 7	Astros	5–3	**Walk**	Boever	—	19,164	46–37
84	July 8	Astros	2–3	Jones	**Patterson**	—	22,551	46–38
85	July 9	@ Reds	2–5	Bankhead	**Mason**	Charlton	32,681	46–39
86	July 10	@ Reds	4–0	**Drabek**	Hammond	—	42,438	47–39
87	July 11	@ Reds	9–3	**Smith**	Brown	—	44,367	48–39
88	July 12	@ Reds	7–6 (10)	**Patterson**	Belcher	**Belinda**	35,120	49–39
89	July 16	Cubs	2–1	**Drabek**	Boskie	**Belinda**	30,504	50–39
90	July 17	Cubs	1–2	Maddux	**Tomlin**	Scanlan	24,037	50–40
91	July 18	Cubs	4–0	**Walk**	Morgan	**Patterson**	32,908	51–40
92	July 19	Cubs	2–4	Scanlan	**Neagle**	—	32,304	51–41
93	July 20	@ Astros	8–11	Blair	**Mason**	Jones	12,112	51–42
94	July 21	@ Astros	3–4 (12)	Jones	**Mason**	—	13,836	51–43
95	July 22	@ Astros	10–7 (13)	**Belinda**	Blair	**Patterson**	13,194	52–43
96	July 24	@ Braves	3–4	Glavine	**Walk**	Pena	44,965	52–44
97	July 25	@ Braves	0–1	Leibrandt	**Jackson**	Mercker	44,567	52–45
98	July 26	@ Braves	5–4	**Belinda**	Wohlers	—	43,714	53–45
99	July 27	@ Cubs	2–3	Maddux	**Drabek**	Robinson	34,990	53–46
100	July 28	@ Cubs	1–11	Morgan	**Tomlin**	—	35,187	53–47
101	July 29	@ Cubs	4–6 (11)	Assenmacher	**Belinda**	—	36,554	53–48
102	July 30	Cardinals	4–0	**Jackson**	Clark	**Patterson**	18,295	54–48
103	July 31	Cardinals	3–2	**Wakefield**	DeLeon	—	20,299	55–48

August (19–8)

#	Date	Opponent	Score	Win	Loss	Save	Attendance	Record
104	August 1	Cardinals	4–1	**Drabek**	Olivares	—	30,577	56–48
105	August 2	Cardinals	2–1	**Walk**	Smith	—	28,309	57–48
106	August 4	Mets	3–2 (12)	**Walk**	Filer	—	28,211	58–48
107	August 5	Mets	6–2	**Wakefield**	Schourek	—	30,009	59–48
108	August 6	@ Cardinals	3–2 (13)	**Mason**	Smith	**Neagle**	32,001	60–48
109	August 7	@ Cardinals	5–1	**Tomlin**	Cormier	—	37,518	61–48
110	August 8	@ Cardinals	2–1	**Walk**	Tewksbury	**Belinda**	44,094	62–48
111	August 9	@ Cardinals	7–5	**Mason**	Clark	**Walk**	40,444	63–48
112	August 10	@ Mets	4–2 (16)	**Cooke**	Guetterman	—	25,387	64–48
113	August 11	@ Mets	0–2	Hillman	**Drabek**	Franco	20,488	64–49
114	August 12	@ Mets	7–6 (10)	**Neagle**	Franco	**Patterson**	29,559	65–49
115	August 14	Braves	0–15	Glavine	**Smith**	—	38,595	65–50
116	August 15	Braves	5–7	Avery	**Jackson**	Pena	38,808	65–51
117	August 16	Braves	4–2	**Wakefield**	Smoltz	—	35,199	66–51
118	August 17	Braves	4–5 (10)	Freeman	**Patterson**	Pena	38,062	66–52
119	August 18	Padres	5–1	**Tomlin**	Benes	—	21,453	67–52
120	August 19	Padres	3–2	**Walk**	Deshaies	**Cox**	34,696	68–52
121	August 20	Padres	7–1	**Jackson**	Lefferts	—	30,384	69–52
122	August 21	@ Giants	5–6	Burkett	**Wakefield**	Beck	16,767	69–53
123	August 22	@ Giants	9–2	**Drabek**	Oliveras	—	30,568	70–53
124	August 23	@ Giants	2–5	Black	**Tomlin**	—	32,129	70–54
125	August 24	@ Dodgers	4–5	Gott	Neagle	Candelaria	21,991	70–55
126	August 25	@ Dodgers	10–3	**Cox**	Martinez	—	24,170	71–55
127	August 26	@ Dodgers	2–0	**Wakefield**	Candiotti	—	25,006	72–55
128	August 28	@ Padres	6–11	Maddux	**Drabek**	—	15,916	72–56
129	August 29	@ Padres	3–2	**Tomlin**	Harris	**Mason**	24,965	73–56
130	August 30	@ Padres	6–3	**Walk**	Deshaies	—	18,617	74–56

September (21–8)

#	Date	Opponent	Score	Win	Loss	Save	Attendance	Record
131	September 1	Giants	5–3	**Jackson**	Burkett	**Mason**	20,930	75–56
132	September 2	Giants	3–2	**Wakefield**	Black	**Patterson**	13,099	76–56
133	September 3	Giants	9–3	**Drabek**	Brantley	—	9,057	77–56
134	September 4	Dodgers	6–5	**Patterson**	Gott	—	30,341	78–56
135	September 5	Dodgers	6–1	**Walk**	Hershiser	—	41,420	79–56
136	September 6	Dodgers	5–7	Candiotti	**Cox**	Howell	20,362	79–57
137	September 7	Cubs	5–6 (11)	Assenmacher	**Belinda**	Scanlan	21,663	79–58
138	September 8	Cubs	5–2	**Drabek**	Boskie	—	7,720	80–58
139	September 9	Cubs	13–8	**Cox**	Robinson	—	10,853	81–58
140	September 11	@ Phillies	2–5	Rivera	**Walk**	Williams	20,168	81–59
141	September 12	@ Phillies	9–7	**Belinda**	Williams	—	22,857	82–59
142	September 13	@ Phillies	3–6	Mulholland	**Patterson**	—	35,842	82–60
143	September 14	@ Cardinals	5–4 (10)	**Drabek**	Smith	**Belinda**	19,470	83–60
144	September 15	@ Cardinals	4–2	**Wagner**	Clark	**Cox**	20,992	84–60
145	September 16	Expos	3–6	Nabholz	**Walk**	Wetteland	37,436	84–61
146	September 17	Expos	3–2 (13)	**Cox**	Bottenfield	—	20,802	85–61
147	September 18	Phillies	5–2 (6)	**Wakefield**	Mulholland	—	20,387	86–61
148	September 19	Phillies	3–0	**Drabek**	Greene	—	25,497	87–61
149	September 20	Phillies	3–2 (13)	**Mason**	Shepherd	—	21,652	88–61
150	September 21	Cardinals	3–0	**Cooke**	Magrane	—	13,345	89–61
151	September 22	Cardinals	4–5	Cormier	**Jackson**	Smith	8,222	89–62
152	September 23	@ Expos	1–5 (14)	Fassero	**Mason**	—	30,552	89–63
153	September 24	@ Expos	9–3	**Drabek**	Krueger	—	33,493	90–63
154	September 25	Mets	3–2	**Tomlin**	Fernandez	**Cox**	22,291	91–63
155	September 26	Mets	19–2	**Walk**	Hillman	—	25,886	92–63
156	September 27	Mets	4–2	**Jackson**	Schourek	**Belinda**	31,217	93–63
157	September 28	@ Cubs	10–3	**Wakefield**	Bullinger	—	9,603	94–63
158	September 29	@ Cubs	3–0	**Wagner**	Castillo	**Belinda**	18,759	95–63
159	September 30	@ Cubs	0–6	Maddux	**Tomlin**	—	11,547	95–64

October (1–2)

#	Date	Opponent	Score	Win	Loss	Save	Attendance	Record
160	October 2	@ Mets	3–6	Schourek	**Drabek**	Jones	10,183	95–65
161	October 3	@ Mets	1–2	Gooden	**Jackson**	—	13,549	95–66
162	October 4	@ Mets	2–0	**Wakefield**	Saberhagen	**Cooke**	14,274	96–66

Legend: = Win = Loss
Bold = Pirates team member

=== Record vs. opponents ===
1992 National League record Sources:
Team	ATL	CHC	CIN	HOU	LAD	MON	NYM	PHI	PIT	SD	SF	STL
Atlanta	—	10–2	9–9	13–5	12–6	4–8	7–5	6–6	7–5	13–5	11–7	6–6
Chicago	2–10	—	5–7	8–4	6–6	7–11	9–9	9–9	8–10	5–7	8–4	11–7
Cincinnati	9–9	7–5	—	10–8	11–7	5–7	7–5	7–5	6–6	11–7	10–8	7–5
Houston	5–13	4–8	8–10	—	13–5	8–4	5–7	8–4	6–6	7–11	12–6	5–7
Los Angeles	6–12	6–6	7–11	5–13	—	4–8	5–7	5–7	5–7	9–9	7–11	4–8
Montreal	8–4	11–7	7–5	4–8	8–4	—	12–6	9–9	9–9	8–4	5–7	6–12
New York	5–7	9–9	5–7	7–5	7–5	6–12	—	6–12	4–14	4–8	10–2	9–9
Philadelphia	6-6	9–9	5–7	4–8	7–5	9–9	12–6	—	5–13	3–9	3–9	7–11
Pittsburgh	5–7	10–8	6–6	6–6	7–5	9–9	14–4	13–5	—	5–7	6–6	15–3
San Diego	5–13	7–5	7–11	11–7	9–9	4–8	8–4	9–3	7–5	—	11–7	4–8
San Francisco	7–11	4–8	8–10	6–12	11–7	7–5	2–10	9–3	6–6	7–11	—	5–7
St. Louis	6–6	7–11	5–7	7–5	8–4	12–6	9–9	11–7	3–15	8–4	7–5	—

=== Detailed records ===
**National League**
Opponent	W	L	WP	RS	RA
**NL East**
Chicago Cubs	10	8	0.556	70	63
Montreal Expos	9	9	0.500	72	73
New York Mets	14	4	0.778	79	57
Philadelphia Phillies	13	5	0.722	87	60
St. Louis Cardinals	15	3	0.833	62	37
Total	61	29	0.678	370	290
**NL West**
Atlanta Braves	5	7	0.417	44	62
Cincinnati Reds	6	6	0.500	52	40
Houston Astros	6	6	0.500	52	48
Los Angeles Dodgers	7	5	0.583	58	47
San Diego Padres	5	7	0.417	62	66
San Francisco Giants	6	6	0.500	55	42
Total	35	37	0.486	323	305
Season Total	96	66	0.593	693	595

Month	Games	Won	Lost	Win %	RS	RA
April	20	15	5	0.750	97	54
May	28	11	17	0.393	129	131
June	28	17	11	0.607	100	110
July	27	12	15	0.444	90	96
August	27	19	8	0.704	118	95
September	29	21	8	0.724	153	101
October	3	1	2	0.333	6	8
Total	162	96	66	0.593	693	595

	Games	Won	Lost	Win %	RS	RA
Home	81	53	28	0.654	363	277
Away	81	43	38	0.531	330	318
Total	162	96	66	0.593	693	595

== Roster ==
1992 Pittsburgh Pirates
Roster
Pitchers: 53 Miguel Batista; 50 Stan Belinda; 61 Victor Cole; 26 Steve Cooke; 57 Danny Cox; 15 Doug Drabek; 49 Jerry Don Gleaton; 34 Danny Jackson; 26 Dennis Lamp; 48 Roger Mason; 64 Paul Miller; 66 Blas Minor; 32 Denny Neagle; 58 Vicente Palacios; 38 Bob Patterson; 26 Jeff Robinson; 41 Zane Smith; 29 Randy Tomlin; 43 Paul Wagner; 49 Tim Wakefield; 17 Bob Walk	Catchers: 12 Mike LaValliere; 14 Tom Prince; 11 Don Slaught; Infielders: 3 Jay Bell; 22 Steve Buechele; 51 Carlos García; 7 Jeff King; 13 José Lind; 6 Orlando Merced; 2 Gary Redus; 22 John Wehner; 36 Kevin Young	Outfielders: 24 Barry Bonds; 35 Dave Clark; 5 Alex Cole; 56 Cecil Espy; 25 Kirk Gibson; 28 Al Martin; 23 Lloyd McClendon; 25 Will Pennyfeather; 18 Andy Van Slyke; 42 Gary Varsho	Manager: 10 Jim Leyland; Coaches: 44 Terry Collins (bullpen); 45 Rich Donnelly (third base); 39 Milt May (hitting); 31 Ray Miller (pitching); 37 Tommy Sandt (first base); 19 Bill Virdon (bench)

=== Opening Day lineup ===
Opening Day Starters
#	Name	Position
25	Kirk Gibson	RF
3	Jay Bell	SS
18	Andy Van Slyke	CF
24	Barry Bonds	LF
6	Orlando Merced	1B
22	Steve Buechele	3B
12	Mike LaValliere	C
13	José Lind	2B
15	Doug Drabek	SP

== Player stats ==
Batting

Note: G = Games played; AB = At bats; H = Hits; Avg. = Batting average; HR = Home runs; RBI = Runs batted in

Regular season
Player	G	AB	H	Avg.	HR	RBI
S. Belinda	59	3	2	0.667	0	2
K. Young	10	7	4	0.571	0	4
D. Slaught	87	255	88	0.345	4	37
S. Cooke	11	3	1	0.333	0	1
B. Patterson	60	6	2	0.333	0	4
P. Wagner	6	3	1	0.333	0	0
A. Van Slyke	154	614	199	0.324	14	89
B. Bonds	140	473	147	0.311	34	103
V. Cole	64	205	57	0.278	0	10
J. Bell	159	632	167	0.264	9	55
C. Espy	112	194	50	0.258	1	20
M. LaValliere	95	293	75	0.256	2	29
G. Redus	76	176	45	0.256	3	12
L. McClendon	84	190	48	0.253	3	20
S. Buechele	80	285	71	0.249	8	43
O. Merced	134	405	100	0.247	6	60
J. Lind	135	468	110	0.235	0	39
J. King	130	480	111	0.231	14	65
W. Pennyfeather	15	9	2	0.222	0	0
G. Varsho	103	162	36	0.222	4	22
D. Clark	23	33	7	0.212	2	7
C. García	22	39	8	0.205	0	4
K. Gibson	16	56	11	0.196	2	5
J. Wehner	55	123	22	0.179	0	4
A. Martin	12	12	2	0.167	0	2
D. Drabek	35	89	14	0.157	0	6
R. Tomlin	35	65	9	0.138	0	1
Z. Smith	26	49	6	0.122	0	3
B. Walk	36	43	4	0.093	0	2
T. Prince	27	44	4	0.091	0	5
J. Robinson	8	11	1	0.091	0	1
D. Jackson	15	24	2	0.083	0	1
V. Palacios	20	14	1	0.071	0	0
T. Wakefield	14	28	2	0.071	0	0
A. Cole	8	4	0	0.000	0	0
D. Cox	16	3	0	0.000	0	0
J. Gleaton	23	2	0	0.000	0	0
D. Lamp	21	1	0	0.000	0	0
R. Mason	65	10	0	0.000	0	0
P. Miller	6	3	0	0.000	0	0
D. Neagle	56	11	0	0.000	0	0
M. Batista	1	0	0	—	0	0
B. Minor	1	0	0	—	0	0
Team totals	162	5,527	1,409	0.255	106	656

Postseason
Player	G	AB	H	Avg.	HR	RBI
L. McClendon	5	11	8	0.727	1	4
C. Espy	4	3	2	0.667	0	0
G. Varsho	2	2	1	0.500	0	0
G. Redus	5	16	7	0.438	0	3
D. Slaught	5	12	4	0.333	1	5
A. Van Slyke	7	29	8	0.276	0	4
B. Bonds	7	23	6	0.261	1	2
J. King	7	29	7	0.241	0	2
J. Lind	7	27	6	0.222	1	5
V. Cole	4	10	2	0.200	0	1
M. LaValliere	3	10	2	0.200	0	0
J. Bell	7	29	5	0.172	1	4
O. Merced	4	10	1	0.100	0	2
D. Drabek	3	6	0	0.000	0	0
C. García	1	1	0	0.000	0	0
T. Wakefield	2	6	0	0.000	0	0
B. Walk	2	5	0	0.000	0	0
J. Wehner	2	2	0	0.000	0	0
S. Belinda	2	0	0	—	0	0
D. Cox	2	0	0	—	0	0
D. Jackson	1	0	0	—	0	0
R. Mason	2	0	0	—	0	0
D. Neagle	2	0	0	—	0	0
B. Patterson	2	0	0	—	0	0
R. Tomlin	2	0	0	—	0	0
Team totals	7	231	59	0.255	5	32

Pitching

Note: G = Games pitched; IP = Innings pitched; W = Wins; L = Losses; ERA = Earned run average; SO = Strikeouts

Regular season
Player	G	IP	W	L	ERA	SO
P. Wagner	6	13	2	0	0.69	5
T. Wakefield	13	92	8	1	2.15	51
P. Miller	6	11 1/3	1	0	2.38	5
D. Drabek	34	256 2/3	15	11	2.77	177
B. Patterson	60	64 2/3	6	3	2.92	43
Z. Smith	23	141	8	8	3.06	56
S. Belinda	59	71 1/3	6	4	3.15	57
B. Walk	36	135	10	6	3.20	60
D. Cox	16	24 1/3	3	1	3.33	18
D. Jackson	15	88 1/3	4	4	3.36	46
R. Tomlin	35	208 2/3	14	9	3.41	90
S. Cooke	11	23	2	0	3.52	10
R. Mason	65	88	5	7	4.09	56
V. Palacios	20	53	3	2	4.25	33
J. Gleaton	23	31 2/3	1	0	4.26	18
J. Robinson	8	36 1/3	3	1	4.46	14
D. Neagle	55	86 1/3	4	6	4.48	77
B. Minor	1	2	0	0	4.50	0
D. Lamp	21	28	1	1	5.14	15
A. Cole	8	23	0	2	5.48	12
M. Batista	1	2	0	0	9.00	1
Team totals	162	1,479 2/3	96	66	3.35	844

Postseason
Player	G	IP	W	L	ERA	SO
S. Belinda	2	1 2/3	0	0	0.00	2
D. Cox	2	1 1/3	0	0	0.00	1
R. Mason	2	3 1/3	0	0	0.00	1
T. Wakefield	2	18	2	0	3.00	7
D. Drabek	3	17	0	3	3.71	10
B. Walk	2	11 2/3	1	0	3.86	6
B. Patterson	2	1 2/3	0	0	5.40	1
R. Tomlin	2	2 2/3	0	0	6.75	0
D. Jackson	1	1 2/3	0	1	21.60	0
D. Neagle	2	1 2/3	0	0	27.00	0
Team totals	7	60 2/3	3	4	4.45	28

== National League Championship Series ==
=== Game 1 ===
October 6: Atlanta–Fulton County Stadium, Atlanta

Team	1	2	3	4	5	6	7	8	9	R	H	E
Pittsburgh	0	0	0	0	0	0	0	1	0	1	5	1
Atlanta	0	1	0	2	1	0	1	0	X	5	8	0
W: John Smoltz (1-0) L: Doug Drabek (0-1) S: None
HR: PIT – José Lind (1) ATL – Jeff Blauser (1)
Pitchers: PIT – Drabek (4 2/3), Patterson (1 1/3), Neagle (1), Cox (1) ATL – Smoltz (8), Stanton (1)
Attendance: 51,971 Time: 3:20

=== Game 2 ===
October 7: Atlanta–Fulton County Stadium, Atlanta

Team	1	2	3	4	5	6	7	8	9	R	H	E
Pittsburgh	0	0	0	0	0	0	4	1	0	5	7	0
Atlanta	0	4	0	0	4	0	5	0	X	13	14	0
W: Steve Avery (1-0) L: Danny Jackson (0-1) S: None
HR: PIT – none ATL – Ron Gant (1)
Pitchers: PIT – Jackson (1 2/3), Mason (1/3), Walk (2 2/3), Tomlin (1 1/3), Neagle (2/3), Patterson (1/3), Belinda (1) ATL – Avery (6 1/3), Freeman (1/3), Stanton (1/3), Wohlers (1), Reardon (1)
Attendance: 51,975 Time: 3:20

=== Game 3 ===
October 9: Three Rivers Stadium, Pittsburgh, Pennsylvania

Team	1	2	3	4	5	6	7	8	9	R	H	E
Atlanta	0	0	0	1	0	0	1	0	0	2	5	0
Pittsburgh	0	0	0	0	1	1	1	0	X	3	8	1
W: Tim Wakefield (1-0) L: Tom Glavine (0-1) S: None
HR: ATL – Sid Bream (1), Ron Gant (2) PIT – Don Slaught (1)
Pitchers: ATL – Glavine (6 1/3), Stanton (2/3), Wohlers (1) PIT – Wakefield (9)
Attendance: 56,610 Time: 2:37

=== Game 4 ===
October 10: Three Rivers Stadium, Pittsburgh, Pennsylvania

Team	1	2	3	4	5	6	7	8	9	R	H	E
Atlanta	0	2	0	0	2	2	0	0	0	6	11	1
Pittsburgh	0	2	1	0	0	0	1	0	0	4	6	1
W: John Smoltz (2-0) L: Doug Drabek (0-2) S: Jeff Reardon (1)
HR: ATL – none PIT – none
Pitchers: ATL – Smoltz (6 1/3), Stanton (1 2/3), Reardon (1) PIT – Drabek (4 1/3), Tomlin (1 1/3), Cox (1/3), Mason (3)
Attendance: 57,164 Time: 3:10

=== Game 5 ===
October 11: Three Rivers Stadium, Pittsburgh, Pennsylvania

Team	1	2	3	4	5	6	7	8	9	R	H	E
Atlanta	0	0	0	0	0	0	0	1	0	1	3	0
Pittsburgh	4	0	1	0	0	1	1	0	X	7	13	0
W: Bob Walk (1-0) L: Steve Avery (1-1) S: none
HR: ATL – none PIT – none
Pitchers: ATL – Avery (1/3), P. Smith (3 2/3), Leibrandt (1 2/3), Freeman (1 1/3), Mercker (1) PIT – Walk (9)
Attendance: 52,929 Time: 2:52

=== Game 6 ===
October 13: Atlanta–Fulton County Stadium, Atlanta

Team	1	2	3	4	5	6	7	8	9	R	H	E
Pittsburgh	0	8	0	0	4	1	0	0	0	13	13	1
Atlanta	0	0	0	1	0	0	1	0	2	4	9	1
W: Tim Wakefield (2-0) L: Tom Glavine (0-2) S: none
HR: PIT – Barry Bonds (1), Jay Bell (1), Lloyd McClendon (1) ATL – David Justice (1,2)
Pitchers: PIT – Wakefield (9) ATL – Glavine (1+), Leibrandt (3), Freeman (2), Mercker (2) Wohlers (1)
Attendance: 51,975 Time: 2:50

=== Game 7 ===
October 14: Atlanta–Fulton County Stadium, Atlanta

Team	1	2	3	4	5	6	7	8	9	R	H	E
Pittsburgh	1	0	0	0	0	1	0	0	0	2	7	1
Atlanta	0	0	0	0	0	0	0	0	3	3	7	0
W: Jeff Reardon (1-0) L: Doug Drabek (0-3) S: none
HR: PIT – none ATL – none
Pitchers: PIT – Drabek (8), Belinda (2/3) ATL – Smoltz (6), Stanton (2/3), P. Smith (0), Avery (1 1/3), Reardon (1)
Attendance: 51,975 Time: 3:22

== Awards and honors ==
- Barry Bonds, OF, National League Most Valuable Player Award
- Jim Leyland, National League Manager of the Year Award
- Randy Tomlin, National League Pitcher of the Month, June
- Tim Wakefield, National League Rookie Pitcher of the Year

1992 Major League Baseball All-Star Game

- Andy Van Slyke, CF, starter
- Barry Bonds, LF, starter

== Notable transactions ==
- May 5, 1992: Kirk Gibson was released by the Pirates.
- June 10, 1992: Jeff Robinson was selected off waivers by the Pirates from the Texas Rangers.
- June 11, 1992: Dennis Lamp was released by the Pirates.
- June 19, 1992: Danny Cox was signed as a free agent by the Pirates.
- July 4, 1992: Tony Mitchell (minors) was traded by the Pirates to the Cleveland Indians for Alex Cole.
- July 25, 1992: Jeff Robinson was released by the Pirates.
- July 31, 1992: Pitcher Tim Wakefield called up from AAA Buffalo.

=== Draft picks ===
- June 1, 1992: Jason Kendall was drafted by the Pirates in the 1st round (23rd pick) of the 1992 Major League Baseball draft. Player signed June 16, 1992.
- June 1, 1992: Chance Sanford was drafted by the Pittsburgh Pirates in the 27th round of the 1992 amateur draft. Player signed June 4, 1992.

== Farm system ==
Level	Team	League	Manager
AAA	Buffalo Bisons	American Association	Marc Bombard
AA	Carolina Mudcats	Southern League	Don Werner
A	Salem Buccaneers	Carolina League	John Wockenfuss
A	Augusta Pirates	South Atlantic League	Scott Little
A-Short Season	Welland Pirates	New York–Penn League	Trent Jewett
Rookie	GCL Pirates	Gulf Coast League	Woody Huyke
