= Matt Maysey =

Canadian baseball player (born 1967)

- Pitcher
- Born: January 8, 1967 (age 59); Hamilton, Ontario, Canada
- Batted: Right Threw: Right

MLB debut
- July 8, 1992, for the Montreal Expos

Last MLB appearance
- September 28, 1993, for the Milwaukee Brewers

MLB statistics
- Win–loss record: 1–2
- Earned run average: 5.55
- Strikeouts: 11

CPBL statistics
- Win–loss record: 0–1
- Earned run average: 5.79
- Strikeouts: 5
- Stats at Baseball Reference

Teams
- Montreal Expos (1992); Milwaukee Brewers (1993); Wei Chuan Dragons (1996)

Matthew Samuel Maysey (born January 8, 1967) is a Canadian former Major League Baseball (MLB) pitcher who played for two seasons. He pitched two games for the Montreal Expos in 1992 and 23 games for the Milwaukee Brewers in 1993.

Maysey was selected by the San Diego Padres in the 7th round of the 1985 MLB draft from Alief Hastings High School in Houston, Texas. After toiling in San Diego's farm system for several years, ( 1985-1990), he was released on Valentine's Day 1991. He was signed by the Montreal Expos less than a month later. In 1992, he was called up to the Major Leagues for the first time when Moisés Alou suffered a hamstring injury. He made his MLB debut at Dodger Stadium on July 8, 1992 in a rescheduled game due to the 1992 Los Angeles riots. He surrendered a walk-off single to Dave Hansen in extra innings. Maysey would appear in only one more game for the Expos that season on the following day, pitching two innings in a winning effort against the San Francisco Giants.

Maysey was granted free agency by the Expos following the season and signed with the Milwaukee Brewers on November 24, 1992. He was promoted from the New Orleans Zephyrs in July 1993 following an injury to Milwaukee pitcher Bill Wegman.

On August 24, 1993, Maysey recorded his first hit and his first pitching win in the same game. After ten players and coaches were ejected in a bench-clearing brawl, Maysey pitched a scoreless 13th inning and then recorded a clutch two-out single in the bottom half of the inning before Dave Nilsson won the game with a line drive single. He recorded his first and final MLB save on September 3 at the Kingdome.

After 1993, Maysey spent two seasons in Triple-A with the Pittsburgh Pirates. His 1996 season, spent with the Wei Chuan Dragons of the Chinese Professional Baseball League and two different Prairie League teams, would be his final in professional baseball.

His stepson, Connor Wong, was selected in the third round of the 2017 MLB draft by the Los Angeles Dodgers. As of 2019, Maysey is one of only 90 players with a career MLB batting average of 1.000.
