= Stu Cole =

American baseball player and coach (born 1966)

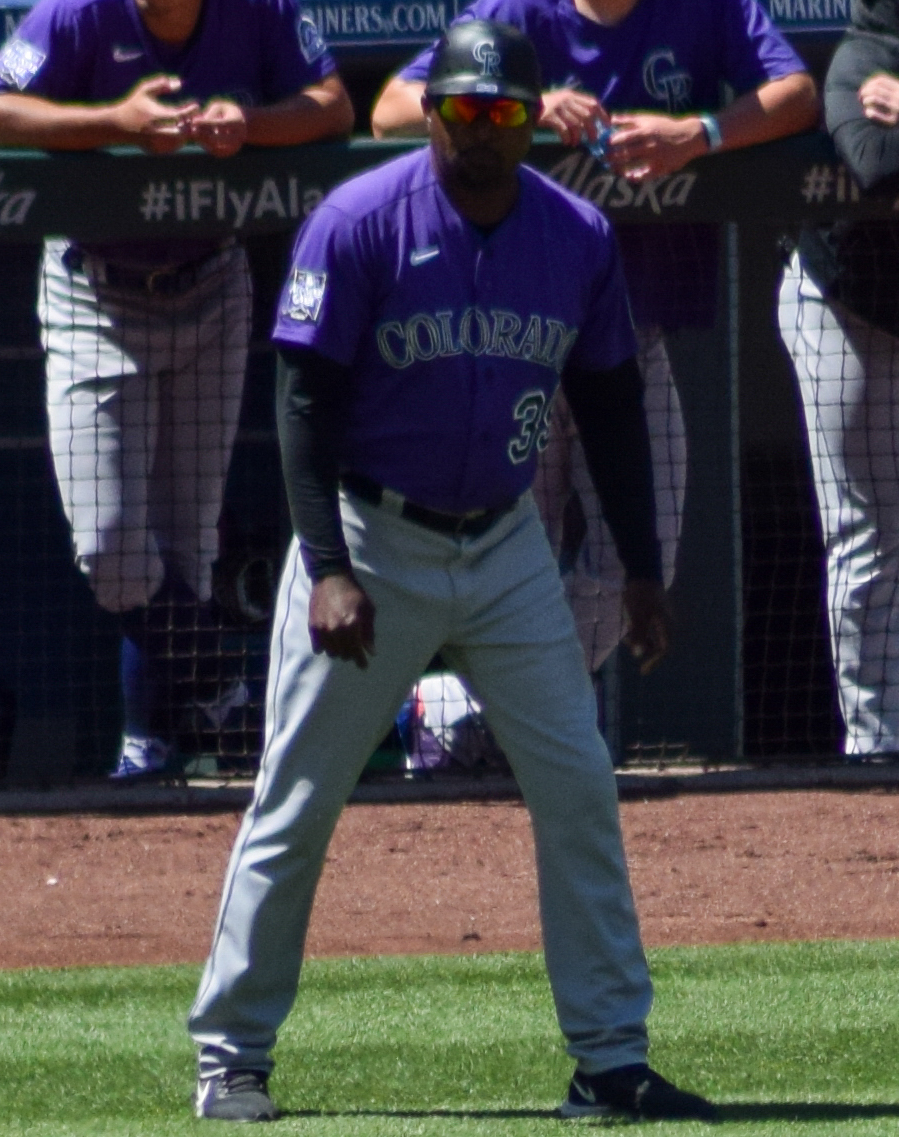
- Cole with the Colorado Rockies in 2021
- Infielder / Coach
- Born: February 7, 1966 (age 60); Charlotte, North Carolina, U.S.
- Batted: Right Threw: Right

MLB debut
- September 5, 1991, for the Kansas City Royals

Last MLB appearance
- October 6, 1991, for the Kansas City Royals

MLB statistics
- Batting average: .143
- Home runs: 0
- Runs batted in: 0
- Stats at Baseball Reference

Teams
- Kansas City Royals (1991); As coach: Colorado Rockies (2013–2022)

Stewart Bryan Cole (born February 7, 1966) is an American former professional baseball infielder and coach. He was the third base coach for the Colorado Rockies of Major League Baseball (MLB) from 2013 to 2022. He played in 9 MLB games for the Kansas City Royals in 1991, playing in the minor leagues from 1987 to 1995.

== Playing career ==
Cole attended South Mecklenburg High School in Charlotte, North Carolina. He was drafted by the Pittsburgh Pirates in the 19th round of the 1984 MLB draft but did not sign with the Pirates. He then attended the University of North Carolina at Charlotte. He was named to the All-Sun Belt Conference second team in 1987, leading the 49ers in batting average, hits, and home runs. He was drafted by the Kansas City Royals with the 67th pick in the third round of the 1987 MLB draft, three spots ahead of John Vander Wal.

Cole played in professional baseball from 1987 through 1995 in the Kansas City Royals and Colorado Rockies organizations. He played nine game in MLB for the Royals in 1991. His only hit came on September 13, a 12th inning single off of Michael Jackson of the Seattle Mariners. He failed to lay down a bunt before getting his only MLB hit.

Cole joined the Rockies organization in 1993. He was a replacement player in spring training in 1995 during the ongoing strike. That year, he played his final minor league games and also began coaching.

== Coaching career ==
Cole coached in the Rockies organization beginning in 1995. In 2001, he became the first manager of the Tri-City Dust Devils in franchise history. He managed the Double-A Tulsa Drillers from 2006 to 2009 and was named manager of the Triple-A Colorado Springs Sky Sox in May 2009. He was named third base coach for the Rockies on November 15, 2012. Cole was nicknamed "The Doctor" because his batting practice pitching could make Rockies batters feel good. He also coached infield defense with the Rockies. The Rockies reassigned Cole to a minor league staff position following the 2022 season. Future Rockies manager Warren Schaeffer replaced Cole as third base coach.

== Personal life ==
Cole is married and has two children.

Preceded by Tom Runnells	Tulsa Drillers Manager; 2006–2009	Succeeded by Ron Gideon
Preceded by Tom Runnells	Colorado Springs Sky Sox Manager; 2009–2012	Succeeded by Glenallen Hill
Preceded by Rich Dauer	Colorado Rockies third base coach 2013–2022	Succeeded by Warren Schaeffer
