= Chris Haney =

American baseball player (born 1968)

- Pitcher
- Born: November 16, 1968 (age 57); Baltimore, Maryland, U.S.
- Batted: Left Threw: Left

Professional debut
- MLB: June 21, 1990, for the Montreal Expos
- NPB: April 20, 2001, for the Fukuoka Daiei Hawks

Last appearance
- NPB: August 14, 2001, for the Fukuoka Daiei Hawks
- MLB: August 18, 2002, for the Boston Red Sox

MLB statistics
- Win–loss record: 38–52
- Earned run average: 5.07
- Strikeouts: 442

NPB statistics
- Win–loss record: 2–4
- Earned run average: 5.74
- Strikeouts: 16
- Stats at Baseball Reference

Teams
- Montreal Expos (1991–1992); Kansas City Royals (1992–1998); Chicago Cubs (1998); Cleveland Indians (1999–2000); Fukuoka Daiei Hawks (2001); Boston Red Sox (2002)

Christopher Deane Haney (born November 16, 1968) is an American former professional baseball left-handed pitcher. He pitched in Major League Baseball (MLB) from 1991–2000 and in 2002 for the Montreal Expos, Kansas City Royals, Chicago Cubs, Cleveland Indians, and Boston Red Sox.

Haney is the son of former catcher Larry Haney. He attended Orange County High School in Orange, Virginia. Haney pitched for the Charlotte 49ers and was the All-Sun Belt selection in both 1989 and 1990 and remains the program's leader with 20 complete games.

He was drafted by the Montreal Expos in the second round of the 1990 Major League Baseball draft. A year after signing, Haney made his major league debut for the Expos, and pitched for them for 1.5 years, then was traded to the Kansas City Royals on August 29, 1992 with Bill Sampen for Sean Berry and Archie Corbin.

Haney pitched for the Royals from 1992 to 1998. He had his best season in 1996, when he served as a full-time starter, finishing the year with a 10-14 record and a 4.67 earned run average.

On August 7, 1999, Wade Boggs of the Tampa Bay Devil Rays became the first major leaguer to hit a home run for his 3,000th hit, connecting against Haney. That October, Haney was left off the Indians' playoff roster. The decision to exclude him was blamed by some for the team's collapse against the Boston Red Sox in the 1999 American League Division Series.

In 2001, he played in Japan for the Fukuoka Daiei Hawks. After retiring from baseball, he returned to Orange, Virginia, the town where he grew up.

In 2002, Haney returned to MLB and pitched for the Red Sox. He made 24 appearances, all in relief. He did not pick up any wins but on June 5, 2002, he did pick up his one and only career save against the Tigers.

Haney's son, Jacob, pitched from 2017–2022 at the College of William & Mary.

== See also ==
- List of second-generation Major League Baseball players
