= Tom Runnells =

American baseball player, coach, and manager (born 1955)

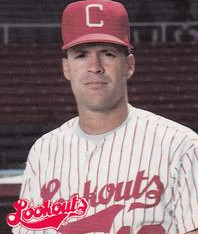
- Runnells in 1988
- Shortstop / Second baseman / Manager
- Born: April 17, 1955 (age 71); Greeley, Colorado, U.S.
- Batted: Switch Threw: Right

MLB debut
- August 10, 1985, for the Cincinnati Reds

Last MLB appearance
- June 6, 1986, for the Cincinnati Reds

MLB statistics
- Batting average: .174
- Hits: 8
- Managerial record: 68–81
- Winning %: .456
- Stats at Baseball Reference
- Managerial record at Baseball Reference

Teams
- As player: Cincinnati Reds (1985–1986); As manager: Montreal Expos (1991–1992); As coach: Montreal Expos (1990–1991); Colorado Rockies (2009–2016)

Thomas William Runnells (born April 17, 1955) is an American former infielder, coach and manager in Major League Baseball (MLB).

== Biography ==
Runnells attended the University of Northern Colorado and originally signed with the San Francisco Giants. He played parts of two seasons (1985–86) with the Cincinnati Reds, appearing in 40 games and batting .174 in 46 at bats without a home run or run batted in. He was a switch hitter who threw right-handed. Runnells began his managerial career with Cincinnati's AA Eastern League affiliate, the Vermont Reds, in 1987. In 1989, his Indianapolis Indians won the American Association championship and the "AAA Classic", earning him a promotion to a coaching position with the parent Montreal Expos.

On June 2, 1991, he was promoted again to manager of the Expos, who were lodged in last place in the National League East Division after 49 games. His time as Expos manager was short but tumultuous. Succeeding the very popular Buck Rodgers, he had trouble establishing his credibility with the media and the team. He was General Manager Dave Dombrowski's hand-picked man but failed to replicate his minor league success as the Expos finished the 1991 season in last place for the first time since 1976.

He then proceeded to try to shake up the team through various moves. Most notably, he shifted three-time Gold Glove winner Tim Wallach from third base to first base in order to clear a spot in the lineup for recently promoted prospect Bret Barberie. Although Runnells was harshly criticized for moving the popular Wallach, the move appeared to make some sense at the time. Barberie had seen time at all four infield positions while in the minors. However, he was blocked from second base (his best position) by Delino DeShields, didn't have the range to play shortstop, and wasn't physically capable of playing first base. Wallach was 33 years old and his best years appeared to be behind him, so it appeared logical to ease the transition by moving him to first and putting Barberie at third. However, both players got off to sluggish starts in April.

With a career major league managing record of 68-81 (.456), Runnells then returned to minor league baseball, managing in the farm systems of the Detroit Tigers and the Colorado Rockies. In the spring of 1995, Runnells managed the Tigers replacement players in spring training during the 1994–95 Major League Baseball strike.

On May 29, 2009. Runnells was promoted to Bench Coach of the Colorado Rockies when manager Clint Hurdle was fired and bench coach Jim Tracy replaced him. He retired from the Rockies after the 2016 season.

== Managerial statistics ==
| Team | Year | Regular Season | | | | Post Season | | | |
| Team | Year | Won | Lost | Win % | Finish | Won | Lost | Win % | Result |
|---|---|---|---|---|---|---|---|---|---|
| MON | 1991 | 51 | 61 | .455 | 6th in NL East | - | - | - | - |
| MON | 1992 | 17 | 20 | .459 | 2nd in NL East | - | - | - | - |
| Total | | 68 | 81 | .456 | | - | - | - | - |

Sporting positions
| Preceded by Marv Foley | Tulsa Drillers Manager; 2004–2005 | Succeeded by Stu Cole |
| Preceded by Marv Foley | Colorado Springs Sky Sox Manager; 2006–2009 | Succeeded by Stu Cole |
| Preceded by Jim Tracy | Colorado Rockies Bench Coach; 2009–2016 | Succeeded by Mike Redmond |
