= Jessie Hollins =

American baseball player (1970–2009)

- Pitcher
- Born: January 27, 1970; Conroe, Texas, U.S.
- Died: July 9, 2009 (aged 39); Piney Woods, Texas, U.S.
- Batted: Right Threw: Right

MLB debut
- September 19, 1992, for the Chicago Cubs

Last MLB appearance
- September 28, 1992, for the Chicago Cubs

MLB statistics
- Win–loss record: 0–0
- Earned run average: 13.50
- Innings pitched: 4.2
- Stats at Baseball Reference

Teams
- Chicago Cubs (1992)

Jessie Edward Hollins (January 27, 1970 – July 9, 2009) was a professional baseball player who was a pitcher in the Major Leagues in 1992. He appeared in four games for the Chicago Cubs, finishing three. Hollins' body was recovered floating in Lake Livingston on July 10, 2009, after he was reported missing on July 9 while fishing with his son, brother and nephews. Jessie was a father of four (Kendrick, Morgan, Jessie Jr. and Lillian)
