= Jeff Hartsock =

American baseball player (born 1966)

- Pitcher
- Born: November 19, 1966 (age 59); Fairfield, Ohio, U.S.
- Batted: Right Threw: Right

MLB debut
- September 12, 1992, for the Chicago Cubs

Last MLB appearance
- September 28, 1992, for the Chicago Cubs

MLB statistics
- Win–loss record: 0–0
- Earned run average: 6.75
- Strikeouts: 7
- Stats at Baseball Reference

Teams
- Chicago Cubs (1992)

Jeffrey Roger Hartsock (born November 19, 1966) is an American former Major League Baseball right-handed pitcher who played for the Chicago Cubs in 1992.

== Amateur career ==
A native of Fairfield, Ohio, Hartsock is an alumnus of North Carolina State University, where he played college baseball for the Wolfpack from 1986 to 1988. In 1987, he played collegiate summer baseball with the Orleans Cardinals of the Cape Cod Baseball League.

== Professional career ==
Hartsock was drafted by the Los Angeles Dodgers in the 7th round of the 1988 MLB draft. Prior to making his Major League debut, Hartsock would be traded to the Chicago Cubs for Steve Wilson on September 6, 1991. He would eventually make his Major League Baseball debut with the Chicago Cubs on September 12, 1992. Hartsock appeared in his final Major League game on September 28, 1992.
