= Nikco Riesgo =

American baseball player (born 1967)

- Outfielder
- Born: January 11, 1967 (age 59); Long Beach, California, U.S.
- Batted: Right Threw: Right

MLB debut
- April 20, 1991, for the Montreal Expos

Last MLB appearance
- April 26, 1991, for the Montreal Expos

MLB statistics
- Games: 4
- Plate appearances: 10
- Walks: 4
- Stats at Baseball Reference

Teams
- Montreal Expos (1991)

Damon Nikco Riesgo (born January 11, 1967) is an American former professional baseball outfielder. Riesgo played in Major League Baseball (MLB) for the Montreal Expos in 1991. He batted and threw right-handed.

== Career ==
Riesgo played college baseball at San Diego State where he was named a freshman All-American and, as a sophomore, had a .413 batting average and set a school record with 10 triples.

He was drafted by the San Diego Padres in the 8th round of the 1988 amateur draft.

Riesgo made his Major League debut on April 20, 1991 at Shea Stadium against the New York Mets and recorded his first and only hit in MLB, a line drive single off of Frank Viola. He would appear in a total of four games, drawing four walks in ten plate appearances, between his debut on April 20 and final game on April 26, 1991.

Riesgo served as a replacement player during the 1994–95 Major League Baseball strike for the Boston Red Sox but was released before the start of the 1995 season. He co-authored a book about his experiences during the strike entitled Strike Three! - A Player's Journey Through the Infamous Baseball Strike Of 1994.
