= Bill Risley =

American baseball player (born 1967)

- Pitcher
- Born: May 29, 1967 (age 59); Chicago, Illinois, U.S.
- Batted: Right Threw: Right

MLB debut
- July 8, 1992, for the Montreal Expos

Last MLB appearance
- September 26, 1998, for the Toronto Blue Jays

MLB statistics
- Win–loss record: 15–13
- Earned run average: 3.98
- Strikeouts: 203
- Stats at Baseball Reference

Teams
- Montreal Expos (1992–1993); Seattle Mariners (1994–1995); Toronto Blue Jays (1996–1998)

William Charles Risley (born May 29, 1967), is an American former professional baseball pitcher. He played in Major League Baseball (MLB) from 1992 to 1998 with the Montreal Expos, Seattle Mariners and Toronto Blue Jays.

== Career ==
Risley graduated from Marist High School in Chicago and attended Truman College before being drafted by the Cincinnati Reds in 1987. He was traded to Montreal in 1991.

He would be a relief pitcher throughout his MLB career. Yet in the second game of a doubleheader at Dodger Stadium on July 8, 1992, Risley's big-league debut turned out to also be his only time as a starter.

Pressed into duty by manager Felipe Alou when the Expos needed to play two doubleheaders against the Los Angeles Dodgers in three days, Risley was the winning pitcher, going five innings and allowing the Dodgers just four hits, with relievers Bill Sampen and Mel Rojas closing out a 4-1 victory.

That game turned out to be Risley's only appearance with Montreal during the 1992 season, and he was used just twice out of the bullpen in 1993, pitching in 41 games in the minors, before Montreal placed him on waivers. Risley was claimed by Seattle, where he became a reliable middle reliever on the Mariners' staff.

A career highlight came in 1995, when Risley pitched in the first four games of the American League division playoffs against the New York Yankees, earning a save in Game 4. Ace starter Randy Johnson's three innings of relief in an 11-inning victory in Game 5 sent Seattle on to the 1995 American League Championship Series, where Risley saw action again against the Cleveland Indians.

Risley was traded that December to the Toronto Blue Jays, where he spent the last three seasons of his career.
