= Sergio Valdez =

Dominican baseball player (born 1964)

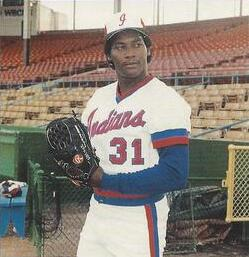
- Valdez with the Indianapolis Indians c. 1987
- Pitcher
- Born: September 7, 1964 (age 60); Elías Piña Province, Dominican Republic
- Batted: Right Threw: Right

MLB debut
- September 10, 1986, for the Montreal Expos

Last MLB appearance
- September 26, 1995, for the San Francisco Giants

MLB statistics
- Win–loss record: 12–20
- Earned run average: 5.06
- Strikeouts: 190
- Stats at Baseball Reference

Teams
- Montreal Expos (1986); Atlanta Braves (1989–1990); Cleveland Indians (1990–1991); Montreal Expos (1992–1993); Boston Red Sox (1994); San Francisco Giants (1995)

Sergio Valdez (born September 7, 1964) is a Dominican former professional baseball pitcher in Major League Baseball who played from 1986 through 1995 with the Montreal Expos (1986, 1992–93), the Atlanta Braves (1989–90), the Cleveland Indians (1991–92), the Boston Red Sox (1994), and San Francisco Giants (1995).

== Career ==
On September 10, 1986, Valdez made his major league debut against the New York Mets giving up five earned runs and nine hits through six innings to record his first major league loss. In 1986, he started five games and lost four of them.

He returned to the majors after leaving in 1989 as a reliever, starting just one in 19 appearances, and earning a 6.06 ERA with a 1-2 record.

He was selected off waivers from the Braves by the Indians on April 30, 1990. The Indians used him as a starter and reliever (13 of 24 appearances with the Indians were starts) and overall that year he went 6-6 with a 4.85 ERA.

He had his best year in 1992, when he went 0-2 with a 2.41 ERA. His WHIP was a microscopic 0.991. However, in 1993 he only pitched three innings.

The Giants used Valdez as a starter once again, despite his having been used as a reliever throughout most of his career. He went 4-5 with a 4.75 ERA.
