= Doug Piatt =

American baseball player (born 1965)

- Pitcher
- Born: September 26, 1965 (age 60); Beaver, Pennsylvania, U.S.
- Batted: Left Threw: Right

MLB debut
- June 11, 1991, for the Montreal Expos

Last MLB appearance
- October 6, 1991, for the Montreal Expos

MLB statistics
- Win–loss record: 0–0
- Earned run average: 2.60
- Strikeouts: 29
- Stats at Baseball Reference

Teams
- Montreal Expos (1991)

Douglas William Piatt (born September 26, 1965) is an American former Major League Baseball pitcher. He appeared in 21 games for the Montreal Expos in 1991, all in relief. After posting a 2.60 earned run average and striking out 29 batters in 34 2/3 innings, Piatt never received another chance in the major leagues. He continued to pitch in the minor leagues until 1997, finishing his career with the independent Waterbury Spirit.

== Sources ==
- Career statistics from Baseball Reference · Baseball Reference (Minors) · Retrosheet · Baseball Almanac
