= Brian Barnes (baseball) =

American baseball player (born 1967)

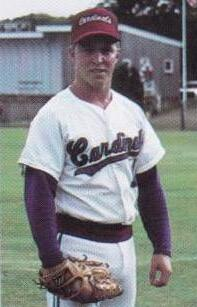
- Barnes with the Orleans Cardinals in 1988
- Pitcher
- Born: March 25, 1967 (age 58); Roanoke Rapids, North Carolina, U.S.
- Batted: Left Threw: Left

MLB debut
- September 14, 1990, for the Montreal Expos

Last MLB appearance
- July 1, 1994, for the Los Angeles Dodgers

MLB statistics
- Win–loss record: 14–22
- Earned run average: 3.94
- Strikeouts: 275
- Stats at Baseball Reference

Teams
- Montreal Expos (1990–1993); Cleveland Indians (1994); Los Angeles Dodgers (1994)

Brian Keith Barnes (born March 25, 1967) is an American former Major League Baseball left-handed pitcher who played from 1990 to 1994 with the Montreal Expos, Cleveland Indians, and Los Angeles Dodgers.

Barnes attended Clemson University. In 1988 he played collegiate summer baseball with the Orleans Cardinals of the Cape Cod Baseball League and was named a league all-star. He was selected by the Expos in the 4th round of the 1989 MLB draft.
