= Chris Nabholz =

American baseball player (born 1967)

- Pitcher
- Born: January 5, 1967 (age 59); Harrisburg, Pennsylvania, U.S.
- Batted: Left Threw: Left

MLB debut
- June 11, 1990, for the Montreal Expos

Last MLB appearance
- August 8, 1995, for the Chicago Cubs

MLB statistics
- Won–loss record: 37–35
- Earned run average: 3.94
- Strikeouts: 405
- Stats at Baseball Reference

Teams
- Montreal Expos (1990–1993); Cleveland Indians (1994); Boston Red Sox (1994); Chicago Cubs (1995)

Christopher William Nabholz (born January 5, 1967) is an American former starting pitcher in Major League Baseball who played for the Montreal Expos (1990–1993), Cleveland Indians (1994), Boston Red Sox (1994) and Chicago Cubs (1995). He batted and threw left-handed. Nabholz made it to the Major Leagues after 45 minor league starts.

== Biography ==
Nabholz grew up in Pennsylvania and idolized Steve Carlton as a youth. He graduated from Pottsville Area High School in 1985.

He enrolled at Towson University; although he "didn't put up astronomical numbers" for the Tigers, he was named Most Valuable Player of the 1988 East Coast Conference Tournament.

In a six-season career, Nabholz posted a 37-35 record with 405 strikeouts and a 3.94 ERA in 611 2/3 innings pitched.

== Sources ==
- Career statistics from Baseball Reference · Baseball Reference (Minors) · Retrosheet · Baseball Almanac
