= Jonathan Hurst =

American baseball player (born 1966)

- Pitcher
- Born: October 20, 1966 (age 59); New York, New York, U.S.
- Batted: Right Threw: Right

Professional debut
- MLB: June 9, 1992, for the Montreal Expos
- CPBL: July 24, 1998, for the Mercuries Tigers
- NPB: April 1, 2001, for the Yakult Swallows

Last appearance
- MLB: April 21, 1994, for the New York Mets
- NPB: August 10, 2001, for the Yakult Swallows
- CPBL: October 18, 2005, for the Brother Elephants

MLB statistics
- Win–loss record: 1–2
- Earned run average: 8.20
- Strikeouts: 10

CPBL statistics
- Win–loss record: 76–52
- Earned run average: 2.55
- Strikeouts: 779

NPB statistics
- Win–loss record: 1–1
- Earned run average: 5.97
- Strikeouts: 13
- Stats at Baseball Reference

Teams
- Montreal Expos (1992); New York Mets (1994); Mercuries Tigers (1998–1999); Brother Elephants (2000); Yakult Swallows (2001); Brother Elephants (2002–2005)

Career highlights and awards
- 2x Taiwan Series champion (2002-2003)

Jonathan Hurst (born October 20, 1966) is an American former professional baseball pitcher who played for the Montreal Expos (1992) and New York Mets (1994) of Major League Baseball (MLB). He's been the pitching coach of New York Mets minor league affiliates since 2006.

== Career ==
=== Early life and draft ===
Prior to playing professionally, Hurst attended Spartanburg High School in Spartanburg, South Carolina and then Spartanburg Methodist College. He was drafted three times by major league teams: in 1986, he was selected by the Seattle Mariners in the ninth round of the January draft, however he opted not to sign. That same year, he was drafted by the Cincinnati Reds in the second round of the June Secondary draft, however he once again did not sign. In 1987, he was taken in the fourth round of the 1987 regular draft by the Texas Rangers and did sign.

On July 21, 1991, he was traded by the Rangers with a player to be named later (minor league pitcher Travis Buckley, who was sent on September 1, 1991) and Joey Eischen to the Expos for Oil Can Boyd.

=== Major league career ===
Hurst made his major league debut on June 9, 1992, for the Montreal Expos at the age of 25. He made three starts for the Expos in his first big league season, going 1–1 with a 5.51 ERA. In 16 1/3 innings, he allowed 18 hits, walked seven batters and struck out four.

He pitched in the Expos organization until 1993, when he was selected off waivers by the Los Angeles Dodgers on June 2. He was released by the Dodgers following the season and was signed by the Mets on December 16.

He pitched in seven games for the Mets in 1994, going 0–1 with a 12.60 ERA. He allowed 15 hits in 10 innings, while striking out six batters and walking five. He played his final major league game on April 21, 1994.

Overall, he went 1–2 with an 8.20 ERA in 10 games (three starts).

=== Minor league career ===
Hurst pitched in the minor leagues from 1987 to 1994 and again in 1998, going 51–38 with a 3.63 ERA in 206 games (110 starts). He pitched in the Rangers' (1987–1991, 1998), Expos' (1991–1993), Dodgers' (1993) and Mets' (1994) organizations.

He showed some flashes of excellence throughout his minor league career. For example, he went 4–3 with a 1.88 ERA and 59 strikeouts in 57 1/3 innings in his very first professional season, spent with the GCL Rangers. The following year, he went 2–0 with a 1.64 ERA in 13 games (four starts), as he struck out 35 batters in 33 innings for three teams. In 1991, he went 15–3 with a 2.27 ERA in 26 games (23 starts).

Prior to the 1992 season, he was ranked by Baseball America as the 91st best prospect in all of baseball.

=== Yakult Swallows ===
Hurst pitched for the Yakult Swallows in 2001, going 1–1 with a 5.97 ERA in 22 games (two starts). In 34 2/3 innings, he allowed 43 hits, while walking 11 batters and striking out 13.

=== Brother Elephants ===
He also pitched for the Brother Elephants of the Chinese Professional Baseball League and in the Mexican League.

=== Post-playing career ===
Hurst has been a pitching coach in the minor leagues since 2006. In 2006, he worked for the GCL Mets. He was with the Savannah Sand Gnats in 2007 and 2008, from 2009 to 2015 he coached for the Kingsport Mets, and in 2016 he began coaching for the Columbia Fireflies, the Mets Single A South Atlantic League affiliate in Columbia, South Carolina.
