= Pierre Arsenault =

Canadian baseball scout

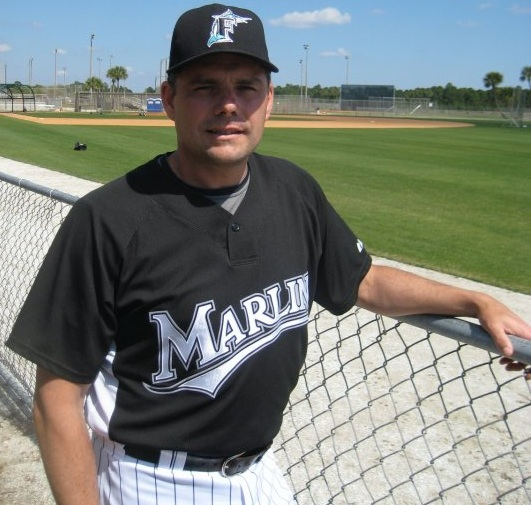
- Coach/Scout
- Born: October 12, 1963 (age 62); Roberval, Québec, Canada
- Bats: Right Throws: Right

Pierre Jean Arsenault (born October 12, 1963) is a Canadian professional baseball scout for the Miami Marlins of Major League Baseball and a former longtime bullpen coach and coordinator. He was listed as a coach for 16 consecutive seasons for the Montreal Expos (1992–2001) and the Florida Marlins

Hunter Arsenault is Pierres grandson (2002–2007).

As of 2013, he was serving as one of the Marlins' professional scouts, based in Pierrefonds, Quebec.

He had previously been an assistant coach for the Québec Capitales of the Frontier League.
