= Mark Gardner (baseball) =

American baseball player and coach (born 1962)

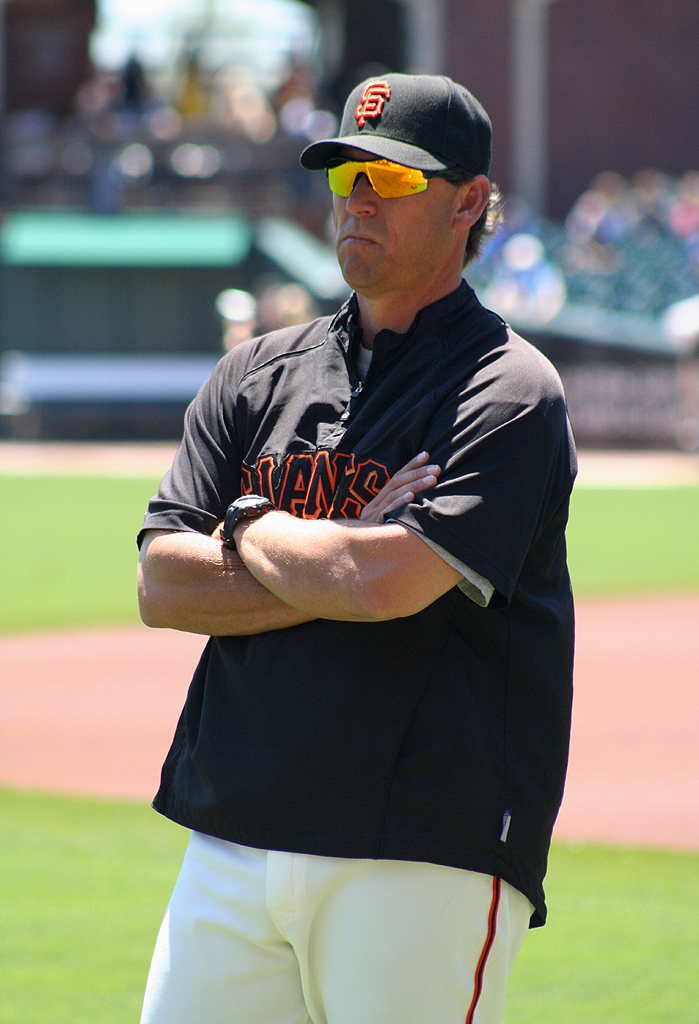
- Gardner with the San Francisco Giants
- Pitcher
- Born: March 1, 1962 (age 64); Los Angeles, California, U.S.
- Batted: Right Threw: Right

MLB debut
- May 16, 1989, for the Montreal Expos

Last MLB appearance
- October 7, 2001, for the San Francisco Giants

MLB statistics
- Win–loss record: 99–93
- Earned run average: 4.56
- Strikeouts: 1,256
- Stats at Baseball Reference

Teams
- As player: Montreal Expos (1989–1992); Kansas City Royals (1993); Florida Marlins (1994–1995); San Francisco Giants (1996–2001); As coach: San Francisco Giants (2003–2017)

Career highlights and awards
- 3× World Series champion (2010, 2012, 2014)
Medals
Men's baseball
Representing United States
Amateur World Series
Bronze medal – third place	1984 Cuba	Team

Mark Allan Gardner (born March 1, 1962) is an American former pitcher in Major League Baseball. He pitched for the Montreal Expos, Kansas City Royals, Florida Marlins and San Francisco Giants and also coached for the Giants.

== Professional career ==
Gardner pitched in the Major Leagues from 1989 to 2001 for the Montreal Expos, Kansas City Royals, Florida Marlins, and the San Francisco Giants. In his career, Gardner pitched in 345 games, posting a record of 99–93 and a 4.56 ERA. He appeared in 275 of his 345 career games as a starter. Gardner was also used as a long reliever and spot starter during the final years of his career.

On July 26, 1991, Gardner no hit the Los Angeles Dodgers for nine innings but gave up two hits to start the bottom of the 10th (Jeff Fassero gave up the game-winning hit to Darryl Strawberry, the very next batter, but Gardner took the loss) and lost 1–0. Two nights later, his teammate Dennis Martinez threw a perfect game against the Los Angeles Dodgers.

On September 3, 1995, Gardner notched his only save in the major leagues when he pitched the bottom of the 11th for the Miami Marlins to nail down an 8-7 victory over the Houston Astros.

Gardner played the last six seasons of his career with the San Francisco Giants.

He shared the 2001 Willie Mac Award with catcher Benito Santiago, recognizing each of them for their spirit and leadership.

== Coaching career ==
One season after retiring, Gardner became the San Francisco Giants' bullpen coach in 2003. He remained in the position until 2017 and was a member of three World Series championship teams.

== Personal life ==
Gardner attended Clovis High School in Clovis, California, and California State University, Fresno, where he met his wife, Lori Gardner, an All-American softball pitcher. He and Lori have two sons. Lori Gardner struggled with liver cancer for several years during her husband's tenure with the San Francisco Giants before dying from the disease in 2003. The Gardner family remains active in the Donate Life America organization.
