= Bill Sampen =

American baseball player (born 1963)

- Pitcher
- Born: January 18, 1963 (age 63); Lincoln, Illinois, U.S.
- Batted: Right Threw: Right

MLB debut
- April 10, 1990, for the Montreal Expos

Last MLB appearance
- May 9, 1994, for the California Angels

MLB statistics
- Win–loss record: 25–21
- Earned run average: 3.73
- Strikeouts: 176
- Stats at Baseball Reference

Teams
- Montreal Expos (1990–1992); Kansas City Royals (1992–1993); California Angels (1994)

William Albert Sampen (born January 18, 1963) is a former professional baseball player who pitched in Major League Baseball from 1990–1994. Sampen owns an instructional baseball program in Brownsburg known as "Samp's Hack Shack.” In 2016, Sampen founded the Indiana Expos youth travel baseball program.

== Career ==
In his first season, Sampen had a record of 12-7 and led the 1990 Montreal Expos in victories on a pitching staff that included Dennis Martínez, Oil Can Boyd and Kevin Gross. He made his MLB debut at age 27 on April 10, 1990, with two innings of one-hit relief in a 4-2 loss to the St. Louis Cardinals.

Sampen went 9-5 the following season, but had just four MLB victories thereafter. He was traded by the Expos to the Kansas City Royals on Aug. 29, 1992, and was out of baseball by 1994.

== Personal life ==
Sampen resides in Brownsburg, Indiana. His son, Caleb, played college baseball at Wright State University and was drafted in the 20th round of the 2018 MLB draft by the Los Angeles Dodgers.

He attended Hartsburg-Emden High School in central Illinois.
