= 1999 Atlanta Braves season =

Major League Baseball season

1999 Atlanta Braves
- National League champions National League East champions
- League: National League
- Division: East
- Ballpark: Turner Field
- City: Atlanta
- Record: 103–59 (.636)
- Divisional place: 1st
- Owners: Time Warner
- General managers: John Schuerholz
- Managers: Bobby Cox
- Television: WTBS; WUPA; TBS Superstation (Pete Van Wieren, Skip Caray, Don Sutton, Joe Simpson); Fox Sports South (Ernie Johnson, Bob Rathbun)
- Radio: WSB (AM) (Pete Van Wieren, Skip Caray, Don Sutton, Joe Simpson)

The 1999 Atlanta Braves season marked the franchise's 34th season in Atlanta and its 129th season overall. The Braves commenced the season as consecutive National League runner-ups and clinched their eighth successive division title with a record of 103–59, holding a 6-game lead over the New York Mets. During the 1990s, the Braves reached the World Series for the fifth time. However, they were swept in all four games of the 1999 World Series by the New York Yankees. This marked their second World Series appearance against the Yankees in a span of four years, with the previous one occurring in 1996, which they lost in six games. The Braves wouldn't return to the World Series until 22 years later.

Two pivotal figures on the 1999 Braves roster were Chipper Jones and John Rocker. Jones earned the National League's Most Valuable Player award, boasting a .310 batting average, 45 home runs, and 110 RBIs. He solidified his claim to the award with his remarkable performances in September against the New York Mets. John Rocker, functioning as Atlanta's closer, notched 38 saves. However, he ignited controversy due to his racist and homophobic remarks in a December 27, 1999, Sports Illustrated article.

This season marked the concluding campaign for John Smoltz as a starting pitcher, including the final full season for the pitching trio referred to as the Big Three. Smoltz would sit out the subsequent season due to Tommy John surgery but returned in 2001 in a closer role, a position he would uphold until returning to the starting role in 2005.

== Offseason ==
- November 10, 1998: Bret Boone was traded by the Cincinnati Reds with Mike Remlinger to the Atlanta Braves for Rob Bell, Denny Neagle, and Michael Tucker.
- December 1, 1998: Otis Nixon was signed as a free agent with the Atlanta Braves.
- December 1, 1998: Curtis Pride was released by the Atlanta Braves.

== Regular season ==
=== Opening Day starters ===
- Otis Nixon – LF
- Bret Boone – 2B
- Chipper Jones – 3B
- Brian Jordan – RF
- Javy López – C
- Ryan Klesko – 1B
- Andruw Jones – CF
- Walt Weiss – SS
- Tom Glavine – P

=== Season standings ===
NL East
Team	W	L	Pct.	GB	Home	Road
Atlanta Braves	103	59	.636	—	56‍–‍25	47‍–‍34
New York Mets	97	66	.595	6½	49‍–‍32	48‍–‍34
Philadelphia Phillies	77	85	.475	26	41‍–‍40	36‍–‍45
Montreal Expos	68	94	.420	35	35‍–‍46	33‍–‍48
Florida Marlins	64	98	.395	39	35‍–‍45	29‍–‍53

=== Record vs. opponents ===
1999 National League record Source: MLB Standings Grid – 1999
Team	AZ	ATL	CHC	CIN	COL	FLA	HOU	LAD	MIL	MON	NYM	PHI	PIT	SD	SF	STL	AL
Arizona	—	4–5	7–2	1–8	6–7	8–1	5–4	7–6	5–4	6–3	7–2	8–1	5–2	11–2	9–3	4–4	7–8
Atlanta	5–4	—	2–5	8–1	5–4	9–4	6–1	5–4	5–2	9–4	9–3	8–5	6–3	5–4	4–5	8–1	9–9
Chicago	2–7	5–2	—	5–8	4–5	6–3	3–9	2–7	6–6	2–5	3–6	2–7	7–6	6–3	1–7	7–5	6–9
Cincinnati	8–1	1–8	8–5	—	7–2	6–1	9–4	4–3	6–6	4–3	5–5	6–3	7–6	6–3	4–5	8–4	7–8
Colorado	7–6	4–5	5–4	2–7	—	5–4	2–6	8–5	6–3	6–3	4–5	5–4	2–7	4–9	4–9	4–5	4–8
Florida	1–8	4–9	3–6	1–6	4–5	—	2–7	7–2	5–4	8–4	3–10	2–11	3–4	3–6	4–5	3–4	11–7
Houston	4–5	1–6	9–3	4–9	6–2	7–2	—	6–3	8–5	7–2	4–5	6–1	5–7	8–1	5–4	5–7	12–3
Los Angeles	6–7	4–5	7–2	3–4	5–8	2–7	3–6	—	7–2	5–4	4–4	6–3	3–6	3–9	8–5	3–6	8–7
Milwaukee	4–5	2–5	6–6	6–6	3–6	4–5	5–8	2–7	—	5–4	2–5	5–4	8–4	3–5	4–5	7–6	8–6
Montreal	3–6	4–9	5–2	3–4	3–6	4–8	2–7	4–5	4–5	—	5–8	6–6	3–6	5–3	4–5	5–4	8–10
New York	2–7	3–9	6–3	5–5	5–4	10–3	5–4	4–4	5–2	8–5	—	6–6	7–2	7–2	7–2	5–2	12–6
Philadelphia	1–8	5–8	7–2	3–6	4–5	11–2	1–6	3–6	4–5	6–6	6–6	—	3–4	6–3	2–6	4–5	11–7
Pittsburgh	2–5	3–6	6–7	6–7	7–2	4–3	7–5	6–3	4–8	6–3	2–7	4–3	—	3–6	4–5	7–5	7–8
San Diego	2–11	4–5	3–6	3–6	9–4	6–3	1–8	9–3	5–3	3–5	2–7	3–6	6–3	—	5–7	2–7	11–4
San Francisco	3–9	5–4	7–1	5–4	9–4	5–4	4–5	5–8	5–4	5–4	2–7	6–2	5–4	7–5	—	6–3	7–8
St. Louis	4–4	1–8	5–7	4–8	5–4	4–3	7–5	6–3	6–7	4–5	2–5	5–4	5–7	7–2	3–6	—	7–8

=== Transactions ===
- July 3, 1999: Pete Orr was signed by the Atlanta Braves as an amateur free agent.

=== Roster ===
1999 Atlanta Braves
**Roster**
**Pitchers**: 38 Sean Bergman; 42 Micah Bowie; 38 Mike Cather; 48 Bruce Chen; 51 David Cortés; 50 Derrin Ebert; 47 Tom Glavine; 28 John Hudek; 31 Greg Maddux; 30 Kevin McGlinchy; 34 Kevin Millwood; 43,45 Terry Mulholland; 45 Odalis Pérez; 37 Mike Remlinger; 49 John Rocker; 40 Rudy Seánez; 29 John Smoltz; 32 Justin Speier; 36 Russ Springer; 56 Everett Stull; 51 Joe Winkelsas; 43 Mark Wohlers	**Catchers**: 4 Jorge Fábregas; 8 Javy López; 11 Pascual Matos; 28 Greg Myers; 12 Eddie Pérez; **Infielders**: 9,51 Howard Battle; 24 Bret Boone; 2 Mark DeRosa; 20 Freddy García; 13 Ozzie Guillén; 16 José Hernández; 19 Brian Hunter; 10 Chipper Jones; 18 Ryan Klesko; 7 Keith Lockhart; 15 Randall Simon; 22 Walt Weiss	**Outfielders**: 25 Andruw Jones; 33 Brian Jordan; 26 George Lombard; 1 Otis Nixon; 27 Gerald Williams	**Manager**: 6 Bobby Cox; **Coaches**: 23 Don Baylor (hitting); 39 Pat Corrales (bench); 52 Bobby Dews (bullpen); 16,17 Glenn Hubbard (1st base); 54 Leo Mazzone (pitching); 5 Ned Yost (3rd base)

=== Game log ===
1999 Game Log: 103–59 (Home: 56–25; Away: 47–34)
April: 15–7 (Home: 7–4; Away: 8–3)

#	Date	Opponent	Score	Win	Loss	Save	Attendance	Record
1	April 5	Phillies	4–7	Schilling (1–0)	**Glavine** (0–1)	Brantley (1)	47,522	0–1
2	April 6	Phillies	11–3	**Maddux** (1–0)	Ogea (0–1)	**Ebert** (1)	29,183	1–1
3	April 7	Phillies	4–0	**Smoltz** (1–0)	Loewer (0–1)	—	32,164	2–1
4	April 8	Phillies	3–6	Byrd (1–0)	**Millwood** (0–1)	Brantley (2)	47,225	2–2
5	April 9	Diamondbacks	3–2 (10)	**Rocker** (1–0)	Frascatore (0–2)	—	34,939	3–2
6	April 10	Diamondbacks	3–8	Johnson (1–0)	**Glavine** (0–2)	—	44,531	3–3
7	April 11	Diamondbacks	3–2	**McGlinchy** (1–0)	Olson (0–1)	—	32,454	4–3
8	April 12	@ Phillies	8–6	**Cather** (1–0)	Ryan (0–1)	**Seanez** (1)	37,582	5–3
9	April 14	@ Phillies	10–4	**Millwood** (1–1)	Byrd (1–1)	—	16,287	6–3
–	April 15	@ Phillies	Postponed (rain); rescheduled for July 23					
–	April 16	@ Rockies	Postponed (snow); rescheduled for August 19					
10	April 17	@ Rockies	4–5	McElroy (1–0)	**Rocker** (1–1)	—	42,510	6–4
11	April 18	@ Rockies	20–5	**Maddux** (2–0)	Astacio (0–2)	—	44,285	7–4
12	April 19	@ Dodgers	11–3	**Smoltz** (2–0)	C. Perez (0–3)	—	31,454	8–4
13	April 20	@ Dodgers	4–5	Dreifort (3–0)	**Millwood** (1–2)	Shaw (4)	37,717	8–5
14	April 21	@ Dodgers	11–4 (12)	**Remlinger** (1–0)	Kubenka (0–1)	—	31,902	9–5
15	April 23	@ Marlins	1–9	Hernandez (1–2)	**Glavine** (0–3)	—	21,713	9–6
16	April 24	@ Marlins	8–7	**Maddux** (3–0)	Edmondson (0–1)	**Rocker** (1)	32,591	10–6
17	April 25	@ Marlins	5–1	**Smoltz** (3–0)	Meadows (3–1)	—	28,636	11–6
18	April 26	@ Marlins	5–3	**Seanez** (1–0)	Alfonseca (0–3)	—	15,397	12–6
19	April 27	Pirates	3–5	Schmidt (3–1)	**O. Perez** (0–1)	Williams (3)	26,990	12–7
20	April 28	Pirates	5–4	**Glavine** (1–3)	Christiansen (1–2)	—	29,615	13–7
21	April 29	Pirates	8–1	**Maddux** (4–0)	Silva (0–1)	—	32,017	14–7
22	April 30	Reds	3–0	**Smoltz** (4–0)	Avery (1–2)	—	36,923	15–7

May: 16–13 (Home: 10–6; Away: 6–7)

#	Date	Opponent	Score	Win	Loss	Save	Attendance	Record
23	May 1	Reds	5–1	**Millwood** (2–2)	Harnisch (2–3)	—	47,097	16–7
24	May 2	Reds	5–3	**O. Perez** (1–1)	Neagle (0–1)	**Rocker** (2)	42,036	17–7
25	May 3	Cardinals	4–2	**Remlinger** (2–0)	Jimenez (2–2)	**Rocker** (3)	37,676	18–7
26	May 4	Cardinals	1–9	Aybar (2–0)	**Maddux** (4–1)	—	39,161	18–8
27	May 5	Cardinals	12–3	**Smoltz** (5–0)	Bottenfield (4–1)	—	44,350	19–8
28	May 7	@ Padres	3–4	Boehringer (1–1)	**Rocker** (1–2)	Hoffman (4)	26,765	19–9
29	May 8	@ Padres	11–1	**Glavine** (2–3)	Ashby (4–2)	—	52,973	20–9
30	May 9	@ Padres	0–5	Hitchcock (3–1)	**Maddux** (4–2)	—	23,711	20–10
31	May 10	@ Giants	1–4	Ortiz (5–2)	**Smoltz** (5–1)	Nen (12)	14,694	20–11
32	May 11	@ Giants	9–8 (12)	**Rocker** (2–2)	Rodriguez (0–2)	—	18,917	21–11
33	May 12	@ Giants	1–5	Brock (4–2)	**Millwood** (2–3)	—	18,550	21–12
34	May 14	@ Cubs	0–9	Lieber (4–1)	**Glavine** (2–4)	—	40,046	21–13
35	May 15	@ Cubs	1–5	Trachsel (2–4)	**Maddux** (4–3)	—	40,332	21–14
36	May 16	@ Cubs	8–5	**McGlinchy** (2–0)	Myers (2–1)	**Rocker** (4)	39,915	22–14
37	May 17	Pirates	2–1	**Millwood** (3–3)	Ritchie (2–3)	**Rocker** (5)	30,673	23–14
38	May 18	Pirates	12–4	**O. Perez** (2–1)	Schmidt (4–3)	—	30,858	24–14
39	May 19	Pirates	7–3	**Glavine** (3–4)	Cordova (0–2)	—	34,106	25–14
40	May 20	Cubs	5–6 (12)	Serafini (1–0)	**McGlinchy** (2–1)	—	38,588	25–15
41	May 21	Cubs	4–8	Adams (1–1)	**McGlinchy** (2–2)	—	48,315	25–16
42	May 22	Cubs	4–2	**Millwood** (4–3)	Tapani (3–2)	**Rocker** (6)	49,077	26–16
43	May 23	Cubs	1–5	Mulholland (3–1)	**O. Perez** (2–2)	—	48,782	26–17
44	May 24	@ Brewers	7–10	Woodard (4–4)	**Glavine** (3–5)	—	14,913	26–18
45	May 25	@ Brewers	5–2	**Seanez** (2–0)	Wickman (2–2)	**Rocker** (7)	15,286	27–18
46	May 26	@ Brewers	3–2 (10)	**Seanez** (3–0)	Weathers (4–1)	**Rocker** (8)	18,460	28–18
47	May 27	@ Brewers	8–7	**Millwood** (5–3)	Karl (5–3)	**Seanez** (2)	22,252	29–18
48	May 28	Dodgers	4–2	**O. Perez** (3–2)	Dreifort (5–3)	**Rocker** (9)	41,953	30–18
49	May 29	Dodgers	1–2	C. Perez (2–6)	**Glavine** (3–6)	Shaw (11)	49,258	30–19
50	May 30	Dodgers	4–5 (11)	Borbon (1–1)	**Remlinger** (2–1)	Shaw (12)	47,166	30–20
51	May 31	Rockies	3–1	**Millwood** (6–3)	Astacio (4–5)	**Rocker** (10)	34,136	31–20

June: 16–11 (Home: 8–6; Away: 8–5)

#	Date	Opponent	Score	Win	Loss	Save	Attendance	Record
52	June 1	Rockies	7–2	**Smoltz** (6–1)	Jones (1–4)	—	30,297	32–20
53	June 2	Rockies	2–3 (11)	Dipoto (2–2)	**Springer** (0–1)	—	32,429	32–21
54	June 4	@ Red Sox	1–5	Martínez (11–1)	**Glavine** (3–7)	—	33,411	32–22
55	June 5	@ Red Sox	6–5	**Maddux** (5–3)	Gordon (0–1)	**Rocker** (11)	32,793	33–22
56	June 6	@ Red Sox	3–2 (10)	**Seanez** (4–0)	Portugal (3–4)	**Rocker** (12)	32,184	34–22
57	June 7	Devil Rays	9–5	**Smoltz** (7–1)	Eiland (0–2)	**Rocker** (13)	36,731	35–22
58	June 8	Devil Rays	11–2	**Perez** (4–2)	Alvarez (2–4)	—	35,709	36–22
59	June 9	Devil Rays	4–3 (12)	**McGlinchy** (3–2)	White (4–1)	—	35,160	37–22
60	June 11	Orioles	2–6	Ponson (6–4)	**Maddux** (5–4)	—	47,428	37–23
61	June 12	Orioles	0–5	Guzman (3–4)	**Millwood** (6–4)	—	47,923	37–24
62	June 13	Orioles	1–22	Mussina (8–3)	**Smoltz** (7–2)	—	45,738	37–25
63	June 14	@ Astros	4–10	Hampton (8–2)	**Perez** (4–3)	Miller (1)	28,243	37–26
64	June 15	@ Astros	4–3	**Glavine** (4–7)	Elarton (4–2)	**Rocker** (14)	27,941	38–26
65	June 16	@ Astros	3–1	**Maddux** (6–4)	Bergman (4–3)	**Rocker** (15)	27,756	39–26
66	June 17	@ Astros	8–5	**Millwood** (7–4)	Lima (11–3)	**Seanez** (3)	39,477	40–26
67	June 18	@ Diamondbacks	6–0	**Smoltz** (8–2)	Benes (4–7)	—	41,499	41–26
68	June 19	@ Diamondbacks	3–7	Daal (7–4)	**Perez** (4–4)	—	46,726	41–27
69	June 20	@ Diamondbacks	10–4	**Glavine** (5–7)	Johnson (9–3)	—	47,235	42–27
70	June 22	Expos	1–2	Thurman (3–4)	**Maddux** (6–5)	Urbina (15)	37,768	42–28
71	June 23	Expos	7–3	**Millwood** (8–4)	Batista (6–4)	—	32,186	43–28
72	June 24	Expos	3–2 (11)	**McGlinchy** (4–2)	Mota (1–2)	—	42,341	44–28
73	June 25	Mets	2–10	Reed (6–3)	**Perez** (4–5)	—	48,292	44–29
74	June 26	Mets	7–2	**Glavine** (6–7)	Dotel (0–1)	—	48,293	45–29
75	June 27	Mets	1–0	**Maddux** (7–5)	Yoshii (6–6)	**Rocker** (16)	46,092	46–29
76	June 28	@ Expos	13–5	**Millwood** (9–4)	Batista (6–5)	—	7,078	47–29
77	June 29	@ Expos	5–6	Urbina (4–4)	**Rocker** (2–3)	—	7,069	47–30
78	June 30	@ Expos	5–7	Kline (2–2)	**McGlinchy** (4–3)	Urbina (17)	7,273	47–31

July: 16–12 (Home: 8–4; Away: 8–8)

#	Date	Opponent	Score	Win	Loss	Save	Attendance	Record
79	July 1	@ Expos	4–1	**Glavine** (7–7)	Smith (1–3)	—	8,874	48–31
80	July 2	@ Mets	16–0	**Maddux** (8–5)	Yoshii (6–7)	—	51,979	49–31
81	July 3	@ Mets	3–0	**Millwood** (10–4)	Leiter (7–6)	**Rocker** (17)	43,256	50–31
82	July 4	@ Mets	6–7	Cook (7–1)	**Smoltz** (8–3)	Benitez (4)	32,699	50–32
83	July 5	Marlins	6–5	**McGlinchy** (5–3)	Alfonseca (4–5)	—	37,506	51–32
84	July 6	Marlins	2–5	Fernandez (3–5)	**Glavine** (7–8)	Mantei (10)	32,665	51–33
85	July 7	Marlins	7–3	**Maddux** (9–5)	Dempster (4–5)	—	35,610	52–33
86	July 8	Marlins	5–2	**Millwood** (11–4)	Meadows (6–10)	—	36,606	53–33
87	July 9	Red Sox	4–5	Saberhagen (6–2)	**Chen** (0–1)	Wakefield (10)	49,636	53–34
88	July 10	Red Sox	2–1 (11)	**Seanez** (5–0)	Wasdin (7–3)	—	47,871	54–34
89	July 11	Red Sox	8–1	**Maddux** (10–5)	Cho (2–2)	—	46,680	55–34
**70th All-Star Game in Boston, Massachusetts**
90	July 15	@ Yankees	6–2	**Glavine** (8–8)	Clemens (8–4)	—	49,087	56–34
91	July 16	@ Yankees	10–7	**R. Springer** (1–1)	Rivera (2–3)	**Rocker** (18)	50,469	57–34
92	July 17	@ Yankees	4–11	Pettitte (6–7)	**Perez** (4–6)	Grimsley (1)	55,785	57–35
93	July 18	@ Blue Jays	2–3	Hamilton (2–5)	**Millwood** (11–5)	Koch (15)	31,137	57–36
94	July 19	@ Blue Jays	7–8 (10)	Frascatore (5–4)	**Hudek** (0–2)	—	31,064	57–37
95	July 20	@ Blue Jays	6–11	Halladay (7–3)	**Glavine** (8–9)	—	28,366	57–38
96	July 21	@ Marlins	0–2	D. Springer (5–10)	**Maddux** (10–6)	—	15,509	57–39
97	July 22	@ Marlins	6–3	**McGlinchy** (6–3)	Fernandez (4–6)	**Rocker** (19)	17,759	58–39
98	July 23 (1)	@ Phillies	5–6	Telemaco (2–0)	**Seanez** (5–1)	Gomes (14)	N/A	58–40
99	July 23 (2)	@ Phillies	3–1	**Chen** (1–1)	Shumaker (0–1)	**Rocker** (20)	32,673	59–40
100	July 24	@ Phillies	3–4	Montgomery (1–3)	**Bowie** (0–1)	Gomes (15)	30,167	59–41
101	July 25	@ Phillies	5–4 (10)	**Rocker** (3–3)	Montgomery (1–4)	—	25,659	60–41
102	July 26	Brewers	6–1	**Maddux** (11–6)	Karl (7–9)	—	38,534	61–41
103	July 27	Brewers	10–2	**Millwood** (12–5)	Nomo (9–3)	—	38,582	62–41
104	July 28	Brewers	4–10	Pulsipher (3–1)	**Chen** (1–2)	—	39,432	62–42
105	July 30	Phillies	2–9	Byrd (12–6)	**Smoltz** (8–4)	—	48,605	62–43
106	July 31	Phillies	8–6	**Glavine** (9–9)	Person (5–5)	**Rocker** (21)	50,203	63–43

August: 21–7 (Home: 12–1; Away: 9–6)

#	Date	Opponent	Score	Win	Loss	Save	Attendance	Record
107	August 1	Phillies	12–4	**Maddux** (12–6)	Wolf (5–3)	—	37,521	64–43
108	August 3	@ Pirates	1–7	Benson (9–8)	**Millwood** (12–6)	—	17,154	64–44
109	August 4	@ Pirates	2–3	Ritchie (10–7)	**Smoltz** (8–5)	Williams (16)	17,625	64–45
110	August 5	@ Pirates	6–3	**Remlinger** (3–1)	Hansell (1–2)	**Rocker** (22)	19,078	65–45
111	August 6	Giants	7–3	**Maddux** (13–6)	Estes (7–7)	—	49,321	66–45
112	August 7	Giants	15–4	**Mulholland** (7–6)	Ortiz (12–8)	—	47,798	67–45
113	August 8	Giants	2–5	Rueter (10–6)	**Millwood** (12–7)	Nen (25)	38,026	67–46
114	August 9	Astros	5–3	**Seanez** (6–1)	Henry (1–2)	**Rocker** (23)	40,072	68–46
115	August 10	Astros	6–4	**Glavine** (10–9)	Reynolds (14–8)	**Rocker** (24)	38,303	69–46
116	August 11	Astros	8–5	**Maddux** (14–6)	Lima (15–7)	**Rocker** (25)	39,578	70–46
117	August 13	@ Dodgers	7–3	**Millwood** (13–7)	Dreifort (9–12)	—	40,363	71–46
118	August 14	@ Dodgers	1–8	Brown (14–6)	**Smoltz** (8–6)	—	53,533	71–47
119	August 15	@ Dodgers	5–4 (11)	**Remlinger** (4–1)	Arnold (2–3)	**Rocker** (26)	41,606	72–47
120	August 16	@ Rockies	14–6	**Maddux** (15–6)	Jones (6–10)	—	47,519	73–47
121	August 17	@ Rockies	2–3	Lee (2–0)	**Mulholland** (7–7)	Veres (23)	47,904	73–48
122	August 18	@ Rockies	1–4	Veres (3–5)	**Rocker** (3–4)	—	46,553	73–49
123	August 19	@ Rockies	9–7 (14)	**Chen** (2–2)	Lee (2–1)	**Mulholland** (1)	41,791	74–49
124	August 20	Padres	4–3 (11)	**Remlinger** (5–1)	Reyes (2–4)	—	48,201	75–49
125	August 21	Padres	6–2	**Maddux** (16–6)	Ashby (11–7)	—	48,362	76–49
126	August 22	Padres	3–2	**Rocker** (4–4)	Miceli (4–4)	—	33,847	77–49
127	August 23	Reds	6–2	**Millwood** (14–7)	Tomko (4–7)	**Springer** (1)	31,016	78–49
128	August 24	Reds	6–4	**Smoltz** (9–6)	Harnisch (13–7)	**Rocker** (27)	38,049	79–49
129	August 25	Reds	5–2	**Glavine** (11–9)	Neagle (3–5)	**Rocker** (28)	30,822	80–49
130	August 27	@ Cardinals	2–1	**Springer** (2–1)	Acevedo (5–5)	**Rocker** (29)	46,723	81–49
131	August 28	@ Cardinals	3–0 (13)	**Remlinger** (6–1)	Painter (3–5)	**Rocker** (30)	48,068	82–49
132	August 29	@ Cardinals	4–3 (12)	**McGlinchy** (7–3)	Acevedo (5–6)	—	45,559	83–49
133	August 30	@ Reds	3–11	Neagle (4–5)	**Glavine** (11–10)	—	24,619	83–50
134	August 31	@ Reds	8–2	**Maddux** (17–6)	Guzman (9–11)	—	25,238	84–50

September: 17–8 (Home: 9–3; Away: 8–5)

#	Date	Opponent	Score	Win	Loss	Save	Attendance	Record
135	September 1	@ Reds	8–7	**Mulholland** (8–7)	Villone (7–5)	**Rocker** (31)	23,977	85–50
136	September 3	Diamondbacks	7–3	**Millwood** (15–7)	Reynoso (10–3)	—	38,389	86–50
137	September 4	Diamondbacks	4–5	Benes (10–11)	**Smoltz** (9–7)	Mantei (26)	48,730	86–51
138	September 5	Diamondbacks	5–7	Olson (6–4)	**Rocker** (4–5)	Mantei (27)	44,549	86–52
139	September 6	Cardinals	4–1	**Maddux** (18–6)	Stephenson (5–1)	—	41,678	87–52
140	September 7	Cardinals	3–2	**Remlinger** (7–1)	Oliver (7–9)	—	35,095	88–52
141	September 8	Cardinals	5–4	**Millwood** (16–7)	Ankiel (0–1)	**Rocker** (32)	36,454	89–52
142	September 10	@ Giants	4–2	**Remlinger** (8–1)	Ortiz (16–9)	**Rocker** (33)	23,150	90–52
143	September 11	@ Giants	2–3	Rueter (14–8)	**Glavine** (11–11)	Nen (33)	35,981	90–53
144	September 12	@ Giants	4–8	Nathan (6–3)	**Maddux** (18–7)	—	44,402	90–54
145	September 13	@ Padres	0–3	Williams (9–12)	**Mulholland** (8–8)	Hoffman (37)	15,718	90–55
146	September 14	@ Padres	11–4	**Millwood** (17–7)	Carlyle (1–2)	—	18,068	91–55
147	September 15	@ Padres	1–4	Clement (9–12)	**Smoltz** (9–8)	Hoffman (38)	18,177	91–56
148	September 17	Expos	6–5 (10)	**Remlinger** (9–1)	Kline (6–4)	—	39,512	92–56
149	September 18	Expos	3–4	Hermanson (9–12)	**Maddux** (18–8)	Urbina (38)	47,576	92–57
150	September 19	Expos	5–1	**Millwood** (18–7)	Lilly (0–1)	—	41,817	93–57
151	September 21	Mets	2–1	**Remlinger** (10–1)	Cook (10–5)	**Rocker** (34)	43,948	94–57
152	September 22	Mets	5–2	**Glavine** (12–11)	Hershiser (13–11)	**Rocker** (35)	47,520	95–57
153	September 23	Mets	6–3	**Maddux** (19–8)	Leiter (11–12)	**Rocker** (36)	49,228	96–57
154	September 24	@ Expos	4–3 (10)	**Bergman** (5–6)	Mota (2–4)	**Remlinger** (1)	8,969	97–57
155	September 25	@ Expos	5–3	**Mulholland** (9–8)	Vazquez (8–8)	**Rocker** (37)	11,584	98–57
156	September 26	@ Expos	10–0	**Smoltz** (10–8)	Powell (3–8)	—	12,582	99–57
157	September 28	@ Mets	9–3	**Glavine** (13–11)	Hershiser (13–12)	—	43,888	100–57
158	September 29	@ Mets	2–9	Leiter (12–12)	**Maddux** (19–9)	—	43,922	100–58
159	September 30	@ Mets	4–3 (11)	**Mulholland** (10–8)	Dotel (8–3)	—	48,364	101–58

October: 2–1 (Home: 2–1; Away: 0–0)

#	Date	Opponent	Score	Win	Loss	Save	Attendance	Record
160	October 1	Marlins	4–1	**Smoltz** (11–8)	Meadows (11–15)	**Rocker** (38)	38,413	102–58
161	October 2	Marlins	0–1 (10)	Looper (3–3)	**Ebert** (0–1)	Alfonseca (21)	45,394	102–59
162	October 3	Marlins	18–0	**Glavine** (14–11)	Springer (6–16)	—	40,570	103–59

Legend: = Win = Loss
Bold = Braves team member

== Player stats ==
=== Batting ===
==== Starters by position ====
Note: Pos = Position; G = Games played; AB = At bats; H = Hits; Avg. = Batting average; HR = Home runs; RBI = Runs batted in

Pos	Player	G	AB	H	Avg.	HR	RBI
C	Eddie Pérez	104	309	77	.249	7	30
1B	Ryan Klesko	133	404	120	.297	21	80
2B	Bret Boone	152	608	153	.252	20	63
SS	Walt Weiss	110	279	63	.226	2	29
3B	Chipper Jones	157	567	181	.319	45	110
LF	Gerald Williams	143	422	116	.275	17	68
CF	Andruw Jones	162	592	163	.275	26	84
RF	Brian Jordan	153	576	163	.283	23	115

==== Other batters ====
Note: G = Games played; AB = At bats; H = Hits; Avg. = Batting average; HR = Home runs; RBI = Runs batted in

Player	G	AB	H	Avg.	HR	RBI
Javy López	65	246	78	.317	11	45
Ozzie Guillén	92	232	56	.241	1	20
Randall Simon	90	218	69	.317	5	25
Brian Hunter	114	181	45	.249	6	30
José Hernández	48	166	42	.253	4	19
Keith Lockhart	108	161	42	.261	1	21
Otis Nixon	84	151	31	.205	0	8
Greg Myers	34	72	16	.222	2	9
Howard Battle	15	17	6	.353	1	5
Pascual Matos	6	8	1	.125	0	2
Mark DeRosa	7	8	0	.000	0	0
Jorge Fábregas	6	8	0	.000	0	0
George Lombard	6	6	2	.333	0	0
Freddy García	2	2	1	.500	1	1

=== Pitching ===
==== Starting pitchers ====
Note: G = Games pitched; IP = Innings pitched; W = Wins; L = Losses; ERA = Earned run average; SO = Strikeouts

Player	G	IP	W	L	ERA	SO
Tom Glavine	35	234.0	14	11	4.12	138
Kevin Millwood	33	228.0	18	7	2.68	205
Greg Maddux	33	219.1	19	9	3.57	136
John Smoltz	29	186.1	11	8	3.19	156
Odalis Pérez	18	93.0	4	6	6.00	82

==== Other pitchers ====
Note: G = Games pitched; IP = Innings pitched; W = Wins; L = Losses; ERA = Earned run average; SO = Strikeouts

Player	G	IP	W	L	ERA	SO
Terry Mulholland	16	60.1	4	2	2.98	39
Bruce Chen	16	51.0	2	2	5.47	45

==== Relief pitchers ====
Note: G = Games pitched; W = Wins; L = Losses; SV = Saves; ERA = Earned run average; SO = Strikeouts

Player	G	W	L	SV	ERA	SO
John Rocker	74	4	5	38	2.49	104
Mike Remlinger	73	10	1	1	2.37	81
Kevin McGlinchy	64	7	3	0	2.82	67
Rudy Seánez	56	6	1	3	3.35	41
Russ Springer	49	2	1	1	3.42	49
Justin Speier	19	0	0	0	5.65	22
John Hudek	15	0	1	0	6.48	18
Sean Bergman	6	1	0	0	2.84	6
Derrin Ebert	5	0	1	1	5.63	4
David Cortés	4	0	0	0	4.91	2
Mike Cather	4	1`	0	0	10.13	0
Micah Bowie	3	0	1	0	13.50	2
Mark Wohlers	2	0	0	0	27.00	0
Everett Stull	1	0	0	0	13.50	0
Joe Winkelsas	1	0	0	0	54.00	0

== Postseason ==
=== Game log ===
1999 Postseason Game Log
National League Division Series: 3–1

#	Date	Opponent	Score	Win	Loss	Save	Attendance	Record
1	October 5	Astros	1–6	Reynolds (1–0)	Maddux (0–1)	—	39,119	0–1
2	October 6	Astros	5–1	Millwood (1–0)	Lima (0–1)	—	41,913	1–1
3	October 8	@ Astros	5–3 (12)	Rocker (1–0)	Powell (0–1)	Millwood (1)	48,625	2–1
4	October 9	@ Astros	7–5	Smoltz (1–0)	Reynolds (1–1)	Rocker (1)	48,553	3–1

National League Championship Series: 4–2

#	Date	Opponent	Score	Win	Loss	Save	Attendance	Record
1	October 12	Mets	4–2	Maddux (1–1)	Yoshii (0–1)	Rocker (2)	44,172	1–0
2	October 13	Mets	4–3	Millwood (2–0)	Rogers (0–2)	Smoltz (1)	44,624	2–0
3	October 15	@ Mets	1–0	Glavine (1–0)	Leiter (0–1)	Rocker (3)	55,911	3–0
4	October 16	@ Mets	2–3	Wendell (2–0)	Remlinger (0–1)	Benitez (1)	55,872	3–1
5	October 17	@ Mets	3–4 (15)	Dotel (1–0)	McGlinchy (0–1)	—	55,723	3–2
6	October 19	Mets	10–9 (11)	Springer (1–0)	Rogers (0–3)	—	52,335	4–2

World Series: 0–4

#	Date	Opponent	Score	Win	Loss	Save	Attendance	Record
1	October 23	Yankees	1–4	Hernandez (3–0)	Maddux (1–2)	Rivera (5)	51,342	0–1
2	October 24	Yankees	2–7	Cone (2–0)	Millwood (2–1)	—	51,226	0–2
3	October 26	@ Yankees	5–6 (10)	Rivera (2–0)	Remlinger (0–2)	—	56,794	0–3
4	October 27	@ Yankees	1–4	Clemens (2–1)	Smoltz (1–1)	Rivera (6)	56,752	0–4

=== Postseason rosters ===
Playoff rosters
National League League Division Series

- Pitchers: 47 Tom Glavine 31 Greg Maddux 30 Kevin McGlinchy 34 Kevin Millwood 45 Terry Mulholland 37 Mike Remlinger 49 John Rocker 29 John Smoltz 36 Russ Springer
- Catchers: 12 Eddie Pérez
- Infielders: 9 Howard Battle 24 Bret Boone 13 Ozzie Guillén 16 José Hernández 19 Brian Hunter 10 Chipper Jones 18 Ryan Klesko 7 Keith Lockhart 22 Walt Weiss
- Outfielders: 25 Andruw Jones 33 Brian Jordan 1 Otis Nixon 27 Gerald Williams

National League League Championship Series

- Pitchers: 47 Tom Glavine 31 Greg Maddux 30 Kevin McGlinchy 34 Kevin Millwood 45 Terry Mulholland 37 Mike Remlinger 49 John Rocker 29 John Smoltz 36 Russ Springer
- Catchers: 4 Jorge Fábregas 28 Greg Myers 12 Eddie Pérez
- Infielders: 9 Howard Battle 24 Bret Boone 13 Ozzie Guillén 16 José Hernández 19 Brian Hunter 10 Chipper Jones 18 Ryan Klesko 7 Keith Lockhart 22 Walt Weiss
- Outfielders: 25 Andruw Jones 33 Brian Jordan 1 Otis Nixon 27 Gerald Williams

World Series

- Pitchers: 47 Tom Glavine 31 Greg Maddux 30 Kevin McGlinchy 34 Kevin Millwood 45 Terry Mulholland 37 Mike Remlinger 49 John Rocker 29 John Smoltz 36 Russ Springer
- Catchers: 4 Jorge Fábregas 28 Greg Myers 12 Eddie Pérez
- Infielders: 9 Howard Battle 24 Bret Boone 13 Ozzie Guillén 16 José Hernández 19 Brian Hunter 10 Chipper Jones 18 Ryan Klesko 7 Keith Lockhart 22 Walt Weiss
- Outfielders: 25 Andruw Jones 33 Brian Jordan 1 Otis Nixon 27 Gerald Williams

== Award winners ==
- Andruw Jones, OF, Gold Glove for center field
- Chipper Jones, National League Most Valuable Player Award
- Chipper Jones, 3B, Silver Slugger Award
- Greg Maddux, P, Gold Glove Award
- John Smoltz, Pitcher of the Month Award, April

1999 Major League Baseball All-Star Game

- Brian Jordan, OF, reserve
- Kevin Millwood, P, reserve

== Farm system ==
Level	Team	League	Manager
AAA	Richmond Braves	International League	Randy Ingle
AA	Greenville Braves	Southern League	Paul Runge
A	Myrtle Beach Pelicans	Carolina League	Brian Snitker
A	Macon Braves	South Atlantic League	Jeff Treadway
A-Short Season	Jamestown Jammers	New York–Penn League	Jim Saul
Rookie	Danville Braves	Appalachian League	J. J. Cannon
Rookie	GCL Braves	Gulf Coast League	Rick Albert

LEAGUE CO-CHAMPIONS: Myrtle Beach
