= Walk-off home run =

In baseball, a home run in the final inning that ends the game

In baseball, a walk-off home run is a home run that ends the game. For a home run to end the game, it must be hit in the bottom of the final inning and generate enough runs to exceed the opponent's score. Because the opponent will not have an opportunity to score any more runs, there is no need to finish the inning and the team on defense will "walk off" the field while the player who hit the home run is rounding the bases. The winning runs must still touch all three bases and be counted at home plate. A variant of the walk-off home run, the walk-off grand slam, occurs when a grand slam exceeds the opponent's score in the bottom of the final inning and ends the game.

== History and usage of the term ==
Although the concept of a game-ending home run is as old as baseball, the adjective "walk-off" attained widespread use only in the late 1990s and early 2000s.

The first known usage of the word in print appeared in the San Francisco Chronicle on April 21, 1988, Section D, Page 1. Chronicle writer Lowell Cohn wrote an article headlined "What the Eck?" about Oakland reliever Dennis Eckersley's unusual way of speaking: "For a translation, I go in search of Eckersley. I also want to know why he calls short home runs 'street pieces,' and home runs that come in the last at-bat of a game 'walkoff pieces' ..." Although the term originally was coined with a negative connotation, in reference to the pitcher (who must "walk off" the field with his head hung in shame), it has come to acquire a more celebratory connotation, for the batter who circles the bases with pride and with the adulation of the home crowd.

Jim Thome holds the MLB record for most career walk-off home runs with 13, the first being hit on June 15, 1994, and the last (which broke the previous record of 12) on June 23, 2012. Most notably, he hit his 500th career home run for a walk-off home run. Freddie Freeman is both the only player to hit multiple walk off home runs in the World Series and the only player with a World Series walk-off grand slam.

=== Other types of "walk-off" wins ===
Sportscasters have applied the term "walk-off hit" to any kind of hit that drives in the winning run to end the game. It is an expansion of the term to call a hit a walk-off when what ends the game is not the hit, but the defense's failure to make a play. The terms "walk-off hit by pitch", "walk-off walk" (a base on balls with the bases loaded), "walk-off wild pitch", "walk-off reach-on-error", "walk-off steal of home", "walk-off passed ball", "walk-off balk" (the latter being dubbed a "balk-off"), and even "walk-off catcher's interference" have also been applied. The day after Eric Bruntlett executed a game-ending unassisted triple play for the Philadelphia Phillies against the New York Mets on August 23, 2009, the Philadelphia Daily News used the term "walk-off triple play" in a subheadline describing the moment, although it was not a true walk-off.

=== Walk-off grand slam ===
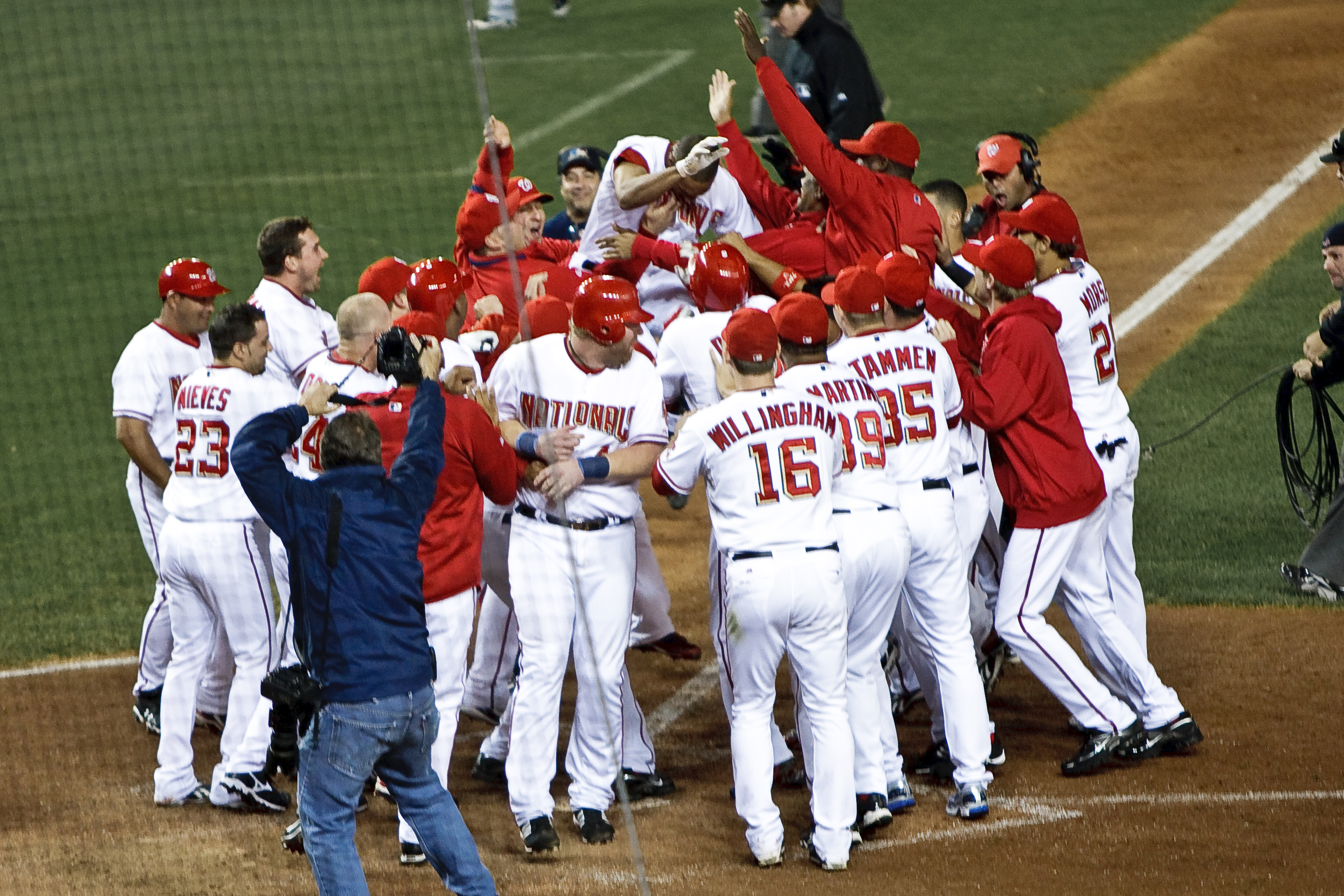
The Washington Nationals celebrate a walk-off grand slam hit by Justin Maxwell in 2009.

A grand slam is a home run hit with all three bases occupied by baserunners ("bases loaded"), thereby scoring four runs—the most possible in one play. A walk-off home run with the bases loaded is therefore known as a walk-off grand slam. Since 1916 there have been more than 250 walk-off grand slams hit during Major League Baseball's regular season.

Since its institution in 1903, only two walk-off grand slams have been recorded in the postseason. The first was in Game 2 of the 2011 ALCS, by Nelson Cruz of the Texas Rangers. The second playoff grand slam was hit by Freddie Freeman of the Los Angeles Dodgers in Game 1 of the 2024 World Series. In Game 5 of the 1999 NLCS, Robin Ventura of the New York Mets hit a game-winning home run with the bases loaded against the Atlanta Braves, but as only the Mets player on third base – Roger Cedeño – reached home before the Mets started their on-field celebration, the play was officially recorded as a single.

Three players have hit two walk-off grand slams in a season: Cy Williams in 1926, Jim Presley in 1986, and Steve Pearce in 2017. Pearce's first was on July 27 (an 8–4 victory over the Oakland Athletics) followed by his second on July 30 (an ultimate grand slam, for an 11–10 win over the Los Angeles Angels), becoming the first player in MLB history to hit multiple walk-off grand slams within the span of a single week.

==== Ultimate grand slam ====
A walk-off grand slam that erases a three-run deficit is also called an ultimate grand slam. There have been 35 such instances documented in major league history – all taking place during the regular season, 17 of those coming with two outs. Of the 35 home runs, only Roberto Clemente's was hit inside the park, at spacious Forbes Field on July 25, 1956. (Note: The source for this frequently cited factoid is Madison McEntire's 2006 book, Big League Trivia; Facts, Figures, Oddities, and Coincidences from our National Pastime. (Indeed, as late as July 23 of that year, two days prior to the home run's 50th anniversary, an eyewitness account written by Pittsburgh-based sportswriter John Steigerwald stated merely that it "may have been done only once in the history of baseball." [Emphasis added.]) However, the claim, as it appears on page 53, and has since been repeated extensively, in print and online (i.e. "Clemente is the only player to end a game with an inside-the-park grand slam."), is actually qualified (along with most of the book's items) by McEntire in the book's introduction. "Unless stated otherwise, I used the year 1900 – the beginning of the modern baseball era – as the starting point for the items in this book.") Pirates manager/third base coach Bobby Bragan instructed him to stop at third, but Clemente "ran through the stop sign" to score the winning run. Del Crandall's September 11, 1955, Alan Trammell's June 21, 1988, and Chris Hoiles' May 17, 1996 grand slams occurred under the most dire situation possible: bases loaded, two outs, full count, bottom of the ninth inning, and down by three runs.

The most recent ultimate grand slam was hit by Kody Clemens on July 30, 2026, in the Minnesota Twins' 4-3 victory over the Kansas City Royals.

=== Walk-off celebrations ===
Walk-off celebrations typically consist of an entire baseball team leaving the dugout to meet a player at home plate after the batter hits a walk-off home run, or at whichever base the hitter happens to reach if a traditional base hit results in a walk-off victory.

A walk-off celebration may involve hitters jumping on home plate before being encircled and caught by their teammates. During a walk-off celebration on May 29, 2010, Kendrys Morales, then a member of the Los Angeles Angels of Anaheim, broke his left leg from jumping on home plate while celebrating a walk-off grand slam off of the Seattle Mariners. As a result of this injury, team manager Mike Scioscia instituted new guidelines for his team that ensured a much tamer response to all subsequent walk-off victories.

== Relevant rules ==
The rules of baseball provide that:

- A batter is entitled to a home run only "when he shall have touched all bases legally." (Rule 5.05(a)(5); also 5.06(b)(4)(A))
- A batter is out, on appeal, for failing to touch each base in order or for passing a preceding runner. In some cases, all runs that score are negated. (Rule 5.09(b)(9), 5.09(c)(2) and 5.09(d))
- On a game-winning hit, a batter is credited for the full number of bases only if "the batter runs out his hit." (Rule 9.06(f))
- A game-winning home run is allowed to complete before the game ends, even if it puts the home team ahead by more than one run. (Rule 7.01(g)(3), Exception; also 9.06(g))

The first point above was problematic in the 1976 American League Championship Series between the New York Yankees and the Kansas City Royals. The Yankees and Royals entered the bottom of the ninth inning of the decisive fifth game with the score tied, 6–6; Mark Littell was the pitcher for Kansas City, and Chris Chambliss was the first batter for New York. Chambliss hit Littell's first pitch into the right field bleachers to win the game and the American League pennant for the Yankees. However, Yankees fans ran onto the field at Yankee Stadium to celebrate the victory, and prevented Chambliss from rounding the bases and touching home plate. Recognizing the impossibility of Chambliss successfully negotiating the sea of people who had been on the field, umpires later escorted Chambliss back out to home plate and watched as he touched it with his foot, thereby making the Yankees victory "official". (A comment to Rule 5.08(b) permits the umpires to award the run if fans prevent the runner from touching home plate.)

The third point above led to Robin Ventura's "Grand Slam Single" in Game 5 of the 1999 NLCS. In the bottom of the 15th inning, the New York Mets tied the score against the Atlanta Braves at 3–3. Ventura came to bat with the bases loaded, and hit a game-winning grand slam to deep right. Roger Cedeño scored from third and John Olerud appeared to score from second, but Todd Pratt, on first base when Ventura hit the home run, went to second, then turned around and hugged Ventura as the rest of the team rushed onto the field. The official ruling was that because Ventura never advanced past first base, it was not a home run but a single, and thus only Cedeño's run counted, making the official final score 4–3.

The fourth point above was not a rule prior to 1920; instead, the game ended at the moment the winning run scored. This rule affected the scoring of 40 hits, from 1884 to 1918, that would now be scored as game-winning home runs. (Note: The following players that hit a game-winning home run that was not scored as such included: Al McCauley, Babe Ruth, Bill Coughlin, Bill Lange, Buck Ewing, Charlie Irwin, Chick Stahl, Cy Seymour, Doc Crandall, Duke Farrell, Ed Gremminger, Home Run Baker, Fred Mann, George Van Haltren, George Wood, Ginger Beaumont, Hardy Richardson, Irish Meusel, Jimmy Collins (2), Joe Tinker, King Kelly, Lou Bierbauer, Mike Griffin, Mike Tiernan, Parke Wilson, Pat Moran, Paul Hines, Ping Bodie, Roger Bresnahan, Roger Connor, Sam Thompson, Sherry Magee (2), Tex Erwin, Tim Jordan and Tommy McCarthy.)

Babe Ruth would have been credited with 715 career home runs had the modern rule been in effect in 1918; in a 10-inning game on July 8 with a runner on first base, Ruth's fence-clearing, walk-off RBI hit was scored a triple because the game was deemed over when the lead baserunner reached home.

== List of walk-off home runs in the postseason and All-Star Game ==
In the charts below, home runs that ended a postseason series are denoted by the series standing in bold. Home runs in which the winning team was trailing at the time are denoted by the final score in bold. Grand slams are denoted by the situation in bold.

=== World Series ===
Year	Game	Batter	Site	Pitcher	Situation	Final score	Series standing	Notes
1949	Game 1, October 5	Tommy Henrich, N.Y. Yankees	Yankee Stadium	Don Newcombe, Brooklyn	0–0, 9th 0 out 0 on	1–0	1–0 NYY	Henrich's blast leading off the ninth was the first game-winning home run in Series history, and provided the game's only run.
1954	Game 1, September 29	Dusty Rhodes, N.Y. Giants	Polo Grounds	Bob Lemon, Cleveland	2–2, 10th 1 out 2 on	5–2	1–0 NYG	Rhodes' three-run pinch-hit homer with one out in the tenth is not as well remembered as Willie Mays' spectacular over-the-shoulder catch earlier in the game.
1957	Game 4, October 6	Eddie Mathews, Milwaukee	County Stadium	Bob Grim, N.Y. Yankees	5–5, 10th 1 out 1 on	7–5	2–2	Mathews hits a two-run shot with one out in the tenth inning to tie the Series.
1960	Game 7, October 13	Bill Mazeroski, Pittsburgh	Forbes Field	Ralph Terry, N.Y. Yankees	9–9, 9th 0 out 0 on	10–9	**4–3 PIT**	Leading off the ninth, Mazeroski homers to end the Series, giving the Pirates their first championship since 1925. It is the only Game 7 game-winning home run in World Series history. After Forbes Field was demolished, the section of the left-field wall where the home run left the park was moved to the Pirates' new home of Three Rivers Stadium, and still later was moved to their current home, PNC Park. A line of bricks marks that section of the wall, next to a preserved wall section, and a plaque indicating the spot where Mazeroski's homer left the park is embedded in the current sidewalk.
1964	Game 3, October 10	Mickey Mantle, N.Y. Yankees	Yankee Stadium	Barney Schultz, St. Louis	1–1, 9th 0 out 0 on	2–1	2–1 NYY	Mantle hits a home run on the first pitch of the ninth for a Yankee victory.
1975	Game 6, October 21	Carlton Fisk, Boston	Fenway Park	Pat Darcy, Cincinnati	6–6, 12th 0 out 0 on	7–6	3–3	Fisk's home run to lead off the 12th inning, high off the left-field foul pole above the Green Monster, ties the Series in one of the best remembered moments in the sport's history. The homer arguably changed the way televised sports are covered; because camera operators missed a cue from the producer, the camera lingered on Fisk trying to "wave his home run fair." This image of Fisk proved so dramatic that "reaction shots" became standard fare in sports broadcasting.
1988	Game 1, October 15	Kirk Gibson, Los Angeles	Dodger Stadium	Dennis Eckersley, Oakland	3–4, 9th 2 out 1 on	**5–4**	1–0 LAD	The injured and hobbling Gibson, later named the NL MVP, makes his only Series appearance with a pinch-hit, two-run, two-out home run for the underdog Dodgers, marking the first game-winning Series home run by a team that trailed at the time. Oakland's José Canseco had provided all his team's scoring with a second-inning grand slam. Jack Buck, who called the game for CBS Radio, exclaimed "I don't believe what I just saw!" as Gibson circled the bases.
1988	Game 3, October 18	Mark McGwire, Oakland	Oakland–Alameda County Coliseum	Jay Howell, Los Angeles	1–1, 9th 1 out 0 on	2–1	2–1 LAD	McGwire's home run with one out gives Oakland its only win in the Series. It is the first time that two game-winning home runs are hit in the same post-season series.
1991	Game 6, October 26	Kirby Puckett, Minnesota	Hubert H. Humphrey Metrodome	Charlie Leibrandt, Atlanta	3–3, 11th 0 out 0 on	4–3	3–3	Puckett, who had made a game-saving defensive play earlier in this game, leads off the 11th inning with a homer to tie the Series, as Jack Buck told the nation on CBS, "We'll see you... tomorrow night!" In addition, Puckett falls a double short of hitting for the cycle, getting two singles, a triple, and the homer.
1993	Game 6, October 23	Joe Carter, Toronto	SkyDome	Mitch Williams, Philadelphia	5–6, 9th 1 out 2 on	**8–6**	**4–2 TOR**	Carter hit a three-run homer with one out to give Toronto its second consecutive championship. Radio sportscaster Tom Cheek's call of "Touch 'em all Joe, you'll never hit a bigger home run in your life!" would go down as one of the most iconic moments in Toronto sports history. This is the most recent time that the World Series title was decided on a walk-off home run.
1999	Game 3, October 26	Chad Curtis, N.Y. Yankees	Yankee Stadium	Mike Remlinger, Atlanta	5–5, 10th 0 out 0 on	6–5	3–0 NYY	Curtis leads off the tenth inning with his second home run of the evening to give the Yankees a commanding Series lead.
2001	Game 4, October 31	Derek Jeter, N.Y. Yankees	Yankee Stadium	Byung-hyun Kim, Arizona	3–3, 10th 2 out 0 on	4–3	2–2	Jeter's homer with two out in the tenth ties the Series in the first-ever Series at-bat by any player in the month of November (just after midnight on November 1); the series had been delayed because of the September 11, 2001 attacks. It also gave him the nickname of "Mr. November".
2003	Game 4, October 22	Álex González, Florida	Pro Player Stadium	Jeff Weaver, N.Y. Yankees	3–3, 12th 0 out 0 on	4–3	2–2	González, who had five hits in 53 at-bats in the postseason and one hit in 13 at-bats in the World Series, hits a home run on a full count to lead off the 12th inning, tying the Series and shifting momentum to Florida for the remainder of the Series.
2005	Game 2, October 23	Scott Podsednik, Chi. White Sox	U.S. Cellular Field	Brad Lidge, Houston	6–6, 9th 1 out 0 on	7–6	2–0 CHW	After Paul Konerko hits a grand slam to give Chicago a 6–4 lead in the seventh, and Houston ties it in the ninth, Podsednik, who had not homered in 129 games in the regular season, hits one to right-center with one out to win it.
2011	Game 6, October 27	David Freese, St. Louis	Busch Stadium	Mark Lowe, Texas	9–9, 11th 0 out 0 on	10–9	3–3	After Texas had taken the lead in the ninth and tenth innings by two runs each, the Cardinals rallied twice to keep the score tied in the bottom of the tenth. Jake Westbrook pitched a scoreless 11th inning to set up David Freese's solo walk-off home run to tie the series and force Game 7, which the Cardinals won. Fox play-by-play commentator Joe Buck echoed his late father Jack's call of Kirby Puckett's home run from the 1991 World Series, saying, "...we will see you tomorrow night!" Puckett's and Freese's home runs occurred under similar circumstances: 1) both happened during Game 6 of the World Series, and 2) both men were the first batter of the eleventh inning. The home runs were hit twenty years and a day apart from each other.
2018	Game 3, October 26	Max Muncy, L.A. Dodgers	Dodger Stadium	Nathan Eovaldi, Boston	2–2, 18th 0 out 0 on	3–2	2–1 BOS	After missing a home run by a few feet in the 15th inning, Muncy hit a full count pitch over the left field wall off Eovaldi leading off the bottom of the 18th inning, giving the Dodgers the win and ending the longest World Series game in history in terms of innings (18) and time (7 hours, 20 mins), exactly 30 years after the Kirk Gibson walk-off homered at the opener in the 1988 World Series against the Oakland Athletics when Dennis Eckersley pitched the full count in the bottom of the ninth inning.
2023	Game 1, October 27	Adolis García, Texas	Globe Life Field	Miguel Castro, Arizona	5-5, 11th 1 out 0 on	6–5	1–0 TEX	After Texas tied at the bottom of the ninth with a two run home run by Corey Seager, the game went into extra innings. At the bottom of the eleventh with one out, Adolis García hit a home run, breaking the single postseason runs batted in record which was previously held by David Freese of the St. Louis Cardinals. This coincidentally happened twelve years to the day after Freese's own walk-off home run against Texas to end Game 6 of the 2011 World Series. García became the first American Leaguer to hit the walk-off home run in the World Series game since Scott Podsednik of the Chicago White Sox in game two of the 2005 World Series and the second Latin American player to do so since the Florida Marlin shortstop, Álex González who homered off Jeff Weaver of the New York Yankees in the fourth game of the 2003 World Series.
2024	Game 1, October 25	Freddie Freeman, Los Angeles	Dodger Stadium	Nestor Cortés Jr., N.Y. Yankees	**2–3, 10th** **2 out** **3 on**	**6–3**	1–0 LAD	Trailing 3–2 and down to the final out with the bases loaded in the bottom of the 10th, the Dodgers' Freddie Freeman hit the first walk-off grand slam in Series history to win the opening game. Announcer Joe Davis echoed the call of Vin Scully from 1988, saying "She is ... Gone!", comparing Freeman's walk-off to that of Kirk Gibson's in 1988 , saying "Gibby meet Freddie!" Both men were playing through injury when they hit their respective walk-off home runs.
2025	Game 3, October 27	Freddie Freeman, Los Angeles	Dodger Stadium	Brendon Little, Toronto	5–5, 18th 0 out 0 on	6–5	2–1 LAD	With the game tied 5–5 in the bottom of the 18th inning, Freddie Freeman hit a walk-off solo home run, becoming the only player in MLB history to record multiple walk-off home runs in the World Series. Freeman's second walk-off became the second time a Dodger has hit a walk-off home run in the bottom of the 18th inning at Dodger Stadium in game 3 of the World Series.

=== Playoff tiebreakers ===
Year	Game	Batter	Site	Pitcher	Situation	Final score	Series standing	Notes
1951 NL tiebreaker	Game 3, October 3	Bobby Thomson, N.Y. Giants	Polo Grounds	Ralph Branca, Brooklyn	2–4, 9th 1 out 2 on	**5–4**	**2–1 NYG**	The Giants trailed 4–1 entering the ninth. Alvin Dark and Don Mueller started the inning with singles. After an out, Whitey Lockman doubled to score Dark and send Mueller to third. Dodgers starting pitcher Don Newcombe was then replaced by Branca. With a count of no balls and one strike, Thomson homered down the left field line to send the Giants to the World Series. The home run came to be known as the "Shot Heard 'Round the World".

=== Other postseason series ===
==== Wild Card Game/Series ====
Year	Date	Batter	Site	Pitcher	Situation	Final score	Series standing	Notes
2016 ALWC	October 4	Edwin Encarnación, Toronto	Rogers Centre	Ubaldo Jiménez, Baltimore	2–2, 11th 1 out 2 on	5–2	**1–0 TOR**	With two runners on base, Edwin Encarnación drives the first pitch in his at-bat to left field to advance the Blue Jays to the ALDS.
2021 NLWC	October 7	Chris Taylor, Los Angeles Dodgers	Dodger Stadium	Alex Reyes, St. Louis	1–1, 9th 2 out 1 on	3–1	**1–0 LAD**	With a runner on base, Taylor hit a two-run home run to advance the Dodgers to the NLDS.
2022 ALWCS	October 8	Oscar González, Cleveland Guardians	Progressive Field	Corey Kluber, Tampa Bay Rays	0–0, 15th 0 out 0 on	1–0	**2–0 CLE**	González hit a 1–0 pitch into the left field bleachers to complete a 2–0 series sweep over the Rays.

==== Division Series ====
Year	Game	Batter	Site	Pitcher	Situation	Final score	Series Standing	Notes
1981 NLDS	Game 1, October 6	Alan Ashby, Houston	Astrodome	Dave Stewart, Los Angeles	1–1, 9th 2 out 1 on	3–1	1–0 HOU	With two out in the ninth, Ashby wins it with a two-run shot after Nolan Ryan pitches a two-hitter.
1981 NLDS	Game 4, October 10	George Vukovich, Philadelphia	Veterans Stadium	Jeff Reardon, Montreal	5–5, 10th 0 out 0 on	6–5	2–2	Vukovich pinch-hits a 2–0 pitch to right field leading off the tenth inning, tying the series.
1995 ALDS	Game 1, October 3	Tony Peña, Cleveland	Jacobs Field	Zane Smith, Boston	4–4, 13th 2 out 0 on	5–4	1–0 CLE	In a five-hour game delayed twice by rain, Peña hits a two-out shot in the 13th inning at 2:08 AM to win; it is Boston's 11th consecutive postseason loss, and Cleveland's first post-season win since the 1948 World Series. At the time the longest game in post-season history, it held the record for only one day.
1995 ALDS	Game 2, October 4	Jim Leyritz, N.Y. Yankees	Yankee Stadium	Tim Belcher, Seattle	5–5, 15th 1 out 1 on	7–5	2–0 NYY	With one out in the 15th inning, Leyritz hits a two-run homer to right. At five hours 13 minutes, it breaks the record set one day earlier for the longest post-season game.
1999 NLDS	Game 4, October 9	Todd Pratt, N.Y. Mets	Shea Stadium	Matt Mantei, Arizona	3–3, 10th 1 out 0 on	4–3	**3–1 NYM**	Pratt, substituting for an injured Mike Piazza, hits a home run to center field with one out in the tenth to win the series; Steve Finley nearly makes a leaping catch, but the ball just clears his glove and this became the first walk-off home run to decide the entire series in the divisional play since its inception in the post-strike 1995 season.
2000 NLDS	Game 3, October 7	Benny Agbayani, N.Y. Mets	Shea Stadium	Aaron Fultz, San Francisco	2–2, 13th 1 out 0 on	3–2	2–1 NYM	With one out in the 13th, Agbayani homers to left-center to end a five-hour 22 minute contest. Barry Bonds popped up with two men on in the top of the inning, ending a Giants threat.
2003 ALDS	Game 3, October 4	Trot Nixon, Boston	Fenway Park	Rich Harden, Oakland	1–1, 11th 1 out 1 on	3–1	2–1 OAK	With one out in the 11th, pinch-hitter Nixon slams a 1–1 pitch to center field for a game-winning two-run homer.
2004 NLDS	Game 2, October 7	Rafael Furcal, Atlanta	Turner Field	Dan Miceli, Houston	2–2, 11th 2 out 1 on	4–2	1–1	With two out in the 11th, Furcal hits a two-run home run to right field on a 1–2 pitch to even the series.
2004 ALDS	Game 3, October 8	David Ortiz, Boston	Fenway Park	Jarrod Washburn, Anaheim	6–6, 10th 2 out 1 on	8–6	**3–0 BOS**	Washburn enters the game with two out in the tenth and Ortiz smashes his first pitch to left field for a two-run homer to win the series for the Red Sox. Vladimir Guerrero had tied the game for the Angels with a grand slam in the seventh. This home run sent the Red Sox to the ALCS for the rematch with the New York Yankees.
2005 NLDS	Game 4, October 9	Chris Burke, Houston	Minute Maid Park	Joey Devine, Atlanta	6–6, 18th 1 out 0 on	7–6	**3–1 HOU**	Burke homers to left field on a 2–0 pitch with one out in the 18th inning, sending the Astros to the NLCS for the second year in a row. At five hours, 50 minutes long, it was the longest game by both innings and time in postseason history before Game 2 of the 2014 National League Division Series when the Nationals and Giants finished in 18 innings and 6 hours, 23 mins.
2007 ALDS	Game 2, October 5	Manny Ramírez, Boston	Fenway Park	Francisco Rodríguez, L.A. Angels	3–3, 9th 2 out 2 on	6–3	2–0 BOS	With two out in the bottom of the ninth inning and two men on base, Ramírez slams a 1–0 pitch over the Green Monster, over the seats behind it, and onto Lansdowne Street behind Fenway Park.
2009 ALDS	Game 2, October 9	Mark Teixeira, N.Y. Yankees	Yankee Stadium	José Mijares, Minnesota	3–3, 11th 0 out 0 on	4–3	2–0 NYY	With nobody out and nobody on in the bottom of the 11th, Teixeira lined a 2–1 pitch down the left field line that bounced off the top of the wall and landed in the first row of seats to give the Yankees a 4–3 win and a 2–0 series lead.
2012 ALDS	Game 3, October 10	Raúl Ibañez, N.Y. Yankees	Yankee Stadium	Brian Matusz, Baltimore	2–2, 12th 0 out 0 on	3–2	2–1 NYY	In the bottom of the ninth inning with one out and nobody on, Ibañez hit a solo home run to tie the game at 2–2. Then in the 12th, he hit another home run into the second deck to win the game and give the Yankees a 2–1 series lead.
2012 NLDS	Game 4, October 11	Jayson Werth, Washington	Nationals Park	Lance Lynn, St. Louis	1–1, 9th 0 out 0 on	2–1	2–2	Werth drilled the 13th pitch of the at-bat into the left field bullpen to win the game for the Nationals and force a Game 5.
2013 ALDS	Game 3, October 7	José Lobatón, Tampa Bay	Tropicana Field	Koji Uehara, Boston	4–4, 9th 2 out 0 on	5–4	2–1 BOS	With two outs and nobody on in the ninth inning, Lobatón hit a game-winning home run into the right-center field fish tank to keep the Rays' postseason hopes alive.
2021 ALDS	Game 3, October 10	Christian Vazquez, Boston	Fenway Park	Luis Patiño, Tampa Bay	4–4, 13th 1 out 1 on	6–4	2–1 BOS	Vazquez, who had not hit a home run since September 1, became the 8th catcher in postseason history to hit a walk-off home run when he hammered the first pitch into the left field Green Monster seats, handing Boston a dramatic 6–4 victory and a 2–1 series lead.
2022 ALDS	Game 1, October 11	Yordan Alvarez, Houston	Minute Maid Park	Robbie Ray, Seattle	5–7, 9th 2 out 2 on	**8–7**	1–0 HOU	Alvarez hit a 3-run home run with 2 outs to give the Astros a 1–0 lead in the series. This was the first postseason walk-off in MLB history in which the winning team was down by multiple runs prior to the walk-off.

==== League Championship Series ====
Year	Game	Batter	Site	Pitcher	Situation	Final score	Series standing	Notes
1973 NLCS	Game 1, October 6	Johnny Bench, Cincinnati	Riverfront Stadium	Tom Seaver, N.Y. Mets	1–1, 9th 1 out 0 on	2–1	1–0 CIN	Seaver set an NLCS record with 13 strikeouts and drove in the Mets' only run, but made two costly mistakes in Pete Rose's game-tying homer in the eighth and Bench's winning shot with one out in the ninth.
1973 ALCS	Game 3, October 9	Bert Campaneris, Oakland	Oakland–Alameda County Coliseum	Mike Cuellar, Baltimore	1–1, 11th 0 out 0 on	2–1	2–1 OAK	Campaneris hit the second pitch of the 11th inning over the left field wall; it was only the fourth hit allowed by Cuellar.
1976 ALCS	Game 5, October 14	Chris Chambliss, N.Y. Yankees	Yankee Stadium	Mark Littell, Kansas City	6–6, 9th 0 out 0 on	7–6	**3–2 NYY**	After George Brett tied the game with a three-run shot in the eighth, Chambliss brought the Yankees their first pennant in 12 years with a homer to right on the first pitch of the ninth inning. A flood of fans then stormed the field in a virtual riot; Chambliss was surrounded as he rounded first base, and had to reach out to touch second, which had been torn out by a fan. He never reached third, but teammates later had him return to step in the general area of home plate. Damages were estimated at US$100,000 and the disastrous walk-off dinger to decide the league pennant became the first in the LCS history.
1979 ALCS	Game 1, October 3	John Lowenstein, Baltimore	Memorial Stadium	John Montague, California	3–3, 10th 2 out 2 on	6–3	1–0 BAL	With two out in the tenth, Lowenstein pinch-hits a two-strike pitch to left for a three-run homer.
1984 NLCS	Game 4, October 6	Steve Garvey, San Diego	Jack Murphy Stadium	Lee Smith, Chi. Cubs	5–5, 9th 1 out 1 on	7–5	2–2	With one out in the ninth, Garvey hits a fastball to right-center for a two-run homer, his fourth hit of the day with five RBI; he has a record 20 career RBI in the league playoffs.
1985 NLCS	Game 5, October 14	Ozzie Smith, St. Louis	Busch Memorial Stadium	Tom Niedenfuer, Los Angeles	2–2, 9th 1 out 0 on	3–2	3–2 STL	Smith shocks the crowd with a one-out homer down the right field line on a 1–2 pitch. He has had 13 career homers in eight seasons, but this is his first ever when batting from the left side. The call, by KMOX and longtime Cardinals announcer Jack Buck, implores the fans to "Go crazy, folks! Go crazy!"
1986 NLCS	Game 3, October 11	Lenny Dykstra, N.Y. Mets	Shea Stadium	Dave Smith, Houston	4–5, 9th 1 out 1 on	**6–5**	2–1 NYM	With one out in the ninth, Dykstra hits an 0–1 pitch for a two-run homer to right field. It is the first time in post-season history that a game winning homer is hit by a team which is trailing.
1996 ALCS	Game 1, October 9	Bernie Williams, N.Y. Yankees	Yankee Stadium	Randy Myers, Baltimore	4–4, 9th 0 out 0 on	5–4	1–0 NYY	In one of the most controversial postseason games in history, Williams leads off the 11th with a game-winning homer. The Yankees had tied the game at 4–4 in the eighth inning when a 12-year-old fan reached over the right field wall and pulled a fly ball hit by Derek Jeter into the stands; umpire Rich Garcia ruled it a home run, but conceded his mistake after seeing a replay.
1999 ALCS	Game 1, October 13	Bernie Williams, N.Y. Yankees	Yankee Stadium	Rod Beck, Boston	3–3, 10th 0 out 0 on	4–3	1–0 NYY	After Beck enters the game to begin the tenth, Williams homers to center on his second pitch, becoming the first player to hit two game-winning home runs in postseason play.
1999 NLCS	Game 5, October 17	Robin Ventura, N.Y. Mets	Shea Stadium	Kevin McGlinchy, Atlanta	**3–3, 15th** **1 out** **3 on**	4–3	3–2 ATL	The Mets tie the score at 3–3 with a bases-loaded walk with one out in the 15th, bringing up Ventura, who with 13 career grand slams is tied for the lead among active players with Harold Baines and Mark McGwire. He comes through with the first game winning grand slam—and the first grand slam in extra innings—in post-season history, clearing the center-right field wall and forcing Game 6, but is officially credited with only a one-run single after being mobbed by teammates upon passing first base.
2001 ALCS	Game 4, October 21	Alfonso Soriano, N.Y. Yankees	Yankee Stadium	Kazuhiro Sasaki, Seattle	1–1, 9th 1 out 1 on	3–1	3–1 NYY	With one out in the ninth, Soriano hits a two-run shot to center field to bring the Yankees within a victory of their fourth straight pennant.
2003 ALCS	Game 7, October 16	Aaron Boone, N.Y. Yankees	Yankee Stadium	Tim Wakefield, Boston	5–5, 11th 0 out 0 on	6–5	**4–3 NYY**	After a managerial decision (subject to much second-guessing both immediately and later) to leave starter Pedro Martínez in the game allows the Yankees to tie it, Boone homers to left on the first pitch of the 11th inning to give the Yankees their sixth pennant in eight years and the second time in the Yankee franchise history since Chris Chambliss' series-ending walkoff dinger in the 1976 ALCS.
2004 ALCS	Game 4, October 17	David Ortiz, Boston	Fenway Park	Paul Quantrill, N.Y. Yankees	4–4, 12th 0 out 1 on	6–4	3–1 NYY	With none out in the 12th, Ortiz hits a two-run shot to right on a 2–1 pitch to keep Boston's hopes alive in the series; coming only ten days after his game winning shot against the Angels, he is the first player to hit two game winning homers in the same postseason. It is the Red Sox's first win in their historic ALCS comeback against the Yankees. Later that day (the game ended after midnight), Ortiz will hit a game-winning single in the 14th inning of Game 5, leading him to be named series MVP.
2004 NLCS	Game 5, October 18	Jeff Kent, Houston	Minute Maid Park	Jason Isringhausen, St. Louis	0–0, 9th 1 out 2 on	3–0	3–2 HOU	With one out in the ninth, Kent hits a three-run homer to left field on the first pitch for the game's only scoring, bringing the Astros within a victory of their first pennant.
2004 NLCS	Game 6, October 20	Jim Edmonds, St. Louis	Busch Memorial Stadium	Dan Miceli, Houston	4–4, 12th 1 out 1 on	6–4	3–3	In the very next game of the Astros-Cardinals series, Edmonds hits a two-run homer to right field on an 0–1 pitch with one out in the 12th, tying the series. Miceli becomes the first pitcher to surrender two game winning homers in the same post-season.
2006 ALCS	Game 4, October 14	Magglio Ordóñez, Detroit	Comerica Park	Huston Street, Oakland	3–3, 9th 2 out 2 on	6–3	**4–0 DET**	With two outs in the bottom of the ninth, after back-to-back two-out singles by Craig Monroe and Plácido Polanco, Ordóñez crushes a 1–0 fastball high over the left-field bullpen to complete a Tigers sweep, giving them their first pennant in 22 years since the Tigers won the World Series crown.
2011 ALCS	Game 2, October 10	Nelson Cruz, Texas	Globe Life Park in Arlington	Ryan Perry, Detroit	**3–3, 11th** **0 out** **3 on**	7–3	2–0 TEX	With no outs in the bottom of the 11th, after back-to-back-to-back singles by Michael Young, Adrián Beltré, and Mike Napoli, Cruz hit a slider over the left-field wall, putting the Rangers two wins away from back-to-back World Series appearances with MLB's first-ever official postseason walk-off grand slam.
2014 NLCS	Game 2, October 12	Kolten Wong, St. Louis	Busch Stadium	Sergio Romo, San Francisco	4–4, 9th 0 out 0 on	5–4	1–1	With no outs in the bottom of the ninth and a 1–0 count, Wong hit a lead-off home run over the right-field wall, clinching the Cardinals' NLCS-tying game against the San Francisco Giants.
2014 NLCS	Game 5, October 16	Travis Ishikawa, San Francisco	AT&T Park	Michael Wacha, St. Louis	3–3, 9th 1 out 2 on	6–3	**4–1 SF**	With one out in the bottom of the ninth, with runners on first and second due to a single by Pablo Sandoval (Joaquin Arias pinch running) and a walk by Brandon Belt, and a 2–0 count, Ishikawa hit a home run over the right-field wall, clinching the Giants' 4–1 NLCS victory over the St. Louis Cardinals. It is the first time in NLCS history that a walk-off home run ended the series and the first time for the Giants franchise since Bobby Thomson hit the series-ending walk-off dinger in 1951.
2017 NLCS	Game 2, October 15	Justin Turner, Los Angeles	Dodger Stadium	John Lackey, Chicago Cubs	1–1, 9th 2 out 2 on	4–1	2–0 LAD	With runners on first and second with two outs after walks by Yasiel Puig and Chris Taylor, Turner crushed a 1–0 fastball over the center-field fence to give the Dodgers a 2–0 series lead, exactly 29 years after Kirk Gibson's 1988 World Series home run.
2019 ALCS	Game 2, October 13	Carlos Correa, Houston	Minute Maid Park	J. A. Happ, New York Yankees	2–2, 11th 0 out 0 on	3–2	1–1	On the first pitch he saw in the inning, Correa crushed a fly ball to right field to even the series, which was the second time in three years that Correa delivered the game-winning hit to even a series at one a piece.
2019 ALCS	Game 6, October 19	Jose Altuve, Houston	Minute Maid Park	Aroldis Chapman, New York Yankees	4–4, 9th 2 out 1 on	6–4	**4–2 HOU**	With a runner on first with two outs after a walk by George Springer, Altuve crushed a 2–1 fastball over the left-field fence to give the Astros a 4–2 series victory. This was also the second time in New York Yankees franchise history which they lost a postseason series on a walk off home run, their first was the home run hit by Bill Mazeroski of the Pittsburgh Pirates in Game 7 of the 1960 World Series and it was the second time to hit the series-clinching dinger in the Houston Astro franchise history since Chris Burke's series-ending walk-off home run at the fourth game of the 2005 NLDS against Atlanta Braves after the 18-inning marathon before moving to the American League in 2013.
2020 ALCS	Game 5, October 15	Carlos Correa, Houston	Petco Park	Nick Anderson, Tampa Bay Rays	3–3, 9th 1 out 0 on	4–3	3–2 TB	On the third pitch he sees, Correa lined a deep shot to center field to force Game 6 for the Astros, who became the fourth team to force a Game 6 after trailing 3–0.
2024 ALCS	Game 3, October 17	David Fry, Cleveland	Progressive Field	Clay Holmes, New York Yankees	5–5, 10th 2 out 1 on	7–5	2–1 NYY	With a runner Bo Naylor on third with two outs down to the final strike, Fry hit a two-run home run to left center field to cut the Guardians' series deficit to 1–2.

=== All-Star Game ===
Year	Batter	Date and site	Pitcher	Final score	Notes
1941	Ted Williams, AL (Boston)	July 8, Briggs Stadium	Claude Passeau, NL (Chicago)	**7–5**	With two men on and the AL one out away from defeat, Williams hits a 1–1 pitch off the right field press box for the junior circuit's sixth win in nine contests. He later says, "I just shut my eyes and swung." It is the first All-Star game to be decided in the final inning.
1955	Stan Musial, NL (St. Louis)	July 12, Milwaukee County Stadium	Frank Sullivan, AL (Boston)	6–5	After being down 5–0 in the seventh inning, Musial's home run to right field on the first pitch of the 12th inning completes the NL's comeback; it is their fifth win in six years.
1964	Johnny Callison, NL (Philadelphia)	July 7, Shea Stadium	Dick Radatz, AL (Boston)	7–4	With two on and two out in the ninth, Callison wins the game with a homer to right field. Willie Mays had tied the score earlier in the inning with a walk, stolen base, and run on Orlando Cepeda's single. It is the NL's sixth win in the last seven decided games.

== Other notable walk-offs ==
=== Ultimate grand slams ===
This is a list of all 35 ultimate grand slams in MLB history.

Number	Date	Batter	Site	Pitcher	Final score
1	September 10, 1881	Roger Connor, Troy Trojans	Worcester Driving Park Grounds	Lee Richmond, Worcester Worcesters	7-8
2	September 24, 1925	Babe Ruth, New York Yankees	Yankee Stadium	Sarge Connally, Chicago White Sox	5-6
3	May 23, 1926	Sammy Byrd, Cincinnati Reds	Crosley Field	Cy Blanton, Pittsburgh Pirates	3-4
4	July 8, 1950	Jack Phillips, Pittsburgh Pirates	Forbes Field	Harry Brecheen, St. Louis Cardinals	6-7
5	June 16, 1952	Bobby Thomson, New York Giants	Polo Grounds	Willard Schmidt, St. Louis Cardinals	7-8
6	July 15, 1952	Eddie Joost, Philadelphia Athletics	Shibe Park	Satchel Paige, St. Louis Browns	6-7
7	September 11, 1955	Del Crandall, Milwaukee Braves	County Stadium	Herm Wehmeier, Philadelphia Phillies	4-5
8	May 11, 1956	Danny Kravitz, Pittsburgh Pirates	Forbes Field	Jack Meyer, Philadelphia Phillies	5-6
9	July 25, 1956	Roberto Clemente, Pittsburgh Pirates	Forbes Field	Jim Brosnan, Chicago Cubs	8-9
10	August 31, 1963	Ellis Burton, Chicago Cubs	Wrigley Field	Hal Woodeshick, Houston Colt .45s	5-6
11	August 2, 1970	Tony Taylor, Philadelphia Phillies	Connie Mack Stadium	Mike Davison, San Francisco Giants	6-7
12	August 11, 1970	Carl Taylor, St. Louis Cardinals	Busch Memorial Stadium	Ron Herbel, San Diego Padres	10-11
13	April 23, 1973	Ron Lolich, Cleveland Indians	Cleveland Stadium	Sonny Siebert, Boston Red Sox	7-8
14	May 1, 1979	Roger Freed, St. Louis Cardinals	Busch Memorial Stadium	Joe Sambito, Houston Astros	6-7
15	April 13, 1983	Bo Diaz, Philadelphia Phillies	Veterans Stadium	Neil Allen, New York Mets	9-10
16	August 31, 1984	Buddy Bell, Texas Rangers	Arlington Stadium	Pete Ladd, Milwaukee Brewers	6-7
17	April 13, 1985	Phil Bradley, Seattle Mariners	Kingdome	Ron Davis, Minnesota Twins	7-8
18	August 29, 1986	Dick Schofield, California Angels	Angel Stadium	Willie Hernandez, Detroit Tigers	12-13
19	June 21, 1988	Alan Trammell, Detroit Tigers	Tiger Stadium	Cecilio Guante, New York Yankees	6-7
20	May 17, 1996	Chris Hoiles, Baltimore Orioles	Oriole Park at Camden Yards	Norm Charlton, Seattle Mariners	13-14
21	July 28, 2001	Brian Giles, Pittsburgh Pirates	PNC Park	Billy Wagner, Houston Astros	8-9
22	May 17, 2002	Jason Giambi, New York Yankees	Yankee Stadium	Mike Trombley, Minnesota Twins	12-13
23	June 30, 2006	Adam Dunn, Cincinnati Reds	Great American Ball Park	Bob Wickman, Cleveland Indians	8-9
24	May 20, 2010	Brooks Conrad, Atlanta Braves	Turner Field	Francisco Cordero, Cincinnati Reds	9-10
25	July 7, 2011	Travis Hafner, Cleveland Indians	Progressive Field	Luis Pérez, Toronto Blue Jays	4-5
26	August 16, 2011	Brian Bogusevic, Houston Astros	Minute Maid Park	Carlos Marmol, Chicago Cubs	5-6
27	September 27, 2011	Ryan Roberts, Arizona Diamondbacks	Chase Stadium	Javy Guerra, Los Angeles Dodgers	6-7
28	June 30, 2014	Rajai Davis, Detroit Tigers	Comerica Park	Sean Doolittle, Oakland Athletics	4-5
29	July 30, 2017	Steve Pearce, Toronto Blue Jays	Rogers Centre	Bud Norris, Los Angeles Angels	10-11
30	August 12, 2018	David Bote, Chicago Cubs	Wrigley Field	Ryan Madson, Washington Nationals	3-4
31	September 5, 2021	Daniel Vogelbach, Milwaukee Brewers	American Family Field	Giovanny Gallegos, St. Louis Cardinals	5-6
32	August 17, 2022	Josh Donaldson, New York Yankees	Yankee Stadium	Jalen Beeks, Tampa Bay Rays	7-8
33	September 20, 2022	Giancarlo Stanton, New York Yankees	Yankee Stadium	Wil Crowe, Pittsburgh Pirates	8-9
34	June 10, 2026	Bryce Eldridge, San Francisco Giants	Oracle Park	Mitchell Parker, Washington Nationals	10-11
35	July 30, 2026	Kody Clemens, Minnesota Twins	Target Field	Matt Strahm, Kansas City Royals	3-4

=== Miscellaneous walk-offs ===
Year	Batter	Event	Date and Site	Pitcher	Situation	Final score	Notes
1955	Rich Cominski, Morrisville, Pennsylvania	Little League World Series	August 26, Williamsport, Pennsylvania	Tommy Trotman, Merchantville, New Jersey	3–3, 7th Leadoff	4–3	Cominski leads off the seventh inning of the title game with a home run after the teams are tied following six regulation innings. Both batter and pitcher are regular catchers playing out of position—Cominski in right field due to an injured thumb, and Trotman due to the starter reaching the series limit for pitchers' innings. Cy Young threw out the first pitch of the tournament, two months before his death at age 88.
1996	Warren Morris, LSU	College World Series	June 8, Rosenblatt Stadium	Robbie Morrison, Miami	7–8, 9th 1 on, 2 out	9–8	Morris hits a two-out, two-run game-winning home run on the last pitch in the championship game, giving the LSU Tigers their 3rd CWS title—it was also Morris' first and only home run of the season—and the only walk-off championship-winning home run in College World Series history. In addition, it is the only two-out, ninth inning, walk-off home run in a championship of any collegiate or professional level. The home run also won Morris the 1997 Showstopper of the Year ESPY Award.
2001	Hirotoshi Kitagawa, Osaka Kintetsu Buffaloes	NPB regular season	September 26, Osaka, Japan	Masanobu Okubo, Orix BlueWave	2–5, 9th 3 on, 0 out	6–5	Kitagawa hits a pinch-hit grand slam that erased a 3-run deficit and won the Pacific League pennant for the Osaka Kintetsu Buffaloes, their final pennant in franchise history before being merged into the Orix Blue Wave to form the Orix Buffaloes in the 2004-05 NPB off-season.
2002	Scott Hatteberg, Oakland Athletics	MLB regular season	September 4, Oakland Coliseum	Jason Grimsley, Kansas City Royals	11-11, 9th 0 on, 1 out	12-11	Hatteberg’s solo walk-off home run resulted in the Athletics setting the American League record for the longest winning streak by any team, at 20 consecutive games (later surpassed by the Indians in 2017). The home run was famously dramatized in the film Moneyball, in which Hatteberg was played by Chris Pratt.
2005	Michael Memea, Ewa Beach, Hawaii	Little League World Series	August 28, Lamade Stadium	Christopher Garia, Willemstad, Curaçao	6–6, 7th Leadoff	7–6	Memea hits a game winning solo home run in the bottom of the seventh inning of the championship game, giving Hawaii the title over the defending champions from Curaçao. Hawaii had only been put into position for the dramatic extra-inning win with a furious three-run rally in the bottom of the sixth.
2007	Deion Rosalia, Willemstad, Curaçao	Little League World Series	August 23, Volunteer Stadium	Reinaldo Amaro, Maracaibo, Venezuela	1–2, 7th 2 on, 2 out	4–2	In a semifinal of the International bracket, the Curaçao and Venezuela teams were tied 1–1 at the end of the regulation six innings. Venezuela's Bryan Charry led off the top of the seventh with a solo homer, staking them to a 2–1 lead. Curaçao had no one on with two out in their half of the seventh, but a single and walk set the table for Rosalia, who was down to his last strike before hitting his game-ending shot.
2007	Ryo Kanekubo, Tokyo, Japan	Little League World Series	August 25, Lamade Stadium	Rudson Pietersz, Willemstad, Curaçao	3–4, 6th 3 on, 1 out	7–4	Two days later, in the championship game of the international bracket, Curaçao becomes the victim of a game-winning shot. They take a 4–3 lead into the bottom of the sixth, but the Japan team responds by loading the bases for Kanekubo's shot, sending them to the title game the next day.
2007	Dalton Carriker, Warner Robins, Georgia	Little League World Series	August 26, Lamade Stadium	Junsho Kiuchi, Tokyo, Japan	2–2, 8th Leadoff	3–2	This time, the Japan team becomes a game-winning victim as Carriker hits a solo home run in the bottom of the eighth inning, giving the state of Georgia its second straight title and the U.S. a third straight title.
2016	Haruki Nishikawa, Hokkaido Nippon-Ham Fighters	Japan Series	October 27, Sapporo Dome	Shota Nakazaki, Hiroshima Toyo Carp	1–1, 9th 3 on, 1 out	5–1	In Game 5 of the 2016 Japan Series, Nishikawa hits the first walk-off grand slam since 1992 when, on a 1–0 count in the bottom of the ninth, he connects on a Nakazaki pitch to right field. The win was the third consecutive win by the Fighters, which would go on to win Game 6 and the series after losing the first two games.
2019	Bryce Blaum, Texas A&M Aggies	Morgantown Regional, NCAA Division I tournament	June 2, Monongalia County Ballpark	Sam Kessler, West Virginia Mountaineers	7–10, 9th 3 on, 2 out	11–10	In an elimination game, the top regional seed West Virginia (which was designated the away team for this game despite playing at home) took leads of 6–0 in the middle of the fifth inning and 9–1 in the middle of the seventh, only to see A&M put up 6 runs in the bottom of the seventh. West Virginia took a 3-run lead into the bottom of the ninth, but loaded the bases for Blaum, who eliminated the Mountaineers with a grand slam on a 3–2 count with two outs.
2022	Cal Raleigh, Seattle Mariners	2022 MLB Regular season	September 30, T-Mobile Park	Domingo Acevedo, Oakland Athletics	1–1, 9th 0 on, 2 out	2–1	Cal Raleigh hits a pinch hit, solo walk-off home run to help the Mariners clinch their first postseason berth since 2001, ending their 21 year drought.
2023	Louis Lappe, El Segundo, California	Little League World Series	August 27, Lamade Stadium	Jay-Dlynn Wiel, Willemstad, Curaçao	5–5, 6th Leadoff	6–5	After Nasir El-Ossais of Curaçao tied the game 5-5 in the top of the 5th inning with a grand slam, Louis Lappe of El Segundo California sent a 1-0 pitch over the left field wall to clinch the Little League World Series title for the team from California.
2024	Shohei Ohtani, Los Angeles Dodgers	2024 MLB Regular season	August 23, Dodger Stadium	Colin Poche, Tampa Bay Rays	3–3, 9th 3 on, 2 out	7–3	Ohtani stole his 40th base of the season in the 4th inning of the game, then proceeded to hit a walk-off grand slam to become the fastest player in MLB history to reach 40 home runs and 40 stolen bases in a single season.

== In fiction ==
Although the term itself would not be used until over 100 years later, "Casey at the Bat", an 1888 poem by Ernest Thayer, features a potential walk-off home run. Although pessimistic at first, the home team's fans become more optimistic when their star, Casey, unexpectedly gets a chance to hit a walk-off three run home run. In the end they go home disappointed, however, when Casey strikes out rather than hitting the home run the fans expect.

== See also ==
- Walk-off touchdown
- Game-winning RBI
- Homer in the Gloamin'
- Career record for walk-off home runs
- Chasing a target, the cricket equivalent
- Sudden death (sports)
