= Big Three (Atlanta Braves) =

Trio of baseball pitchers

"The Big Three"

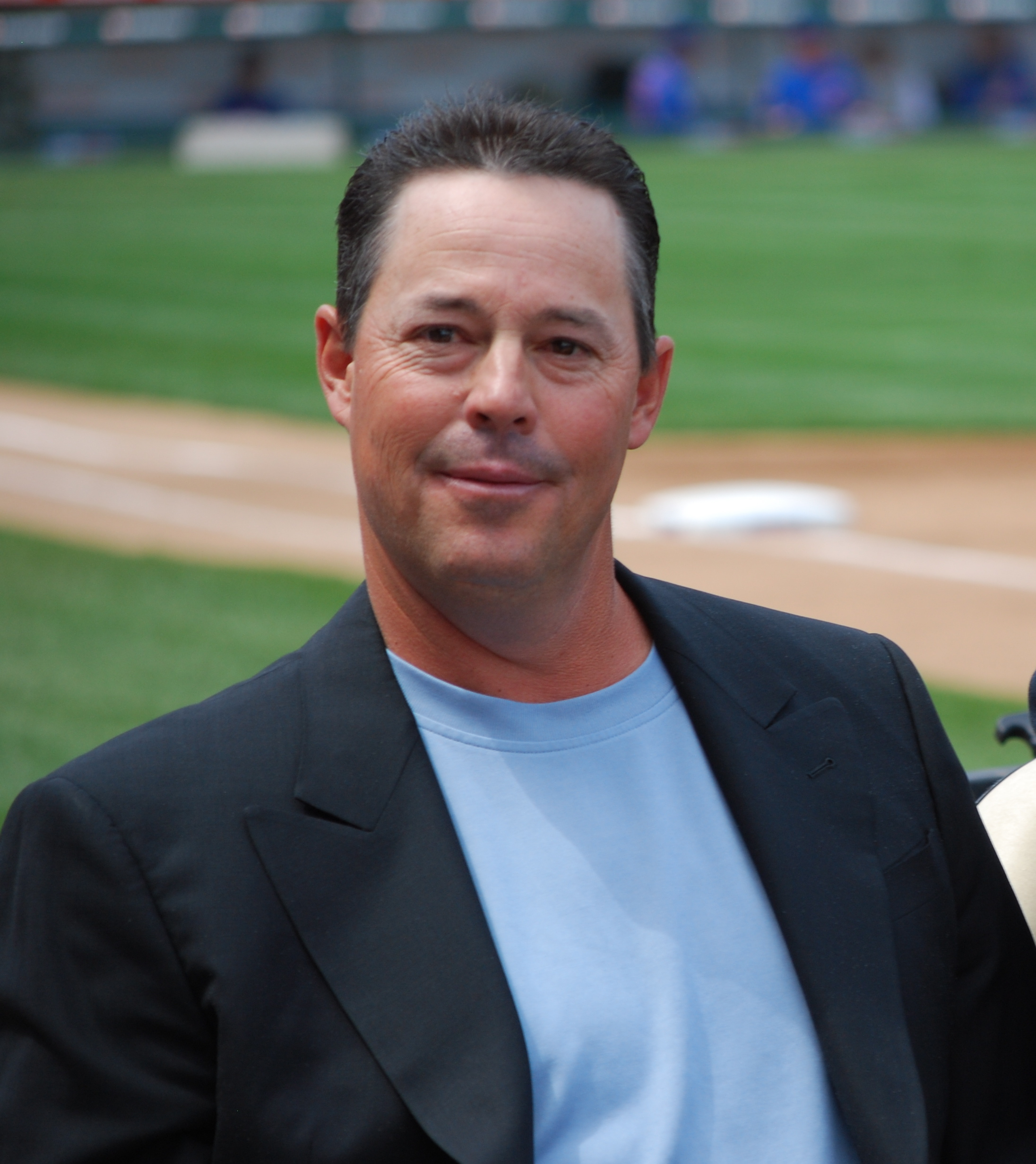
Greg Maddux

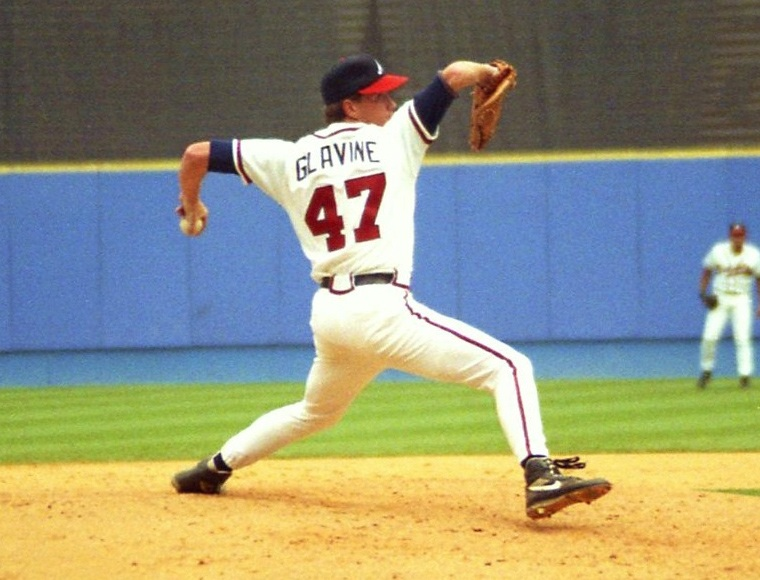
Tom Glavine

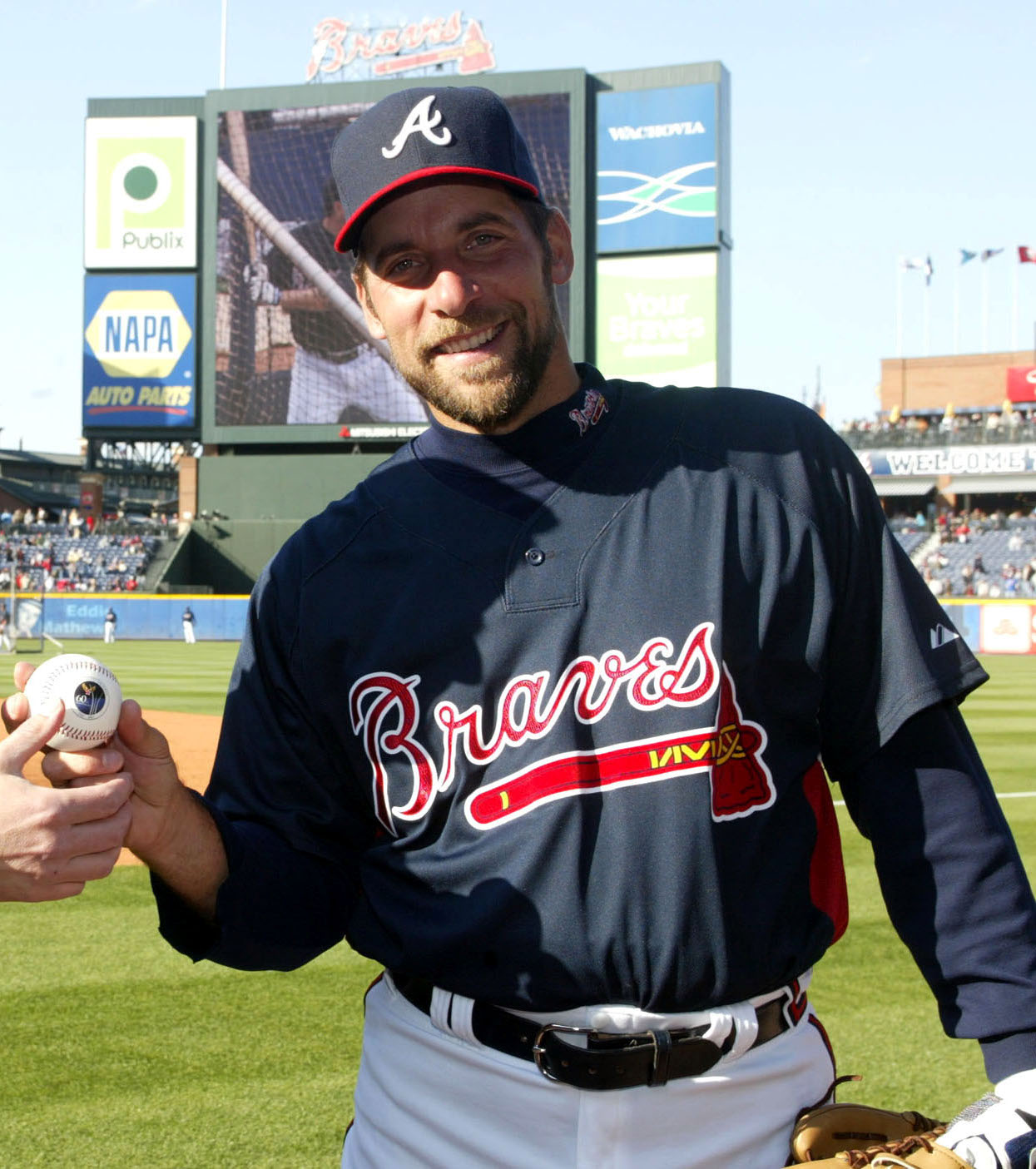
John Smoltz

The Big Three was a trio of Major League Baseball starting pitchers for the Atlanta Braves from 1993 to 2002 which consisted of Greg Maddux, Tom Glavine, and John Smoltz. The Big Three combined to win seven National League Cy Young Awards in the 1990s and helped lead the Atlanta Braves to a 1995 World Series win. Each member of the Big Three has had their jersey number retired by the Atlanta Braves and were inducted into the Baseball Hall of Fame in their first year of eligibility.

== Pre-Big 3 ==
Tom Glavine made his Major League debut on August 17, 1987, while John Smoltz made his Major League debut on July 23, 1988. At that time, Greg Maddux was playing with the Chicago Cubs. Both Smoltz and Glavine quickly established themselves as viable starting pitchers for the Braves by 1990 (although Glavine was just 33–43 from 1987 to 1990). Smoltz went to his first All-Star Game in 1989 with a 12–11 record and a 2.94 ERA in 208 innings. For a team that won just 65 games in 1990, Smoltz and Glavine combined for 24 wins to 23 losses.

Their dominance begun in 1991 as Tom Glavine had a NL-leading 20 wins, winning his first Cy Young Award. They helped lead the Atlanta Braves to a National League West Division title for the first time in nine years. While Glavine lost his two starts, Smoltz won both of his starts (including Game 7) to help the Braves prevail over the Pittsburgh Pirates to win the National League pennant, their first since 1958. In the World Series, Glavine started Game 2 and 5 while Smoltz started Game 4 and 7 in a classic series that matched them against the Minnesota Twins; Glavine split his starts while Smoltz received two no-decisions, which included the Twins rallying to notch the series-winning run in the tenth inning of the deciding game.

Smoltz and Glavine's success continued into 1992, with Glavine finishing second in the Cy Young voting, and Smoltz being named to the National League All-Star team. In the National League Championship Series, Smoltz started Game 1 and 4 while Glavine started Games 3 and 6 (which resulted in two wins for the former and losses for the latter) to set up a pivotal Game 7, which had Smoltz as starter in what would later be considered one of the best postseason games ever played, as the Braves scored three runs in the bottom of the ninth inning (including two on their final out) to prevail over Pittsburgh and win their second straight league pennant. Smoltz pitched the most innings of any pitcher in the series with 20.1 innings while going 2–0 on his way to being named NLCS MVP. Glavine started Game 1 and Game 4, while Smoltz started Games 2 and 5 as the Braves lost the series to the Toronto Blue Jays in six games.

== Big Three era (The peak 1991-1999) ==
=== 1993 and 1994 ===
Prior to the 1993 MLB season, the Atlanta Braves signed Greg Maddux (who had won the National League Cy Young Award the previous year) from the Chicago Cubs, marking the beginning of the Big Three era. The Big Three had a strong 1993 season as Maddux posted a 20–10 record, winning his second straight NL Cy Young Award, Glavine led the National League in wins for the third consecutive season as he posted a 22–6 record, and Smoltz once again made the All Star team. The "Big Three" helped the Braves win the National League West for the third consecutive season, despite trailing the San Francisco Giants for most of the season. The Braves eventually fell to the Philadelphia Phillies in the National League Championship Series. Maddux won his third consecutive Cy Young Award in the strike-shortened 1994 season as he posted a 16–6 record, had a National League leading ERA of 1.56, and struck out 156 batters.

=== 1995: Champions ===
The 1995 season started late, starting on April 26 that would see 144 games played rather than 162. The Braves began with a 20–17 start by June 4, with a 24–12 run leading up to the 1995 Major League Baseball All-Star Game, which saw only pitcher Greg Maddux selected among the three. Maddux would go on to win his fourth consecutive NL Cy Young Award with a league-leading 19–2 win-loss record and a 1.63 ERA, while leading the Braves in complete games (ten) and shutouts (three). Glavine would win sixteen games with a 3.08 ERA while Smoltz won twelve; the two and Steve Avery led the Braves in games started with 29. The Braves cruised to the National League East title with 90 wins, beating the New York Mets by 21 games. They faced the Colorado Rockies in the 1995 National League Division Series and beat them in four games to reach the National League Championship Series against the Cincinnati Reds. Maddux started Game 1, Glavine got Game 2, and Smoltz got Game 3, which all resulted in wins (only Maddux pitched well enough to receive the win), and Steve Avery closed the series out with a 6–0 victory in Game 4 to send Atlanta back to the World Series. In the 1995 World Series, the Braves were matched against the American League champion Cleveland Indians, who were making their first World Series appearance in 41 years after winning 100 games in the regular season. Maddux was paired against Orel Hershiser in Game 1. While Cleveland scored the first run of the game through the efforts of Kenny Lofton and Carlos Baerga without getting a hit, Maddux shut the team down the rest of the way with a complete game two-hitter while Fred McGriff and Luis Polonia contributed runs to deliver a 3–2 victory. Glavine was matched against Dennis Martínez in Game 2 and went six innings while allowing just two runs as the Braves won 4–3. Smoltz started Game 3 against Charles Nagy, but the game was a disaster that saw him leave the game in the third inning as Cleveland won 7–6 in eleven innings. After the Braves won Game 4 with the efforts of Steve Avery, Maddux was sent to the mound on Game 5 for a potential clincher. It turned into a disappointment, as Albert Belle and Jim Thome hit home runs to carry Hershiser as Cleveland won 5–4. Glavine returned to start Game 6, which saw him and David Justice as stars of the show, with the former having eight innings of one-hit ball while the latter scored the only run of the game. Mark Wohlers collected the save that saw Marquis Grissom catch a fly ball in center field to win the championship. Cleveland went from batting .291 in the regular season to hitting .179 in the World Series. Glavine received the World Series MVP for his efforts. Glavine won both of his starts (Game 2 and 6), and he allowed just four hits and two runs in fourteen innings pitched with eleven strikeouts to six walks.

=== 1996–1998 ===
The trio had another strong season in 1996, with Smoltz leading the league in wins and strikeouts on his way to winning the National League Cy Young Award. In the National League Championship Series, they faced the underdog St. Louis Cardinals; Smoltz won the opening game, but the Braves soon fell behind under surprise losses by Maddux and Glavine. Down 3–1 in the series, the Braves proceeded to rally with wins from all three members of the trio while allowing just one run combined to win three straight games and complete the comeback to become the eighth team in MLB history to overcome a 3–1 deficit and the first to do so in an NLCS. In the World Series, they were matched against the New York Yankees, who were making their first World Series appearance in fifteen years. Smoltz and Maddux easily dispatched the Yankees to give the Braves a 2–0 lead as the series shifted from New York to Atlanta. In Game 3, Glavine was matched against David Cone (who had started against the Braves for the Toronto Blue Jays in the 1992 World Series). Glavine was outmatched by the resurgent Yankee lineup (which had scored once in the two previous games), as they scored two runs on Glavine by the time he left in the seven and added three more in the eighth to win 5–2; the ensuing Game 4 proved horrific, as Atlanta blew a six run lead and lost 8–6 in ten innings. Smoltz, now in a tied series as the starter for Game 5, could not slow the bleeding. This was his seventh career start in a World Series (two wins, four no-decisions). Unfortunately, this would be his first loss, which came at the hands of a fourth inning flyball that went past the fielders for a two-base error that was followed by a double to score the only run of the game. Maddux was tasked to save the Braves in Game 6 in New York. However, the Yankees scored all the runs they needed in third innings on four hits to prevail 3–2 and win the Series. Over the next two years, the Big Three continued to perform well, with Maddux finishing second in Cy Young voting in 1997 and Glavine capturing his second Cy Young Award in 1998. Unfortunately, the Braves failed to reach the World Series in both years (with the trio combining for one win and save in the League Championship Series for 1997 and 1998)

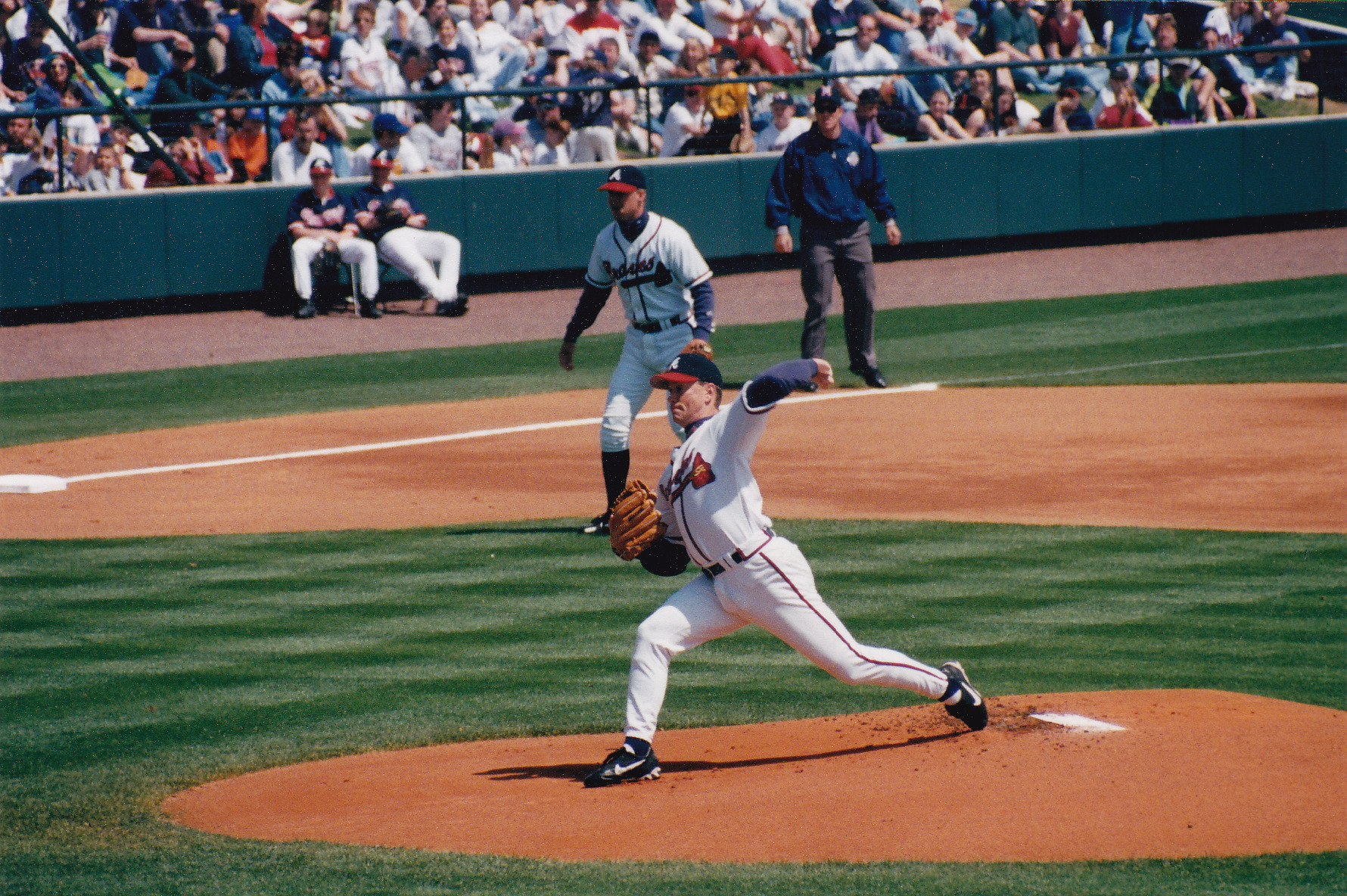
Tom Glavine would win his second NL Cy Young Award in 1998

=== 1999: Their last NL pennant and the official end of the Big Three together ===
Although their stats didn't look so bright the following year, the group still led the Braves to a league-best 103–59 record. Maddux pitched seven strong innings in Game 1, only surrendering two runs, but reliever Mike Remlinger surrendered four runs in the ninth inning and the Braves lost to the Astros 6–1. The Braves won Game 2 5–1 to even the series at one apiece heading to Houston for Games 3 and 4. In Game 3, after giving up two runs in the first inning, Glavine went five innings without surrendering another run as the Braves went on to beat the Astros 5–3 in twelve innings. In Game 4, Smoltz went the first seven innings only giving up one run and the Braves held a 7–0 lead. Then in the 8th inning, he gave up a three-run homer to Ken Caminiti, which resulted in Smoltz being pulled out of the Game as John Rocker halted the Astros rally with three outs. The Braves won the game 7–5 and advanced to the NLCS for the eighth consecutive season. Maddux got off to a solid start in the NLCS against the New York Mets as he gave up only one run in seven innings to lead the Braves to a 4–2 win in Game 1. Smoltz pitched a 1–2–3 inning in the 9th to seal a 4–3 win for the Braves in Game 2 and take a 2–0 series lead heading to New York. Glavine pitched seven scoreless innings n Game 3 to lead the Braves to a 1–0 win over the Mets and put them one game away from advancing to the World Series. Smoltz did his part on Game 4 as he only allowed two runs in 7 1/3 innings, but Mike Remlinger could not seal it for the Braves as he gave up another run which ultimately cost them the game, as they lost 3–2. After allowing two runs in the first inning of Game 5, Maddux pitched six scoreless innings, but the game was tied 2–2 at that point and the Braves ultimately lost 4–3 in 15 innings. The Braves won Game 6 10–9 in eleven innings to capture the NL Pennant and advance to the 1999 World Series. Maddux started the World Series strong as he pitched seven scoreless innings; however, he put four consecutive hitters on base to start the 8th inning and all four of them scored, which gave the Yankees a 4–1 lead and the Yankees ended up winning 4–1. After the Braves lost Game 2 7–2, Glavine gave up five runs in seven innings as the Braves lost 6–5 in ten innings and faced a 3–0 hole. Smoltz gave up three runs in seven innings in Game 4 and the Braves were swept in the World Series, losing Game 4 4–1.

=== 2000–2002: Transition ===
The 2000 season was a rough one for the Braves, as Smoltz missed the entire season due to undergoing Tommy John surgery. However, Maddux and Glavine still did what they had to do to lead the Braves to their ninth consecutive division title, and sixth consecutive NL East title as Maddux had a 19–9 record, a 3.00 ERA, and 190 strikeouts and Glavine had a NL-leading 21 wins, a 3.40 ERA, and 152 strikeouts. The postseason did not go well for them as Maddux gave up seven runs in just four innings in Game 1 and Glavine gave up seven runs in just 2 1/3 innings in Game 2 and the Braves were swept by the Cardinals in the 2000 NLDS and missed the NLCS for the first time since 1990.

The 2001 season saw some changes for the Braves as John Smoltz became the Braves closer after recovering from Tommy John surgery and being unable to perform as a starter, filling in for the void left by John Rocker, who was traded to the Indians. This left Maddux and Glavine as the two left in the starting rotation. As such, they were able to adapt well enough to these changes to lead them to their 10th consecutive division title, and seventh consecutive NL East title. After Maddux gave up three runs in six innings in Game 1 of the NLDS against the Astros, Smoltz pitched two strong innings of relief pitching as the Braves started off the NLDS with a 7–4 win over the Astros in Game 1. Glavine pitched eight scoreless innings in Game 2 and Smoltz capped it off with a scoreless 9th inning to lead the Braves to a 1–0 win over the Astros in Game 2 to take a 2–0 series lead heading home. The Braves went on to win Game 3 6–2 to advance to the NLCS. Maddux pitched seven strong innings in Game 1 of the NLCS against the Arizona Diamondbacks, only surrendering two runs, but the Braves lost the game 2–0. Glavine went seven innings in Game 2 and only give up one run while John Smoltz pitched a 1–2–3 9th inning to lead the Braves to an 8–1 win in Game 2 to even the series heading home. After the Braves lost Game 3 5–1, Maddux surrendered six runs in just three innings as the Braves lost 11–4 and fell one win away from elimination. Glavine did not have a strong Game 5 either, as he allowed three runs in five innings as the Braves lost Game 5 3–2 and were eliminated from the postseason. As it would turn out, this began a nineteen-year drought of postseason series victories, as the Braves lost eight postseason series in a row before the drought ended in 2020.

In what would be their final season together, the trio led the Braves to a 101–59 record and their eleventh consecutive division title, and their eighth consecutive NL East title. Glavine did not pitch well in Game 1 of the NLDS against the Giants as he gave up eight runs in five innings as the Braves lost 8–5. After the Braves won Game 2 7–3, Maddux went six innings while allowing two runs to lead the Braves to a 10–2 win over the Giants in Game 3 and put them one win away from a trip to the NLCS. However, Glavine pitched poorly in Game 4 as he allowed seven runs in just 2 2/3 innings as the Braves lost 8–3. The Braves ended up losing Game 5 3–1 and were eliminated from the postseason in the NLDS.

== Post-"Big 3" ==
After the 2002 season, Tom Glavine signed with the New York Mets, ending the Big Three's time together in Atlanta. The duo of Greg Maddux and John Smoltz was still good enough to lead the Braves to a 101–61 record and their 12th straight division title, also their 9th consecutive NL East title. After the Braves lost Game 1 of the NLDS 4–2 to the Chicago Cubs and with the Braves leading 3-2 after the 7th inning of Game 2, Smoltz came into Game 2 and pitched two innings of one run baseball (with a perfect 9th inning) to lead the Braves to a 5–3 win in Game 2. After allowing two runs in the first inning of Game 3, Maddux pitched five scoreless innings, but that was not enough for the Braves as they fell to the Cubs 3–1 in Game 3. Smoltz took relief duties in Game 4 and after allowing two doubles to begin the bottom of the 9th inning, he got the next three batters out to seal a 6–4 win for the Braves in Game 4 and force a Game 5 back in Atlanta. The Braves lost Game 5 5-1 and were eliminated from the postseason.

Following the 2003 season, Maddux returned to the Chicago Cubs, leaving Smoltz as the only player of the "Big Three" left with the Braves for the 2004 season. Smoltz recorded 44 saves in the 2004 season to lead the Braves to their 13th consecutive division title, also their 10th consecutive NL East title. After the Braves lost Game 1 of the NLDS to the Astros 9–3, Smoltz pitched three scoreless innings in relief in Game 2 to help the Braves beat the Astros 4–2. After the Braves lost Game 3 8–5, Smoltz pitched two scoreless innings in relief to lead the Braves to a 6–5 win over the Astros and force a Game 5 in Atlanta. The Braves lost Game 5 12-3 and were then eliminated in the NLDS for the third consecutive year.

Smoltz returned to the starting rotation for the 2005 season and ended up with a 14–7 record, a 3.06 ERA and 169 strikeouts to help the Braves win their 14th consecutive Division Title and 11th consecutive NL East title. Smoltz's start in the NLDS went well as he lasted seven innings and only gave up one run to lead the Braves to a 7–1 win in Game 2. The other games did not go well for the Braves as they lost the NLDS to the Astros in four games.

Smoltz had another successful season the following year with a NL-leading 16 wins, a 3.49 ERA, and 211 strikeouts, but that was not enough for the Braves as they finished 3rd in the NL East; they ended up missing the playoffs and not winning their division for the first time since 1990. He had another successful year in 2007 with a 14–8 record, a 3.11 ERA, and 197 strikeouts, but again that wasn't enough for the Braves as they finished 3rd in their division yet again and missed the playoffs for the second consecutive season.

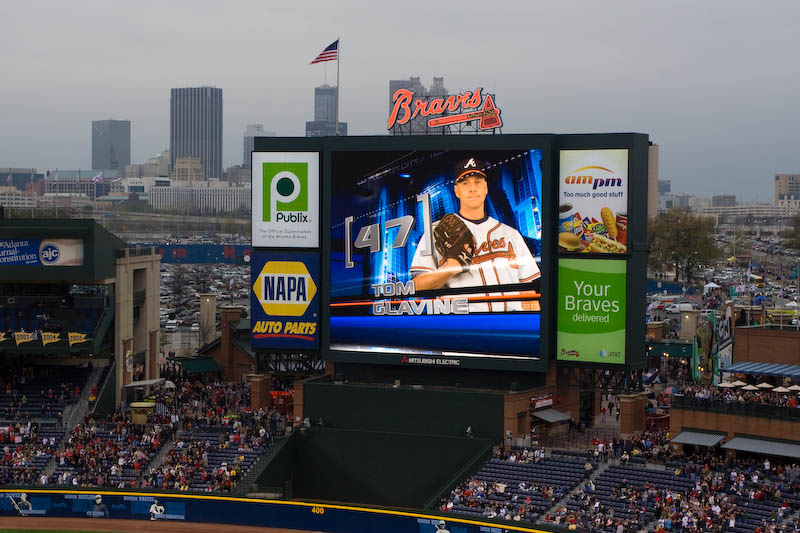
Glavine being introduced at Turner Field in his first game back with the Braves in 2008

Tom Glavine returned to the Braves for the 2008 season, but the two of them could not get the Braves back into the playoffs as they finished fourth in their division that season. That season was the last for Glavine as he underwent rehab the following season, and was released from the Braves on June 3, 2009, and he officially retired from baseball on February 11, 2010.

The 2008 season was also John Smoltz's last season with the Braves as he signed with the Boston Red Sox for the 2009 season. He spent half of that season with the Red Sox, and the other half of that season with the Cardinals, after which he retired from baseball. Greg Maddux spent three more seasons with the Chicago Cubs and then he was traded to the Los Angeles Dodgers in the middle of the 2006 season. Maddux then spent his final two seasons with the San Diego Padres and was traded again to the Dodgers in the middle of the 2008 season, after which he retired from baseball.

== Statistics ==
Atlanta Braves season results, 1991–2005
Season	Record	Divisional finish	Playoffs
1991	94–68	1st (West)	Won NLCS vs. Pittsburgh Pirates, 4–3; Lost World Series vs. Minnesota Twins, 3–4
1992	98–64	1st (West)	Won NLCS vs. Pittsburgh Pirates, 4–3; Lost World Series vs. Toronto Blue Jays, 2–4
1993	104–58	1st (West)	Lost NLCS vs. Philadelphia Phillies, 2–4
1995	90–54	1st (East)	Won NLDS vs. Colorado Rockies, 3-1; Won NLCS vs. Cincinnati Reds, 4–0; Won World Series vs. Cleveland Indians, 4–2
1996	96–66	1st (East)	Won NLDS vs. Los Angeles Dodgers, 3–0; Won NLCS vs. St. Louis Cardinals, 4–3; Lost World Series vs. New York Yankees, 2–4
1997	101–61	1st (East)	Won NLDS vs. Houston Astros, 3–0; Lost NLCS vs. Florida Marlins, 2–4
1998	106–56	1st (East)	Won NLDS vs. Chicago Cubs, 3–0; Lost NLCS vs. San Diego Padres, 2–4
1999	103–59	1st (East)	Won NLDS vs. Houston Astros, 3–1; Won NLCS vs. New York Mets, 4–2; Lost World Series vs. New York Yankees, 0–4
2000	95–67	1st (East)	Lost NLDS vs. St. Louis Cardinals, 0–4
2001	88–74	1st (East)	Won NLDS vs. Houston Astros, 3–0; Lost NLCS vs. Arizona Diamondbacks, 1–4
2002	101–61	1st (East)	Lost NLDS vs. San Francisco Giants, 3–2
2003	101–61	1st (East)	Lost NLDS vs. Chicago Cubs, 3–2
2004	96–66	1st (East)	Lost NLDS vs. Houston Astros, 3–2
2005	90–72	1st (East)	Lost NLDS vs. Houston Astros, 3–1

== Legacy ==
The "Big Three" is considered by many to be the greatest pitching trio of all time. From 1993 to 2002, they combined for 453 wins to 224 losses with 4,616 strikeouts. They contributed greatly in the dominance of the Atlanta Braves in the era they played in, which saw them reach the postseason from 1991 to 2005 (minus the strike-shortened season of 1994) that saw them go 63–62 in the postseason while winning fourteen NL East titles, five National League pennants, and one world championship.

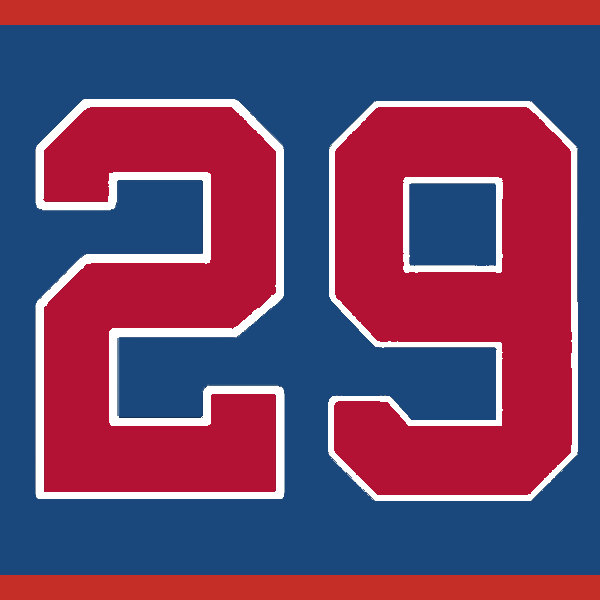
John Smoltz's number 29 was retired by the Atlanta Braves in 2012.

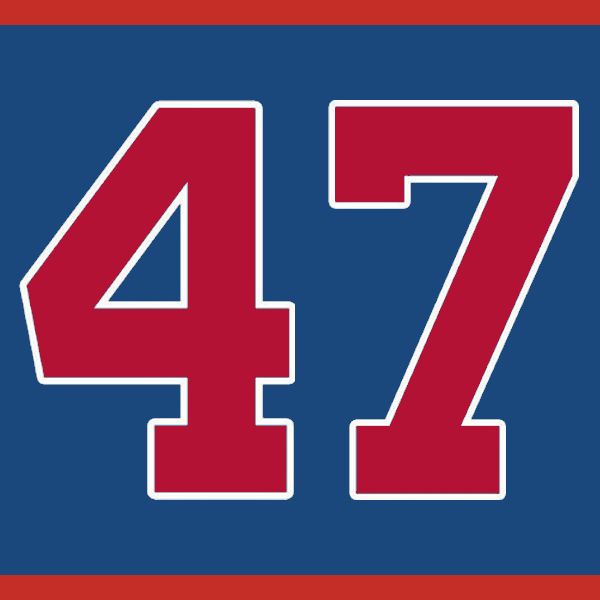
Tom Glavine's number 47 was retired by the Atlanta Braves in 2010.

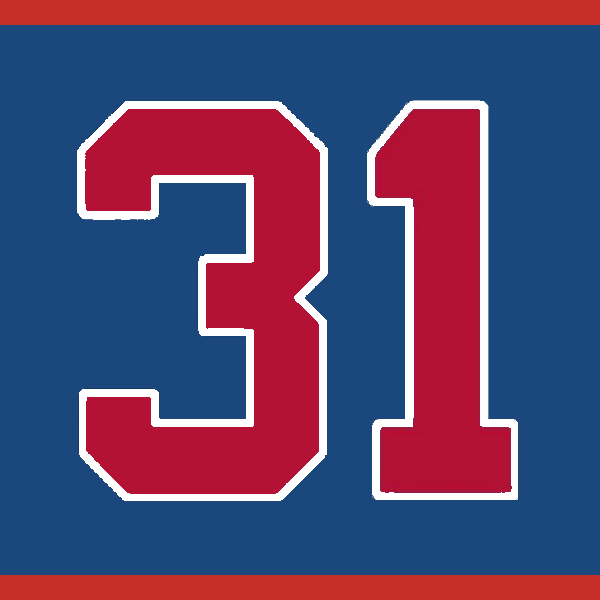
Greg Maddux's number 31 was retired by the Atlanta Braves in 2009.

All three pitchers would have their numbers retired by the Braves as Greg Maddux would have his number retired on July 31, 2009, Tom Glavine would see his number retired on August 6, 2010, and John Smoltz would have his number retired on July 8, 2012.

All three pitchers would be inducted into the National Baseball Hall of Fame in their first year of eligibility. Greg Maddux and Tom Glavine would both be inducted in 2014 receiving 97.2% and 91.9% of the possible votes respectively, and John Smoltz would be inducted the following year, receiving 82.9% of the possible votes.
