= Brian Hunter (first baseman) =

American baseball player (born 1968)

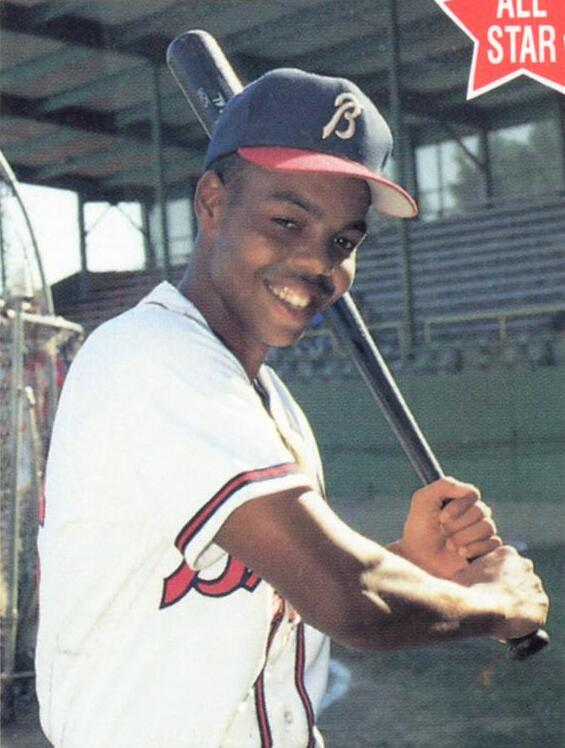
- Hunter with the Burlington Braves c. 1988
- First baseman
- Born: March 4, 1968 (age 58); Torrance, California, U.S.
- Batted: Right Threw: Left

MLB debut
- May 31, 1991, for the Atlanta Braves

Last MLB appearance
- October 1, 2000, for the Philadelphia Phillies

MLB statistics
- Batting average: .234
- Home runs: 67
- Runs batted in: 259
- Stats at Baseball Reference

Teams
- Atlanta Braves (1991–1993); Pittsburgh Pirates (1994); Cincinnati Reds (1994–1995); Seattle Mariners (1996); St. Louis Cardinals (1998); Atlanta Braves (1999–2000); Philadelphia Phillies (2000)

Brian Raynold Hunter (born March 4, 1968) is an American former professional baseball player. He played all or parts of nine seasons in Major League Baseball between 1991 and 2000 for the Atlanta Braves, Pittsburgh Pirates, Cincinnati Reds, Seattle Mariners, St. Louis Cardinals and Philadelphia Phillies. While he was primarily a first baseman, he also appeared in nearly 100 games as an outfielder. After retiring, he has worked as a scout and coach.

== Career ==
Drafted by the Atlanta Braves in the 8th round of the 1987 amateur draft, Hunter appeared in three World Series in 1991, 1992 and 1999 as a member of the Braves.

As a rookie, Hunter hit two home runs in the 1991 postseason. He hit a two-run home run in the first inning of the deciding Game 7 of the National League Championship Series at Three Rivers Stadium against the Pittsburgh Pirates; the Braves won the game 4–0, advancing to the World Series to face the Minnesota Twins. In Game 5 against the Twins, he homered in a 14–5 Atlanta victory.

Hunter his 26 home runs over his first two major league seasons, but lost his role after Atlanta traded for Fred McGriff. Atlanta traded Hunter to Pittsburgh on November 17, 1993, for a player to be named later (PTBNL). (Minor leaguer Jose Delgado was sent to Atlanta to complete the trade.)

On July 27, 1994, Pittsburgh traded Hunter to the Cincinnati Reds for a PTBNL. After the strike-shortened season, the Reds sent Micah Franklin to complete the trade.

Hunter signed with the Seattle Mariners in 1996, and he elected free agency after the season after refusing a minor league assignment.

Hunter returned to Atlanta in 1999. He appeared in his third World Series, coming off the bench and making two errors in Game 1 of the series, a loss to the New York Yankees. No first baseman had made two errors in one inning of a World Series game since Frank Torre in 1958.

== Post-playing career ==
Hunter worked as a scout for the Washington Nationals and New York Mets before the Atlanta Braves hired him in 2006. He worked for Atlanta through 2012.

Hunter has coached youth baseball teams, including "The Program" team and MLB's Breakthrough Series. He coached the American League team in the 2025 All-Star Futures Game.

== Personal life ==
Hunter is the brother of basketball player and coach Loree Moore.
