= Howard Battle =

American baseball player (born 1972)

- Third baseman
- Born: March 25, 1972 (age 54); Biloxi, Mississippi, U.S.
- Batted: Right Threw: Right

Professional debut
- MLB: September 5, 1995, for the Toronto Blue Jays
- NPB: 2000, for the Hanshin Tigers

Last appearance
- MLB: October 3, 1999, for the Atlanta Braves
- NPB: 2000, for the Hanshin Tigers

MLB statistics
- Batting average: .243
- Home runs: 1
- Runs batted in: 5

NPB statistics
- Batting average: .227
- Home runs: 1
- Runs batted in: 1
- Stats at Baseball Reference

Teams
- Toronto Blue Jays (1995); Philadelphia Phillies (1996); Atlanta Braves (1999); Hanshin Tigers (2000)

Howard Dion Battle (born March 25, 1972) is a former third baseman in Major League Baseball. Battle spent parts of three seasons in the majors with the Toronto Blue Jays, Philadelphia Phillies and Atlanta Braves. Battle attended Mercy Cross High School in Biloxi, MS.
