= Derrin Ebert =

American baseball pitcher (born 1976)

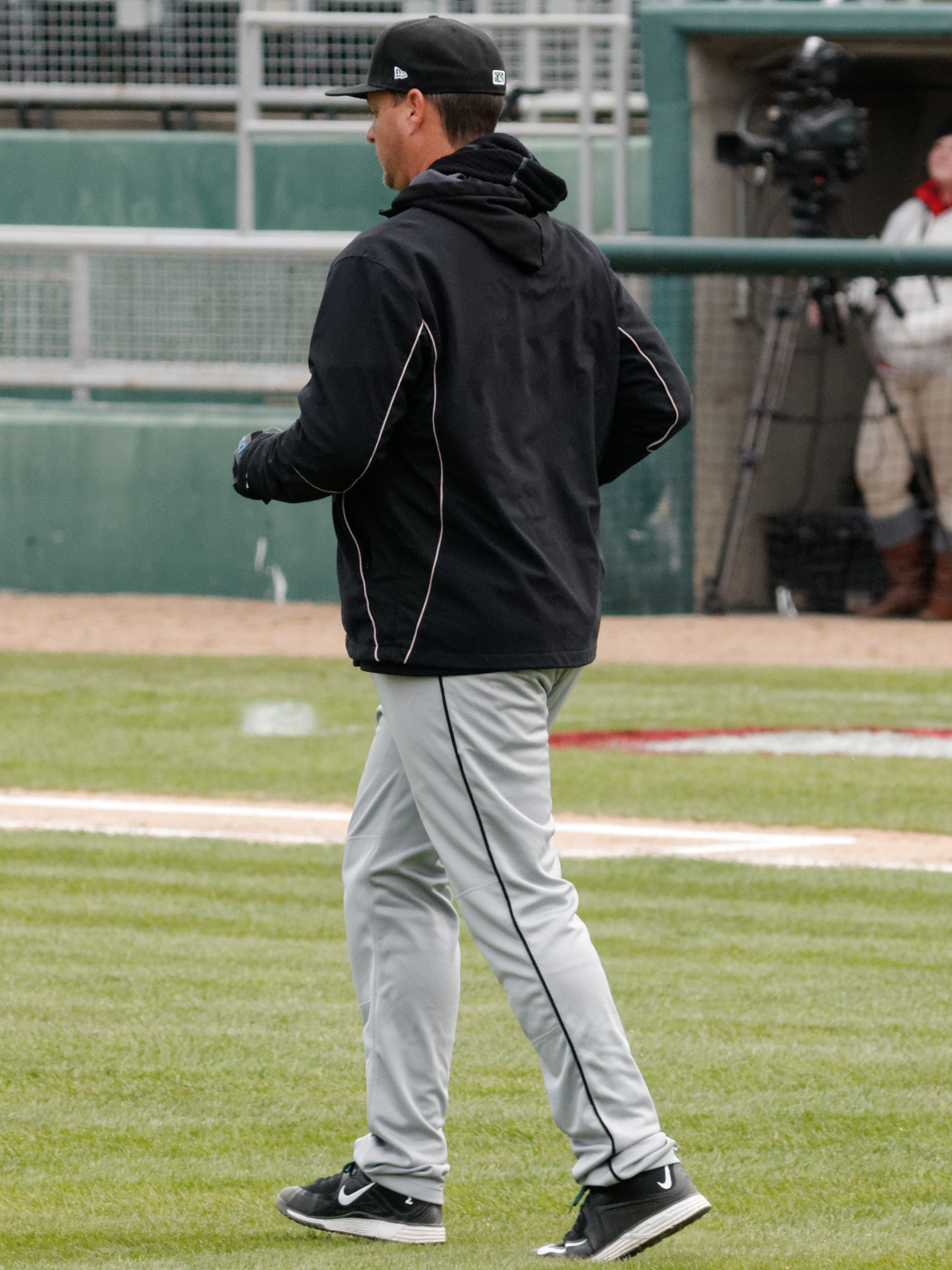
- Ebert with the Dayton Dragons in 2016
- Pitcher / Pitching Coach
- Born: August 21, 1976 (age 49); Anaheim, California
- Batted: Right Threw: Left

MLB debut
- April 6, 1999, for the Atlanta Braves

Last MLB appearance
- October 2, 1999, for the Atlanta Braves

MLB statistics
- Win–loss record: 0–1
- Earned run average: 5.63
- Strikeouts: 4
- Saves: 1
- Stats at Baseball Reference

Teams
- Atlanta Braves (1999)

Derrin Lee Ebert (born August 21, 1976) is an American former professional baseball relief pitcher for the Atlanta Braves of Major League Baseball (MLB). He has also been a coach in MLB and Minor League Baseball (MiLB) and is a current MiLB Salt Lake City Bees Pitching Coach.

== Amateur career ==
Ebert was born in Anaheim, California. He attended Hesperia High School in Hesperia, California. He was drafted by the Atlanta Braves in the 18th round (511th overall) in the 1994 Major League Baseball draft.

== Professional career ==
After being drafted, Ebert played in the Braves' minor league system for five seasons before making his major league debut on April 6, 1999, against the Philadelphia Phillies. He pitched three innings of relief, striking out one batter, and earning a save. He made two more appearances in April before being sent down to the Triple-A Richmond Braves. Ebert returned to Atlanta in September where he made two last MLB appearances. He ended the season, his lone year in the big leagues, with an 0–1 win–loss record, one save, four strikeouts, and a 5.63 earned run average in five games.

Ebert was granted free agency after the 2000 season, which he had spent with Triple-A Richmond. He next signed with the Tampa Bay Devil Rays, but was released during 2001's spring training. He then played in the minor league organizations of the Boston Red Sox (2001) and Milwaukee Brewers (2002). He signed with but was released by the Anaheim Angels before the start of the 2003 season. He subsequently signed on with the Chicago Cubs organization, playing for the Triple-A Iowa Cubs, before being traded to the Arizona Diamondbacks for Chris Donnels on May 29. He was released by Arizona in mid-July, and then re-signed with the Milwaukee Brewers on a minor league contract. He was released after the 2003 season, missed the 2004 campaign, but played in the Kansas City Royals organization in 2005 before retiring.

== Coaching career ==
From 2012 to 2013, Ebert served as the pitching coach for the Cincinnati Reds' rookie level Arizona League Reds. He coached in the same capacity for their rookie Billings Mustangs (2014–15) and Class A Dayton Dragons (2016–17). In 2018, he was the Reds' major league pitching coach and coached pitchers for the Arizona Fall League's Scottsdale Scorpions that offseason. He returned to Billings as pitching coach in 2019. In 2020, he became manager of the rookie Greeneville Reds.

== Film ==
In the 2011 movie Moneyball, starring Brad Pitt, Ebert played former Oakland Athletics pitcher Mike Magnante. Ebert won the role after auditioning when he was referred to the film's casting agency by a friend with whom he coached Little League baseball.
