= Pascual Matos =

Dominican baseball player (born 1974)

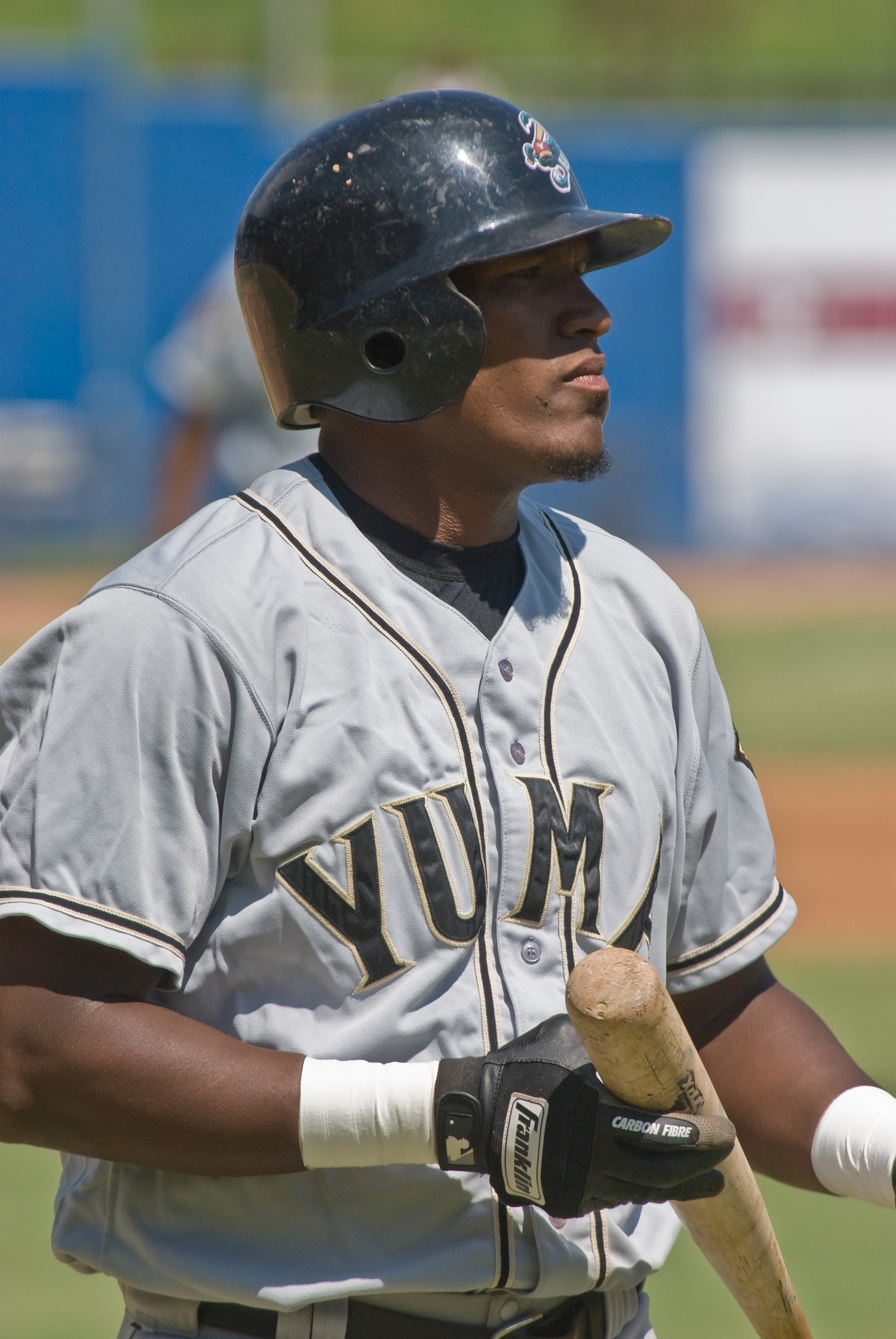
- Matos with the Yuma Bullfrogs in 2007
- Catcher
- Born: December 23, 1974 (age 51); Barahona Province, Dominican Republic
- Batted: Right Threw: Right

MLB debut
- May 11, 1999, for the Atlanta Braves

Last MLB appearance
- August 9, 1999, for the Atlanta Braves

MLB statistics
- Batting average: .125
- Home runs: 0
- Runs batted in: 2
- Stats at Baseball Reference

Teams
- Atlanta Braves (1999)
Medals
Men's baseball
Representing Dominican Republic
Central American and Caribbean Games
Bronze medal – third place	2002 San Salvador	Team

Pascual "Cuevas" Matos (born December 23, 1974) is a Dominican former Major League Baseball player. He played one season with the Atlanta Braves in 1999.
