= Kevin McGlinchy =

American baseball player (born 1977)

- Pitcher
- Born: June 28, 1977 (age 48); Malden, Massachusetts, U.S.
- Batted: Right Threw: Right

MLB debut
- April 5, 1999, for the Atlanta Braves

Last MLB appearance
- September 28, 2000, for the Atlanta Braves

MLB statistics
- Win–loss record: 7–3
- Earned run average: 2.75
- Strikeouts: 76
- Stats at Baseball Reference

Teams
- Atlanta Braves (1999–2000)

Kevin Michael McGlinchy (born June 28, 1977) is an American former professional baseball player who pitched in Major League Baseball (MLB) from 1999 to 2000 with the Atlanta Braves.

== Career ==
McGlinchy was drafted by the Atlanta Braves in the fifth round of the 1995 Major League Baseball draft from Malden High School in Malden, Massachusetts.

Despite never having previously pitched above Double-A, McGlinchy made the Major League roster in 1999 after impressing pitching coach Leo Mazzone with his composure in spring training. In the 1999 National League Championship Series, he gave up the famous Grand Slam Single to Robin Ventura. He later appeared in the 1999 World Series, pitching two scoreless innings in relief of Russ Springer at Yankee Stadium.

McGlinchy was on the Opening Day roster to start the 2000 season but was placed on the disabled list in April. McGlinchy was activated from the disabled list on May 14 after a rehabilitative assignment but returned to the disabled list on May 25. He returned from the disabled list in the first week of September. He appeared in what would be his final MLB game on September 28, 2000.

On March 13, 2001, Dr. James Andrews surgically repaired McGlinchy's partially torn rotator cuff. McGlinchy was only able to appear in two games in the 2001 season, both in the Gulf Coast League. Following the season, he was selected in the Rule 5 draft by the Tampa Bay Devil Rays. Following the 2002 season, McGlinchy was designated for assignment. In June 2003, he signed a contract with the Long Island Ducks of the independent Atlantic League. McGlinchy began the 2004 season in the Mexican League before signing a minor league contract with the Chicago Cubs and being assigned to Triple-A Iowa. McGlinchy returned to the Atlantic League in 2005 for his final season as a professional baseball player.

McGlinchy moved back to Massachusetts from Florida around 2006. In 2011, McGlinchy was pitching in amateur leagues in Boston and told the Boston Globe that he had "rededicat[ed him]self to baseball" and hoped to return to the majors. By 2012, McGlinchy was playing vintage baseball. McGlinchy now also umpires youth baseball.
