= Mike Remlinger =

American baseball player (born 1966)

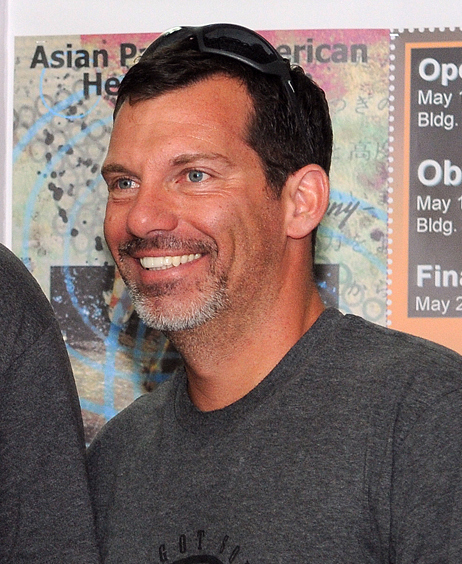
- Pitcher
- Born: March 23, 1966 (age 60); Middletown, New York, U.S.
- Batted: Left Threw: Left

MLB debut
- June 15, 1991, for the San Francisco Giants

Last MLB appearance
- June 26, 2006, for the Atlanta Braves

MLB statistics
- Win–loss record: 53–55
- Earned run average: 3.90
- Strikeouts: 854
- Stats at Baseball Reference

Teams
- San Francisco Giants (1991); New York Mets (1994–1995); Cincinnati Reds (1995–1998); Atlanta Braves (1999–2002); Chicago Cubs (2003–2005); Boston Red Sox (2005); Atlanta Braves (2006)

Career highlights and awards
- All-Star (2002)

Michael John Remlinger (born March 23, 1966) is an American former professional baseball relief pitcher. Remlinger has played in Major League Baseball (MLB) with the San Francisco Giants (1991), New York Mets (1994–95), Cincinnati Reds (1995–98), Atlanta Braves (1999–2002, 2006), Chicago Cubs (2003–2005), and the Boston Red Sox (2005). He had an All-Star appearance and his greatest success with the Braves. He bats and throws left-handed.

== Amateur career ==
A Dartmouth College graduate, Remlinger led the nation with a 1.59 ERA during his sophomore season. In 1987, he played collegiate summer baseball with the Wareham Gatemen of the Cape Cod Baseball League. He was selected by the San Francisco Giants with the 16th pick of the first round in the 1987 amateur draft.

== Professional career ==
Remlinger was a promising rookie for the San Francisco Giants when he was traded on December 11, 1991, along with former National League Most Valuable Player Kevin Mitchell to the Seattle Mariners for pitchers Mike Jackson, Bill Swift and Dave Burba. He played for the Mets and Reds before landing with the Atlanta Braves where he became a valuable member of their bullpen and making the National League All-Star team in 2002. He became a very durable relief pitcher later in his career as he pitched in 70 or more games for five straight seasons (1999–2003) and struck out 398 batters in 368 innings during this period. In a 16-season career, Remlinger compiled a 53–54 record with a 3.89 ERA and 20 saves in 634 games. He pitched a three-hit shutout in his first MLB start against the Pittsburgh Pirates.

Remlinger often pitched better against right-handed hitters, which is unusual for a left-handed pitcher.

On May 25, 2005, Mike Remlinger was placed on the 15-day Disabled List by the Chicago Cubs after breaking his left pinkie by getting it caught in a chair. At the time Remlinger was pitching quite poorly and many speculated the injury was a way of clearing roster space without putting Remlinger on waivers. Steve Stone, a baseball analyst and former Cubs broadcaster, often refers to having players "sit in the Remlinger chair" when they are playing badly during a season. Remlinger and cash were then traded to the Boston Red Sox for minor league pitcher Olivio Astacio. He was later released by Boston.

Remlinger signed a one-year minor league contract with the Atlanta Braves in January 2006 after being released by the Red Sox. The Braves invited him to Spring Training as a non-roster invitee, and later he was added to the 25-man roster.

The Braves designated Remlinger for assignment and later released him on June 26, 2006.

Remlinger posted a 4.03 ERA over 9 different postseason series.

== Trivia ==
Remlinger saved the pieces of a broken bat used by Sammy Sosa in a 2003 game, which was found to have cork embedded within it, in violation of MLB rules. He auctioned off the pieces in 2010.
