= 1991 Philadelphia Phillies season =

Major League Baseball season

1991 Philadelphia Phillies
- League: National League
- Division: East
- Ballpark: Veterans Stadium
- City: Philadelphia
- Record: 78–84 (.481)
- Divisional place: 3rd
- Owners: Bill Giles
- General managers: Lee Thomas
- Managers: Nick Leyva, Jim Fregosi
- Television: WTXF-TV (Harry Kalas, Richie Ashburn, Andy Musser); PRISM (Chris Wheeler, Jim Barniak, Garry Maddox); SportsChannel Philadelphia (Jim Fregosi, Andy Musser)
- Radio: WOGL (Harry Kalas, Richie Ashburn, Andy Musser, Chris Wheeler)

The 1991 Philadelphia Phillies season was the 109th season in the history of the franchise. The team finished with a 78–84 record. This was also the last season the team wore the 1970–91 era uniforms. The next season, the Phillies would bring back the old Whiz Kids era uniforms, which has remained their current uniform to this day.

== Offseason ==
- December 17, 1990: Danny Cox was signed as a free agent by the Phillies.
- January 11, 1991: Jim Lindeman was signed as a free agent by the Phillies.

== Regular season ==
On April 28, 1991, the Phillies recorded the first triple play in the history of Veterans Stadium. Tony Gwynn lined to second baseman Randy Ready. Ready stepped on second, and although he could have tagged the runner, threw to first baseman Ricky Jordan.

On May 6, 1991, Lenny Dykstra slammed his Mercedes-Benz red sports car into two trees while driving home from a bachelor party. Dykstra suffered three broken ribs, a broken right collarbone and a broken right cheekbone. A broken rib punctured a lung and his heart was bruised, according to doctors. Phillies' catcher Darren Daulton was also in the car with Dykstra. Daulton suffered a broken left eye socket, a scratched left cornea and a heart bruise, doctors said.

On May 23, 1991, Tommy Greene threw a no-hitter against the Montreal Expos in Montreal. Greene was starting for only the second time in the season and 15th time in his major league career. He became the first visiting pitcher to hurl a no-hitter in Montreal's history as the Phillies defeated the Expos, 2–0 before an Olympic Stadium crowd of 8,833. Greene was pitching in place of Danny Cox who had suffered a pulled groin in his last start. Greene walked seven batters but also struck out 10.

Playing against the Cincinnati Reds on June 14, 1991, Von Hayes was hit by a pitch by Tom Browning which broke his arm. Hayes returned to action on September 6, 1991, against Houston. Hayes was traded to the California Angels in the off-season but Hayes would later cite Browning's pitch as ending his career, "I broke my arm when I was hit by a pitch from Tom Browning... and I was finished. I tried to make a comeback (with California) in 1992, but it was no good."

From July 30 to August 12, the Phillies won 13 straight games, tying the franchise record (in the modern era) set by the 1977 Phillies. The Phillies swept the Montreal Expos twice during the streak and made up nine games in the standings. The streak also helped them move from last place in the NL East to third by season's end.

On October 6, 1991, the most strikeouts were recorded against the Phillies in franchise history as David Cone of their division rival New York Mets struck out 19, tying a then-National League record for most strikeouts in a game, set by Steve Carlton against the Mets in their championship season of 1969 and Tom Seaver the following year. It was also the most strikeouts ever recorded by a pitcher at Veterans Stadium. The Mets won the game 7–0.

=== Notable transactions ===
- April 7, 1991: Chuck McElroy and Bob Scanlan were traded by the Phillies to the Chicago Cubs for Mitch Williams.
- April 10, 1991: Rick Schu was signed as a free agent by the Phillies.
- July 21, 1991: Ricky Bottalico was signed by the Phillies as an amateur free agent.

=== Season standings ===
NL East
Team	W	L	Pct.	GB	Home	Road
Pittsburgh Pirates	98	64	.605	—	52‍–‍32	46‍–‍32
St. Louis Cardinals	84	78	.519	14	52‍–‍32	32‍–‍46
Philadelphia Phillies	78	84	.481	20	47‍–‍36	31‍–‍48
Chicago Cubs	77	83	.481	20	46‍–‍37	31‍–‍46
New York Mets	77	84	.478	20½	40‍–‍42	37‍–‍42
Montreal Expos	71	90	.441	26½	33‍–‍35	38‍–‍55

=== Record vs. opponents ===
1991 National League record Sources:
Team	ATL	CHC	CIN	HOU	LAD	MON	NYM	PHI	PIT	SD	SF	STL
Atlanta	—	6–6	11–7	13–5	7–11	5–7	9–3	5–7	9–3	11–7	9–9	9–3
Chicago	6–6	—	4–8	9–3	2–10	10–7	11–6	8–10	7–11	4–8	6–6	10–8
Cincinnati	7–11	8–4	—	9–9	6–12	6–6	5–7	9–3	2–10	8–10	10–8	4–8
Houston	5–13	3–9	9–9	—	8–10	2–10	7–5	7–5	4–8	6–12	9–9	5–7
Los Angeles	11–7	10–2	12–6	10–8	—	5–7	7–5	7–5	7–5	10–8	8–10	6–6
Montreal	7–5	7–10	6–6	10–2	7–5	—	4–14	4–14	6–12	6–6	7–5	7–11
New York	3–9	6–11	7–5	5–7	5–7	14–4	—	11–7	6–12	7–5	6–6	7–11
Philadelphia	7-5	10–8	3–9	5–7	5–7	14–4	7–11	—	6–12	9–3	6–6	6–12
Pittsburgh	3–9	11–7	10–2	8–4	5–7	12–6	12–6	12–6	—	7–5	7–5	11–7
San Diego	7–11	8–4	10–8	12–6	8–10	6–6	5–7	3–9	5–7	—	11–7	9–3
San Francisco	9–9	6–6	8–10	9–9	10–8	5–7	6–6	6–6	5–7	7–11	—	4–8
St. Louis	3–9	8–10	8–4	7–5	6–6	11–7	11–7	12–6	7–11	3–9	8–4	—

=== 1991 Game Log ===
Legend
	Phillies win
	Phillies loss
	Postponement
**Bold**	Phillies team member

1991 Game Log
Overall Record: 78–84
April (9–12)

#	Date	Opponent	Score	Win	Loss	Save	Attendance	Record
1	April 8	@ Mets	1–2	Dwight Gooden (1–0)	**Terry Mulholland** (0–1)	John Franco (1)	49,276	0–1
2	April 9	@ Mets	1–2 (10)	Doug Simons (1–0)	**Joe Boever** (0–1)	None	16,013	0–2
3	April 10	@ Mets	8–7 (10)	**Roger McDowell** (1–0)	Jeff Innis (0–1)	**Mitch Williams** (1)	22,841	1–2
4	April 12	Cardinals	11–4	**Pat Combs** (1–0)	Jamie Moyer (0–1)	None	38,227	2–2
5	April 13	Cardinals	4–2	**Terry Mulholland** (1–1)	Bob Tewksbury (0–1)	**Mitch Williams** (2)	15,485	3–2
6	April 14	Cardinals	7–11	Bryn Smith (2–0)	**Dave LaPoint** (0–1)	Lee Smith (3)	20,337	3–3
7	April 15	@ Cubs	4–5	Greg Maddux (2–0)	**Jason Grimsley** (0–1)	Dave Smith (3)	27,794	3–4
8	April 16	@ Cubs	3–4 (13)	Mike Bielecki (2–0)	**Mitch Williams** (0–1)	None	11,571	3–5
9	April 17	@ Cubs	1–4	Shawn Boskie (1–1)	**Pat Combs** (1–1)	Dave Smith (4)	13,680	3–6
–	April 18	Cardinals	Postponed (rain); Makeup: April 20 as a traditional double-header					
10	April 19	Cardinals	1–3	Bob Tewksbury (1–1)	**Terry Mulholland** (1–2)	Lee Smith (5)	21,468	3–7
11	April 20 (1)	Cardinals	1–12	José DeLeón (1–1)	**Jason Grimsley** (0–2)	Omar Olivares (1)	see 2nd game	3–8
12	April 20 (2)	Cardinals	6–5 (10)	**Roger McDowell** (2–0)	Cris Carpenter (1–1)	**Mitch Williams** (3)	27,482	4–8
13	April 21	Cardinals	6–7 (10)	Lee Smith (1–0)	**Mitch Williams** (0–2)	None	26,701	4–9
14	April 23	Mets	1–2	Ron Darling (1–1)	**Jason Grimsley** (0–3)	John Franco (4)	20,187	4–10
15	April 24	Mets	3–7	Pete Schourek (1–0)	**Darrel Akerfelds** (0–1)	None	15,214	4–11
16	April 25	Mets	5–3	**Roger McDowell** (3–0)	Doug Simons (1–1)	**Mitch Williams** (4)	22,099	5–11
17	April 26	Padres	0–4	Bruce Hurst (2–0)	**José DeJesús** (0–1)	None	19,363	5–12
18	April 27	Padres	4–3 (12)	**Darrel Akerfelds** (1–1)	Mike Maddux (2–1)	None	20,334	6–12
19	April 28	Padres	9–2	**Jason Grimsley** (1–3)	Eric Nolte (3–1)	None	39,332	7–12
20	April 29	Padres	7–2	**Terry Mulholland** (2–2)	Ed Whitson (1–3)	None	12,359	8–12
21	April 30	Giants	11–9	**Joe Boever** (1–1)	Jeff Brantley (0–1)	**Mitch Williams** (5)	15,500	9–12

May (13–13)

#	Date	Opponent	Score	Win	Loss	Save	Attendance	Record
22	May 1	Giants	4–1	**Tommy Greene** (1–0)	Mike LaCoss (1–2)	**Roger McDowell** (1)	17,281	10–12
23	May 3	Dodgers	1–7	Ramón Martínez (4–1)	**Danny Cox** (0–1)	None	29,364	10–13
24	May 4	Dodgers	4–3	**Terry Mulholland** (3–2)	Jay Howell (0–1)	**Mitch Williams** (6)	30,106	11–13
25	May 5	Dodgers	2–3	Mike Morgan (3–2)	**Joe Boever** (1–2)	Jay Howell (2)	44,160	11–14
26	May 7	@ Padres	2–4	Bruce Hurst (4–0)	**José DeJesús** (0–2)	Craig Lefferts (7)	23,172	11–15
27	May 8	@ Padres	5–2	**Danny Cox** (1–1)	Andy Benes (0–4)	**Roger McDowell** (2)	12,063	12–15
28	May 9	@ Padres	9–6	**Terry Mulholland** (4–2)	Derek Lilliquist (0–2)	**Mitch Williams** (7)	43,153	13–15
29	May 10	@ Dodgers	1–3	Bob Ojeda (2–3)	**Joe Boever** (1–3)	John Candelaria (2)	44,255	13–16
30	May 11	@ Dodgers	2–3	Mike Morgan (4–2)	**Pat Combs** (1–2)	Jay Howell (4)	40,335	13–17
31	May 12	@ Dodgers	7–3	**José DeJesús** (1–2)	Tim Belcher (3–4)	None	33,208	14–17
32	May 13	@ Giants	3–2 (11)	**Joe Boever** (2–3)	Rod Beck (0–1)	None	7,901	15–17
33	May 14	@ Giants	9–0	**Terry Mulholland** (5–2)	Kelly Downs (1–2)	None	8,656	16–17
34	May 15	@ Giants	2–4	Bud Black (4–3)	**Jason Grimsley** (1–4)	Jeff Brantley (3)	12,661	16–18
35	May 17	Cubs	1–0 (16)	**Tommy Greene** (2–0)	Les Lancaster (0–1)	None	28,044	17–18
36	May 18	Cubs	5–2	**Joe Boever** (3–3)	Paul Assenmacher (2–1)	**Mitch Williams** (8)	34,877	18–18
37	May 19	Cubs	1–2 (10)	Mike Bielecki (5–2)	**Roger McDowell** (3–1)	Dave Smith (10)	27,830	18–19
38	May 21	@ Expos	0–3	Dennis Martínez (6–3)	**Jason Grimsley** (1–5)	None	12,002	18–20
39	May 22	@ Expos	8–1	**Pat Combs** (2–2)	Brian Barnes (0–2)	None	15,331	19–20
40	May 23	@ Expos	2–0	**Tommy Greene** (3–0)	Oil Can Boyd (2–5)	None	8,833	20–20
41	May 24	@ Pirates	1–9	Zane Smith (6–2)	**Terry Mulholland** (5–3)	None	29,770	20–21
42	May 25	@ Pirates	2–4 (11)	Vicente Palacios (3–2)	**Joe Boever** (3–4)	None	24,358	20–22
43	May 26	@ Pirates	2–5	John Smiley (7–1)	**Jason Grimsley** (1–6)	Bill Landrum (7)	26,117	20–23
44	May 27	Expos	1–8	Chris Nabholz (2–3)	**Pat Combs** (2–3)	None	18,028	20–24
45	May 28	Expos	12–0	**Tommy Greene** (4–0)	Oil Can Boyd (2–6)	None	16,850	21–24
46	May 29	Expos	2–1	**Terry Mulholland** (6–3)	Barry Jones (2–2)	**Mitch Williams** (9)	30,828	22–24
47	May 31	Pirates	1–5	Bob Walk (1–0)	**Jason Grimsley** (1–7)	None	25,652	22–25

June (10–18)

#	Date	Opponent	Score	Win	Loss	Save	Attendance	Record
48	June 1	Pirates	3–5	John Smiley (8–1)	**Pat Combs** (2–4)	Bill Landrum (9)	31,601	22–26
49	June 2	Pirates	3–5	Bob Walk (2–0)	**Mitch Williams** (0–3)	Bob Patterson (1)	36,185	22–27
50	June 4	@ Braves	5–9	Tom Glavine (9–2)	**Terry Mulholland** (6–4)	None	30,165	22–28
51	June 5	@ Braves	12–11 (12)	**Darrel Akerfelds** (2–1)	Jeff Parrett (0–2)	**José DeJesús** (1)	16,937	23–28
52	June 6	@ Braves	4–9	Charlie Leibrandt (5–4)	**Pat Combs** (2–5)	None	15,682	23–29
53	June 7	@ Reds	5–4	**Tommy Greene** (5–0)	Jack Armstrong (4–5)	**Mitch Williams** (10)	35,827	24–29
54	June 8	@ Reds	4–1	**José DeJesús** (2–2)	Chris Hammond (3–5)	**Roger McDowell** (3)	37,457	25–29
55	June 9	@ Reds	3–6	Tom Browning (8–4)	**Terry Mulholland** (6–5)	Rob Dibble (15)	29,748	25–30
56	June 10	@ Reds	3–9	José Rijo (5–2)	**Andy Ashby** (0–1)	None	27,567	25–31
57	June 11	@ Astros	0–1 (11)	Al Osuna (2–2)	**Roger McDowell** (3–2)	None	7,953	25–32
58	June 12	@ Astros	2–3	Al Osuna (3–2)	**Joe Boever** (3–5)	None	8,374	25–33
59	June 13	@ Astros	5–4	**José DeJesús** (3–2)	Darryl Kile (0–2)	**Mitch Williams** (11)	14,362	26–33
60	June 14	Reds	2–4	Tom Browning (9–4)	**Terry Mulholland** (6–6)	Rob Dibble (17)	26,067	26–34
61	June 15	Reds	1–3	José Rijo (6–2)	**Andy Ashby** (0–2)	Rob Dibble (18)	32,075	26–35
62	June 16	Reds	6–8	Randy Myers (3–4)	**Roger McDowell** (3–3)	Don Carman (1)	41,905	26–36
63	June 17	Braves	4–3	**Mitch Williams** (1–3)	Juan Berenguer (0–2)	None	18,517	27–36
64	June 18	Braves	8–4	**José DeJesús** (4–2)	Pete Smith (1–1)	None	12,405	28–36
65	June 19	Braves	2–9	Tom Glavine (11–3)	**Terry Mulholland** (6–7)	None	23,989	28–37
66	June 20	Astros	7–3	**Danny Cox** (2–1)	Jimmy Jones (4–5)	None	23,415	29–37
67	June 21	Astros	3–0	**Bruce Ruffin** (1–0)	Mark Portugal (6–3)	**Mitch Williams** (12)	21,120	30–37
68	June 22	Astros	3–4 (10)	Al Osuna (4–2)	**Roger McDowell** (3–4)	Mike Capel (2)	25,506	30–38
69	June 23	Astros	4–6	Darryl Kile (1–2)	**José DeJesús** (4–3)	Jim Clancy (3)	23,455	30–39
70	June 25	@ Cardinals	9–10	Scott Terry (2–1)	**Roger McDowell** (3–5)	Lee Smith (19)	30,798	30–40
71	June 26	@ Cardinals	1–14	Bryn Smith (6–4)	**Pat Combs** (2–6)	None	25,706	30–41
72	June 27	@ Cardinals	2–4	Ken Hill (7–5)	**Tommy Greene** (5–1)	Lee Smith (20)	26,419	30–42
73	June 28	@ Mets	6–2	**José DeJesús** (5–3)	Ron Darling (4–5)	None	33,511	31–42
74	June 29	@ Mets	0–5	Wally Whitehurst (4–4)	**Terry Mulholland** (6–8)	None	46,244	31–43
75	June 30	@ Mets	10–9	**Danny Cox** (3–1)	Dwight Gooden (7–6)	**Mitch Williams** (13)	44,310	32–43

July (10–15)

#	Date	Opponent	Score	Win	Loss	Save	Attendance	Record
76	July 1	Cardinals	0–1	Bryn Smith (7–4)	**Bruce Ruffin** (1–1)	Lee Smith (21)	17,281	32–44
77	July 2	Cardinals	1–6	Ken Hill (8–5)	**Tommy Greene** (5–2)	Lee Smith (22)	16,847	32–45
78	July 3	Cardinals	3–4	Omar Olivares (2–1)	**José DeJesús** (5–4)	Lee Smith (23)	50,156	32–46
79	July 4	Cardinals	7–1	**Terry Mulholland** (7–8)	Bob Tewksbury (6–5)	None	14,921	33–46
80	July 5	Mets	1–3	Dwight Gooden (8–6)	**Danny Cox** (3–2)	John Franco (18)	51,314	33–47
81	July 6	Mets	1–2	Frank Viola (10–5)	**Bruce Ruffin** (1–2)	John Franco (19)	35,067	33–48
82	July 7	Mets	2–8	David Cone (8–5)	**Tommy Greene** (5–3)	None	35,444	33–49
–	July 9	**1991 Major League Baseball All-Star Game at SkyDome in Toronto**						
83	July 11	Giants	3–2	**Terry Mulholland** (8–8)	Trevor Wilson (4–8)	**Mitch Williams** (14)	22,355	34–49
84	July 12	Giants	1–0	**Tommy Greene** (6–3)	Bud Black (6–8)	**Mitch Williams** (15)	21,221	35–49
85	July 13	Giants	5–7	Francisco Oliveras (4–2)	**Wally Ritchie** (0–1)	Dave Righetti (12)	23,017	35–50
86	July 14	Giants	5–17	Kelly Downs (5–4)	**Danny Cox** (3–3)	None	28,338	35–51
87	July 15	Dodgers	9–8	**Steve Searcy** (2–2)	Tim Crews (2–2)	**Mitch Williams** (16)	31,262	36–51
88	July 16	Dodgers	3–1	**Terry Mulholland** (9–8)	Bob Ojeda (7–7)	None	28,622	37–51
89	July 17	Dodgers	4–2	**Tommy Greene** (7–3)	John Candelaria (0–1)	**Mitch Williams** (17)	33,651	38–51
90	July 19	@ Padres	4–1	**José DeJesús** (6–4)	Dennis Rasmussen (3–6)	**Mitch Williams** (18)	21,621	39–51
91	July 20	@ Padres	4–0	**Bruce Ruffin** (2–2)	Greg W. Harris (2–2)	None	15,882	40–51
92	July 21	@ Padres	2–5	Bruce Hurst (11–5)	**Terry Mulholland** (9–9)	None	18,053	40–52
93	July 23	@ Dodgers	5–6 (10)	Jay Howell (3–2)	**Roger McDowell** (3–6)	None	48,925	40–53
94	July 24	@ Dodgers	1–2	John Candelaria (1–1)	**Steve Searcy** (2–3)	None	36,127	40–54
95	July 25	@ Dodgers	0–5	Ramón Martínez (13–5)	**Bruce Ruffin** (2–3)	None	39,626	40–55
96	July 26	@ Giants	2–3	Kelly Downs (6–4)	**Terry Mulholland** (9–10)	Dave Righetti (14)	15,083	40–56
97	July 27	@ Giants	0–3	Paul McClellan (1–0)	**Danny Cox** (3–4)	Dave Righetti (15)	26,132	40–57
98	July 28	@ Giants	1–2	Bud Black (8–8)	**Tommy Greene** (7–4)	Jeff Brantley (9)	36,268	40–58
99	July 30	Padres	2–1	**José DeJesús** (7–4)	Dennis Rasmussen (3–8)	**Mitch Williams** (19)	22,946	41–58
100	July 31	Padres	9–3	**Bruce Ruffin** (3–3)	Greg W. Harris (2–3)	None	24,779	42–58

August (20–9)

#	Date	Opponent	Score	Win	Loss	Save	Attendance	Record
101	August 1	@ Expos	4–1	**Terry Mulholland** (10–10)	Mark Gardner (5–8)	None	24,953	43–58
102	August 2	@ Expos	6–5 (11)	**Mitch Williams** (2–3)	Mel Rojas (0–3)	**Mike Hartley** (2)	18,638	44–58
103	August 3	@ Expos	7–1	**Tommy Greene** (8–4)	Brian Barnes (2–4)	None	21,939	45–58
104	August 4	@ Expos	3–2 (10)	**Mitch Williams** (3–3)	Jeff Fassero (1–2)	None	17,976	46–58
105	August 6	Cubs	6–2 (11)	**Mitch Williams** (4–3)	Les Lancaster (7–5)	None	26,562	47–58
106	August 7	Cubs	5–4 (11)	**Mitch Williams** (5–3)	Les Lancaster (7–6)	None	26,294	48–58
107	August 8	Cubs	11–1	**Danny Cox** (4–4)	Danny Jackson (1–3)	None	32,232	49–58
108	August 9	Expos	5–4	**Mitch Williams** (6–3)	Dave Wainhouse (0–1)	None	13,297	50–58
109	August 10	Expos	4–2	**José DeJesús** (8–4)	Scott Ruskin (3–3)	**Mitch Williams** (20)	31,006	51–58
110	August 11	Expos	5–4	**Mike Hartley** (3–0)	Jeff Fassero (1–3)	**Mitch Williams** (21)	35,274	52–58
111	August 12	Expos	2–1	**Terry Mulholland** (11–10)	Dennis Martínez (11–7)	None	31,001	53–58
112	August 13	@ Pirates	3–4	Doug Drabek (11–11)	**Danny Cox** (4–5)	Stan Belinda (10)	22,584	53–59
113	August 14	@ Pirates	3–5	John Smiley (14–8)	**Tommy Greene** (8–5)	Stan Belinda (11)	42,501	53–60
114	August 15	@ Pirates	6–4	**José DeJesús** (9–4)	Neal Heaton (3–2)	**Mitch Williams** (22)	28,193	54–60
115	August 16	@ Cubs	1–9	Rick Sutcliffe (3–4)	**Bruce Ruffin** (3–4)	None	34,547	54–61
116	August 17	@ Cubs	5–2	**Terry Mulholland** (12–10)	Mike Bielecki (11–8)	**Mitch Williams** (23)	33,223	55–61
117	August 18	@ Cubs	6–7 (10)	Paul Assenmacher (6–4)	**Mitch Williams** (6–4)	None	32,801	55–62
118	August 20	Pirates	6–5	**Steve Searcy** (3–3)	Stan Belinda (3–4)	None	23,336	56–62
119	August 21	Pirates	6–5	**Mitch Williams** (7–4)	Bob Kipper (2–2)	None	35,591	57–62
120	August 22	Pirates	4–3 (11)	**Mitch Williams** (8–4)	Bill Landrum (1–3)	None	41,544	58–62
121	August 23	@ Braves	2–4	Tom Glavine (16–8)	**Terry Mulholland** (12–11)	Mark Wohlers (2)	43,161	58–63
122	August 24	@ Braves	6–5	**Mitch Williams** (9–4)	Tony Castillo (1–1)	None	43,966	59–63
123	August 25	@ Braves	6–5	**Tommy Greene** (9–5)	Steve Avery (13–8)	**Mitch Williams** (24)	26,027	60–63
124	August 26	@ Reds	4–5	Kip Gross (6–4)	**Mike Hartley** (3–1)	Rob Dibble (25)	18,683	60–64
125	August 27	@ Reds	2–4	Scott Scudder (5–4)	**Bruce Ruffin** (3–5)	Rob Dibble (26)	17,787	60–65
126	August 28	Astros	11–10 (10)	**Mike Hartley** (4–1)	Al Osuna (7–4)	None	24,981	61–65
127	August 29	Astros	1–5	Mark Portugal (10–6)	**Danny Cox** (4–6)	None	20,321	61–66
128	August 30	Braves	1–6	Steve Avery (14–8)	**Tommy Greene** (9–6)	None	22,708	61–67
129	August 31	Braves	5–0	**José DeJesús** (10–4)	Armando Reynoso (2–1)	None	30,259	62–67

September (13–15)

#	Date	Opponent	Score	Win	Loss	Save	Attendance	Record
130	September 1	Braves	5–4 (10)	**Mitch Williams** (10–4)	Mark Wohlers (1–1)	None	25,141	63–67
131	September 2	Reds	8–5	**Terry Mulholland** (13–11)	Tom Browning (13–9)	**Mitch Williams** (25)	15,175	64–67
132	September 3	Reds	5–8	José Rijo (12–4)	**Cliff Brantley** (0–1)	Rob Dibble (28)	15,565	64–68
133	September 4	Reds	1–5	Randy Myers (6–12)	**Tommy Greene** (9–7)	None	15,962	64–69
134	September 6	@ Astros	1–3	Pete Harnisch (9–8)	**José DeJesús** (10–5)	Al Osuna (11)	7,868	64–70
135	September 7	@ Astros	0–6	Darryl Kile (7–9)	**Bruce Ruffin** (3–6)	None	12,952	64–71
136	September 8	@ Astros	5–0	**Terry Mulholland** (14–11)	Ryan Bowen (4–3)	None	7,847	65–71
137	September 9	@ Cardinals	2–4	Omar Olivares (8–5)	**Andy Ashby** (0–3)	Lee Smith (38)	16,597	65–72
138	September 10	@ Cardinals	5–2	**Tommy Greene** (10–7)	Rhéal Cormier (2–3)	**Mitch Williams** (26)	16,210	66–72
139	September 11	Expos	5–6	Bill Sampen (8–4)	**Wally Ritchie** (0–2)	Barry Jones (12)	13,501	66–73
140	September 12	Expos	2–6	Chris Nabholz (5–7)	**Bruce Ruffin** (3–7)	None	13,243	66–74
141	September 13	Pirates	6–8	Stan Belinda (6–5)	**Mitch Williams** (10–5)	Rosario Rodríguez (4)	29,107	66–75
142	September 14	Pirates	3–5	John Smiley (18–8)	**Andy Ashby** (0–4)	Vicente Palacios (3)	27,412	66–76
143	September 15	Pirates	8–3	**Tommy Greene** (11–7)	Randy Tomlin (8–6)	**Mitch Williams** (27)	35,560	67–76
144	September 16	Cardinals	0–3	Bob Tewksbury (10–11)	**José DeJesús** (10–6)	Lee Smith (41)	13,892	67–77
145	September 17	Cardinals	4–2	**Cliff Brantley** (1–1)	Ken Hill (9–10)	**Mitch Williams** (28)	14,059	68–77
146	September 18	Expos	1–0	**Terry Mulholland** (15–11)	Dennis Martínez (14–10)	None	5,963	69–77
147	September 19	Expos	5–4 (10)	**Mitch Williams** (11–5)	Scott Ruskin (3–4)	None	5,297	70–77
148	September 20	@ Pirates	8–3	**Tommy Greene** (12–7)	Randy Tomlin (8–7)	None	22,691	71–77
149	September 21	@ Pirates	0–7	Zane Smith (16–10)	**José DeJesús** (10–7)	None	27,162	71–78
150	September 22	@ Pirates	1–2	Doug Drabek (15–13)	**Cliff Brantley** (1–2)	None	33,662	71–79
151	September 23	@ Cubs	3–10	Greg Maddux (13–10)	**Terry Mulholland** (15–12)	None	16,141	71–80
152	September 24	@ Cubs	4–2	**Andy Ashby** (1–4)	Mike Bielecki (13–11)	**Mitch Williams** (29)	19,694	72–80
153	September 25	@ Cubs	5–4	**Tommy Greene** (13–7)	Shawn Boskie (4–9)	**Mitch Williams** (30)	9,892	73–80
154	September 27	@ Mets	4–6	Pete Schourek (5–4)	**José DeJesús** (10–8)	John Franco (29)	13,680	73–81
155	September 28	@ Mets	6–2	**Cliff Brantley** (2–2)	Anthony Young (2–4)	None	16,967	74–81
156	September 29	@ Mets	3–4	Frank Viola (13–15)	**Terry Mulholland** (15–13)	John Franco (30)	16,573	74–82
157	September 30	Cubs	6–5	**Wally Ritchie** (1–2)	Paul Assenmacher (7–7)	None	12,109	75–82

October (3–2)

#	Date	Opponent	Score	Win	Loss	Save	Attendance	Record
158	October 1	Cubs	6–5 (13)	**Bruce Ruffin** (4–7)	Paul Assenmacher (7–8)	None	12,291	76–82
159	October 2	Cubs	0–1	Greg Maddux (14–11)	**José DeJesús** (10–9)	None	13,680	76–83
160	October 4	Mets	5–4 (10)	**Mitch Williams** (12–5)	John Franco (5–9)	None	20,720	77–83
161	October 5	Mets	1–0	**Terry Mulholland** (16–13)	Anthony Young (2–5)	None	22,281	78–83
162	October 6	Mets	0–7	David Cone (14–14)	**Andy Ashby** (1–5)	None	29,676	78–84

=== Roster ===
1991 Philadelphia Phillies
**Roster**
**Pitchers**: 35 Darrel Akerfelds; 40 Andy Ashby; 30 Joe Boever; 51 Cliff Brantley; 44 Amalio Carreño; 38 Pat Combs; 34 Danny Cox; 54 José DeJesús; 49 Tommy Greene; 48 Jason Grimsley; 42 Mike Hartley; 42 Dave LaPoint; 52 Tim Mauser; 13 Roger McDowell; 45 Terry Mulholland; 39 Wally Ritchie; 47 Bruce Ruffin; 50 Steve Searcy; 28 Mitch Williams	**Catchers**: 10 Darren Daulton; 24 Darrin Fletcher; 25 Steve Lake; 35 Doug Lindsey; **Infielders**: 6 Wally Backman; 7 Kim Batiste; 37 Rod Booker; 8 Charlie Hayes; 15 Dave Hollins; 17 Ricky Jordan; 19 John Kruk; 12 Mickey Morandini; 23 Randy Ready; 27 Rick Schu; 21 Dickie Thon	**Outfielders**: 16 Sil Campusano; 16 Braulio Castillo; 44,31 Wes Chamberlain; 4 Lenny Dykstra; 9 Von Hayes; 19 Jim Lindeman; 33 John Morris; 3 Dale Murphy; **Other batters**: 26 Ron Jones	**Manager**: 11 Jim Fregosi; 16 Nick Leyva; **Coaches**: 2 Larry Bowa (third base); 22 Hal Lanier (first base); 14 Denis Menke (hitting); 46 Johnny Podres (pitching); 18 John Vukovich (bench); 5 Mike Ryan (bullpen)

== Player stats ==
=== Batting ===
==== Starters by position ====
Note: Pos = Position; G = Games played; AB = At bats; H = Hits; Avg. = Batting average; HR = Home runs; RBI = Runs batted in

Pos	Player	G	AB	H	Avg.	HR	RBI
C	Darren Daulton	89	285	56	.196	12	42
1B	John Kruk	152	538	158	.294	21	92
2B	Mickey Morandini	98	325	81	.249	1	20
3B	Charlie Hayes	142	460	106	.230	12	53
SS	Dickie Thon	146	539	136	.252	9	44
LF	Wes Chamberlain	101	383	92	.240	13	50
CF	Lenny Dykstra	63	246	73	.297	3	12
RF	Dale Murphy	153	544	137	.252	18	81

==== Other batters ====
Note: G = Games played; AB = At bats; H = Hits; Avg. = Batting average; HR = Home runs; RBI = Runs batted in

Player	G	AB	H	Avg.	HR	RBI
Ricky Jordan	101	301	82	.272	9	49
Von Hayes	77	284	64	.225	0	21
Randy Ready	76	205	51	.249	1	20
Wally Backman	94	185	45	.243	0	15
Steve Lake	58	158	36	.228	1	11
Dave Hollins	56	151	45	.298	6	21
Darrin Fletcher	46	136	31	.228	1	12
John Morris	85	127	28	.220	1	6
Jim Lindeman	65	95	32	.337	0	12
Rod Booker	28	53	12	.226	0	7
Braulio Castillo	28	52	9	.173	0	2
Sil Campusano	15	35	4	.114	1	2
Kim Batiste	10	27	6	.222	0	1
Ron Jones	28	26	4	.154	0	3
Rick Schu	17	22	2	.091	0	2
Doug Lindsey	1	3	0	.000	0	0

=== Pitching ===
==== Starting pitchers ====
Note: G = Games pitched; IP = Innings pitched; W = Wins; L = Losses; ERA = Earned run average; SO = Strikeouts

Player	G	IP	W	L	ERA	SO
Terry Mulholland	34	232.0	16	13	3.61	142
Tommy Greene	36	207.2	13	7	3.38	154
José DeJesús	31	181.2	10	9	3.42	118
Danny Cox	23	102.1	4	6	4.57	46
Pat Combs	14	64.1	2	6	4.90	41
Jason Grimsley	12	61.0	1	7	4.87	42
Alan Ashby	8	42.0	1	5	6.00	26
Cliff Brantley	6	31.2	2	2	3.41	25
Dave LaPoint	2	5.0	0	1	16.20	3

==== Other pitchers ====
Note: G = Games pitched; IP = Innings pitched; W = Wins; L = Losses; ERA = Earned run average; SO = Strikeouts

Player	G	IP	W	L	ERA	SO
Bruce Ruffin	31	119.0	4	7	3.78	85

==== Relief pitchers ====
Note: G = Games pitched; W = Wins; L = Losses; SV = Saves; ERA = Earned run average; SO = Strikeouts

Player	G	W	L	SV	ERA	SO
Mitch Williams	69	12	5	30	2.34	84
Joe Boever	68	3	5	0	3.84	89
Wally Ritchie	39	1	2	0	7.59	6
Roger McDowell	38	3	6	3	3.20	28
Darrel Akerfelds	30	2	1	0	5.26	31
Steve Searcy	18	2	1	0	4.15	21
Mike Hartley	18	2	1	1	3.76	19
Tim Mauser	3	0	0	0	7.59	6
Amalio Carreño	3	0	0	0	16.20	2

== Farm system ==
Level	Team	League	Manager
AAA	Scranton/Wilkes-Barre; Red Barons	International League	Bill Dancy
AA	Reading Phillies	Eastern League	Don McCormack
A	Clearwater Phillies	Florida State League	Lee Elia
A	Spartanburg Phillies	South Atlantic League	Mel Roberts
A-Short Season	Batavia Clippers	New York–Penn League	Ramón Avilés
Rookie	Martinsville Phillies	Appalachian League	Roly de Armas
