= 1991 Pittsburgh Pirates season =

1991 Pittsburgh Pirates
- National League East champions
- League: National League
- Division: East
- Ballpark: Three Rivers Stadium
- City: Pittsburgh, Pennsylvania
- Record: 98–64 (.605)
- Divisional place: 1st
- Owners: Pittsburgh Associates
- General managers: Larry Doughty
- Managers: Jim Leyland
- Television: KDKA-TV; KBL
- Radio: KDKA-AM (Steve Blass, Kent Derdivanis, Lanny Frattare, Jim Rooker)

The 1991 Pittsburgh Pirates season was the 110th in franchise history; the 105th in the National League. This was their 22nd season at Three Rivers Stadium. For the second consecutive season, the Pirates won the National League East title with a record of 98–64. The Pirates finished the season with the best record in Major League Baseball. They were defeated four games to three by the Atlanta Braves in the NLCS. During the season, John Smiley won 20 games – the last to do so for the Pirates in the 20th century.

== Offseason ==
- December 6, 1990: Zane Smith was signed as a free agent by the Pirates.
- February 4, 1991: Mark Huismann was signed as a free agent by the Pirates.
- March 21, 1991: Esteban Loaiza was signed as an amateur free agent by the Pirates.
- March 29, 1991: Steve Carter was traded by the Pirates to the Chicago Cubs for Gary Varsho.

== Regular season ==
=== Season standings ===
NL East
Team	W	L	Pct.	GB	Home	Road
Pittsburgh Pirates	98	64	.605	—	52‍–‍32	46‍–‍32
St. Louis Cardinals	84	78	.519	14	52‍–‍32	32‍–‍46
Philadelphia Phillies	78	84	.481	20	47‍–‍36	31‍–‍48
Chicago Cubs	77	83	.481	20	46‍–‍37	31‍–‍46
New York Mets	77	84	.478	20½	40‍–‍42	37‍–‍42
Montreal Expos	71	90	.441	26½	33‍–‍35	38‍–‍55

=== Game log ===
1991 Game Log (98–64)
April (13–7)

#	Date	Opponent	Score	Win	Loss	Save	Attendance	Record
1	April 8	Expos	0–7	Martinez	**Drabek**	—	54,274	0–1
2	April 9	Expos	4–3	**Kipper**	Frey	**Landrum**	6,624	1–1
3	April 10	Expos	6–3	**Smith**	Boyd	**Belinda**	7,656	2–1
4	April 12	@ Cubs	3–1	**Smiley**	Boskie	**Palacios**	8,704	3–1
5	April 13	@ Cubs	3–7	Bielecki	**Drabek**	—	23,838	3–2
6	April 14	@ Cubs	4–6	Slocumb	**Belinda**	Smith	25,994	3–3
7	April 15	Mets	3–9	Cone	**Kipper**	—	6,785	3–4
8	April 16	Mets	4–2	**Tomlin**	Whitehurst	**Belinda**	16,963	4–4
9	April 17	Mets	4–0	**Smiley**	Darling	—	14,792	5–4
10	April 18	Cubs	2–3	Sutcliffe	**Drabek**	Assenmacher	9,148	5–5
11	April 19	Cubs	5–4	**Belinda**	Smith	—	13,157	6–5
12	April 20	Cubs	9–3	**Smith**	Maddux	—	13,179	7–5
13	April 21	Cubs	13–12 (11)	**Patterson**	Bielecki	—	10,860	8–5
14	April 23	@ Expos	7–3	**Smiley**	Sampen	—	7,770	9–5
15	April 24	@ Expos	2–1	**Drabek**	Martinez	**Landrum**	8,592	10–5
16	April 25	@ Expos	8–0	**Palacios**	Nabholz	—	7,868	11–5
17	April 26	@ Mets	0–2	Viola	**Smith**	Franco	30,702	11–6
18	April 27	@ Mets	10–1	**Tomlin**	Cone	—	32,062	12–6
19	April 28	@ Mets	7–3	**Smiley**	Darling	—	34,141	13–6
20	April 30	@ Reds	3–4	Browning	**Drabek**	Dibble	20,627	13–7

May (17–8)

#	Date	Opponent	Score	Win	Loss	Save	Attendance	Record
21	May 1	@ Reds	6–4	**Belinda**	Myers	**Landrum**	25,231	14–7
22	May 3	Astros	1–0	**Smith**	Harnisch	—	24,145	15–7
23	May 4	Astros	3–8	Jones	**Smiley**	Clancy	19,257	15–8
24	May 5	Astros	4–6	Portugal	**Drabek**	Schilling	17,727	15–9
25	May 6	Reds	3–1	**Palacios**	Rijo	**Landrum**	9,518	16–9
26	May 7	Reds	7–2	**Tomlin**	Hammond	**Belinda**	14,258	17–9
27	May 8	Reds	7–2	**Smith**	Charlton	—	14,594	18–9
28	May 10	Braves	5–2	**Smiley**	Smoltz	**Belinda**	23,936	19–9
29	May 11	Braves	2–3	Leibrandt	**Drabek**	Mercker	33,914	19–10
30	May 12	Braves	1–6	Avery	**Palacios**	Berenguer	20,287	19–11
31	May 14	@ Astros	6–3	**Smith**	Harnisch	—	7,846	20–11
32	May 15	@ Astros	8–7	**Kipper**	Schilling	**Landrum**	9,577	21–11
33	May 16	@ Astros	6–4	**Drabek**	Clancy	**Belinda**	8,419	22–11
34	May 17	@ Braves	3–9	Avery	**Palacios**	—	32,824	22–12
35	May 19	@ Braves	1–7	Glavine	**Smith**	Berenguer	27,164	22–13
36	May 21	Cardinals	5–3	**Smiley**	Moyer	**Landrum**	9,226	23–13
37	May 22	Cardinals	3–5	Carpenter	**Drabek**	Smith	19,630	23–14
38	May 23	Cardinals	2–8	DeLeon	**Tomlin**	Terry	8,557	23–15
39	May 24	Phillies	9–1	**Smith**	Mulholland	—	29,770	24–15
40	May 25	Phillies	4–2 (11)	**Palacios**	Boever	—	24,358	25–15
41	May 26	Phillies	5–2	**Smiley**	Grimsley	**Landrum**	26,117	26–15
42	May 27	@ Cardinals	8–0	**Drabek**	Tewksbury	—	40,667	27–15
43	May 28	@ Cardinals	9–8	**Belinda**	DeLeon	**Landrum**	22,766	28–15
44	May 29	@ Cardinals	6–0	**Smith**	Smith	—	27,178	29–15
45	May 31	@ Phillies	5–1	**Walk**	Grimsley	—	25,652	30–15

June (15–12)

#	Date	Opponent	Score	Win	Loss	Save	Attendance	Record
46	June 1	@ Phillies	5–3	**Smiley**	Combs	**Landrum**	31,601	31–15
47	June 2	@ Phillies	5–3	**Walk**	Williams	**Patterson**	36,185	32–15
48	June 4	Giants	3–5	Burkett	**Smith**	Righetti	19,460	32–16
49	June 5	Giants	7–3	**Walk**	Downs	—	15,461	33–16
50	June 6	Giants	3–6	Black	**Smiley**	Righetti	23,662	33–17
51	June 7	Padres	1–0	**Drabek**	Hurst	**Landrum**	25,095	34–17
52	June 8	Padres	0–11	Maddux	**Tomlin**	—	51,292	34–18
53	June 9	Padres	3–5	Benes	**Smith**	Lefferts	33,278	34–19
54	June 10	Padres	5–3	**Palacios**	Rasmussen	**Landrum**	10,512	35–19
55	June 12	Dodgers	2–1	**Drabek**	Morgan	**Landrum**	21,898	36–19
56	June 13	Dodgers	2–3	Gott	**Tomlin**	Howell	26,377	36–20
57	June 14	@ Giants	2–3	Oliveras	**Smith**	Righetti	17,333	36–21
58	June 15	@ Giants	0–4	Remlinger	**Smiley**	—	31,807	36–22
59	June 16	@ Giants	4–3	**Walk**	Black	**Landrum**	27,634	37–22
60	June 17	@ Padres	3–2	**Drabek**	Hurst	**Palacios**	15,951	38–22
61	June 18	@ Padres	3–1	**Landrum**	Lefferts	—	14,697	39–22
62	June 19	@ Padres	5–6	Andersen	**Heaton**	—	27,272	39–23
63	June 20	@ Dodgers	2–3	Gross	**Smiley**	—	50,060	39–24
64	June 21	@ Dodgers	5–1	**Walk**	Ojeda	**Kipper**	44,085	40–24
65	June 22	@ Dodgers	1–4	Morgan	**Drabek**	—	42,891	40–25
66	June 23	@ Dodgers	0–2	Belcher	**Smith**	Crews	46,354	40–26
67	June 25	Cubs	1–5	Lancaster	**Smiley**	—	31,115	40–27
68	June 26	Cubs	7–6	**Walk**	Maddux	**Landrum**	41,389	41–27
69	June 27	Cubs	4–3	**Palacios**	Assenmacher	—	30,960	42–27
70	June 28	@ Expos	6–1	**Smith**	Haney	—	14,501	43–27
71	June 29	@ Expos	2–1	**Heaton**	Ruskin	**Landrum**	16,961	44–27
72	June 30	@ Expos	2–1	**Smiley**	Martinez	**Belinda**	22,920	45–27

July (15–12)

#	Date	Opponent	Score	Win	Loss	Save	Attendance	Record
73	July 1	@ Cubs	5–6 (13)	Scanlan	**Belinda**	—	32,633	45–28
74	July 2	@ Cubs	13–4	**Drabek**	Boskie	—	34,332	46–28
75	July 3	@ Cubs	11–7	**Smith**	Lancaster	—	33,432	47–28
76	July 4	@ Cubs	8–9 (11)	McElroy	**Landrum**	—	31,098	47–29
77	July 5	Expos	3–4	Martinez	**Smiley**	—	37,807	47–30
78	July 6	Expos	1–2	Gardner	**Walk**	Burke	34,182	47–31
79	July 7	Expos	6–1	**Drabek**	Boyd	**Belinda**	41,995	48–31
80	July 11	@ Reds	10–6	**Palacios**	Myers	—	35,159	49–31
81	July 12	@ Reds	7–2	**Drabek**	Armstrong	—	42,181	50–31
82	July 13	@ Reds	5–2	**Smiley**	Browning	**Kipper**	48,857	51–31
83	July 14	@ Reds	10–6	**Walk**	Gross	**Patterson**	42,573	52–31
84	July 15	Astros	8–0	**Tomlin**	Jones	—	21,642	53–31
85	July 16	Astros	6–4	**Smith**	Kile	**Belinda**	18,028	54–31
86	July 17	Astros	2–10	Jones	**Drabek**	Osuna	38,736	54–32
87	July 19	Reds	7–2	**Smiley**	Browning	—	38,318	55–32
88	July 20	Reds	2–3	Gross	**Walk**	Power	34,805	55–33
89	July 21	Reds	6–0	**Tomlin**	Hammond	—	34,717	56–33
90	July 22	Braves	3–7	Smoltz	**Smith**	—	20,549	56–34
91	July 23	Braves	12–3	**Drabek**	Leibrandt	—	21,664	57–34
92	July 24	Braves	7–4	**Smiley**	Glavine	**Belinda**	26,508	58–34
93	July 26	@ Astros	8–1	**Heaton**	Kile	—	26,185	59–34
94	July 27	@ Astros	11–5	**Tomlin**	Jones	—	24,447	60–34
95	July 28	@ Astros	7–9	Bowen	**Smith**	Clancy	20,754	60–35
96	July 29	@ Braves	5–7	Glavine	**Drabek**	Freeman	0	60–36
97	July 29	@ Braves	3–5	Mahler	**Smiley**	Mercker	32,292	60–37
98	July 30	@ Braves	3–10	Parrett	**Landrum**	Mercker	27,099	60–38
99	July 31	@ Braves	6–8	Smoltz	**Palacios**	Stanton	23,955	60–39

August (17–12)

#	Date	Opponent	Score	Win	Loss	Save	Attendance	Record
100	August 1	@ Cardinals	3–6	Olivares	**Tomlin**	Smith	28,276	60–40
101	August 2	@ Cardinals	3–4	McClure	**Belinda**	—	36,228	60–41
102	August 3	@ Cardinals	5–6 (10)	Smith	**Patterson**	—	40,627	60–42
103	August 4	@ Cardinals	2–1	**Smiley**	Hill	—	34,243	61–42
104	August 6	@ Mets	3–1	**Tomlin**	Fernandez	—	38,658	62–42
105	August 7	@ Mets	1–7	Gooden	**Smith**	—	41,542	62–43
106	August 8	@ Mets	3–4	Viola	**Drabek**	Franco	41,672	62–44
107	August 9	Cardinals	1–5	Smith	**Smiley**	—	38,136	62–45
108	August 10	Cardinals	11–5	**Heaton**	Hill	—	49,939	63–45
109	August 11	Cardinals	6–4	**Mason**	Tewksbury	**Landrum**	31,814	64–45
110	August 12	Cardinals	4–3 (11)	**Patterson**	Smith	—	26,328	65–45
111	August 13	Phillies	4–3	**Drabek**	Cox	**Belinda**	22,584	66–45
112	August 14	Phillies	5–3	**Smiley**	Greene	**Belinda**	42,501	67–45
113	August 15	Phillies	4–6	de Jesus	**Heaton**	Williams	28,193	67–46
114	August 16	Mets	8–2	**Tomlin**	Fernandez	—	39,275	68–46
115	August 17	Mets	4–1	**Smith**	Gooden	**Belinda**	44,707	69–46
116	August 18	Mets	9–2	**Drabek**	Viola	—	36,014	70–46
117	August 20	@ Phillies	5–6	Searcy	**Belinda**	—	23,336	70–47
118	August 21	@ Phillies	5–6	Williams	**Kipper**	—	35,591	70–48
119	August 22	@ Phillies	3–4 (11)	Williams	**Landrum**	—	41,544	70–49
120	August 23	Giants	8–0	**Drabek**	Burkett	—	32,419	71–49
121	August 24	Giants	1–5	Wilson	**Heaton**	—	33,035	71–50
122	August 25	Giants	8–3	**Smiley**	Oliveras	**Belinda**	30,453	72–50
123	August 26	Padres	5–7 (10)	Lefferts	**Landrum**	—	27,396	72–51
124	August 27	Padres	5–2	**Smith**	Bones	**Mason**	19,227	73–51
125	August 28	@ Dodgers	6–4	**Rodriguez**	McDowell	**Belinda**	39,040	74–51
126	August 29	@ Dodgers	4–1	**Mason**	Morgan	**Landrum**	46,414	75–51
127	August 30	@ Padres	4–1	**Smiley**	Rasmussen	**Rodriguez**	21,726	76–51
128	August 31	@ Padres	3–2 (12)	**Landrum**	Melendez	**Kipper**	16,170	77–51

September (18–11)

#	Date	Opponent	Score	Win	Loss	Save	Attendance	Record
129	September 1	@ Padres	4–7	Bones	**Smith**	Maddux	13,099	77–52
130	September 2	@ Giants	9–8	**Belinda**	Righetti	**Rodriguez**	16,971	78–52
131	September 3	@ Giants	5–3 (10)	**Patterson**	Oliveras	—	9,544	79–52
132	September 4	@ Giants	8–3	**Smiley**	Black	**Mason**	8,690	80–52
133	September 6	Dodgers	3–4	McDowell	**Belinda**	—	0	80–53
134	September 6	Dodgers	3–1	**Smith**	Gross	—	46,993	81–53
135	September 7	Dodgers	1–5	Ojeda	**Drabek**	Gott	37,416	81–54
136	September 8	Dodgers	1–5	Morgan	**Patterson**	—	31,563	81–55
137	September 9	@ Cubs	12–10	**Belinda**	Smith	**Rodriguez**	18,775	82–55
138	September 10	@ Cubs	2–6	Sutcliffe	**Tomlin**	Scanlan	29,299	82–56
139	September 11	@ Cardinals	3–1	**Smith**	Tewksbury	—	20,457	83–56
140	September 12	@ Cardinals	0–1	Hill	**Drabek**	Smith	21,412	83–57
141	September 13	@ Phillies	8–6	**Belinda**	Williams	**Rodriguez**	29,107	84–57
142	September 14	@ Phillies	5–3	**Smiley**	Ashby	**Palacios**	27,412	85–57
143	September 15	@ Phillies	3–8	Greene	**Tomlin**	Williams	35,560	85–58
144	September 16	Cubs	5–4	**Smith**	Castillo	**Mason**	16,149	86–58
145	September 17	Cubs	9–2	**Drabek**	Bielecki	—	18,152	87–58
146	September 18	Cardinals	6–5	**Mason**	Fraser	—	30,123	88–58
147	September 19	Cardinals	5–1	**Belinda**	Olivares	—	22,904	89–58
148	September 20	Phillies	3–8	Greene	**Tomlin**	—	22,691	89–59
149	September 21	Phillies	7–0	**Smith**	de Jesus	—	27,162	90–59
150	September 22	Phillies	2–1	**Drabek**	Brantley	—	33,662	91–59
151	September 24	@ Mets	10–8	**Patterson**	Innis	**Rodriguez**	12,336	92–59
152	September 26	@ Mets	4–3 (15)	**Landrum**	Whitehurst	—	0	93–59
153	September 26	@ Mets	1–2	Burke	**Mason**	Franco	14,451	93–60
154	September 27	Expos	8–12	Ruskin	**Rodriguez**	—	8,201	93–61
155	September 28	Expos	2–3	Nabholz	**Drabek**	Rojas	17,122	93–62
156	September 29	Expos	6–3	**Walk**	Sampen	**Kipper**	14,798	94–62
157	September 30	Mets	6–5	**Landrum**	Simons	**Rodriguez**	16,170	95–62

October (3–2)

#	Date	Opponent	Score	Win	Loss	Save	Attendance	Record
158	October 1	Mets	2–1	**Smiley**	Cone	**Belinda**	14,697	96–62
159	October 2	Mets	6–9 (11)	Franco	**Patterson**	—	13,328	96–63
160	October 4	Expos	1–3	Jones	**Mason**	Rojas	14,227	96–64
161	October 5	Expos	4–3	**Walk**	Fassero	**Belinda**	14,038	97–64
162	October 6	Expos	7–0	**Smiley**	Barnes	—	23,429	98–64

Legend: = Win = Loss
Bold = Pirates team member

=== Record vs. opponents ===
1991 National League record Sources:
Team	ATL	CHC	CIN	HOU	LAD	MON	NYM	PHI	PIT	SD	SF	STL
Atlanta	—	6–6	11–7	13–5	7–11	5–7	9–3	5–7	9–3	11–7	9–9	9–3
Chicago	6–6	—	4–8	9–3	2–10	10–7	11–6	8–10	7–11	4–8	6–6	10–8
Cincinnati	7–11	8–4	—	9–9	6–12	6–6	5–7	9–3	2–10	8–10	10–8	4–8
Houston	5–13	3–9	9–9	—	8–10	2–10	7–5	7–5	4–8	6–12	9–9	5–7
Los Angeles	11–7	10–2	12–6	10–8	—	5–7	7–5	7–5	7–5	10–8	8–10	6–6
Montreal	7–5	7–10	6–6	10–2	7–5	—	4–14	4–14	6–12	6–6	7–5	7–11
New York	3–9	6–11	7–5	5–7	5–7	14–4	—	11–7	6–12	7–5	6–6	7–11
Philadelphia	7-5	10–8	3–9	5–7	5–7	14–4	7–11	—	6–12	9–3	6–6	6–12
Pittsburgh	3–9	11–7	10–2	8–4	5–7	12–6	12–6	12–6	—	7–5	7–5	11–7
San Diego	7–11	8–4	10–8	12–6	8–10	6–6	5–7	3–9	5–7	—	11–7	9–3
San Francisco	9–9	6–6	8–10	9–9	10–8	5–7	6–6	6–6	5–7	7–11	—	4–8
St. Louis	3–9	8–10	8–4	7–5	6–6	11–7	11–7	12–6	7–11	3–9	8–4	—

=== Detailed records ===
National League
Opponent	W	L	WP	RS	RA
NL East
Chicago Cubs	11	7	0.611	116	98
Montreal Expos	12	6	0.667	75	51
New York Mets	12	6	0.667	85	62
Philadelphia Phillies	12	6	0.667	87	66
**Pittsburgh Pirates**					
St. Louis Cardinals	11	7	0.611	82	66
Total	58	32	0.644	445	343
NL West
Atlanta Braves	3	9	0.250	51	71
Cincinnati Reds	10	2	0.833	73	34
Houston Astros	8	4	0.667	70	57
Los Angeles Dodgers	5	7	0.417	30	34
San Diego Padres	7	5	0.583	41	47
San Francisco Giants	7	5	0.583	58	46
Total	40	32	0.556	323	289
Season Total	98	64	0.605	768	632

Month	Games	Won	Lost	Win %	RS	RA
April	20	13	7	0.650	97	74
May	25	17	8	0.680	119	94
June	27	15	12	0.556	83	89
July	27	15	12	0.556	175	127
August	29	17	12	0.586	133	104
September	29	18	11	0.621	141	128
October	5	3	2	0.600	20	16
Total	162	98	64	0.605	768	632

	Games	Won	Lost	Win %	RS	RA
Home	84	52	32	0.619	382	314
Away	78	46	32	0.590	386	318
Total	162	98	64	0.605	768	632

== Roster ==
1991 Pittsburgh Pirates
Roster
Pitchers: 50 Stan Belinda; 15 Doug Drabek; 46 Héctor Fajardo; 26 Neal Heaton; 27 Mark Huismann; 16 Bob Kipper; 43 Bill Landrum; 48 Roger Mason; 64 Paul Miller; 58 Vicente Palacios; 38 Bob Patterson; 34 Rick Reed; 30 Rosario Rodríguez; 57 John Smiley; 41 Zane Smith; 29 Randy Tomlin; 17 Bob Walk	Catchers: 28 Jeff Banister; 12 Mike LaValliere; 14 Tom Prince; 11 Don Slaught; Infielders: 3 Jay Bell; 27 Steve Buechele; 51 Carlos García; 7 Jeff King; 13 José Lind; 28 Carmelo Martínez; 6 Orlando Merced; 36 Joe Redfield; 2 Gary Redus; 36 Jeff Richardson; 52 John Wehner; 19 Curtis Wilkerson	Outfielders: 24 Barry Bonds; 23 Bobby Bonilla; 47 Scott Bullett; 44 Cecil Espy; 5 José González; 22 Lloyd McClendon; 47 Jeff Schulz; 18 Andy Van Slyke; 42 Gary Varsho; 27 Mitch Webster	Manager: 10 Jim Leyland; Coaches: 45 Rich Donnelly (bullpen); 32 Gene Lamont (third base); 39 Milt May (hitting); 31 Ray Miller (pitching); 37 Tommy Sandt (first base)

=== Opening Day lineup ===
Opening Day Starters
#	Name	Position
2	Gary Redus	1B
3	Jay Bell	SS
18	Andy Van Slyke	CF
23	Bobby Bonilla	RF
24	Barry Bonds	LF
7	Jeff King	3B
12	Mike LaValliere	C
13	José Lind	2B
15	Doug Drabek	SP

== Awards and honors ==
1991 Major League Baseball All-Star Game

- Bobby Bonilla, DH, starter
- John Smiley, P, reserve

== Player stats ==
Batting

Note: G = Games played; AB = At bats; H = Hits; Avg. = Batting average; HR = Home runs; RBI = Runs batted in

Regular season
Player	G	AB	H	Avg.	HR	RBI
J. Banister	1	1	1	1.000	0	0
R. Reed	1	2	1	0.500	0	2
J. Wehner	37	106	36	0.340	0	7
B. Bonilla	157	577	174	0.302	18	100
D. Slaught	77	220	65	0.295	1	29
B. Bonds	153	510	149	0.292	25	116
M. LaValliere	108	336	97	0.289	3	41
L. McClendon	85	163	47	0.288	7	24
N. Heaton	44	14	4	0.286	0	1
O. Merced	120	411	113	0.275	10	50
G. Varsho	99	187	51	0.273	4	23
J. Bell	157	608	164	0.270	16	67
J. Lind	150	502	133	0.265	3	54
A. Van Slyke	138	491	130	0.265	17	83
T. Prince	26	34	9	0.265	1	2
C. García	12	24	6	0.250	0	1
C. Martínez	11	16	4	0.250	0	0
B. Patterson	54	4	1	0.250	0	0
J. Richardson	6	4	1	0.250	0	0
G. Redus	98	252	62	0.246	7	24
S. Buechele	31	114	28	0.246	4	19
C. Espy	43	82	20	0.244	1	11
J. King	33	109	26	0.239	4	18
B. Walk	25	39	8	0.205	1	5
R. Tomlin	32	52	10	0.192	0	2
C. Wilkerson	85	191	36	0.188	2	18
Z. Smith	36	71	13	0.183	0	10
D. Drabek	36	84	15	0.179	0	2
M. Webster	36	97	17	0.175	1	9
J. Redfield	11	18	2	0.111	0	0
J. González	16	20	2	0.100	1	3
J. Smiley	33	70	7	0.100	0	3
V. Palacios	36	14	1	0.071	0	0
S. Belinda	60	7	0	0.000	0	1
S. Bullett	11	4	0	0.000	0	0
H. Fajardo	2	3	0	0.000	0	0
B. Kipper	52	1	0	0.000	0	0
B. Landrum	61	4	0	0.000	0	0
P. Miller	1	3	0	0.000	0	0
R. Rodríguez	18	1	0	0.000	0	0
J. Schulz	3	3	0	0.000	0	0
M. Huismann	5	0	0	—	0	0
R. Mason	24	0	0	—	0	0
Team totals	162	5,449	1,433	0.263	126	725

Postseason
Player	G	AB	H	Avg.	HR	RBI
G. Varsho	2	2	1	0.500	0	0
J. Bell	7	29	12	0.414	1	1
M. LaValliere	3	6	2	0.333	0	1
B. Bonilla	7	23	7	0.304	0	1
S. Buechele	7	23	7	0.304	0	0
D. Slaught	6	17	4	0.235	0	1
O. Merced	3	9	2	0.222	1	1
D. Drabek	2	5	1	0.200	0	1
J. Lind	7	25	4	0.160	0	3
A. Van Slyke	7	25	4	0.160	1	2
G. Redus	5	19	3	0.158	0	0
B. Bonds	7	27	4	0.148	0	0
C. Espy	2	2	0	0.000	0	0
R. Mason	3	1	0	0.000	0	0
L. McClendon	3	2	0	0.000	0	0
Z. Smith	2	5	0	0.000	0	0
R. Tomlin	1	2	0	0.000	0	0
B. Walk	3	2	0	0.000	0	0
C. Wilkerson	4	4	0	0.000	0	0
S. Belinda	3	0	0	—	0	0
B. Kipper	1	0	0	—	0	0
B. Landrum	1	0	0	—	0	0
B. Patterson	1	0	0	—	0	0
R. Rodríguez	1	0	0	—	0	0
J. Smiley	2	0	0	—	0	0
Team totals	7	228	51	0.224	3	11

Pitching

Note: G = Games pitched; IP = Innings pitched; W = Wins; L = Losses; ERA = Earned run average; SO = Strikeouts

Regular season
Player	G	IP	W	L	ERA	SO
R. Tomlin	31	175	8	7	2.98	104
R. Mason	24	29 2/3	3	2	3.03	21
D. Drabek	35	234 2/3	15	14	3.07	142
J. Smiley	33	207 2/3	20	8	3.08	129
B. Landrum	61	76 1/3	4	4	3.18	45
Z. Smith	35	228	16	10	3.20	120
S. Belinda	60	78 1/3	7	5	3.45	71
B. Walk	25	115	9	2	3.60	67
V. Palacios	36	81 2/3	6	3	3.75	64
R. Rodríguez	18	15 1/3	1	1	4.11	10
B. Patterson	54	65 2/3	4	3	4.11	57
N. Heaton	42	68 2/3	3	3	4.33	34
B. Kipper	52	60	2	2	4.65	38
P. Miller	1	5	0	0	5.40	2
M. Huismann	5	5	0	0	7.20	5
H. Fajardo	2	6 1/3	0	0	9.95	8
R. Reed	1	4 1/3	0	0	10.38	2
Team totals	162	1456 2/3	98	64	3.44	919

Postseason
Player	G	IP	W	L	ERA	SO
S. Belinda	3	5	1	0	0.00	4
R. Mason	3	4 1/3	0	0	0.00	2
B. Patterson	1	2	0	0	0.00	3
D. Drabek	2	15	1	1	0.60	10
Z. Smith	2	14 2/3	1	1	0.61	10
B. Walk	3	9 1/3	0	0	1.93	5
R. Tomlin	1	6	0	0	3.00	1
B. Kipper	1	2	0	0	4.50	1
B. Landrum	1	1	0	0	9.00	2
J. Smiley	2	2 2/3	0	2	23.63	3
R. Rodríguez	1	1	0	0	27.00	1
Team totals	7	63	3	4	2.57	42

== National League Championship Series ==
Game 1

October 9: Three Rivers Stadium in Pittsburgh, Pennsylvania

Team	1	2	3	4	5	6	7	8	9	R	H	E
Atlanta	0	0	0	0	0	0	0	0	1	1	5	1
Pittsburgh	1	0	2	0	0	1	0	1	X	5	8	1
W: Doug Drabek (1-0) L: Tom Glavine (0-1) S: Bob Walk (1)
HR: ATL – David Justice (1) PIT – Andy Van Slyke (1)
Pitchers: ATL – Glavine (6), Wohlers (1), Stanton (1) PIT – Drabek (6), Walk (3)
Attendance: 57,347 Time: 2:51

Game 2

October 10: Three Rivers Stadium in Pittsburgh, Pennsylvania

Team	1	2	3	4	5	6	7	8	9	R	H	E
Atlanta	0	0	0	0	0	1	0	0	0	1	8	0
Pittsburgh	0	0	0	0	0	0	0	0	0	0	6	0
W: Steve Avery (1-0) L: Zane Smith (0-1) S: Alejandro Peña (1)
HR: ATL – None PIT – None
Pitchers: ATL – Avery (8 1/3), Pena (2/3) PIT – Z. Smith (7), Mason (1), Belinda (1)
Attendance: 57,533 Time: 2:46

Game 3

October 12: Atlanta–Fulton County Stadium in Atlanta

Team	1	2	3	4	5	6	7	8	9	R	H	E
Pittsburgh	1	0	0	1	0	0	1	0	0	3	10	2
Atlanta	4	1	1	0	0	0	1	3	X	10	11	0
W: John Smoltz (1-0) L: John Smiley (0-1) S: Alejandro Peña (2)
HR: PIT – None ATL – Greg Olson (1), Ron Gant (1), Sid Bream (1)
Pitchers: PIT – Smiley (2), Landrum (1), Patterson (2), Kipper (2), Rodriguez (1) ATL – Smoltz (6 1/3), Stanton (2/3), Wohlers (1/3), Pena (1 2/3)
Attendance: 50,905 Time: 3:21

Game 4

October 13: Atlanta–Fulton County Stadium in Atlanta

Team	1	2	3	4	5	6	7	8	9	10	R	H	E
Pittsburgh	0	1	0	0	1	0	0	0	0	1	3	11	1
Atlanta	2	0	0	0	0	0	0	0	0	0	2	7	1
W: Stan Belinda (1-0) L: Kent Mercker (0-1) S: None
HR: PIT – None ATL – None
Pitchers: PIT – Tomlin (6), Walk (2), Belinda (2) ATL – Leibrant (6 2/3), Clancy (1/3), Stanton (2), Mercker (2/3), Wohlers (1/3)
Attendance: 51,109 Time: 3:43

Game 5

October 14: Atlanta–Fulton County Stadium in Atlanta

Team	1	2	3	4	5	6	7	8	9	R	H	E
Pittsburgh	0	0	0	0	1	0	0	0	0	1	6	2
Atlanta	0	0	0	0	0	0	0	0	0	0	9	1
W: Zane Smith (1-1) L: Tom Glavine (0-2) S: Roger Mason (1)
HR: PIT – None ATL – None
Pitchers: PIT – Z. Smith (7 2/3), Mason (1 1/3) ATL – Glavine (8), Pena (1)
Attendance: 51,109 Time: 2:51

Game 6

October 16: Three Rivers Stadium in Pittsburgh, Pennsylvania

Team	1	2	3	4	5	6	7	8	9	R	H	E
Atlanta	0	0	0	0	0	0	0	0	1	1	7	0
Pittsburgh	0	0	0	0	0	0	0	0	0	0	4	0
W: Steve Avery (2-0) L: Doug Drabek (1-1) S: Alejandro Peña (3)
HR: ATL – None PIT – None
Pitchers: ATL – Avery (8), Pena (1) PIT – Drabek (9)
Attendance: 54,508 Time: 3:09

Game 7

October 17: Three Rivers Stadium in Pittsburgh, Pennsylvania

Team	1	2	3	4	5	6	7	8	9	R	H	E
Atlanta	3	0	0	0	1	0	0	0	0	4	6	1
Pittsburgh	0	0	0	0	0	0	0	0	0	0	6	0
W: John Smoltz (2-0) L: John Smiley (0-2) S: None
HR: ATL – Brian Hunter (1) PIT – None
Pitchers: ATL – Smoltz (9) PIT – Smiley (2/3), Walk (4 1/3), Mason (2), Belinda (2)
Attendance: 46,932 Time: 3:04

== Transactions ==
- May 16, 1991: Mike York was traded by the Pirates to the Cleveland Indians for Mitch Webster.
- June 11, 1991: Mark Huismann was released by the Pirates.

== Farm system ==
Level	Team	League	Manager
AAA	Buffalo Bisons	American Association	Terry Collins
AA	Carolina Mudcats	Southern League	Marc Bombard
A	Salem Buccaneers	Carolina League	Stan Cliburn
A	Augusta Pirates	South Atlantic League	Don Werner
A-Short Season	Welland Pirates	New York–Penn League	Lee Driggers
Rookie	GCL Pirates	Gulf Coast League	Woody Huyke
