= Kurt Miller =

American baseball player (born 1972)

- Pitcher
- Born: August 24, 1972 (age 54); Tucson, Arizona, U.S.
- Batted: Right Threw: Right

MLB debut
- June 11, 1994, for the Florida Marlins

Last MLB appearance
- April 27, 1999, for the Chicago Cubs

MLB statistics
- Win–loss record: 2–7
- Earned run average: 7.48
- Strikeouts: 55
- Stats at Baseball Reference

Teams
- Florida Marlins (1994, 1996–1997); Chicago Cubs (1998–1999); Hanshin Tigers (1999–2000)

Kurt Everett Miller (born August 24, 1972) is an American former professional baseball pitcher. He played parts of five seasons in Major League Baseball (MLB), between 1994 and 1999, for the Chicago Cubs and Florida Marlins. He also played in two seasons in Nippon Professional Baseball (NPB), in 1999 and 2000, for the Hanshin Tigers.

== Early career ==
Miller was drafted by the Pittsburgh Pirates out of West High School in Bakersfield, California, with the 5th overall pick in the 1990 MLB draft. A little over a year later, he was traded to the Texas Rangers with fellow pitching prospect Héctor Fajardo for third baseman Steve Buechele. He spent nearly two seasons in the Rangers organization before being traded again, this time to the expansion Marlins, again with another pitching prospect, this time Robb Nen, for pitcher Cris Carpenter.

== Marlins ==
Miller finished the 1993 season with the Edmonton Trappers, the Marlins' Triple-A farm team. He began the 1994 season with Edmonton as well, but was called up to the major leagues in June to replace the injured Mark Gardner in the starting rotation. He made his MLB debut at age 20 on June 11 against the team that had drafted him, the Pirates. He gave up 7 runs on 9 hits in just 4 innings pitched. He improved substantially in his next start, throwing 8.2 innings against the New York Mets and giving up just 4 hits. However, after two more bad starts he was returned to the minor leagues.

Miller's minor league numbers in 1994 were not impressive, either. He won 7 games and lost 13 while posting an ERA of 6.88. The next season, with the Marlins' new top farm club the Charlotte Knights, Miller's numbers improved to 8–11 with a 4.62 ERA.

Miller began the 1996 season back in Charlotte, but he was called up in early May. After pitching one game in relief, the first time he had appeared in the majors as a reliever and just his fifth professional relief appearance, he was moved back into the rotation to replace Chris Hammond. His first start was a good one, giving up just one run in eight innings against the Colorado Rockies, but after two less-successful starts he was sent back to the bullpen. He was subsequently returned to Charlotte in mid-July, where he returned to starting. He came back to the majors a month later, made two more starts, then spent September in the bullpen. In 26 major league games, Miller posted a record of 1–3 with an ERA of 6.80.

Miller spent most of 1997 in Charlotte, missing a chunk of the season due to an elbow injury. He returned to the Marlins to pitch 7 games in September, but gave up 8 runs in 7.1 innings. After the season, he was traded to the Cubs.

== Remaining career ==
Miller was assigned to the Triple-A Iowa Cubs to start the 1998 season, and he responded with his best season at that level, going 14–3 with a 3.81 ERA. He was brought up to the majors in late September, and pitched four scoreless innings over three games. He made the 1999 Cubs out of spring training, but pitched in just four games before suffering a ribcage injury. He came back to pitch in eight games in Iowa, and in June, he was allowed to go to Japan and sign with Hanshin.

Miller returned to starting with the Tigers, appearing in 11 games and posting a 2–4 record with a 5.98 ERA. The next season, the Tigers tried to use him as their closer, and he posted 6 saves in his first 17 games, but he also gave up 15 runs on 17 hits and 11 walks with a 7.41 ERA. He was released after the season.
