= Randy Ready =

American baseball player (born 1960)

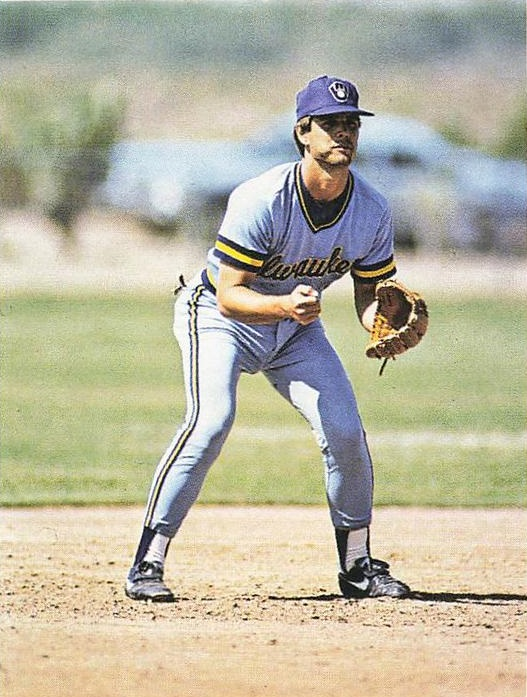
- Ready with the Milwaukee Brewers in 1983.
- Second baseman / Third baseman / Left fielder
- Born: January 8, 1960 (age 66); San Mateo, California, U.S.
- Batted: Right Threw: Right

Professional debut
- MLB: September 4, 1983, for the Milwaukee Brewers
- NPB: March 30, 1996, for the Chiba Lotte Marines

Last appearance
- MLB: July 9, 1995, for the Philadelphia Phillies
- NPB: May 31, 1996, for the Chiba Lotte Marines

MLB statistics
- Batting average: .259
- Home runs: 40
- Runs batted in: 239

NPB statistics
- Batting average: .200
- Home runs: 1
- Runs batted in: 11
- Stats at Baseball Reference

Teams
- Milwaukee Brewers (1983–1986); San Diego Padres (1986–1989); Philadelphia Phillies (1989–1991); Oakland Athletics (1992); Montreal Expos (1993); Philadelphia Phillies (1994–1995); Chiba Lotte Marines (1996)

Randall Max Ready (born January 8, 1960) is an American former professional baseball player and manager. Ready played in Major League Baseball (MLB), primarily as a utility player, from 1983 to 1995. He also played one season in Japan for the Chiba Lotte Marines in 1996. He was later a minor-league manager for the Detroit Tigers and San Diego Padres.

== Playing career ==
Ready played in the Puerto Rican Winter League for the Indios de Mayagüez during 1985–86. In 1984, he was second in the race for the league's batting title. He batted .361, finishing behind Don Mattingly, who batted .368.

On June 12, 1986, Ready was traded by the Milwaukee Brewers to the San Diego Padres for a player to be named later. On October 29, 1986, the Padres sent Tim Pyznarski to the Brewers to complete the trade.

Only days after his trade to San Diego, Ready's wife Doreen suffered a heart attack that caused brain damage. At the time, the Readys had three children. Four years later, Ready was awarded $24.7 million by a jury that ruled a physician who had prescribed diet pills to Doreen Ready was responsible for the heart attack she had suffered.

On June 2, 1989, Ready was traded with John Kruk from the Padres to the Philadelphia Phillies for Chris James.

On April 28, 1991, Ready nearly executed a rare unassisted triple play. In the first inning of a Phillies game hosting the Padres, Ready caught a line drive hit by Tony Gwynn, stepped on second to force out Paul Faries, and could have easily tagged out Tony Fernández, but threw the ball to first baseman Ricky Jordan for the third and final out. It was the Phillies' first triple play in the history of Veterans Stadium. Years later, Ready reflected, "I wish I had tagged Tony Fernandez. I never realized how close he was to me."

=== Career statistics ===
In 777 games over 13 major-league seasons, Ready posted a .259 batting average (547-for-2110) with 312 runs, 107 doubles, 21 triples, 40 home runs, 239 RBI, 326 bases on balls, a .359 on-base percentage, and a .387 slugging percentage. He finished his career with a .966 fielding percentage playing at first, second and third base and left and right field.

== Managing career ==
Ready returned to baseball as a manager for the Oneonta Tigers in 2002–2003, where he was named the New York–Penn League Manager of the Year after leading the Tigers to a 47–27 (.635) record and a division title 2002. Ready returned to the San Diego Padres minor league system and served as manager of the Fort Wayne Wizards (Class A, Fort Wayne, Indiana) from 2004 until 2006. In 2007, Ready was named the manager of the San Antonio Missions (Class AA, San Antonio, Texas) for their inaugural season with the San Diego Padres organization. He led the team to a 73–66 (.525) record and the Texas League championship. On December 14, 2007, Ready was named the manager of the Portland Beavers (Class AAA, Portland, Oregon), a position he held until being named the hitting coach of the San Diego Padres on July 31, 2009. Following the 2009 season, Ready was a candidate to be the next manager of the Houston Astros, however, the position was filled by Brad Mills.

The Padres finished the 2011 season with a 71–91 record while hitting a major league-low 91 home runs and finishing last in the National League (and next to last in MLB) in batting average (.237) and OPS (.653). They scored the third fewest runs in MLB, and they were shut out 19 times. Ready was fired by the Padres after the end of the season.

In 2012, he was the Texas Rangers' minor league hitting coordinator.

On November 12, 2012, Ready was hired to be the next manager for the Atlanta Braves' Triple-A affiliate, Gwinnett. He was replaced by Brian Snitker on October 14, 2013.

On January 8, 2016, Ready was hired to be the next manager for the Miami Marlins' Single-A affiliate, Jupiter Hammerheads.

Ready was named as the manager for the Jacksonville Jumbo Shrimp in the Miami Marlins organization for the 2018 season. In 2019, he was replaced by Kevin Randel.
