= Kevin P. Coughlin =

American photographer

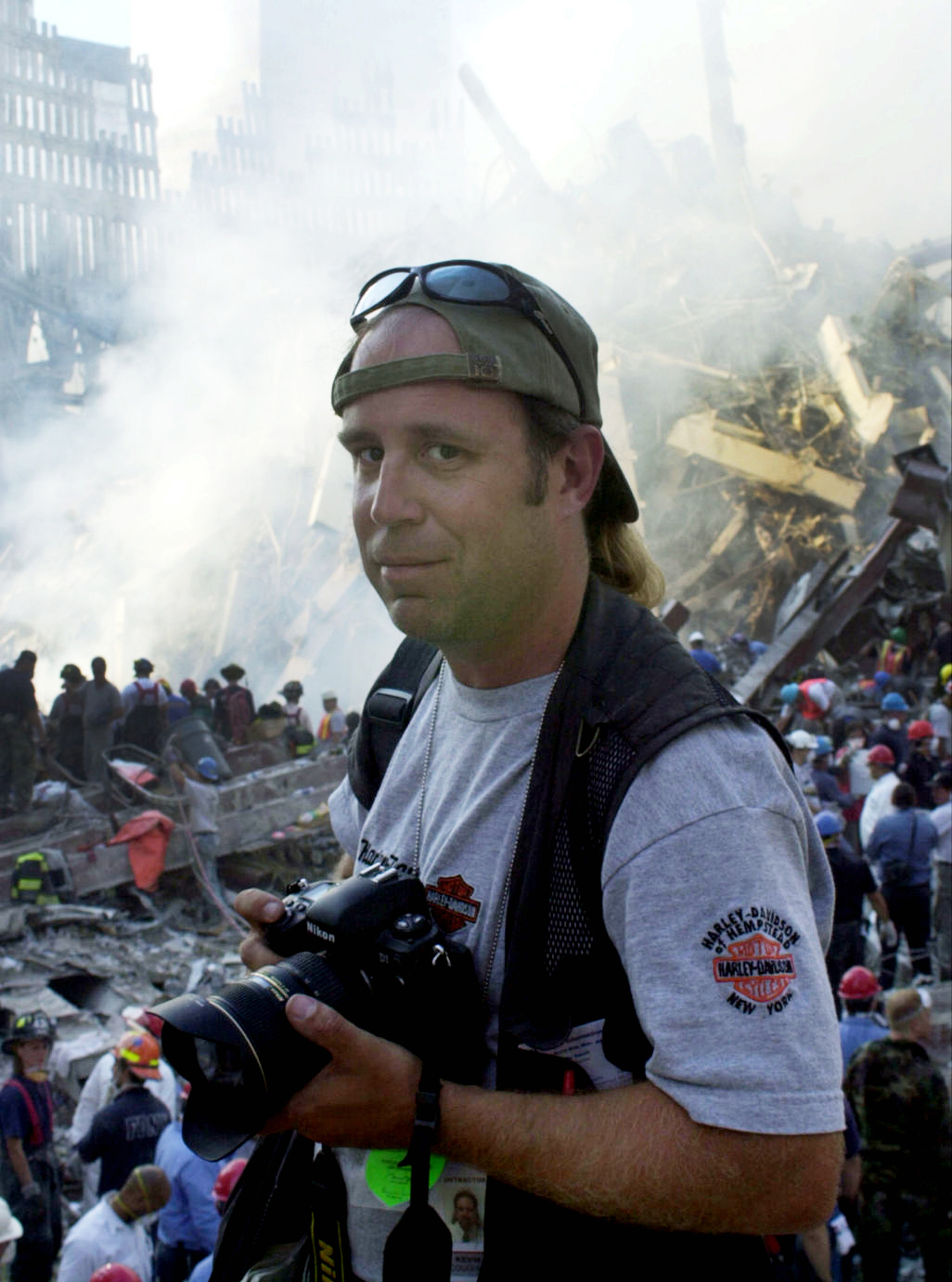
Coughlin at Ground Zero

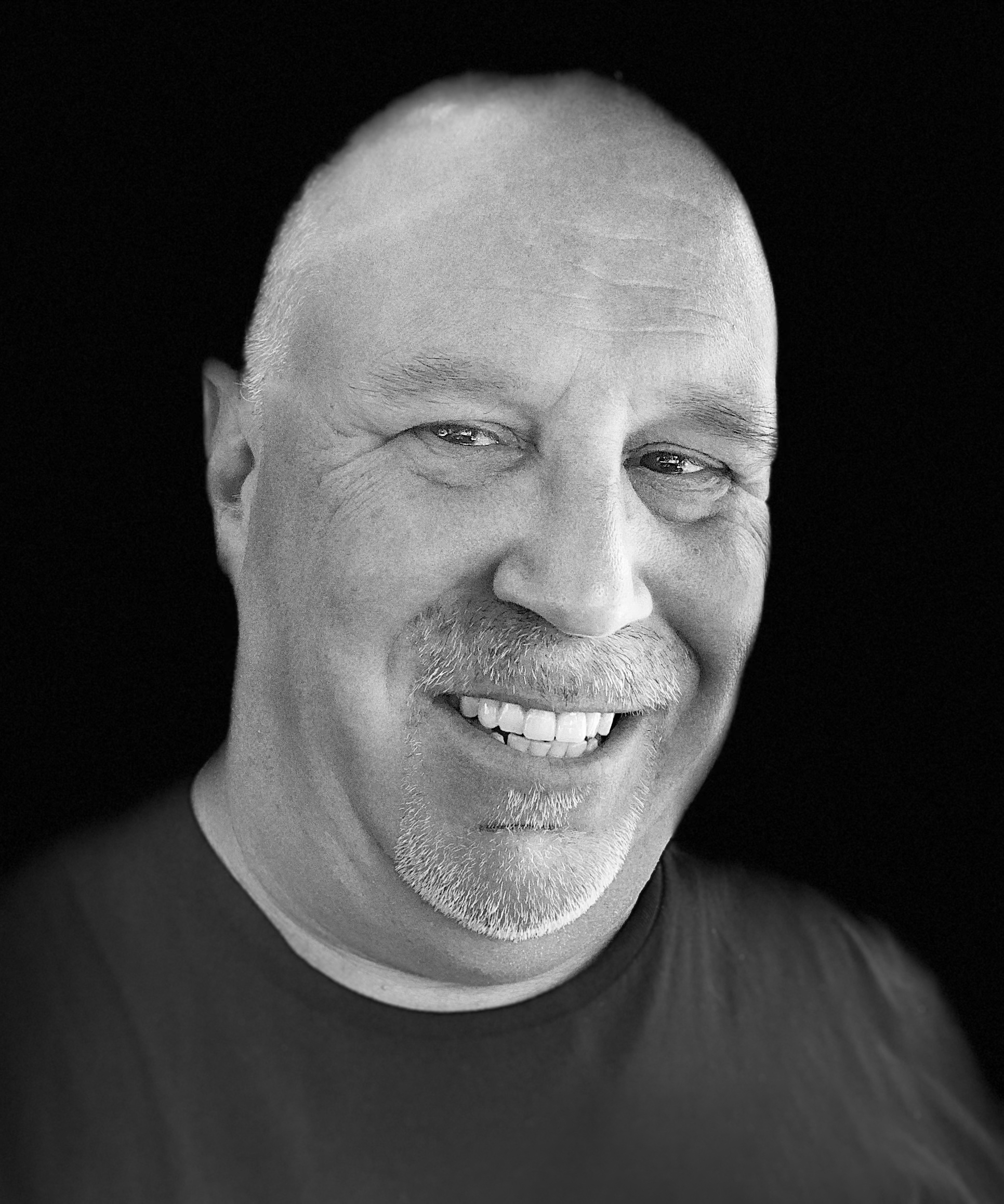
Self portrait of Coughlin, 2019

Kevin P. Coughlin is a photojournalist, senior technical photographer, aerial cinematographer, public affairs officer and pilot. He is the former executive photographer to New York Governors Kathy Hochul and Andrew M. Cuomo. His photographs at Ground Zero following the September 11, 2001 attacks on the World Trade Center and while covering funerals and memorial services of fallen fire fighters, police officers, and emergency personnel killed as a result of the attacks are included in the 2002 Pulitzer Prize awarded to The New York Times for Public Service. In addition to The New York Times, his photographs have appeared in the New York Post, New York Daily News, Newsday, The Philadelphia Inquirer, The Los Angeles Times, Bloomberg News, Business Week, People, Sports Illustrated, Rolling Stone, Time, USA Today and The Wall Street Journal. He has also written magazine articles for GQ and News Photographer.

== Early life ==
Coughlin grew up in the Long Island, New York suburb of Farmingdale. He attended St. John's University in Jamaica, Queens, NY where he studied photography, journalism and mass communications. Coughlin also served as a staff photographer and photo editor of St. John's student newspaper, The Torch While a student at St. John's, he interned as a photographer for Newsday in Melville, New York. After graduation, he worked as a freelance photographer for Newsday, the Associated Press, United Press International, and for The National Sports Daily under legendary sports photographer Neil Leifer. On August 15, 1991, Coughlin persuaded an HBO camera crew to allow him in a cherry picker for an aerial shot of an estimated crowd of 750,000 people attending a free concert by Paul Simon in New York's Central Park. Simon saw the photograph a week later in Newsweek and contacted Coughlin to use the image for his album and video release: Paul Simon's Concert in the Park, August 15, 1991.

== Career ==
Coughlin began his career in the 1980s as an intern for rock music photographer Mark Weiss ("Weissguy"), and went on to photograph the likes of Aerosmith, Bruce Springsteen, Paul McCartney, Black Sabbath, Guns N' Roses, Metallica, Ozzy Osbourne, AC/DC, and five concert tours with The Rolling Stones. As a working photojournalist, Coughlin's first staff photographer job was with the Asbury Park Press in Neptune, New Jersey. In a course of two years, he earned a staff photographer position with New Jersey's largest newspaper, The Star-Ledger of Newark. His last assignment with the Star-Ledger was covering Woodstock '94 in Saugerties, New York. Shortly afterwards, he returned to New York City as a freelancer.

In the late 1990s, Coughlin made the transition from 35mm film to Digital Single Lens Reflex (DSLR)cameras, one of the first independent photojournalists to do so, and began freelancing for The New York Times. In 2002, he was honored for his visual contributions to The New York Times' Pulitzer Prize–winning series: "A Nation Challenged". His work later appeared in two Times-published books: PORTRAITS 9/11/01 and A Nation Challenged: A Visual History of 9/11 and its Aftermath. The New York Times won the 2002 Pulitzer Prizes in the Breaking News Photography, Feature Photography and Public Service categories. Coughlin was a team member for the latter grouping.

As the 2000s progressed, Coughlin joined the New York Post as a sports photographer and photo editor. He covered mostly professional sporting events and led the Post's coverage for Super Bowl XLII in 2009 and the World Series, also in 2009. He also worked on personal projects, such as traveling to Vatican City to cover the funeral of Pope John Paul II in 2005. In 2008, he covered the Papal Visit to New York City by Pope Benedict XVI and was an on-field pool photographer for a Papal Mass held at the original Yankee Stadium on April 20, 2008.

Come July 2008 Coughlin left the New York Post to become the Director of Photography for former New York Mets and Philadelphia Phillies all-star Lenny Dykstra's financial magazine for professional athletes, The Players Club, but that did not last long. After only 67 days Coughlin left The Players Club citing Dykstra's unusual and abusive idiosyncrasies. Coughlin stated that Dykstra, who lived in California, would often call at unusual hours, such as 2 am to 3 am EST, and expect Coughlin to wake up and "go to work" at that hour. These and many other unusual experiences were documented in an article for the April 2009 issue of GQ magazine titled You Think Your Job Sucks? Try Working For Lenny Dykstra In 2009, Coughlin appeared as a guest on the HBO program Real Sports with Bryant Gumbel, following up on Lenny Dysktra's questionable business practices.

Coughlin always had an interest in aviation, and in particular, aerial photography. In 2009 he bought an airplane and obtained his Private Pilot License. He claims his flight training was subsidized by aerial photography assignments. In addition to flying and taking photos from manned aircraft, Coughlin is considered a prominent authority on the use of unmanned aerial vehicles for aerial photography and aerial cinematography. While working in the New York Governors office he became the first Chief sUAS Pilot for the State of New York.

On October 8, 2022, Coughlin was awarded a New York Emmy Award as an aerial videographer for his contribution to the Newsday online documentary: On the Shoulders of Giants. In this documentary, Newsday chronicled the murder of George Floyd, an African-American man, and the 8 minutes 46 seconds that a white Minneapolis police officer spent kneeling on his neck. Floyd's murder set off a firestorm of protest and a cry for social justice on Long Island, NY and across the nation.

He currently works as a senior technical photographer, videographer, and sUAS pilot at Brookhaven National Laboratory under the United States Department of Energy.
