= Héctor Fajardo =

Mexican baseball player (born 1970)

- Pitcher
- Born: November 16, 1970 (age 55); Sahuayo, Michoacán, Mexico
- Batted: Right Threw: Right

MLB debut
- August 10, 1991, for the Pittsburgh Pirates

Last MLB appearance
- June 18, 1995, for the Texas Rangers

MLB statistics
- Win–loss record: 5–9
- Earned run average: 6.95
- Strikeouts: 78
- Stats at Baseball Reference

Teams
- Pittsburgh Pirates (1991); Texas Rangers (1991, 1993–1995)

Héctor Fajardo Navarrete (born November 16, 1970) is a Mexican former professional baseball pitcher. He played in Major League Baseball (MLB) for the Pittsburgh Pirates and Texas Rangers in a career that spanned four years, from 1991 to 1995.

== Baseball career ==
=== Minor leagues ===
Fajardo was purchased by the Pittsburgh Pirates from the Mexico City Red Devils on April 2, 1989. He played that season with the Gulf Coast League Pirates. Over the next two seasons, he worked his way through the Pirates organization. Fajardo was nicknamed "Senor Lluvia" or "Mr. Rain" because of how many of the games he was expected to start were rained out.

=== 1991 season ===
Fajardo had surgery in the off-season to remove bone chips from his arm and his fastball improved significantly, from 85 mph to 93-95 mph. As his fastball and forkball were his main pitches, this marked a key transition. He also threw a curveball and changeup. He pitched at almost every level of the Pirates farm system, leading the club's minor leaguers with 151 strikeouts overall. In a minor-league game in 1991, he broke 9 of opponents bats while pitching.

Fajardo played his first games in the major leagues with the Pirates, making his major league debut on August 10. He was traded by the Pirates to the Texas Rangers on September 6, 1991, completing a trade in which Pittsburgh Pirates traded Kurt Miller and a player to be named later to Texas Rangers for Steve Buechele. He appeared in 6 games that season, being the starting pitcher in 5 of those games, recording a 9.95 ERA with Pittsburgh, and a 5.68 ERA with Texas. In total, he struck out 23 batters with 9 earned runs in 25.1 innings pitched.

=== 1992 season ===
Héctor Fajardo did not play in the major leagues in 1992, spending the entire season in the minor leagues, and was limited with injuries throughout the year, spending time with the Oklahoma City 89ers, Tulsa Drillers (2-1, 2.16), Charlotte Rangers and GCL Rangers for a total of 11 games.

=== 1993 season ===
Fajardo continued to be plagued by injuries in the '93 season, pitching only 2/3 of an inning with the Rangers. He pitched in two games for Charlotte and recorded six starts for the GCL Rangers.

=== 1994 season ===
1994, his official rookie season, was the year Fajardo finally got a real audition with the Rangers, pitching in the rotation for 3 months, pitching 5–7 with a 6.91 ERA in 18 appearances and 83.1 innings pitched and recording 45 strikeouts. After his time in MLB, he was demoted to the Oklahoma City 89ers, where he was 5–1 with a 2.45 ERA.

=== 1995 season ===
Like 1991–1993, Fajardo had few appearances in the majors, pitching only 15 innings, and recording a 7.80 ERA. He was traded to the Expos for Lou Frazier. He didn't play with the Expos, and was instantly demoted to the Ottawa Lynx, where he had 11 relief appearance, not recording any decisions, and a 4.11 ERA.

=== Back to the Mexican League ===
In 1996, Fajardo returned to the Mexican League. He played there until 1998.
