= Lenny Dykstra =

American baseball player (born 1963)

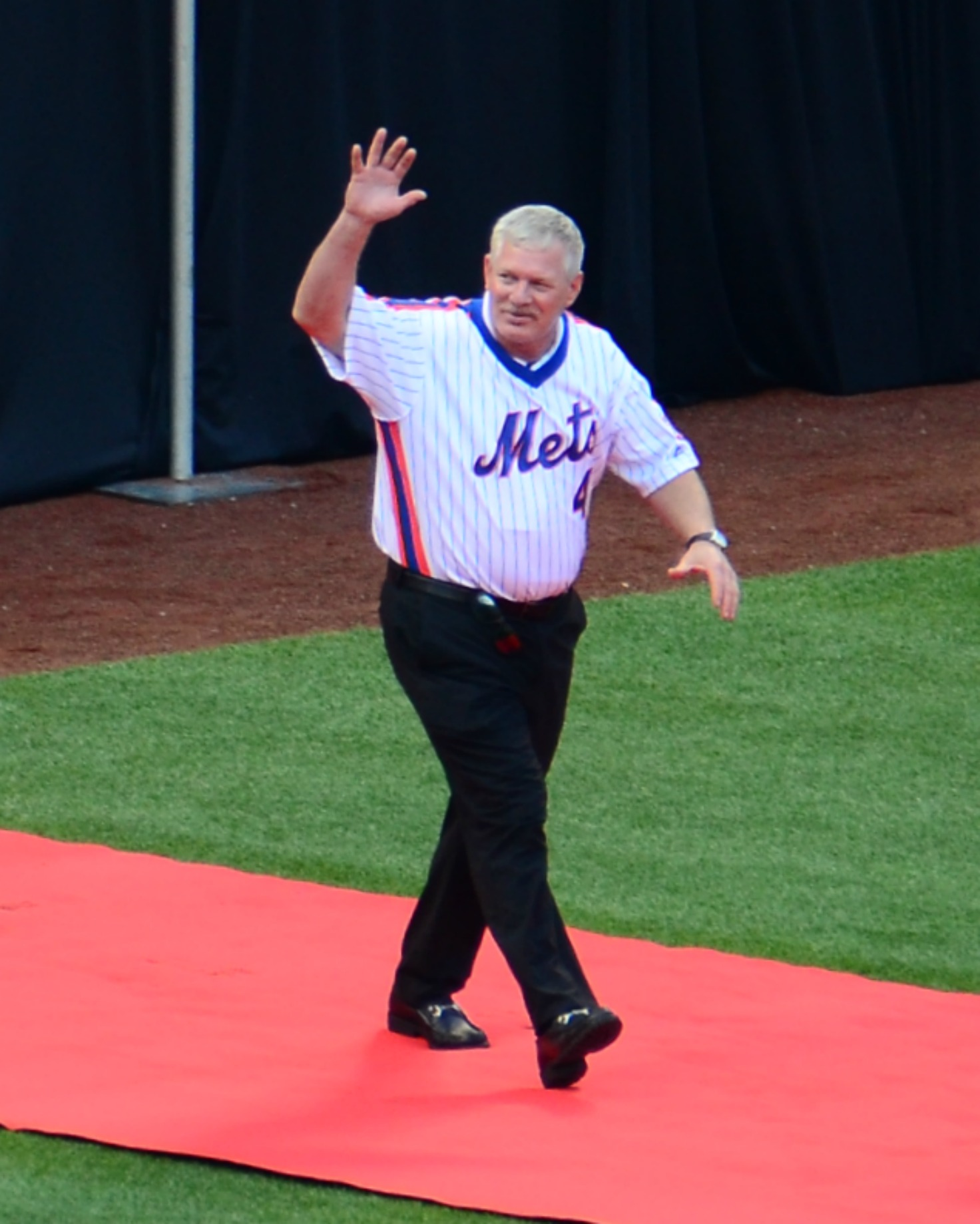
- Dykstra in 2016
- Center fielder
- Born: February 10, 1963 (age 63); Santa Ana, California, U.S.
- Batted: Left Threw: Left

MLB debut
- May 3, 1985, for the New York Mets

Last MLB appearance
- May 18, 1996, for the Philadelphia Phillies

MLB statistics
- Batting average: .285
- Home runs: 81
- Runs batted in: 404
- Stats at Baseball Reference

Teams
- New York Mets (1985–1989); Philadelphia Phillies (1989–1996)

Career highlights and awards
- 3× All-Star (1990, 1994, 1995); World Series champion (1986); Silver Slugger Award (1993)

Leonard Kyle Dykstra (/ˈdaɪkstrə/ DYK-strə; born February 10, 1963), nicknamed Nails and Dude, is an American former professional baseball center fielder who played in Major League Baseball (MLB) for the New York Mets (1985–1989) and Philadelphia Phillies (1989–1996). Dykstra was a three-time All-Star and won a World Series championship as a member of the 1986 Mets.

Since his retirement, Dykstra has been mired in financial and legal troubles. In 2009, he filed for bankruptcy. Since then, he has been charged with and convicted of various crimes, including bankruptcy fraud, money laundering, grand theft auto, uttering terroristic threats, drug possession, and indecent exposure. Dykstra has served 6 1/2 months in federal prison.

== Early life and family ==
Lenny Dykstra was born Leonard Kyle Leswick on February 10, 1963, in Santa Ana, California. Dykstra's father, Terry Leswick, abandoned the family when Dykstra was four years of age. Dykstra's mother, Marilyn, later married Dennis Dykstra, a phone company employee. Dennis Dykstra adopted Lenny. Lenny Dykstra has two brothers: Brian and Kevin.

Dykstra's uncles, Pete, Jack, and Tony Leswick, played in the National Hockey League.

Dykstra attended Garden Grove High School in Orange County, California. During his senior year, he hit .494 with 50 hits on the season, which was just two short of the state record. He had a career total of 89 stolen bases, second best in state history at the time, and recorded a hit in all 27 games of his senior season. In both his junior and senior seasons he was named all-league, all-county, and all-state. He was named 3-A co-player of the year in 1981. In the Orange County All-Star baseball game he reached base all eight times he came to bat, earning five hits, a walk, and reaching base on two errors, and stole five bases. He also played football, where he was named 2nd team all-county and team MVP as a defensive back.

== Baseball career ==
=== New York Mets ===
Dykstra was originally committed to play baseball at Arizona State University for Jim Brock but said he would sign to play professionally if drafted high enough. The Mets signed Dykstra as a 13th-round draft pick in 1981. A star in the minors, in 1983 he led the Carolina League in at-bats, runs, hits, triples, batting average and stolen bases. That season, he hit .358 with 8 HR, 81 RBI, 105 stolen bases (a league record for 17 years), 107 walks and only 35 strikeouts. He was subsequently named the Carolina League MVP, and soon emerged as one of the Mets' prized prospects. While playing in Double-A in 1984 he befriended fellow outfielder and teammate Billy Beane, who later said that Dykstra was "perfectly designed, emotionally" to play baseball and that he had "no concept of failure." According to Beane, his first comments on seeing future Hall of Fame pitcher Steve Carlton warming up were, "Shit, I'll stick him."

In 1985, Dykstra was promoted to the Mets when the team's starting center fielder, Mookie Wilson, was placed on the disabled list. The rookie's play and energy was a big boost to a Mets team that surged to a 98-win season, narrowly missing out on the NL East crown by 3 games to the St. Louis Cardinals. The following season, Dykstra was intended to be platooned in center field with Wilson, but took over the position as outright starter and leadoff hitter when Wilson suffered a severe eye injury during spring training. As the season progressed, Wilson began to get more playing time in left field, as the incumbent leftfielder, George Foster, was struggling, eventually getting released. This allowed Dykstra and Wilson to start in the outfield together, along with star rightfielder Darryl Strawberry. Dykstra earned the nickname "Nails" for his hard-nosed personality and fearless play. Also in 1986, Dykstra posed shirtless for a "beefcake" poster under the "Nails" nickname. Dykstra and #2 hitter Wally Backman were tagged as "The Partners in Grime" for their scrappy play as spark plugs for the star-studded Met lineup.

==== 1986 season ====
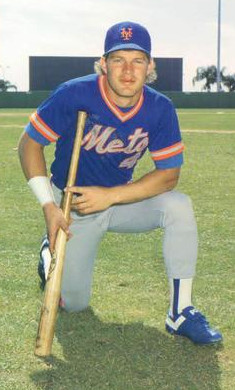
Dykstra in 1986

With Dykstra as leadoff hitter, the 1986 Mets coasted to the division crown, beating the second-place Philadelphia Phillies by 21.5 games en route to a 108–54 season. The Mets ended up in the World Series after a victory over the NL West champion Houston Astros in the 1986 NLCS, 4 games to 2. Dykstra hit a walk-off home run in Game 3, which is considered one of the biggest hits in Mets franchise history and of Dykstra's career. He hit .304 in the 1986 NLCS, and then .296 in the World Series against the Boston Red Sox. His leadoff home run in Game 3 at Fenway Park sparked the Mets, who had lost the first games of the Series at home at Shea Stadium. Dykstra's leadoff home run in Game Three made him the third Met in team history (along with Tommie Agee and Wayne Garrett, both of whose home runs also came in a Game 3, in the 1969 and 1973 World Series respectively), to hit a leadoff home run in the World Series. Following Dykstra's home run, the Mets won Game 3 in blowout fashion 7–1, eventually rallying to defeat the Red Sox in seven games.

==== 1987–1989 ====
Dykstra continued to play in a platoon with Wilson. In the 1988 NLCS against the Los Angeles Dodgers, he continued his postseason success by hitting .429 in a losing effort.

On June 18, 1989, the Mets traded Dykstra to the Phillies along with pitcher Roger McDowell and minor-leaguer Tom Edens in exchange for second baseman Juan Samuel. Teammate Keith Hernandez later characterized Dykstra in his book Pure Baseball as being "on the wild and crazy side", citing one of the reasons the Mets chose to trade him and the Phillies chose to acquire him.

=== Philadelphia Phillies ===
Dykstra was initially upset over the trade since he enjoyed playing in New York, but Phillies fans loved him and he soon became a fan favorite there as well. He was known for his trademark cheek full of tobacco and hard-nosed play. With the Phillies, Dykstra's career was marked by incredible highs and lows. In 1990, he started the All-Star Game, led the league in hits and finished fourth in batting average, hitting over .400 as late as June.

Dykstra's next two seasons were marred by injury. In 1991, he lost two months of playing time due to injuries sustained in an alcohol-related auto accident. In late August, he re-broke his collarbone in Cincinnati running into the outfield wall and missed the rest of the season.

On Opening Day 1992, Dykstra was hit by a pitch that broke his hand. He played in just 145 of 324 possible games for the Phils in 1991 and 1992.

It all came together again in 1993 for Dykstra and the Phillies. The team, which had been rebuilding since its last playoff appearance ten years before, when they won the 1983 pennant but lost the World Series to Baltimore, returned to the top of the National League East and won the pennant again. He played in 161 games, setting a then major league record with 773 plate appearances (overtaken in 2007 by Jimmy Rollins' 778 plate appearances). Despite being overlooked for the 1993 All-Star team he led the league in runs, hits, walks and at-bats, and was runner-up to the Giants' Barry Bonds in voting for NL Most Valuable Player. He led the Phillies into the National League pennant, where he hit six total home runs, which tied the major league record for a postseason that was held by Bob Robertson (this record was tied but not surpassed until 2002). In the World Series, facing the defending World Series champion Toronto Blue Jays, Dykstra batted .348 and hit four home runs, including two in a futile 15–14 loss at home in Game 4. The Phillies lost the series in six games.

In October 2015, Dykstra told Colin Cowherd that beginning in 1993, he paid a team of private investigators $500,000 to dig up dirt on MLB umpires. He used the information, he said, to leverage a more favorable strike zone during games. He said it was not a coincidence that he led the majors in walks in 1993, going from 40 in 392 plate appearances in 1992 to 129 in 773 plate appearances the following year. In 1994, Dykstra walked 68 times in 386 plate appearances. Dykstra's claim of blackmailing umpires was met with considerable skepticism.

Dykstra went on to play in two more All-Star games, in 1994 and 1995.

=== Retirement ===
Injuries plagued Dykstra for the rest of his career. He last played in 1996, although he launched one final comeback attempt in spring training of 1998 before retiring at the age of 35.

== Post-baseball career ==
Dykstra first ran a car wash in Simi Valley, California, but sold it in 2007.

Dykstra purchased NHL superstar Wayne Gretzky's $17 million estate (built at a cost of $14,999,999) hoping to flip it; however, this endeavor was unsuccessful. The house was eventually sold in January 2011 for "an undisclosed amount".

In September 2008, Dykstra began a high-end jet charter company and magazine marketed to professional athletes known as the Player's Club, LLC. The magazine was part of a business plan to offer financial advice to professional athletes, according to a profile article in The New Yorker magazine.

In early 2009, stories and evidence began to emerge indicating that Dykstra's financial empire was in a tailspin. A GQ article by Kevin P. Coughlin, a former photo editor for the New York Post, detailed Coughlin's 67-day employment with Dykstra producing The Players Club, a magazine geared toward athletes and their expensive lifestyles. Coughlin detailed incidents and accused Dykstra of credit card fraud, failure to pay rent on the magazine's Park Avenue offices or for bounced checks, lawsuits, and printing costs.

In March 2009, press reports alleged that Dykstra's businesses were facing financial ruin. They also alleged that he had used offensive terms when speaking about black people, women, and homosexuals.

An extensive ESPN article published in April 2009 asserted that Dykstra had been the subject of at least two dozen legal actions since 2007.

On June 28, 2016, Dykstra released an autobiography titled House of Nails: A Memoir of Life on the Edge. House of Nails landed at No. 11 on the New York Times nonfiction best-seller list for July 17, 2016.

On October 5, 2016, Dykstra and Rebound Finance, a credit referral company, announced their partnership. The partnership is still ongoing with Dykstra acting as the brand's ambassador. According to a press release published by Rebound Finance, the main goal of the partnership is to "provide hard working Americans with the credit they deserve."

=== Public appearances and media appearances ===
In 2000, Dykstra and other members of the 1986 Mets' World Championship team threw out the ceremonial first pitch before Game 5 of the World Series at Shea Stadium against the New York Yankees.

On June 28, 2016, Dykstra appeared on The Howard Stern Show for the first stop on his promotional tour for his bestselling book House of Nails: A Memoir of Life on the Edge and to discuss his sexual conquests. Dykstra also revealed that he is a gigolo for elderly women.

On July 27, 2016, Dykstra appeared on Larry King Now to discuss his book, his MLB career, his use of steroids, and his close friendship with Charlie Sheen.

On November 28, 2016, Dykstra returned to The Howard Stern Show, bringing with him two women to verify the claims he made during his first visit in June. Dykstra also promoted his partnership with Rebound Finance.

Then, on December 17, 2019, Dykstra returned again to The Howard Stern Show playing on Stern's "Hollyweird Squares" game.

== Legal issues ==
In 1991, Dykstra crashed his red Mercedes-Benz SL 500 into a tree on Darby-Paoli Road in Radnor Township, Pennsylvania, after attending the bachelor party of Phillies teammate John Kruk. Dykstra suffered broken ribs, a broken collarbone and a broken facial bone, in addition to second-degree burns on his left arm and lower back. Darren Daulton, also a teammate, was a passenger in the car at the time; his injuries included an injured eye and a broken facial bone. According to Radnor Township Police, Dykstra's blood alcohol content was measured at 0.179% shortly after the crash, a little less than double the legal limit of 0.1% in the state at the time. Dykstra was charged with "driving under the influence of alcohol, speeding and reckless driving".

In 1999, he was arrested for sexual harassment of a 17-year-old girl who worked at his car wash. The criminal charges were later dropped.

Dykstra was sued in relation to his car wash in 2005. The lawsuit, filed by former business partner Lindsay Jones, alleged that Dykstra used steroids and told Jones to place bets on Phillies games in 1993, when Dykstra was on that pennant-winning team. He denied those allegations, but other accusations of steroid use also surfaced.

Dykstra, whose net worth was estimated at $58 million in 2008, filed for Chapter 11 bankruptcy in July 2009, listing less than $50,000 in assets against $10 million to $50 million in liabilities. He claimed to be a victim of mortgage fraud after he lost the house he purchased from Wayne Gretzky to foreclosure. Fireman's Fund Insurance Company provided Dykstra and his wife with a temporary residence pending resolution of the outstanding claim. According to papers filed in court, one of Dykstra's houses was in "unshowable" condition as "the home was littered throughout with empty beer bottles, trash, dog feces and urine, and other unmentionables." Raw sewage had been leaking inside the house, and electrical wiring had been damaged or removed by vandals.

On October 6, 2009, the Wall Street Journal reported that Dykstra's World Series ring had been auctioned off for $56,762 "to help pay the former major-leaguer's $31 million debt." On November 20, 2009, the case was converted to a Chapter 7 bankruptcy to liquidate the estate and pay creditors.

In September 2009, Dykstra was banned from both of his foreclosed multimillion-dollar properties in Lake Sherwood. He was accused of vandalizing the properties and failing to maintain homeowners' insurance on them, and the court assigned a trustee to manage them.

In June 2010, a court-appointed federal trustee in Dykstra's bankruptcy case charged he had lied under oath, improperly hidden and sold assets, and repeatedly acted "in a fraudulent and deceitful manner" during his ongoing bankruptcy case. The trustee accordingly asked the bankruptcy court to deny Dykstra's request for a bankruptcy discharge.

In December 2010, adult entertainment star and escort Monica Foster claimed Dykstra had hired her on December 13, 2010, and had paid her with a bad check.

In January 2011, Dykstra was accused of sexual assault by his housekeeper. She alleged that he had forced her to perform oral sex on him. The woman told investigators "she needed the job and the money, so she went along with the suspect's requests rather than lose her job".

In April 2011, the Los Angeles Police Department Commercial Crimes Division arrested Dykstra on separate grand theft charges related to the purchase of vehicles. He was held on $500,000 bail. On April 13, 2011, Dykstra was arrested for investigation of grand theft by Los Angeles police at his Encino home on suspicion of trying to buy a stolen car, the day after Dykstra, in an unrelated federal complaint, had been charged with embezzling from a bankruptcy estate. He faced up to five years in federal prison if convicted. Federal prosecutors contended that after filing for bankruptcy Dykstra hid, sold, or destroyed more than $400,000 worth of items from the $18.5 million mansion in question without permission of a bankruptcy trustee.

In May 2011, Dykstra was sentenced to house arrest after his bankruptcy fraud indictment. Under the terms of his plea agreement, he was allowed to leave the house only to go to work, attend church, or undergo mandatory drug testing. On June 13, 2011, Dykstra appeared in federal bankruptcy court and pleaded not guilty to 13 charges. He was represented by a public defender. Dykstra faced up to 80 years in prison if convicted of all charges relating to embezzlement, obstruction of justice, bankruptcy fraud, making false statements to bankruptcy court, and concealing property from the bankruptcy court. The bankruptcy fraud trial was set to start on June 5, 2012.

On June 6, 2011, Dykstra was arrested and charged with 25 misdemeanor and felony counts of grand theft auto, identity theft, filing false financial statements and possession of cocaine, ecstasy and the human growth hormone (HGH) known as somatropin. He first pleaded not guilty to the charges, but later changed his plea to no contest to grand theft auto and providing false financial statements in exchange for getting the drug charges dropped. On March 5, 2012, after unsuccessfully trying to withdraw his nolo-contendere plea, he was sentenced to three years in state prison, receiving nearly a year's credit for time already served.

On August 25, 2011, Dykstra was charged with indecent exposure. The Los Angeles City Attorney accused him of placing ads on Craigslist requesting a personal assistant or housekeeping services. The victims alleged that when they arrived, they were informed that the job also required massage service and that Dykstra then exposed himself to them. He was given a nine-month sentence for lewd conduct.

On July 13, 2012, Dykstra pleaded guilty in federal court to three felonies: one count each of bankruptcy fraud, concealment of assets, and money laundering. He admitted to hiding, selling, or destroying over $400,000 worth of items that were supposed to be part of his bankruptcy filing. On December 3, 2012, he was sentenced to six-and-a-half months in prison and 500 hours of community service, and was ordered to pay $200,000 in restitution.

Dykstra was released from the federal penitentiary in Victorville, California, in June 2013 after serving six-and-a-half months of his sentence for the bankruptcy fraud and money laundering charges, which ran concurrently with the grand theft auto and false financial statements charges. As part of his release, he was required to serve three years of supervised release (including 500 hours of community service), enroll in a substance abuse program, submit to drug testing, and pay $200,000 to his creditors. Dykstra finished his probation in April 2014 and had undergone weekly drug testing.

On May 23, 2018, Dykstra was arrested for drug possession and for uttering terroristic threats. He allegedly held a gun to his Uber driver after the driver refused to change destinations. On October 10, 2018, Dykstra was indicted by a New Jersey grand jury on these charges.

Just after midnight on January 1, 2026, Dykstra was arrested during a traffic stop in Greene Township, Pennsylvania. Police allege that Dykstra, a passenger in the stopped vehicle, was in possession of narcotics and narcotic-related paraphernalia.

In his book 108 Stitches, former Dykstra teammate Ron Darling alleged that Dykstra hurled racist taunts at Red Sox pitcher Oil Can Boyd from the on-deck circle during the 1986 World Series. Dykstra publicly and vociferously denied the story and was publicly supported in his denial by former teammates Dwight Gooden, Kevin Mitchell, Darryl Strawberry and Wally Backman. Dykstra sued Darling for defamation in April 2020 but the case was dismissed on June 1, 2020, with the judge citing Dykstra's documented reputation as being "among other things, racist, misogynist and anti-gay, as well as a sexual predator, a drug-abuser, a thief and an embezzler" as the reason.

== Personal life ==
=== Family ===
Dykstra married wife, Terri, in 1985. Lenny and Terri Dykstra have two sons, Cutter and Luke; Lenny also adopted Terri's son, Gavin, from a prior relationship. Terri Dykstra filed for divorce in April 2009.

Cutter Dykstra was drafted by the Milwaukee Brewers in the second round of the 2008 Major League Baseball draft, and played in the Washington Nationals organization until being released on June 14, 2016. Through Cutter's relationship with actress Jamie-Lynn Sigler, Dykstra has two grandsons. Luke Dykstra was drafted by the Atlanta Braves in the seventh round of the 2014 MLB draft and last played for the Sugar Land Skeeters of the Atlantic League of Professional Baseball in 2018.

In 2014, Dykstra lived with his ex-wife, Terri, who said that she had no plans to remarry him.

In 2018, Dykstra attended a weekly Torah study class led by Rabbi Shmuel Metzger of Chabad of Sutton Place, describing the class as part of a spiritual search while saying that he did not plan to convert to Judaism.

As of Summer 2024, Dykstra lives in Scranton, Pennsylvania.

=== Health ===
On February 14, 2024, Dykstra suffered a stroke and was hospitalized in a Los Angeles hospital.

=== Mitchell Report; steroid use ===
Dykstra was named in the Mitchell Report on steroid use in Major League Baseball on December 13, 2007. The report cited multiple sources, including Kirk Radomski, as stating that Dykstra had used anabolic steroids during his MLB career. It also stated that the Commissioner of Baseball's office had known about Dykstra's steroid use since 2000. Dykstra did not agree to meet with the Mitchell investigators to discuss the allegations.

In Randall Lane's book The Zeroes, Dykstra admitted in his hotel room to Lane, editor of Trader Monthly, that he used steroids to perform better than those he felt might replace him; otherwise, his $25 million would be "on the line".

On December 20, 2007, Dykstra was also named in former MLB pitcher Jason Grimsley's unsealed affidavit as an alleged user of steroids.

== See also ==
- List of Major League Baseball players named in the Mitchell Report

Preceded by Ellis Burks	National League Player of the Month; May 1994 (with Mike Piazza)	Succeeded by Jeff Bagwell
