= José DeJesús =

American baseball player (born 1965)

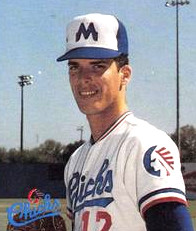
- DeJesus in 1988
- Pitcher
- Born: January 6, 1965 (age 61); Brooklyn, New York, U.S.
- Batted: Right Threw: Right

MLB debut
- September 9, 1988, for the Kansas City Royals

Last MLB appearance
- August 8, 1994, for the Kansas City Royals

MLB statistics
- Win–loss record: 20–19
- Earned run average: 3.84
- Strikeouts: 221

CPBL statistics
- Win–loss record: 4–7
- Earned run average: 4.82
- Strikeouts: 86
- Stats at Baseball Reference

Teams
- Kansas City Royals (1988–1989); Philadelphia Phillies (1990–1991); Kansas City Royals (1994); Mercuries Tigers (1996–1997)

José Luis DeJesús (born January 6, 1965) is an American former professional baseball right-handed starting pitcher. He played in Major League Baseball (MLB) from 1988 to 1994, with the Kansas City Royals and Philadelphia Phillies. DeJesús batted right-handed.

In 1988 and 1989, DeJesús played in only five games for the Kansas City Royals, with an 0–1 record. He played 1990 and 1991 with the Philadelphia Phillies, where he went 7–8 and 10–9, respectively. After a sitting out the 1992 season with injuries, DeJesús rehabbed in the Phillies’ farm system, in 1993. In 1994, he returned to the Royals, posting a 3–1 record. DeJesús continued his career in the Royals’ and New York Yankees’ minor league organizations, briefly retiring after the 1996 campaign. In 1998 and 1999, he played in the Independent Leagues.

DeJesús was born in Brooklyn, New York, and now resides in Cidra, Puerto Rico.
