= Rosario Rodríguez =

Mexican baseball player (born 1969)

- Pitcher
- Born: July 8, 1969 (age 57); Los Mochis, Sinaloa, Mexico
- Batted: Right Threw: Left

MLB debut
- September 1, 1989, for the Cincinnati Reds

Last MLB appearance
- October 4, 1991, for the Pittsburgh Pirates

MLB statistics
- Win–loss record: 2–2
- Earned run average: 4.80
- Strikeouts: 18
- Stats at Baseball Reference

Teams
- Cincinnati Reds (1989–1990); Pittsburgh Pirates (1991)

Rosario Isabel Rodríguez Echavarria (born July 8, 1969) is a Mexican former professional baseball pitcher. He played in Major League Baseball (MLB) for the Cincinnati Reds and the Pittsburgh Pirates. He debuted on September 1, 1989 with the Reds and against his future team, the Pirates. He was the youngest player to play in the National League in 1989.

Rodríguez attended high school in Mexico City. In March 1987, the Cincinnati Reds signed him as an amateur free agent at the age of 17. He spent the 1987 one season with the Reds' rookie team, pitching in 17 games and posting a 1–5 record and a 3.08 earned run average (ERA). Rodríguez split the 1988 season between the Cedar Rapids Reds and the Greensboro Hornets. With Greensboro, he pitched in 23 games with an ERA of only 1.52. He spent the 1989 season with the Chattanooga Lookouts of the Southern League, where he pitched in 28 games, won three and lost none with a 4.47 ERA. At the conclusion of the minor league season, he was called up by the Reds to make his debut.

Rodríguez made his major league debut on September 1, 1989 against the Pittsburgh Pirates. Over the course of the 1989 Cincinnati Reds season, he pitched in seven games, posted a 1–1 record, and was the youngest player in the National League that season at the age of 20. He spent the off-season in the Mexican League, then in March 1991 was signed to a one-year deal along with Rob Dibble, Chris Sabo, and Reggie Jefferson. He again spent most of the season in the minors, mainly playing for Chattanooga but also playing five games for the Nashville Sounds. He pitched in 36 games for Chattanooga and had a 4.36 ERA. During the 1990 Cincinnati Reds season, he pitched in nine games and had a 6.10 ERA, not winning or losing any games.

While Rodríguez was on the winter roster for the Reds, he was waived by the team in December. On December 20, the Pittsburgh Pirates claimed him off waivers. He was scheduled to be in camp by February 21, but due to visa problems, he did not arrive in camp until March. He split time with the Buffalo Bisons and the Pirates that season. With Buffalo, he pitched in 48 games and posted a 4–3 record and a 3.00 ERA. During the 1991 Pittsburgh Pirates season, he pitched in 18 games and had an ERA of 4.11. He also had one appearance during the 1991 National League Championship Series, allowing three runs in one inning against the Atlanta Braves.

His final professional season was in 1992 with the Bisons. In four games, Rodríguez had an ERA of 18.00. He spent three occasions on the disabled list that season with shoulder trouble, the third stint in June costing him the season. He was released from the Pirates in March 1993, ending his professional career.
