= Paul Miller (baseball) =

American baseball player (born 1965)

- Pitcher
- Born: April 27, 1965 (age 60); Burlington, Wisconsin
- Batted: Right Threw: Right

MLB debut
- July 30, 1991, for the Pittsburgh Pirates

Last MLB appearance
- September 28, 1993, for the Pittsburgh Pirates

MLB statistics
- Win–loss record: 1–0
- Earned run average: 4.10
- Strikeouts: 9
- Stats at Baseball Reference

Teams
- Pittsburgh Pirates (1991–1993)

Paul Robert Miller (born April 27, 1965) is a former professional baseball pitcher. He played parts of three seasons in Major League Baseball for the Pittsburgh Pirates from 1991 until 1993.

Miller spent his entire professional career in the Pirates organization. He was drafted by the Pirates in the 53rd round of the 1987 Major League Baseball draft, and made his major league debut four years later. He pitched 10 games over three seasons, with one win and no losses. He spent one more season in the minors in 1994 before retiring.
