= Steve Searcy =

American baseball player (born 1964)

- Pitcher
- Born: June 4, 1964 (age 62); Knoxville, Tennessee, U.S.
- Batted: Left Threw: Left

MLB debut
- August 29, 1988, for the Detroit Tigers

Last MLB appearance
- June 1, 1992, for the Philadelphia Phillies

MLB statistics
- Win–loss record: 6–13
- Earned run average: 5.68
- Strikeouts: 140
- Stats at Baseball Reference

Teams
- Detroit Tigers (1988–1991); Philadelphia Phillies (1991–1992)

William Steven Searcy (born June 4, 1964) is an American former professional baseball pitcher who played in Major League Baseball (MLB) for the Detroit Tigers and Philadelphia Phillies.

== Early years ==
Though he is naturally right handed, Searcy was born with osteomyelitis in his right shoulder. Thus, he does some tasks with his left hand, including throwing a baseball.

Hailing from Knoxville, Tennessee, Searcy attended the University of Tennessee. With a team leading 2.45 earned run average (ERA) and 95.1 innings pitched, he led the Tennessee Volunteers baseball team to a second-place finish in the 1984 Southeastern Conference baseball tournament. Following one more season playing college ball, he was drafted by the Detroit Tigers in the third round of the 1985 Major League Baseball draft.

In 1986, Searcy went 11–6 with a 3.30 ERA and 139 strikeouts over 27 starts for the Glens Falls Tigers in their inaugural season. A knee injury limited Searcy to just 53.1 innings in 1987. Injuries aside, however, the Tigers were reluctant to part with their young pitcher at the 1987 trade deadline when they were in need of a veteran arm for the major league club's playoff drive. Instead, they opted to ship fellow minor league pitcher John Smoltz to the Atlanta Braves for Doyle Alexander.

He returned healthy in 1988 to go 13–7 with a 2.59 ERA and 176 strikeouts for the Toledo Mud Hens to earn International League Most Valuable Pitcher honors and a call up to the majors in late August.

== Detroit Tigers ==
Searcy made his major league debut on August 29, 1988, against the Chicago White Sox at old Comiskey Park. Starting, he pitched seven plus strong innings, but was tagged with the loss. In his second and final start of the season, Searcy faced six Milwaukee Brewers batters, and gave up three runs (2 earned) while only retiring one batter before being lifted.

Arthroscopic surgery on his left shoulder kept Searcy off the mound til June of 1989. After eighteen rehab starts for the Lakeland Tigers and Toledo, Searcy made his first major league appearance of the 1989 season on August 20, starting against the New York Yankees. After four relief appearances, Searcy made a second start against the Minnesota Twins on September 17 to earn his first major league win.

He split the 1990 season between Toledo and Detroit. After winning his first start with the Tigers, his record fell to 1–5 with a 5.43 ERA before he would earn a second win.

Searcy won a spot in Detroit's starting rotation out of Spring training 1991. After failing to get out of the third inning in three of his five starts, Searcy was demoted to the bullpen. Searcy was still unable to find his groove as a reliever, and was demoted to the minors. With this being his seventh minor league season, he was granted free agency.

== Philadelphia Phillies ==
After initially talking with the Los Angeles Dodgers, Searcy signed with the Philadelphia Phillies on July 15, 1991. Coincidentally, his first appearance for the Phillies came against the Dodgers at Veterans Stadium. He entered the game in the fifth inning with the Phillies trailing 6–3, and allowed one earned run in two innings. The Phillies, meanwhile, scored four runs in the bottom of the fifth and another in the sixth to earn Searcy the win in his first National League appearance.

His 2–1 record and 4.15 ERA with the Phillies was good enough to earn him a one-year contract for 1992. After ten appearances with no wins or losses and a 6.10 ERA, he was traded to the Dodgers for outfielder Stan Javier on July 2.

Searcy spent the rest of the 1992 season assigned to the Dodgers' triple A Pacific Coast League affiliate, the Albuquerque Dukes. After the season, he signed a minor league deal with the Baltimore Orioles with a non-roster invitation to Spring training for the open fifth starter and long reliever spots for 1993 season. Unable to land either position, he spent the season with the triple A Rochester Red Wings, where he went 2–1 with a 6.00 ERA in sixteen relief appearances.
