= Scott Bullett =

American baseball player (born 1968)

- Outfielder
- Born: December 25, 1968 (age 57); Martinsburg, West Virginia, U.S.
- Batted: Left Threw: Left

Professional debut
- MLB: September 3, 1991, for the Pittsburgh Pirates
- CPBL: April 17, 1998, for the Uni-President Lions
- NPB: May 7, 2002, for the Chunichi Dragons

Last appearance
- MLB: September 29, 1996, for the Chicago Cubs
- CPBL: October 25, 1998, for the Uni-President Lions
- NPB: September 22, 2002, for the Chunichi Dragons

MLB statistics
- Batting average: .233
- Home runs: 6
- Runs batted in: 42

CPBL statistics
- Batting average: .303
- Home runs: 9
- Runs batted in: 64

NPB statistics
- Batting average: .201
- Home runs: 7
- Runs batted in: 15
- Stats at Baseball Reference

Teams
- Pittsburgh Pirates (1991, 1993); Chicago Cubs (1995–1996); Uni-President Lions (1998); Chunichi Dragons (2002)

Scott Douglas Bullett (born December 25, 1968) is an American former professional baseball outfielder. He played all or part of four seasons between 1991 and 1996. He also played one season in Japan with the Chunichi Dragons in 2002. Towards the end of his career, he played in the Mexican Professional Summer League. Bullett now runs Bullettproof Baseball Academy, an elite youth baseball program in Welland, Ontario.
