= Doug Lindsey =

American baseball player (born 1967)

- Catcher
- Born: September 22, 1967 (age 58); Austin, Texas
- Batted: Right Threw: Right

MLB debut
- October 3, 1991, for the Philadelphia Phillies

Last MLB appearance
- October 2, 1993, for the Chicago White Sox

MLB statistics
- Batting average: .167
- Runs batted in: 0
- Hits: 1
- Stats at Baseball Reference

Teams
- Philadelphia Phillies (1991, 1993); Chicago White Sox (1993)

Michael Douglas Lindsey (born September 22, 1967) is an American former professional baseball catcher, who played in Major League Baseball (MLB) during two seasons for the Philadelphia Phillies and Chicago White Sox. He was drafted by the Phillies in the 6th round of the 1987 Major League Baseball draft.

In 1987, Lindsey played his first professional season with the Phillies’ Class A (Short Season) Utica Blue Sox farm team, and his last season with the White Sox' Triple-A affiliates Nashville Sounds, and the Baltimore Orioles' Double-A Bowie Baysox in 1994.
