= Ricky Jordan =

American baseball player (born 1965)

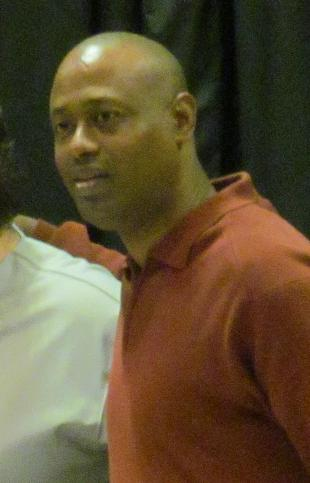
- Jordan in 2012
- First baseman
- Born: May 26, 1965 (age 61); Richmond, California, U.S.
- Batted: Right Threw: Right

MLB debut
- July 17, 1988, for the Philadelphia Phillies

Last MLB appearance
- September 20, 1996, for the Seattle Mariners

MLB statistics
- Batting average: .281
- Home runs: 55
- Runs batted in: 304
- Stats at Baseball Reference

Teams
- Philadelphia Phillies (1988–1994); Seattle Mariners (1996)

Paul Scott Jordan (born May 26, 1965) is an American former professional baseball first baseman. He played in Major League Baseball (MLB) from 1988 to 1996 for the Philadelphia Phillies and Seattle Mariners. He was noted for being a very good pinch hitter.

== Early life ==
Jordan was born in Richmond, California. He was adopted when he was a few days old. Jordan's adoptive father died when he was five, and one of his youth sports coaches became very influential in his upbringing. He attended Grant Union High School in Sacramento, California.

== Baseball career ==
Jordan was selected in the first round with the 22nd overall selection of the 1983 MLB draft by the Philadelphia Phillies. In his first MLB game on July 17, 1988, Jordan hit a home run during his first at bat.

Jordan played with Philadelphia through the 1994 season. He spent 1995 in Triple-A in the California Angels organization. The Mariners purchased his contract in March 1996. He played in 15 games for Seattle in his final MLB season. He finished his professional career in Double-A in 1997.

In 677 MLB games over eight seasons, Jordan had a .281 batting average with 261 runs, 116 doubles, 55 home runs, 304 RBI, 77 bases on balls, and a .424 slugging percentage. He finished his career with a .993 fielding percentage playing 510 games at first base and 11 games in left field. In five postseason games, he hit .182 (2-for-11) with no runs or RBIs.

Jordan was inducted into the Sacramento Sports Hall of Fame in 2026.
