= John Smiley (baseball) =

American baseball player (born 1965)

- Pitcher
- Born: March 17, 1965 (age 61); Phoenixville, Pennsylvania, U.S.
- Batted: Left Threw: Left

MLB debut
- September 1, 1986, for the Pittsburgh Pirates

Last MLB appearance
- August 30, 1997, for the Cleveland Indians

MLB statistics
- Win–loss record: 126–103
- Earned run average: 3.80
- Strikeouts: 1,284
- Stats at Baseball Reference

Teams
- Pittsburgh Pirates (1986–1991); Minnesota Twins (1992); Cincinnati Reds (1993–1997); Cleveland Indians (1997)

Career highlights and awards
- 2× All-Star (1991, 1995); NL wins leader (1991)

John Patrick Smiley (born March 17, 1965) is an American former Major League Baseball pitcher who played for the Pittsburgh Pirates, the Minnesota Twins, the Cincinnati Reds, and the Cleveland Indians, from 1986 to 1997.

== Early life ==
Smiley graduated from Perkiomen Valley High School in 1983, where he played sports as a baseball pitcher, basketball point guard, and football quarterback.

== Career ==
Despite never playing minor league baseball higher than Class A, Smiley entered spring training before the 1987 season with a relief pitcher role already in place, with manager Jim Leyland saying he would have to "pitch his way off the club". In Smiley's first full season, he led the Pirates in appearances with 63 games. Smiley was converted to a starting pitcher in 1988, lowering his earned run average by a full 2.5 runs per game, posting a 3.25 ERA and 13 wins against 11 losses.

On April 26, 1990, Smiley threw a complete game against the San Francisco Giants in 87 pitches, of which 73 were strikes, which remains a major league record for strike percentage in a single game. He allowed three hits and a single run, and struck out six batters, facing only three above the minimum.

Smiley was a two time All-Star: as a Pirate in 1991, a season in which Smiley led the National League with twenty wins and finished third in the Cy Young Award balloting; and in 1995 with the Reds, a season in which he had twelve wins and five losses. In August 1995, Smiley surrendered a home run to Braves pitcher Tom Glavine — the only homer Glavine hit in his major league career.

On July 31, 1997, the Reds traded Smiley along with Jeff Branson to the Indians for Jim Crowell, Danny Graves, Damian Jackson and Scott Winchester. That September, Smiley broke his left humerus while warming up for a start; the injury ended his baseball career.

== See also ==
- List of Major League Baseball annual wins leaders
