= Steve Buechele =

American baseball player and coach (born 1961)

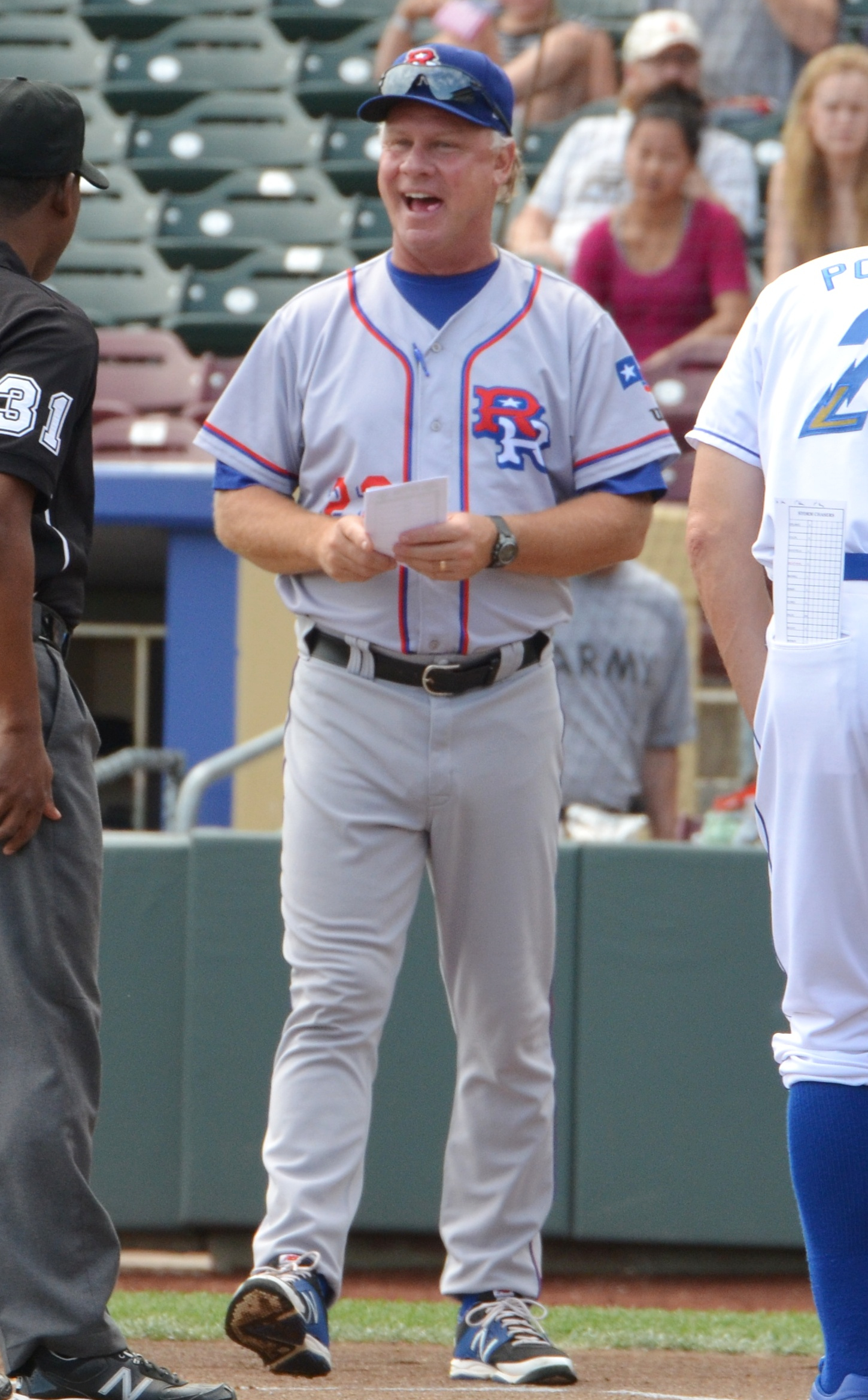
- Buechele as manager for the Round Rock Express in 2014
- Third baseman
- Born: September 26, 1961 (age 65); Lancaster, California, U.S.
- Batted: Right Threw: Right

MLB debut
- July 19, 1985, for the Texas Rangers

Last MLB appearance
- July 29, 1995, for the Texas Rangers

MLB statistics
- Batting average: .245
- Home runs: 137
- Runs batted in: 547
- Stats at Baseball Reference

Teams
- Texas Rangers (1985–1991); Pittsburgh Pirates (1991–1992); Chicago Cubs (1992–1995); Texas Rangers (1995)

Steven Bernard Buechele (born September 26, 1961) is an American former Major League Baseball third baseman, coach, and current front office executive for the Texas Rangers. Buechele played from 1985 to 1995 for the Texas Rangers, Pittsburgh Pirates, and Chicago Cubs. He joined the Rangers in 1985 after he was named the Tom Grieve Minor League Player of the Year. He was traded from the Rangers to the Pirates in 1991 following the emergence of Dean Palmer. He returned to the Rangers for an eighth season in 1995.

== Playing career ==
Buechele was drafted by the Chicago White Sox in 1979 but did not sign. He was drafted again in 1982 by the Texas Rangers and spent several years in the minor leagues before breaking into the majors in 1985 with the Rangers. He had a career year in 1991 when he had a batting average of .267 along with 18 home runs and 66 RBI while only committing three errors for an MLB-record .991 fielding percentage at third base. Although he did not fare as well in 31 games with the Pirates, hitting just .246, he still finished the year with career highs in hits, home runs, slugging percentage, RBI, and runs scored. He also made his only postseason appearances, hitting .304 for Pittsburgh in the 1991 National League Championship Series against the Atlanta Braves.

Buechele's career stats include 137 home runs, 547 RBI, and a .971 fielding percentage. Throughout his career, Buechele was known for hitting solo home runs.

Buechele ranks 12th in Rangers' club history for total games with 889 games played and 16th for at-bats (2723). Additionally, the 25 times he was hit by a pitch is the 13th highest in Rangers' franchise history and his 73 grounded into double plays is the 14th highest. In Rangers' fielding stats, he is 21st (2476) in total chances, 7th (1675) in assists, 15th (66) in errors, and 33rd (165) in double plays. He was a candidate for the Texas Rangers Baseball Hall of Fame in 2005 and 2006.

== Post-playing career ==
Buechele continues to be a part of the professional baseball world, including serving as one of the hosts and coaches for the Texas Rangers 2006 Media Spring Training. In August 2008, Buechele began to serve as a studio commentator for the Ranger's pre and post-game shows on Fox Sports Southwest. He was the first base coach for the Texas Rangers from 2015 to 2018.

On November 14, 2018, it was announced that Buechele would be moving from his role as the first base coach, to be a special assistant in the baseball operations department of the Texas Rangers front office.

== Personal life ==
Steve graduated from Servite High School (Anaheim, CA) in 1979. Steve and his wife Nancy reside in Arlington, Texas. They have five children. His eldest son Garrett played baseball for the University of Oklahoma and was drafted by the San Francisco Giants 14th round of the 2011 Major League Baseball draft, and his middle son Tanner played baseball for Fullerton College. Steve has two daughters, Jordan and Amber, both of whom attend the University of Oklahoma. His youngest son, Shane, attended Texas and SMU, where he played quarterback for the Mustangs. In 2021 he was signed as an undrafted free agent by the Kansas City Chiefs.

At Stanford University, his roommate was Hall of Fame quarterback John Elway. He is a member of Delta Tau Delta fraternity.
