= 1991 Cincinnati Reds season =

1991 Cincinnati Reds
- League: National League
- Division: West
- Ballpark: Riverfront Stadium
- City: Cincinnati, Ohio
- Record: 74–88 (.457)
- Divisional place: 5th
- Owners: Marge Schott
- General managers: Bob Quinn
- Managers: Lou Piniella
- Television: WLWT, SportsChannel (Marty Brennaman, Gordy Coleman, Steve LaMar)
- Radio: WLW (Marty Brennaman, Joe Nuxhall)

The 1991 Cincinnati Reds season was the 122nd season for the franchise in Major League Baseball, and their 22nd and 21st full season at Riverfront Stadium. The Reds attempted to defend their World Series championship from 1990, but the team would finish with a losing mark, regressing 17 games from the season before. Their winning percentage (.457) set a new record for worst among defending World Series champions, besting the previous mark set by the Chicago White Sox in 1918. This would be a record for seven years.

== Offseason ==
- January 29, 1990: Skeeter Barnes was signed as a free agent by the Reds.
- December 5, 1990: Bill Doran was signed as a free agent with the Cincinnati Reds.

== Regular season ==
- April 28, 1991: Against the Cubs, relief pitcher Rob Dibble nearly blew a save, allowing two runs on five hits. Clinging to a 4–3 lead in the ninth with the tying run on first, Dibble struck out Ryne Sandberg to finish the game. Despite the win, in frustration he then flung a baseball 400 feet into the center-field seats, inadvertently striking a woman.
- June 28, 1991: Barry Larkin had six RBIs in a game against the Houston Astros.
- Barry Larkin had a 19-game hitting streak.
- At the beginning of July, the Reds peaked at ten games above .500 (44–34). They were in second place in the NL West, only four games behind the Dodgers, and 3.5 games ahead of third place Atlanta.
- On July 6, the Reds spiraled after a 3-0 loss to the Astros. They would lose ten games in a row from that day to July 19 that dropped them to .500 (44-44). They won the next day and ended July at .500 (49-49)
- August saw the Reds essentially drop from contention. They would teeter around .500 before dropping down below the mark for good on August 31.
- July 23, 1991: In the bottom of the eight inning of a 8–5 loss at the Cubs, Rob Dibble (fresh off a three-game suspension) was ejected for throwing the ball into the back of the leg of baserunner Doug Dascenzo.

=== Season standings ===
NL West
Team	W	L	Pct.	GB	Home	Road
Atlanta Braves	94	68	.580	—	48‍–‍33	46‍–‍35
Los Angeles Dodgers	93	69	.574	1	54‍–‍27	39‍–‍42
San Diego Padres	84	78	.519	10	42‍–‍39	42‍–‍39
San Francisco Giants	75	87	.463	19	43‍–‍38	32‍–‍49
Cincinnati Reds	74	88	.457	20	39‍–‍42	35‍–‍46
Houston Astros	65	97	.401	29	37‍–‍44	28‍–‍53

=== Record vs. opponents ===
1991 National League record Sources:
Team	ATL	CHC	CIN	HOU	LAD	MON	NYM	PHI	PIT	SD	SF	STL
Atlanta	—	6–6	11–7	13–5	7–11	5–7	9–3	5–7	9–3	11–7	9–9	9–3
Chicago	6–6	—	4–8	9–3	2–10	10–7	11–6	8–10	7–11	4–8	6–6	10–8
Cincinnati	7–11	8–4	—	9–9	6–12	6–6	5–7	9–3	2–10	8–10	10–8	4–8
Houston	5–13	3–9	9–9	—	8–10	2–10	7–5	7–5	4–8	6–12	9–9	5–7
Los Angeles	11–7	10–2	12–6	10–8	—	5–7	7–5	7–5	7–5	10–8	8–10	6–6
Montreal	7–5	7–10	6–6	10–2	7–5	—	4–14	4–14	6–12	6–6	7–5	7–11
New York	3–9	6–11	7–5	5–7	5–7	14–4	—	11–7	6–12	7–5	6–6	7–11
Philadelphia	7-5	10–8	3–9	5–7	5–7	14–4	7–11	—	6–12	9–3	6–6	6–12
Pittsburgh	3–9	11–7	10–2	8–4	5–7	12–6	12–6	12–6	—	7–5	7–5	11–7
San Diego	7–11	8–4	10–8	12–6	8–10	6–6	5–7	3–9	5–7	—	11–7	9–3
San Francisco	9–9	6–6	8–10	9–9	10–8	5–7	6–6	6–6	5–7	7–11	—	4–8
St. Louis	3–9	8–10	8–4	7–5	6–6	11–7	11–7	12–6	7–11	3–9	8–4	—

=== Notable transactions ===
- June 14, 1991: Reggie Jefferson was traded by the Cincinnati Reds to the Cleveland Indians for Tim Costo.
- July 18, 1991: Stan Jefferson was signed as a free agent with the Cincinnati Reds.

=== Roster ===
1991 Cincinnati Reds
Roster
Pitchers: 40 Jack Armstrong; 38 Keith Brown; 32 Tom Browning; 36 Don Carman; 37 Norm Charlton; 49 Rob Dibble; 54 Steve Foster; 59 Kip Gross; 45 Chris Hammond; 39 Milt Hill; 43 Tim Layana; 33 Gino Minutelli; 28 Randy Myers; 48 Ted Power; 27 José Rijo; 52 Mo Sanford; 47 Scott Scudder	Catchers: 9 Joe Oliver; 34 Jeff Reed; 6 Donnie Scott; 55 Glenn Sutko; Infielders: 57 Freddie Benavides; 25 Todd Benzinger; 19 Bill Doran; 7 Mariano Duncan; 42 Reggie Jefferson; 11 Barry Larkin; 26 Terry Lee; 25 Carmelo Martínez; 23 Hal Morris; 10 Luis Quiñones; 17 Chris Sabo	Outfielders: 15 Glenn Braggs; 44 Eric Davis; 22 Billy Hatcher; 42 Stan Jefferson; 20 Chris Jones; 21 Paul O'Neill; 53 Reggie Sanders; 29 Herm Winningham	Manager: 41 Lou Piniella; Coaches: 4 Jackie Moore (bench); 24 Tony Pérez (hitting/first base); 2 Sam Perlozzo (third base); 3 Larry Rothschild (bullpen); 35 Stan Williams (pitching)

== Player stats ==
=== Batting ===
==== Starters by position ====
Note: Pos = Position; G = Games played; AB = At bats; H = Hits; Avg. = Batting average; HR = Home runs; RBI = Runs batted in

Pos	Player	G	AB	H	Avg.	HR	RBI
C	Jeff Reed	91	270	72	.267	3	31
1B	Hal Morris	136	478	152	.318	14	59
2B	Bill Doran	111	361	101	.280	6	35
3B	Chris Sabo	153	582	175	.301	26	88
SS	Barry Larkin	123	464	140	.302	20	69
LF	Billy Hatcher	138	442	116	.262	4	41
CF	Eric Davis	89	285	67	.235	11	33
RF	Paul O'Neill	153	532	136	.256	28	91

==== Other batters ====
Note: G = Games played; AB = At bats; H = Hits; Avg. = Batting average; HR = Home runs; RBI = Runs batted in

Player	G	AB	H	Avg.	HR	RBI
Mariano Duncan	100	333	86	.258	12	40
Joe Oliver	94	269	58	.216	11	41
Glenn Braggs	85	250	65	.260	11	39
Luis Quiñones	97	212	47	.222	4	20
Herm Winningham	98	169	38	.225	1	4
Carmelo Martínez	53	138	32	.232	6	19
Todd Benzinger	51	123	23	.187	1	11
Chris Jones	52	89	26	.292	2	6
Freddie Benavides	24	63	18	.286	0	3
Reggie Sanders	9	40	8	.200	1	3
Stan Jefferson	13	19	1	.053	0	0
Donnie Scott	10	19	3	.158	0	0
Glenn Sutko	10	10	1	.100	0	1
Reggie Jefferson	5	7	1	.143	1	1
Terry Lee	3	6	0	.000	0	0

=== Pitching ===
==== Starting pitchers ====
Note: G = Games pitched; IP = Innings pitched; W = Wins; L = Losses; ERA = Earned run average; SO = Strikeouts

Player	G	IP	W	L	ERA	SO
Tom Browning	36	230.1	14	14	4.18	115
José Rijo	30	204.1	15	6	2.51	172
Jack Armstrong	27	139.2	7	13	5.48	93
Chris Hammond	20	99.2	7	7	4.06	50
Mo Sanford	5	28.0	1	2	3.86	31

==== Other pitchers ====
Note: G = Games pitched; IP = Innings pitched; W = Wins; L = Losses; ERA = Earned run average; SO = Strikeouts

Player	G	IP	W	L	ERA	SO
Randy Myers	58	132.0	6	13	3.55	108
Norm Charlton	39	108.1	3	5	2.91	77
Scott Scudder	27	101.1	6	9	4.35	51
Kip Gross	29	85.2	6	4	3.47	40
Gino Minutelli	16	25.1	0	2	6.04	21

==== Relief pitchers ====
Note: G = Games pitched; W = Wins; L = Losses; SV = Saves; ERA = Earned run average; SO = Strikeouts

Player	G	W	L	SV	ERA	SO
Rob Dibble	67	3	5	31	3.17	124
Ted Power	68	5	3	3	3.62	51
Don Carman	28	0	2	1	5.25	15
Milt Hill	22	1	1	0	3.78	20
Tim Layana	22	0	2	0	6.97	14
Steve Foster	11	0	0	0	1.93	11
Keith Brown	11	0	0	0	2.25	4

== Awards and honors ==
All-Star Game

- Tom Browning, pitcher
- Rob Dibble, relief pitcher
- Barry Larkin, shortstop
- Lou Piniella, manager

== Farm system ==
Level	Team	League	Manager
AAA	Nashville Sounds	American Association	Pete Mackanin
AA	Chattanooga Lookouts	Southern League	Jim Tracy
A	Cedar Rapids Reds	Midwest League	Frank Funk
A	Charleston Wheelers	South Atlantic League	P. J. Carey and Dave Miley
Rookie	Princeton Reds	Appalachian League	Sam Mejías
Rookie	Billings Mustangs	Pioneer League	P. J. Carey
