= 1990 Cincinnati Reds season =

Major League Baseball season

1990 Cincinnati Reds
- World Series champions National League champions National League West champions
- League: National League
- Division: West
- Ballpark: Riverfront Stadium
- City: Cincinnati, Ohio
- Record: 91–71 (.562)
- Divisional place: 1st
- Owners: Marge Schott
- General managers: Bob Quinn
- Managers: Lou Piniella
- Television: WLWT (Johnny Bench, Tom Hume, Steve LaMar, Gordy Coleman)
- Radio: WLW (Marty Brennaman, Joe Nuxhall)

The 1990 Cincinnati Reds season was the 121st season for the franchise in Major League Baseball, and their 21st and 20th full season at Riverfront Stadium. Starting with a team best nine straight wins to open the season, as well as holding the top spot in the National League West every game during the season, the Reds went 41–21 after 62 games, splitting the remaining 100 games 50–50 to end up with a 91–71 record. It consisted of the 91–71 Reds winning the National League West by five games over the second-place Dodgers, as well as the NLCS in six games over the Pittsburgh Pirates, and the World Series in a four-game sweep over the overwhelming favorite Oakland Athletics, who had won the World Series the previous year. It was the fifth World Championship for the Reds, and their first since winning two consecutive titles in 1975 and '76. It is also their most recent championship to date.

== Offseason ==
- December 6, 1989: John Franco and Don Brown (minors) were traded by the Reds to the New York Mets for Randy Myers and Kip Gross.
- December 12, 1989: Tim Leary and Van Snider were traded by the Reds to the New York Yankees for Hal Morris and Rodney Imes (minors).

== Regular season ==
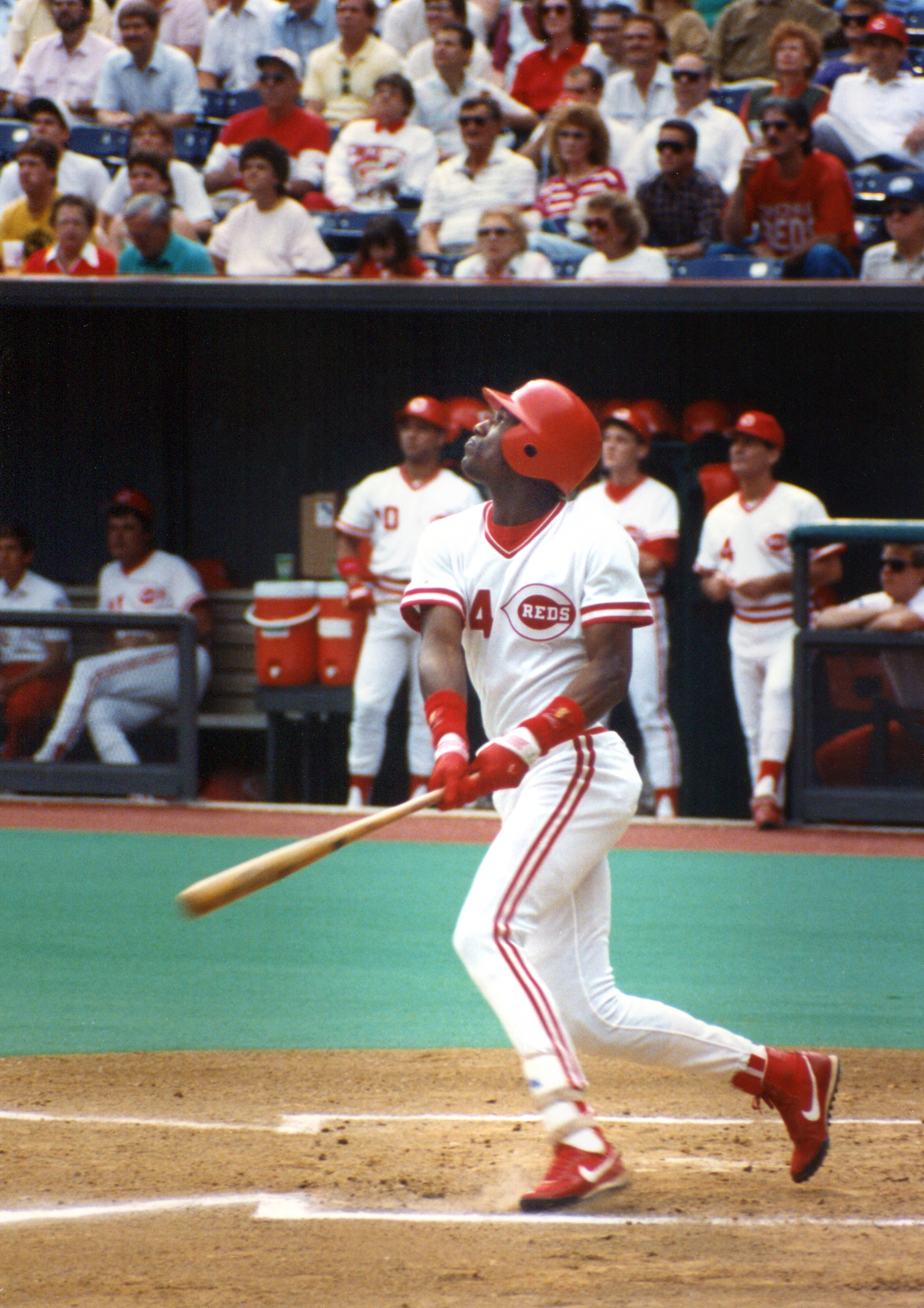
Eric Davis in 1990

Led by new manager Lou Piniella, the Reds achieved the rare feat of being in first place every day of the season ("wire-to-wire"). They also became just the second National League team to do so after the '55 Dodgers. Starting pitcher Jack Armstrong was a catalyst for the team's fast start, as he won 8 of his first 9 games and was 11–3 through the All Star break. Because of his strong first half, Armstrong was selected as the starting pitcher for the All Star Game.

The Reds clinched the NL West division on Saturday September 29 in a rain-shortened, seven-inning 3–1 home loss to San Diego. The second-place Dodgers lost to the Giants at the same time, mathematically clinching the division for Cincinnati with four games remaining.

=== Opening Day ===
Due to the 1990 lockout, Opening Day was pushed back one week from April 2 to April 9. As a result, the Reds, who traditionally started every major league season with the first pitch at home on opening day, were forced to start on the road. The Reds played three games at Houston and three games at Atlanta before returning for their home opener on Tuesday April 17. It was only the third time since 1876 that the Reds opened the season with an away game. The traditional Findlay Market parade, along with other customary opening day festivities, were held off until April 17 and rebranded "Reds Homecoming." On a chilly 49° afternoon, the 6–0 Reds beat San Diego in front of a crowd of 38,384 at Riverfront Stadium - small for opening day standards - to improve to 7–0 on the season.

=== 1990 Major League Baseball All-Star Game ===
Cincinnati was well represented at the 1990 All-Star Game in Chicago. In addition to Armstrong at pitcher, Chris Sabo, Barry Larkin, Rob Dibble, and Randy Myers were reserves.

=== The Nasty Boys ===
Another new face in the Reds locker room was Randy Myers. He was acquired from the New York Mets for closer John Franco, and became part of the Nasty Boys, along with Rob Dibble and Norm Charlton. Charlton, Dibble, and Myers combined for 44 saves (Myers with 31, Dibble with 11, and Charlton with 2). Myers would become one of the league's elite closers while being selected as an All-Star in 1990. Myers would win his second World Championship as the Reds swept the Oakland Athletics.

"The Nasty Boys — The Reds' three flame-throwing relievers, Randy Myers, Rob Dibble and Norm Charlton, emerged as arguably the deepest and most talented late-inning pitchers in postseason history." — John Erardi and John Fay, The Cincinnati Enquirer

=== Season standings ===
NL West
Team	W	L	Pct.	GB	Home	Road
Cincinnati Reds	91	71	.562	—	46‍–‍35	45‍–‍36
Los Angeles Dodgers	86	76	.531	5	47‍–‍34	39‍–‍42
San Francisco Giants	85	77	.525	6	49‍–‍32	36‍–‍45
Houston Astros	75	87	.463	16	49‍–‍32	26‍–‍55
San Diego Padres	75	87	.463	16	37‍–‍44	38‍–‍43
Atlanta Braves	65	97	.401	26	37‍–‍44	28‍–‍53

=== Record vs. opponents ===
1990 National League record Sources:
Team	ATL	CHC	CIN	HOU	LAD	MON	NYM	PHI	PIT	SD	SF	STL
Atlanta	—	6–6	8–10	5–13	6–12	6–6	4–8	5–7	5–7	8–10	5–13	7–5
Chicago	6–6	—	4–8	6–6	3–9	11–7	9–9	11–7	4–14	8–4	7–5	8–10
Cincinnati	10–8	8–4	—	11–7	9–9	9–3	6–6	7–5	6–6	9–9	7–11	9–3
Houston	13–5	6–6	7–11	—	9–9	5–7	5–7	5–7	5–7	4–14	10–8	6–6
Los Angeles	12–6	9–3	9–9	9–9	—	6–6	5–7	8–4	4–8	9–9	8–10	7–5
Montreal	6–6	7–11	3–9	7–5	6–6	—	8–10	10–8	13–5	7–5	7–5	11–7
New York	8–4	9–9	6–6	7–5	7–5	10–8	—	10–8	10–8	5–7	7–5	12–6
Philadelphia	7-5	7–11	5–7	7–5	4–8	8–10	8–10	—	6–12	7–5	8–4	10–8
Pittsburgh	7–5	14–4	6–6	7–5	8–4	5–13	8–10	12–6	—	10–2	8–4	10–8
San Diego	10–8	4–8	9–9	14–4	9–9	5–7	7–5	5–7	2–10	—	7–11	3–9
San Francisco	13–5	5–7	11–7	8–10	10–8	5–7	5–7	4–8	4–8	11–7	—	9–3
St. Louis	5–7	10–8	3–9	6–6	5–7	7–11	6–12	8–10	8–10	9–3	3–9	—

=== Notable transactions ===
- June 4, 1990: 1990 Major League Baseball draft
  - Dan Wilson was drafted by the Reds in the 1st round.
  - John Roper was drafted by the Reds in the 12th round.
- June 9, 1990: Ron Robinson was traded by the Cincinnati Reds with Bob Sebra to the Milwaukee Brewers for Billy Bates and Glenn Braggs.
- June 18, 1990: Rolando Roomes was selected off waivers by the Montreal Expos from the Cincinnati Reds.
- August 24, 1990: Ken Griffey, Sr. was released by the Reds.
- August 30, 1990: Bill Doran was traded by the Houston Astros to the Cincinnati Reds for players to be named later.
- September 7, 1990: Butch Henry was sent by the Cincinnati Reds to the Houston Astros to complete an earlier deal made on August 30, 1990. Catcher Terry McGriff was also sent by the Cincinnati Reds to complete the deal.

=== Roster ===
1990 Cincinnati Reds
Roster
Pitchers: 40 Jack Armstrong; 48 Tim Birtsas; 38 Keith Brown; 32 Tom Browning; 37 Norm Charlton; 49 Rob Dibble; 59 Kip Gross; 45 Chris Hammond; 20 Danny Jackson; 43 Tim Layana; 42 Rick Mahler; 33 Gino Minutelli; 28 Randy Myers; 27 José Rijo; 33 Ron Robinson; 56 Rosario Rodríguez; 47 Scott Scudder	Catchers: 8 Terry McGriff; 9 Joe Oliver; 34 Jeff Reed; 55 Glenn Sutko; 8 Alex Treviño; Infielders: 12 Billy Bates; 25 Todd Benzinger; 19 Bill Doran; 7 Mariano Duncan; 30 Ken Griffey; 11 Barry Larkin; 26 Terry Lee; 23 Hal Morris; 16 Ron Oester; 10 Luis Quiñones; 17 Chris Sabo	Outfielders: 15 Glenn Braggs; 44 Eric Davis; 22 Billy Hatcher; 21 Paul O'Neill; 36 Rolando Roomes; 29 Herm Winningham; Other batters: 12 Paul Noce	Manager: 41 Lou Piniella; Coaches: 4 Jackie Moore (Bench); 24 Tony Pérez (Hitting/First Base); 2 Sam Perlozzo (Third Base); 3 Larry Rothschild (Bullpen); 35 Stan Williams (Pitching)

=== Opening Day Lineup ===
Opening Day Starters
#	Name	Position
17	Chris Sabo	3B
22	Billy Hatcher	LF
11	Barry Larkin	SS
44	Eric Davis	CF
21	Paul O'Neill	RF
25	Todd Benzinger	1B
9	Joe Oliver	C
7	Mariano Duncan	2B
32	Tom Browning	P

== Player stats ==
= Indicates team leader

=== Batting ===
==== Starters by position ====
Note: Pos = Position; G = Games played; AB = At bats; H = Hits; Avg. = Batting average; HR = Home runs; RBI = Runs batted in

Pos	Player	G	AB	H	Avg.	HR	RBI
C	Joe Oliver	121	364	84	.231	8	52
1B	Todd Benzinger	118	376	95	.253	5	46
2B	Mariano Duncan	125	435	133	.306	10	55
3B	Chris Sabo	148	567	153	.270	25	71
SS	Barry Larkin	158	614	185	.301	7	67
LF	Billy Hatcher	139	504	139	.276	5	25
CF	Eric Davis	127	453	118	.260	24	86
RF	Paul O'Neill	145	503	136	.270	16	78

==== Other batters ====
Note: G = Games played; AB = At bats; H = Hits; Avg. = Batting average; HR = Home runs; RBI = Runs batted in

Player	G	AB	H	Avg.	HR	RBI
Hal Morris	107	309	105	.340	7	36
Glenn Braggs	72	201	60	.299	6	28
Jeff Reed	72	175	44	.251	3	16
Herm Winningham	84	160	41	.256	3	17
Ron Oester	64	154	46	.299	0	13
Luis Quiñones	83	145	35	.241	2	17
Ken Griffey, Sr.	46	63	13	.206	1	8
Rolando Roomes	30	61	13	.213	2	7
Bill Doran	17	59	22	.373	1	5
Terry Lee	12	19	4	.211	0	3
Alex Treviño	7	7	3	.429	0	1
Billy Bates	8	5	0	.000	0	0
Terry McGriff	2	4	0	.000	0	0
Paul Noce	1	1	1	1.000	0	0
Glenn Sutko	1	1	0	.000	0	0

=== Pitching ===
==== Starting pitchers ====
Note: G = Games pitched; IP = Innings pitched; W = Wins; L = Losses; ERA = Earned run average; SO = Strikeouts

Player	G	IP	W	L	ERA	SO
Tom Browning	35	227.2	15	9	3.80	99
José Rijo	29	197.0	14	8	2.70	152
Jack Armstrong	29	166.0	12	9	3.42	110
Danny Jackson	22	117.1	6	6	3.61	76
Ron Robinson	6	31.1	2	2	4.88	14
Chris Hammond	3	11.1	0	2	6.35	4

==== Other pitchers ====
Note: G = Games pitched; IP = Innings pitched; W = Wins; L = Losses; ERA = Earned run average; SO = Strikeouts

Player	G	IP	W	L	ERA	SO
Rick Mahler	35	134.2	7	6	4.28	68
Scott Scudder	21	71.2	5	5	4.90	42

==== Relief pitchers ====
Note: G = Games pitched; W = Wins; L = Losses; SV = Saves; ERA = Earned run average; SO = Strikeouts

Player	G	W	L	SV	ERA	SO
Randy Myers	66	4	6	31	2.08	98
Rob Dibble	68	8	3	11	1.74	136
Norm Charlton	56	12	9	2	2.74	117
Tim Layana	55	5	3	2	3.49	53
Tim Birtsas	29	1	3	0	3.86	41
Rosario Rodríguez	9	0	0	0	6.10	8
Keith Brown	8	0	0	0	4.76	8
Kip Gross	5	0	0	0	4.26	3
Gino Minutelli	2	0	0	0	9.00	1

== National League Championship Series ==
=== Game 1 ===
October 4: Riverfront Stadium in Cincinnati

Team	1	2	3	4	5	6	7	8	9	R	H	E
Pittsburgh	0	0	1	2	0	0	1	0	0	4	7	1
Cincinnati	3	0	0	0	0	0	0	0	0	3	5	0
W: Bob Walk (1–0) L: Norm Charlton (0–1) S: Ted Power (1)
HR: PIT – Sid Bream (1) CIN – None
Pitchers: PIT – Walk (6), Belinda (2), Patterson (1/3), Power (2/3) CIN – Rijo (5 1/3), Charlton (2 2/3), Dibble (1)
Attendance: 52,911 Time: 2:51

=== Game 2 ===
October 5: Riverfront Stadium in Cincinnati

Team	1	2	3	4	5	6	7	8	9	R	H	E
Pittsburgh	0	0	0	0	1	0	0	0	0	1	6	0
Cincinnati	1	0	0	0	1	0	0	0	X	2	5	0
W: Tom Browning (1–0) L: Doug Drabek (0–1) S: Randy Myers (1)
HR: PIT – José Lind (1) CIN – None
Pitchers: PIT – Drabek (8) CIN – Browning (6), Dibble (1 1/3), Myers (1 2/3)
Attendance: 54,456 Time: 2:38

=== Game 3 ===
October 8: Three Rivers Stadium in Pittsburgh, Pennsylvania

Team	1	2	3	4	5	6	7	8	9	R	H	E
Cincinnati	0	2	0	0	3	0	0	0	1	6	13	1
Pittsburgh	0	0	0	2	0	0	0	1	0	3	8	0
W: Danny Jackson (1–0) L: Zane Smith (0–1) S: Randy Myers (2)
HR: PIT – None CIN – Billy Hatcher (1), Mariano Duncan (1)
Pitchers: PIT – Z. Smith (5), Landrum (1), Smiley (2), Belinda (1) CIN – Jackson (5 1/3), Dibble (1 2/3), Charlton (1), Myers (1)
Attendance: 45,611 Time: 2:51

=== Game 4 ===
October 9: Three Rivers Stadium in Pittsburgh, Pennsylvania

Team	1	2	3	4	5	6	7	8	9	R	H	E
Cincinnati	0	0	0	2	0	0	2	0	1	5	10	1
Pittsburgh	1	0	0	1	0	0	0	1	0	3	8	0
W: José Rijo (1–0) L: Bob Walk (1–1) S: Rob Dibble (1)
HR: PIT – Jay Bell (1) CIN – Paul O'Neill (1), Chris Sabo (1)
Pitchers: PIT – Walk (7), Power (2) CIN – Rijo (7), Myers (1), Dibble (1)
Attendance: 50,461 Time: 3:00

=== Game 5 ===
October 10: Three Rivers Stadium in Pittsburgh, Pennsylvania

Team	1	2	3	4	5	6	7	8	9	R	H	E
Cincinnati	1	0	0	0	0	0	0	1	0	2	7	0
Pittsburgh	2	0	0	1	0	0	0	0	X	3	6	1
W: Doug Drabek (1–1) L: Tom Browning (1–1) S: Bob Patterson (1)
HR: PIT – None CIN – None
Pitchers: PIT – Drabek (8 1/3), Patterson (2/3) CIN – Browning (5), Mahler (1 2/3), Charlton (1/3), Scudder (1)
Attendance: 48,221 Time: 2:48

=== Game 6 ===
October 12: Riverfront Stadium in Cincinnati

Team	1	2	3	4	5	6	7	8	9	R	H	E
Pittsburgh	0	0	0	0	1	0	0	0	0	1	1	3
Cincinnati	1	0	0	0	0	0	1	0	X	2	9	0
W: Norm Charlton (1–1) L: Zane Smith (0–2) S: Randy Myers (3)
HR: PIT – None CIN – None
Pitchers: PIT – Power (2 1/3), Z. Smith (4), Belinda (2/3), Landrum (1) CIN – Jackson (6), Charlton (1), Myers (2)
Attendance: 56,079 Time: 2:57

== World Series ==
The World Series between the Oakland Athletics and the Reds featured friends at the managerial level. Athletics manager Tony La Russa and Reds manager Lou Piniella were old friends and teammates from their Tampa American Legion Post 248 team.

Cincinnati Reds owner Marge Schott, who was drunk at the time, made a major verbal slip-up when she dedicated the 1990 World Series to "our women and men in the Far East" (Schott meant to say Middle East). In the first inning of Game 1, Reds center fielder Eric Davis hit a home run in left center that nearly hit the CBS television studio where anchor Pat O'Brien was sitting.

Also in Game 1, Billy Hatcher helped out offensively in a big way by starting his streak of 7 straight hits in the series (after a walk in the 1st). José Rijo settled in after the early lead and cruised to a surprise Cincinnati victory. The following day, the headline of the Cincinnati Post newspaper captured the city's surprise with the headline, "DAVIS STUNS GOLIATH."

During Game 2, Reds pitcher Tom Browning's pregnant wife Debbie went into labor during the game. Debbie left her seat in the fifth inning to drive herself to the hospital. As the game went on, the Reds wanted Browning ready to pitch just in case the game went well into extra innings. Thinking that Browning was en route to a nearby hospital, the Reds had their radio broadcaster Marty Brennaman put out an All Points Bulletin on Browning, a bulletin that was picked up by Tim McCarver on CBS television, who passed it along in the ninth inning.

Game 4 was a pitchers' duel between Dave Stewart and José Rijo (the Game 1 starters) that eventually culminated in the Reds sweeping the series. The A's got on the board in the first when Willie McGee doubled and Carney Lansford singled him in. The game remained 1–0 until the 8th when the Reds finally got to Stewart.

Barry Larkin singled up the middle, Herm Winningham followed with a bunt single, and Paul O'Neill reached on a throwing error by Stewart that loaded the bases. Glen Braggs's groundout and Hal Morris's sacrifice fly gave the Reds a precious 2–1 edge which was preserved by both Rijo, who at one point retired 20 straight batters. Randy Myers, one of the Nasty Boys, appeared in relief and got the final two outs.

The 1990 World Series would be the Reds 5th championship but would also be remembered as one of the biggest upsets in baseball history. Until 2020, this was the last World Series to be scheduled to begin play on a Tuesday, and the only since 1984. The schedule called for the seven-game series to be held Tue-Wed, Fri-Sat-Sun, Tue-Wed. Games 5, 6, and 7, however were not necessary.

=== Highlights ===
The three primary members of the bullpen; Norm Charlton, Randy Myers, and Rob Dibble (who threw a fastball in excess of 99 mph) were known as the "Nasty Boys" – and wouldn't let the A's score against them in nearly nine innings of work. Media talk of a forthcoming A's dynasty led Reds fans to call their own team the "dyNASTY."

Reds outfielder Billy Hatcher set a World Series record with seven consecutive hits, going 3-3 in the Game 1, then going 4-4 in Game 2 In addition, Hatcher's .750 batting average, (9 for 12), broke a mark for a four-game World Series that was previously set by Babe Ruth (.625 in 1928). Both records still stand as of 2024.

Cincinnati Reds' pitcher José Rijo became the second Dominican born player to earn World Series MVP honors, thanks to his 2 wins in the series, where he did not let the A's score a run, ending with a series ERA of 0.59. The first Dominican born to earn World Series MVP honors was Pedro Guerrero of the Los Angeles Dodgers.

=== Matchups ===
==== Game 1 ====
October 16, 1990, at Riverfront Stadium in Cincinnati

Team	1	2	3	4	5	6	7	8	9	R	H	E
Oakland	0	0	0	0	0	0	0	0	0	0	9	1
Cincinnati	2	0	2	0	3	0	0	0	X	7	10	0
W: José Rijo (1–0) L: Dave Stewart (0–1)
HR: CIN – Eric Davis (1)

==== Game 2 ====
October 17, 1990, at Riverfront Stadium, in Cincinnati

Team	1	2	3	4	5	6	7	8	9	10	R	H	E
Oakland	1	0	3	0	0	0	0	0	0	0	4	10	2
Cincinnati	2	0	0	1	0	0	0	1	0	1	5	14	2
W: Rob Dibble (1–0) L: Dennis Eckersley (0–1)
HR: OAK – José Canseco (1)

==== Game 3 ====
October 19, 1990, at Oakland–Alameda County Coliseum in Oakland, California

Team	1	2	3	4	5	6	7	8	9	R	H	E
Cincinnati	0	1	7	0	0	0	0	0	0	8	14	1
Oakland	0	2	1	0	0	0	0	0	0	3	7	1
W: Tom Browning (1–0) L: Mike Moore (0–1)
HR: CIN – Chris Sabo 2 (2) OAK – Harold Baines (1), Rickey Henderson (1)

==== Game 4 ====
October 20, 1990, at Oakland–Alameda County Coliseum in Oakland, California

mlb.com coverage of Game 4

Team	1	2	3	4	5	6	7	8	9	R	H	E
Cincinnati	0	0	0	0	0	0	0	2	0	2	7	1
Oakland	1	0	0	0	0	0	0	0	0	1	2	1
W: José Rijo (2–0) L: Dave Stewart (0–2) S: Randy Myers (1)

=== Composite Box ===
1990 World Series (4–0): Cincinnati Reds (N.L.) over Oakland Athletics (A.L.)

Team	1	2	3	4	5	6	7	8	9	10	R	H	E
Cincinnati Reds	4	1	9	1	3	0	0	3	0	1	22	45	4
Oakland Athletics	2	2	4	0	0	0	0	0	0	0	8	28	5
Total Attendance: 208,544 Average Attendance: 52,136
Winning Player's Share: – $112,534, Losing Player's Share – $86,961 *Includes Playoffs and World Series

== Awards and honors ==
- Jack Armstrong, Pitcher of the Month Award, May
- Rob Dibble, Relief Pitcher and Randy Myers, Relief Pitcher, NLCS MVP
- Billy Hatcher, Outfield, Babe Ruth Award
- Billy Hatcher, Highest Batting Average in a World Series
- Barry Larkin, Shortstop, National League Silver Slugger Award
- José Rijo, Pitcher, World Series MVP

All-Star Game

- Jack Armstrong, pitcher, starter
- Chris Sabo, third base, starter
- Rob Dibble, relief pitcher, reserve
- Barry Larkin, shortstop, reserve
- Randy Myers, relief pitcher, reserve

== Farm system ==
Level	Team	League	Manager
AAA	Nashville Sounds	American Association	Pete Mackanin
AA	Chattanooga Lookouts	Southern League	Jim Tracy
A	Cedar Rapids Reds	Midwest League	Gary Denbo
A	Charleston Wheelers	South Atlantic League	Dave Miley
Rookie	GCL Reds	Gulf Coast League	Sam Mejías
Rookie	Billings Mustangs	Pioneer League	Gerry Groninger

LEAGUE CHAMPIONS: Charleston
