= Bob Quinn (baseball, born 1936) =

American professional baseball executive

- Born: 1936 (age 89–90)
- Occupation: Baseball executive
- Known for: GM for: New York Yankees (1988–1989); Cincinnati Reds (1989–1992); San Francisco Giants (1992–1996)
- Father: John J. Quinn

Robert E. Quinn (born 1936) is an American former professional baseball executive. Quinn spent almost 30 years in senior front office positions in Major League Baseball and worked as the general manager of three clubs: the New York Yankees (June 8, 1988 – October 12, 1989), Cincinnati Reds (October 13, 1989 – end of the 1992 season) and San Francisco Giants (December 1, 1992 – September 30, 1996). He was the general manager of the 1990 World Series champion Cincinnati Reds.

== Family ==
Quinn is a third-generation member of a family involved in baseball management since the turn of the 20th century. His grandfather J.A. Robert Quinn at one time was an owner of the Boston Red Sox and Boston Braves and general manager of the St. Louis Browns and Brooklyn Dodgers. His father, John J. Quinn, was GM of the Braves in Boston and Milwaukee and the Philadelphia Phillies between 1945 and 1972. A brother-in-law, Roland Hemond, was also a longtime baseball executive and general manager of the Chicago White Sox and Baltimore Orioles. And Quinn's son, also named Bob, served from 2003 until early 2018 as the Milwaukee Brewers' executive vice president, finance and administration, and currently, he serves as part of the Milwaukee Brewers ownership team, and is the current President of the Brewers affiliate club the Wilson Warbirds, the fourth generation of the Quinn family to work in senior management positions in professional baseball. Quinn's grandchildren Collin, Carolyn, and Kathryn comprise the fifth generation of the Quinn family to work in baseball. Collin serves as an analyst in the Milwaukee Brewers' financial/accounting department, Carolyn is Manager of Partnerships for the Brewers' affiliate club, the Wilson Warbirds, and Kathryn has held positions across multiple professional sports organizations, including the Milwaukee Brewers.

Robert E. Quinn grew up in Newton, Massachusetts, and was 17 when he moved with his family to Milwaukee with the Braves in 1953. He graduated from Marquette University in 1958 and began his baseball career in the Braves' and Phillies' minor league organizations. In 1967, he helped establish the Reading Phillies as Philadelphia's Eastern League farm team, winning The Sporting News' Minor League Executive of the Year Award as a first-year general manager there. Reading celebrated its 50th straight year as the Phillies' Double-A affiliate in 2016. Quinn then helped to re-establish a minor league franchise in Omaha in 1969–70 as the first front-office boss of the Omaha Royals of the Triple-A American Association. That franchise celebrated its 50th consecutive season as the Kansas City Royals' top affiliate in 2018.

Quinn joined Milwaukee's current Major League team, the Brewers, as their farm system director in 1971. In 1973, he accepted a similar post with the Cleveland Indians, and spent over a dozen years working as the Indians' scouting and player development boss. He was promoted to vice president in 1981.

== Career as general manager ==
=== New York Yankees ===
In 1987, Quinn joined the Yankees as vice president, baseball administration. In May 1988, the Bombers' incumbent GM, Lou Piniella, turned in his resignation; on June 8, Quinn was named his successor. Not even two weeks into his tenure, Quinn faced a mutiny from the manager he inherited, Billy Martin. Quinn had activated a catcher, Don Slaught, from the disabled list based on input from the Yankees' medical staff. Martin disagreed vehemently with the Slaught decision and announced he would boycott the team's management meetings. Owner George Steinbrenner did not intercede on Martin's behalf, and Martin was replaced by Piniella as manager on June 23 with the Yankees 40–28 and 2½ games behind the Detroit Tigers in the American League East Division.

But the Yankees went only 45–48 under Piniella to finish fifth in 1988, then posted a 74–87 mark in 1989, their first losing season since 1982. The 1989 campaign also saw Steinbrenner continue to play a dominant role in baseball decision-making, and muddy his front office's chain of command by handing significant authority to Syd Thrift, a former Pittsburgh Pirates executive, whom he named senior vice president, baseball operations, in March, and George Bradley, the club's player development director. On October 12, Quinn resigned.

=== Cincinnati Reds ===
Quinn immediately succeeded Murray Cook as general manager of the Cincinnati Reds, and he proceeded to hire Piniella as his field manager. The 1989 season had been a disaster on and off the field: the Reds finished 75–87 and in fifth place in a year marred by the gambling allegations against and the suspension and disbarment of manager Pete Rose. During that offseason, Quinn acquired fireballing relief pitcher Randy Myers and rookie first baseman Hal Morris. In 1990, Morris posted a .340 batting average and finished third in the National League Rookie of the Year balloting. Myers teamed with Rob Dibble and Norm Charlton to form The Nasty Boys, a formidable bullpen trio.

The 1990 Reds won 91 games and the National League West Division championship, defeated the Pittsburgh Pirates in six games in the NLCS (with Morris hitting .417), and then swept the favored Oakland Athletics in the World Series behind The Nasty Boys' dominant relief work. Quinn was named "Executive of the Year" by The Sporting News in recognition of Cincinnati's 1990 turnaround.

The Reds suffered a down season in 1991, falling to fifth place, but recovered to win 90 games in 1992, although they finished eight games behind the division champion Atlanta Braves. But there was turbulence in the Cincinnati front office. Owner Marge Schott cut Quinn's scouting and farm system budget, then fired him at the end of the 1992 season.

=== San Francisco Giants ===
Two months later, Quinn became general manager of the Giants at one of the turning points in their history in the San Francisco Bay Area. The 1992 Giants finished 72–90, 26 games behind the Braves (and 18 games in arrears of Quinn's Reds) and had drawn 1.56 million fans to Candlestick Park—next to last in the National League. For much of the season, it appeared that the Giants were about to move to Tampa–Saint Petersburg after owner Bob Lurie agreed to sell them to Florida businessman Vince Naimoli. But in November, the National League rejected the Tampa deal, and Lurie instead sold the Giants to a Bay Area investment group headed by Peter Magowan. The new owners announced the team was staying in San Francisco, hired Quinn as general manager on December 1, 1992, signed free agent superstar left fielder Barry Bonds on December 9, and promoted Dusty Baker to manager on December 16. The 1993 Giants proceeded to improve by 31 games, going 103–59, Bonds won the NL Most Valuable Player Award, and attendance jumped to 2.6 million. However, the Giants finished a game behind the Braves in the NL West and did not qualify for the postseason in the last pre-wild card full season in Major League Baseball.

Three sub-.500 seasons followed the Giants' 1993 breakout year, and at the close of 1996, Quinn stepped down as general manager. His successor was assistant general manager/director of player personnel Brian Sabean, the former director of scouting of the Yankees who had followed Quinn to the Giants' organization in 1993. Under Sabean, GM from 1997 through 2014, the Giants would win three World Series championships and four National League pennants. Under Magowan they moved into AT&T Park in 2000 and solidified their popularity in the Bay Area.

Quinn remained with the Giants as a vice president and senior adviser through 1997. He currently resides in Scottsdale, Arizona. Tommy John described him as having a "soft-spoken manner."
