= 1990 National League Championship Series =

22nd edition of Major League Baseball's National League Championship Series

Team (Wins)	Managers	Season
Cincinnati Reds (4)	Lou Piniella	91–71, .562, GA: 5
Pittsburgh Pirates (2)	Jim Leyland	95–67, .586, GA: 4
- Dates: October 4–12
- MVP: Rob Dibble and Randy Myers (Cincinnati)
- Umpires: Harry Wendelstedt; John McSherry; Paul Runge; Dutch Rennert; Jerry Crawford; Gerry Davis

Broadcast
- Television: CBS
- TV announcers: Jack Buck and Tim McCarver
- Radio: CBS
- Radio announcers: John Rooney and Jerry Coleman

The 1990 National League Championship Series was a best-of-seven playoff series in Major League Baseball’s 1990 postseason played between the Cincinnati Reds (91–71) and the Pittsburgh Pirates (95–67). It was the first playoff appearance for both teams since 1979 and the fifth NLCS meeting overall with Cincinnati winning the pennant over Pittsburgh in 1970, 1972, and 1975 while Pittsburgh won over Cincinnati in 1979.

The Reds won the series, 4–2, and eventually went on to sweep the defending World Champion Oakland Athletics in the World Series. This was the only NLCS during the 1990s that did not feature the Atlanta Braves and was the first of four straight to feature either the Philadelphia Phillies or the Pittsburgh Pirates.

Between Game 2 (in Cincinnati) and Game 3 (in Pittsburgh), the teams took two days off instead of the usual one. That Sunday, October 7, the Pittsburgh Steelers needed to use Three Rivers Stadium for their scheduled game against the San Diego Chargers, so Game 3 (and by extension, the rest of the series) was pushed back a day.

== Summary ==
=== Cincinnati Reds vs. Pittsburgh Pirates ===
Cincinnati won the series, 4–2.

Game	Date	Score	Location	Time	Attendance
1	October 4	Pittsburgh Pirates – 4, Cincinnati Reds – 3	Riverfront Stadium	2:51	52,911
2	October 5	Pittsburgh Pirates – 1, Cincinnati Reds – 2	Riverfront Stadium	2:38	54,456
3	October 8	Cincinnati Reds – 6, Pittsburgh Pirates – 3	Three Rivers Stadium	2:51	45,611
4	October 9	Cincinnati Reds – 5, Pittsburgh Pirates – 3	Three Rivers Stadium	3:00	50,461
5	October 10	Cincinnati Reds – 2, Pittsburgh Pirates – 3	Three Rivers Stadium	2:48	48,221
6	October 12	Pittsburgh Pirates – 1, Cincinnati Reds – 2	Riverfront Stadium	2:57	56,079

== Game summaries ==
=== Game 1 ===
Thursday, October 4, 1990 (8:30PM EDT) at Riverfront Stadium in Cincinnati, Ohio

Team	1	2	3	4	5	6	7	8	9	R	H	E
Pittsburgh	0	0	1	2	0	0	1	0	0	4	7	1
Cincinnati	3	0	0	0	0	0	0	0	0	3	5	0
WP: Bob Walk (1–0) LP: Norm Charlton (0–1) Sv: Ted Power (1); Home runs: PIT: Sid Bream (1); CIN: None

The Pirates took the first game of the LCS with a 4-3 victory. The game-winning run scored in the 7th when Andy Van Slyke hit a routine inning-ending flyout that was misjudged by Eric Davis in left-field, scoring Gary Redus.

Bob Walk was the starting pitcher for Pittsburgh and José Rijo was on the mound for the Reds. The Reds had two doubles in the bottom half of the first inning and scored three runs. These would prove to be the only runs they could bring across the plate for the entire game. For Pittsburgh, Sid Bream would hit a two-run home run in the fourth inning to tie the game. The key Pirate play to seal the game was throwing out pinch-runner Billy Bates, the trailing runner at the back end of a double steal in the ninth inning, to get the second out. Pittsburgh took the series lead, one game to none and claimed home field advantage.

=== Game 2 ===
Friday, October 5, 1990 (3:15PM EDT) at Riverfront Stadium in Cincinnati, Ohio

Team	1	2	3	4	5	6	7	8	9	R	H	E
Pittsburgh	0	0	0	0	1	0	0	0	0	1	6	0
Cincinnati	1	0	0	0	1	0	0	0	X	2	5	0
WP: Tom Browning (1–0) LP: Doug Drabek (0–1) Sv: Randy Myers (1); Home runs: PIT: José Lind (1); CIN: None

Doug Drabek, the National League Cy Young Award winner for 1990 took the mound against Tom Browning for a weekday afternoon Game 2. Cincinnati again scored in the first inning when Barry Larkin walked, stole second, went to third on a hard single by Herm Winningham and scored on a single by Paul O'Neill. The Pirates tied it in the fifth when José Lind, better known for defense, hit a homer.

The Pirates appeared ready to take the lead in the sixth when Andy Van Slyke singled and went to second on a single by Bobby Bonilla. With two on and nobody out, Pirates slugger Barry Bonds came up with a chance for a big inning. Bonds popped out to deep right, and Van Slyke attempted to advance. But Paul O'Neill threw a perfect strike to Chris Sabo who tagged Van Slyke for a 9–5 double play.

The Reds regained the lead in the fifth when Winningham reached on a fielder's choice, stole second, and scored on O'Neill's drive to left center that hit the wall after barely avoiding Bonds' glove. Drabek went the distance but got the loss. Browning got the win and Randy Myers the save. Barry Larkin's stop and throw on a sharp grounder by Bonds up the middle squelched a potential rally with none out in the ninth.

=== Game 3 ===
Monday, October 8, 1990 (3:20PM EDT) at Three Rivers Stadium in Pittsburgh, Pennsylvania

Team	1	2	3	4	5	6	7	8	9	R	H	E
Cincinnati	0	2	0	0	3	0	0	0	1	6	13	1
Pittsburgh	0	0	0	2	0	0	0	1	0	3	8	0
WP: Danny Jackson (1–0) LP: Zane Smith (0–1) Sv: Randy Myers (2); Home runs: CIN: Billy Hatcher (1), Mariano Duncan (1); PIT: None

This was a weekday afternoon game, and for the first time in history, there were two scheduled off days between games. This set-up seemed to help Pittsburgh as it would allow them to have Drabek for game seven if necessary. Danny Jackson squared off against Zane Smith. But it was Mariano Duncan who stole the show.

In the second, Joe Oliver singled and Billy Hatcher homered to give the Reds a 2–0 lead. The Pirates tied it in the fourth when Jay Bell doubled, Andy Van Slyke singled to score Bell, and Van Slyke scored on Carmelo Martínez's double. In the fifth, Billy Hatcher doubled, Larkin singled, and Duncan hit a three-run homer to give the Reds a 5–2 lead. In the bottom of eighth, the Pirates got a run back when Barry Bonds singled, went to second on a walk, and scored on Mariano Duncan's throwing error to make it 5–3. In the ninth, the Reds got the run back when Oliver singled and Billy Bates ran for him. Bates eventually scored on a Duncan single (his fourth RBI of the game). The game ended with a Reds victory, 6–3, allowing them to reclaim home field advantage and to take a two games to one lead in the NLCS.

=== Game 4 ===
Tuesday, October 9, 1990 (8:30PM EDT) at Three Rivers Stadium in Pittsburgh, Pennsylvania

Team	1	2	3	4	5	6	7	8	9	R	H	E
Cincinnati	0	0	0	2	0	0	2	0	1	5	10	1
Pittsburgh	1	0	0	1	0	0	0	1	0	3	8	0
WP: José Rijo (1–0) LP: Bob Walk (1–1) Sv: Rob Dibble (1); Home runs: CIN: Paul O'Neill (1), Chris Sabo (1); PIT: Jay Bell (1)

Game 4 would be a rematch of Game 1 starters Jose Rijo and Bob Walk. The Pirates would grab the first lead of the game (for the only time in the series) in the opening frame when Wally Backman doubled to left and scored on a Van Slyke ground out. The Reds took the lead in the fourth when O'Neill belted a shot and Sabo followed up singles by Eric Davis and Hal Morris with a sac fly. Bream would hurt Rijo again (as he had in Game 1) in the bottom half of the inning when he drilled a double to left center that scored Van Slyke.

Chris Sabo untied the game in the seventh when he golfed a hanging curveball by Walk into the left field stands for a two-run homer. With no outs in the eighth, Jay Bell hit a home run that knocked Rijo out of the game and cut the lead to 4–3. Piniella called on Myers and two batters later Bonilla hammered another ball that hit high off the center-field fence and out of the reach of the leaping Billy Hatcher. As Bonilla rounded second and tried to stretch the hit into a triple, left fielder Eric Davis ran out toward center, fielded the carom and threw a one hop strike to Sabo at third; gunning down the aggressive Bonilla for the second out of the inning, squelching the would be rally and potential tying run. The play seemed to deflate the Pirates as they would not score again in the game.

The Nasty Boys continued their dominance through the last innings while the Reds offense tacked on an insurance run in the top of the ninth, making it 5–3. Dibble got the save and up until that point had pitched in all four games, tossed five innings with no hits allowed and ten strikeouts.

=== Game 5 ===
Wednesday, October 10, 1990 (8:25PM EDT) at Three Rivers Stadium in Pittsburgh, Pennsylvania

Team	1	2	3	4	5	6	7	8	9	R	H	E
Cincinnati	1	0	0	0	0	0	0	1	0	2	7	0
Pittsburgh	2	0	0	1	0	0	0	0	X	3	6	1
WP: Doug Drabek (1–1) LP: Tom Browning (1–1) Sv: Bob Patterson (1)

Game 5 saw the Pirates bring back their ace Doug Drabek to keep the season alive. Barry Larkin got the Reds started in the first when he doubled down the left-field line and scored on Winningham's sac fly to right. In the bottom of the first, Reds starter Tom Browning hit Jay Bell and then surrendered a gapper to right-center by Van Slyke that hopped over Paul O'Neill's glove for an RBI triple. Bonilla walked and Bonds hit into a 3–6 force play scoring Van Slyke to make it 2–1 Bucs. In the fourth, Pittsburgh added another run when Bonds walked, went to third on an R. J. Reynolds hit, and scored on a sac fly by Don Slaught. Drabek's gutsy outing continued into the eighth until Duncan singled and Larkin smashed a double that one-hopped the left field fence. Up 3–2 going to the ninth, the Pirates were desperately clinging to the slim lead and the season. O'Neill opened the frame with a single to center. Eric Davis then hit a ground ball to deep third that ricocheted off the third base bag for a hit. Morris bunted the runners over to second and third which made Leyland decide on intentionally walking Sabo to load the bases. Bob Patterson relieved Drabek and got Jeff Reed to hit into a 5–4–3 double play started by Bobby Bonilla to end the game.

=== Game 6 ===
Friday, October 12, 1990 (8:20PM EDT) at Riverfront Stadium in Cincinnati, Ohio

Team	1	2	3	4	5	6	7	8	9	R	H	E
Pittsburgh	0	0	0	0	1	0	0	0	0	1	1	3
Cincinnati	1	0	0	0	0	0	1	0	X	2	9	0
WP: Norm Charlton (1–1) LP: Zane Smith (0–2) Sv: Randy Myers (3)

This game was famous for Pittsburgh manager Jim Leyland starting a set-up man, Ted Power, as an opener in order to keep the Reds from employing their successful platoon. The strategy worked in that it held the Reds to only two runs, but the Pirates' offense managed only one hit themselves. The Reds pushed across a run in the first: Barry Larkin led off with slowly-hit infield single (on which shortstop Jay Bell double-clutched, delaying his throw) before stealing second and advancing to third on catcher Don Slaught's throwing error into center field. After a groundout and a walk, Larkin scored on Eric Davis' potential double play ball that became an RBI groundout when second baseman Jose Lind mishandled an attempt to turn it. Power pitched 2 1/3 innings prior to giving way to lefty Zane Smith in the third inning; Smith kept Cincinnati scoreless through the sixth while the Pirates tied the score in the fifth on Barry Bonds' walk and Carmelo Martinez's RBI double, the Pirates' only hit of the game, and the first baserunners of the game allowed by Reds starter Danny Jackson. However, after pitching out of a jam in the sixth, Smith allowed three singles in the seventh, culminating in Luis Quiñones knocking in Ron Oester to take the lead. The 2–1 score held into the ninth, when an over-the-fence catch by right fielder Glenn Braggs robbed Martinez of a two-run homer to help preserve the win for the Reds. The Reds took the series, four games to two, and also their first pennant since 1976. To date, this is the Reds' most recent pennant.

== Composite box ==
1990 NLCS (4–2): Cincinnati Reds over Pittsburgh Pirates

Team	1	2	3	4	5	6	7	8	9	R	H	E
Cincinnati Reds	6	2	0	2	4	0	3	1	2	20	49	2
Pittsburgh Pirates	3	0	1	6	2	0	1	2	0	15	36	5
Total attendance: 307,739 Average attendance: 51,290

== Aftermath ==
Starting in the 1994 season, Major League Baseball realigned by creating a third division in each both leagues as part of their new collective bargaining agreement. The Pirates and Reds would respectively end their 24-year stays in the National League East and National League West and join each other in the newly created National League Central, continuing their rivalry that started in the 1970s.

This would be the start of three straight NL Championship Series appearances for the Pirates, all which ended in a series loss.

The Pirates and Reds sixth postseason meeting came 23 years later in the 2013 National League Wild Card Game, which the Pirates won 6–2. 2013 was the Pirates first winning season since 1992, ending the longest stretch of losing seasons (20 seasons) in North American professional sports history.

In 1990, Jim Leyland's decision to start a reliever to off set the Reds' platoon was foreign concept in Major League Baseball, but it would become the norm in the sport some 25–30 years later. In 2018, some MLB teams began experimenting with an opener – a pitcher who is normally a reliever that starts the game for an inning or two before yielding to someone who would normally be a starter. Sometimes the manager replaces an opener with a series of other relievers who would only pitch one or two innings in a game, usually due to injury or fatigue affecting the team's starters or other strategical reasons; this approach became known as a bullpen game.
