= 1991 Major League Baseball All-Star Game =

1991 American baseball competition

	1	2	3	4	5	6	7	8	9	R	H	E
National League	1	0	0	1	0	0	0	0	0	2	10	1
American League	0	0	3	0	0	0	1	0	X	4	8	0
- Date: July 9, 1991
- Venue: SkyDome
- City: Toronto, Ontario, Canada
- Managers: Lou Piniella (CIN); Tony La Russa (OAK)
- MVP: Cal Ripken Jr. (BAL)
- Attendance: 52,383
- Ceremonial first pitch: Ferguson Jenkins
- Television: CBS, CTV
- TV announcers: Jack Buck and Tim McCarver
- Radio: CBS
- Radio announcers: John Rooney, Jerry Coleman and Johnny Bench

The 1991 Major League Baseball All-Star Game was the 62nd playing of the midsummer classic between the all-stars of the American League (AL) and National League (NL), the two leagues comprising Major League Baseball. The game was held on July 9, 1991, at SkyDome in Toronto, the home of the Toronto Blue Jays of the American League. It was only the second time that the game was played outside the United States, as the National League's Montreal Expos hosted the 1982 Midsummer Classic at Olympic Stadium in Montreal, Quebec. This was also the only All-Star Game to be awarded by Commissioner A. Bartlett Giamatti, who awarded the game to the Blue Jays on Canada Day 1989, exactly two months before Giamatti's death at age 51 from a massive heart attack.

The game resulted in the American League defeating the National League 4-2. Both the winning and losing pitchers represented the Canadian teams; the Blue Jays' Jimmy Key earned the win while the Expos' Dennis Martínez was given the loss.

As of 2025, this is the most recent All-Star Game to be hosted by the Blue Jays in Toronto or held outside the United States.

== Rosters ==
Players in italics have since been inducted into the National Baseball Hall of Fame.

=== American League ===
Starters
Position	Player	Team	All-Star Games
P	Jack Morris	Twins	5
C	Sandy Alomar Jr.	Indians	2
1B	Cecil Fielder	Tigers	2
2B	Roberto Alomar	Blue Jays	2
3B	Wade Boggs	Red Sox	7
SS	Cal Ripken Jr.	Orioles	9
OF	Ken Griffey Jr.	Mariners	2
OF	Dave Henderson	Athletics	1
OF	Rickey Henderson	Athletics	10
DH	Danny Tartabull	Royals	1

Pitchers
Position	Player	Team	All-Star Games
P	Rick Aguilera	Twins	1
P	Roger Clemens	Red Sox	4
P	Dennis Eckersley	Athletics	5
P	Scott Erickson	Twins	1
P	Bryan Harvey	Angels	1
P	Jimmy Key	Blue Jays	2
P	Mark Langston	Angels	2
P	Jack McDowell	White Sox	1
P	Jeff Reardon	Red Sox	4
P	Scott Sanderson	Yankees	1

Reserves
Position	Player	Team	All-Star Games
C	Carlton Fisk	White Sox	11
1B	Mark McGwire	Athletics	5
1B	Rafael Palmeiro	Rangers	2
2B	Julio Franco	Rangers	3
SS	Ozzie Guillén	White Sox	3
OF	Joe Carter	Blue Jays	1
OF	Kirby Puckett	Twins	6
OF	Rubén Sierra	Rangers	2
DH	Harold Baines	Athletics	5
DH	Paul Molitor	Brewers	4

=== National League ===
Starters
Position	Player	Team	All-Star Games
P	Tom Glavine	Braves	1
C	Benito Santiago	Padres	3
1B	Will Clark	Giants	4
2B	Ryne Sandberg	Cubs	8
3B	Chris Sabo	Reds	3
SS	Ozzie Smith	Cardinals	11
OF	Iván Calderón	Expos	1
OF	Tony Gwynn	Padres	7
OF	Andre Dawson	Cubs	8
DH	Bobby Bonilla	Pirates	4

Pitchers
Position	Player	Team	All-Star Games
P	Tom Browning	Reds	1
P	Rob Dibble	Reds	2
P	Pete Harnisch	Astros	1
P	Dennis Martínez	Expos	2
P	Mike Morgan	Dodgers	1
P	John Smiley	Pirates	1
P	Lee Smith	Cardinals	3
P	Frank Viola	Mets	3

Reserves
Position	Player	Team	All-Star Games
C	Craig Biggio	Astros	1
1B	Eddie Murray	Dodgers	8
1B	John Kruk	Phillies	1
2B	Juan Samuel	Dodgers	3
3B	Howard Johnson	Mets	2
SS	Barry Larkin	Reds	4
OF	Brett Butler	Dodgers	1
OF	Félix José	Cardinals	1
OF	Paul O'Neill	Reds	1
OF	Darryl Strawberry	Dodgers	8
OF	George Bell	Cubs	3

== Game ==
=== Umpires ===
Home Plate	Joe Brinkman (AL)
First Base	John McSherry (NL)
Second Base	Ken Kaiser (AL)
Third Base	Jim Quick (NL)
Left Field	Larry Young (AL)
Right Field	Greg Bonin (NL)

=== Starting lineups ===
National League				American League			
Order	Player	Team	Position	Order	Player	Team	Position
1	Tony Gwynn	Padres	CF	1	Rickey Henderson	Athletics	LF
2	Ryne Sandberg	Cubs	2B	2	Wade Boggs	Red Sox	3B
3	Will Clark	Giants	1B	3	Cal Ripken Jr.	Orioles	SS
4	Bobby Bonilla	Pirates	DH	4	Cecil Fielder	Tigers	1B
5	Andre Dawson	Cubs	RF	5	Danny Tartabull	Royals	DH
6	Iván Calderón	Expos	LF	6	Dave Henderson	Athletics	RF
7	Chris Sabo	Reds	3B	7	Ken Griffey Jr.	Mariners	CF
8	Benito Santiago	Padres	C	8	Sandy Alomar Jr.	Indians	C
9	Ozzie Smith	Cardinals	SS	9	Roberto Alomar	Blue Jays	2B
	Tom Glavine	Braves	P		Jack Morris	Twins	P

=== Game summary ===
Tuesday, July 9, 1991 8:35 pm (ET) at SkyDome in Toronto, Ontario
Team	1	2	3	4	5	6	7	8	9	R	H	E
National League	1	0	0	1	0	0	0	0	0	2	10	1
American League	0	0	3	0	0	0	1	0	X	4	8	0
WP: Jimmy Key (1-0) LP: Dennis Martínez (0-1) Sv: Dennis Eckersley (1); Home runs: NL: Andre Dawson (1); AL: Cal Ripken Jr. (1)
