= Tim Layana =

American baseball player (1964–1999)

- Pitcher
- Born: March 2, 1964; Inglewood, California, U.S.
- Died: June 26, 1999 (aged 35); Bakersfield, California, U.S.
- Batted: Right Threw: Right

MLB debut
- April 9, 1990, for the Cincinnati Reds

Last MLB appearance
- July 26, 1993, for the San Francisco Giants

MLB statistics
- Win–loss record: 5–5
- Earned run average: 4.56
- Strikeouts: 68
- Stats at Baseball Reference

Teams
- Cincinnati Reds (1990–1991); San Francisco Giants (1993)

Career highlights and awards
- World Series champion (1990)

Timothy Joseph Layana (March 2, 1964 – June 26, 1999) was an American professional baseball pitcher who pitched for the Cincinnati Reds and San Francisco Giants of Major League Baseball (MLB).

== Career ==
He attended Loyola High School and was a 1986 graduate of Loyola Marymount University in Los Angeles, where he established 14 LMU pitching records including victories in a season (17) and in a career (35). He led the Lions to the College World Series in 1986.

Layana was drafted by the New York Yankees in the third round of the 1986 Major League Baseball draft. He pitched four seasons in the Yankees system before being selected by the Cincinnati Reds in 1989 in the Rule 5 draft.

He made his major league debut with the Reds on April 9, 1990, in an 8–4 Reds win over the Houston Astros at the Astrodome, pitching one hitless shutout inning in relief of starter Tom Browning. He was a key cog in the Reds' 1990 bullpen which included Layana and "Nasty Boys" Rob Dibble, Randy Myers and Norm Charlton as well as relievers Tim Birtsas, Scott Scudder and Rick Mahler. That season, Layana pitched in 55 games with a 5–3 record and 3.49 earned run average in 80 innings. The Reds won the 1990 World Series, defeating the Oakland Athletics in a four-game sweep, but Layana was left off the postseason roster and did not appear in the series.

During the 1991 season for the Reds he had a record of 0–2 with a 6.97 ERA in 22 games, and he appeared in 26 games with the Reds' Double-A Nashville Sounds. He was released by the Reds before the 1992 season, during which he did not appear in the majors while a member of the Baltimore Orioles system, pitching in 41 games for the Orioles' Triple-A affiliate Rochester Red Wings. After the season, he was released and in 1993 was signed by the Giants, for whom he pitched 55 games with their Triple-A affiliate Phoenix Firebirds, but just one game in the majors, his final one in the big leagues. He continued to pitch for the Montreal Expos' AAA affiliate the Ottawa Lynx in 1994 and 1995, and played in an independent league in 1997, which was the last season of his pro career. He was baseball coach for Saint Monica Catholic High School in Santa Monica, California.

Layana died on June 26, 1999, when his SUV was broadsided by another car in Bakersfield, California, while returning from a juvenile diabetes golf fundraiser. Layana's three passengers were injured, but were all treated and released. Layana is buried in the Holy Cross Cemetery in Culver City, California.
