= Nasty Boys (Cincinnati Reds) =

Trio of baseball relief pitchers

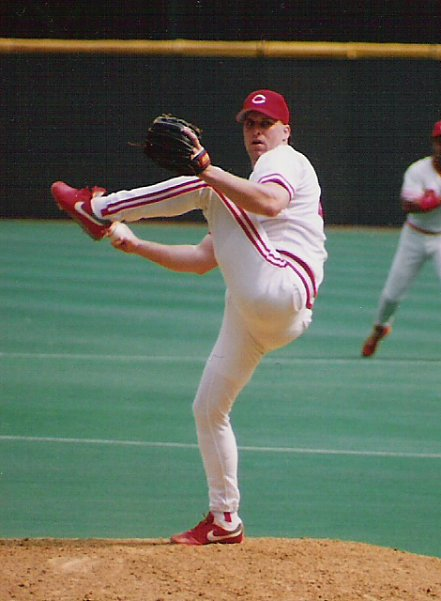

The Nasty Boys were a trio of relief pitchers from the Cincinnati Reds: Norm Charlton, Rob Dibble and Randy Myers. In 1990, the "Nasty Boys" were key figures in the Reds' charge to the World Series Championship. According to Rob Dibble, the "Nasty Boys" really was a fivesome including Tim Layana and Tim Birtsas. However, they have gone down in history as a trio.

During the 1990 Cincinnati Reds season, Charlton, Dibble, and Myers combined for 44 saves (Myers with 31, Dibble with 11, and Charlton with 2) and 351 strikeouts, although some of Charlton's 117 strikeouts came as a starter, as he was moved to the rotation late in the season.

The nickname was derived from the lyrics of the Janet Jackson song "Nasty." It was also a derivative of the Detroit Pistons "Bad Boys" name that was used during their 1989 NBA Championship season.

== 1990 World Series ==
The "Nasty Boys" pitched a combined 8 2/3 innings in the 1990 World Series and gave up no earned runs on six hits. Rob Dibble got a win in Game 2 and Randy Myers picked up one save in Game 4. Prior to the series, Myers and Dibble had shared the 1990 National League Championship Series Most Valuable Player Award.

== Aftermath ==
As it turned out, the trio would only play together for two seasons. Myers left after the 1991 season. Charlton, having played for the team since 1988, left after the 1992 season. Dibble, also a Red since 1988, left the following year. As such, none of the players were present for the next postseason appearance for the Reds, which was in 1995.

== See also ==
- 1990 National League Championship Series
- 1990 World Series
- 1990 Cincinnati Reds season
