= Rob Dibble =

American baseball player (born 1964)

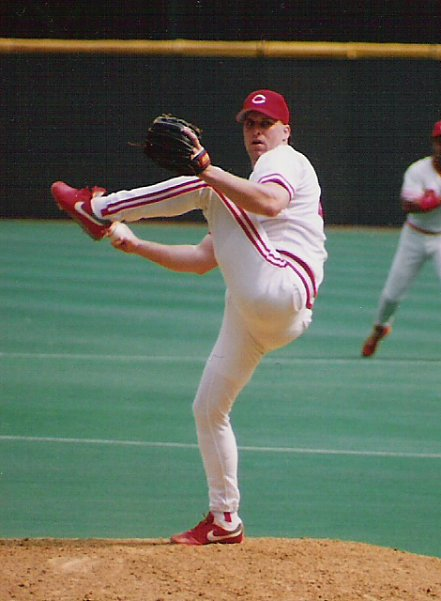
- Dibble pitching for the Cincinnati Reds in 1991
- Pitcher
- Born: January 24, 1964 (age 62); Bridgeport, Connecticut, U.S.
- Batted: Left Threw: Right

MLB debut
- June 29, 1988, for the Cincinnati Reds

Last MLB appearance
- September 30, 1995, for the Milwaukee Brewers

MLB statistics
- Win–loss record: 27–25
- Earned run average: 2.98
- Strikeouts: 645
- Saves: 89
- Stats at Baseball Reference

Teams
- Cincinnati Reds (1988–1993); Chicago White Sox (1995); Milwaukee Brewers (1995)

Career highlights and awards
- 2× All-Star (1990, 1991); World Series champion (1990); NLCS MVP (1990)

Robert Keith Dibble (born January 24, 1964) is an American former Major League Baseball (MLB) pitcher and television and radio analyst. Dibble debuted in MLB with the Cincinnati Reds in 1988 and was named to two All-Star Games with the Reds. He was the 1990 National League Championship Series Most Valuable Player en route to the team's World Series win.

After dealing with injuries and ineffectiveness, Dibble pitched for Chicago White Sox and Milwaukee Brewers in 1995. After retiring as a player, Dibble has worked as a sports television and radio broadcaster.

== Personal life ==
Dibble was born in Bridgeport, Connecticut. He attended St. Thomas School, a parochial school, and is a graduate of Southington High School in Southington, Connecticut. Dibble's father, Walt Dibble, was a longtime radio news director at WDRC and later WTIC in Hartford, Connecticut.

== Playing career ==
Dibble was drafted by the Cincinnati Reds in the first round of the second phase of the 1983 MLB draft, and he made his debut with the Reds on June 29, 1988.

On June 4, 1989, Dibble threw an immaculate inning when he struck out all three batters on nine total pitches, occurring in the eighth inning of a 5–3 win over the San Diego Padres. During his career, Dibble was known for his temper. During a game in July 1989, he hit Mets second basemen Tim Teufel in the back with a pitch; Teufel then charged the mound, causing a bench-clearing brawl.

Dibble was an MLB All-Star in 1990 and 1991, and was the 1990 NLCS Most Valuable Player (along with fellow "Nasty Boy" Randy Myers). In 1990, Dibble and the Reds won the World Series by beating the Oakland Athletics in four consecutive games.

After saving a game in April 1991 despite giving up two runs in relief, Dibble threw a baseball 400 feet into the center-field seats at Cincinnati, inadvertently striking a woman. He was also involved in a brawl in 1991 with Astros shortstop Eric Yelding. Later in the 1991 season, he threw a baseball into the back of Cubs outfielder Doug Dascenzo as he ran down the first base line and was subsequently ejected from the game.

On June 23, 1992, Dibble recorded his 500th career strikeout in fewer innings—368—than any other pitcher in modern baseball history up to that point (Aroldis Chapman later passed him). After a September 18 game saw the Reds win without needing Dibble on the mound, the post-game interview of team manager Lou Piniella led to a scuffle when Dibble disagreed with Piniella's assessment that Dibble wasn't used because of a "bad shoulder". The two shoved each other in front of cameras that saw both of them have to visit team owner Marge Schott and management to go with an apology.

Dibble, seeing the trade of co-closer Norm Charlton to Seattle as a move that essentially anointed Dibble as their primary closer, stated his desire to turn a new leaf with two goals for 1993: save 40 games and improve his reputation. On April 21, he broke his left forearm during a game and was projected to miss six weeks. He returned in late May but had a 6.48 ERA in 45 games that saw him collect 19 saves. In April of 1994, Dibble required surgery for a torn rotator cuff in his right shoulder. It was speculated at the time that he would miss three months, but he ended up missing the entire season.

Dibble signed with the Chicago White Sox before the 1995 season. The team briefly suspended him after he criticized replacement players during the ongoing strike, saying the strikebreakers were "going to be labeled like child molesters for the rest of their lives." After failing to trade him during spring training, the White Sox sent Dibble to the Triple-A Birmingham Barons, where he went 0–2 in 11 games. He then pitched 16 games for the White Sox and after being released he was picked up by the Milwaukee Brewers, where he pitched in 15 more games. His combined MLB 1995 record was 1–2 with a 7.18 ERA, walking 46 batters in 21 innings.

Dibble opted to make a comeback, signing a minor league contract on April 14, 1996, with the Florida Marlins. However, Dibble would ultimately see no game action with the Marlins or their minor league affiliates.

== Broadcasting career ==
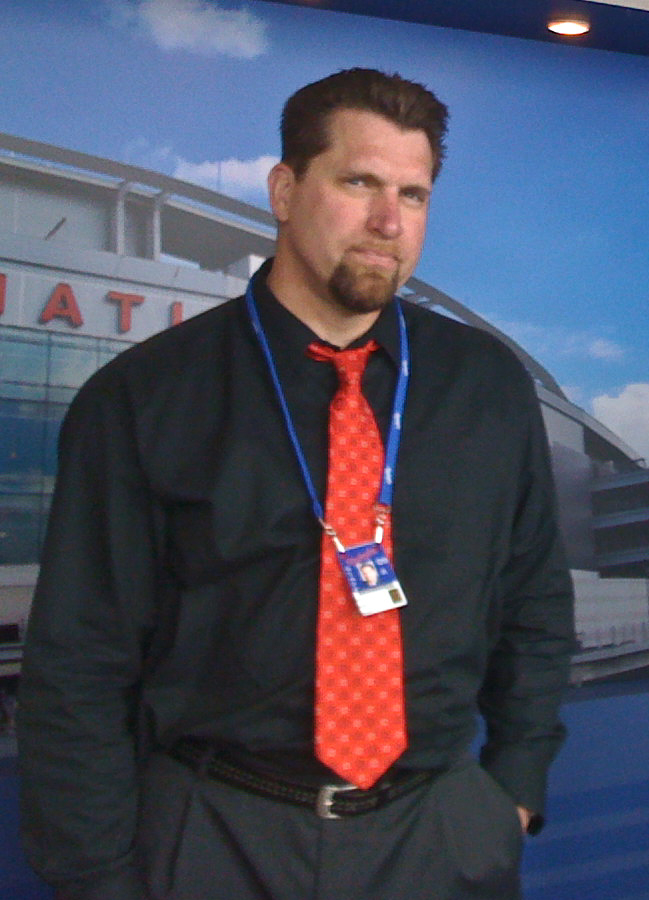
Dibble with the Nationals in 2009.

In 1998, Dibble joined ESPN as a baseball analyst, working mostly on Dan Patrick's radio show. He worked on The Best Damn Sports Show Period as a co-host until 2008, when he left to join Fox Sports on their Saturday baseball program as an analyst. Dibble also spends time as a co-host/analyst of First Pitch on XM Channel 175/Sirius channel 210. He formerly hosted The Show (on the same channel) with Jody McDonald. Dibble served as co-analyst (with Kevin Kennedy) for FoxSports.com on a weekly video segment entitled "Around the Bases." Dibble also was a co-host with former Major League player Denny Hocking on Fox Sports Radio Sunday night programming.

In 2009, Dibble signed a three-year contract to replace Don Sutton as the color voice of the Washington Nationals on MASN. While broadcasting a game in August 2010, Dibble drew negative attention for focusing on a group of female spectators in the Nationals crowd and questioning their focus on the game. He later apologized for the comments. Later in the month, Dibble criticized Nationals rookie pitcher Stephen Strasburg for missing a start due to an injury:

"Suck it up, kid. This is your profession. You chose to be a baseball player. You can't have the cavalry come in and save your butt every time you feel a little stiff shoulder, sore elbow."

It was revealed shortly afterward that Strasburg had torn an elbow ligament and required Tommy John surgery. Dibble took a few days off from MASN after making the comments. On September 1, 2010, MASN announced that Dibble would no longer be calling Nationals games. After losing his job with the Nationals, Dibble apologized for the Strasburg comments on his radio show. In April 2011, Dibble said in an interview on FoxSports.com that the reason for his dismissal was because of an email Strasburg's father sent to the Lerner Family, the owners of the Nationals. Dibble also continued to express his belief that Strasburg should have pitched through his pain. Strasburg denied the claim about his father's e-mail, and Nationals president Stan Kasten called Dibble's account "fictional" and "sad".

By October 31, 2011, Dibble became a member of Mike North's talk radio show.

Dibble had a brief stint as the varsity baseball head coach at Calabasas High School in Calabasas, California. He was fired from his head coaching job on March 27, 2013, only ten games into the season. By December 18, 2013, he, along with Amy Van Dyken, were replaced on Fox Sports Radio's Fox Sports Tonight. Dibble also called games for the Los Angeles Angels for Compass Media.

On March 27, 2014, Dibble became the host of the 3–7 pm (Eastern) sports talk show on WUCS 97.9 FM and WAVZ 1300 AM in the ESPN stations in Hartford and New Haven, Connecticut respectively. He joined interim host Paul Nanos, who filled in when Mike Bower's contract was not renewed. Until the end of October, the show was billed as The Rob Dibble Show with Paul Nanos. In October, the show was renamed The Rob Dibble Show.

In 2024, Dibble signed a five-year extension with Fox Sports to continue hosting his radio show in Connecticut.
