= 1990 Major League Baseball All-Star Game =

1990 American baseball competition

| | 1 | 2 | 3 | 4 | 5 | 6 | 7 | 8 | 9 | R | H | E |
|---|---|---|---|---|---|---|---|---|---|---|---|---|
| American League | 0 | 0 | 0 | 0 | 0 | 0 | 2 | 0 | 0 | 2 | 7 | 0 |
| National League | 0 | 0 | 0 | 0 | 0 | 0 | 0 | 0 | 0 | 0 | 2 | 1 |
- Date: July 10, 1990
- Venue: Wrigley Field
- City: Chicago, Illinois
- Managers: Tony La Russa (OAK); Roger Craig (SF)
- MVP: Julio Franco (TEX)
- Attendance: 39,071
- Ceremonial first pitch: Ernie Banks
- Television: CBS
- TV announcers: Jack Buck and Tim McCarver
- Radio: CBS
- Radio announcers: John Rooney, Jerry Coleman and Johnny Bench

The 1990 Major League Baseball All-Star Game was the 61st playing of the midsummer classic between the all-stars of the American League (AL) and National League (NL), the two leagues comprising Major League Baseball. The game was held on July 10, 1990, at Wrigley Field in Chicago, the home of the Chicago Cubs of the National League. The game resulted in the American League defeating the National League 2–0. The game is remembered for a rain delay in the 7th inning that resulted in CBS airing Rescue 911 during the delay. This is also the first game (and, so far, the only one) to feature two players bearing the same name: Gregg Olson was a pitcher, representing the AL squad and Baltimore Orioles, while catcher Greg Olson represented the NL squad and Atlanta Braves. Outfielder Jose Canseco of the Oakland Athletics and Second Baseman Ryne Sandberg of the Chicago Cubs were the leaders of their leagues in the fan votes.

The pregame ceremonies celebrated the 85th anniversary of the Great Lakes Naval Training Station which, as with previous All-Star Games held in Chicago, provided the colors presentation. After Wayne Messmer sang O Canada, recording artist (and native Chicagoan) Richard Marx sang The Star-Spangled Banner. The last All-Star Game previously held at Wrigley Field was represented by Ernie Banks who threw out the ceremonial first pitch.

The National League registered just two hits in the contest, the fewest by any team in the history of the All-Star Game. As of 2024, this is the most recent occasion on which the Cubs and Wrigley Field have hosted the All-Star Game.

== Rosters ==
Players in italics have since been inducted into the National Baseball Hall of Fame.

=== American League ===
Starters
| Position | Player | Team | All-Star Games |
|---|---|---|---|
| P | Bob Welch | Athletics | 2 |
| C | Sandy Alomar Jr. | Indians | 1 |
| 1B | Mark McGwire | Athletics | 4 |
| 2B | Steve Sax | Yankees | 5 |
| 3B | Wade Boggs | Red Sox | 6 |
| SS | Cal Ripken Jr. | Orioles | 8 |
| OF | José Canseco | Athletics | 4 |
| OF | Ken Griffey Jr. | Mariners | 1 |
| OF | Rickey Henderson | Athletics | 9 |

Pitchers
| Position | Player | Team | All-Star Games |
|---|---|---|---|
| P | Roger Clemens | Red Sox | 3 |
| P | Dennis Eckersley | Athletics | 4 |
| P | Chuck Finley | Angels | 2 |
| P | Randy Johnson | Mariners | 1 |
| P | Doug Jones | Indians | 3 |
| P | Gregg Olson | Orioles | 1 |
| P | Bret Saberhagen | Royals | 2 |
| P | Dave Stieb | Blue Jays | 7 |
| P | Bobby Thigpen | White Sox | 1 |

Reserves
| Position | Player | Team | All-Star Games |
|---|---|---|---|
| C | Lance Parrish | Angels | 8 |
| 1B | Cecil Fielder | Tigers | 1 |
| 2B | Julio Franco | Rangers | 2 |
| 3B | Kelly Gruber | Blue Jays | 2 |
| 3B | Brook Jacoby | Indians | 2 |
| SS | Ozzie Guillén | White Sox | 2 |
| SS | Alan Trammell | Tigers | 6 |
| OF | George Bell | Blue Jays | 2 |
| OF | Ellis Burks | Red Sox | 1 |
| OF | Kirby Puckett | Twins | 5 |
| DH | Dave Parker | Brewers | 7 |

Manager: Tony La Russa, Oakland Coaches: Jeff Torborg, Chicago White Sox, Frank Robinson, Baltimore, Jim Lefebvre, Seattle

=== National League ===
Starters
| Position | Player | Team | All-Star Games |
|---|---|---|---|
| P | Jack Armstrong | Reds | 1 |
| C | Mike Scioscia | Dodgers | 2 |
| 1B | Will Clark | Giants | 3 |
| 2B | Ryne Sandberg | Cubs | 7 |
| 3B | Chris Sabo | Reds | 2 |
| SS | Ozzie Smith | Cardinals | 10 |
| OF | Andre Dawson | Cubs | 7 |
| OF | Lenny Dykstra | Phillies | 1 |
| OF | Kevin Mitchell | Giants | 2 |

Pitchers
| Position | Player | Team | All-Star Games |
|---|---|---|---|
| P | Jeff Brantley | Giants | 1 |
| P | Rob Dibble | Reds | 1 |
| P | John Franco | Mets | 4 |
| P | Neal Heaton | Pirates | 1 |
| P | Dennis Martínez | Expos | 1 |
| P | Ramón Martínez | Dodgers | 1 |
| P | Randy Myers | Reds | 1 |
| P | Dave Smith | Astros | 2 |
| P | Frank Viola | Mets | 2 |

Reserves
| Position | Player | Team | All-Star Games |
|---|---|---|---|
| C | Greg Olson | Braves | 1 |
| C | Benito Santiago | Padres | 2 |
| 2B | Roberto Alomar | Padres | 1 |
| 3B | Tim Wallach | Expos | 5 |
| 3B | Matt Williams | Giants | 1 |
| SS | Shawon Dunston | Cubs | 2 |
| SS | Barry Larkin | Reds | 3 |
| OF | Barry Bonds | Pirates | 1 |
| OF | Bobby Bonilla | Pirates | 3 |
| OF | Tony Gwynn | Padres | 6 |
| OF | Darryl Strawberry | Mets | 7 |

Manager: Roger Craig, San Francisco Coaches: Jim Leyland, Pittsburgh Don Zimmer, Chicago Cubs

== Game ==
=== Umpires ===
| Home Plate | Ed Montague (NL) |
| First Base | Dave Phillips (AL) |
| Second Base | Steve Rippley (NL) |
| Third Base | Mark Johnson (AL) |
| Left Field | Dana DeMuth (NL) |
| Right Field | Tim Welke (AL) |

=== Starting lineups ===
| American League | | | | National League | | | |
| Order | Player | Team | Position | Order | Player | Team | Position |
|---|---|---|---|---|---|---|---|
| 1 | Rickey Henderson | Athletics | LF | 1 | Lenny Dykstra | Phillies | CF |
| 2 | Wade Boggs | Red Sox | 3B | 2 | Ryne Sandberg | Cubs | 2B |
| 3 | José Canseco | Athletics | RF | 3 | Will Clark | Giants | 1B |
| 4 | Cal Ripken Jr. | Orioles | SS | 4 | Kevin Mitchell | Giants | LF |
| 5 | Ken Griffey Jr. | Mariners | CF | 5 | Andre Dawson | Cubs | RF |
| 6 | Mark McGwire | Athletics | 1B | 6 | Chris Sabo | Reds | 3B |
| 7 | Sandy Alomar Jr. | Indians | C | 7 | Mike Scioscia | Dodgers | C |
| 8 | Steve Sax | Yankees | 2B | 8 | Ozzie Smith | Cardinals | SS |
| 9 | Bob Welch | Athletics | P | 9 | Jack Armstrong | Reds | P |

=== Game summary ===
Tuesday, July 10, 1990 7:35 pm (CT) at Wrigley Field in Chicago, Illinois
| Team | 1 | 2 | 3 | 4 | 5 | 6 | 7 | 8 | 9 | R | H | E |
|---|---|---|---|---|---|---|---|---|---|---|---|---|
| American League | 0 | 0 | 0 | 0 | 0 | 0 | 2 | 0 | 0 | 2 | 7 | 0 |
| National League | 0 | 0 | 0 | 0 | 0 | 0 | 0 | 0 | 0 | 0 | 2 | 1 |
WP: Bret Saberhagen (1-0) LP: Jeff Brantley (0-1) Sv: Dennis Eckersley (1)

All the scoring was done by the American League in a single inning. In the top of the seventh inning, Julio Franco hit a double to right field sending Sandy Alomar home from third base and Lance Parrish home from first base. Franco was named the game's MVP.
