= Tim Birtsas =

American baseball player (born 1960)

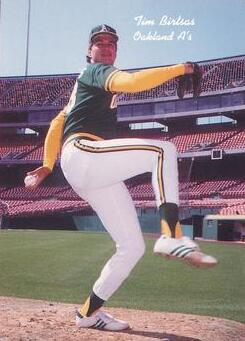
- Birtsas with the Oakland Athletics c. 1986
- Pitcher
- Born: September 5, 1960 (age 66); Pontiac, Michigan, U.S.
- Batted: Left Threw: Left

Professional debut
- MLB: May 3, 1985, for the Oakland Athletics
- NPB: April 10, 1991, for the Yakult Swallows

Last appearance
- MLB: October 3, 1990, for the Cincinnati Reds
- NPB: August 25, 1991, for the Yakult Swallows

MLB statistics
- Win–loss record: 14–14
- Earned run average: 4.08
- Strikeouts: 231

NPB statistics
- Win–loss record: 3–3
- Earned run average: 5.61
- Strikeouts: 72
- Stats at Baseball Reference

Teams
- Oakland Athletics (1985–1986); Cincinnati Reds (1988–1990); Yakult Swallows (1991)

Career highlights and awards
- World Series champion (1990)

Timothy Dean Birtsas (born September 5, 1960) is an American former professional baseball pitcher. He played in Major League Baseball for the Oakland Athletics and Cincinnati Reds from 1985 to 1990 and in Nippon Professional Baseball for the Yakult Swallows in 1991.

== Early years ==
Birtsas earned All-County and All-League honors pitching for Clarkston High School in Independence Township, Michigan. He also played varsity basketball, but it was baseball that earned him a scholarship to Michigan State University. Under legendary coach Danny Litwhiler, he was a second-team All Big Ten Baseball Team selection in 1982 and received the Steve Garvey Sportsmanship Award. He also majored in Recreation and Youth Leadership with an emphasis on children with special needs at MSU.

The New York Yankees did not have a first round selection in the 1982 Major League Baseball draft. With the 36th overall pick, in the second round, they selected Birtsas.

After going 12–8 with a 2.36 earned run average with the Fort Lauderdale Yankees in 1983, Birtsas' 1984 season was delayed by a leg injury in spring training. Once activated, he went 5–1 with a 3.59 ERA in ten starts to help his team win the Florida State League championship. After the season, he was packaged with Jay Howell, Stan Javier, José Rijo and Eric Plunk in a trade to Oakland for Rickey Henderson.

== Oakland A's ==
Birtsas appeared in four games as a minor leaguer for the Oakland A's before receiving a promotion to the big league club. With the A's already losing 10–0 to the Boston Red Sox, Birtsas made his major league debut on May 3, and pitched the final two innings without allowing any more runs while striking out three.

After finishing two more games without allowing any additional runs to score, Birtsas made his first start on May 23, against the Baltimore Orioles. He allowed two runs in six innings while striking out five to pick up the win. He was added to the starting rotation shortly afterwards, and had a 9–2 record following a victory over the Mariners in Seattle on August 10. From there, Birtsas went 1–4 with a 6.10 ERA in his next eight starts to finish the season at 10–6 with a 4.01 ERA.

Birtsas was slated to be one of two left handers out of the Athletics' bullpen for the 1986 season. He allowed five earned runs on two hits (including a grand slam by Brian Downing) and three walks in just one inning in his first appearance of the season. Knee problems were cited as a potential cause of his ineffectiveness. After one more appearance, he was optioned down to triple A Tacoma to "get his groove back." He spent the rest of the season at Tacoma, going 3–7 with a 5.07 ERA, used mostly as a starter.

After splitting the 1987 season between Tacoma and double A Huntsville, Birtsas was again packaged with José Rijo, this time to the Cincinnati Reds for Dave Parker.

== Cincinnati Reds ==
Birtsas entered his first Spring with the Reds competing for a long reliever/spot starter job. He was reassigned to the triple A Nashville Sounds toward the end of Spring training, but was up in the majors by the middle of May. With his record standing at 1–3 with a 4.50 ERA, he was optioned back to triple A at the end of August, but an injury to Rijo helped keep him in the majors through the rest of the season.

Despite the turmoil the Reds faced in 1989 with manager Pete Rose's betting fiasco, Birtsas managed to put together a respectable season. He made a career high 42 appearances, and went 2–2 with a 3.75 ERA while earning his only career save, a rare four inning save, against the San Francisco Giants on August 7. He also got his only career hit in eighteen career at-bats on July 2, a home run off the New York Mets' Sid Fernandez.

On August 7, 1989, Birtsas picked up the one and only save of his MLB career. Birtsas pitched the final 4 innings, allowing 2 hits and no runs, closing out a 10-2 Reds win over the Giants. He struck out 3 batters to preserve the win for starter Ron Robinson.

With new manager Lou Piniella in place for 1990, the Reds started the season off with a nine-game winning streak, and remained in first place in the National League West for the entire season. Four of these nine games were won by relief pitchers (including one by Birtsas), who also compiled five saves. The relief corp of the Reds earned the nickname "The Nasty Boys" along the way, and lived up to this reputation by leading the National League with 46 saves, and compiling 385 strikeouts.

On June 4, Birtsas accomplished the rare feat of striking out four batters in one inning. Regardless, following a poor performance against the Atlanta Braves on June 20, Piniella seemed to lose faith in Birtsas. Birtsas saw little work in key situations in the second half of the season, and was optioned down to triple A toward the end of July. He was recalled in September, and was part of the Reds' post-season roster, but did not make an appearance in the 1990 National League Championship Series with the Pittsburgh Pirates or World Series against the A's. The Reds were 0–12 in Birtsas' final twelve regular season appearances.

== Yakult Swallows ==
When the Reds re-signed second baseman Bill Doran at the 1990 Winter meetings, they released Birtsas to clear a roster spot. With no major league teams bidding on his services, Birtsas signed with the Tokyo Yakult Swallows of Nippon Professional Baseball for the 1991 season. Shortly after his arrival in Tokyo, Birtsas got into a brawl with Yoshihisa Komatsuzaki of the Chunichi Dragons when he threw a brush back pitch Komatsuzaki felt was a little too inside.

== Italian Baseball League ==
In 1992 Birtsas pitched for the Rimini Pirates in the Italian Baseball League, and won two games of the championship series, including a shutout in the third and decisive game, leading his team to the league title with a 3–0 sweep. After pitching in Italy, Birtsas retired due to hip problems.

== Post-playing career ==
Birtsas partnered with Kirk Gibson in a real estate developing and investment managing company called RBI Construction Management. They have also headed restoration projects on historical landmarks in Waterford Township, Michigan and Springfield Township, Oakland County, Michigan.

== See also ==
- List of Major League Baseball single-inning strikeout leaders
