= Glenn Sutko =

American baseball player (born 1968)

- Catcher
- Born: May 9, 1968 (age 58); Atlanta, Georgia, U.S.
- Batted: Right Threw: Right

MLB debut
- October 3, 1990, for the Cincinnati Reds

Last MLB appearance
- July 17, 1991, for the Cincinnati Reds

MLB statistics
- Games played: 11
- Batting average: .091
- Runs Batted In: 1
- Stats at Baseball Reference

Teams
- Cincinnati Reds (1990–1991)

Glenn Edward Sutko (born May 9, 1968) is an American former Major League Baseball catcher who played for the Cincinnati Reds. His major league career lasted only eleven games spread throughout the 1990 and 1991 seasons. He was drafted by the Reds in the 45th round of the 1987 amateur draft. He made his major league debut on October 3, 1990, against the Houston Astros and went 0–1. He played his last major league game the following year on July 17.
