= Gino Minutelli =

American baseball player (born 1964)

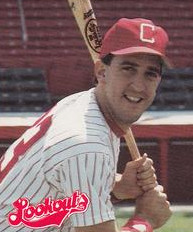
- Minutelli in 1988
- Pitcher
- Born: May 23, 1964 (age 62); Wilmington, Delaware, U.S.
- Batted: Left Threw: Left

MLB debut
- September 18, 1990, for the Cincinnati Reds

Last MLB appearance
- September 9, 1993, for the San Francisco Giants

MLB statistics
- Win–loss record: 0–3
- Earned run average: 5.31
- Strikeouts: 31
- Stats at Baseball Reference

Teams
- Cincinnati Reds (1990–1991); San Francisco Giants (1993)

Gino Michael Minutelli (born May 23, 1964) is an American former Major League Baseball pitcher. He played three seasons at the major league level for the Cincinnati Reds and San Francisco Giants. He was signed by the Reds as an amateur free agent in 1982. Minutelli played his first professional season with Class-A (Short Season) Tri-City Triplets in 1985, and his last with the Atlanta Braves' Triple-A Richmond Braves in 1995.

== Early life ==
Gino was born May 23, 1964, in Wilmington, Delaware. He attended Sweetwater High School (National City, California), and college at Southwestern College. He played at the Major League for the Cincinnati Reds for the first time in 1990 His last game was on September 9, 1993, for the San Francisco Giants.
