= Terry Lee (baseball) =

American baseball player (born 1962)

- First baseman
- Born: March 13, 1962 (age 64); San Francisco, California
- Batted: Right Threw: Right

MLB debut
- September 3, 1990, for the Cincinnati Reds

Last MLB appearance
- August 21, 1991, for the Cincinnati Reds

MLB statistics
- Batting average: .160
- Runs: 1
- Hits: 4
- Stats at Baseball Reference

Teams
- Cincinnati Reds (1990–1991)

Career highlights and awards
- World Series champion (1990)

Terry James Lee (born March 13, 1962) is an American former professional baseball first baseman. He played during two seasons in Major League Baseball (MLB) for the Cincinnati Reds. He was signed by the Reds as an amateur free agent in 1982. Lee played his first professional season with their Class A (Short Season) Eugene Emeralds in 1982, and his last season with the Triple-A affiliates of the Cleveland Indians (Colorado Springs Sky Sox) and Minnesota Twins (Portland Beavers) in 1992.

Attended and graduated from Winston Churchill High School (Eugene, Oregon) in 1980. Lee played basketball at Boise State University from 1982 to 1983.
