= Scott Scudder =

American baseball player (born 1968)

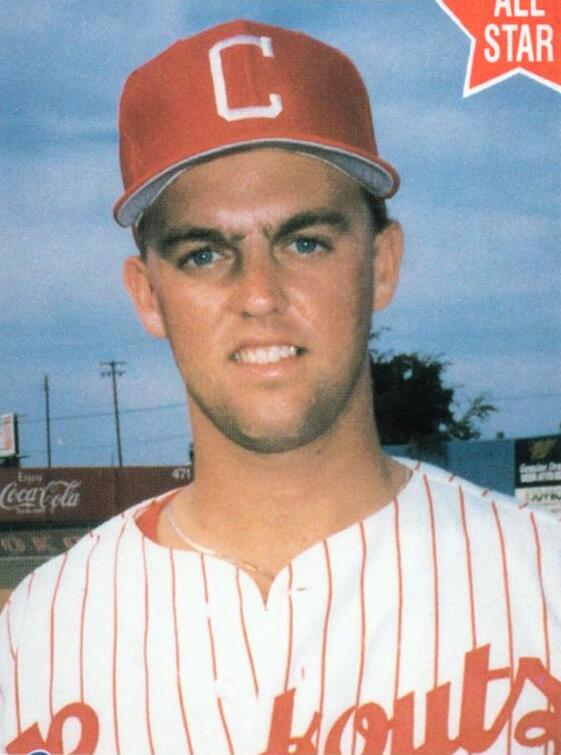
- Scudder in 1988
- Pitcher
- Born: February 14, 1968 (age 58); Paris, Texas, U.S.
- Batted: Right Threw: Right

MLB debut
- June 6, 1989, for the Cincinnati Reds

Last MLB appearance
- May 22, 1993, for the Cleveland Indians

MLB statistics
- Win–loss record: 21–34
- Earned run average: 4.80
- Strikeouts: 226
- Stats at Baseball Reference

Teams
- Cincinnati Reds (1989–1991); Cleveland Indians (1992–1993)

Career highlights and awards
- World Series champion (1990)

William Scott Scudder (born February 14, 1968) is an American former professional baseball right-handed pitcher.

The Cincinnati Reds drafted Scudder in the first round of the 1986 Major League Baseball draft. On May 20, 1988, Scudder pitched a no-hitter for the Cedar Rapids Reds against the Wausau Timbers. He made his Major League Baseball debut with the Reds on June 6, 1989.

Scudder was a member of the Cincinnati Reds team that defeated the Oakland Athletics in the 1990 World Series. He pitched scoreless innings in both the NLCS against the Pittsburgh Pirates and in the World Series against Oakland.

Though mainly a starter during his career, Scudder did pick up one save: on April 17, 1991, he pitched three shutout innings to close out a 5–1 victory over the San Diego Padres.

On November 15, 1991, the Reds traded Scudder, Jack Armstrong, and Joe Turek to the Cleveland Indians for pitcher Greg Swindell. He appeared in his final game with Cleveland on May 22, 1993.

On February 1, 2010, Scudder was announced as a coach at for the Sweden national team, along with manager Dennis Cook.
