= Hal Morris =

American baseball player (born 1965)

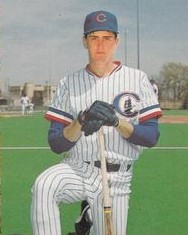
- Morris with the Columbus Clippers in 1988
- First baseman
- Born: April 9, 1965 (age 61); Fort Rucker, Alabama, U.S.
- Batted: Left Threw: Left

MLB debut
- July 29, 1988, for the New York Yankees

Last MLB appearance
- October 1, 2000, for the Detroit Tigers

MLB statistics
- Batting average: .304
- Home runs: 76
- Runs batted in: 513
- Stats at Baseball Reference

Teams
- New York Yankees (1988–1989); Cincinnati Reds (1990–1997); Kansas City Royals (1998); Cincinnati Reds (1999–2000); Detroit Tigers (2000)

Career highlights and awards
- World Series champion (1990)

William Harold Morris III (born April 9, 1965) is an American former Major League Baseball (MLB) first baseman who played for several teams from 1988 to 2000, including a ten-year stint with the Cincinnati Reds. From 2012 until 2016, he was the director of professional scouting for the Los Angeles Angels.

== High school and college career ==
Morris attended Munster High School in Munster, Indiana, and the University of Michigan. While at Munster, he was a three time all Lake Suburban Conference baseball player. He was an Indiana Baseball All Star in 1983, and was named the MVP of the annual North-South All Star Game in Jasper, Indiana, where he went 8–9 in the series. Morris captained the tennis, basketball, and baseball teams in his senior season at Munster.

His Michigan teams won the Big 10 Championship in 1984 and 1986, and advanced to the College World Series in 1984. In his first Big 10 start in 1984 versus Purdue University, Morris hit two home runs. Following his freshman year, he played for the Adray Sound team in the Adray Summer League in Detroit, MI, leading the league in hitting. Michigan's 1985 team lost to Mississippi State in the Southeast Regional. MSU featured future big league players Will Clark, Rafael Palmeiro, Bobby Thigpen and Jeff Brantley. Morris was named to the All Southeast Regional team for his performance, including back to back home runs off of Brantley in the championship game. Morris set records for slugging percentage and batting average while at Michigan. His teammates at Michigan included future Major League players Barry Larkin, Chris Sabo, Jim Abbott, Scott Kamieniecki, Mike Ignasiak, and Gary Wayne. In 1985, he played collegiate summer baseball with the Harwich Mariners of the Cape Cod Baseball League.

== Major League career ==
Morris played for the New York Yankees, the Cincinnati Reds, the Kansas City Royals and Detroit Tigers. Morris was known for his unusual hitting technique, in which his feet never settled as the pitcher delivered the ball, so his swing was preceded by his feet shuffling towards the plate. Morris was not known for his power, but he had the ability to spray the ball to all corners of the ballpark. He also appeared on the cover of Wheaties.

In a 13-year major league career, Morris posted a .304 batting average with 76 home runs and 513 RBI in 1,246 games played. Defensively, he was a solid first baseman, posting a .994 fielding percentage at that position.

=== New York Yankees ===
Morris was selected by the New York Yankees in the eighth round of the 1986 amateur draft. He was named the Rookie of the Year in the New York Penn League in 1986, set an Albany-Colonie Yankees record for hits in a season in 1987, was second in the International League in hitting in 1988, then led the International League in hitting in 1989 at .326. He debuted with the Yankees on July 29, 1988, against the Toronto Blue Jays at Exhibition Stadium in Toronto. He collected a base hit in his first at bat, a single to left field against Toronto reliever Duane Ward. Morris was thought so highly of in the Yankee organization that they considered trading Don Mattingly to make room for him.

=== Cincinnati Reds ===
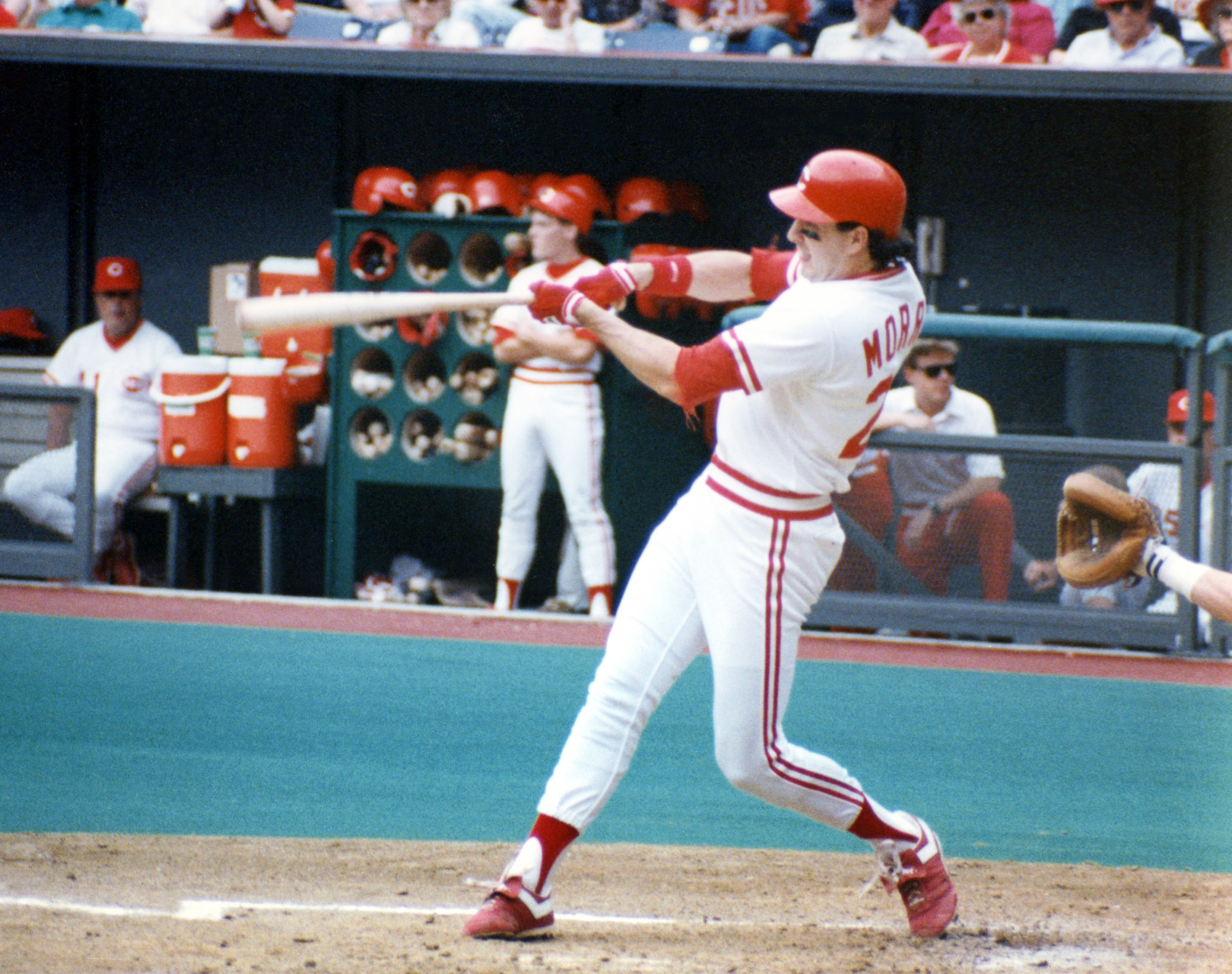
Morris was part of the World Champion Cincinnati Reds in 1990

On December 12, 1989, Morris was traded, along with Rodney Imes to the Cincinnati Reds for pitcher Tim Leary and outfielder Van Snider. The trade proved beneficial for the Reds as Morris was a part of the 1990 Cincinnati Reds, who won the World Series. He hit .340 on the year, which, at the time, was the third highest batting average by a rookie in 50 years. Also, his 136 OPS+ led the team. His sacrifice fly in game 4 turned out to be the series-winning RBI.

While the Reds failed to repeat their World Series win in 1991, Morris had another strong season, finishing one point behind Atlanta's Terry Pendleton in the battle for the National League hitting crown. Morris ended the year at .318, while Pendleton finished at .319.

Until Casey McGehee failed to make the All Star team in 2014, Morris had been the last player to be leading his league in hits at the All Star break and not do so. In 1994, Morris was hitting .358 with 120 hits at the All Star break, but was not selected to the team. Morris was named the 1994 Reds MVP by the Cincinnati Chapter of the Baseball Writers' Association of America.

On November 2, 1995, Morris became a free agent but was re-signed by the Reds on December 6, 1995. Morris compiled a 32-game hitting streak from August 26, 1996, to April 3, 1997. This streak is the longest by a first baseman in the modern era of Major League baseball. His .319 average at Riverfront Stadium was the highest by any Reds player in the history of the stadium.

=== Kansas City Royals ===
Morris was again granted free agency on October 29, 1997, signing with Kansas City in December of that year. He played as a DH, and he hit .309, although his power numbers had dropped. He stayed with Kansas City for one year, before again becoming a free agent. Due to his power number drop off, his next contract would be for less money.

=== Cincinnati Reds ===
Morris re-signed with the Reds, playing the 1999 season with them and part of the 2000 season.

=== Detroit Tigers ===
Morris was sold to the Tigers on July 18, 2000, and played with them for the rest of the season. Since 1961—the start of Major League Baseball's Expansion Era—Hal Morris and Derek Jeter are the only players with a minimum of 10 seasons in the Major Leagues who collected a game-ending RBI in their final home game, according to the Elias Sports Bureau. Morris did it with the Tigers with a pinch-hit single on Oct. 1, 2000, giving his team a 12–11 win over the Twins, while Jeter hit a game winning single against the Orioles in his final appearance at Yankee Stadium on September 25, 2014. For Morris, this was the final at bat of his career.

Morris was declared a free agent on November 1, 2000, and he retired.

== Retirement ==
Kirk Radomski alleged that he sold Morris Deca-Durabolin and testosterone in 1999. Morris' name and address were listed in a book seized from Radomski's home. Through a lawyer, Morris denied using performance-enhancing substances during his career but did not specifically deny buying or possessing them or meeting with Radomski.

After retiring, Morris continued his education by graduating with a BS in Biology from the University of Michigan, and an MBA from Stanford University. Morris has been involved in a variety of real estate and technology ventures, and has been an advisor to Montara Capital Partners, a boutique private equity firm focused on 1031 exchange and tax advantaged real estate transactions. Before joining the Angels in November 2011, he was a professional scout for the Pittsburgh Pirates for two seasons and the Boston Red Sox for one (2011). His brother, Bobby, played professional baseball between 1993 and 2001. Morris served as the pro scouting director for the Los Angeles Angels from 2011 to 2016.

== See also ==
- List of Major League Baseball players named in the Mitchell Report
