= Norm Charlton =

American baseball player and coach (born 1963)

- Pitcher
- Born: January 6, 1963 (age 63); Fort Polk, Louisiana, U.S.
- Batted: Switch Threw: Left

MLB debut
- August 19, 1988, for the Cincinnati Reds

Last MLB appearance
- October 7, 2001, for the Seattle Mariners

MLB statistics
- Win–loss record: 51–54
- Earned run average: 3.71
- Strikeouts: 808
- Saves: 97
- Stats at Baseball Reference

Teams
- Cincinnati Reds (1988–1992); Seattle Mariners (1993); Philadelphia Phillies (1995); Seattle Mariners (1995–1997); Baltimore Orioles (1998); Atlanta Braves (1998); Tampa Bay Devil Rays (1999); Cincinnati Reds (2000); Seattle Mariners (2001)

Career highlights and awards
- All-Star (1992); World Series champion (1990)

Norman Wood Charlton III (born January 6, 1963), nicknamed "the Sheriff", is an American former professional baseball relief pitcher who played in Major League Baseball (MLB) for the Cincinnati Reds, Seattle Mariners, Philadelphia Phillies, Baltimore Orioles, Atlanta Braves, and Tampa Bay Devil Rays.

== Early life and amateur career ==
Charlton was born in Fort Polk, Louisiana, and graduated from James Madison High School in San Antonio, Texas. He attended Rice University in Houston, Texas, playing for coach David Hall. He set several new Owls records in the sport, including a career ERA of 2.25 and an 11-win season.

== Playing career ==
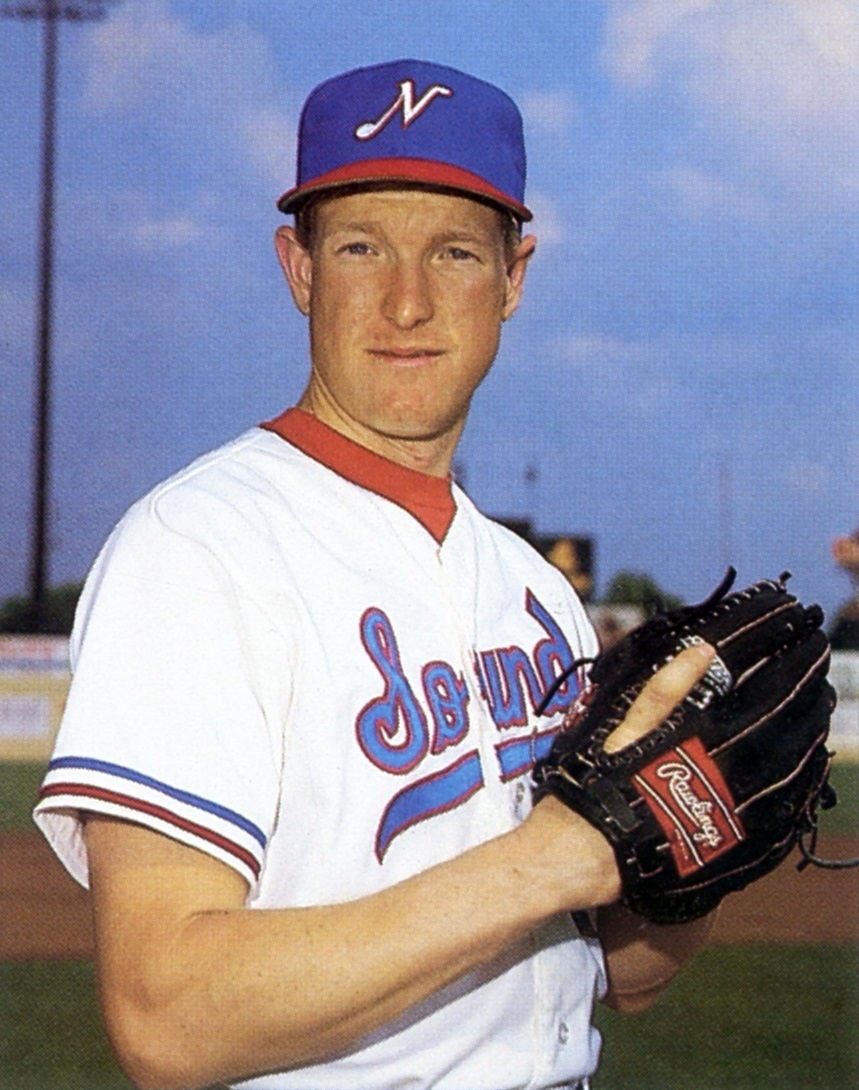
Charlton with the Nashville Sounds in 1987

The Montreal Expos drafted Charlton with the 28th overall selection in the first round of the 1984 MLB draft.

Charlton was best known as being part of the infamous "Nasty Boys" relief pitching corps for the 1990 Reds team that won the World Series. Randy Myers and Rob Dibble were the other two members. The relievers were known for their clutch, shutdown performances, particularly during the playoff run; their blazing fastballs; and their bruising beanballs. In 1990, Charlton also plowed over Los Angeles Dodgers catcher Mike Scioscia to score a run in a nationally televised Sunday night game. Among the relievers, Charlton was known as "The Genius", due to studies at Rice. In 1992, Charlton, the Reds' last remaining effective Nasty Boy, was named to the All-Star Game and had a career-high 26 saves.

Charlton had three stints with the Seattle Mariners that included some team success. After Reds manager Lou Piniella left for Seattle, Cincinnati traded Charlton to the Mariners for Kevin Mitchell. The 1993 Mariners were the first team in franchise history to finish with a winning record. Charlton had 18 saves but his season ended in August due to a torn ligament in his throwing elbow. Mariners broadcaster Dave Niehaus nicknamed him "The Sheriff".After missing the 1994 season, Charlton signed with the Philadelphia Phillies, who released him in July 1995. The Mariners re-signed him and he returned to the closer role during the 1995 "Refuse to Lose" team that was the first Mariner team to reach the playoffs. Charlton was a lefty specialist for the 2001 team that won an MLB-record 116 games, contributing to a bullpen that also featured closer Kazuhiro Sasaki, Jeff Nelson, and fellow lefty Arthur Rhodes.

== Post-playing career ==
Charlton began working for the Seattle Mariners in 2003 as a special assignment coach. In 2004 he was a scout, later returning to the special assignment role. On October 22, 2007, the Mariners named Charlton as their bullpen coach. After one season, his contract, along with those of the remainder of the 2008 coaching staff, was not renewed following the hire of Don Wakamatsu as the club's manager in November 2008.

== Personal life ==
Charlton is married.

Charlton graduated from Rice University in 1986 with a degree in political science. He had enough credits to have also majored in religion or physical education. Charlton's father was also a Rice alumnus, walking on to the university's track and field team, and later worked in the university's physical education department.
