= Chris Sabo =

American baseball player (born 1962)

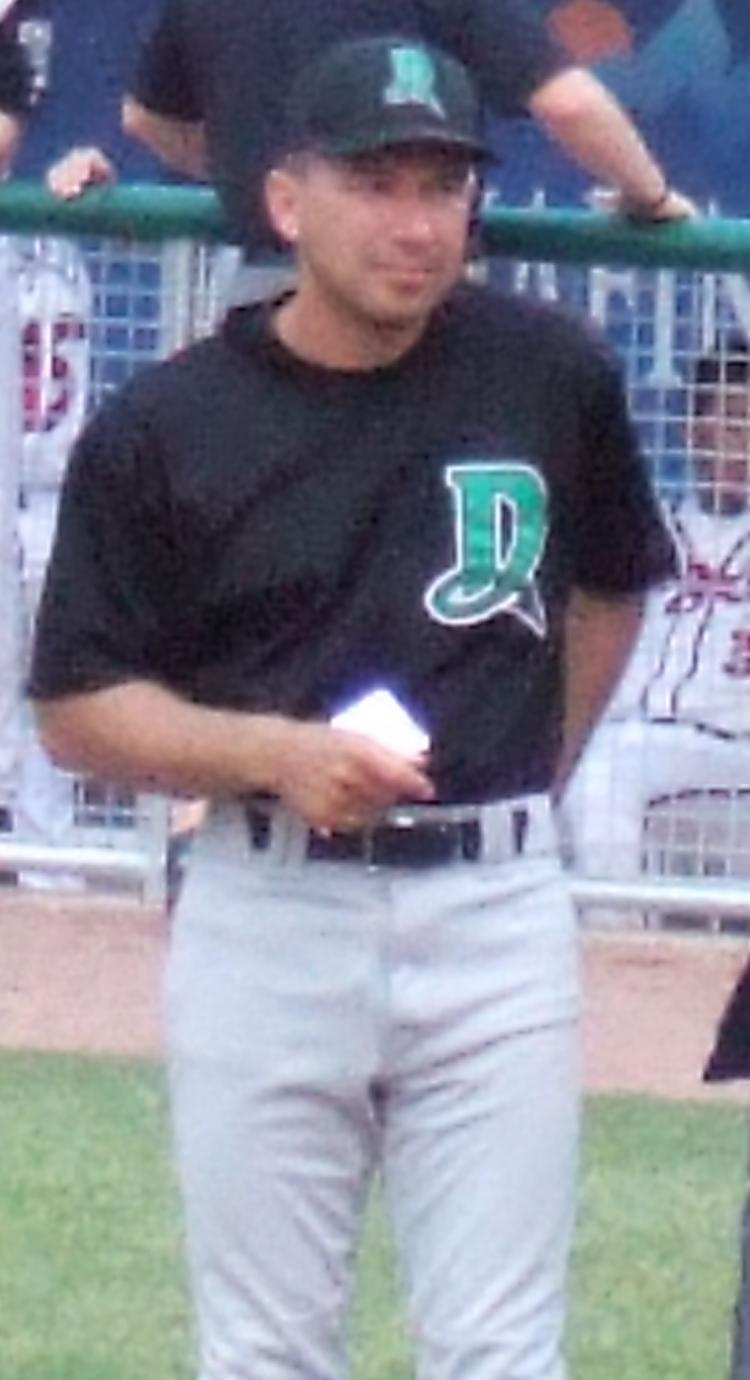
- Sabo as a coach for the Dayton Dragons in 2005
- Third baseman
- Born: January 19, 1962 (age 64); Detroit, Michigan, U.S.
- Batted: Right Threw: Right

MLB debut
- April 4, 1988, for the Cincinnati Reds

Last MLB appearance
- September 2, 1996, for the Cincinnati Reds

MLB statistics
- Batting average: .268
- Home runs: 116
- Runs batted in: 426
- Stats at Baseball Reference

Teams
- Cincinnati Reds (1988–1993); Baltimore Orioles (1994); Chicago White Sox (1995); St. Louis Cardinals (1995); Cincinnati Reds (1996)

Career highlights and awards
- 3× All-Star (1988, 1990, 1991); World Series champion (1990); NL Rookie of the Year (1988); Cincinnati Reds Hall of Fame

Christopher Andrew Sabo (born January 19, 1962) is an American former third baseman in Major League Baseball who played for the Cincinnati Reds, Baltimore Orioles, Chicago White Sox, and St. Louis Cardinals between 1988 and 1996. He was the head baseball coach of the Akron Zips (2020–2022).

== Early life ==
Sabo was born in Detroit, Michigan, the son of a plumber and a waitress. The Sabos lived in Rosedale Park, three blocks from Willie Horton, a member of the 1968 World Champion Detroit Tigers.

Sabo attended Detroit Catholic Central High School. In high school, he excelled as both a hockey goalie and a golfer in addition to being one of the area's best baseball players, twice earning all-state honors. Sabo played hockey on two national championship 17-and-under teams and, before enrolling at Michigan, also played hockey as a goaltender in one game in the Ontario Junior Hockey League for the Niagara Falls Flyers in the 1979–80 season. As a senior, he was torn between pursuing a hockey career or a baseball career but ultimately chose baseball and a scholarship to the University of Michigan despite being drafted in the 1980 Major League Baseball draft by the Montreal Expos.

In 1982, he played collegiate summer baseball with the Orleans Cardinals of the Cape Cod Baseball League. A third baseman, Sabo was a key component on a strong Michigan team that finished third in the College World Series in 1983, a season in which Sabo was joined as a starting infielder by future Reds teammate and Baseball Hall of Famer Barry Larkin. That season, Sabo earned first-team All-American honors from The Sporting News and Baseball America.

== Professional career ==
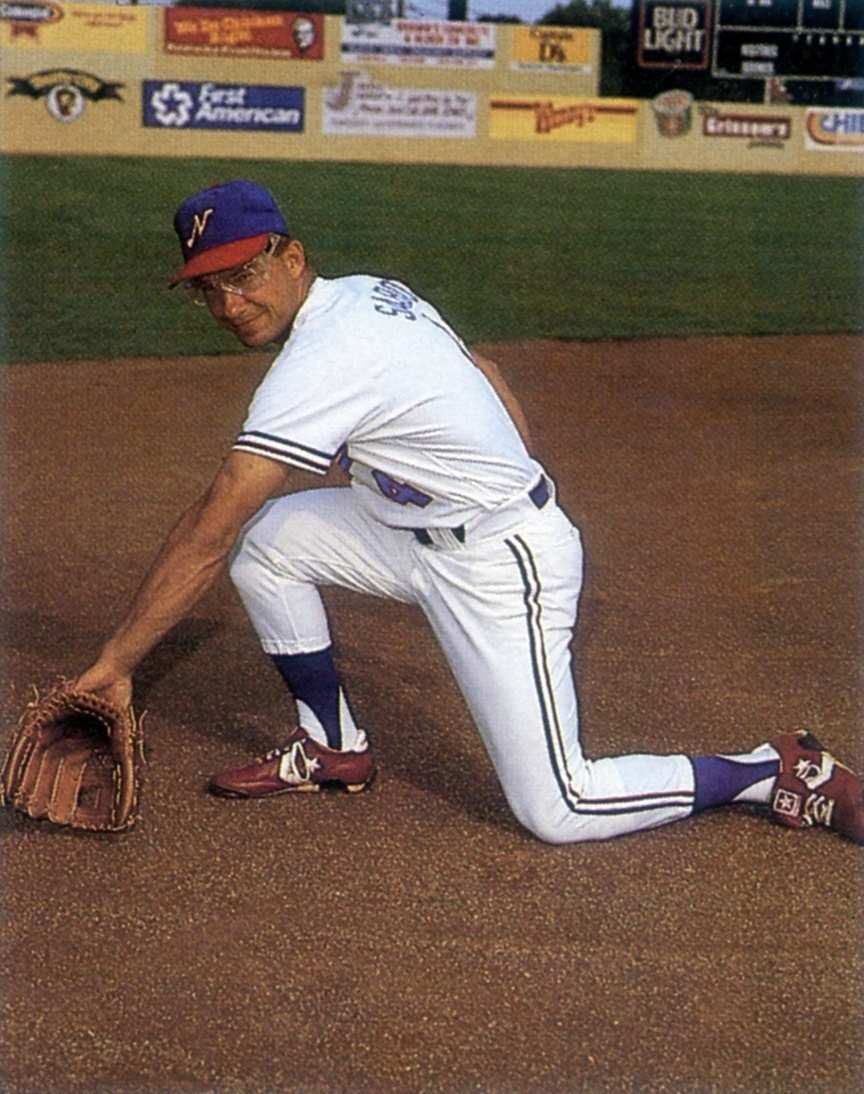
Sabo with the Nashville Sounds in 1987

=== Cincinnati Reds ===
Sabo was drafted out of high school by the Montreal Expos in the 1980 Major League Baseball Draft, but did not sign. Three years later, he was selected by the Cincinnati Reds in the second round of the 1983 draft, and this time did sign, thus beginning his professional career.

Sabo spent five seasons in the Reds' minor league system, during which he never put up impressive numbers, although in two of those seasons he was named the Most Valuable Player of his team. By 1988, he was given little chance of making the big-league team out of spring training, but his ability combined with his grit and hustle was reminiscent of, and endeared him to, Reds manager Pete Rose. With Buddy Bell starting the season on the disabled list and the Reds needing a third baseman, Sabo stepped in and was the opening day starter. Batting eighth, Sabo collected his first hit, stolen base and run scored in the seventh inning and made a run-saving play on defense in the Reds' 5–4, 12-inning win over the St. Louis Cardinals. In his second MLB game, Sabo tied the all-time record for the most successful fielding assists by a third baseman with 11, a mark which has not been surpassed.

Sabo continued to make the most of the opportunity throughout the season. On April 18, he hit his first career home run, a solo shot off San Francisco Giants pitcher Mike Krukow. For the season, he posted a .271 average with 11 home runs and 44 RBI, pounded out 40 doubles and also stole 46 bases. He won the National League Rookie of the Year Award and quickly became a fan favorite with his hustle and determination punctuated by his flat-top haircut and ever-present wraparound protective eyeglasses commonly known as Rec Specs. That season, Sabo was featured on the cover of Baseball America and The Sporting News and was the subject of a feature article in Sports Illustrated.

After a forgettable 1989 campaign in which he was limited to 82 games, Sabo returned to help lead the Reds to a World Series Championship as he batted .270 with 25 home runs and 71 RBI. Sabo also had an outstanding World Series, batting an astounding .583 with nine hits in 16 at bats, including two home runs and five RBI plus two walks. At the Reds' Fountain Square victory celebration, he famously grabbed the microphone and bellowed to the cheering crowd, "We've got the rings, we've got the money, we've got everything!"

He had his most productive season in 1991, posting career-highs in batting average (.301), home runs (26), RBI (88), hits (175) and games played (153).

Sabo made the National League All-Star team in 1988, 1990 and 1991.

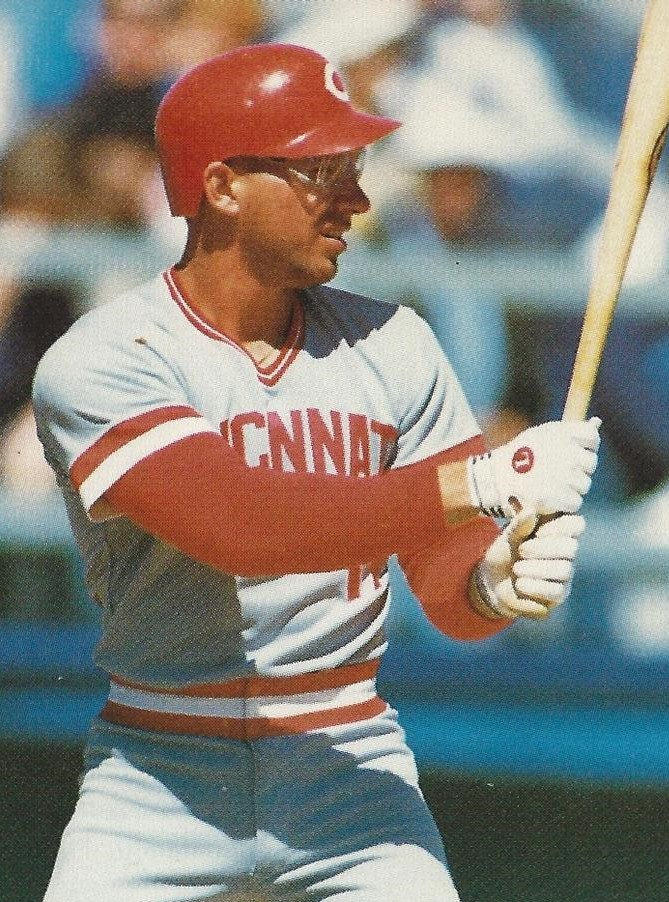
Sabo with the Cincinnati Reds

After injuries limited his play in 1992, his production dropped off drastically. Sabo never again hit above .260 nor would have more than 10 steals in a season.

=== Stint with three teams ===
Baltimore signed him in 1994 where he endured another injury-plagued season and then split 1995 between Chicago and St. Louis.

=== Return to Cincinnati Reds ===
His final season was in Cincinnati in 1996. In July, Sabo shattered his bat, which was filled with cork. As a result of the incident, Sabo received a seven-game suspension. Sabo maintains that he never corked a bat in his life, claiming that the bat in question (which he was given in the middle of the plate appearance after breaking his original bat) belonged to another player (whom he would not name). Sabo also pointed out his minimal offensive numbers that year (.256 batting average with 3 home runs). Moreover, even the live television announcers believed the illegal bat had already cracked on a foul ball prior to breaking it on the following pitch, leading them to speculate (after the cork was discovered) that it would have been highly unlikely for Sabo to knowingly risk using an apparently damaged bat if he had known it was also corked.

In a nine-season career, Sabo hit .268 with 116 home runs and 426 RBI in 911 games. An excellent fielder, Sabo led National League third basemen in fielding percentage in 1988 and 1990 and was second in 1991.

Reds manager Pete Rose gave Sabo the nickname "Spuds" during his rookie season in 1988, citing a resemblance to a bull terrier character in Bud Light commercials named Spuds MacKenzie.

On October 23, 2018, Sabo was named head baseball coach at the University of Akron. Akron had a losing record of 1–12 in their 2020 season.

== Head coaching record ==
Record table
Season	Team	Overall	Conference	Standing	Postseason
Akron Zips (Mid-American Conference) (2020–2022)
2020	Akron	1–12	0–0		Season canceled due to COVID-19
2021	Akron	15–36	8–32	11th	
2022	Akron	15–41	11–29	11th	
Akron:		31–89	19–61		
Total:		31–89			
National champion Postseason invitational champion Conference regular season champion Conference regular season and conference tournament champion Division regular season champion Division regular season and conference tournament champion Conference tournament champion

== Personal life ==
Sabo lives in Lakewood Ranch, Florida, with his wife, Susan, whom he married in 1989, and their three daughters Annie, Brooke, and Olivia. Annie joined her dad’s former team 2022-25 as host of Cincinnati’s “Reds Live" pre- and post-game shows and sideline reporter for Bally Sports Ohio and later FanDuel Sports Network.

He has served as a coach in the Reds' minor league system for the Advanced Rookie Billings Mustangs and Class A Dayton Dragons. He has also served as an assistant coach for the University of Cincinnati. In 2009, he began attending the Northern Kentucky University law school.

Sabo was inducted in the Cincinnati Reds Hall Of Fame, along with Big Red Machine reliever Pedro Borbón and 19th-century pitcher Tony Mullane, on July 17, 2010. The Reds gave away Chris Sabo bobblehead dolls to fans in attendance that evening.

On January 29, 2017, Sabo was named Field Manager of the Green Bay Bullfrogs of the Northwoods League, a college summer league.

On October 23, 2018 Sabo was introduced as the new head coach of the baseball team at the University of Akron. The program practiced with redshirted walk-ons (as is the practice for a new program) with the first class of recruits for the 2019–20 academic year. Sabo parted ways with Akron in 2022.

In May 2023, Sabo was appointed the manager of the Mumbai Cobras, an India-based franchise in the Baseball United league, which plans to bring professional baseball to South Asia and the Middle East.

He is a golfer, plays in celebrity golf tournaments and is a member of Kenwood Country Club in Cincinnati. He has qualified for several major United States Golf Association tournaments. He is also a figure at Reds reunion events.

Preceded by Kevin Seitzer	Topps Rookie All-Star Third Baseman; 1988	Succeeded by Craig Worthington
