= Lou Piniella =

American baseball player and manager (born 1943)

- Piniella in 1981 card
- Left fielder / Manager
- Born: August 28, 1943 (age 83); Tampa, Florida, U.S.
- Batted: Right Threw: Right

MLB debut
- September 4, 1964, for the Baltimore Orioles

Last MLB appearance
- June 16, 1984, for the New York Yankees

MLB statistics
- Batting average: .291
- Home runs: 102
- Runs batted in: 766
- Managerial record: 1,835–1,712
- Winning %: .517
- Stats at Baseball Reference
- Managerial record at Baseball Reference

Teams
- As player: Baltimore Orioles (1964); Cleveland Indians (1968); Kansas City Royals (1969–1973); New York Yankees (1974–1984); As manager: New York Yankees (1986–1987, 1988); Cincinnati Reds (1990–1992); Seattle Mariners (1993–2002); Tampa Bay Devil Rays (2003–2005); Chicago Cubs (2007–2010); As coach: New York Yankees (1984–1985)

Career highlights and awards
- All-Star (1972); 3× World Series champion (1977, 1978, 1990); AL Rookie of the Year (1969); 3× Manager of the Year (1995, 2001, 2008); Cincinnati Reds Hall of Fame; Seattle Mariners Hall of Fame

Louis Victor Piniella (/piːnˈjeɪjɑː/ usually /pɪˈnɛlə/; born August 28, 1943) is an American former professional baseball player and manager. As an outfielder, he played 18 seasons in Major League Baseball (MLB) with the Baltimore Orioles, Cleveland Indians, Kansas City Royals and New York Yankees. During his playing career, he was named AL Rookie of the Year in 1969 and captured two World Series championships with the Yankees (1977, 1978).

Following his playing career, Piniella became a manager for the Yankees (1986–1988), Cincinnati Reds (1990–1992), Seattle Mariners (1993–2002), Tampa Bay Devil Rays (2003–2005), and Chicago Cubs (2007–2010). He won the 1990 World Series championship with the Reds and led the Mariners to four postseason appearances in seven years (including a record 116-win regular season in 2001). As the Mariners' manager, Piniella presided over the franchise's most successful period. He also captured back-to-back division titles (2007–2008) during his time with the Cubs.

Piniella was named Manager of the Year three times during his career (1995, 2001, 2008) and finished his managerial career ranked 14th all time on the list of managerial wins.

He was nicknamed "Sweet Lou", for his swing as a major league hitter, though the nickname was also used ironically in reference to his fiery demeanor as a player and manager.

== Early life ==
Piniella was born in Tampa, Florida. Though he is often mistaken for being Italian American, Piniella's parents were of Asturian descent, from northwest Spain. He grew up in West Tampa, and played American Legion baseball and PONY League baseball alongside fellow future major league manager Tony La Russa. Piniella attended Jesuit High School in Tampa, where he played several sports and was an All-American in basketball. After graduation in 1961, he attended the University of Tampa for a year, where he was a College Division (today's Division II) All-American in baseball for the Spartans.

== Playing career ==
1970 photocard of Piniella for Kansas City Royals

Following his freshman year in college, Piniella was signed by the Cleveland Indians as an amateur free agent on June 9, 1962. That fall, he was drafted by the Washington Senators from the Indians in the 1962 first-year draft. On August 4, 1964, Piniella was sent to the Baltimore Orioles to complete an earlier trade for Buster Narum. He made his major league debut that year on September 4 at age 21, appearing as a pinch hitter and grounding out in his first at bat. He returned to the Indians organization when the Orioles traded him and $25,000 for Cam Carreon on March 10, 1966. He spent three seasons with the Portland Beavers of the Pacific Coast League (PCL) from 1966 to 1968., then returned to the majors with Cleveland near the end of the 1968 season, appearing in six games and going hitless in five at-bats with one RBI.

In the middle part of the decade, Piniella played winter baseball in Nicaragua.

Piniella was selected by the Seattle Pilots in the 1968 expansion draft in October, but was traded after spring training on April 1, 1969 to the expansion Kansas City Royals for John Gelnar and Steve Whitaker.

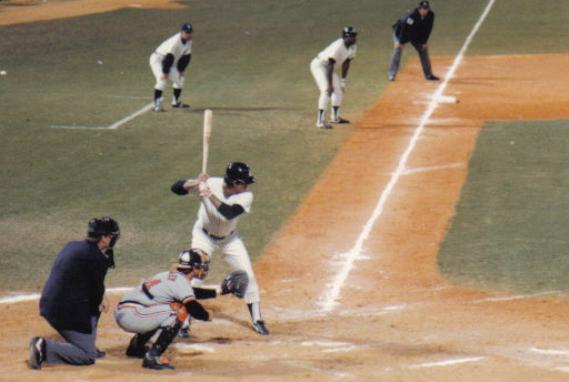
Piniella at-bat in a 1983 spring training game

Piniella played with the Royals for their first five seasons (1969–1973) and was the American League's Rookie of the Year in 1969 and was named to the 1972 All-Star Game. He was the first batter in Royals history; on April 8 of their first season in 1969, he led off the bottom of the first inning against left-hander Tom Hall of the Minnesota Twins. Piniella doubled to left field, then scored on an RBI single by Jerry Adair. On April 16, 1970, Piniella went 3–5 with a home run while accomplishing the rare feat of being thrown out at all four bases in the same game.

After the 1973 season, Piniella was traded with Ken Wright to the New York Yankees for Lindy McDaniel. Baseball author Bill James described the trade as the only significant mistake the Royals made during the 1970s. He played with the Yankees for eleven seasons, during which they won five AL East titles (1976–78, 1980, 1981), four AL pennants (1976–78, 1981), and consecutive World Series (1977–78). In 1975, he missed part of the year with an inner ear infection. From mid-1977 through the end of 1980, he split his playing time between left field, right field, and designated hitter.

In his career, Piniella made one All-Star team and compiled 1,705 lifetime hits despite not playing full-time for nearly half of his career. He received two votes for the Hall of Fame as a player in 1990.

== Coaching and front office career ==
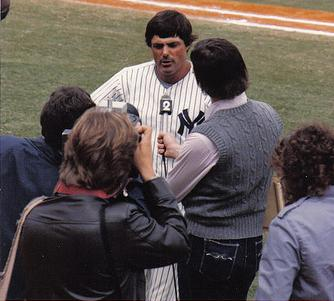
Piniella, age 39, speaks to a WCBS-TV reporter during spring training in 1983

=== New York Yankees ===
While he was still an active player, Piniella served on the Yankees coaching staff as the hitting coach. On October 28, 1985, he accepted an offer to become the Yankees' manager. His initial managerial contract for 1986 was for $200,000. Piniella managed the Yankees from 1986 to 1987; promoted to general manager to start the 1988 season, he took over as manager after the firing of Billy Martin (in his fifth and final run as Yankee manager) on June 23. Combining both stints as Yankees manager, he posted 224 wins and 193 losses.

=== Cincinnati Reds ===
The Cincinnati Reds let go of Tommy Helms after he managed the last 37 games of the 1989 season (marred by the permanent ban of player-manager Pete Rose). October 13 saw the hiring of former Yankee front officeman Bob Quinn as general manager. Piniella was hired by the Reds on November 3, 1989 on a three-year deal for $350,000 after getting approval from Steinbrenner to be released from the personal services contract that paid Piniella $400,000 each for two years. Piniella managed the club from 1990 through 1992 with a 3-year contract worth $1.05 million. In his first year, the Reds won the World Series in a four-game sweep of the favored defending champion Oakland Athletics. The sweep over the Athletics, who had won 12 more games than the 91-win Reds during the regular season, was widely regarded as an upset, and it was the first Reds title since 1976. However, Piniella's tenure with the Reds became challenging in subsequent seasons. Wracked with injuries and a less effective bullpen that saw the team lose ten games in a row in July, the Reds finished with the worst winning percentage for a defending World Series champion, a dubious mark later surpassed by the 1998 Florida Marlins and 2014 Boston Red Sox.

During an August 1991 game Piniella had a heated confrontation with umpire Gary Darling, who had overturned a call that cost the Reds a home run, and after the game Piniella accused Darling of being biased against the Reds. Two months later, Darling and the Major League Umpires Association sued for defamation to the tune of $5 million against Piniella. When he asked owner Marge Schott for help, she did not budge on helping with paying for a lawyer, which Piniella had to do out of his own pocket. While he stated that he realized his own error in making the statement against Darling, the fact that he received no backing from the Reds played a key part in him not wanting to manage there. The lawsuit ended in compromise, with Piniella issuing a statement.

Following his third season with the Reds, Piniella announced in October that he had rejected a contract extension. He finished with a record of 255 wins and 231 losses. He was replaced by Tony Pérez, who was fired 44 games into the 1993 season for Davey Johnson. Since Piniella's departure, the Reds have won only one postseason series. The 1990 World Series win was the only World Series win for Piniella as a manager in his career.

=== Seattle Mariners ===
Under a new ownership group, Piniella was introduced as the new manager of the Mariners in November 1992 and led the Seattle Mariners for ten seasons (1993–2002). His wife Anita initially insisted that he not take the job. They lived in New Jersey in Allendale, and she thought Seattle was too far away from their family and children, and spring training was in Arizona instead of Florida. His initial contract in Seattle was for $2.5 million over three years, significantly more than his predecessor, Bill Plummer, who had a two-year $500,000 contract.

On August 18, 1999, Piniella won his 1,000th game (having managed 1,926 in total) in a 5–1 victory over the Toronto Blue Jays.

Piniella won the AL Manager of the Year Award in 1995, and again in 2001, when he led the Mariners to a record-tying 116 wins. After winning the 2001 AL Division Series against the Cleveland Indians, the Mariners dropped the first two games of the AL Championship Series to the New York Yankees, and Piniella held an angry post-game press conference in which he guaranteed the Mariners would win two out of three games in New York to return the ALCS to Seattle. However, the Yankees closed out the series at Yankee Stadium, and the Mariners would not reach the postseason again until 2022. Following the 2002 season, Piniella requested out of his final year with the Mariners to manage the Tampa Bay Devil Rays. As compensation, the Devil Rays traded outfielder Randy Winn to the Mariners for infield prospect Antonio Pérez.

Piniella finished with a record of 840 wins and 711 losses. All four of the Mariners' playoff appearances in team history to that point were under Piniella. On August 9, 2014, Piniella was inducted into the Seattle Mariners Hall of Fame.

=== Tampa Bay Devil Rays ===
Piniella returned to the Tampa area in October 2002, taking over for a team that had just finished at 55–106 (.342) under Hal McRae. In his first two seasons with the Devil Rays, Piniella was able to improve the team somewhat, and they won a franchise-record 70 games in 2004. This was also the first season in which they did not finish last in their division.

During the 2005 season, Piniella was critical of the Devil Rays' front office for focusing too much on the future and not enough on immediate results, and for not increasing payroll quickly enough to field a competitive team. The Devil Rays started the season with a $30 million payroll, which was the lowest in the major leagues; the Yankees payroll in 2005 was over $208 million. Tensions eventually made Piniella step down as the Devil Rays' manager on September 21. He finished with a record of 200 wins and 285 losses. He had a season remaining on his four-year $13 million contract from October 2002, but agreed to a $2.2 million buyout, in lieu of $4.4 million that he was due for a fourth season. He would have also received $1.25 million in deferred salary from 2003.

=== Chicago Cubs ===
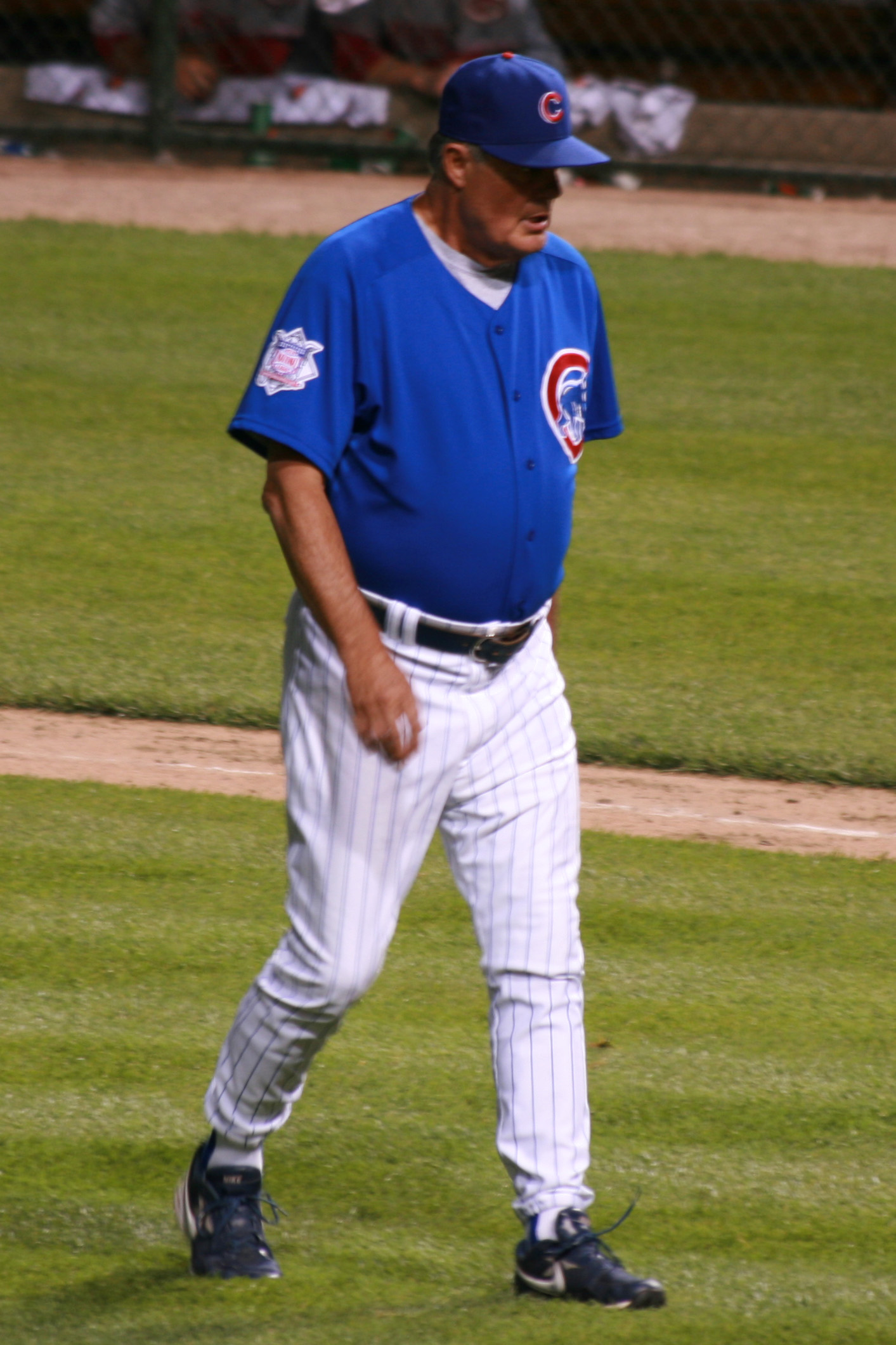
Piniella with the Chicago Cubs in 2008.

On October 16, 2006, Piniella agreed to a three-year contract to manage the Chicago Cubs for $10 million with a $5 million option for a fourth year in 2010.

Though Piniella's Cubs won the Central Division in his first two years (2007–2008), and boasted the best record in the NL in 2008, the Cubs were swept in the postseason both years, first by the Arizona Diamondbacks in the 2007 NLDS and then the Los Angeles Dodgers in the 2008 NLDS. Piniella was named NL Manager of the Year for 2008.

In 2010, Piniella announced on July 20 his intention to retire as manager of the Cubs at season's end. However, on August 22, Piniella decided to resign after that day's game, stating that he wanted to care for his ailing 90-year-old mother. He finished with a record of 316 wins and 293 losses.

=== San Francisco Giants ===
On February 2, 2011, Piniella was hired by the San Francisco Giants as a special consultant. He did not return to that position after the season.

=== Return to Cincinnati Reds ===
On February 5, 2016, Piniella rejoined the Cincinnati Reds as a special consultant.

== Managerial record ==
Team	Year	Regular season					Postseason			
Team	Year	Games	Won	Lost	Win %	Finish	Won	Lost	Win %	Result
NYY	1986	162	90	72	.556	2nd in AL East	–	–	–	–
NYY	1987	162	89	73	.549	4th in AL East	–	–	–	–
NYY	1988	93	45	48	.484	5th in AL East	–	–	–	–
NYY total		417	224	193	.537		0	0	–	
CIN	1990	162	91	71	.562	1st in NL West	8	2	.800	Won World Series (OAK)
CIN	1991	162	74	88	.457	5th in NL West	–	–	–	–
CIN	1992	162	90	72	.556	2nd in NL West	–	–	–	–
CIN total		486	255	231	.525		8	2	.800	
SEA	1993	162	82	80	.506	4th in AL West	–	–	–	–
SEA	1994	112	49	63	.438	3rd in AL West	–	–	–	–
SEA	1995	145	79	66	.545	1st in AL West	5	6	.455	Lost ALCS (CLE)
SEA	1996	161	85	76	.528	2nd in AL West	–	–	–	–
SEA	1997	162	90	72	.556	1st in AL West	1	3	.250	Lost ALDS (BAL)
SEA	1998	161	76	85	.472	3rd in AL West	–	–	–	–
SEA	1999	162	79	83	.488	3rd in AL West	–	–	–	–
SEA	2000	162	91	71	.562	2nd in AL West	5	4	.556	Lost ALCS (NYY)
SEA	2001	162	116	46	.716	1st in AL West	4	6	.400	Lost ALCS (NYY)
SEA	2002	162	93	69	.574	3rd in AL West	–	–	–	–
SEA total		1551	840	711	.542		15	19	.441	
TB	2003	162	63	99	.389	5th in AL East	–	–	–	–
TB	2004	161	70	91	.435	4th in AL East	–	–	–	–
TB	2005	162	67	95	.414	5th in AL East	–	–	–	–
TB total		485	200	285	.412		0	0	–	
CHC	2007	162	85	77	.525	1st in NL Central	0	3	.000	Lost NLDS (ARI)
CHC	2008	161	97	64	.602	1st in NL Central	0	3	.000	Lost NLDS (LAD)
CHC	2009	161	83	78	.516	2nd in NL Central	–	–	–	–
CHC	2010	125	51	74	.408	resigned	–	–	–	–
CHC total		609	316	293	.519		0	6	.000	
Total		3548	1835	1713	.517		23	27	.460	

== Broadcasting career ==
In 1989, Piniella worked as a color analyst for Yankees telecasts on MSG Network. After parting ways with the Devil Rays in 2005, Piniella was an analyst for Fox Sports, first joining Joe Buck and Tim McCarver calling the 2005 American League Championship Series. He was then an analyst with the network for the 2006 season, and also joined Thom Brennaman and Steve Lyons for the postseason.

On February 22, 2012, it was announced Piniella would join the YES Network as an analyst for Yankees games. He made his YES debut on March 4 during a Yankees-Phillies spring training game. He left the network after the season.

== Personal life ==
Piniella married his wife Anita (Garcia) in 1967, and together they have three children.

Piniella suffered a mini-stroke in June 2017, but sufficiently recovered to resume his role as senior advisor to baseball operations with the Cincinnati Reds for the 2018 season. He was also diagnosed with prostate cancer.

== Hall of Fame consideration ==
Piniella has been a candidate for election to the Baseball Hall of Fame by the Veterans Committee three times, in 2016, 2018, and 2023 but has thus far failed to be elected. In 2018 he received 11 of a required 12 votes for the 2019 induction class. On the ballot for December 2023, he again received eleven votes, one short of induction.

== In other media ==
Piniella made a cameo appearance in the 1994 film Little Big League.

In late 2007, Piniella appeared in a television commercial for Aquafina bottled water in which he parodies his famous June 2, 2007 meltdown at Wrigley Field.

Piniella and Chicago White Sox manager Ozzie Guillén appeared in one commercial to advertise a local car dealership during the first half of the 2008 Crosstown series. The creators of the commercial used their likeness in three other commercials, which featured stunt doubles riding bicycles and jumping rope.

In 2009, Piniella did a commercial for DirecTV and in 2018, commercials in the Seattle area for Sustainable Housing for Ageless Generations (SHAG), formerly Senior Housing Assistance Group, a non-profit senior citizen affordable living organization.

== See also ==
- List of Major League Baseball annual doubles leaders
- List of Major League Baseball managerial wins and winning percentage leaders
