= Aldine High School =

Public school in Texas, United States

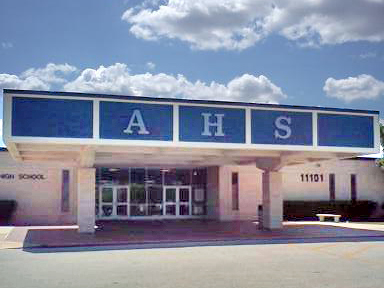

Location
- 11101 Airline Drive; Houston, Texas 77037-1183; United States; 29°55′00″N 95°24′30″W

Information
- School type: Public high school
- Established: 1932
- School district: Aldine Independent School District
- Principal: Lulu DeAnda
- Staff: 167.44 (FTE)
- Grades: 10-12 (A few ninth grade students also attend select classes at Aldine High School)
- Enrollment: 2,564 (2023–2024)
- Student to teacher ratio: 15.31
- Colors: Royal blue, Columbia blue, and white The official school colors are Royal blue, white, and Columbia blue.
- Athletics conference: UIL Class 6A, Region II, District 16
- Mascot: Mustangs
- Rival: MacArthur High School
- Website: Aldine High School

Aldine Senior High School is a public high school located in the Greenspoint district of northern Houston, Texas, United States. It is part of the Aldine Independent School District. The senior high school campus serves grades 10 through 12 (although a few ninth grade students attend select classes at Aldine High). The separate Aldine Ninth Grade School hosts students in grade 9.

== Location ==
Campuses in Houston: Aldine Ninth Grade School's position is indicated relative to the main school

Aldine Senior High is located at 11101 Airline Drive, at the intersection of Airline and West Road. Its 2012-2013 attendance boundaries are bordered by the Sam Houston Tollway on the north, the Hardy Toll Road on the east and Veterans Memorial Drive for the majority of the western edge. The southern boundary is the Aldine Independent School District boundary line, which is a straight line about a quarter mile south of Gulf Bank Road extending from the Hardy Toll Road to Veterans Memorial Drive east to west. The North Freeway runs just to the west of the center of the zone north to south.

The approximately 12-square mile attendance zone takes in portions of Houston and unincorporated areas in Harris County in zip codes 77037, 77038, 77060 and 77088. This area includes the neighborhoods of Airline Farms, Blue Bell Village, Colonial Hills, Fallbrook, Greenridge North, Hidden Valley, Imperial Valley, North Shepherd Plaza, Northline Terrace, Oak Glen, Ridgepoint, and several smaller subdivisions. It also takes in numerous multi-family apartment complexes along Airline Drive, Aldine-Bender Road, Blue Bell Road, Fallbrook Drive, Plaza Verde Drive, Veterans Memorial Drive, West Road and Winding Bayou Trace. The school serves portions of the Aldine CDP, the Greenspoint District, the Airline Improvement District and the City of Houston's Super Neighborhood 7. Harris County Housing Authority's sole public housing for families, Waterside Court, is zoned to this school.

== 2015 bond improvements ==
In November 2015, Aldine Independent School District voters overwhelmingly approved a $798 million bond package to fund numerous campus construction and renovation projects across the district. The bond package includes two major projects at Aldine High School, each designed to alleviate overcrowding at the campus, which the district says is currently 12.5 percent over capacity.

In early 2016, Aldine ISD held a planning meeting and released additional details about the work to be done at Aldine High.

This work includes the addition of a new wing of classrooms on the north side of the campus, adjacent to the existing "400 Hall" and currently the location of the school's bus ramp and canopy. This new, as yet unnamed wing will contain 18 classrooms, a "flex" room, a work room, space for the school's ROTC program, and men's and women's restrooms. The bus ramp and canopy will be relocated further north, between the new wing and the existing tennis courts.

The primary Career and Technology (CTE) wing on the west side of the campus will undergo, depending on the specific area, demolition and rebuilding, or renovation and repurposing. According to Aldine ISD plans as linked on the district website in the citation above:

- The Air Conditioning and Heating lab, and the Building Trades labs will be demolished and converted to Technology Education and Pre-Veterinary classrooms.
- The existing Pre-Veterinary classroom will be demolished and the existing Welding lab will be expanded and renovated.
- The existing Automotive lab will be renovated and expanded.
- One existing Art lab will be demolished and replaced with a new Culinary Arts lab.
- Another existing Art lab will be converted to a Computer Maintenance lab or a History classroom (based on future CTE needs).
- Another Art lab will be expanded and converted to a Drafting lab.
- The existing Cosmetology Lab will be renovated.

In other CTE areas located on the south side of the campus:

- The existing Culinary Arts lab will be demolished and converted to a Speech / Debate lab.
- A block of computer technology rooms will be renovated to provide a new Visual Arts lab for sculpture, drawing and photography.

Administrative areas in the north end of the campus will see the following renovation work, again according to Aldine ISD plans noted in the citation in the second paragraph:

- A new corridor will be installed from the front office to the Vice Principal's suite.
- The reception desk will be brought into compliance with the Americans With Disabilities Act (ADA).

Restrooms throughout the campus will be renovated, repaired and brought into compliance with the ADA.

Finally, hallway transom windows in each classroom (put in place for ventilation when the campus had no air conditioning) will be removed. This will allow the hallway ceilings to be lowered and lighting to be improved and upgraded.

No project timetable has been released. However, the bond originally called for construction to be completed no later than 2019.

== Academic performance ==
For the 2018-2019 school year, Aldine High School received a C grade from the Texas Education Agency, with an overall score of 78 out of 100. The school received a C grade in two domains, Student Achievement (score of 73) and Closing the Gaps (score of 71), and a B grade in School Progress (score of 81). The school did not receive any of the seven possible distinction designations.

Historic Aldine High TEA Ratings
YEAR	RATING
2019	C
2018	Met Standard
2017	Met Standard
2016	Met Standard
2015	Met Standard
2014	Met Standard
2013	Met Standard
2012	no rating given
2011	Academically Acceptable
2010	Academically Acceptable
2009	Academically Acceptable
2008	Academically Acceptable
2007	Academically Acceptable
2006	Academically Acceptable
2005	Academically Acceptable
2004	Academically Acceptable
2003	no rating given
2002	Recognized
2001	Recognized
2000	Acceptable
1999	Recognized
1998	Acceptable
1997	Acceptable
1996	Acceptable
1995	Low Performing
1994	Acceptable

Note that the TEA gave no campus or district accountability ratings in 2003 and 2012 as it was revising its ratings system.

In 2017, the organization Children At Risk gave Aldine Senior High an "F" and ranked it number 182 (out of 187) in the Greater Houston area and 1350 (out of 1376) in the state of Texas.

In contrast, Children At Risk had ranked Aldine High School as one of the best in Greater Houston for 2006, calling it the area's sixth best high school.

Historic Children at Risk Ratings for Aldine High School
YEAR	GRADE	AREA RANKING	STATE RANKING
2017	F	182	1350
2016	D+	116	801
2015	C+	79	626
2014	D	132	1107
2013	C	77	765
2012	n/a	110	1019
2011	n/a	103	991
2010	n/a	98	837
2009	n/a	103	n/a
2008	n/a	n/a	n/a
2007	n/a	n/a	n/a
2006	n/a	6	n/a

Note that no letter grades are available prior to 2013.
Note that no statewide rankings are available prior to 2010.
Children at Risk did not evaluate Aldine High School in 2007 or 2008.

U.S. News & World Report awarded Aldine Senior High a bronze medal in its 2015 annual national high school ratings. In 2013, the magazine gave Aldine Senior High a silver medal and ranked the school number 178 on its list of best high schools in the state of Texas (out of 1,870) and number 2,036 (out of nearly 22,000) in its list of best high schools in the United States. However, the magazine did not rank Aldine High among its best in either 2014 or 2015.

Historic U.S. News & World Report ratings for Aldine High School
Year	Medal rating
2015	Bronze
2013	Silver
2012	Silver

Note that U.S. News & World Report did not award Aldine Senior High a medal in 2014.

In March 2013, San Diego State University's National Center for Urban School Transformation gave Aldine High School its National Excellence in Urban Education Bronze Award.

In 2006 Spivak noted that the school ranked well on Children at Risk's rankings, which surprised the student body, which according to him did not see the school in a favorable light. Spivak also noted the school's surrounding area had problems with crime, at odds with the U.S. perception of a high performing school as being in a good neighborhood.

== Demographics ==
For the 2018-2019 school year, the demographic breakdown of Aldine Senior High was:

- African American: 6.9%
- Hispanic: 90.3%
- White: 1.6%
- American Indian: 0.1%
- Asian: 1.0%
- Pacific Islander: 0.0%
- Two or More Races: 0.0%
- Economically Disadvantaged: 86.2%
- English Language Learners: 27.6%

Today's demographic breakdown continues a long trend at Aldine Senior High that has seen the campus change from majority white to majority Hispanic over the past 30+ years.

Historic Aldine High Demographics 1988 - 2015
	1988	1990	1995	2000	2005	2010	2015
African American	27.2%	29.1%	34.4%	29.7%	26.5%	16.9%	8.7%
Hispanic	19.6%	23.8%	35.4%	53.0%	65.8%	78.0%	87.9%
White	46.7%	41.6%	24.6%	12.0%	6.2%	2.9%	1.8%
Other	6.5%	6.6%	5.5%	5.3%	1.5%	2.2%	1.6%

Circa 1986 above 60% of the student body was made up of non-Hispanic white students; minority enrollment increased after that. In 2006, the enrollment was above 2,191, with 10% of its students initially classified as being English language learners, 70.7% being classified as low income, 65.8 Hispanic or Latino, 25.4% Black, 6% White, 2.7% Asian, and 0.1% Native American.

== Athletics ==
Aldine Senior High's mascot is the Mustang and the school colors are Royal blue and white, although in 2015, the football team began using Columbia blue as its primary color to pay homage to the team's glory years of the 1980s and 1990s.

In 2006 Todd Spivak of the Houston Press wrote Aldine High was "best known for its rich sports tradition".

Aldine High participates in a variety of boys and girls sports in the University Interscholastic League's (UIL) District 16-6A, including:

- Baseball
- Boys Basketball
- Boys Soccer
- Boys Track
- Boys Cross Country
- Football
- Girls Basketball
- Girls Soccer
- Girls Track
- Girls Cross Country
- Golf
- Tennis
- Swimming
- Softball
- Volleyball

W.W. Thorne Stadium serves as the home of the football and boys and girls soccer teams. The volleyball and boys and girls basketball teams play at the M.O. Campbell Center. Elliot Lansford Field hosts boys baseball games and the AISD Softball Complex is the home of the girls softball team.

Since its founding, Aldine High School has had several of its teams advance to state tournaments and finals, with squads in two sports winning championships.

The Aldine boys' basketball team reached the Class 3A state semifinals in 1960, but lost to the eventual champion Lamesa Golden Tornadoes, 51-48. The Mustangs did win the state tournament Consolation game (3rd Place), beating the Fort Worth Castleberry Lions, 51-37.

The boys' baseball team won the 1970 Class 4A state championship, defeating the Bellaire Cardinals in a 4-0 no-hitter.

The Aldine Senior High football team won the 1990 Class 5A Division II state championship, beating the Arlington Lamar Vikings 27-10. ESPN named the 1990 Aldine Mustangs its mythical National Champions following the game. The win came a year after Aldine fell 28-14 to the Odessa Permian Panthers in the 1989 Class 5A finals. The Mustangs also advanced to the state 5A Division II semifinal rounds in 1991 (losing 20-13 to the San Antonio Marshall Rams) and 1996 (dropping a 42-21 decision to the eventual state champion Austin Westlake Chaparrals).

== Clubs and extracurricular activities ==
Aldine Senior High students can partake in a number of clubs and extra-curricular activities, including:

- Band
- Business Professionals of America (BPA)
- Cheerleaders
- Choir
- Debate
- Drama
- Family, Career and Community Leaders of America (FCCLA)
- Future Business Leaders of America (FBLA)
- Future Farmers of America (FFA)
- History Fair
- Health Occupation Students of America (HOSA)
- JROTC - Air Force
- Ladies of Distinction (LOD)
- National Honor Society
- National Art Honor Society
- National Spanish Honor Society
- National Technical Honor Society
- Science Fair
- Student Council
- Student Venture
- Technology Students of America (TSA)
- Texas Association of Future Educators (TAFE)
- Spelling Team
- Vaqueras Drill Team
- Yearbook

== Feeder pattern ==
Ninth Grade schools that feed directly into Aldine Senior High School include:

- Aldine Ninth Grade School

Middle schools (grades 7 and 8) in Aldine Senior High School's feeder system include:

- Aldine Middle School (partial)
- Grantham Academy (partial)
- Plummer Middle School (partial)
- Stovall Middle School

Intermediate schools (grades 5 and 6) in Aldine Senior High School's feeder system include:

- Eckert Intermediate (partial)
- Hill Intermediate (partial)
- Marcella Intermediate (partial)
- Stehlik Intermediate (partial)

Elementary schools (grades K through 4) in Aldine Senior High School's feeder system include:

- Black Elementary (partial)
- Bussey Elementary
- Carroll Academy (partial)
- Goodman Elementary (partial)
- Gray Elementary (partial)
- Odom Elementary
- Thompson Elementary

Part of the November 2015 bond package includes funds to reconfigure elementary, intermediate and middle schools. This reconfiguration could alter Aldine High's future feeder pattern. The bond calls for intermediate schools (currently grades 5-6) to be converted to Pre-K and kindergarten campuses, elementary schools (currently grades K-4) to change to grades 1-5, and middle schools (currently grades 7-8) to serve grades 6-8. The changes are designed to ease overcrowding and reduce the number of school transitions between grade levels. No timetable has yet been announced as to when the changes will be implemented.

== History ==
=== Origins (1932–1933) ===
The history of what is today Aldine Senior High School predates the 1935 creation of the Aldine Independent School District (AISD).

In the early 1930s, Harris County Common School District 29 (the predecessor to AISD) operated four wooden frame schoolhouses for white students in grades 1-7. These were scattered throughout the district in the unincorporated Aldine, Brubaker, Higgs and Westfield communities. (Black students attended separate schoolhouses in Higgs and Westfield.)

On June 18, 1932, District 29 residents approved a $40,000 bond to consolidate the white schoolhouses into one new, centralized school. The new building was to be located just east of Aldine, as it was near the geographic center of the district.

Plans were quickly drawn for a two-story, red brick campus that would contain 12 classrooms and an auditorium. It would house primary grades 1-7 and also allow the district to offer the first two years of high school (grades 8 and 9). (Previously, District 29 students who wanted a high school education had to commute to Houston's Jefferson Davis High. However, school attendance in Texas during the early 1930s was not compulsory past age 14.)

When the 1932-33 academic year began, high school students met at Memorial Baptist Church, then located at East Montgomery Road (today's Airline Drive) and Gulf Bank Road, until construction on the new building could be completed.

=== The S.M.N. Marrs School (1933–1936) ===
The new, as yet unnamed school opened in February 1933 at the intersection of Aldine-Bender Road and Aldine-Westfield, in what was then rural north central Harris County, 13 miles from Houston. The school was immediately filled to capacity.

Marrs School circa 1947

Intensifying the crowded conditions, District 29 added grades 10 and 11 for the 1933-34 school year to complete what was then considered a full secondary education program. (Twelfth grade was not common in rural Texas schools in the 1930s.)

Overcrowding caused the district to move the old Aldine frame schoolhouse to the Marrs site to accommodate overflow. Eventually, overcrowding became so severe that by 1935 the auditorium was partitioned into three classrooms to make room for more students.

Sometime in 1933, or no later than early 1934, the school was named for S.M.N. Marrs, a state superintendent of public instruction who had recently died. Marrs had championed rural education and financially weak school districts in his tenure.

On May 25, 1934, S.M.N. Marrs School graduated its first high school class, consisting of nine students.

In January 1935, the first known Marrs School athletic team participated in varsity competition. The boys basketball team, playing as Aldine High School (rural Texas high schools often competed under the local community name rather than the actual school name, if different), took on a Spring high school squad.

On May 4, 1935, voters in District 29 approved creation of the Aldine Independent School District (AISD).

In the fall of 1935, the high school opened a new gymnasium/auditorium. As AISD was then operating with meager funds, the district struck a deal with an area oil company to use salvaged lumber from a nearby producing field to construct the facility.

=== Marrs High School (1936–1948) ===
With the S.M.N. Marrs School overflowing, AISD voters approved a $25,000 bond for construction of a new 10-classroom junior/senior high school building on September 7, 1935. This new building opened in 1936 next door to the Marrs School on Aldine-Westfield Road. It, too, was named S.M.N. Marrs. The older building continued in use for many more years as an elementary school and later an alternative education center. Today it still exists as the Ellen Lane School.

Marrs High School circa 1939

Marrs High was expanded in the fall of 1939. The school constructed a six-classroom wing as well as a detached agriculture building and a home economics cottage.

AISD and Marrs High added twelfth grade for the 1941-42 school year, as mandated by the state of Texas.

=== The first Aldine High School (1948–1954) ===
Needing to accommodate a rapidly growing student population, AISD opened yet another high school located immediately to the north of S.M.N. Marrs High in the spring of 1948. This campus was officially named Aldine High School, the first to formally bear that name. The former Marrs High School was turned into a junior high. Part of its structure, and several classrooms, were incorporated into the successor Aldine Middle School, built on the same site several years later and still in use today.

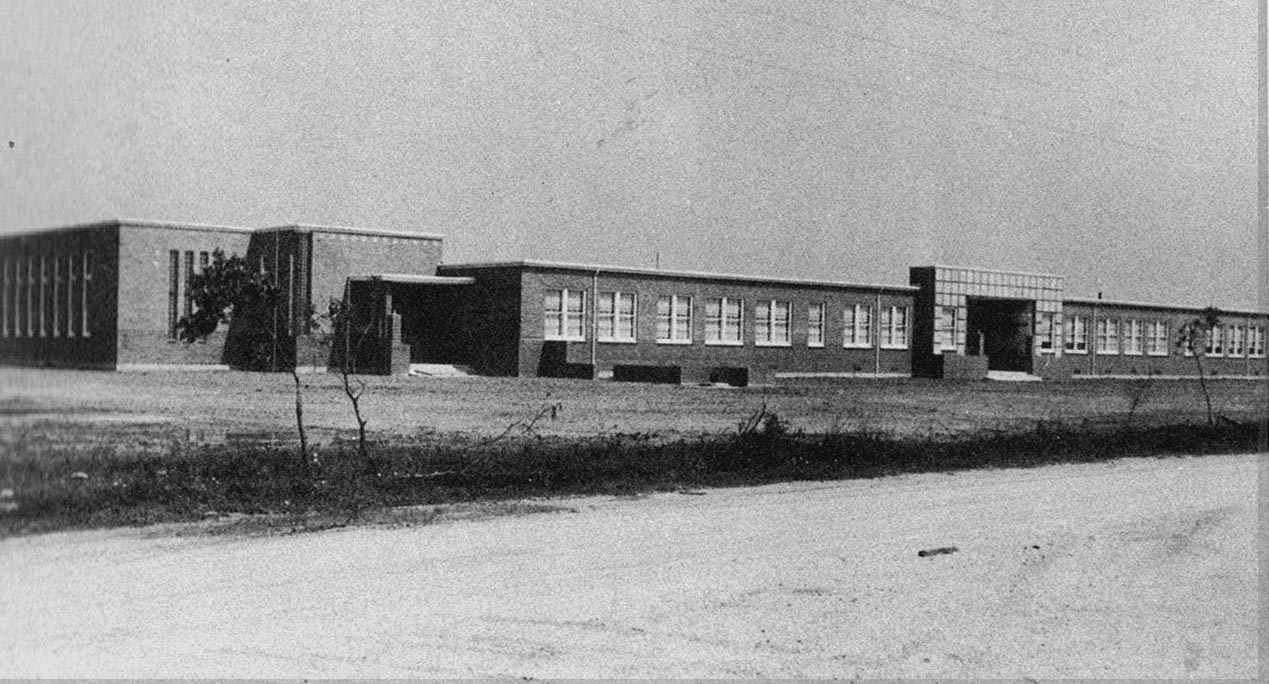
The first Aldine High School in 1948

Several months later, the school's 1935-era wood frame gymnasium/auditorium burned to the ground on November 19, 1948, along with the adjacent old Aldine schoolhouse. The blaze took place just hours before Aldine High School's annual Homecoming dance.

Aldine High added a six-classroom wing in 1953.

On November 24, 1954, the main Aldine High School building was destroyed by a six-alarm fire. The fire destroyed nearly all student records and textbooks. Aldine students had to attend classes in shifts in the older junior high building until a new school could be built.

=== Modern Aldine High School (1956–present) ===
In September 1956, a replacement campus was opened nearly five miles to the west at 11101 Airline Drive at West Road, on the site of the former Gulf Coast Airport.

Aldine Senior High, along with all other Aldine Independent School District (AISD) schools at the time, canceled classes April 16 and 17, 1959, after AISD teachers walked off the job because the district was broke and couldn't make its payroll. The Texas Legislature authorized the selling of $200,000 of time warrants to tide the district over until the end of the school year. However, AISD teachers walked out again on April 30, 1959. The teachers were not paid that time because feuding school board officials could not agree on who should be allowed to sign district paychecks and the district's bank would not issue checks until the matter was resolved. The second walkout lasted through May 19, 1959.

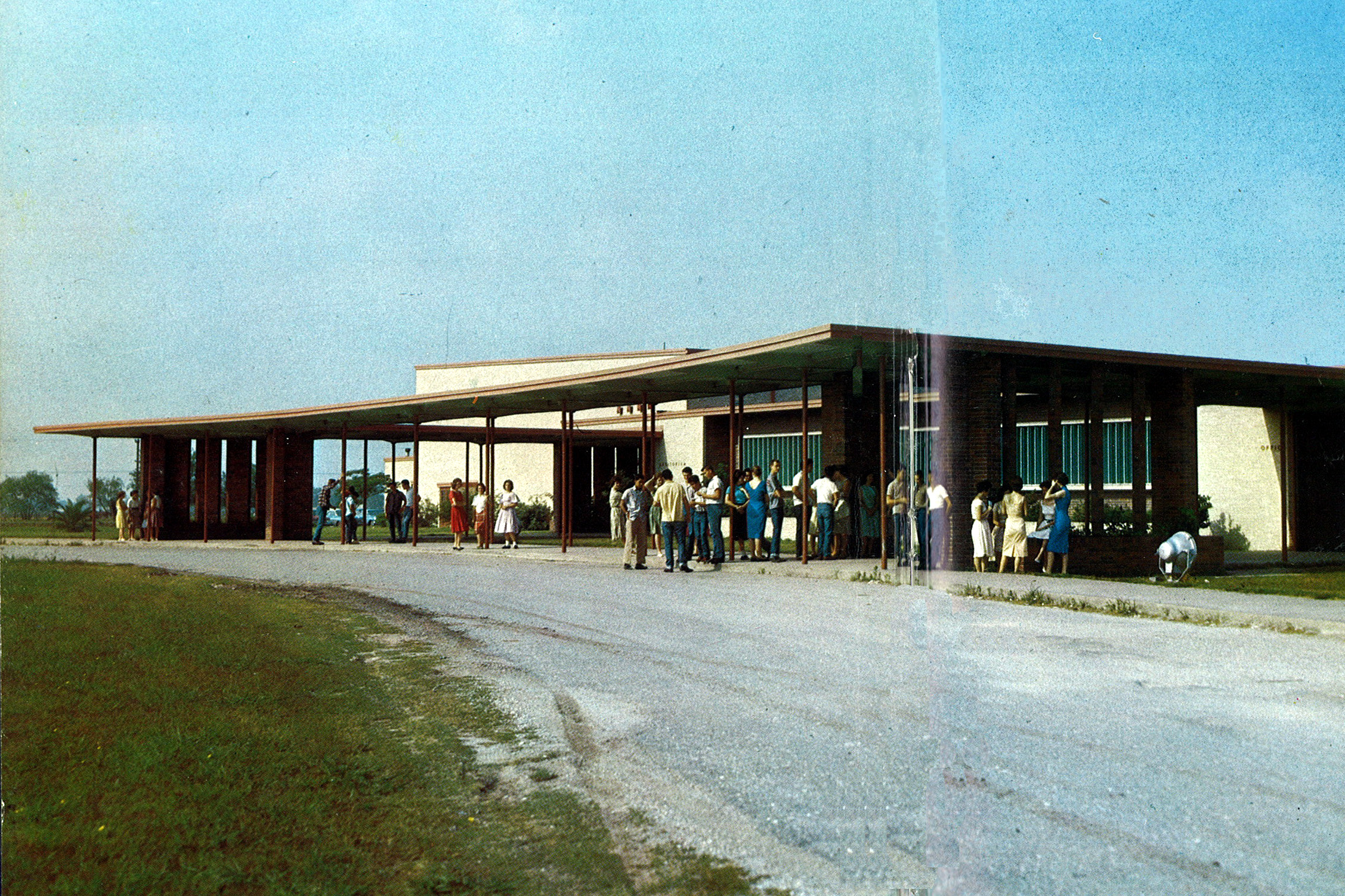
Facade of current Aldine High School in 1961

In March 1965, AISD was ordered by a United States federal court to desegregate its schools, including Aldine High School. (Aldine High School was ordered to be integrated by September 1, 1967.) This order was strengthened in 1977 and remained in effect until 2003, when it was rescinded.

Aldine Senior High hosted the inaugural classes of North Harris County College, consisting of 613 students, in September 1973.

A white Aldine High student was stabbed to death on April 8, 1975, by a black student who was trying to cut in the cafeteria line. Although authorities could find no racial motivation in the crime, the Ku Klux Klan burned a cross on the Aldine High lawn two days later to protest the murder.

Five Aldine Senior High band members were injured September 8, 1977, when a section of the home-side bleachers at the on-campus Aldine Athletic Stadium collapsed prior to an Aldine–Carver football game.

The next year, Aldine High School took in about 175 Carver students when that school was turned into an alternative education campus as a result of the 1977 federal desegregation order.

Another federal judge ruled in May 1982 that the lyrics to the Aldine School Song, which begin with the words, "Dear God, please bless our school...", were religious in nature and that school and/or district officials could no longer lead or organize singing of the song at school events.

The Aldine High School band marched in the 1993 inaugural parade for President Bill Clinton.

In 1998, Aldine's ninth graders were moved to a new campus, Aldine Ninth Grade School, located behind the main campus along the North Freeway. This was done, in part, to ease overcrowding, but also to make the transition to high school easier for freshmen.

Aldine High School introduced four career-centered academies to its instructional program in 2005. Students may choose from business and fine arts, industrial and engineering, health and human services, and law and public service. Academy students share the same teachers for their core academic courses, such as language arts, math, science and social studies. They may shift to other academies for electives.

Since its initial construction, several additions and renovations to the 1956-era campus have been made. The vocational wing was expanded in 1960, along with the construction of a paved student parking lot. In early 1970, the "400 Hall" wing was added, the existing "300 Hall" was expanded with more science labs and classrooms, and the cafeteria was enlarged to include a snack bar area. Three years later, a new wing altered the front facade of the school, adding two new halls of classrooms (the "500" and "600" halls), new administrative offices, a teacher's lounge, a new band hall and more library space. Air conditioning was also added to most of the school around that time. An expansion of the gym (including the addition of a second, smaller gym) followed in 1978. In 1997, two classroom wings (the "A" and "B" halls) were added to the facade of the school. Additional locker rooms were included as part of this expansion. A new Fine Arts wing was added in 2010, including a new band hall and renovations for the choir and drama rooms. Several renovations on the older wings have also taken place over the years, including a major renovation of the cafeteria completed in 2009.

In November 2015, Aldine Independent School District voters overwhelmingly approved a $798 million bond package that includes two major projects at Aldine High School. Plans propose demolishing and rebuilding one existing wing of the school while also adding a new wing of classrooms.

== Notable alumni ==
- Billy Bates, former MLB second baseman
- Roger Pavlik, former MLB pitcher
- Darron Thomas, former AFL quarterback
