= Ron Robinson (baseball) =

American baseball player (born 1962)

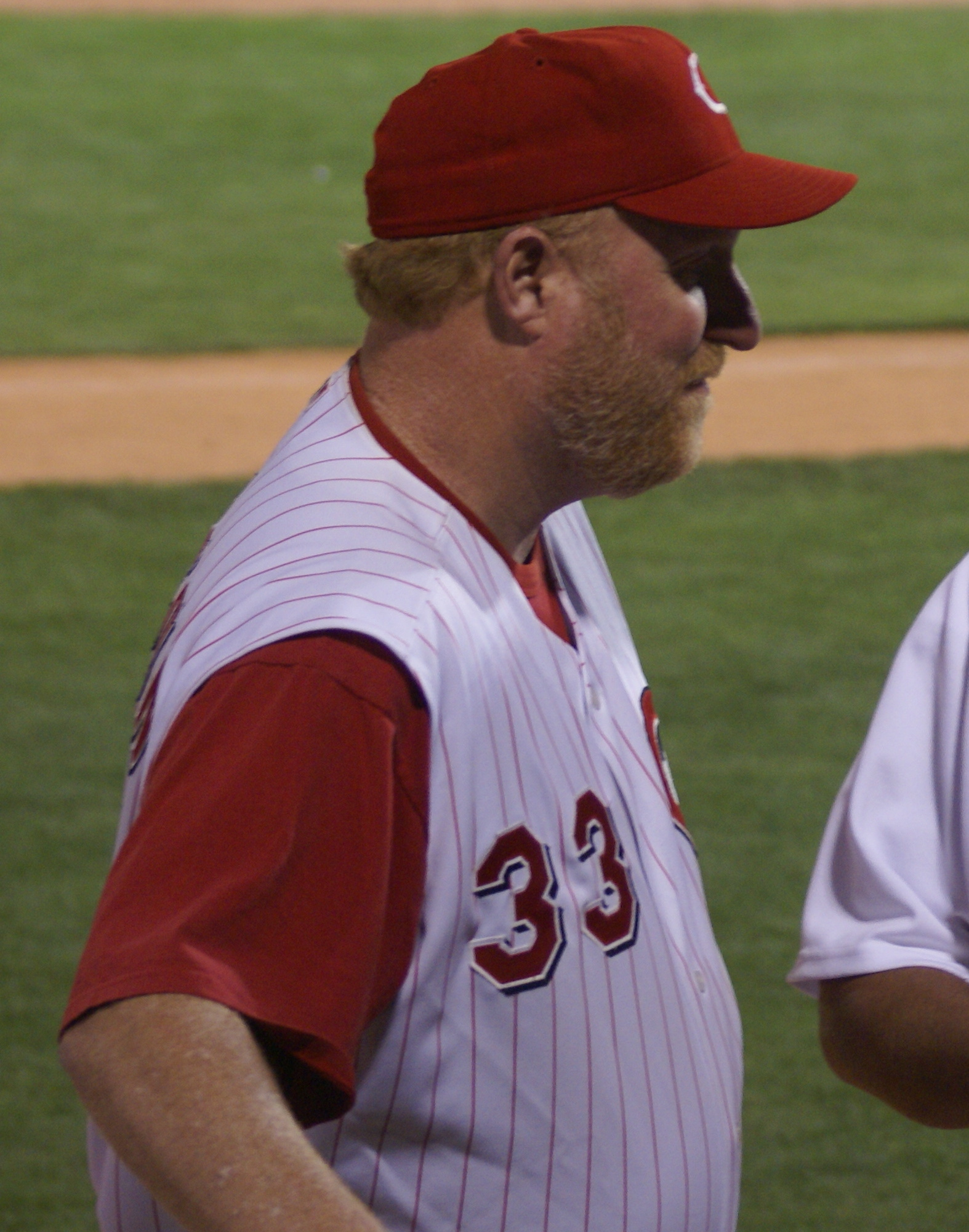
- Robinson in 2009
- Pitcher
- Born: March 24, 1962 (age 64); Exeter, California, U.S.
- Batted: Right Threw: Right

MLB debut
- August 14, 1984, for the Cincinnati Reds

Last MLB appearance
- July 2, 1992, for the Milwaukee Brewers

MLB statistics
- Win–loss record: 48–39
- Earned run average: 3.63
- Strikeouts: 473
- Stats at Baseball Reference

Teams
- Cincinnati Reds (1984–1990); Milwaukee Brewers (1990–1992)

Ronald Dean Robinson (born March 24, 1962) is an American former professional baseball pitcher. A right-hander, he played nine seasons in Major League Baseball for the Cincinnati Reds (1984–90) and the Milwaukee Brewers (1990–92).

== Early career ==
Robinson was drafted by the Reds out of Woodlake High School in Woodlake, California, with their first-round pick (19th overall) in the 1980 amateur draft. He spent the next four years moving through the Reds' farm system before making his major league debut on August 14, 1984.

== Major league career ==
=== Reds ===
Although he had been almost exclusively a starting pitcher in the minor leagues, his first major league appearance came as a relief pitcher, pitching the final two innings of a game against the St. Louis Cardinals. Four days later, he made his first major league start against the Chicago Cubs, but he recorded just one out while giving up seven runs. However, only one run was earned, as the Reds infield made three errors—two by shortstop Tom Foley -- behind him.

After being sent back to the bullpen for several games, Robinson got another chance at starting on September 2 against the Pittsburgh Pirates. This time, he was much more successful, as he recorded a complete game, giving up just seven hits to gain his first major league win, 7–1. He threw seven shutout innings in his next start, but left with the game still scoreless and did not get the win as the Reds won 1–0. He started three more games, finishing the season with a record of 1–2.

Robinson started the 1985 season back in the minor leagues with the Triple-A Denver Zephyrs. He was recalled in mid-May, and worked the rest of the season as a swingman, starting 12 games and relieving in 21.

In 1986, Robinson, who was nicknamed "the True Creature" by then-Reds manager Pete Rose, worked solely in relief, appearing in 70 games, going 10–3 with a 3.24 earned run average (ERA) and 14 saves. In 1987, he returned to the swingman role.

One of Robinson's most memorable starts came on May 2, 1988, when he came within one strike of throwing a perfect game against the Montreal Expos. With a single, Montreal's Wallace Johnson broke up what would have been the first perfect game in Reds history. According to teammate Tom Browning, Robinson was pitching with pain in his elbow so severe that he could not pick up a ball from the ground without squatting down to pick it up. Browning would throw the Reds' first perfect game four months later.

Robinson missed large chunks of both 1988 and 1989 due to injuries. After starting the 1990 season 2–2 with a 4.88 ERA in six games, the Reds traded him along with Bob Sebra to the Brewers for Glenn Braggs and Billy Bates on June 9, 1990. The trade helped propel the Reds to win the 1990 World Series.

=== Brewers ===
The season also wound up being a good one for Robinson, at least statistically. Between his stints with the Reds and the Brewers, Robinson set career highs in wins and innings pitched, while recording seven of his eight career complete games, including his only two major league shutouts. Overall, Robinson went 14–7 with a 3.26 ERA.

In 1991, Robinson started the third game of the season on April 11, pitching 4.1 innings, but in the process he suffered an elbow injury that cost him the rest of the season. He tried to come back in 1992, but pitched in just eight games for the Brewers before being forced to retire at age 30.

=== Career overview ===
Robinson posted a career win–loss record of 48–39 with a 3.63 ERA and 19 saves in 232 games, 102 starts and 800 innings pitched.

== Personal life ==
Robinson is married to high school sweetheart Becky Robinson. They have three children, Ronnie, Ryan and Megan. Robinson coaches baseball to students at his facility "The Dugout" in Visalia, California. Robinson also hosts Major League Baseball Players Alumni Association sponsored events such as the Legends for Youth Clinic, free programs to promote the game of baseball to youth using positive sports images and personalities.
