= Billy Bates (baseball) =

American baseball player (born 1963)

- Second baseman
- Born: December 7, 1963 (age 62); Houston, Texas, U.S.
- Batted: Left Threw: Right

MLB debut
- August 17, 1989, for the Milwaukee Brewers

Last MLB appearance
- October 2, 1990, for the Cincinnati Reds

MLB statistics
- Games played: 29
- Batting average: .125
- Hits: 6
- Stats at Baseball Reference

Teams
- Milwaukee Brewers (1989–1990); Cincinnati Reds (1990)

Career highlights and awards
- World Series champion (1990)

William Derrick Bates (born December 7, 1963) is an American former professional baseball second baseman and pinch runner who played in Major League Baseball (MLB) for the Milwaukee Brewers and the Cincinnati Reds. In 29 career games, Bates had a batting average of .125 with six hits, two runs batted in (RBI), 11 runs, and eight stolen bases. Though his defensive position was at second base, the Reds primarily used Bates as a pinch runner. After he scored the winning run in Game 2 of the 1990 World Series, Bates never played in MLB again.

Born in Houston, Bates attended the University of Texas and, in his freshman season, won the 1983 College World Series as a part of the Texas Longhorns baseball team. For the next two seasons, Bates was named to the College Baseball All-America Team, a team composed of the best collegiate baseball athletes in America. Drafted by Milwaukee in the fourth round of the 1985 MLB draft, he rose through the Brewers' farm system helping several of his minor league teams win their respective league titles. He made his MLB debut in 1989, after Milwaukee's starting second baseman Jim Gantner was injured. A trade in 1990 sent Bates to Cincinnati, where the Reds used him primarily as a pinch runner at the end of the regular season and into the postseason. Facing the Oakland Athletics in the World Series, Bates reached base on a pinch hit single against Dennis Eckersley and later scored the winning run in Game 2 as the Reds swept the Athletics four games to none. Following the World Series championship, the Reds re-signed Bates on a one-year contract, and he played for their Triple-A team. He spent the next year with the Chicago Cubs Triple-A affiliate, and last played exhibition baseball in 1995. After retiring, he worked as an equipment supplier in the oil and gas industry in Houston.

== Early life ==
William Derrick Bates was born on December 7, 1963, in Houston, Texas. The son of a paint foreman, he was the youngest of seven siblings. He attended Aldine High School, where he played baseball as an infielder and pitcher, basketball as a guard, and American football as a running back. In his junior year, the Aldine Mustangs defeated the Dickinson High School Gators 34–7 to win the Region III football championship; in the game, Bates recorded 93 yards on 14 carries. In baseball, the Texas High School Coaches Association named Bates as an All-Star to their South Team in June 1982. According to Bates, as a senior, Sam Houston State University and "several smaller schools" recruited him for baseball. After his senior season, a scout for the Houston Astros stated Bates would never play major college baseball, and suggested he attend a junior college. When the Philadelphia Phillies selected him in the eighth round of the 1982 MLB draft, Bates became the second player ever to be drafted out of Aldine. Instead of signing a professional contract with the Phillies, who offered Bates $38,000 or $38,500 to sign with the team (equivalent to $102,000 or $103,000 in 2020), Bates chose to attend the University of Texas at Austin.

=== Collegiate career ===
External images
- Bates, right, with teammate Mike Brumley, 1983
- Bates playing second base with the Longhorns in 1985
- Bates with a baseball bat, 1985

Bates enrolled at the University of Texas at Austin, and started at second base in his first year. The 1983 Longhorns finished the regular season with a 61–14 win–loss record and were ranked as the number one team in the nation by Collegiate Baseball Magazine. Though the College World Series (CWS) followed a double-elimination format, the Longhorns, who defeated the Mississippi State Bulldogs to represent the Central Regional in the CWS, remained undefeated and beat the Alabama Crimson Tide 4–3 to win the championship. After the series, Bates was named to the World Series All-Tournament team, composed of the best players from the series, and writers for Baseball America (BA) named him to their honorary first-team Freshman All-America team. He finished the season with a .296 batting average for the Longhorns.

During his sophomore season, Bates was named an American Baseball Coaches Association (ABCA) first-team All-American; with the accomplishment, Bates became the second Longhorn second baseman ever to make an All-American team, and the first since Pat Rigby in 1962. Texas finished with a 60–14 record and lost 3–1 to the Cal State Fullerton Titans in the final game of the 1984 CWS. Bates recorded 36 steals over the regular season and batted .272. His 62 walks and 74 games played both led the Longhorns. In 1985, Bates was a co-captain of the Texas team with David Denny, and was named a BA and an ABCA All-American with a .361 batting average as Texas finished at a 64–14 mark. In a June 1 CWS game against the Arizona Wildcats, Bates switched from hitting left to hitting right-handed in the middle of the game, and walked in the 7th inning and scored the game-tying run, and, in the 8th inning, hit a double that scored the go-ahead run. On June 5, in a game against the Miami Hurricanes, Bates hit two home runs, one from the right-hand side and one an inside-the-park home run from the left-hand side, as the Longhorns won 8–4; his two home runs tied a record for most home runs in a single CWS game. In a game against the Arkansas Razorbacks on June 8, Bates hit a triple in the bottom of the tenth inning and scored the winning run on a Doug Hodo single as the Longhorns defeated the Razorbacks 8–7. In the CWS finals, Texas lost twice against the Hurricanes, who advanced to the series from the loser's bracket, and lost the series. Over his career with the Longhorns, Bates batted .312 with a fielding percentage of .969.

Texas head coach Cliff Gustafson called Bates the best second baseman who played under him up to and including 1985. In 1996, a panel of sixty coaches, Division I Baseball Committee chairs, and media who covered the CWS named Bates to their all-decade team for the 1980s. As of 2018, Bates held the Texas Longhorns record for most career triples, with 20, most triples in a single season, with 13, and most runs scored in a single season, with 100. On June 3, the Milwaukee Brewers drafted Bates in the 4th round of the 1985 MLB draft. An anonymous scout outside the Brewers organization called Bates "confusing", and said "if you just put the stats on, and forget he's 5 feet 7 inches (170 cm), 155 pounds (70 kg), he's done remarkable things. But we go on percentages."

== Professional career ==
=== Rise to the majors ===
Bates began playing professionally for the Class A-Advanced Stockton Ports, a Brewers farm team which competed in the California League (CL). Though the Ports had seven future MLB pitchers on their roster, the team only had two future MLB position players: Bates and LaVel Freeman, who played in two games for the Brewers in 1989. Under manager Tom Gamboa, the Ports finished with an 82–63 record and reached the CL playoffs, which consisted of four teams playing in two best-of-five game series; the two winners advanced to play for the League championship. In the first series, the Ports defeated the Modesto A's, three games to one. In the championship, Stockton faced the Fresno Giants; with a 2–1 series lead, Stockton lost the final two games, and the Giants won the California League title. Bates batted .298, tied for fourth-best on the team, with 18 stolen bases in 59 games played.

In 1986, the Brewers promoted Bates to the Double-A El Paso Diablos. Bates' eight home runs and 75 runs batted in (RBI) became the highest of his career at any professional level. The Diablos finished the regular season with an 85–50 record as Bates led the club with 23 stolen bases but was caught stealing 10 times, also a team high. In the playoffs, the Diablos defeated the Jackson Mets four games to none to win the Texas League championship. Bates set a league record with three stolen bases in a single postseason game.

Before the 1987 season, Bates attempted to make the Brewers' Opening Day roster by playing in Milwaukee's spring training camp. A writer for the Milwaukee Journal Sentinel noted there was "a lot of recent publicity" around Bates, and another Journal Sentinel reporter said he "impressed many with his play". The Brewers sent Bates to their minor league camp in Peoria, Arizona, in March. He spent the entire season playing in Triple-A for the Denver Zephyrs of the American Association (AA) and played in 130 games, the second most on the Zephyrs to Brad Komminsk's 135. In a May 30 game against the Indianapolis Indians, Bates hit the game-winning single in the bottom of the 9th inning. He was named the AA's All-Star second baseman, and finished the season batting .316 with 51 stolen bases, second most in the AA to Gary Thurman of the Omaha Royals, who stole 58. His 117 runs scored also led a Denver club that won its final 11 games to finish 79–61, one game ahead of the Louisville Redbirds for the best record in the AA. In the league championship series, Denver lost to the Indians four games to one.

"He's still going to come to camp and be looked at. He has been impressive there once (1987) and not so impressive once (1988). He needs to go out this year and have a good season– do the things he's capable of doing offensively. He needs to re-establish himself."

— Brewers' assistant general manager Bruce Manno on Bates' future

Before the 1988 season, a prediction in the Fort Worth Star-Telegram stated that Bates might make the Brewers if Paul Molitor ended up as a third baseman or a designated hitter. In a Brewers' spring training game in early March, Bates committed two errors against the Chicago Cubs in the 11th inning, as the Cubs scored the winning run without recording a hit, but his 4th or 5th-inning single scored two runs. Bates was again cut from the MLB roster before the start of the 1988 season, as Milwaukee manager Tom Trebelhorn named Molitor as the Brewers' starting second baseman. Now in Triple-A, Bates had a five-RBI game against the Iowa Cubs on April 12 in a Zephyrs victory. In a June game against the Toledo Mud Hens, Bates hit a single and a double, with two walks and two runs scored, in a 5–1 Zephyrs win. Hindered throughout the season by a leg injury, Bates hit .258 with 29 stolen bases, a loss of 22 from a season ago, as the Zephyrs finished 72–62.

=== Milwaukee Brewers ===
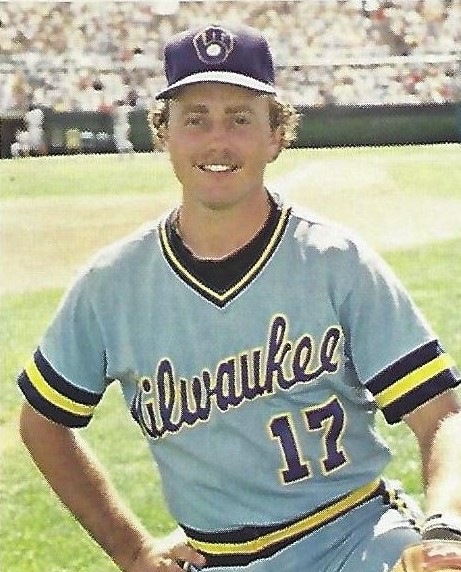
When Jim Gantner (pictured) re-signed with the Brewers, Bates was demoted to Denver.

After the 1988 season, the Brewers invited Bates to their spring training camp as a non-roster invitee as the 1989 season approached. Bates competed for a utility infielder position along with Gus Polidor, Edgar Díaz, and Juan Castillo, though Bates stated that he had played at shortstop and third base the previous year and Trebelhorn said he could contribute more in Triple-A. When 12-year Brewer second baseman Jim Gantner re-signed with the club, Bates was demoted to Denver, and the Milwaukee Journal Sentinel predicted that he would remain there due to his limited defensive versatility. Bates began the season with the Zephyrs and in July was named to the Triple-A All-Star Game. In a game against the New York Yankees on August 15, Gantner tore the medial collateral ligament in his left knee and was placed on the disabled list. Bates was called up as his replacement, though Milwaukee's general manager Harry Dalton stated he would aim to acquire a second baseman with MLB experience for the spot.

Dalton said that Bates was expected to join Milwaukee by the start of the game on August 16, adding "he won't be in the starting lineup, but he could play if necessary". Bates made his MLB debut on August 17 as a part of a double switch against the Boston Red Sox: when Dan Plesac replaced Tony Fossas as the pitcher, Bates entered the game for Polidor. Wade Boggs hit a ground ball to Bates, but Bates committed an error that allowed Boggs to reach base and Dwight Evans to advance to third base. No runs were scored in the inning and the Brewers won 8–4. Bates made his first career start two days later, and his first MLB hit came on August 20 when he reached base on an infield single. After his hit, Bates stole second base, and scored on a single by Robin Yount. While he was running out a base hit on August 22, Bates slipped on wet grass and suffered a separated right shoulder. The Brewers placed him on the 15-day disabled list; as a replacement, Milwaukee acquired Ed Romero from the Atlanta Braves. Bates returned to the team for three more games in September before the end of the season. Over seven MLB games, he batted .214 with three hits, three runs, and two steals; in Triple-A, Bates batted .273 with a slugging percentage of .322.

In late March, Bates was listed as the starting second baseman on Milwaukee's depth chart for the 1990 MLB season, although Dale Sveum was competing for the spot as well. Bates started at second on Opening Day against the Chicago White Sox, and despite a 2–1 Brewers' loss, Bates' play was complimented by Milwaukee Journal Sentinel writer Michael Bauman. Facing the Red Sox on April 14, Bates hit his only MLB extra base hit, a double, in the eighth inning, but committed two errors on defense. He later scored the go-ahead run on a Gary Sheffield double in a 9–5 Milwaukee victory. His second and final MLB RBI occurred on April 18: Rob Deer scored on his single, after Bates entered the game in the 6th inning to replace Sveum, who had been hit by a pitch an inning earlier. By April 27 Bates was hitting .103 over 29 at bats, as Molitor came off the DL and was expected to take over at second: Seth Livingstone of The Telegraph called the switch "merciful". Four days later, Bates was demoted to Denver, where he was the team's all-time leader in steals.

After batting .327 in 25 games with the Zephyrs, he was acquired along with Glenn Braggs by the Cincinnati Reds for Ron Robinson and Bob Sebra on June 9, 1990. Reds general manager Bob Quinn said he made the trade because, though "we felt comfortable with our pitching staff, we didn't feel comfortable with the right-handed hitters off the bench". Bates later stated he repeatedly asked the Brewers to trade him.

=== Cincinnati Reds ===
When he arrived with the Reds organization, Bates was assigned to the Triple-A Nashville Sounds of the AA. In a play-in game to determine the leader of the AA Eastern division, and thus the team that qualified for the playoffs, the Sounds defeated the Buffalo Bisons when Chris Jones hit a double that scored Bates in the eighteenth inning. The Sounds lost the ensuing series against the Western-champion Omaha Royals three games to two; Bates' season was not over, as the Reds added him to their MLB roster. For the Sounds, Bates batted .280 with 12 stolen bases and no home runs over 73 games played. In his Cincinnati debut on September 11, Bates came into the game as a pinch runner and scored on a Billy Doran hit. Doran, a second baseman, was hospitalized with back pain and spasms on September 29. Doctors performed an operation on October 3, which would hold him out of postseason play as Cincinnati won the National League (NL) West. In a move that surprised Bates, who had prepared to return to his Houston residence after the Reds' last regular-season game, the club added him to their postseason roster. He finished the regular season with eight appearances for the Reds, the majority of which came as a pinch runner.

In the 1990 NL Championship Series, the Reds faced the Pittsburgh Pirates in a best-of-seven game series. In Game 1, with the Reds down 4–3 in the bottom of the ninth inning, manager Lou Piniella put Bates in the game as a pinch runner for Ron Oester on first base. Eric Davis, at second, tried to steal third, and Bates followed to second; while Davis was safe, Pirates catcher Mike LaValliere threw Bates out by three feet. The Reds failed to score that inning and lost the game. Bates' next postseason appearance came in Game 3, when he pinch ran for Joe Oliver and scored a run as the Reds won 6–3. Cincinnati ultimately defeated the Pirates and moved on to the World Series, where they would play the Oakland Athletics for the league championship.

"Piniella sent Bates up to pinch-hit in the 10th. The little man promptly chopped a single off the concrete-hard turf and soon scored the winning run. In this old river town, Billy Bates was now a man for the ages, like Cookie Lavagetto, who hit that double off Bill Bevens, and Al Gionfriddo, who made that catch off DiMaggio, both in the 1947 Series for Brooklyn. Neither Lavagetto nor Gionfriddo ever played in the majors again. Nobody mentioned that to Billy Bates on Wednesday night."

— George Vecsey on Bates' legacy

In Game 1, the Reds defeated the Athletics 7–0. Bates did not play. In Game 2, after nine innings, the game remained tied, 4–4. Dennis Eckersley pitched for the Athletics for the bottom of the tenth, when Bates entered the game to pinch hit. Hitting coach Tony Pérez told him to "put the ball in play" and "run like Hell". Eckersley pitched Bates to an 0–2 ball–strike count when he hit the ball weakly to the third baseman and beat out an infield single; it was Bates' first hit against a right-handed pitcher in his MLB career. Chris Sabo advanced Bates to second on a single, and Oliver scored Bates on another single to win the game. Bates called the situation a "dream come true". The Reds defeated the Athletics four games to none and became World Series champions. Bates did not play in either of the last two games. As with all players on the World Series champion Reds, Bates received a World Series ring and visited the White House.

=== Later career ===
In January, Bates signed a one-year contract to stay with the Reds. In spring training, Cincinnati sent Bates to their minor league complex for reassignment to a team in the Reds' farm system. He started the season in Triple-A. Doran, still with a back injury, went on the DL in May, but Bates was not able to take his spot due to a back injury of his own. He played the entire 1991 season for the Sounds, where he batted .242 over 49 games with one stolen base out of three attempts, as the team finished with a 65–78 record. The Reds did not re-sign him. On May 7, 1992, Bates signed a contract with the Chicago Cubs and played for the Iowa Cubs, Chicago's Triple-A affiliate. Over 91 games played, he hit .241 with 62 hits and two stolen bases as Iowa finished 51–92. From 1992 to 1994, he worked for his father-in-law in a Houston pipe fabrication business. In February 1995, the Brewers invited Bates to their spring training camp as a possible replacement player due to the 1994–1995 MLB strike. When the strike ended, Bates returned to his wife and children in Houston instead of continuing his career elsewhere, citing physical reasons for his retirement. While playing in MLB, Bates stood at 5 feet 7 inches (170 cm) and weighed 155 pounds (70 kg). He batted left-handed, and threw right-handed. In 29 career games, Bates had a batting average of .125 with six hits, two runs batted in (RBI), 11 runs, and eight stolen bases.

== Personal life ==
In 1984, Bates was on the preliminary roster for baseball at the Olympic games, but did not make its final roster. He was a physical education major at the University of Texas in 1985. His teammates taunted him about his height: in Bates' first Milwaukee spring training camp, players threw a cap on the ground and addressed it as if it were Bates. During the MLB off-season, he worked as a substitute school teacher in Houston. Before the 1990 World Series, Bates raced against an unchained cheetah in a promotional event for the Cincinnati Zoo at Riverfront Stadium. The premise of the event was to show that a cheetah could defeat a human (with a five-second head start) in a 100-yard (91 m) race. The cheetah was supposed to chase a toy, but about halfway through the race, Bates' hat fell off, and instead, it went after the hat; Bates won the race. In 1991, Bates participated in the University of Texas' Varsity–Alumni game, a game between varsity baseball players and alumni players. In 2000, the University of Texas inducted him into their Men's Athletics Hall of Honor. As of 2010, Bates lived in Houston and worked for an equipment supplier in the oil and gas industry.
