= Harris County Common School District 29 =

School district in Texas

Location
- Harris County, Texas United States

District information
- Type: County school district
- Grades: 1 through 11
- Established: 1884
- Dissolved: 1935

Students and staff
- Students: 491 (1932)

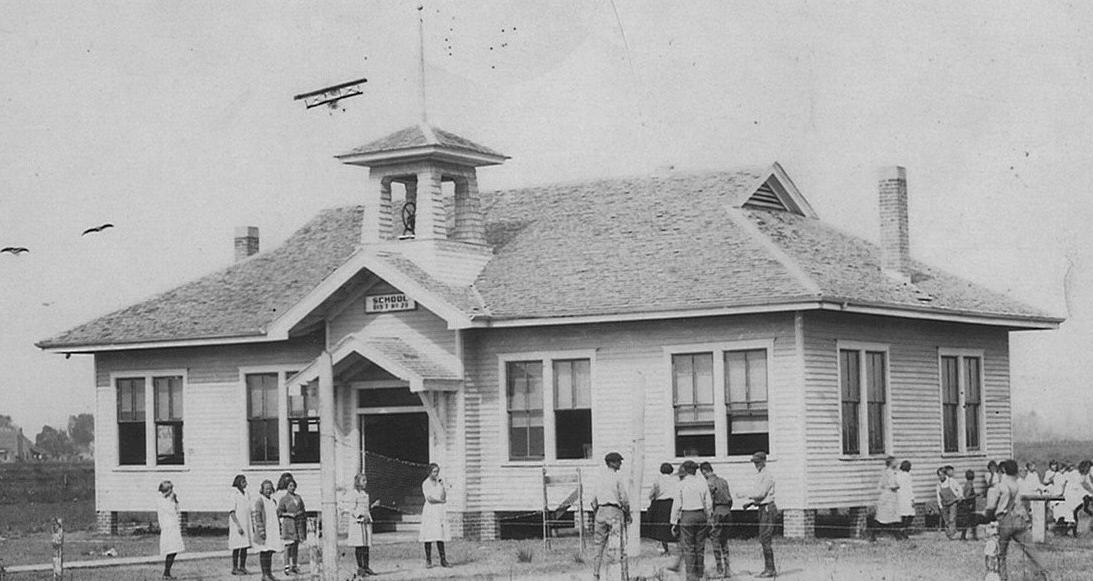
Aldine School House in 1921

Harris County Common School District 29 was a school district based in unincorporated north Harris County, Texas, United States. It served the communities of Aldine, Brubaker, Higgs and Westfield, all of which have now been absorbed into metropolitan Houston.

Throughout most of its history, the district operated small frame primary schoolhouses (grades 1-7) in each of the four communities as well as a school for black children in Higgs. For a brief time, it also ran a high school (grades 8 and 9) called the Hartwell School near Westfield. District 29 consolidated its white schools into one central facility in 1933, reinstated a high school program and two years later became the Aldine Independent School District by a popular vote.

== History ==
Harris County Commissioners Court created Common School District 29 on June 18, 1884, to serve the then sparsely populated sections of north Harris county south of Cypress Creek.

A 1934 map of Harris County school districts shows (1) the Aldine primary school near the intersection of Aldine-Bender (today's FM 525) and Aldine-Westfield, (2) the Brubaker primary school near the intersection of Blue Bell Road and East Montgomery (today's Airline Drive), (3) the Higgs primary school on Lee Road at Garners Bayou, just south of Humble-Westfield Road (today's FM 1960), (4) the Westfield primary school on the south side of Humble-Westfield Road (FM 1960), just west of Hardy, and (5) the then-closed Hartwell secondary school near the southwest corner of Humble-Westfield (FM 1960) and Aldine-Westfield Road.

On June 18, 1932, District 29 residents voted for a $40,000 bond to consolidate the four white primary schoolhouses in Aldine, Brubaker, Higgs and Westfield into one new centralized school. This two-story brick building would contain 12 classrooms and an auditorium. It would house grades 1-7 and allow the district to offer high school classes (grades 8 and 9) for the first time since the Hartwell School had closed.

When the 1932–33 school year began, high school students initially met at Memorial Baptist Church, located at East Montgomery Road (today's Airline Drive) and Gulf Bank, until the new building was completed. The new consolidated school opened in February 1933 at the intersection of Aldine-Bender Road and Aldine Westfield and immediately was filled to capacity. District 29 added grades 10 and 11 in 1933–34 to complete what was then considered a full high school program. Sometime in that same academic year, the school was named for S.M.N. Marrs, the late state superintendent of public instruction who had recently died. Marrs had championed rural education and financially weak school districts, such as District 29.

On May 4, 1935, voters in District 29 approved creation of the Aldine Independent School District (AISD) by a 128 to 28 margin. With that vote, District 29 ceased to exist.

== Primary Schools (for white students in grades 1-7) ==
- Aldine (a one-room schoolhouse later replaced by a two-room facility)
- Brubaker
- Higgs
- Westfield

== Primary Schools (for black students in grades 1-7) ==
- Higgs

== Secondary Schools (for white students in grades 8-9) ==
- Hartwell

== Consolidated Primary and Secondary Schools (for white students in grades 1-11) ==
- SMN Marrs
