= José Agustín Silvestre de los Santos =

- José Agustín Silvestre
- Born: May 5, 1952; La Romana, Dominican Republic
- Died: August 2, 2011 (aged 59); Sabana del Soco, San Pedro, Dominican Republic
- Cause of death: Gunfire, murder
- Resting place: Old Municipal Cemetery, La Romana, Dominican Republic
- Other names: José Silvestre, a.k.a. "Gajo"
- Occupations: TV host, Journalist
- Years active: TV, 1975–2011; magazine, 1982–2011
- Known for: exposing drug trafficking and corruption
- Notable work: "La Voz de la Verdad" (Caña TV)
- Children: 11 children

José Agustín Silvestre de los Santos (May 5, 1952 – 2 August 2011), also known as José Silvestre and by his nickname "Gajo", was a television host of the show "La Voz de la Verdad" for Caña TV and a magazine publisher of the same title in La Romana, Dominican Republic. Silvestre was killed because of his reporting about drug trafficking and not government retribution. According to the Committee to Protect Journalists, Silvestre was the third journalist murdered in the Dominican Republic since 1992.

== Personal Data ==
José Agustín Silvestre, age 59 at the time of his murder, was survived by his wife and 11 children. He is buried in the old municipal cemetery in La Romana, Dominican Republic.

== Career ==
Silvestre, a 36-year veteran of journalism and muckraker, hosted a television program "La Voz de la Verdad" (Translation: Voice of Truth) on regional TV station Caña TV since 1975 and edited the magazine named after the show since 1982. In 2010, he released a video of police brutality and murder that gained public attention.

A case of libel had already been brought against Silvestre for his report where he accused political figures and a priest, who were supposed to be part of anti-drug efforts, of being involved in drug trafficking. Silvestre had previously spent 6 days in jail in May and June before making bail. The prosecutor José Polanco Ramírez had brought libel charges against Silvestre and he was to appear in court the day on which he was killed.

== Death ==
Silvestre was abducted and murdered 2 August 2011 in connection with his reports about drug trafficking. The week before an attempt had been made on Silvestre's life. Police allege Matías Avelino Castro, also known as "Daniel" or "Daniel the Big Gun of Samana," ordered his murder. Silvestre was seized by at least four men outside a La Romana hotel near his home and was forced into a Ford Explorer. The attackers shot Silvestre three times to kill him and then dumped his corpse near a highway at a place called "El Peñón", which is near Sabana del Soco, San Pedro de Macorís, and is located between La Romana and Santo Domingo. Police say Castro, who also goes by the alias Joaquín Espinal Almeyda, wanted to avenge a mention in an article by Silvestre linking him to criminal activity, including the murder of two people in the eastern city of La Romana. Silvestre said before his murder that he would make an announcement on his TV program.

The National Police arrested five men and found guns and money around a week later. Police allege the five were responsible for the attack on Silvestre and placed them in preventative custody. At the time, Castro was not found by police.

According to a report by Diaro Libre on 28 September 2011, the SUV that the perpetrators used had come from an Avis car rental facility in La Caleta, Boca Chica, and the manager of that facility, who was in custody, died as he was being transferred from a detention center to a medical facility.

In December 2011, José Rijo, the Cincinnati Reds pitcher who won the World Series Most Valuable Player Award in 1990, was subpoenaed by the Dominican Republic's Anti-Money Laundering Unit in relation to his business dealings with Castro, who was also a hotel and advertising agency owner, and for any information about Silvestre's murder. German Miranda, who is the head of the unit, said an arrest warrant had been issued for Rijo. The next day, 14 December 2011, Rijo was interviewed by two sections of the Justice Ministry and confirmed his business relationship with Castro.

In February 2013, Castro was arrested in Spain by Interpol.

== Context ==
Murder of José Agustín Silvestre de los Santos
- Location: La Romana, Dominican Republic
- Date: August 2, 2011
- Deaths: 1
- Perpetrator: Samana drug cartel

José Agustín Silvestre de los Santos died for reporting about drug trafficking and the suspected person behind his murder, Matías Avelino Castro, has been alleged to belong to the Samaná drug cartel in the Dominican Republic. According to the CIA World Factbook, drug trafficking is an issue in the Dominican Republic. The Dominican Republic is a hub for drugs from South America or ecstasy from The Netherlands and Belgium. It is also a point of substantial money laundering activity, in particular for Colombian narcotics traffickers.

== Impact ==
Just prior to his death, Silvestre had reportedly prepared a publication naming political leaders, businessmen and government officials allegedly linked to international drug trafficking.

== Reactions ==
Irina Bokova, who is the director-general of UNESCO, said, "It is essential that a full investigation be carried out into this case for journalists to be able to continue exercising their basic human right of freedom of expression."

Amnesty International said the Dominican authorities must better protect journalists. "If it emerges that his death could have been prevented through better protection, the authorities must make that information public and ensure more is done in future to protect journalists at risk."
