= Bob Sebra =

American baseball player (1961–2020)

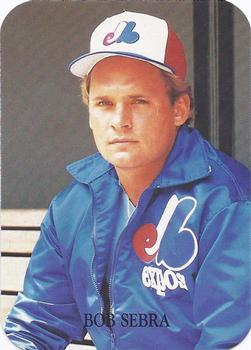
- Pitcher
- Born: December 11, 1961; Ridgewood, New Jersey, U.S.
- Died: July 22, 2020 (aged 58); Miami, Florida, U.S.
- Batted: Right Threw: Right

MLB debut
- June 26, 1985, for the Texas Rangers

Last MLB appearance
- June 30, 1990, for the Milwaukee Brewers

MLB statistics
- Win–loss record: 15–29
- Earned run average: 4.71
- Strikeouts: 281
- Stats at Baseball Reference

Teams
- Texas Rangers (1985); Montreal Expos (1986–1987); Philadelphia Phillies (1988–1989); Cincinnati Reds (1989); Milwaukee Brewers (1990)

Robert Bush Sebra (December 11, 1961 – July 22, 2020) was an American professional baseball pitcher, who played in Major League Baseball (MLB) for the Texas Rangers, Montreal Expos, Philadelphia Phillies, Cincinnati Reds, and Milwaukee Brewers from 1985 to 1990.

== Career ==
Sebra played prep baseball at Gloucester Catholic High School in New Jersey. He then attended the University of Nebraska, and in 1981 he played collegiate summer baseball with the Wareham Gatemen of the Cape Cod Baseball League. He was drafted by the Texas Rangers in the fifth round of the 1983 Major League Baseball draft.

Over the course of his big league career, Sebra pitched in 94 games, 52 of them as a starting pitcher. Included among Sebra's MLB highlights are 2 shutouts, a 1–0 and a 2–0, accomplished while with Montreal.

On July 26, 1986, Sebra became the last pitcher ever to give up a walk-off win where the winning run was scored by the other team's manager. He hit Cincinnati Reds player/manager Pete Rose with a pitch, then issued a bases loaded walk to score Rose.

Sebra was primarily a starting pitcher, but on July 28, 1989, he picked up his lone career save. He pitched a scoreless 17th inning to close out a 4–2 Reds victory over Atlanta. He was traded along with Ron Robinson from the Reds to the Milwaukee Brewers for Glenn Braggs and Billy Bates on June 9, 1990.

Sebra's final pitch in the majors ignited a major brawl between the Brewers and Mariners on June 30, 1990. He hit Tracey Jones, then later charged home plate to confront Jones. Sebra admitted he intended to hit Jones. Sebra received a 5-game suspension but had been sent down to the minors before receiving his punishment.

Sebra pitched in Triple-A through the 1993 season. He then attempted a comeback with the Somerset Patriots of the Atlantic League in 1998.

== Death ==
Sebra died at the age of 58 on July 22, 2020, after spending a year in intensive care at Jackson Memorial Hospital in Miami, Florida, as a result of multiple organ failure. He had undergone a liver transplant several years earlier.
