= Glenn Braggs =

American baseball player (born 1962)

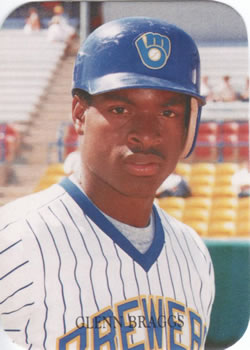
- Outfielder
- Born: October 17, 1962 (age 63); San Bernardino, California, U.S.
- Batted: Right Threw: Right

Professional debut
- MLB: July 18, 1986, for the Milwaukee Brewers
- NPB: 1993, for the Yokohama BayStars

Last appearance
- MLB: September 10, 1992, for the Cincinnati Reds
- NPB: 1996, for the Yokohama BayStars

MLB statistics
- Batting average: .257
- Home runs: 70
- Runs batted in: 321

NPB statistics
- Batting average: .300
- Home runs: 91
- Runs batted in: 260
- Stats at Baseball Reference

Teams
- Milwaukee Brewers (1986–1990); Cincinnati Reds (1990–1992); Yokohama BayStars (1993–1996)

Career highlights and awards
- World Series champion (1990)

Glenn Erick Braggs (born October 17, 1962) is an American former Major League Baseball and Nippon Professional Baseball outfielder and designated hitter. Braggs was a member of the Cincinnati Reds team that defeated the Oakland Athletics in the 1990 World Series. He is an alumnus of the University of Hawaii at Manoa.

== Major League Baseball career ==
Drafted by the Milwaukee Brewers in the 2nd round of the 1983 Major League Baseball draft, Braggs made his major league debut with the Brewers on July 18, 1986. Starting in left field and batting fifth, Braggs went 1-4 in a 6-1 road loss to the Oakland Athletics. His first career hit was a sixth-inning single off Joaquin Andujar. He hit the first of his 70 career home runs on August 2, 1986 with a two-run shot off Charlie Hough.

He had his best season in 1989, hitting 15 home runs with 66 runs batted in (RBI) and 17 stolen bases with a .247 batting average.

After beginning the season batting .248 with three homers and 13 RBI in 37 games, he was acquired along with Billy Bates by the Reds from the Brewers for Ron Robinson and Bob Sebra on June 9, 1990. He played a key role as the Reds advanced to the National League playoffs. In 231 plate appearances, he hit six home runs with 28 RBI and a .299 average.

In the 1990 NLCS against the Pirates, he went 1-for-5 but had a huge impact on the series. In the top of the ninth inning of game six, with one on and one out, the Reds clung to a 2–1 lead. Braggs robbed Carmelo Martinez of a possible go-ahead home run, reaching up and snagging a long fly as his back hit the wall, for the second out of the inning. The Reds advanced to the World Series.

In the World Series, he went 0-for-4 but had two RBI and one base on balls as the Reds won the World Series over the heavily favored Oakland Athletics.

He played two more seasons for the Reds, appearing in his final MLB game on September 10, 1992, where he hit a home run in his final at bat.

Braggs was known for his upper body strength, and in fact once snapped a bat on a check swing. When he stopped his swing, he put so much force on the bat to stop it that it sheared off just above the grip, without ever touching the ball. In the second inning of Game 4 of the 1990 World Series, he swung so hard at a pitch from the A's Dave Stewart that the bat broke on his back on the follow-through.

== Personal life ==
Glenn Braggs was married to the singer Cindy Herron, also known as Cindy Herron-Braggs, of the R&B female group En Vogue for almost 29 years. They have four children. In early 2022, Herron filed for divorce, citing “irreconcilable differences” as the reason for the breakup. She was declared legally single by January 2023. He is a real estate agent in the Los Angeles area, and is also vegan.
