= Harris County Housing Authority =

Harris County Housing Authority (HCHA) is the low-income housing and public housing authority of Harris County, Texas in Greater Houston. Its headquarters are in southern Houston. It mainly serves areas outside of Houston, as the Houston Housing Authority serves that city.

In 2017, due to a decrease in the federal government budgets funding housing choice vouchers, it canceled some and stopped the issuance of new ones.

== Public housing ==
The HCHA has eight senior housing properties owned and/or operated by the agency. As of 2018 four of them are in the Texas State Highway 249/Farm to Market Road 1960 area. These include (and are located in unincorporated areas unless otherwise specified):

- Baybrook Park (City of Webster)
- Cornerstone Village
- Cypresswood Estates
- Louetta Village
- Magnolia Estates - northeast Harris County
- Primrose at Heritage Park - northwest Harris County
- Sierra Meadows
- The Retreat at Westlock
  - The complex, in the SH249/1960 area, has 166,762 square feet (15,492.7 m^{2}) of space, and has 140 units. Residents may be aged 65 or older. HCHA completed its plans for the project in April 2015. The complex began taking occupants in May 2017, and completion was scheduled by fall 2017. Prior to the development of the complex, residents of area subdivisions expressed opposition to the addition of low income housing in their areas. In January 2015 Texas House of Representatives member Allen Fletcher sent the HCHA a letter stating his opposition to the housing even though he sent a letter in support of the housing in March 2013, and Texas House member Debbie Riddle tried to frustrate attempts within the House to reduce the amount of obstruction of public housing from politicians. The HCHA set a ban on visitors under age 62 from being present at The Retreat at Westlock for periods longer than three days each, due to the opposition from the surrounding areas; it is, as of 2017, the only HCHA property with this rule.

The HCHA owns and/or operates a single housing complex for families, Waterside Court, in an unincorporated area in northwest Harris County, in the SH249/1960 area. It has 118 housing units. Residents of this property are in the Aldine Independent School District, and are zoned to Keeble Early Childhood/Prekindergarten/Kindergarten (EC/PK/KG) School, Thomas Gray Elementary School, Stovall Middle School, Aldine 9th Grade School, and Aldine High School.
