= José Rijo =

Dominican baseball player (born 1965)

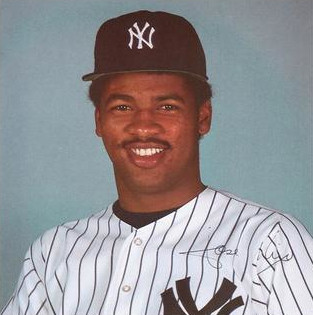
- Rijo in 1984
- Pitcher
- Born: May 13, 1965 (age 61); San Cristóbal, Dominican Republic
- Batted: Right Threw: Right

MLB debut
- April 5, 1984, for the New York Yankees

Last MLB appearance
- September 28, 2002, for the Cincinnati Reds

MLB statistics
- Win–loss record: 116–91
- Earned run average: 3.24
- Strikeouts: 1,606
- Stats at Baseball Reference

Teams
- New York Yankees (1984); Oakland Athletics (1985–1987); Cincinnati Reds (1988–1995, 2001–2002)

Career highlights and awards
- All-Star (1994); World Series champion (1990); World Series MVP (1990); NL strikeout leader (1993); Cincinnati Reds Hall of Fame

José Antonio Rijo Abreu (born May 13, 1965) is a Dominican former pitcher in Major League Baseball (MLB) who spent the majority of his career with the Cincinnati Reds (1988–1995 and 2001–2002). Signed by the New York Yankees as an amateur free agent in 1980, Rijo made his MLB debut with them in 1984, and also played in MLB for the Oakland Athletics. He pitched and batted right-handed, stood 6 feet 1 inch (1.85 m) tall, and weighed 200 pounds (91 kg) during his playing career.

The most notable success of Rijo's career came as a member of the Reds, where each year as a starting pitcher from 1988 to 1993, he posted an earned run average (ERA) below 3.00. He led the Reds to the 1990 World Series title and was named World Series MVP as Cincinnati swept the defending champion Oakland A's.

In 1993, he led the National League in strikeouts and Wins Above Replacement (WAR), at 10.6. He was named to the All-Star Game in 1994.

Elbow injuries sidelined Rijo for most of the 1995 season and the entire 1996−2000 seasons. In 2001, he returned to the Reds as a relief pitcher. By doing so, he became the first player to appear in a game after receiving a Baseball Hall of Fame vote since Minnie Miñoso in 1976.

Rijo won the Tony Conigliaro Award in 2002. He retired after that season, and was elected to the Cincinnati Reds Hall of Fame in 2005.

== Playing career ==
Plagued by injuries during his career, he left the major leagues at age 30 before returning six years later for 1 1/2 seasons. Rijo is perhaps best known for his performance in the 1990 World Series, when he recorded two victories in a four-game sweep over the defending champion Oakland A's, including a two-hitter in the final Game Four. Rijo's performance earned him the World Series MVP Award as the Reds won their first championship in 14 years.

When Rijo broke into the majors with the New York Yankees in 1984, he was 18 years old and the youngest player in either league. The previous year, he'd had a 15–5 record in the Florida League with a 1.68 ERA. But he did not have a good rookie season, and some observers (notably ESPN) commented that Yankee owner George Steinbrenner had orchestrated the call-up, hoping to create a phenom along the lines of the crosstown Mets' 1984 rookie sensation Dwight Gooden. On December 5, 1984, the Yankees traded Rijo with Eric Plunk, Tim Birtsas, Jay Howell, and Stan Javier to the Oakland Athletics for Rickey Henderson, Bert Bradley, and cash.

While with the Oakland Athletics, he struck out 16 Seattle Mariners on April 16, 1986, setting a club record. In his next start, he struck out 14 in a 2-hitter against the same Mariners organization, despite losing the game. But his time in Oakland was otherwise largely nondescript, with just 17 wins in three seasons. Even so, Rijo was still considered enough of a prospect for the Reds to acquire him in exchange for aging slugger Dave Parker, who'd had 338 runs batted in over the previous three seasons.

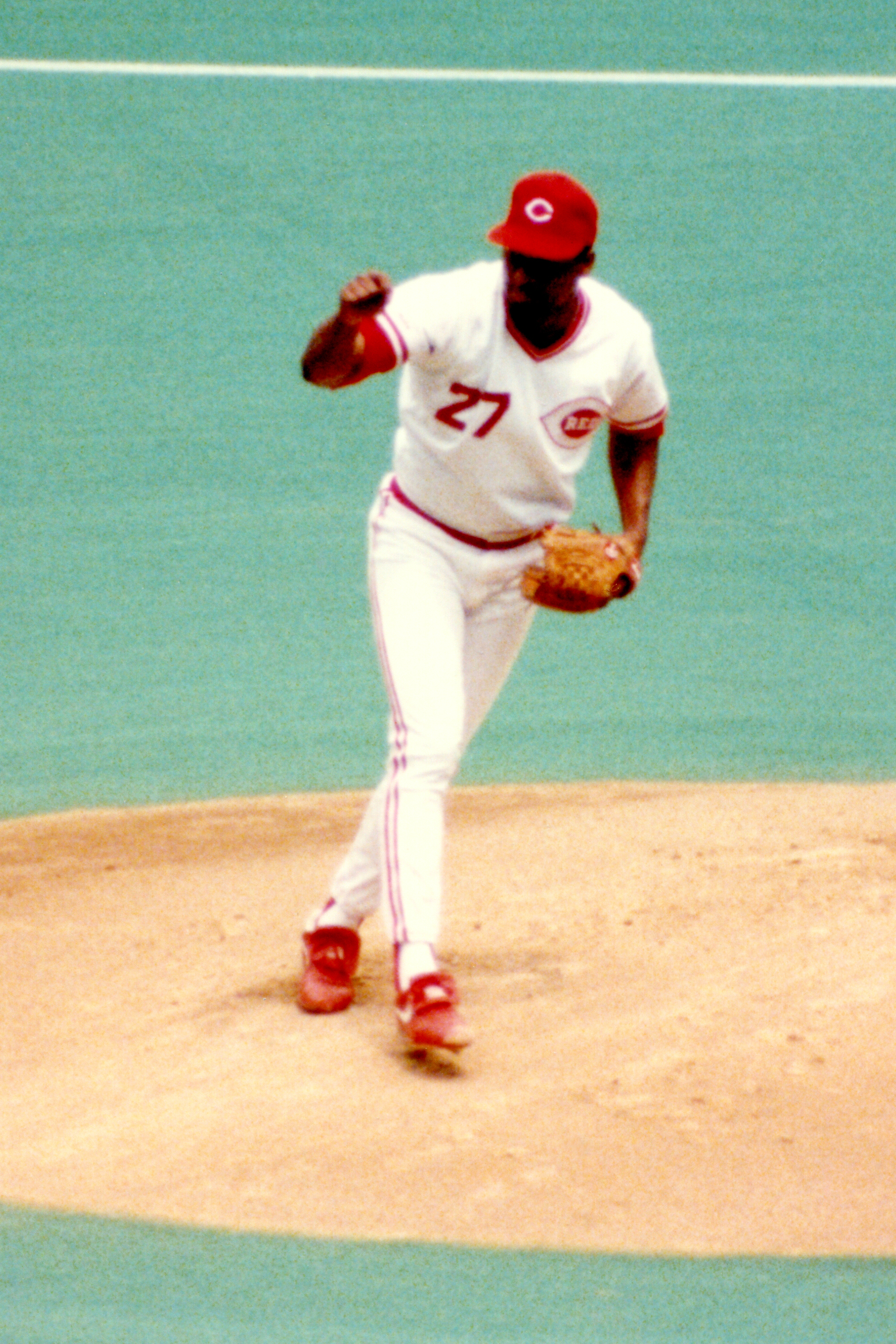
Rijo pitching for Cincinnati in 1990

Rijo's age eventually caught up to his talent. He was a member of the National League All-Star Team in 1994. Rijo also led the league in 1993 and 1994 in games started. He led the NL in 1993 in strikeouts and strikeouts per nine innings, and in 1991 he led the NL in winning percentage.

Rijo was 3–0 in the 1990 postseason, including two World Series wins against Oakland, the team that had traded him away three years before. After winning Game One by a 7–0 score, he shut down the A's on two hits in Game Four (both in the first inning), ending the Series with a 0.59 earned run average and 15 strikeouts in 15 1/3 innings. It was the only postseason experience of his entire career.

Rijo pitched a one-hitter against the Colorado Rockies in 1993. The year after his All-Star season (1995), Rijo was sidelined with a serious elbow injury. Despite several comeback attempts, his elbow troubles kept him out of baseball for five full years. Rijo made an unexpected comeback to the game in 2001, returning to Cincinnati as a reliever. In doing so, Rijo became the first major league player to appear in a game after having received a Baseball Hall of Fame vote since Minnie Miñoso (who received six Hall of Fame votes in 1969) appeared for the Chicago White Sox in 1976 and 1980. In 2008, Rijo was again on the Hall of Fame ballot; he received no votes.

In 2002, his final season, Rijo received the Tony Conigliaro Award. He made a handful of starts that year, including a win in his first start since 1995, and the last game at Riverfront Stadium. Rijo was on the 2003 Reds roster, but he suffered an elbow injury causing him to miss the entire season, and retired soon thereafter.

== Life after retirement ==
Rijo used to work as a special assistant to general manager Jim Bowden of the Washington Nationals baseball team. Starting in February 2009, he took a leave of absence from his position after it was discovered that one of Rijo's scouting finds, shortstop Esmailyn Gonzalez, was actually named Carlos David Alvarez Lugo and was four years older than the Nationals believed when they signed him. On February 25, Rijo was dismissed from the Nationals' organization and his Dominican baseball academy closed down. In 2013, the Nationals filed suit against an insurance company to recoup $1 million of the signing bonus; Lugo had testified that "he kicked back $300,000 of his bonus to Jose Rijo" (in January 2011 Rijo had denied receiving any money).

In December 2011, the Dominican Republic's Anti-Money Laundering sought to question Rijo in relation to his business dealings with Matías "Daniel" Avelino Castro, a drug trafficker who was alleged to be the mastermind of the murder of journalist José Agustín Silvestre de los Santos. In July 2012, he was charged with money laundering; according to a prosecutor, "about 80 percent of the assets of fugitive drug suspect Avelino Castro were in Rijo's name", including two hotels. Prosecutors did not issue an arrest warrant, but asked a court to order Rijo to stay in the country. A hotel Rijo claimed he owned, formerly owned by Castro, had tested positive for cocaine.

Rijo was once married to Juan Marichal's daughter, Rosie.

Rijo had a supporting role in the 2008 baseball film Sugar.

Rijo became eligible for the National Baseball Hall of Fame in 2001. 75% of the vote was necessary for induction, and 5% was necessary to stay on the ballot. He received 0.2% of the vote, and was dropped off the BBWAA ballot. He again became eligible for the Hall of Fame in 2008 since he played in 2001 after a six-year hiatus. He received no votes and fell off the ballot.

== Awards and achievements ==
Awards

- MLB Pitcher of the Month (September 1992)
- 2× MLB Pitcher of the Month (May 14, 1989; September 23, 1990)
- Tony Conigliaro Award (2002)

National League statistical leader

- 2× Games started leader (1993, 1994)
- Strikeouts leader (1993)
- Strikeouts per 9 innings pitched leader (1993)
- Walks plus hits per inning pitched leader (1991)
- Winning percentage leader (1991)
- Wins Above Replacement leader (1993)

American and National League statistical top ten

- 6× Adjusted ERA+ (1988, 1990−94)
- 6× Earned run average (1988, 1990−94)
- 3× Games started (1992−94)
- 2× Innings pitched (1993, 1994)
- 6× Strikeouts (1986, 1990−94)
- 7× Strikeouts per 9 innings pitched leader (1986, 1988, 1990−94)
- 3× Walks plus hits per inning pitched (1991−93)
- 3× Wins (1990−92)
- 4× Wins Above Replacement (1990−93)

== See also ==
- List of Major League Baseball annual strikeout leaders
- List of Major League Baseball players from the Dominican Republic
