= Ron Oester =

American baseball player (born 1956)

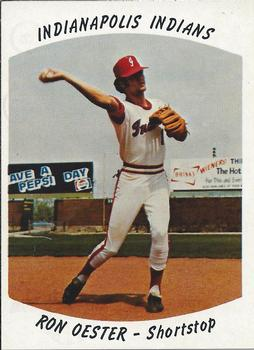
- Second baseman
- Born: May 5, 1956 (age 70); Cincinnati, Ohio, U.S.
- Batted: Switch Threw: Right

MLB debut
- September 10, 1978, for the Cincinnati Reds

Last MLB appearance
- October 3, 1990, for the Cincinnati Reds

MLB statistics
- Batting average: .265
- Home runs: 42
- Runs batted in: 344
- Stats at Baseball Reference

Teams
- Cincinnati Reds (1978–1990)

Career highlights and awards
- World Series champion (1990); Cincinnati Reds Hall of Fame

Ronald John Oester (born May 5, 1956) is an American former Major League Baseball second baseman. He played his entire MLB career with the Cincinnati Reds from 1978 to 1990. He is a native of Cincinnati.

== Baseball career ==
Drafted by the Cincinnati Reds in the 9th round of the 1974 MLB amateur draft, Oester made his debut with the Reds on September 10, 1978, and appeared in his final game on October 3, 1990. He finished fourth in the Rookie of the Year voting in 1980.

Oester was one of the few major leaguers who did not wear batting gloves. He perpetually developed blisters on his hands, and according to teammates, they would develop into deep wounds on his palms.

In 1984 Oester had a career-best, 21-game hitting streak. In 1985 he had a .295 batting average, a career high.

On July 5, 1987, during a Mets-Reds game at Riverfront Stadium, the New York Mets' Mookie Wilson slid hard into second base during a double-play attempt. During the slide, Oester, who was playing second, collided with Wilson. His cleats got caught in the turf, and he tore his left ACL. Oester did not return to action until July 16, 1988. For his comeback from this injury, Oester earned the Hutch Award.

Oester was a member of the Cincinnati Reds team that defeated the Oakland Athletics in the 1990 World Series. Although he lost the starting second baseman job to Mariano Duncan that season, Oester was one of the team's top pinch hitters, hitting .299 that season and going 2-for-4 (.500) in the postseason. His final major league plate appearance was a hit that drove in Joe Oliver in Game 2 of the 1990 World Series, keeping the Reds in the game, a game they would go on to win in 10 innings, 5–4.

Bill James described him as "a quiet, efficient player who was always overlooked". Oester ended his career with a WAR of 10.9 and a batting average of .265.

== Post career ==
In 2001, while serving as the Reds third base coach, Oester was offered the job of manager of the club. As the offer was below the market average, Oester turned it down.

Withrow High School, which Oester attended, renovated and renamed its field in honor of him.

Oester was inducted into the Cincinnati Reds Hall of Fame in 2014

== See also ==
- List of Major League Baseball players who spent their entire career with one franchise
