= School transitions =

School transitions are the conversions students go through as they change schools throughout their lives. These transitions play a major role in the development of young people's decisions and serve as a milestone that can direct them in a number of ways. There are two main types of school transitions: normative school transitions and non-normative school transitions or transfers.

== Normative school transitions ==
Normative school transitions refer to the transitions of students from elementary school to middle school and from middle school to high school. As each transition occurs, the student generally undergoes many different changes, ranging from a difference in the size of the school, to the change in friends that one meets. Each student adapts to normative transitions differently, and there are a multitude of things that influence how easily or poorly they adapt. Race, gender, location, age, and academic ability all affect the transition. According to Karen Könings from Maastricht University, the expectations students have when arriving at a new school are widely influential in determining how they will perform. Often, it is within the first few weeks that students build the relationships and networks that collectively form these expectations.

== Non-normative school transitions/transfers ==
School transfers refer to any transition in schooling when a student is moved from one school to another between normative transfers. These transitions are less common than normative school transitions but still frequently occur. Often, people end up making non-normative school transitions by participating in what is called the school choice program. This is a policy used by school systems that spend public funds to give parents and students more of a say in their education. School choice often gives participants a variety of different types of schools to choose from, including charter schools, magnet programs, and tax credits for private schools. Choice schooling is associated with increased private school scores, but its effects on public schools tend to show less improvement. Some believe that these problems in the public schools are actually a sign of increasing inequality. While choice schooling makes it both financially and institutionally easier for parents to choose where they would like their student to attend school, many of the low-income families do not have the resources to send their children to the farther away magnet schools or private schools. In most cases, the lower-class parents send their children to the nearest school because there is a bus to pick them up. The wealthier families, on the other hand, tend to take advantage of the choice program and can attend the private schools and higher-rated public schools outside of the city.

== See also ==
- High school (North America)
- Homeschooling
- Middle school
- Primary school
- School
- School choice
- Secondary school
