= Aldine, Texas =

- Unincorporated community Census designated place
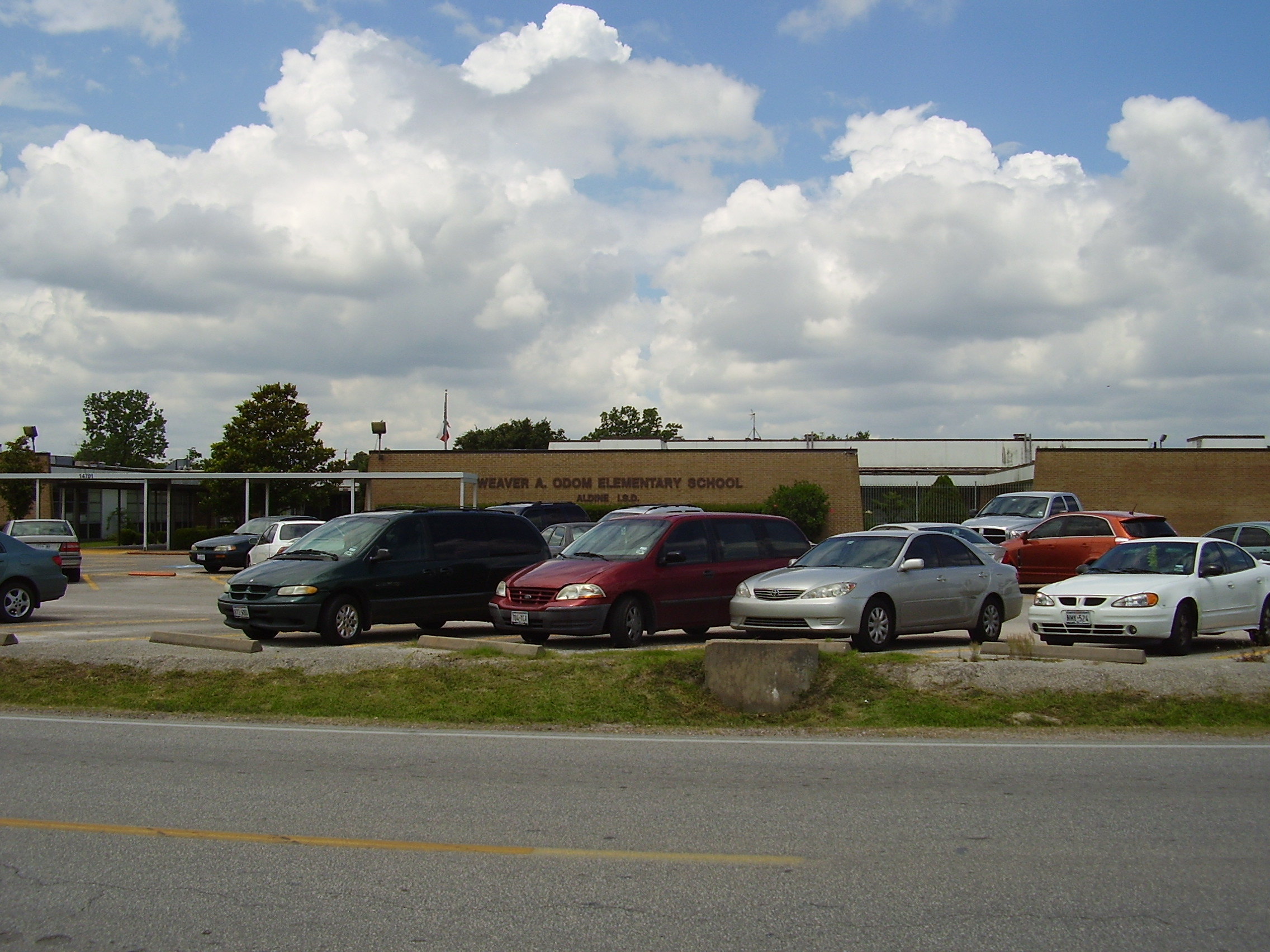
- Odom Elementary School

- Location in Harris County and the state of Texas
- Coordinates: 29°55′9″N 95°22′47″W
- Country: United States
- State: Texas
- County: Harris

Area
  - Total: 7.92 sq mi (20.50 km^{2})
  - Land: 7.90 sq mi (20.46 km^{2})
  - Water: 0.019 sq mi (0.05 km^{2})

Population (2020)
  - Total: 15,999
  - Density: 2,025/sq mi (782.0/km^{2})
- Time zone: UTC-6 (Central (CST))
  - Summer (DST): UTC-5 (CDT)
- FIPS code: 48-01696

Aldine (/ˈɔːldiːn/ AWL-deen) is a census-designated place (CDP) in unincorporated central Harris County, Texas, United States, located within the extraterritorial jurisdiction of Houston. The population was 15,999 at the 2020 census. The community is located on the Hardy Toll Road, Union Pacific Railroad, and Farm to Market Road 525. The Aldine area is near Houston's George Bush Intercontinental Airport, the second largest aviation facility in Texas.

== History ==
Aldine, built on the International–Great Northern Railroad, was named after a local farm family. A post office operated in Aldine from 1896 to 1935; after 1935, mail was delivered from Houston. In 1914 Aldine included two general stores, a fig preserver, and several poultry breeders and several dairymen. The population briefly reached 100 in 1925. In the 1930s and 1940s the population decreased to between thirty and forty residents. The Aldine Independent School District was integrated by federal order in 1965. Aldine, with renewed population growth in the 1970s, had 12,623 residents in 1986 and 11,133 residents in 1990.

Over 60% of the houses in the Aldine area were damaged by Hurricane Harvey in 2017. In September 2018 the Houston Chronicle wrote that the people there were "still recovering".

== Geography ==
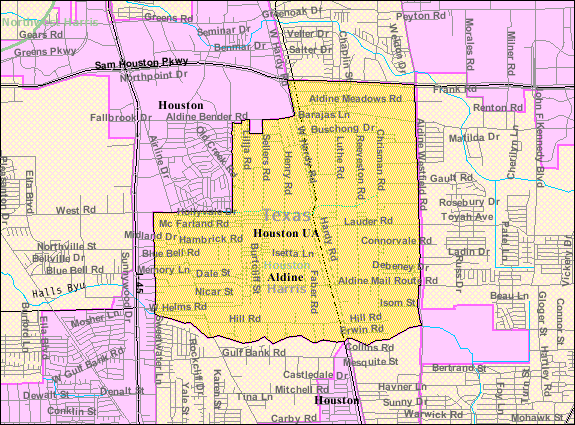
Map of the Aldine CDP

According to the United States Census Bureau, the CDP has a total area of 7.92 square miles (20.50 km^{2}), of which 7.90 square miles (20.46 km^{2}) is land and 0.019 square miles (0.05 km^{2}), or 0.22%, is water.

=== Climate ===
Climate data for Aldine
Month	Jan	Feb	Mar	Apr	May	Jun	Jul	Aug	Sep	Oct	Nov	Dec	Year
Mean daily maximum °F (°C)	60 (16)	64 (18)	71 (22)	78 (26)	84 (29)	89 (32)	93 (34)	93 (34)	87 (31)	80 (27)	71 (22)	64 (18)	77 (25)
Mean daily minimum °F (°C)	41 (5)	42 (6)	50 (10)	57 (14)	64 (18)	69 (21)	71 (22)	71 (22)	68 (20)	57 (14)	48 (9)	42 (6)	55 (13)
Average precipitation inches (mm)	3.7 (94)	3 (76)	3.5 (89)	3.5 (89)	5.3 (130)	5.1 (130)	3.2 (81)	3.7 (94)	4.5 (110)	4.7 (120)	3.9 (99)	3.6 (91)	47.7 (1,210)
Source: Weatherbase

== Demographics ==
Historical population
Census	Pop.	Note	%±
1980	12,623		—
1990	11,133		−11.8%
2000	13,979		25.6%
2010	15,869		13.5%
2020	15,999		0.8%
U.S. Decennial Census; 1850–1900 1910; 1920 1930 1940; 1950 1960 1970; 1980 1990 2000; 2010 2020

Aldine first appeared as a census designated place in the 1980 United States census.

=== Racial and ethnic composition ===
Aldine CDP, Texas – Racial and ethnic composition Note: the US Census treats Hispanic/Latino as an ethnic category. This table excludes Latinos from the racial categories and assigns them to a separate category. Hispanics/Latinos may be of any race.
Race / Ethnicity (NH = Non-Hispanic)	Pop 2000	Pop 2010	Pop 2020	% 2000	% 2010	% 2020
White alone (NH)	4,731	2,026	1,288	33.84%	12.77%	8.05%
Black or African American alone (NH)	798	403	347	5.71%	2.54%	2.17%
Native American or Alaska Native alone (NH)	17	13	27	0.12%	0.08%	0.17%
Asian alone (NH)	466	279	210	3.33%	1.76%	1.31%
Native Hawaiian or Pacific Islander alone (NH)	4	0	2	0.03%	0.00%	0.01%
Other race alone (NH)	5	24	36	0.04%	0.15%	0.23%
Mixed race or Multiracial (NH)	83	88	105	0.59%	0.55%	0.66%
Hispanic or Latino (any race)	7,875	13,036	13,984	56.33%	82.15%	87.41%
Total	13,979	15,869	15,999	100.00%	100.00%	100.00%

=== 2020 census ===
As of the 2020 census, Aldine had a population of 15,999. The median age was 30.3 years. 31.2% of residents were under the age of 18 and 8.2% were 65 years of age or older. For every 100 females, there were 108.7 males, and for every 100 females age 18 and over there were 110.0 males.

100.0% of residents lived in urban areas, while 0.0% lived in rural areas.

There were 4,438 households in Aldine, including 3,436 family households. Of all households, 50.0% had children under the age of 18 living in them, 49.1% were married-couple households, 21.3% were households with a male householder and no spouse or partner present, and 23.0% were households with a female householder and no spouse or partner present. About 15.3% of all households were made up of individuals and 5.9% had someone living alone who was 65 years of age or older.

There were 4,745 housing units, of which 6.5% were vacant. The homeowner vacancy rate was 1.2% and the rental vacancy rate was 5.9%.

=== 2000 census ===
As of the 2000 census, there were 13,979 people, 4,007 households, and 3,193 families residing in the CDP. The population density was 1,727.0 inhabitants per square mile (666.8/km^{2}). There were 4,403 housing units at an average density of 543.9 per square mile (210.0/km^{2}).

Among the 4,007 households in 2000, 5.1% had children under the age of 18 living with them, 60.9% were married couples living together, 12.0% had a female householder with no husband present, and 20.3% were non-families. 16.5% of all households were made up of individuals, and 5.7% had someone living alone who was 65 years of age or older. The average household size was 3.44 and the average family size was 3.86. In the CDP, the population was spread out, with 33.1% under the age of 18, 11.4% from 18 to 24, 30.5% from 25 to 44, 17.6% from 45 to 64, and 7.3% who were 65 years of age or older. The median age was 28 years. For every 100 females, there were 107.7 males. For every 100 females age 18 and over, there were 106.4 males.

=== Income and poverty ===
In 2000, the median income for a household in the CDP was $32,437, and the median income for a family was $35,518. Males had a median income of $28,779 versus $19,936 for females. The per capita income of the CDP was $11,701. About 17.0% of families and 18.6% of the population were below the poverty line, including 24.3% of those under age 18 and 19.3% of those age 65 or over. In 2020 ACS estimates, the median household income was $35,087 and the mean income was $49,382.

== Parks and recreation ==
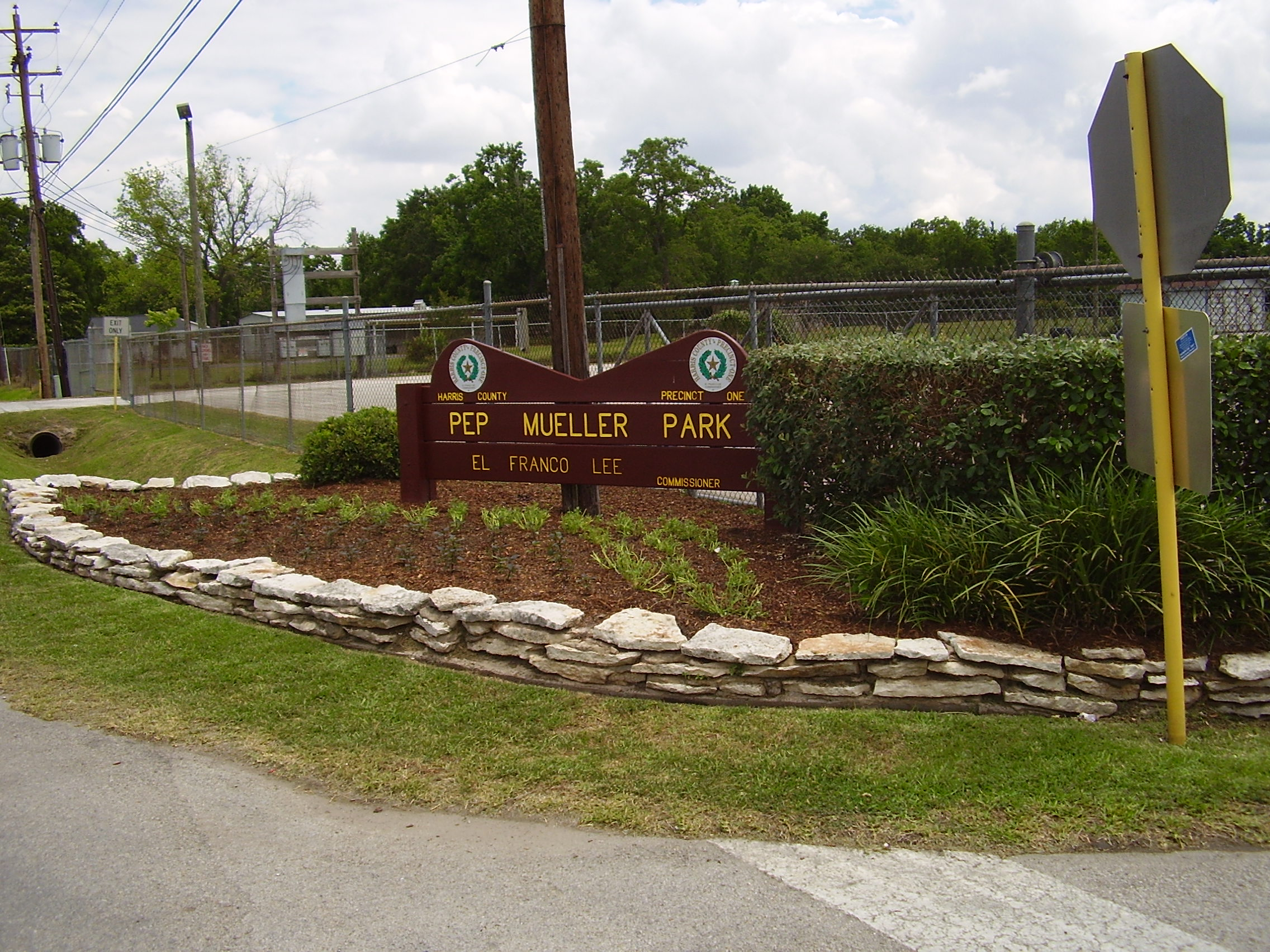
Pep Mueller Park

Harris County Precinct 1 operates Pep Mueller Park, located at 14750 Henry Road in Aldine. It was given its current name in 1981 to honor M. A. "Pep" Mueller, the superintendent of Precinct 4's Spring Camp, Road, and Bridge Maintenance Facility. The park has a playground, a community building, a basketball pavilion, a toilet and concession facility, four ball fields, and four press boxes.

== Government and infrastructure ==
=== Local government ===
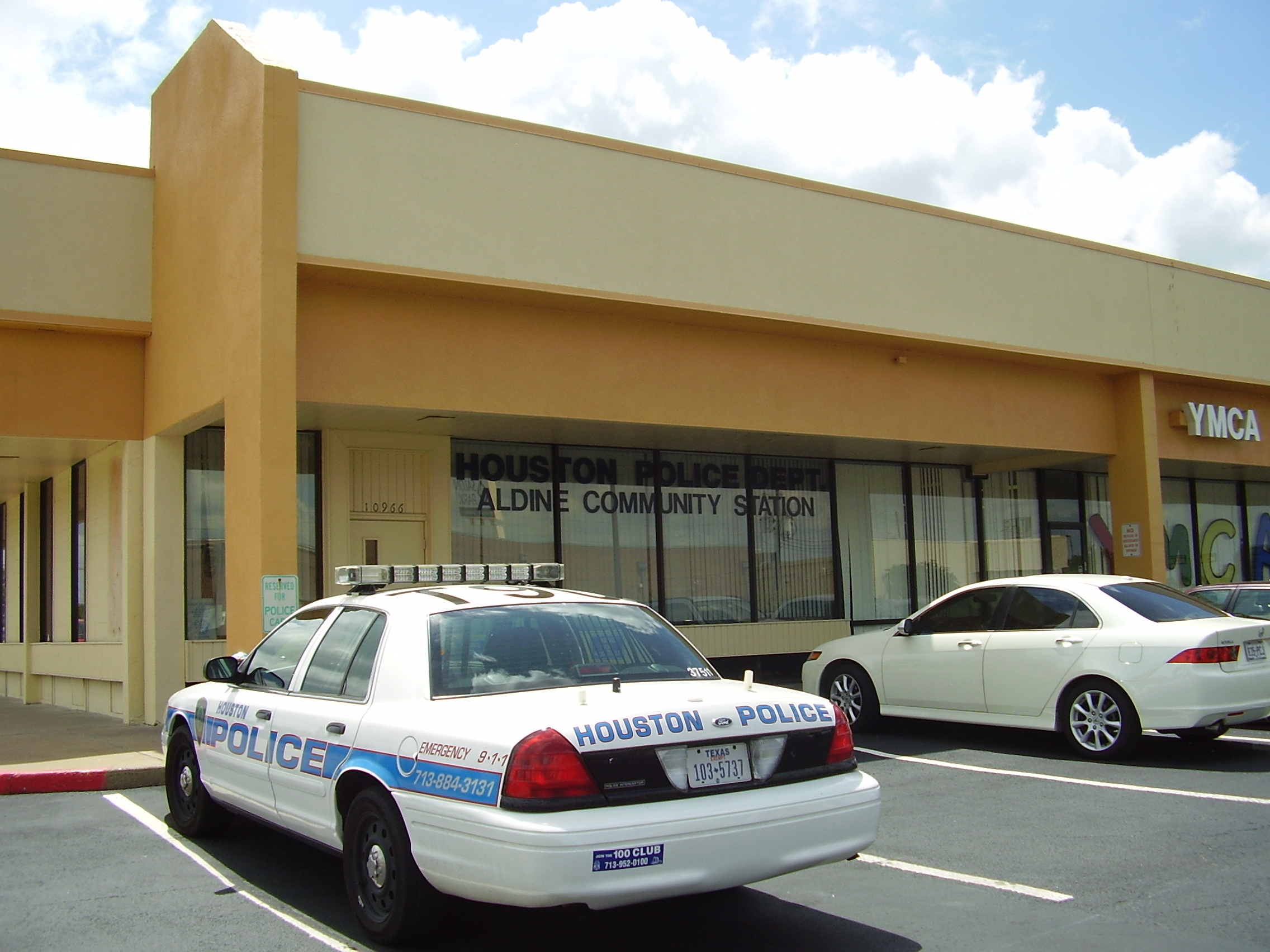
The former Aldine police storefront in Houston

Areas within the Aldine CDP are served by Aldine Fire & Rescue. The Westfield Volunteer Fire Department serves some unincorporated areas outside of the Aldine CDP and in the Aldine area. Emergency medical services are provided by Harris County Emergency Corps.

In 1989, during a city council race, many in the Houston portion of the Aldine area voted for Jim Westmoreland for an at-large position. Westmoreland drew controversy after reports of a joke that was characterized as "racist" spread. His opponent Beverly Clark, an African-American teacher, defeated him in that race.

The portion of the Aldine area in the city of Houston is served by the Houston Police Department. Areas in the Houston city limits around the CDP are served by either the North Patrol Division, the North Belt Patrol Division, or the Northeast Patrol Division. In the North Division the city formerly operated the Aldine Storefront at 10966 North Freeway (Interstate 45).

=== County, state, and federal representation ===
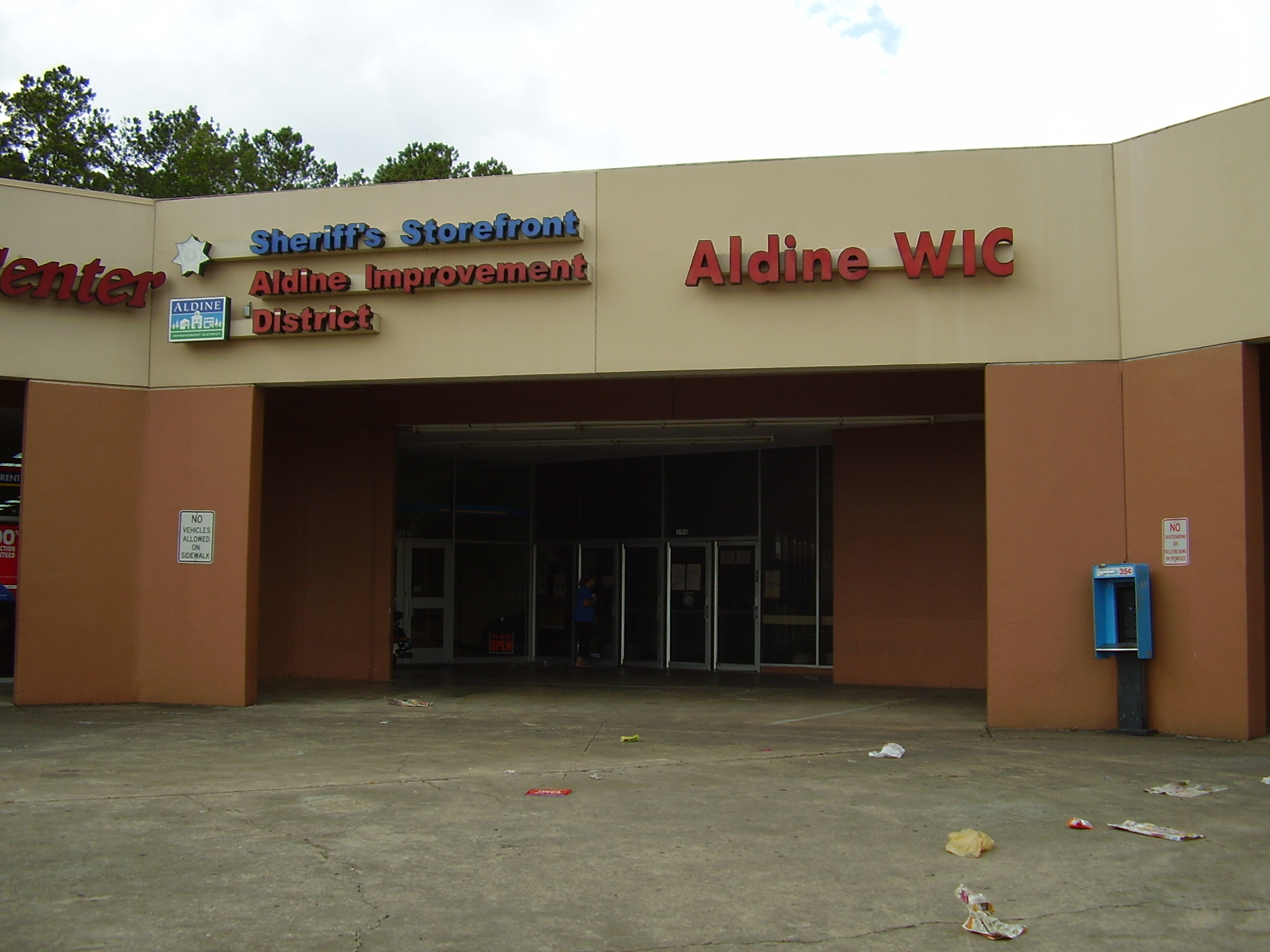
Harris County Sheriff's Office storefront and Aldine Improvement District office

Harris Health System (formerly Harris County Hospital District) operates the Aldine Health Center at 4755 Aldine Mail Route in unincorporated Harris County.

The Aldine CDP is served by Harris County Sheriff's Office District II Patrol, headquartered from the Humble Substation at 7900 Will Clayton Parkway in Humble. The Aldine Community Storefront is located at 5202 Aldine Mail Route.

== Education ==
=== Primary and secondary schools ===
==== Public schools ====
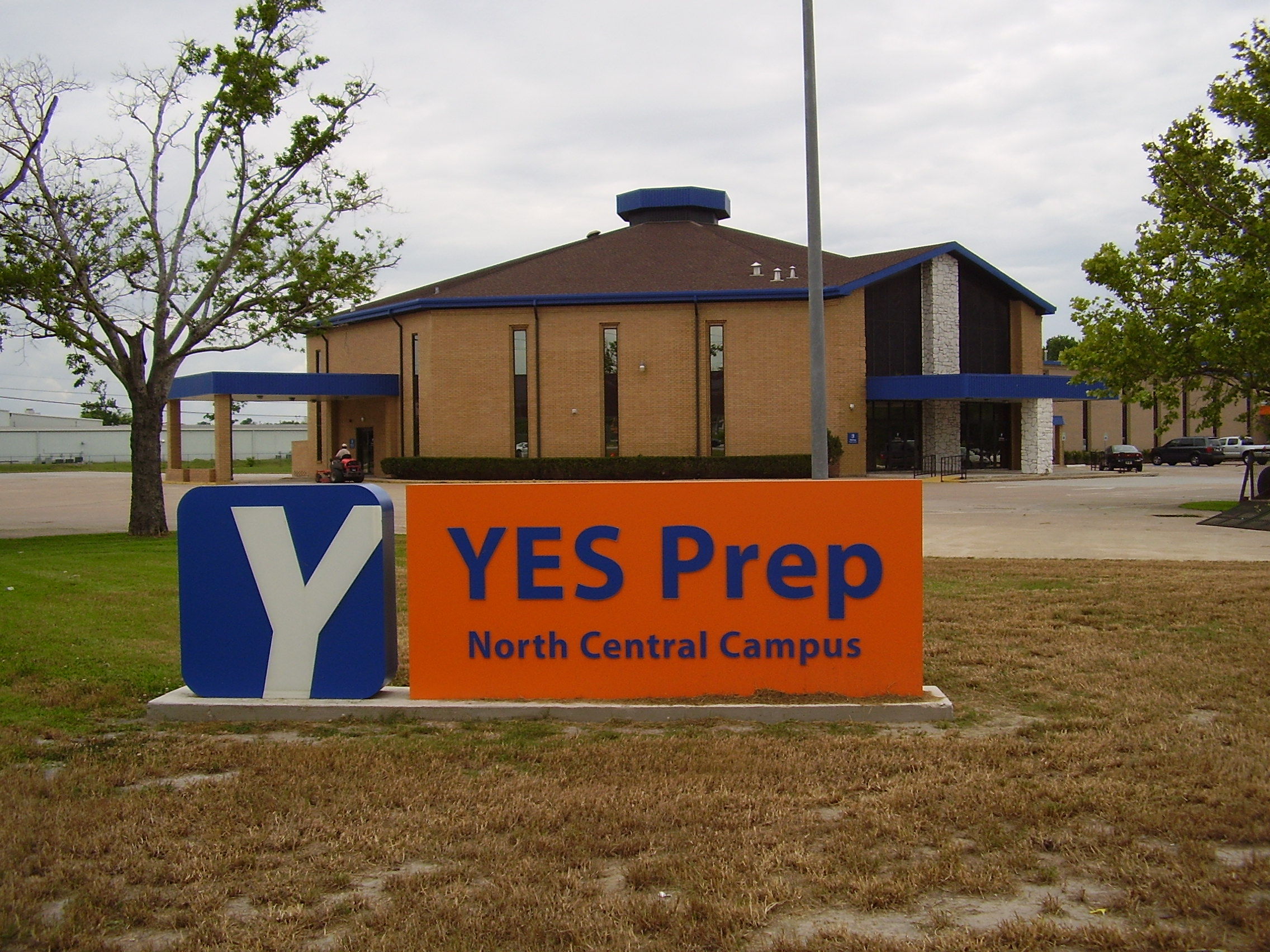
YES Prep North Central

Aldine Independent School District serves the CDP and much of the surrounding community.

PreK schools serving sections of Aldine CDP include deSantiago, Hinojosa (in Aldine CDP), and Lauder.

Elementary schools serving sections of Aldine CDP include Odom (in Aldine CDP), Reed (in Aldine CDP), Raymond (in Aldine CDP), Carroll, Eckert, and Bussey (in Houston). Eckert and Reed were previously grade 5-6 intermediate schools.

Middle schools serving Aldine CDP include Grantham (in Aldine CDP), Stovall (in Houston), and Aldine Middle (not in the CDP).

Aldine High School in Houston serves sections of Aldine CDP west of the Hardy Toll Road; sections east of the Hardy Toll Road are served by MacArthur High School and Nimitz High School, in unincorporated areas not in the CDP.

YES Prep North Central, a charter 6-12 grade public school, is located within unincorporated Harris County in the Aldine CDP.

=== Community colleges ===
Lone Star College System (formerly the North Harris Montgomery Community College District) serves the area. In 1972 residents of Aldine ISD and two other K-12 school districts voted to create the North Harris County College. The community college district began operations in the fall of 1973.

=== Public libraries ===
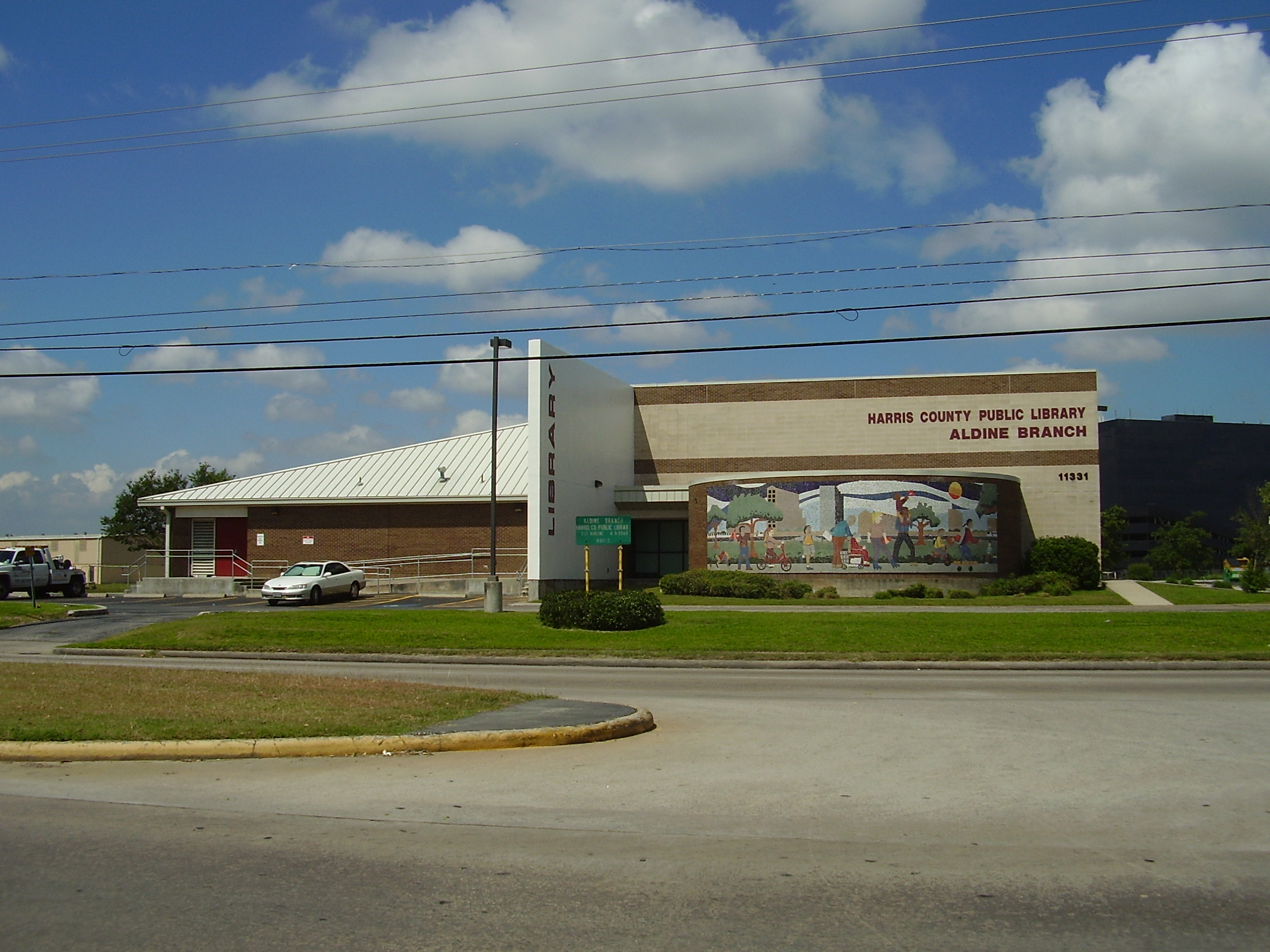
Aldine Branch

The Harris County Public Library Aldine Branch, located at 11331 Airline Drive in Greenspoint and in Houston, serves the community. The 13,268-square-foot (1,232.6 m^{2}) branch opened in 1976. The renovated Aldine Branch reopened on September 6, 2001. The expansion and renovation was originally scheduled to be completed in January 2001. Due to the expansion, the library gained 6,000 square feet (560 m^{2}), which led to increases in meeting spaces and a 100% increase in the number of computers. Students from Aldine High School, Aldine 9th Grade School, Stovall Middle School, and Black Elementary School use the branch.
