= San Diego State University College of Education =

Coordinates: 32°46′31″N 117°4′9″W

- Motto: Learn · Discover · Engage
- Type: Public
- Parent institution: San Diego State University
- Undergraduates: 505 (2013)
- Postgraduates: 606 (2013)
- Doctoral students: 102 (2013)
- Other students: 357 (2013)
- Website: go.sdsu.edu/education/

The San Diego State University College of Education offers teacher education and training programs at San Diego State University (SDSU). It offers undergraduate programs, teaching credentials for degree holders, master's degrees and both the Ed.D and Ph.D doctoral degrees.

The college prepares undergraduate and graduate students for careers as professional educators, including careers as administrators, teachers, professors, school psychologists and counselors, resource and training specialists, and educational support personnel.

== Degrees ==
- Bachelor of Arts (B.A.)
- Master of Arts (M.A.)
- Doctor of Education (Ed.D.)
- Doctor of Philosophy (Ph.D.)

== Departments ==
- Administration, Rehabilitation, and Postsecondary Education (ARPE)
- Child and Family Development (CFD)
- Counseling and School Psychology (CSP)
- Dual Language and English Learner Education (DLE), formerly Policy Studies in Language & Cross-Cultural Education
- Educational Leadership (EDL)
- Special Education (SPED)
- School of Teacher Education (STE)

== Institutes ==
- Interwork Institute
  - The Interwork Institute focuses on promoting the integration of all individuals, including those with disabilities, into all aspects of education, work, family, and community life. The Institute conducts research, training, and education using a variety of strategies including distance learning technologies. Current efforts include promoting universal design in all aspects of the community. Education and research efforts involve organizations and individuals in all states, tribal communities, the Pacific Basin, Asia, Mexico, South America and Europe.
- QUALCOMM Institute for Innovation and Educational Success
  - Established at SDSU in 2004 through a $14.5 million gift from QUALCOMM. Its primary objective is to identify and address major issues critical to the long-term prosperity of the San Diego region. The Institute focuses on four key initiatives, three aimed at developing a more technologically proficient workforce via enhanced mathematics and technical education, and another which creates a Center focused on partnering with urban school districts to improve student performance. The Initiatives include:
    - The ISAM (Improving Student Achievement in Mathematics) project
    - Project Lead The Way (PLTW)
    - The People, Information and Communication Technologies (pICT) collaborative
    - The National Center for Urban School Transformation (NCUST)
- Center for Equity and Biliteracy Education Research (CEBER)
  - The Department of Dual Language and English Learner Education (DLE) in the College of education at San Diego State University has established the Center for Equity and Biliteracy Education Research (CEBER) to examine the social and linguistic conditions that hinder and promote the advancement of democratic schooling and educational social justice in the pursue of the principle of “equal educational benefits for all students.”

== See also ==
- San Diego State University
