= 1990 World Series =

87th edition of Major League Baseball's championship series

Team (Wins)	Managers	Season
Cincinnati Reds (4)	Lou Piniella	91–71, .562, GA: 5
Oakland Athletics (0)	Tony La Russa	103–59, .636, GA: 9
- Dates: October 16–20
- Venue(s): Riverfront Stadium (Cincinnati); Oakland–Alameda County Coliseum (Oakland)
- MVP: José Rijo (Cincinnati)
- Umpires: Frank Pulli (NL), Ted Hendry (AL), Jim Quick (NL), Rocky Roe (AL), Randy Marsh (NL), Larry Barnett (AL: Games 1 and 2), Bruce Froemming (NL: Games 3 and 4)
- Hall of Famers: Reds: Barry Larkin; Tony Pérez (coach); Athletics: Tony La Russa (manager); Harold Baines; Dennis Eckersley; Rickey Henderson

Broadcast
- Television: CBS
- TV announcers: Jack Buck and Tim McCarver
- Radio: CBS; WLW (CIN); KSFO (OAK)
- Radio announcers: Vin Scully and Johnny Bench (CBS); Marty Brennaman and Joe Nuxhall (WLW); Bill King and Lon Simmons (KSFO)
- ALCS: Oakland Athletics over Boston Red Sox (4–0)
- NLCS: Cincinnati Reds over Pittsburgh Pirates (4–2)

The 1990 World Series was the championship series of Major League Baseball's (MLB) 1990 season. The 87th edition of the World Series, it was a best-of-seven playoff played between the defending champions and heavily favored American League (AL) champion Oakland Athletics and the National League (NL) champion Cincinnati Reds. The Reds defeated the Athletics in a four-game sweep. It was the fifth four-game sweep by the NL and second by the Reds after they did it in 1976. It was the second consecutive World Series to end in a sweep, after the Athletics themselves did it to the San Francisco Giants in 1989. It is remembered for Billy Hatcher's seven consecutive hits. The sweep extended the Reds' World Series winning streak to nine games, dating back to 1975. This also was the second World Series meeting between the two clubs (Oakland won four games to three in 1972). To date, this remains both teams' most recent appearance in the World Series, and is Cincinnati's second most recent victory in a playoff series. The Reds win made them the ninth straight unique team to win a championship, the second longest streak in MLB and American sports history after the 1978-87 streak of ten straight years. In fact, between 1978 and 1990, only the Dodgers won more than one championship.

Athletics manager Tony La Russa and Reds manager Lou Piniella were old friends and teammates from their Tampa American Legion Post 248 team.

== Background ==
=== Cincinnati Reds ===
The Cincinnati Reds won the National League West division by five games over the Los Angeles Dodgers. They set an NL record by staying in first place in the division for the entire season or "wire-to-wire", which had been done only one other time, by the 1984 Detroit Tigers. The Reds then defeated the Pittsburgh Pirates, four games to two, in the National League Championship Series.

==== "The Nasty Boys" ====
The strength of the Cincinnati Reds bullpen and timely hitting led them to a quick sweep of the AL champions. The Reds' bullpen had three primary members—Norm Charlton, Randy Myers, and Rob Dibble—collectively they were known as the "Nasty Boys", who wouldn't let the A's score against them in nearly nine innings of work. Media talk of a forthcoming A's dynasty led Reds fans to call their own team the "dyNASTY." The Nasty Boys originally referred to five pitchers, with the other two being Tim Layana and Tim Birtsas (though history relates it to the aforementioned three). On his XM show, Dibble still adds these two pitchers into the "Nasty Boys", stating it was a collective bullpen effort.

=== Oakland Athletics ===
The Oakland Athletics won the American League West division by nine games over the Chicago White Sox. They then defeated the Boston Red Sox, four games to none, in the American League Championship Series.

The Athletics were the defending World Series champions, two-time defending American League champions, and heavy favorites against the Reds. The Athletics became the first franchise to appear in three consecutive World Series since the 1976–1978 New York Yankees. Their lineup included three former AL Rookies-of-the-Year: José Canseco (1986), Mark McGwire (1987), and Walt Weiss (1988), and six players who finished in the top twelve for AL MVP. A's outfielder Willie McGee won a batting title that year, but it wasn't the AL batting title. He batted .335 for the NL's St Louis Cardinals (with enough plate appearances to qualify for the NL batting title) before he was traded in late August to Oakland.

Behind starter Dave Stewart and reliever Dennis Eckersley, the Athletics had won 306 games over the prior three seasons.

== Summary ==
NL Cincinnati Reds (4) vs. AL Oakland Athletics (0)

Game	Date	Score	Location	Time	Attendance
1	October 16	Oakland Athletics – 0, Cincinnati Reds – 7	Riverfront Stadium	2:48	55,830
2	October 17	Oakland Athletics – 4, Cincinnati Reds – 5 (10)	Riverfront Stadium	3:31	55,832
3	October 19	Cincinnati Reds – 8, Oakland Athletics – 3	Oakland–Alameda County Coliseum	3:01	48,269
4	October 20	Cincinnati Reds – 2, Oakland Athletics – 1	Oakland–Alameda County Coliseum	2:48	48,613

== Matchups ==
=== Game 1 ===
Tuesday, October 16, 1990 8:32 pm (EDT) at Riverfront Stadium in Cincinnati, Ohio 62 °F (17 °C), mostly cloudy
Team	1	2	3	4	5	6	7	8	9	R	H	E
Oakland	0	0	0	0	0	0	0	0	0	0	9	1
Cincinnati	2	0	2	0	3	0	0	0	X	7	10	0
WP: José Rijo (1–0) LP: Dave Stewart (0–1); Home runs: OAK: None; CIN: Eric Davis (1)

The schedule called for the seven-game series to be held Tue–Wed, Fri–Sat–Sun, Tue–Wed. Games 5, 6, and 7, however, were not necessary. This was the first World Series to begin play on a Tuesday since 1984, and the last until 2014 (all World Series between 1985 and 2006, with the exception of this one, were scheduled to begin on a Saturday, while those from 2007 through 2013 featured Wednesday starts). The change in this instance was necessitated by an early season lockout which had caused the first week of the season to be postponed. In order to make up the postponed games, the regular season was extended by three days, causing the postseason to begin on a Thursday rather than a Tuesday, as had been the practice for many years.

When Oakland Athletics pitcher Dave Stewart entered to pitch Game 1, he had a six-game postseason winning streak going, which ended after four innings of work.

The Reds got out of the gate quickly with a two-run home run (that nearly hit the CBS television studio where anchor Pat O'Brien was sitting in left-center) from Eric Davis in the bottom of the first inning off A's ace Dave Stewart. Billy Hatcher helped out offensively in a big way by starting his streak of seven straight hits in the series after a walk in the first inning. The Reds added to their lead when Barry Larkin drew a leadoff walk in the third and scored on a double by Hatcher, who moved to third on shortstop Mike Gallego's throw to home, then scored on Paul O'Neill's groundout. In the fifth, after a one-out double by Hatcher and an O'Neill walk off of Todd Burns, Davis's RBI single made it 5–0 Reds and after a groundout moved the runners up, Chris Sabo's two-run single capped the game's scoring at 7–0. José Rijo settled in after the early lead with seven shutout innings. Two "Nasty Boys," Rob Dibble and Randy Myers pitched the eighth and ninth innings and Cincinnati cruised to a surprise victory. The following day's headline in The Cincinnati Post captured the city's surprise with the headline, "Davis Stuns Goliath."

=== Game 2 ===
Wednesday, October 17, 1990 8:29 pm (EDT) at Riverfront Stadium in Cincinnati, Ohio 70 °F (21 °C), overcast
Team	1	2	3	4	5	6	7	8	9	10	R	H	E
Oakland	1	0	3	0	0	0	0	0	0	0	4	10	2
Cincinnati	2	0	0	1	0	0	0	1	0	1	5	14	2
WP: Rob Dibble (1–0) LP: Dennis Eckersley (0–1); Home runs: OAK: José Canseco (1); CIN: None

First Lady Barbara Bush threw out the ceremonial first pitch. Eventual Cy Young Award winner Bob Welch opposed postseason veteran Danny Jackson in Game 2. Rickey Henderson manufactured a run for the A's in the first by getting a hit, stealing second, getting sacrificed to third by Carney Lansford, and scoring on a groundout by José Canseco. The Reds came right back in the bottom of the first. Barry Larkin and Billy Hatcher hit consecutive opposite field doubles and Hatcher would score on Davis's groundout.

In the third the A's got the lead back. José Canseco hit a rocket into the right-center field stands to tie the game (his only hit of the series). A base hit by Mark McGwire and two walks to Dave Henderson and Willie Randolph followed, knocking the ineffective Jackson out of the game. With the bases loaded, Ron Hassey hit a sac fly off new pitcher Scott Scudder to score McGwire and Mike Gallego singled to center off Scudder to score Dave Henderson to give the A's a 4–2 lead.

The A's, however, would not score any more runs thanks to the relief pitching of Scudder, All-Star game starter Jack Armstrong, and the threesome nicknamed the "Nasty Boys": Rob Dibble, Norm Charlton, and Randy Myers.

The Reds got a run closer at 4–3 on pinch hitter Ron Oester's RBI single that drove in Joe Oliver in the fourth; incidentally, this would be the last plate appearance of Oester's career, all 13 seasons of which were spent in Cincinnati. The Reds tied it in the eighth when Hatcher tripled over the crippled Canseco (who was suffering from back spasms throughout the playoffs) and scored on pinch-hitter Glenn Braggs's force play (after O'Neill was walked to set it up). Welch would be charged with all four runs in 7 1/3 innings and Rick Honeycutt was charged with a blown save after allowing Hatcher to score.

During Game 2, Reds pitcher Tom Browning's pregnant wife Debbie went into labor during the game. Debbie left her seat in the fifth inning to drive herself to the hospital, and Browning, thinking he wouldn't be asked to pitch as he was scheduled to start Game 3, followed her soon after. As the game went on, the Reds wanted Browning ready to pitch just in case the game went well into extra innings. Unable to find Browning, and surmising he was at a hospital with his wife, the Reds had their radio broadcaster Marty Brennaman put out an All Points Bulletin on Browning. This bulletin was picked up by Tim McCarver on CBS television, who passed it along in the tenth inning. Browning heard McCarver's message on a TV at the hospital and debated leaving while the tenth inning started.

In the tenth, the Reds broke through to win the game off A's closer Dennis Eckersley. Utilityman Billy Bates chopped an infield single off home plate to start the inning. Chris Sabo singled to left to put runners on first and second. Then Oliver hit a bouncer that hopped over third base and down the line in left to drive in Bates with a walk-off hit. According to Browning, his son, Tucker, was born right after the game ended.

This was the last of five World Series to be played at Riverfront Stadium (1970, 1972, 1975, 1976, and 1990), which was closed and demolished in 2002. As of 2025, Great American Ball Park, the Reds current home field, has yet to host a World Series.

=== Game 3 ===
Friday, October 19, 1990 5:32 pm (PDT) at Oakland–Alameda County Coliseum in Oakland, California 63 °F (17 °C), clear
Team	1	2	3	4	5	6	7	8	9	R	H	E
Cincinnati	0	1	7	0	0	0	0	0	0	8	14	1
Oakland	0	2	1	0	0	0	0	0	0	3	7	1
WP: Tom Browning (1–0) LP: Mike Moore (0–1); Home runs: CIN: Chris Sabo 2 (2); OAK: Harold Baines (1), Rickey Henderson (1)

In Game 3 the Reds took a 3–0 series lead on the defending champs. Tom Browning (two days after becoming a father) started for the Reds while Mike Moore, who had two wins in the 1989 World Series (alongside Dave Stewart), got the assignment for Oakland despite struggling throughout the regular season. In the second inning, Chris Sabo put the Reds up 1–0 with a solo homer. The lead was short lived as DH Harold Baines hit a soaring two-run homer after a Dave Henderson double to give the A's a 2–1 lead in the bottom of the second.

In the third, the Reds' seven-run inning began with Billy Hatcher's eighth hit in nine at-bats (he had rapped into a double-play in the first inning ending his streak of seven straight hits). Paul O'Neill then singled off the glove of first baseman Mark McGwire to put runners on first and second. Eric Davis drilled a sharp single to center scoring Hatcher to tie the game and advancing O'Neill to third. Following an RBI groundout by DH Hal Morris that put the Reds ahead, the Reds went up 5–2 when Sabo hit his second homer of the game into the left field stands. Todd Benzinger, the Reds' first baseman then singled and Joe Oliver hit an RBI double. Mariano Duncan drove Oliver home with a single, stole second, and scored himself when Barry Larkin hit a gapper. The A's now trailed the Reds 8–2. Rickey Henderson's third inning home run made it 8–3, but Tom Browning pitched effectively for six innings to earn the victory. Dibble and Myers provided three scoreless innings in relief to put the Reds one win away from the title.

=== Game 4 ===
Saturday, October 20, 1990 5:29 pm (PDT) at Oakland–Alameda County Coliseum in Oakland, California 65 °F (18 °C), mostly clear
Team	1	2	3	4	5	6	7	8	9	R	H	E
Cincinnati	0	0	0	0	0	0	0	2	0	2	7	1
Oakland	1	0	0	0	0	0	0	0	0	1	2	1
WP: José Rijo (2–0) LP: Dave Stewart (0–2) Sv: Randy Myers (1)

The first pitch was thrown out by former Oakland A's outfielder Joe Rudi. who was a member of the 3 straight championshipships won in 1972, 1973 and 1974. Game 4 was a pitchers' duel between Dave Stewart and José Rijo (the Game 1 starters) that eventually culminated in the Reds sweeping the series. Despite a 3–0 series lead, the Reds' advantage became tenuous early on when two cornerstones of their lineup—Davis and Hatcher—had to be removed from the game with injuries. Hatcher was hit on the hand by a pitch in the first inning. He was taken to the hospital for X-rays but was found to have only a severe bruise and would likely have been day-to-day had the series continued. Davis's injury was more serious and would have been series-ending. Chasing a fly ball, he fell hard on his elbow jammed into his side, and sustained both a rib cage injury and a kidney laceration. He was also taken to the hospital and, unlike Hatcher, never returned to the park that night. (He remained hospitalized in Oakland for another week, leading to a public relations debacle when Reds owner Marge Schott made him charter a medically equipped flight back to Cincinnati at his own expense, though Schott later reimbursed him after criticisms from the media.) The A's got on the board in the first when Willie McGee doubled and Carney Lansford singled him in. The game remained 1–0 until the eighth when the Reds finally got to Stewart. Barry Larkin singled up the middle, and Herm Winningham followed with a bunt that he beat out for a base hit. Paul O'Neill's subsequent bunt attempt was fielded by Stewart, but Stewart's throw to first took Willie Randolph off the bag, allowing O'Neill to reach first and load the bases. Glenn Braggs then grounded into a force play with O'Neill out at second to score the first run, and Hal Morris's sacrifice fly gave the Reds a 2–1 edge, which was preserved by both Rijo, who at one point retired 20 straight batters, and Randy Myers who got the final two outs. The A's became the first team ever to be swept in a World Series after sweeping the League Championship Series. This was later duplicated by the 2007 Colorado Rockies and the 2012 Detroit Tigers. Additionally, this was the first time since 1938-1939 (when the New York Yankees won both times; the Yankees also did it in 1927 and 1928) that two consecutive World Series ended in a four-game sweep, which would be repeated in 1998-1999 (both won by the Yankees), and again in 2004-2005 (won by the Boston Red Sox and Chicago White Sox, respectively).

Cincinnati Reds' pitcher José Rijo became the second Dominican born player to earn World Series MVP honors. Pedro Guerrero of the Los Angeles Dodgers in 1981, along with his co-MVP teammates Ron Cey and Steve Yeager was the first Dominican born to earn World Series MVP. Fourteen years after Rijo's award, (2004), Manny Ramírez of the Boston Red Sox became the third. Other Series heroes included Reds third baseman Chris Sabo who went 9 of 16 (.562) with 2 home runs; and Reds outfielder Billy Hatcher, who set a World Series record with seven consecutive hits. In addition, Hatcher's .750 batting average (9 for 12) broke a four-game-Series mark set by Babe Ruth (.625 in 1928). Both Sabo and Hatcher were strong candidates to be named the Most Valuable Player. Hatcher, however, got the consolation prize of winning the Babe Ruth Award for his World Series performance. Shortly after the series, Athletics owner Walter Haas issued a public apology to the City of Oakland for his team's performance, while at the same time assuring the fans that plans to put the team together for 1991 would begin immediately.

== Composite box ==
1990 World Series (4–0): Cincinnati Reds (N.L.) over Oakland Athletics (A.L.)

Team	1	2	3	4	5	6	7	8	9	10	R	H	E
Cincinnati Reds	4	1	9	1	3	0	0	3	0	1	22	45	4
Oakland Athletics	2	2	4	0	0	0	0	0	0	0	8	28	5
Total attendance: 208,544 Average attendance: 52,136; Winning player's share: $112,534 Losing player's share: $86,961

== Radio and television coverage ==
CBS Sports covered the World Series as part of the new contract it had signed with Major League Baseball. The broadcast was led by Jack Buck, who had called the previous six World Series for CBS Radio. Serving as analyst was Tim McCarver, who had joined the CBS broadcast team after working for ABC Sports since 1983. Jim Kaat and Lesley Visser served as field reporters, while Pat O'Brien hosted the pregame and postgame shows. The World Series was the third major sporting event to be broadcast by CBS in 1990; the network aired Super Bowl XXIV in January 1990 and carried its last NBA Finals in the spring.

CBS Radio continued to serve as the nationwide radio home of the World Series for a fifteenth consecutive year. For the first time since 1982, Vin Scully served as the lead broadcaster; he had left CBS after losing out on a chance to be its lead NFL voice and had spent the previous seven years as NBC Sports' lead baseball voice. Johnny Bench returned for a second consecutive series as analyst, with John Rooney hosting the pregame and postgame shows for a third consecutive year.

== Aftermath ==
The 1990 World Series would be the Reds' fifth championship but would also be remembered as one of the biggest upsets in baseball history. The twelve game differential between the teams' regular season records made this one of only two times in World Series history that a team swept an opponent whose regular season record bested theirs by ten games or more, the other being the 1954 New York Giants, who swept the 14-games-better Cleveland Indians. The Reds 22–8 scoring margin was the same scoring margin from their last World Series win in 1976 over the Yankees which also was a sweep. Schott was reportedly so upset that the Reds won in a sweep, believing that owners made the most money if World Series' went beyond four games, that she refused to pay for food and drink at a post-season Reds' celebration party.

The Oakland Athletics were initially favored to win a fourth consecutive American League pennant in 1991, but their pitching that had led the American League by a wide margin in 1990, failed the team in 1991. Staff ace Dave Stewart struggled; his 1991 ERA (5.18) was more than twice his 1990 ERA (2.56). 1990 Cy Young Award winner Bob Welch fared almost as poorly; his earned run average swelled from 2.95 (1990) to 4.58 (1991). In 1990, he had won a league-high 27 games; in 1991, he won a mere 12. The A's team ERA of 4.57 was the 2nd worst in the American League. At the plate, Mark McGwire hit just .201, suffering through a self-described “worst year of my life”, as he told Sports Illustrated in 1992. On a positive note, Rickey Henderson stole his 938th career base on May 1; in doing so, he succeeded Lou Brock as MLB's career stolen base leader.

Oakland would return to contention in 1992 with a record of 96–66. The 1991 season still, however, marked the end of the Athletics as a dynastic power. The 1992 team failed to dominate the league in the manner that the 1988–90 teams had; following that team's six-game ALCS defeat to the eventual world champion Toronto Blue Jays, Oakland wouldn't reach the postseason until 2000. This World Series would also be the last hurrah of the Bash Brothers duo of Canseco and McGwire. After playing together for four full seasons, the two would continue to play together for the entire 1991 season and the first half of the following year before Canseco was traded to the Texas Rangers midway through the 1992 season.

Cincinnati was unable to replicate its surprising 1990 championship season in 1991, setting a record at the time for worst winning percentage from a defending champion with just a 74–88 record (.457 win percentage). The 1992 Reds rebounded with 90 wins – just one fewer than their 1990 campaign – but finished eight games behind the Braves. After a poor 1993, Cincinnati led the new NL Central division in 1994 before the season was cancelled due to the Major League Baseball strike, and in 1995 won the division and the National League Division Series, which as of 2025 is the Reds' most recent postseason series victory. The Reds were swept in the 1995 NLCS by the eventual champion Braves and were eliminated in the first round in their five subsequent playoff appearances in 2010, 2012, 2013 (a single-game Wild Card loss), 2020 and 2025.

As it turned out, the Nasty Boys bullpen trio of Norm Charlton, Rob Dibble and Randy Myers would only play together for two seasons. Myers left after the 1991 season, and Charlton and Dibble, both having played for the team since 1988, left after the 1992 and 1993 seasons respectively. Only three players on the championship roster were present for the Reds' next postseason appearance in 1995: Barry Larkin, who played his entire 19-year career with the Reds; Mariano Duncan, who left after the 1991 season and rejoined the Reds mid-season in August 1995; and World Series MVP José Rijo, who sustained an elbow injury in July 1995 that forced him out of baseball until 2001.

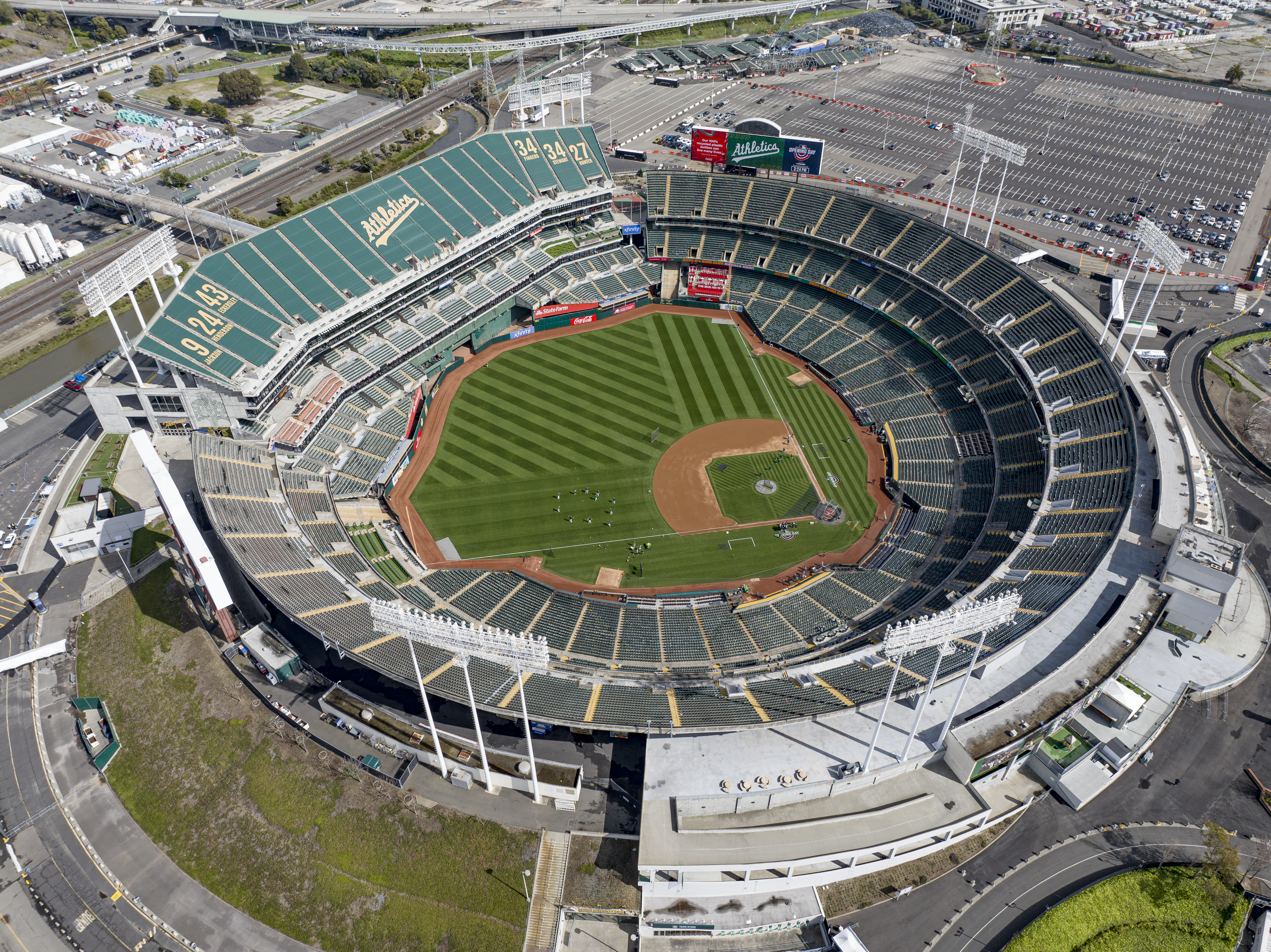
With the Athletics move to Vegas planned in 2028, this was the last World Series played at Oakland Coliseum.

To date, this is the last time either team has appeared in the World Series. As a result, this would prove to be the Athletics' final World Series appearance while the team was based in Oakland, as they temporarily moved to West Sacramento in 2025 while a new ballpark in Las Vegas is constructed with the expectation it will open in time for the 2028 season. As such, this was the last World Series played at Oakland Coliseum.

This was also the final World Series to feature a team that wore pullover jerseys (Cincinnati).

This was the last championship of the four major North American sports leagues won by a team from Ohio until the Cleveland Cavaliers made and won the 2016 NBA Finals. This is also the most recent sports championship for the city of Cincinnati; the city's other professional team, the Cincinnati Bengals of the NFL, have only once made it to the championship round since 1990, losing to the Rams in Super Bowl LVI in 2022.

== See also ==
- 1990 Japan Series
- List of World Series sweeps
