= Westfield, Texas =

Unincorporated community in Texas, US

Coordinates: 30°01′12″N 95°24′08″W

Westfield is an unincorporated community in Harris County, Texas, United States, located along Interstate 45 and the Union Pacific Railroad nineteen miles (31 km) north of Downtown Houston.

== History ==
In 1846 Herman Tautenhahn, a German immigrant, built a general store near Cypress Station. By 1876, Westfield was established; the community was named after Gadi F. West, a man who owned a field along the International–Great Northern Railroad. In 1873, a post office opened. Tautenhahn moved his store closer to the rail line. Westfield's economy consisted of loading goods such as cattle, cotton, hides, and lumber from local warehouses and cattle pens onto freight cars. The community shipped a tonnage of goods equalling that shipped by nearby Spring. By 1890 Westfield had 200 people, of whom most were Anglo-American and German-American. The community included several sorghum manufacturers, three churches, three combination gristmill and cotton gins, one steam sawmill, and one school. Some residents manufactured barrels, farm implements, and furniture. In 1905, Westfield became an overflow point for employees from the nearby Humble oil field. Between 1925 and 1930, the population increased from 50 to 450. During the Great Depression, the population decreased to 50. During World War II 200 residents and 10 businesses were in the community. The population decreased to 125 after the end of the war. By the 1950s, Farm to Market Road 1960 was constructed. In 1962 the store established by Tautenhahn, renamed Big T Shopping Center, moved to the intersection of F.M. 1960 and Interstate 45. The population stayed at the same level from the post-war years until the mid-1960s, when it increased to 275. From 1966 to 1990 the population remained at 275 and the area had a maximum of 32 businesses. The area post office closed in 1972. The state of Texas did not find population figures for the year 2000.

== Government and infrastructure ==
Westfield is within Harris County Precinct 4. Areas west of Interstate 45 are served by Harris County Sheriff's Office District I Patrol, headquartered from the Cypresswood Substation at 6831 Cypresswood Drive. Areas east of Interstate 45 are served by Harris County Sheriff's Office District II Patrol, headquartered from the Humble Substation at 7900 Will Clayton Parkway in Humble.

The Ponderosa Volunteer Fire Department serves areas considered to be in Westfield. One of its three stations, Station 61 at 17061 Rolling Creek Drive, serves as the VFD headquarters and serves the Westfield community. Efforts to form the Ponderosa Fire Department began in 1972. The department opened in 1976.

Westfield is located in District 150 of the Texas House of Representatives. As of 2008 Debbie Riddle represents the district. Westfield is within District 7 of the Texas Senate; as of 2008 Ted Poe represents the district.

Westfield is in Texas's 18th congressional district; as of 2026 Christian Menefee is the representative. Westfield's designated United States Postal Service post office is the Westfield Post Office at 17119 Red Oak Drive.

== Education ==
Areas considered to be in Westfield are served by the Spring Independent School District. Dekaney High School serves the areas considered to be "Westfield", "Greenspoint", and unincorporated Harris County.

Westfield had received its first school by 1890. In 1905 its school for White children had 137 students and one teacher, while its school for Black children had 33 and one teacher.

=== Community colleges ===
Lone Star College System serves the area.

=== Public libraries ===
The closest public library to the area is the Baldwin Boettcher Library of Harris County Public Library at Mercer Park. The 10,137-square-foot (941.8 m^{2}) branch opened in 1986.
