= 1986 Montreal Expos season =

1986 Montreal Expos
- League: National League
- Division: East
- Ballpark: Olympic Stadium
- City: Montreal
- Record: 78–83
- Divisional place: 4th
- Owners: Charles Bronfman
- General managers: Murray Cook
- Managers: Buck Rodgers
- Television: CBC Television (Dave Van Horne, Duke Snider); The Sports Network (Ken Singleton, Tommy Hutton); Télévision de Radio-Canada (Claude Raymond, Raymond Lebrun)
- Radio: CFCF (English) (Dave Van Horne, Duke Snider, Tommy Hutton, Ron Reusch); CKAC (French) (Jacques Doucet, Rodger Brulotte)

The 1986 Montreal Expos season was the 18th season in franchise history, finishing in fourth in the National League East with a 78–83 record and 29½ games behind the eventual World Series champion New York Mets.

== Offseason ==
- October 24, 1985: Bill Laskey was traded by the Expos to the San Francisco Giants for George Riley and Alonzo Powell.
- November 7, 1985: Mel Rojas was signed by the Expos as an amateur free agent.
- November 8, 1985: Razor Shines was released by the Expos.
- December 11, 1985: Roy Johnson was drafted from the Expos by the Chicago White Sox in the 1985 minor league draft.
- December 16, 1985: Steve Baker was traded by the Expos to the Baltimore Orioles for Nelson Norman.
- December 19, 1985: Bill Gullickson and Sal Butera were traded by the Expos to the Cincinnati Reds for Jay Tibbs, Andy McGaffigan, John Stuper, and Dann Bilardello.
- December 27, 1985: Curt Brown was signed as a free agent by the Expos.
- January 13, 1986: Mike Fuentes was traded by the Expos to the Oakland Athletics for Tom Romano.
- February 25, 1986: Bob Owchinko was signed as a free agent with the Montreal Expos.
- March 26, 1986: Jack O'Connor was released by the Expos.
- March 31, 1986: Norm Charlton and a player to be named later were traded by the Expos to the Cincinnati Reds for Wayne Krenchicki. The Expos completed the deal by sending Tim Barker (minors) to the Reds on April 2.
- March 31, 1986: Fred Manrique was traded by the Expos to the St. Louis Cardinals for Tom Nieto.

== Spring training ==
The Expos held spring training at West Palm Beach Municipal Stadium in West Palm Beach, Florida – a facility they shared with the Atlanta Braves. It was their 10th season at the stadium; they had conducted spring training there from 1969 to 1972 and since 1981.

== Regular season ==
- July 6, 1986: In an 11–8 loss to the Expos, Bob Horner of the Atlanta Braves hit four home runs in one game. Horner became the second player in the 20th century (Gil Hodges was the first in 1950) to hit four home runs in one game in his home park. He became the first player since Ed Delahanty to hit four home runs in a losing game.

=== Season standings ===
NL East
Team	W	L	Pct.	GB	Home	Road
New York Mets	108	54	.667	—	55‍–‍26	53‍–‍28
Philadelphia Phillies	86	75	.534	21½	49‍–‍31	37‍–‍44
St. Louis Cardinals	79	82	.491	28½	42‍–‍39	37‍–‍43
Montreal Expos	78	83	.484	29½	36‍–‍44	42‍–‍39
Chicago Cubs	70	90	.438	37	42‍–‍38	28‍–‍52
Pittsburgh Pirates	64	98	.395	44	31‍–‍50	33‍–‍48

=== Record vs. opponents ===
1986 National League record Sources:
Team	ATL	CHC	CIN	HOU	LAD	MON	NYM	PHI	PIT	SD	SF	STL
Atlanta	—	9–3	6–12	5–13	10–8	4–7	4–8	4–8	5–7	12–6	7–11	6–6
Chicago	3–9	—	5–7	4–8	6–6	8–10	6–12	9–8	7–11	6–6	6–6	10–7
Cincinnati	12–6	7–5	—	4–14	10–8	7–5	4–8	7–5	10–2	9–9	9–9	7–5
Houston	13–5	8–4	14–4	—	10–8	8–4	5–7	6–6	6–6	10–8	9–9	7–5
Los Angeles	8–10	6–6	8–10	8–10	—	5–7	3–9	5–7	8–4	6–12	8–10	8–4
Montreal	7–4	10–8	5–7	4–8	5–7	—	8–10	8–10	11–7	4–8	5–7	9–9
New York	8–4	12–6	8–4	7–5	9–3	10–8	—	8–10	17–1	10–2	7–5	12–6
Philadelphia	8-4	8–9	5–7	6–6	7–5	10–8	10–8	—	11–7	6–6	9–3	6–12
Pittsburgh	7–5	11–7	2–10	6–6	4–8	7–11	1–17	7–11	—	8–4	4–8	7–11
San Diego	6–12	6–6	9–9	8–10	12–6	8–4	2–10	6–6	4–8	—	8–10	5–7
San Francisco	11–7	6–6	9–9	9–9	10–8	7–5	5–7	3–9	8–4	10–8	—	5–7
St. Louis	6–6	7–10	5–7	5–7	4–8	9–9	6–12	12–6	11–7	7–5	7–5	—

=== Opening Day starters ===
- Hubie Brooks
- Andre Dawson
- Vance Law
- Tom Nieto
- Tim Raines
- Jason Thompson
- Jay Tibbs
- Tim Wallach
- Mitch Webster

=== Notable transactions ===
- April 1, 1986: Terry Francona was released by the Expos.
- April 5, 1986: Doug Frobel was traded by the Montreal Expos to the New York Mets for Joe Graves (minors) and Rodger Cole (minors).
- June 2, 1986: 1986 Major League Baseball draft
  - Kent Bottenfield was drafted by the Montreal Expos in the 4th round. Player signed June 5, 1986.
  - Mike Blowers was drafted by the Expos in the 10th round. Player signed June 13, 1986.
- June 10, 1986: Johnnie LeMaster was signed as a free agent with the Montreal Expos.
- June 16, 1986: The Expos traded a player to be named later to the Baltimore Orioles for Dennis Martínez and a player to be named later. The Orioles completed their part of the deal by sending John Stefero to the Expos on December 8. The Expos completed the deal by sending Rene Gonzales to the Orioles on December 16.
- July 9, 1986: Johnnie LeMaster was released by the Montreal Expos.
- July 24, 1986: Dan Schatzeder and Skeeter Barnes were traded by the Expos to the Philadelphia Phillies for Tom Foley and Lary Sorensen.
- July 25, 1986: Razor Shines was signed as a free agent by the Expos.

=== Roster ===
1986 Montreal Expos
Roster
Pitchers: 52 Curt Brown; 44 Tim Burke; 38 Joe Hesketh; 32 Dennis Martínez; 22 Bob McClure; 27 Andy McGaffigan; 43 Bob Owchinko; 49 Jeff Parrett; 41 Jeff Reardon; 46 George Riley; 42 Bert Roberge; 43 Dan Schatzeder; 48 Bob Sebra; 28 Bryn Smith; 51 Randy St. Claire; 39 Jay Tibbs; 24 Dave Tomlin; 50 Sergio Valdez; 33 Floyd Youmans	Catchers: 11 Dann Bilardello; 20 Mike Fitzgerald; 47 Randy Hunt; 34 Tom Nieto; 55 Wilfredo Tejada; Infielders: 7 Hubie Brooks; 9 Casey Candaele; 16 Tom Foley; 12 Andrés Galarraga; 19 Rene Gonzales; 6 Wallace Johnson; 15 Wayne Krenchicki; 2 Vance Law; 14 Bill Moore; 4 Al Newman; 17 Luis Rivera; 24 Scott Thompson; 29 Tim Wallach	Outfielders: 10 Andre Dawson; 30 Tim Raines; 23 Mitch Webster; 3 Herm Winningham; 5 Jim Wohlford; 25 George Wright	Manager: 37 Buck Rodgers; Coaches: 36 Larry Bearnarth (Pitching); 26 Ron Hansen (First base); 18 Joe Kerrigan (Bullpen); 35 Rick Renick (Third base); 1 Bobby Winkles (Hitting)

== Player stats ==
= Indicates team leader

=== Batting ===
==== Starters by position ====
Note: Pos = Position; G = Games played; AB = At bats; H = Hits; Avg. = Batting average; HR = Home runs; RBI = Runs batted in

Pos	Player	G	AB	H	Avg.	HR	RBI
C	Mike Fitzgerald	73	209	59	.282	6	37
1B	Andrés Galarraga	105	321	87	.271	10	42
2B	Vance Law	112	360	81	.225	5	44
3B	Tim Wallach	134	480	112	.233	18	71
SS	Hubie Brooks	80	306	104	.340	14	58
LF	Tim Raines	151	580	194	.334	9	62
CF	Mitch Webster	151	576	167	.290	8	49
RF	Andre Dawson	130	496	141	.284	20	78

==== Other batters ====
Note: G = Games played; AB = At bats; H = Hits; Avg. = Batting average; HR = Home runs; RBI = Runs batted in

Player	G	AB	H	Avg.	HR	RBI
Wayne Krenchicki	101	221	53	.240	2	23
Tom Foley	64	202	52	.257	1	18
Dann Bilardello	79	191	37	.194	4	17
Al Newman	95	185	37	.200	1	8
Herm Winningham	90	185	40	.216	4	11
Luis Rivera	55	166	34	.205	0	13
Wallace Johnson	61	127	36	.283	1	10
George Wright	56	117	22	.188	0	5
Casey Candaele	30	104	24	.231	0	6
Jim Wohlford	70	94	25	.266	1	11
Tom Nieto	30	65	13	.200	1	7
Jason Thompson	30	51	10	.196	0	4
Randy Hunt	21	48	10	.208	2	5
Rene Gonzales	11	26	3	.115	0	0
Wilfredo Tejada	10	25	6	.240	0	2
Bill Moore	6	12	2	.167	0	0

=== Pitching ===
==== Starting pitchers ====
Note: G = Games pitched; IP = Innings pitched; W = Wins; L = Losses; ERA = Earned run average; SO = Strikeouts

Player	G	IP	W	L	ERA	SO
Floyd Youmans	33	219.0	13	12	3.53	202
Jay Tibbs	35	190.1	7	9	3.97	117
Bryn Smith	30	187.1	10	8	3.94	105
Dennis Martínez	19	98.0	3	6	4.59	63
Bob Sebra	17	91.1	5	5	3.55	66
Joe Hesketh	15	82.2	6	5	5.01	67
Sergio Valdez	5	25.0	0	4	6.84	20
Bob Owchinko	3	15.0	1	0	3.60	6

==== Other pitchers ====
Note: G = Games pitched; IP = Innings pitched; W = Wins; L = Losses; ERA = Earned run average; SO = Strikeouts

Player	G	IP	W	L	ERA	SO
Andy McGaffigan	48	142.2	10	5	2.65	104

==== Relief pitchers ====
Note: G = Games pitched; W = Wins; L = Losses; SV = Saves; ERA = Earned run average; SO = Strikeouts

Player	G	W	L	SV	ERA	SO
Jeff Reardon	62	7	9	35	3.94	67
Tim Burke	68	9	7	4	2.93	82
Bob McClure	52	2	5	6	3.02	42
Dan Schatzeder	30	3	2	1	3.20	33
Bert Roberge	21	0	4	1	6.28	20
Jeff Parrett	12	0	1	0	4.87	21
Randy St.Claire	11	2	0	1	2.37	21
George Riley	10	0	0	0	4.15	5
Dave Tomlin	7	0	0	0	5.23	6
Curt Brown	6	0	1	0	3.00	4
Vern Law	3	0	0	0	2.25	0

== Awards and honors ==
1986 Major League Baseball All-Star Game

== Farm system ==
Level	Team	League	Manager
AAA	Indianapolis Indians	American Association	Joe Sparks
AA	Jacksonville Expos	Southern League	Tommy Thompson
A	West Palm Beach Expos	Florida State League	Felipe Alou
A	Burlington Expos	Midwest League	J. R. Miner
A-Short Season	Jamestown Expos	New York–Penn League	Gene Glynn
Rookie	GCL Expos	Gulf Coast League	Mike Easom

LEAGUE CHAMPIONS: Indianapolis
