= 1987 Montreal Expos season =

1987 Montreal Expos
- League: National League
- Division: East
- Ballpark: Olympic Stadium
- City: Montreal
- Record: 91–71
- Divisional place: 3rd
- Owners: Charles Bronfman
- General managers: Murray Cook, Bill Stoneman
- Managers: Buck Rodgers
- Television: CBC Television (Dave Van Horne, Jim Fanning); The Sports Network (Ken Singleton, Jim Hughson); Télévision de Radio-Canada (Claude Raymond, Raymond Lebrun)
- Radio: CFCF (English) (Dave Van Horne, Jim Fanning, Rich Griffin, Rob Faulds); CKAC (French) (Jacques Doucet, Rodger Brulotte)

The 1987 Montreal Expos season was the 19th season in franchise history. They finished third in the National League East with a 91–71 record and 4 games behind the Cardinals.

== Offseason ==
- October 7, 1986: Bert Roberge was released by the Expos.
- December 9, 1986: John Mizerock was signed as a free agent with the Montreal Expos.
- January 19, 1987: Dave Engle was signed as a free agent by the Expos.
- February 3, 1987: Jeff Reardon and Tom Nieto were traded by the Expos to the Minnesota Twins for Neal Heaton, Yorkis Pérez, Jeff Reed, and Al Cardwood (minors).
- February 16, 1987: Pascual Pérez was signed as a free agent by the Expos.
- February 20, 1987: Al Newman was traded by the Montreal Expos to the Minnesota Twins for Mike Shade (minors).

== Spring training ==
The Expos held spring training at West Palm Beach Municipal Stadium in West Palm Beach, Florida – a facility they shared with the Atlanta Braves. It was their 11th season at the stadium; they had conducted spring training there from 1969 to 1972 and since 1981.

== Regular season ==
- August 16, 1987: Tim Raines hit for the cycle in a 10–7 victory over the Pittsburgh Pirates at Olympic Stadium, going five-for-five in the process. A crowd of 26,134 were on hand to see it in Montreal.

=== Season standings ===
NL East
| Team | W | L | Pct. | GB | Home | Road |
|---|---|---|---|---|---|---|
| St. Louis Cardinals | 95 | 67 | .586 | — | 49‍–‍32 | 46‍–‍35 |
| New York Mets | 92 | 70 | .568 | 3 | 49‍–‍32 | 43‍–‍38 |
| Montreal Expos | 91 | 71 | .562 | 4 | 48‍–‍33 | 43‍–‍38 |
| Philadelphia Phillies | 80 | 82 | .494 | 15 | 43‍–‍38 | 37‍–‍44 |
| Pittsburgh Pirates | 80 | 82 | .494 | 15 | 47‍–‍34 | 33‍–‍48 |
| Chicago Cubs | 76 | 85 | .472 | 18½ | 40‍–‍40 | 36‍–‍45 |

=== Record vs. opponents ===
1987 National League record Sources:
| Team | ATL | CHC | CIN | HOU | LAD | MON | NYM | PHI | PIT | SD | SF | STL |
|---|---|---|---|---|---|---|---|---|---|---|---|---|
| Atlanta | — | 6–5 | 8–10 | 8–10 | 6–12 | 3–9 | 7–5 | 7–5 | 7–5 | 6–12 | 8–10 | 3–9 |
| Chicago | 5–6 | — | 6–6 | 8–4 | 6–6 | 10–8 | 9–9 | 8–10 | 4–14 | 9–3 | 5–7 | 6–12 |
| Cincinnati | 10–8 | 6–6 | — | 13–5 | 10–8 | 6–6 | 7–5 | 5–7 | 4–8 | 12–6 | 7–11 | 4–8 |
| Houston | 10–8 | 4–8 | 5–13 | — | 12–6 | 7–5 | 6–6 | 6–6 | 6–6 | 5–13 | 10–8 | 5–7 |
| Los Angeles | 12–6 | 6–6 | 8–10 | 6–12 | — | 3–9 | 6–6 | 2–10 | 6–6 | 11–7 | 10–8 | 3–9 |
| Montreal | 9–3 | 8–10 | 6–6 | 5–7 | 9–3 | — | 8–10 | 10–8 | 11–7 | 9–3 | 5–7 | 11–7 |
| New York | 5–7 | 9–9 | 5–7 | 6–6 | 6–6 | 10–8 | — | 13–5 | 12–6 | 8–4 | 9–3 | 9–9 |
| Philadelphia | 5–7 | 10–8 | 7–5 | 6–6 | 10–2 | 8–10 | 5–13 | — | 11–7 | 8–4 | 2–10 | 8–10 |
| Pittsburgh | 5–7 | 14–4 | 8–4 | 6–6 | 6–6 | 7–11 | 6–12 | 7–11 | — | 8–4 | 6–6 | 7–11 |
| San Diego | 12–6 | 3–9 | 6–12 | 13–5 | 7–11 | 3–9 | 4–8 | 4–8 | 4–8 | — | 5–13 | 4–8 |
| San Francisco | 10–8 | 7–5 | 11–7 | 8–10 | 8–10 | 7–5 | 3–9 | 10–2 | 6–6 | 13–5 | — | 7–5 |
| St. Louis | 9–3 | 12–6 | 8–4 | 7–5 | 9–3 | 7–11 | 9–9 | 10–8 | 11–7 | 8–4 | 5–7 | — |

=== Opening Day lineup ===
- Casey Candaele
- Tom Foley
- Andrés Galarraga
- Vance Law
- John Stefero
- Jay Tibbs
- Tim Wallach
- Mitch Webster
- Herm Winningham

=== Notable transactions ===
- May 1, 1987: Tim Raines was signed as a free agent by the Expos.
- May 4, 1987: Nelson Norman was released by the Expos.
- May 6, 1987: Dennis Martínez was signed as a free agent by the Expos.
- June 2, 1987: 1987 Major League Baseball draft
  - Nate Minchey was drafted by the Expos in the 2nd round. Player signed June 11, 1987.
  - John Vander Wal was drafted by the Expos in the 3rd round. Player signed June 6, 1987.
  - Archi Cianfrocco was drafted by the Expos in the 5th round. Player signed June 10, 1987.
- June 30, 1987: Curt Brown was sent by the Expos to the Milwaukee Brewers as part of a conditional deal.

=== Major League debuts ===
- Batters:
  - Jack Daugherty (Sep 1)
  - Alonzo Powell (Apr 6)
  - Tom Romano (Sep 1)
  - Nelson Santovenia (Sep 16)
- Pitchers:
  - Jeff Fischer (Jun 19)
  - Ubaldo Heredia (May 12)

=== Roster ===
1987 Montreal Expos
Roster
| Pitchers: 52 Curt Brown; 44 Tim Burke; 39 Bill Campbell; 39 Jeff Fischer; 26 Neal Heaton; 35 Ubaldo Heredia; 38 Joe Hesketh; 53 Charlie Lea; 32 Dennis Martínez; 22 Bob McClure; 27 Andy McGaffigan; 49 Jeff Parrett; 34 Pascual Pérez; 48 Bob Sebra; 28 Bryn Smith; 40 Lary Sorensen; 51 Randy St. Claire; 50 Jay Tibbs; 17 Floyd Youmans | Catchers: 20 Mike Fitzgerald; 24 Jeff Reed; 47 Nelson Santovenia; 19 John Stefero; Infielders: 7 Hubie Brooks; 9 Casey Candaele; 33 Jack Daugherty; 16 Tom Foley; 14 Andrés Galarraga; 6 Wallace Johnson; 2 Vance Law; 33 Nelson Norman; 12 Luis Rivera; 47 Razor Shines; 29 Tim Wallach | Outfielders: 4 Dave Engle; 5 Reid Nichols; 21 Alonzo Powell; 30 Tim Raines; 41 Tom Romano; 23 Mitch Webster; 3 Herm Winningham | Manager: 37 Buck Rodgers; Coaches: 36 Larry Bearnarth (Pitching); 60 Leonel Carrión (Assistant); 26 Ron Hansen (First Base); 31 Ken Macha (Bullpen); 42 Jackie Moore (Third Base); 1 Bobby Winkles (Hitting) |

== Player stats ==
| = Indicates team leader |

=== Batting ===
==== Starters by position ====
Note: Pos = Position; G = Games played; AB = At bats; H = Hits; Avg. = Batting average; HR = Home runs; RBI = Runs batted in; SB = Stolen bases

| Pos | Player | G | AB | H | Avg. | HR | RBI | SB |
|---|---|---|---|---|---|---|---|---|
| C | Mike Fitzgerald | 107 | 287 | 69 | .240 | 3 | 36 | 3 |
| 1B | Andrés Galarraga | 147 | 551 | 168 | .305 | 13 | 90 | 7 |
| 2B | Vance Law | 133 | 436 | 119 | .273 | 12 | 56 | 8 |
| 3B | Tim Wallach | 153 | 593 | 177 | .298 | 26 | 123 | 9 |
| SS | Hubie Brooks | 112 | 430 | 113 | .263 | 14 | 72 | 4 |
| LF | Tim Raines | 139 | 530 | 175 | .330 | 18 | 68 | 50 |
| CF | Herm Winningham | 137 | 347 | 83 | .239 | 4 | 41 | 29 |
| RF | Mitch Webster | 156 | 588 | 165 | .281 | 15 | 63 | 33 |

==== Other batters ====
Note: G = Games played; AB = At bats; H = Hits; Avg. = Batting average; HR = Home runs; RBI = Runs batted in; SB = Stolen bases

| Player | G | AB | H | Avg. | HR | RBI | SB |
|---|---|---|---|---|---|---|---|
| Casey Candaele | 138 | 449 | 122 | .272 | 1 | 23 | 7 |
| Tom Foley | 106 | 280 | 82 | .293 | 5 | 28 | 6 |
| Jeff Reed | 75 | 207 | 44 | .213 | 1 | 21 | 0 |
| Reid Nichols | 77 | 147 | 39 | .265 | 4 | 20 | 2 |
| Wallace Johnson | 75 | 85 | 21 | .247 | 1 | 14 | 5 |
| Dave Engle | 59 | 84 | 19 | .226 | 1 | 14 | 1 |
| John Stefero | 18 | 56 | 11 | .196 | 1 | 3 | 0 |
| Alonzo Powell | 14 | 41 | 8 | .195 | 0 | 4 | 0 |
| Luis Rivera | 18 | 32 | 5 | .156 | 0 | 1 | 0 |
| Jack Daugherty | 11 | 10 | 1 | .100 | 0 | 0 | 0 |
| Razor Shines | 6 | 9 | 2 | .222 | 0 | 0 | 1 |
| Nelson Norman | 1 | 4 | 0 | .000 | 0 | 0 | 0 |
| Tom Romano | 7 | 3 | 0 | .000 | 0 | 0 | 0 |
| Nelson Santovenia | 2 | 1 | 0 | .000 | 0 | 0 | 0 |

=== Pitching ===
==== Starting pitchers ====
Note: G = Games pitched; IP = Innings pitched; W = Wins; L = Losses; ERA = Earned run average; SO = Strikeouts

| Player | G | IP | W | L | ERA | SO |
|---|---|---|---|---|---|---|
| Neal Heaton | 32 | 193.1 | 13 | 10 | 4.52 | 105 |
| Bob Sebra | 36 | 177.1 | 6 | 15 | 4.42 | 156 |
| Bryn Smith | 26 | 150.1 | 10 | 9 | 4.37 | 94 |
| Dennis Martínez | 22 | 144.2 | 11 | 4 | 3.30 | 84 |
| Floyd Youmans | 23 | 116.1 | 9 | 8 | 4.64 | 94 |
| Pascual Pérez | 10 | 70.1 | 7 | 0 | 2.30 | 58 |
| Ubaldo Heredia | 2 | 10.0 | 0 | 1 | 5.40 | 6 |
| Charlie Lea | 1 | 1.0 | 0 | 1 | 36.00 | 1 |

==== Other pitchers ====
Note: G = Games pitched; IP = Innings pitched; W = Wins; L = Losses; ERA = Earned run average; SO = Strikeouts

| Player | G | IP | W | L | ERA | SO |
|---|---|---|---|---|---|---|
| Jay Tibbs | 19 | 83.0 | 4 | 5 | 4.99 | 54 |
| Lary Sorensen | 23 | 47.2 | 3 | 4 | 4.72 | 21 |
| Jeff Fischer | 4 | 13.2 | 0 | 1 | 8.56 | 6 |

==== Relief pitchers ====
Note: G = Games pitched; W = Wins; L = Losses; SV = Saves; ERA = Earned run average; SO = Strikeouts

| Player | G | W | L | SV | ERA | SO |
|---|---|---|---|---|---|---|
| Tim Burke | 55 | 7 | 0 | 18 | 1.19 | 58 |
| Andy McGaffigan | 69 | 5 | 2 | 12 | 2.39 | 100 |
| Bob McClure | 52 | 6 | 1 | 5 | 3.44 | 33 |
| Jeff Parrett | 45 | 7 | 6 | 6 | 4.21 | 56 |
| Randy St. Claire | 44 | 3 | 3 | 7 | 4.03 | 43 |
| Joe Hesketh | 18 | 0 | 0 | 1 | 3.14 | 31 |
| Bill Campbell | 7 | 0 | 0 | 0 | 8.10 | 4 |
| Curt Brown | 5 | 0 | 1 | 0 | 7.71 | 6 |
| Vance Law | 3 | 0 | 0 | 0 | 5.40 | 2 |
| Tim Wallach | 1 | 0 | 0 | 0 | 0.00 | 0 |

== Awards and honors ==
- Tim Wallach, Silver Slugger Award

1987 Major League Baseball All-Star Game

- Tim Raines, outfield
- Tim Raines, All-Star Game Most Valuable Player

== Farm system ==
| Level | Team | League | Manager |
|---|---|---|---|
| AAA | Indianapolis Indians | American Association | Joe Sparks |
| AA | Jacksonville Expos | Southern League | Tommy Thompson |
| A | West Palm Beach Expos | Florida State League | Felipe Alou |
| A | Burlington Expos | Midwest League | J. R. Miner |
| A-Short Season | Jamestown Expos | New York–Penn League | Gene Glynn |
| Rookie | GCL Expos | Gulf Coast League | Jethro McIntyre |

LEAGUE CHAMPIONS: Indianapolis
