= List of Washington Nationals minor league affiliates =

Locations of Washington Nationals' current top four minor league affiliates.

The Washington Nationals farm system consists of six Minor League Baseball affiliates across the United States and in the Dominican Republic. Four teams are independently owned, while two—the Florida Complex League Nationals and Dominican Summer League Nationals—are owned by the major league club.

From 1969 to 2004, the Washington Nationals played as the Montreal Expos. The Expos-Nationals franchise has been affiliated with the Double-A Harrisburg Senators of the Eastern League since 1991, making it the longest-running affiliation in the organization among teams not owned by the Nationals. Washington's newest affiliates are the Triple-A Rochester Red Wings of the International League and the High-A Wilmington Blue Rocks of the South Atlantic League, which became Nationals affiliates in 2021.

Geographically, Washington's closest domestic affiliate is the Single-A Fredericksburg Nationals of the Carolina League, which are approximately 47 miles (76 km) away. Washington's furthest domestic affiliate is the FCL Nationals of the Florida Complex League some 860 miles (1,380 km) away.

== Current affiliates ==
The Washington Nationals farm system consists of six minor league affiliates.

Class	Team	League	Location	Ballpark	Affiliated
Triple-A	Rochester Red Wings	International League	Rochester, New York	ESL Ballpark	2021
Double-A	Harrisburg Senators	Eastern League	Harrisburg, Pennsylvania	FNB Field	1991
High-A	Wilmington Blue Rocks	South Atlantic League	Wilmington, Delaware	Daniel S. Frawley Stadium	2021
Single-A	Fredericksburg Nationals	Carolina League	Fredericksburg, Virginia	Virginia Credit Union Stadium	2020
Rookie	FCL Nationals	Florida Complex League	West Palm Beach, Florida	The Ballpark of the Palm Beaches	1986
Rookie	DSL Nationals	Dominican Summer League	Boca Chica, Santo Domingo	Las Américas Complex	2009

== Past affiliates ==
=== Key ===
Season	Each year is linked to an article about that particular Nationals/Expos season.

=== 1969–1989 ===
Prior to the 1963 season, Major League Baseball (MLB) initiated a reorganization of Minor League Baseball that resulted in a reduction from six classes to four (Triple-A, Double-A, Class A, and Rookie) in response to the general decline of the minors throughout the 1950s and early-1960s when leagues and teams folded due to shrinking attendance caused by baseball fans' preference for staying at home to watch MLB games on television. The only change made within the next 27 years was Class A being subdivided for the first time to form Class A Short Season in 1966.

Season	Triple-A	Double-A	Class A	Class A Short Season	Rookie	Ref(s).
1969	Vancouver Mounties (Note: In 1969, the Expos shared the Triple-A Vancouver Mounties with the Seattle Pilots.)	—	West Palm Beach Expos	—	GCL Expos	
1970	Buffalo Bisons / Winnipeg Whips	Jacksonville Suns (Note: In 1970, the Expos shared the Double-A Jacksonville Suns with the Milwaukee Brewers.)	West Palm Beach Expos	Watertown Expos	GCL Expos	
1971	Winnipeg Whips	Québec Carnavals	West Palm Beach Expos	Jamestown Falcons; Watertown Expos	—	
1972	Peninsula Whips	Québec Carnavals	West Palm Beach Expos	Jamestown Falcons	Cocoa Expos	
1973	Peninsula Whips	Québec Carnavals	West Palm Beach Expos	Jamestown Expos	—	
1974	Memphis Blues	Québec Carnavals	Kinston Expos; West Palm Beach Expos	—	GCL Expos	
1975	Memphis Blues	Québec Carnavals	West Palm Beach Expos	—	Lethbridge Expos	
1976	Denver Bears	Québec Metros	West Palm Beach Expos	—	Lethbridge Expos	
1977	Denver Bears	Québec Metros	West Palm Beach Expos	Jamestown Expos	GCL Expos	
1978	Denver Bears	Memphis Chicks	West Palm Beach Expos	Jamestown Expos	—	
1979	Denver Bears	Memphis Chicks	West Palm Beach Expos	Jamestown Expos	Calgary Expos	
1980	Denver Bears	Memphis Chicks	West Palm Beach Expos	Jamestown Expos	Calgary Expos	
1981	Denver Bears	Memphis Chicks	West Palm Beach Expos	Jamestown Expos	Calgary Expos	
1982	Wichita Aeros	Memphis Chicks	San Jose Expos; West Palm Beach Expos	Jamestown Expos	Calgary Expos	
1983	Wichita Aeros	Memphis Chicks	Gastonia Expos; West Palm Beach Expos	Jamestown Expos	Calgary Expos	
1984	Indianapolis Indians	Jacksonville Suns	Gastonia Expos; West Palm Beach Expos	Jamestown Expos	Calgary Expos	
1985	Indianapolis Indians	Jacksonville Expos	West Palm Beach Expos	Jamestown Expos	—	
1986	Indianapolis Indians	Jacksonville Expos	Burlington Expos; West Palm Beach Expos	Jamestown Expos	GCL Expos	
1987	Indianapolis Indians	Jacksonville Expos	Burlington Bees; West Palm Beach Expos	Jamestown Expos	GCL Expos	
1988	Indianapolis Indians	Jacksonville Expos	Rockford Expos; West Palm Beach Expos	Jamestown Expos	GCL Expos	
1989	Indianapolis Indians	Jacksonville Expos	Rockford Expos; West Palm Beach Expos	Jamestown Expos	GCL Expos; DSL Expos	

=== 1990–2020 ===
Minor League Baseball operated with six classes from 1990 to 2020. In 1990, the Class A level was subdivided for a second time with the creation of Class A-Advanced. The Rookie level consisted of domestic and foreign circuits.

Season	Triple-A	Double-A	Class A-Advanced	Class A	Class A Short Season	Rookie	Foreign Rookie	Ref(s).
1990	Indianapolis Indians	Jacksonville Expos	West Palm Beach Expos	Rockford Expos	Jamestown Expos	GCL Expos	DSL Expos	
1991	Indianapolis Indians	Harrisburg Senators	West Palm Beach Expos	Rockford Expos; Sumter Flyers	Jamestown Expos	GCL Expos	DSL Expos	
1992	Indianapolis Indians	Harrisburg Senators	West Palm Beach Expos	Albany Polecats; Rockford Expos	Jamestown Expos	GCL Expos	DSL Expos	
1993	Ottawa Lynx	Harrisburg Senators	West Palm Beach Expos	Burlington Bees	Jamestown Expos	GCL Expos	DSL Expos	
1994	Ottawa Lynx	Harrisburg Senators	West Palm Beach Expos	Burlington Bees	Vermont Expos	GCL Expos	DSL Expos	
1995	Ottawa Lynx	Harrisburg Senators	West Palm Beach Expos	Albany Polecats	Vermont Expos	GCL Expos	DSL Expos	
1996	Ottawa Lynx	Harrisburg Senators	West Palm Beach Expos	Delmarva Shorebirds	Vermont Expos	GCL Expos	DSL Expos	
1997	Ottawa Lynx	Harrisburg Senators	West Palm Beach Expos	Cape Fear Crocs	Vermont Expos	GCL Expos	DSL Expos	
1998	Ottawa Lynx	Harrisburg Senators	Jupiter Hammerheads	Cape Fear Crocs	Vermont Expos	GCL Expos	DSL Expos	
1999	Ottawa Lynx	Harrisburg Senators	Jupiter Hammerheads	Cape Fear Crocs	Vermont Expos	GCL Expos	DSL Expos	
2000	Ottawa Lynx	Harrisburg Senators	Jupiter Hammerheads	Cape Fear Crocs	Vermont Expos	GCL Expos	DSL Expos	
2001	Ottawa Lynx	Harrisburg Senators	Jupiter Hammerheads	Clinton LumberKings	Vermont Expos	GCL Expos	DSL Expos	
2002	Ottawa Lynx	Harrisburg Senators	Brevard County Manatees	Clinton LumberKings	Vermont Expos	GCL Expos	DSL Expos	
2003	Edmonton Trappers	Harrisburg Senators	Brevard County Manatees	Savannah Sand Gnats	Vermont Expos	GCL Expos	DSL Expos/Diamondbacks	
2004	Edmonton Trappers	Harrisburg Senators	Brevard County Manatees	Savannah Sand Gnats	Vermont Expos	GCL Expos	DSL Expos	
2005	New Orleans Zephyrs	Harrisburg Senators	Potomac Nationals	Savannah Sand Gnats	Vermont Expos	GCL Nationals	DSL Nationals; VSL Nationals/Marlins	
2006	New Orleans Zephyrs	Harrisburg Senators	Potomac Nationals	Savannah Sand Gnats	Vermont Lake Monsters	GCL Nationals	DSL Nationals 1 DSL Nationals 2	
2007	Columbus Clippers	Harrisburg Senators	Potomac Nationals	Hagerstown Suns	Vermont Lake Monsters	GCL Nationals	DSL Nationals 1 DSL Nationals 2	
2008	Columbus Clippers	Harrisburg Senators	Potomac Nationals	Hagerstown Suns	Vermont Lake Monsters	GCL Nationals	DSL Nationals 1 DSL Nationals 2	
2009	Syracuse Chiefs	Harrisburg Senators	Potomac Nationals	Hagerstown Suns	Vermont Lake Monsters	GCL Nationals	DSL Nationals	
2010	Syracuse Chiefs	Harrisburg Senators	Potomac Nationals	Hagerstown Suns	Vermont Lake Monsters	GCL Nationals	DSL Nationals	
2011	Syracuse Chiefs	Harrisburg Senators	Potomac Nationals	Hagerstown Suns	Auburn Doubledays	GCL Nationals	DSL Nationals	
2012	Syracuse Chiefs	Harrisburg Senators	Potomac Nationals	Hagerstown Suns	Auburn Doubledays	GCL Nationals	DSL Nationals	
2013	Syracuse Chiefs	Harrisburg Senators	Potomac Nationals	Hagerstown Suns	Auburn Doubledays	GCL Nationals	DSL Nationals	
2014	Syracuse Chiefs	Harrisburg Senators	Potomac Nationals	Hagerstown Suns	Auburn Doubledays	GCL Nationals	DSL Nationals	
2015	Syracuse Chiefs	Harrisburg Senators	Potomac Nationals	Hagerstown Suns	Auburn Doubledays	GCL Nationals	DSL Nationals	
2016	Syracuse Chiefs	Harrisburg Senators	Potomac Nationals	Hagerstown Suns	Auburn Doubledays	GCL Nationals	DSL Nationals	
2017	Syracuse Chiefs	Harrisburg Senators	Potomac Nationals	Hagerstown Suns	Auburn Doubledays	GCL Nationals	DSL Nationals	
2018	Syracuse Chiefs	Harrisburg Senators	Potomac Nationals	Hagerstown Suns	Auburn Doubledays	GCL Nationals	DSL Nationals	
2019	Fresno Grizzlies	Harrisburg Senators	Potomac Nationals	Hagerstown Suns	Auburn Doubledays	GCL Nationals	DSL Nationals	
2020 (Note: The 2020 Minor League Baseball season was cancelled due to the COVID-19 pandemic.)	Fresno Grizzlies	Harrisburg Senators	Fredericksburg Nationals	Hagerstown Suns	Auburn Doubledays	GCL Nationals	DSL Nationals	

=== 2021–present ===
The current structure of Minor League Baseball is the result of an overall contraction of the system beginning with the 2021 season. Class A was reduced to two levels: High-A and Low-A. Low-A was reclassified as Single-A in 2022.

Season	Triple-A	Double-A	High-A	Single-A	Rookie	Foreign Rookie	Ref.
2021	Rochester Red Wings	Harrisburg Senators	Wilmington Blue Rocks	Fredericksburg Nationals	FCL Nationals	DSL Nationals	
2022	Rochester Red Wings	Harrisburg Senators	Wilmington Blue Rocks	Fredericksburg Nationals	FCL Nationals	DSL Nationals	
2023	Rochester Red Wings	Harrisburg Senators	Wilmington Blue Rocks	Fredericksburg Nationals	FCL Nationals	DSL Nationals	
2024	Rochester Red Wings	Harrisburg Senators	Wilmington Blue Rocks	Fredericksburg Nationals	FCL Nationals	DSL Nationals	
2025	Rochester Red Wings	Harrisburg Senators	Wilmington Blue Rocks	Fredericksburg Nationals	FCL Nationals	DSL Nationals	
2026	Rochester Red Wings	Harrisburg Senators	Wilmington Blue Rocks	Fredericksburg Nationals	FCL Nationals	DSL Nationals	
