= List of Montreal Expos Opening Day starting pitchers =

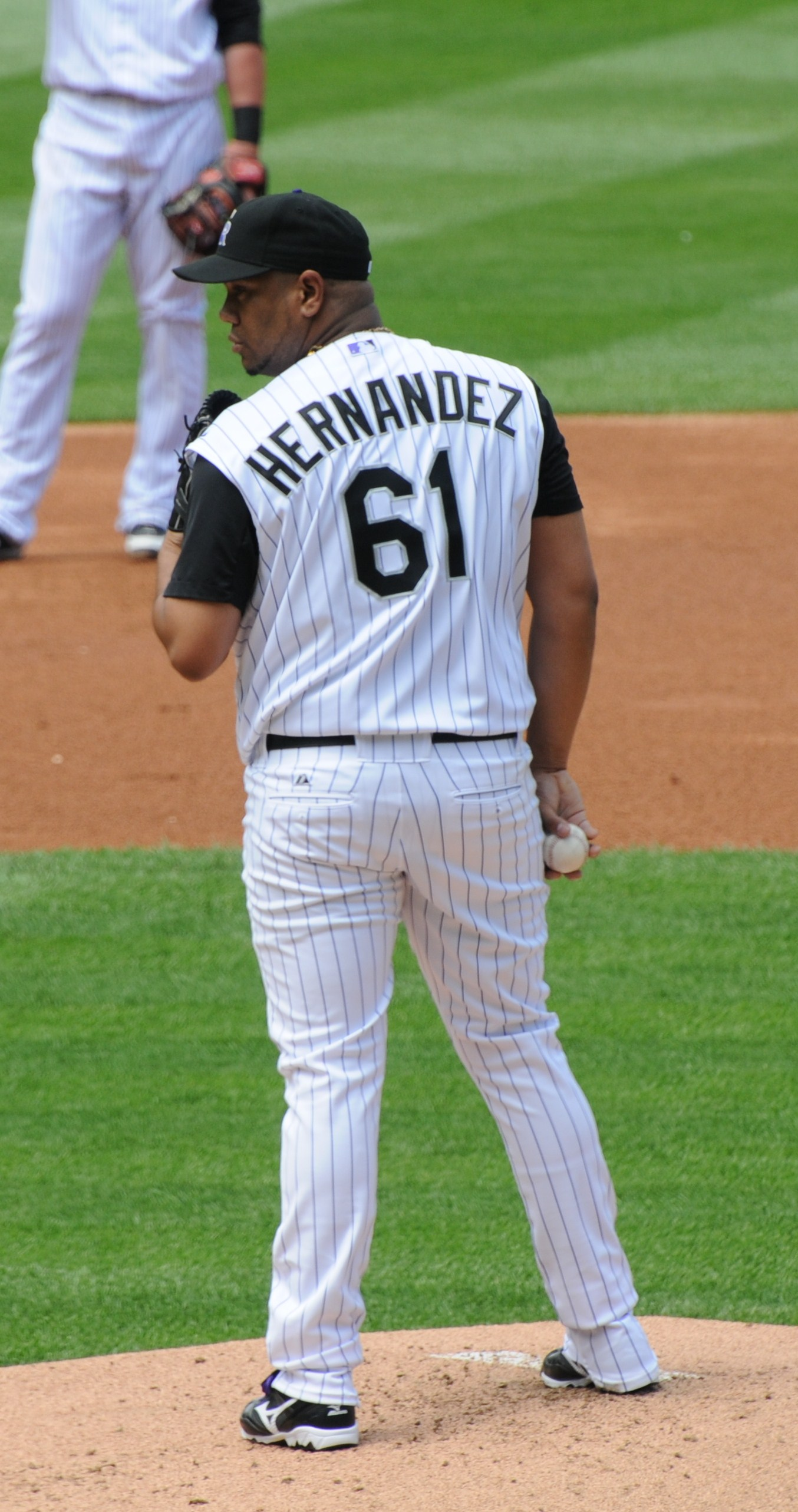
Liván Hernández, who made one Opening Day start for the Expos franchise.

The Montreal Expos were a former Major League Baseball (MLB) franchise based in Montreal, Quebec from 1969 to 2004. The team relocated to Washington, D.C. after the 2004 season and became the Washington Nationals. The first game of the new baseball season for a team is played on Opening Day, and being named the Opening Day starter is an honour, which is often given to the player who is expected to lead the pitching staff that season, though there are various strategic reasons why a team's best pitcher might not start on Opening Day. The Expos used 19 different Opening Day starting pitchers in their 36 seasons. The 19 starters had a combined Opening Day record of 9 wins, 15 losses (9–15) and 12 no decisions. No decisions are awarded to the starting pitcher if the game is won or lost after the starting pitcher has left the game, or if the starting pitcher does not pitch at least five innings with the lead. The overall Opening Day franchise record is 12–24.

Steve Rogers holds the team record for most Opening Day starts with nine, and has an Opening Day record of 2–4, with three no-decisions. All of Rogers's Opening Day starts were on the road. Liván Hernández is the only pitcher to have made Opening Day starts for both the Expos (in 2004) and Nationals (2005, 2006, and 2011).

For their first 19 Opening Day games, early season cold weather kept the Expos on the road. In 1988, the availability of Olympic Stadium and its retractable roof allowed the team to have its first Opening Day home game, in which Dennis Martínez was the starting pitcher. The Expos never played on Opening Day in Jarry Park Stadium, their home from 1969 to 1976. Olympic Stadium, their home from 1977 to 2004, hosted six Opening Day games; five Expos starters accumulated a record of 0–3 (and three no-decisions).

The franchise's only playoff experience was in the strike-shortened 1981 season. In a special format created for that season, the Expos were the second-half champion, with a 30–23 record. The team won the NL Division Series to become Eastern Division champions, winning three games to two over Philadelphia Phillies who had been the first-half champion with a 34–21 record. In 1981, Opening Day pitcher Steve Rogers faced Phillies ace Steve Carlton and won the first game of the series by a score of 3–1. The Expos then lost the NL Championship Series to the first-half Western Division champion Los Angeles Dodgers three games to two on a ninth-inning home run in Game 5 by Rick Monday.

== Key ==
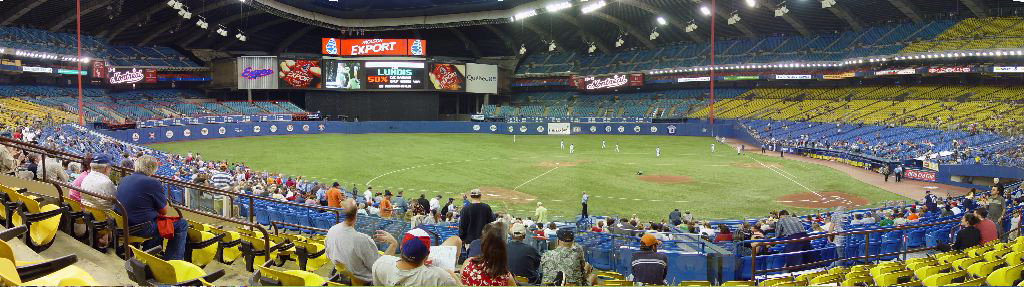
Olympic Stadium, home to the Expos from 1977–2004, hosted six Opening Day games.

Season	Each year is linked to an article about that particular Expos season.
W	Win
L	Loss
ND (W)	No decision for starter; Expos won game
ND (L)	No decision for starter; Expos lost game
Final; Score	Game score with Expos runs listed first
Location	**Stadium in bold** for home game
Pitcher (#)	Number of appearances as Opening Day starter with the Expos
*	Advanced to the NLCS

== Pitchers ==
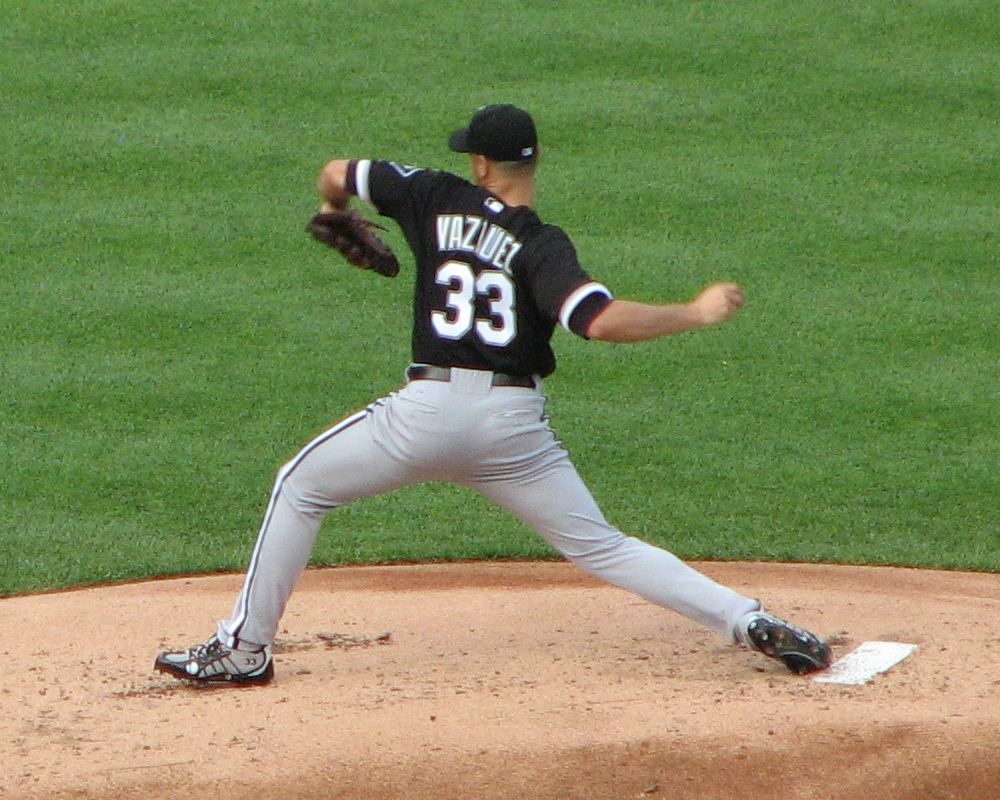
Javier Vázquez, the 2001 and 2002 Opening Day starter

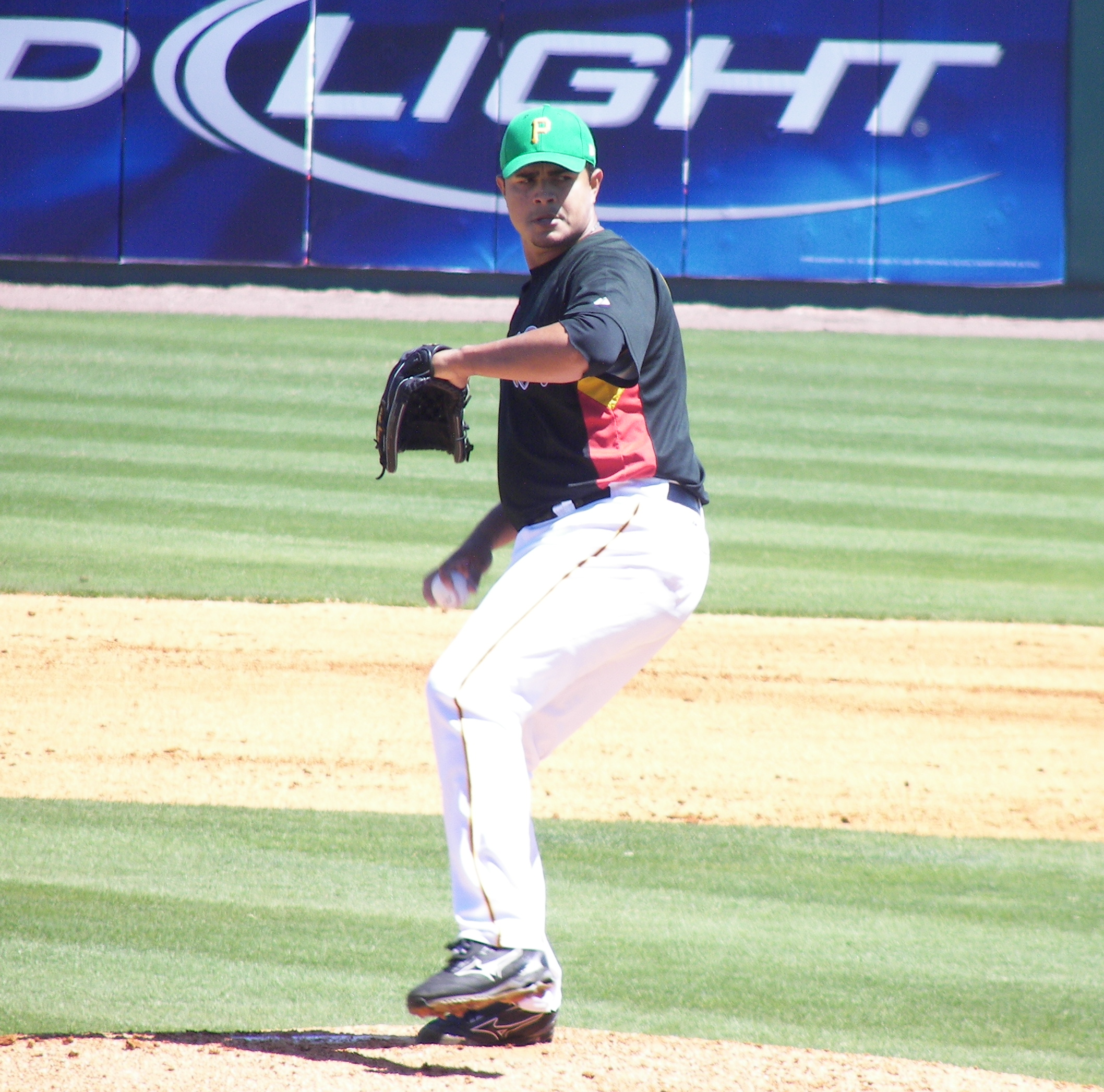
Tony Armas Jr., the 2003 Opening Day starter

Season	Pitcher	Decision	Final score	Opponent	Location	Attendance	Ref(s)
1969	Mudcat Grant	ND (W)	11–10	New York Mets	Shea Stadium	44,541	
1970	Joe Sparma	L	1–5	Cincinnati Reds	Crosley Field	30,124	
1971	Carl Morton	L	2–4	New York Mets	Shea Stadium	26,062	
1972	Bill Stoneman	W	3–2	St. Louis Cardinals	Busch Stadium	7,808	
1973	Mike Torrez	L	2–3	Chicago Cubs	Wrigley Field	40,273	
1974	Steve Renko	ND (W)	12–8	Pittsburgh Pirates	Three Rivers Stadium	40,434	
1975	Dave McNally	W	8–4	St. Louis Cardinals	Busch Stadium	31,769	
1976	Steve Rogers	L	2–3	New York Mets	Shea Stadium	17,013	
1977	Steve Rogers (2)	ND (W)	4–3	Philadelphia Phillies	Veterans Stadium	43,367	
1978	Steve Rogers (3)	L	1–3	New York Mets	Shea Stadium	11,376	
1979	Steve Rogers (4)	ND (W)	3–2 (10 innings)	Pittsburgh Pirates	Three Rivers Stadium	36,141	
1980	Steve Rogers (5)	L	3–6	Philadelphia Phillies	Veterans Stadium	48,460	
1981*	Steve Rogers (6)	ND (W)	6–5	Pittsburgh Pirates	Three Rivers Stadium	40,332	
1982	Steve Rogers (7)	W	2–0	Philadelphia Phillies	Veterans Stadium	7,795	
1983	Steve Rogers (8)	W	3–0	Chicago Cubs	Wrigley Field	4,802	
1984	Charlie Lea	W	4–2	Houston Astros	Astrodome	28,105	
1985	Steve Rogers (9)	L	1–4	Cincinnati Reds	Cinergy Field	52,971	
1986	Bryn Smith	L	0–6	Atlanta Braves	Atlanta–Fulton County Stadium	37,858	
1987	Floyd Youmans	L	5–11	Cincinnati Reds	Cinergy Field	55,166	
1988	Dennis Martínez	L	6–10	New York Mets	**Olympic Stadium**	55,413	
1989	Dennis Martínez (2)	ND (W)	6–5	Pittsburgh Pirates	**Olympic Stadium**	35,154	
1990	Dennis Martínez (3)	ND (L)	5–6 (11 innings)	St. Louis Cardinals	Busch Stadium	48,752	
1991	Dennis Martínez (4)	W	7–0	Pittsburgh Pirates	Three Rivers Stadium	54,274	
1992	Dennis Martínez (5)	L	0–2	Pittsburgh Pirates	Three Rivers Stadium	48,800	
1993	Dennis Martínez (6)	L	1–2	Cincinnati Reds	Cinergy Field	55,456	
1994	Jeff Fassero	ND (L)	5–6 (12 innings)	Houston Astros	Astrodome	43,440	
1995	Jeff Fassero (2)	W	6–2	Pittsburgh Pirates	Three Rivers Stadium	34,841	
1996†	Jeff Fassero (3)	L	1–4	Cincinnati Reds	Cinergy Field	53,136	
1997	Jim Bullinger	ND (W)	2–1	St. Louis Cardinals	**Olympic Stadium**	33,437	
1998	Carlos Pérez	L	0–4	Pittsburgh Pirates	**Olympic Stadium**	31,200	
1999	Dustin Hermanson	W	9–2	Pittsburgh Pirates	Three Rivers Stadium	43,405	
2000	Dustin Hermanson (2)	L	4–10	Los Angeles Dodgers	**Olympic Stadium**	51,249	
2001	Javier Vázquez	ND (W)	5–4	Chicago Cubs	Wrigley Field	38,466	
2002	Javier Vázquez (2)	ND (W)	7–6	Florida Marlins	**Olympic Stadium**	34,351	
2003	Tony Armas Jr.	W	10–2	Atlanta Braves	Turner Field	40,258	
2004	Liván Hernández	ND (L)	3–4	Florida Marlins	Dolphin Stadium	55,315	

† The scheduled Opening Day starter for April 1, 1996, was Pedro Martínez. Due to the death of umpire John McSherry, the game was postponed. Jeff Fassero then started the April 2 makeup game.
