= Jerome Brown =

American football player (1965–1992)

- Brown with the Philadelphia Eagles in 1991

No. 99
- Position: Defensive tackle

Personal information
- Born: February 4, 1965; Brooksville, Florida, U.S.
- Died: June 25, 1992 (aged 27); Brooksville, Florida, U.S.
- Listed height: 6 ft 2 in (1.88 m)
- Listed weight: 292 lb (132 kg)

Career information
- High school: Hernando (Brooksville)
- College: Miami (FL)
- NFL draft: 1987: 1st round, 9th overall pick

Career history
- Philadelphia Eagles (1987–1991)

Awards and highlights
- 2× First-team All-Pro (1990, 1991); 2× Pro Bowl (1990, 1991); PFWA All-Rookie Team (1987); Philadelphia Eagles 75th Anniversary Team; Philadelphia Eagles Hall of Fame; Philadelphia Eagles No. 99 retired; National champion (1983); UPI Lineman of the Year (1986); Unanimous All-American (1986); Second-team All-American (1985)

Career NFL statistics
- Games played: 76
- Sacks: 29.5
- Fumble recoveries: 10
- Interceptions: 3
- Stats at Pro Football Reference

Willie Jerome Brown III (February 4, 1965 – June 25, 1992) was an American professional football defensive tackle who played for the Philadelphia Eagles of the National Football League (NFL). He played his entire five-year NFL career with the Eagles from 1987 to 1991, before his death just before the 1992 season. He was selected to two Pro Bowls in 1990 and 1991. He played college football for the Miami Hurricanes.

== Early life and education ==
Brown graduated from Hernando High School in Brooksville, Florida, where he was often seen in the off season running laps around the track. In June 1988, he received praise for his calm demeanor as he helped disperse a group of Ku Klux Klan protesters in Brooksville, Florida.

== College career ==
Brown played college football at the University of Miami, where he was a standout player for one of college football's most successful and perhaps its most dominant program.

Among his more notable moments as a Miami player, five days before the 1987 Fiesta Bowl, at a promotional Fiesta Bowl dinner with the Penn State team, Brown led a walkout by the Miami players. Leading the walkout, he asked: "Did the Japanese go and sit down and have dinner with Pearl Harbor before they bombed them?" Brown and his teammates felt that the Penn State players had disrespected them by openly mocking Miami's coach, Jimmy Johnson, at a pre-game banquet. Penn State beat the heavily favored Hurricanes 14–10, and were declared National Champions.

Days earlier, Brown and fellow University of Miami player Dan Sileo drew even greater national controversy when each were seen deplaning a chartered University of Miami plane at Phoenix's Sky Harbor International Airport, wearing Battle Dress Uniforms. He graduated from the University of Miami in 1987.

== Professional career ==
Pre-draft measurables
Height	Weight	Arm length	Hand span	40-yard dash	10-yard split	20-yard split	Bench press
6 ft 2 1/4 in (1.89 m)	292 lb (132 kg)	33 in (0.84 m)	9 3/4 in (0.25 m)	4.86 s	1.72 s	2.83 s	17 reps
All values from NFL Combine

Brown was drafted in the first round (ninth overall) of the 1987 NFL draft by the Philadelphia Eagles.

Brown was one of the Eagles' four holdouts that offseason, but ended up signing a four-year contract with the team less than a month before the season began. During his rookie season, Brown suffered elbow chips that required off-season surgery. He finished his rookie season with four sacks, two interceptions, and one fumble recovered.

The Eagles resigned Brown to a three-year-contract in 1990, one day after resigning Seth Joyner and Clyde Simmons.

During his five-year professional career with the Eagles, he was twice selected to the Pro Bowl (in 1990 and 1991).

== Death and legacy ==
Brown died on June 25, 1992, at the age of 27, following an automobile accident in Brooksville, Florida, in which both he and his 12-year-old nephew were killed when Brown lost control of his ZR1 Chevrolet Corvette at high speed and crashed into a palm tree. Brown was buried in his hometown of Brooksville.

In 2000, the Jerome Brown Community Center was opened in Brooksville in memory of Brown.

Brown's son Dee Brown (born 1982) was drafted in the 10th round of the 2005 MLB draft by the Washington Nationals. He played four seasons of minor league baseball as an outfielder in the Nationals farm system and another two seasons with the Winnipeg Goldeyes of the independent Northern League.

Brown and former teammate Reggie White were documented together in an episode of the NFL Network series A Football Life that aired in 2011. White, who died in 2004, was invited to speak at a Billy Graham Crusade being held in Philadelphia the day Brown was killed and was informed just before he went on stage of his friend's death. When he came up to the pulpit to speak, White deviated from his prepared remarks and his speech opened with the following:

Tonight, I had planned on sharing my testimony, but it's kinda been altered. Today I lost a great friend; Philadelphia lost a great player, Jerome Brown died today.

An emotional White, pausing to wipe tears from his eyes, continued as the crowd gasped in shock at hearing that Brown was dead. He said that Brown was one of the best men he ever knew, praised his family, and called him one of his best friends.

=== Legacy ===
Along with teammate Reggie White, Brown helped anchor an Eagles defense that intimidated and dominated offenses of the late 1980s and early 1990s. By the end of the 1991 season, Brown had established himself as one of the league's premier defensive tackles, being elected as an All-Pro for a second consecutive year. Brown was not only a fan favorite, but a favorite of his first NFL head coach Buddy Ryan, who once remarked, "if you had 45 Jerome Browns, you would win every game."

Brown's jersey number (#99) was retired by the Eagles on September 6, 1992, in an emotional pre-game ceremony at Veterans Stadium, prior to the Eagles' first game of the 1992 season. After his death, Eagles players and fans started the unofficial motto "Bring it home for Jerome," a reference among Eagles fans to bringing a Super Bowl title to the city in Brown's honor. The Eagles would win Super Bowl LII on February 4, 2018, which would have been Brown's 53rd birthday.

== See also ==
- List of gridiron football players who died during their careers
