= Jamie Quirk =

American baseball player and coach (born 1954)

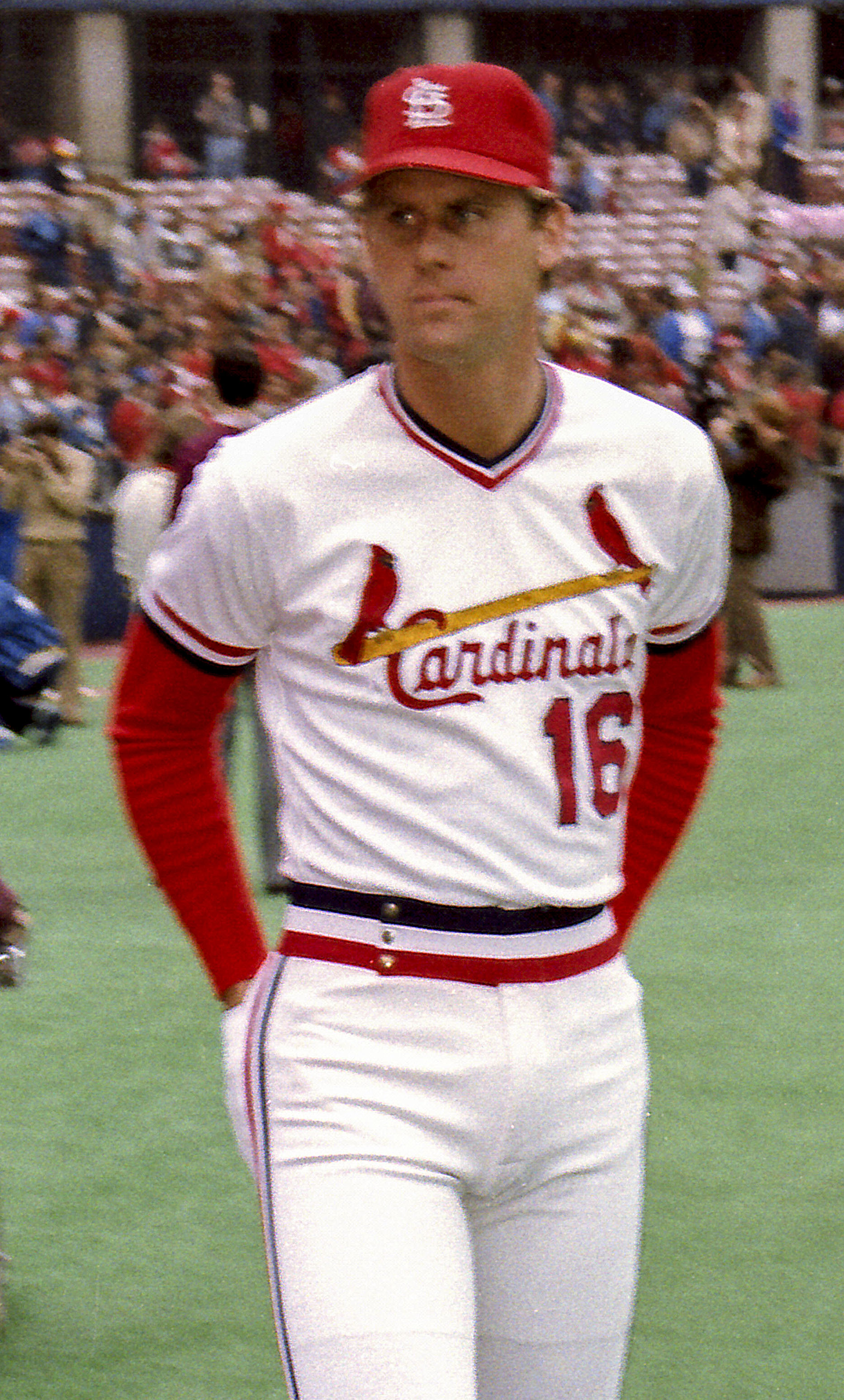
- Catcher
- Born: October 22, 1954 (age 71); Whittier, California, U.S.
- Batted: Left Threw: Right

MLB debut
- September 4, 1975, for the Kansas City Royals

Last MLB appearance
- October 4, 1992, for the Oakland Athletics

MLB statistics
- Batting average: .240
- Home runs: 43
- Runs batted in: 247
- Stats at Baseball Reference

Teams
- As player: Kansas City Royals (1975–1976); Milwaukee Brewers (1977); Kansas City Royals (1978–1982); St. Louis Cardinals (1983); Chicago White Sox (1984); Cleveland Indians (1984); Kansas City Royals (1985–1988); New York Yankees (1989); Oakland Athletics (1989); Baltimore Orioles (1989); Oakland Athletics (1990–1992); As coach: Kansas City Royals (1994–2001); Texas Rangers (2002); Colorado Rockies (2003–2008); Houston Astros (2009–2011); Chicago Cubs (2012–2013)

Career highlights and awards
- World Series champion (1985)

James Patrick Quirk (/ˈkwɜːrk/; born October 22, 1954) is an American former professional baseball player and coach. He played as a catcher in Major League Baseball from 1975 to 1992. Quirk was a member of the world champion 1985 Kansas City Royals team.

== Playing career ==
Quirk was born in Whittier, California. He was a Parade All-America quarterback at St. Paul High School in Santa Fe Springs, California where, upon graduation, he was offered a four-year football scholarship to the University of Notre Dame. Quirk attended Whittier College.

Quirk played for the Kansas City Royals, Milwaukee Brewers, St. Louis Cardinals, Chicago White Sox, New York Yankees, Oakland Athletics, Cleveland Indians and Baltimore Orioles in a career that spanned the years 1975–1992.

On September 27, 1984, Quirk hit a game-winning home run in the bottom of the ninth inning for the Cleveland Indians in a game against the Minnesota Twins. It was the only plate appearance Quirk had for the Indians, and was meaningless for Cleveland, which was in sixth place in its division. But the home run was crucial for Quirk's former team of seven years, the Kansas City Royals, which was in a tight race with the Twins for the American League West division crown. With Quirk's home run, the Royals moved two games ahead of the Twins with three to play. The Royals clinched the division the next day. Quirk would return to the Royals in 1985 and play four more years in Kansas City.

== Coaching career ==
Quirk began his coaching career with the Kansas City Royals in 1994 as the bullpen coach from 1994 to 1995, and then as bench coach from 1996 to 2001. He then became the bullpen coach for the Texas Rangers for the 2002 Season. Quirk moved on to become bench coach for the Colorado Rockies from 2003 to 2008 under manager Clint Hurdle. From 2010 to 2011, Quirk served as bullpen coach for the Houston Astros under manager Brad Mills. On November 29, 2011, Quirk became the bench coach for the Chicago Cubs to serve under newly-hired manager Dale Sveum where he served until 2013.

On September 6, 2012, Quirk was involved in a benches-clearing incident during a game between the Cubs and the Washington Nationals. Quirk was yelling from his own dugout, apparently at Nationals third base coach Bo Porter, causing Porter to leave his position on the field and approach Quirk. Ultimately, both teams came out onto the field and Quirk was ejected by umpire Jerry Layne.

He was the manager of the Lake Elsinore Storm and the San Antonio Missions in the San Diego Padres system before he was promoted to the El Paso Chihuahuas on June 17, 2015. Quirk managed the Kansas City Royals-affiliated Wilmington Blue Rocks from 2016 to 2017.

Sporting positions
Preceded by Toby Harrah	Colorado Rockies Bench Coach; 2003–2008	Succeeded by Jim Tracy
Preceded by Mark Bailey	Houston Astros Bullpen Coach; 2009–2011	Succeeded by Craig Bjornson
Preceded by Pat Listach	Chicago Cubs Bench Coach; 2012–2013	Succeeded by Brandon Hyde
