= George Riley (baseball) =

American baseball player (born 1956)

- Pitcher
- Born: October 6, 1956; Philadelphia, Pennsylvania, U.S.
- Died: January 29, 2023 (aged 66)
- Batted: Left Threw: Left

MLB debut
- September 15, 1979, for the Chicago Cubs

Last MLB appearance
- May 4, 1986, for the Montreal Expos

MLB statistics
- Win–loss record: 1–5
- Earned run average: 4.97
- Strikeouts: 40
- Stats at Baseball Reference

Teams
- Chicago Cubs (1979–1980); San Francisco Giants (1984); Montreal Expos (1986)

George Michael Riley (October 6, 1956 – January 29, 2023) was an American former professional baseball pitcher. He played parts of four seasons in the Major League Baseball (MLB), between 1979 and 1986, for the Chicago Cubs, San Francisco Giants, and Montreal Expos.

== Career ==
Riley graduated from South Philadelphia High School in Philadelphia in 1974, where in addition to baseball, he played basketball and football. While in high school. Riley was dominant, compiling and a career 18-0 record, pitching six no-hitters (including four consecutive), striking out 21 batters in a single game, and helping his school with the Philadelphia city championship.

Riley was drafted by the Cubs in the fourth round of the 1974 amateur draft and made his minor league debut that year at the age of 17. After parts of six seasons in the minors, he was called up by the Cubs in August 1979 and made his Major League debut on September 15. Over two seasons with the Cubs, Riley pitched in 26 games. He was released before spring training on 1981 and spent the next three seasons pitching in the minors for the Chicago White Sox and Philadelphia Phillies organizations.

On August 20, 1984, the Phillies traded Riley along with Kelly Downs to the Giants for Al Oliver and a player to be named later (Renie Martin). Riley pitched five games for San Francisco, including his first and only major league victory, a 4-2 win over the Los Angeles Dodgers on September 23.

Riley spent 1985 back in the minors at San Francisco's AAA affiliate. The Giants traded him along with Alonzo Powell after the season to the Expos for Bill Laskey. Riley was back in the majors with the Expos for 10 games in 1986 and then finished off his career with another season in the minors in the Phillies organization in 1987.

== Personal ==
Following his baseball career, Riley worked as an electrician. Riley died on January 29, 2023.
