= Freddy Guzmán =

Dominican baseball player (born 1981)

- Outfielder
- Born: 20 January 1981 (age 45); Santo Domingo, Dominican Republic
- Batted: Switch Threw: Right

MLB debut
- 17 August, 2004, for the San Diego Padres

Last MLB appearance
- 18 September, 2013, for the Tampa Bay Rays

MLB statistics
- Batting average: .211
- Home runs: 1
- Runs batted in: 7
- Stats at Baseball Reference

Teams
- San Diego Padres (2004); Texas Rangers (2006–2007); New York Yankees (2009); Tampa Bay Rays (2013)

Freddy Antonio Guzmán (born 20 January 1981) is a Dominican former professional baseball outfielder. He played in Major League Baseball (MLB) with the San Diego Padres, Texas Rangers, New York Yankees, and Tampa Bay Rays in five seasons between 2004 and 2013.

== Career ==
=== San Diego Padres ===
Guzmán was signed as a non-drafted free agent by the San Diego Padres on 17 April 2000. His first professional experience came in 2001, where he was limited to just 12 games with the Idaho Falls Padres due to a broken leg. He played for all three of the organization's Class-A teams in 2002, batting a combined .262 with 32 RBI and 69 stolen bases.

Before the 2003 season, Guzmán played under the name "Pedro de los Santos." It was then discovered that he had falsified his identity and was 30 months older than originally believed. That year, he led all minor leaguers in stolen bases, with 90. San Diego added him to the 40-man roster after the season.

Heading into the 2004 season, Guzmán was ranked as the third best prospect in the Padres system by Baseball America. San Diego added him to the 40-man roster He hit .289 with 26 RBI and 65 stolen bases over 101 games in Double-A and Triple-A. Guzmán made his major league debut on 17 August 2004, going 1–for-5 with a walk. He got a hit in his first six games in the majors. He missed all of the 2005 season following Tommy John surgery.

=== Texas Rangers ===
On 11 May 2006, the Padres traded Guzmán and César Rojas to the Texas Rangers for Vince Sinisi and John Hudgins. He was first called up on 20 June and appeared in eight games over two stints with the team in June and July. Guzmán also appeared in a 16 August game against the Los Angeles Angels, where he was one of two Rangers batters to be hit that night. After Texas pitcher Scott Feldman hit Adam Kennedy in retaliation, Kennedy stormed the mound and caused a brawl, resulting in several suspensions.

In 2007, Guzmán spent almost the entire season in Triple-A. He hit .269 with four home runs, 34 RBI, and 56 stolen bases in 133 games for the Oklahoma Redhawks. Guzmán hit his first MLB home run on 11 September, at Comerica Park off Detroit Tigers) pitcher Clay Rapada.

=== Detroit Tigers ===
On 5 December 2007, Guzmán was traded to the Detroit Tigers for Chris Shelton. On 27 March, just before the end of spring training, he was sent outright to the Double-A Erie in order to give the organization's younger outfielders more playing time in Triple-A. Guzmán spent the season in the minors, hitting .272 with five home runs, 60 RBI, and 71 stolen bases in 131 games for the Erie SeaWolves and Toledo Mud Hens.

=== Seattle Mariners ===
Guzmán signed a minor league contract with the Seattle Mariners and was invited to spring training before the 2009 season. He underwent surgery in early March to repair a broke hamate bone in his right hand. On 11 May, Guzmán was released by the Mariners.

=== Boston Red Sox ===
On 16 May 2009, Guzmán was signed by the Boston Red Sox and assigned to the Triple-A Pawtucket Red Sox. On 29 July, he was released by the Red Sox.

=== Baltimore Orioles ===
On 7 August, Guzmán signed a minor league contract with the Baltimore Orioles. He was assigned to the Norfolk Tides in Triple-A.

=== New York Yankees ===
On 31 August 2009, the deadline for him to be eligible to appear in the postseason, the New York Yankees acquired Guzmán for cash considerations. He was assigned to the Scranton/Wilkes-Barre Yankees and stole seven bases in seven attempts in six games. On 14 September, the Yankees promoted Guzmán to the major leagues. He was used as a defensive replacement over 10 games down the stretch.

The Yankees considered adding him to their roster for the 2009 American League Division Series, but opted to add another pitcher instead. He was included on their roster for the 2009 American League Championship Series. He was removed from the roster for the 2009 World Series.

=== Philadelphia Phillies ===
In February 2010, Guzmán signed a minor league contract with the Philadelphia Phillies. He was released on 3 April, before the start of the minor league season.

=== Acereros de Monclova ===
On 18 March 2011, Guzmán signed with Acereros de Monclova of the Mexican League. He hit .292 with four home runs, 20 RBI, and 11 stolen bases in 32 games.

=== Petroleros de Minatitlan ===
He was traded to Petroleros de Minatitlan on 26 April 2011 and released on 9 May.

=== Delfines de Ciudad del Carmen ===
On 13 March 2012, Guzmán joined Delfines de Ciudad del Carmen. He hit .289 with 56 stolen bases in 71 games that year. His 2013 was even better, hitting .326 with nine home runs, 51 RBI, and 73 stolen bases over 99 games.

=== Tampa Bay Rays ===
The Tampa Bay Rays signed Guzmán to a minor league contract on 30 August 2013. His contract was purchased by the Rays on 17 September. He appeared in one game for Tampa Bay, pinch-running for Matt Joyce in the bottom of the 11th down 3–2. Guzmán stole second, then scored the tying run on David DeJesus's RBI single to tie the game, which they won the next inning 4–3. He was outrighted off the roster on 30 October.

=== Delfines de Ciudad del Carmen (second stint) ===
Guzmán re-signed with Ciudad del Carmen for the 2014 season. He hit .340 in 12 games before his season came to an end due to injury. In 2015, Guzmán hit .269 with 47 stolen bases over 112 games.

=== Vaqueros de la Laguna ===
on 2 December 2015, Guzmán was traded to Vaqueros de la Laguna. He was released on 15 April after just 11 games.

=== Toros de Tijuana ===
On 23 April 2016, Guzmán signed with the Toros de Tijuana. He appeared in seven games and was released on 2 May.

=== Tigres de Quintana Roo ===
On 21 April 2017, Guzmán signed with the Tigres de Quintana Roo. He hit .262 with 19 stolen bases before being released on 16 June 2017.

== Coaching career ==
After retiring, Guzmán has served as the hitting coach for the Dominican Summer League Nationals since 2020.
