= Craig Bjornson =

American baseball player & coach (born 1969)

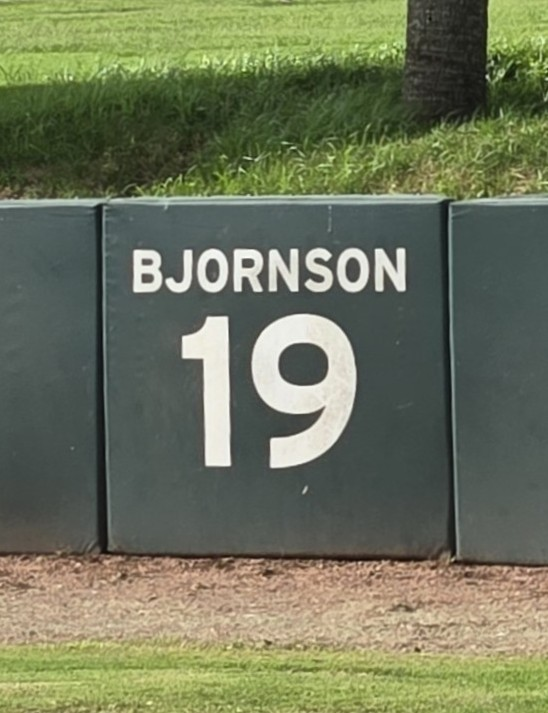
- Bjornson, Nicholls Colonels retired numbers
- Pitcher / Coach
- Born: February 14, 1969 (age 57); Tucson, Arizona, U.S.
- Bats: Left Throws: Left
- Stats at Baseball Reference

Teams
- As coach: Houston Astros (2012, 2014–2017); Boston Red Sox (2018–2020); New York Mets (2022)

Career highlights and awards
- 2× World Series champion (2017, 2018)

Craig Michael Bjornson (born February 14, 1969) is an American former professional baseball player and current coach. He was recently the bullpen coach for the New York Mets of Major League Baseball (MLB). Bjornson previously coached for the Houston Astros and Boston Red Sox.

== Career ==
Bjornson attended Tucson High School in Tucson, Arizona, and Nicholls State University, where he played college baseball for the Nicholls State Colonels baseball team. He signed as an undrafted free agent with the Houston Astros in 1991. He played in the Astros' minor league organization as a pitcher until 1993, pitching for the Gulf Coast Astros, Burlington Astros, Asheville Tourists, Auburn Astros, and Quad Cities River Bandits. In total, he had a 9-18 win–loss record with a 3.82 earned run average in 81 appearances (27 starts) with a complete game and three saves.

Bjornson served as a minor league pitching coach for the Spokane Indians in 2002 (Royals), the Vermont Lake Monsters in 2003 (Expos) and 2005 (Nationals), the Brevard County Manatees in 2004 (Expos), the Ogden Raptors in 2007 and 2008 (Dodgers), and the Casper Ghosts from 2009 through 2011 (Rockies).

From 2000 through 2003, he coached for the Occidente Pastora de los Llanos of the Venezuelan Winter League.

The Astros hired Bjornson as their bullpen coach for the 2012 season. Following the hiring of Bo Porter as manager for the 2013 season, Bjornson was reassigned as a roving pitching instructor and replaced as bullpen coach by Dennis Martínez. The Astros reinstated Bjornson as their bullpen coach for the 2014 season. Bjornson served as the bullpen coach for the Astros during the 2017 season, when they won their first World Series title.

On November 12, 2017, the Boston Red Sox hired Bjornson as their bullpen coach. In October 2020, the team declined to renew his contract.

On January 21, 2022, Bjornson was hired by New York Mets as the bullpen coach. He was let go after the season and was hired by the Atlanta Braves to be the pitching coach for the Triple-A Gwinnett Stripers.

In 2026, Bjornson rejoined the Rockies organization as a pitching coach for the Albuquerque Isotopes.

Sporting positions
Preceded by Jamie Quirk; Dennis Martínez	Houston Astros bullpen coach 2012; 2014–2017	Succeeded by Dennis Martínez; Doug White
Preceded by Dana LeVangie	Boston Red Sox bullpen coach 2018–2020	Succeeded by Kevin Walker
Preceded by Ricky Bones	New York Mets bullpen coach 2022	Succeeded by Dom Chiti
