= Rob Leary =

- Bench coach
- Born: December 3, 1963 (age 62); San Francisco, California, U.S.
- Bats: Right Throws: Right
- Stats at Baseball Reference

Teams
- As coach: Boston Red Sox (2010–2011) (staff assistant); Miami Marlins (2013–2015) (bench)

Robert James Leary III (born December 3, 1963) is an American professional baseball scout and former coach. On November 16, 2012, he was named bench coach of the Miami Marlins of Major League Baseball, on the staff of new manager Mike Redmond. He had been a coaching assistant with the 2010–2011 Boston Red Sox and an instructor, catcher and manager in minor league baseball. He was fired by the Marlins on May 17, 2015.

Leary graduated from Junipero Serra High School (San Mateo, California), where he was a teammate of Barry Bonds. He attended the College of San Mateo before graduating from Louisiana State University. A 12th-round choice of the Montreal Expos in the 1986 amateur draft, he played in the Expo farm system for five seasons (1986–90), peaking at the Triple-A level in 1990 with two games played for the Indianapolis Indians of the American Association. The 5 foot, 10 inch (1.78 m), 189-pound (86 kg), right-handed batting and -throwing catcher compiled a batting average of .225 in 694 at bats during the course of his playing career. He then managed for four seasons at the Class A level in the Montreal organization with the Rockford Expos of the Midwest League and the West Palm Beach Expos of the Florida State League before serving the Marlins (then known as the Florida Marlins) as an advance scout, roving catching instructor and field coordinator of minor league instruction from 1995 through 2001.

In 2002, Leary joined the Red Sox as the team's minor league catching instructor, and was promoted to field coordinator the following season. After seven years in that role, he joined the Boston coaching staff for the 2010 season as an assistant at the Major League level. In August 2010, Leary became Boston's acting first-base coach upon the emergency leave of Ron Johnson. He served in that role for the last two months of the season and resumed his previous job in 2011. Johnson and Leary were released at the close of the Red Sox' disappointing 2011 season. Leary then spent 2012 as the field coordinator for the Cleveland Indians. On May 17, 2015, Leary and manager Redmond were relieved of their duties for the Marlins.

As of 2017, Leary is a scout for the Arizona Diamondbacks.

Preceded by Joey Cora	Miami Marlins bench coach 2013–2015	Succeeded by Mike Goff
