= Mike Goff (baseball) =

American baseball coach (born 1962)

Arizona State Sun Devils
- Coach
- Born: September 30, 1972 (age 52)
- Bats: Right Throws: Right

Teams
- Seattle Mariners (2005–2007); Miami Marlins (2015)

Michael Roger Goff (born September 30, 1962) is an American baseball coach and former infielder, who is a current assistant baseball coach for the Arizona State Sun Devils.

Goff was a coach for the Seattle Mariners from August 2005 through 2007, serving as first base coach before being promoted to bench coach when John McLaren was named manager in June 2007. On October 5, 2007, it was announced that his contract would not be renewed; Goff had worked in the Mariners system since 1992. A former second baseman and native of Mobile, Alabama, Goff was selected by the Boston Red Sox in the 21st round (535th overall) of the June 1984 draft out of the University of Alabama at Birmingham. He played for four seasons (1984–1987) in the Boston farm system, peaking at the Double-A level. He threw and batted right-handed, and was listed at 6 feet (1.8 m) tall and 175 pounds (79 kg).

After leaving the Mariners, Goff managed in the Cincinnati Reds and San Francisco Giants organizations (2008–2011; 2013–2014). He was hired as the bench coach by the Miami Marlins on May 18, 2015.

He resides in Midlothian, Virginia, with his wife, Mary, and three children, Crystal, Katie, and Connor.

Preceded by Carlos García; Dan Rohn	Seattle Mariners first-base coach 2005–2006; 2007	Succeeded by Dan Rohn; John Moses
Preceded by Ron Hassey; John McLaren	Seattle Mariners bench coach 2006; 2007	Succeeded by John McLaren; Jim Riggleman
Preceded by Rob Leary	Miami Marlins bench coach 2015	Succeeded by Tim Wallach
