= Wilfredo Tejada =

Dominican baseball player

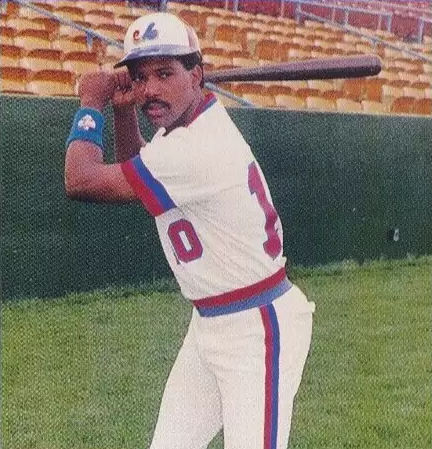
- Tejada c. 1987
- Catcher
- Born: November 12, 1962 (age 63); Santo Domingo, Dominican Republic
- Batted: Right Threw: Right

MLB debut
- September 9, 1986, for the Montreal Expos

Last MLB appearance
- October 2, 1988, for the Montreal Expos

MLB statistics
- Batting average: .250
- Home runs: 0
- Runs batted in: 4
- Stats at Baseball Reference

Teams
- Montreal Expos (1986, 1988)

Wilfredo Aristides Tejada Andujar (born November 12, 1962) is a Dominican former Major League Baseball player. Tejada played for the Montreal Expos in 1986 and 1988.
