= Dominican Summer League Nationals =

- Founded in 2005; Boca Chica

Minor league affiliations
- Class: Rookie
- League: Dominican Summer League
- Division: Boca Chica South Division

Major league affiliations
- Team: Washington Nationals

Minor league titles
- League titles (2): 2007; 2008

Team data
- Name: Nationals
- Colors: Red, white, blue
- Ballpark: Las Américas Complex
- Owner(s)/ Operator(s): Washington Nationals
- Manager: Sandy Martínez

The Dominican Summer League Nationals or DSL Nationals are a rookie-level Minor League Baseball team of the Dominican Summer League that began play in 2005. They are located in Boca Chica, Santo Domingo, Dominican Republic, and play their home games at Las Américas Complex. Two DSL Nationals squads existed between 2006 and 2008—DSL Nationals 1 and 2.

== Roster ==
Dominican Summer League Nationals roster
Players		Coaches/Other
Pitchers: 28 Enmanuel Carela; -- Jesus Carrasco; 32 Marlon De La Cruz; 30 Jose Feliz; 49 Greyson Gimenez; -- Juan Lopez; 37 Darrel Lunar; 39 Anyel Manzueta; 43 Clarence Martina; -- Jousuet Martinez; 52 Angel Pena; 53 Juan Reyes; 34 Franniel Reynoso; 38 Enyerber Rivero; 45 Jean Robles; -- Manuel Ruiz; -- Jhondel Salas; 33 Jose Sanchez; 50 Jhoan Thomas; -- Yaiker Torres; 36 Alejandro Vera	Catchers: 15 Rodrigo Garcia; 4 Feldi Tavarez; Infielders: 7 Manuel Cabrera; -- Brayan Cortesia; 25 Angel Feliz; 13 Eddy Marmolejos; 10 Angel Requena; 5 Eyeksson Rojas; Outfielders: -- Andry Araujo; 24 Victor Hurtado; 17 Hector Liriano; 16 Juan Obispo; 26 Dashyll Tejeda	Manager: -- Sandy Martinez; Coaches: -- Freddy Guzmán (hitting); -- Rafael Ozuna (hitting); -- Feliberto Sanchez (pitching); -- Niomar Gomez (assistant pitching); 7-day injured list * On Washington Nationals 40-man roster ~ Development list # Rehab assignment ∞ Reserve list ‡ Restricted list § Suspended list † Temporarily inactive list Roster updated February 25, 2025; Transactions → More rosters: MiLB • Dominican Summer League → Washington Nationals minor league players
