= Jeff Fischer (baseball) =

American baseball player (born 1963)

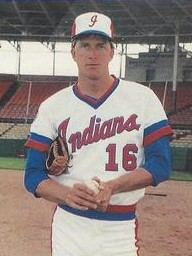
- Pitcher
- Born: August 17, 1963 (age 61); West Palm Beach, Florida, U.S.
- Batted: Right Threw: Right

MLB debut
- June 19, 1987, for the Montreal Expos

Last MLB appearance
- September 23, 1989, for the Los Angeles Dodgers

MLB statistics
- Win–loss record: 0–1
- Earned run average: 9.53
- Strikeouts: 8
- Stats at Baseball Reference

Teams
- Montreal Expos (1987); Los Angeles Dodgers (1989)

Jeffrey Thomas Fischer (born August 17, 1963) is an American former pitcher in Major League Baseball. He pitched in 6 games for the Montreal Expos and Los Angeles Dodgers in the 1987 and 1989 seasons.

Fischer was born in West Palm Beach, Florida.

Fischer graduated from the University of Florida with a bachelor's degree in telecommunications in 1986. In 1984, he played collegiate summer baseball with the Falmouth Commodores of the Cape Cod Baseball League.

== See also ==
- Florida Gators
- List of Florida Gators baseball players
