= Lance Nichols =

American baseball player (1939–2024)

Lance Lee Nichols (July 25, 1939 – March 9, 2024) was an American former catcher, manager, farm system official and scout in professional baseball. Nichols threw and batted right-handed. He stood 6 ft (1.8 m) tall and weighed 195 lb (88 kg) as an active player.

Nichols was born in Kansas City, Missouri. He attended Lyndon, Kansas, High School and played baseball, basketball and football at Emporia State University, before signing his first pro baseball contract with the Los Angeles Dodgers in 1961. He progressed as far as the Triple-A Spokane Indians of the Pacific Coast League for 77 games in 1966, but never appeared at the Major League level, batting .225 over six minor league seasons with 15 home runs.

After five seasons as the baseball coach at Dodge City High School, Nichols returned to the professional ranks as a manager in the farm systems of the Montreal Expos, St. Louis Cardinals and Baltimore Orioles, reaching the Triple-A level with the New Orleans Pelicans in 1977 and the Rochester Red Wings in 1982–1983. His record as a manager was 768–819 (.484) over 12 seasons (1972–1983).

He then served the Orioles' farm system as director of field operations before spending the 1989 season as director of player development of the Philadelphia Phillies. He also was a scout for the Colorado Rockies during their early years in MLB and a Montreal Expos and Washington Nationals scout.

He died March 9, 2024 in Dodge City, Kansas at 84 years old.
