= West Palm Beach Expos =

- 1965–1997; West Palm Beach, Florida

Minor league affiliations
- Previous classes: Class A-Advanced (1990–1997); Class A (1965–1989)
- League: Florida State League (1965–1997)

Major league affiliations
- Previous teams: Montreal Expos (1969–1997); Atlanta Braves (1965–1968)

Minor league titles
- League titles: 2 (1974, 1991)

Team data
- Previous names: West Palm Beach Expos (1969–1997); West Palm Beach Braves (1965–1968)
- Previous parks: W. Palm Beach Municipal Stadium (1969–1997)

The West Palm Beach Expos were a Florida State League minor league baseball team which existed from 1969 through the 1997 season in West Palm Beach, Florida.

== History ==
The West Palm Beach Expos were a Class A affiliate of the Montreal Expos and played their home games at West Palm Beach Municipal Stadium.

Evolving from the West Palm Beach Indians and directly from the West Palm Beach Braves (1965–1968), they were one of the longest existing Florida State League teams. In 1998, the team moved to nearby Jupiter and became today's Jupiter Hammerheads.

Baseball Hall of Fame inductees Gary Carter (1972), Vladimir Guerrero (1996–1997), Randy Johnson (1986), Tim Raines (1978) and Larry Walker (1986) played for West Palm Beach.

The 1990 Expos were recognized as one of the 100 greatest minor league teams of all time.

=== The ballpark ===
The Expos played at West Palm Beach Municipal Stadium, located at 755 Hank Aaron Drive. The stadium was the longtime spring training home of the Atlanta Braves. It was demolished in 2002 and is now the site of retail stores.

== Notable alumni ==
=== Baseball Hall of Fame alumni ===
- Gary Carter (1972) Inducted, 2003.
- Vladimir Guerrero (1996–1997) Inducted, 2018.
- Randy Johnson (1986) Inducted, 2015.
- Tim Raines (1978) Inducted, 2017.
- Larry Walker (1986) Inducted, 2020.

=== Notable alumni ===
- Felipe Alou (MGR, 1977, 1986–1991) 3× MLB All-Star; 1994 NL Manager of the Year
- Dusty Baker (1968) 2× MLB All-Star; 3× NL Manager of the Year (1993, 1997, 2000)
- Richard Barmes (1981-1986)
- Michael Barrett (1997)
- Miguel Batista (1992)
- Tony Bernazard (1975)
- Mike Blowers (1987)
- Geoff Blum (1995)
- Kent Bottenfield (1988) MLB All-Star
- Orlando Cabrera (1995, 1997)
- Ivan Calderon (1992) MLB All-Star
- Jamey Carroll (1997)
- Norm Charlton (1984–1985) MLB All-Star
- Greg Colbrunn (1989, 1993)
- Wil Cordero (1989) MLB All-Star
- Wayne Garrett (1967)
- Cito Gaston (1965) MLB All-Star; Manager: 2× World Series Champion Toronto Blue Jays (1992, 1993)
- John Wetteland (1993) MLB All-Star
- Bill Gullickson (1977–1978)
- Cliff Floyd (1992) MLB All-Star
- Barry Foote (1971)
- Andrés Galarraga (1979, 1982–1983) 5× MLB All-Star; 1993 NL Batting Title
- John Hart (1969–1970)
- Jeff Huson (1987)
- Marcel Lachemann (1974)
- Charlie Lea (1987) MLB All-Star
- Dale Murray (1971-1972)
- David Palmer (1977–1978, 1981)
- Larry Parrish (1973) 2× MLB All-Star
- Tony Phillips (1978–1979)
- Ron Reed (1965) MLB All-Star
- Shane Rawley (1975) MLB All-Star
- Alberto Reyes (1990)
- Gary Roenicke (1974)
- Mel Rojas (1988)
- Scott Sanderson (1977) MLB All-Star
- Dan Schatzeder (1976)
- Tony Scott (1970–1971)
- Bryn Smith (1987)
- Matt Stairs (1989-1990)
- Ugueth Urbina (1995–1996) 2× MLB All-Star
- Ellis Valentine (1973) MLB All-Star
- John Vander Wal (1988)
- Jose Vidro (1995) 3× MLB All-Star
- Jerry White (1971)
- Rondell White (1992, 1996) MLB All-Star
- John Wetteland (1993) 3× MLB All-Star
- Earl Williams (1967) 1971 NL Rookie of the Year
- Esteban Yan (1995)

== Year-by-year records ==
Year	Record	Finish	Manager	Playoffs / Notes
1969	56-73	10th	Ed Sadowski	Did not qualify
1970	79-50	2nd	J.W. Porter	Lost in 1st round
1971	58-81	11th	Bobby Malkmus	Did not qualify
1972	64-65	7th	Lance Nichols	Did not qualify
1973	80-58	1st	Lance Nichols	Lost League Finals
1974	79-53	2nd	Walt Hriniak	League Champs
1975	58-77	7th	Gordon Mackenzie	Did not qualify
1976	63-79	7th	Gordon Mackenzie	Did not qualify
1977	77-55	3rd	Felipe Alou	Lost in 1st round
1978	67-77	10th	Larry Bearnarth	Did not qualify
1979	79-65	4th	Larry Bearnarth	Did not qualify
1980	64-73	7th	Bob Bailey	Did not qualify
1981	65-71	7th	Bob Bailey	Did not qualify
1982	54-80	9th	Junior Miner	Did not qualify
1983	75-57	4th	Tommy Thompson	Did not qualify
1984	72-72	6th	Tommy Thompson	Did not qualify
1985	74-66	6th	Junior Miner	Did not qualify
1986	80-55	3rd	Felipe Alou	Lost League Finals
1987	75-63	5th (t)	Felipe Alou	Did not qualify
1988	71-63	7th	Felipe Alou	Lost in 2nd round
1989	74-64	7th	Felipe Alou	Did not qualify
1990	92-40	1st	Felipe Alou	Lost League Finals
1991	72-59	5th (t)	Felipe Alou	League Champs
1992	76-61	4th	Dave Jauss	Lost in 1st round
1993	69-67	8th	Rob Leary	Did not qualify
1994	71-60	3rd	Rob Leary	Lost in 1st round
1995	54-81	14th	Gomer Hodge (19-35) / Rick Sofield (35-46)	Did not qualify
1996	68-67	7th	Rick Sofield	Did not qualify
1997	69-66	6th	Doug Sisson	Did not qualify
