= Bill Moore (first baseman) =

American baseball player (born 1960)

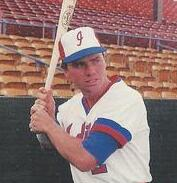
- Moore with the Indianapolis Indians c. 1987
- Outfielder
- Born: October 10, 1960 (age 65); Los Angeles, California, U.S.
- Batted: Right Threw: Left

MLB debut
- July 13, 1986, for the Montreal Expos

Last MLB appearance
- July 25, 1986, for the Montreal Expos

MLB statistics
- Batting average: .167
- Home runs: 0
- Runs batted in: 0
- Stats at Baseball Reference

Teams
- Montreal Expos (1986)

William Ross Moore (born October 10, 1960) is an American former Major League Baseball player. Moore played for the Montreal Expos in 1986.
