= Dennis Martínez =

Nicaraguan baseball player (born 1955)

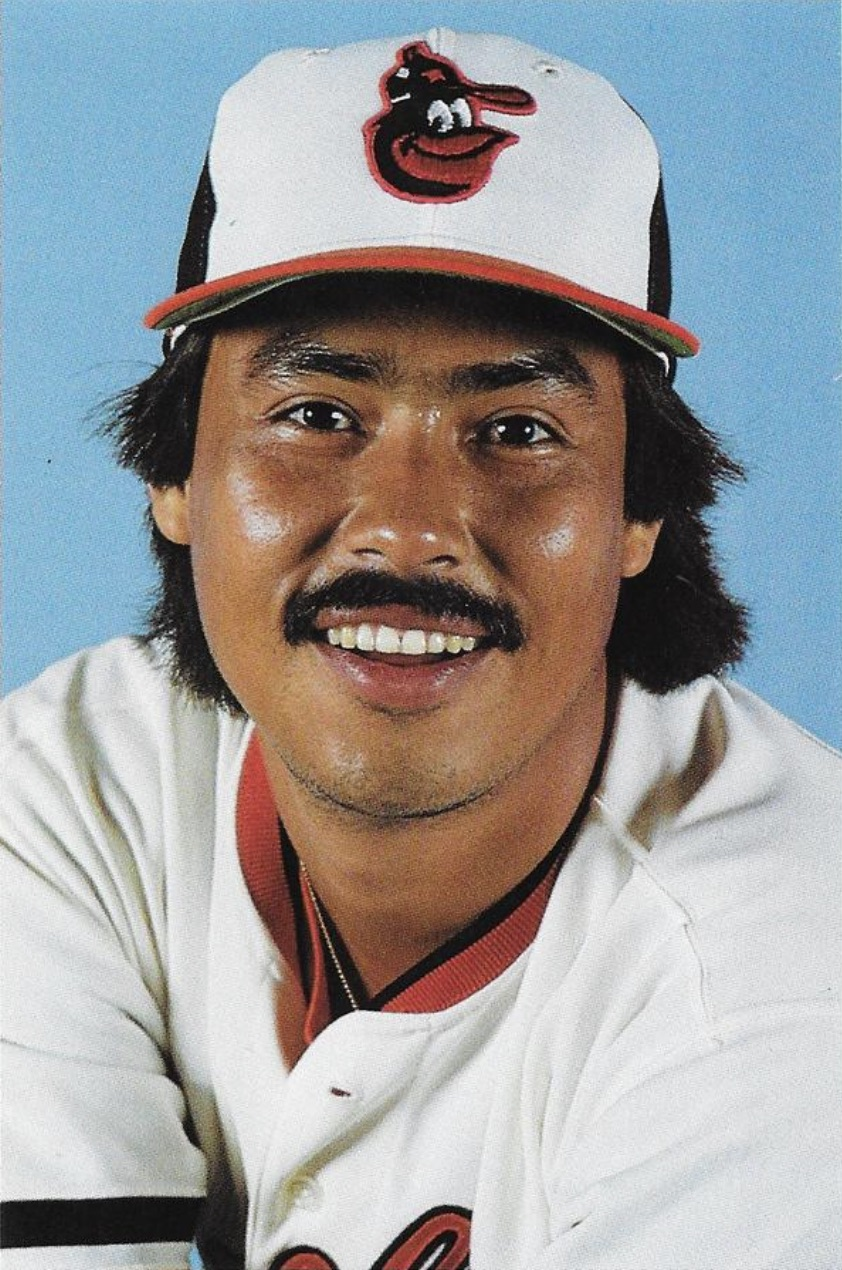
- Martínez in 1983
- Pitcher
- Born: May 14, 1955 (age 71); Granada, Nicaragua
- Batted: Right Threw: Right

MLB debut
- September 14, 1976, for the Baltimore Orioles

Last MLB appearance
- September 27, 1998, for the Atlanta Braves

MLB statistics
- Win–loss record: 245–193
- Earned run average: 3.70
- Strikeouts: 2,149
- Stats at Baseball Reference

Teams
- Baltimore Orioles (1976–1986); Montreal Expos (1986–1993); Cleveland Indians (1994–1996); Seattle Mariners (1997); Atlanta Braves (1998)

Career highlights and awards
- 4× All-Star (1990–1992, 1995); MLB wins leader (1981); MLB ERA leader (1991); Pitched a perfect game on July 28, 1991; Baltimore Orioles Hall of Fame

Member of the Canadian

Baseball Hall of Fame
- Induction: 2016
Medals
Men's baseball
Representing Nicaragua
Baseball World Cup
Silver medal – second place	1973 Managua	Team

José Dennis Martínez Ortiz (born May 14, 1955), nicknamed "El Presidente" (lit. 'The President'), is a Nicaraguan former professional baseball pitcher. Martínez played in Major League Baseball (MLB) for the Baltimore Orioles, Montreal Expos, Cleveland Indians, Seattle Mariners, and Atlanta Braves from 1976 to 1998. He threw a perfect game in 1991, and was a four-time MLB All-Star. He was the first Nicaraguan to play in the majors.

== Early life ==
Martínez was born in Granada, Nicaragua, the last of seven children to Edmundo and Emilia Martínez. The family was poor, but he helped his parents on the farm that raised food for the family. He was scouted by Ray Poitevint of the Baltimore Orioles on December 10, 1973, for $3,000 (equivalent to $21,758 in 2025). He spent three years in the minor leagues with three separate teams. He went 15–6 with the Miami Orioles in 1974 with a 2.06 earned run average (ERA). The following year, he spent time with Miami (going 12–4), Asheville (4–1), and the Rochester Red Wings (earning no decisions). He went 14–8 with the Red Wings for 1976 with a 2.50 ERA before being called up to Baltimore late in the season.

== Playing career ==
=== Baltimore Orioles (1976–1986) ===
Martínez made his debut on September 14, 1976, against the Detroit Tigers at Memorial Stadium. He replaced Dave Pagan in the top of the fourth inning with the Orioles trailing 7–5. He pitched 5 2/3 innings while allowing no runs on four hits, one walk and five strikeouts as the Orioles rallied in the seventh to win 9–7 and give Martínez his first career win. In four games pitched with the team, he went 1–2 with a 2.60 ERA in 27 2/3 innings. He had 18 strikeouts and eight walks.

The following year, Martínez went 14–7 with a 4.10 ERA in 42 games (of which he started 13) in 166 2/3 innings, with four saves and five complete games. He had 107 strikeouts and 64 walks.

For 1978, Martínez went 16–11 with a 3.52 ERA while appearing in 40 games, having 15 complete games in 276 1/3 innings of work. He had 142 strikeouts and 93 walks (a career high). He faced 1,140 batters, the first of three times in his career that he would do so. He finished in the top ten for numerous categories in the American League, such as innings pitched (6th), strikeouts (9th), walks (6th), and hits (9th with 257).

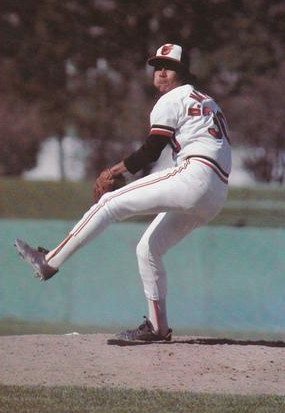
Martínez in 1977

The following year, he was at his peak of usage, appearing in 40 games with 39 starts while having 18 complete games and 292 1/3 innings of work (the latter three being career highs). He went 15–16 with a 3.66 ERA while having 132 strikeouts and 78 walks. He faced a career and league high 1,206 batters. Martínez made his postseason debut in Game 3 of the ALCS against the California Angels, pitching 8 1/3 innings, allowing three runs on eight hits, while striking out four, although he did not receive a decision in the 4–3 loss.

For the 1980 season, Martínez went 6–4 with a 3.97 ERA in 25 games. He had two complete games and one save in a total of 99 2/3 innings. He had 42 strikeouts and 44 walks. He was put into the lineup as a designated hitter on September 29, 1980, although Terry Crowley pinch-hit for him prior to batting. On the field, he had five putouts, 16 assists and one double play for a 1.000 fielding percentage.

The following year, Martínez improved. He went 14–5 with a 3.32 ERA in 25 games, having nine complete games with two shutouts in 179 innings of work. He had 88 strikeouts and 62 walks. He had 20 putouts, 44 assists, two errors, and four double plays for a .970 fielding percentage. He received votes for the Cy Young Award, finishing fifth, and the Most Valuable Player award, coming 23rd.

For the 1982 season, Martínez was selected to pitch the Opening Day game against the Kansas City Royals at Memorial Stadium on April 5, 1982. In four innings of work, he allowed four runs on six hits with two strikeouts and three walks while allowing a home run, although the Orioles rallied in the seventh to win 13–5. That year, he went 16–12 with a 4.21 ERA in 40 games. He had ten complete games in 252 innings of work, while having 111 strikeouts and 87 walks. He faced 1,093 batters, the third and last time he faced a thousand batters in a season.

The following year, he was selected for the Opening Day start once again. Facing the Royals on April 4, he allowed four runs on six hits and six innings of work, with six strikeouts and two walks as the Royals trounced the Orioles 7–2. That year, he went 7–16 with a 5.53 ERA. In 32 games and 153 innings of work, he had four complete games while having 71 strikeouts and 45 walks.

Martínez was plagued by alcoholism in the beginning of his career; he had been introduced to drinking when he was 17, with his drinking problem developing further by the time he made the majors. With the clubhouse always having beer, he drank only on road trips and not in the presence of his family. It was this problem that led Joe Altobelli to keep him off the 1983 postseason roster, although he did receive a championship ring. One night after the 1983 World Series was over, Martínez and a friend of his went drinking. On the ride home, he was cited for intoxication by a state trooper. The humiliation from the arrest, which his kids had heard about, led him to enter rehab.

Despite quitting drinking, he struggled in the seasons afterwards, going 6–9 in 1984 with a 5.02 ERA in 34 games and 141 2/3 innings with 77 strikeouts and 37 walks. Martínez stated that dedication to sobriety affected his focus on the field: "When I tried to play, it wasn’t the same. I wasn’t the same pitcher, not the same before I stopped drinking. And it’s true, you can’t concentrate on the game and on sobriety at the same time. You have to concentrate on one or the other." He had slight improvements in 1985, going 13–11 with a 5.15 ERA in 33 games and 180 innings of work. He allowed more hits and runs than the season before while having 68 strikeouts and 63 walks. On June 5, Martínez recorded his 100th win. Pitching against the California Angels at Memorial Stadium, he threw a complete game, allowing no runs on one hit, striking out three batters, walking one, and hitting one. In 1986, Martinez's struggles proved to be the end of his tenure in Baltimore. He had a 6.75 ERA in his four games with the Orioles, pitching 6 2/3 innings while having two walks and strikeouts each. On June 16, he was traded by the Orioles along with an additional player to be named later (which the Orioles did by sending John Stefero later in the year) to the Montreal Expos for a player to be named later (which the Expos did by sending Rene Gonzales). In 11 seasons in Baltimore, Martínez went 108–93 while having a 4.16 ERA in 1,775 innings with 858 strikeouts and 583 walks. He still ranks in the top ten of several categories for the Orioles, such as wins (10th), innings (9th), strikeouts (10th), walks (8th), losses (8th), and earned runs (6th). Gonzales would bat .221 in four seasons of 267 total games with the Orioles while Martínez won 100 games with the Expos.

=== Trade and Montreal Expos (1986–1993) ===
Martínez pitched in relief for his first three games before being put in as a starter in July. He lost three of his first four starts (with one no decision). Although his sluggish start did not improve with the Expos, he went 3–6 with a 4.59 ERA in 19 appearances, with a complete game and a save in 98 innings of work. He had 63 strikeouts and 28 walks.

After the season, Martínez had a contract dispute with the Expos, who offered him half ($250,000) of what he had been earning with the Orioles. He entered free agency, but no one took an offer on him, and so he re–signed with the Expos, although he couldn't sign until May 1, which he would do for the minimum. He pitched in the minor leagues to start his comeback to the team, pitching with the Miami Marlins, a Class A independent team. He later went to the Indianapolis Indians, a AAA affiliate for the Expos, going 3–2 with a 4.46 ERA, but he was called back up to the Expos in June. Martínez went 11–4 with a 3.30 ERA in 22 games, pitching 144 2/3 innings while having 84 strikeouts and 40 walks.

Martínez made the Opening Day start for the team in 1988, which was the first one in Montreal at Olympic Stadium. Facing the New York Mets on April 4, he faced off against Dwight Gooden. He pitched six innings while allowing seven runs on nine hits (three being home runs), with four walks and seven strikeouts while the Expos lost 10–6. That year, Martínez went 15–13 with a 2.72 ERA in 34 games and 235 1/3 innings of work while having nine complete games, the last two being the most for him since 1982. He had 120 strikeouts and 55 walks. He made 19 putouts, 39 assists, six errors (a league high) and three double plays for a .906 fielding percentage. He finished in the top ten of numerous categories, such as ERA (9th), innings (9th), complete games (6th), home runs (5th with 21), hits (9th with 215) along with batters faced (10th with 968), and adjusted ERA+ (8th with 133).

The following year, Martínez was the Opening Day starter for the Expos once again. Pitching against the Pittsburgh Pirates at Olympic Stadium, he threw seven innings while allowing three runs on eight hits while having three strikeouts, with the Expos rallying to win in the ninth 6–5. That season, he went 16–7 with a 3.18 ERA in 34 games and 232 innings. He had 142 strikeouts and 49 walks, the former being tied for the most in his career with his 1978 season. He made 11 putouts, 50 assists, two errors with six double plays for a .968 fielding percentage. He finished in the top ten in numerous categories of the National League, such as wins (6th), win–loss percentage (4th), walks per nine innings (3rd with 1.901), innings pitched (8th), games started (7th), home runs (6th with 21), hits (3rd with 227), and batters faced (8th with 950). During Martínez' time with the Expos, a variation of the Montreal hot dog topped with cheese and bacon called the Denny Dog was sold at Olympic Stadium.

Martínez' 1990 season was a mixed bag in certain ways. He started the year off as the Opening Day pitcher against the St. Louis Cardinals at Busch Stadium. He went five innings while allowing three runs on seven hits with five strikeouts and four walks while the Expos lost 6–5 in 11 innings. He went 10–11 with a 2.95 ERA in 32 games and 226 innings, having seven complete games. He had a career-high 156 strikeouts with 49 walks. Despite this, he was named to the All-Star Game at Wrigley Field. He had a 6–7 record at the time of his selection with a 2.84 ERA. It was his first career All–Star selection. He pitched the fourth inning for the National League. Facing the 4–5–6 order of Cal Ripken Jr., Ken Griffey Jr. and Mark McGwire, Martínez had one strikeout while allowing no hits.

For 1991, Martínez improved. For the fourth year in a row, he was the Opening Day starter, pitching against the Pittsburgh Pirates at Three Rivers Stadium. He threw seven innings of work, allowing one hit and no runs with five strikeouts and two walks, as the Expos won 7–0. It was his first and only Opening Day win with the Expos. He went 14–11 with a 2.39 ERA (a career low) in 31 games and 222 innings of work. He had nine complete games while having five shutouts, the latter being a career high. July proved to be a highlight for Martínez. He had 123 strikeouts with 62 walks while being named to the All-Star Game at SkyDome in Toronto on July 9. Martínez pitched the third and fourth innings for the NL, allowing three runs on four hits, including a home run from Cal Ripken Jr. He received the loss as the American League held on to win 4–2. Nineteen days later, on July 28, Martínez pitched the 13th perfect game in Major League Baseball history against the Los Angeles Dodgers. He was the first Latin American–born pitcher to pitch a perfect game. Martínez struck out five batters and threw 96 pitches, 66 for strikes. He finished the month of July with a 2–1 record in five games started while named NL Pitcher of the Month. He finished with the lowest ERA in the league, beating out the Cincinnati Reds' José Rijo, who finished with a 2.51 ERA. He was the first Expo since Steve Rogers in 1982 to win the ERA title.

The following year, Martínez went 16–11 with a 2.47 ERA in 32 games and 226 1/3 innings of work. He had 147 strikeouts and 60 walks while being selected for a third straight All-Star Game, this time in San Diego. Martínez entered in the top of the seventh inning. He had a strikeout and a walk while allowing no hits in his one inning of work. In August, he was named the Pitcher of the Month for the NL. In his five starts for the month, he went 4–0 while pitching at least seven innings in each start, allowing more than one earned run in just one game. He finished in the top ten for numerous categories in the league once again, such as ERA (5th), wins (3rd), walks & hits per inning (4th), and innings pitched (10th).

Martínez played his final season with the Expos in 1993. He went 15–9 with a 3.85 ERA in 35 games, having two complete games along one save in 224 2/3 innings. He struck out 138 batters while walking 64 batters. On the field, he made 17 putouts, 46 assists, one error and one double play for a .984 fielding percentage. On June 18, Martínez received his 200th win. Pitching in Montreal against the Atlanta Braves, he threw eight innings while allowing one run, four hits, and three walks with seven strikeouts as the Expos won 2–1. On September 28, Martínez won his 100th game for the Expos, doing so against the Florida Marlins at Joe Robbie Stadium. Martínez threw 7 2/3 innings while allowing two runs on four hits with six strikeouts and one walk on 105 pitches, but the Expos held on to win with John Wetteland throwing a 1.1 inning save to preserve the 3–2 win for the Expos. In August, the Expos put him on waivers. Three teams put a claim on him: the Atlanta Braves, the San Francisco Giants, and the Philadelphia Phillies, with the Braves doing so to try and stop him going to the Giants. The Expos were only willing to let him go to the Braves if they included a player that the team wanted to give up Martínez. However, he used his 10–and–5 rights privilege to veto a trade. The team finished 94–68 that year, the best record during Martínez's tenure with the club, although they finished three games back of the Philadelphia Phillies for the National League East division title. With the win, he became the seventh pitcher with at least 100 wins in both the American and National Leagues, joining Jim Bunning, Ferguson Jenkins, Al Orth, Gaylord Perry, Nolan Ryan, and Cy Young; since Martínez, Kevin Brown and Randy Johnson have joined him on the list. Martínez finished his career in the top ten of numerous categories for the franchise, such as wins (2nd behind Steve Rogers), ERA (5th being Tim Burke), innings pitched (2nd behind Rogers), and strikeouts (6th behind Rogers).

=== Cleveland Indians (1994–1996) ===
Martínez entered free agency after the 1993 Major League Baseball season ended, and he signed with the Cleveland Indians in the winter. Martínez was named the starting pitcher for the Opening Day game against the Seattle Mariners on April 4, which happened to be the first regular season game held at Jacobs Field in Cleveland. He pitched seven innings while allowing two runs on three hits with four strikeouts and walks each, with the Indians rallying to win 4–3 in ten innings. For the season, he went 11–6 with a 3.52 ERA in 24 games pitched and 176 2/3 innings. He had three shutouts, the first time he pitched a shutout in a season since 1991. He had 92 strikeouts and 44 walks. He made 11 putouts, 33 assists, two double plays and no errors for a 1.000 fielding percentage, the first time that Martínez compiled the percentage since 1980. He finished in the top ten in numerous categories, such as WAR (6th with 4.6), wins (10th), walks & hits per inning (6th with 1.189), walks per nine innings (7th with 2.242), innings pitched (4th), complete games (2nd), and home runs per nine innings (6th with 0.713). Although the season was cancelled midway through August, the Indians had won 66 games and were on track for a playoff spot.

For 1995, he kept consistent form. He started the Opening Day game for the team once again, this time allowing two runs off four hits while striking out three in six innings of work, although the Indians prevailed over the Texas Rangers 11–6. He went 12–5 with a 3.08 ERA in 28 games and 187 innings pitched. He had 99 strikeouts with 46 walks. He made 15 putouts, three double plays, 46 assists and four errors, the latter being league highs while having a .938 fielding percentage. He finished in the top ten of numerous categories, such as WAR (5th, 5.7), ERA (3rd), walks & hits per inning (3rd, 1.176), and home runs per nine innings (9th, 0.818).

On September 28, 1995, a wild pitch by Martínez broke the jaw of Hall of Famer Kirby Puckett. This would be Puckett's last official game of his career, as he retired in 1996 due to glaucoma in his right eye. Martínez pitched in five games for the Indians during their run to the American League pennant, his first postseason action since 1979 with the Orioles. He went 1–2 with two no decisions. He started Game 1 of both the ALDS and the ALCS. He earned his first postseason win in Game 6 of the ALCS, pitching seven innings while allowing four hits and no runs with three strikeouts and one walk on 90 pitches as the Indians clinched the pennant 4–0 over the Seattle Mariners. He started Game 2 and 6 of the World Series, receiving the loss in the former while having a no decision in the latter; the Braves prevailed to win the Series in six games.

The following year, in which he turned 41 (making him the oldest active pitcher in the American League at the time), he had a year plagued by inconsistency. Martínez started the Opening Day game for the team for the third straight year, the first Indians pitcher to have three consecutive Opening Day starts since Gaylord Perry in 1974. He pitched seven innings while allowing two runs on five hits to the New York Yankees, including Derek Jeter's home run in his first at-bat, with five strikeouts and two walks, as the Indians lost 7–1. He went 9–6 with a 4.50 ERA in 20 games and 122 innings. He had 48 strikeouts (his lowest since 1980) and 37 walks. He didn't make any appearances for the Indians after August 27, in which he pitched just 2/3 innings while allowing two runs.

=== Later career (1997–1998) ===
Martínez signed with the Seattle Mariners as a free agent on February 20, 1997. He appeared in nine games while going 1–5 with a 7.71 ERA in 49 innings. He struck out 17 batters and walked 29 batters before requesting his release on May 24, three days after allowing 7 runs on 7 hits with two walks in 1 2/3 innings against the Anaheim Angels in an 18–3 loss.

Martínez spent his final season in 1998 with the Atlanta Braves. He went 4–6 with a 4.45 ERA, appearing in 53 games while making five starts and having two saves within 91 innings. He had 62 strikeouts and 19 walks. He made four appearances in the postseason for the Braves, all in the NLCS against the San Diego Padres. He received the win for Game 4, getting the final out of the 6th inning in relief of Denny Neagle by having Chris Gomez ground out before the Braves scored in the next inning. His final appearance was in Game 6 on October 14, replacing John Rocker in the top of the 6th inning. He retired all four batters he faced, although the Braves lost the game 5–0 along with the series.

After the season, Martínez retired, stating that there was nothing more to do with his career. He retired having the most wins by a Latin American pitcher, holding that record until Bartolo Colón surpassed him in 2018.

During a 23-year baseball career, Martínez compiled 245 wins, 2,149 strikeouts, and a 3.70 earned run average. He is one of the top Latin American pitchers of all time. Martínez is one of only 17 pitchers in MLB history to start on Opening Day more than 10 times, having done it 11 times. Martínez has the most career victories of any pitcher who has never won 20 games in a single season; Mark Buehrle, Milt Pappas, Jerry Reuss, Frank Tanana, Charlie Hough, Chuck Finley, Kenny Rogers, and Tim Wakefield are the only other pitchers with at least 200 career victories who have done so. Four of these pitchers (Buehrle, Pappas, Reuss and Rogers) had pitched no-hitters, with Buehrle also pitching a perfect game, and Rogers' also being a perfect game, three years to the day of Martínez's.

== Post-playing career ==
In 2002, he was inducted into the Baltimore Orioles Hall of Fame. Martínez has worked as a spring training instructor for the Baltimore Orioles in 2005 and 2006, and pitching coach for the Palm Beach Cardinals in the Florida State League.

On November 5, 2012, the Houston Astros finalized their coaching staff for the 2013 season, naming Martínez as their new bullpen coach. He was fired from the role on October 1, 2013. Martínez was the manager of the Nicaragua national baseball team at the 2013 World Baseball Classic Qualifying Tournament. Nicaragua lost both of its games to Colombia and Panama.

The national baseball park in Managua (Nicaragua's capital city), Dennis Martínez National Stadium, was named in his honor in 1998. However, Martínez's criticism of the dictatorship of Daniel Ortega saw the government change the stadium's name in 2022. In 2016, Martínez was inducted into the Canadian Baseball Hall of Fame. Martínez was selected as the manager of the National League Futures Team as part of the 2019 All-Star Game. Martínez runs his own organization, the Dennis Martínez Foundation, to help poor children around the world.

== Highlights ==
- Four-time All-Star (1990–1992, 1995)
- Twice in top 10 for Cy Young Award voting (1981, 1991)
- Led American League (AL) in wins (1981)
- Led National League (NL) in ERA (1991)
- Led NL in shutouts (1991)
- Six times in top 10 in shutouts (1979, 1981, 1990, 1994–1996)
- Led AL in games started, innings pitched and batters faced (1979)
- Nine times pitched at least 220 innings in a season (1978–1979, 1982, 1988–1993)
- Three-time oldest player in the majors (1996–1998)
- 74th on the all-time MLB strikeouts list, as of end of 2025 season
- Set record for most wins by a Latin American pitcher, with 244 on August 9, 1998
- Pitched 13th perfect game in MLB history (July 28, 1991) with the Montreal Expos.

== See also ==
- Pitchers who have thrown a perfect game
- List of players from Nicaragua in Major League Baseball
- List of Major League Baseball career wins leaders
- List of Major League Baseball annual ERA leaders
- List of Montreal Expos Opening Day starting pitchers
- List of Major League Baseball career hit batsmen leaders
- List of Major League Baseball career strikeout leaders

Awards and achievements
Preceded by Tom Browning	Perfect game pitcher July 28, 1991	Succeeded by Kenny Rogers
Preceded by Bob Milacki, Mike Flanagan, Mark Williamson, & Gregg Olson	No-hitter pitcher July 28, 1991 (perfect game)	Succeeded by Wilson Álvarez
Preceded by Rick Honeycutt	Oldest Player in the National League; 1998	Succeeded by Gary Gaetti
Sporting positions
Preceded by Craig Bjornson	Houston Astros bullpen coach 2013	Succeeded by Craig Bjornson
