= Mike Fitzgerald (catcher) =

American baseball player (born 1960)

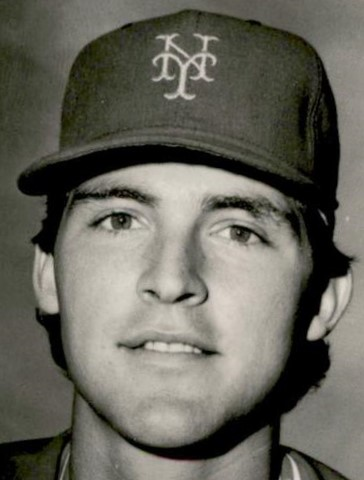
- Catcher
- Born: July 13, 1960 (age 66); Long Beach, California, U.S.
- Batted: Right Threw: Right

MLB debut
- September 13, 1983, for the New York Mets

Last MLB appearance
- October 4, 1992, for the California Angels

MLB statistics
- Batting average: .235
- Home runs: 48
- Runs batted in: 293
- Stats at Baseball Reference

Teams
- New York Mets (1983–1984); Montreal Expos (1985–1991); California Angels (1992)

Michael Roy Fitzgerald (born July 13, 1960) is an American former professional baseball player. He played as a catcher in Major League Baseball from 1983 through 1992 for the New York Mets, Montreal Expos and California Angels.

== Major League career ==
Fitzgerald was selected by the New York Mets in the 6th round of the 1978 Major League Baseball draft. He made his major league debut with the New York Mets on September 13, 1983. Fitzgerald hit a home run in his first major league at bat, becoming the 57th player in major league history to accomplish the feat. In 1984, he led National League catchers in range factor and fielding percentage, becoming only the fourth catcher in major league history to win a fielding title in his rookie year. Fitzgerald was selected as the catcher for the 1984 Baseball Digest Rookie All-Star team, and for the 1984 Topps All-Star Rookie Roster.

On December 14, 1984, the New York Mets traded Fitzgerald along with Hubie Brooks, Herm Winningham and minor league pitcher Floyd Youmans to the Montreal Expos for catcher Gary Carter. He became the Expos' starting catcher, posting his best offensive year in its 1986 season with a .282 batting average, six home runs and 37 runs batted in. In October 1991, the Expos granted Fitzgerald free agency; he signed to play for the California Angels in their 1992 season. After one year as the Angels' starting catcher, he retired as a player.

== Career statistics ==
In a ten-year major league career, Fitzgerald played in 848 games, accumulating 545 hits in 2316 at bats for a .235 career batting average along with 48 home runs and 293 runs batted in. He ended his catching career with a .988 fielding percentage.

== See also ==
- List of Major League Baseball players with a home run in their first major league at bat
