= Ubaldo Heredia =

Venezuelan baseball player

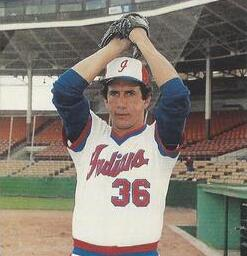
- Heredia with the Indianapolis Indians c. 1987
- Pitcher
- Born: May 4, 1956 (age 70); Ciudad Bolívar, Venezuela
- Batted: Right Threw: Right

MLB debut
- May 12, 1987, for the Montreal Expos

Last MLB appearance
- May 17, 1987, for the Montreal Expos

MLB statistics
- Win–loss record: 0–1
- Earned run average: 5.40
- Strikeouts: 6
- Stats at Baseball Reference

Teams
- Montreal Expos (1987)

Member of the Caribbean

Baseball Hall of Fame
- Induction: 2008

Ubaldo José Heredia Martínez (born May 4, 1956) is a Venezuelan former Major League Baseball right-handed starting pitcher.

== Career ==
He played for the Montreal Expos in 1987.

Heredia compiled a 0–1 record with six strikeouts and a 5.40 of ERA in 10 innings.

After his professional playing career, Heredia worked as a scout for the Seattle Mariners where he helped sign Erasmo Ramírez and others.

== See also ==
- List of players from Venezuela in Major League Baseball
