= Tom Romano =

American baseball player

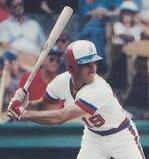
- Romano with the Indianapolis Indians c. 1987
- Outfielder
- Born: October 25, 1958 (age 67); Syracuse, New York, United States
- Batted: Right Threw: Right

MLB debut
- September 1, 1987, for the Montreal Expos

Last MLB appearance
- October 2, 1987, for the Montreal Expos

MLB statistics
- Games played: 7
- Batting average: .000
- Runs scored: 1
- Stats at Baseball Reference

Teams
- Montreal Expos (1987)

Thomas Michael Romano (born October 25, 1958) is an American former Major League Baseball player.

Romano attended Henninger High School in Syracuse, New York. He did not play high school baseball for Henninger but instead represented the school in gymnastics while playing American Legion baseball. He enrolled at Coastal Carolina University after high school at the suggestion of a friend and there played for the Chanticleers baseball team.

With the Madison Muskies in 1982, Romano hit .340 with 32 doubles, 26 home runs, and 66 stolen bases; he was named Midwest League Most Valuable Player. He was a favorite of the fans, who referred to him as the "Big Cheese." In 1983 Romano hit 24 home runs with a .320 average and 89 RBIs for the Albany-Colonie A's, the AA affiliate of the Oakland Athletics. An outfielder, Romano appeared in 7 games for the Montreal Expos in 1987, going hitless in 3 at bats but scoring a run as a pinch runner.
