= J. R. Miner =

American baseball coach and manager (Wilbert Miner; 1926–1990)

Wilbert "J. R." Miner, sometimes known as Junior Miner (April 4, 1926 – August 21, 1990), was a coach and manager in North American minor league baseball.

Born in Moundsville, West Virginia, Miner attended Bethany College. A third baseman in amateur baseball, he never played professionally. He threw and batted right-handed, stood 5 ft 11 in (1.80 m) tall and weighed 185 pounds (84 kg).

His professional coaching career began in the New York Mets organization, where he served as a coach with minor league clubs from 1970 to 1973. After spending 1974 coaching in the farm system of the New York Yankees, he joined the Baltimore Orioles as a coach with their Miami Orioles farm club (1975–77), then as manager of the Bluefield Orioles of the Rookie-level Appalachian League (1978–79). He then spent eight seasons with the Montreal Expos farm system, as a coach with the West Palm Beach Expos (1980) and then as manager of the team's Calgary Expos, Gastonia Expos, West Palm Beach Expos and Burlington Expos farm clubs (1981–87). His teams won 547 of 1,112 games (.492) with one championship (1983, in the South Atlantic League).

== Bibliography ==
- Howe News Bureau, Montreal Expos 1985 Organization Book. St. Petersburg, Florida: The Baseball Library, 1985.
- Johnson, Lloyd, and Wolff, Miles, eds., The Minor League Encyclopedia, 3rd edition. Durham, North Carolina: Baseball America, 2007.
