= John Stefero =

American baseball player (born 1959)

- Catcher
- Born: September 22, 1959 (age 65); Sumter, South Carolina, U.S.
- Batted: Left Threw: Right

MLB debut
- June 24, 1983, for the Baltimore Orioles

Last MLB appearance
- May 24, 1987, for the Montreal Expos

MLB statistics
- Batting average: .235
- Home runs: 3
- Runs batted in: 20
- Stats at Baseball Reference

Teams
- Baltimore Orioles (1983, 1986); Montreal Expos (1987)

John Robert Stefero (born September 22, 1959) is an American former Major League Baseball catcher. He played parts of three seasons in the majors between 1983 and 1987 for the Baltimore Orioles and the Montreal Expos. His listed height is 5'8" tall, and attended Motlow State Community College in Tullahoma, Tennessee.

John Stefero's major league career included just 79 games in three seasons. The catcher hit three home runs in his career and drove in a total of 20 runs.

Stefero helped to cap an Oriole comeback on September 18, 1983. Eddie Murray hit a grand slam off Pete Ladd in a six-run eighth inning. The Orioles had been trailing 7-0. The Orioles won the game when Stefero connected on a single in the ninth inning.

Stefero has worked at Safford Brown Automotive Group in Glen Burnie, Maryland since his retirement as an active player in 1990. He is currently its President/General Manager.

== Sources ==
- Career statistics from Baseball Reference, or Baseball Reference (Minors)
