= Tommy Thompson (baseball, born 1947) =

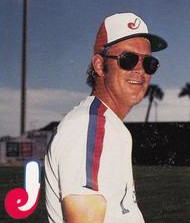
Thompson in 1988

Thomas Norman Thompson (May 22, 1947 - September 30, 2019) was an American infielder and manager in minor league baseball. As a player, he stood 6 ft 1 in (1.85 m) tall and weighed 160 pounds (73 kg). He threw and batted right-handed.

He was born in Upland, California.

Thompson graduated from Chaffey Union High School and attended Chaffey College and the University of Kansas. He then played eight seasons (1967–1974) as a shortstop, third baseman and second baseman in the farm system of the St. Louis Cardinals, spending one season, 1973, at the Triple-A level, where he batted only .220 for the Tulsa Oilers.

Thompson was an infield instructor in the St. Louis organization before beginning his managerial career on June 14, 1977, taking over for Buzzy Keller as skipper of the Cardinals' Arkansas Travelers Double-A affiliate. Thompson rallied the below-.500 Travelers to the second-half Texas League championship, then won the TL playoffs. He managed for the next 17 full seasons (1978–1994) in minor league baseball, working for the Cardinals, Montreal Expos and Texas Rangers, and winning two additional league championships. He managed at the Triple-A level for the Springfield Redbirds and Oklahoma City 89ers. All told, his record as a manager was 1,258 victories and 1,172 losses (.518).

As a scout for the Florida Marlins, Thompson played a key role in the Marlins' selection of All-Star second baseman Dan Uggla from the Arizona Diamondbacks in the 2005 Rule 5 draft.

He spent the last years of his career as the Miami Marlins' Senior Adviser for Player Development. Thompson died of natural causes on Sept. 30, 2019 in Rancho Santa Margarita, CA at the age of 72.
