= Alonzo Powell =

American baseball player and coach (born 1964)

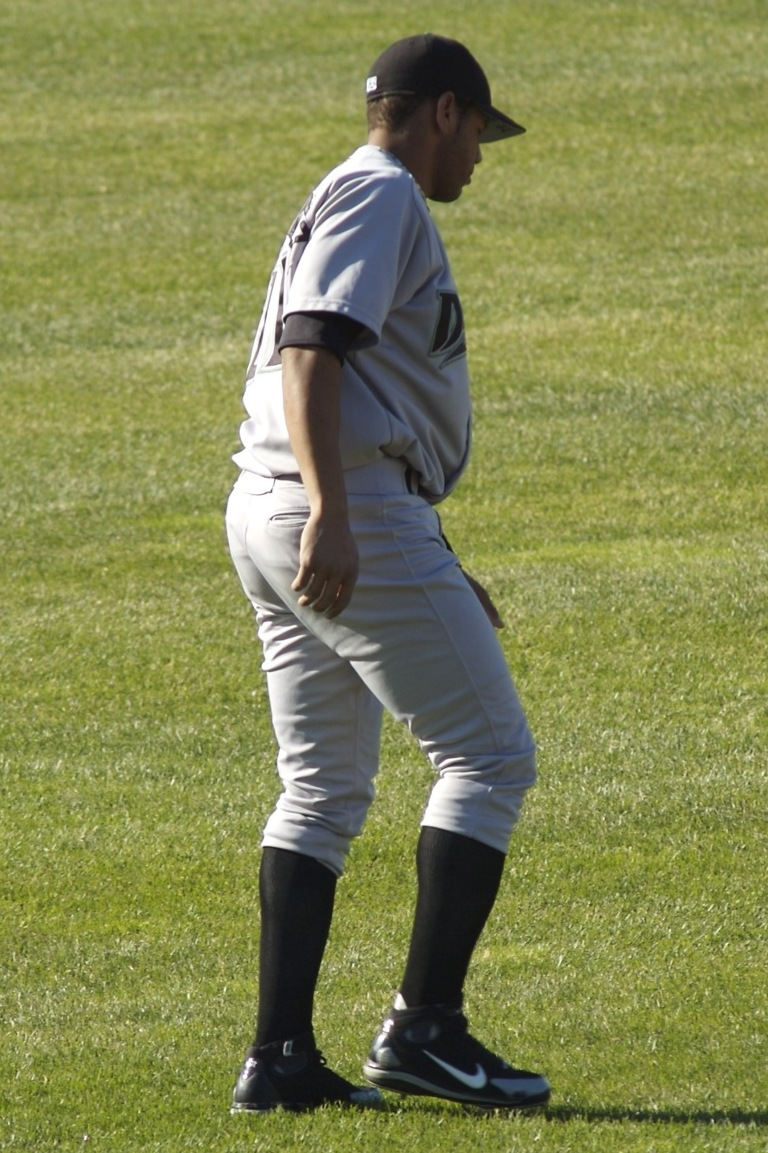
- Powell in 2006
- Outfielder / Coach
- Born: December 12, 1964 (age 61); San Francisco, California, U.S.
- Batted: Right Threw: Right

Professional debut
- MLB: April 6, 1987, for the Montreal Expos
- NPB: May 23, 1992, for the Chunichi Dragons

Last appearance
- MLB: October 6, 1991, for the Seattle Mariners
- NPB: August 9, 1998, for the Hanshin Tigers

MLB statistics
- Batting average: .211
- Home runs: 3
- Runs batted in: 16

NPB statistics
- Batting average: .313
- Home runs: 116
- Runs batted in: 397
- Stats at Baseball Reference

Teams
- As player: Montreal Expos (1987); Seattle Mariners (1991); Chunichi Dragons (1992–1997); Hanshin Tigers (1998); As coach: Seattle Mariners (2010); San Diego Padres (2012–2015); Houston Astros (2016–2017); San Francisco Giants (2018–2019); Chunichi Dragons (2020–2021)

Career highlights and awards
- 3× Central League batting champion; 2× Central League All-Star; World Series champion (2017)

Alonzo Sidney Powell (born December 12, 1964) is an American former professional baseball outfielder and current coach. He played in Major League Baseball (MLB) for the Montreal Expos and Seattle Mariners. He is currently the hitting coach of the Salt Lake Bees.

Powell was the first foreign player in Nippon Professional Baseball (NPB) to capture 3 consecutive batting titles.

== Professional career ==
=== Major League Baseball ===
Powell was signed as an undrafted free agent by the San Francisco Giants in February 1983. He made his major league debut on April 6, 1987, with the Montreal Expos. In 1987, Powell played 14 games, had 8 hits and 4 RBI. In 1991, he played for the Seattle Mariners. He had 24 hits in 111 at-bats (a .216 batting average), 3 home runs, and 12 RBI.

=== Nippon Professional Baseball ===
On May 4, 1992, Powell's contract was purchased by the Chunichi Dragons from the Seattle Mariners. Powell played for seven seasons in Japan. He was just the third player in Central League history, and the first foreign player, to win three straight batting titles, hitting .324, .355, and .340 from 1994 to 1996. Four times NPB Japanese Baseball Best Nine center-fielder 1993 to 1996. He was also a two-time Central League All-Star.

== Coaching career ==
Powell served as the hitting coach of the Double-A Chattanooga Lookouts from 2002-2003 and the manager of the Single-A Dayton Dragons from 2004-2005. In 2006, he was the Seattle Mariners minor league hitting instructor. For 2007, he was named the hitting coach for the Triple-A Tacoma Rainiers in the Mariners' organization.

On May 9, 2010, the Seattle Mariners announced that Powell would serve as the team's hitting coach, replacing Alan Cockrell. Powell then was hired as the Assistant Hitting Coach for the San Diego Padres on November 17, 2011.

On December 7, 2015, the Houston Astros named Powell as the team's new hitting coach. On November 2, 2017, he accepted the position of hitting coach for the San Francisco Giants.

On November 18, 2019, it was announced that Powell had become part of former teammate, Tsuyoshi Yoda's backroom staff at the Chunichi Dragons.

On February 16, 2024, Powell was named hitting coach of the Salt Lake Bees which is the Los Angeles Angels Triple-A affiliate.

== Personal life ==
Powell underwent surgery for prostate cancer in January 2018. He later spoke about cancer in Napa.
