= 1988 Cincinnati Reds season =

1988 Cincinnati Reds
- League: National League
- Division: West
- Ballpark: Riverfront Stadium
- City: Cincinnati
- Record: 87–74 (.540)
- Divisional place: 2nd
- Owners: Marge Schott
- General managers: Murray Cook
- Managers: Pete Rose
- Television: WLWT (Jay Randolph, Johnny Bench)
- Radio: WLW (Marty Brennaman, Joe Nuxhall)

The 1988 Cincinnati Reds season was the 119th season for the franchise in Major League Baseball, and their 19th and 18th full season at Riverfront Stadium. It marked the last of four consecutive winning seasons for the Reds, all of which resulted in second place finishes in the National League West. Led by manager Pete Rose, the Reds finished with the best record of these four seasons at 87 wins and 74 losses, but finished seven games back of the eventual World Series champion Los Angeles Dodgers. The 1988 season would be Pete Rose's last full season as Reds's manager.

== Offseason ==
- November 6, 1987: Danny Jackson was acquired from the Kansas City Royals along with Angel Salazar for Ted Power and Kurt Stillwell.
- December 8, 1987: Dave Parker was traded by the Reds to the Oakland Athletics for José Rijo and Tim Birtsas.

== Regular season ==
Danny Jackson became the last pitcher to win at least 20 games in one season for the Reds in the 20th Century. The 1988 season also marked the final season for the shortstop, Dave Concepción, an integral member of the Big Red Machine of the 1970s in which he played the last of 19 years with the club.

=== Suspension of Pete Rose ===
The stage was set in a dramatic end of a home game on April 30 against the New York Mets, in which the score was tied 5–5 leading into the ninth inning. The game had been contentious throughout, with two hit batsman and a bench-clearing brawl in the seventh inning that resulted in the ejections of both Tom Browning and Darryl Strawberry. With the Mets batting with two outs in the top of the ninth, Mookie Wilson hit a ground ball to shortstop Barry Larkin, whose throw to first base was wide and pulled first baseman Nick Esasky's foot from the bag. First-base umpire Dave Pallone, who'd long been seen as unfair by the Reds, hesitated before making a delayed safe call. Esasky, waiting for the call, failed to make a throw to the plate on Howard Johnson's attempt to score from second base. Johnson's bold baserunning proved to be the difference and stood as the game-winning run for the Mets. A furious Pete Rose rushed from the dugout, vehemently arguing the call. Rose later claimed that Pallone hit him in the cheek with his finger, prompting Rose to shove Pallone twice with his shoulder and forearm knocking him backward. Rose was then ejected and had to be restrained by his own coaches. At the same time, fans in the stadium began showering the field with debris, at which time Pallone left the field with the players retreating to the dugouts.

After a nearly 15-minute suspension of play, the game was resumed with the remaining three umpires. National League president A. Bartlett Giamatti suspended Rose for thirty days, which was the longest suspension ever levied for an on-field incident involving a manager. Rose was also fined. In addition, Reds radio announcers Marty Brennaman and Joe Nuxhall were criticized for inciting the fan response with what were characterized by "inflammatory and completely irresponsible remarks". At the time, especially given Brennaman's and Nuxhall's iconic status in Cincinnati, it was common for spectators at ballparks to listen to their teams' radio broadcasts using portable radios.

=== Season standings ===
NL West
Team	W	L	Pct.	GB	Home	Road
Los Angeles Dodgers	94	67	.584	—	45‍–‍36	49‍–‍31
Cincinnati Reds	87	74	.540	7	45‍–‍35	42‍–‍39
San Diego Padres	83	78	.516	11	47‍–‍34	36‍–‍44
San Francisco Giants	83	79	.512	11½	45‍–‍36	38‍–‍43
Houston Astros	82	80	.506	12½	44‍–‍37	38‍–‍43
Atlanta Braves	54	106	.338	39½	28‍–‍51	26‍–‍55

=== Record vs. opponents ===
1988 National League record Sources:
Team	ATL	CHC	CIN	HOU	LAD	MON	NYM	PHI	PIT	SD	SF	STL
Atlanta	—	5–7	5–13	5–13	4–14	4–8	4–8	6–6	5–5	8–10	5–13	3–9
Chicago	7–5	—	6–6	7–5	4–8–1	9–9	9–9	8–10	7–11	8–4	5–7	7–11
Cincinnati	13–5	6–6	—	9–9	7–11	5–7	4–7	9–3	7–5	10–8	11–7	6–6
Houston	13–5	5–7	9–9	—	9–9	6–6	5–7	8–4	8–4	6–12	7–11	6–6
Los Angeles	14–4	8–4–1	11–7	9–9	—	8–4	1–10	11–1	6–6	7–11	12–6	7–5
Montreal	8–4	9–9	7–5	6–6	4–8	—	6–12	9–9–1	8–10	4–8	7–5	13–5
New York	8–4	9–9	7–4	7–5	10–1	12–6	—	10–8	12–6	7–5	4–8	14–4
Philadelphia	6-6	10–8	3–9	4–8	1–11	9–9–1	8–10	—	7–11	4–7	7–5	6–12
Pittsburgh	5–5	11–7	5–7	4–8	6–6	10–8	6–12	11–7	—	8–4	8–4	11–7
San Diego	10–8	4–8	8–10	12–6	11–7	8–4	5–7	7–4	4–8	—	8–10	6–6
San Francisco	13–5	7–5	7–11	11–7	6–12	5–7	8–4	5–7	4–8	10–8	—	7–5
St. Louis	9–3	11–7	6–6	6–6	5–7	5–13	4–14	12–6	7–11	6–6	5–7	—

=== Notable transactions ===
- March 29, 1988: Guy Hoffman was released by the Reds.
- May 14, 1988: Skeeter Barnes was signed as a free agent by the Reds.
- June 1, 1988: Paul Byrd was drafted by the Reds in the 13th round of the 1988 Major League Baseball draft, but did not sign.
- June 20, 1988: Mario Soto was released by the Reds.
- July 11, 1988: Max Venable was signed as a free agent by the Reds.
- July 13, 1988: Tracy Jones and Pat Pacillo were traded by the Reds to the Montreal Expos for Jeff Reed, Herm Winningham, and Randy St. Claire.
- August 2, 1988: Ken Griffey, Sr. was signed as a free agent by the Reds.

=== Roster ===
1988 Cincinnati Reds
Roster
Pitchers: 40 Jack Armstrong; 48 Tim Birtsas; 38 Keith Brown; 32 Tom Browning; 37 Norm Charlton; 49 Rob Dibble; 31 John Franco; 43 Jeff Gray; 20 Danny Jackson; 46 Rob Murphy; 35 Pat Pacillo; 38 Pat Perry; 45 Dennis Rasmussen; 27 José Rijo; 33 Ron Robinson; 45 Candy Sierra; 36 Mario Soto; 35 Randy St. Claire; 47 Frank Williams	Catchers: 6 Bo Díaz; 30 Lloyd McClendon; 8 Terry McGriff; 34 Jeff Reed; Infielders: 25 Buddy Bell; 51 Marty Brown; 13 Dave Concepción; 10 Leon Durham; 12 Nick Esasky; 25 Ken Griffey; 56 Lenny Harris; 11 Barry Larkin; 16 Ron Oester; 9 Luis Quiñones; 17 Chris Sabo; 15 Jeff Treadway	Outfielders: 22 Dave Collins; 28 Kal Daniels; 44 Eric Davis; 26 Leo Garcia; 29 Tracy Jones; 9 Eddie Milner; 21 Paul O'Neill; 39 Ron Roenicke; 57 Van Snyder; 29 Herm Winningham	Manager: 14 Pete Rose; Coaches: 2 Scott Breeden; 19 Tommy Helms; 4 Bruce Kimm; 23 Lee May; 24 Tony Pérez

=== All-Star Game ===
The 1988 Major League Baseball All-Star Game was the 59th playing of the midsummer classic between the all-stars of the American League (AL) and National League (NL), the two leagues comprising Major League Baseball. The game was held on July 12, 1988, at Riverfront Stadium in Cincinnati, the home of the Cincinnati Reds of the National League. The game resulted in the American League defeating the National League 2-1.

=== The Perfect Game ===
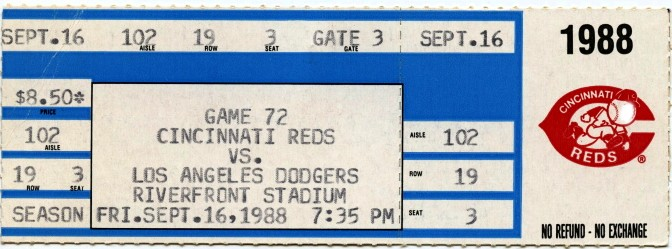
A ticket from Browning's perfect game.

Tom Browning pitched a perfect game on September 16, 1988 against the Los Angeles Dodgers.

==== Scorecard ====
September 16, 1988, Riverfront Stadium, Cincinnati, Ohio

Team	1	2	3	4	5	6	7	8	9	R	H	E
Los Angeles	0	0	0	0	0	0	0	0	0	0	0	1
Cincinnati	0	0	0	0	0	1	0	0	X	1	3	0
W: Tom Browning (16-5) L: Tim Belcher (10-5)
Attendance: 16,591, Time: 1:51

==== Batting ====
Los Angeles Dodgers	AB	R	H	RBI	Cincinnati Reds	AB	R	H	RBI
Griffin, ss	3	0	0	0	Larkin, ss	3	1	1	0
Hatcher, 1b	3	0	0	0	Sabo, 3b	3	0	1	0
Gibson, lf	3	0	0	0	Daniels, lf	3	0	0	0
Gonzalez, lf	0	0	0	0	Davis, cf	2	0	0	0
Marshall, rf	3	0	0	0	O'Neill, rf	3	0	0	0
Shelby, cf	3	0	0	0	Esasky, 1b	3	0	0	0
Hamilton, 3b	3	0	0	0	Reed, c	3	0	0	0
Dempsey, c	3	0	0	0	Oester, 2b	3	0	1	0
Sax, 2b	3	0	0	0	Browning, p	3	0	0	0
Belcher, p	2	0	0	0	None	0	0	0	0
Woodson, ph	1	0	0	0	None	0	0	0	0
Totals	27	0	0	0	Totals	26	1	3	0

==== Pitching ====
Los Angeles Dodgers	IP	H	R	ER	BB	SO	Cincinnati Reds	IP	H	R	ER	BB	SO
Belcher, L (10-5)	8.0	3	1	0	1	7	Browning, W (16-5)	9.0	0	0	0	0	7

== Player stats ==
= Indicates team leader

=== Batting ===
==== Starters by position ====
Note: Pos = Position; G = Games played; AB = At bats; H = Hits; Avg. = Batting average; HR = Home runs; RBI = Runs batted in

Pos	Player	G	AB	H	Avg.	HR	RBI
C	Bo Díaz	92	315	69	.219	10	35
1B	Nick Esasky	122	391	95	.243	15	62
2B	Jeff Treadway	103	301	76	.252	2	23
SS	Barry Larkin	151	588	174	.296	12	56
3B	Chris Sabo	137	538	146	.271	11	44
LF	Kal Daniels	140	495	144	.291	18	64
CF	Eric Davis	135	472	129	.273	26	93
RF	Paul O'Neill	145	485	122	.252	16	73

==== Other batters ====
Note: G = Games played; AB = At bats; H = Hits; Avg. = Batting average; HR = Home runs; RBI = Runs batted in

Player	G	AB	H	Avg.	HR	RBI
Dave Concepción	84	197	39	.198	0	8
Dave Collins	99	174	41	.236	0	14
Ron Oester	54	150	42	.280	0	10
Jeff Reed	49	142	33	.232	1	7
Lloyd McClendon	72	137	30	.219	3	14
Herm Winningham	53	113	26	.230	0	15
Terry McGriff	35	96	19	.198	1	4
Tracy Jones	37	83	19	.229	1	9
Buddy Bell	21	54	10	.185	0	3
Luis Quiñones	23	52	12	.231	1	11
Leon Durham	21	51	11	.216	1	2
Eddie Milner	23	51	9	.176	0	2
Ken Griffey Sr.	25	50	14	.280	2	4
Lenny Harris	16	43	16	.372	0	8
Ron Roenicke	14	37	5	.135	0	5
Leo García	23	28	4	.143	0	0
Van Snider	11	28	6	.214	1	6
Marty Brown	10	16	3	.188	0	2

=== Pitching ===
= Indicates league leader

==== Starting pitchers ====
Note: G = Games pitched; IP = Innings pitched; W = Wins; L = Losses; ERA = Earned run average; SO = Strikeouts

Player	G	IP	W	L	ERA	SO
Danny Jackson	35	261.0	23*	8	2.73	161
Tom Browning	36	250.2	18	5	3.41	124
Mario Soto	14	87.0	3	7	4.66	34
Ron Robinson	17	78.2	3	7	4.12	38
Jack Armstrong	14	65.1	4	7	5.79	45
Norm Charlton	10	61.1	4	5	3.96	39
Dennis Rasmussen	11	56.1	2	6	5.75	27

- Tied with Orel Hershiser (LAD) for league lead

==== Other pitchers ====
Note: G = Games pitched; IP = Innings pitched; W = Wins; L = Losses; ERA = Earned run average; SO = Strikeouts

Player	G	IP	W	L	ERA	SO
José Rijo	49	162.0	13	8	2.39	160
Keith Brown	4	16.1	2	1	2.76	6

==== Relief pitchers ====
Note: G = Games pitched; W = Wins; L = Losses; SV = Saves; ERA = Earned run average; SO = Strikeouts

Player	G	W	L	SV	ERA	SO
John Franco	70	6	6	39	1.57	46
Rob Murphy	76	0	6	3	3.08	74
Frank Williams	60	3	2	1	2.59	43
Rob Dibble	37	1	1	0	1.82	59
Tim Birtsas	36	1	3	0	4.20	38
Pat Perry	12	2	2	0	5.66	11
Randy St. Claire	10	1	0	0	2.63	8
Pat Pacillo	6	1	0	0	5.06	11
Jeff Gray	5	0	0	0	3.86	5
Candy Sierra	1	0	0	0	4.50	4
Dave Concepción	1	0	0	0	0.00	1

== Farm system ==
Level	Team	League	Manager
AAA	Nashville Sounds	American Association	Jack Lind, Wayne Garland, Jim Hoff, George Scherger and Frank Lucchesi
AA	Chattanooga Lookouts	Southern League	Tom Runnells
A	Cedar Rapids Reds	Midwest League	Dave Miley
A	Greensboro Hornets	South Atlantic League	Marc Bombard
Rookie	GCL Reds	Gulf Coast League	Sam Mejías
Rookie	Billings Mustangs	Pioneer League	Dave Keller

LEAGUE CHAMPIONS: Chattanooga, Cedar Rapids

== Awards and honors ==
- Ron Oester, Hutch Award
- Chris Sabo, NL Rookie of the Year

All-Star Game

- Danny Jackson, Pitcher, Reserve
- Barry Larkin, SS, Reserve
- Chris Sabo, 3B, Reserve
