= Vermont Reds =

- 1984–1987; Burlington, Vermont
Team logo
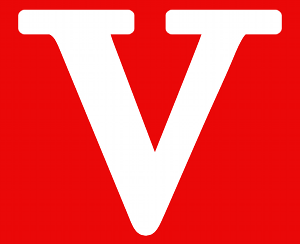
Cap insignia

Minor league affiliations
- Previous classes: Double-A
- League: Eastern League

Major league affiliations
- Previous teams: Cincinnati Reds

Minor league titles
- League titles: 1984, 1985, 1986

Team data
- Previous parks: Centennial Field

The Vermont Reds are a defunct minor league baseball team. They played in the Eastern League at Centennial Field in Burlington, Vermont from 1984 to 1987. They were affiliated with the Cincinnati Reds.

The team won the Eastern League Championship in 1984, 1985 and 1986.

== History ==
Prior to their four-year stint as the Vermont Reds, this franchise was known as the Lynn Sailors from 1980 to 1983 and served as the Double-A affiliate of the Seattle Mariners (1980 to 1982) and Pittsburgh Pirates (1983).

In 1984, owner Mike Agganis moved the Lynn Pirates from Lynn, Massachusetts to Burlington, and Agganis signed a four-year agreement with the Cincinnati Reds. The club was renamed the Vermont Reds.

After the stint as the Vermont Reds, the franchise again served as the Double-A affiliate of the Seattle Mariners in 1988, becoming the Vermont Mariners. Today, the franchise is the Double-A affiliate of the Cleveland Guardians and is known as the Akron RubberDucks.

=== Notable players ===
- Jack Armstrong
- Keith Brown
- Marty Brown
- Bob Buchanan
- Norm Charlton
- Jeff Cox
- Kal Daniels
- Iván DeJesús
- Rob Dibble
- Orlando González
- Jeff Gray
- Lenny Harris
- Chris Jones
- Tracy Jones
- Barry Larkin
- Terr Lee
- Jack Lind
- Terry McGriff
- Lloyd McClendon
- Gino Minutelli
- Jeff Montgomery
- Rob Murphy
- Joe Oliver
- Paul O'Neill
- Pat Pacillo
- Jeff Richardson
- Mike Roesler
- Chris Sabo
- Mike Smith (born 1961)
- Mike Smith (born 1963)
- Scott Terry
- Jeff Treadway
