= List of Washington Nationals no-hitters =

The Washington Nationals are a Major League Baseball franchise based in Washington, D.C. They play in the National League East division. Formed as an expansion team in 1969 as the Montreal Expos, they were based in Montreal, Quebec, through the 2004 season. In 2005 they moved to Washington, D.C., and become known as the Washington Nationals. Seven no-hitters have been pitched in franchise history, four while the team was based in Montreal as the Expos, and three as the present-day Washington Nationals.

A no-hitter is officially recognized by Major League Baseball only "when a pitcher (or pitchers) allows no hits during the entire course of a game, which consists of at least nine innings". No-hitters of less than nine complete innings were previously recognized by the league as official; however, several rule alterations in 1991 changed the rule to its current form.

Dennis Martínez threw the first and thus far only perfect game, a special subcategory of no-hitter, in Expos/Nationals franchise history on July 28, 1991, during the Expos era. As defined by Major League Baseball, "in a perfect game, no batter reaches any base during the course of the game."

The umpire is also an integral part of any no-hitter. The task of the umpire in a baseball game is to make any decision "which involves judgment, such as, but not limited to, whether a batted ball is fair or foul, whether a pitch is a strike or a ball, or whether a runner is safe or out… [the umpire's judgment on such matters] is final." Part of the duties of the umpire making calls at home plate includes defining the strike zone, which "is defined as that area over homeplate (sic) the upper limit of which is a horizontal line at the midpoint between the top of the shoulders and the top of the uniform pants, and the lower level is a line at the hollow beneath the kneecap." These calls define every baseball game and are therefore integral to the completion of any no-hitter.

The manager is another integral part of any no-hitter. The tasks of the manager include determining the starting rotation as well as batting order and defensive lineup every game.

== List of no-hitters in Expos/Nationals history ==
| ¶ | Indicates a perfect game |
| £ | Pitcher was left-handed |
| * | Member of the National Baseball Hall of Fame and Museum |

| # | Date | Pitcher | Final score | Base- runners | Opponent | Catcher | Plate umpire | Manager | Notes | Ref |
|---|---|---|---|---|---|---|---|---|---|---|
| 1 | April 17, 1969 | Bill Stoneman (1) | 7–0 | 5 | @ Philadelphia Phillies | John Bateman | Tom Gorman | Gene Mauch (1) | First no-hitter in franchise history; First no-hitter on the road in franchise history; First right-handed pitcher to throw a no-hitter in franchise history; Stoneman's fifth career start; ninth game in Expos franchise history; Fastest team to pitch a no hitter as a franchise | |
| 2 | October 2, 1972 | Bill Stoneman (2) | 7–0 | 8 | New York Mets | Tim McCarver | John McSherry | Gene Mauch (2) | First game of a doubleheader; First no-hitter at home in franchise history; First no-hitter pitched in a regular-season game in Canada | |
| 3 | May 10, 1981 | Charlie Lea | 4–0 | 4 | San Francisco Giants | Gary Carter | Jim Quick | Dick Williams | Second game of a doubleheader | |
| 4 | July 28, 1991 | Dennis Martínez^{¶} | 2–0 | 0 | @ Los Angeles Dodgers | Ron Hassey | Larry Poncino | Tom Runnells | First and only perfect game in franchise history and 13th in MLB history; Hassey becomes the first catcher of two Major League perfect games; Final no-hitter as the Montreal Expos; See also: Dennis Martínez's perfect game | |
| 5 | September 28, 2014 | Jordan Zimmermann | 1–0 | 2 | Miami Marlins | Wilson Ramos (1) | Alan Porter | Matt Williams (1) | First no-hitter as the Washington Nationals; Final day of the 2014 MLB regular season | |
| 6 | June 20, 2015 | Max Scherzer (1) | 6–0 | 1 | Pittsburgh Pirates | Wilson Ramos (2) | Mike Muchlinski | Matt Williams (2) | Only baserunner was hit by pitch with two outs in the ninth | |
| 7 | October 3, 2015 | Max Scherzer (2) | 2–0 | 2 | @ New York Mets | Wilson Ramos (3) | Tony Randazzo | Matt Williams (3) | Most recent no-hitter in Nationals history; Second game of a doubleheader; Only baserunners reached on an error with no outs in the sixth and on a force out of that runner with one out; Scherzer ties Nolan Ryan for most strikeouts in a no-hitter with 17; Scherzer struck out 9 in a row, the entire Mets lineup, during innings 6-9.; Scherzer becomes sixth pitcher with two no-hitters in one season | |

== See also ==
- List of Major League Baseball no-hitters
