= Pat Pacillo =

American baseball player (born 1963)

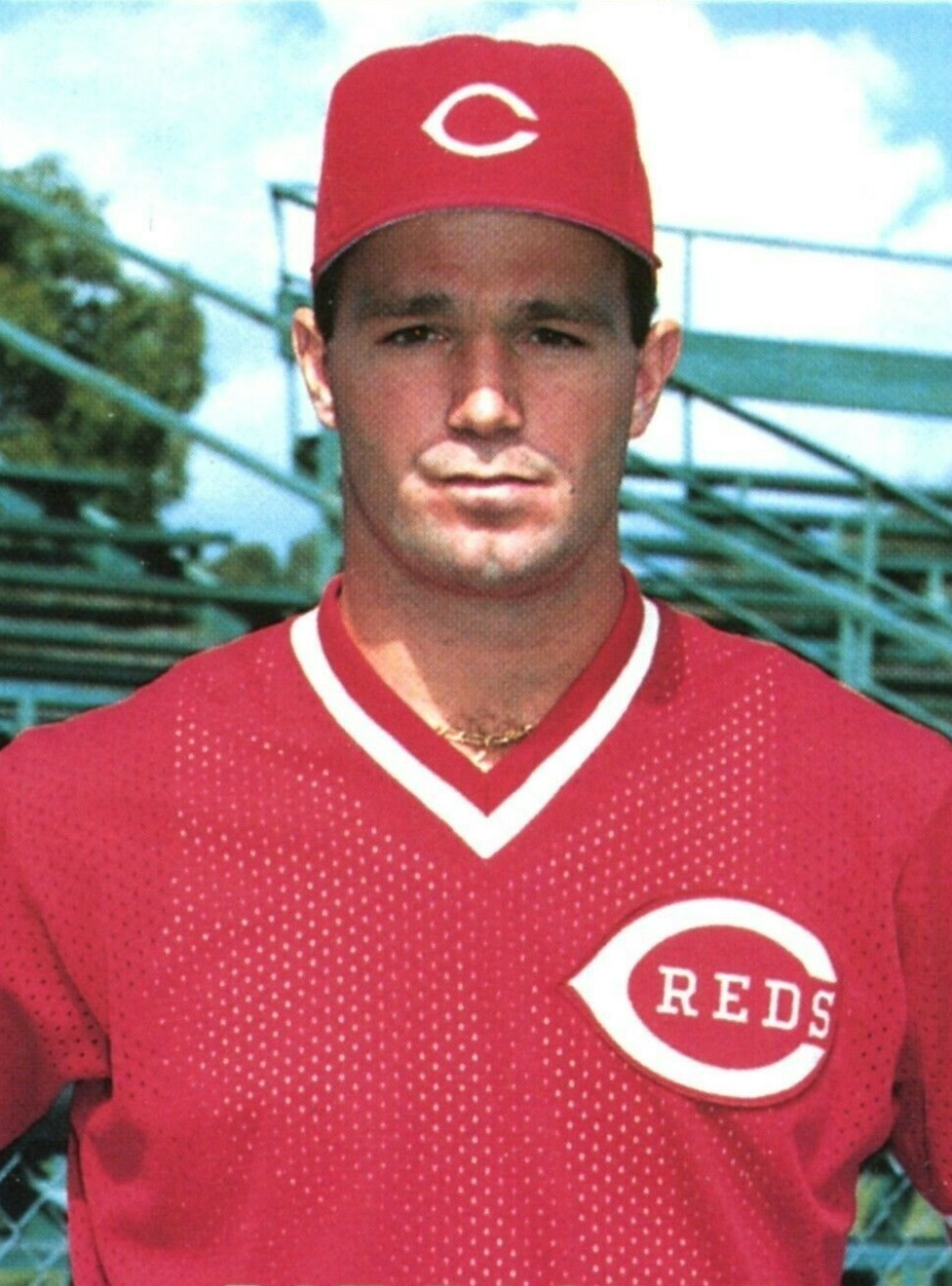
- Pitcher
- Born: July 23, 1963 (age 62); Jersey City, New Jersey, U.S.
- Batted: Right Threw: Right

MLB debut
- May 23, 1987, for the Cincinnati Reds

Last MLB appearance
- June 1, 1988, for the Cincinnati Reds

MLB statistics
- Win–loss record: 4–3
- Earned run average: 5.90
- Strikeouts: 34
- Stats at Baseball Reference

Teams
- Cincinnati Reds (1987–1988)
Medals
Men's baseball
Representing United States
Summer Olympics
| Silver medal – second place | 1984 Los Angeles | Team |

Patrick Michael Pacillo (born July 23, 1963) is an American former professional baseball player. Pacillo pitched for the Cincinnati Reds of Major League Baseball (MLB) in 1987 and 1988.

== Career ==
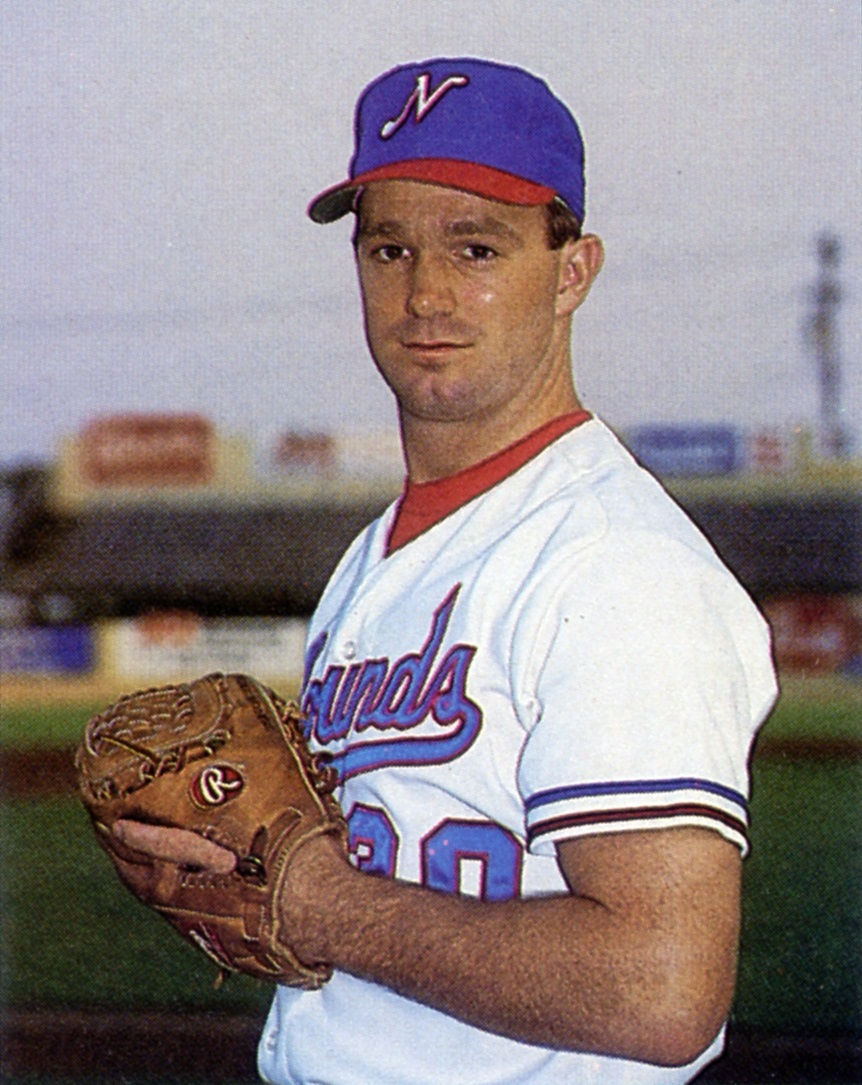
Pacillo with the Nashville Sounds in 1987

Pacillo grew up in Rutherford, New Jersey and played both baseball and football at Rutherford High School.

In 1982 and 1983, Pacillo played collegiate summer baseball for the Harwich Mariners of the Cape Cod Baseball League (CCBL). He played outfield and pitcher, batting .338 in 1983 and leading Harwich to the league title. Pacillo was inducted into the CCBL Hall of Fame in 2005.

He was drafted by the Cincinnati Reds in the 1st round (5th pick) of the 1984 MLB draft out of Seton Hall University, where he had played baseball for the Pirates under head coach Mike Sheppard.

On May 23, 1987, Pacillo made his MLB debut, in which he pitched five innings and gave up two earned runs while striking out three.

In 1988, Pacaillo was traded to the Montreal Expos along with Tracy Jones for Randy St. Claire, Jeff Reed, and Herm Winningham. He never pitched in the majors again.

Pacillo is perhaps best remembered for replacing Pete Rose on the Reds' 40-man roster following the 1986 season. Rose, who by that point was serving as the team's player-manager, removed himself from the roster in order to make room for Pacillo.

A resident of Bradley Beach, New Jersey, Pacillo works as a financial adviser.

== 1984 Olympics ==
During the 1984 Summer Olympics, Pat played baseball for the United States team. Notable teammates included Will Clark, Barry Larkin, Mark McGwire, B. J. Surhoff, Bill Swift, and Bobby Witt. The US team lost in the final to Japan.

== Sources ==
- Career statistics from Baseball Reference · Retrosheet · Baseball Almanac
- Media related to Pat Pacillo at Wikimedia Commons
