= Tracy Jones =

American baseball player (born 1961)

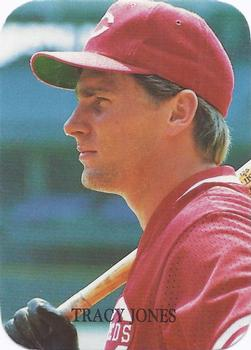
- Outfielder
- Born: March 31, 1961 (age 65); Hawthorne, California, U.S.
- Batted: Right Threw: Right

MLB debut
- April 7, 1986, for the Cincinnati Reds

Last MLB appearance
- October 6, 1991, for the Seattle Mariners

MLB statistics
- Batting average: .273
- Home runs: 27
- Runs batted in: 164
- Stats at Baseball Reference

Teams
- Cincinnati Reds (1986–1988); Montreal Expos (1988); San Francisco Giants (1989); Detroit Tigers (1989–1990); Seattle Mariners (1990–1991)

Tracy Donald Jones (born March 31, 1961) is an American former professional baseball outfielder who played for five Major League Baseball teams from 1986 to 1991.

== Playing career ==
=== Amateur career ===
Jones graduated from Hawthorne High School, then played college baseball at Loyola Marymount University in Los Angeles. In three seasons with the Lions, he batted .333 with 13 home runs and 38 stolen bases in 165 games. He was drafted by the New York Mets in the fourth round of the 1982 amateur draft but did not sign.

=== Cincinnati Reds ===
In January 1983, Jones was selected as the first overall pick of the secondary phase of the amateur draft by the Cincinnati Reds.

Jones debuted with the Reds on April 7, 1986, against the Philadelphia Phillies. In his first at-bat, he flied out facing Hall-of-Famer Steve Carlton. In his next time, he walked, then singled off Carlton for his first MLB hit in his third plate appearance. In 1987, he had his most productive season, batting .290 and stealing 31 bases in 116 games. Following the season, Jones was dubbed the "most hated player" in the National League in a USA Today poll of players.

Early in the 1988 season, Jones tripped over the bullpen mound while chasing a foul fly ball, injuring his knee and missing eight weeks of the season. After his strong 1987, he was unhappy that he was a platoon outfielder with Paul O'Neill in 1988. Twice in three games in June 1988, Jones had pinch hit walk-off walks to beat the San Diego Padres.

=== Trades and end of playing career ===
Starting in mid-1988, Jones was part of four trades in less than two years. On July 13, 1988, Jones was traded with Pat Pacillo to the Montreal Expos for Jeff Reed, Herm Winningham, and Randy St. Claire. Jones was then traded to the San Francisco Giants for Mike Aldrete on December 8.

On June 16, 1989, the Giants traded Jones to the Detroit Tigers for Pat Sheridan. Just over a year later, the Tigers traded Jones to the Seattle Mariners for Darnell Coles on June 18, 1990. On June 30, Jones was intentionally hit in the ribs by a pitch from Milwaukee Brewers pitcher Bob Sebra, setting off a 20-minute brawl that led to eight ejections.

Jones was the Mariners Opening Day left fielder in 1991, part of club's revolving door of left fielders who played alongside Hall of Famer Ken Griffey Jr. Jones played his final MLB game with the Mariners on October 6, 1991, drawing two walks in four plate appearances as the Mariners lost the last game of the season. Jones became a free agent on November 7. His baseball career ended with 66 games for the Chicago White Sox's Triple-A affiliate, the Vancouver Canadians, in 1992.

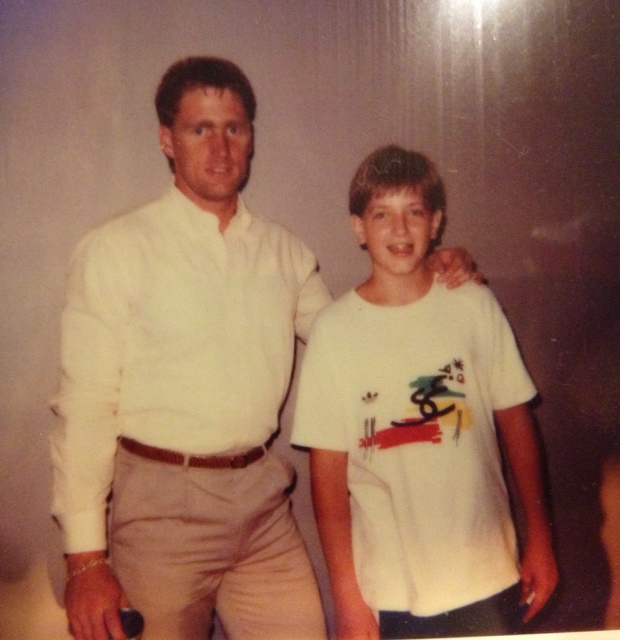
Jones with fan in 1987

== Post-playing career and personal life ==
Jones co-hosted with Eddie Fingers an afternoon radio show on radio station WLW in Cincinnati and co-hosted with longtime Reds' announcer Marty Brennaman on "Brennaman & Jones on Baseball." He was laid off on September 8, 2017.

Jones owned a financial services planning firm and became a registered investment advisor. He lives in Bellevue, Kentucky, with his wife, Denae.

Jones' son, Hunter, was drafted in the 11th round of the 2010 MLB draft by the Cleveland Indians. He played three seasons in Cleveland's minor league system, reaching the Class-A Mahoning Valley Scrappers in 2012. Cleveland released him on March 23, 2013. Hunter played in the White Sox minor league system from 2014 to 2017, then in the Washington Nationals' system in 2018 and 2019, playing in Triple-A in parts of both seasons.

Jones' father was an oil refinery worker for Chevron.
