= Providence Academy =

Providence Academy may refer to:

- Providence Academy (Rogers, Arkansas), American Christian college preparatory school
- Providence Academy (Plymouth, Minnesota), American Roman Catholic school
- Providence Academy (Green Bay, Wisconsin), American Christian school
- Providence Academy (La Crosse, Wisconsin), American Catholic school
- Providence Academy (Johnson City, Tennessee), American school
- Providence Academy in Shreveport, Louisiana, American school for black students and predecessor of Sabine Normal and Industrial Institute

== See also ==
- Providence School, a private school in Jacksonville, Florida
