= Tom Browning's perfect game =

1988 baseball game

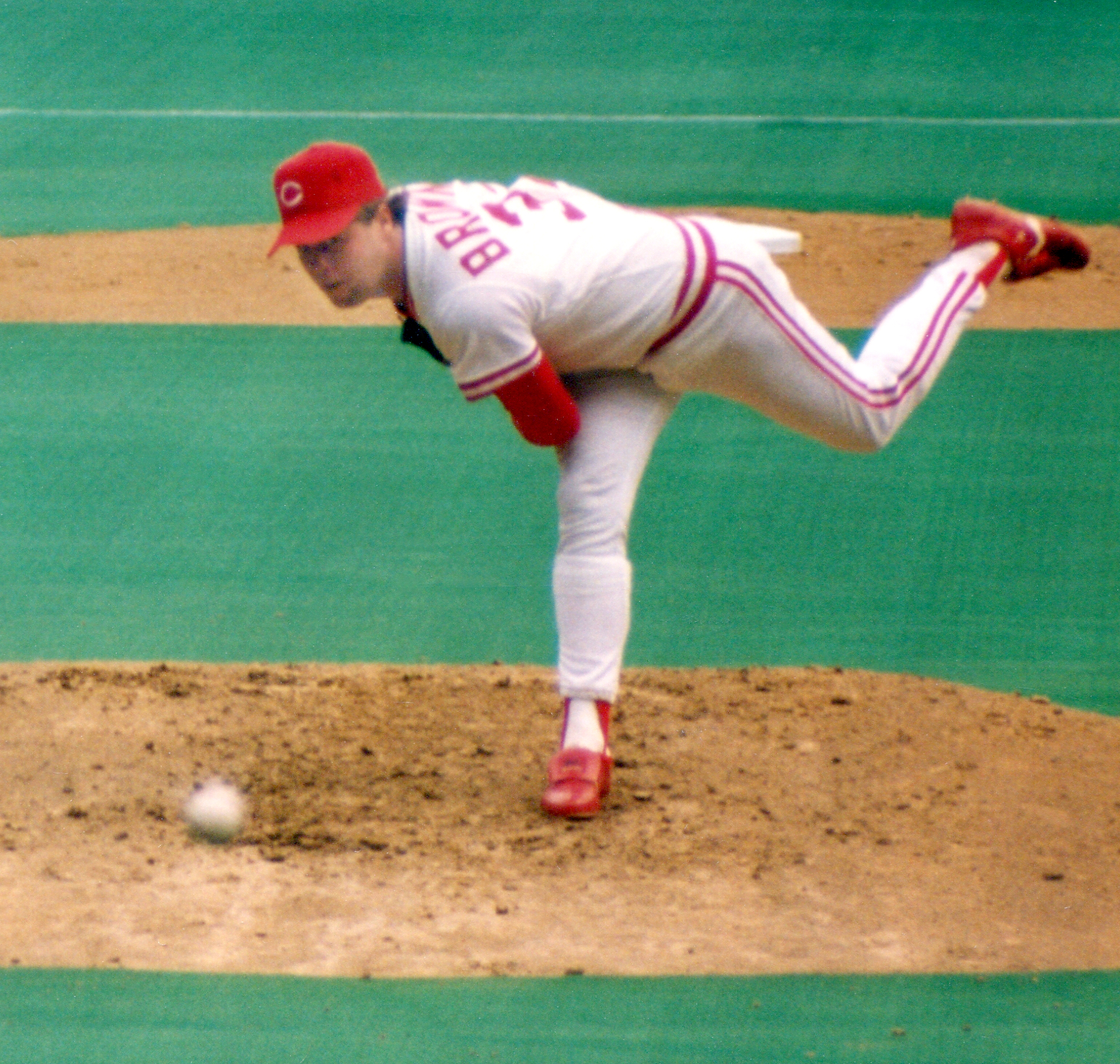
- Browning in 1991
Los Angeles Dodgers	Cincinnati Reds
0	1
	1	2	3	4	5	6	7	8	9	R	H	E
Los Angeles Dodgers	0	0	0	0	0	0	0	0	0	0	0	1
Cincinnati Reds	0	0	0	0	0	1	0	0	X	1	3	0
- Date: September 16, 1988
- Venue: Riverfront Stadium
- City: Cincinnati, Ohio
- Managers: Tommy Lasorda (Los Angeles Dodgers); Pete Rose (Cincinnati Reds)
- Umpires: HP: Jim Quick; 1B: Mark Hirschbeck; 2B: John Kibler; 3B: Eric Gregg
- Attendance: 16,591

On September 16, 1988, Tom Browning of the Cincinnati Reds pitched the 12th perfect game in Major League Baseball (MLB) history, blanking the Los Angeles Dodgers 1–0 at Riverfront Stadium. Browning became the first left-handed pitcher to pitch a perfect game since Sandy Koufax's perfect game in 1965. As of 2025, this perfect game is also the only one in Major League history to be pitched on artificial turf.

== Background ==
=== Perfect game ===
In baseball, a perfect game occurs when one or more pitchers for one team complete a full game with no batter from the opposing team reaching base. In baseball leagues that feature nine-inning games like Major League Baseball (MLB), this means the pitchers involved must record an out against 27 consecutive batters, without allowing any hits, walks, hit batsmen, uncaught third strikes, catcher's or fielder's interference, or fielding errors. It is widely considered by sportswriters to be the hardest single-game accomplishment in the sport, as it requires an incredible pitching performance, defensive support, and immense luck to pull off. Since 1876, there have been over 237,000 games officially recognized by MLB; only 24 have been perfect games. Prior to Browning's perfect game, the most recent occurrence was in 1984, when Mike Witt of the California Angels threw one against the Texas Rangers.

=== Tom Browning ===
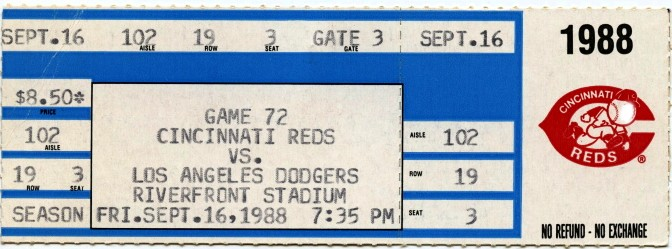
A ticket from Browning's perfect game

Tom Browning made his MLB debut in 1984 for the Cincinnati Reds. In his first full season, Browning became the first rookie since Bob Grim to win 20 games, and finished second in National League Rookie of the Year voting. By the 1987 season however, Browning's pitching had worsened, and in June, he was demoted to Triple-A. While in Triple-A, Browning revealed he had been pitching through a sore elbow. He later described the demotion as "the lowest I've ever been ... It made me realize how far I had fallen, and how hard I had to work to get back what I had lost." For the 1988 season, Browning signed a one-year contract with the Reds, and pitched well. Prior to his perfect game, he had a win-loss record of 15-5 and a 3.56 earned run average (ERA). On June 6, he took a no-hitter into the ninth inning against the San Diego Padres, which was broken up by a Tony Gwynn single.

== The game ==
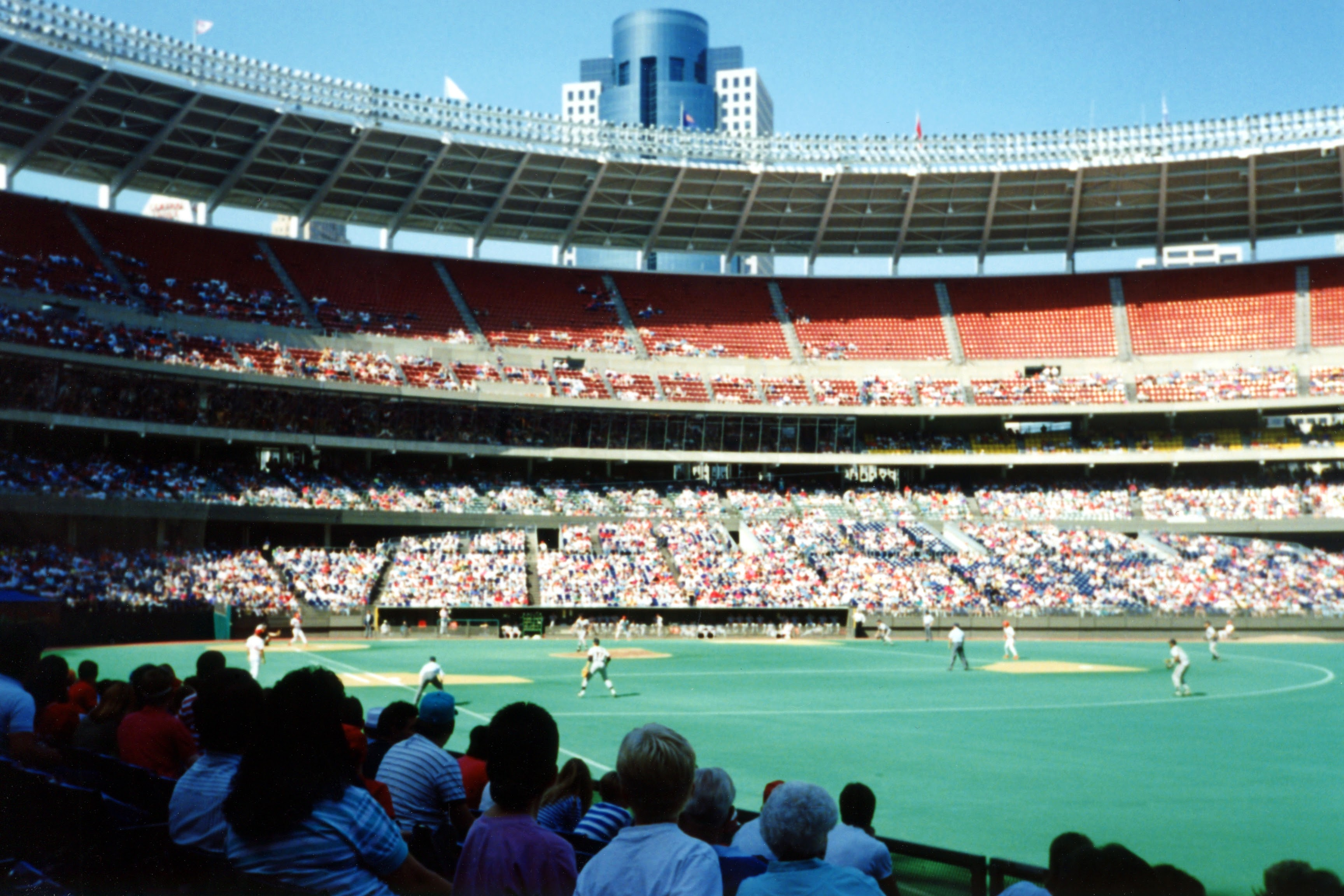
Riverfront Stadium, the site of Browning's perfect game

A two-hour, 27 minute rain delay forced the game to start at approximately 10 PM local time. The rain delay lasted longer than the game itself, played in a brisk one hour, 51 minutes.

The game's lone run came with two outs in the bottom of the sixth inning. Batting against Dodger starter Tim Belcher, himself working on a no-hitter, Reds shortstop Barry Larkin doubled and advanced to third on Chris Sabo's infield single; an error by Dodger third baseman Jeff Hamilton on the play enabled Larkin to score.

In the top of the seventh inning, Dodger left fielder Kirk Gibson was ejected by home plate umpire Jim Quick after striking out.

In the top of ninth inning, Browning first got Rick Dempsey to fly out to right field. Steve Sax then grounded out to the shortstop. Facing pinch hitter Tracy Woodson, Browning recorded his seventh strikeout of the evening, completing the perfect game.

Browning threw 70 of his 102 pitches for strikes with Catcher Jeff Reed behind the plate and did not run the count to three balls on a single Dodger hitter.

== Later developments ==
The Dodgers would go on to win the 1988 World Series—the only time, to date, that a team has won a World Series after having a perfect game pitched against it during the season. Only one other team has since earned a postseason berth after having a perfect game pitched against it during the season: the 2010 Tampa Bay Rays, who were on the losing end of Dallas Braden's perfect game on May 9, went on to win the American League East title. Not until Sean Manaea of the Oakland Athletics no-hit the eventual World Champion Boston Red Sox on April 21, 2018, would a no-hitter again be pitched against a team that would go on to win that year's World Series.

Browning's perfect game was the first of a record three that Paul O'Neill would play in as a member of the winning team. With the New York Yankees, he would be on the winning end of David Wells' and David Cone's in 1998 and 1999, respectively.

On July 4, 1989, Browning narrowly missed becoming the first male pitcher to throw two perfect games. Against the Philadelphia Phillies at Veterans Stadium, Browning retired the first 24 batters he faced. Dickie Thon then broke up the bid with a ninth-inning leadoff double. After striking out Steve Lake, Browning gave up a single to Steve Jeltz, scoring Thon. John Franco then relieved Browning and got Lenny Dykstra to hit into a game-ending double play, giving the Reds a 2–1 win.

Browning pitched for the Reds through 1994, and finished his career with the 1995 Kansas City Royals. His MLB totals include an overall record of 123–90, 3.94 ERA, and exactly 1,000 strikeouts in 1,921 innings pitched.

== Line score ==
September 16, 1988 10:02 p.m. ET at Riverfront Stadium
Team	1	2	3	4	5	6	7	8	9	R	H	E
Los Angeles Dodgers	0	0	0	0	0	0	0	0	0	0	0	1
Cincinnati Reds	0	0	0	0	0	1	0	0	x	1	3	0
WP: Tom Browning (16–5) LP: Tim Belcher (10–5); Attendance: 16,591; Notes: Duration 1:51; Umpires: Jim Quick (HP), Mark Hirschbeck (1B), John Kibler (2B), Eric Gregg (3B); Boxscore
