= Dennis Martínez's perfect game =

Baseball feat in 1991

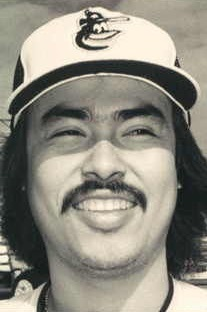
- Martínez pitched the 13th perfect game in Major League history.
| Montreal Expos | Los Angeles Dodgers |
|---|---|
| 2 | 0 |
| | 1 | 2 | 3 | 4 | 5 | 6 | 7 | 8 | 9 | R | H | E |
|---|---|---|---|---|---|---|---|---|---|---|---|---|
| Montreal Expos | 0 | 0 | 0 | 0 | 0 | 0 | 2 | 0 | 0 | 2 | 4 | 0 |
| Los Angeles Dodgers | 0 | 0 | 0 | 0 | 0 | 0 | 0 | 0 | 0 | 0 | 0 | 2 |
- Date: July 28, 1991
- Venue: Dodger Stadium
- City: Los Angeles, California
- Managers: Tom Runnells (Montreal Expos); Tommy Lasorda (Los Angeles Dodgers)
- Umpires: HP: Larry Poncino; 1B: Bruce Froemming; 2B: Dana DeMuth; 3B: Greg Bonin
- Attendance: 45,560

On July 28, 1991, Dennis Martínez of the Montreal Expos pitched the 13th perfect game in Major League Baseball history, blanking the Los Angeles Dodgers 2-0 at Dodger Stadium. A native of Granada, Nicaragua, Martínez became the first pitcher born outside of the United States to pitch a perfect game. (He has since been joined by Venezuela native Félix Hernández, who pitched a perfect game in 2012, and Dominican Republic native Domingo Germán, who pitched his perfect game in 2023.) The perfect game also made the Dodgers, the losing team in Tom Browning's perfect game in 1988, the first team to be on the losing end of consecutive perfect games; they have since been joined by the Tampa Bay Rays, who were the losing team in Mark Buehrle's perfect game in 2009 and Dallas Braden's perfect game the following year. After completing the perfect game, Martínez slowly walked into the Dodger Stadium dugout, sat down by himself and cried.

The perfect game is the last of four no-hitters in Montreal Expos history, Bill Stoneman having pitched two, in 1969 (the franchise's inaugural season, and only nine games into its history) and 1972, and Charlie Lea in 1981. After the 2004 season, the franchise moved to Washington, D.C., where it became the Washington Nationals, and would not record the first no-hitter in its Washington history until Jordan Zimmermann no-hit the Miami Marlins on September 28, 2014.

== Game summary ==
Martínez's mound opponent, Mike Morgan, also pitched all nine innings to receive credit for the complete game. Morgan himself was perfect through five innings, the latest the opposing starter in a perfect game has remained perfect.

Hall-of-Famer Larry Walker, who played right field for the vast majority of his career, made 81 appearances at first base, one of which was this game. He was involved in 17 of 27 outs: 16 putouts and one assist.

Both runs scored occurred in the top of the seventh inning. Walker hit the only run batted in (RBI), scoring Dave Martinez on a triple. On the next at bat, Walker scored on an error for the second run, with both errors of the game occurring in the seventh inning by the same player, Alfredo Griffin.

Chris Gwynn, the younger brother of Hall-of-Famer Tony Gwynn, flew out to Marquis Grissom for the game's final out.

Two days earlier, Expos starter Mark Gardner no-hit the Dodgers through nine innings but lost the no-hitter, and eventually the game, in the tenth. The Expos would have become the first team to throw a perfect game and an additional no-hitter in the same series, and would have joined the 1917 St. Louis Browns as the only teams to throw two no-hitters in the same series. On consecutive days of that season, May 5–6, Ernie Koob and Bob Groom no-hit the eventual World Champion Chicago White Sox.

Dodger Stadium, the site of Sandy Koufax's perfect game in 1965, became the first stadium to witness two perfect games; it has since been joined by Yankee Stadium, Oakland–Alameda County Coliseum and Safeco Field.

Martínez's exclusive catcher with the Expos, Ron Hassey, had previously caught Len Barker's perfect game in 1981, thus making him the first, and to date only, catcher to have caught two Major League perfect games. Hassey also became the second catcher, after Gus Triandos, to catch a no-hitter in both leagues.

The perfect game was the third losing perfect game Alfredo Griffin played in; he was also on the losing end of Tom Browning's perfect game in 1988, and Len Barker's perfect game in 1981 while with the Toronto Blue Jays. Griffin has since been joined by four Tampa Bay Rays in sharing this dubious mark: Evan Longoria, Carlos Peña, B. J. Upton and Ben Zobrist were all on the losing end of Mark Buehrle's perfect game in 2009, Dallas Braden's perfect game in 2010, and Félix Hernández's perfect game in 2012.

== Boxscore ==
| Team | 1 | 2 | 3 | 4 | 5 | 6 | 7 | 8 | 9 | R | H | E |
|---|---|---|---|---|---|---|---|---|---|---|---|---|
| Montreal Expos (43–55) | 0 | 0 | 0 | 0 | 0 | 0 | 2 | 0 | 0 | 2 | 4 | 0 |
| Los Angeles Dodgers (56–41) | 0 | 0 | 0 | 0 | 0 | 0 | 0 | 0 | 0 | 0 | 0 | 2 |
WP: Dennis Martínez (11–6) LP: Mike Morgan (9–6)
