= Tom Browning =

American baseball player (1960–2022)

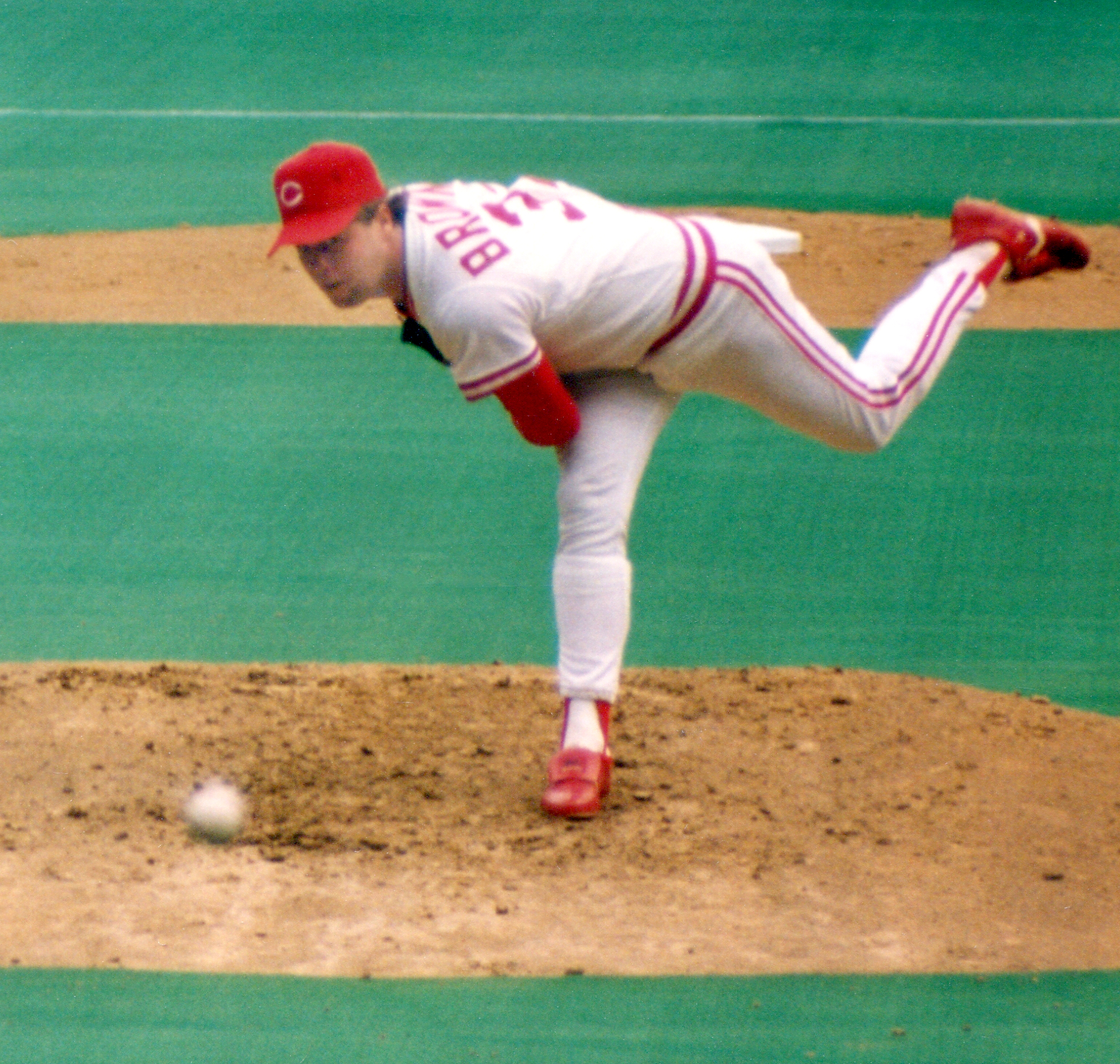
- Browning pitching for Cincinnati in 1991
- Pitcher
- Born: April 28, 1960; Casper, Wyoming, U.S.
- Died: December 19, 2022 (aged 62); Union, Kentucky, U.S.
- Batted: Left Threw: Left

MLB debut
- September 9, 1984, for the Cincinnati Reds

Last MLB appearance
- May 19, 1995, for the Kansas City Royals

MLB statistics
- Win–loss record: 123–90
- Earned run average: 3.94
- Strikeouts: 1,000
- Stats at Baseball Reference

Teams
- Cincinnati Reds (1984–1994); Kansas City Royals (1995)

Career highlights and awards
- All-Star (1991); World Series champion (1990); Pitched a perfect game on September 16, 1988; Cincinnati Reds Hall of Fame

Thomas Leo Browning (April 28, 1960 – December 19, 2022) was an American left-handed pitcher in Major League Baseball who played from 1984 to 1995, spending almost his entire career with the Cincinnati Reds. In his rookie season in 1985, Browning won 20 games and was runner-up for the National League (NL) Rookie of the Year Award; he was the Reds' first 20-game winner in 15 years, and equaled the most wins by a Cincinnati lefthander since 1925. He quickly became a mainstay in the team's pitching rotation, leading the NL in games started four of the next five years. Browning pitched the twelfth perfect game in major league history on September 16, 1988, against the Los Angeles Dodgers, just the third perfect game by a lefthander; it was the highlight of a season in which he was 18–5, posting the league's second-highest winning percentage. He helped the Reds to a sweep in the 1990 World Series, winning Game 3 against the defending champion Oakland Athletics. In 1991, his last full season, Browning was named to the NL All-Star team.

Browning's 123 wins with the Reds ranked fourth among lefthanders when he retired, and remain the most by any Reds pitcher active since 1971; his 298 starts trail only Eppa Rixey among the team's lefthanders. He later became a broadcaster and minor league pitching coach, and co-authored the book Tom Browning's Tales from the Reds Dugout. Browning was inducted into the Cincinnati Reds Hall of Fame in 2006.

== Pre-Major League Baseball career ==
=== College ===
Browning played college baseball at Le Moyne College in Syracuse from 1979 to 1981 and Tennessee Wesleyan College in Athens, Tennessee, from 1981 to 1982.

=== Minor leagues ===
Browning was drafted by the Cincinnati Reds in the ninth round of the 1982 June draft out of Tennessee Wesleyan College in Athens, Tennessee. That year, he led the Pioneer League in strikeouts and innings pitched, and after learning a screwball during the Fall Instruction League, went 8–1 with 101 strikeouts in 78 2/3 innings pitched for Class-A Tampa in 1983. He eventually earned a midseason promotion to Class-AA Waterbury and struck out 101 batters in 117 1/3 innings pitched.

Browning began the 1984 season with Class-AAA Wichita, where he went 12–10 with a league-high 160 strikeouts. On July 31 of that year, he threw a seven-inning no-hitter against Iowa and later earned a September call-up to play for Pete Rose's Cincinnati Reds. In his major-league debut, Browning beat Orel Hershiser and the Los Angeles Dodgers while pitching 8 1/3 innings and giving up just one run. He finished the year with a 1–0 record and recorded a 1.54 ERA to retain his spot on the major-league club the following season.

== Major League Baseball career ==
=== Early career ===
As a rookie, Browning went 20–9 with a 3.55 ERA for the Reds, becoming the first rookie to win 20 games since the Yankees' Bob Grim in 1954. Browning finished the season with 11 consecutive wins—the longest streak by a Cincinnati pitcher in 30 years—and was named The Sporting News' NL Rookie Pitcher of the Year. He also finished second (behind Vince Coleman) in NL Rookie of the Year voting.

Browning was superstitious and did not shave between starts. As a result, he was often photographed with a four-day stubble. He also wore red underwear on the days he pitched.

Browning would go on to post double-digit win totals for seven straight seasons and consistently ranked among the league leaders in starts, innings pitched, and shutouts. One of his best seasons came in 1988, when he went 18–5 with a 3.41 ERA and teamed with 23-game-winner Danny Jackson.

==== Perfect game ====
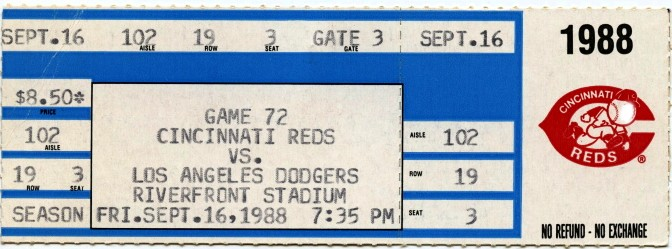
A ticket from Browning's perfect game.

On September 16, 1988, Browning pitched the 12th perfect game in baseball history. In a 1–0 victory over the Los Angeles Dodgers at Riverfront Stadium, Browning threw 70 of 102 pitches for strikes and did not run the count to three balls on a single batter. The first left-hander to pitch a perfect game since Sandy Koufax's perfect game in 1965, Browning remains the only Reds player to pitch a perfect game. Three months earlier, on June 6, 1988, Browning had a bid for a no-hitter broken up by Tony Gwynn, who singled with one out in the ninth.

Browning just missed becoming the first pitcher to hurl two perfect games, taking another bid into the ninth on July 4, 1989, against the Philadelphia Phillies at Veterans Stadium; a lead-off double by Dickie Thon broke up this attempt.

=== 1990 World Series ===
In 1990, the Reds went to the postseason for the first and only time in Browning's career. He won 15 games that season and picked up a key win over the Pittsburgh Pirates in Game 2 of the National League Championship Series. The Reds would meet the heavily favored Oakland A's in the World Series that year, but thanks in part to Browning's victory in Game 3, the Reds pulled off an unlikely sweep to become champions. "That 1990 season was, without a doubt, the most enjoyable season of baseball I have ever been a part of," he said.

Browning's wife went into labor late in Game 2 of the World Series. Browning left the stadium to be with his wife at the hospital. However, as the game entered extra innings and the Reds' manager Lou Piniella realized his pitcher was absent, the Reds called the announcers and had them issue a statement on radio and TV asking Browning to return to the ballpark in case he had to pitch. While Browning did hear the message, he stayed with his wife. The Reds won in the 10th inning.

=== Late career ===
Browning battled injuries from 1991 to 1993—going 27–26—but after a 10–4 start to the 1991 season, he earned a spot on the All-Star team, though he did not appear in the NL's 4–2 loss. Two years later on July 7, 1993, he sneaked out of Wrigley Field during a Reds-Cubs game and spent a half inning with fans on the rooftop of 3643 North Sheffield Avenue in full uniform in one of baseball's most legendary pranks. The gag earned Browning a $500 fine from Reds manager Davey Johnson.

Browning entered the 1994 season healthy. However, during a start in San Diego on May 9, Browning's arm broke while delivering a pitch to Archi Cianfrocco. The injury was gruesome, with spectators and television viewers able to see Browning's arm separate from his shoulder, and hearing a popping sound simultaneously. He missed the remainder of the season. He attempted a comeback with the Kansas City Royals in 1995, starting two games in May but losing both with an 8.10 ERA, but he decided to take the rest of the season off and to continue rehabbing his arm. He entered camp with the Royals again in 1996 but retired before the season began.

Browning retired with a 123–90 record, a 3.94 ERA, and 31 complete games. His 123 wins with the Reds rank 12th on Cincinnati's all-time leaders list.

== Post-playing career ==
In December 2005, Browning led fan balloting wire-to-wire to become a 2006 Reds Hall of Famer.

In February 2006, new Reds CEO Bob Castellini invited Browning to spring training as a special instructor. He broadcast Dayton Dragons (a Class-A affiliate of the Reds) games during the 2006 season and was the pitching coach for the Dragons' 2012 and 2015 seasons.

In 2007, Browning was named the pitching coach for the Reds' Rookie Advanced level Billings Mustangs farm club.

== Personal life ==
Browning's book, Tom Browning's Tales from the Reds Dugout, debuted in March 2006 and was co-authored by Reds employee Dann Stupp.

On March 30, 2009, Browning was arrested for non-payment of child support and was held on $99,008.36 bail.

On February 27, 2018, Browning and his three sons purchased Bart's on York, a small bar located in northern Kentucky, across the river from Great American Ballpark. The bar has been registered under the name Browning's on York; the official name change occurred on the 2018 Reds opening day.

As of August 2019, Browning's son Logan was a pitcher in the Boston Red Sox farm system.

Browning had two sisters and two brothers.

Browning was arrested and charged with an OVI (or DUI) for falling asleep and driving his car through a house on August 27, 2022, in Georgetown, Ohio. His blood alcohol content was 0.127.

=== Death ===
On December 19, 2022, Boone County, Kentucky Sheriff's Department officers and emergency personnel responded to Browning's home in Union, Kentucky. Upon arriving they found Browning not breathing. Attempts at resuscitation were unsuccessful.

== See also ==
- Major League Baseball titles leaders
- Pitchers who have thrown a perfect game

| Preceded by Mike Witt | Perfect game pitcher September 16, 1988 | Succeeded by Dennis Martínez |
| Preceded by Juan Nieves | No-hitter pitcher September 16, 1988 | Succeeded by Mark Langston & Mike Witt |
