= Dann Stupp =

American sports journalist

- Born: September 14, 1978 (age 47); Springfield, Ohio, U.S.
- Education: Missouri School of Journalism
- Occupations: Sports editor; author

Dann Stupp (born in Springfield, Ohio; September 14, 1978) is an American sports editor and author who co-founded the popular mixed martial arts website MMAJunkie.com, which USA Today acquired in 2011.

He is currently senior sports editor for The Action Network and oversees the site's coverage of MMA, boxing, NHL, NASCAR and Formula 1.

== Biography ==
Stupp was Creative Services Manager for the Cincinnati Reds when he co-founded MMAjunkie.com in 2006. He is co-author of Tom Browning's Tales from the Reds Dugout (Simon & Schuster, ISBN 1-59670-046-7, 2017), and author of Opening Day at Great American Ball Park (Sports Publishing LLC, ISBN 1-58261-724-4, 2003).

He then left the Major League Baseball team and devoted himself full-time to MMA and MMAJunkie.com. The site, which earned a "peerless reputation for providing breaking news", is the five-time World MMA Awards "Best Media Source" winner (2008-2011, 2014) and a former content partner of Yahoo! Sports.

After he sold the company to USA Today, Stupp continued to work as MMAJunkie.com's editor-in-chief, and he was also named USA Today's senior MMA editor. He left the company in 2018.

Stupp was also the managing editor for MMA and boxing at The Athletic from 2019 to 2020, where he spearheaded the 2020 MMA Fighter Survey project. He was also the weekly MMA columnist for the Dayton Daily News from 2007 to 2011, and he also covered the legal gambling industry for Catena Media.

He is the former president of the Mixed Martial Arts Journalists Association.

Stupp graduated from the University of Missouri School of Journalism with honors in 2003.
