= Stephen Larkin =

American baseball player (born 1973)

Savannah State Tigers
- Coach / First baseman
- Born: July 24, 1973 (age 53); Cincinnati, Ohio, U.S.
- Batted: Left Threw: Left

MLB debut
- September 27, 1998, for the Cincinnati Reds

Last MLB appearance
- September 27, 1998, for the Cincinnati Reds

MLB statistics
- Batting average: .333
- Hits: 1
- Runs batted in: 0
- Stats at Baseball Reference

Teams
- Cincinnati Reds (1998)

Stephen Karari Larkin (born July 24, 1973) is an American former professional first baseman. He played in one Major League Baseball (MLB) game during his career for the Cincinnati Reds in 1998. He spent most of his baseball career in the minor leagues.

Early in the 2025 college baseball season, Larkin was appointed as an assistant coach of the Savannah State Tigers baseball team.

== Playing career ==
Larkin attended the University of Texas at Austin, and played college baseball for the Texas Longhorns. He played in the College World Series in 1992 and 1993.

In 1994, he was drafted in the 10th round by the Texas Rangers and began playing in the minors for the Low-A Hudson Valley Renegades, and then for the Single-A Charleston RiverDogs in 1995. He also played thirteen games for the Winston-Salem Warthogs that same year.

In 1996, he played for the Single-A Charleston AlleyCats for half a season and again for the Winston-Salem Warthogs and stayed on with the latter for the 1997 season, as well. In 1998, he was called up from the minors, then playing for the Chattanooga Lookouts, for his game with the Cincinnati Reds. Stephen Larkin played first base, his brother Barry played shortstop, while fellow Reds Bret Boone played second base and his younger brother Aaron Boone played third base making the occasion the only time in baseball history that two sets of siblings were on the field at the same time.

Stephen Larkin's hit was a single hit on the ground, which passed between the opponent's first and second basemen during the bottom of the sixth inning of a home game against the Pittsburgh Pirates during the Reds' last game of the season, when the Reds were already eliminated from further contention for that year. The Reds won this game, 4 to 1. He spent the 1999 and 2000 seasons with the Lookouts. He finished his career by playing in the independent professional leagues from 2001 through 2005.

== Personal life ==
He is the brother of Barry Larkin, who is a member of the Baseball Hall of Fame. Another brother, Byron Larkin, was an All-American basketball player at Xavier University. They were all raised Catholic.

He attended Archbishop Moeller High School, graduating in 1991.
