= Rob Murphy =

American baseball player (born 1960)

- Pitcher
- Born: May 26, 1960 (age 66); Miami, Florida, U.S.
- Batted: Left Threw: Left

MLB debut
- September 13, 1985, for the Cincinnati Reds

Last MLB appearance
- July 22, 1995, for the Florida Marlins

MLB statistics
- Win–loss record: 32–38
- Earned run average: 3.64
- Strikeouts: 520
- Stats at Baseball Reference

Teams
- Cincinnati Reds (1985–1988); Boston Red Sox (1989–1990); Seattle Mariners (1991); Houston Astros (1992); St. Louis Cardinals (1993–1994); New York Yankees (1994); Los Angeles Dodgers (1995); Florida Marlins (1995)

Robert Albert Murphy (born May 26, 1960) is an American former professional baseball player who was a relief pitcher in Major League Baseball from 1985 to 1995. Murphy played college baseball for the University of Florida and was picked by the Cincinnati Reds in the first round with the third selection of the January 1981 amateur draft. He also played for the Boston Red Sox, Seattle Mariners, Houston Astros, St. Louis Cardinals, New York Yankees, Los Angeles Dodgers and Florida Marlins.

== Early years ==
Murphy was born in Miami, Florida. He attended Christopher Columbus High School in Miami from 1974 to 1978. He pitched for the varsity baseball team in 1977 and 1978. The 1977 team won the District championship with his 4-hit shutout. After setting school records for most wins (17) and strikeouts (207), he was drafted by the Milwaukee Brewers in the 29th round in the now-discontinued January draft.

He garnered many awards, including pre-season 1st team All American, 1st team All City, and 1st team All Catholic. Murphy's American Legion team Post 133, won its District Championship in 1976 with Murphy's 11 strikeout performance.

Murphy earned many accolades playing on the football field. For the CCHS Explorers' football team, Murphy was named to the 1976 All Catholic team, and 3rd team All County Team. In 1977, he was first-team All-Catholic, and second-team All-Dade County. By the time Murphy put away his kicking tee, he was Columbus High's All-time leading scorer on the gridiron.

Murphy was the first baseball player inducted into CCHS Baseball Diamond Hall of Fame, along with LSU Tigers baseball coach Paul Mainieri, and former Chicago Cubs general manager Jim Hendry. He was later inducted into CCHS Athletics Hall of Fame.

== College career ==
Instead of pursuing professional baseball, Murphy accepted an athletic scholarship to attend the University of Florida, where he played for the Gators. As a freshman, Murphy led the Gators in ERA (2.53), and was named the Rookie of the Year. During his sophomore year, Murphy's 3-hit shutout over Tennessee secured the Gators' second consecutive SEC Eastern Division title, while also becoming the first Gator baseball team to win 40 regular season games. His career record was 6–3 at Florida. Murphy was drafted by Cincinnati Reds in the first round as the third overall pick of the January 1982 supplemenal draft. He was only the second Gator ever selected in the first round of the Major League draft.

== Professional career ==
Cincinnati Reds Minor League System 1981 - 1985
1981 - Collected 6 wins for the Florida State League Northern Division champions, Tampa Tarpons.
1983 - Led Cedar Rapids Reds in strikeouts on the way to being Central Division champs.
1984 - Led the Eastern League in saves and captured the win in the championship game for the Eastern League title. Murphy was named Vermont Reds' Fireman of the Year.
1985 - Led the Denver Zephyrs in ERA on their way to the Western Division title of the American Association.

=== Cincinnati Reds ===
A hard fastball thrower with a sharp slider, Murphy had an disappointing debut by giving up a 400-foot home run to the first major league hitter he faced, Mike Marshall, on September 13, 1985. In his next outing, he threw with two scoreless innings.

In 1986, Murphy brought all of his potential to the mound in what was an amazing season. His ERA was 0.72, which was the lowest by a reliever pitching at least 50 innings (since surpassed by three American League players). That same season, his 4.65 hits per nine innings pitched ratio bested the previous National League (NL) records posted in 1972. (His mark has since been surpassed by many relievers.) That season, Murphy gave up only four doubles, and no triples or home runs. Batters had a .179 slugging percentage against him, lower than an almost 20-year-old record of Ted Abernathy. Murphy’s record stood for 17 years before being surpassed by Éric Gagné and Craig Kimbrel.

In 1987, he followed with another superb year as the busiest left-handed reliever in major league history. His 87 relief appearances were the most ever by a lefty, and he pitched 100.2 innings and struck out 99 batters. Four lefties have since topped this mark. His 87 appearances is still the most by a Reds left-handed pitcher, three off the franchise record, as of 2025.
In 1988, Murphy led the NL with 76 games pitched while pitching 84 2/3 innings. In four years with the Reds, Murphy had held 72 of the 78 leads he had been tasked with holding, and had stranded 79% of the runners he inherited. After the season, he was traded to the Boston Red Sox.
Comparing Murphy with all Cincinnati Reds’ pitchers that had pitched at least 200 innings, Murphy had these rankings in these categories when he had concluded his career with Cincinnati:

Category	Stat	Rank
ERA	2.60	15th
K/9	7.92	3rd
K/BB	2.26	10th
H/9	7.09	3rd
SLG%	.306	2nd
Inh. Runners	21%	1st

=== Boston Red Sox ===
In his first year with the Red Sox, Murphy collected career-highs with nine saves and 105 innings pitched behind closer Lee Smith in the Boston bullpen. Murphy’s 74 appearances eclipsed the team’s record for games pitched by a left-hander. The previous record was held by Sparky Lyle. His 105 innings pitched is also the most by a Red Sox left hander, strictly in relief. By pitching over 100 relief innings in both the American and National Leagues, Murphy joined a very short list of lefties to accomplish this feat. Only Darold Knowles and Ron Perranoski had done this before, both in 1970. Murphy was named the Red Sox Fireman of the Year (best reliever) by the Boston-area baseball writers.

1990 saw Murphy set a record for consecutive errorless games at start of career (332), previous record (175). The Red Sox won the AL East.

In 1992, Murphy set a dubious record for consecutive games without a win (146).

Murphy also pitched for the Mariners, Cardinals, Yankees, Dodgers and Marlins, retiring at the end of the 1995 season.

In an eleven-season career, Murphy, compiled a 32–38 record with 30 saves and a 3.64 ERA in 597 games. At his retirement, he ranked 18th in the history of baseball for left-handed relief appearances, and had played longer in the major leagues than any University of Florida player.

== Life after baseball ==
A horse racing and thoroughbred enthusiast, Murphy has devised his own method for handicapping and breeding. Murphy's company, M375 Thoroughbreds, Inc., has bred, raised and raced such successful horses as Platinum Tiara, Swing and Miss, Diamond Studs, Strike Three and Golden Spikes.

Murphy has also been active in charity fund-raising his career. While with the Reds, he participated in several Muscular Dystrophy Association telethons in the Cincinnati area. In Boston, Murphy worked with the Red Sox in-house charities, the Jimmy Fund and the 65 Roses Foundation. He also participated in events benefiting the ALS Association. Back at home in Florida, Murphy has attended many Redbone Organization events to benefit cystic fibrosis. Murphy continues to share his experience and expertise with the youth of Martin County by coaching baseball and softball players of all ages.

== See also ==
- Florida Gators
- List of Florida Gators baseball players

== Bibliography ==
- Gary Gillette, Peter Gammons, Pete Palmer, The ESPN Baseball Encyclopedia, Sterling Publishing (2005). ISBN 1-4027-4771-3.
