= Keith Brown (baseball) =

American baseball player (born 1964)

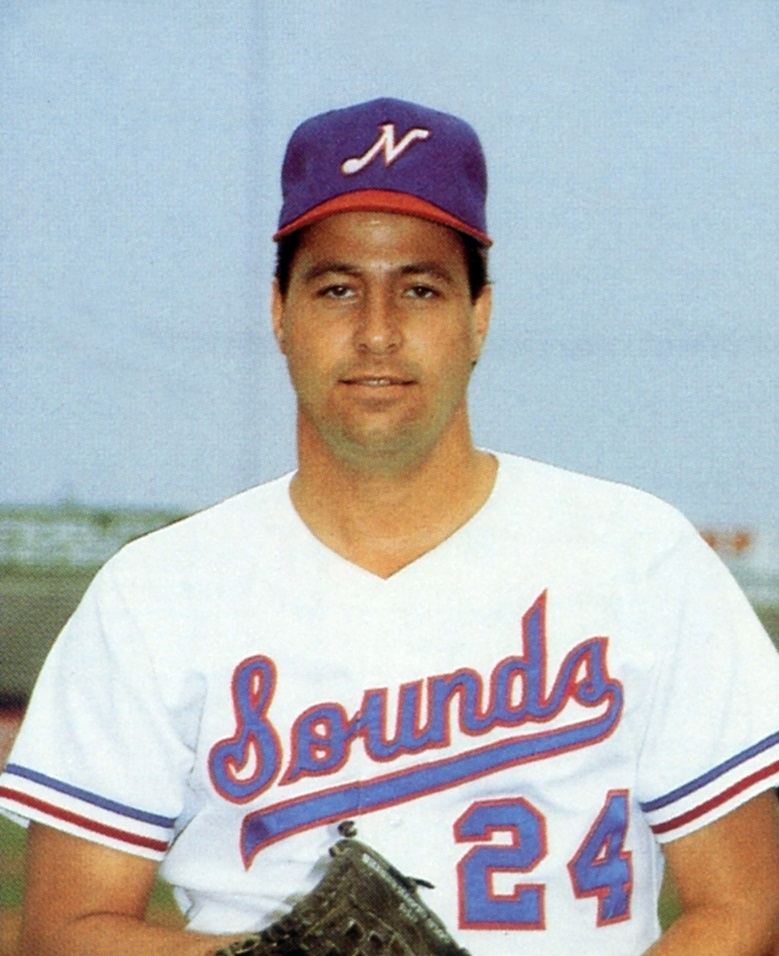
- Brown in 1988
- Pitcher
- Born: February 14, 1964 (age 62); Flagstaff, Arizona, U.S.
- Batted: Switch Threw: Right

MLB debut
- August 25, 1988, for the Cincinnati Reds

Last MLB appearance
- July 11, 1992, for the Cincinnati Reds

MLB statistics
- Win–loss record: 2–2
- Earned run average: 3.40
- Strikeouts: 23
- Stats at Baseball Reference

Teams
- Cincinnati Reds (1988, 1990–1992)

Keith Edward Brown (born February 14, 1964) is an American former professional baseball pitcher. He played parts of four seasons in Major League Baseball (MLB) for the Cincinnati Reds from 1988 to 1992.

== Career ==
Brown was drafted by the Reds in the 21st round of the 1986 MLB draft. Brown played his first professional season with their rookie-level affiliates (the Gulf Coast League Reds and Billings Mustangs) and their Double-A Vermont Reds in 1986. He played his final season with the Florida Marlins' Triple-A affiliate, the Charlotte Knights, in 1995.

Bill James writing of Brown said he had superb control but not much of a fastball.
