= Jim Quick =

American baseball umpire (born 1943)

- Born: September 6, 1943 (age 81); Sacramento, California, U.S.
- Occupation: Former Major League Baseball umpire

James Edward Quick (born September 6, 1943) is an American former Major League Baseball umpire who worked in the National League in 1974 and again from 1976 to 1998. Quick wore uniform number 15 for most of his career.

== Minor leagues ==
Quick began his umpiring career in the Northwest League in 1968. He then umpired in the California League in 1969, the Texas League in 1970, and the Pacific Coast League from 1971 to 1975.

== Major leagues ==
Quick made his Major League debut on August 4, 1974, during a doubleheader between the Cincinnati Reds and San Diego Padres at San Diego Stadium. He umpired 16 games that season before becoming a full-time umpire in 1976.

Quick worked in three All-Star games (1981, 1983 and 1991), two National League Division Series (1981 and 1996), five National League Championship Series (1979, 1987, 1989, 1993 and 1995) and the 1985 and 1990 World Series.

As the home plate umpire in Game Six of the 1985 World Series, Quick called Jim Sundberg safe on Dane Iorg's ninth-inning single for the winning run in the Kansas City Royals' 2–1 victory over the St. Louis Cardinals. The inning is best known for Don Denkinger incorrectly calling Jorge Orta safe on a ground ball leading off the inning; with the Royals trailing 3 games to 2 in the Series and 1–0 on the scoreboard, the call shifted the momentum both of the game and the Series for the Royals, who won 11–0 the next evening.

== Achievements ==
Quick was the home plate umpire for four no-hitters during his career: Tom Browning's perfect game on September 16, 1988, Jerry Reuss's no-hitter on June 27, 1980, Charlie Lea's on May 10, 1981 and Tommy Greene's on May 23, 1991. The latter two no-hitters were the only ones in the 28-year history (1977–2004) of Olympic Stadium. Quick was also the home plate umpire for Nolan Ryan's 3000th career strikeout on July 4, 1980 and Steve Carlton's 300th career victory on September 23, 1983, and was the first-base umpire for Pete Rose's 4191st career hit on September 8, 1985, which put Rose in a first-place tie with Ty Cobb for the Major League lead.
