= Van Snider =

American baseball player (born 1963)

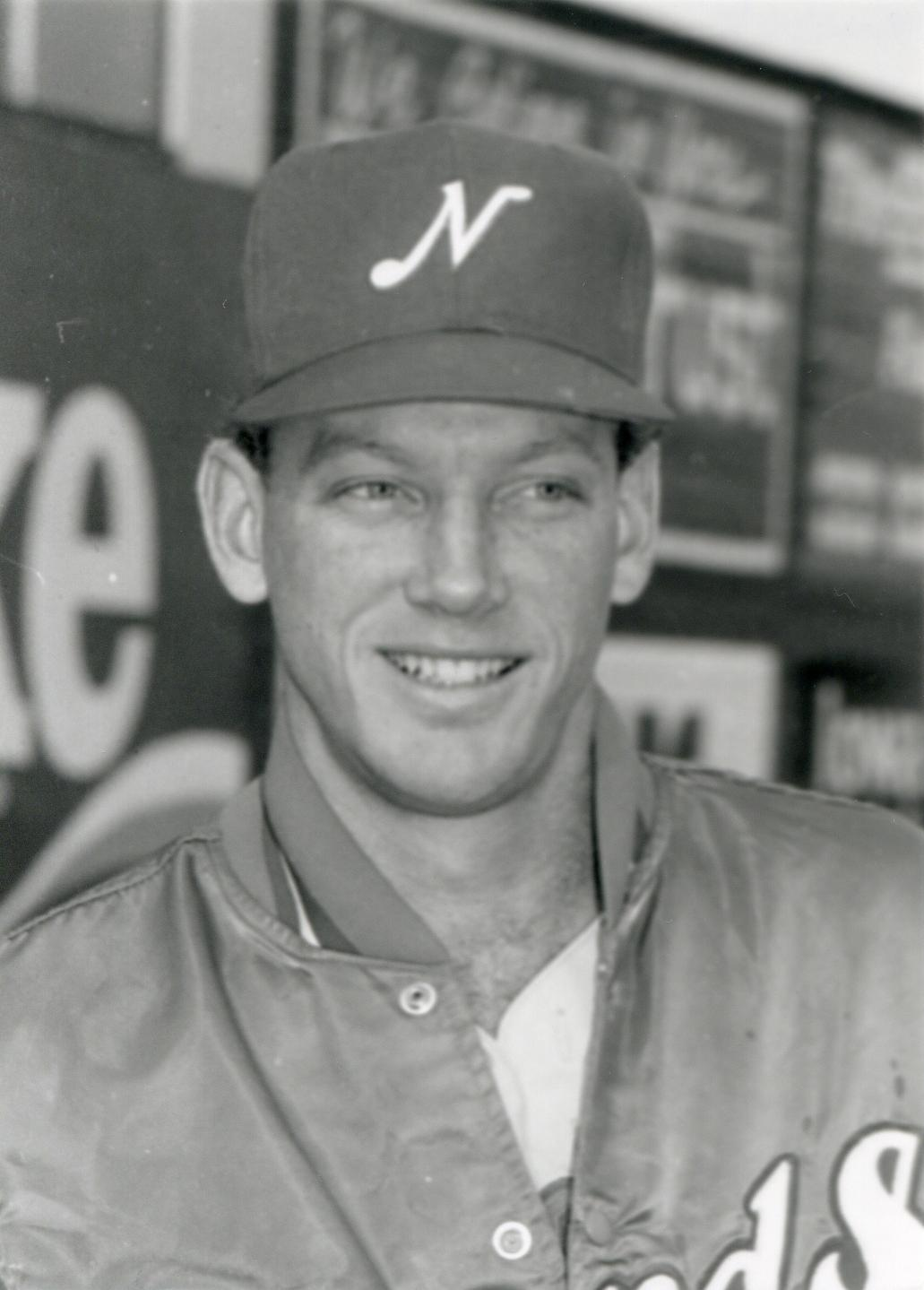
- Outfielder
- Born: August 11, 1963 (age 61); Birmingham, Alabama, U.S.
- Batted: Left Threw: Right

MLB debut
- September 22, 1988, for the Cincinnati Reds

Last MLB appearance
- July 29, 1989, for the Cincinnati Reds

MLB statistics
- Batting average: .200
- Home runs: 1
- Runs batted in: 6
- Stats at Baseball Reference

Teams
- Cincinnati Reds (1988–1989)

Van Voorhees Snider (born August 11, 1963) is an American former Major League Baseball outfielder for the Cincinnati Reds.

Snider attended Shades Valley High School in Alabama where, in 1981, he committed to play college baseball for the UAB Blazers. In November 1981, however, he was attending Gadsden State Junior College when he signed a professional contract with the Kansas City Royals.

He played parts of two seasons for the Cincinnati Reds in 1988 and 1989. The Reds traded Jeff Montgomery to the Kansas City Royals for him on February 15, 1988, and he made his debut with Cincinnati on September 2, 1988, against the Chicago Cubs. After the 1989 season he was traded to the New York Yankees, along with Tim Leary, for Hal Morris and minor leaguer Rodney Imes. Snider never again played at the major league level, although he continued to play in the minors until 1995.

Snider later became a police detective for the city of Mayfield Heights, Ohio, advancing to the rank of corporal. Snider is also part of the Drug Enforcement Unit which was established by the SPAN Chiefs and serves the local suburbs of Mayfield Heights, Mayfield Village, Lyndhurst, Highland Heights, Gates Mills, and Richmond Heights.

Snider is married to former Mayfield Heights councilwoman Diane Marzano Snider and has six children.
