= Eddie Milner =

American baseball player (1955–2015)

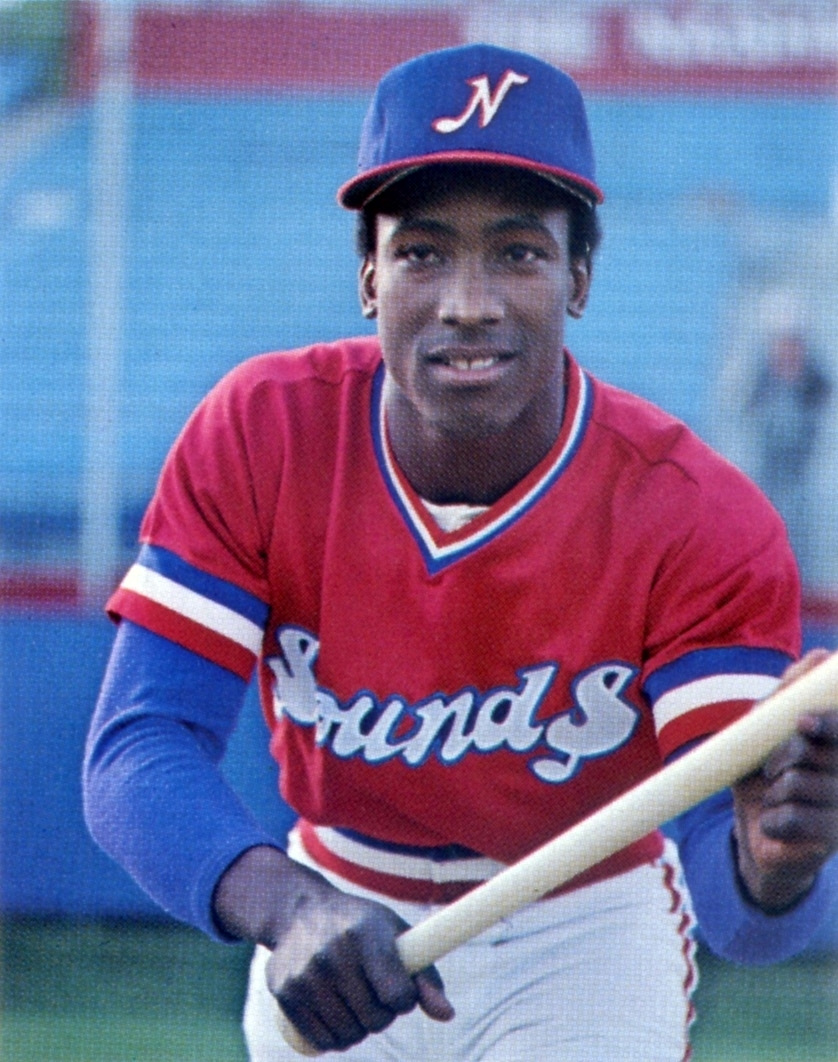
- Milner with the Nashville Sounds in 1979
- Center fielder
- Born: May 21, 1955; Columbus, Ohio, U.S.
- Died: November 2, 2015 (aged 60); Cincinnati, Ohio, U.S.
- Batted: Left Threw: Left

MLB debut
- September 2, 1980, for the Cincinnati Reds

Last MLB appearance
- July 29, 1988, for the Cincinnati Reds

MLB statistics
- Batting average: .253
- Home runs: 42
- Runs batted in: 195
- Stats at Baseball Reference

Teams
- Cincinnati Reds (1980–1986); San Francisco Giants (1987); Cincinnati Reds (1988)

Edward James Milner Jr. (May 21, 1955 – November 2, 2015) was an American professional baseball player. He played all or parts of nine seasons in Major League Baseball for the Cincinnati Reds (1980–86, 1988) and San Francisco Giants (1987), primarily as a center fielder. Milner batted and threw left-handed.

== Baseball career ==
Milner was drafted out of Central State University in Wilberforce, Ohio by the Reds in 1976. He was a part of the disappointing transition of the championship Cincinnati Reds teams of the 1970s. The Reds transitioned from players including Ken Griffey Sr., George Foster, and Ray Knight, taking their chances with players including Milner, Gary Redus, and Clint Hurdle. A highlight of Milner's career was a 20-game hitting streak in 1986 in which he had batted .417 to go along with a .667 slugging percentage.

Milner suffered from cocaine addiction during his baseball career. Commissioner Peter Ueberroth suspended him for the entire 1988 season after he relapsed, but he was reinstated before the All-Star break after completing a drug rehabilitation program. The Reds released him on July 31, ending his major league career.

== Career statistics ==
In a nine-year major league career, Milner played in 804 games, accumulating 607 hits in 2,395 at bats for a .253 career batting average along with 42 home runs, 195 runs batted in and an on-base percentage of .333. Defensively, he finished his career with a .987 fielding percentage playing at all three outfield positions. Along with César Tovar, Milner is regarded as the all-time major league leader in breaking up no-hit attempts with five. On August 2, 1986, Milner collected his team's only hit in a game for fifth time, tying Tovar's major league record (1975).

== Personal life ==
Milner's cousin, John Milner, was also a major league player.

Milner died on November 2, 2015, in Cincinnati.
