= Larry Poncino =

American baseball umpire (1957–2024)

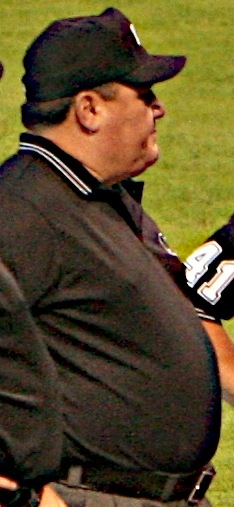
- Poncino in 2007
- Umpire
- Born: February 3, 1957; Los Angeles, California, U.S.
- Died: July 14, 2024 (aged 67); Tucson, Arizona, U.S.

MLB debut
- July 11, 1985

Last MLB appearance
- September 20, 2007

Career highlights and awards
- Special assignments: League Championship Series (1998, 2003, 2005); Division Series (2006); All-Star Games (1996); Home plate umpire for Dennis Martínez's perfect game (July 28, 1991)

Larry Louis Poncino (February 3, 1957 – July 14, 2024) was an American umpire in Major League Baseball. His Major League umpiring debut came on July 11, 1985, and his last game was on September 30, 2007. He umpired in the 2006 American League Division Series; the National League Championship Series in 1998, 2003, and 2005, and the 1996 MLB All-Star Game. Poncino wore uniform number 13 during his National League stint, then changed to 39 when the NL and AL umpiring staffs merged in 2000.

== Umpiring career ==
Poncino was the plate umpire for Dennis Martínez's perfect game on July 28, 1991. On June 28, 2007, Poncino was the home plate umpire when Craig Biggio got his 3,000th hit against the Colorado Rockies. Poncino served in the National League from 1985 to 1988 and from 1991 to 1999. He worked in both leagues from 2002 to 2007.

Poncino retired due to a neck injury.

== Personal life and death ==
Poncino was married to Jo Ann. He attended the University of Nevada-Reno from 1975 to 1976.

Poncino died at his home in Tucson, Arizona, on July 14, 2024, at the age of 67.

== See also ==
- List of Major League Baseball umpires (disambiguation)
