= Providence Academy (Johnson City, Tennessee) =

Location
- 2788 Carroll Creek Road; Johnson City, Tennessee 37615; United States
- Coordinates: 36°20′12.5502″N 82°26′07.6466″W

Information
- Type: Private, Coeducational
- Motto: In Loco Parentis
- Religious affiliation: Christian
- CEEB code: 431007
- Administrator: Ben Holland
- Grades: K–12
- Colors: Maroon and gold
- Song: "In Your Hands, Oh Lord"
- Nickname: Knights
- Publication: Soft Whispers - Creative Writing Anthology
- Yearbook: The Shield
- Website: www.providenceacademy.com

Providence Academy is a Christian school in Johnson City, Tennessee, serving grades K-12.

In 2025 it had about 574 students. Knights are the school mascot.

Its football team was established in 2022. Daniel Kilgore coaches the football team. It also has a baseball team and plays John S. Battle High School of Bristol, Virginia and Science Hill High School.
