= Jeff Reed (baseball) =

American baseball player (born 1962)

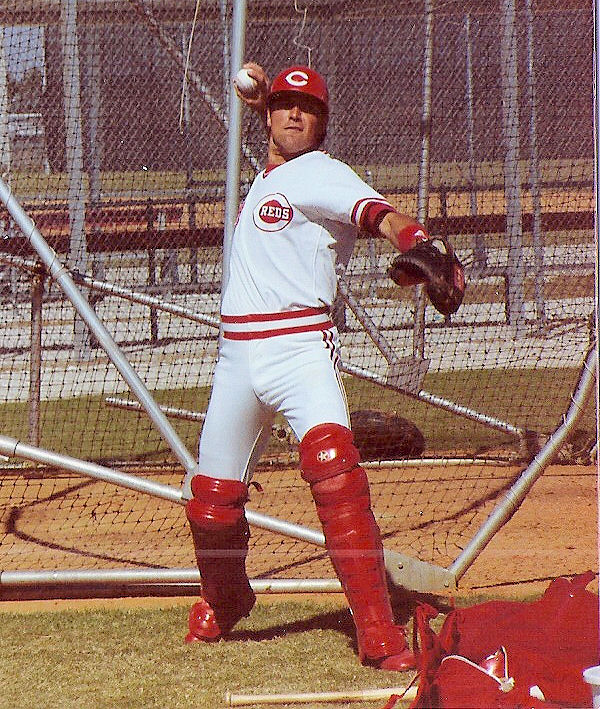
- Catcher
- Born: November 12, 1962 (age 63); Joliet, Illinois, U.S.
- Batted: Left Threw: Right

MLB debut
- April 5, 1984, for the Minnesota Twins

Last MLB appearance
- October 1, 2000, for the Chicago Cubs

MLB statistics
- Batting average: .250
- Home runs: 61
- Runs batted in: 323
- Stats at Baseball Reference

Teams
- Minnesota Twins (1984–1986); Montreal Expos (1987–1988); Cincinnati Reds (1988–1992); San Francisco Giants (1993–1995); Colorado Rockies (1996–1999); Chicago Cubs (1999–2000)

Career highlights and awards
- World Series champion (1990)

Jeffrey Scott Reed (born November 12, 1962) is an American former Major League Baseball catcher who played for the Minnesota Twins (1984–1986), Montreal Expos (1987–1988), Cincinnati Reds (1988–1992), San Francisco Giants (1993–1995), Colorado Rockies (1996–1998) and Chicago Cubs (1999–2000). He batted left-handed and threw right-handed. He is currently a coach with the Providence Knights.

== Career ==
Reed was the Twins' first-round pick (and 12th overall) in the 1980 amateur draft.

Despite playing for 17 seasons in the majors, he was usually relegated to a backup role. Reed rarely appeared in more than 100 games per year. He was regarded as a solid defensive catcher.

On February 3, 1987, Reed was traded from the Twins along with Neal Heaton, Yorkis Perez and Al Cardwood to the Expos for Jeff Reardon and Tom Nieto.

On September 16, 1988, Reed, filling in for an injured Bo Díaz, caught Tom Browning's perfect game in the Cincinnati Reds' 1–0 victory over the Los Angeles Dodgers at Riverfront Stadium. In his autobiography, Browning credited Reed as an integral part of the performance: "He did a phenomenal job, especially considering what was at stake in the later innings."

During the late innings of Browning's perfect game, Reed had to continually slow down his pitcher. According to Browning's book, Reds manager Pete Rose was worried that his pitcher was working too quickly, which could lead to an errant pitch. At one point in the game, Reed stood up and raised his arms, palms facing out, to signal Browning to slow down.

Jeff Reed was a part of the Cincinnati Reds 1990 World Series winning squad when his team beat the Oakland Athletics in four, sweeping them.
