= Jeff Treadway =

American baseball player (born 1963)

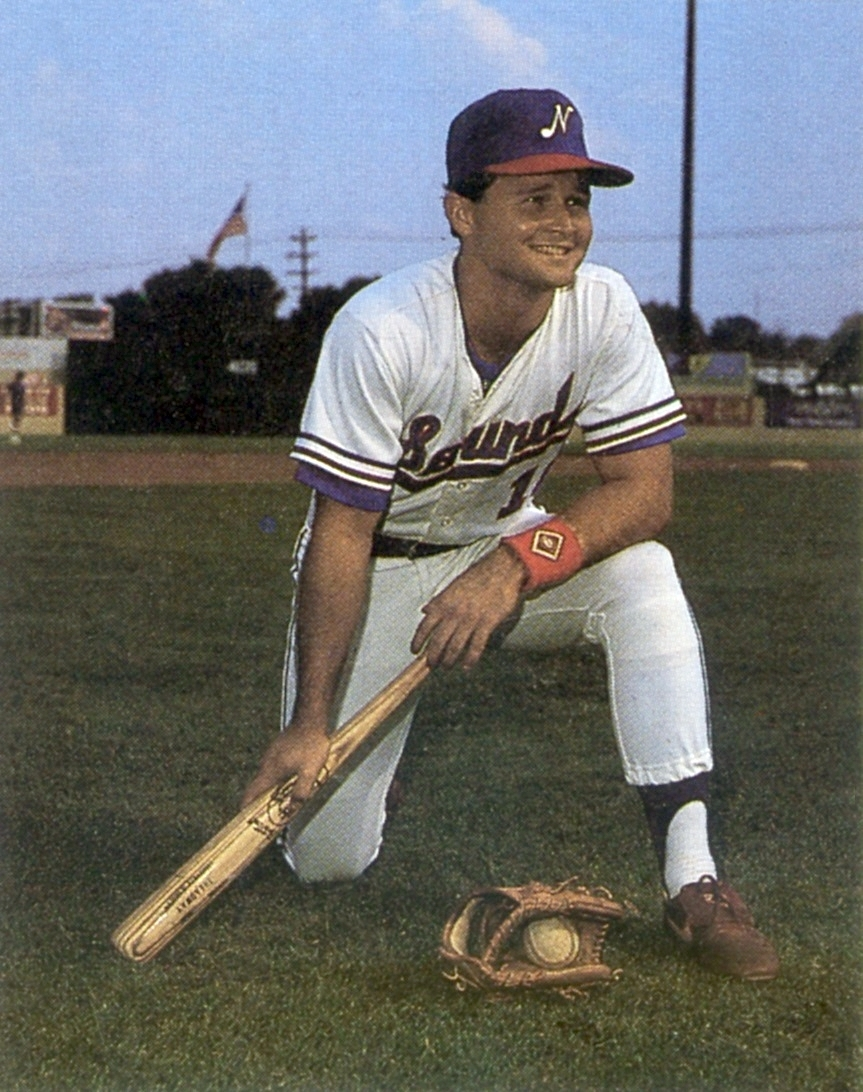
- Treadway with the Nashville Sounds in 1987
- Second baseman
- Born: January 22, 1963 (age 63); Columbus, Georgia, U.S.
- Batted: Left Threw: Right

MLB debut
- September 4, 1987, for the Cincinnati Reds

Last MLB appearance
- September 12, 1995, for the Montreal Expos

MLB statistics
- Batting average: .281
- Home runs: 28
- Runs batted in: 208
- Stats at Baseball Reference

Teams
- Cincinnati Reds (1987–1988); Atlanta Braves (1989–1992); Cleveland Indians (1993); Los Angeles Dodgers (1994–1995); Montreal Expos (1995)

Hugh Jeffrey Treadway (born January 22, 1963) is an American former professional baseball second baseman. He played in Major League Baseball (MLB) for the Cincinnati Reds, Atlanta Braves, Cleveland Indians, Los Angeles Dodgers, and Montreal Expos between 1987 and 1995. Due to injuries leading to shoulder and hand surgeries as well as position battles, he only averaged 84 games per year. His career batting average was .281. His postseason hitting was clutch, in just 8 games he had 11 at bats with 4 hits and a walk for an OPS of .780. Both Atlanta World Series appearances he played in finished with losses, in 1991 to the Twins and in 1992 to the Blue Jays.

Treadway was born in Columbus, Georgia, and was drafted by the Montreal Expos in the 18th round of the 1981 MLB January Draft-Regular Phase from Middle Georgia College. The beginning of his MLB career started in 1987 with the Cincinnati Reds undrafted. He was traded / sold at the end of spring training in 1989 to the Atlanta Braves. His full-time role there lasted two and a half years before Mark Lemke started to take over second base duties. By far the biggest offensive highlight of his career came on May 28, 1990. It was in Veteran's Stadium in Philadelphia on the night the Phillies were retiring future Hall Of Famer Mike Schmidt's number. Treadway hit three home runs that night off three different pitchers. There was one more full season of part-time play in 1992 for Atlanta before being released.

Within a month he was signed by the Cleveland Indians. His full season of play for the Tribe meant him playing more games at third base than second. He was granted free agency at the end of the 1993 season.

In late 1993 the Los Angeles Dodgers signed Treadway, where he played an even mix of second and third base until May of the 1995 season. He was then traded to the team that had originally tried to draft him out of high school, the Montreal Expos. 41 games and 55 at bats there were his final as a major leaguer. He announced his retirement on September 16, 1995.

Treadway attended the University of Georgia and played baseball for the Bulldogs from 1982 to 1983.

He is one of the few major leaguers to have successfully completed the hidden ball trick, accomplishing it at least twice.

After leaving major league baseball, Treadway managed the minor league Macon Braves for two seasons starting in 1999. He then joined the staff of Stratford Academy in 2003, where he has managed the Macon, Georgia-based high school baseball and softball programs. He led the baseball team to the GISA State Championship in 2007 and the fast-pitch softball team to GISA state championships in 2009, 2010, 2011, and 2012. As of 2022, he is an assistant baseball coach at Stratford.
