= Terry McGriff =

American baseball player (born 1963)

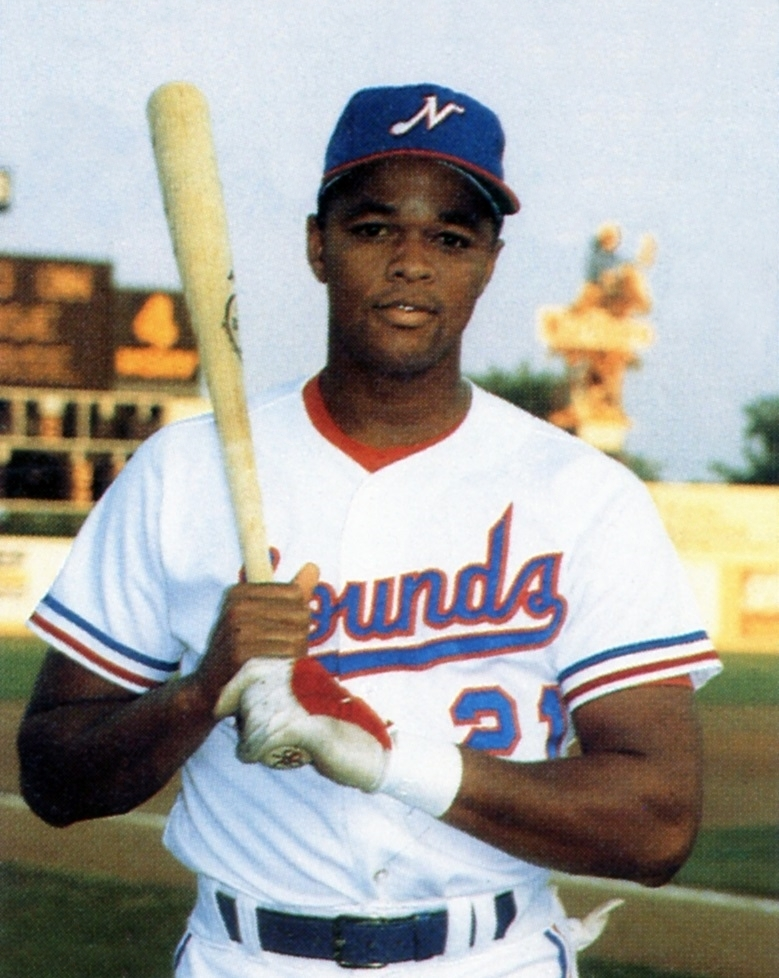
- McGriff with the Nashville Sounds in 1988
- Catcher
- Born: September 23, 1963 (age 63); Fort Pierce, Florida, U.S.
- Batted: Right Threw: Right

MLB debut
- July 11, 1987, for the Cincinnati Reds

Last MLB appearance
- August 7, 1994, for the St. Louis Cardinals

MLB statistics
- Batting average: .206
- Home runs: 3
- Runs batted in: 30
- Stats at Baseball Reference

Teams
- Cincinnati Reds (1987–1990); Houston Astros (1990); Florida Marlins (1993); St. Louis Cardinals (1994)

Terence Roy McGriff (born September 23, 1963) is an American former professional baseball catcher. He played in Major League Baseball (MLB) for the Cincinnati Reds, Houston Astros, Florida Marlins, and St. Louis Cardinals.

== Career ==
He was drafted by the Cincinnati Reds in the 8th round of the 1981 Major League Baseball draft, and he made his MLB debut on July 11, 1987. After retiring from playing, he became the bench/hitting coach for the Bridgeport Bluefish.

On August 7, 1988, McGriff caught a no-hitter with batterymate Jack Armstrong of the Triple-A Nashville Sounds. The game was one walk shy of being a perfect game.

McGriff is a second cousin to Fred McGriff and first cousin to Charles Johnson, both of whom are former major league All-Stars.
