= Barry Larkin =

American baseball player (born 1964)

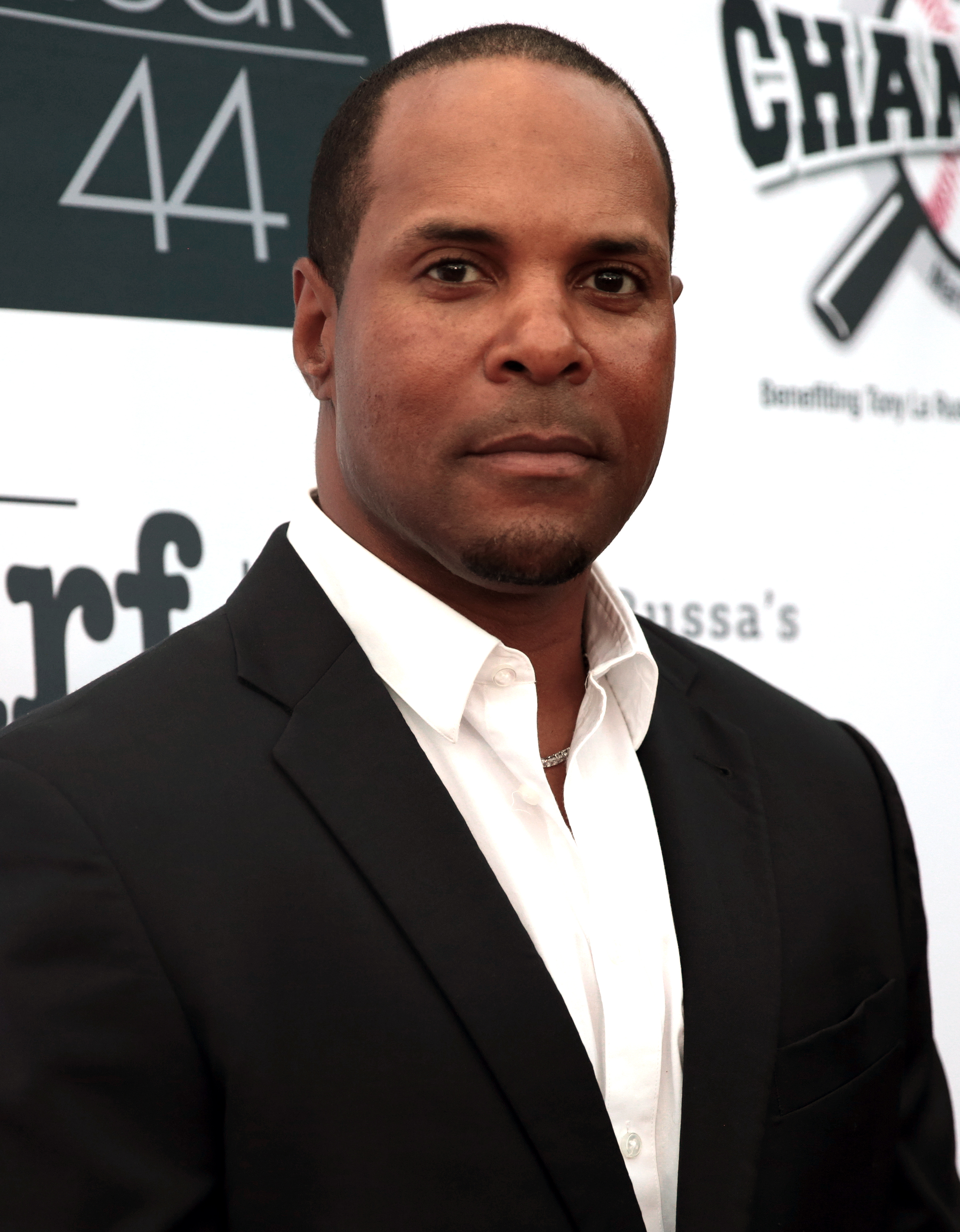
- Larkin in 2017
- Shortstop
- Born: April 28, 1964 (age 62); Cincinnati, Ohio, U.S.
- Batted: Right Threw: Right

MLB debut
- August 13, 1986, for the Cincinnati Reds

Last MLB appearance
- October 3, 2004, for the Cincinnati Reds

MLB statistics
- Batting average: .295
- Hits: 2,340
- Home runs: 198
- Runs batted in: 960
- Stolen bases: 379
- Stats at Baseball Reference

Teams
- Cincinnati Reds (1986–2004)

Career highlights and awards
- 12× All-Star (1988–1991, 1993–1997, 1999, 2000, 2004); World Series champion (1990); NL MVP (1995); 3× Gold Glove Award (1994–1996); 9× Silver Slugger Award (1988–1992, 1995, 1996, 1998, 1999); Roberto Clemente Award (1993); Cincinnati Reds No. 11 retired; Cincinnati Reds Hall of Fame

Member of the National

Baseball Hall of Fame
- Induction: 2012
- Vote: 86.4% (third ballot)
Medals
Men's baseball
Representing United States
Olympics
| Silver medal – second place | 1984 Los Angeles | Team |

Barry Louis Larkin (born April 28, 1964) is an American former professional baseball shortstop. As a player he spent his entire 19-year Major League Baseball (MLB) career with the Cincinnati Reds from 1986 to 2004.

He briefly played in the minor leagues before making his MLB debut in 1986. He quickly won the starting shortstop role for the Reds and enjoyed a long run of strong seasons with the team. Larkin struggled with a string of injuries between 1997 and 2003, limiting his playing time in several seasons.

Larkin retired after the 2004 season and worked in a front-office position for the Washington Nationals for several years until he joined ESPN as a baseball analyst. He served as a coach for the American team in the 2009 World Baseball Classic and managed the Brazilian national team for the same event in 2013.

Larkin is considered one of the top players of his era, winning nine Silver Slugger awards, three Gold Glove awards, and the 1995 National League Most Valuable Player Award. He was selected to the Major League All-Star Game twelve times, and was one of the pivotal players on the 1990 Reds' World Series championship team. In 2012, Larkin was elected to the National Baseball Hall of Fame.

== Early life and amateur career ==
Born and raised in the Cincinnati suburb of Silverton, Ohio, and raised Catholic, Larkin attended Archbishop Moeller High School.

Larkin accepted a football scholarship to the University of Michigan to play for coach Bo Schembechler, but during his freshman year, he decided to play baseball exclusively. He was a two-time All-American and led the Wolverines to berths in two College World Series, in 1983 and 1984, the program's last until 2019. Larkin was also named Big Ten Player of the Year in 1984 and 1985. Larkin's number 16 was retired by the school on May 1, 2010.

Larkin played for the United States national team at the 1984 Summer Olympics.

== Minor league career ==
Barry Larkin played with the Vermont Reds on their team that won the 1985 Eastern League Championship and in 1986 was the Rookie of the Year and Triple-A Player of the Year with the Denver Zephyrs. In all, he played only 177 minor league games in his professional career.

== MLB career ==
=== 1986–1996 ===
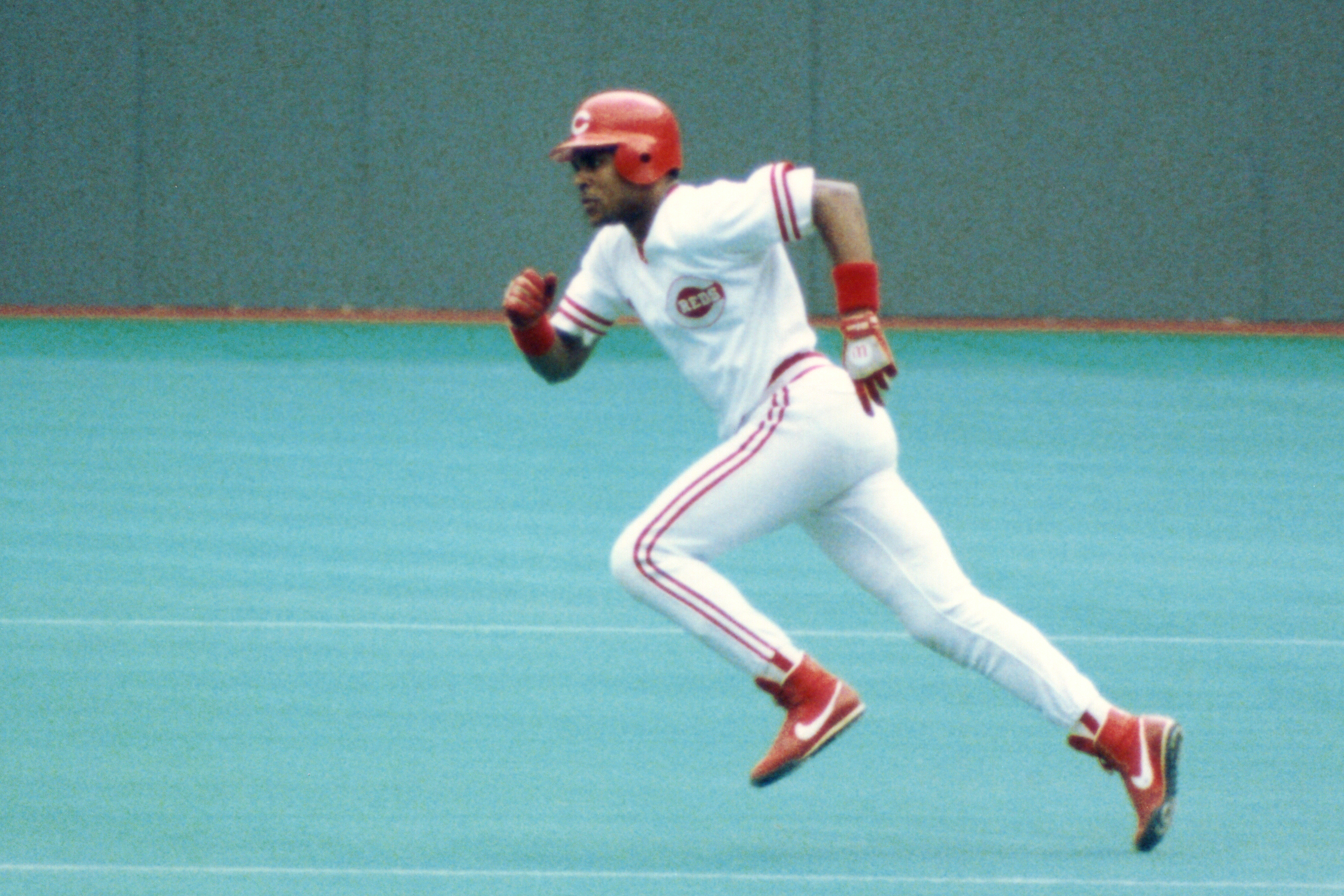
Larkin playing in Riverfront Stadium in 1990

After arriving in the majors, Larkin battled fellow prospect Kurt Stillwell for the starting shortstop spot before establishing himself as the starter in 1987. In 1988, Larkin led all major leaguers by striking out only 24 times in 588 at-bats. The 1990 team saw the Reds make the playoffs for the first time in 14 years with a wire-to-wire campaign to win the NL West. Larkin struggled in batting during the NLCS against the Pittsburgh Pirates, which saw him record just three hits in the first four games, although he did score a run in Game 1, 2, and 3. In Game 5 and 6, he recorded two hits each while also scoring a run in both as Cincinnati won the series in six games to make the World Series. Facing the Oakland Athletics, he had six hits in four games that saw him score a run in three of the four games while collecting a triple and RBI in Game 3; in total, he batted .300 during the postseason as the Reds defeated Oakland in four games for what proved to be Larkin's only championship. On June 27–28, 1991, Larkin became the first shortstop ever to hit five home runs over two consecutive games. He earned his fourth consecutive All-Star Game selection that season.

After the 1991 season, Larkin questioned the Reds' commitment to winning. He said he was likely to leave the team when his contract expired the next year, but he was encouraged when the Reds acquired pitchers Tim Belcher and Greg Swindell in the offseason. In January 1992, the Reds signed him to a five-year, $25.6 million contract. At that time, only four players had larger contracts and Larkin was the highest-paid shortstop. Larkin was not selected as an All-Star in 1992, but he won his fifth consecutive Silver Slugger Award. In 1993, he won the Roberto Clemente Award, which recognizes players who display sportsmanship, community service and on-field ability. In 1995, Larkin finished sixth in batting (.319) and second in stolen bases (51) to win the National League's MVP award, the first by a shortstop since Maury Wills in 1962. He led the Reds to the National League Central division title and first playoff appearance in five years. In the postseason, Larkin had five hits in his first three games that saw the Reds win the League Division Series over Los Angeles to make it to the National League Championship Series versus the Atlanta Braves. Despite having a hit in each of the four games, including three in Game 2, the Reds lost in a sweep to the eventual World champion Braves. As it turned out, this proved to be Larkin's last postseason appearance as a player; his 24 postseason hits rank sixth in franchise history, ranking behind five players of the "The Big Red Machine" era.

In 1996, Larkin hit a career-high 33 home runs and stole 36 bases, becoming the first shortstop in Major League history to join the 30–30 club. He arguably had a better season in 1996 than he had in his MVP year of 1995, as his on-base percentage and slugging percentage were both improved.

=== 1997–2000 ===
Larkin was named the Reds' captain before the 1997 season, making him the first player to hold the honor since Dave Concepción's retirement. Beginning that season, Larkin suffered a series of injuries throughout the last few years of his career. He missed 55 games that year due to injuries to his calf and Achilles tendon. About three weeks before the opening of the 1998 season, Larkin decided to undergo neck surgery for a perforated disk. He was not in severe pain, but he was unable to lift his arm enough to play defense.

On September 27, 1998, Barry, his brother Stephen Larkin, second baseman Bret Boone, and third baseman Aaron Boone all played the infield at the same time for the last game of the 1998 season, making it the first time in MLB history that an infield was composed entirely of two pairs of brothers. In 1999, Larkin was nearly traded to the Los Angeles Dodgers. He later said that he was approached by a Los Angeles clubhouse attendant, who gave him a Dodgers jersey with his name on it. The jersey had been prepared as trade negotiations advanced so that the teams could be prepared for a press conference about the trade. The Reds came close to reaching the playoffs again with a late surge to tie with the New York Mets for the wild card spot with 96 wins (after finishing one game behind Houston for the NL Central). In the tie-breaker game for the Wild Card, Larkin went hitless and the Reds were shutout to end their season. Also in 1999, Larkin served as a pre-game analyst for NBC's coverage of the World Series alongside host Hannah Storm.

In July 2000, Larkin blocked a trade to the New York Mets to remain with the Reds. The trade would have sent three players, top minor league outfielder Alex Escobar, pitcher Eric Cammack and pitcher Jason Saenz, from the Mets to the Reds in exchange for Larkin. Larkin said that he would have gone to New York, as he enjoyed playing there, but the Mets did not want to sign him to a multi-year contract. The Reds signed him to a three-year contract extension worth $27 million. In the 2000 season, Larkin missed 59 games after he injured his finger twice and he suffered a knee sprain. He underwent finger surgery in April and knee surgery in September.

=== 2001–2004 ===
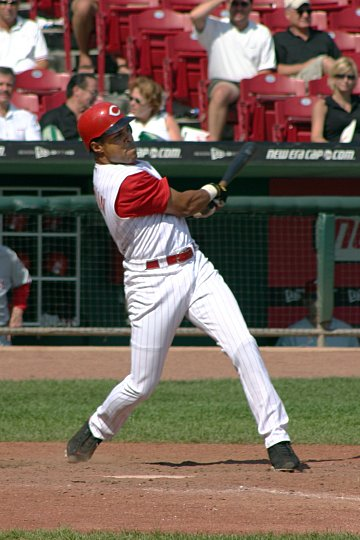
Larkin in 2004

Larkin struggled with a groin injury in 2001, prompting criticism of his play. Broadcaster Joe Nuxhall said on air that Larkin had "lost it". By August, the injury had limited Larkin to 45 games. He underwent season-ending surgery for a hernia that had been diagnosed during an evaluation of the groin injury. During the 2002 season, Larkin played in 145 games but hit for the lowest batting average (.245) since his first full year in the major leagues. Though he did not miss many games, Larkin dealt with injuries to his rib cage, hamstring, shoulder, neck and toe.

In 2003, Larkin had spent two stints on the disabled list with calf injuries by late May. During strained contract negotiations with Reds chief operating officer John Allen in late 2003, Larkin almost left the team. Larkin and the Reds agreed to a one-year contract for 2004. Larkin called off a planned retirement ceremony scheduled for October 2, 2004, because he was not sure if he would retire. In that season, Larkin hit for a .289 batting average in his final season. He announced his retirement in February 2005.

Commenting on Larkin's retirement after such a strong season, sports columnist Terence Moore drew a comparison to the retirement of Ted Williams. He wrote, "Barry Larkin wasn't quite Williams at the end, but he was in the vicinity when it comes to the big picture... After years of injuries, he showed what a healthy Larkin still could do, but he also showed that he preferred to leave the game more like Williams than just about anybody else you can name in baseball history." In his 19-year career with Cincinnati, Larkin hit .295 with 2,340 hits, 198 home runs, 960 RBI, 1,329 runs scored, and 379 stolen bases. Baseball writer Bill James has called Larkin one of the greatest shortstops of all time, ranking him #6 all time in his New Bill James Historical Baseball Abstract. Despite missing significant playing time in six seasons, Larkin won the Gold Glove Award three times (1994–1996) and was a 12-time All-Star (1988–1991, 1993–1997, 1999, 2000, and 2004). He became the first major league shortstop to join the 30–30 club when he had 33 home runs and 36 stolen bases in 1996.

== Post-retirement ==
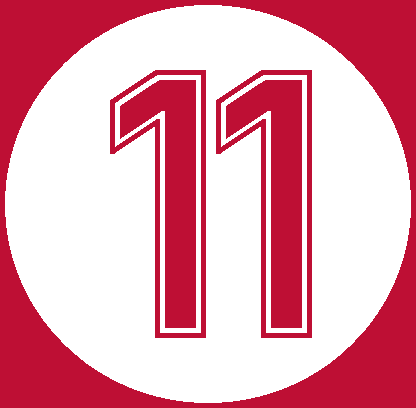
Barry Larkin's number 11 was retired by the Cincinnati Reds in 2012.

After his retirement, Larkin was hired as a special assistant to the general manager in the Washington Nationals organization. With the Nationals, he worked under former Reds general manager Jim Bowden. Larkin had hoped to work for the Reds, but USA Today reported that his 2003 contract disagreement with Allen eliminated that opportunity. In 2008, he signed with the MLB Network as a studio analyst.

He was the bench coach for the United States at the 2009 World Baseball Classic and managed the United States' second-round game against Puerto Rico when U.S. manager Davey Johnson left to attend his stepson's wedding. On July 20, 2008, he was inducted into the Cincinnati Reds Hall of Fame and Museum. In 2009, he was inducted into the National College Baseball Hall of Fame.

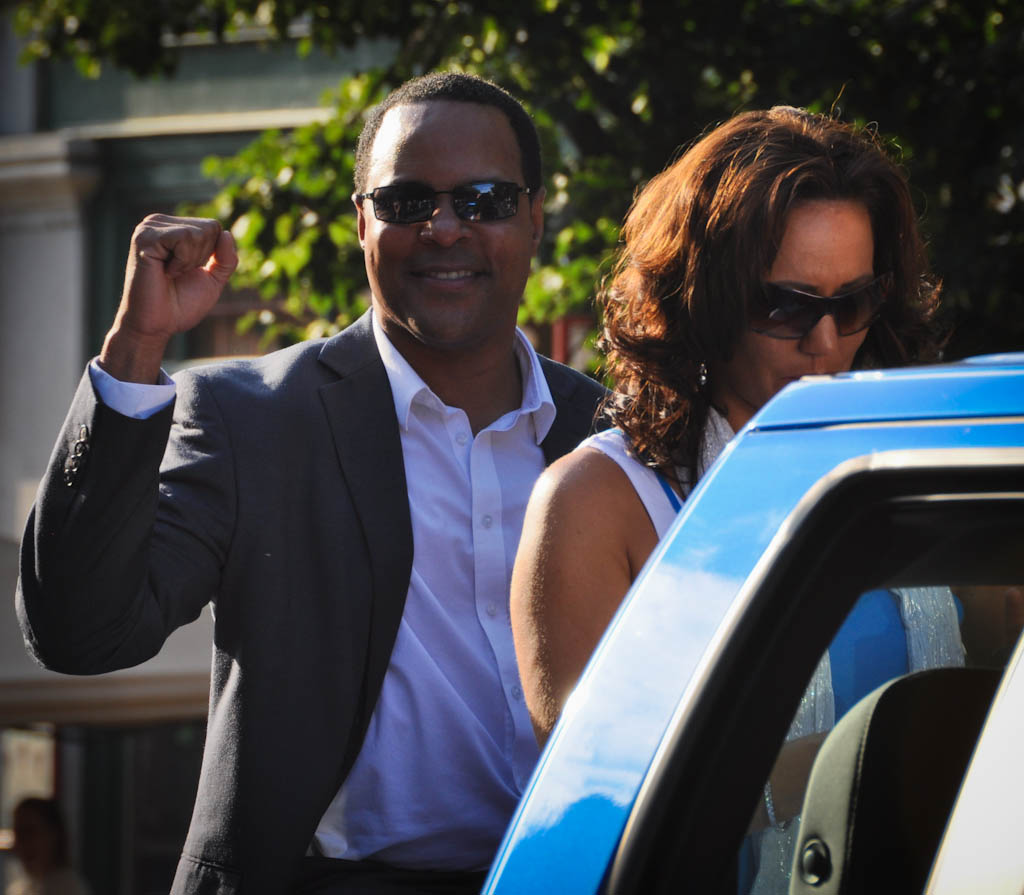
Larkin at the 2013 Baseball Hall of Fame induction parade

In 2011, Larkin left Washington for ESPN to serve as a Baseball Tonight analyst.

In 2012, Larkin was voted into the Hall of Fame with 86.4% of the vote. He was the eighth Reds player and 24th shortstop inducted to the Hall of Fame. On August 25, 2012, his number 11 was retired in an official ceremony at Great American Ball Park. In 2010, his first year of eligibility for the Hall of Fame, Larkin had received 51.6% of the vote (75 percent is needed for election). In 2011, he received 62.1% of the vote, the highest of non-inducted players and third overall.

He was invited by the Brazilian Baseball Federation to manage their national team in the qualifiers for the 2013 World Baseball Classic. Brazil beat host country Panama in Brazil's first time to qualify for the event. Larkin said Brazil was originally scheduled to play in Puerto Rico, but because of the huge Japanese baseball influence in Brazil, they played in Japan. The team played Cuba and China besides the home country. The team went winless in its WBC debut and was eliminated after the first round.

In November 2013, Detroit Tigers general manager Dave Dombrowski confirmed that the organization had intended to interview Larkin for its open managerial position. Larkin declined the interview due to the time commitment associated with the job. Brad Ausmus was named the new Tigers manager on November 3, 2013.

In November 2014, the Tampa Bay Times reported that Larkin was among 10 candidates interviewed for the Tampa Bay Rays' managerial job. Larkin was not among the team's three finalists, and the job ultimately went to Kevin Cash. Larkin joined the Cincinnati Reds as a minor-league roving infield instructor in May 2015. He helped out the big-league club during spring training 2016. When asked whether he hoped to manage in the future, he said, "Never say never. The conditions have to be right and, you know, the manager's job, at least in my opinion, is not about just having the manager's position. It's about having the support system to support that manager's position."

In September 2016, Larkin managed Brazil at the 2017 World Baseball Classic qualification, where the team failed to qualify for the final tournament after losing to Great Britain.

On February 16, 2021, it was announced that Larkin joined the Reds' television broadcast team on Fox Sports Ohio.

In July 2022, Larkin became an executive partner of the newly formed United International Baseball League, the first professional baseball league in the Middle East and South Asia; in November, it was announced that the league had been renamed Baseball United and that he had joined its ownership group.

On January 29, 2025, it was announced that Larkin would join the effort to bring Major League Baseball to Orlando, Florida as the MLB Ambassador for the Orlando Dreamers.

== Sports diplomacy ==
Larkin has also been an active participant in the SportsUnited Sports Envoy program for the U.S. Department of State. In this function, he has traveled to Colombia, Ecuador, India, Lithuania, Taiwan, where he worked with to conduct baseball clinics and events that reached more than 2,200 youth from underserved areas. In so doing, Larkin helped contribute to SportsUnited's mission to reach out to youth populations in order to promote growth and a stable democratic government.

== Personal life ==
Larkin's brother, Stephen Larkin, was also a professional baseball player; he made it to the major leagues for one game with the Reds in 1998. Another brother, Byron Larkin, was a second-team All-American basketball player at Xavier University and is the color commentator on Xavier basketball radio broadcasts. Larkin's eldest brother, Mike, was a captain of the Notre Dame football team in 1985. They were all raised Catholic.

Larkin and his wife have two daughters and a son, Shane. The family lives in Orlando, Florida. Shane played two seasons at the University of Miami before being a first round draft pick in the 2013 NBA draft. He played for four NBA teams in 4 seasons, starting 41 times. Larkin's daughters play lacrosse. His oldest daughter, Brielle D'Shea, is named in honor of Shea Stadium, as Larkin enjoyed playing there.

== See also ==
- List of Major League Baseball career hits leaders
- List of Major League Baseball career runs scored leaders
- List of Major League Baseball career stolen bases leaders
- List of Major League Baseball players who spent their entire career with one franchise
- 30–30 club

| Preceded by David Justice | National League Player of the Month; June 1991 | Succeeded by Barry Bonds |
