= Randy St. Claire =

American baseball player and coach (born 1960)

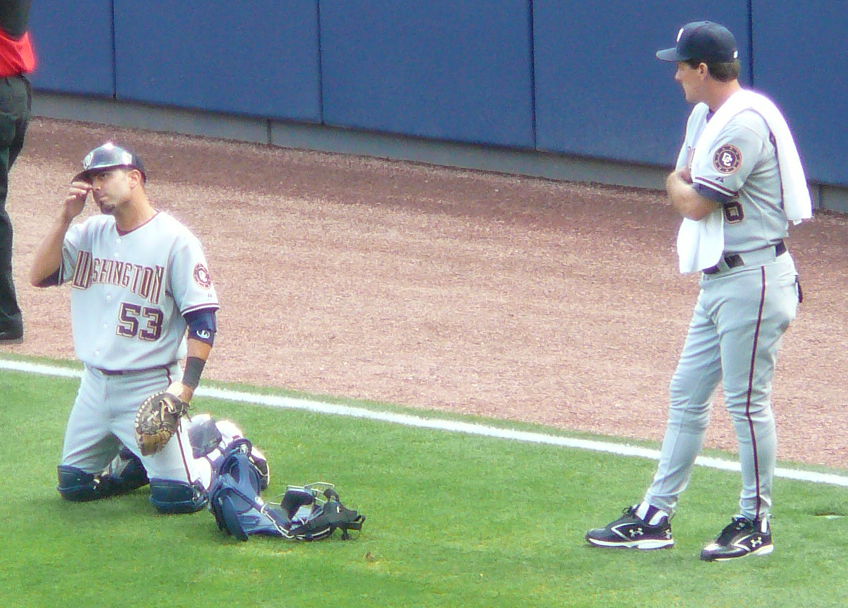
- St. Claire (right) with Nationals catcher Wil Nieves in 2008.
- Pitcher
- Born: August 23, 1960 (age 66); Glens Falls, New York, U.S.
- Batted: Right Threw: Right

MLB debut
- September 11, 1984, for the Montreal Expos

Last MLB appearance
- May 31, 1994, for the Toronto Blue Jays

MLB statistics
- Win–loss record: 12–6
- Earned run average: 4.14
- Strikeouts: 160
- Stats at Baseball Reference

Teams
- As player: Montreal Expos (1984–1988); Cincinnati Reds (1988); Minnesota Twins (1989); Atlanta Braves (1991–1992); Toronto Blue Jays (1994); As coach: Montreal Expos/Washington Nationals (2002–2009); Florida Marlins/Miami Marlins (2010–2013)

Randy Anthony St. Claire (born August 23, 1960) is an American former professional baseball pitcher and current coach. He played all or part of nine seasons in Major League Baseball for the Montreal Expos (1984–88), Cincinnati Reds (1988), Minnesota Twins (1989), Atlanta Braves (1991–92) and Toronto Blue Jays (1994) as a relief pitcher. He made one World Series appearance with the Braves in 1991, pitching the 9th inning of a Game 5 blowout win. He worked as pitching coach for the Montreal Expos/Washington Nationals and Miami Marlins before being hired by the Blue Jays organization.

St. Claire worked seven years as the pitching coach for the Montreal Expos, later the Washington Nationals. The team fired him on June 2, 2009. On October 27, 2009, the Miami Marlins hired him as their pitching coach.

He is the son of former major league catcher Ebba St. Claire. His brother Steve St. Claire had a four-year minor league baseball career.

== Coaching ==
On January 13, 2014, St. Claire was named as the pitching coach for the Toronto Blue Jays Triple-A affiliate Buffalo Bisons.

== See also ==
- List of second-generation Major League Baseball players
