= Herm Winningham =

American baseball player (born 1961)

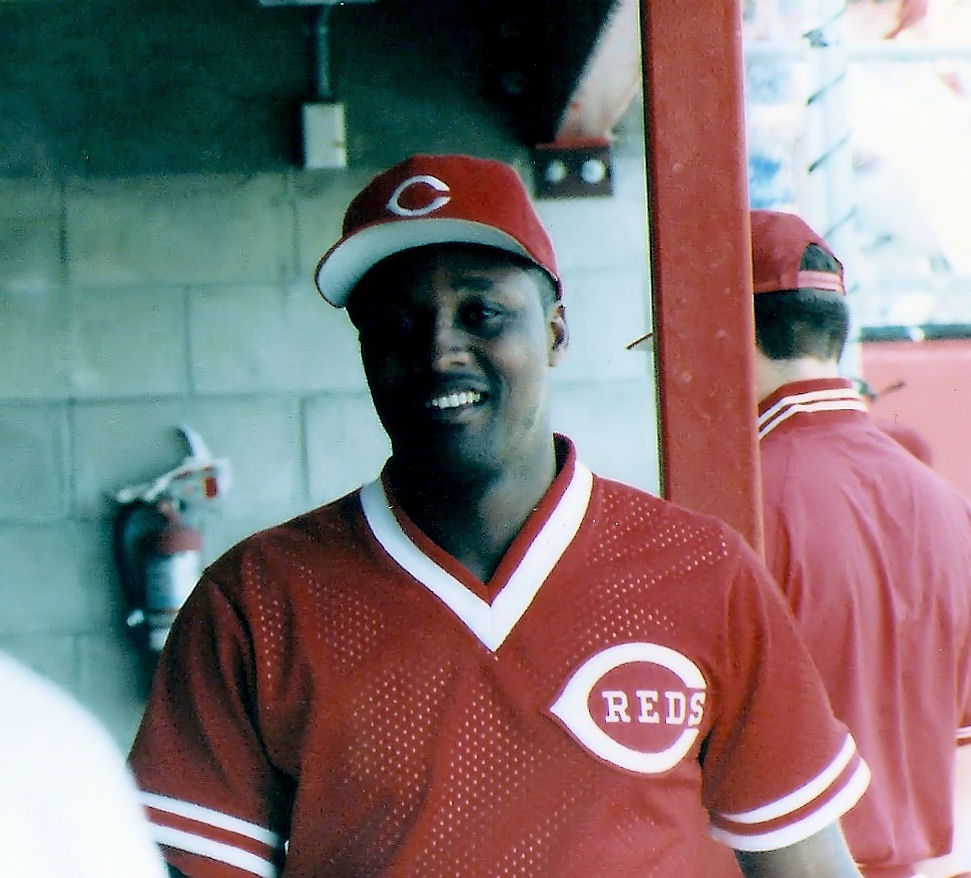
- Center fielder
- Born: December 1, 1961 (age 64); Orangeburg, South Carolina, U.S.
- Batted: Left Threw: Right

MLB debut
- September 1, 1984, for the New York Mets

Last MLB appearance
- October 3, 1992, for the Boston Red Sox

MLB statistics
- Batting average: .239
- Home runs: 19
- Runs batted in: 147
- Stats at Baseball Reference

Teams
- New York Mets (1984); Montreal Expos (1985–1988); Cincinnati Reds (1988–1991); Boston Red Sox (1992)

Career highlights and awards
- World Series champion (1990)

Herman Son Winningham (born December 1, 1961) is an American former professional baseball player. He played all or part of nine seasons in Major League Baseball (MLB), primarily as a center fielder, for the New York Mets, Montreal Expos, Cincinnati Reds, and Boston Red Sox.

== Career ==
Drafted by the New York Mets in the first round of the 1981 Major League Baseball draft, Winningham made his major league debut with the Mets on September 1, 1984. At one time a highly regarded prospect in the New York Mets chain, he was a part of the Gary Carter trade, along with Hubie Brooks, Floyd Youmans, and Mike Fitzgerald. His talents never caught up to his statistics as he was primarily a reserve outfielder for most of his career. His final game was with the Boston Red Sox on October 3, 1992.

Winningham was a member of the Cincinnati Reds team that defeated the Pittsburgh Pirates in the 1990 National League Championship Series and the Oakland Athletics in the World Series. In the last game of the World Series, he replaced an injured Billy Hatcher, went 2-for-3 and scored the winning run. During the 1990 postseason, he batted .364.

In 1995, Winningham was a replacement player during the ongoing strike for Cleveland during spring training.

== Post-playing career ==
Winningham was the head coach of the Orangeburg-Wilkinson High School baseball team in his hometown of Orangeburg. He was suspended in 2013 after allegedly attacking a player on his team in the dugout during a pre-season game. He denied the allegations.
