= 1992 Houston Astros season =

31st season in Major League Baseball for the Houston Astros

1992 Houston Astros
- League: National League
- Division: West
- Ballpark: The Astrodome
- City: Houston, Texas
- Record: 81–81 (.500)
- Divisional place: 4th
- Owners: John McMullen
- General managers: Bill Wood
- Managers: Art Howe
- Television: KTXH; HSE
- Radio: KPRC (AM) (Bill Brown, Milo Hamilton, Larry Dierker, Vince Controneo, Bill Worrell, Enos Cabell); KXYZ (Orlando Sánchez-Diago, Rolando Becerra)

The 1992 Houston Astros season was the 31st season for the Major League Baseball (MLB) franchise located in Houston, Texas, their 28th as the Astros, 31st in the National League (NL), 24th in the NL West division, and 28th at the Astrodome, The Astros entered the season with a 65–97 record and in last place in the NL West, 29 games behind the division-champion and NL pennant-winning Atlanta Braves.

The season began for Houston on April 7 in which they hosted Atlanta, but were defeated, 2–0. Pete Harnisch was the Astros' Opening Day starting pitcher. The Astros' first-round draft pick in the amateur draft was third baseman Phil Nevin, at first overall. Nevin was the Astros' second number-one overall pick, following Floyd Bannister in 1976.

Pitcher Doug Jones and second baseman Craig Biggio represented the Astros at the MLB All-Star Game, This was the third career selection for Jones, and second for Biggio, who was previously selected as a catcher. Broadcaster Milo Hamilton, who began calling games for the Astros in 1985, was recognized for his work with the Ford C. Frick Award by the Baseball Hall of Fame. The Astros also retired the uniform numbers of outfielder José Cruz and right-handed pitcher Mike Scott.

Due to the Republican National Convention being hosted at the Astrodome from August 17–20, the Astros played 26 consecutive road games from July 27 through August 23, going 12–14 on the road trip. The club played in all National League cities except Montreal, New York City, and Pittsburgh.

In their first game back at The Astrodome on August 25 following the 28-day road trip, shortstop Andújar Cedeño hit for the cycle, the fourth in club history. The Astros won 25 of their final 38 games following the long road trip to finish at .500 (81–81), in fourth place in the NL West and 17 games behind the Braves, who repeated as division champions and NL pennant winners. This represented a 16-game improvement from the year prior for Houston. Hence, the 1992 season was the start of the longest period of consistent regular-season success in franchise history, where they finished at .500 or above in each of 15 of 17 seasons through 2008, and made the playoffs six times.

The 1992 Astros became the first Major League team to roster three relief pitchers to each log both 100 innings pitched (IP) and a sub-2.75 earned run average (ERA), by Doug Jones, Joe Boever and Xavier Hernandez. Boever also led the major leagues in games pitched. Following the season, Jones was recognized with The Sporting News NL Fireman of the Year Award. (Note: Awarded annually from 1960–2010 to one relief pitcher from each league, the NL and the American League (AL). Jones was the only Houston Astro recognized with this award.)

== Offseason ==
- December 10, 1991: Kenny Lofton and Dave Rohde were traded by the Astros to the Cleveland Indians for Willie Blair and Eddie Taubensee.
- January 27, 1992: Joe Boever was signed as a free agent by the Astros.
- January 27, 1992: Ernest Riles was signed as a free agent by the Astros.
- January 27, 1992: Denny Walling was signed as a free agent by the Astros.

== Regular season ==
=== Summary ===
==== April—May ====
Opening Day starting lineup
Uniform	Player	Position
7	Craig Biggio	Second baseman
12	Steve Finley	Center fielder
5	Jeff Bagwell	First baseman
28	Pete Incaviglia	Right fielder
11	Ken Caminiti	Third baseman
26	Luis Gonzalez	Left fielder
9	Scott Servais	Catcher
17	Andújar Cedeño	Shortstop
27	Pete Harnisch	Pitcher
Venue: Astrodome • Final: Atlanta 2, Houston 0 Sources:

The Astros launched their 1992 campaign on April 7 by hosting the Atlanta Braves, the previous year's division champions, who pitted reigning NL Cy Young Award winner Tom Glavine against Houston's emerging ace, Pete Harnisch in his first Opening Day start. All-time in Opening Day meetings the Braves were 0–5 against Houston; moreover, in his career, Glavine had never won a start in 13 outings against Houston. However, Glavine was dominant this time, hurling a two-hit shutout as he changed speeds and location to keep the Astros off balance and better Harnish in a 2–0 pitchers' duel in front of 34,761 in attendance. (Note: Harnish had defeated Glavine the prior June 25, 1–0, in a six-hitter at the Astrodome.) Glavine, also the reigning Silver Slugger winner, singled in the top of the eighth inning to start a decisive rally for Atlanta.

On May 8, pitcher Butch Henry became the first major leaguer to attain his first hit by connecting for an inside-the-park home run. The knock was via a Doug Drabek offering at Three Rivers Stadium.

First baseman Jeff Bagwell came off the bench on May 10 to deliver two home runs, including one in an extra innings. He hit the decisive blow in the 10th inning for a 6–4 win over the Pittsburgh Pirates. Bagwell became the first player in club history to enter a contest as a pinch hitter and homer twice, (Note: On September 10, 2019, Martín Maldonado succeeded Bagwell the second Astro to accomplish this feat.) the 27th major leaguer, and first since Steve Balboni on May 23, 1990.

==== June ====
On June 14, outfielder Pete Incaviglia tied the club record with 7 runs batted in (RBI) to lead a 15–7 victory over the San Francisco Giants. He homered twice and hit a run-scoring double. Incaviglia's performance equaled infielder Rafael Ramírez' effort on August 29, 1989, in which the Chicago Cubs came all the way back from a 9–0 deficit to claim victory, 10–9, in the tenth inning.

The Astros' Jones duo of Jimmy and Doug combined to deliver a 1–0 shutout of the Los Angeles Dodgers on June 20. Jimmy tossed the first 8 innings to earn the win, while Doug closed the final three outs for the save. On June 21, Butch Henry and Doug Jones combined on another shutout of Los Angeles, en route to 2–0 win and series sweep. The two contests were the last of 20 consecutive innings in which Houston held Los Angeles scoreless. Incaviglia's two-run home run accounted for all the scoring in the game. On June 28, with the Dodgers hosting the Astros, the Landers earthquake in nearly San Bernardino County struck in the morning of the game. The Astros lost, 8–2. Meanwhile, Ken Caminiti led the Astros with four hits.

==== MLB All-Star Game ====
Closer Doug Jones and second baseman Craig Biggio were selected to the MLB All-Star Game, which was hosted at Jack Murphy Stadium. It was the third career selection for Jones, and second for Biggio, who was also selected to the previous year's All-Star Game as a catcher. Biggio became the first player ever to make the All-Star team at both positions.

==== Rest of July ====
During the bottom of the 12th inning on July 21, Juan Guerrero swatted a Roger Mason offering for a walk-off home run to stun the Pirates, 4–3. This remained the lone home run of Guerrero's major league career. Prior to Guerrero's heroics, the Astros rallied for three runs during the bottom of the ninth, capped by a double to left by Pete Incaviglia and two sacrifice flies. Doug Jones (7–6) earned the victory by closing out the final two frames.

==== August ====
The Republican National Convention was held at the Astrodome from August 17–20; however, a total of three weeks was required or preparation. As a result, the Astros played 26 games in a span of 28 days on the road.

==== Andújar Cedeño's cycle ====
The date of August 25 signified a return for both the Astros and for shortstop Andújar Cedeño. The team returned to The Astrodome following the 28-day road trip, while Cedeño, in his first game back from AAA Tucson after a three-month absence, hit for the cycle, the fourth in club history. With the Astros hosting the St. Louis Cardinals, Cedeño's first hit was a triple, he homered in the seventh inning, doubled in the 11th inning and got the single off Les Smith in the 13th inning. It was the first cycle for an Astros player since Bob Watson accomplished the feat on June 24, 1977. The final cycle hit at the Astrodome, the next Astros cycle after Cedeño was by teammate Jeff Bagwell on July 18, 2001 at Enron Field. (Note: The Astros relocated from the Astrodome following the 1999 season to Enron Field.)

==== Retirement of José Cruz' (25) and Mike Scott's (33) uniform numbers ====
On October 3, 1992, the team officially retired the uniform numbers of outfielder José Cruz and right-handed starting pitcher Mike Scott, also former teammates. Both players were key figures during the Astros' playoff run in 1986, at the time, the club's most recent.

During his career with the Astros, Scott accumulated the most regular-season outings with a game score of 90 or higher in club history (6). (Note: Number of games in a career player meets criteria, playing for HOU, in the regular season, requiring Game Score ≥ 90, sorted by descending instances.) In the 1986 playoffs, Scott tossed one other such outing. (Note: Game 1 of the National League Championship Series.) (Note: Number of games in a career player meets criteria, playing for HOU, in the postseason, requiring Game Score ≥ 90, sorted by descending instances.)

Cruz retired as the franchise leader in numerous categories—many of which would be passed by Biggio—including games played (1,870), runs scored (871), hits (1,937), total bases (2,846), RBI (842), singles (1,384), times on base (2,670), and intentional base on balls (123), among others. Cruz remains the club leader in triples (80), (Note: Through 2025.) walk-off home runs (six), and the NL record-holder with eight bases-loaded triples—all with Houston—and tied for the Major League record with Shano Collins in the American League. (Steve Finley would eventually tie the Major League record.) Through each of Houston's first nine playoff runs, Cruz remained an on-field presence: the first three as a player (1980, 1981, and 1986) and as a coach during the next six (1997–1999, 2001, 2004, and 2005).

==== Performance overview ====
The Astros concluded the 1992 campaign with a final record of 81–81, in fourth place, and 17 games trailing the first-place Atlanta Braves, an overall improvement of 16 wins from the year before. The 1992 season also initiated an era of unprecedented success and consistency for the club, as they continued to assemble a regular season record of .500 or higher on 15 occasions over a span of the next 17 seasons through 2008, while qualifying for six playoff appearances. It was also the first of eight successive campaigns each with a winning percentage of .500 or more through 1999, an achievement ultimately establishing a club record.

The Astros won six games via walk-off home runs, the most of any MLB team in 1992. Two were hit by Bagwell, which tied for second in the majors with three others. (Note: All 43 home runs in 1992—as walk-off or last play of game.)

The 1992 Astros became the first team in Major League history to feature three relief pitchers who each accrued 100 or more innings pitched (IP) while yielding a sub-2.75 earned run average (ERA), who were Doug Jones (111 2/3 IP, 1.85 ERA), Joe Boever (111 1/3, 2.51) and Xavier Hernandez (111, 2.11). The most recent team with two such pitchers were the 1983 New York Mets (eighth overall), and as of 2026, no other team have had as many as two. (Note: Number of players that meet criteria in a season for a team, at least 80% games in relief, in the regular season, requiring Earned Run Average ≤ 2.75 and Innings Pitched ≥ 100, sorted by descending instances.) Jones also converted 36 saves to established a then-club single-season record, surpassing Dave Smith, in 1986 (33). This remained the club record until Billy Wagner converted 39 saves in 1999. (Note: For single seasons, playing for HOU, in the regular season, requiring saves ≥ 25, sorted by ascending season.)

=== League standings ===
==== National League West ====
NL West
Team	W	L	Pct.	GB	Home	Road
Atlanta Braves	98	64	.605	—	51‍–‍30	47‍–‍34
Cincinnati Reds	90	72	.556	8	53‍–‍28	37‍–‍44
San Diego Padres	82	80	.506	16	45‍–‍36	37‍–‍44
Houston Astros	81	81	.500	17	47‍–‍34	34‍–‍47
San Francisco Giants	72	90	.444	26	42‍–‍39	30‍–‍51
Los Angeles Dodgers	63	99	.389	35	37‍–‍44	26‍–‍55

==== Record versus opponents ====
National League

1992 National League record Sources:
Team	ATL	CHC	CIN	HOU	LAD	MON	NYM	PHI	PIT	SD	SF	STL
Atlanta	—	10–2	9–9	13–5	12–6	4–8	7–5	6–6	7–5	13–5	11–7	6–6
Chicago	2–10	—	5–7	8–4	6–6	7–11	9–9	9–9	8–10	5–7	8–4	11–7
Cincinnati	9–9	7–5	—	10–8	11–7	5–7	7–5	7–5	6–6	11–7	10–8	7–5
Houston	5–13	4–8	8–10	—	13–5	8–4	5–7	8–4	6–6	7–11	12–6	5–7
Los Angeles	6–12	6–6	7–11	5–13	—	4–8	5–7	5–7	5–7	9–9	7–11	4–8
Montreal	8–4	11–7	7–5	4–8	8–4	—	12–6	9–9	9–9	8–4	5–7	6–12
New York	5–7	9–9	5–7	7–5	7–5	6–12	—	6–12	4–14	4–8	10–2	9–9
Philadelphia	6-6	9–9	5–7	4–8	7–5	9–9	12–6	—	5–13	3–9	3–9	7–11
Pittsburgh	5–7	10–8	6–6	6–6	7–5	9–9	14–4	13–5	—	5–7	6–6	15–3
San Diego	5–13	7–5	7–11	11–7	9–9	4–8	8–4	9–3	7–5	—	11–7	4–8
San Francisco	7–11	4–8	8–10	6–12	11–7	7–5	2–10	9–3	6–6	7–11	—	5–7
St. Louis	6–6	7–11	5–7	7–5	8–4	12–6	9–9	11–7	3–15	8–4	7–5	—

=== Notable transactions ===
- April 2, 1992: Curt Schilling was traded by the Astros to the Philadelphia Phillies for Jason Grimsley.

=== Roster ===
1992 Houston Astros
Roster
Pitchers: 41 Willie Blair; 54 Joe Boever; 46 Ryan Bowen; 27 Pete Harnisch; 50 Butch Henry; 31 Xavier Hernandez; 23 Doug Jones; 37 Jimmy Jones; 57 Darryl Kile; 56 Rob Mallicoat; 47 Rob Murphy; 29 Al Osuna; 51 Mark Portugal; 38 Shane Reynolds; 49 Rich Scheid; 53 Brian Williams	Catchers: 9 Scott Servais; 6 Eddie Taubensee; 20 Eddie Tucker; Infielders: 5 Jeff Bagwell; 7 Craig Biggio; 11 Ken Caminiti; 1 Casey Candaele; 17 Andújar Cedeño; 19 Juan Guerrero; 16 Rafael Ramírez; 10 Ernest Riles; 15 Eric Yelding	Outfielders: 21 Eric Anthony; 30 Benny Distefano; 12 Steve Finley; 26 Luis Gonzalez; 28 Pete Incaviglia; 24 Chris Jones; 4 Tuffy Rhodes; 22 Mike Simms; 2 Gerald Young; Other batters: 25 Denny Walling	Manager: 18 Art Howe; Coaches: 54 Bob Cluck (pitching); 48 Matt Galante (third base); 42 Rudy Jaramillo (hitting); 14 Ed Ott (bench); 52 Tom Spencer (first base)

== Player stats ==
=== Batting ===
==== Starters by position ====
Note: Pos = Position; G = Games played; AB = At bats; H = Hits; Avg. = Batting average; HR = Home runs; RBI = Runs batted in

Pos	Player	G	AB	H	Avg.	HR	RBI
C	Eddie Taubensee	104	297	66	.222	5	28
1B	Jeff Bagwell	162	586	160	.273	18	96
2B	Craig Biggio	162	613	170	.277	6	39
3B	Ken Caminiti	135	506	149	.294	13	62
SS	Andújar Cedeño	71	220	38	.173	2	13
LF	Luis Gonzalez	122	387	94	.243	10	55
CF	Steve Finley	162	607	177	.292	5	55
RF	Eric Anthony	137	440	105	.239	19	80

==== Other batters ====
Note: G = Games played; AB = At bats; H = Hits; Avg. = Batting average; HR = Home runs; RBI = Runs batted in

Player	G	AB	H	Avg.	HR	RBI
Pete Incaviglia	113	349	93	.266	11	44
Casey Candaele	135	320	68	.213	1	18
Scott Servais	77	205	49	.239	0	15
Rafael Ramírez	73	176	44	.250	1	13
Juan Guerrero	79	125	25	.200	1	14
Gerald Young	74	76	14	.184	0	4
Chris Jones	54	63	12	.190	1	4
Ernie Riles	39	61	16	.262	1	4
Benny Distefano	52	60	14	.233	0	7
Eddie Tucker	20	50	6	.120	0	3
Mike Simms	15	24	6	.250	1	3
Eric Yelding	9	8	2	.250	0	0
Tuffy Rhodes	5	4	0	.000	0	0
Denny Walling	3	3	1	.333	0	0

=== Pitching ===
==== Starting pitchers ====
Note: G = Games pitched; IP = Innings pitched; W = Wins; L = Losses; ERA = Earned run average; SO = Strikeouts

Player	G	IP	W	L	ERA	SO
Pete Harnisch	34	206.2	9	10	3.70	164
Butch Henry	28	165.2	6	9	4.02	96
Jimmy Jones	25	139.1	10	6	4.07	69
Darryl Kile	22	125.1	5	10	3.95	90
Mark Portugal	18	101.1	6	3	2.66	62
Brian Williams	16	96.1	7	6	3.92	54
Ryan Bowen	11	33.2	0	7	10.96	22

==== Other pitchers ====
Note: G = Games pitched; IP = Innings pitched; W = Wins; L = Losses; ERA = Earned run average; SO = Strikeouts

Player	G	IP	W	L	ERA	SO
Willie Blair	29	78.2	5	7	4.00	48
Shane Reynolds	8	25.1	1	3	7.11	10
Rich Scheid	7	12.0	0	1	6.00	8

==== Relief pitchers ====
Note: G = Games pitched; W = Wins; L = Losses; SV = Saves; ERA = Earned run average; SO = Strikeouts

Player	G	W	L	SV	ERA	SO
Doug Jones	80	11	8	36	1.85	93
Joe Boever	81	3	6	2	2.51	67
Xavier Hernandez	77	9	1	7	2.11	96
Al Osuna	66	6	3	0	4.23	37
Rob Murphy	59	3	1	0	4.04	42
Rob Mallicoat	23	0	0	0	7.23	20

== Awards and achievements ==
=== Offensive achievements ===
==== Grand slams ====
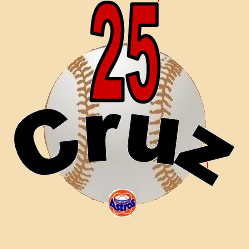
José Cruz's number 25 was retired by the Houston Astros in October 3, 1992.

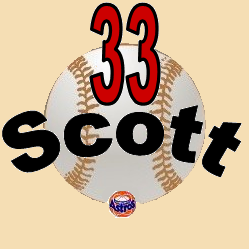
Mike Scott's number 34 was retired by the Houston Astros in October 3, 1992.

No.	Date	Astros batter	Venue	Inning	Pitcher	Opposing team	Box
1	July 27 (Note: 1st MLB grand slam)	Eric Anthony	Atlanta–Fulton County Stadium	11 (Note: Tied score or took lead)	Alejandro Peña	Atlanta Braves	
2	August 31	Eric Anthony	Astrodome	6	Jay Baller	Philadelphia Phillies	

==== Hitting for the cycle ====
Date	Player	H / AB	R	1B	2B	3B	HR	BI	Other	Score	Opponent	Box
August 25	Andújar Cedeño	4-for-5	1	13	11	2	7	2	BB	3–5	St. Louis Cardinals	
Cedeño: 2B (7) • 3B (2) • HR (2) • RBI (7)

=== Career honors ===
Career honors received in 1992
Honor / mention received	Individual	Role	Uni.	Start	Finish	ASG	Bio. / Games	Summ.
Ford C. Frick Award	Milo Hamilton	Broadcaster	—	1985	2012	—	Biography • HOF class	
Houston Astros uniform numbers retired	José Cruz	Outfielder	25	1975	1987	2	1,870 games	
Houston Astros uniform numbers retired	Mike Scott	Starting pitcher	33	1983	1991	3	263 games	
Ref.:

=== Annual awards ===
1992 Houston Astros award winners
Name of award		Recipient	Ref.
Fred Hartman Award for Long and Meritorious Service to Baseball		Bob Green	
Houston-Area Major League Player of the Year	BOS	Roger Clemens	
Houston Astros Most Valuable Player (MVP)		Doug Jones	
MLB All-Star Game	Reserve infielder	Craig Biggio	
MLB All-Star Game	Reserve pitcher	Doug Jones	
National League (NL) Player of the Week	June 28	Ken Caminiti	
National League (NL) Player of the Week	October 4	Steve Finley	
The Sporting News NL Fireman of the Year		Doug Jones (Note: Co-winner with Lee Smith of the St. Louis Cardinals.)	

=== Batting leaders ===
- Games played: 162—tied
  - Jeff Bagwell
  - Craig Biggio
  - Steve Finley
- Plate appearances: Craig Biggio (721)
- Sacrifice flies: Jeff Bagwell (13—led MLB)

=== Pitching leaders ===
- Games finished: Doug Jones (70—led MLB)
- Games played: Joe Boever (81—led MLB)

== Minor league system ==
Level	Team	League	Manager
AAA	Tucson Toros	Pacific Coast League	Bob Skinner
AA	Jackson Generals	Texas League	Rick Sweet
A	Osceola Astros	Florida State League	Sal Butera
A	Burlington Astros	Midwest League	Steve Curry
A	Asheville Tourists	South Atlantic League	Tim Tolman
A-Short Season	Auburn Astros	New York–Penn League	Steve Dillard
Rookie	GCL Astros	Gulf Coast League	Julio Linares

== See also ==
- List of first overall Major League Baseball draft picks
- List of Major League Baseball retired numbers
- List of Major League Baseball players to hit for the cycle
