= 1992 Atlanta Braves season =

Major League Baseball season

1992 Atlanta Braves
- National League champions National League West champions
- League: National League
- Division: West
- Ballpark: Fulton County Stadium
- City: Atlanta
- Record: 98–64 (.605)
- Divisional place: 1st
- Owners: Ted Turner
- General managers: John Schuerholz
- Managers: Bobby Cox
- Television: WTBS; TBS Superstation (Pete Van Wieren, Skip Caray, Don Sutton, Joe Simpson); SportSouth (Ernie Johnson)
- Radio: WGST (Pete Van Wieren, Skip Caray, Don Sutton, Joe Simpson)

The 1992 Atlanta Braves season was the 27th in Atlanta and the 122nd overall. It involved the Braves finishing first in the National League West with a record of 98 wins and 64 losses, clinching their second straight division title.

In the NLCS, the Braves defeated the Pittsburgh Pirates in seven games. In the World Series, Atlanta faced the Toronto Blue Jays, who were making their first appearance in the World Series. The Blue Jays defeated the Braves in six games, becoming the first non-U.S.-based team to win a World Series.

== Offseason ==
- November 20, 1991: Randy St. Claire was released by the Atlanta Braves.
- December 10, 1991: Rico Rossy was traded by the Atlanta Braves to the Kansas City Royals for Bobby Moore.
- December 12, 1991: Otis Nixon was signed as a free agent with the Atlanta Braves.
- January 8, 1992: Steve Lyons signed as a free agent with the Atlanta Braves.

== Regular season ==
=== Opening Day starters ===
- Tom Glavine, pitcher
- Rafael Belliard, shortstop
- Jeff Blauser, second base
- Sid Bream, first base
- Ron Gant, outfield
- David Justice, outfield
- Greg Olson, catcher
- Terry Pendleton, third base
- Deion Sanders, outfield

=== Season standings ===
NL West
Team	W	L	Pct.	GB	Home	Road
Atlanta Braves	98	64	.605	—	51‍–‍30	47‍–‍34
Cincinnati Reds	90	72	.556	8	53‍–‍28	37‍–‍44
San Diego Padres	82	80	.506	16	45‍–‍36	37‍–‍44
Houston Astros	81	81	.500	17	47‍–‍34	34‍–‍47
San Francisco Giants	72	90	.444	26	42‍–‍39	30‍–‍51
Los Angeles Dodgers	63	99	.389	35	37‍–‍44	26‍–‍55

=== Record vs. opponents ===
1992 National League record Sources:
Team	ATL	CHC	CIN	HOU	LAD	MON	NYM	PHI	PIT	SD	SF	STL
Atlanta	—	10–2	9–9	13–5	12–6	4–8	7–5	6–6	7–5	13–5	11–7	6–6
Chicago	2–10	—	5–7	8–4	6–6	7–11	9–9	9–9	8–10	5–7	8–4	11–7
Cincinnati	9–9	7–5	—	10–8	11–7	5–7	7–5	7–5	6–6	11–7	10–8	7–5
Houston	5–13	4–8	8–10	—	13–5	8–4	5–7	8–4	6–6	7–11	12–6	5–7
Los Angeles	6–12	6–6	7–11	5–13	—	4–8	5–7	5–7	5–7	9–9	7–11	4–8
Montreal	8–4	11–7	7–5	4–8	8–4	—	12–6	9–9	9–9	8–4	5–7	6–12
New York	5–7	9–9	5–7	7–5	7–5	6–12	—	6–12	4–14	4–8	10–2	9–9
Philadelphia	6-6	9–9	5–7	4–8	7–5	9–9	12–6	—	5–13	3–9	3–9	7–11
Pittsburgh	5–7	10–8	6–6	6–6	7–5	9–9	14–4	13–5	—	5–7	6–6	15–3
San Diego	5–13	7–5	7–11	11–7	9–9	4–8	8–4	9–3	7–5	—	11–7	4–8
San Francisco	7–11	4–8	8–10	6–12	11–7	7–5	2–10	9–3	6–6	7–11	—	5–7
St. Louis	6–6	7–11	5–7	7–5	8–4	12–6	9–9	11–7	3–15	8–4	7–5	—

=== Notable transactions ===
- April 30, 1992: Steve Lyons was released by the Atlanta Braves.
- July 17, 1992: Randall Simon was signed by the Atlanta Braves as an amateur free agent.
- July 21, 1992: Mark Davis was traded by the Kansas City Royals to the Atlanta Braves for Juan Berenguer.
- August 30, 1992: Jeff Reardon was traded by the Boston Red Sox to the Atlanta Braves for Nate Minchey and Sean Ross (minors).

=== Roster ===
1992 Atlanta Braves
Roster
Pitchers: 33 Steve Avery; 48 Juan Berenguer; 36 Mike Bielecki; 51 Pedro Borbón, Jr.; 48 Mark Davis; 40 Marvin Freeman; 47 Tom Glavine; 32 Charlie Leibrandt; 50 Kent Mercker; 38 David Nied; 26 Alejandro Peña; 31 Jeff Reardon; 42 Armando Reynoso; 51 Ben Rivera; 25 Pete Smith; 29 John Smoltz; 46 Randy St. Claire; 30 Mike Stanton; 43 Mark Wohlers	Catchers: 11 Damon Berryhill; 19 Francisco Cabrera; 8 Javy López; 10 Greg Olson; 31 Jerry Willard; Infielders: 2 Rafael Belliard; 4 Jeff Blauser; 12 Sid Bream; 45 Vinny Castilla; 14 Brian Hunter; 18 Ryan Klesko; 20 Mark Lemke; 9 Terry Pendleton; 15 Jeff Treadway	Outfielders: 5 Ron Gant; 16 Tommy Gregg; 23 David Justice; 18 Steve Lyons; 7 Melvin Nieves; 1 Otis Nixon; 24 Deion Sanders; 27 Lonnie Smith	Manager: 6 Bobby Cox; Coaches: 37 Jim Beauchamp (bench); 39 Pat Corrales (first base); 59 Frank Fultz (strength and conditioning); 28 Clarence Jones (hitting); 54 Leo Mazzone (pitching); 22 Jimy Williams (third base); 52 Ned Yost (bullpen)

== Game log ==
Legend
Braves win	Braves loss	All-Star Game	Game postponed

1992 Regular Season Game Log (98–64)
April (11–11)

#	Date	Opponent	Score	Win	Loss	Save	Attendance	Record
1	April 7	@ Astros	2–0	Glavine (1-0)	Harnisch (0-1)		25,318	1-0
2	April 8	@ Astros	3–1	Smoltz (1-0)	Kile (0-1)	Peña (1)	10,014	2-0
3	April 9	Giants	4–11	Heredia (1-0)	Avery (0-1)		43,622	2-1
4	April 10	Giants	5–3	Leibrandt (1-0)	Burba (0-1)	Stanton (1)	37,577	3-1
5	April 11	Giants	0–3	Swift (2-0)	Bielecki (0-1)		44,550	3-2
6	April 12	Giants	6–2	Glavine (2-0)	Downs (0-2)		43,055	4-2
7	April 13	@ Reds	4–5	Belcher (1-1)	Smoltz (1-1)	Charlton (4)	23,048	4-3
8	April 14	@ Reds	4–5	Bankhead (1-0)	Freeman (0-1)		19,466	4-4
9	April 15	@ Reds	1–3	Hammond (2-0)	Leibrandt (1-1)	Charlton (5)	22,730	4-5
10	April 16	@ Dodgers	3–0	Bielecki (1-1)	Gross (0-1)		40,089	5-5
11	April 17	@ Dodgers	5–7	McDowell (1-2)	Peña (0-1)		47,771	5-6
12	April 18	@ Dodgers	3–7	McDowell (2-2)	Stanton (0-1)		46,851	5-7
13	April 19	@ Dodgers	2–4	Candiotti (3-0)	Avery (0-2)		37,145	5-8
14	April 20	@ Padres	10–4	Freeman (1-1)	Lefferts (1-2)		20,002	6-8
15	April 21	@ Padres	2–4	Rodriguez (1-1)	Bielecki (1-2)	Myers (4)	26,468	6-9
16	April 22	@ Padres	4–9	Hurst (1-1)	Glavine (2-1)		18,581	6-10
17	April 24	Astros	2–4	Kile (2-1)	Smoltz (1-2)	D. Jones (6)	40,666	6-11
18	April 25	Astros	2–0	Avery (1-2)	Portugal (2-1)		42,709	7-11
19	April 26	Astros	3–2	Freeman (2-1)	Harnisch (1-3)	Peña (2)	37,137	8-11
20	April 27	Cubs	5–0	Glavine (3-1)	Boskie (3-1)		25,932	9-11
21	April 28	Cubs	1–0	Leibrandt (2-1)	Castillo (0-2)	Peña (3)	28,765	10-11
22	April 29	Cubs	8–0	Smoltz (2-2)	Jackson (0-4)		33,144	11-11

May (12–16)

#	Date	Opponent	Score	Win	Loss	Save	Attendance	Record
23	May 1	Mets	7–8	Burke (1-0)	Berenguer (0-1)	Franco (5)	31,637	11-12
24	May 2	Mets	3–0	Glavine (4-1)	Gooden (2-2)		38,115	12-12
25	May 3	Mets	0–7	Cone (3-1)	Leibrandt (2-2)		41,282	12-13
26	May 4	@ Cubs	6–1	Smoltz (3-2)	Castillo (0-3)		22,836	13-13
27	May 5	@ Cubs	3–4 (10)	McElroy (2-0)	Peña (0-2)		14,408	13-14
28	May 6	@ Pirates	3–4 (16)	Patterson (2-0)	Rivera (0-1)		18,686	13-15
29	May 7	@ Pirates	4–2	Glavine (5-1)	Neagle (1-1)	Stanton (2)	11,689	14-15
30	May 8	@ Cardinals	2–1	Leibrandt (3-2)	Tewksbury (3-1)	Freeman (1)	45,110	15-15
31	May 9	@ Cardinals	11–12	Pérez (4-0)	Freeman (2-2)	Smith (10)	40,417	15-16
32	May 10	@ Cardinals	5–6	Agosto (2-2)	Peña (0-3)		28,491	15-17
33	May 11	@ Cardinals	3–8	DeLeón (2-2)	Avery (1-3)		26,005	15-18
34	May 12	Pirates	4–2	Glavine (6-1)	Tomlin (4-2)	Freeman (2)	38,949	16-18
35	May 13	Pirates	10–11	Belinda (2-0)	Peña (0-4)		24,872	16-19
36	May 14	Pirates	3–4	Palacios (2-0)	Smoltz (3-3)	Mason (4)	32,303	16-20
37	May 15	Expos	4–2	Mercker (1-0)	Nabholz (2-3)	Stanton (3)	37,551	17-20
38	May 16	Expos	1–7	Martínez (3-4)	Avery (1-4)	Rojas (4)	40,504	17-21
39	May 17	Expos	4–5	Hill (4-2)	Glavine (6-2)	Wetteland (6)	41,480	17-22
40	May 18	Cardinals	5–1	Leibrandt (4-2)	Osborne (4-2)		23,546	18-22
41	May 19	Cardinals	2–7	Tewksbury (5-1)	Smoltz (3-4)		26,012	18-23
42	May 20	Cardinals	6–3	Avery (2-4)	Cormier (0-4)		22,610	19-23
43	May 22	@ Expos	1–7	Martínez (3-4)	Glavine (6-3)		20,313	19-24
44	May 23	@ Expos	6–7	Fassero (2-2)	Stanton (0-2)	Wetteland (7)	15,918	19-25
45	May 24	@ Expos	2–1	Smoltz (4-4)	Gardner (3-3)		27,682	20-25
46	May 25	@ Phillies	1–4	Mulholland (5-3)	Avery (2-5)	Williams (7)	18,343	20-26
47	May 26	@ Phillies	2–5	Robinson (1-0)	Bielecki (1-3)	Williams (8)	11,295	20-27
48	May 27	@ Phillies	9–3	Glavine (7-3)	Brantley (2-3)		23,695	21-27
49	May 29	@ Mets	5–1	Smoltz (5-4)	Gooden (4-5)		31,866	22-27
50	May 30	@ Mets	6–1	Avery (3-5)	Cone (5-3)		46,261	23-27

June (19–6)

#	Date	Opponent	Score	Win	Loss	Save	Attendance	Record
51	June 1	Phillies	7–6	Glavine (8-3)	Brantley (2-4)	Wohlers (1)	25,647	24-27
52	June 2	Phillies	5–3	Stanton (1-2)	Williams (2-2)		27,855	25-27
53	June 3	Phillies	1–4	Schilling (4-3)	Smoltz (5-5)	Williams (9)	19,357	25-28
54	June 5	@ Padres	3–2	Berenguer (1-1)	Lefferts (6-4)	Wohlers (2)	21,781	26-28
55	June 6	@ Padres	5–1	Glavine (9-3)	Benes (5-5)		54,046	27-28
56	June 7	@ Padres	9–4	Smoltz (6-5)	Seminara (0-1)		18,924	28-28
57	June 8	@ Dodgers	4–2	Leibrandt (5-2)	Martínez (3-3)	Berenguer (1)	29,799	29-28
58	June 9	@ Dodgers	2–3	Hershiser (6-3)	Stanton (1-3)	McDowell (9)	33,387	29-29
59	June 10	@ Dodgers	2–1	Avery (4-5)	Gross (3-6)	Stanton (4)	28,241	30-29
60	June 12	Padres	6–4	Berenguer (2-1)	Maddux (0-1)	Stanton (5)	39,884	31-29
61	June 13	Padres	4–2	Smoltz (7-5)	Seminara (0-2)		38,149	32-29
62	June 14	Padres	4–2	Leibrandt (6-2)	Hurst (6-5)	Wohlers (3)	40,790	33-29
63	June 15	Dodgers	2–0	Avery (5-5)	Hershiser (6-4)		43,239	34-29
64	June 16	Dodgers	9–8	Berenguer (3-1)	Candelaria (0-1)		42,523	35-29
65	June 17	Dodgers	4–3	Glavine (10-3)	Ojeda (3-4)		40,957	36-29
66	June 18	Reds	5–7 (10)	Bankhead (8-1)	Stanton (1-4)	Charlton (16)	47,896	36-30
67	June 19	Reds	3–2 (10)	Mercker (2-0)	Henry (1-2)		43,042	37-30
68	June 20	Reds	2–1	Avery (6-5)	Browning (5-5)	Mercker (1)	44,636	38-30
69	June 21	Reds	2–0	Bielecki (2-3)	Rijo (3-6)	Mercker (2)	42,831	39-30
70	June 23	Giants	7–0	Glavine (11-3)	Burkett (5-4)		39,890	40-30
71	June 24	Giants	5–0	Smoltz (8-5)	Wilson (5-7)		39,016	41-30
72	June 26	@ Reds	4–7	Browning (6-5)	Avery (6-6)		44,431	41-31
73	June 27	@ Reds	3–12	Rijo (4-6)	Leibrandt (6-3)		43,883	41-32
74	June 28	@ Reds	5–6	Charlton (3-0)	Wohlers (0-1)		37,581	41-33
75	June 30	@ Giants	4–3	Smoltz (9-5)	Wilson (5-8)		16,299	42-33

July (16–9)

#	Date	Opponent	Score	Win	Loss	Save	Attendance	Record
76	July 1	@ Giants	1–2	Black (5-2)	Avery (6-7)	Beck (5)	17,966	42-34
77	July 3	Cubs	3–0	Glavine (12-3)	Boskie (5-5)		43,803	43-34
78	July 4	Cubs	4–2	Leibrandt (7-3)	Jackson (4-9)	Mercker (3)	42,106	44-34
79	July 5	Cubs	0–8	Maddux (10-7)	Smoltz (9-6)		42,545	44-35
80	July 6	Mets	1–3	Cone (8-4)	Freeman (2-3)	Guetterman (1)	39,444	44-36
81	July 7	Mets	4–5	Fernandez (7-7)	Bielecki (2-4)	Young (2)	39,490	44-37
82	July 8	Mets	2–1	Glavine (13-3)	Whitehurst (1-4)	Peña (4)	37,721	45-37
83	July 9	@ Cubs	2–0 (12)	Stanton (2-4)	Bullinger (0-2)	Peña (5)	32,816	46-37
84	July 10	@ Cubs	4–0	Smoltz (10-6)	Maddux (10-8)		35,067	47-37
85	July 11	@ Cubs	3–1	Avery (7-7)	Scanlan (2-5)	Peña (6)	36,541	48-37
86	July 12	@ Cubs	7–4 (10)	Mercker (3-0)	Assenmacher (2-2)	Peña (7)	28,272	49-37
87	July 16	@ Astros	4–2	Avery (8-7)	Williams (3-1)	Peña (8)	19,383	50-37
88	July 17	@ Astros	5–0	Smoltz (11-6)	Harnisch (3-8)		24,691	51-37
89	July 18	@ Astros	3–0	Glavine (14-3)	J. Jones (4-4)	Peña (9)	24,086	52-37
90	July 19	@ Astros	3–2 (10)	Freeman (3-3)	Hernandez (5-1)	Peña (10)	27,270	53-37
91	July 21	@ Cardinals	9–7 (12)	Peña (1-4)	Perez (6-2)		39,561	54-37
92	July 22	@ Cardinals	2–0	Smoltz (12-6)	Olivares (6-5)	Mercker (4)	34,605	55-37
93	July 24	Pirates	4–3	Glavine (15-3)	Walk (3-4)	Peña (11)	44,965	56-37
94	July 25	Pirates	1–0	Leibrandt (8-3)	Jackson (4-10)	Mercker (5)	44,567	57-37
95	July 26	Pirates	4–5	Belinda (5-2)	Wohlers (0-2)		43,714	57-38
96	July 27	Astros	1–5 (11)	D. Jones (8-7)	Peña (1-5)		38,729	57-39
97	July 28	Astros	5–7	Harnisch (4-8)	Freeman (3-4)	D. Jones (21)	40,457	57-40
98	July 29	Astros	5–3	Glavine (16-3)	Blair (2-6)	Peña (12)	39,076	58-40
99	July 30	@ Giants	0–5	Burkett (7-6)	Leibrandt (8-4)		14,313	58-41
100	July 31	@ Giants	3–4	Jackson (5-3)	Mercker (3-1)		21,025	58-42

August (19–10)

#	Date	Opponent	Score	Win	Loss	Save	Attendance	Record
101	August 1	@ Giants	5–3	Smoltz (13-6)	Black (9-4)		31,986	59-42
102	August 2	@ Giants	3–0	P. Smith (1-0)	Swift (8-3)	Peña (13)	--	60-42
103	August 2	@ Giants	8–5	Reynoso (1-0)	Hickerson (4-2)	Freeman (3)	36,302	61-42
104	August 4	Reds	7–5	Freeman (4-4)	Charlton (3-1)		45,155	62-42
105	August 5	Reds	5–1	Avery (9-7)	Belcher (9-10)		44,480	63-42
106	August 6	Reds	5–3	Smoltz (14-6)	Swindell (10-5)		44,768	64-42
107	August 7	Dodgers	6–2	Leibrandt (9-4)	Gross (5-11)		43,822	65=42
108	August 8	Dodgers	12–2	P. Smith (2-0)	Candiotti (9-10)		43,116	66-42
109	August 9	Dodgers	10–3	Glavine (17-3)	Hershiser (8-10)		43,659	67-42
110	August 10	Dodgers	3–5	Martínez (8-8)	Avery (9-8)	Gott (5)	43,368	67-43
111	August 11	Padres	4–8	Hurst (12-6)	Smoltz (14-7)	Maddux (5)	43,927	67-44
112	August 13	Padres	4–3	Davis (1-0)	Andersen (1-1)		38,319	68-44
113	August 14	@ Pirates	15–0	Glavine (18-3)	Smith (8-8)		38,595	69-44
114	August 15	@ Pirates	7–5	Avery (10-8)	Jackson (5-11)	Peña (14)	38,808	70-44
115	August 16	@ Pirates	2–4	Wakefield (3-0)	Smoltz (14-8)		35,199	70-45
116	August 17	@ Pirates	5–4 (10)	Freeman (5-4)	Patterson (5-2)	Peña (15)	38,062	71-45
117	August 18	@ Expos	5–1	Leibrandt (10-4)	Hill (13-6)		32,920	72-45
118	August 19	@ Expos	4–2	Glavine (19-3)	Nabholz (8-9)	Stanton (6)	27,235	73-45
119	August 20	@ Expos	2–3	Fassero (5-5)	Peña (1-6)		23,896	73-46
120	August 21	Cardinals	2–5 (10)	Pérez (7-2)	Mercker (3-2)	Smith (32)	33,835	73-47
121	August 22	Cardinals	3–2	P. Smith (3-0)	Clark (2-7)		45,175	74-47
122	August 23	Cardinals	3–8	Olivares (7-8)	Leibrandt (10-5)		40,200	74-48
123	August 25	Expos	0–6	Nabholz (9-9)	Glavine (19-4)		38,455	74-49
124	August 26	Expos	4–5	Martínez (14-10)	Avery (10-9)	Wetteland (29)	36,275	74-50
125	August 28	@ Phillies	3–7	Mulholland (12-8)	Smoltz (14-9)		22,267	74-51
126	August 29	@ Phillies	7–6	Leibrandt (11-5)	Schilling (11-9)	Mercker (6)	27,760	75-51
127	August 30	@ Phillies	2–10	Rivera (4-3)	Glavine (19-5)		32,084	75-52
128	August 31	@ Mets	8–6 (14)	Wohlers (1-2)	Guetterman (2-3)	Stanton (7)	--	76-52
129	August 31	@ Mets	7–5	P. Smith (4-0)	Birkbeck (0-1)	Reardon (1)	24,392	77-52

September (17–11)

#	Date	Opponent	Score	Win	Loss	Save	Attendance	Record
130	September 1	@ Mets	4–1	Nied (1-0)	Whitehurst (2-8)	Reardon (2)	21,539	78-52
131	September 2	@ Mets	5–6	Schourek (4-6)	Smoltz (14-10)	Young (12)	17,962	78-53
132	September 3	Expos	2–11	Barnes (5-5)	Leibrandt (11-6)	Bottenfield (1)	27,824	78-54
133	September 4	Phillies	1–2	Schilling (12-9)	Glavine (19-6)	Williams (23)	40,768	78-55
134	September 5	Phillies	6–5	Reardon (1-0)	Williams (3-7)		33,755	79-55
135	September 6	Phillies	4–3	Reardon (2-0)	Hartley (5-6)		42,097	80-55
136	September 7	Dodgers	7–1	Smoltz (15-10)	Astacio (2-3)		40,322	81-55
137	September 8	Dodgers	7–5	Freeman (6-4)	Crews (0-2)	Reardon (3)	36,970	82-55
138	September 9	Reds	12–7	Glavine (20-6)	Belcher (11-14)		41,809	83-55
139	September 10	Reds	3–2	Stanton (3-4)	Bankhead (9-4)		41,265	84-55
140	September 11	@ Astros	7–0	P. Smith (5-0)	Kile (3-10)		13,554	85-55
141	September 12	@ Astros	9–3	Nied (2-0)	Williams (7-6)		18,313	86-55
142	September 13	@ Astros	9–2	Leibrandt (12-6)	Harnisch (7-10)		14,239	87-55
143	September 15	@ Reds	2–4	Belcher (12-14)	Avery (10-10)	Dibble (20)	22,583	87-56
144	September 16	@ Reds	3–2	Stanton (4-4)	Ruskin (4-2)	Wohlers (4)	22,595	88-56
145	September 17	@ Reds	2–3	Rijo (13-9)	Smoltz (15-11)	Foster (1)	24,402	88-57
146	September 18	Astros	3–13	Harnisch (8-10)	Leibrandt (12-7)		41,677	88-58
147	September 19	Astros	2–3 (12)	D. Jones (10-8)	Freeman (6-5)		41,945	88-59
148	September 20	Astros	16–1	Avery (11-10)	Bowen (0-6)		40,493	89-59
149	September 21	@ Dodgers	4–2	P. Smith (6-0)	Hershiser (10-14)	Stanton (8)	19,822	90-59
150	September 22	@ Dodgers	1–4	Candiotti (11-14)	Smoltz (15-12)		21,122	90-60
151	September 23	@ Giants	7–0	Leibrandt (13-7)	Black (10-11)		13,035	91-60
152	September 24	@ Giants	0–4	Brantley (6-7)	Glavine (20-7)		12,573	91-61
153	September 25	@ Padres	0–1	Harris (3-8)	Avery (11-11)	Myers (37)	38,866	91-62
154	September 26	@ Padres	2–1 (10)	Stanton (5-4)	Rodriguez (6-3)		24,574	92-62
155	September 27	@ Padres	2–1 (10)	Reardon (3-0)	Myers (2-5)		16,884	93-62
156	September 29	Giants	6–0	Leibrandt (14-7)	Black (10-12)		40,860	94-62
157	September 30	Giants	0–1	Brantley (7-7)	Glavine (20-8)	Beck (16)	38,096	94-63

October (4–1)

#	Date	Opponent	Score	Win	Loss	Save	Attendance	Record
158	October 1	Giants	6–5 (10)	Freeman (7-5)	Jackson (6-6)		37,359	95-63
159	October 2	Padres	4–1	Nied (3-0)	Benes (13-14)		--	96-63
160	October 2	Padres	7–2	P. Smith (7-0)	Deshaies (4-7)		41,075	97-63
161	October 3	Padres	1–0 (6)	Leibrandt (15-7)	Maddux (2-2)	Reynoso (1)	26,393	98-63
162	October 4	Padres	3–4 (12)	Myers (3-6)	Borbón (0-1)		31,791	98-64

1992 Playoff Game Log
1992 National League Championship Series vs. Pittsburgh Pirates – Atlanta wins series 4–3

#	Date	Opponent	Score	Win	Loss	Save	Attendance	Series
1	October 6	Pirates	5–1	Smoltz (1-0)	Drabek (0-1)		51,971	1-0
2	October 7	Pirates	13–5	Avery (1-0)	Jackson (0-1)		51,975	2-0
3	October 9	@ Pirates	2–3	Wakefield (1-0)	Glavine (0-1)		56,610	2-1
4	October 10	@ Pirates	6–4	Smoltz (2-0)	Drabek (0-2)	Reardon (1)	57,164	3-1
5	October 11	@ Pirates	1–7	Walk (1-0)	Avery (1-1)		52,929	3-2
6	October 13	Pirates	4–13	Wakefield (2-0)	Glavine (0-2)		51,975	3-3
7	October 14	Pirates	3–2	Reardon (1-0)	Drabek (0-3)		51,975	4-3

1992 World Series vs. Toronto Blue Jays – Toronto wins series 4–2

#	Date	Opponent	Score	Win	Loss	Save	Attendance	Series
1	October 17	Blue Jays	3–1	Glavine (1-2)	Morris (0-2)		51,763	1-0
2	October 18	Blue Jays	4–5	Ward (2-0)	Reardon (1-1)	Henke (4)	51,763	1-1
3	October 20	@ Blue Jays	2–3	Ward (3-0)	Avery (1-2)		51,813	1-2
4	October 21	@ Blue Jays	1–2	Key (1-0)	Glavine (1-3)	Henke (5)	52,090	1-3
5	October 22	@ Blue Jays	7–2	Smoltz (3-0)	Morris (0-3)	Stanton (1)	52,268	2-3
6	October 24	Blue Jays	3–4 (11)	Key (2-0)	Leibrandt (0-1)	Timlin (1)	51,763	2-4

== Player stats ==
=== Batting ===
= Indicates team leader

==== Starters by position ====
Note: Pos = Position; G = Games played; AB = At bats; H = Hits; Avg. = Batting average; HR = Home runs; RBI = Runs batted in

Pos	Player	G	AB	H	Avg.	HR	RBI
C	Greg Olson	95	302	72	.238	3	27
1B	Sid Bream	125	372	97	.261	10	61
2B	Mark Lemke	155	427	97	.227	6	26
3B	Terry Pendleton	160	640	199	.311	21	105
SS	Rafael Belliard	144	285	60	.211	0	14
LF	Ron Gant	153	544	141	.259	17	80
CF	Otis Nixon	120	456	134	.294	2	22
RF	David Justice	144	484	124	.256	21	72

==== Other batters ====
Note: G = Games played; AB = At bats; H = Hits; Avg. = Batting average; HR = Home runs; RBI = Runs batted in

Player	G	AB	H	Avg.	HR	RBI
Jeff Blauser	123	343	90	.262	14	46
Damon Berryhill	101	307	70	.228	10	43
Deion Sanders	97	303	92	.304	8	28
Brian Hunter	102	238	57	.239	14	41
Lonnie Smith	84	158	39	.247	6	33
Jeff Treadway	61	126	28	.222	0	5
Jerry Willard	26	23	8	.348	2	7
Melvin Nieves	12	19	4	.211	0	1
Tommy Gregg	18	19	5	.263	1	1
Vinny Castilla	9	16	4	.250	0	1
Javy López	9	16	6	.375	0	2
Ryan Klesko	13	14	0	.000	0	1
Steve Lyons	11	14	1	.071	0	1
Francisco Cabrera	12	10	3	.300	2	3

=== Pitching ===
= Indicates league leader

==== Starting pitchers ====
Note: G = Games pitched; IP = Innings pitched; W = Wins; L = Losses; ERA = Earned run average; SO = Strikeouts

Player	G	IP	W	L	ERA	SO
John Smoltz	35	246.2	15	12	2.85	215
Steve Avery	35	233.2	11	11	3.20	129
Tom Glavine	33	225.0	20	8	2.76	129
Charlie Leibrandt	32	193.0	15	7	3.36	104
Mike Bielecki	19	80.2	2	4	2.57	62
Pete Smith	12	79.0	7	0	2.05	43

==== Other pitchers ====
Note: G = Games pitched; IP = Innings pitched; W = Wins; L = Losses; ERA = Earned run average; SO = Strikeouts

Player	G	IP	W	L	ERA	SO
David Nied	6	23.0	3	0	1.17	19
Armando Reynoso	3	7.2	1	0	4.70	2

==== Relief pitchers ====
Note: G = Games pitched; W = Wins; L = Losses; SV = Saves; ERA = Earned run average; SO = Strikeouts

Player	G	W	L	SV	ERA	SO
Alejandro Pena	41	1	6	15	4.07	34
Mike Stanton	65	5	4	8	4.10	44
Marvin Freeman	58	7	5	3	3.22	41
Kent Mercker	53	3	2	6	3.42	49
Mark Wohlers	32	1	2	4	2.55	17
Juan Berenguer	28	3	1	1	5.13	19
Mark Davis	14	1	0	0	7.02	15
Jeff Reardon	14	3	0	3	1.15	7
Randy St.Claire	10	0	0	0	5.87	7
Ben Rivera	8	0	1	0	4.70	11
Pedro Borbon, Jr.	2	0	1	0	6.75	1

== Postseason ==
=== National League Championship Series ===
==== Game 1 ====
October 6: Atlanta–Fulton County Stadium, Atlanta

Team	1	2	3	4	5	6	7	8	9	R	H	E
Pittsburgh	0	0	0	0	0	0	0	1	0	1	5	1
Atlanta	0	1	0	2	1	0	1	0	X	5	8	0
W: John Smoltz (1–0) L: Doug Drabek (0–1) S: None
HR: PIT – José Lind (1) ATL – Jeff Blauser (1)
Pitchers: PIT – Drabek (4 2/3), Patterson (1 1/3), Neagle (1), Cox (1) ATL – Smoltz (8), Stanton (1)
Attendance: 51,971 Time: 3:20

==== Game 2 ====
October 7: Atlanta–Fulton County Stadium, Atlanta

Team	1	2	3	4	5	6	7	8	9	R	H	E
Pittsburgh	0	0	0	0	0	0	4	1	0	5	7	0
Atlanta	0	4	0	0	4	0	5	0	X	13	14	0
W: Steve Avery (1–0) L: Danny Jackson (0–1) S: None
HR: PIT – none ATL – Ron Gant (1)
Pitchers: PIT – Jackson (1 2/3), Mason (1/3), Walk (2 2/3), Tomlin (1 1/3), Neagle (2/3), Patterson (1/3), Belinda (1) ATL – Avery (6 1/3), Freeman (1/3), Stanton (1/3), Wohlers (1), Reardon (1)
Attendance: 51,975 Time: 3:20

==== Game 3 ====
October 9: Three Rivers Stadium, Pittsburgh, Pennsylvania

Team	1	2	3	4	5	6	7	8	9	R	H	E
Atlanta	0	0	0	1	0	0	1	0	0	2	5	0
Pittsburgh	0	0	0	0	1	1	1	0	X	3	8	1
W: Tim Wakefield (1–0) L: Tom Glavine (0–1) S: None
HR: ATL – Sid Bream (1), Ron Gant (2) PIT – Don Slaught (1)
Pitchers: ATL – Glavine (6 1/3), Stanton (2/3), Wohlers (1) PIT – Wakefield (9)
Attendance: 56,610 Time: 2:37

==== Game 4 ====
October 10: Three Rivers Stadium, Pittsburgh, Pennsylvania

Team	1	2	3	4	5	6	7	8	9	R	H	E
Atlanta	0	2	0	0	2	2	0	0	0	6	11	1
Pittsburgh	0	2	1	0	0	0	1	0	0	4	6	1
W: John Smoltz (2–0) L: Doug Drabek (0–2) S: Jeff Reardon (1)
HR: ATL – none PIT – none
Pitchers: ATL – Smoltz (6 1/3), Stanton (1 2/3), Reardon (1) PIT – Drabek (4 1/3), Tomlin (1 1/3), Cox (1/3), Mason (3)
Attendance: 57,164 Time: 3:10

==== Game 5 ====
October 11: Three Rivers Stadium, Pittsburgh, Pennsylvania

Team	1	2	3	4	5	6	7	8	9	R	H	E
Atlanta	0	0	0	0	0	0	0	1	0	1	3	0
Pittsburgh	4	0	1	0	0	1	1	0	X	7	13	0
W: Bob Walk (1–0) L: Steve Avery (1–1) S: none
HR: ATL – none PIT – none
Pitchers: ATL – Avery (1/3), P. Smith (3 2/3), Leibrandt (1 2/3), Freeman (1 1/3), Mercker (1) PIT – Walk (9)
Attendance: 52,929 Time: 2:52

==== Game 6 ====
October 13: Atlanta–Fulton County Stadium, Atlanta

Team	1	2	3	4	5	6	7	8	9	R	H	E
Pittsburgh	0	8	0	0	4	1	0	0	0	13	13	1
Atlanta	0	0	0	1	0	0	1	0	2	4	9	1
W: Tim Wakefield (2–0) L: Tom Glavine (0–2) S: none
HR: PIT – Barry Bonds (1), Jay Bell (1), Lloyd McClendon (1) ATL – David Justice (1,2)
Pitchers: PIT – Wakefield (9) ATL – Glavine (1), Leibrandt (3), Freeman (2), Mercker (2) Wohlers (1)
Attendance: 51,975 Time: 2:50

==== Game 7 ====
October 14: Atlanta–Fulton County Stadium, Atlanta

Team	1	2	3	4	5	6	7	8	9	R	H	E
Pittsburgh	1	0	0	0	0	1	0	0	0	2	7	1
Atlanta	0	0	0	0	0	0	0	0	3	3	7	0
W: Jeff Reardon (1–0) L: Doug Drabek (0–3) S: none
HR: PIT – none ATL – none
Pitchers: PIT – Drabek (8), Belinda (2/3) ATL – Smoltz (6), Stanton (2/3), P. Smith (0), Avery (1 1/3), Reardon (1)
Attendance: 51,975 Time: 3:22

=== World Series ===
==== Game 1 ====
October 17, 1992, at Atlanta–Fulton County Stadium in Atlanta

Team	1	2	3	4	5	6	7	8	9	R	H	E
Toronto	0	0	0	1	0	0	0	0	0	1	4	0
Atlanta	0	0	0	0	0	3	0	0	X	3	4	0
W: Tom Glavine (1–0) L: Jack Morris (0–1)
HR: TOR – Joe Carter (1) ATL – Damon Berryhill (1)

==== Game 2 ====
October 18, 1992, at Atlanta–Fulton County Stadium in Atlanta

Team	1	2	3	4	5	6	7	8	9	R	H	E
Toronto	0	0	0	0	2	0	0	1	2	5	9	2
Atlanta	0	1	0	1	2	0	0	0	0	4	5	1
W: Duane Ward (1–0) L: Jeff Reardon (0–1) S: Tom Henke (1)
HR: TOR – Ed Sprague (1)

==== Game 3 ====
October 20, 1992, at SkyDome in Toronto, Ontario

Team	1	2	3	4	5	6	7	8	9	R	H	E
Atlanta	0	0	0	0	0	1	0	1	0	2	9	0
Toronto	0	0	0	1	0	0	0	1	1	3	6	1
W: Duane Ward (2–0) L: Steve Avery (0–1)
HR: TOR – Joe Carter (2), Kelly Gruber (1)

==== Game 4 ====
October 21, 1992, at SkyDome in Toronto, Ontario

Team	1	2	3	4	5	6	7	8	9	R	H	E
Atlanta	0	0	0	0	0	0	0	1	0	1	5	0
Toronto	0	0	1	0	0	0	1	0	0	2	6	0
W: Jimmy Key (1–0) L: Tom Glavine (1–1) S: Tom Henke (2)
HR: TOR – Pat Borders (1)

==== Game 5 ====
October 22, 1992, at SkyDome in Toronto, Ontario

Team	1	2	3	4	5	6	7	8	9	R	H	E
Atlanta	1	0	0	1	5	0	0	0	0	7	13	0
Toronto	0	1	0	1	0	0	0	0	0	2	6	0
W: John Smoltz (1–0) L: Jack Morris (0–2) S: Mike Stanton (1)
HR: ATL – David Justice (1), Lonnie Smith (1)

==== Game 6 ====
October 24, 1992, at Atlanta–Fulton County Stadium in Atlanta

Team	1	2	3	4	5	6	7	8	9	10	11	R	H	E
Toronto	1	0	0	1	0	0	0	0	0	0	2	4	14	1
Atlanta	0	0	1	0	0	0	0	0	1	0	1	3	8	1
W: Jimmy Key (2–0) L: Charlie Leibrandt (0–1) S: Mike Timlin (1)
HR: TOR – Candy Maldonado (1)

== Awards and honors ==
- Tom Glavine, P – Pitcher of the Month, July
- Terry Pendleton, 3B, Gold Glove
- John Smoltz, P – NLCS MVP

=== All-Stars ===
1992 Major League Baseball All-Star Game

- Tom Glavine – starter, pitcher
- Terry Pendleton – starter, third base
- Ron Gant – reserve

== Farm system ==
Level	Team	League	Manager
AAA	Richmond Braves	International League	Chris Chambliss
AA	Greenville Braves	Southern League	Grady Little
A	Durham Bulls	Carolina League	Leon Roberts
A	Macon Braves	South Atlantic League	Brian Snitker
Rookie	Pulaski Braves	Appalachian League	Randy Ingle
Rookie	GCL Braves	Gulf Coast League	Jim Saul
Rookie	Idaho Falls Braves	Pioneer League	Dave Hilton

LEAGUE CHAMPIONS: Greenville
