= 1992 Major League Baseball postseason =

1992 Major League Baseball playoffs

Tournament details
- Dates: October 6–24, 1992
- Teams: 4

Final positions
- Champions: Toronto Blue Jays (1st title)
- Runners-up: Atlanta Braves

Tournament statistics
- Games played: 19
- Attendance: 979,145 (51,534 per game)
- Most HRs: Three tied (3)
- Most SBs: Roberto Alomar (TOR) & Otis Nixon (ATL) (8)
- Best ERA: Jimmy Key (TOR) (0.75)
- Most Ks (as pitcher): John Smoltz (ATL) (31)

Awards
- MVP: Pat Borders (TOR)

The 1992 Major League Baseball postseason was the playoff tournament of Major League Baseball for the 1992 season. The winners of each division advance to the postseason and face each other in a League Championship Series to determine the pennant winners that face each other in the World Series.

In the American League, the Toronto Blue Jays returned to the postseason for the second year in a row, and the Oakland Athletics returned for the fourth time in the past five seasons.

In the National League, the Atlanta Braves made their second of fourteen consecutive postseason appearances, and the Pittsburgh Pirates were making their third straight appearance. This was Pittsburgh’s last postseason appearance until 2013, as the team would experience twenty consecutive losing seasons afterward. As of 2026, this is the Pirates’ most recent postseason appearance as a division champion, and currently hold the longest division title drought in the majors.

The playoffs began on October 6, 1992, and concluded on October 24, 1992, with the Blue Jays defeating the Braves in six games in the 1992 World Series. The Blue Jays became the first team from Canada to win the World Series.

== Teams ==
American League Teams National League Teams

The following teams qualified for the postseason:

=== American League ===
- Toronto Blue Jays – 96–66, AL East champions
- Oakland Athletics – 96–66, AL West champions

=== National League ===
- Pittsburgh Pirates – 96–66, NL East champions
- Atlanta Braves – 98–64, NL West champions

== Playoff bracket ==
League Championship Series (ALCS, NLCS)
East	Toronto	4
West	Oakland	2
East	Pittsburgh	3
West	Atlanta	4

World Series
AL	Toronto	4
NL	Atlanta	2

== American League Championship Series ==
=== Toronto Blue Jays vs. Oakland Athletics ===
Toronto won the series, 4–2.

Game	Date	Score	Location	Time	Attendance
1	October 7	Oakland Athletics – 4, Toronto Blue Jays – 3	SkyDome	2:47	51,039
2	October 8	Oakland Athletics – 1, Toronto Blue Jays – 3	SkyDome	2:58	51,114
3	October 10	Toronto Blue Jays – 7, Oakland Athletics – 5	Oakland–Alameda County Coliseum	3:40	46,911
4	October 11	Toronto Blue Jays – 7, Oakland Athletics – 6 (11)	Oakland–Alameda County Coliseum	4:25	47,732
5	October 12	Toronto Blue Jays – 2, Oakland Athletics – 6	Oakland–Alameda County Coliseum	2:51	44,955
6	October 14	Oakland Athletics – 2, Toronto Blue Jays – 9	SkyDome	3:15	51,335

This was a rematch of the 1989 ALCS, which the Athletics won in five games en route to a World Series title. This time, the Blue Jays returned the favor, defeating the Athletics in six games to become the first team outside the United States to reach the World Series (in the process denying a rematch of the 1914 World Series between the Athletics and Braves).

Dave Stewart out-dueled Jack Morris as the Athletics took Game 1. Game 2 was another pitchers' duel between Toronto's David Cone and Oakland's Mike Moore, which would be won by the former as the Blue Jays evened the series headed to Oakland. Game 3 was a back-and-forth slugfest that was won by the Blue Jays as they took the series lead. Game 4 was notable for a furious late rally by the Blue Jays as they forced extra innings after putting up five runs across the seventh and eighth innings. Then in the top of the eleventh, an RBI sacrifice fly from Pat Borders put the Blue Jays in the lead for good as they took a 3–1 series lead. In Game 5, Stewart pitched a complete game, out-dueling Cone on the mound as the Athletics forced Game 6 back in Toronto. Game 5 was the last playoff game to be played at Oakland Coliseum with the open air view, prior to the installment of Mount Davis in 1996. In Game 6, the Blue Jays blew out the Athletics to clinch Canada’s first pennant. This was the first playoff series win by the Blue Jays in franchise history.

This marked the first time a Toronto-based team appeared in a championship series of the four major North American sports leagues since the 1967 Stanley Cup Final. The Blue Jays would win the pennant again the next year over the Chicago White Sox in six games en route to repeating as World Series champions.

The Athletics would return to the ALCS in 2006, but were swept by the Detroit Tigers, which would ultimately be their last during their time in Oakland as the team would move to Las Vegas after the 2024 season.

The 1992 ALCS began a streak of playoff success for Toronto-based teams over their San Francisco Bay Area counterparts. In 1994, the Toronto Maple Leafs defeated the San Jose Sharks in the second round of the 1994 Stanley Cup playoffs, then in 2019, the Toronto Raptors won the 2019 NBA Finals over the Golden State Warriors.

== National League Championship Series ==
=== Atlanta Braves vs. Pittsburgh Pirates ===
Atlanta won the series, 4–3.

Game	Date	Score	Location	Time	Attendance
1	October 6	Pittsburgh Pirates – 1, Atlanta Braves – 5	Atlanta–Fulton County Stadium	3:20	51,971
2	October 7	Pittsburgh Pirates – 5, Atlanta Braves – 13	Atlanta–Fulton County Stadium	3:20	51,975
3	October 9	Atlanta Braves – 2, Pittsburgh Pirates – 3	Three Rivers Stadium	2:37	56,610
4	October 10	Atlanta Braves – 6, Pittsburgh Pirates – 4	Three Rivers Stadium	3:10	57,164
5	October 11	Atlanta Braves – 1, Pittsburgh Pirates – 7	Three Rivers Stadium	2:52	52,929
6	October 13	Pittsburgh Pirates – 13, Atlanta Braves – 4	Atlanta–Fulton County Stadium	2:50	51,975
7	October 14	Pittsburgh Pirates – 2, Atlanta Braves – 3	Atlanta–Fulton County Stadium	3:22	51,975

This was a rematch of the previous year's series, which the Braves won in seven games. In what is considered to be one of the greatest postseason series in league history, the Braves dispatched the Pirates in seven games yet again to return to the World Series for the second year in a row.

John Smoltz pitched seven innings of shutout ball as the Braves took Game 1. In Game 2, Steve Avery pitched six shutout innings as the Braves blew out the Pirates to take a 2–0 series lead headed to Pittsburgh. In Game 3, Tim Wakefield out-dueled Tom Glavine in a classic pitchers’ duel as the former pitched a complete game in a Pirates victory. Smoltz earned his second victory of the series in Game 4 as the Braves took a 3–1 series lead and looked poised to close out the series. However, the Pirates responded. Bob Walk stifled the Braves’ offense in a complete game performance in Game 5 as the Pirates blew out the Braves to send the series back to Atlanta. Game 5 was the last postseason game ever played at Three Rivers Stadium, and remains the most recent NLCS game played in Pittsburgh to date. Then in Game 6, Barry Bonds ignited the Pirates’ offense as they chased Glavine from the mound in a blowout win to force a seventh game, with Wakefield earning his second complete game victory.

Game 7 was the most notable contest of the series. In the bottom of the ninth inning, the Pirates held a 2–1 lead and were one out away from returning to the World Series. However, the Braves had the bases loaded, and then Atlanta's Francisco Cabrera cracked a walk-off two-run RBI single that scored David Justice and Sid Bream. Bream famously slid to score the pennant-winning run, beating the throw by Bonds.

The series loss marked a turning point for the Pirates franchise, as the team fell into the beginning of an almost 20-year slump, posting 20 consecutive losing seasons, and they would only make the postseason three times since. As of 2026, this is the Pirates’ last postseason appearance outside of the divisional round, and this is their most recent postseason appearance as a division champion, as the Pirates hold the longest division title drought in the majors. The only team of the four major North American leagues with a longer division title drought are the NFL’s Cleveland Browns, who last won their division in 1989, three years before Pittsburgh’s last division title.

The Braves returned to the NLCS the next year, but were upset by the Philadelphia Phillies in six games. They would win their next pennant in 1995 in a sweep over the Cincinnati Reds en route to winning the World Series.

== 1992 World Series ==
=== Toronto Blue Jays (AL) vs. Atlanta Braves (NL) ===
Toronto won the series, 4–2.

Game	Date	Score	Location	Time	Attendance
1	October 17	Toronto Blue Jays – 1, Atlanta Braves – 3	Atlanta–Fulton County Stadium	2:37	51,763
2	October 18	Toronto Blue Jays – 5, Atlanta Braves – 4	Atlanta–Fulton County Stadium	3:30	51,763
3	October 20	Atlanta Braves – 2, Toronto Blue Jays – 3	SkyDome	2:49	51,813
4	October 21	Atlanta Braves – 1, Toronto Blue Jays – 2	SkyDome	2:21	52,090
5	October 22	Atlanta Braves – 7, Toronto Blue Jays – 2	SkyDome	3:05	52,268
6	October 24	Toronto Blue Jays – 4, Atlanta Braves – 3 (11)	Atlanta–Fulton County Stadium	4:07	51,763

This was the first World Series which had games hosted outside the United States. The Blue Jays defeated the Braves in six games to win their first World Series title in franchise history, becoming the first team from Canada to win the World Series, as well as the first Canadian team to win a championship other than the NHL’s Stanley Cup.

Tom Glavine out-dueled Jack Morris in Game 1, as he pitched a complete game in a 3–1 Braves victory. In Game 2, the Blue Jays overcame a one-run Braves lead late thanks to a two-run home run from Ed Sprague Jr. in the top of the ninth, evening the series headed to Toronto. In the first World Series game played in Canada, the Blue Jays overcame a late Braves lead to win Game 3, capped off by a walk-off RBI from Candy Maldonado in the bottom of the ninth. Jimmy Key out-dueled Glavine in Game 4 as the Blue Jays won 2–1 to take a 3–1 series lead. However, the Braves were not done yet. In Game 5, Morris was handed his second loss of the series, where he was badly outdueled by John Smoltz in a Braves blowout win to send the series back to Atlanta. Game 5 would ultimately be Morris’ final postseason game. Game 6 went into extra innings, and in the top of the eleventh, the Blue Jays took the lead for good with a two-run RBI double from Dave Winfield. The Braves put up one more run in the bottom of the inning to cut the Blue Jays' lead to one, but relief pitcher Mike Timlin was able to preserve the lead as the Blue Jays clinched the title.

This was the first major league championship won by a team from Toronto since 1967, when the NHL’s Toronto Maple Leafs won their 13th and most recent Stanley Cup. The Blue Jays returned to the World Series the following year, and defeated the Philadelphia Phillies in six games to repeat as champions.

The Braves would return to the World Series in 1995, and defeated the Cleveland Indians in six games to end a 38-year championship drought.

== Broadcasting ==
This marked the third year of a four-year agreement with CBS to televise all postseason games nationally in the United States.
