= 1992 San Diego Padres season =

1992 San Diego Padres
- League: National League
- Division: West
- Ballpark: Jack Murphy Stadium
- City: San Diego
- Record: 82–80 (.506)
- Divisional place: 3rd
- Owners: Tom Werner
- General managers: Joe McIlvaine
- Managers: Greg Riddoch, Jim Riggleman
- Television: KUSI-TV; San Diego Cable Sports Network (Rick Monday, Jerry Coleman, Ted Leitner, Bob Chandler); XHBJ-TV (Rafael Munoz Oretga, Victor Villa)
- Radio: KFMB (AM) (Bob Chandler, Jerry Coleman, Rick Monday, Ted Leitner); XEXX (Mario Thomas Zapiain, Santos Perez, Eduardo Ortega)

The 1992 San Diego Padres season was the 24th season in franchise history. It saw the team finish in third place in the National League West with a record of 82 wins and 80 losses. They also hosted the 1992 Major League Baseball All-Star Game on July 14.

== Offseason ==
- November 20, 1991: Derek Lilliquist was selected off waivers from the Padres by the Cleveland Indians.
- December 8, 1991: Bip Roberts and a player to be named later were traded by the Padres to the Cincinnati Reds for Randy Myers. The Padres completed the trade by sending Craig Pueschner (minors) to the Reds on December 9.
- December 11, 1991: Steve Rosenberg was traded by the Padres to the New York Mets for Jeff Gardner.
- January 8, 1992: Tim Teufel was signed as a free agent by the Padres.
- March 26, 1992: Ricky Bones, José Valentín, and Matt Mieske were traded by the Padres to the Milwaukee Brewers for Gary Sheffield and Geoff Kellogg (minors).

== Regular season ==
=== All-Star game ===
The 1992 Major League Baseball All-Star Game was the 63rd playing of the midsummer classic between the all-stars of the American League (AL) and National League (NL). The game was held on July 14, 1992, at Jack Murphy Stadium in San Diego. The game resulted in the American League defeating the National League 13-6.

=== Season standings ===
NL West
Team	W	L	Pct.	GB	Home	Road
Atlanta Braves	98	64	.605	—	51‍–‍30	47‍–‍34
Cincinnati Reds	90	72	.556	8	53‍–‍28	37‍–‍44
San Diego Padres	82	80	.506	16	45‍–‍36	37‍–‍44
Houston Astros	81	81	.500	17	47‍–‍34	34‍–‍47
San Francisco Giants	72	90	.444	26	42‍–‍39	30‍–‍51
Los Angeles Dodgers	63	99	.389	35	37‍–‍44	26‍–‍55

=== Record vs. opponents ===
1992 National League record Sources:
Team	ATL	CHC	CIN	HOU	LAD	MON	NYM	PHI	PIT	SD	SF	STL
Atlanta	—	10–2	9–9	13–5	12–6	4–8	7–5	6–6	7–5	13–5	11–7	6–6
Chicago	2–10	—	5–7	8–4	6–6	7–11	9–9	9–9	8–10	5–7	8–4	11–7
Cincinnati	9–9	7–5	—	10–8	11–7	5–7	7–5	7–5	6–6	11–7	10–8	7–5
Houston	5–13	4–8	8–10	—	13–5	8–4	5–7	8–4	6–6	7–11	12–6	5–7
Los Angeles	6–12	6–6	7–11	5–13	—	4–8	5–7	5–7	5–7	9–9	7–11	4–8
Montreal	8–4	11–7	7–5	4–8	8–4	—	12–6	9–9	9–9	8–4	5–7	6–12
New York	5–7	9–9	5–7	7–5	7–5	6–12	—	6–12	4–14	4–8	10–2	9–9
Philadelphia	6-6	9–9	5–7	4–8	7–5	9–9	12–6	—	5–13	3–9	3–9	7–11
Pittsburgh	5–7	10–8	6–6	6–6	7–5	9–9	14–4	13–5	—	5–7	6–6	15–3
San Diego	5–13	7–5	7–11	11–7	9–9	4–8	8–4	9–3	7–5	—	11–7	4–8
San Francisco	7–11	4–8	8–10	6–12	11–7	7–5	2–10	9–3	6–6	7–11	—	5–7
St. Louis	6–6	7–11	5–7	7–5	8–4	12–6	9–9	11–7	3–15	8–4	7–5	—

=== Notable transactions ===
- June 1, 1992: Todd Helton was drafted by the Padres in the 2nd round of the 1992 Major League Baseball draft, but did not sign.
- July 6, 1992: Scott Coolbaugh was traded by the Padres to the Cincinnati Reds for Lenny Wentz (minors).

=== Roster ===
1992 San Diego Padres
Roster
Pitchers: 27 Larry Andersen; 40 Andy Benes; 49 Doug Brocail; 38 Pat Clements; 38 Jim Deshaies; 45 Dave Eiland; 33 Gene Harris; 46 Greg W. Harris; 50 Jeremy Hernandez; 47 Bruce Hurst; 11,37 Craig Lefferts; 51 Mike Maddux; 48 José Meléndez; 28 Randy Myers; 42 Rich Rodriguez; 54 Tim Scott; 44 Frank Seminara	Catchers: 7 Dann Bilardello; 25 Tom Lampkin; 09 Benito Santiago; 58 Dan Walters; Infielders: 23 Paul Faries; 1 Tony Fernández; 41 Jeff Gardner; 29 Fred McGriff; 10 Gary Sheffield; 18 Craig Shipley; 15 Kurt Stillwell; 20 Tim Teufel; 43 Guillermo Velasquez	Outfielders: 22 Oscar Azócar; 24 Jerald Clark; 19 Tony Gwynn; 4 Darrin Jackson; 8 Gary Pettis; 21 Phil Stephenson; 2 Jim Vatcher; 30 Kevin Ward; Other batters: 33 Thomas Howard	Manager: 3 Greg Riddoch; 8 Jim Riggleman; Coaches: 34 Bruce Kimm (third base); 5 Rob Picciolo (first base); 16 Merv Rettenmund (hitting); 36 Mike Roarke (pitching); 17 Jim Snyder (bench)

== Player stats ==
= Indicates team leader

= Indicates league leader

=== Batting ===
==== Starters by position ====
Note: Pos = Position; G = Games played; AB = At bats; H = Hits; Avg. = Batting average; HR = Home runs; RBI = Runs batted in

Pos	Player	G	AB	H	Avg.	HR	RBI
C	Benito Santiago	106	386	97	.251	10	42
1B	Fred McGriff	152	531	152	.286	35	104
2B	Kurt Stillwell	114	379	86	.227	2	24
3B	Gary Sheffield	146	557	184	.330	33	100
SS	Tony Fernández	155	622	171	.275	4	37
LF	Jerald Clark	146	496	120	.242	12	58
CF	Darrin Jackson	155	587	146	.249	17	70
RF	Tony Gwynn	128	520	165	.317	6	41

==== Other batters ====
Note: G = Games played; AB = At bats; H = Hits; Avg. = Batting average; HR = Home runs; RBI = Runs batted in

Player	G	AB	H	Avg.	HR	RBI
Tim Teufel	101	246	55	.224	6	25
Dan Walters	57	179	45	.251	4	22
Oscar Azócar	99	168	32	.190	0	8
Kevin Ward	81	147	29	.197	3	12
Craig Shipley	52	105	26	.248	0	7
Phil Stephenson	53	71	11	.155	0	8
Dann Bilardello	17	33	4	.121	0	1
Gary Pettis	30	30	6	.200	0	0
Guillermo Velasquez	15	23	7	.304	1	5
Jeff Gardner	15	19	2	.105	0	0
Tom Lampkin	9	17	4	.235	0	0
Jim Vatcher	13	16	2	.125	0	0
Paul Faries	10	11	5	.455	0	1
Thomas Howard	5	3	1	.333	0	0

=== Pitching ===
==== Starting pitchers ====
Note: G = Games pitched; CG = Complete games; IP = Innings pitched; W = Wins; L = Losses; ERA = Earned run average; SO = Strikeouts

Player	G	CG	IP	W	L	ERA	SO
Andy Benes	34	2	231.1	13	14	3.35	169
Bruce Hurst	32	6	217.1	14	9	3.85	131
Craig Lefferts	27	0	163.1	13	9	3.69	81
Greg Harris	20	1	118.0	4	8	4.12	66
Frank Seminara	19	0	100.1	9	4	3.68	61
Jim Deshaies	15	0	96.0	4	7	3.28	46
Dave Eiland	7	0	27.0	0	2	5.67	10
Doug Brocail	3	0	14.0	0	0	6.43	15

==== Relief pitchers ====
Note: G = Games pitched; W = Wins; L = Losses; SV = Saves; ERA = Earned run average; SO = Strikeouts

Player	G	W	L	SV	ERA	SO
Randy Myers	66	3	6	38	4.29	66
Rich Rodriguez	61	6	3	0	2.37	64
José Meléndez	56	6	7	0	2.92	82
Mike Maddux	50	2	2	5	2.37	60
Tim Scott	34	4	1	0	5.26	30
Larry Andersen	34	1	1	2	3.34	35
Pat Clements	27	2	1	0	2.66	11
Jeremy Hernandez	26	1	4	1	4.17	25
Gene Harris	14	0	2	0	2.95	19

== Awards and honors ==
- Fred McGriff, National League Home Run Champion (35)
- Gary Sheffield, National League Batting Champion, .330

1992 Major League Baseball All-Star Game

- Benito Santiago, Catcher, Starter
- Fred McGriff, 1B, Starter
- Tony Gwynn, Outfield, Starter

== Farm system ==
Level	Team	League	Manager
AAA	Las Vegas Stars	Pacific Coast League	Jim Riggleman
AA	Wichita Wranglers	Texas League	Bruce Bochy
A	High Desert Mavericks	California League	Bryan Little
A	Waterloo Diamonds	Midwest League	Keith Champion
A	Charleston Rainbows	South Atlantic League	Dave Trembley
A-Short Season	Spokane Indians	Northwest League	Ed Romero
Rookie	AZL Padres	Arizona League	Ken Berry

LEAGUE CHAMPIONS: Wichita
