= 1992 Cincinnati Reds season =

1992 Cincinnati Reds
- League: National League
- Division: West
- Ballpark: Riverfront Stadium
- City: Cincinnati
- Record: 90–72 (.556)
- Divisional place: 2nd
- Owners: Marge Schott
- General managers: Bob Quinn
- Managers: Lou Piniella
- Television: WLWT (Marty Brennaman, Gordy Coleman, Steve LaMar); SportsChannel (Gordy Coleman, Steve LaMar)
- Radio: WLW (Marty Brennaman, Joe Nuxhall, Gordy Coleman, Steve LaMar)

The 1992 Cincinnati Reds season was the 123rd season for the franchise in Major League Baseball, and their 23rd and 22nd full season at Riverfront Stadium. The Reds finished in second place in the National League West with a record of 90 wins and 72 losses.

This was the final season in which the Reds donned the pullover jersey and beltless pants uniform style first worn in 1972 (the Reds being the last MLB team still wearing them). Following this season they switched back to a traditional baseball uniform. This was also the final season they wore their Big Red Machine era uniforms which were introduced in 1967.

== Offseason ==
- November 12, 1991: Jacob Brumfield was signed as a free agent.
- November 12, 1991: Darnell Coles was signed as a free agent from the San Francisco Giants.
- November 15, 1991: Greg Swindell was acquired from the Cleveland Indians for Jack Armstrong, Scott Scudder, and Joe Turek (minors).
- November 15, 1991: Troy Afenir was signed as a free agent from the Oakland Athletics.
- November 27, 1991: Eric Davis and Kip Gross were traded to the Los Angeles Dodgers for Tim Belcher and John Wetteland.
- December 2, 1991: Bob Geren was selected off waivers from the New York Yankees.
- December 8, 1991: Randy Myers was traded to the San Diego Padres for a player to be named later and Bip Roberts. The San Diego Padres sent Craig Pueschner (minors) to the Reds the next day to complete the trade.
- December 11, 1991: John Wetteland was traded to the Montreal Expos for Dave Martinez.
- February 2, 1992: Al Newman was signed as a free agent from the Minnesota Twins.
- March 17, 1992: Bob Geren was released by the Reds.

== Regular season ==
=== Season standings ===
NL West
Team	W	L	Pct.	GB	Home	Road
Atlanta Braves	98	64	.605	—	51‍–‍30	47‍–‍34
Cincinnati Reds	90	72	.556	8	53‍–‍28	37‍–‍44
San Diego Padres	82	80	.506	16	45‍–‍36	37‍–‍44
Houston Astros	81	81	.500	17	47‍–‍34	34‍–‍47
San Francisco Giants	72	90	.444	26	42‍–‍39	30‍–‍51
Los Angeles Dodgers	63	99	.389	35	37‍–‍44	26‍–‍55

=== Record vs. opponents ===
1992 National League record Sources:
Team	ATL	CHC	CIN	HOU	LAD	MON	NYM	PHI	PIT	SD	SF	STL
Atlanta	—	10–2	9–9	13–5	12–6	4–8	7–5	6–6	7–5	13–5	11–7	6–6
Chicago	2–10	—	5–7	8–4	6–6	7–11	9–9	9–9	8–10	5–7	8–4	11–7
Cincinnati	9–9	7–5	—	10–8	11–7	5–7	7–5	7–5	6–6	11–7	10–8	7–5
Houston	5–13	4–8	8–10	—	13–5	8–4	5–7	8–4	6–6	7–11	12–6	5–7
Los Angeles	6–12	6–6	7–11	5–13	—	4–8	5–7	5–7	5–7	9–9	7–11	4–8
Montreal	8–4	11–7	7–5	4–8	8–4	—	12–6	9–9	9–9	8–4	5–7	6–12
New York	5–7	9–9	5–7	7–5	7–5	6–12	—	6–12	4–14	4–8	10–2	9–9
Philadelphia	6-6	9–9	5–7	4–8	7–5	9–9	12–6	—	5–13	3–9	3–9	7–11
Pittsburgh	5–7	10–8	6–6	6–6	7–5	9–9	14–4	13–5	—	5–7	6–6	15–3
San Diego	5–13	7–5	7–11	11–7	9–9	4–8	8–4	9–3	7–5	—	11–7	4–8
San Francisco	7–11	4–8	8–10	6–12	11–7	7–5	2–10	9–3	6–6	7–11	—	5–7
St. Louis	6–6	7–11	5–7	7–5	8–4	12–6	9–9	11–7	3–15	8–4	7–5	—

=== Transactions ===
- April 1, 1992: Al Newman was released by the Cincinnati Reds.
- June 9, 1992: Scott Service was signed as a free agent with the Cincinnati Reds.
- July 6, 1992: Scott Coolbaugh was traded by the San Diego Padres to the Cincinnati Reds for Lenny Wentz (minors).

=== Roster ===
1992 Cincinnati Reds
Roster
Pitchers: 59 Bobby Ayala; 25,50 Scott Bankhead; 31 Tim Belcher; 50 Tom Bolton; 59 Keith Brown; 32 Tom Browning; 37 Norm Charlton; 49 Rob Dibble; 54 Steve Foster; 45 Chris Hammond; 48 Dwayne Henry; 39 Milt Hill; 52 Tony Menéndez; 55 Tim Pugh; 27 José Rijo; 28 Scott Ruskin; 29 Greg Swindell	Catchers: 38 Troy Afenir; 47 Scott Bradley; 9 Joe Oliver; 34 Jeff Reed; 6 Dan Wilson; 7 Rick Wrona; Infielders: 12,57 Freddie Benavides; 20,58 Jeff Branson; 26 Darnell Coles; 57 Tim Costo; 19 Bill Doran; 40 Gary Green; 56 Willie Greene; 11 Barry Larkin; 23 Hal Morris; 17 Chris Sabo	Outfielders: 35 Gerónimo Berroa; 15 Glenn Braggs; 46 Jacob Brumfield; 22 Billy Hatcher; 58 César Hernández; 30 Dave Martinez; 21 Paul O'Neill; 10 Bip Roberts; 16,53 Reggie Sanders	Manager: 41 Lou Piniella; Coaches: 8 John McLaren (Assistant); 4 Jackie Moore (Bench); 24 Tony Pérez (Hitting/First Base); 2 Sam Perlozzo (Third Base); 3 Larry Rothschild (Bullpen)

== Player stats ==
=== Batting ===
==== Starters by position ====
Note: Pos = Position; G = Games played; AB = At bats; H = Hits; Avg. = Batting average; HR = Home runs; RBI = Runs batted in

Pos	Player	G	AB	H	Avg.	HR	RBI
C	Joe Oliver	143	485	131	.270	10	57
1B	Hal Morris	115	395	107	.271	6	53
2B	Bill Doran	132	387	91	.235	8	47
3B	Chris Sabo	96	344	84	.244	12	43
SS	Barry Larkin	140	533	162	.314	12	78
LF	Bip Roberts	147	532	172	.323	4	45
CF	Dave Martinez	135	393	100	.254	3	31
RF	Paul O'Neill	148	496	122	.246	14	66

==== Other batters ====
Note: G = Games played; AB = At bats; H = Hits; Avg. = Batting average; HR = Home runs; RBI = Runs batted in

Player	G	AB	H	Avg.	HR	RBI
Reggie Sanders	116	385	104	.270	12	36
Glenn Braggs	92	266	63	.237	8	38
Freddie Benavides	74	173	40	.231	1	17
Darnell Coles	55	141	44	.312	3	18
Jeff Branson	72	115	34	.296	0	15
Billy Hatcher	43	94	27	.287	2	10
Willie Greene	29	93	25	.269	2	13
César Hernández	34	51	14	.275	0	4
Tim Costo	12	36	8	.222	0	2
Troy Afenir	16	34	6	.176	0	4
Jacob Brumfield	24	30	4	.133	0	2
Dan Wilson	12	25	9	.360	0	3
Jeff Reed	15	25	4	.160	0	2
Rick Wrona	11	23	4	.174	0	0
Gerónimo Berroa	13	15	4	.267	0	0
Gary Green	8	12	4	.333	0	0
Scott Bradley	5	5	2	.400	0	1

=== Pitching ===
==== Starting pitchers ====
Note: G = Games pitched; IP = Innings pitched; W = Wins; L = Losses; ERA = Earned run average; SO = Strikeouts

Player	G	IP	W	L	ERA	SO
Tim Belcher	35	227.2	15	14	3.91	149
Greg Swindell	31	213.2	12	8	2.70	138
José Rijo	33	211.0	15	10	2.56	171
Chris Hammond	28	147.1	7	10	4.21	79
Tom Browning	16	87.0	6	5	5.07	33
Tim Pugh	7	45.1	4	2	2.58	18
Bobby Ayala	5	29.0	2	1	4.34	23
Keith Brown	2	8.0	0	1	4.50	5

==== Other pitchers ====
Note: G = Games pitched; IP = Innings pitched; W = Wins; L = Losses; ERA = Earned run average; SO = Strikeouts

Player	G	IP	W	L	ERA	SO
Tom Bolton	16	46.1	3	3	5.24	27

==== Relief pitchers ====
Note: G = Games pitched; W = Wins; L = Losses; SV = Saves; ERA = Earned run average; SO = Strikeouts

Player	G	W	L	SV	ERA	SO
Norm Charlton	64	4	2	26	2.99	90
Rob Dibble	63	3	5	25	3.07	110
Dwayne Henry	60	3	3	0	3.33	72
Scott Ruskin	57	4	3	0	5.03	43
Scott Bankhead	54	10	4	1	2.93	53
Steve Foster	31	1	1	2	2.88	34
Milt Hill	14	0	0	1	3.15	10
Tony Menéndez	3	1	0	0	1.93	5

== Farm system ==
Level	Team	League	Manager
AAA	Nashville Sounds	American Association	Pete Mackanin and Dave Miley
AA	Chattanooga Lookouts	Southern League	Dave Miley and Ron Oester
A	Cedar Rapids Reds	Midwest League	Mark Berry
A	Charleston Wheelers	South Atlantic League	P. J. Carey
Rookie	Princeton Reds	Appalachian League	Sam Mejías
Rookie	Billings Mustangs	Pioneer League	Donnie Scott

LEAGUE CHAMPIONS: Cedar Rapids, Billings
