= 1992 Los Angeles Dodgers season =

1992 Los Angeles Dodgers
- League: National League
- Division: West
- Ballpark: Dodger Stadium
- City: Los Angeles
- Record: 63–99 (.389)
- Divisional place: 6th
- Owners: Peter O'Malley
- General managers: Fred Claire
- Managers: Tommy Lasorda
- Television: KTTV (11); Vin Scully, Ross Porter, Don Drysdale; SportsChannel Los Angeles; Ross Porter, Don Drysdale
- Radio: KABC; Vin Scully, Ross Porter, Don Drysdale; KWKW; Jaime Jarrín, René Cárdenas; KYPA; Richard Choi

The 1992 Los Angeles Dodgers season was the 103rd for the franchise in Major League Baseball, and their 35th season in Los Angeles, California.

Despite boasting what was nicknamed the "Outfield of Dreams", being manned by Eric Davis, Brett Butler, and Darryl Strawberry, injuries to key players and slumps from others contributed to the franchise's worst season since moving to Los Angeles with 63 wins and 99 losses for a last place finish in the National League West, regressing 30 games from the previous season; it was their worst season since 1908 when they were known as the “Brooklyn Superbas”. It was the first time the Dodgers lost 90 games in a season since 1944, when major league rosters were depleted by World War II, and the first time they did so as a Los Angeles team. Additionally, the Dodgers cancelled four home games due to the 1992 Los Angeles riots.

Despite the poor finish, the Dodgers had some hope for the future as first baseman Eric Karros won the National League Rookie of the Year Award, the first of five consecutive Dodger players to do so. The 1992 season also saw the Dodgers drop television station KTTV Ch.11 as their chief broadcaster of Dodger baseball, ending a 34 year, 35 consecutive season association with that station.

== Offseason ==
- November 27, 1991: Acquired Eric Davis and Kip Gross from the Cincinnati Reds for Tim Belcher and John Wetteland.
- December 11, 1991: Acquired Rudy Seánez from the Cleveland Indians for Dennis Cook and Mike Christopher
- December 11, 1991: Acquired Todd Benzinger from the Kansas City Royals for Chris Gwynn and Domingo Mota

== Regular season ==
=== Season standings ===
NL West
Team	W	L	Pct.	GB	Home	Road
Atlanta Braves	98	64	.605	—	51‍–‍30	47‍–‍34
Cincinnati Reds	90	72	.556	8	53‍–‍28	37‍–‍44
San Diego Padres	82	80	.506	16	45‍–‍36	37‍–‍44
Houston Astros	81	81	.500	17	47‍–‍34	34‍–‍47
San Francisco Giants	72	90	.444	26	42‍–‍39	30‍–‍51
Los Angeles Dodgers	63	99	.389	35	37‍–‍44	26‍–‍55

=== Record vs. opponents ===
1992 National League record Sources:
Team	ATL	CHC	CIN	HOU	LAD	MON	NYM	PHI	PIT	SD	SF	STL
Atlanta	—	10–2	9–9	13–5	12–6	4–8	7–5	6–6	7–5	13–5	11–7	6–6
Chicago	2–10	—	5–7	8–4	6–6	7–11	9–9	9–9	8–10	5–7	8–4	11–7
Cincinnati	9–9	7–5	—	10–8	11–7	5–7	7–5	7–5	6–6	11–7	10–8	7–5
Houston	5–13	4–8	8–10	—	13–5	8–4	5–7	8–4	6–6	7–11	12–6	5–7
Los Angeles	6–12	6–6	7–11	5–13	—	4–8	5–7	5–7	5–7	9–9	7–11	4–8
Montreal	8–4	11–7	7–5	4–8	8–4	—	12–6	9–9	9–9	8–4	5–7	6–12
New York	5–7	9–9	5–7	7–5	7–5	6–12	—	6–12	4–14	4–8	10–2	9–9
Philadelphia	6-6	9–9	5–7	4–8	7–5	9–9	12–6	—	5–13	3–9	3–9	7–11
Pittsburgh	5–7	10–8	6–6	6–6	7–5	9–9	14–4	13–5	—	5–7	6–6	15–3
San Diego	5–13	7–5	7–11	11–7	9–9	4–8	8–4	9–3	7–5	—	11–7	4–8
San Francisco	7–11	4–8	8–10	6–12	11–7	7–5	2–10	9–3	6–6	7–11	—	5–7
St. Louis	6–6	7–11	5–7	7–5	8–4	12–6	9–9	11–7	3–15	8–4	7–5	—

=== Opening Day lineup ===
Opening Day starters
Name	Position
Brett Butler	Center fielder
Lenny Harris	Third baseman
Kal Daniels	First baseman
Darryl Strawberry	Right fielder
Eric Davis	Left fielder
Juan Samuel	Second baseman
Mike Scioscia	Catcher
José Offerman	Shortstop
Ramón Martínez	Starting pitcher

=== Notable transactions ===
- June 27, 1992: Acquired Mike Sodders from the Chicago Cubs for Kal Daniels
- July 2, 1992: Acquired Steve Searcy and Julio Peguero from the Philadelphia Phillies for Stan Javier
- July 30, 1992: Juan Samuel was released by the Los Angeles Dodgers.

=== Roster ===
1992 Los Angeles Dodgers
Roster
Pitchers: 56 Pedro Astacio; 54 John Candelaria; 49 Tom Candiotti; 52 Tim Crews; 35 Jim Gott; 46 Kevin Gross; 57 Kip Gross; 55 Orel Hershiser; 50 Jay Howell; 45 Pedro Martínez; 48 Ramón Martínez; 31 Roger McDowell; 17 Bob Ojeda; 38 Steve Wilson	Catchers: 41 Carlos Hernández; 25 Mike Piazza; 14 Mike Scioscia; Infielders: 12 Dave Anderson; 28 Rafael Bournigal; 15 Dave Hansen; 29 Lenny Harris; 23 Eric Karros; 30 José Offerman; 10 Juan Samuel; 27 Mike Sharperson; 21 Eric Young	Outfielders: 7 Billy Ashley; 36 Todd Benzinger; 22 Brett Butler; 28 Kal Daniels; 33 Eric Davis; 47 Tom Goodwin; 26 Henry Rodríguez; 5 Stan Javier; 44 Darryl Strawberry; 20 Mitch Webster	Manager: 2 Tommy Lasorda; Coaches: 8 Joey Amalfitano (third base); 58 Mark Cresse (bullpen); 13 Joe Ferguson (first base); 35 Ben Hines (hitting); 11 Manny Mota; 16 Ron Perranoski (pitching); 68 Ron Roenicke (bench)

== Starting Pitchers stats ==
Note: G = Games pitched; GS = Games started; IP = Innings pitched; W/L = Wins/Losses; ERA = Earned run average; BB = Walks allowed; SO = Strikeouts; CG = Complete games

Name	G	GS	IP	W/L	ERA	BB	SO	CG
Orel Hershiser	33	33	210.2	10-15	3.67	69	130	1
Kevin Gross	34	30	204.2	8-13	3.17	77	158	4
Tom Candiotti	32	30	203.2	11-15	3.00	63	152	6
Bob Ojeda	29	29	166.1	6-9	3.63	81	94	2
Ramón Martínez	29	25	150.2	8-11	4.00	69	101	1
Pedro Astacio	11	11	82.0	5-5	0.98	20	43	4

== Relief Pitchers stats ==
Note: G = Games pitched; GS = Games started; IP = Innings pitched; W/L = Wins/Losses; ERA = Earned run average; BB = Walks allowed; SO = Strikeouts; SV = Saves

Name	G	GS	IP	W/L	ERA	BB	SO	SV
Roger McDowell	65	0	83.2	6-10	4.09	42	50	14
Jim Gott	68	0	88.0	3-3	2.45	41	75	6
Steve Wilson	60	0	66.2	2-5	4.19	29	54	0
John Candelaria	50	0	25.1	2-5	2.84	13	23	5
Tim Crews	49	2	78.0	0-3	5.19	20	23	0
Jay Howell	41	0	46.2	1-3	1.54	18	36	4
Kip Gross	16	1	23.2	1-1	4.18	10	14	0
Pedro Martínez	2	1	8.0	0-1	2.25	1	8	0

== Batting Stats ==
Note: Pos = Position; AB = At bats; Avg. = Batting average; R = Runs scored; H = Hits; HR = Home runs; RBI = Runs batted in; SB = Stolen bases

Name	Pos	G	AB	Avg.	R	H	HR	RBI	SB
Mike Scioscia	C	117	348	.221	19	77	3	24	3
Eric Karros	1B	149	545	.257	63	140	20	88	2
Lenny Harris	2B	135	347	.271	28	94	0	30	19
José Offerman	SS	149	534	.260	67	139	1	30	23
Dave Hansen	3B	132	341	.214	30	73	6	22	0
Eric Davis	LF	76	267	.228	21	61	5	32	19
Brett Butler	CF	157	553	.309	86	171	3	39	41
Darryl Strawberry	RF	43	156	.237	20	37	5	25	3
Mike Sharperson	IF	128	317	.300	48	95	3	36	2
Todd Benzinger	UT	121	293	.239	24	70	4	31	2
Mitch Webster	OF	135	262	.267	33	70	6	35	11
Carlos Hernández	C	69	173	.260	11	45	3	17	0
Henry Rodríguez	RF	53	146	.219	11	32	3	14	0
Eric Young	2B	49	132	.258	9	34	1	11	6
Juan Samuel	2B	47	122	.262	7	32	0	15	2
Kal Daniels	LF	35	104	.231	9	24	2	8	0
Billy Ashley	RF	29	95	.221	6	21	2	6	0
Dave Anderson	3B	51	84	.286	10	24	3	8	0
Tom Goodwin	LF	57	73	.233	15	17	0	3	7
Mike Piazza	C	21	69	.232	5	16	1	7	0
Stan Javier	OF	56	58	.190	6	11	1	5	1
Rafael Bournigal	SS	10	20	.150	1	3	0	0	0

== 1992 Awards ==
- 1992 Major League Baseball All-Star Game
  - Mike Sharperson reserve
- Rookie of the Year Award
  - Eric Karros
- Baseball Digest Rookie All-Stars
  - Eric Karros
- TSN Rookie of the Year Award
  - Eric Karros
- NL Player of the Month
  - Brett Butler (July 1992)
- NL Player of the Week
  - Tom Candiotti (Apr. 13–19)
  - Brett Butler (July 20–26)
  - Eric Karros (July 27 – Aug. 2)
  - Kevin Gross (Aug. 17–23)

== Farm system ==
Level	Team	League	Manager
AAA	Albuquerque Dukes	Pacific Coast League	Bill Russell
AA	San Antonio Missions	Texas League	Jerry Royster
High A	Bakersfield Dodgers	California League	Tom Beyers
High A	Vero Beach Dodgers	Florida State League	Glenn Hoffman
A-Short Season	Yakima Bears	Northwest League	Joe Vavra
Rookie	Great Falls Dodgers	Pioneer League	Jon Debus
Rookie	Gulf Coast Dodgers	Gulf Coast League	John Shoemaker
Rookie	DSL Dodgers; DSL Dodgers 2	Dominican Summer League	

== Major League Baseball draft ==
The Dodgers selected 53 players in this draft. Of those, only one of them would eventually play Major League baseball. The Dodgers lost their first round pick to the Toronto Blue Jays as a result of their signing free agent Tom Candiotti but gained two supplemental first round picks, a second round pick and a third round pick as compensation for departing free agents Eddie Murray and Mike Morgan.

With their first pick, the Dodgers selected catcher Ryan Luzinski from Holy Cross High School. The son of former Major Leaguer Greg Luzinski, he was a promising power hitter when he spurned a letter of intent with the University of Miami to sign with the Dodgers. However, he never quite lived up to his promise. Blocked by Mike Piazza's ascent with the Dodgers, he bounced around the teams farm system until a trade to the Baltimore Orioles in 1997. In eight minor league seasons, he hit .265 with 49 home runs and 296 RBI but could never make the move from AAA to the Majors.

The other first round pick, outfielder Mike Moore from UCLA also failed to advance, he hit .242 in 912 big league games over 14 seasons (six of which were in the independent leagues).

The only player from this draft class to make the Majors was infielder Keith Johnson from the University of the Pacific. He appeared in six games for the 2000 Anaheim Angels and had two hits in four at-bats. He would later become a AAA manager in the Angels system for the Salt Lake Bees.

1992 draft picks

Round	Name	Position	School	Signed	Career span	Highest level
1s	Ryan Luzinski	C	Holy Cross High School	Yes	1992–1999	AAA
1s	Mike Moore	OF	University of California, Los Angeles	Yes	1992–2006	AAA
2	Dwaine Bostic	SS	Morse High School	Yes	1992–1998	Rookie
2	Dan Melendez	1B	Pepperdine University	Yes	1992–2000	AAA
3	Dwight Maness	OF	William Penn High School	Yes	1992–2007	AAA
3	Dave Spykstra	RHP	Cherry Creek High School	Yes	1992–2004	A+
4	Keith Johnson	SS	University of the Pacific	Yes	1992–2003	MLB
5	Chris Abbe	C	University of Texas at Austin	Yes	1992–1994	AA
6	John Graves	RHP	California State University, Long Beach	Yes	1992–1995	A-
7	Brian Richardson	3B	St. Bernard High School	Yes	1992–2001	AAA
8	Daniel Markham	LHP	Diablo Valley College	Yes	1992–1993	Rookie
9	Ryan Henderson	RHP	University of Southern California	Yes	1992–2013	AAA
10	Dave Post	3B	Kingston High School	Yes	1992–2003	AAA
11	Brenton Colson	LHP	Georgia Institute of Technology	Yes	1992–1993	A+
12	Juan Hernaiz	OF	Colegio Maria Auxiliador	Yes	1992–1999	AA
13	Jason Butcher	RHP	Albertson College	Yes	1992–1996	A+
14	Reginald Johnson	3B	Georgia Institute of Technology	Yes	1992–1993	A+
15	Brandon White	RHP	Eastern Michigan University	Yes	1992–1993	A+
16	Jim Martin	OF	Oklahoma State University	Yes	1992–1999	AAA
17	Keith Troutman	RHP	Spartanburg Methodist College	Yes	1992–2000	AAA
18	Ervan Wingate	SS	Redlands High School	Yes	1992–2000	AA
19	Dave Pyc	LHP	College of Charleston	Yes	1992–1999	AAA
20	Widd Workman	RHP	Gilbert High School	No; Padres-1996	1996–1999	AA
21	Paul Wittig	C	Bremerton High School	Yes	1992–1995	A+
22	Tyrone Lewis	SS	Waco High School	Yes	1992–1996	A+
23	Del Schleuss	LHP	Musselman High School	No; Reds-1995	1995	Rookie
24	Ryan Duffy	LHP	Northeastern Oklahoma A&M College	No; Pirates-1994	1994–1997	A+
25	Matthew Powell	RHP	Miami Southside Senior High School	No		
26	Kevin Pitts	OF	Kishwaukee College	Yes	1993–2004	A+
27	Danny Sarmiento	LHP	Tempe High School	Yes	1992–1998	A
28	Jeff Velez	RHP	Greenwich High School	No; Cubs-1996	1996	A-
29	Sean Watkins	1B	Peoria Notre Dame High School	No; Padres-1995	1995–1998	A+
30	Kyle Evans	1B	Katella High School	No; Rangers-1995	1995	A-
31	Ken Cook	RHP	Spartanburg Methodist College	Yes	1992–1994	A+
32	James Breuer	OF	Century High School	Yes	1993–1995	A+
33	Ken Sikes	1B	Middle Georgia College	Yes	1993–1996	A+
34	Ryan Topham	OF	Portage Central High School	No; White Sox-1995	1995–1997	AA
35	Joe Vogelsang	RHP	Eastern Kentucky University	Yes	1992–1996	A+
36	John Collins	RHP	Thompson High School	No		
37	Mike Serbalik	2B	Siena College	Yes	1992	A-
38	Sheldon Anderson	OF	Washington High School	No		
39	Cliff Anderson	SS	Chapman University	Yes	1992–1998	AAA
40	Twaino Moss	OF	Middle Georgia College	No		
41	Greg Ziesemer	RHP	Larkin High School	No		
42	Ken Chapman	1B	Florida Southern College	Yes	1992	A-
43	David Hayman	OF	Hillcrest Christian School	No	1996	Rookie
44	Chris Apodaca	RHP	Lynwood High School	No		
45	Brian Clark	C	Napa Valley College	Yes	1993	Rookie
46	Dimas Padilla	LHP		No		
47	Jeff Poor	C	El Segundo High School	No; Giants-1994	1994–1998	AA
48	Stephen Munroe	OF	Crescent High School	No		
49	Nathan Dunn	SS	East Tennessee State University	Yes	1992–1993	A+
50	Tyler Boulo	3B	St. Paul's Episcopal School	No; Padres-1996	1996	Rookie
