= Juan Guerrero =

Dominican baseball player (born 1967)

- Infielder
- Born: February 1, 1967 (age 58); San José de los Llanos, Dominican Republic
- Batted: Right Threw: Right

MLB debut
- April 9, 1992, for the Houston Astros

Last MLB appearance
- October 3, 1992, for the Houston Astros

MLB statistics
- Batting average: .200
- Home runs: 1
- Runs batted in: 14

CPBL statistics
- Batting average: .258
- Home runs: 12
- Runs batted in: 39
- Stats at Baseball Reference

Teams
- Houston Astros (1992); China Times Eagles (1997)

Juan Antonio Guerrero de la Cruz (born February 1, 1967) is a Dominican former professional baseball player. He played 79 games for the Major League Baseball Houston Astros in 1992, mostly as an infielder.
