= Marvin Freeman =

American baseball player (born 1963)

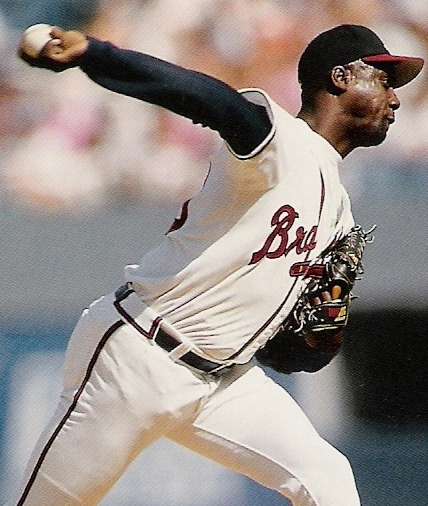
- Pitcher
- Born: April 10, 1963 (age 63); Chicago, Illinois, U.S.
- Batted: Right Threw: Right

MLB debut
- September 16, 1986, for the Philadelphia Phillies

Last MLB appearance
- September 14, 1996, for the Chicago White Sox

MLB statistics
- Win–loss record: 35–28
- Earned run average: 4.64
- Strikeouts: 383
- Stats at Baseball Reference

Teams
- Philadelphia Phillies (1986, 1988–1990); Atlanta Braves (1990–1993); Colorado Rockies (1994–1996); Chicago White Sox (1996)

Marvin Freeman (born April 10, 1963) is an American former professional baseball pitcher. He played in Major League Baseball (MLB) from 1986 to 1996 for the Philadelphia Phillies, Atlanta Braves and Colorado Rockies. He worked as both a starting pitcher and a reliever in his career.

== Biography ==
Nicknamed "Starvin' Marvin" for weighing 180 pounds on a 6–6 frame, Freeman worked at Chicago's John Norwood Lee Co. making concert-quality violin bows, while attending Chicago Vocational High School. Freeman played collegiately at Jackson State University. In 1983, he played collegiate summer baseball with the Chatham A's of the Cape Cod Baseball League. He was selected in the second round of the 1984 MLB draft by the Philadelphia Phillies as the 49th pick. He made his MLB debut in 1986 and won his first game against the New York Mets on September 21, 1986. Freeman won his first career decision (second start) on the day his first child was born.

Freeman began his professional career in 1984 after being drafted by the Philadelphia Phillies in the second round of that year's amateur draft out of Jackson State University. He was originally drafted by the Montreal Expos in the ninth round of the '81 draft, but did not sign. Freeman debuted that year in short-season A-ball for Bend of the Northwest league, going 8-5 with a 2.61 ERA. He allowed just 64 hits in 89.2 innings, but did walk 5.2 batters per nine. That would be a continuing theme throughout Marvin's minor league career, as he never posted a K/BB ratio higher than 1.74, and often walked more batters than he struck out – such as in 1985 at Reading, where after getting promoted to AA, he proceeded to walk 52 batters while striking out just 35. Still, the Phillies saw something in the young righty, as he was more or less unhittable during his first few years in the minors.

After posting a win–loss record of 13–6 and an ERA of 4.03 in 27 starts in AA in 1986, Freeman got the call to join the big club, debuting with the Phillies on September 16. Across three starts, he went 2-0 with a 2.25 ERA, despite walking more batters (10) than he struck out (8). His first win also came on the same day that his first daughter was born. Freeman would spend three and a half more seasons with the Phillies organization, bouncing between AAA and the majors (and throwing a no-hitter for the Maine Guides in the process), before being traded to the Atlanta Braves for Joe Boever before the deadline in 1990.

During his time with the Braves, Freeman began to find a level of control that he never previously experienced during his professional career, as he posted a K/BB ratio of over 2-to-1 for the first time. He was also used primarily as a reliever, which brought a decent amount of success to the lanky right-hander in his late-20s. He made 101 regular season appearances for Atlanta from 1990–92, accruing a 9-5 record with a 3.16 ERA with 87 strikeouts compared to 45 walks. He was a solid contributor to two teams that went to the World Series, though he didn't have great success in the postseason (14.73 ERA in 3 appearances during the '92 NLCS). Freeman had a down year in 1993, as his ERA rose to 6.08 and he only pitched in 21 games, partly due to injuries. He was released by the Braves after the season, and signed by the Colorado Rockies four days later.

Despite not starting a single game since 1990, Freeman won a spot in the starting rotation for the Rockies heading into 1994 after Kent Bottenfield broke his hand in late February. Freeman finished the '94 season with a 10-2 record and a 2.80 ERA. Had he pitched enough innings to qualify, that ERA would have been second behind only Greg Maddux, who unanimously won the Cy Young Award that season. Freeman finished fourth in the voting – the highest finish by any Rockies pitcher until 2010 when Ubaldo Jimenez finished third. One of the more special moments of that season for Freeman came in a June 13 game against the Braves at Fulton County Stadium, in which for the first time in 17 tries, the Rockies finally beat the Braves behind Freeman, who outdueled Tom Glavine by going seven innings and allowing just one run on eight hits while striking out three. However, Freeman's stellar season was cut short by the 1994 MLB players' strike.

Freeman was battling a sore elbow going into the 1995 season, and it affected his results on the field. His ERA sat at 8.53 after the first month of the season, and when he was demoted to the bullpen at the end of July, he sported a 3-7 record with a 5.90 ERA. Freeman would make one more spot start in Atlanta in August, but exited after just 2.1 innings and landed on the DL. He made two more relief appearances upon his return, and finished the season with a 5.89 ERA and had surgery on his elbow, forcing him to miss the Rockies' short inaugural postseason run.

Freeman found himself back in the rotation at the onset of the 1996 campaign, and the results were a little better at first, but gradually got worse as the season wore on. His best outing came on June 12 at Coors Field against the Houston Astros, as he went seven scoreless innings and, along with relievers Darren Holmes and Ryan Hawblitzel, combined for the Rockies' first shutout at Coors Field in 103 games in an 8-0 victory. Freeman was 6-4 with a 5.04 ERA through June of '96, but he experienced a terrible second half (which allegedly included an incident at a "Jim Rome Tour Stop" on July 18, in which he supposedly made an obscene gesture and threw a baseball in Rome's direction) and finished the season with the Rockies with a 7-9 record and a 6.04 ERA. Colorado placed him on waivers at the end of August, and he was claimed by his hometown White Sox, with whom he made just one uninspiring start there.

Freeman became a free agent at the end of the '96 season and tried to catch on with the Toronto Blue Jays in the spring of 1997. However, he would pitch just one inning for their AAA affiliate before ending his career.

Freeman was best known as an electric clubhouse figure during his days with the Rockies. He once commented, "Look to me as the clubhouse WD-40 – the lubricant. When it's tight around here, I like to draw attention to myself, and maybe that'll help some of the other guys relax. I love attention." Still, Rockies fans will always remember his terrific 1994 season for an upstart club, as evidenced by their playoff berth the next year. He finished the 1994 season with a 10–2 win–loss record and a 2.80 ERA, which still stands as a Rockies record.

Freeman is married and has a daughter and son.
