= Joe Boever =

American baseball player (born 1960)

- Relief pitcher
- Born: October 4, 1960 (age 65); Kirkwood, Missouri, U.S.
- Batted: Right Threw: Right

MLB debut
- July 19, 1985, for the St. Louis Cardinals

Last MLB appearance
- September 29, 1996, for the Pittsburgh Pirates

MLB statistics
- Win–loss record: 34–45
- Earned run average: 3.93
- Strikeouts: 541
- Saves: 49
- Stats at Baseball Reference

Teams
- St. Louis Cardinals (1985–1986); Atlanta Braves (1987–1990); Philadelphia Phillies (1990–1991); Houston Astros (1992); Oakland Athletics (1993); Detroit Tigers (1993–1995); Pittsburgh Pirates (1996)

Joseph Martin Boever (/ˈbeɪvər/ BAY-vər; born October 4, 1960) is an American former professional baseball right-handed relief pitcher who played in Major League Baseball (MLB) from 1985 to 1996 for the St. Louis Cardinals, Atlanta Braves, Philadelphia Phillies, Houston Astros, Oakland Athletics, Detroit Tigers, and Pittsburgh Pirates.

== Early career ==
Boever pitched for Lindbergh High School in St. Louis, graduating in 1979. He pitched for three colleges, one of which was UNLV, before being signed as an undrafted free agent by the St. Louis Cardinals on June 25, 1982.

== Major league reliever ==
Boever made his major league debut for the St. Louis Cardinals on July 19, 1985, and would go on to appear in 24 games over the next two seasons.

On July 24, 1987, Boever was traded to the Atlanta Braves for pitcher Randy O'Neal.

A career reliever, Boever was most notable for throwing a palmball pitch. Nicknamed "Boever The Saver", he was a closer for the 1989 Atlanta Braves, collecting 21 saves. In 1992, he led the league in appearances for a pitcher, playing in 81 games for the Houston Astros. Boever retired in 1997.

== See also ==
- Houston Astros award winners and league leaders
