= Jimmy Jones (baseball) =

American baseball player (born 1964)

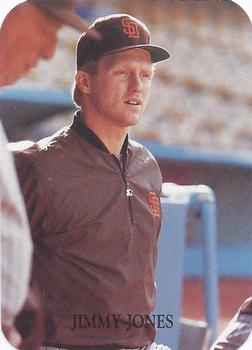
- Pitcher
- Born: April 20, 1964 (age 62); Dallas, Texas, U.S.
- Batted: Right Threw: Right

Professional debut
- MLB: September 21, 1986, for the San Diego Padres
- NPB: April 14, 1994, for the Yomiuri Giants

Last appearance
- MLB: July 5, 1993, for the Montreal Expos
- NPB: May 31, 1995, for the Yomiuri Giants

MLB statistics
- Win–loss record: 43–39
- Earned run average: 4.46
- Strikeouts: 376

NPB statistics
- Win–loss record: 9–4
- Earned run average: 3.75
- Strikeouts: 51
- Stats at Baseball Reference

Teams
- San Diego Padres (1986–1988); New York Yankees (1989–1990); Houston Astros (1991–1992); Montreal Expos (1993); Yomiuri Giants (1994–1995)

James Condia Jones (born April 20, 1964) is an American professional baseball coach, and former pitcher. He played eight seasons in Major League Baseball (MLB) with the San Diego Padres, New York Yankees, Houston Astros, and Montreal Expos, and two seasons in Nippon Professional Baseball (NPB) with the Yomiuri Giants in 1994 and 1995. Jones is the assistant pitching coach for the El Paso Chihuahuas, the Padres' Triple-A minor league baseball affiliate.

== Playing career ==
Jones was selected in the first round (third overall) of the 1982 Major League Baseball draft by the Padres out of Thomas Jefferson High School in Dallas, Texas. While in high school, Jones struck out 28 batters in a 16-inning playoff game while throwing 251 pitches. His team lost to Texarkana. Jones later said that his arm was so sore two days after the marathon effort that he could not throw a baseball from third base to first base.

Jones threw a one-hit shutout against the first-place Houston Astros in his big league debut on September 21, 1986. He was the first pitcher to throw a one-hitter in his debut game since Billy Rohr in 1967. After the game, two Padres outfielders, Tony Gwynn and Kevin McReynolds, regretted being unable to catch the only hit, a single by Houston pitcher Bob Knepper, as doing so would have given Jones a perfect game.

Jones went 18–21 with the Padres over the next two seasons, 1987 and 1988. San Diego traded him, Lance McCullers, and Stan Jefferson to the New York Yankees for Jack Clark and Pat Clements on October 24, 1988.

== Coaching ==
Jones began working as pitching coach in the San Diego Padres minor league system in 2009. He served as the interim bullpen coach for the San Diego Padres for part of the 2012 season, following the death of Darrel Akerfelds. Willie Blair replaced Jones in December 2012.

Jones was the pitching coach for the Peoria Padres of the Arizona League, the San Antonio Missions and Amarillo Sod Poodles of the Texas League, and Fort Wayne TinCaps. In 2023, he became the assistant pitching coach of the Triple-A El Paso Chihuahuas.
