= Frank Fultz =

American baseball player and coach

Frank Fultz (born November 18, 1951, in Chicago) was the manager of the Rookie-class Kingsport Mets in 2011 and was the strength and conditioning coach for the U.S.-based Atlanta Braves baseball team. He held the position since 1992, and resigned in June 2008. He was replaced by Phil Falco.
