= Doug Jones (baseball) =

American baseball player (1957–2021)

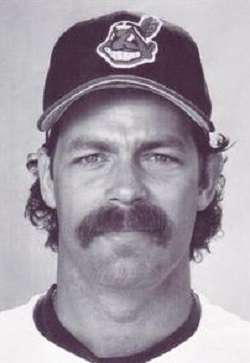
- Jones with the Cleveland Indians in 1987
- Pitcher
- Born: June 24, 1957; Covina, California, U.S.
- Died: November 22, 2021 (aged 64); Tucson, Arizona, U.S.
- Batted: Right Threw: Right

MLB debut
- April 9, 1982, for the Milwaukee Brewers

Last MLB appearance
- September 29, 2000, for the Oakland Athletics

MLB statistics
- Win–loss record: 69–79
- Earned run average: 3.30
- Strikeouts: 909
- Saves: 303
- Stats at Baseball Reference

Teams
- Milwaukee Brewers (1982); Cleveland Indians (1986–1991); Houston Astros (1992–1993); Philadelphia Phillies (1994); Baltimore Orioles (1995); Chicago Cubs (1996); Milwaukee Brewers (1996–1998); Cleveland Indians (1998); Oakland Athletics (1999–2000)

Career highlights and awards
- 5× All-Star (1988–1990, 1992, 1994)

Douglas Reid Jones (June 24, 1957 – November 22, 2021) was an American professional baseball player. During a 16-year career in Major League Baseball as a relief pitcher, he played for the Milwaukee Brewers (1982, 1996–1998), Cleveland Indians (1986–1991, 1998), Houston Astros (1992–1993), Philadelphia Phillies (1994), Baltimore Orioles (1995), Chicago Cubs (1996) and Oakland Athletics (1999–2000). Jones was a five-time MLB All-Star and a member of the 300 save club.

== Early life ==
Douglas Reid Jones was born on June 24, 1957, in Covina, California. He moved to Lebanon, Indiana, with his family as a young child. He attended Central Arizona College, and the Milwaukee Brewers selected him in the third round of the January phase of the 1978 MLB draft.

== Playing career ==
Jones spent seven years in the Brewers' minor league system. His only major league experience with the Brewers took place in four games in 1982. He was released after the 1984 season, and he signed with the Cleveland Indians. He became the Indians' full-time closer by 1988, breaking the Indians' record for saves in a season with 37. He held the Indians' all-time record for saves with 129 until Bob Wickman broke it on May 7, 2006.

Before the 1992 season, Jones signed a minor league contract with the Houston Astros. After the 1993 season, the Astros traded Jones and Jeff Juden to the Philadelphia Phillies for Mitch Williams. A free agent after the 1994 season, he signed a one-year, $1 million contract with the Baltimore Orioles. Jones threw an immaculate inning during a save on September 23, 1997, by striking out Johnny Damon, Scott Cooper, and Rod Myers of the Kansas City Royals.

Jones announced his retirement on December 7, 2000. His 303 career saves ranked 12th in major league history upon his retirement, and his 846 career appearances ranked 21st. A changeup specialist, he was known for keeping hitters off balance by throwing extremely slow pitches. He threw a two-seam fastball that topped out at speeds in the low-to-mid 80s mph range and a knuckle curve on occasion.

Jones made the American League All-Star team three times (1988, 1989, and 1990) and the National League All-Star team twice (1992 and 1994). He was the oldest player in the American League in 2000, at the age of 43.

== Coaching career ==
In 2009, Jones coached Pusch Ridge Christian Academy to the Arizona 2A High School Championship. In the early 2010s, he was the pitching coach for San Diego Christian College.

On January 22, 2015, he was named pitching coach for the Boise Hawks, a minor league affiliate of the Colorado Rockies.

== Death ==
Jones died from COVID-19 related complications in Arizona on November 22, 2021, at the age of 64.

== See also ==
- Houston Astros award winners and league leaders
- List of Major League Baseball career games finished leaders
- List of Major League Baseball pitchers who have thrown an immaculate inning
