= Xavier Hernandez (baseball) =

American baseball player (born 1965)

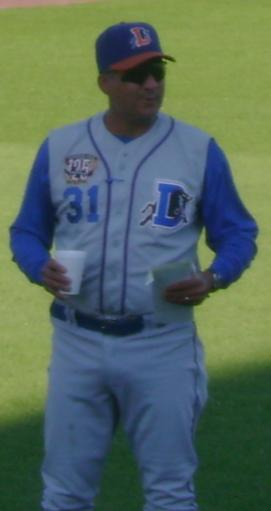
- Pitcher
- Born: August 16, 1965 (age 61); Port Arthur, Texas, U.S.
- Batted: Left Threw: Right

MLB debut
- June 4, 1989, for the Toronto Blue Jays

Last MLB appearance
- September 26, 1998, for the Texas Rangers

MLB statistics
- Win–loss record: 40–35
- Earned run average: 3.90
- Strikeouts: 562
- Stats at Baseball Reference

Teams
- Toronto Blue Jays (1989); Houston Astros (1990–1993); New York Yankees (1994); Cincinnati Reds (1995–1996); Houston Astros (1996); Texas Rangers (1997–1998)

Francis Xavier Hernandez (born August 16, 1965) is an American college baseball coach and former Major League Baseball pitcher. He played college baseball at University of Southwestern Louisiana from 1984 to 1986 before pitching in the major leagues, primarily as a relief pitcher, from 1989 to 1998. He returned to coach in the professional ranks in the Tampa Bay Rays minor league system from 2002 to 2010, as the pitching coach for the Charleston RiverDogs (2002-2004), Montgomery Biscuits (2005-2006) and Durham Bulls (2007-2010).

== Amateur career ==
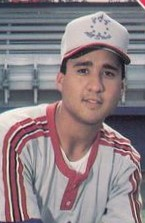
Hernandez with the Myrtle Beach Blue Jays in 1988

Hernandez played high school baseball at Thomas Jefferson High School in Port Arthur, Texas, where he led the Yellow Jackets to a 5-A State Title in 1983 with a 19-1 W/L record and was named the Texas High School Player of the Year. He attended and pitched for the University of Southwestern Louisiana (University of Louisiana-Lafayette) Ragin Cajuns. In 1985, he played collegiate summer baseball for the Orleans Cardinals of the Cape Cod Baseball League. He was selected by the Toronto Blue Jays in the 4th round of the 1986 MLB draft.

== Professional career ==
Hernandez pitched in the Major Leagues for the Blue Jays (1989), Houston Astros (1990–1994), New York Yankees (1994-1995), Cincinnati Reds (1995–1996), Houston Astros (1996-1997) and Texas Rangers (1997–1998). He posted a career 40-35 record with 35 saves and a 3.90 ERA. His best year came with the Houston Astros in 1992 when he posted a 9-1 record with 7 saves and a 2.11 ERA.
