= Pete Harnisch =

American baseball player (born 1966)

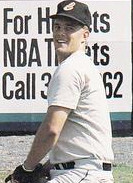
- Harnisch in 1988
- Pitcher
- Born: September 23, 1966 (age 60); Commack, New York, U.S.
- Batted: Switch Threw: Right

MLB debut
- September 13, 1988, for the Baltimore Orioles

Last MLB appearance
- May 7, 2001, for the Cincinnati Reds

MLB statistics
- Win–loss Record: 111–103
- Earned run average: 3.89
- Strikeouts: 1,368
- Stats at Baseball Reference

Teams
- Baltimore Orioles (1988–1990); Houston Astros (1991–1994); New York Mets (1995–1997); Milwaukee Brewers (1997); Cincinnati Reds (1998–2001)

Career highlights and awards
- All-Star (1991)

Peter Thomas Harnisch (born September 23, 1966) is an American former Major League Baseball right-handed pitcher. He played in college at Fordham University from 1984 through 1987, and was an All-American pitcher. He played in Major League Baseball from 1988 through 2001 for the Baltimore Orioles, Houston Astros, New York Mets, Milwaukee Brewers and Cincinnati Reds.

== Baltimore Orioles ==
Harnisch studied accounting, and was a star pitcher at Fordham University, compiling a 21–3 college record, 2.29 earned run average and 213 strikeouts in 204 innings pitched. He was a supplemental first-round pick (27th overall) for the Baltimore Orioles in the 1987 Major League Baseball draft. Just over a year after signing with Baltimore, Harnisch made his major league debut as a September call-up in 1988. He was 0–2 in two starts with a 5.54 ERA. He struck out Dwight Evans for his first Major League strikeout. Harnisch spent two more seasons with the Orioles, splitting both seasons between Baltimore and their triple A affiliate, the Rochester Red Wings.

== Houston Astros ==
In a transaction considered by Orioles fans as the worst in team history according to Thom Loverro, Harnisch was traded along with Steve Finley and Curt Schilling to the Houston Astros for Glenn Davis on January 10, 1991. He joined an Astros organization that was for sale and lightening its payroll by going with younger, inexpensive players.

Harnisch suffered from a lack of run support upon his arrival in Houston. Despite leading the National League (NL) with a 2.22 ERA, his record stood at 5–7 leading into the 1991 MLB All-Star Game. NL manager Lou Piniella added Harnisch to his squad regardless of his losing record, and Harnisch pitched a scoreless sixth inning in the NL's 4–2 loss.

On September 6, 1991, Harnisch threw an immaculate inning, striking out all three batters on nine total pitches in the ninth inning of a 3–1 win over the Philadelphia Phillies; he became the 17th National League pitcher and the 26th pitcher in major-league history to accomplish this feat. Harnisch went 7–2 after the break to end the season at 12–9. He led the league with a .212 batting average against and 7.020 hits per nine innings pitched.

Astros manager Art Howe named Harnisch his 1992 opening day starter. Harnisch pitched well, giving up just two runs in the eighth to the Atlanta Braves, however, the Astros were held to just two hits by Braves starter Tom Glavine, and Harnish took the loss. His best season was 1993, when he went 16–9 with a 2.98 ERA and 185 strikeouts while tying the Chicago White Sox's Jack McDowell with a major league leading four shutouts and leading the NL for a second time with a .214 batting average against and 7.070 hits allowed per nine innings pitched.

A torn tendon in his pitching arm caused Harnisch to miss the entire month of June 1994, and limited him to just 17 starts all season. Following the season, he was traded to the New York Mets. During his four seasons in Houston, Harnisch compiled a 45–33 record and a 3.41 ERA.

== New York Mets ==
Harnisch's first season in New York City did not go well, as he went 2–8 with a 3.68 ERA in eighteen starts. His record improved to 8–12 in 31 starts in 1996, although he drew an eight-game suspension for his part in a brawl with the Chicago Cubs on May 11.

Harnisch quit chewing tobacco during Spring training 1997. Shortly afterwards, he complained to Mets trainer Fred Hina of sleeplessness and a lost appetite. Hina prescribed sleeping pills for Harnisch prior to his opening day start for the Mets against the San Diego Padres. After pitching five scoreless innings, Harnisch was pulled after starting the sixth inning by giving up consecutive home runs to Chris Gomez, Rickey Henderson and Quilvio Veras. He was pulled from his next scheduled start on April 6, and sent back to New York for tests. Following which, he received a diagnosis of clinical depression.

He revealed his condition in a conference call with sportswriters later that month, and began a rehabilitation program that kept him from the Mets' line-up for four months. He returned to the Mets on August 5, pitching six innings and giving up two runs to the St. Louis Cardinals at Shea Stadium. He was, however, far less effective in his next three starts, and was 0–1 with an 8.24 ERA when manager Bobby Valentine moved him into the bullpen.

== Cincinnati Reds ==
Harnisch made three starts and one relief appearance for Milwaukee, and signed with the Cincinnati Reds as a free agent following the season. He enjoyed something of a renaissance with the Reds in 1998, going 14–7 with a 3.14 ERA for a team that went 77–85 and finished in fourth place in the National League Central. The club improved considerably in 1999 with Harnisch leading the club in wins (16), innings pitched (198.1) and shutouts (2). His sixteenth victory came on October 3 in the 162nd game of the season against the Brewers to improve his club's record to 96–66, and end the season tied with the Mets for the National League's wild card. The Mets won a one-game playoff at Cinergy Field the following day.

Harnisch spent two more seasons in Cincinnati. Injuries limited him to just seven starts in 2001. After sitting out the entire 2002 season, he attempted a comeback with the Reds' triple A affiliate, the Louisville Bats in 2003, but was unsuccessful.

== Post-playing career ==
In November 2012, Harnisch was hired by the Los Angeles Angels of Anaheim to be a roving pitching instructor.

== Personal life ==
As of 2009, Harnisch lives in Colts Neck, New Jersey, with his wife, Donna, and two sons, Jack and Nick.

Harnisch was inducted into the Suffolk Sports Hall of Fame on Long Island, New York, in the Baseball Category with the Class of 2009.

== Career stats ==
W	L	PCT	ERA	G	GS	CG	SHO	SV	IP	H	ER	R	HR	BB	K	WP	HBP	BAA	Fld%
111	103	.519	3.89	321	318	24	11	0	1959	1822	846	926	223	716	1368	50	49	.245	.953

Preceded by Tom Glavine	NL Shutouts Leader; 1993	Succeeded by Greg Maddux
Preceded by Sid Fernandez; Curt Schilling	NL Hits per nine innings Leader; 1991; 1993	Succeeded by Curt Schilling; Greg Maddux
Preceded by Sid Fernandez; Curt Schilling	NL Batting average against Leader; 1991; 1993	Succeeded by Curt Schilling; Greg Maddux

== See also ==
- Houston Astros award winners and league leaders
