= 1992 Major League Baseball season =

1992 MLB season
- League: Major League Baseball
- Sport: Baseball
- Duration: April 6 – October 24, 1992
- Games: 162
- Teams: 26
- TV partner(s): CBS; ESPN

Draft
- Top draft pick: Phil Nevin
- Picked by: Houston Astros

Regular Season
- Season MVP: AL: Dennis Eckersley (OAK); NL: Barry Bonds (PIT)

Postseason
- AL champions: Toronto Blue Jays
- AL runners-up: Oakland Athletics
- NL champions: Atlanta Braves
- NL runners-up: Pittsburgh Pirates

World Series
- Champions: Toronto Blue Jays
- Runners-up: Atlanta Braves
- World Series MVP: Pat Borders (TOR)

MLB seasons
- ← 1991 1993 →

Locations of teams for the 1992–1993 American League seasons
West East
Locations of teams for the 1977–1992 National League seasons
West East

The 1992 Major League Baseball season saw the Toronto Blue Jays defeat the Atlanta Braves in the World Series, becoming the first team outside the United States to win the World Series.

A resurgence in pitching dominance occurred during this season. On average, one out of every seven games pitched this season was a shutout; in 2,106 MLB regular-season games, 298 shutouts were pitched (up from 272 in 2,104 regular-season games in 1991). Two teams pitched at least 20 shutouts each; the Atlanta Braves led the Majors with 24 and the Pittsburgh Pirates finished second with 20. In the National League, no team hit more than 138 home runs and no team scored 700 runs. The San Francisco Giants were shut out 18 times, the most in the Majors. The effect was similar in the American League. In 1991, two AL teams had scored at least 800 runs and three had collected 1,500 hits. In 1992, no team scored 800 runs and only one reached 1,500 hits. The California Angels were shut out 15 times, the most in the AL.

== Awards and honors ==
- Baseball Hall of Fame
  - Rollie Fingers
  - Bill McGowan
  - Hal Newhouser
  - Tom Seaver

Baseball Writers' Association of America Awards
BBWAA Award	National League	American League
Rookie of the Year	Eric Karros (LAD)	Pat Listach (MIL)
Cy Young Award	Greg Maddux (CHC)	Dennis Eckersley (OAK)
Manager of the Year	Jim Leyland (PIT)	Tony La Russa (OAK)
Most Valuable Player	Barry Bonds (PIT)	Dennis Eckersley (OAK)
Gold Glove Awards
Position	National League	American League
Pitcher	Greg Maddux (CHC)	Mark Langston (CAL)
Catcher	Tom Pagnozzi (STL)	Iván Rodríguez (TEX)
First Baseman	Mark Grace (CHC)	Don Mattingly (NYY)
Second Baseman	José Lind (PIT)	Roberto Alomar (TOR)
Third Baseman	Terry Pendleton (ATL)	Robin Ventura (CWS)
Shortstop	Ozzie Smith (STL)	Cal Ripken Jr. (BAL)
Outfielders	Barry Bonds (PIT)	Kirby Puckett (MIN)
Outfielders	Larry Walker (MON)	Devon White (TOR)
Outfielders	Andy Van Slyke (PIT)	Ken Griffey Jr. (SEA)
Silver Slugger Awards
Pitcher/Designated Hitter	Dwight Gooden (NYM)	Dave Winfield (TOR)
Catcher	Darren Daulton (PHI)	Mickey Tettleton (DET)
First Baseman	Fred McGriff (SD)	Mark McGwire (OAK)
Second Baseman	Ryne Sandberg (CHC)	Roberto Alomar (TOR)
Third Baseman	Gary Sheffield (SD)	Edgar Martínez (SEA)
Shortstop	Barry Larkin (CIN)	Travis Fryman (DET)
Outfielders	Barry Bonds (PIT)	Joe Carter (TOR)
Outfielders	Andy Van Slyke (PIT)	Juan González (TEX)
Outfielders	Larry Walker (MON)	Kirby Puckett (MIN)

=== Other awards ===
- Outstanding Designated Hitter Award: Dave Winfield (TOR)
- Roberto Clemente Award (Humanitarian): Cal Ripken Jr. (BAL)
- Rolaids Relief Man Award: Dennis Eckersley (OAK, American); Lee Smith (STL, National)

=== Player of the Month ===
Month	American League	National League
April	Roberto Alomar	Barry Bonds
May	Kirby Puckett	Félix José
June	Kirby Puckett	Cory Snyder
July	Edgar Martínez	Brett Butler
August	Edgar Martínez	Gary Sheffield
September	Frank Thomas	Barry Bonds

=== Pitcher of the Month ===
Month	American League	National League
April	Bill Krueger	Bill Swift
May	Roger Clemens	Mike Morgan
June	John Smiley	Randy Tomlin
July	Kevin Appier	Tom Glavine
August	Roger Clemens	Dennis Martínez
September	Cal Eldred	José Rijo

== Statistical leaders ==
Statistic	American League		National League	
AVG	Edgar Martínez SEA	.343	Gary Sheffield SD	.330
HR	Juan González TEX	43	Fred McGriff SD	35
RBI	Cecil Fielder DET	124	Darren Daulton PHI	109
Wins	Kevin Brown TEX; Jack Morris TOR	21	Tom Glavine ATL; Greg Maddux CHC	20
ERA	Roger Clemens BOS	2.41	Bill Swift SF	2.08
SO	Randy Johnson SEA	241	John Smoltz ATL	215
SV	Dennis Eckersley OAK	51	Lee Smith STL	43
SB	Kenny Lofton CLE	66	Marquis Grissom MON	78

== Standings ==
=== American League ===
AL East
Team	W	L	Pct.	GB	Home	Road
Toronto Blue Jays	96	66	.593	—	53‍–‍28	43‍–‍38
Milwaukee Brewers	92	70	.568	4	53‍–‍28	39‍–‍42
Baltimore Orioles	89	73	.549	7	43‍–‍38	46‍–‍35
Cleveland Indians	76	86	.469	20	41‍–‍40	35‍–‍46
New York Yankees	76	86	.469	20	41‍–‍40	35‍–‍46
Detroit Tigers	75	87	.463	21	38‍–‍42	37‍–‍45
Boston Red Sox	73	89	.451	23	44‍–‍37	29‍–‍52

AL West
Team	W	L	Pct.	GB	Home	Road
Oakland Athletics	96	66	.593	—	51‍–‍30	45‍–‍36
Minnesota Twins	90	72	.556	6	48‍–‍33	42‍–‍39
Chicago White Sox	86	76	.531	10	50‍–‍32	36‍–‍44
Texas Rangers	77	85	.475	19	36‍–‍45	41‍–‍40
California Angels	72	90	.444	24	41‍–‍40	31‍–‍50
Kansas City Royals	72	90	.444	24	44‍–‍37	28‍–‍53
Seattle Mariners	64	98	.395	32	38‍–‍43	26‍–‍55

=== National League ===
NL East
Team	W	L	Pct.	GB	Home	Road
Pittsburgh Pirates	96	66	.593	—	53‍–‍28	43‍–‍38
Montreal Expos	87	75	.537	9	43‍–‍38	44‍–‍37
St. Louis Cardinals	83	79	.512	13	45‍–‍36	38‍–‍43
Chicago Cubs	78	84	.481	18	43‍–‍38	35‍–‍46
New York Mets	72	90	.444	24	41‍–‍40	31‍–‍50
Philadelphia Phillies	70	92	.432	26	41‍–‍40	29‍–‍52

NL West
Team	W	L	Pct.	GB	Home	Road
Atlanta Braves	98	64	.605	—	51‍–‍30	47‍–‍34
Cincinnati Reds	90	72	.556	8	53‍–‍28	37‍–‍44
San Diego Padres	82	80	.506	16	45‍–‍36	37‍–‍44
Houston Astros	81	81	.500	17	47‍–‍34	34‍–‍47
San Francisco Giants	72	90	.444	26	42‍–‍39	30‍–‍51
Los Angeles Dodgers	63	99	.389	35	37‍–‍44	26‍–‍55

== Postseason ==
=== Bracket ===
League Championship Series (ALCS, NLCS)
East	Toronto	4
West	Oakland	2
East	Pittsburgh	3
West	Atlanta	4

World Series
AL	Toronto	4
NL	Atlanta	2

== Managers ==
=== American League ===
Team	Manager	Comments
Baltimore Orioles±	Johnny Oates	
Boston Red Sox	Butch Hobson	
California Angels	Buck Rodgers	After a May bus accident John Wathan was acting manager for the remainder of the season
Chicago White Sox	Gene Lamont	
Cleveland Indians	Mike Hargrove	
Detroit Tigers	Sparky Anderson	
Kansas City Royals	Hal McRae	
Milwaukee Brewers	Phil Garner	
Minnesota Twins	Tom Kelly	
New York Yankees	Buck Showalter	
Oakland Athletics	Tony La Russa	Won AL West
Seattle Mariners	Bill Plummer	
Texas Rangers	Bobby Valentine	Was replaced during the season by Toby Harrah
Toronto Blue Jays	Cito Gaston	Won the World Series

=== National League ===
Team	Manager	Comments
Atlanta Braves	Bobby Cox	Won the National League pennant
Chicago Cubs	Jim Lefebvre	
Cincinnati Reds	Lou Piniella	
Houston Astros	Art Howe	
Los Angeles Dodgers	Tommy Lasorda	
Montreal Expos	Tom Runnells	Was replaced during the season by Felipe Alou
New York Mets	Jeff Torborg	
Philadelphia Phillies	Jim Fregosi	
Pittsburgh Pirates	Jim Leyland	Won NL East
St. Louis Cardinals	Joe Torre	
San Diego Padres±	Jim Riggleman	
San Francisco Giants	Roger Craig	

== Home field attendance and payroll ==
Team name	Wins	%±	Home attendance	%±	Per game	Est. payroll	%±
Toronto Blue Jays	96	5.5%	4,028,318	0.7%	49,732	$44,788,666	125.0%
Baltimore Orioles	89	32.8%	3,567,819	39.8%	44,047	$23,891,667	36.4%
Atlanta Braves	98	4.3%	3,077,400	43.8%	37,993	$34,625,333	88.1%
Chicago White Sox	86	−1.1%	2,681,156	−8.6%	32,697	$30,160,833	78.3%
Oakland Athletics	96	14.3%	2,494,160	−8.1%	30,792	$41,035,000	10.9%
Minnesota Twins	90	−5.3%	2,482,428	8.2%	30,647	$28,027,834	20.0%
Los Angeles Dodgers	63	−32.3%	2,473,266	−26.1%	30,534	$44,788,166	36.6%
Boston Red Sox	73	−13.1%	2,468,574	−3.7%	30,476	$43,610,584	24.0%
St. Louis Cardinals	83	−1.2%	2,418,483	−1.2%	29,858	$27,583,836	26.2%
Cincinnati Reds	90	21.6%	2,315,946	−2.4%	28,592	$33,431,499	27.1%
Texas Rangers	77	−9.4%	2,198,231	−4.3%	27,139	$30,128,167	65.3%
Chicago Cubs	78	1.3%	2,126,720	−8.1%	26,256	$29,829,686	27.6%
California Angels	72	−11.1%	2,065,444	−14.5%	25,499	$34,749,334	5.1%
Philadelphia Phillies	70	−10.3%	1,927,448	−6.0%	23,796	$24,492,834	8.9%
Kansas City Royals	72	−12.2%	1,867,689	−13.6%	23,058	$33,893,834	28.8%
Milwaukee Brewers	92	10.8%	1,857,351	25.6%	22,930	$31,013,667	34.2%
Pittsburgh Pirates	96	−2.0%	1,829,395	−11.4%	22,585	$33,944,167	43.6%
New York Mets	72	−6.5%	1,779,534	−22.1%	21,970	$44,602,002	36.9%
New York Yankees	76	7.0%	1,748,737	−6.2%	21,589	$37,652,334	37.7%
San Diego Padres	82	−2.4%	1,721,406	−4.6%	21,252	$26,854,167	21.2%
Montreal Expos	87	22.5%	1,669,127	78.6%	20,607	$15,822,334	47.4%
Seattle Mariners	64	−22.9%	1,651,367	−23.1%	20,387	$23,304,833	48.5%
San Francisco Giants	72	−4.0%	1,560,998	−10.2%	19,272	$33,163,168	7.1%
Detroit Tigers	75	−10.7%	1,423,963	−13.3%	17,800	$27,322,834	14.6%
Cleveland Indians	76	33.3%	1,224,094	16.4%	15,112	$9,373,044	−46.8%
Houston Astros	81	24.6%	1,211,412	1.3%	14,956	$15,407,500	19.9%

== Television coverage ==
Network	Day of week	Announcers
CBS	Saturday afternoons	Sean McDonough, Tim McCarver, Dick Stockton, Jim Kaat
ESPN	Sunday nights Tuesday nights Wednesday nights Friday nights	Jon Miller, Joe Morgan See also: List of ESPN Major League Baseball broadcasters

== Events ==
=== January–June ===
- January 2 – The Boston Red Sox sign free agent pitcher Frank Viola.
- January 7 – Pitchers Tom Seaver and Rollie Fingers are elected to the Baseball Hall of Fame by the Baseball Writers' Association of America. Seaver finishes with a record 98.8% of the votes cast. Pete Rose, ineligible because of his ban from baseball (otherwise this year would have been his first year of eligibility), receives 41 write–in votes.
- January 31 – The Pittsburgh Pirates sign outfielder Barry Bonds to a one-year contract worth $4.7 million, the largest-ever one-year deal.
- February 20 – The Simpsons episode Homer at the Bat airs on the Fox Network, featuring guest appearances by Roger Clemens, Wade Boggs, Ken Griffey Jr., Steve Sax, Ozzie Smith, José Canseco, Don Mattingly, Darryl Strawberry, and Mike Scioscia.
- March 2 – Chicago Cubs second baseman Ryne Sandberg becomes the highest-paid player in major league history when he agrees to a four-year contract extension worth $28.4 million.
- March 17 – Pitcher Hal Newhouser and umpire Bill McGowan are elected to the Baseball Hall of Fame by the Veterans Committee.
- March 30 – In one of the biggest cross-town trades in Chicago baseball history, the Chicago Cubs trade George Bell to the Chicago White Sox, while the Sox send Sammy Sosa to the Cubs.
- April 6 – A crowd of 44,568 sees the Baltimore Orioles defeat the Cleveland Indians 2–0 in the first game at Oriole Park at Camden Yards. Rick Sutcliffe hurls the shutout for Baltimore.
- May 17 – The Minnesota Twins trade highly regarded pitching prospect Denny Neagle to the Pittsburgh Pirates for pitcher John Smiley.

=== July–December ===
- July 7 – Andy Van Slyke of the Pittsburgh Pirates becomes the first outfielder in nearly 18 years to record an unassisted double play, in the Pirates' 5–3 win over the Houston Astros. Van Slyke races in from center field to catch a fly ball, then continues in to double up Ken Caminiti, who was running from second base on the play.
- July 14 – The American League pounds out a record 19 hits in defeating the National League by a score of 13–6 in the All-Star Game. It is the AL's fifth straight win. Seattle Mariners outfielder Ken Griffey Jr., who hit a single, a double and a home run, is named the MVP, 12 years after his father Ken Sr. won the same honor.
- August 28 – The Milwaukee Brewers lash 31 hits in a 22–2 drubbing of the Toronto Blue Jays, setting a record for the most hits by a team in a single nine-inning game. Darryl Hamilton leads the way for the Brewers, going 4-for-7 with 5 RBI.
- September 7 – After receiving an 18–9 no-confidence vote from the owners, Commissioner Fay Vincent is forced to resign. Vincent is soon replaced by Milwaukee Brewers president Bud Selig on what is meant to be an interim basis.
- September 9 – Robin Yount becomes the 17th player to reach 3,000 hits in the Milwaukee Brewers' 5–4 loss to the Cleveland Indians. Yount singles to right center off Cleveland's José Mesa in the seventh inning.
- September 20 – Philadelphia Phillies second baseman Mickey Morandini completes the first unassisted triple play in the National League in 65 years against their in-state rivals, the Pittsburgh Pirates. In the bottom of the sixth inning, Morandini snares Jeff King's line drive, steps on second to double off Andy Van Slyke, and finally tags Barry Bonds out before he can return to first. It is the ninth unassisted triple play since 1901, but only the second to be pulled off by a second baseman.
- September 23 – Bip Roberts of the Cincinnati Reds hits safely in his tenth consecutive at-bat. He ends his streak later in the game against the Los Angeles Dodgers.
- September 26 – Bill Pecota becomes the first position player for the New York Mets to pitch in a game, giving up a home run in the 8th inning as the Pittsburgh Pirates defeat the Mets 19–2.
- September 27 – The Pittsburgh Pirates seal their third consecutive National League East championship with a 4–2 victory over the New York Mets.
- September 28 – The idle Oakland Athletics clinch their fourth American League West crown in five years when the second-place Minnesota Twins fall to the Chicago White Sox 9–4.
- September 29 – The Atlanta Braves wrap up the National League West with a 6–0 shutout of the San Francisco Giants.
- September 30 – George Brett of the Kansas City Royals becomes the 18th player to reach 3,000th hits, in an infield single off Tim Fortugno in the seventh inning of a 4–0 Royals victory over the California Angels.
- October 3 – The Toronto Blue Jays clinch their second straight American League East title with a 3–1 win over the Detroit Tigers.
- October 23 – The expansion Florida Marlins hire Rene Lachemann as the team's first manager.
- October 24 – The Toronto Blue Jays clinch their first World Series championship with a 4–3 win over the Atlanta Braves in Game 6. Dave Winfield's 2–out, 2–run double in the top of the 11th gives Toronto a 4–2 lead. The Braves score one run in the bottom half of the inning and have the tying run on 3rd when the final out is made. Jimmy Key wins the game in relief, and Candy Maldonado homers for Toronto. Blue Jays catcher Pat Borders, with a .450 batting average, is named the Series MVP. The Toronto Blue Jays finish the season without being swept in any series. They are the first team from outside the United States to win the World Series.
- October 27 – The expansion Colorado Rockies hire Don Baylor as the team's first manager.
- November 10 – In a 9–4 vote, the National League fails to get enough yes votes to approve a sale of the San Francisco Giants to Vince Naimoli, which would have resulted in a move of the team to St. Petersburg, Florida.
- November 10 – The Seattle Mariners hire Lou Piniella as their new manager.
- November 16 – The Rockies sign free agent first baseman Andrés Galarraga, who rejoins Don Baylor, his hitting coach with the St. Louis Cardinals. Galarraga is coming off his second injury-plagued year, having missed 44 days of the season after being hit on the wrist by a Wally Whitehurst pitch in the 3rd game of the season.
- November 17 – Major League Baseball holds an expansion draft to stock the rosters of the National League's two new teams, the Florida Marlins and Colorado Rockies. A total of 72 players are chosen. The best picks for Florida are Trevor Hoffman, eventually packaged for Gary Sheffield; Jeff Conine, and Cris Carpenter, later dealt to the Texas Rangers for Robb Nen. For Colorado, their best picks are Eric Young, Joe Girardi, Vinny Castilla, Armando Reynoso, Andy Ashby, Brad Ausmus, Charlie Hayes and Doug Bochtler. The next season, Ashby, Ausmus and Bochtler will go to the San Diego Padres in an ill-fated deal for pricey veteran pitchers Bruce Hurst and Greg Harris.

== Movies ==
- A League of Their Own
