= The Call (1985 World Series) =

Controversial decision made during 1985 World Series

The Call was a blown call made by umpire Don Denkinger in Game 6 of the 1985 World Series between the Kansas City Royals and St. Louis Cardinals on October 26, 1985 at Royals Stadium in Kansas City, Missouri. The Royals lost the first two games of the World Series at their home stadium and were on the verge of elimination, down 1–0 in the bottom of the ninth in Game 6, when Denkinger ruled Royals runner Jorge Orta safe at first. Television replays and photographs showed that Orta was out by half a step, and Denkinger received hateful letters and death threats from Cardinals fans following the game. The Royals went on to win the 1985 World Series.

== Background ==
In 1985, the St. Louis Cardinals met their cross-state rivals Kansas City Royals for the first time in a non-exhibition setting. They won 101 regular-season games and the league behind the MVP performance of center fielder Willie McGee (he led the league in batting (.353), triples (18) and hits (216)), and John Tudor's 21 wins and 10 shutouts. Rookie of the Year left fielder Vince Coleman dramatically increased the speed of an already larcenous team, pilfering a major-league leading 110 bases on the way to a new team record of 314.

The Cardinals won the National League East division by three games over the New York Mets and then defeated the Los Angeles Dodgers 4–2 in the National League Championship Series. The Royals went on an eight-game winning streak at the start of September to jump into first place in the American League West for the first time on September 6. They took first place for good when they took three of four games with the California Angels in Kansas City toward the end of the season to head to the post-season for the second year in a row. The Royals won the AL West by one game over the Angels and then defeated the Toronto Blue Jays 4–3 in the American League Championship Series. The Royals topped the West Division for the sixth time in ten years, led by Bret Saberhagen's Cy Young Award-winning performance and George Brett's self-described best "all around year."

=== Postseason ===
Throughout the ensuing playoffs, the Royals came back from 2–0 and 3–1 deficits, but managed to win each series. In Game 3, with Kansas City down 2 games to 0, George Brett homered twice and doubled off the fence in right field to put Kansas City back into the series. With the Royals down 3 games to 1 in the American League Championship Series against the Toronto Blue Jays, the Royals eventually rallied to win the series 4–3.

The Cardinals faced the Dodgers in the NL Championship Series (NLCS). They suffered a huge loss prior to the fourth game of the series when the automatic tarpaulin at Busch Stadium rolled over Coleman's leg during routine stretching exercises. The injury sidelined him for the rest of the postseason, but Todd Worrell pitched in four of the six games of the series, making scoreless appearances in Games 1, 3, and 5. Relieving Joaquín Andújar to begin the seventh inning of Game 6, with the score tied at four, Worrell threw a scoreless seventh inning, then gave up a home run to Mike Marshall to start the eighth. He retired the next three hitters he faced, then got the win after Jack Clark hit a three-run home run in the ninth, helping the Cardinals defeat the Dodgers 7–5 and win the series in six games.

When Cardinals and Royals officially met for the first time in the 1985 World Series, it marked only the second time in baseball history that two teams from the state of Missouri met in the World Series. The first time was in 1944, when the Cardinals played against the St. Louis Browns. The 1985 series was nicknamed the "I-70 Series" after the highway that connects the two in-state rivals.

Cardinals manager Whitey Herzog had been the Royals' manager from 1975 to 1979. He led Kansas City to the franchise's first three playoff appearances – in 1976, 1977, and 1978 – before getting fired just shortly after the Royals were eliminated from the playoffs in 1979.

In Game 1 of the World Series, Todd Worrell relieved John Tudor with two outs in the seventh and runners on first and third. After walking Lonnie Smith, Worrell got Willie Wilson to pop out to end the inning. In the eighth, he nearly gave up a home run to George Brett, but Andy Van Slyke caught the ball at the fence, and Worrell earned the save as the Cardinals won 3–1.

In Game 5, Worrell struck out all six batters he faced, but the Cardinals lost the game 6–1. However, he joined Hod Eller and Moe Drabowsky as the only pitchers to strike out six hitters in a row in World Series play.

== The setup ==
=== World Series Game 6 ===
Game 6 was a pitchers' duel between the Royals' Charlie Leibrandt and St. Louis' Danny Cox. Each held the opposing team scoreless through seven innings before the Cards finally broke through for a run in the eighth.

After seeing time in only 43 games with the Cardinals in 1985, Brian Harper would be released by the team following the season. Harper did, however, provide a memorable moment as a Cardinal in the 1985 World Series, appearing as a pinch-hitter in the aforementioned eighth inning and driving in Terry Pendleton with a single to give the Cardinals a 1–0 lead.

Todd Worrell then relieved Ken Dayley to start the ninth inning, with the Cardinals three outs away from clinching a World Series title. Jorge Orta was called upon to pinch hit for Pat Sheridan leading off the ninth inning with the Royals. The Cardinals had taken the field with a ninth-inning lead 97 times in the 1985 season. They had won 97 times.

=== The play ===
In the bottom of the ninth, Jorge Orta, the leadoff batter for the Royals, hit a slow ground ball to first baseman Jack Clark, who tossed the ball to the pitcher, Todd Worrell, who was covering first base. Denkinger called Orta safe, even though television replays and photographs clearly showed that he was out by half a step. The Royals went on to win Game 6 by the score of 2–1.

Following Orta's single, the Cardinals seemingly lost their concentration, with Jack Clark dropping an easy popout from Steve Balboni and Darrell Porter suffering a passed ball, before the Royals won with a bloop base hit by seldom used pinch hitter Dane Iorg, a former utility player for the Cardinals. The Royals trailed, 1–0, until Iorg's single allowed Onix Concepción and Jim Sundberg to score with one out and the bases loaded. The hit came during one of only two at-bats that Iorg received during the series.

Dan Quisenberry was the winning pitcher of Game 6.

== The calls ==
=== Al Michaels and Jim Palmer ===
Little squibber to the right side, Worrell races over to cover, the throw doesn't get him!

— ABC's Al Michaels calling Don Denkinger's infamous call in Game 6.

Looks like he's out.

— Jim Palmer during first replay shown

Oh, yes.

— Michaels as second replay is shown from another angle, this one from closer in

I don't think there's any doubt about it.

— Michaels during third replay shown

Except in one person's mind.

— Palmer

=== Jack Buck ===
Orta, leading off, swings and hits it to the right side, and the pitcher has to cover he is...SAFE, SAFE, SAFE, and we'll have an argument! Sparky, I think he was out!

— CBS Radio Sports announcer Jack Buck (alongside Sparky Anderson) calling Don Denkinger's blown call in Game 6.

He had the base and he had the ball, man, what else is there? That's the rule, isn't it?

— Jack Buck

== Aftermath ==
=== Commissioner Ueberroth tells Denkinger the truth ===
Following Game 6, Major League Baseball commissioner Peter Ueberroth met with Denkinger outside the umpire's locker room at Royals Stadium (Kaufman Stadium). Thinking that he had still made the right call, Denkinger asked Ueberroth if his call was correct, to which Ueberroth simply shook his head and told Denkinger that he had in fact blown the call.

=== Game 7 ===
As crew chief of the 1985 World Series umpiring unit, Denkinger was scheduled to work behind home plate in the decisive Game 7, a fact that further upset the Cardinals and manager Whitey Herzog. John Tudor was 3–1 with a 1.59 ERA that postseason, leading Herzog to go with Tudor in Game 7, despite the fact that Joaquín Andújar had five days' rest. The strategy failed, and Tudor was pulled in the third with the bases loaded and three runs already on the board. The score was 10–0 by the time Herzog brought Andújar in for mop-up duty.

Whitey Herzog's decision to send in Andújar—normally a starter—led to speculation that his decision was payback for Denkinger's infamous call in Game 6, but Herzog had stated that Andújar was the only Cardinal pitcher that still had any life left in his arm, as the Cardinals had gone through seven pitchers in the game.

The Royals won Game 7 by an 11–0 score for their first World Series title, with Denkinger ejecting both Herzog and Andújar in the fifth inning, following Andújar's animated displeasure with ball and strike calls. When Denkinger called a ball, Andújar emphatically showed his disagreement and had to be restrained by teammates. Herzog was furious and was ejected. A pitch later, Andújar was ejected for arguing another pitch which was clearly off the plate. Andújar charged Denkinger, bumping the umpire before being restrained by teammates.

Andújar was so furious after being ejected from Game 7 that he demolished a toilet and sink in the visitor's clubhouse bathroom in Royals Stadium with a bat. As a result of this and his conduct toward Denkinger, Andújar was fined $500—the maximum permissible amount at the time—and was suspended for the first 10 games of the following regular season. Andújar was additionally ordered to make restitution for damages.

The Royals became the first team ever to win the World Series after dropping Games 1 and 2 at home. Incidentally, after the Cardinals traded outfielder Lonnie Smith to the Royals on May 17, he stung them for a .333 batting average in the Series. Pitching two complete games, including a shutout in Game 7, Bret Saberhagen was named MVP of the World Series. He was also the subject of much media attention during the Series as his wife gave birth to his first son, Drew William, on the same night of the infamous Don Denkinger call.

The Royals did not return to the MLB postseason for 29 years, winning one of the American League wild cards in 2014 and advancing to the 2014 World Series. The following season, they claimed their first title since 1985 by winning the 2015 World Series.

=== Don Denkinger's life following The Call ===
In the immediate aftermath of the 1985 World Series, Denkinger received many hateful letters, including death threats, from Cardinals fans. Two St. Louis disc jockeys went so far as to reveal Denkinger's telephone number and home address. Denkinger claimed that the letters continued on through 1987, when the Cardinals were ramping up for another World Series appearance, this time against the Minnesota Twins. Denkinger got into contact with Major League Baseball Security, who in turn contacted the FBI, when he received a particularly menacing letter with no return address, in which the writer said that if he saw Denkinger in person, he would "blow him away" with a .357 Magnum.

More than 20 years after the 1985 series, Denkinger has regularly appeared at sports memorabilia shows (including ones in St. Louis) willing to autograph photos depicting "The Call." Denkinger even owns a painting featuring himself, Todd Worrell, and Jorge Orta involved in the play, claiming that he keeps it to remind himself that no one is perfect and everyone makes mistakes. In September 2005, Denkinger was a guest speaker at a 20th anniversary dinner celebrating the 1985 St. Louis Cardinals season, benefiting the Whitey Herzog Youth Foundation.

== In popular culture ==
Season 1 of the ESPN series The Top 5 Reasons You Can't Blame... featured an episode about the call.

== See also ==
- Cardinals–Royals rivalry
- List of nicknamed MLB games and plays
