= List of nicknamed Major League Baseball games and plays =

Major League Baseball games & plays with widely used nicknames

The following is a list of games that have been given names that are widely used or recalled in reference to the game or as part of a Major League Baseball (MLB) team's lore. This list does not include games named only after being a World Series game unless they are referred to by a name besides their official yearly name. The list also includes games with names given to them based on associated promotional events, such as Disco Demolition Night.

== List ==
=== Nicknamed games and series ===
Name	Date	Away team	Score	Home team	Notes
Addie Joss Benefit Game	July 24, 1911	All-Stars	5–3	Cleveland Naps	Exhibition benefit game for the family of recently deceased pitcher Addie Joss, preceding the creation of the Major League Baseball All-Star Game in 1933.
Mack Attack	October 12, 1929	Chicago Cubs	8–10	Philadelphia Athletics	Game 4 of the 1929 World Series: Famous for an Athletics rally from 8–0 that included a three-run inside-the-park home run, being the last inside-the-park home run in a World Series game until Game 1 of the 2015 World Series and helping to make the largest deficit overcome in postseason history.
Tri-Cornered Baseball Game	June 26, 1944	Brooklyn Dodgers, New York Yankees	5–1–0	New York Giants	Three-way exhibition baseball game as a fund-raiser for World War II, played in a round-robin format.
Grandstand Managers Night	August 24, 1951	Philadelphia Athletics	3–5	St. Louis Browns	Promotional game where fans collectively made managerial decisions for the team using double-sided placards reading "yes" and "no" for voting purposes.
Black Cat Game	September 9, 1969	Chicago Cubs	1–7	New York Mets	Game where a black cat ran onto the field at Shea Stadium, running behind Cubs' on-deck batter Ron Santo and across the visitor's dugout. The Cubs lost the game and eventually the division to the Mets. This game has been attributed to the Curse of the Billy Goat.
Ten Cent Beer Night	June 4, 1974	Texas Rangers	5–5 (forfeit)	Cleveland Indians	Infamous promotion held by the Cleveland Indians selling beer for ten cents, culminating in a violent riot of fans that forced the chief umpire to forfeit the game to Texas.
Black Friday	October 7, 1977	Los Angeles Dodgers	6–5	Philadelphia Phillies	Game 3 of the 1977 National League Championship Series: Dubbed as such by Philadelphia due to the Dodgers winning the game when trailing going into the ninth inning.
Bucky Dent Game	October 2, 1978	New York Yankees	5–4	Boston Red Sox	1978 American League East tie-breaker game: Named after light-hitter Bucky Dent's three-run home run to give the Yankees a 3–2 lead and ultimately win the game.
Disco Demolition Night	July 12, 1979	Detroit Tigers	4–1	Chicago White Sox	Promotional game that gave discounts to those who brought a disco record, resulting in all the collected vinyls being blown up in the middle of the field, provoking a riot and causing significant damage to the field, thus forcing Chicago to forfeit the next game to Detroit.
Blue Monday	October 19, 1981	Los Angeles Dodgers	2–1	Montreal Expos	With two outs in the top of the ninth inning of the deciding game of the 1981 National League Championship Series, Dodgers right fielder Rick Monday hit a home run off Expos ace Steve Rogers to break a 1–1 tie. The Expos got two runners on in the bottom of the ninth but did not score, and the Dodgers advanced to (and eventually won) the World Series. This was the last postseason game the Expos would play before moving to Washington after the 2004 season.
Pine Tar Game	July 24, 1983	Kansas City Royals	5–4	New York Yankees	Game featuring a controversial umpire ruling stating that Royals batter George Brett had exceeded the amount of pine tar allowed on his bat, negating a two-run home run with an out that required the game to be restarted from the point of the home run.
Sandberg Game	June 23, 1984	St. Louis Cardinals	11–12	Chicago Cubs	Game where Ryne Sandberg hit two home runs in the ninth and tenth innings to bring the Cubs victory despite holding deficits of 7–1, 9–3, and 11–9.
Bean Brawl Game	August 12, 1984	San Diego Padres	3–5	Atlanta Braves	Series of brawls caused by several attempted beanings and retaliations, resulting in 13 ejections, five arrests, and fan involvement.
Rick Camp Game	July 4, 1985	New York Mets	16–13	Atlanta Braves	Game known for Braves relief pitcher Rick Camp, a career .060 hitter at the time with no home runs, hitting a solo home run in the 18th inning to re-tie the game.
Earthquake Series	October 17, 1989	Oakland Athletics	N/A	San Francisco Giants	1989 Loma Prieta earthquake struck just prior to Game 3 of the 1989 World Series, being the first major earthquake in the United States to be broadcast by live television.
The Final March	October 24, 1996	New York Yankees	1–0	Atlanta Braves	Game 5 of the 1996 World Series, which marked the final baseball game at Atlanta Fulton County Stadium. Andy Pettite and John Wetteland combined for a shutout of the Braves. Paul O'Neill's robbery of a potential extra-base hit by Luis Polonia in the 9th inning gave Wetteland the save and eventually the World Series Most Valuable Player Award.
The Bloody Sock Game	October 19, 2004	Boston Red Sox	4–2	New York Yankees	Game 6 of the 2004 American League Championship Series, known for Curt Schilling's pitching performance despite a torn tendon sheath in his right ankle which led to a visible blood stain on his sock.
The Bug Game	October 5, 2007	New York Yankees	1–2	Cleveland Indians	Game 2 of the 2007 American League Division Series, New York–Cleveland matchup, where a swarm of tiny insects circled the mound in the late innings, causing the game to stop momentarily.
Blackout Game	September 30, 2008	Minnesota Twins	0–1	Chicago White Sox	2008 American League Central tie-breaker game, known for being the lowest-scoring game in MLB tie-breaker history and for fans wearing all-black clothing to show support for the White Sox.
The Imperfect Game	June 2, 2010	Cleveland Indians	0–3	Detroit Tigers	A near-perfect game played by Detroit pitcher Armando Galarraga that was ruined one out short after first-base umpire Jim Joyce incorrectly ruled that Indians batter Jason Donald reached first base safely on a ground ball.
Game 162	September 28, 2011	St. Louis Cardinals	8–0	Houston Astros	Collective night with four games played across both leagues, all with wild card implications. Considered one of the greatest endings to a regular season in baseball history.
Game 162	September 28, 2011	Philadelphia Phillies	4–3	Atlanta Braves	Collective night with four games played across both leagues, all with wild card implications. Considered one of the greatest endings to a regular season in baseball history.
Game 162	September 28, 2011	Boston Red Sox	3–4	Baltimore Orioles	Collective night with four games played across both leagues, all with wild card implications. Considered one of the greatest endings to a regular season in baseball history.
Game 162	September 28, 2011	New York Yankees	7–8	Tampa Bay Rays	Collective night with four games played across both leagues, all with wild card implications. Considered one of the greatest endings to a regular season in baseball history.
Infield Fly Game	October 5, 2012	St. Louis Cardinals	6–3	Atlanta Braves	2012 National League Wild Card Game, known for a controversial infield fly called by umpire Sam Holbrook on a fly ball off the bat of Braves player Andrelton Simmons that landed in shallow left field between Cardinals players Pete Kozma and Matt Holliday.
Crowdless Game	April 29, 2015	Chicago White Sox	2–8	Baltimore Orioles	The first crowdless game ever played by Major League Baseball teams as a result of civil unrest in Baltimore following the death of Freddie Gray.
Fort Bragg Game	July 3, 2016	Miami Marlins	5–2	Atlanta Braves	Specialty game played at Fort Bragg Stadium in Fort Bragg, North Carolina, the first regular season professional sports event ever held on an active military base and first MLB game played in North Carolina.
Bedlam at the Bank	October 23, 2022	San Diego Padres	3–4	Philadelphia Phillies	Game 5 of the 2022 National League Championship Series, where Philadelphia player Bryce Harper hit a two-run home run to left field, giving the Phillies a one-run lead and causing a "delirious reaction" from the home fans.
Reverse Boycott Game	June 13, 2023	Tampa Bay Rays	1–2	Oakland Athletics	Game where Oakland Athletics fans protested the team's relocation to Las Vegas by getting as many fans to attend the game as possible in order to demonstrate that there was still a sizable market for Major League Baseball in Oakland.
Loss No. 121 / Loss #121	September 28, 2024	Chicago White Sox	1–4	Detroit Tigers	Notable for being the 2024 White Sox's 121st loss of the season, beating the record for the most losses by any team in an MLB season post-1900. The game was also notable for Detroit's win clinching their first playoff berth since 2014.
The Ohtani Game	October 17, 2025	Milwaukee Brewers	1–5	Los Angeles Dodgers	Game 4 of the 2025 National League Championship Series, where Shohei Ohtani hit 3 home runs and pitched 6 scoreless innings with 10 strikeouts to clinch the National League Pennant. Considered to be the greatest postseason baseball performance ever.

=== Nicknamed plays and in-game events ===
Name	Date	Away team	Score	Home team	Notes
$15‚000 slide	October 23, 1886	Chicago White Stockings	3–4	St. Louis Browns	Play during the 1886 World Series where St. Louis player Curt Welch scored on a slide after a wild pitch to win the series.
Merkle's Boner	September 23, 1908	Chicago Cubs	1–1	New York Giants	Base-running error made by New York rookie Fred Merkle by failing to advance to second base on what should have been a game-winning hit, leading to a tied game with Chicago winning the replayed game that allowed them to take the 1908 National League (NL) pennant.
Snodgrass's Muff	October 16, 1912	New York Giants	2–3	Boston Red Sox	A significant fly ball drop in the 1912 World Series made by New York center fielder Fred Snodgrass, becoming crucial to their loss to the Red Sox.
Babe Ruth's called shot	October 1, 1932	New York Yankees	7–5	Chicago Cubs	Home run hit by Yankees batter Babe Ruth in Game 3 of the 1932 World Series, preceded by him making a pointing gesture widely interpreted as him calling the direction he would send the ball.
Homer in the Gloamin'	September 28, 1938	Pittsburgh Pirates	5–6	Chicago Cubs	Home run hit by Chicago future Hall of Famer Gabby Hartnett in darkness, due to the late hour of the ninth inning with no artificial light present, leading to the Cubs' victory and allowing them to reach the 1938 World Series.
Lombardi's Big Snooze	October 8, 1939	New York Yankees	7–4	Cincinnati Reds	Play in the last inning of the last game of the 1939 World Series, where Cincinnati catcher Ernie Lombardi was accidentally hit in the groin, dazing him and allowing Joe DiMaggio to score.
Slaughter's Mad Dash	October 13, 1946	Boston Red Sox	3–4	St. Louis Cardinals	Play in the 7th game of the 1946 World Series where St. Louis right fielder Enos Slaughter allegedly ran through third base coach Mike González's stop sign and ran for home, while Boston shortstop Johnny Pesky continued to hold the ball instead of throwing to home, costing the Red Sox the deciding game of the World Series.
Shot Heard 'Round the World	October 3, 1951	Brooklyn Dodgers	4–5	New York Giants	Walk-off home run hit by New York third baseman Bobby Thomson in the ninth inning of a three-game playoff for the pennant, scoring three runs and putting New York ahead by a score. The play was seen by millions of viewers across America and heard on radio by millions more.
The Catch	September 29, 1954	Cleveland Indians	2–5	New York Giants	Play made during Game 1 of the 1954 World Series where New York player Willie Mays caught Vic Wertz's deep fly ball, preventing a score and helping the New York Giants win the World Series.
Battle of Candlestick	August 22, 1965	Los Angeles Dodgers	3–4	San Francisco Giants	14-minute long bench-clearing brawl considered to be one of the most violent in sports history.
Shoe Polish Play	October 16, 1969	Baltimore Orioles	3–5	New York Mets	Play during Game 5 of the 1969 World Series, where a pitched ball hit New York batter Cleon Jones on the foot. The Orioles claimed the ball hit the dirt and not Jones, but when inspected, a spot of shoe polish was found on the ball, resulting in Jones being awarded first base.
Carlton Fisk waves it fair	October 21, 1975	Cincinnati Reds	6–7	Boston Red Sox	Home run hit by Boston player Carlton Fisk in Game 6 of the 1975 World Series, during which Fisk gestured to try and wave the struck ball away from the left field line in hopes that it would not end up as a foul ball.
Gatorade Glove Play	October 7, 1984	Chicago Cubs	3–6	San Diego Padres	Error in catching a ground ball made by Leon Durham in the decisive fifth game of the 1984 National League Championship Series, prior to which Gatorade had been spilled on Durham's glove.
The Call	October 26, 1985	St. Louis Cardinals	1–2	Kansas City Royals	Bad call made by umpire Don Denkinger in Game 6 of the 1985 World Series, contributing to the St. Louis Cardinals' loss of the World Series and leading to several death threats and hate mail being sent to Denkinger.
Buckner Play	October 25, 1986	Boston Red Sox	5–6	New York Mets	Tenth-inning error in Game 6 of the 1986 World Series where Boston player Bill Buckner failed to catch a ground ball in between his legs, culminating in the Red Sox's loss of the game and eventually the World Series and leading to several death threats, derisive comments, and pop culture references to Buckner.
Kirk Gibson's home run	October 15, 1988	Oakland Athletics	4–5	Los Angeles Dodgers	Pinch hit walk-off home run hit by Los Angeles outfielder Kirk Gibson in the ninth inning of Game 1 of the 1988 World Series, despite injuries to both of Gibson's legs.
The Slide	October 14, 1992	Pittsburgh Pirates	2–3	Atlanta Braves	Game-winning play in Game 7 of the 1992 National League Championship Series where Braves player Sid Bream was able to slide just underneath Pittsburgh catcher Mike LaValliere's tag to score the winning run.
The Double	October 8, 1995	New York Yankees	5–6	Seattle Mariners	Double hit by the Seattle Mariners' Edgar Martínez in Game 5 of Major League Baseball's 1995 American League Division Series that scored two runs to clinch the series. Generally considered to be the "biggest hit in franchise history" for helping prevent the team from moving out of Seattle and garner approval for a new stadium.
Jeffrey Maier incident	October 9, 1996	Baltimore Orioles	4–5	New York Yankees	Incident during Game 1 of the 1996 American League Championship Series where 12-year-old spectator Jeffrey Maier deflected a batted ball by New York Yankee Derek Jeter into the Yankee Stadium stands to be ruled a home run rather than fan interference, allowing the Yankees to tie the game and eventually win the series.
The Graze	October 26, 1997	Cleveland Indians	2–3	Florida Marlins	Series-ending play in Game 7 of the 1997 World Series in which Charles Nagy failed to reach a ball hit over his head, resulting in a walk-off single for Edgar Renteria and a world championship for the Marlins. This was also the final play to be called by Indians broadcaster Herb Score, while his Marlins counterpart, Joe Angel, announced that a "five-year old child has become king!"
Grand Slam Single	October 17, 1999	Atlanta Braves	3–4	New York Mets	Game-winning play in Game 5 of the 1999 National League Championship Series where Mets player Robin Ventura hit what was effectively a grand slam that was credited as a single due to him never running across all the bases due to the on-field celebration.
The Flip	October 13, 2001	New York Yankees	1–0	Oakland Athletics	Play made in Game 3 of the 2001 American League Division Series where Yankees shortstop Derek Jeter, intercepting outfielder Shane Spencer's overthrown cut-off throw, flipped the ball to catcher Jorge Posada, who tagged out Athletics designated hitter Jeremy Giambi.
Mr. November	November 1, 2001	Arizona Diamondbacks	3–4	New York Yankees	Walk-off home run hit in Game 4 of the 2001 World Series by Yankees shortstop Derek Jeter; the game started on October 31 and extended into November for the first time in MLB history following the season being pushed back after the September 11 attacks. Jeter earned the tongue-in-cheek nickname of "Mr. November" by Yankees radio announcer Michael Kay.
Steve Bartman incident	October 14, 2003	Florida Marlins	8–3	Chicago Cubs	Controversial play during Game 6 of the 2003 National League Championship Series, where a Marlins-hit ball that was attempted to be caught by Cubs player Moisés Alou was inadvertently deflected away by Cubs fan Steve Bartman, after which the Marlins scored eight runs and won. Bartman was subsequently doxed and harassed by enraged Cubs fans.
Bautista bat flip	October 14, 2015	Texas Rangers	3–6	Toronto Blue Jays	Described as "the most ostentatious bat flip in MLB history" following a go-ahead, three-run home run by Toronto outfielder José Bautista during Game 5 of the 2015 American League Division Series, resulting in criticism against Bautista, memes made of the incident, and a later confrontation against the Texas Rangers culminating in Bautista being punched in the face by Rougned Odor (though the last one was also partly because Bautista had violated a new rule resulting from a different incident in a 2015 National League Division Series matchup).
A drive into deep left field by Castellanos	August 19, 2020	Cincinnati Reds	5–0	Kansas City Royals	Play made by Cincinnati player Nick Castellanos made famous for occurring in the middle of an on-air apology from play-by-play announcer Thom Brennaman after he said an anti-gay slur on a hot mic during the pre-game, resulting in Brennaman interrupting his apology to call the play as a drive into deep left field by Castellanos which was a home run, to make it a 4–0 ballgame, before resuming the apology. Subsequently, many sports fans and publications began to document home runs made by Castellanos at similarly inopportune or awkward times.
The Grandest of all Slams	October 25, 2024	New York Yankees	3–6	Los Angeles Dodgers	A walk-off grand slam made by Dodgers first baseman Freddie Freeman in the bottom of the 10th inning of Game 1 of the 2024 World Series, the first in World Series history. Freeman's achievement received comparisons to Kirk Gibson's homer in similar circumstances in 1988. The Dodgers would later win the World Series in five games, with Freeman being credited as World Series MVP.

== See also ==
- History of baseball in the United States
- List of baseball nicknames
- List of nicknamed college football games and plays
- List of nicknamed NFL games and plays
