= Jorge Orta =

Mexican baseball player (born 1950)

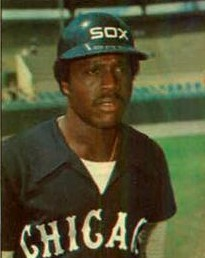
- Second baseman / Outfielder
- Born: November 26, 1950 (age 75); Mazatlán, Sinaloa, Mexico
- Batted: Left Threw: Right

MLB debut
- April 15, 1972, for the Chicago White Sox

Last MLB appearance
- June 10, 1987, for the Kansas City Royals

MLB statistics
- Batting average: .278
- Home runs: 130
- Runs batted in: 745
- Stats at Baseball Reference

Teams
- Chicago White Sox (1972–1979); Cleveland Indians (1980–1981); Los Angeles Dodgers (1982); Toronto Blue Jays (1983); Kansas City Royals (1984–1987)

Career highlights and awards
- 2× All-Star (1975, 1980); World Series champion (1985)

Member of the Mexican Professional

Baseball Hall of Fame
- Induction: 1996

Jorge Orta Núñez (born November 26, 1950) is a Mexican former professional baseball second baseman and outfielder. He played fifteen seasons in Major League Baseball (MLB) from 1972 to 1987 for the Chicago White Sox, Cleveland Indians, Los Angeles Dodgers, Toronto Blue Jays, and Kansas City Royals. He is best remembered for being at the center of one of the most controversial plays in World Series history.

== Chicago White Sox ==
Orta signed with the Chicago White Sox out of the Mexican Baseball League, and made the team out of spring training 1972 at shortstop without first playing in the minor leagues. He batted just .211 through the middle of May, losing his starting job to Rich Morales. He spent two months as a utility infielder before being optioned to the Southern League's Knoxville Sox in mid-July after compiling a .191 batting average, one home run and seven runs batted in. After batting .316 with seven home runs at Knoxville, he returned to Chicago when rosters expanded that September. His second major league home run was an extra innings game winner on September 19 against Gary Waslewski and the Oakland A's.

Orta was shifted to second base for the 1973 season after batting over .500 in spring training. Playing through injuries for much of the year, he batted .266 and tied for second in the American League (AL) with eighteen errors among second basemen.

Orta began the 1974 season batting at the bottom of the White Sox line-up, but was moved up to the number two spot in manager Chuck Tanner's batting order, and batted .411 with 23 runs scored in the month of June. More specifically, he batted .516 with four home runs from June 17 to June 23 to earn AL Player of the Week honors. For the season, his .316 batting average was second only to Rod Carew in the AL.

For the 1975 season, Orta batted .296 with four home runs and 46 RBIs in the first half to be named to the AL All-Star team, but did not appear in the game due to a pulled hamstring in his right leg. He returned healthy on July 17, and batted .314 with seven home runs and 37 RBIs in the second half.

Prior to the start of the 1976 season, the White Sox acquired Jack Brohamer from the Cleveland Indians. New Chicago manager Paul Richards opted to use Brohamer at second and Orta at third. Orta proved himself a poor third baseman, and was eventually moved into the outfield while rookie Kevin Bell took over at third. The Sox lost 97 games in 1976. For his part, Orta batted .274, while hitting a career-high fourteen home runs and scoring a career high 74 runs.

Orta returned to second base when Bob Lemon replaced Richards as manager in 1977. The White Sox won 90 games to finish third in the American League West. Orta, now batting third in the line-up, finished second on the team (to Richie Zisk) with a career high 84 RBIs. He remained at second in 1978, but new player-manager Don Kessinger deployed Orta as the designated hitter in 1979, and Orta struggled in the role, accruing a .212 batting average, three home runs and 21 RBIs through June 27. Meanwhile, second base had become something of a revolving door, with Kessinger, Alan Bannister, Joe Gates, Jim Morrison and Greg Pryor all manning the position at one point or another. Orta returned to second base in the middle of July, and batted .313 with seven home runs and 22 RBIs the rest of the way.

== Cleveland Indians ==
Following the 1979 season, Orta signed a five-year deal with the Cleveland Indians. With the Indians, Orta became a full-time right fielder, and soon emerged as one of the better fielding right fielders in the league. He maintained a .987 fielding percentage in his two seasons in Cleveland, and his eleven assists in 1981 tied for second among A.L. outfielders.

On June 15, 1980, he tied an A.L. record for the most hits in one game with six. The feat raised his season average to .339, and likely played a part in his being named Cleveland's sole representative at the 1980 Major League Baseball All-Star Game. He did not, however, appear in the game.

With prospect Von Hayes ready to assume an everyday major league job in right field, Orta became trade-bait at the 1981 Winter meetings. On December 9, he and two minor leaguers (Jack Fimple and Larry White) were sent to the Los Angeles Dodgers for Jack Perconte and former Rookie of the Year winning pitcher Rick Sutcliffe.

== Los Angeles Dodgers ==
With the Dodgers, Orta found himself in a reserve role for the first time in his career. As a pinch hitter, Orta batted just .150 with one home run and five RBIs. He would occasionally spell Pedro Guerrero a day off in right field, and batted .291 in that role. After his only season in Los Angeles, he was traded to the New York Mets for pitcher Pat Zachry.

== Toronto Blue Jays ==
Shortly after acquiring Orta, the Mets traded him to the Toronto Blue Jays for pitcher Steve Senteney. Orta was used primarily at DH by the Jays, though he did occasionally sub for Jesse Barfield in right. After the 1983 season, he was traded to the Kansas City Royals for Willie Aikens.

== Kansas City Royals ==
Orta made 438 plate appearances in 1984, his most since 1980. He and Hal McRae formed a very successful lefty/righty platoon at DH with the Royals, as the Royals got a .305 batting average, ten home runs and 81 RBIs out of their DH position for the season. Orta also played some outfield, batting .310 with three home runs and fifteen RBIs in that role. His ninth inning sacrifice fly on September 12 defeated the Minnesota Twins to move the Royals into a first place tie in the A.L. West. The race came down to the wire between the Royals, Twins and California Angels with the Royals eventually winning the division by three games over each team. Orta may have been on the receiving end of some gamesmanship on September 20 when Angels catcher Bob Boone accused Orta of using a corked bat after his first at-bat of the game. His bat was confiscated by umpire Jim McKean, and the accusation turned out to be fruitless. Orta led off the fifth with a single with a different bat.

Orta's first trip to the post-season did not go as well as he may have hoped. The Royals were swept by the Detroit Tigers in the 1984 American League Championship Series. Orta went one-for-ten with a triple and an RBI.

The Royals stuck with the platoon of McRae and Orta at DH in 1985. Though the DH position's batting average dropped to .256, they hit nineteen home runs while driving in 114 runs. The 1985 season once again came down to the wire between the Royals and Angels. The Royals went on an eight-game winning streak at the start of September to jump into first place in the A.L. West for the first time on September 6. They took first place for good when they took three of four games with the Angels in Kansas City toward the end of the season to head to the post-season for the second year in a row.

=== 1985 World Series ===
Orta was held hitless in five at-bats in the 1985 American League Championship Series against the Toronto Blue Jays. At-bats were hard to come by in the World Series against the St. Louis Cardinals, as it was played under National League rules without the DH in 1985. Orta appeared in games one and two as a pinch hitter, flying out to center each time. The Royals lost both of the first two games held in Kansas City, but surprisingly, took two out of three in St. Louis to return home in a two games to three hole.

Game six was a pitchers' duel between the Royals' Charlie Leibrandt and St. Louis' Danny Cox. Each held the opposing team scoreless through seven innings before the Cards finally broke through for a run in the eighth. Orta was called upon to pinch hit for Pat Sheridan leading off the ninth inning with the Royals down 1–0. He hit a slow roller Cardinal first baseman Jack Clark fielded, and flipped to pitcher Todd Worrell covering first. First base umpire Don Denkinger called Orta safe, but television replays showed that Worrell beat him to the bag.

The following batter, Steve Balboni, hit a pop foul that ended up falling between Clark and catcher Darrell Porter. Given new life, Balboni hit a single to left on the very next pitch, moving Orta to second base. With Onix Concepción pinch running for Balboni, Jim Sundberg followed with an unsuccessful sacrifice bunt in which Orta was thrown out at third. The next batter was Hal McRae, pinch hitting for Buddy Biancalana. After Porter allowed a passed ball that allowed both runners to move up a base, McRae was intentionally walked to load the bases. Dane Iorg, pinch hitting for Dan Quisenberry, singled to right field driving in two runs, and giving Kansas City a 2–1 win. The only out recorded by the Cardinals in the inning was Orta at third.

The win shifted momentum of the Series to the Royals, who won the Series the next night on Bret Saberhagen's 11–0 shutout. Years of debate between Cardinals' and Royals' fans have followed over what might have happened if Orta had been put out at first instead of third.

== Retirement ==
Orta shared DH duties with Hal McRae in 1986 as well. In 1987, with rookie Kevin Seitzer ready to assume a starting job at third base, Hall of Famer George Brett was shifted to first base, and Balboni became the Royals' DH. Orta was released June 17, followed by McRae on July 21.

== Career statistics ==
In 1,755 games over 16 seasons, Orta posted a .278 batting average (1,619-for-5,829) with 733 runs, 267 doubles, 63 triples, 130 home runs, 745 RBI, 79 stolen bases, 500 bases on balls, .334 on-base percentage and .412 slugging percentage. He finished his career with a .973 fielding percentage. In 8 postseason games, he hit only .111 (2-for-18) with 1 run, 1 triple and 1 RBI.

== Personal life ==
Orta was born in Mazatlán from Afro-Cuban parents. His father was Pedro Orta, former baseball player who played in the Cuban League and Mexican League in the late 40s and early 50s.

== See also ==
- Afro-Mexicans
- List of Major League Baseball single-game hits leaders
