= Francisco Cabrera (baseball) =

Dominican baseball player (born 1966)

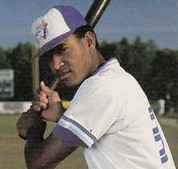
- Cabrera in 1988
- First baseman / Catcher
- Born: October 10, 1966 (age 60); Santo Domingo, Dominican Republic
- Batted: Right Threw: Right

MLB debut
- July 24, 1989, for the Toronto Blue Jays

Last MLB appearance
- September 24, 1993, for the Atlanta Braves

MLB statistics
- Batting average: .254
- Home runs: 17
- Runs batted in: 62

NPB statistics
- Batting average: .237
- Home runs: 11
- Runs batted in: 46

CPBL statistics
- Batting average: .331
- Home runs: 4
- Runs batted in: 40
- Stats at Baseball Reference

Teams
- Toronto Blue Jays (1989); Atlanta Braves (1989–1993); Orix BlueWave (1994); China Times Eagles (1997)

Francisco Cabrera Hernandez (born October 10, 1966) is a Dominican former Major League Baseball catcher/first baseman who played five seasons with the Toronto Blue Jays and the Atlanta Braves from 1989 to 1993. He also played in Japan with the Orix BlueWave in 1994 and the now defunct China Times Eagles of the CPBL in 1997. He is best known for his game-winning pinch hit for the Braves in 1992 that sent them to that year's World Series.

== Playing career ==
Cabrera signed with the Toronto Blue Jays in 1985 and made his major league debut for them in 1989. He played in only three games with the Blue Jays before being traded to the Braves for Jim Acker in the middle of the 1989 season. Cabrera was a reserve for most of his career and had his best season in 1990 in which he played sixty-three games and had 137 at-bats, getting 38 hits, with seven home runs. He appeared in nine postseason games, pinch hitting in seven of them, and got three hits in those seven at-bats.

=== Career highlights ===
==== August 21, 1991 ====
Cabrera is credited with hitting the home run that marked the turning point in the history of the Atlanta Braves. On Wednesday, August 21, 1991, the Braves played the Reds and entered the ninth inning trailing, 9–6. Reds ace reliever Rob Dibble was on the mound with two outs. Cabrera had started the game to give Braves starter Greg Olson a much-needed rest. With two outs, David Justice doubled, and Brian Hunter walked to bring Cabrera to the plate with the tying run. He responded with a three-run homer off Dibble to tie the game, which the Braves eventually won in 13 innings. The game kept them 2 1/2 games behind the Dodgers in a race they eventually won by one game. The Braves went 29–12 after Cabrera's home run and eventually reached the World Series for the first time in their 26 seasons in Atlanta, before losing to the Twins in seven games.

==== 1992 National League Championship Series ====
Cabrera is best known for his game-winning pinch hit in the ninth inning of the seventh and deciding game of the 1992 National League Championship Series that put the Braves into the World Series. With Atlanta trailing the Pittsburgh Pirates 2–1 with two outs and the bases loaded, the Braves called on Cabrera to pinch hit despite him having only twelve plate appearances across the entire regular season and postseason. Facing Pirates closer Stan Belinda, Cabrera hit a line drive over shortstop Jay Bell on a 2–1 pitch to left field that scored David Justice and Sid Bream, who barely beat a throw from left fielder Barry Bonds to win the pennant for the Braves. The Braves would lose the World Series in six games to Cabrera's former team, the Toronto Blue Jays.

==== 1993 National League Championship Series ====
Cabrera pinch hit three times in the 1993 NLCS against the Philadelphia Phillies, recording two hits. In the bottom of the ninth inning of Game Five, with the series tied at two and the Braves down by a run, Cabrera hit a single up the middle, scoring Fred McGriff from second base to tie the game and force extra innings. The Phillies eventually won the game in ten innings and won the next game to take the series; the hit would be Cabrera's final at bat in his Major League career, as the Braves released him that offseason.
