= Jeffrey Maier incident =

Baseball incident in 1996

The Jeffrey Maier incident occurred during Game 1 of the 1996 American League Championship Series between the New York Yankees and the Baltimore Orioles. Twelve-year-old Jeffrey Maier deflected a batted ball, hit by Yankee Derek Jeter, into the Yankee Stadium stands for what umpires ruled to be a home run, rather than fan interference. His interference altered the course of Game 1. The resulting home run allowed the Yankees to tie the score. They were victorious in the game and won the series four games to one. "Maier became an immediate celebrity in New York, a pariah in Baltimore and an everlasting character in baseball lore."

== Incident ==
On October 9, 1996, the Yankees trailed the Orioles 4–3 in the bottom of the eighth inning when shortstop Derek Jeter hit a deep fly ball to right field. Right fielder Tony Tarasco moved near the fence and appeared "to draw a bead on the ball" when the then-12-year-old Maier clearly reached over the fence separating the stands and the field of play nine feet below and attempted to catch the ball with his glove. Maier failed to make the catch but he knocked the ball over the fence in his attempt. While baseball fans are permitted to catch (and keep) balls hit into the stands, the Major League Baseball rulebook states that spectator interference is to be called if "a spectator reaches out of the stands, or goes on the playing field, and touches a live ball".

Right field umpire Rich Garcia immediately ruled the play a home run, tying the game at 4–4, despite the protest of Tarasco and Orioles manager Davey Johnson (the latter was ejected in the ensuing argument).

In right-field, Tarasco...going back to the track...to the wall...and what happens here!? He contends that a fan reaches up and touches it! But Richie Garcia says no...it's a home run!

— Bob Costas on the call on NBC.

The Yankees won the game in the eleventh inning on Bernie Williams' walk-off home run. The Orioles maintained their protest of the Maier play after the conclusion of the game, but their protest was denied by American League President Gene Budig because judgment calls cannot be protested. After viewing the replay, Garcia admitted he made a mistake and that there was spectator interference, but maintained Maier reached out, not down, and did not interfere with Tarasco's ability to catch the ball and that Tarasco would not have caught it. Tarasco adamantly disagreed, maintaining he would have caught the ball without Maier's interference. Had Garcia called spectator interference, he would have then used his own judgment to determine what the most likely outcome of the play would be – either an out or awarding Jeter a given number of bases.

Garcia accepted Orioles fans later booing him, but was disturbed when Yankees fans cheered him, as he did not want to appear biased. Two days after the incident Garcia said no one felt worse about it than he did, but that one play after 22 years of hard work as an umpire should not make him hang his head, adding, "I love Baltimore, I love the team and I love this stadium [Camden Yards]...."

The Yankees went on to win the series against the Orioles, four games to one, as well as the World Series against the Atlanta Braves. As a result of the play, a railing was added behind the right field wall at Yankee Stadium to prevent fans from reaching over it.

Meanwhile, in New York, Maier became a minor celebrity. The New York Times described him as having become "New York royalty". The New York Daily News allowed him to sit behind the Yankee dugout during the World Series. The boy appeared on national talk shows. On the other end, a 2012 article in the Baltimore Sun began, "The most despised child in the history of Baltimore sports is all grown up." Then Yankees' manager Joe Torre said after the incident, "I think it's glorifying the wrong thing." Maier himself has come to terms more over the years with the impact of the incident as he has grown older, married, and become a father. He has stated, "'It's a huge part of baseball history, either positive or negative depending on your allegiance, but it's part of history nonetheless.'"

30 years later, in the 2026 American League Division Series, down 0-2 against AL East rival Tampa Bay Rays, Anthony Volpe appeared to hit what would have been a game tying two run home run in the bottom of the 6th. Instead, it was ruled that fan interference took place, ironically involving an unnamed Yankee fan. The ball was deemed uncatchable and turned into an RBI ground rule double. The Yankees were unable to tie the game and went on to be swept by the Rays.

== See also ==
- Steve Bartman incident – a similar fan incident during a 2003 Major League Baseball postseason game, with the difference being that the fan cost his own team an out and became ostracised by the Chicago public.
- List of nicknamed MLB games and plays
