= Tony Tarasco =

American baseball player (born 1970)

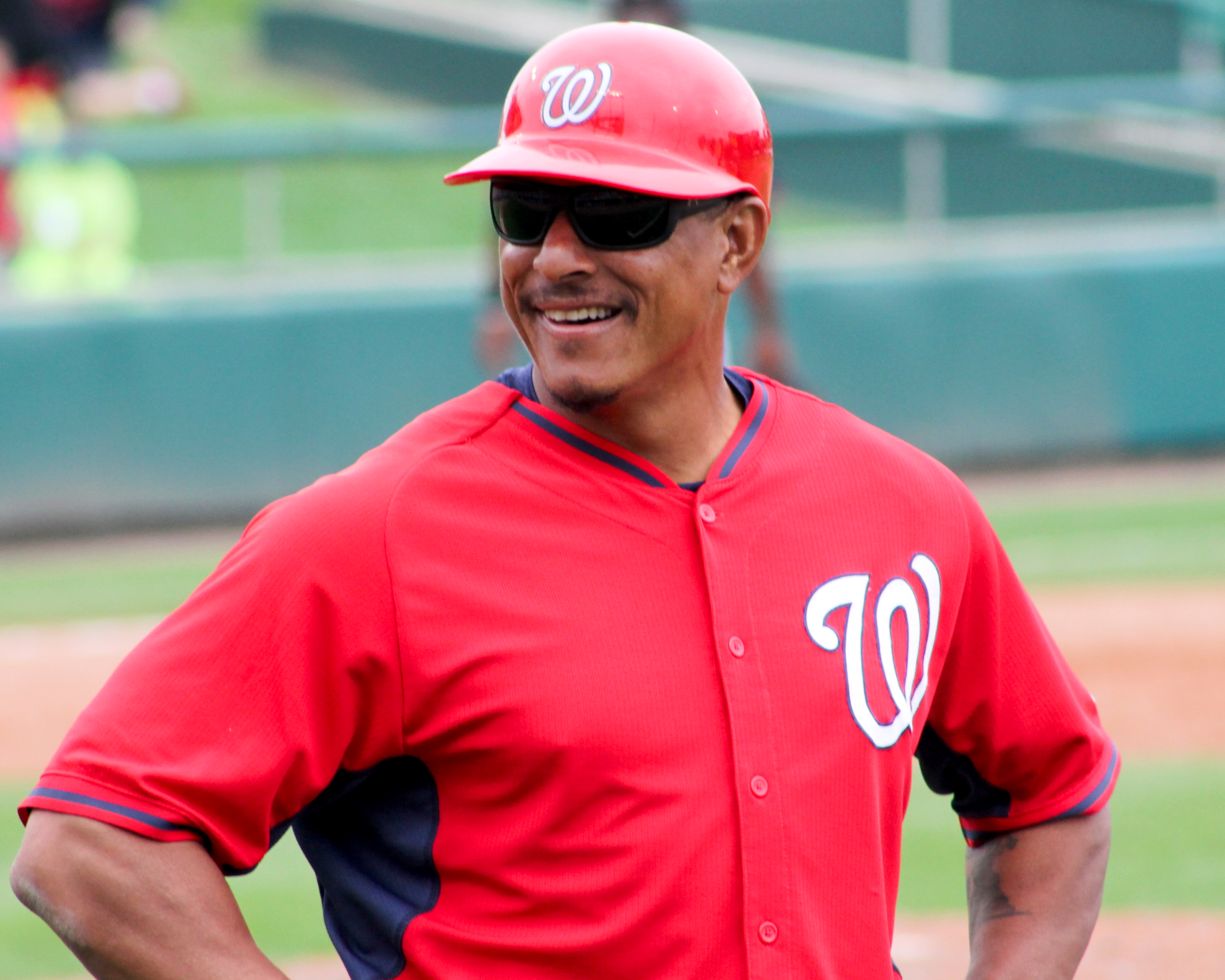
- Tarasco at spring training in March 2015
- Outfielder / Coach
- Born: December 9, 1970 (age 55); New York City, U.S.
- Batted: Left Threw: Right

Professional debut
- MLB: April 30, 1993, for the Atlanta Braves
- NPB: March 31, 2000, for the Hanshin Tigers

Last appearance
- MLB: September 1, 2002, for the New York Mets
- NPB: October 6, 2000, for the Hanshin Tigers

MLB statistics
- Batting average: .240
- Home runs: 34
- Runs batted in: 118

NPB statistics
- Batting average: .239
- Home runs: 19
- Runs batted in: 57
- Stats at Baseball Reference

Teams
- As player: Atlanta Braves (1993–1994); Montreal Expos (1995); Baltimore Orioles (1996–1997); Cincinnati Reds (1998); New York Yankees (1999); Hanshin Tigers (2000); New York Mets (2002); As coach: Washington Nationals (2013–2015); New York Mets (2021)

Anthony Giacinto Tarasco (born December 9, 1970) is an American professional baseball outfielder and coach. He played in the major leagues for the Atlanta Braves, Montreal Expos, Baltimore Orioles, Cincinnati Reds, and New York Yankees between 1993 and 1999 and for the Mets in 2002. He also played with the Hanshin Tigers in the Japanese Central League in 2000.

== Early life ==
Tarasco was born at Saint Vincent's Catholic Medical Center in Greenwich Village to an Italian American father and Trinidadian American mother. Until age nine, he lived in Washington Heights, the Bronx, and Brooklyn. His father, Jack, worked a summer job as a vendor at Yankee Stadium. At 13 years old, after moving to Santa Monica, California, Tarasco joined the Santa Monica Graveyard Crips, a set of the Crips street gang. At 16 years old, with the encouragement of fellow Crips members, he left the gang to focus on playing high school baseball.

== Professional career ==
The Atlanta Braves selected Tarasco in the 15th round of the 1988 Major League Baseball draft out of Santa Monica High School. He made his major league debut in 1993.

The Braves traded Tarasco with Roberto Kelly and Esteban Yan to the Montreal Expos for Marquis Grissom on April 6, 1995. As Montreal's starting right fielder, he hit .249 with 14 home runs, 40 runs batted in (RBI) and 24 stolen bases out of 27 attempts in 126 games with the Expos in 1995.

Originally expected to be the Expos' leadoff hitter entering the 1996 campaign, Tarasco was acquired by the Orioles from the Expos for Sherman Obando during spring training on March 13. The Orioles needed a left-handed-hitting reserve outfielder at the time. He was involved in a controversial play in the 1996 American League Championship Series while playing right field for the Baltimore Orioles. While fielding a fly ball hit by New York Yankees shortstop Derek Jeter, 12-year-old fan Jeffrey Maier reached over the fence and tried to catch the ball but instead deflected it into the stands. The umpires called a home run, although the correct call would have been fan interference. The play was the turning point in the series, which the Yankees won. Tarasco was claimed off waivers by the Reds from the Orioles on March 24, 1998. He had requested not to be demoted to the Rochester Red Wings.

Tarasco spent the remainder of his career as a part time player, often shuttling between the major and minor leagues. Tarasco and Jeter were teammates for a short time during the 1999 season.

In June 2002, Tarasco's New York Mets teammate Mark Corey suffered a seizure after the two players smoked marijuana outside of Shea Stadium. Under Major League Baseball drug policy at the time, because both players were first-time offenders, they were not subject to discipline from the league.

== Coaching career ==
=== MLB (2006–2021) ===
Tarasco began working for the Washington Nationals in 2006. For a time, Tarasco was the minor league coordinator for the Nationals. On November 14, 2012, the Nationals announced that Tarasco would join their coaching staff in the 2013 season to coach first base and outfield. Tarasco served as first base coach for the Nationals through the 2015 season. On October 5, 2015, the entire Nationals coaching staff, including Tarasco, were fired after a disappointing 2015 season.

On December 30, 2020, Tarasco was hired to be the first base coach for the New York Mets, replacing Tony DeFrancesco.

=== High school and college (2022–present) ===
From 2022 to 2023, Tarasco was varsity baseball coach for Great Oak High School in Temecula, California. On September 25, 2023, Tarasco became an assistant coach for San Diego State University under head coach Shaun Cole.

Sporting positions
Preceded by Trent Jewett	Washington Nationals First Base Coach; 2013–2015	Succeeded by Davey Lopes
Preceded by Tony DeFrancesco	New York Mets First Base Coach; 2021	Succeeded by Wayne Kirby
