= The Slide (Atlanta Braves) =

Baseball play

The Slide was a baseball play that occurred in Game 7 of the 1992 National League Championship Series (NLCS) on October 14, 1992, at Atlanta–Fulton County Stadium in Atlanta, Georgia. In 1992, the Atlanta Braves returned to the NLCS and once again defeated the Pittsburgh Pirates in seven games, culminating in a dramatic game seven win. Francisco Cabrera's two-out single that scored David Justice and Sid Bream capped a three-run rally in the bottom of the ninth inning that gave the Braves a 3–2 victory. It was the third time in post-season history that the tying and winning runs had scored on a single play in the ninth inning.

This marked the end of the three-year divisional championship run of the Pirates, who after the 1992 season lost Barry Bonds, Doug Drabek, and other key players from those championship teams. The Pirates did not have another winning season until 2013.

== Background ==
During the two-division era, from 1969 to 1993, the Philadelphia Phillies and the Pittsburgh Pirates together owned more than half of the division titles, having won a combined 15 of 25 championships during that span. They were also the only teams in the division to have won consecutive titles during that span.

In spring training of the 1987 season, Mike LaValliere was traded to the Pirates alongside Andy Van Slyke and Mike Dunne in exchange for fellow catcher Tony Peña. LaValliere and Van Slyke later became stalwarts on the hugely successful Pirates teams of the early 1990s, when Pittsburgh went to two consecutive National League Championship Series from 1990 to 1991. As center fielder for the Pirates, Van Slyke won five consecutive Gold Gloves from 1988 to 1992. In 1992, Van Slyke led the National League in hits with 199 and doubles with 45 while finishing second with a .324 batting average. Unfortunately for the Pirates, they lost the first two of their NLCS appearances, in 1990 to the eventual World champion Cincinnati Reds and in 1991 to the Atlanta Braves.

In March 1992, Pirates general manager Ted Simmons agreed to a deal with Atlanta Braves counterpart John Schuerholz to trade Barry Bonds, in exchange for Alejandro Peña, Keith Mitchell, and a player to be named later. Pirates manager Jim Leyland opposed the trade vehemently, and the proposal was rescinded. Bonds stayed with Pittsburgh and won his second MVP award that season. Bonds wound up hitting .311 with 34 homers and 103 RBIs in 1992.

On September 27, the Pittsburgh Pirates sealed their third consecutive National League East championship with a 4–2 victory over the New York Mets. Two days later, the Atlanta Braves wrapped up the National League West with a 6–0 shutout of the San Francisco Giants. Both teams pitched at least 20 shutouts each; the Braves led the Majors with 24 and the Pittsburgh Pirates finished second with 20.

=== Postseason ===
The Braves won three of the first four games in the series, but the Pirates won the next two. John Smoltz started Game 1 and 4 while Tom Glavine started Games 3 and 6 (which resulted in two wins for the former and losses for the latter) to set up a pivotal Game 7.

1991 NLCS Most Valuable Player Steve Avery meanwhile, extended his mastery over the Pittsburgh offense to 22 1/3 shutout innings before giving up five runs in the seventh inning of a Braves rout in Game 2. Pittsburgh knuckleballer Tim Wakefield won both of his starts against Braves star Glavine, throwing a complete game five-hitter in Game 3 of the NLCS and another complete game in Game 6 on three days' rest. After lasting only 1/3 of an inning and giving up four runs in his second start in Game 5, Avery kept the Pirates at bay in the crucial middle innings of Game 7 in relief of Smoltz.

Bob Walk meanwhile, tossed a complete game three-hitter in Game 5 to stave off elimination for the Pirates. In fact, the Pirates had come within one out of re-accomplishing the feats of the 1925 and 1979 Pirates in overcoming such a deficit in post-season play (albeit this time in the NLCS rather than the World Series): down 3-games-to-1 and facing elimination going into Game 5.

== The set up ==
=== National League Championship Series Game 7 ===
The deciding game of the NLCS featured the third matchup of the series between John Smoltz and Doug Drabek. Smoltz was an MVP candidate for the series, having started and won both of his games. Drabek had struggled in his two starts, failing to make it past the fifth inning in either matchup. However, the Pirates were carrying momentum from their previous two wins, having knocked out Steve Avery in the first inning and Tom Glavine in the second on their way to outscoring the Braves, 20–5, and looked to become the first team to win the NLCS after trailing, 3–1. The game that followed was regarded as one of the greatest ever, as years later MLB Network ranked it the fourth best game of all time.

The Pirates scored first as Alex Cole led off with a walk, advanced to third on a double by Andy Van Slyke, and scored on a sacrifice fly by Orlando Merced. The Pirates would add a run in the sixth as Jay Bell scored on a single by Van Slyke, and the lead held up as Drabek pitched his best game of the series in holding the Braves scoreless. The closest the Braves got to breaking through was in the sixth inning, when Drabek allowed three consecutive singles to Mark Lemke, Jeff Treadway, and Otis Nixon to load the bases. Jeff Blauser, however, lined into an unassisted double play and Terry Pendleton lined out to Barry Bonds in left to end the threat.

An incident involving the umpires early in the game set a different tone that would come into play later on. In the second inning, home plate umpire John McSherry became ill and complained of nausea and dizziness. After being checked out by the stadium medical staff, McSherry was removed from the game as a precaution and first base umpire Randy Marsh was summoned over from his position to take over behind the plate. The move gave both Smoltz and Drabek a different target to hit for strikes as Marsh had a consistent strike zone that was much tighter than McSherry's. This was also the first public sign of what would later prove to be fatal cardiac issues for the veteran umpire; it was one of five times he would leave games with similar symptoms, and in 1996, on Opening Day in Cincinnati, McSherry went into cardiac arrest and died on the field at Riverfront Stadium while behind the plate.

John Smoltz left the seventh game trailing, but ended up with a no-decision as the Braves mounted a dramatic ninth-inning comeback. Smoltz would ultimately record two wins over 3 games started with only 6 earned runs allowed over 20 1/3 innings (the most innings of any pitcher in the series), and 19 strikeouts. However, with the Pirates at the time, leading the Braves in Game 7, Tim Wakefield was poised to be named NLCS MVP until the Braves rallied for three runs in the bottom of the ninth off Stan Belinda.

Entering the bottom of the ninth, Doug Drabek had only allowed five hits in eight shutout innings and the Pirates were three outs away from advancing to their first World Series since 1979. If the lead held, Braves manager Bobby Cox would have become the first manager in the era of seven-game LCS play to have blown two 3–1 series leads and lost; Cox previously had seen this happen in 1985, when his Toronto Blue Jays lost to the eventual World Series champion Kansas City Royals after being one victory away from going to the World Series.

Pirates manager Jim Leyland sent Drabek out for the ninth to complete the shutout, with the middle of the Braves' order due up. The first batter, Terry Pendleton, doubled. David Justice followed by hitting a sharp grounder to José Lind, who was eventually awarded a Gold Glove at second base for the season. Lind, however, misplayed the ball and runners were at the corners with nobody out. Drabek then walked Sid Bream on four pitches, which moved the tying run into scoring position and loaded the bases.

=== The play ===
The Pirates carried a 2–0 lead into the bottom of the ninth inning under the pitching of their ace, Doug Drabek, needing just three outs to make the World Series. However, Drabek gave up a leadoff double to Terry Pendleton, then allowed another runner, David Justice, on an infield error by second baseman José Lind. After Drabek walked Bream to load the bases, Pirates manager Jim Leyland pulled him out of the game. After reliever Stan Belinda replaced him on the mound, he induced a sacrifice fly from Ron Gant, scoring Pendleton from third to cut Pittsburgh's lead to 2–1. Belinda then walked Damon Berryhill and retired Brian Hunter on a popup.

The next hitter was Braves third-string catcher Francisco Cabrera, who had batted only ten times in the 1992 regular season. On a 2–1 count, Cabrera belted a single to left field over shortstop Jay Bell. Justice scored easily to tie the game. Pirates left fielder and eventual NL Most Valuable Player Barry Bonds fielded the ball as Bream, one of the slowest runners in baseball, went as fast as he could towards home plate. Braves third-base coach Jimy Williams waved home Bream, calculating that Bonds could not complete the difficult throw home in time to catch Bream. Bonds's throw arrived first, but it was slightly offline and bounced on its way towards the first-base line. As soon as catcher Mike LaValliere received the ball, he desperately lunged toward the plate to tag Bream out, but Bream was able to slide just underneath the tag to score the winning run and send the Braves to their second World Series in a row.

== The calls ==
He hacked at the 2-0, now the 2-1. Line-drive and a base-hit! Justice has scored the tying run, Bream to the plate...and he is SAFE! Safe at the plate! The Braves go to the World Series! (97-second announcer pause, amid crowd noise.) The unlikeliest of heroes wins the National League Championship Series for the Atlanta Braves. Francisco Cabrera, who had only ten at-bats in the major leagues during the regular season, singled through the left side, scoring Sid Bream from second base with the winning run. Bream, who's had five knee operations in his lifetime, just beat the tag from his ex-mate Mike LaValliere and Atlanta pulls out Game 7 with three runs in the bottom of the ninth inning. This place is bedlam. There will be no second nightmare for Bobby Cox. Final score in Game 7 of the National League Championship Series: the Braves 3 and the Pirates 2.

— CBS Sports announcer Sean McDonough.

Swung, line drive, left field! One run is in! Here comes Bream! Here’s the throw to the plate! He is...SAFE! BRAVES WIN! BRAVES WIN! BRAVES WIN! BRAVES WIN! Braves win!

— Atlanta Braves broadcaster Skip Caray on WBIN (AM).

== Aftermath ==
The Braves lost the World Series to the Toronto Blue Jays, however. Sid Bream started five of the six games, scoring a run in Game 2 and getting two hits in Game 3. He batted .200 in the series, which Toronto won in six games. "It's something we can tell our grandkids," reported Bream. "We played in two of the greatest World Series of all time. But at the same time, it's hard to tell your grandkids, 'We're the ones who never won.'"

Following the loss, Barry Bonds and star teammate Doug Drabek were expected to command salaries too high for the Pirates to again sign them. After the 1992 season, the Pirates front office set out to rebuild the team, giving up several high-payroll players in favor of a younger crew. Bonds and Drabek soon left the Pirates via free agency, signing with the San Francisco Giants and Houston Astros, respectively.

The March 1993 issue of Baseball Digest pronounced it the greatest baseball comeback ever, as did John Smoltz immediately after the game. A 2006 study by the Pittsburgh Post-Gazette pronounced Cabrera's game-winning single the eighth-"clutchest" hit in MLB history. ESPN called the Pirates' defeat the eighth most painful in baseball history. Don Ohlmeyer, the former head of NBC Sports and President of NBC West Coast, supposedly called the event "one of the most exciting baseball moments he had ever seen," albeit regretting the time of day it took place.

Also in 1993, the Braves signed Cy Young Award winning pitcher Greg Maddux from the Chicago Cubs, leading many baseball insiders to declare the team's pitching staff the best in baseball. The 1993 team posted a franchise-best 104 wins after a dramatic pennant race with the San Francisco Giants, who won 103 games. The Braves needed a stunning 55–19 finish to edge out the Giants, who led the Braves by nine games in the standings as late as August 11. However, the Braves fell in the NLCS to the Philadelphia Phillies in six games.

In 1994, in a realignment of the National League's divisions following the 1993 expansion, the Braves moved to the Eastern Division. This realignment was the main cause of the team's heated rivalry with the New York Mets during the mid-to-late 1990s.

When the National League realigned into three divisions, the Pirates were originally supposed to stay in the East while the Braves were to be moved to the newly created National League Central. However, the Braves, wanting to form a natural rivalry with the expansion Florida Marlins, elected to be placed in the East. Despite the Marlins offering to go to the Central, the Pirates instead gave up their spot in the East to the Braves. Since then, the Pirates have tried several times unsuccessfully to be placed back in the East.

The player's strike cut short the 1994 season, prior to the division championships, with the Braves six games behind the Montreal Expos with 48 games left to play.

Following the 1996 season, Jim Leyland decided to quit after 11 seasons spent with the Pirates in order to manage a contender despite a contract that ran to 2000 with a salary of $1 million, stating that it was not a tough decision but a sad one, noting his dissatisfaction with owner Kevin McClatchy on trades and salary cutting.

The Braves returned strong the following strike-shortened (144 games instead of the customary 162) year and beat the Cleveland Indians in the 1995 World Series. This squelched claims by many Braves critics that they were the "Buffalo Bills of Baseball" (January 1996 issue of Beckett Baseball Card Monthly). With this World Series victory, the Braves became the first team in Major League Baseball to win world championships in three different cities. With their strong pitching as a constant, the Braves appeared in the 1996 and 1999 World Series (losing both to the New York Yankees, managed by Joe Torre, a former Braves manager), and had a streak of division titles from 1991 to 2005 (three in the Western Division and eleven in the Eastern) interrupted only in 1994 when the strike ended the season early. Pitching was not the only constant in the Braves organization —Cox was the Braves' manager, while John Schuerholz remained the team's GM until after the 2007 season, when he was promoted to team president. Terry Pendleton finished his playing career elsewhere but returned to the Braves system as the hitting coach.

As previously mentioned, the Pirates were unable to produce a winning season until 2013, accumulating a 20-year losing streak – the longest in any of the four major professional North American sports leagues. The closest the Pirates had come to fielding a winning team during that period was the 1997 team, which finished second in the NL Central despite having a losing record and a payroll of $9 million. The 1997 team was eliminated from playoff contention during the season's final week. In 2012, they finished in 4th place with a 79–83 record and were not eliminated until late September.

On September 23, 2013, the Pirates' magic number to secure a playoff spot was 2. The Pirates needed a win that night against the Chicago Cubs at Wrigley Field, plus a loss by the Washington Nationals, in order to clinch a playoff berth. Later that night, a loss by the Nationals ensured the Pirates' first playoff berth since this game.

== See also ==
- List of nicknamed MLB games and plays
