= Todd Worrell =

American baseball player (born 1959)

- Worrell in 1986 photocard
- Pitcher
- Born: September 28, 1959 (age 67); Arcadia, California, U.S.
- Batted: Right Threw: Right

MLB debut
- August 28, 1985, for the St. Louis Cardinals

Last MLB appearance
- September 25, 1997, for the Los Angeles Dodgers

MLB statistics
- Win–loss record: 50–52
- Earned run average: 3.09
- Strikeouts: 628
- Saves: 256
- Stats at Baseball Reference

Teams
- St. Louis Cardinals (1985–1989, 1992); Los Angeles Dodgers (1993–1997)

Career highlights and awards
- 3× All-Star (1988, 1995, 1996); NL Rookie of the Year (1986); NL Rolaids Relief Man Award (1986); 2× NL saves leader (1986, 1996)

Todd Roland Worrell (born September 28, 1959) is an American former professional baseball relief pitcher. He played all or part of eleven seasons for the St. Louis Cardinals and Los Angeles Dodgers of Major League Baseball, serving as those teams' closer for most of his seasons from 1985 through 1997. During his playing career, Worrell was a three-time National League (NL) All-Star.

Born and raised in Arcadia, California, Worrell attended Biola University. He seldom pitched until his senior year, but his 94 mile-per-hour fastball caught the attention of a scout for the Cardinals, who made him their first round draft pick in 1982. He was expected to be a starting pitcher, but he was moved to the bullpen in 1985, when the Cardinals called him up for the playoff race. Worrell posted a 2.91 earned run average (ERA) in 17 games at the end of the year. In the 1985 World Series, he tied a World Series record by striking out six consecutive hitters, but the Cardinals lost to the Kansas City Royals in seven games. Still considered a rookie in 1986, Worrell led the NL with 36 saves, winning the NL Rookie of the Year Award and the Rolaids Relief Man Award.

In 1987, he became the first pitcher to start his career with back-to-back 30-save seasons, and he made seven appearances in the playoffs that year, as the Cardinals lost the 1987 World Series to the Minnesota Twins in seven games. He was selected to the NL All-Star team in 1988 and finished third in the NL in saves, but he then injured his ulnar nerve in 1989, forcing him to undergo Tommy John surgery. The recovery from the operation, as well as a later rotator cuff tear, forced him to miss all of 1990 and 1991. Lee Smith had been acquired to close in his absence, but Worrell served as his set-up man in 1992, posting a 2.11 ERA. After the season, Worrell became a free agent.

On December 9, 1992, Worrell signed a three-year contract with the Dodgers. Expected to serve as their closer, he battled injuries his first two years in Los Angeles, prompting the Los Angeles Daily News to call him "perhaps the biggest free-agent bust in baseball this season" in 1993. However, he was selected to the NL All-Star team back-to-back years in 1995 and 1996, recording 32 saves in 1995 and leading the NL in saves with 44 in 1996. That season, he finished fifth in NL Cy Young Award voting and 21st in NL Most Valuable Player Award voting, as the Dodgers reached the playoffs before getting swept in the NL Division Series by the Atlanta Braves. Worrell pitched one final season, recording 35 saves but posting a 5.28 ERA in 1997 before retiring. He threw a fastball and a slider.

== Early life ==
Todd Roland Worrell was born on September 28, 1959, in Arcadia, California. His middle name, Roland, was also his father's first name. Worrell was raised in Arcadia, and his father frequently took him to Los Angeles Dodgers games at nearby Dodger Stadium when he was growing up.

== College career ==
In 1978, he enrolled as a Bible student at Biola University in La Mirada, California, where he also played baseball.

At Biola, Worrell played a number of different positions. He was used mostly as a catcher during his junior year, though he also pitched as a long reliever. As a senior, he was used as a pitcher more often, but he played the outfield on days when he was not pitching. He was throwing up to 94 miles per hour (mph) his senior year, when he caught the attention of Steve Flores, a scout for the St. Louis Cardinals who attended a Biola game to watch Tony Woods of Whittier College play.

== Professional career ==
=== Draft and minor leagues ===
Flores was impressed with how hard Worrell threw, and the Cardinals selected him in the first round of the 1982 Major League Baseball (MLB) draft. The Cardinals were hoping Worrell would be a starting pitcher for them in the future. He began his professional career in 1982 with the Erie Cardinals of the Single-A short season New York-Penn League. In nine games (eight starts), he had a 4–1 record, a 3.31 earned run average (ERA), 57 strikeouts, 15 walks, and 52 hits allowed in 51 2/3 innings pitched. By his second professional season, he was already pitching for the Louisville Redbirds of the Triple-A American Association. Manager Jim Fregosi was impressed with the prospect, saying he had not seen a pitcher with a better arm since he managed Nolan Ryan. Worrell had a 4–2 record in 14 starts for Louisville, but his ERA was 4.74 and he had almost as many walks (42) as strikeouts (46). He also spent part of the year with the Arkansas Travelers of the Double-A Texas League, posting a 5–2 record and a 3.07 ERA in 10 starts.

In 1984, Worrell made 18 starts for Arkansas again, posting a 3–10 record, a 4.49 ERA, 88 strikeouts, 67 walks, and 109 hits allowed in 100 1/3 innings. His ERA was lower (2.09) in eight games (seven starts) with the St. Petersburg Cardinals of the Single-A Florida State League, where he had a 3–2 record, 33 strikeouts, 24 walks, and 41 hits allowed in 47 1/3 innings. By 1985, he was "languishing in the minors," according to Peter Gammons of Sports Illustrated. "I'd throw great for three or four innings every start, then something would happen," Worrell said. He began the season with Louisville as a starter once again, but Fregosi grew tired of waiting for him to improve and moved him to the bullpen in the middle of the season. As a relief pitcher, Worrell struck out 43 batters in under 31 innings before being promoted to the majors for the first time on August 27.

=== St. Louis Cardinals (1985–1989, 1992) ===
==== 1985 ====
Worrell joined a Cardinals team that was fighting to make the playoffs. He made his MLB debut on August 28, 1985, pitching 1 2/3 scoreless innings in relief in a 7–6 loss to the Cincinnati Reds. Though no runs were charged to him, he allowed two inherited runners to score as the Reds tied the game. After suffering another blown save on September 8, he picked up his first save on September 13 against the Chicago Cubs, striking out four in 2 1/3 innings and allowing only one run, a home run to Jody Davis, in a 9–3 victory. His ERA was 5.68 through September 8, but Worrell posted a 1.76 ERA thereafter, converting five saves in five opportunities through the end of the year as the Cardinals won the National League (NL) East Division title. In 17 games (all in relief), he had a 3–0 record, a 2.91 ERA, 17 strikeouts, seven walks, and 17 hits allowed in 21 2/3 innings.

==== 1985 playoffs ====
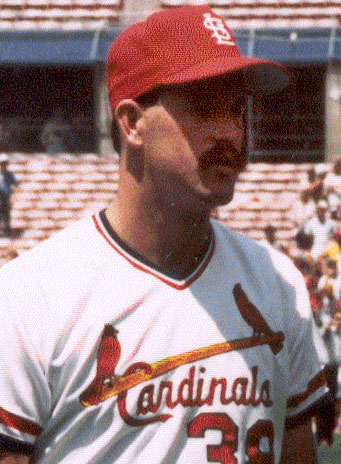

The Cardinals faced the Dodgers in the NL Championship Series (NLCS), and Worrell pitched in four of the six games of the series, making scoreless appearances in Games 1, 3, and 5. Relieving Joaquin Andujar to begin the seventh inning of Game 6, with the score tied at four, Worrell threw a scoreless seventh inning, then gave up a home run to Mike Marshall to start the eighth. He retired the next three hitters he faced, then got the win after Jack Clark hit a three-run home run in the ninth, helping the Cardinals defeat the Dodgers 7–5 and win the series in six games. In Game 1 of the World Series against the Kansas City Royals, Worrell relieved John Tudor with two outs in the seventh and runners on first and third. After walking Lonnie Smith, Worrell got Willie Wilson to pop out to end the inning. In the eighth, he nearly gave up a home run to George Brett, but Andy Van Slyke caught the ball at the fence, and Worrell earned the save as the Cardinals won 3–1.

In Game 5, he struck out all six batters he faced, but the Cardinals lost the game 6–1. However, he joined Hod Eller and Moe Drabowsky as the only pitchers to strike out six hitters in a row in World Series play. Worrell relieved Ken Dayley to start the ninth inning of Game 6, with the Cardinals leading 1–0 and three outs away from clinching a World Series title. The leadoff hitter for Kansas City, Jorge Orta, hit a ground ball to the mound that first baseman Clark fielded, then threw to Worrell, who had covered first. The throw narrowly beat Orta to the base, but umpire Don Denkinger mistakenly called him safe. Worrell went on to allow a couple more runners to reach base, then gave up a pinch-hit single to Dane Iorg that won the game for the Royals by a score of 2–1. The Cardinals went on to lose the World Series in seven games.

==== 1986 ====
By 1986, Worrell was the Cardinals' "ace reliever," according to Mitch Lawrence of the Dallas Morning News. On April 10, the St. Louis closer relieved Rick Ownbey with two runners on in the seventh inning of a game against the Cubs, with the Cardinals leading 3–1. Worrell allowed one of the runners to score but pitched three scoreless innings, earning the save as the Cardinals won 4–2. Against the Philadelphia Phillies on June 21 and 22, he struck out four batters in 1 2/3 and four batters in 1 1/3 innings, respectively, earning the win in the first game and the save in the second. He entered another game against the Phillies on July 30 with one out in the seventh, the bases loaded, and the Cardinals only up by two runs. Worrell retired Mike Schmidt and Von Hayes on fly balls without any runs scoring, then threw two more scoreless innings for the save when the Cardinals won 6–3. Still considered a rookie in 1986, Worrell's 2.08 ERA and league-leading 36 saves netted him that year's NL Rookie of the Year Award, as well as the NL Rolaids Relief Man Award. His 36 saves were a record for MLB rookies at the time, though this has since been surpassed by multiple pitchers. In 74 games, the third highest-total in the NL, Worrell had a 9–10 record and struck out 73 hitters in 103 2/3 innings. Though he had 36 saves, he also blew 10 save opportunities as well.

==== 1987 ====
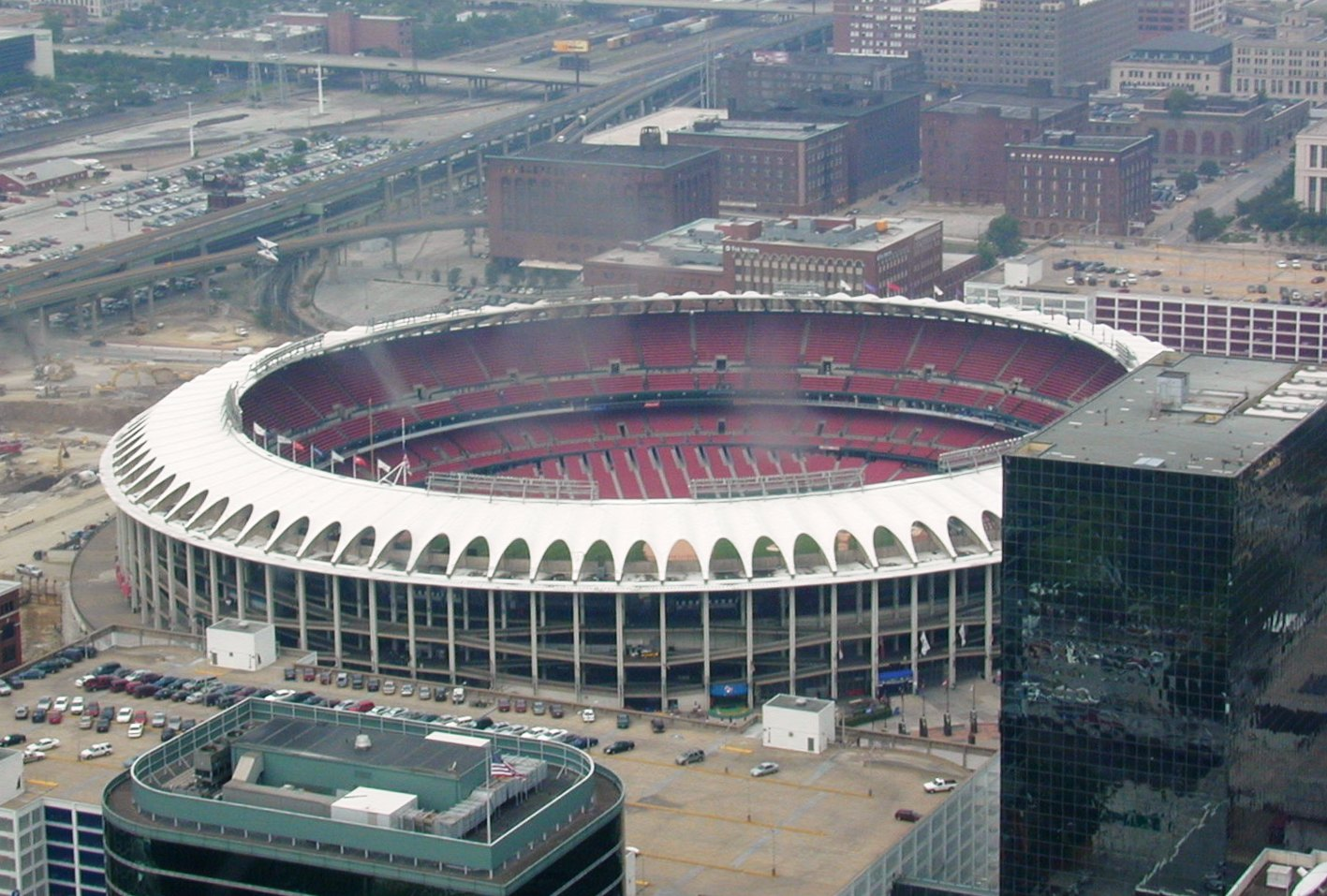
Busch Stadium was Worrell's home ballpark while he was with the Cardinals.

Worrell's 1987 season got off to a "poor start," according to the Associated Press; he blew saves in three games in a row from April 29 through May 2 and posted a 10.57 ERA through May 4. Thereafter, he posted a 1.80 ERA in 18 more games through June 10, at which point he had 14 saves, a total only surpassed in the NL by Steve Bedrosian's and Lee Smith's 15. Against the Atlanta Braves on August 29, he entered a game in the ninth inning with runners on second and third, two outs, and the Cardinals up 4–2. After intentionally walking Ken Griffey, Sr., he got Ted Simmons to fly out to end the inning. On September 19, he relieved Joe Magrane in a game against the Cubs with one out in the seventh, the bases loaded, the Cardinals up 5–3, and Ryne Sandberg at the plate. Worrell struck out Sandberg and Andre Dawson to end the inning with no runs scoring, then threw two more scoreless innings for the save.

In the second game of a doubleheader against the Montreal Expos on September 29, Worrell relieved Greg Mathews with no outs in the seventh, runners on first and second, and the Cardinals up 3–0. He did not allow either of the runners to score and pitched three scoreless innings for the save. Worrell finished the year with 33 saves, becoming the first major league pitcher to have at least 30 saves in each of his first two full seasons. Only Bedrosian (40) and Smith (36) had more saves than Worrell, but he blew 10 saves as well for the second year in a row. In 75 games, he had an 8–6 record, a 2.66 ERA, 92 strikeouts, 34 walks, and 86 hits allowed in 94 2/3 innings pitched.

==== 1987 playoffs ====
Winners of the NL East in 1987, the Cardinals faced the San Francisco Giants, whom Worrell had posted a 7.36 ERA against, in the NLCS. Worrell entered Game 1 in relief of Mathews with one out on the eighth and a runner on first with the Cardinals leading 5–2. He got one out but gave up an RBI double to Candy Maldonado and left the bases loaded before getting replaced by Dayley, who finished the game without letting any more runs score to earn the save. Worrell gave up one run in the final three innings of Game 3, earning the save in a 6–5 Cardinal victory. In Game 6, Worrell relieved Tudor with one out in the eighth and the Cardinals leading 1–0. He got the last two outs of the inning and the first out of the ninth, then was replaced by Dayley because a left-hander was due up. Thinking he might want to use Worrell later on if right-handed hitters came up later, Cardinals manager Whitey Herzog left Worrell in the game, moving him to right field. He spent the rest of the game there, as Dayley retired both of the hitters he faced.

The Cardinals won the NLCS in seven games, earning a trip to the 1987 World Series, where they faced the Minnesota Twins. Worrell pitched 2/3 of an inning in an 8–4 Game 2 loss, then threw two scoreless innings to earn the save in Game 3. He entered Game 5 in the eighth inning with two outs and the Cardinals up 4–0 but runners on first and second. Worrell gave up a triple to Gary Gaetti that scored both of the runners, but he got Tom Brunansky to fly out to end the inning, then threw a scoreless ninth to earn the save. In Game 7, Worrell entered in the sixth with the game tied at two, no outs, and runners on first and second. He retired two of the first three hitters he faced, but Roy Smalley walked to load the bases. Greg Gagne then hit a sharp ground ball and beat the throw to first base for an RBI single that gave the Twins the lead. That run was not charged to Worrell, but he did allow another run in the eighth as the Twins won 4–2, clinching a World Series championship for Minnesota.

==== 1988 ====
On April 27, 1988, Worrell relieved Bob Forsch with one out in the seventh inning, runners on second and third base, and the Cardinals clinging to a 2–0 lead over the San Diego Padres. He intentionally walked John Kruk to load the bases, then gave up a sacrifice fly to Garry Templeton. However, he struck out Tim Flannery to end the inning, then pitched two more scoreless innings for the save. Against the Braves on May 27, he pitched two scoreless innings to pick up the save in a 5–2 victory. He retired all six hitters he faced on June 8, earning the save in a 5–2 victory over the New York Mets. At midseason, he was a part of the All-Star Game for the first time in his career, throwing a scoreless ninth inning in the NL's 2–1 loss to the American League. He pitched two scoreless innings to earn a save on September 8 in a 1–0 victory over the Phillies. Worrell finished the year with 32 saves in 41 opportunities; the 32 saves helped him rank third in the NL, behind John Franco (39) and Jim Gott (34). In 68 games, he had a 5–9 record, a 3.00 ERA, 78 strikeouts, 34 walks, and 69 hits allowed in 90 innings.

==== 1989–91 ====
In 1989, Worrell got a "whopping" raise according to the Associated Press, as his salary was increased from $215,000 to $875,000; Worrell had threatened to take the Cardinals to arbitration if they did not offer him at least $862,500.

On April 8, he threw a season-high 2 2/3 scoreless innings in an eventual 5–4, 12-inning loss to the Phillies. He entered a game against the Expos on June 15 with one out in the ninth, runners on first and second, and the Cardinals trailing 3–2. Worrell finished the inning without allowing a run to score, then pitched a scoreless tenth, becoming the winner when Tom Pagnozzi had an RBI single in the bottom of the tenth to give the Cardinals a 4–3 victory. Through July 14, his ERA was 1.14.

On September 4, Worrell was pitching for his 127th career save, which would have tied him with Bruce Sutter for the Cardinals' career record. While making a pitch, he injured his ulnar nerve and had to leave the game, ending his season. Though he only had 20 saves at that point, he had only blown three all season. In 47 games, he had a 3–5 record, a 2.96 ERA, 41 strikeouts, 26 walks, and 42 hits allowed in 51 2/3 innings. On December 1, he underwent Tommy John surgery, performed by Dr. Frank Jobe, to repair the damage; the recovery kept him out for the entire 1990 season. In 1991, as he was attempting to return, he was diagnosed with a rotator cuff tear. He had arthroscopic surgery to repair it on July 31, forcing him to miss the rest of that season as well.

==== 1992 ====
By 1992 spring training, Worrell appeared to have recovered; manager Joe Torre said his fastball and slider were back to their normal speeds. Worrell came back in 1992 but just as a set-up man, as the Cardinals had acquired veteran Lee Smith in his absence; Smith had led the NL in saves in 1991 with 47. Used 10 times in April, Worrell pitched 11 scoreless innings. On August 25, he threw a scoreless ninth and tenth inning in an eventual 5–3, 13-inning win over the Houston Astros. He had back-to-back saves on September 5 and 6 in consecutive victories over the Giants. On September 24, he threw a scoreless ninth and tenth innings as well in an eventual 4–3, 14-inning win over the Mets. In 67 games, he had a 5–3 record, a 2.11 ERA, 64 strikeouts, 25 walks, and 45 hits allowed in 64 innings. Though he was not the closer (Smith again led the NL with 43 saves), Worrell had five saves as well. After the season, he became a free agent. Torre said of Worrell's performance in 1992, "He's a perfect set-up man for Smith. I'd like to have him back."

Worrell had 129 saves with the Cardinals, briefly the team record until Smith broke it in 1993.

=== Los Angeles Dodgers (1993–1997) ===
==== 1993 ====
Worrell signed a three-year, $9.5 million contract with the Los Angeles Dodgers on December 9, 1992. Because they feared the Braves would sign him, the Dodgers allowed Worrell to skip having a physical examination before signing his contract. Shoulder tendinitis limited him to 4 2/3 innings pitched in spring training. He began the 1993 season as the team's closer but hurt his right elbow in only the second game of the year and went on the disabled list, losing the closer role to Gott in his absence. Returning on May 28, Worrell had a 14.40 ERA in five games through June 10 before going on the disabled list again, this time not returning until July 17. His ERA rose to 10.54 on August 5 before Worrell posted a 2.74 ERA over his next 20 games. From September 14 through 22, he converted four saves in five opportunities while Gott was resting with an injured shoulder. Worrell made 35 appearances for the Dodgers in 1993, posting a 1–1 record, a 6.05 ERA, 31 strikeouts, 11 walks, and 46 hits allowed in 38 2/3 innings pitched. He converted five saves but blew three. A 1993 article by the Los Angeles Daily News called him "perhaps the biggest free-agent bust in baseball this season."

==== 1994 ====
In 1994, Worrell was set to assume his role as the closer. However, he went on the disabled list in May and missed 17 games with a rib-cage pull. After pitching a scoreless inning in his return on May 24, he blew saves in two straight games, then was pulled from a game on May 29 with one out in the ninth after allowing a walk and a single. A disappointed Worrell said after the game, "I guess the only way I can respond is to say I've never been taken out of a game before as the stopper. The job of the stopper always has been you win or lose with him. At least, that's the way I've been handled in the past." After that comment, he stopped talking to reporters for about a month. On August 8, after pitching in three straight games, Worrell entered a game against the Colorado Rockies in the ninth inning with the Dodgers leading 6–3. He allowed three runs before getting removed, and Gott allowed another one of his runners to score, giving him the loss as Colorado won 7–6. After the game, Worrell finally spoke to reporters again but was critical, saying, "If you knew anything about baseball, you wouldn’t have to hide behind players' quotes." In 38 games, Worrell had a 6–5 record, a 4.29 ERA, 44 strikeouts, 12 walks, and 37 hits allowed in 42 innings. He converted 11 saves but blew eight as well.

==== 1995 ====
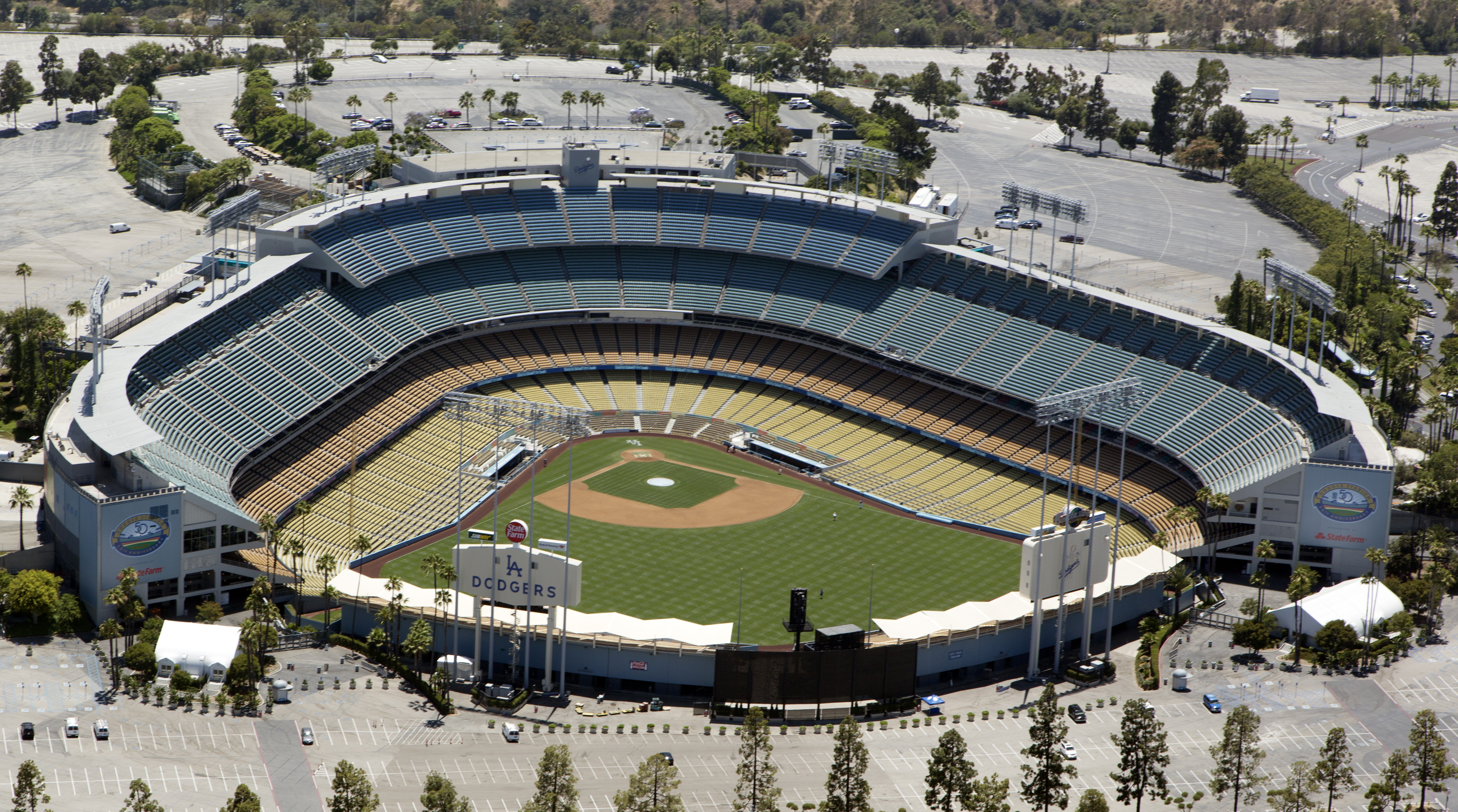
Dodger Stadium was Worrell's home ballpark during his tenure with the Dodgers.

In 1995, Worrell opened the year with a scoreless streak, not allowing a run until July. Counting his final game of the 1994 season, he threw 26 2/3 scoreless innings, a streak not broken until he gave up a two-run home run to Andres Galarraga on July 1. The Dodger closer again, he had just four saves entering June but saved eight games that month, without blowing an opportunity. For the first time since 1988, he was selected to the NL All-Star team for the second time, though he did not pitch in the game. On July 23, against the Florida Marlins, he entered the game with one out in the eighth, one runner on base, and the Dodgers leading 3–1. Worrell struck out Jeff Conine but then walked the next two hitters to load the bases. However, he struck out Tommy Gregg to end the inning, then allowed just one run in the ninth, preserving the lead as the Dodgers won 4–2. He threw a scoreless inning on September 25 to pick up the save in a 4–3 victory over Colorado. Worrell converted 32 saves in 36 opportunities, ranking fourth in the NL in saves. In 59 games, he had a 4–1 record, a 2.02 ERA, 61 strikeouts, 19 walks, and 50 walks in 62 1/3 innings.

==== 1996 ====
Worrell enjoyed what reporter Jason Reid called "his best season" in 1996. Dating back to September 2 of the previous year, he had a streak of 24 scoreless innings that lasted until Jeff King had an RBI single against him in a 4–2 loss to the Pittsburgh Pirates on May 5. He saved five games from June 13 through June 19. For the second year in a row, he was selected to the NL All-Star team, pitching a scoreless eighth in the NL's 6–0 victory. In August, he had 10 saves, including saves in six straight appearances from August 22 through August 30. After blowing his ninth save of the year on September 1, he converted his remaining seven save opportunities that month as the Dodgers clinched a trip to the playoffs by winning the NL Wild Card. Worrell finished the season with a career-high 44 saves, tied with Jeff Brantley's total for the NL lead and a Dodger single-season record until Eric Gagne had 52 in 2002. In 72 games, he had a 4–6 record, a 3.03 ERA, 66 strikeouts, 15 walks, and 70 hits allowed in 65 1/3 innings pitched. He finished fifth in NL Cy Young Award voting and finished 21st in NL Most Valuable Player Award voting. Worrell threw a scoreless ninth in Game 2 of the NL Division Series against the Braves, but that was his only appearance of the series as Atlanta swept Los Angeles in three games.

==== 1997 ====
In 1997, Worrell was frequently booed by Dodgers fans. One of his worst games of the year came in the second game of a doubleheader on September 25, when he entered in the ninth with the Dodgers leading the Pirates by a score of 3–1. After walking Eddie Williams to lead off the ninth inning, Worrell allowed back-to-back home runs to Joe Randa and Mark Smith as the Pirates rallied to win 4–3. Though he remained in the closer role all year, manager Bill Russell started bypassing him in favor of Darren Dreifort or Scott Radinsky in September. One highlight for Worrell came on September 5, when he got his 126th save for the Dodgers, breaking Jim Brewer's team record. However, he would only have one more save all season. In 65 games, he had a 2–6 record, a 5.28 ERA, 61 strikeouts, 23 walks, 60 hits allowed, and a career-high 12 home runs allowed in 59 2/3 innings pitched. Worrell had 35 saves but blew nine, topped only by the 11 blown by Greg McMichael of the Mets. He retired following the 1997 season, with agent Rich Bry explaining the decision was because of a desire to spend more time with his family. His 127 saves with the Dodgers were the team's record for a few years, until Jeff Shaw recorded his 128th with Los Angeles in 2001.

== Pitching style ==
Worrell threw a fastball and slider. A 1986 Sports Illustrated article said he consistently threw in the 93–94 mph range, but Hal Bock of the Associated Press wrote in 1987 that Worrell's fastball travelled 90 mph. When he returned from the Tommy John surgery in 1992, the fastball was travelling at 95 mph, and the slider was averaging 90 mph. Bock wrote that Worrell's fastball dared hitters, as if it were saying, "Hit me if you can." "When I come in and there are runners on base, I don't think that if they score, they're not credited to me," Worrell said. "You have to take a little pride, take the responsibility. They're yours."

== Personal life ==
Worrell and his wife, Jamie, have three sons and one daughter —Josh, Jeremy, Jacob, and Hannah each of whom played baseball or Softball at Indiana Wesleyan University in Marion, Indiana. Josh was drafted in the 30th round of the 2009 MLB draft by the Royals and played three seasons in the low minors. Todd's younger brother, Tim, played in MLB from 1993 through 2006, serving as a closer himself with the Giants in 2003 and the Phillies in 2004. On June 13, 1997, they both earned a save, becoming the second pair of brothers to do so on one day. After retiring, Todd served as the pitching coach at Westminster Christian Academy in St. Louis. One student athlete he coached, Jacob Turner, went on to be a first-round draft pick by the Tigers in 2009. As of 2020, Worrell's son Jacob is Westminster's pitching coach. Todd also used to be the pitching coach for the River City Rascals, a former franchise in the independent Frontier League.

For three years, Worrell served as president of the Fellowship of Christian Athletes; he has been involved in the organization for more than 14 years.

== See also ==
- List of Major League Baseball annual saves leaders
- List of St. Louis Cardinals team records
