= Dane Iorg =

American baseball player (born 1950)

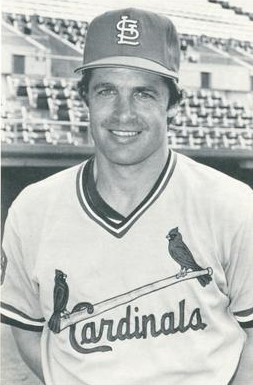
- Outfielder / First baseman
- Born: May 11, 1950 (age 76); Eureka, California, U.S.
- Batted: Left Threw: Right

MLB debut
- April 9, 1977, for the Philadelphia Phillies

Last MLB appearance
- October 4, 1986, for the San Diego Padres

MLB statistics
- Batting average: .276
- Home runs: 14
- Runs batted in: 216
- Stats at Baseball Reference

Teams
- Philadelphia Phillies (1977); St. Louis Cardinals (1977–1984); Kansas City Royals (1984–1985); San Diego Padres (1986)

Career highlights and awards
- 2× World Series champion (1982, 1985)

Dane Charles Iorg (/ˈɔːrdʒ/ ORJ; born May 11, 1950) is an American former professional baseball first baseman and outfielder, who played in Major League Baseball (MLB) from (1977–1986) for four teams, including eight seasons spent with the St. Louis Cardinals. While playing for the Kansas City Royals, Iorg produced the game-winning hit in Game 6 of the 1985 World Series. His brother Garth also played in MLB.

== Baseball career ==
Iorg was born in Eureka, California, and he grew up in the nearby town of Blue Lake. He graduated from Arcata High School, in Arcata, California. He began his playing career with the Philadelphia Phillies in April 1977, but by that June the club traded him along with outfielder Rick Bosetti and pitcher Tom Underwood to the St. Louis Cardinals for outfielder Bake McBride and pitcher Steve Waterbury.

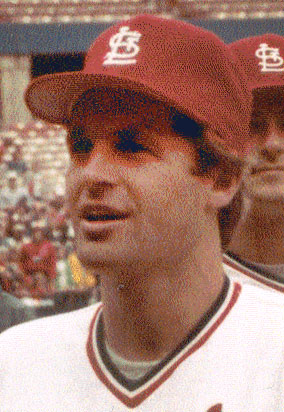
Iorg in 1983 with the Cardinals

During the strike-shortened 1981 season, he led the Cardinals with a .327 batting-average. In the 1982 World Series, Iorg played for the Cardinals, primarily as their World Series designated hitter (the entire 1982 World Series was played under American League rules) and batted .529 with 9 hits in 17 at-bats as the Cardinals defeated the Milwaukee Brewers in seven games. On July 15, 1984, the Cardinals sold Iorg to the Kansas City Royals.

Iorg is perhaps best known for his game-winning hit in Game 6 of the 1985 World Series as a member of the Kansas City Royals against his old team, St. Louis. The hit came during one of only two at-bats that Iorg received during the series. The Cardinals had led the series three games to two before Game 6; the game is remembered for first-base umpire Don Denkinger's controversial "safe" call of Royals hitter Jorge Orta on a ground ball to lead off the bottom of the ninth. Iorg batted later in the inning with one out and the bases loaded. The Royals trailed, 1–0, until Iorg's single allowed Onix Concepción and Jim Sundberg to score. The Royals went on to win Game 7, 11–0, and give Kansas City their first World Series championship.

== Personal life ==
Several members of the Iorg family have played collegiate or professional baseball. Dane's brother Garth played for the Toronto Blue Jays and coached for the Milwaukee Brewers. The brothers played against each other in the 1985 American League Championship Series. Iorg's son Seth played baseball for BYU in 2004 and 2005, as did his son Court, who played for the school in 2015 and 2016.
