= Interference (baseball) =

Illegally changing the course of play

In baseball, interference occurs in situations in which a person illegally changes the course of play from what is expected. Interference might be committed by players on the offense, players not currently in the game, catchers, umpires, or spectators. Each type of interference is covered differently by the rules.

== Offensive interference ==
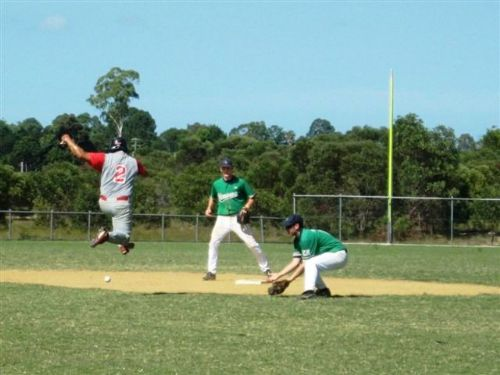
A runner jumping over a ball to avoid an offensive interference

The most common incidence of interference occurs when a member of the offensive team physically hinders the defensive team, decreasing its chances to make an out or increasing the chance that a baserunner will advance. Whenever this offensive interference occurs, the ball becomes dead. If the interference was committed by a batter or a baserunner, that player is called out and all other runners must return to the bases they occupied at the time of the interference. If interference is committed by a runner with the obvious intent of preventing a double play, the batter-runner will be called out in addition to the runner who committed the interference. If interference is committed by the batter-runner before reaching first base with the possible intent of preventing a double play, the runner closest to scoring is called out in addition to the batter-runner. If interference is committed by a retired runner or by some other member of the offensive team, the runner who is most likely to have been put out will be called out.

Under high school (NFHS) and college (NCAA) rules, if interference is committed by a runner with the effect of preventing a likely double play, regardless of intent, the batter-runner will be called out in addition to the runner who committed the interference.

Also under NFHS rules only, all runners are required to attempt to avoid collisions. If a runner fails to do so, the runner is guilty of malicious contact, which is one kind of offensive interference. Malicious contact carries the additional penalty of ejection from the game. In contrast, in professional and higher amateur baseball, violent collisions can occur without any interference (or obstruction), especially when a fielder is receiving a thrown ball near a base where a runner is trying to reach. Any collision that occurs in this situation is not interference, because the fielder's action is in regard to a thrown ball. As long as such a runner's actions are related to their attempt to reach the base, the runner cannot be called for interference. The most common case of this is when a runner is attempting to score and the catcher has control of the ball. If the catcher is in the path between third base and home plate, the baserunner may strike the catcher with their body in an attempt to dislodge the ball from the catcher's hand and then reach home plate. This is usually attempted only when the play is close. When the catcher is set up and ready, the runner has little chance of knocking the ball away. Any such attempt presents a significant chance of injury to the baserunner, which has prompted the malicious contact rule to be used more often. In addition to the general subjective definition of offensive interference, it is also interference by specific rule when:

- The bat hits the ball a second time in fair territory, such as while the bat is being dropped;
- A batter or runner intentionally deflects the course of a batted ball in any manner;
- A member of the offensive team stands near a base to impersonate a baserunner or to otherwise confuse or hinder the defense;
- A coach physically assists a runner in returning to or leaving first or third base;
- A batter, while running to first base, runs outside the three-foot running lane and interferes with the fielder taking a throw at first base;
- A runner makes contact with a batted ball that did not go through or by a fielder, unless no infielder had a chance to immediately field the ball (in this instance, the runner is out, the batter is credited with a base hit, and no other runner advances unless forced to advance one base);
- A runner makes contact with a fielder attempting to field a batted ball, except the batter with the catcher in the immediate vicinity of home plate immediately after the ball was batted; or
- A member of the offensive team intentionally touches a thrown ball, or intentionally hinders a fielder attempting to make a throw.
- The batter physically hinders the catcher's opportunity to throw out a baserunner while standing outside of the batter's box.

There are some exceptions to the penalty for offensive interference.

- If there are fewer than two outs and a runner is trying to score, and the batter interferes with the tag attempt at home plate, then the runner is out for the batter's interference, while the batter is not out. If there are two outs in this situation, the normal interference penalty applies: the batter is out and the run does not score.
- If a runner's interference is caused by being positioned at a legally occupied base and the fielder is trying to make a play on a batted ball in the vicinity of the base, interference is not called.

=== Verbal interference ===
At some levels of play, verbal as well as physical hindrance can be called for interference. For example, if a runner or other member of the offense calls out "foul" on a fair ball or "mine" on a fly ball, it may cause the defense to react differently from how they otherwise would have, resulting in an interference call. Some professional leagues do not have a distinction for verbal interference or obstruction and leave it as umpire judgement. The NPB in Japan, for example, verbal interference is illegal and runners will be called out on any spoken word meant to confuse a fielder or fielders during a play. In Major League Baseball, it is left as umpire judgement but is typically considered legal.

=== Cases of possible offensive interference ===
On October 15, 1969, in Game 4 of the 1969 World Series between the New York Mets and Baltimore Orioles, Mets pinch hitter J.C. Martin attempted a tenth-inning sacrifice bunt which Orioles pitcher Pete Richert fielded; however, Richert's throw to first base hit Martin on the wrist and the ball ricocheted into right field, allowing Mets baserunner Rod Gaspar to score the winning run from second base. The Orioles protested vehemently, but although replays showed Martin ran inside the first base line, umpires ruled the play valid and no interference was called. The win gave the "Miracle Mets" a 3–1 lead in the series, and they closed out their championship season with a win the next day.

An alleged offensive interference occurred in the third game of the 1975 World Series. With a runner on first, Cincinnati Reds player Ed Armbrister laid down a sacrifice bunt. Red Sox catcher Carlton Fisk attempted to field the ball and throw to second base and get the lead runner out. However, Armbrister did not immediately run to first base but instead stood essentially still in the vicinity of home plate, forcing Fisk to jump into him in order to make the throw. As a result, Fisk's throw went into center field, and the Reds ended up with runners on first and third with no outs. The Red Sox protested, saying that Armbrister interfered, but home plate umpire Larry Barnett refused to change the call. The rules at the time did not mention a batter-runner/catcher collision, but the official interpretation issued to the umpires did; there is no violation on such unintentional contact. The Red Sox lost the game, and the series.

== Umpire's interference ==
It is umpire's interference when the umpire hinders a catcher's attempt to throw anywhere. In this case, if the catcher's direct throw retires a runner the play stands. If not, the ball is dead and all runners must return to the bases they had most recently touched before the catcher's throw.

It is also umpire's interference when an umpire is struck by a fair batted ball before it touches a fielder including the pitcher or passes near an infielder other than the pitcher. This can occur either because an umpire is inside the diamond or because the ball crosses 1st or 3rd base in fair territory then hooks or slices foul into the umpire positioned just outside the line behind the bag. In this case, the ball is dead, the batter is awarded first base, and all other runners advance only if forced. A common example is when a batter hits a fair ball down the first base line so hard that the first base umpire can't avoid it. Even though the hit would have surely been a bases-clearing double or triple without the interference, it is only a single and runners advance no more than one base. This happened in the 1989 All-Star Game when the Pittsburgh Pirates' Bobby Bonilla led off the 9th with a scorching grounder that would have been an easy double, but it hit first base umpire Bob Engel in the legs as he tried to jump out of the way. Instead of being in scoring position down 5–3, Bonilla was forced out at 2nd the next play and the game ended on a double play.

== Catcher's interference ==
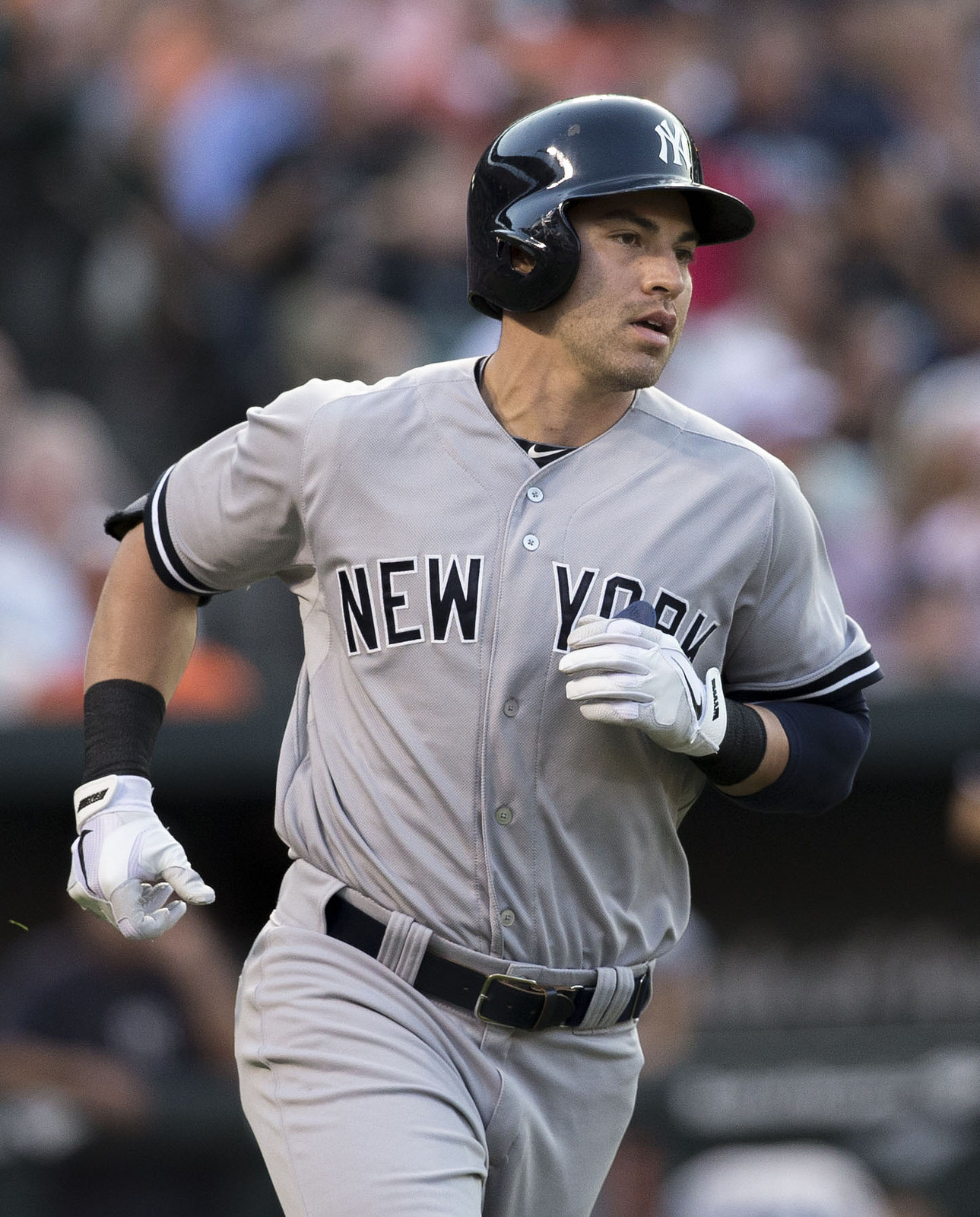
Jacoby Ellsbury, the all-time leader in times being interfered with by a catcher.

Catcher's interference is called when the catcher physically hinders the batter's legal swing at a pitched ball. This usually occurs when a catcher squats too close to home plate, so that the batter's bat hits the catcher's mitt as the batter swings. This is most likely to happen on attempted steals where the catcher is anxious to catch the ball as soon as possible and may move their entire body or mitt forward a bit. It also more commonly happens to hitters who let pitches get deeper and take later swings, such as Jacoby Ellsbury, who holds the record for the most times interfered with by a catcher in both a single season and his career.

In this case, play continues until the play ends and the umpire calls time. The penalty is that the batter is awarded first base, any runner attempting to steal is awarded that base, and all other runners advance only if forced. Additionally, the catcher is charged with an error and the batter is not charged with an at-bat. However, if the playing result is more advantageous than the penalty, the offense may elect to ignore the infraction (e.g., if the batter-runner reaches first safely and all other runners advance at least one base, catcher's interference is ignored by rule, or if a run scores even though the play resulted in an out the offense may elect to take the play versus the penalty by appealing to the calling umpire).

Under National Federation of State High School Associations rules, catcher's interference is instead called catcher's obstruction.

== Spectator interference ==
When a spectator or other person not associated with one of the teams (including such staff as bat and ball boys/girls) alters play in progress, it is spectator interference, colloquially called fan interference. The latter is also (incorrectly) used to refer to fan obstruction – for instance a spectator running onto the field and tackling a baserunner. The ball becomes dead, and the umpire will award any bases or charge any outs that, in their judgment, would have occurred without the interference.

Such interference often occurs when a spectator in the first row of seats reaches onto the field to attempt to grab a fair or foul fly ball. If the umpire judges that the fielder could have caught the ball over the field (i.e., the ball would have not crossed over the plane of the wall), they will rule the batter out on spectator interference. Spectators who commit interference are typically ejected from the stadium.

However, spectators are allowed to touch and/or catch a ball that is still in play once the ball has broken the plane of the spectators' side of the wall. Spectators may even use a certain level of non-violent force (for example, they may attempt to dislodge a ball out of a defender's glove) provided they do not themselves cross the plane in their efforts. The area where both fielders and spectators are legally allowed to touch the ball is colloquially called no man's land.

Umpires typically grab their wrist above their head to signal that spectator interference has occurred.

=== Cases of possible spectator interference ===
- On October 9, 1996, the eighth inning of Game 1 of the American League Championship Series (ALCS), with the Yankees trailing 4–3, Derek Jeter, the Yankee shortstop, hit a fly to the right field wall. Oriole right fielder Tony Tarasco backtracked and positioned himself to catch Jeter's fly ball just short of the wall. Jeffrey Maier, a 12-year-old spectator seated in the bleachers, reached out to catch the ball, and deflected it away from Tarasco and over the fence. Umpire Rich Garcia ruled the play a home run rather than calling Jeter out on spectator interference or awarding him a double. Garcia later said he believed the ball was uncatchable, but video of the play shows the ball was touched in the field of play, although Garcia may not have been in position to see the interference. Maier's interference and Garcia's call resulted in a game-tying home run for Jeter. The Yankees won the game in extra innings and prevailed in the series in five games.
- On July 6, 2010, the Seattle Mariners trailed the visiting Kansas City Royals 3–2 in the 8th inning of a game. With runner Ichiro Suzuki on first base for the Mariners, Mariners designated hitter Russell Branyan hit a double down the right field line. As Royals outfielder David DeJesus attempted to make a play on the ball, a young fan reached onto the field and picked up the ball. The play was ruled an automatic double, and the umpires ruled that Branyan would take second base and that Ichiro would take third base, denying him a potential opportunity to score on the play. Both Ichiro and Branyan would be stranded on the bases, and the Royals held on for the 3–2 victory.
- On October 19, 2010, in the second inning of Game 4 of the ALCS, Yankees batter Robinson Canó hit a fly to the right field wall. Rangers right fielder Nelson Cruz backtracked and positioned himself to jump in the air and attempt to catch Cano's fly ball at the wall. A 20-year-old fan in the bleachers reached out to catch the ball and made contact with Cruz's glove, ending his upward momentum and ensuring that Cruz would not catch the ball, which reached the seats. Right field umpire Jim Reynolds ruled the play a home run rather than calling for an instant replay review to determine whether spectator interference had occurred as specified by MLB's new rule regarding instant replay. The potential interference and umpire's call resulted in a solo home run for Cano, and the Yankees taking a 1–0 lead at the time.
- On September 4, 2011, Hunter Pence of the Philadelphia Phillies hit a fly ball to deep right field. Originally ruled a live ball, instant replay showed Marlins right fielder Bryan Petersen was interfered with by multiple fans during his opportunity to catch a ball. After instant replay review, first base umpire and crew chief Joe West ruled Pence out under the provisions of spectator interference and sent Phillies baserunner Ryan Howard back to first base. Phillies manager Charlie Manuel was ejected and elected to play the game under protest. On September 7, MLB vice president of baseball operations Joe Torre denied the first-ever protest associated with authorized instant replay usage.
- On June 8, 2014, Brian Roberts of the Yankees was at bat against the Royals at Kauffman Stadium in the top of the fourth inning. He hit a ball down the first base line that the first base umpire ruled fair. Thinking it was a foul ball, a ball person in foul territory in right field picked the ball up and gave it to a fan. The play was ruled dead and Roberts was awarded a double.
- On August 17, 2018, during a game between the San Diego Padres and Arizona Diamondbacks, Padres batter Eric Hosmer hit a fly ball to deep left center. Diamondbacks outfielder Jon Jay moved to the wall in an attempt to catch it, but a fan seated in the front row reached over the wall with his cup of beer. The ball struck the cup and bounced over the wall into the outfield seats; the play was initially ruled a home run, then reviewed at the Diamondbacks' request. Fan interference was not called, and the home run stood.
- On October 17, 2018, during Game 4 of the ALCS, Houston Astros batter Jose Altuve hit a potential two-run homer in the bottom of the first inning. Although the ball went into the stands in Minute Maid Park despite Boston Red Sox right fielder Mookie Betts' leaping attempt to catch it at the wall, Altuve was ruled out due to fan interference, and the call stood after being reviewed on video. Boston ultimately won the game 8–6 and would go on to win both the ALCS and the World Series.
- On October 29, 2024, during Game 4 of the World Series, Yankees batter Gleyber Torres hit a fly ball down the right field line, which was caught in foul territory up against the wall by Betts, now with the Los Angeles Dodgers. John Hansen and Austin Capobianco, two Yankee fans sitting in the front row, then grabbed Betts's arm and pulled the ball out of his glove in an attempt to break up the catch. Fan interference was called, Torres was ruled out, and both fans were subsequently banned by MLB from attending games.

== Common misconceptions ==
When a fielder hinders a baserunner, the situation is called obstruction, not interference. Baseball commentators often mistakenly refer to obstruction as interference.

Not all physical contact in baseball is interference. Accidental contact that has little or no effect on play is usually ignored; physical contact must result in an advantageous situation for the offense to be considered offensive interference. Nor must physical contact occur for interference to be called; a runner may interfere with a fielder simply by hindering the fielder's ability to attempt to make a play on a batted ball.

If a baserunner is hit by a fair batted ball while standing on a base, the runner is out, unless the ball has already passed an infielder or the infield fly rule has been declared. The base is not a sanctuary. However, being in contact with a base may protect a baserunner from being called out for interference in the case of a fielder attempting to field a batted ball.

Per MLB rules:

If [a] runner has contact with a legally occupied base when he hinders [a fielder who is attempting to make a play on a batted ball], he shall not be called out unless, in the umpire’s judgment, such hindrance, whether it occurs on fair or foul territory, is intentional. If the umpire declares the hindrance intentional, the following penalty shall apply: With less than two out, the umpire shall declare both the runner and batter out. With two out, the umpire shall declare the batter out.

Per Little League rules:

7.08—Any runner is out when –

(b) intentionally interferes with a thrown ball; or hinders a fielder attempting to make a play on a batted ball. (NOTE: A runner who is adjudged to have hindered a fielder who is attempting to make a play on a batted ball is out whether it was intentional or not.)
