= 1996 American League Championship Series =

27th edition of Major League Baseball's American League Championship Series

Team (Wins)	Managers	Season
New York Yankees (4)	Joe Torre	92–70 (.568), GA: 4
Baltimore Orioles (1)	Davey Johnson	88–74 (.543), GB: 4
- Dates: October 9–13
- MVP: Bernie Williams (New York)
- Umpires: Larry Barnett, Dale Scott, Mike Reilly, Dan Morrison, Rocky Roe, Rich Garcia

Broadcast
- Television: NBC (United States); MLB International (International)
- TV announcers: Bob Costas, Joe Morgan, and Bob Uecker (NBC); Gary Thorne and Rick Cerone (MLB International)
- Radio: CBS
- Radio announcers: John Rooney and Jeff Torborg
- ALDS: Baltimore Orioles over Cleveland Indians (3–1); New York Yankees over Texas Rangers (3–1)

The 1996 American League Championship Series (ALCS) was a best-of-seven playoff series in Major League Baseball’s 1996 postseason pitting the AL East champion New York Yankees against the wild card Baltimore Orioles for the American League pennant. The Series began on October 10 and ended on October 13. The Yankees held home-field advantage by virtue of winning their division.

This marked the first LCS which included a wild card team, and was also the first LCS that was contested between two teams from the same division.

The Yankees won the series 4–1 and went on to defeat the Atlanta Braves in the 1996 World Series.

== Summary ==
=== New York Yankees vs. Baltimore Orioles ===
New York won the series, 4–1.

Game	Date	Score	Location	Time	Attendance
1	October 9	Baltimore Orioles – 4, New York Yankees – 5 (11)	Yankee Stadium (I)	4:23	56,495
2	October 10	Baltimore Orioles – 5, New York Yankees – 3	Yankee Stadium (I)	4:13	58,432
3	October 11	New York Yankees – 5, Baltimore Orioles – 2	Oriole Park at Camden Yards	2:50	48,635
4	October 12	New York Yankees – 8, Baltimore Orioles – 4	Oriole Park at Camden Yards	3:45	48,974
5	October 13	New York Yankees – 6, Baltimore Orioles – 4	Oriole Park at Camden Yards	2:57	48,718

== Game summaries ==
=== Game 1 ===
October 9, 1996 4:08 pm (EDT) at Yankee Stadium (I) in Bronx, New York 66 °F (19 °C), sunny
Team	1	2	3	4	5	6	7	8	9	10	11	R	H	E
Baltimore	0	1	1	1	0	1	0	0	0	0	0	4	11	1
New York	1	1	0	0	0	0	1	1	0	0	1	5	11	0
WP: Mariano Rivera (1–0) LP: Randy Myers (0–1); Home runs: BAL: Brady Anderson (1), Rafael Palmeiro (1); NYY: Derek Jeter (1), Bernie Williams (1); Attendance: 56,495; Boxscore

The Yankees struck first in Game 1 when Tim Raines doubled to lead off the first off Scott Erickson, moved to third on a groundout, and scored on Bernie Williams's groundout, but the Orioles tied in the second off Andy Pettitte when Rafael Palmeiro drew a leadoff walk, moved to third on a double and scored on Eddie Murray's ground out. The Yankees retook the lead in the second when Cecil Fielder drew a leadoff walk, moved two bases on an error and force out, then scored on Jim Leyritz's groundout, but Brady Anderson's home run in the third tied the game again. Next inning, Palmeiro's home run put the Orioles up 3–2. In the sixth, inning the Orioles loaded the bases on two walks and a single before B.J. Surhoff's sacrifice fly put them up 4–2. In the bottom of the seventh, inning Armando Benitez walked Darryl Strawberry with the bases loaded to cut Baltimore's lead to 4–3. Next inning, the game would become most notable for the infamous "Jeffrey Maier Incident." Rookie Derek Jeter hit a fly ball to deep right field off Benítez. Right fielder Tony Tarasco backed up to the wall, but 12-year-old Yankees fan Jeffrey Maier reached over the fence and brought the ball into the stands and out of the field of play before Tarasco could attempt to catch the ball for a possible out. Tarasco immediately pointed above and protested that it was fan interference, but right field umpire Rich Garcia controversially ruled it a home run and his call was upheld by the other members of the umpiring crew. Baltimore manager Davey Johnson was ejected for arguing the ruling. The game then went into extra innings, where Bernie Williams ended it in the 11th inning with a walk-off home run into the left field seats off Baltimore's Randy Myers.

=== Game 2 ===
October 10, 1996 3:07 pm (EDT) at Yankee Stadium (I) in Bronx, New York 58 °F (14 °C), cloudy
Team	1	2	3	4	5	6	7	8	9	R	H	E
Baltimore	0	0	2	0	0	0	2	1	0	5	10	0
New York	2	0	0	0	0	0	1	0	0	3	11	1
WP: David Wells (1–0) LP: Jeff Nelson (0–1) Sv: Armando Benítez (1); Home runs: BAL: Todd Zeile (1), Rafael Palmeiro (2); NYY: None; Attendance: 58,432; Boxscore

The Yankees struck first in Game 2 on three consecutive leadoff singles in the first off David Wells, the last of which to Bernie Williams scored Derek Jeter and put Tim Raines at third. Raines scored on Cecil Fielder's double play to put the Yankees up 2–0, but the Orioles tied the game on Todd Zeiles' two-run home run in the third after a walk off David Cone. In the seventh, Rafael Palmeiro drove a Jeff Nelson slider high over the right field fence for a two-run home run to put Baltimore up 4–2. Wells allowed two singles in the bottom of the inning and was relieved by Alan Mills, who allowed an RBI single to Fielder to make it 4–3 Orioles, but in the eighth, Brady Anderson and Zeile hit back-to-back one-out singles off Nelson, who was relieved by Graeme Lloyd and Roberto Alomar's sacrifice fly made it 5–3 Orioles. In the ninth, the Yankees put runners on first and second with one out off Randy Myers before Armando Benítez came on to slam the door on the budding rally as the Orioles tied the series 1–1. Cone was wild, walking five batters in six innings of work, while Wells won for the tenth time in 11 career decisions at Yankee Stadium. The Yankees continued a trend that started in Game 1 by stranding 11 men on base, bringing their total to 24 for the series.

=== Game 3 ===
October 11, 1996 8:07 pm (EDT) at Oriole Park at Camden Yards in Baltimore, Maryland 57 °F (14 °C), clear
Team	1	2	3	4	5	6	7	8	9	R	H	E
New York	0	0	0	1	0	0	0	4	0	5	8	0
Baltimore	2	0	0	0	0	0	0	0	0	2	3	2
WP: Jimmy Key (1–0) LP: Mike Mussina (0–1) Sv: John Wetteland (1); Home runs: NYY: Cecil Fielder (1); BAL: Todd Zeile (2); Attendance: 48,635; Boxscore

The Orioles got on the board in the first inning with a Todd Zeile two-run homer, his second of the series. After that, Jimmy Key cruised allowing only one more hit through eight innings. Meanwhile, Mike Mussina pitched well also, allowing just one run in the fourth when Bernie Williams walked with one out, moved to third on a single and scored on Cecil Fielder's groundout, but unraveled with two outs in the top of the eighth inning. Jeter started the rally with a double and scored on Bernie Williams' RBI single to tie the game. Tino Martinez followed by spanking an opposite field double to left. As the relay came in from left field, Todd Zeile caught the ball and then faked a throw towards second. However, the ball slipped out of his hand and straight towards the ground. As the ball trickled away from him and shortstop Cal Ripken Jr. on the infield, Williams, who had been content to stay at third on the double, alertly scampered home to give the Yankees a 3–2 lead. Mussina then served up a hanging curveball to the next batter Cecil Fielder, who blasted it into the left field stands making the score 5–2. John Wetteland earned a save with a perfect ninth to give the Yankees a 2–1 series lead.

=== Game 4 ===
October 12, 1996 7:37 pm (EDT) at Oriole Park at Camden Yards in Baltimore, Maryland 65 °F (18 °C), clear
Team	1	2	3	4	5	6	7	8	9	R	H	E
New York	2	1	0	2	0	0	0	3	0	8	9	0
Baltimore	1	0	1	2	0	0	0	0	0	4	11	0
WP: David Weathers (1–0) LP: Rocky Coppinger (0–1); Home runs: NYY: Bernie Williams (2), Darryl Strawberry 2 (2), Paul O'Neill (1); BAL: Chris Hoiles (1); Attendance: 48,974; Boxscore

The Yankees struck first on Bernie Williams's two-run home run in the top of the first off Rocky Coppinger. The Orioles cut the lead to 2–1 in the bottom of the inning on Rafael Palmeiro's sacrifice fly with runners on first and third off Kenny Rogers. Darryl Strawberry's leadoff home run next inning made it 3–1 Yankees, but Chris Hoiles's leadoff home run in the third again cut their lead to one. Paul O'Neill's two-run home in the fourth extended the Yankees' lead to 5–2, but in the bottom of the inning, Rogers allowed a walk and single to put runners on first and third with no outs for the Orioles. David Weathers in relief allowed an RBI single to B.J. Surhoff and groundout to Hoiles that again cut the Yankees' lead to one. Weathers and three relieved held Baltimore scoreless for the rest of the game while the Yankees padded their lead in the eighth. Williams hit a one-out double off Alan Mills, who was relieved by Jesse Orosco. After Tino Martinez singled, Armando Benitez relieved Orosco and allowed an RBI groundout to Cecil Fielder before Strawberry's second home run of the game made it 8–4 Yankees. The Orioles in the bottom of the inning hit three straight leadoff singles to load the bases with no outs off Mariano Rivera, who struck out Hoiles and Brady Anderson, then got Todd Zeile to pop up to short to end the inning. John Wetteland retired the Orioles in order in the ninth to give the Yankees a 3–1 series lead.

=== Game 5 ===
October 13, 1996 4:07 pm (EDT) at Oriole Park at Camden Yards in Baltimore, Maryland 77 °F (25 °C), sunny
Team	1	2	3	4	5	6	7	8	9	R	H	E
New York	0	0	6	0	0	0	0	0	0	6	11	0
Baltimore	0	0	0	0	0	1	0	1	2	4	4	1
WP: Andy Pettitte (1–0) LP: Scott Erickson (0–1); Home runs: NYY: Jim Leyritz (1), Cecil Fielder (2), Darryl Strawberry (3); BAL: Todd Zeile (3), Eddie Murray (1), Bobby Bonilla (1); Attendance: 48,718; Boxscore

The Yankees clinched the series with a six-run third off Scott Erickson. Jim Leyritz led off the inning with a home run, then Derek Jeter and Wade Boggs hit consecutive one-out singles. Second baseman Roberto Alomar's error on Bernie Williams's ground ball let Jeter score and put runners on first and third. After Tino Martinez hit into a fielder's choice at home, Cecil Fielder's three-run home run put the Yankees up 5–0. Darryl Strawberry's home run then made it 6–0. Though Erickson and three relievers held the Yankees scoreless for the rest of the game, Andy Pettitte pitched 5 2/3 shutout innings before Todd Zeile's home run in the sixth put the Orioles on the board. Eddie Murray's leadoff home run in the eighth made it 6–2 Yankees. In the ninth, John Wetteland relieved Pettitte and allowed a two-out two-run home run to Bobby Bonilla before Cal Ripken Jr. grounded out to end the series and send the Yankees to the World Series for the first time since 1981.

== Composite box ==
1996 ALCS (4–1): New York Yankees over Baltimore Orioles

Team	1	2	3	4	5	6	7	8	9	10	11	R	H	E
New York Yankees	5	2	6	3	0	0	2	8	0	0	1	27	50	1
Baltimore Orioles	3	1	4	3	0	2	2	2	2	0	0	19	39	4
Total attendance: 261,254 Average attendance: 52,251

== Aftermath ==
Jeffrey Maier became a mini-celebrity due to his role in the interference of Derek Jeter’s controversial home run during Game 1. The New York Daily News allowed him to sit behind the Yankee dugout later in the postseason and he appeared on national talk shows throughout October 1996. Maier played college baseball at Wesleyan University in Middletown, Connecticut and was available to be drafted in the 2006 MLB draft, but he was not selected by any team. In the 2026 American League Division Series, a similar play occurred when Yankees' utility man Anthony Volpe game-tying home run was overturned into just a run-scoring double due to fan interference. By 2026, plays on such situations were now reviewable by replay.

The Yankees would go on to win four out of the next five World Series, as well as two more pennants in 2001 and 2003. Meanwhile, the Orioles returned to the ALCS the following year, but were defeated by the Cleveland Indians. They were the first team to lose back-to-back League Championship Series since the ill-fated 1990–1992 Pittsburgh Pirates lost three straight.

The Orioles and Yankees have been division rivals since there has been an American League East, but the rivalry peaked from 1996 to 1998, and was highlighted by a benches-clearing brawl on May 19, 1998. The fight started when Orioles’ closer Armando Benitez threw a fastball near Tino Martinez’s shoulder after Benitez allowed a three-run homer to Yankees star Bernie Williams. Yankee reliever Graeme Lloyd sprinted in from the home bullpen toward Benitez. Eventually the fight rolled toward the Orioles' dugout with designated hitter Darryl Strawberry throwing a sucker punch at Benitez. The force of Strawberry's swing carried him into the Orioles' dugout, with players from both teams following. Alan Mills led the way, and pounded Strawberry in the face multiple times. Strawberry emerged with a bloodied mouth and a sore left hand after being restrained by Orioles bench coach and his former teammate Eddie Murray, third baseman Cal Ripken and Yankees manager Joe Torre.

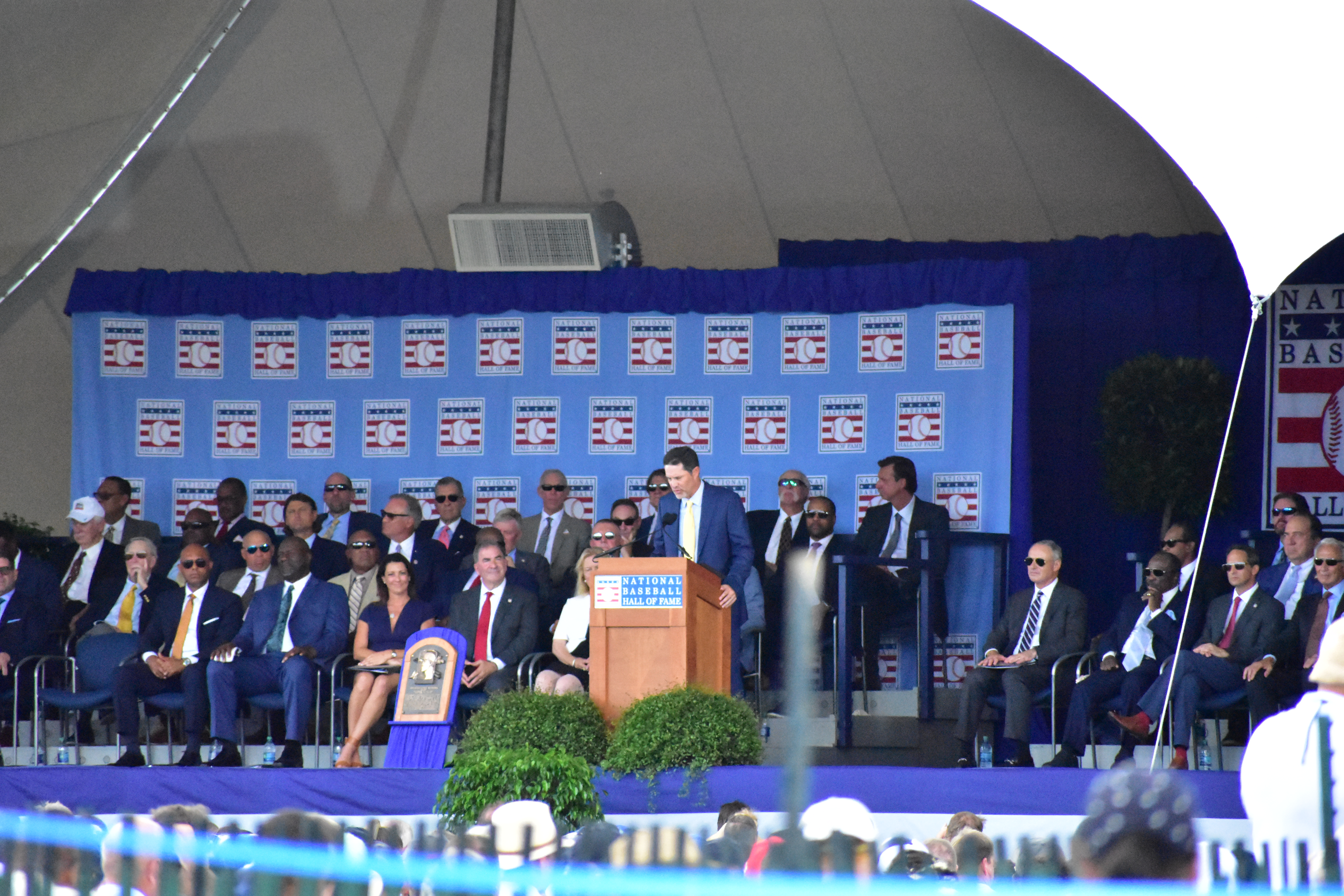
Mike Mussina, an Oriole for 10 years and Yankee for 8, choose to go into the Hall of Fame with no team logo on his bust,

Longtime Orioles staff ace Mike Mussina signed a six-year, $88.5 million contract with the New York on November 30, 2000. After their 1997 ALCS defeat, Baltimore had finished with losing records in three straight seasons, finishing fourth each year. Mussina's last contract talks with the Orioles were in August, but as he got closer to free agency, his desire was to pitch for a winning team. After losing Mussina, the Orioles went into a long re-build and did not make the postseason again until 2012. Mussina continued to pitch well while with the Yankees, but was unlucky in that he arrived the year after a Yankees World Series (2000) and retired a year before their next one (2009). On January 22, 2019, Mussina was elected to the National Baseball Hall of Fame, receiving 76.71% of the vote. He chose not to have a logo on his bust, saying, "I don't feel like I can pick one team over the other because they were both great to me. I did a lot in Baltimore and they gave me the chance and then in New York we went to the playoffs seven of eight years, and both teams were involved. To go in with no logo was the only decision I felt good about".

In the 2012 American League Division Series, the Yankees once again defeated the Orioles, winning the series in five games.
