= Onix Concepción =

Puerto Rican baseball player (born 1957)

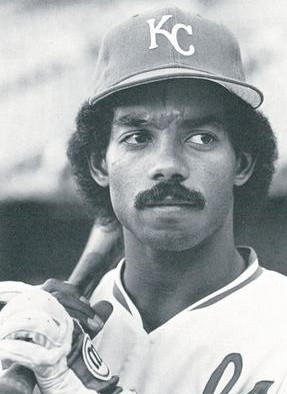
- Shortstop
- Born: October 5, 1957 (age 68); Dorado, Puerto Rico
- Batted: Right Threw: Right

MLB debut
- August 30, 1980, for the Kansas City Royals

Last MLB appearance
- April 7, 1987, for the Pittsburgh Pirates

MLB statistics
- Batting average: .239
- Home runs: 3
- Runs batted in: 80
- Stats at Baseball Reference

Teams
- Kansas City Royals (1980–1985); Pittsburgh Pirates (1987)

Career highlights and awards
- World Series champion (1985)

Onix Cardona Concepción Cardona (born October 5, 1957) is a Puerto Rican former Major League Baseball (MLB) shortstop. He is the cousin of former MLB player José Lind.

== Career ==
Concepcion played for two teams during his seven-year career: the Kansas City Royals (1980–1985) and Pittsburgh Pirates (1987). Concepcion made his major league debut on August 30, 1980, and played his final game on April 7, 1987.

Concepcion was a member of the Royals team that won the World Series in 1985. He scored the game-tying run in the bottom of the ninth inning of Game 6 on a single by Dane Iorg, which also drove in Jim Sundberg to win the game.

== See also ==
- List of Major League Baseball players from Puerto Rico
