= 1992 Philadelphia Phillies season =

Major League Baseball season

1992 Philadelphia Phillies
- League: National League
- Division: East
- Ballpark: Veterans Stadium
- City: Philadelphia
- Record: 70–92 (.432)
- Divisional place: 6th
- Owners: Bill Giles
- General managers: Lee Thomas
- Managers: Jim Fregosi
- Television: WTXF-TV; PRISM
- Radio: WOGL (Harry Kalas, Richie Ashburn, Andy Musser, Chris Wheeler, Garry Maddox, Kent Tekulve)

The 1992 Philadelphia Phillies season was a season in Major League Baseball. The Phillies finished sixth in the National League East with a record of 70 wins and 92 losses.

== Offseason ==
- December 8, 1991: Von Hayes was traded by the Phillies to the California Angels for Rubén Amaro, Jr. and Kyle Abbott.
- December 9, 1991: Danny Cox was signed as a free agent by the Phillies.
- December 10, 1991: Mariano Duncan was signed as a free agent by the Phillies.
- December 11, 1991: Bruce Ruffin was traded by the Phillies to the Milwaukee Brewers for Dale Sveum.
- January 8, 1992: The Phillies traded a player to be named later to the New York Yankees for Darrin Chapin. The Phillies completed the deal by sending Charlie Hayes to the Yankees on February 19.
- January 8, 1992: Rick Schu was signed as a free agent by the Phillies.

== Regular season ==
On September 20, Mickey Morandini executed an unassisted triple play in the sixth inning. He caught a line drive, touched second base and tagged the runner coming from first base.

=== Notable transactions ===
- April 2, 1992: Jason Grimsley was traded by the Phillies to the Houston Astros for Curt Schilling.
- April 5, 1992: Steve Lake was signed as a free agent by the Phillies.
- June 1, 1992: Bobby Estalella was drafted by the Phillies in the 23rd round of the 1992 Major League Baseball draft. Player signed May 9, 1993.
- June 7, 1992: Danny Cox was released by the Phillies.
- August 10, 1992: Dale Sveum was traded by the Phillies to the Chicago White Sox for Keith Shepherd.
- August 11, 1992: Steve Scarsone was traded by the Phillies to the Baltimore Orioles for Juan Bell.

=== Season standings ===
NL East
Team	W	L	Pct.	GB	Home	Road
Pittsburgh Pirates	96	66	.593	—	53‍–‍28	43‍–‍38
Montreal Expos	87	75	.537	9	43‍–‍38	44‍–‍37
St. Louis Cardinals	83	79	.512	13	45‍–‍36	38‍–‍43
Chicago Cubs	78	84	.481	18	43‍–‍38	35‍–‍46
New York Mets	72	90	.444	24	41‍–‍40	31‍–‍50
Philadelphia Phillies	70	92	.432	26	41‍–‍40	29‍–‍52

=== Record vs. opponents ===
1992 National League record Sources:
Team	ATL	CHC	CIN	HOU	LAD	MON	NYM	PHI	PIT	SD	SF	STL
Atlanta	—	10–2	9–9	13–5	12–6	4–8	7–5	6–6	7–5	13–5	11–7	6–6
Chicago	2–10	—	5–7	8–4	6–6	7–11	9–9	9–9	8–10	5–7	8–4	11–7
Cincinnati	9–9	7–5	—	10–8	11–7	5–7	7–5	7–5	6–6	11–7	10–8	7–5
Houston	5–13	4–8	8–10	—	13–5	8–4	5–7	8–4	6–6	7–11	12–6	5–7
Los Angeles	6–12	6–6	7–11	5–13	—	4–8	5–7	5–7	5–7	9–9	7–11	4–8
Montreal	8–4	11–7	7–5	4–8	8–4	—	12–6	9–9	9–9	8–4	5–7	6–12
New York	5–7	9–9	5–7	7–5	7–5	6–12	—	6–12	4–14	4–8	10–2	9–9
Philadelphia	6-6	9–9	5–7	4–8	7–5	9–9	12–6	—	5–13	3–9	3–9	7–11
Pittsburgh	5–7	10–8	6–6	6–6	7–5	9–9	14–4	13–5	—	5–7	6–6	15–3
San Diego	5–13	7–5	7–11	11–7	9–9	4–8	8–4	9–3	7–5	—	11–7	4–8
San Francisco	7–11	4–8	8–10	6–12	11–7	7–5	2–10	9–3	6–6	7–11	—	5–7
St. Louis	6–6	7–11	5–7	7–5	8–4	12–6	9–9	11–7	3–15	8–4	7–5	—

=== 1992 Game Log ===
Legend
	Phillies win
	Phillies loss
	Postponement
**Bold**	Phillies team member

1992 Game Log
Overall Record: 70–92
April (10–12)

#	Date	Opponent	Score	Win	Loss	Save	Attendance	Record
1	April 7	Cubs	3–4	Greg Maddux (1–0)	**Terry Mulholland** (0–1)	Chuck McElroy (1)	60,431	0–1
2	April 8	Cubs	11–3	**Tommy Greene** (1–0)	Danny Jackson (0–1)	None	16,328	1–1
3	April 9	Cubs	7–1	**Danny Cox** (1–0)	Mike Morgan (0–1)	None	14,149	2–1
4	April 10	Pirates	2–3	Randy Tomlin (1–0)	**Kyle Abbott** (0–1)	Stan Belinda (2)	21,019	2–2
5	April 11	Pirates	7–4	**Andy Ashby** (1–0)	Doug Drabek (1–1)	None	24,967	3–2
6	April 12	Pirates	1–6	Zane Smith (2–0)	**Terry Mulholland** (0–2)	None	32,624	3–3
7	April 13	@ Mets	3–2	**Curt Schilling** (1–0)	Sid Fernandez (0–2)	**Mitch Williams** (1)	14,810	4–3
8	April 14	@ Mets	5–8	John Franco (1–0)	**Cliff Brantley** (0–1)	None	15,274	4–4
9	April 15	@ Mets	2–7	Dwight Gooden (1–1)	**Kyle Abbott** (0–2)	None	17,448	4–5
10	April 17	@ Pirates	4–7	Doug Drabek (2–1)	**Barry Jones** (0–1)	Stan Belinda (3)	16,417	4–6
11	April 18	@ Pirates	2–9	Zane Smith (3–0)	**Tommy Greene** (1–1)	None	23,411	4–7
12	April 19	@ Pirates	0–11	Bob Patterson (1–0)	**Danny Cox** (1–1)	None	11,812	4–8
13	April 20	@ Cubs	3–8	Greg Maddux (3–0)	**Kyle Abbott** (0–3)	None	23,515	4–9
14	April 21	@ Cubs	7–5 (10)	**Mitch Williams** (1–0)	Heathcliff Slocumb (0–1)	**Curt Schilling** (1)	8,886	5–9
15	April 22	@ Cubs	5–9	Shawn Boskie (3–0)	**Terry Mulholland** (0–3)	None	8,167	5–10
16	April 23	@ Cubs	8–2	**Tommy Greene** (2–1)	Frank Castillo (0–1)	None	9,086	6–10
17	April 24	Mets	4–3	**Mitch Williams** (2–0)	Wally Whitehurst (0–1)	None	25,482	7–10
18	April 25	Mets	2–3	Sid Fernandez (1–2)	**Kyle Abbott** (0–4)	John Franco (3)	29,374	7–11
19	April 26	Mets	5–4	**Barry Jones** (1–1)	Wally Whitehurst (0–2)	**Mitch Williams** (2)	44,194	8–11
20	April 27	@ Padres	12–9	**Curt Schilling** (2–0)	Bruce Hurst (1–2)	**Mitch Williams** (3)	11,998	9–11
21	April 28	@ Padres	6–7	Pat Clements (1–0)	**Curt Schilling** (2–1)	None	10,181	9–12
22	April 29	@ Dodgers	7–3	**Danny Cox** (2–1)	Orel Hershiser (2–2)	None	36,639	10–12
–	April 30	@ Dodgers	Postponed (Rodney King riots); Makeup: July 3 as a traditional double-header					

May (12–13)

#	Date	Opponent	Score	Win	Loss	Save	Attendance	Record
–	May 1	@ Giants	Postponed (Rodney King riots); Makeup: July 7 as a traditional double-header					
23	May 2	@ Giants	1–2	Bill Swift (5–0)	**Kyle Abbott** (0–5)	Dave Righetti (1)	12,157	10–13
24	May 3	@ Giants	12–3	**Cliff Brantley** (1–1)	Trevor Wilson (1–2)	**Curt Schilling** (2)	27,515	11–13
25	May 5	Dodgers	6–2	**Terry Mulholland** (1–3)	Tom Candiotti (3–1)	None	15,654	12–13
26	May 6	Dodgers	1–3	Ramón Martínez (1–1)	**Danny Cox** (2–2)	Roger McDowell (3)	21,679	12–14
27	May 8	Padres	5–6	José Meléndez (4–0)	**Curt Schilling** (2–2)	Randy Myers (7)	8,798	12–15
28	May 9	Padres	1–5	Craig Lefferts (3–2)	**Cliff Brantley** (1–2)	Randy Myers (8)	23,070	12–16
29	May 10	Padres	9–3	**Terry Mulholland** (2–3)	Greg W. Harris (1–3)	None		13–16
30	May 11	Giants	7–8 (10)	Dave Burba (2–3)	**Mitch Williams** (2–1)	None	15,905	13–17
31	May 12	Giants	5–7	Bryan Hickerson (2–1)	**Barry Jones** (1–2)	Mike Jackson (1)	16,247	13–18
32	May 13	Giants	3–5	Trevor Wilson (3–2)	**Kyle Abbott** (0–6)	Jeff Brantley (3)	21,211	13–19
33	May 15	@ Reds	8–0	**Terry Mulholland** (3–3)	Tom Browning (3–3)	None	32,819	14–19
34	May 16	@ Reds	5–6	Tim Belcher (3–4)	**Wally Ritchie** (0–1)	Rob Dibble (5)	42,382	14–20
35	May 17	@ Reds	5–4	**Mike Hartley** (1–0)	Rob Dibble (0–1)	**Mitch Williams** (4)	29,783	15–20
36	May 18	Astros	2–4	Jimmy Jones (1–0)	**Kyle Abbott** (0–7)	Joe Boever (1)	17,309	15–21
37	May 19	Astros	4–3	**Curt Schilling** (3–2)	Butch Henry (0–4)	**Mitch Williams** (5)	15,299	16–21
38	May 20	Astros	2–1	**Terry Mulholland** (4–3)	Darryl Kile (2–5)	**Mitch Williams** (6)	16,048	17–21
–	May 21	Reds	Postponed (rain); Makeup: August 18 as a traditional double-header					
39	May 22	Reds	8–2	**Cliff Brantley** (2–2)	Tim Belcher (3–5)	None	22,028	18–21
40	May 23	Reds	0–10	Greg Swindell (4–2)	**Brad Brink** (0–1)	None	26,332	18–22
41	May 24	Reds	3–8	José Rijo (1–3)	**Curt Schilling** (3–3)	None	30,954	18–23
42	May 25	Braves	4–1	**Terry Mulholland** (5–3)	Steve Avery (2–5)	**Mitch Williams** (7)	18,343	19–23
43	May 26	Braves	5–2	**Don Robinson** (2–0)	Mike Bielecki (1–3)	**Mitch Williams** (8)	11,295	20–23
44	May 27	Braves	3–9	Tom Glavine (7–3)	**Cliff Brantley** (2–3)	None	23,695	20–24
45	May 29	@ Astros	2–1 (12)	**Barry Jones** (2–2)	Al Osuna (3–3)	None	10,815	21–24
46	May 30	@ Astros	4–5	Jimmy Jones (2–0)	**Terry Mulholland** (5–4)	Doug Jones (12)	16,046	21–25
47	May 31	@ Astros	6–3 (11)	**Barry Jones** (3–2)	Rob Murphy (0–1)	**Wally Ritchie** (1)	14,846	22–25

June (12–15)

#	Date	Opponent	Score	Win	Loss	Save	Attendance	Record
48	June 1	@ Braves	6–7	Tom Glavine (8–3)	**Cliff Brantley** (2–4)	Mark Wohlers (1)	25,647	22–26
49	June 2	@ Braves	3–5	Mike Stanton (1–2)	**Mitch Williams** (2–2)	None	27,855	22–27
50	June 3	@ Braves	4–1	**Curt Schilling** (4–3)	John Smoltz (5–5)	**Mitch Williams** (9)	19,357	23–27
51	June 5	Cardinals	7–5	**Barry Jones** (4–2)	Todd Worrell (2–2)	**Mitch Williams** (10)	12,128	24–27
52	June 6	Cardinals	7–5	**Mike Hartley** (2–0)	Bob McClure (1–1)	**Mitch Williams** (11)	28,257	25–27
53	June 7	Cardinals	4–5	Todd Worrell (3–2)	**Bob Ayrault** (0–1)	Lee Smith (15)	24,512	25–28
54	June 8	Pirates	7–0	**Curt Schilling** (5–3)	Vicente Palacios (3–1)	None	21,040	26–28
55	June 9	Pirates	3–5	Doug Drabek (5–4)	**Mike Hartley** (2–1)	Denny Neagle (1)	29,138	26–29
56	June 10	Pirates	1–2 (12)	Bob Patterson (3–0)	**Barry Jones** (4–3)	Roger Mason (6)	25,112	26–30
57	June 12	@ Cardinals	8–5	**Wally Ritchie** (1–1)	Donovan Osborne (5–3)	**Mitch Williams** (12)	35,719	27–30
58	June 13	@ Cardinals	1–4	Omar Olivares (3–3)	**Curt Schilling** (5–4)	Lee Smith (16)	39,477	27–31
59	June 14	@ Cardinals	2–5	Rhéal Cormier (1–5)	**Brad Brink** (0–2)	Lee Smith (17)	40,949	27–32
60	June 15	@ Pirates	4–1	**Terry Mulholland** (6–4)	Zane Smith (5–5)	None	23,581	28–32
61	June 16	@ Pirates	5–6 (12)	Bob Patterson (4–0)	**Cliff Brantley** (2–5)	None	18,548	28–33
62	June 17	@ Pirates	2–8	Randy Tomlin (9–3)	**Don Robinson** (2–1)	None	24,854	28–34
63	June 18	Cubs	4–3	**Mike Hartley** (3–1)	Bob Scanlan (2–4)	**Mitch Williams** (13)	32,860	29–34
64	June 19	Cubs	2–5	Danny Jackson (3–7)	**Brad Brink** (0–3)	Jim Bullinger (6)	20,732	29–35
65	June 20	Cubs	4–1	**Terry Mulholland** (7–4)	Greg Maddux (7–7)	**Mitch Williams** (14)	35,261	30–35
66	June 21	Cubs	2–5	Mike Morgan (6–2)	**Kyle Abbott** (0–8)	Paul Assenmacher (3)	53,872	30–36
67	June 22	@ Expos	5–3	**Pat Combs** (1–0)	Brian Barnes (0–1)	**Mitch Williams** (15)	15,157	31–36
68	June 23	@ Expos	5–0	**Curt Schilling** (6–4)	Chris Nabholz (5–6)	None	30,313	32–36
69	June 24	@ Expos	1–8	Ken Hill (7–4)	**Mickey Weston** (0–1)	None	17,422	32–37
70	June 26	@ Cubs	0–3	Mike Morgan (7–2)	**Kyle Abbott** (0–9)	Jim Bullinger (7)	32,896	32–38
71	June 27	@ Cubs	5–4	**Mike Hartley** (4–1)	Chuck McElroy (3–4)	**Mitch Williams** (16)	35,309	33–38
72	June 28	@ Cubs	3–5	Frank Castillo (6–6)	**Curt Schilling** (6–5)	Paul Assenmacher (4)	32,418	33–39
73	June 29	Expos	5–4	**Terry Mulholland** (8–4)	Jeff Fassero (3–4)	**Mitch Williams** (17)	27,426	34–39
74	June 30	Expos	2–7	Ken Hill (8–4)	**Mike Williams** (0–1)	None	22,282	34–40

July (11–18)

#	Date	Opponent	Score	Win	Loss	Save	Attendance	Record
75	July 1	Expos	3–6	Dennis Martínez (9–6)	**Kyle Abbott** (0–10)	John Wetteland (13)	41,222	34–41
76	July 2	@ Dodgers	4–9	Kevin Gross (4–8)	**Pat Combs** (1–1)	None	46,026	34–42
77	July 3 (1)	@ Dodgers	1–5	Bob Ojeda (5–4)	**Curt Schilling** (6–6)	None	see 2nd game	34–43
78	July 3 (2)	@ Dodgers	0–2	Pedro Astacio (1–0)	**Don Robinson** (2–2)	None	34,713	34–44
79	July 4	@ Dodgers	3–2	**Terry Mulholland** (9–4)	Tom Candiotti (6–7)	None	44,418	35–44
80	July 5	@ Dodgers	9–3	**Mike Williams** (1–1)	Ramón Martínez (4–6)	None	31,024	36–44
81	July 6	@ Giants	2–4	Bud Black (6–2)	**Kyle Abbott** (0–11)	Rod Beck (6)	8,548	36–45
82	July 7 (1)	@ Giants	7–8	Bryan Hickerson (3–1)	**Mike Hartley** (4–2)	Rod Beck (7)	see 2nd game	36–46
83	July 7 (2)	@ Giants	6–10	Jim Pena (1–0)	**Don Robinson** (2–3)	None	13,571	36–47
84	July 8	@ Giants	3–4	Mike Jackson (4–2)	**Mike Hartley** (4–3)	Rod Beck (8)	14,922	36–48
85	July 9	@ Padres	1–3	Jim Deshaies (1–0)	**Terry Mulholland** (9–5)	Randy Myers (14)	17,528	36–49
86	July 10	@ Padres	7–8	Rich Rodriguez (4–2)	**Barry Jones** (4–4)	Randy Myers (15)	35,376	36–50
87	July 11	@ Padres	2–3 (11)	Tim Scott (2–1)	**Mike Hartley** (4–4)	None	11,777	36–51
88	July 12	@ Padres	2–8	Andy Benes (7–7)	**Don Robinson** (2–4)	None	21,803	36–52
–	July 14	**1992 Major League Baseball All-Star Game at Jack Murphy Stadium in San Diego**						
89	July 16	Dodgers	5–7	Tom Candiotti (8–8)	**Terry Mulholland** (9–6)	Jim Gott (4)	34,566	36–53
90	July 17	Dodgers	11–3	**Curt Schilling** (7–6)	Orel Hershiser (7–8)	None	50,606	37–53
91	July 18	Dodgers	14–3	**Kyle Abbott** (1–11)	Ramón Martínez (5–7)	None	33,892	38–53
92	July 19	Dodgers	6–5	**Wally Ritchie** (2–1)	Jay Howell (0–1)	**Mitch Williams** (18)	33,215	39–53
93	July 20	Padres	1–2	Rich Rodriguez (5–2)	**Barry Jones** (4–5)	Randy Myers (16)	20,795	39–54
94	July 21	Padres	3–4	Bruce Hurst (9–6)	**Terry Mulholland** (9–7)	Randy Myers (17)	19,829	39–55
95	July 22	Padres	4–0	**Curt Schilling** (8–6)	Andy Benes (7–9)	None	26,062	40–55
96	July 24	Giants	8–4	**Barry Jones** (5–5)	Mike Jackson (4–3)	**Mitch Williams** (19)	20,580	41–55
97	July 25	Giants	2–6 (10)	Bryan Hickerson (4–1)	**Mitch Williams** (2–3)	None	27,680	41–56
98	July 26	Giants	7–2	**Terry Mulholland** (10–7)	Pat Rapp (0–2)	None	27,370	42–56
99	July 27	Mets	5–0	**Curt Schilling** (9–6)	Bret Saberhagen (3–3)	None	29,138	43–56
100	July 28	Mets	6–8	David Cone (12–4)	**Barry Jones** (5–6)	Anthony Young (7)	32,872	43–57
101	July 29	Mets	6–3	**Mitch Williams** (3–3)	Jeff Innis (5–7)	None	39,691	44–57
102	July 30	@ Expos	2–7	Mark Gardner (10–8)	**Greg Mathews** (0–1)	None	28,106	44–58
103	July 31	@ Expos	2–0	**Terry Mulholland** (11–7)	Brian Barnes (2–3)	None	30,470	45–58

August (8–18)

#	Date	Opponent	Score	Win	Loss	Save	Attendance	Record
104	August 1	@ Expos	4–2	**Curt Schilling** (10–6)	Ken Hill (12–5)	**Mitch Williams** (20)	30,511	46–58
105	August 2	@ Expos	0–1	Chris Nabholz (7–7)	**Ben Rivera** (0–2)	John Wetteland (23)	28,645	46–59
106	August 3	@ Cardinals	1–2	Bob Tewksbury (11–4)	**Kyle Abbott** (1–12)	Lee Smith (25)	25,092	46–60
107	August 4	@ Cardinals	5–9	Bob McClure (2–2)	**Mitch Williams** (3–4)	None	24,357	46–61
108	August 5	@ Cardinals	4–5	Donovan Osborne (8–6)	**Bob Ayrault** (0–2)	Lee Smith (26)	27,396	46–62
109	August 6	Expos	4–7	Ken Hill (13–5)	**Curt Schilling** (10–7)	John Wetteland (26)	18,848	46–63
110	August 7	Expos	3–1	**Ben Rivera** (1–2)	Chris Nabholz (7–8)	**Mitch Williams** (21)	22,673	47–63
111	August 8	Expos	1–6	Dennis Martínez (12–10)	**Kyle Abbott** (1–13)	None	26,338	47–64
112	August 9	Expos	2–6	Mark Gardner (11–8)	**Greg Mathews** (0–2)	Mel Rojas (8)	25,683	47–65
–	August 10	Cardinals	Postponed (rain); Makeup: September 26 as a traditional double-header					
113	August 11	Cardinals	6–7	Todd Worrell (4–3)	**Mitch Williams** (3–5)	Lee Smith (27)	20,825	47–66
114	August 12	Cardinals	2–3 (10)	Todd Worrell (5–3)	**Mitch Williams** (3–6)	Lee Smith (28)	19,807	47–67
115	August 14	@ Mets	6–2	**Ben Rivera** (2–2)	Dwight Gooden (6–10)	None	20,831	48–67
116	August 15	@ Mets	4–3	**Mike Hartley** (5–4)	Jeff Innis (5–8)	**Mitch Williams** (22)	15,901	49–67
–	August 16	@ Mets	Postponed (rain); Makeup: September 28 as a traditional double-header					
117	August 18 (1)	Reds	0–6	Greg Swindell (12–5)	**Terry Mulholland** (11–8)	None	see 2nd game	49–68
118	August 18 (2)	Reds	6–1	**Curt Schilling** (11–7)	José Rijo (9–9)	None	27,202	50–68
119	August 19	Reds	9–3	**Ben Rivera** (3–2)	Chris Hammond (6–8)	None	30,184	51–68
120	August 21	Astros	1–6	Brian Williams (5–4)	**Andy Ashby** (1–1)	None	20,787	51–69
121	August 22	Astros	9–14	Willie Blair (3–6)	**Mike Hartley** (5–5)	None	22,345	51–70
122	August 23	Astros	1–3	Jimmy Jones (7–5)	**Curt Schilling** (11–8)	Doug Jones (28)	27,130	51–71
123	August 24	@ Reds	5–8	Chris Hammond (7–8)	**Ben Rivera** (3–3)	Norm Charlton (25)	22,946	51–72
124	August 25	@ Reds	1–7	Tim Belcher (11–12)	**Greg Mathews** (0–3)	None	21,078	51–73
125	August 26	@ Reds	3–4	Tom Bolton (3–4)	**Andy Ashby** (1–2)	Rob Dibble (17)	23,516	51–74
126	August 28	Braves	7–3	**Terry Mulholland** (12–8)	John Smoltz (14–9)	None	22,267	52–74
127	August 29	Braves	6–7	Charlie Leibrandt (11–5)	**Curt Schilling** (11–9)	Kent Mercker (6)	27,760	52–75
128	August 30	Braves	10–2	**Ben Rivera** (4–3)	Tom Glavine (19–5)	None	32,084	53–75
129	August 31	@ Astros	2–9	Butch Henry (5–9)	**Andy Ashby** (1–3)	None	5,945	53–76

September (16–14)

#	Date	Opponent	Score	Win	Loss	Save	Attendance	Record
130	September 1	@ Astros	3–5	Brian Williams (7–4)	**Cliff Brantley** (2–6)	Doug Jones (29)	6,334	53–77
131	September 2	@ Astros	2–3	Pete Harnisch (6–9)	**Terry Mulholland** (12–9)	Doug Jones (30)	7,828	53–78
132	September 4	@ Braves	2–1	**Curt Schilling** (12–9)	Tom Glavine (19–6)	**Mitch Williams** (23)	40,768	54–78
133	September 5	@ Braves	5–6	Jeff Reardon (3–2)	**Mitch Williams** (3–7)	None	33,755	54–79
134	September 6	@ Braves	3–4	Jeff Reardon (4–2)	**Mike Hartley** (5–6)	None	42,097	54–80
135	September 7	Mets	3–6	Pete Schourek (5–6)	**Terry Mulholland** (12–10)	Anthony Young (13)	14,600	54–81
136	September 8	Mets	2–1	**Keith Shepherd** (1–0)	Dwight Gooden (8–12)	**Mitch Williams** (24)	15,856	55–81
137	September 9	Mets	2–1	**Curt Schilling** (13–9)	Sid Fernandez (12–10)	None	15,525	56–81
138	September 11	Pirates	5–2	**Ben Rivera** (5–3)	Bob Walk (9–5)	**Mitch Williams** (25)	20,168	57–81
139	September 12	Pirates	7–9	Stan Belinda (6–4)	**Mitch Williams** (3–8)	None	22,857	57–82
140	September 13	Pirates	6–3	**Terry Mulholland** (13–10)	Bob Patterson (6–3)	None	35,842	58–82
141	September 14	Expos	6–2	**Tommy Greene** (3–1)	Brian Barnes (6–6)	**Keith Shepherd** (1)	12,130	59–82
142	September 15	Expos	0–3	Ken Hill (16–8)	**Curt Schilling** (13–10)	John Wetteland (34)	13,799	59–83
143	September 16	@ Cubs	9–14	Greg Maddux (18–11)	**Ben Rivera** (5–4)	None	11,985	59–84
144	September 17	@ Cubs	0–3	Mike Morgan (15–7)	**José DeLeón** (2–8)	None	7,743	59–85
145	September 18	@ Pirates	2–5 (6)	Tim Wakefield (6–1)	**Terry Mulholland** (13–11)	None	20,387	59–86
146	September 19	@ Pirates	0–3	Doug Drabek (14–10)	**Tommy Greene** (3–2)	None	25,497	59–87
147	September 20	@ Pirates	2–3 (13)	Roger Mason (5–6)	**Keith Shepherd** (1–1)	None	21,652	59–88
148	September 21	@ Expos	9–2	**Ben Rivera** (6–4)	Chris Nabholz (10–11)	None	11,596	60–88
149	September 22	@ Expos	5–2	**Mike Hartley** (6–6)	Kent Bottenfield (0–2)	**Mitch Williams** (26)	11,196	61–88
150	September 23	Cubs	9–3	**Bob Ayrault** (1–2)	Jim Bullinger (2–6)	None	12,609	62–88
151	September 24	Cubs	3–2 (10)	**Mitch Williams** (4–8)	Bob Scanlan (3–6)	None	12,963	63–88
–	September 25	Cardinals	Postponed (rain); Makeup: September 27 as a traditional double-header					
152	September 26 (1)	Cardinals	3–1	**Curt Schilling** (14–10)	Joe Magrane (1–2)	None	see 2nd game	64–88
153	September 26 (2)	Cardinals	10–0	**Ben Rivera** (7–4)	Donovan Osborne (10–9)	None	16,189	65–88
154	September 27 (1)	Cardinals	1–8	Rhéal Cormier (9–10)	**Brad Brink** (0–4)	None	see 2nd game	65–89
155	September 27 (2)	Cardinals	6–5	**Mike Hartley** (7–6)	Bryn Smith (3–2)	**Mitch Williams** (27)	20,274	66–89
156	September 28 (1)	@ Mets	7–6 (10)	**Mitch Williams** (5–8)	Jeff Innis (6–9)	None	see 2nd game	67–89
157	September 28 (2)	@ Mets	7–6	**Greg Mathews** (1–3)	Joe Vitko (0–1)	**Keith Shepherd** (2)	8,915	68–89
158	September 29	@ Mets	5–3	**Bob Ayrault** (2–2)	Anthony Young (2–14)	**Mitch Williams** (28)	7,283	69–89
159	September 30	@ Mets	2–6	Sid Fernandez (14–11)	**Kyle Abbott** (1–14)	None	6,350	69–90

October (1–2)

#	Date	Opponent	Score	Win	Loss	Save	Attendance	Record
160	October 2	@ Cardinals	1–2	Donovan Osborne (11–9)	**Curt Schilling** (14–11)	Lee Smith (42)	17,724	69–91
161	October 3	@ Cardinals	3–2	**Greg Mathews** (2–3)	Lee Smith (4–9)	**Mitch Williams** (29)	20,311	70–91
162	October 4	@ Cardinals	3–6	Rhéal Cormier (10–10)	**Tommy Greene** (3–3)	Lee Smith (43)	32,475	70–92

=== Roster ===
1992 Philadelphia Phillies
**Roster**
**Pitchers**: 47 Kyle Abbott; 40 Andy Ashby; 55 Bob Ayrault; 56 Jay Baller; 51 Cliff Brantley; 31 Brad Brink; 41 Darrin Chapin; 21 Pat Combs; 34 Danny Cox; 50 José DeLeón; 49 Tommy Greene; 42 Mike Hartley; 50 Barry Jones; 53 Greg Mathews; 45 Terry Mulholland; 39 Wally Ritchie; 34 Ben Rivera; 35 Don Robinson; 38 Curt Schilling; 24 Steve Searcy; 52 Keith Shepherd; 52 Mickey Weston; 41 Mike Williams; 28 Mitch Williams	**Catchers**: 10 Darren Daulton; 48 Jeff Grotewold; 30 Steve Lake; 23 Todd Pratt; **Infielders**: 6 Wally Backman; 5 Kim Batiste; 24 Juan Bell; 15 Dave Hollins; 17 Ricky Jordan; 29 John Kruk; 27 Joe Millette; 12 Mickey Morandini; 31 Steve Scarsone; 8 Dale Sveum	**Outfielders**: 33 Rubén Amaro, Jr.; 16 Braulio Castillo; 44 Wes Chamberlain; 7 Mariano Duncan; 4 Len Dykstra; 22 Stan Javier; 19 Jim Lindeman; 9 Tom Marsh; 3 Dale Murphy; 37 Julio Peguero	**Manager**: 11 Jim Fregosi; **Coaches**: 2 Larry Bowa (third base); 14 Denis Menke (hitting); 46 Johnny Podres (pitching); 26 Mel Roberts (first base); 5 Mike Ryan (bullpen); 18 John Vukovich (bench)

== Player stats ==
= Indicates team leader

= Indicates league leader

=== Batting ===
==== Starters by position ====
Note: Pos = Position; G = Games played; AB = At bats; H = Hits; Avg. = Batting average; HR = Home runs; RBI = Runs batted in

Pos	Player	G	AB	H	Avg.	HR	RBI
C	Darren Daulton	145	485	131	.270	27	109
1B	John Kruk	144	507	164	.323	10	70
2B	Mickey Morandini	127	422	112	.265	3	30
3B	Dave Hollins	156	586	158	.270	27	93
SS	Juan Bell	46	147	30	.204	1	8
LF	Mariano Duncan	142	574	153	.267	8	50
CF	Lenny Dykstra	85	345	104	.301	6	39
RF	Rubén Amaro	126	374	82	.219	7	34

==== Other batters ====
Note: G = Games played; AB = At bats; H = Hits; Avg. = Batting average; HR = Home runs; RBI = Runs batted in

Player	G	AB	H	Avg.	HR	RBI
Stan Javier	74	276	72	.261	0	24
Ricky Jordan	94	276	84	.304	4	34
Wes Chamberlain	76	275	71	.258	9	41
Kim Batiste	44	136	28	.206	1	10
Dale Sveum	54	135	24	.178	2	16
Tom Marsh	42	125	25	.200	2	16
Joe Millette	33	78	16	.205	0	2
Braulio Castillo	28	76	15	.197	2	7
Jeff Grotewold	72	65	13	.200	3	5
Dale Murphy	18	62	10	.161	2	7
Steve Lake	20	53	13	.245	1	2
Wally Backman	12	48	13	.271	0	6
Todd Pratt	16	46	13	.283	2	10
Jim Lindeman	29	39	10	.256	1	6
Steve Scarsone	7	13	2	.154	0	0
Julio Peguero	14	9	2	.222	0	0

=== Pitching ===
==== Starting pitchers ====
Note: G = Games pitched; IP = Innings pitched; W = Wins; L = Losses; ERA = Earned run average; SO = Strikeouts

Player	G	IP	W	L	ERA	SO
Terry Mulholland	32	229.0	13	11	3.81	125
Ben Rivera	20	102.0	7	3	2.82	66
Tommy Greene	13	64.1	3	3	5.32	39
Don Robinson	8	43.2	1	4	6.18	17
Brad Brink	8	41.1	0	4	4.14	16
Danny Cox	9	38.1	2	2	5.40	30
Andy Ashby	10	37.0	1	3	7.54	24
Mike Williams	5	28.2	1	1	5.34	5
Pat Combs	4	18.2	1	1	7.71	11
José DeLeón	3	15.0	0	1	3.00	7
Mickey Weston	1	3.2	0	1	12.27	0

==== Other pitchers ====
Note: G = Games pitched; IP = Innings pitched; W = Wins; L = Losses; ERA = Earned run average; SO = Strikeouts

Player	G	IP	W	L	ERA	SO
Curt Schilling	42	226.1	14	11	2.35	147
Kyle Abbott	31	133.1	1	14	5.13	88
Cliff Brantley	28	76.1	2	6	4.60	32
Greg Mathews	14	52.1	2	3	5.16	27

==== Relief pitchers ====
Note: G = Games pitched; IP = Innings pitched; W = Wins; L = Losses; ERA = Earned run average; SO = Strikeouts

Player	G	W	L	SV	ERA	SO
Mitch Williams	66	5	8	29	3.78	74
Mike Hartley	46	7	6	0	3.44	53
Barry Jones	44	5	6	0	4.64	19
Wally Ritchie	40	2	1	1	3.00	19
Bob Ayrault	30	2	2	0	3.12	27
Keith Shepherd	12	1	1	2	3.27	10
Steve Searcy	10	0	0	0	6.10	5
Jay Baller	8	0	0	0	8.18	9
Darrin Chapin	1	0	0	0	9.00	1

== Farm system ==
Level	Team	League	Manager
AAA	Scranton/Wilkes-Barre; Red Barons	International League	Lee Elia
AA	Reading Phillies	Eastern League	Don McCormack
A	Clearwater Phillies	Florida State League	Bill Dancy
A	Spartanburg Phillies	South Atlantic League	Roy Majtyka
A-Short Season	Batavia Clippers	New York–Penn League	Ramón Avilés
Rookie	Martinsville Phillies	Appalachian League	Roly de Armas
