= 1992 New York Mets season =

1992 New York Mets
- League: National League
- Division: East
- Ballpark: Shea Stadium
- City: New York
- Record: 72–90 (.444)
- Divisional place: 5th
- Owners: Fred Wilpon and Nelson Doubleday, Jr.
- General manager: Al Harazin
- Manager: Jeff Torborg
- Television: WWOR-TV/SportsChannel New York (Ralph Kiner, Tim McCarver, Fran Healy, Rusty Staub, Bob Carpenter)
- Radio: WFAN (Bob Murphy, Gary Cohen, Todd Kalas); WSKQ-FM (spanish) (Juan Alicea, Billy Berroa, Renato Morffi, Armando Talavera)

The 1992 New York Mets season was the 31st regular season for the Mets. The Mets entered the season attempting to improve on their 1991 season, where, due to a second half collapse, they finished 78–84 and recorded their first losing record since 1983. Instead, they had a worse record of 72–90, missing the playoffs for the fourth consecutive year. All 81 of the Mets' home games were played at Shea Stadium.

Entering the season with the highest payroll in baseball, the 1992 Mets were considered one of the most disappointing teams in franchise history.

On the last day of the season, Mets’ players issued an apology letter to the fans, which was signed by each player.

== Background ==
After contending for most of the first two-thirds of the 1991 season, the Mets collapsed during the last two months of the season and tumbled from second place to fifth and manager Bud Harrelson was fired with seven games left in the season. Jeff Torborg, who had managed the Chicago White Sox to a second-place finish in 1991, was signed to a four-year contract to take over as manager.

In memory of the man responsible for bringing National League baseball back to New York, the Mets wore a memorial patch for William A. Shea during this season.

=== Major acquisitions ===
The Mets' front office went to work trying to rebuild their squad that was only three years removed from their last playoff appearance. Their biggest acquisition was Pittsburgh Pirates outfielder Bobby Bonilla, who signed a five-year contract for just over $29 million that was one of the largest in league history at the time.

The Mets also made it a priority to acquire a top starting pitcher who could complement Dwight Gooden and David Cone at the front of the rotation. After going to great lengths to acquire him in 1989, Frank Viola had largely filled that role. Viola had entered 1991 coming off a 20-win season and had made his third All-Star team. However, his performance declined after that, and he finished with only two wins in his final twelve decisions after starting 11-5. The Mets did not renew his contract, and Viola left for Boston.

The Mets eventually settled on Kansas City Royals ace Bret Saberhagen, whom they acquired in a December 1991 trade. former All-Star and world champion, Saberhagen posted a 13–8 record and a 3.07 ERA for the 1991 season, and was one of seven pitchers that year to throw a no-hitter. The price the Mets paid to acquire Saberhagen, however, was fairly steep as they were forced to give up two of their more productive offensive pieces. One of those players was their former top prospect, second baseman Gregg Jefferies; although he had not realized his full potential to this point in his career, Jefferies had managed to lead the Mets in batting average in 1991. The other was veteran outfielder Kevin McReynolds, who had been a consistent middle-of-the-lineup bat; he finished second on the Mets in hits, doubles, home runs, and RBI in 1991 and, although his batting average was not particularly high, finished tied with Howard Johnson for second in batting average.

The Mets' acquisitions were rounded out by a pair of veterans. Second baseman Willie Randolph, who had spent 1991 with the Milwaukee Brewers, was brought in to replace Jefferies and had finished among the American League leaders in batting average the year before. To add some power to the lineup, the Mets also brought in Eddie Murray, who had been playing first base for the Los Angeles Dodgers.

=== Returning players ===
Although the Mets lost their leading hitter when they acquired Saberhagen, they were returning the defending National League leader in home runs and runs batted in with utility man Howard Johnson.

Gooden and Cone would be returning to front the rotation. Gooden had finished 1991 with a 13-7 record, six fewer wins than his 1990 campaign, and was the only Mets starter to record a record above .500. Cone won fourteen games while losing fourteen as well, but as he had in 1990, he led the National League in strikeouts with 241. Nineteen of those came in the final game of the season against the Philadelphia Phillies, where Cone tied the then-NL record while allowing only one hit in the Mets' victory.

== Season ==
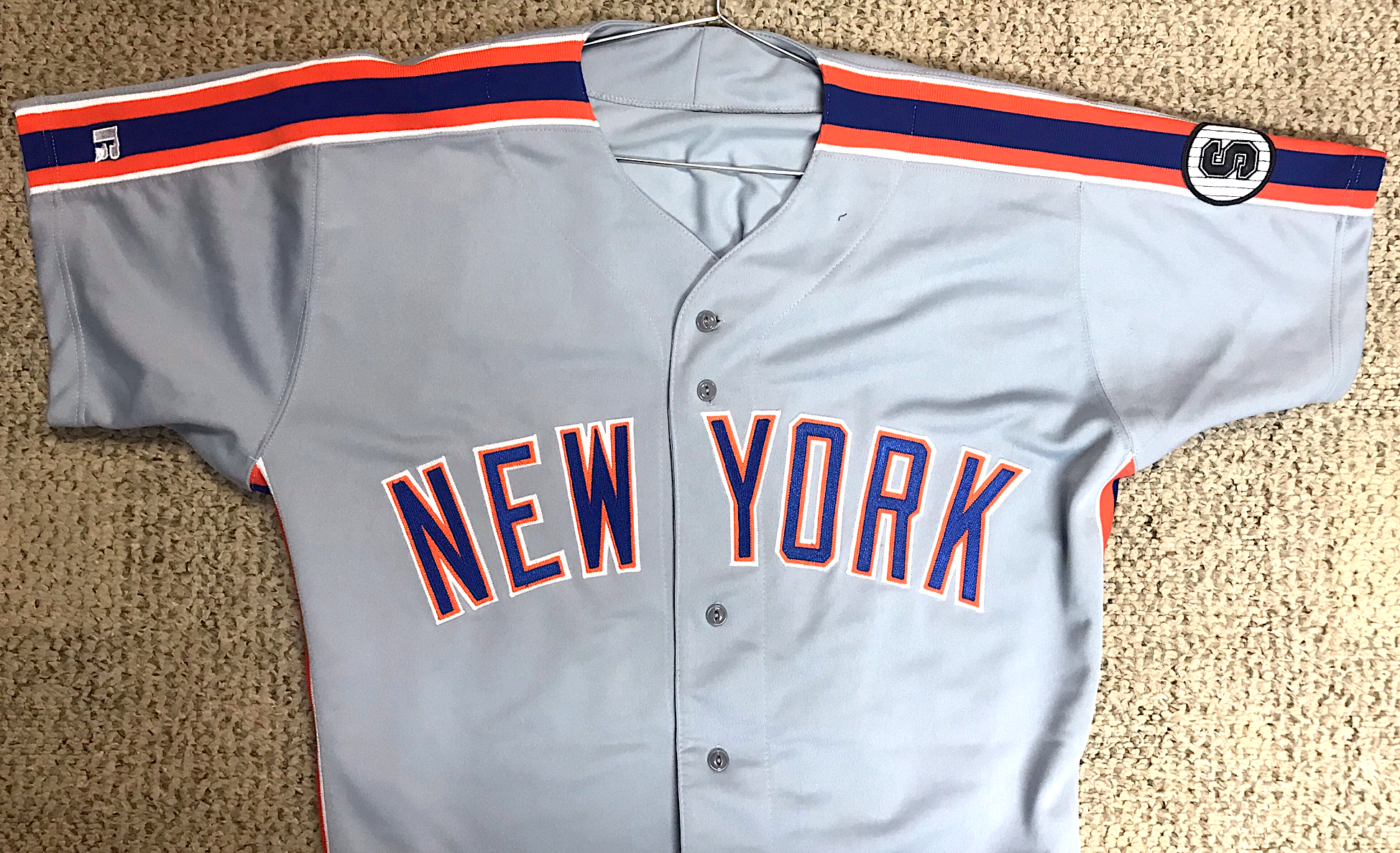
1992 New York Mets road jersey with William Shea memorial patch on left sleeve

Despite the high expectations, the Mets regressed and finished the season with a 72–90 record, their first 90-loss season since 1983. The team managed to hover near .500 at the All-Star Break but only won thirty times afterward.

The two marquee acquisitions for the Mets both fizzled in their first year in New York. Bonilla, despite improving his home run total from 1991 by one, drove in only 70 runs and hit below .250, drawing boos from the local fans who were expecting more from him given his record contract. Saberhagen was injured and ineffective throughout the season and only recorded fifteen starts with a 3–5 record. Murray had a similar season to his 1991 All-Star campaign with the Dodgers, but that only translated to a .261 average and sixteen home runs (although he managed to record 93 RBIs, which by far and away led the team). Among the team's other acquisitions, Randolph, who would go on to retire following the season, was injured for most of the campaign and only managed to play in 90 games. The Mets also traded for Dick Schofield early in the season to play shortstop; although he was fairly solid defensively, Schofield had not been a consistent hitter in his career and this was no exception, as he batted .205 and failed to reach 100 hits despite having over 400 plate appearances (the third time in his career that he had done this).

As far as returning players, Howard Johnson suffered a tremendous falloff from his 1991 campaign. Spending much of the year injured and only appearing in 100 games, Johnson's home run total dropped to seven and his RBI total fell by more than half. Vince Coleman would return from a torn hamstring suffered in 1991, but missed 91 games due in part to injuries and in part to discipline issues that cost him the entire final month of the season. Daryl Boston was the only other Met besides Bonilla and Murray to surpass 10 home runs, and no Met who qualified for the batting title could top Murray's .261. By contrast, two of the three players sent to the Royals for Saberhagen hit above .280, and Gregg Jefferies recorded new career highs in batting average, hits, and RBI (his total of 75 would have been second on the Mets behind Murray and five more than Bonilla recorded).

The pitching staff also had its share of issues. Closer John Franco missed much of the year with injuries, so the Mets decided to give the closer's role to Anthony Young, who had not pitched particularly well as a starter. After he found initial success, converting his first twelve save opportunities, he blew five of his last eight and took the loss in all five. After winning his first two decisions as a starter, Young would take the loss in the remaining fourteen games where he was the pitcher of record, leaving him with a 2–14 overall mark for the season.

Sid Fernandez led the Mets in wins and ERA, while in contrast Gooden posted his worst record as a starter to that point in his career, finishing at 10–13 and with a career low 145 strikeouts. Saberhagen, the major offseason acquisition, only managed to record a 3–5 record in seventeen games with fifteen starts as injuries kept him out of the rotation.

In August, the Mets parted ways with David Cone after he recorded a 13–7 record and 214 strikeouts, the latter total leading the National League. Cone was traded to the Toronto Blue Jays for two prospects, one of which was future All-Star second baseman Jeff Kent. Although Cone continued to accumulate statistics, striking out 47 batters with the Blue Jays for the remainder of the year, according to baseball rules his strikeout total was frozen at 214 due to his switching to the American League. The total held, however, until the last day of the season, when John Smoltz of the Atlanta Braves caught and passed Cone with 215 strikeouts. Cone would finish with a 17-10 record across both leagues, led the entire MLB with 261 strikeouts, was one of only five pitchers that season to record more than 200 strikeouts (Smoltz, Randy Johnson, Melido Perez, and Roger Clemens were the others), and earned a World Series ring after the Blue Jays defeated Smoltz and the Braves (although he did not record a decision in his two starts, one of which was against Smoltz in Game 2).

== Criticism ==
The fact that the Mets made such inroads to increase payroll with little to no result, combined with the distant attitudes and actions of some of the players and Jeff Torborg's inability to maintain control of the chaotic situation, led to a controversial account of the inner workings of the Mets during that 1992 season. The book was written by current Newark Star-Ledger writer Bob Klapisch and current New York Daily News baseball writer John Harper, and titled The Worst Team Money Could Buy: The Collapse of the New York Mets (ISBN 0-8032-7822-5),

Shortly after the book's April 1993 release, Klapisch was confronted by an irate Bobby Bonilla. Bonilla threatened Klapisch and kept trying to goad him into a physical confrontation.

== Offseason ==
- December 2, 1991: Bobby Bonilla was signed as a free agent by the Mets.
- December 10, 1991: Hubie Brooks was traded by the Mets to the California Angels for Dave Gallagher.
- December 11, 1991: Kevin McReynolds, Gregg Jefferies and Keith Miller were traded by the Mets to the Kansas City Royals for Bret Saberhagen and Bill Pecota.
- December 11, 1991: Jeff Gardner was traded by the Mets to the San Diego Padres for Steve Rosenberg.
- December 20, 1991: Willie Randolph was signed as a free agent by the Mets.

== Regular season ==
=== Season standings ===
NL East
Team	W	L	Pct.	GB	Home	Road
Pittsburgh Pirates	96	66	.593	—	53‍–‍28	43‍–‍38
Montreal Expos	87	75	.537	9	43‍–‍38	44‍–‍37
St. Louis Cardinals	83	79	.512	13	45‍–‍36	38‍–‍43
Chicago Cubs	78	84	.481	18	43‍–‍38	35‍–‍46
New York Mets	72	90	.444	24	41‍–‍40	31‍–‍50
Philadelphia Phillies	70	92	.432	26	41‍–‍40	29‍–‍52

=== Record vs. opponents ===
1992 National League record Sources:
Team	ATL	CHC	CIN	HOU	LAD	MON	NYM	PHI	PIT	SD	SF	STL
Atlanta	—	10–2	9–9	13–5	12–6	4–8	7–5	6–6	7–5	13–5	11–7	6–6
Chicago	2–10	—	5–7	8–4	6–6	7–11	9–9	9–9	8–10	5–7	8–4	11–7
Cincinnati	9–9	7–5	—	10–8	11–7	5–7	7–5	7–5	6–6	11–7	10–8	7–5
Houston	5–13	4–8	8–10	—	13–5	8–4	5–7	8–4	6–6	7–11	12–6	5–7
Los Angeles	6–12	6–6	7–11	5–13	—	4–8	5–7	5–7	5–7	9–9	7–11	4–8
Montreal	8–4	11–7	7–5	4–8	8–4	—	12–6	9–9	9–9	8–4	5–7	6–12
New York	5–7	9–9	5–7	7–5	7–5	6–12	—	6–12	4–14	4–8	10–2	9–9
Philadelphia	6-6	9–9	5–7	4–8	7–5	9–9	12–6	—	5–13	3–9	3–9	7–11
Pittsburgh	5–7	10–8	6–6	6–6	7–5	9–9	14–4	13–5	—	5–7	6–6	15–3
San Diego	5–13	7–5	7–11	11–7	9–9	4–8	8–4	9–3	7–5	—	11–7	4–8
San Francisco	7–11	4–8	8–10	6–12	11–7	7–5	2–10	9–3	6–6	7–11	—	5–7
St. Louis	6–6	7–11	5–7	7–5	8–4	12–6	9–9	11–7	3–15	8–4	7–5	—

=== Opening Day starters ===
- Bobby Bonilla
- Daryl Boston
- Kevin Elster
- Dwight Gooden
- Howard Johnson
- Dave Magadan
- Eddie Murray
- Charlie O'Brien
- Willie Randolph

=== Notable transactions ===
- April 12, 1992: Julio Valera and a player to be named later was traded by the Mets to the California Angels for Dick Schofield. The Mets completed the deal by sending Julian Vasquez (minors) to the Angels on October 6.
- June 1, 1992: Darin Erstad was drafted by the Mets in the 13th round of the 1992 Major League Baseball draft, but did not sign.
- August 27, 1992: David Cone was traded by the Mets to the Toronto Blue Jays for Jeff Kent and a player to be named later. The Blue Jays completed the deal by sending Ryan Thompson to the Mets on September 1.

== Roster ==
1992 New York Mets
Roster
Pitchers: 49 Mike Birkbeck; 44 Tim Burke; 17 David Cone; 43 Mark Dewey; 50 Sid Fernandez; 44 Tom Filer; 31 John Franco; 45 Paul Gibson; 16 Dwight Gooden; 35 Lee Guetterman; 53 Eric Hillman; 40 Jeff Innis; 46 Barry Jones; 18 Bret Saberhagen; 48 Pete Schourek; 49 Joe Vitko; 47 Wally Whitehurst; 19 Anthony Young	Catchers: 9 Todd Hundley; 22 Charlie O'Brien; 2 Mackey Sasser; Infielders: 36 Kevin Baez; 23 Chris Donnels; 15 Kevin Elster; 39 Jeff Kent; 29 Dave Magadan; 5 Jeff McKnight; 33 Eddie Murray; 3 Junior Noboa; 32 Bill Pecota; 12 Willie Randolph; 11 Dick Schofield; 13 Steve Springer; 34 Chico Walker	Outfielders: 21 Kevin Bass; 25 Bobby Bonilla; 6 Daryl Boston; 1 Vince Coleman; 7 D. J. Dozier; 8 Dave Gallagher; 38 Pat Howell; 20 Howard Johnson; 13 Rodney McCray; 44 Ryan Thompson	Manager: 10 Jeff Torborg; Coaches: 4 Mike Cubbage (third base); 26 Barry Foote (first base); 28 Dave LaRoche (bullpen); 27 Tom McCraw (hitting); 30 Mel Stottlemyre (pitching)

== Player stats ==
=== Batting ===
==== Starters by position ====
Note: Pos = Position; G = Games played; AB = At bats; H = Hits; Avg. = Batting average; HR = Home runs; RBI = Runs batted in

Pos	Player	G	AB	H	Avg.	HR	RBI
C	Todd Hundley	123	358	75	.209	7	32
1B	Eddie Murray	156	551	144	.261	16	93
2B	Willie Randolph	90	286	72	.252	2	15
3B	Dave Magadan	99	321	91	.283	3	28
SS	Dick Schofield	142	420	86	.205	4	36
LF	Daryl Boston	130	289	72	.249	11	35
CF	Howard Johnson	100	350	78	.223	7	43
RF	Bobby Bonilla	128	438	109	.249	19	70

==== Other batters ====
Note: G = Games played; AB = At bats; H = Hits; Avg. = Batting average; HR = Home runs; RBI = Runs batted in

Player	G	AB	H	Avg.	HR	RBI
Bill Pecota	117	269	61	.227	2	26
Vince Coleman	71	229	63	.275	2	21
Chico Walker	107	227	70	.308	4	36
Dave Gallagher	98	175	42	.240	1	21
Charlie O'Brien	68	156	33	.212	2	13
Mackey Sasser	92	141	34	.241	2	18
Kevin Bass	46	137	37	.270	2	9
Chris Donnels	45	121	21	.174	0	6
Jeff Kent	37	113	27	.239	3	15
Ryan Thompson	30	108	24	.222	3	10
Jeff McKnight	31	85	23	.271	2	13
Pat Howell	31	75	14	.187	0	1
D.J. Dozier	25	47	9	.191	0	2
Junior Noboa	46	47	7	.149	0	3
Kevin Elster	6	18	4	.222	0	0
Kevin Baez	6	13	2	.154	0	0
Steve Springer	4	5	2	.400	0	0
Rodney McCray	18	1	1	1.000	0	1

=== Pitching ===
==== Starting pitchers ====
Note: G = Games pitched; IP = Innings pitched; W = Wins; L = Losses; ERA = Earned run average; SO = Strikeouts

Player	G	IP	W	L	ERA	SO
Sid Fernandez	32	214.2	14	11	2.73	193
Dwight Gooden	31	206.0	10	13	3.67	145
David Cone	27	196.2	13	7	2.88	214
Pete Schourek	22	136.0	6	8	3.64	60
Bret Saberhagen	17	97.2	3	5	3.50	81
Eric Hillman	11	52.1	2	2	5.33	16
Mike Birkbeck	1	7.0	0	1	9.00	2

==== Other pitchers ====
Note: G = Games pitched; IP = Innings pitched; W = Wins; L = Losses; ERA = Earned run average; SO = Strikeouts

Player	G	IP	W	L	ERA	SO
Anthony Young	52	121.0	2	14	4.17	64
Wally Whitehurst	44	97.0	3	9	3.62	70
Tom Filer	9	22.0	0	1	2.05	9
Joe Vitko	3	4.2	0	1	13.50	6

==== Relief pitchers ====
Note: G = Games pitched; W = Wins; L = Losses; SV = Saves; ERA = Earned run average; SO = Strikeouts

Player	G	W	L	SV	ERA	SO
John Franco	31	6	2	15	1.64	20
Jeff Innis	76	6	9	1	2.86	39
Paul Gibson	43	0	1	0	5.23	49
Lee Guetterman	43	3	4	2	5.82	15
Mark Dewey	20	1	0	0	4.32	24
Barry Jones	17	2	0	1	9.39	11
Tim Burke	15	1	2	0	5.74	7
Bill Pecota	1	0	0	0	9.00	0

== Farm system ==
Level	Team	League	Manager
AAA	Tidewater Tides	International League	Clint Hurdle
AA	Binghamton Mets	Eastern League	Steve Swisher
A	St. Lucie Mets	Florida State League	John Tamargo
A	Columbia Mets	South Atlantic League	Tim Blackwell
A-Short Season	Pittsfield Mets	New York–Penn League	Jim Thrift
Rookie	Kingsport Mets	Appalachian League	Andre David
Rookie	GCL Mets	Gulf Coast League	Junior Roman

LEAGUE CHAMPIONS: Binghamton
