= Ayrault =

Ayrault is a surname. Notable people with the surname include:

- Dan Ayrault (1935–1990), American competition rower and Olympic champion
- Bob Ayrault (born 1966), former Major League Baseball pitcher
- Jean-Marc Ayrault (born 1950), prime minister of France from 2012 to 2014
- Joe Ayrault (born 1971), former Major League Baseball catcher
- Theodore Ayrault Dodge (1842–1909), American officer and military historian
