= Peguero =

Peguero is a Spanish surname of Italian origin. The name is most common in the Dominican Republic.

From the ancient and picturesque Italian region of Venice emerged a variety of distinguished names, including the notable surname Peguero. Although people were originally known only by a single name, it became necessary for people to adopt a second name to identify themselves as populations grew and travel became more frequent. The process of adopting fixed hereditary surnames was not complete until the modern era, but the use of hereditary family names in Italy began in the 10th and 11th centuries. Italian hereditary surnames were developed according to fairly general principles and they are characterized by a profusion of derivatives coined from given names. Although the most traditional type of family name found in the region of Venice is the patronymic surname, which is derived from the father's given name, local surnames are also found. Local names, which are the least frequent of the major types of surnames found in Italy, are derived from a place-name where the original bearer once resided or held land. Often Italian local surnames bore the prefix "di," which signifies emigration from one place to another, but does not necessarily denote nobility. The Peguero family lived in the Pecorara valley, where the Pecora family held vast lands and resided in an elegant feudal manor. The surname Peguero was first found in the city of Piacenza, which lies almost on the border between Emilia-Romagna and Lombardy. Records are found with Marco, Guisengo, Albrigono and Vitore Pecoraria in 1160. This family took their name from the Pecorara valley, over which they had some possession.

Last name: Peguero Nobility: Señores - Familia Noble Nobles in:España (Manresa - Vizcaya) Early Origins of the Peguero family

Peguero Aragonese. Lineage of Aragonese infanzones originating from the mountains of Jaca, with branches in Jaca and Letux; some members of this family went to Catalonia. Match in suit: 1st, gules with a clothed arm that wields a silver war ax with a gold shaft, 2nd, azure with another clothed arm, which also wields a silver pickaxe with a gold shaft. | Others: Of gold, a sinople tree, trained with a spear and sinister with an abarca, surpassed by a star. [A. and A.G. Carraffa] [Enc. Aragonese] [Bizén O'Río]. Shield of the Peguero, according to Enc. Aragonese and other authors.

Catalan lineage originating from the Manresa veguería. It is ancient and noble. On his excursion to Sardinia, Ramón Peguero. accompanied King Don Pedro de Aragón, and was a deputy in Catalonia in 1459. Guillermo Peguero. was Commander of Espluga de Francolí, in the Order of San Juan, in the Great Priory of Catalonia, in the years between 1473 and 1501, and of Algayre, in 1492. And they dressed the habit of the same Order, Juan P. Vilafranca Cruilles, and Ferrer, in 1541; his brother Galcerán, in 1545; Onofre Peguero., in 1557, and Francisco Peguero. Guixós Llaudés Prats, in 1604. They had a very main house in the place of Torrelles de Foix, of the judicial district of Vilafranca del Penedés and province of Barcelona. The noble Roque Peguero., whom Mosén Jaime Febrer mentions in his Trovas, for having served the King of Aragon Don Jaime I

Santo domingo

Immigrants: These families correspond to the saints of the San José de Hato Mayor church, and to others who arrived as nomadic shepherds and stayed, attracted by the healthy climate, the hospitable people and the food potential that the region exhibited in its urban beginnings. Among these we mention the families Guillermo, Sánchez, Mejía, De los Reyes, Hurtado, Santana, Jiménez, Polanco, Núñez, Silvestre, Díaz, Ramírez, Leguizamón, Peguero, Carrasco, Bastardo, Morales, Sia, Vásquez, Castillo, Miches, De the Mote, Snow... Since the Devastations of Osorio, which occurred in 1605, entire families were moving towards the eastern zone, with a greater proportion during the Haitian invasions, noting that local surnames keep homonymy with those of other towns.

Early History of the Peguero family This web page shows only a small excerpt of our Peguero research. More information is included under the topic Early Peguero History in all our PDF Extended History products and printed products wherever possible. Peguero Spelling Variations In comparison with other European surnames, Italian surnames have a surprising number of forms. They reflect the regional variations and the many dialects of the Italian language, each with its own distinctive features. For example, in Northern Italy the typical Italian surname suffix is "i", whereas in Southern Italy it is "o". Additionally, spelling changes frequently occurred because medieval scribes and church officials often spelled names as they sounded rather than according to any specific spelling rules. The spelling variations in the name Peguero include Pecora, Pecori, Peguri, Pecorella, Pecorelli, Pegoretti, Pecorino, Pecorini, Pegorin, Pecorai, Pecoraro, Pecorari, Pecoraria, Pegoraro and many more.

Early Notables of the Peguero family (pre 1700) Prominent among members of the family was Iacopo del Pecora, a 14th century Tuscan poet who wrote love sonnets and many works with prevalent spiritual themes. His best work is considered to be "Fimerodia," a poem modelled on Dante Alighieri's "Divina Commedia." Pecorario dei Pecorari was mayor of Mercato... Another 49 words (4 lines of text) are included under the topic Early Peguero Notables in all our PDF Extended History products and printed products wherever possible.

Peguero Ranking In the United States, the name Peguero is the 15,707th most popular surname with an estimated 2,487 people with that name. [1]

Migration of the Peguero family A look at the immigration and passenger lists has shown a number of people bearing the name Peguero: Agata Pecoraro, aged 2, who arrived at Ellis Island, in 1897; Agustino Pecoraro, aged 7, who arrived at Ellis Island from Palermo, in 1900; Alfonso Pecoraro, aged 20, who arrived at Ellis Island from Fisciano, Italy, in 1909.

Contemporary Notables of the name Peguero Jailen Lorenzo Peguero (b. 1981), Dominican professional baseball relief pitcher Carlos Angel Peguero (b. 1987), Dominican Major League Baseball left fielder for the Kansas City Royals

Notable people with this surname include:

- Arismendy Peguero (born 1980), Dominican sprinter
- Carlos Peguero (born 1987), Dominican baseball left fielder
- Elvis Peguero (born 1997), Dominican baseball pitcher
- Francisco Peguero (born 1988), Dominican baseball outfielder
- Jailen Peguero (born 1981), Dominican baseball relief pitcher
- Julio Peguero (born 1968), Dominican retired baseball outfielder
- Liover Peguero (born 2000), Dominican baseball player
- Olivia Peguero (born 20th century), Dominican artist
- Felix Peguero-Luna (born 1959), Retired Dominican Soldier for the U.S. Army
- Ray Peguero (born 1994), Disabled Veteran for U.S. Air Force

Notable people with this given name include:

- Peguero Jean Philippe (also known as Jean Philippe Peguero; born 1981), Haitian footballer
