= Bob Klapisch =

American journalist (born 1957)

- Born: Bob Klapisch; August 14, 1957 (age 69); New York, NY, U.S.
- Occupation: Writer

Roberto Salvador "Bob" Klapisch (born August 14, 1957) is a sportswriter for the Newark Star Ledger. He has previously written for The New York Times, New York Post, ESPN, Fox Sports and New York Daily News, and has written six books about baseball including the New York Times best seller Inside The Empire: The True Power Behind the New York Yankees. He has been a voting member of the Baseball Writers' Association of America since 1983.

Klapisch was born in New York City and grew up in Leonia, New Jersey, where he attended Leonia High School. He was awarded a bachelor's degree, majoring in political science, from Columbia University, where he played varsity baseball and was sports editor of the university newspaper, the Columbia Daily Spectator.

In response to his book on the 1992 Mets, The Worst Team Money Could Buy: The Collapse of the New York Mets (ISBN 0-8032-7822-5), New York Mets outfielder Bobby Bonilla confronted Klapisch in the team's clubhouse, threatening him, and having to be restrained. Klapisch is half-Brazilian and speaks Portuguese fluently.

== Books Written ==
- The Worst Team Money Could Buy: The Collapse of the New York Mets (with John Harper, 1993)
- High and Tight: The Rise and Fall of Dwight Gooden and Darryl Strawberry (1996)
- Champions!: The Saga of the 1996 New York Yankees (1996)
- The World Champion Braves: An Illustrated History of America's Team 1871-1995 (with Pete Van Wieren, 1995)
- '98 Champs: The Greatest Season, a Chronicle of the Yankees' Amazing Journey to the World Championship (with Adrian Wojnarowski, Ken Davidoff, 1998)
- Heat: My Life on and Off the Diamond (with Dwight Gooden, 1999)
- Inside The Empire: The True Power Behind the New York Yankees (with Paul Solotaroff, 2019)
