= 1992 St. Louis Cardinals season =

Major League Baseball season

1992 St. Louis Cardinals
- League: National League
- Division: East
- Ballpark: Busch Memorial Stadium
- City: St. Louis, Missouri
- Record: 83–79 (.512)
- Divisional place: 3rd
- Owners: Anheuser-Busch
- General managers: Dal Maxvill
- Managers: Joe Torre
- Television: KPLR (Al Hrabosky, George Grande)
- Radio: KMOX (Jack Buck, Mike Shannon, Joe Buck)

The 1992 St. Louis Cardinals season was the team's 111th season in St. Louis, Missouri and its 101st season in the National League. The Cardinals went 83–79 during the season and finished third in the National League East, 13 games behind the NL East champion Pittsburgh Pirates.

== Offseason ==
- November 25, 1991: Ken Hill was traded by the St. Louis Cardinals to the Montreal Expos for Andrés Galarraga.
- January 15, 1992: Ozzie Canseco signed as a free agent with the St. Louis Cardinals.

== Regular season ==
Starting pitcher Bob Tewksbury posted his best season with a 2.16 ERA, second-best in the NL, and topped the league walks per nine innings and strikeout-to-walk ratio. He finished third in the Cy Young voting. Catcher Tom Pagnozzi posted the sixteenth best single-season fielding mark (tied) in history for his position (.9987).

The team led the National League in batting average at .262 but was just sixth in runs scored. Their 3.38 ERA was fourth in the league.

=== Season standings ===
NL East
Team	W	L	Pct.	GB	Home	Road
Pittsburgh Pirates	96	66	.593	—	53‍–‍28	43‍–‍38
Montreal Expos	87	75	.537	9	43‍–‍38	44‍–‍37
St. Louis Cardinals	83	79	.512	13	45‍–‍36	38‍–‍43
Chicago Cubs	78	84	.481	18	43‍–‍38	35‍–‍46
New York Mets	72	90	.444	24	41‍–‍40	31‍–‍50
Philadelphia Phillies	70	92	.432	26	41‍–‍40	29‍–‍52

=== Record vs. opponents ===
1992 National League record Sources:
Team	ATL	CHC	CIN	HOU	LAD	MON	NYM	PHI	PIT	SD	SF	STL
Atlanta	—	10–2	9–9	13–5	12–6	4–8	7–5	6–6	7–5	13–5	11–7	6–6
Chicago	2–10	—	5–7	8–4	6–6	7–11	9–9	9–9	8–10	5–7	8–4	11–7
Cincinnati	9–9	7–5	—	10–8	11–7	5–7	7–5	7–5	6–6	11–7	10–8	7–5
Houston	5–13	4–8	8–10	—	13–5	8–4	5–7	8–4	6–6	7–11	12–6	5–7
Los Angeles	6–12	6–6	7–11	5–13	—	4–8	5–7	5–7	5–7	9–9	7–11	4–8
Montreal	8–4	11–7	7–5	4–8	8–4	—	12–6	9–9	9–9	8–4	5–7	6–12
New York	5–7	9–9	5–7	7–5	7–5	6–12	—	6–12	4–14	4–8	10–2	9–9
Philadelphia	6-6	9–9	5–7	4–8	7–5	9–9	12–6	—	5–13	3–9	3–9	7–11
Pittsburgh	5–7	10–8	6–6	6–6	7–5	9–9	14–4	13–5	—	5–7	6–6	15–3
San Diego	5–13	7–5	7–11	11–7	9–9	4–8	8–4	9–3	7–5	—	11–7	4–8
San Francisco	7–11	4–8	8–10	6–12	11–7	7–5	2–10	9–3	6–6	7–11	—	5–7
St. Louis	6–6	7–11	5–7	7–5	8–4	12–6	9–9	11–7	3–15	8–4	7–5	—

=== Roster ===
1992 St. Louis Cardinals
Roster
Pitchers: 49 Juan Agosto; 44 Cris Carpenter; 55 Mark Clark; 52 Rhéal Cormier; 48 José DeLeón; 35 Frank DiPino; 32 Joe Magrane; 22 Bob McClure; 26 Omar Olivares; 31 Donovan Osborne; 42 Mike Pérez; 36 Bryn Smith; 47 Lee Smith; 39 Bob Tewksbury; 38 Todd Worrell	Catchers: 29 Rich Gedman; 19 Tom Pagnozzi; Infielders: 18 Luis Alicea; 33 Rod Brewer; 50 Bien Figueroa; 41 Andrés Galarraga; 28 Pedro Guerrero; 10 Rex Hudler; 8 Tim Jones; 11 José Oquendo; 7 Gerónimo Peña; 21 Gerald Perry; 5 Stan Royer; 1 Ozzie Smith; 12 Craig Wilson; 54 Tracy Woodson; 27 Todd Zeile	Outfielders: 46 Ozzie Canseco; 43 Chuck Carr; 23 Bernard Gilkey; 3 Brian Jordan; 34 Félix José; 16 Ray Lankford; 25 Milt Thompson	Manager: 9 Joe Torre; Coaches: 24 Don Baylor (Hitting); 40 Joe Coleman (Pitching); 15 Dave Collins (First Base); 30 Bucky Dent (Third Base); 4 Gaylen Pitts (Bullpen); 2 Red Schoendienst (Bench)

== Player stats ==
= Indicates team leader

=== Batting ===
==== Starters by position ====
Note: Pos = Position; G = Games played; AB = At bats; H = Hits; Avg. = Batting average; HR = Home runs; RBI = Runs batted in

Pos.	Player	G	AB	H	Avg.	HR	RBI
C	Tom Pagnozzi	139	485	121	.249	7	44
1B	Andrés Galarraga	95	325	79	.243	10	39
2B	Luis Alicea	85	265	65	.245	2	32
3B	Todd Zeile	126	439	113	.257	7	48
SS	Ozzie Smith	132	518	153	.295	0	31
LF	Bernard Gilkey	131	384	116	.302	7	43
CF	Ray Lankford	153	598	175	.293	20	86
RF	Félix José	131	509	150	.295	14	75

==== Other batters ====
Note: G = Games played; AB = At bats; H = Hits; Avg. = Batting average; HR = Home runs; RBI = Runs batted in

Player	G	AB	H	Avg.	HR	RBI
Milt Thompson	109	208	61	.293	4	17
Gerónimo Peña	62	203	62	.305	7	31
Brian Jordan	55	193	40	.207	5	22
Pedro Guerrero	43	146	32	.219	1	16
Tim Jones	67	145	29	.200	0	3
Gerald Perry	87	143	34	.238	1	18
Tracy Woodson	31	114	35	.307	1	22
Craig Wilson	61	106	33	.311	0	13
Rich Gedman	41	105	23	.219	1	8
Rod Brewer	29	103	31	.301	0	10
Rex Hudler	61	98	24	.245	3	15
Chuck Carr	22	64	14	.219	0	3
José Oquendo	14	35	9	.257	0	3
Stan Royer	13	31	10	.323	2	9
Ozzie Canseco	9	29	8	.276	0	3
Bien Figueroa	12	11	2	.182	0	4

=== Pitching ===
= Indicates league leader

==== Starting pitchers ====
Note: G = Games pitched; IP = Innings pitched; W = Wins; L = Losses; ERA = Earned run average; SO = Strikeouts

Player	G	IP	W	L	ERA	SO
Bob Tewksbury	33	233.0	16	5	2.16	91
Omar Olivares	32	197.0	9	9	3.84	124
Rhéal Cormier	31	186.0	10	10	3.68	117
Donovan Osborne	34	179.0	11	9	3.77	104
Mark Clark	20	113.1	3	10	4.45	44
Joe Magrane	5	31.1	1	2	4.02	20

==== Other pitchers ====
Note: G = Games pitched; IP = Innings pitched; W = Wins; L = Losses; ERA = Earned run average; SO = Strikeouts

Player	G	IP	W	L	ERA	SO
José DeLeón	29	102.1	2	7	4.57	72

==== Relief pitchers ====
Note: G = Games pitched; W = Wins; L = Losses; SV = Saves; ERA = Earned run average; SO = Strikeouts

Player	G	W	L	SV	ERA	SO
Lee Smith	70	4	9	43	3.12	60
Mike Pérez	77	9	3	0	1.84	46
Cris Carpenter	73	5	4	1	2.97	46
Bob McClure	71	2	2	0	3.17	24
Todd Worrell	67	5	3	3	2.11	64
Juan Agosto	22	2	4	0	6.25	13
Bryn Smith	13	4	2	0	4.64	9
Frank DiPino	9	0	0	0	1.64	8

== Awards and honors ==
- Cardinals team records: Errorless streak (16 games) and fielding percentage (.985).
- Ozzie Smith: Gold Glove at SS
- Tom Pagnozzi: Gold Glove at C

== Farm system ==
Level	Team	League	Manager
AAA	Louisville Redbirds	American Association	Jack Krol
AA	Arkansas Travelers	Texas League	Joe Pettini
A	St. Petersburg Cardinals	Florida State League	Dave Bialas
A	Springfield Cardinals	Midwest League	Rick Colbert
A	Savannah Cardinals	South Atlantic League	Mike Ramsey
A-Short Season	Hamilton Redbirds	New York–Penn League	Chris Maloney
Rookie	Johnson City Cardinals	Appalachian League	Steve Turco
Rookie	AZL Cardinals	Arizona League	Joe Cunningham, Jr.
