= Thomas Downey High School =

Public school in California, United States

Location
- 1000 Coffee Rd. Modesto; California; United States; 37.657138°N 120.974922°W

Information
- School type: Public
- Opened: September, 1951
- School district: Modesto City Schools
- Principal: Edward Taylor
- Teaching staff: 89.11 (FTE)
- Grades: 9-12
- Enrollment: 2,145 (2022–2023)
- Student to teacher ratio: 24.07
- Hours in school day: 6-8
- Campus type: suburban
- Colour
- Song: Downey Hymn, Downey Fight Song
- Athletics: Football, Volleyball, Golf, Cross Country, Soccer, Waterpolo, Tennis, Basketball, Wrestling, Baseball, Softball, Track, Swimming
- Mascot: Knight
- Newspaper: Knight's Realm
- Yearbook: Shield
- Feeder schools: La Loma Jr. High, Roosevelt Jr. High, Hanshaw Middle School
- Website: http://downey.monet.k12.ca.us/

Thomas Downey High School (TDHS) is a high school in Modesto, California. It is one of the seven high schools in Modesto. Thomas Downey High is the second oldest high school in the city of Modesto and its doors opened to students in the Fall of 1951. Its mascot is the Knight, but they are sometimes humorously referred to as the "Downey Ducks." Although this name seems to have no confirmed origin, the story goes that while the school was being built, a flood occurred and a family of ducks nested. The school's current student population is approximately 2,000 in Grades 9 through 12.

The movie American Graffiti, written and directed by Downey graduate George Lucas, is based in Modesto but filmed in Petaluma, California. The school that students in the film attend is called "Dewey High", but is actually Petaluma High School, the architectural twin to Downey High. "Dewey High" is a reference to Downey. The Block "D" Athletic Jackets and school colors in the movie are Royal Blue and White, identical to Downey's school colors.

Downey's yearbook and newspaper have received awards, but the newspaper has since been discontinued.

The Agriculture Department at Thomas Downey was first created to work the school's early orchards. The orchards have been since cut down, with the department serving as the main welding area for the students of TDHS. Proficient students in welding go on to competitions for the National FFA Organization. If students win competitions, they have a chance to be recognized by superiors in the welding industry. Companies include West-Mark, Caterpillar, and others. Students also raise animals for the Stanislaus County Fair, hoping to gain a profit. The projects range from 3 to 7 months and focus on gardening, animals, and home improvement. Students also have the opportunity to take a floral design class in which students design and sell arrangements.

The school observes designated dress-up days during fall and winter homecoming weeks, Unity Week, and Red Ribbon Week. An annual rally is held for fall homecoming, featuring dance performances and games for homecoming court nominees.

== Singing ==
Downey has five choirs: Concert Choir (mixed ensemble), Madrigals (advanced mixed ensemble), Knightengales (advanced women's ensemble), Knights(men's ensemble), and Gloriana (beginning women's ensemble). The choirs perform three concerts a year: Knight Magic in fall, the holiday concert in the winter, and the spring concert in spring. They also perform at various locations throughout the year, especially during the holiday season. The choirs also go on an annual tour to Southern California in the spring.

== Band ==
For many years, Downey High had a band program. Under the direction of band director and composer, Roger Nixon, who later moved to Modesto Junior College and then San Francisco State University. He wrote the music for the bicentennial of Modesto in 1970 which was performed by the MJC Concert Band under Dr. Jensen. Ken Farrell built on that foundation. By 1974 the Downey band had achieved twenty straight command performances (higher than first place) at various concert band festivals around California. The concert band recorded a record every spring for many years. In 2008 the Downey Concert and Marching Band performed at the Olympics in Beijing, China. In 2020, Alexis True became the director of the Thomas Downey music program. True directs orchestra, marching, pep-band, concert, band, and jazz band.

== Incidents ==
On May 9, 2022, a male student was arrested for bringing a handgun to the school campus.

== Alumni ==
- Dan Archer, NFL player
- Rick Baldwin (baseball), MLB player
- Brad Brink, Major League Baseball Pitcher
- Tony Graziani, former NFL Quarterback
- Bill Heath, former Major League Baseball catcher
- George Lucas, movie director, American Graffiti and Star Wars
- Joan Mitchell, co-inventor of the JPEG digital image format
- Laci Peterson, Murder Victim
- Suzy Powell, Olympian discus thrower
- Joe Rudi, former 3x Golden Glover in MLB.
- Blake Smith, former Major League Baseball player
- Ann Veneman, Secretary of Agriculture for George Bush
- Ron Whitney, Olympian Hurdler
