= List of Major League Baseball replacement players =

This is a list of Major League Baseball replacement players. Major League Baseball, an American and Canadian baseball league, has used replacement players during two strikes: the 1912 Detroit Tigers strike, and the 1994–95 Major League Baseball strike.

== 1994–95 Major League Baseball strike ==
The following Major League Baseball (MLB) players appeared as strikebreakers during spring training in 1995, crossing picket lines during the 1994–95 MLB strike. Some had not yet been placed on a 40-man roster, and as such were not eligible to join the MLB Players Association (MLBPA) at the time of the strike, while others were former MLB players who had retired before the strike. The list does not include replacement players who never appeared in a regular season MLB game.

Several players who were part of World Series-winning teams were not permitted to have their names or likenesses on commemorative merchandise because they participated in 1995 spring training: Shane Spencer of the 1998–2000 New York Yankees, Damian Miller of the 2001 Arizona Diamondbacks, Brendan Donnelly of the 2002 Anaheim Angels, and Brian Daubach and Kevin Millar of the 2004 Boston Red Sox.

Because they are not permitted to join the MLBPA, replacement players' names or likenesses are also generally not included in merchandise that derives its license from the MLBPA, such as video and tabletop games. Many games include these players' statistics and characteristics, with blank or fictional names and different appearances. This practice is similar to how Jon Dowd replaced Barry Bonds in MVP Baseball 2005 after Bonds left the MLBPA in 2003.

One player, Billy McMillon, was allowed to join the MLBPA after playing in a replacement game. The union determined that the Florida Marlins fraudulently told McMillon that a game he would play in was not a replacement game when, in fact, it was.

=== Replacement players ===
==== No MLB experience before strike ====
- Joel Adamson
- Benny Agbayani
- Rudy Árias
- Tony Barron
- Steve Bourgeois
- Doug Brady
- Mike Busch
- Edgar Caceres
- Bubba Carpenter
- Joel Chimelis†
- Alan Cockrell
- Joe Crawford
- Brian Daubach
- Brendan Donnelly
- Angel Echevarria
- Webster Garrison
- Charles Gipson
- Brian Givens
- Scarborough Green
- Dave Hajek
- Jason Hardtke
- Pep Harris
- Matt Herges
- Matt Howard
- Chris Latham
- Cory Lidle
- Kerry Ligtenberg
- Rich Loiselle
- Eric Ludwick
- Ron Mahay
- Tom Martin
- Dan Masteller
- Jamie McAndrew
- Walt McKeel
- Frank Menechino
- Lou Merloni
- Kevin Millar
- Damian Miller
- Eddie Oropesa
- Keith Osik
- Bronswell Patrick
- Dale Polley
- Alex Ramírez
- Ron Rightnowar
- Dan Rohrmeier
- Mandy Romero
- Pete Rose Jr.
- Chuck Smith
- Shane Spencer
- Joe Strong
- Pedro Swann
- Jeff Tam
- Chris Truby
- Jamie Walker

† Chimelis was briefly called up by the San Francisco Giants in June 1995, but never appeared in an MLB game, making him a phantom ballplayer.

==== Had MLB experience before strike ====
- Shawn Abner
- Jay Aldrich
- Jose Alvarez
- Scott Anderson
- Bob Ayrault
- Mark Bailey
- Billy Bates
- Blaine Beatty
- Kevin Belcher
- Mike Bell
- Terry Blocker
- Danny Boone
- Pedro Borbón
- Oil Can Boyd
- Marty Bystrom
- Nick Capra
- Darrin Chapin
- Mike Christopher
- Marty Clary
- Stu Cole
- Doug Corbett
- Henry Cotto
- Todd Cruz
- Luis DeLeón
- Tom Dunbar
- Gary Eave
- Frank Eufemia
- Steve Fireovid
- John Fishel
- Curt Ford
- Alan Fowlkes
- Mike Fuentes
- Jay Gainer
- Jeff Grotewold
- Bert Heffernan
- Willie Hernández
- Kevin Hickey
- Keith Hughes
- James Hurst
- Mark Huismann
- Stan Jefferson
- Shawn Jeter
- Ed Jurak
- Steve Kiefer
- Garland Kiser
- Brent Knackert
- Brad Komminsk
- Randy Kramer
- Randy Kutcher
- Rick Lancellotti
- Ced Landrum
- Terry Lee
- Bill Lindsey
- Mitch Lyden
- Rick Lysander
- Lonnie Maclin
- Ever Magallanes
- Rob Mallicoat
- Paul Marak
- Greg Mathews
- Randy McCament
- Craig McMurtry
- José Mota
- Rob Nelson
- Ken Oberkfell
- Junior Ortiz
- Jim Paciorek
- Dave Pavlas
- Pat Perry
- Marty Pevey
- Gus Polidor
- Lenny Randle
- Rick Reed
- Nikco Riesgo
- Pat Rice
- George Riley
- Dave Rohde
- Wayne Rosenthal
- Rich Sauveur
- Jeff Schulz
- Nelson Simmons
- Doug Sisk
- Joe Slusarski
- Daryl Smith
- Greg Smith
- Ray Soff
- Matt Stark
- Bob Stoddard
- Phil Stephenson
- Glenn Sutko
- Lou Thornton
- Shane Turner
- Héctor Villanueva
- Dave Von Ohlen
- Dana Williams
- Mike Walker
- Mike Warren
- Robbie Wine
- Herm Winningham
- Matt Winters
- Eric Yelding

== 1912 Detroit Tigers strike ==
On May 15, 1912, Detroit Tigers star Ty Cobb went into the stands and assaulted a fan who had been heckling him. American League president Ban Johnson suspended Cobb, but other Tigers refused to play unless Cobb was reinstated. Johnson threatened Tigers owner Frank Navin with a stiff fine if he did not field a team. Thus, manager Hughie Jennings quickly recruited a pickup team of sandlot, semi-pro, and college baseball players.

This replacement team played one game, on May 18, after which the Tigers players relented and returned to play future games (under threat of lifetime banishment).

The following players appeared in the May 18 game, which the Tigers lost to the Philadelphia Athletics, 24–2.

- Ed Irwin
- Hughie Jennings
- Bill Leinhauser
- Billy Maharg
- Vincent Maney
- Jim McGarr
- Dan McGarvey
- Deacon McGuire
- Jack Smith
- Joe Sugden
- Allan Travers
- Hap Ward

Sugden and McGuire were Tigers coaches who had had long baseball careers. This game was their last major league appearance. Jennings was the Tigers manager; he also had had a long career and was later elected to the Baseball Hall of Fame. He appeared as pinch hitter in the ninth inning.

None of the other players ever appeared in another major league game before or after, except Maharg, who appeared in one other game as a courtesy in the last game of the 1916 season. He was later deeply involved in the Black Sox Scandal. Smith played two innings in the field but had no plate appearances and consequently no batting average. Irwin was the only recruit to have a hit; the Tigers coaches also each had one hit. Irwin had two triples, and so retired with a batting average of .667 and slugging percentage of 2.000. Travers's 24 runs allowed is still the American League record for a complete game.

Arthur "Bugs" Baer, who later went on to become a journalist and humorist, was a member of the Tigers, recruited as a backup bench player. He did not appear in the game.
