= Dann Bilardello =

American baseball player (born 1959)

- Catcher
- Born: May 26, 1959 (age 67); Santa Cruz, California, U.S.
- Batted: Right Threw: Right

MLB debut
- April 11, 1983, for the Cincinnati Reds

Last MLB appearance
- October 4, 1992, for the San Diego Padres

MLB statistics
- Batting average: .204
- Home runs: 18
- Runs batted in: 91
- Stats at Baseball Reference

Teams
- Cincinnati Reds (1983–1985); Montreal Expos (1986); Pittsburgh Pirates (1989–1990); San Diego Padres (1991–1992)

Dann James Bilardello (born May 26, 1959) is an American former Major League Baseball (MLB) catcher and former manager of the Palm Beach Cardinals of the Florida State League in the St. Louis Cardinals minor league system. A product of Cabrillo College in Aptos, California, Bilardello has managed Cardinals minor league affiliates since 2010.

Drafted by the Los Angeles Dodgers in the 1st round of the 1978 MLB amateur draft, Bilardello made his MLB début with the Cincinnati Reds on April 11, 1983. His rookie season was his best showing at the plate with a .238 batting average, nine home runs and 38 runs batted in in 109 games. The next season, his 41.5% caught stealing percentage led the National League. In 1985, he improved on that rate at 48.8% – catching 20 of 41 would-be base stealers – although this time he finished third. He was a poor hitter throughout his career as he received the most playing time in his rookie season. Playing in a total of eight MLB seasons, Bilardello appeared in his final game with the San Diego Padres on October 4, 1992. His minor league playing career spanned a total of 16 seasons from 1978 to 1994.

Following his playing career, Bilardello managed a different team in each of four seasons in the Los Angeles Dodgers minor league system from 2002–2005. All teams were between the rookie to advanced A-level. Later, he served as a roving instructor for the Cardinals. After being named the manager of the Cardinals Short Season A level New York–Penn League affiliate Batavia Muckdogs in 2010, Bilardello led the team to the Pinckney Division championship that season. He managed Batavia until 2012. He received a promotion in 2013 to take the same post with the Peoria Chiefs of the Midwest League A-ball. On November 7, 2013, the Cardinals again promoted Bilardello to guide the advanced A-level Palm Beach Cardinals of the Florida State League. He is currently the manager for the Tri-City Dust Devils, the High-A affiliate of the Los Angeles Angels.

== Personal life ==
Bilardello's son Davis was drafted in the 43rd round of the 2004 MLB draft.
