= Webster Garrison =

American baseball player

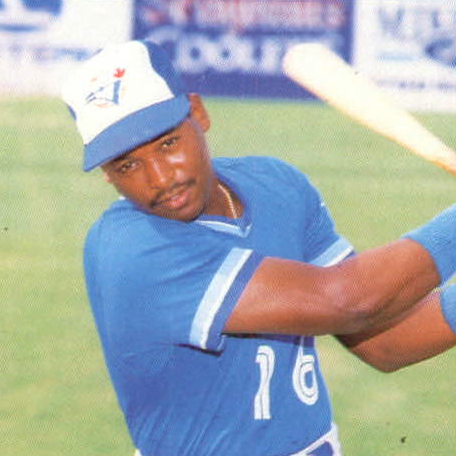
- Garrison with the Knoxville Blue Jays in 1988
- Infielder
- Born: August 24, 1965 (age 60); Marrero, Louisiana, U.S.
- Batted: Right Threw: Right

MLB debut
- August 2, 1996, for the Oakland Athletics

Last MLB appearance
- August 7, 1996, for the Oakland Athletics

MLB statistics
- Batting average: .000
- Home runs: 0
- Runs batted in: 0
- Stats at Baseball Reference

Teams
- Oakland Athletics (1996)

Webster "Webby" Leotis Garrison (born August 24, 1965) is an American former professional baseball infielder and coach and manager in the Oakland Athletics farm system. He played in five games for the Athletics in 1996 and worked as a coach or manager from 1999 to 2020.

== Playing career ==
Born in Marrero, Louisiana, Garrison attended John Ehret High School in Marrero. The Toronto Blue Jays drafted him in the second round of the 1983 MLB draft. He planned to attend the University of New Orleans but signed with the Blue Jays after the team increased its signing bonus offer. He reached Triple-A in 1989 but suffered several leg injuries in 1990, limiting him to 37 games. He joined the Oakland Athletics minor league system the following year, then the Colorado Rockies system in 1994. In 1995, Garrison was a replacement player with the Rockies in spring training during the ongoing strike. He played in the first game at Coors Field, hitting a two-run double in an exhibition game.

Garrison returned to the A's system in 1996. He played in the majors in five games in August that year. In 10 plate appearances, he had no hits and one walk. He continued to play in the minors through 1998. He started his coaching career in 1999, also playing in 43 Double-A games.

== Coaching career ==
Garrison began his coaching career in 1999 with the Athletics' Double-A Midland RockHounds. During the 1999 season in Midland, Garrison served as a player-coach, playing in 43 games while acting as the hitting coach for the team. From 2011 to 2013, he managed the Stockton Ports. He was named "Banner Island Ballpark All-Time Manager" in 2015. In 2015, he managed the Nashville Sounds and in 2016 and 2017, the Arizona League Athletics, before being promoted to manager of the Class A Beloit Snappers for 2018. In 2019, he returned to managing the Ports. In 2020, he was named the manager of the Arizona League Athletics in his 22nd year with the organization, but the minor league season was cancelled and he was hospitalized for much of the year.

== Personal life ==
Garrison married in July 2020. He was hospitalized with symptoms from COVID-19 in March 2020 and was married in a New Orleans, Louisiana hospital. His stepson, John Emery Jr., has played football for the LSU Tigers and UTSA Roadrunners.
