= Jeff Grotewold =

American baseball player (born 1965)

- Designated hitter / Pinch hitter
- Born: December 8, 1965 (age 60); Madera, California, U.S.
- Batted: Left Threw: Right

MLB debut
- April 12, 1992, for the Philadelphia Phillies

Last MLB appearance
- July 4, 1995, for the Kansas City Royals

MLB statistics
- Batting average: .228
- Hits: 23
- Home runs: 4
- Stats at Baseball Reference

Teams
- Philadelphia Phillies (1992); Kansas City Royals (1995)

Jeffrey Scott Grotewold (born December 8, 1965) is an American former professional baseball first baseman. He played in Major League Baseball (MLB) primarily as a pinch hitter and designated hitter for the Philadelphia Phillies and Kansas City Royals.

== Career ==
Grotewold attended the University of San Diego, where he played college baseball for the Toreros from 1984-1986.

Grotewold played for the Philadelphia Phillies for 72 games, primarily as a pinch hitter, during the 1992 season. In July of that year, he hit three pinch hit home runs on three consecutive days, but in the course of four pinch hit appearances as one of these days saw a double header. Before the 1995 season, he was a replacement player in spring training for the Kansas City Royals during the ongoing strike. He also played in 15 games for the Royals that season. He played for the Triple-A Omaha Royals in 1996, his final professional season.
