= Joe Millette =

American baseball player (born 1965)

- Shortstop
- Born: August 12, 1965 (age 60); Walnut Creek, California, U.S.
- Batted: Right Threw: Right

MLB debut
- July 16, 1992, for the Philadelphia Phillies

Last MLB appearance
- June 27, 1993, for the Philadelphia Phillies

MLB statistics
- Batting average: .205
- Home runs: 0
- Runs batted in: 4
- Stats at Baseball Reference

Teams
- Philadelphia Phillies (1992–1993)

Joseph Anthony Millette (born August 12, 1965) is an American former shortstop in Major League Baseball. He played for the Philadelphia Phillies.

Millette attended Acalanes High School in Lafayette, California. Millette played college baseball at Diablo Valley College and Saint Mary's College of California but was not selected in the 1988 Major League Baseball draft. He attended multiple open tryouts in California before taking a job with the Chevron Corporation. In September 1988, he signed a contract with the Philadelphia Phillies and left his higher-paying job at Chevron.
