= Cliff Brantley =

American baseball player (born 1968)

- Pitcher
- Born: April 12, 1968 (age 56); Staten Island, New York, U.S.
- Batted: Right Threw: Right

MLB debut
- September 3, 1991, for the Philadelphia Phillies

Last MLB appearance
- September 28, 1992, for the Philadelphia Phillies

MLB statistics
- Win–loss record: 4–8
- Earned run average: 4.25
- Strikeouts: 57
- Stats at Baseball Reference

Teams
- Philadelphia Phillies (1991–1992)

Clifford "Cliff" Brantley (born April 12, 1968) is an American former professional baseball pitcher, who played in Major League Baseball (MLB) for the Philadelphia Phillies in 1991 and 1992. In 34 career big league games, he had a 4–8 record with a 4.25 earned run average (ERA). Brantley batted and threw right-handed.

Brantley's father, Cleophas, was a star football player in Mississippi and New York Police Department officer and his mother, Margaret, was a star basketball player in North Carolina. Brantley starred in baseball and basketball at Port Richmond High School in Staten Island. He accepted an athletic scholarship to attend Michigan but chose to forego his commitment in favor of playing professional baseball.

Brantley was drafted by the Phillies in the 2nd round of the 1986 Major League Baseball draft.

Brantley's son, also named Cliff, played college baseball for Wagner and Adelphi before playing several years of minor league baseball.
