= Kyle Abbott (baseball) =

American baseball player (born 1968)

- Pitcher
- Born: February 18, 1968 (age 57); Newburyport, Massachusetts, U.S.
- Batted: Left Threw: Left

Professional debut
- MLB: September 10, 1991, for the California Angels
- NPB: April 20, 1994, for the Kintetsu Buffaloes

Last appearance
- NPB: August 4, 1994, for the Kintetsu Buffaloes
- MLB: August 24, 1996, for the California Angels

MLB statistics
- Win–loss record: 4–17
- Earned run average: 5.20
- Strikeouts: 124

NPB statistics
- Win–loss record: 0–0
- Earned run average: 7.71
- Strikeouts: 8
- Stats at Baseball Reference

Teams
- California Angels (1991); Philadelphia Phillies (1992); Kintetsu Buffaloes (1994); Philadelphia Phillies (1995); California Angels (1996)

Lawrence Kyle Abbott (born February 18, 1968) is an American former professional baseball pitcher. In a five-year career, Abbott played four seasons in Major League Baseball (MLB) for the California Angels and Philadelphia Phillies, as well as one season for the Kintetsu Buffaloes of Nippon Professional Baseball (NPB). He was officially listed as standing 6 feet 4 inches (193 cm) and weighing 200 pounds (91 kg).

== Early life ==
Abbott was born in Newburyport, Massachusetts. Abbott attended high school at Mission Viejo High School in Mission Viejo, California, before attending college at University of California, San Diego from 1987 until 1988. Abbott transferred to California State University, Long Beach in 1989, where he led his team to the College World Series for the first time in team history.

== Career ==
Abbott began his baseball career with the California Angels, who drafted Abbott with the ninth pick of the 1989 Major League Baseball draft. After signing with the Angels, Abbot played the 1989 season for the Quad Cities Angels, a minor league affiliate of the Angels. In 73 2/3 innings pitched, Abbott recorded five wins and four losses with an earned run average (ERA) of 2.57. Baseball America ranked Abbott as the 60th-best minor league prospect for the 1990 season.

In 1990, Abbott continued his career, playing for two minor league teams: the Edmonton Trappers of the Pacific Coast League and the Midland Angels of the Texas League. In his time with the Edmonton Trappers, Abbott recorded the worst earned run average on the team, with an ERA of 14.81, over 10 1/3 innings pitched. After pitching in three games for the Trappers, Abbott was demoted to the double-A Midland Angels. Abbott finished the season tied for second in most wins on the team, while leading the team in losses and walks allowed. Baseball America ranked Abbott as the eighty-fourth best prospect for the 1991 season.

Abbot began the 1991 season playing for the Trappers. Abbott recorded team highs in wins, losses, and innings pitched, leading Abbott to make his Major League debut for the California Angels on September 10, 1991, in a game against the Texas Rangers. For his debut, Abbot served as a starting pitcher, allowing two earned runs in six innings pitched. Abbott finished the 1991 season with a 1–2 win–loss record and an ERA of 4.58.

In the 1991 offseason, the Angels traded Abbott and Rubén Amaro, Jr. to the Philadelphia Phillies for outfielder Von Hayes.

Abbott spent the first seven games of the 1992 season with the Philadelphia Phillies, recording an 0–7 record before being demoted to the minor league Scranton/Wilkes-Barre Red Barons. After posting an ERA of 1.54 over 35 innings pitched, Abbott was promoted to the Major Leagues, finishing the MLB season with a 1–14 record while allowing eighty runs over 133 1/3 innings pitched. Abbott finished the season tied for third in the National League for most losses, while tying for eighth in most wild pitches thrown.

Abbott pitched the 1993 season for the Red Barons, leading his team in wins, innings pitched, and hits allowed. Later that year, on November 24, 1993, Abbott was released by the Philadelphia Phillies before playing for the Kintetsu Buffaloes of the Japan Pacific League in 1994. Abbott helped the Buffaloes to a 68–59 record while the Buffaloes finished fourth in their division.

On December 6, 1994, Abbott signed a contract valued at $150,000 with the Phillies. Abbott spent the entire 1995 season in the Major Leagues, recording a 3.81 ERA while allowing sixteen walks with twenty-one strikeouts. Abbott was granted free agency on October 16, 1995.

In his last major league season, Abbott played for the Angels, signing with the team on May 29, 1996. Abbott began the year with the Midland Angels, but was promoted to the California Angels when Mark Langston was placed on the fifteen-day disabled list. Abbott finished the major league year with a 20.25 ERA in 4 innings pitched.
