= Charlie Hayes =

American baseball player (born 1965)

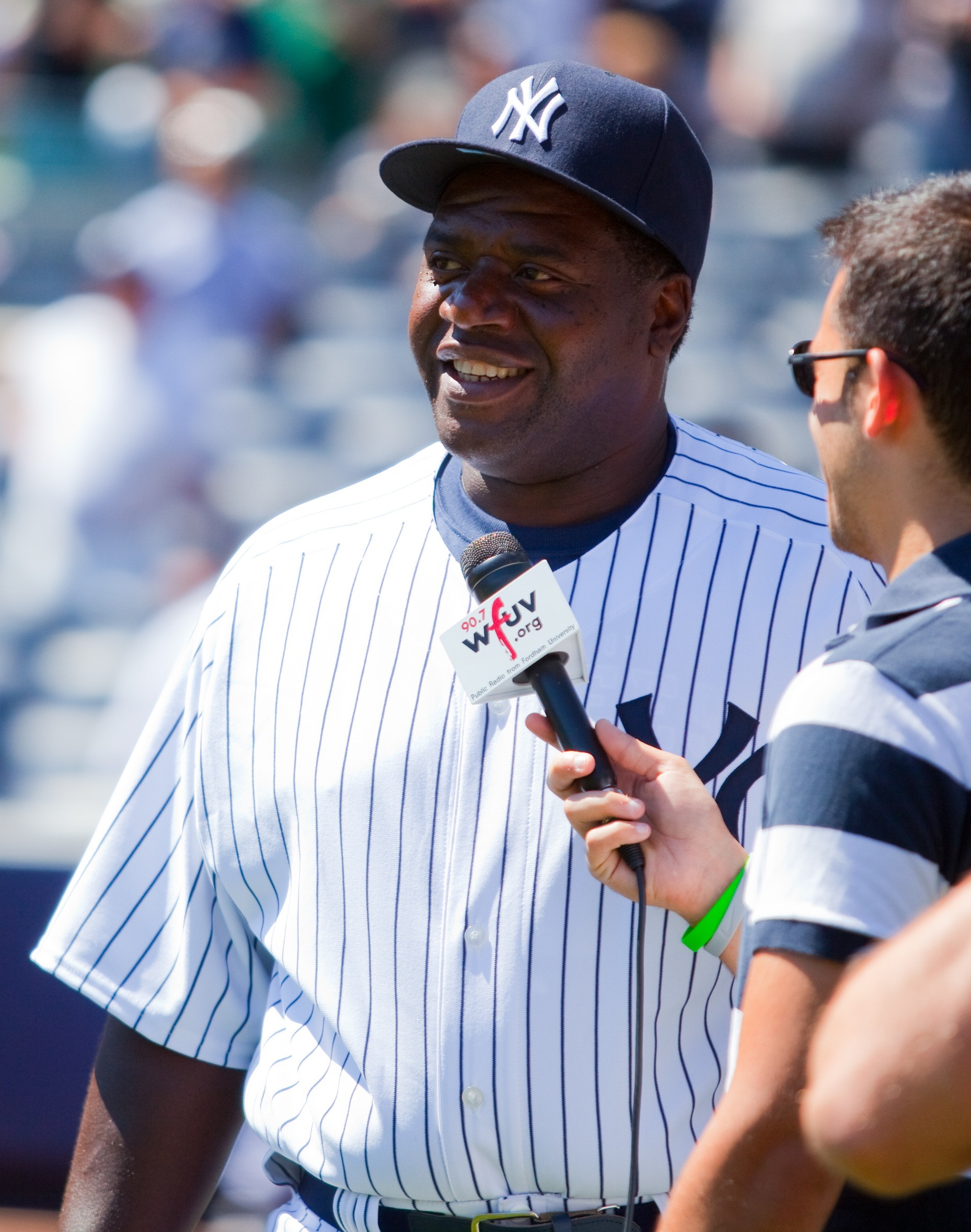
- Hayes at the 2009 Yankees' Old-Timers' Day
- Third baseman
- Born: May 29, 1965 (age 61); Hattiesburg, Mississippi, U.S.
- Batted: Right Threw: Right

MLB debut
- September 11, 1988, for the San Francisco Giants

Last MLB appearance
- June 27, 2001, for the Houston Astros

MLB statistics
- Batting average: .262
- Home runs: 144
- Runs batted in: 740
- Stats at Baseball Reference

Teams
- San Francisco Giants (1988–1989); Philadelphia Phillies (1989–1991); New York Yankees (1992); Colorado Rockies (1993–1994); Philadelphia Phillies (1995); Pittsburgh Pirates (1996); New York Yankees (1996–1997); San Francisco Giants (1998–1999); Milwaukee Brewers (2000); Houston Astros (2001)

Career highlights and awards
- World Series champion (1996)

Charles Dewayne Hayes (born May 29, 1965) is an American former professional baseball third baseman and former coach for the Florida Complex League Phillies. Hayes played in Major League Baseball for the San Francisco Giants, Philadelphia Phillies, New York Yankees, Colorado Rockies, Pittsburgh Pirates, Milwaukee Brewers, and Houston Astros from 1988 through 2001. He was a member of the Yankees' 1996 World Series championship team that beat the Atlanta Braves. He batted and threw right-handed.

== Amateur career ==
Hayes played for the South Region champions (Hub City from Hattiesburg, Mississippi) in the first round of the 1977 Little League World Series. He attended Forrest County Agricultural High School in Brooklyn, Mississippi.

== Professional career ==
=== San Francisco Giants (1988–1989) ===
The San Francisco Giants selected Hayes in the fourth round of the 1983 Major League Baseball draft. He made his MLB debut with the Giants on September 11, 1988, where he hit .091 over seven games.

=== Philadelphia Phillies (1989–1991) ===
On June 18, 1989, the Giants traded Hayes with Dennis Cook and Terry Mulholland to the Philadelphia Phillies for Steve Bedrosian and a player to be named later, who turned out to be Rick Parker. On August 15, 1990, he was a decisive part of a unique baseball game. While Mulholland pitched a no-hitter (not giving up a single hit, walking, or hitting a batsman, and retired every opposing player he faced), Parker reached base on a throwing error by Hayes, spoiling an otherwise perfect game. Hayes later redeemed himself, however, by snaring Gary Carter's line drive for the final out of the 9th inning and thus preserving Mulholland's no-hitter.

=== New York Yankees (1992) ===
Before the 1992 season, the Phillies sent Hayes to the New York Yankees to complete a trade made on January 8, 1992, in which the Phillies acquired Darrin Chapin from the Yankees for a player to be named later. He hit .257 with a career-high 100 strikeouts.

After the 1992 season, the Colorado Rockies selected Hayes from the Yankees as the third pick in the 1992 MLB expansion draft. The Yankees attempted to revoke Hayes' assignment to the Rockies, charging that the Florida Marlins were not properly compensating the Yankees for lost territory in Fort Lauderdale, Florida, where the Yankees had a minor league team. The Commissioner of Baseball at the time, Bud Selig rejected the claim, and Hayes joined the Rockies.

=== Colorado Rockies (1993–1994) ===
Hayes was part of the inaugural Rockies team in 1993 and played third base during their first ever game. During the season, he compiled a career-high 45 doubles (leading the National League), 25 home runs, and 98 runs batted in. In 1994, he compiled 23 doubles and 50 runs batted in before the 1994–95 MLB strike ended the season. He was granted free agency on December 23.

=== Philadelphia Phillies (1995) ===
Hayes signed with the Philadelphia Phillies for the 1995 season, where he hit 11 home runs and 85 RBI. He became a free agent after the 1995 season.

=== Pittsburgh Pirates & New York Yankees (1996–1997) ===
Hayes signed a four-year contract with the Pittsburgh Pirates. With the Pirates, he hit .248 over 128 games to begin the season.

On August 30, 1996, the Pirates traded Hayes to the New York Yankees for a player to be named later, later choosing Chris Corn.

Hayes hit .284 over 20 games for the Yankees during the season and was added to the postseason roster. He appeared in three games during the 1996 American League Division Series against the Texas Rangers and was one for seven with a run batted in. During the 1996 American League Championship Series against the Baltimore Orioles, Hayes played in four games and went one for seven with two walks. Hayes played in five of the six games in the 1996 World Series against the Atlanta Braves, collecting three hits and one run batted in, along with five strikeouts. Hayes scored the only run for either team in Game 5 of the series, crossing home plate in the top of the 4th inning via a double by Cecil Fielder. In Game 6 of the 1996 World Series, he caught Mark Lemke's pop up in foul territory behind third base to end the game and give the Yankees their first World Series championship since 1978.

Hayes hit .258 over 100 games for the Yankees in 1997, including 53 runs batted in and 40 walks. In the 1997 American League Division Series against the Cleveland Indians, he went 5 for 15 with one run batted in. After the series, the Yankees traded Hayes to the Giants for Alberto Castillo and Chris Singleton.

=== San Francisco Giants (1998–1999) ===
In 1998, Hayes played in 111 games and his batting average increased to .286 while hitting 12 home runs and driving in 62 runs. The next year, he saw his playing time decrease as he saw action in just 95 games, his lowest total since 1989. He finished the season with a dismal .205 average while collecting just 54 hits, then a career low.

=== Mets and Brewers (2000) ===
Hayes became a free agent again after the 1999 season, and he signed with the New York Mets on January 20, 2000. They released him during spring training, however, and he instead caught on with the Milwaukee Brewers for the 2000 season. During the season, he hit .251 while driving in 46 runs.

=== Houston Astros and retirement (2001) ===
Hayes signed with the Houston Astros for the 2001 season, but collected just 10 hits over 31 games (a .200 average) and was released on July 9.

In a 14-season career, Hayes posted a .262 batting average with 144 home runs and 740 RBI in 1,547 games played.

== Post-playing career ==
Hayes currently gives baseball lessons and operates a team along with a facility for the instruction of baseball, called "Big League Baseball Academy" in Tomball, Texas. On July 19, 2009, Hayes made his first appearance at the Yankees annual Old-Timers' Day. He returned to Old-Timers' Day again in 2010, 2011, 2012, 2013, and 2014.

Hayes rejoined the Philadelphia Phillies as a coach for the Phillies Triple-A Affiliate the Lehigh Valley IronPigs.

Hayes was named as a coach for the FCL Phillies for the 2018 and 2019 seasons.

== Personal life ==
Hayes is the father of major league third baseman Ke'Bryan Hayes and former minor league pitcher Tyree Hayes.

== See also ==
- List of Major League Baseball annual doubles leaders
- List of second-generation Major League Baseball players
