= Rubén Amaro Jr. =

American baseball player (born 1965)

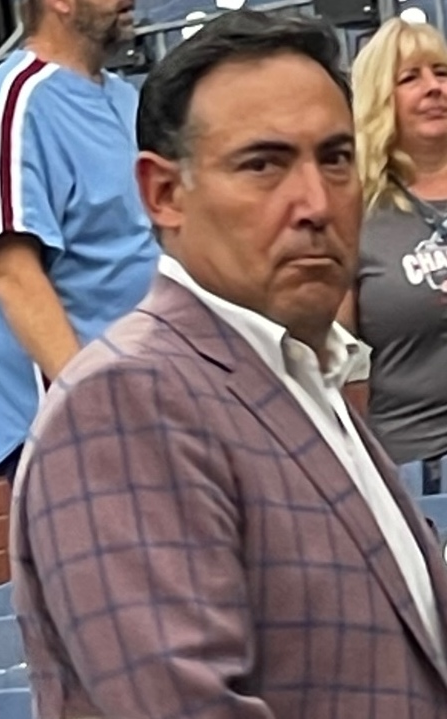
- Amaro Jr. in 2022
- Outfielder
- Born: February 12, 1965 (age 61); Philadelphia, Pennsylvania, U.S.
- Batted: Switch Threw: Right

MLB debut
- June 8, 1991, for the California Angels

Last MLB appearance
- September 27, 1998, for the Philadelphia Phillies

MLB statistics
- Batting average: .235
- Home runs: 16
- Runs batted in: 100
- Stats at Baseball Reference

Teams
- As player: California Angels (1991); Philadelphia Phillies (1992–1993); Cleveland Indians (1994–1995); Philadelphia Phillies (1996–1998); As general manager: Philadelphia Phillies (2009–2015); As coach: Boston Red Sox (2016–2017); New York Mets (2018)

Career highlights and awards
- World Series champion (2008)

Rubén Amaro Jr. (born February 12, 1965) is an American former professional baseball outfielder, coach and executive. Amaro played in Major League Baseball (MLB) from 1991 to 1998. He was named the GM of the Philadelphia Phillies on November 3, 2008, succeeding Pat Gillick and remained in that position until September 10, 2015. He was previously the first base coach for the Boston Red Sox (2016–2017) and New York Mets (2018). He is the son of former MLB infielder and coach, Rubén Amaro Sr. Amaro is currently a color commentator on Philadelphia Phillies television broadcasts and a contributor to the 94.1 WIP Morning Show in Philadelphia. He worked as an analyst for a 2024 AL Wild Card Series on ESPN Radio.

== Early life ==
Born and raised in the Rhawnhurst neighborhood of Northeast Philadelphia, Amaro played Little League Baseball for Crispin Gardens. Amaro is Jewish; his mother Judy Amaro-Perez (née Herman) is of Russian-Jewish heritage and his father was a Catholic Mexican-Cuban. He was the Phillies’ batboy from 1980 to 1983 when his father, Rubén Amaro Sr., was their first base coach.

Amaro graduated from William Penn Charter School in 1983, where he played baseball and soccer. He graduated from Stanford University in 1987. In 1985 and 1986, he played collegiate summer baseball with the Cotuit Kettleers of the Cape Cod Baseball League and was named an all-star both seasons. He was a member of the Stanford team that won the NCAA 1987 College World Series. He led the team in runs (77), triples (6), and stolen bases (38) that year.

== Baseball playing career ==
=== Minor leagues ===
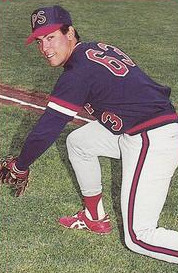
Amaro in 1988 with the Palm Springs Angels

Drafted by the California Angels in the 11th round of the 1987 amateur draft, he signed June 16, 1987.

In 1989 he began the season by batting .360 for Quad Cities of the Midwest League, and then ended it by hitting .382 for the Midland of the Texas League. In 1990 he batted .317 between AA and AAA. He followed that by batting .326 in 1991 in AAA. In 3,117 at bats in the minor leagues, he batted .301 with a .399 on-base percentage and 235 stolen bases.

=== Major leagues ===
He debuted in the major leagues on June 8, 1991. On December 8, 1991, he was traded by the Angels with Kyle Abbott to the Philadelphia Phillies for Von Hayes.

In 1992 he finished third in the NL with 9 hits-by-pitch. On November 2, 1993, he was traded by the Phillies to the Cleveland Indians for Heathcliff Slocumb.

Amaro made the Cleveland Indians World Series roster in 1995 over Dave Winfield. On November 9, 1995, he was released by the Indians.

On January 24, 1996, he was signed as a free agent by the Toronto Blue Jays. On May 5, 1996, he was released by the Blue Jays, and the following day he signed as a free agent with the Phillies. He batted .313 for the Phillies that year with a .380 on-base percentage.

In eight seasons in the major leagues, Amaro appeared in 485 games, batting .235 with 16 home runs and 100 RBIs. He played for both the 1993 NL champion Phillies and the 1995 AL champion Indians.

== Post-playing career ==
=== Front office positions ===
Amaro joined the Phillies front office immediately after his playing career ended in 1998, hired by then-GM Ed Wade. He served as assistant GM for the Phillies for 10 seasons, before being named GM. His first seven seasons were under Wade, followed by three under Gillick.

On November 1, 2008, the day after the Phillies’ second-ever Broad Street Parade, it was confirmed that Amaro was given a three-year contract to be the new Phillies GM, as well as senior vice-president.

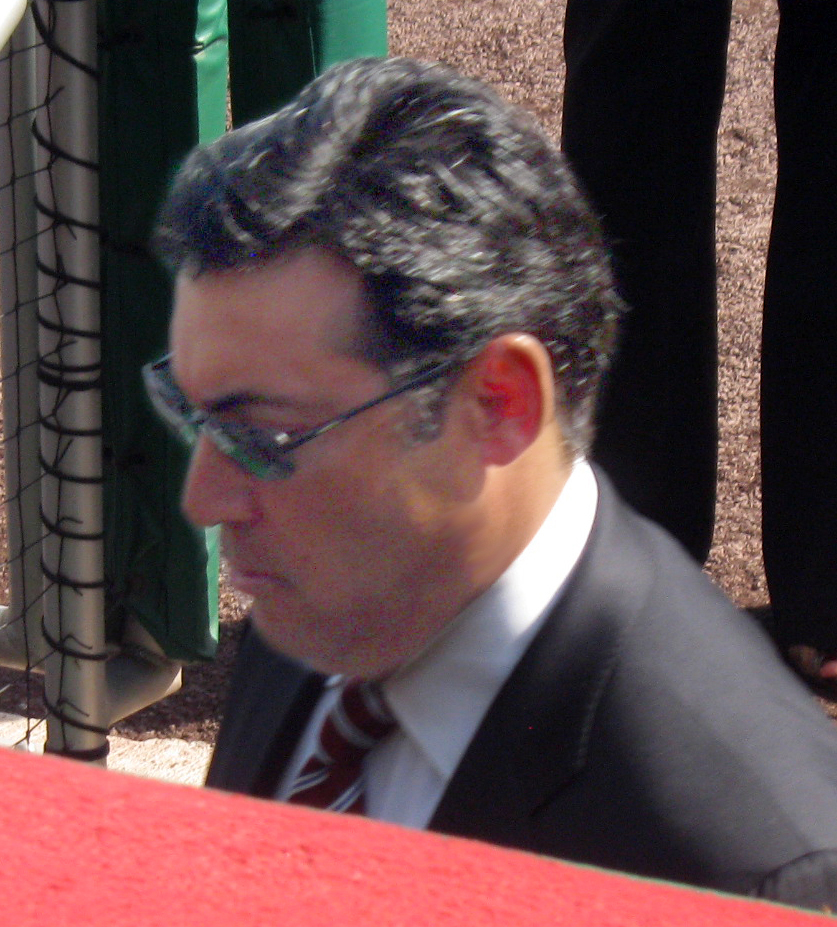
Amaro in April 2010

The Phillies won the National League East divisional title each of the first three years of Amaro's tenure, appearing in the 2009 World Series and finishing with the best record in baseball during the 2010 and 2011 regular seasons (the latter, with 102 wins, their best record in franchise history). In 2009, with the Phillies pitchers struggling despite being the defending World Series title holders, he traded for Cliff Lee and signed free agent Pedro Martinez, who contributed to the Phillies' return run to the World Series. In 2010, Amaro traded for Roy Halladay but also dealt away Lee. In late July, when the Phillies were 3 1/2 games behind the Atlanta Braves, he pulled off yet another crafty trade, acquiring Roy Oswalt and "triggering a late-season blitz to baseball's best record." Prior to the 2011 season, Amaro managed to convince Lee – then a free agent courting interest from the Texas Rangers and New York Yankees – to re-sign with the Phillies, joining a pitching rotation consisting of Halladay, Oswalt, Cole Hamels, and Joe Blanton. Commentators called it one of the best rotations ever assembled. Halladay, Oswalt, Lee, and Hamels were dubbed the 'Phantastic Phour' by fans and the media. However, Amaro was criticized for giving a US$125 million 5-year contract extension to an already-ailing Ryan Howard in 2010, which was regarded as highly unnecessary, because Howard was already signed through to the end of the 2011 season – by which time he would be 32 years old, which is "about the age at which teams start to worry about decline in big-bodied first-base/DH types."

Further, the latter part of Amaro's tenure as GM was comparatively unsuccessful, as Philadelphia failed to reach the postseason in 2012 and subsequent seasons. Howard's performance ended up far worse than skeptics expected, and by 2014 Amaro was "trying hard to deal Howard away, expressing a willingness to eat a lot of the money.” Shortly after Amaro fired manager Charlie Manuel, in 2013, Manuel admitted that he had known that the Phillies roster lacked enough "pieces to win" in 2012 and 2013. In July 2014, a "Stay Or Go" poll was conducted by Philly.com with over 10,000 fans involved, and 93.6% of voters wanted Amaro to be removed from his position, with only 6.4% wanting Amaro to remain GM.

Amaro's performance with the Phillies was unlike that of his predecessor; in May 2014, Sporting News ranked Amaro the worst general manager in MLB, noting his propensity to signing aging veterans who fail to perform at a level commensurate with their contracts. With the writing clearly on the wall for some time, Amaro was let go by the Phillies on September 10, 2015.

=== Coaching career ===
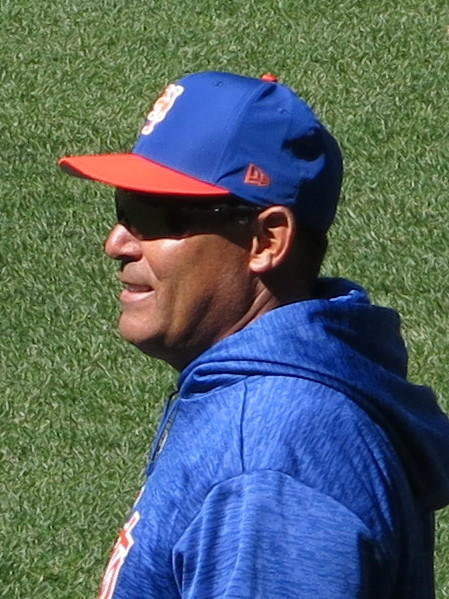
Amaro with the Mets in 2018

Amaro was hired as first base coach by the Red Sox for the 2016 season, returning to the field for the first time since retiring as a player. Following the 2017 season, he was named the Mets’ first base coach under new manager Mickey Callaway. He was then a special assistant to general manager Brodie Van Wagenen.

Following the 2018 season, the Mets promoted Amaro from the coaching ranks into a front-office advisory role, under new GM Brodie Van Wagenen.

=== Media analyst ===
In 2020, he was hired as a pre-game and post-game television analyst for NBC Sports Philadelphia, covering the Phillies. He also does color commentary for some games. Amaro, Jr. was hired in 2021 as an analyst for the MLB Network. Additionally, he is a regular contributor on 94WIP Sports Radio in Philadelphia. He has a podcast along with writers, Todd Zolecki and Jim Salisbury, called The Phillies Show.

== Honors and awards ==
In 2008, Amaro was one of three people inducted into the All-American Amateur Baseball Association Hall of Fame.

In 2009, Amaro was inducted into the Philadelphia Jewish Sports Hall of Fame.

That same year, baseball fans nationwide voted him the MLB "This Year in Baseball Awards" 2009 Executive of the Year.

Also in 2009, the Philadelphia Sports Writers Association (PSWA) named him its Executive of the Year.

== Philanthropy ==
Amaro is co-founder of the Richie Ashburn Harry Kalas Foundation, which provides baseball camps for underprivileged children in the Philadelphia metropolitan area. He also serves on the local YMCA board in Philadelphia.

== In popular culture ==
A teenage Amaro (portrayed by Niko Guardado, son of Major League baseball player, Eddie Guardado) was a recurring minor character in the ABC series The Goldbergs, which is set in the 1980s. Amaro attended the same school as television and film producer Adam F. Goldberg, on whose adolescence the show is based. Amaro portrayed his own father in Season 5, Episode 11 and reprised the role in Season 6, Episode 6.

== See also ==
- List of Jewish Major League Baseball players
- List of second-generation Major League Baseball players

Sporting positions
Preceded by Arnie Beyeler	Boston Red Sox first base coach 2016–2017	Succeeded by Tom Goodwin
Preceded by Tom Goodwin	New York Mets first base coach 2018	Succeeded by Glenn Sherlock
