= Tom Marsh (baseball) =

American baseball player

- Outfielder
- Born: December 27, 1965 (age 60); Toledo, Ohio, U.S.
- Batted: Right Threw: Right

MLB debut
- June 5, 1992, for the Philadelphia Phillies

Last MLB appearance
- September 29, 1995, for the Philadelphia Phillies

MLB statistics
- Games played: 93
- Batting average: .246
- Runs scored: 23
- Stats at Baseball Reference

Teams
- Philadelphia Phillies (1992, 1994–1995)

Thomas Owen Marsh (born December 27, 1965) is an American former Major League Baseball player. Marsh played high school baseball at Woodward High School in Toledo. He played college baseball at the University of Toledo from 1985 to 1988. He was drafted by Philadelphia in the 16th round of the 1988 MLB draft and made his Major League Baseball debut in 1992 for the Philadelphia Phillies. Marsh only played for parts of three seasons in MLB baseball — all with the Phillies — in 1992, 1994, and 1995. He was involved in a serious on-field injury during a game in 1995. Due to the seriousness of the matter, ESPNs Baseball Tonight devoted much of its program that evening to Marsh's injury.
