= Joe Vitko =

American baseball player (born 1970)

- Pitcher
- Born: February 1, 1970 (age 55); Somerville, New Jersey, U.S.
- Batted: Right Threw: Right

MLB debut
- September 18, 1992, for the New York Mets

Last MLB appearance
- September 28, 1992, for the New York Mets

MLB statistics
- Win–loss record: 0–1
- Earned run average: 13.50
- Strikeouts: 6
- Stats at Baseball Reference

Teams
- New York Mets (1992)

Joseph John Vitko (born February 1, 1970) is a former Major League Baseball pitcher who played for one season. He pitched in three games for the New York Mets during the 1992 New York Mets season.
