= Mike Hartley (baseball) =

American baseball player (born 1961)

- Pitcher
- Born: August 31, 1961 (age 64); Hawthorne, California, U.S.
- Batted: Right Threw: Right

MLB debut
- September 10, 1989, for the Los Angeles Dodgers

Last MLB appearance
- September 24, 1995, for the Baltimore Orioles

MLB statistics
- Win–loss record: 19–13
- Earned run average: 3.70
- Strikeouts: 259

NPB statistics
- Win–loss record: 1–6
- Earned run average: 6.69
- Strikeouts: 27
- Stats at Baseball Reference

Teams
- Los Angeles Dodgers (1989–1991); Philadelphia Phillies (1991–1992); Minnesota Twins (1993); Chiba Lotte Marines (1994); Boston Red Sox (1995); Baltimore Orioles (1995)

Michael Edward Hartley (born August 31, 1961) is an American former professional baseball right-handed pitcher who played in Major League Baseball (MLB) from 1989 to 1995.

Signed as an amateur free agent by the St. Louis Cardinals in 1981, Hartley would make his MLB debut with the Los Angeles Dodgers on September 10, 1989, and appear in his final big league game on September 24, 1995. In 1994, he pitched in Japan for the Chiba Lotte Marines of Nippon Professional Baseball (NPB).

From 2005 to 2007, Hartley was a pitching coach for the independent Reno Silver Sox. From 2008 to 2010, he was the head coach for the Heidenheim Heideköpfe a German first league team. Hartley lead the team to become the 2009 German National Champions. In 2010, Heidekoepfe finished 2nd in the Final Four European Championship. In 2011, Hartley became the head coach for the Croatian National Team and won the European Championship Qualifier. In 2012, he became the head coach of Grosseto Baseball in the Italian Baseball League.
