= Jeff Gardner =

American baseball player (born 1964)

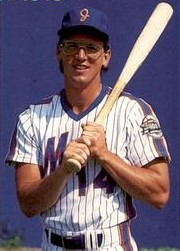
- Second baseman
- Born: February 4, 1964 (age 62); Newport Beach, California, U.S.
- Batted: Left Threw: Right

MLB debut
- September 10, 1991, for the New York Mets

Last MLB appearance
- May 4, 1994, for the Montreal Expos

MLB statistics
- Batting average: .246
- Home runs: 1
- Runs batted in: 26
- Stats at Baseball Reference

Teams
- New York Mets (1991); San Diego Padres (1992–1993); Montreal Expos (1994)

Jeffrey Scott Gardner (born February 4, 1964) is an American former Major League Baseball infielder. He is the current manager for the Reno Aces, the Triple-A affiliate of the Arizona Diamondbacks. He was the starting second baseman for the San Diego Padres in 1993, and played parts of three other seasons for the Padres, New York Mets, and Montreal Expos. After his playing career, Gardner was a manager in the Padres' minor league system from 2001 until 2003.

Gardner attended Orange Coast College. In 1984 he played collegiate summer baseball with the Harwich Mariners of the Cape Cod Baseball League and was named a league all-star. He was selected by the Houston Astros in the 14th round of the 1984 MLB draft.

In 2014, he was listed as a member of the Arizona Diamondbacks' professional scouting staff, based in Costa Mesa, California.

In 2025, he was named as the manager of the Reno Aces the Triple-A affiliate of the Arizona Diamondbacks.
