= Brad Brink =

American baseball player (born 1965)

- Pitcher
- Born: January 20, 1965 (age 60); Roseville, California, U.S.
- Batted: Right Threw: Right

MLB debut
- May 17, 1992, for the Philadelphia Phillies

Last MLB appearance
- July 19, 1994, for the San Francisco Giants

MLB statistics
- Win–loss record: 0–4
- Earned run average: 3.56
- Strikeouts: 27
- Stats at Baseball Reference

Teams
- Philadelphia Phillies (1992–1993); San Francisco Giants (1994)
Medals
Men's baseball
Representing United States
World Junior Baseball Championship
Silver medal – second place	1983 Johnstown	Team

Bradford Albert Brink (born January 20, 1965) is an American former professional baseball pitcher, who played in Major League Baseball (MLB) for the Philadelphia Phillies and San Francisco Giants (1992–1994). He attended the University of Southern California (USC).

== Career ==
Brink attended Thomas Downey High School in Modesto, California. He was drafted in the first round (7th overall) of the 1986 Major League Baseball draft, by the Phillies. After 2-plus seasons with Philadelphia, he finished his big league career with the 1994 Giants. Brink's overall statistical totals include a win–loss record of 0–4, with an earned run average (ERA) of 3.56, and 27 strikeouts.
