= Darrin Chapin =

American baseball player (born 1966)

- Pitcher
- Born: February 1, 1966 (age 60); Warren, Ohio, U.S.
- Batted: Right Threw: Right

MLB debut
- September 21, 1991, for the New York Yankees

Last MLB appearance
- April 27, 1992, for the Philadelphia Phillies

MLB statistics
- Win–loss record: 0–1
- Earned run average: 6.14
- Strikeouts: 6
- Stats at Baseball Reference

Teams
- New York Yankees (1991); Philadelphia Phillies (1992)

Darrin John Chapin (born February 1, 1966) is an American former professional baseball relief pitcher, who played in Major League Baseball (MLB) during the 1991 and 1992 seasons.

== Career ==
Chapin attended Champion High School, where he lettered three years in both football and basketball before graduating in 1984. He was an outstanding quarterback for the Golden Flashes football team and still holds the single-game passing record of 279 yards. As a basketball point guard, he averaged 11 points and 7 assists per game. Additionally, he lettered all four years in baseball. While pitching for the Flashes, he led his team to three league championships and received All-Ohio honors in baseball in his senior year. He is the only Champion High School alumni to play in Major League Baseball (MLB).

Chapin then attended Cuyahoga Community College in Cleveland, Ohio, where he played for the Tri-C's Baseball team. He then enrolled at Cleveland State University in Ohio and was a member of the Vikings baseball team in 1985, joining Dale Mohorcic as the only players to play for the Tri-C's, Vikings, and MLB.

The New York Yankees selected Chapin in the sixth round of the 1986 MLB draft out of Cuyahoga Community College. He spent six years in the organization from 1986 to 1991, which included a brief stint with the big club in 1991. Chapin made three relief appearances for the Yankees and lost a decision, allowing three earned runs on three hits and six walks while striking out five in 5 1/3 innings of work.

In 1992, the Yankees traded Chapin to the Philadelphia Phillies for infielder Charlie Hayes. Chapin pitched two innings of relief in his only appearance for the Phillies, giving up three earned runs on two hits, and struck out a batter without walks. Overall, he posted a 0–1 record and a 6.14 ERA with six strikeouts and six walks in 7 1/3 innings.

Besides the Yankees and Phillies, Chapin played for the Minnesota Twins, Florida Marlins, and Cleveland in their minor league systems. In ten seasons from 1986 to 1995, he went 40–28 with a 3.48 ERA and 15 saves in 367 minor league games. In 1995, he was a replacement player during the ongoing strike for Cleveland during spring training. He also pitched with the Broncos de Reynosa of the Mexican League in 1995, going 1–1 with a 1.48 ERA and three saves in 11 games.

Chapin played winter ball with the Navegantes del Magallanes, Tigres de Aragua, and Leones del Caracas clubs of the Venezuelan League in three off seasons, from 1990 to 1993. He had an overall record of 7–3 with a 3.92 ERA and seven saves in 38 pitching appearances, including seven as a starter.

Chapin was inducted into the Champion Athletic Hall of Fame in 2004. He lives in his native Warren with his wife, Liz. They have five children.
