= Jeff Innis =

American baseball player (1962–2022)

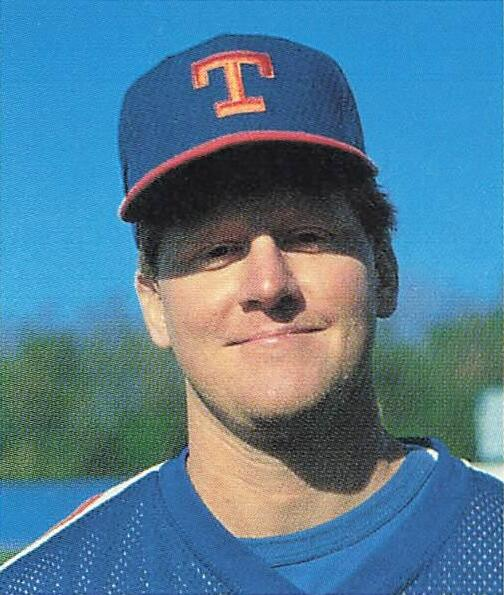
- Innis with the Tidewater Tides c. 1988
- Pitcher
- Born: July 5, 1962; Decatur, Illinois, U.S.
- Died: January 30, 2022 (aged 59); Dawsonville, Georgia, U.S.
- Batted: Right Threw: Right

MLB debut
- May 16, 1987, for the New York Mets

Last MLB appearance
- October 2, 1993, for the New York Mets

MLB statistics
- Win–loss record: 10–20
- Earned run average: 3.05
- Strikeouts: 192
- Stats at Baseball Reference

Teams
- New York Mets (1987–1993)

Jeffrey David Innis (July 5, 1962 – January 30, 2022) was an American baseball pitcher who played seven seasons in Major League Baseball (MLB). Nicknamed "I-Man", he played for the New York Mets from 1987 to 1993. He batted and threw right-handed.

== Early life ==
Innis was born in Decatur, Illinois, on July 5, 1962. He was one of two children of Peter Innis and June (Enos), who both worked as teachers. Innis attended Eisenhower High School in his hometown. He went on to study at the University of Illinois Urbana-Champaign and earned a psychology degree.

== Amateur career ==
Innis played collegiate summer baseball for the Cotuit Kettleers of the Cape Cod Baseball League (CCBL) in 1981 and 1982. He led the league in saves and was a league all-star in both seasons, winning the league title with the Kettleers in 1981. He was subsequently drafted by the New York Mets in the thirteenth round of the 1983 Major League Baseball draft. Innis was later inducted into the CCBL Hall of Fame in 2008.

== Professional career ==
Innis played five seasons in the minor leagues from 1983 to 1987. He made his MLB debut on May 16, 1987, at the age of 24, pitching two innings, striking out three, and being the losing pitcher in a 5–4 defeat to the San Francisco Giants. He also made the only start of his major league career on May 26 that year, receiving a no decision after surrendering two earned runs over four innings against the Giants. He subsequently posted a 3.16 earned run average (ERA) and 28 strikeouts over 25 2/3 innings pitched in his first MLB season.

Innis pitched in only 12 games in 1988 before being sent down to the minor leagues. However, he posted a career-best 1.89 ERA in the majors that year, and was credited with his first major league win on June 4 against the Chicago Cubs. He started the 1989 season with the Tidewater Tides and remained there until June, when Terry Leach was traded to the Kansas City Royals. Innis finished the year with a 3.18 ERA and 16 strikeouts over 39 2/3 innings. He was limited to three games pitched in April of the following year before being sent back to Tidewater. He was eventually promoted back to the major league roster in June and collected his first major league save on June 29 against the Cincinnati Reds. During the 1991 season, he compiled a 0–2 win–loss record along with a 2.66 ERA and a career-high 47 strikeouts in 84 2/3 innings. He finished ninth in the National League (NL) in games pitched (69), and became the first major league pitcher to appear in 60 games without recording a win or a save. This ironically factored against him during salary arbitration at the end of the season. Innis had a 6–9 record, a 2.86 ERA and 39 strikeouts in a career-high 88 innings pitched in 1992. He set a franchise record of 76 games pitched, and finished fifth in the league in games pitched and sixth in hit by pitch (6).

Innis played his final major league game on October 2, 1993, at the age of 31. In a seven-season career, he posted a 10–20 win–loss record with a 3.05 ERA in 288 games pitched. At the time of his death, Innis's 288 games pitched for the franchise was twelfth all-time.

== Personal life ==
Innis married Kelly McNee on November 21, 1992. They met while they were studying at the University of Illinois, where she was an All-America cross-country and indoor-track runner. Together, they had two children: Keenan and Shannon. They divorced in around 2005, but remained on friendly terms.

After retiring from professional baseball, Innis relocated to Cumming, Georgia. It was reported in January 2022 that Innis was dying of cancer and that he was receiving treatment at the University of Texas MD Anderson Cancer Center in Houston, Texas. His family set up a page on GoFundMe to bring him home to Atlanta to spend his final days. He died later that month on January 30 in Dawsonville, Georgia. He was 59 years old.
