= Anthony Young (baseball) =

American baseball player (1966–2017)

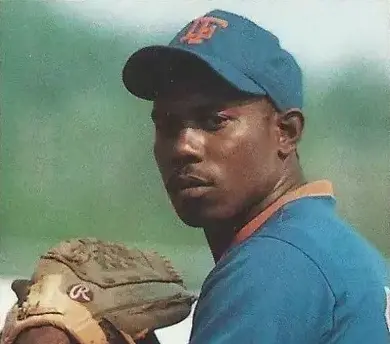
- Young with the Little Falls Mets c. 1988
- Pitcher
- Born: January 19, 1966; Houston, Texas, U.S.
- Died: June 27, 2017 (aged 51); Houston, Texas, U.S.
- Batted: Right Threw: Right

MLB debut
- August 5, 1991, for the New York Mets

Last MLB appearance
- June 19, 1996, for the Houston Astros

MLB statistics
- Win–loss record: 15–48
- Earned run average: 3.89
- Strikeouts: 245
- Stats at Baseball Reference

Teams
- New York Mets (1991–1993); Chicago Cubs (1994–1995); Houston Astros (1996)

Anthony Wayne Young (January 19, 1966 – June 27, 2017) was an American professional baseball pitcher. He played all or parts of six seasons in Major League Baseball (MLB) with the New York Mets, Chicago Cubs and Houston Astros. He is best known for having lost 27 consecutive games in which he had a decision, setting an MLB record.

== Career ==
Young attended Furr High School in Houston, Texas, and the University of Houston, where he played college baseball and college football for the Houston Cougars. The New York Mets selected Young in the 38th round of the 1987 Major League Baseball draft. He worked his way up through their minor league system, making his major league debut as a relief pitcher on August 5, 1991.

From May 6, 1992, to July 24, 1993, he lost 27 consecutive decisions with the Mets. This losing streak is the longest in MLB history, breaking the mark of 23 set by Cliff Curtis in 1910–11. During the losing streak, Young converted 12 straight save opportunities and threw 23 2/3 consecutive scoreless innings while filling in for Mets closer John Franco. During the streak, Young was 0–14 as a starter and 0–13 as a reliever. The streak ended on July 28, 1993, when he earned his first win since April 19, 1992.

Over roughly the same time period from April 14, 1992, to May 1, 1994, Young—as a Met and later a Cub—made 27 consecutive starts without a win. He made 13 quality starts among those 27, but his teams went 4–23 in those games. Before the 1994 season, the Mets traded Young and minor leaguer Ottis Smith to the Chicago Cubs for José Vizcaíno. He signed with the Houston Astros for the 1996 season. For his career, he finished with a record of 15 wins and 48 losses for a winning percentage of .238. He had a ERA+ of 100 and a positive WAR of 1.3 over his six-year career, illustrating the drawback of relying on the win metric as a barometer for pitcher quality.

== Personal life ==
After retiring, Young worked for eight years in a chemical plant. He also coached youth leagues and offered pitching lessons in Kingwood, Texas. He was the father of three.

In January 2017, Young revealed that he had been diagnosed with an inoperable brain tumor. Doctors were unsure at the time if the tumor was malignant. He underwent chemotherapy and reported in February that the tumor had shrunk. On June 27, 2017, his ex-teammate, Lenny Harris, reported on social media that Young was in a coma. Later that day, Young died at the age of 51. He is buried in Forest Park Lawndale Cemetery in Houston.
