= Bob Ayrault =

American baseball player (born 1966)

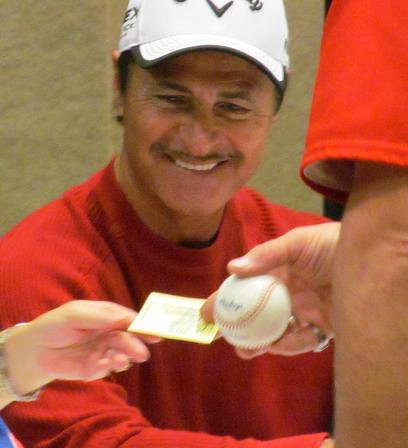
- Ayrault in 2012
- Pitcher
- Born: April 27, 1966 (age 60); South Lake Tahoe, California, U.S.
- Batted: Right Threw: Right

MLB debut
- June 7, 1992, for the Philadelphia Phillies

Last MLB appearance
- July 25, 1993, for the Seattle Mariners

MLB statistics
- Win–loss record: 5–3
- Earned run average: 4.05
- Strikeouts: 42
- Stats at Baseball Reference

Teams
- Philadelphia Phillies (1992–1993); Seattle Mariners (1993)

Robert Cunningham Ayrault (A-ralt; born April 27, 1966) is an American former professional baseball right-handed pitcher. He played in Major League Baseball (MLB) for the Philadelphia Phillies and Seattle Mariners.

Ayrault played college baseball at Moorpark Junior College and the UNLV Rebels. He was selected three times in the MLB draft but did not sign. He began his professional career with the independent Reno Silver Sox before signing with the Phillies. He was an Eastern League All-Star in 1990. He made his MLB debut in Philadelphia on June 7, 1992, against the St. Louis Cardinals, at Veterans Stadium. Philadelphia traded him to Seattle for Kevin Foster on June 12, 1993. Ayrault's last MLB appearance was for the Mariners on July 25, 1993, against the Cleveland Indians at Cleveland Stadium. His major league career ended at age 27. He was claimed by the Los Angeles Dodgers that August.

Ayrault was a replacement player with the Pittsburgh Pirates in spring training in 1995 during the ongoing players strike. He pitched his final season in Triple-A that year, also pitching in the Mexican Baseball League before three seasons in the Western League.

After his playing career, Ayrault was the baseball coach at Bishop Manogue High School in Reno, Nevada and opened a baseball training facility.
