= Julio Peguero =

Dominican baseball player (born 1968)

- Outfielder
- Born: September 7, 1968 (age 57); San Isidro, Dominican Republic
- Batted: Both Threw: Right

MLB debut
- April 8, 1992, for the Philadelphia Phillies

Last MLB appearance
- June 3, 1992, for the Philadelphia Phillies

MLB statistics
- Batting average: .222
- Home runs: 0
- Runs batted in: 0
- Stats at Baseball Reference

Teams
- Philadelphia Phillies (1992)

Julio Cesar Peguero Santana (born September 7, 1968) is a Dominican former professional baseball player. He appeared in 14 games for the Philadelphia Phillies of Major League Baseball in 1992, all as an outfielder. Overall, his professional career spanned 14 seasons, from 1987 until 2000.
