= Barry Jones (baseball) =

American baseball player (born 1963)

- Pitcher
- Born: February 15, 1963 (age 63); Centerville, Indiana, U.S.
- Batted: Right Threw: Right

MLB debut
- July 18, 1986, for the Pittsburgh Pirates

Last MLB appearance
- May 22, 1993, for the Chicago White Sox

MLB statistics
- Win–loss record: 33–33
- Earned run average: 3.66
- Strikeouts: 250
- Stats at Baseball Reference

Teams
- Pittsburgh Pirates (1986–1988); Chicago White Sox (1988–1990); Montreal Expos (1991); Philadelphia Phillies (1992); New York Mets (1992); Chicago White Sox (1993)

Barry Louis Jones (born February 15, 1963) is an American former professional baseball pitcher. He played in Major League Baseball (MLB) for the Pittsburgh Pirates, Chicago White Sox, Montreal Expos, Philadelphia Phillies, and New York Mets.

== Amateur career ==
Jones graduated from Centerville Senior High School and later attended Indiana University Bloomington. In 1983, he played collegiate summer baseball with the Cotuit Kettleers of the Cape Cod Baseball League and was named a league all-star. He was drafted by the Pirates in the third round of the 1984 amateur draft.

== Professional career ==
Jones played his first professional season with their Class A (Short Season) Watertown Pirates in 1984, and his last season with the Milwaukee Brewers' Triple-A New Orleans Zephyrs in 1994.

Jones started his career with Pittsburgh, pitching in 26 games with the Pittsburgh Pirates in 1986. He went 3–4 while finishing ten games with three saves in 37.1 innings for a 2.89 ERA. He fared worse in the following year, pitching in 32 games while going 2–4 with a 5.61 ERA in 43.1 innings. He got more playtime with the 1988 season, as he played 59 games with 25 games to finish with three saves in 82.1 innings. He had a 2.84 ERA while playing for the Pirates before being dealt to the Chicago White Sox for Dave LaPoint on August 13.

The next year, he went 3–2 while pitching in 22 games, garnering one save in 74 innings with a 2.37 ERA. Oddly enough, it was the first and only time in his career in which Jones saw his walks plus hits per inning pitched (WHIP) below 1.000, as he had a WHIP of 0.989 (having allowed 22 hits and 8 walks in 30.1 innings). Jones would have his peak in 1990. He made appearances in 65 games while pitching a 2.31 ERA with an 11–4 record in 74 innings with a save. On July 1, he was the winning pitcher in a game which saw Andy Hawkins pitch a no-hitter, but still lose the game. Jones came in to pitch the eighth inning with the score tied at zero. He allowed a base runner to reach on an error but then got the next three batters out. He received the win when the White Sox scored the go-ahead run in the 8th on three errors and two walks

On December 23, he was traded along with Ivan Calderon to the Montreal Expos Jeff Carter, Tim Raines, and Mario Brito.

His time with Montreal proved laborious. He pitched in 77 games (the most of his career and the most in the National League that year), pitching 88.2 innings while having a mediocre 4–9 record with a 3.35 ERA and 13 saves.

On December 9, he was traded by the Expos to the Philadelphia Phillies for catcher Darrin Fletcher and cash.

His troubles did not cease with new scenery. He went 7–6 with two teams and had a high 5.68 ERA with a WHIP of 1.722 while pitching 69.2 innings with one save.

On August 8, he was granted his release by the Phillies, then signed with the New York Mets six days later.

After the season ended, he signed with the Chicago White Sox as a free agent. He appeared in just six games that year, allowing eight runs (one unearned). His last appearance was on May 22, going an inning while allowing two runs on two hits with two walks and a strikeout. He was granted his release by the Sox on June 4.
