= List of Cincinnati Reds broadcasters =

== Some notable broadcasters ==
=== A ===
- Lee Allen (1945)

=== B ===
- Roger Baker (1939–44)
- Sam Balter (1942)
- Red Barber (1934–38) [*]
- Johnny Bench (1987–90)
- Dick Bray (1937–44)
- Jeff Brantley (2007–present) "The Cowboy"
- Marty Brennaman (1974–2019) [*] ...and this one belongs to the Reds!
- Thom Brennaman (1987–89, 2007–20)
- Bill Brown (1976–82), now with the Houston Astros
- C.O. "Oatmeal" Brown (1933)
- George Bryson (1956–60)
- Bob Burdette (1930)

=== C ===
- Dick Carlson (1980–83)
- Sean Casey (2011, 2013 fill-in)
- Gordy Coleman (1990–93)
- Ken Coleman (1975–79)

=== D ===
- Jim Day (2000–present)

=== G ===
- George Grande (1993–2009; fill-in 2010–2018)
- Danny Graves (2018–2020)

=== H ===
- Harry Hartman (1931–41)
- Tom Hedrick (1971–72)
- Dan Hoard (2000, 2003, 2009 fill-in)
- Waite Hoyt (1942–65, 1972) There was the pitch!
- Tom Hume (1990)

=== J ===
- Charlie Jones (1973–74)

=== K ===
- Paul Keels (2010)
- Jim Kelch (2008–17)
- Gene Kelly (1962–63)
- Ed Kennedy (1961–70)

=== L ===
- Steve LaMar (1990–92)
- Ray Lane (1979–84)
- Barry Larkin (2021–present)
- Sam LeCure (2018–present)

=== M ===
- Andy MacWilliams (1987)
- Frank McCormick (1958–68)
- Jim McIntyre (1966–70)
- Kent Mercker (2009, fill-in)
- Al Michaels (1971–73) She's gone!
- Gene Mittendorf (1924)
- Jack Moran (1955–61)
- Joe Morgan (1985)

=== N ===
- Dick Nesbitt (1942–44)
- Joe Nuxhall (1967-2004; occasionally 2004–2007) This is the old left-hander, rounding third and heading for home.

=== P ===
- Wes Parker (1973)
- Steve Physioc (1986)

=== R ===
- Jay Randolph (1988)
- Pee Wee Reese (1969–70)

=== S ===
- John Sadak (2021–present)
- Mark Scott (1956)
- Steve Stewart (2004-2006)
- Claude Sullivan (1964–67)
- Sidney Ten-Eyck (1930–33)

=== T ===
- Tommy Thrall (2018–present)

=== W ===
- Bob Waller (1971)
- Chris Welsh (1994–present) "The Crafty Left-Hander"
- Ken Wilson (1983–85)
- Woody Woodward (1974–75)

[*] Ford C. Frick Award

Source: Reds 2002 Media Guide

== Radio Broadcast Stations ==
Games were broadcast intermittently in the 1920s. From 1933 to 1945, broadcasts were shared among multiple stations.

- WFBE/WCPO: 1933–1942, 1945–54
- WSAI: 1933–1944, 1955–56
- WKRC: 1924 (as WMH), 1934–35, 1942–44, 1957–63
- WCKY: 1964-69
- WLW: 1929, 1969–present

== Television Broadcast Stations ==
- WLWT, 1948-1995
- Sports Time, 1984
- WSTR-TV, 1996-1998
- WKRC-TV, 1999, 2010-Current (Reds Opening Day only, simulcasted by Fox Sports Ohio)
- SportsChannel Ohio/Fox Sports Ohio/Bally Sports Ohio, 1991–present

== 2025 season lineups ==
Radio:

- Play-by-play: Tommy Thrall, Jim Day
- Analyst: Jeff Brantley, Chris Welsh, Sam LeCure

TV:

- Play-by-play: John Sadak, Jim Day
- Analyst: Barry Larkin (only home games), Jeff Brantley, Chris Welsh
- Pre- and post-game: Brian Giesenschlag, Annie Sabo, Sam LeCure
- Sideline: Jim Day, Annie Sabo

== See also ==
- List of current Major League Baseball announcers
