= A drive into deep left field by Castellanos =

2020 quotation and Internet meme

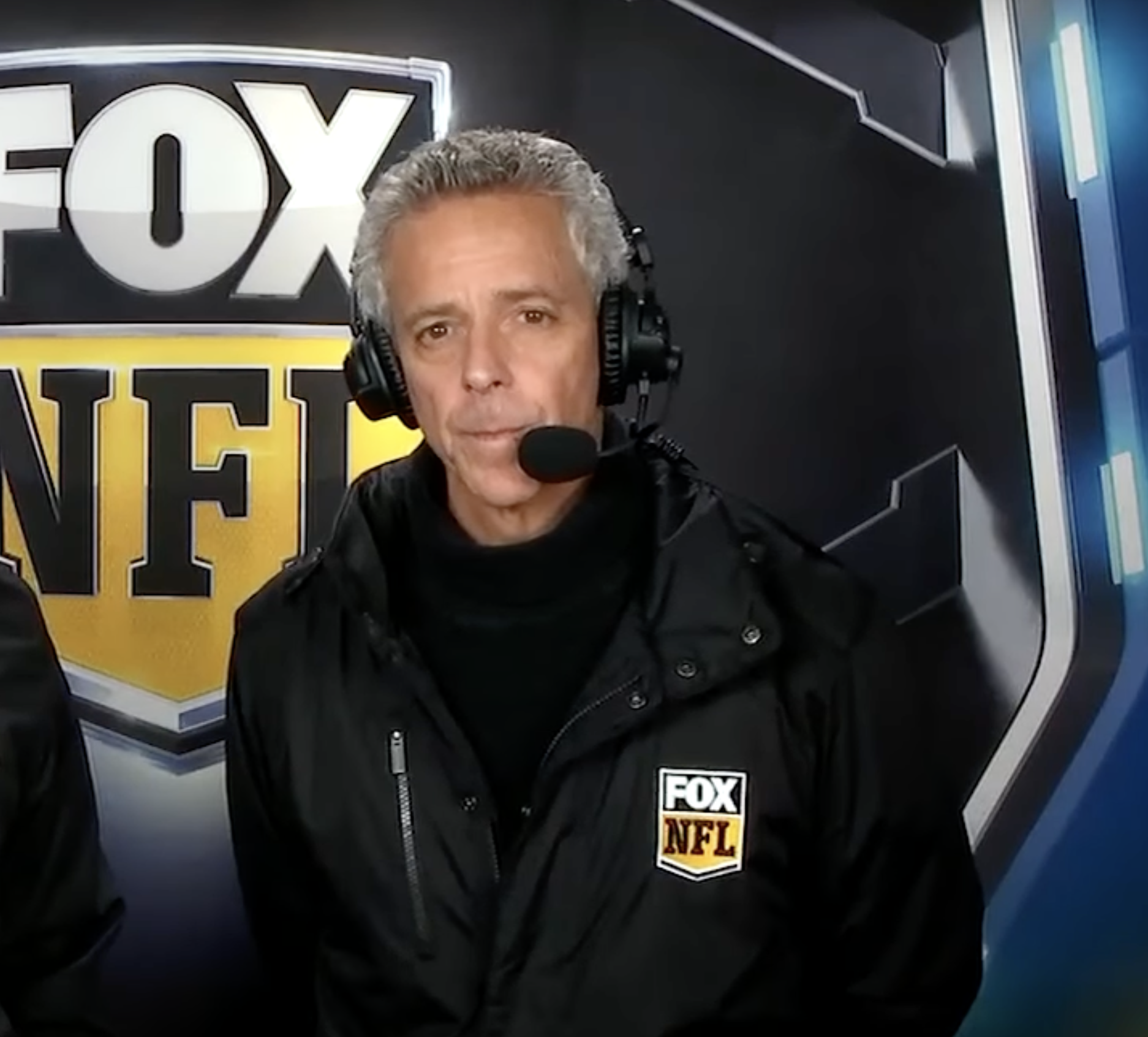
Thom Brennaman in 2018

"A drive into deep left field by Castellanos" is a phrase spoken by Thom Brennaman, a play-by-play announcer for the Cincinnati Reds, during a Major League Baseball game against the Kansas City Royals on August 19, 2020. Brennaman had been replaced in the middle of the broadcast for a hot mic statement in which he spoke the phrase "one of the fag capitals of the world". He gave an on-air apology later on, during which Reds outfielder Nick Castellanos hit a home run; Brennaman interrupted his apology to call the home run, describing the hit as "a drive into deep left field by Castellanos" before continuing. The surreal nature of the apology, as well as later incidents of Castellanos recording hits during other on-air broadcast discussions of negative events, gave it notoriety in baseball Internet culture and has led to its use as a copypasta.

== Background ==
Thom Brennaman, a baseball announcer for the Cincinnati Reds, did play-by-play commentary on Fox Sports Ohio of a doubleheader between the Reds and the Kansas City Royals at Kauffman Stadium in Kansas City, Missouri, on August 19, 2020. Before the start of the seventh inning of the first game, Brennaman was caught on a hot mic describing an unidentified location as "one of the fag capitals of the world". According to David J. Halberstam, who interviewed Brennaman more than a year after the incident, the location in question was San Francisco.

Brennaman, who was broadcasting remotely from Great American Ball Park in Cincinnati due to COVID-19 travel precautions, continued into a promotion for the Reds' pre-game show and went on to provide play-by-play commentary for the Reds on Fox Sports Ohio into the second game of the doubleheader. The slur was not heard over the cable and satellite feed of the game, but rather on the out-of-market streaming service MLB.tv. Backlash against Brennaman grew as clips of the incident were shared on social media.

== Apology ==
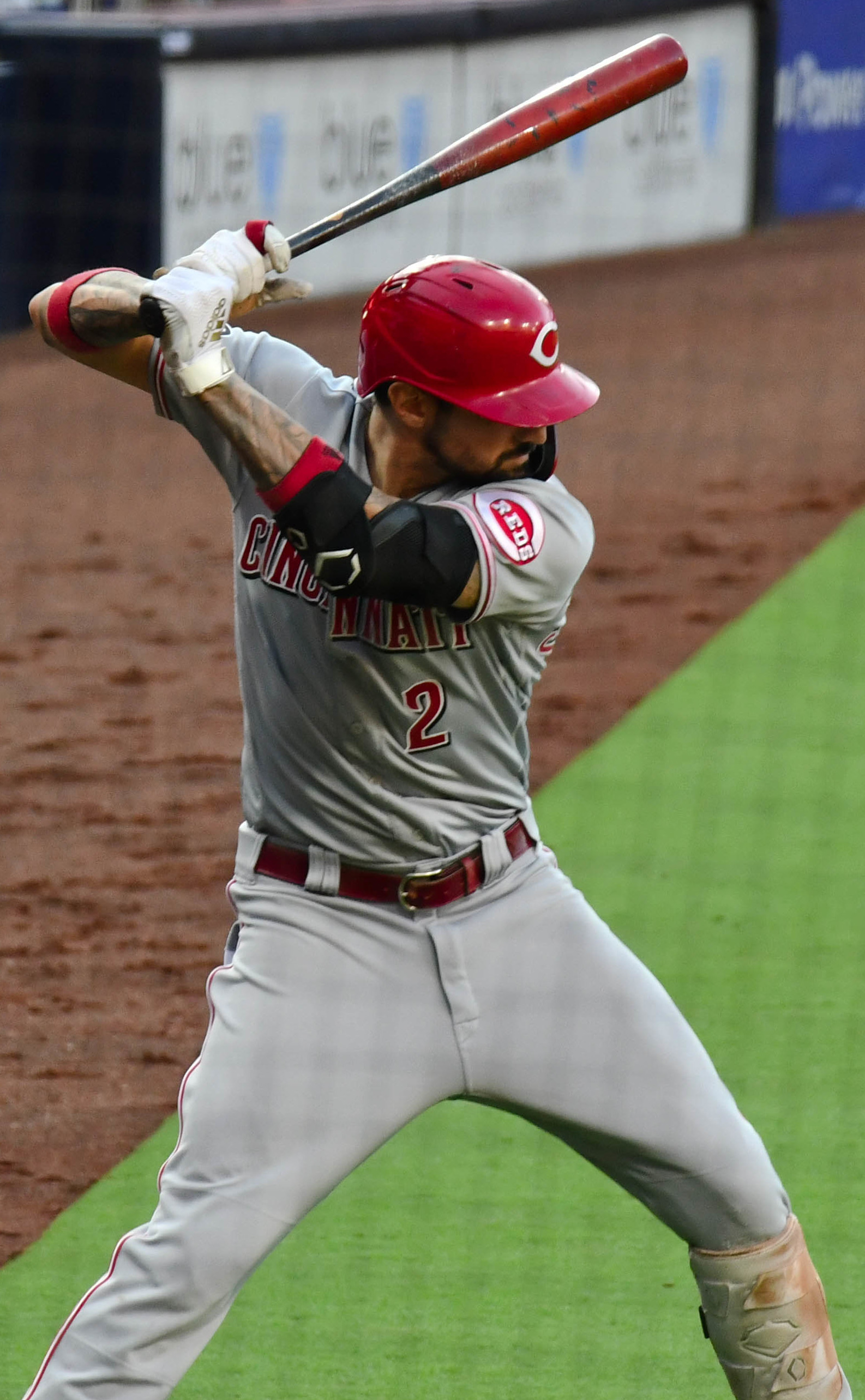
Castellanos in 2021

As the fifth inning of the second game was beginning, Brennaman was pulled off the Fox Sports Ohio broadcast by the Reds. Before being replaced by Jim Day, Brennaman issued an apology on the air:

3–0 ballgame with the Reds in front of the Royals as we go to the top half of the fifth inning, Castellanos to lead things off. Jim Day's gonna be taking us the rest of the way through this game as Holland takes over on the mound. Um, I made a comment earlier tonight that I guess went out over the air that I am deeply ashamed of. If I have hurt anyone out there, I can't tell you how much I say from the bottom of my heart, I'm so very, very sorry. I pride myself and think of myself as a man of faith—as there's a drive into deep left field by Castellanos, it will be a home run, and so that'll make it a 4–0 ballgame. I don't know if I'm gonna be putting on this headset again. I don't know if it's gonna be for the Reds, I don't know if it's gonna be for my bosses at Fox. I want to apologize for the people who sign my paycheck—for the Reds, for Fox Sports Ohio, for the people I work with, for anybody that I've offended here tonight. I can't begin to tell you how deeply sorry I am. That is not who I am. It never has been. And I'd like to think maybe I could have some people that could back that up. I am very, very sorry, and I beg for your forgiveness. Jim Day will take you the rest of the way home.

During the apology, Reds outfielder Nick Castellanos hit a home run that landed next to a Planet Fitness billboard ironically featuring the phrase "judgement-free zone".

== Reactions ==
Later that night, the Cincinnati Reds issued a statement on Twitter expressing apologies and announcing Brennaman's immediate suspension. Reds pitchers Amir Garrett and Matt Bowman tweeted separate statements in support of the LGBTQ community. The following day, Fox Sports announced that Brennaman would no longer serve as an announcer for the channel's National Football League broadcasts. On September 25, after Brennaman announced his resignation, Reds CEO Bob Castellini issued a statement calling Brennaman a "fantastic talent and a good man who remains part of the Reds family forever".

Some media commentators noted that the apology appeared weak and insincere. Human Rights Campaign president Alphonso David described the incident as "unfortunate" and "a reflection of the bias that we still have in our communities", stating that "I think we need to really think about how this is how he felt so comfortable [saying the slur] in the first place." GLAAD released a statement calling the apology "incredibly weak and not enough".

Both Castellanos and his wife have expressed awareness of the jokes. In 2021, she posted on Twitter that she wanted the jokes to stop. He acknowledged the incident in a February 2023 Instagram post, which showed him practicing his swing in preparation for spring training and bore the caption "And there's a deep drive... Phillies '23".

== Impact ==
In a podcast released in November 2021, Brennaman expressed disappointment in the popular response to his apology, stating: "But for people to criticize a sincere apology ... That's when you know that there is a lot wrong with a lot of people. Not just me – and I've got a lot wrong with me. There is a lot wrong in this world."

After the incident, Brennaman began working with LGBTQ outreach groups such as the Children's Home of Northern Kentucky and PFLAG. Local leaders of the LGBTQ community in Cincinnati cited his subsequent work as a reason to support his return to broadcasting.

On July 21, 2024, Brennaman announced that he would return to broadcasting as the lead commentator for CW Football Saturday. On that same day, Castellanos hit a home run, leading to the commentator of the game repeating Brennaman's famous phrase.

Ahead of the football game between Boston College and Syracuse in November, Brennaman alluded to the incident while discussing both teams' quarterbacks, placing emphasis on the surname of the unrelated Boston College player Thomas Castellanos and smirking at the camera as he called, "Couple of good quarterbacks in this one. You know about Kyle McCord, we'll also see Thomas Castellanos! How about that?" Awful Announcing quipped that "it's likely that Nick Castellanos would've hit a home run the same day" had the game taken place during the MLB season.

The Hulu television series Paradise included a reference to the nature of Castellanos hitting home runs at inopportune moments in its fifth episode of the second season, with a fictional version of the ESPN program Get Up discussing the highlights of a Phillies game in which Castellanos hit a walk-off home run, only to be interrupted about breaking news regarding the apocalyptic event that occurs in Paradise; series' creator Dan Fogelman went to the University of Pennsylvania and includes references to Philadelphia in his projects.

=== Copypasta ===
Jokes incorporating the phrase "a drive into deep left field by Castellanos" began to circulate shortly after the broadcast, including a tweet by Pablo Torre that parodied Richard Nixon's resignation speech:

I have never been a quitter. To leave office before my term is completed is abhorrent to every instinct in my body. But as President, I must put the interest of America first. And there's a drive into deep left field by Castellanos.

The use of the apology as a copypasta did not gain traction until after Bob Castellini's September 25 statement praising Brennaman. In March 2021, College of Charleston professor Ryan M. Milner attributed the proliferation of the copypasta to the virality of the original apology and the non sequitur nature of the home run call; it was described in The Ringer as "surreally spoken with the same sober intonation as the self-castigation" and in Slate as "one of the most surreal moments in sports broadcasting history". According to Milner, the copypasta allows people to jokingly convey cynicism towards insincere statements.

On September 26, 2026, Minnesota Twins announcer Cory Provus referenced the meme while talking about a fan with terminal cancer. When Jake Burger hit a homer, he interrupted his statement by saying, "Swing and a drive by Castellanos, and Burger just hit a home run to center, and now it’s a 6-1 Texas lead...Anyway," before continuing the story.

== Further incidents ==
On several occasions, Castellanos has had on-field success during broadcasts which were, by coincidence or possibly on purpose by broadcasting crews, discussing negative real-life happenings during his at-bats. In other cases, his baseball feats occurred on the same day as but not coinciding with major news events.

- May 1, 2011: Castellanos hit his first career home run as a professional baseball player, as a minor league player with the West Michigan Whitecaps, on the same night that Al-Qaeda terrorist leader and FBI Most Wanted fugitive Osama bin Laden was killed.
- July 5, 2021: Against Kansas City, Castellanos hit a home run while Royals play-by-play commentator Ryan Lefebvre was eulogizing George Gorman, a veteran of World War II whose son Pat Gorman had been working for the Royals for 26 years at the time.
- March 27, 2022: During a spring training game against the Toronto Blue Jays, Blue Jays color commentator Buck Martinez spoke extensively on pitching coach Pete Walker's DUI during a Castellanos at-bat in which he ultimately hit a single.
- May 30, 2022: During a Memorial Day tribute by Phillies play-by-play announcer Tom McCarthy honoring American veterans and American servicemen who lost their lives, Castellanos hit a solo home run to left field in the second inning of a 5–4 loss to the San Francisco Giants. His home run gave the Phillies a 1–0 lead.
- October 11, 2023: During Game 3 of the National League Division Series against the Atlanta Braves, Castellanos hit a two-run homer to left center as the TBS commentators were discussing former Phillies manager Charlie Manuel's rehabilitation following a stroke.
- June 18, 2024: Roughly a half hour after the announcement of the death of Willie Mays, the Phillies defeated the San Diego Padres after Castellanos recorded a walk-off double to right field, his fourth hit of the game.
- July 21, 2024: Two and a half hours after President Joe Biden announced he would not seek the Democratic nomination for the 2024 presidential election, and on the day news broke that Brennaman would return to national broadcasts, Castellanos hit a home run to left field to score the Phillies' final run of a 6–0 win over the Pittsburgh Pirates.
- April 6, 2025: Minutes after Alexander Ovechkin broke Wayne Gretzky's all time NHL goal record, Castellanos hit a grand slam against the Los Angeles Dodgers.

After the death of Pope Francis on April 21, 2025, FanDuel temporarily locked betting on Castellanos hitting a home run in an upcoming game against the New York Mets due to the high number of bets placed. On BetMGM, three times as many bets were placed on Castellanos compared to other players. According to The Athletic, odds on the site dropped from +775 to +550 due to the sudden increase in bets placed. However, he failed to hit a home run that day, or get a hit, in a 5–4 loss to the Mets.
