= Thom Brennaman =

American sportscaster (born 1963)

- Brennaman in 2018
- Born: Thomas Wade Brennaman; September 12, 1963 (age 63); Chapel Hill, North Carolina, U.S.
- Education: Ohio University
- Occupation: Sportscaster
- Years active: 1986–present
- Spouse: Polly
- Children: 2
- Parent(s): Marty Brennaman and Brenda Dickey
- Sports commentary career
- Teams: Chicago Cubs (1990–1995); Arizona Diamondbacks (1998–2006); Cincinnati Reds (1988–1989; 2007–2020)
- Sports: Baseball; football; basketball
- Employer: Fox Sports (1994–2020); Big Ten Network (2007–2008); Roberto Clemente League (2021–2022); Chatterbox Sports (2021–present); CW Sports (2024–present)

Thomas Wade Brennaman (born September 12, 1963) is an American television sportscaster, currently the lead announcer for CW Sports college football games. He is the son of former Cincinnati Reds radio sportscaster Marty Brennaman. He served as a play-by-play commentator for Fox Sports from its inception in 1994 through 2020, the television voice of the Arizona Diamondbacks from 1998 to 2006, and as the voice of the Cincinnati Reds from 2007 through 2020. His career with the Reds and Fox Sports ended abruptly when he was caught on a hot mic making a homophobic statement during a game broadcast. His on-air apology, in which he interrupted himself to call "a drive into deep left field by Castellanos", became an internet meme. Since leaving the Reds, he has served as a commentator for the Roberto Clemente League and for Chatterbox Sports.

== Broadcasting career ==
After graduating in 1982 from Cincinnati's Anderson High School, Brennaman attended Ohio University, where he was president of the Beta Kappa chapter of Beta Theta Pi fraternity. He entered college uncertain of whether to follow in his father's footsteps and become a broadcaster. While at Ohio, he joined station WATH, developing his own love for radio. After graduating in 1986, Brennaman worked as a sports reporter/anchor for WLWT-TV, the NBC affiliate in Cincinnati. During this same period, he worked as the television play-by-play announcer for the Cincinnati Reds alongside Major League Baseball Hall of Famer Johnny Bench.

In the early 1990s, he did Chicago Cubs broadcasts for WGN-TV and its national superstation feed, alternating with Hall of Fame broadcaster Harry Caray between television and radio. Normally, Brennaman called the first three innings and last three innings on WGN radio, and the middle portion of the game on television.

=== Fox Sports ===
In 1994, he was hired by Fox Sports to call the network's National Football League and Major League Baseball telecasts. Brennaman has also called college football and college basketball for Fox as well. He served as the first television voice for the Arizona Diamondbacks from 1998 to 2006 and left after the 2006 season to join his father Marty in Cincinnati.

In 2006, Brennaman was named as Fox's lead play-by-play announcer for the Bowl Championship Series. In addition to calling the BCS National Championship Game, Brennaman called the 2007 Fiesta Bowl. On both broadcasts, Brennaman worked with former University of Wisconsin–Madison head coach Barry Alvarez (only in 2007), and former University of Tennessee defensive back and current broadcaster Charles Davis. Brennaman also called the 2008 Sugar Bowl and the 2009 Orange Bowl.

Additionally, the Big Ten Network named Brennaman as its lead play-by-play announcer for college football games for two seasons beginning in September 2007. He would return to calling NFL games for Fox full-time in 2009 (Prior to this, Brennaman worked NFL games for Fox previously from 1994–1997, 1999–2000 and 2004–2008 as a regular and/or fill-in announcer), working primarily with Brian Billick (and later, on David Diehl, Charles Davis, and Chris Spielman) but also filling in as lead announcer while Joe Buck did the MLB playoffs. Prior to that, Brennaman had been the voice of the Cotton Bowl Classic on Fox from 2000 to 2006.

Brennaman, along with Brian Billick, Laura Okmin, and Chris Myers called the 2012 NFC Divisional Playoff matchup between the Seattle Seahawks and the Atlanta Falcons instead of Kenny Albert, Daryl Johnston, and Tony Siragusa. This was Brennaman's first time calling an NFL playoff game, although Brennaman and Billick called the 2011 Pro Bowl along with Terry Bradshaw and sideline reporters Tony Siragusa and Jay Glazer.

==== National baseball work ====
Brennaman was a part of Fox Sports' #2 baseball broadcast team (behind Joe Buck and Tim McCarver) from the beginning of Fox's involvement in Major League Baseball in 1996 until 2015. He has teamed with Bob Brenly, Steve Lyons, Joe Girardi, and Eric Karros. In this capacity, he called play-by-play for numerous postseason games from 1996 until 2006. Brennaman was, notably, on the call for the controversial "Steve Bartman incident" during Game 6 of the 2003 National League Championship Series between the Chicago Cubs and Florida Marlins. Brennaman during that particular play said "Again in the air, down the left field line. Alou... reaching into the stands... and couldn't get it and he's livid with a fan!" Alongside Mark Grace, Brennaman was also on the call when then-Diamondback Randy Johnson threw the 17th perfect game in MLB history on May 18, 2004, against the Atlanta Braves.

From 2007 to 2013, the #2 team was not given any postseason assignments due to Fox not holding the rights to any concurrent postseason series.

In 2014, Brennaman and Karros began to split the #2 role with Matt Vasgersian and John Smoltz. Fox also returned to using multiple broadcast teams in the postseason that year; however, Brennaman and Karros were passed over in favor of Vasgersian and Smoltz for the playoff assignment. In 2015, Matt Vasgersian and Smoltz took over the role full-time, essentially ending Brennaman's national Fox baseball role. Brennaman subsequently moved over to the Reds broadcasts full-time (save for when working Fox NFL games).

=== Cincinnati Reds ===
On October 3, 2006, Cincinnati Reds owner Robert Castellini hired Brennaman through the 2010 season to announce 45 Reds games on FS Ohio television and 45 games on WLW and the Cincinnati Reds Radio Network. Thom no longer broadcasts for the Cincinnati Reds, and Marty retired near the end of the 2019 season.

==== Suspension for on-air comments ====
On August 19, 2020, while providing commentary on Fox Sports Ohio for the first game of an away doubleheader between the Reds and the Kansas City Royals, Brennaman was caught on a hot mic calling a city, later revealed to be San Francisco, "one of the fag capitals of the world." The Reds pulled him off the air during the second game, with studio host Jim Day taking over play-by-play after the top of the fifth inning. Before leaving the booth, Brennaman apologized for his earlier anti-gay slur, saying that he was "deeply ashamed" if he "hurt anyone out there." He also hinted that his broadcasting future was in doubt, saying, "I don't know if I'm going to be putting on this headset again."

Many people noted the awkwardness of the apology; as Brennaman continued, he suddenly paused to call a home run by Nick Castellanos:

I'm so very, very sorry. I pride myself and think of myself as a man of faith—as there's a drive into deep left field by Castellanos, it will be a home run, and so that'll make it a 4–0 ballgame.

He went on to state that he apologized "for the people who sign my paycheck", and asserted, "That is not who I am, and never has been. And I'd like to think that maybe I could have some people that, uh, that could back that up."

Later that night, the Reds announced that Brennaman had been suspended indefinitely pending an internal review. The following day, Fox Sports announced that Brennaman would not be part of its NFL broadcast roster in 2020.

Brennaman wrote a longer apology for The Cincinnati Enquirer the next day, after speaking with MLB Vice President, Ambassador for Inclusion Billy Bean. He also called WCPO-TV anchor Evan Millward, who posted an editorial on his station's website criticizing his Fox Sports Ohio statement as a non-apology apology, and said he would reach out to the LGBTQ+ organization PFLAG to make further amends. Almost a month later, Brennaman officially resigned from the Reds and Fox Sports Ohio; however, the Reds had already informed Brennaman that he would not return for the 2021 season. Brennaman told USA Today that he realized his remark "hurt a lot of people" and that he will "have to live with it for the rest of my life."

Brennaman was replaced by John Sadak for Reds games, and Kevin Kugler for NFL games on Fox.

Brennaman's apology quickly became an internet meme among baseball fans. The meme evolved into a correlation between Nick Castellanos and hitting untimely home runs, such as when he hit a home run during the eulogy for a World War II veteran on a Royals broadcast or when he hit a home run on the 20th anniversary of the September 11 attacks. The meme eventually gained mainstream popularity, frequently being used as a copypasta in response to public apologies that were perceived as non-apologies. Social media users would mockingly reiterate the perceived non-apology in question only to interrupt with Brennaman's infamous home run call, making a satirical comparison to Brennaman's heavily criticized apology.

In November 2024, Brennaman jokingly acknowledged the incident while calling the Boston College–Syracuse football game for the CW. While discussing the teams' quarterbacks, he emphasized the surname of Boston College's Thomas Castellanos and gave a smirk to the camera.

=== Later broadcasting work ===
In December 2020, it was announced that Brennaman would serve as a play-by-play announcer for the Roberto Clemente League in Puerto Rico for the 2020–21 season.

On July 22, 2021, Chatterbox Sports, a subscription-based streaming service that broadcasts high school games in the Cincinnati area, hired Brennaman as their new play-by-play announcer. Chatterbox president Trace Fowler said of the hiring that he wanted to give Brennaman a second chance, saying that, while he is not downplaying what Brennaman said, Fowler said upon further research that Brennaman "is a great person who made a mistake that I know he’s deeply regretful for."

In 2024, Andrew Marchand of The Athletic reported that Brennaman had been hired by CW Sports as its lead announcer for college football games, primarily its ACC package, starting in the upcoming season. In this role Brennaman called the first Snoop Dogg Arizona Bowl held on December 28, 2024 in Tucson, Arizona.

In April 2025, Brennaman became the host of a morning talk show on Cincinnati radio station 700 WLW.

== Other ventures ==
Brennaman has contributed voice-over work for video games Microsoft Baseball 2001, All-Star Baseball 2002, and All-Star Baseball 2003–2005 for GameCube, PlayStation 2 and Xbox. He has also done college basketball announcing for CBS Radio and Fox Sports Net cable. He formerly was a spokesman for CBTS, a Cincinnati Bell company, in television commercials. He also called basketball games for the Cincinnati Bearcats and Fox College Hoops.

Preceded by Keith Jackson	BCS National Championship Game broadcaster 2007–2009	Succeeded by Brent Musburger
Preceded by Greg Gumbel (in 1993)	Secondary play-by-play announcer, Major League Baseball Game of the Week; 1996–2014	Succeeded by Matt Vasgersian
