= Nick Castellanos =

American baseball player (born 1992)

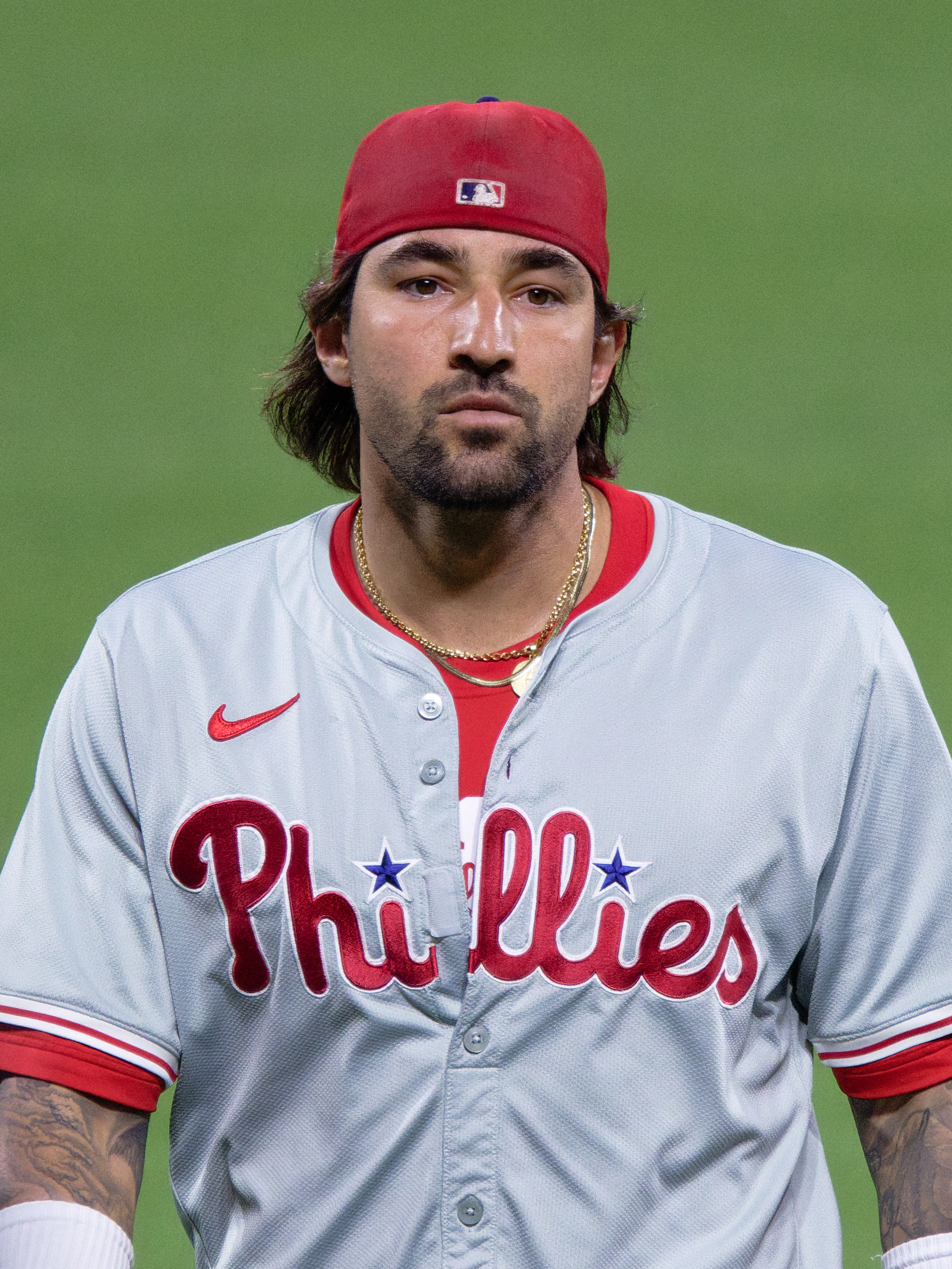
- Castellanos with the Philadelphia Phillies in 2024

Free agent
- Outfielder / Third baseman
- Born: March 4, 1992 (age 34); Davie, Florida, U.S.
- Bats: Right Throws: Right

MLB debut
- September 1, 2013, for the Detroit Tigers

MLB statistics (through 2026 season)
- Batting average: .270
- Hits: 1,764
- Home runs: 254
- Runs batted in: 940
- Stats at Baseball Reference

Teams
- Detroit Tigers (2013–2019); Chicago Cubs (2019); Cincinnati Reds (2020–2021); Philadelphia Phillies (2022–2025); San Diego Padres (2026)

Career highlights and awards
- 2× All-Star (2021, 2023); Silver Slugger Award (2021)

Nicholas Alexander Castellanos (/kɑːstiˈjɑːnoʊs/ kah-stee-YAH-nohss; born March 4, 1992) is an American former professional baseball right fielder and third baseman who played 14 seasons in Major League Baseball. He played for the Detroit Tigers, Chicago Cubs, Cincinnati Reds, Philadelphia Phillies, and San Diego Padres.

Drafted out of high school in 2010 by the Detroit Tigers, Castellanos became one of the top prospects in baseball. Castellanos appeared in the 2012 All-Star Futures Game and was named its most valuable player. He made his MLB debut with the Tigers on September 1, 2013. In 2019, the Tigers traded Castellanos to the Chicago Cubs. Before the 2020 season, he signed a four-year contract with the Cincinnati Reds. In 2021, he was selected to play in the All-Star Game, won the Silver Slugger Award, and was named to the All-MLB Second Team.

Following the end of the 2021 season, Castellanos opted out of his contract with the Reds and then signed a five-year contract with the Phillies. Castellanos spent four seasons with the Phillies, earning All-Star honors in 2023. Released after the 2025 season, Castellanos signed with the Padres, however was released by them in June.

== Early life ==
Castellanos was raised by his parents, Michelle and Jorge, in South Florida. He is of Cuban descent through his father. His mother's family is based in Michigan. He played little league baseball in Davie, Florida. Castellanos attended the American Heritage School in Plantation, Florida, where he played for the school's baseball team. American Heritage won the Florida state championship in his sophomore year. Castellanos transferred to Archbishop McCarthy High School in Southwest Ranches, Florida, before his junior year. He was named Gatorade Player of the Year for the state of Florida after finishing his senior season with a .542 batting average, 34 runs scored, 41 runs batted in (RBIs) and 22 stolen bases while leading his team to the Class 4A state championship. In the 2009 Under Armour All-America Baseball Game, played at Wrigley Field, he scored three runs, had four doubles and three RBIs, winning Most Valuable Player honors. The Sun-Sentinel named Castellanos the Class 6A-5A-4A Player of the Year.

Castellanos played for the United States national baseball team for individuals 18 years of age and under in the 2009 Pan American Junior Championships, in which he batted .356 with six doubles and nine RBIs, leading all players with 14 runs scored, as the team won the gold medal. Castellanos was named to the All-Tournament team. He committed to attend the University of Miami on a baseball scholarship. He intended to play college baseball for the Miami Hurricanes baseball team in the Atlantic Coast Conference.

== Professional career ==
=== Detroit Tigers ===
==== Minor leagues ====
The Detroit Tigers selected Castellanos in the first round, with the 44th overall pick, in the 2010 Major League Baseball draft. He was rated by Baseball America as the third best power hitting prospect and fourteenth best overall prospect prior to the draft. He slipped because of his commitment to the University of Miami. He signed with the Tigers, receiving a $3.45 million signing bonus, the highest bonus at that point ever given to a player taken after the first round. (Note: The record was surpassed by Josh Bell the following year.) The deal was almost invalidated, as the Tigers' email to the office of Commissioner of Baseball Bud Selig was not received until three minutes after the midnight deadline on August 15, 2010; a text message about the deal to Selig's office received at 11:59 convinced Selig to approve the deal.

Though Castellanos played shortstop in high school, the Tigers shifted him to third base as a professional. Castellanos appeared in seven games for the Gulf Coast Tigers of the Rookie-level Gulf Coast League that season. Before the 2011 season, Baseball America rated Castellanos as the 65th-best prospect in baseball. He played for the West Michigan Whitecaps of the Single-A Midwest League. With the Whitecaps, Castellanos batted .312 with seven home runs and 76 RBI, leading the Midwest League with 158 hits and being named the Tigers' minor league position player of the year.

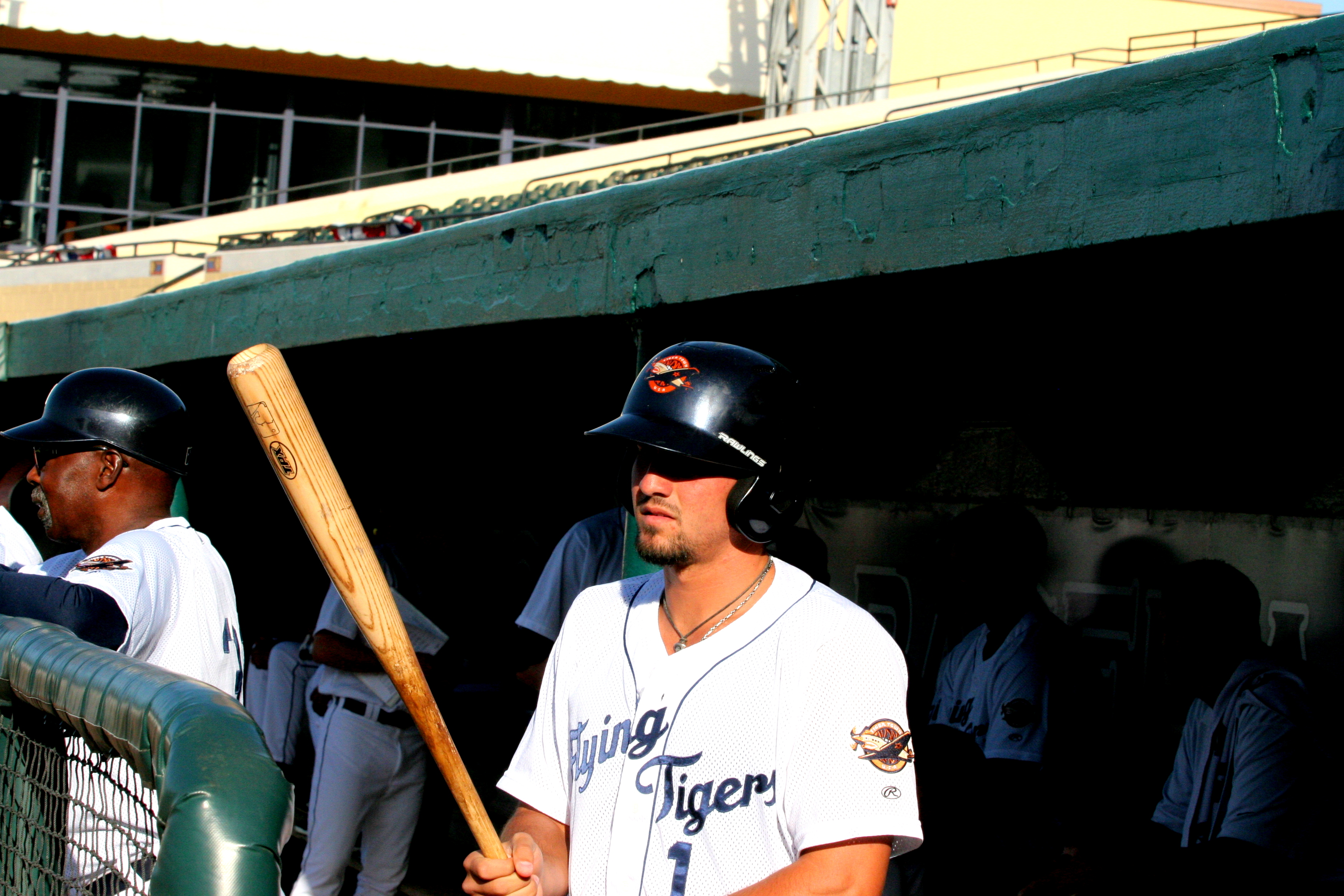
Castellanos with the Lakeland Flying Tigers in 2012

Prior to the 2012 season, Baseball America ranked him as the second best prospect in the organization and 45th best in baseball. The Tigers invited Castellanos to spring training in 2012, and expected to assign him to either the High-A Lakeland Tigers of the Florida State League or the Double-A Erie SeaWolves of the Eastern League. Castellanos began the 2012 season with Single-A Lakeland. He was named the Tigers' minor league player in May 2012. After he batted .402 with 32 RBI in 55 games for Lakeland, the Tigers promoted Castellanos to Erie on June 4. Appearing in the 2012 All-Star Futures Game, Castellanos hit a three-run home run, and was named the game's Most Valuable Player. He batted .264 with Erie that year.

Castellanos was blocked at third base by Miguel Cabrera and at first base by Prince Fielder. He had been seen as a potential centerpiece for a trade to acquire a marquee talent. However, the Tigers considered Castellanos untouchable in trade negotiations. Castellanos began to take outfield practice in left field during the 2012 season.

With Castellanos now playing left field on a full-time basis, the Tigers optioned him to the Toledo Mud Hens of the Triple-A International League at the start of the 2013 season. In 134 games for the Mud Hens, Castellanos batted .276 with 18 home runs and 76 RBI. He appeared in the Triple-A All-Star Game and was named to the International League's post-season All-Star team.

==== 2013–2016 ====
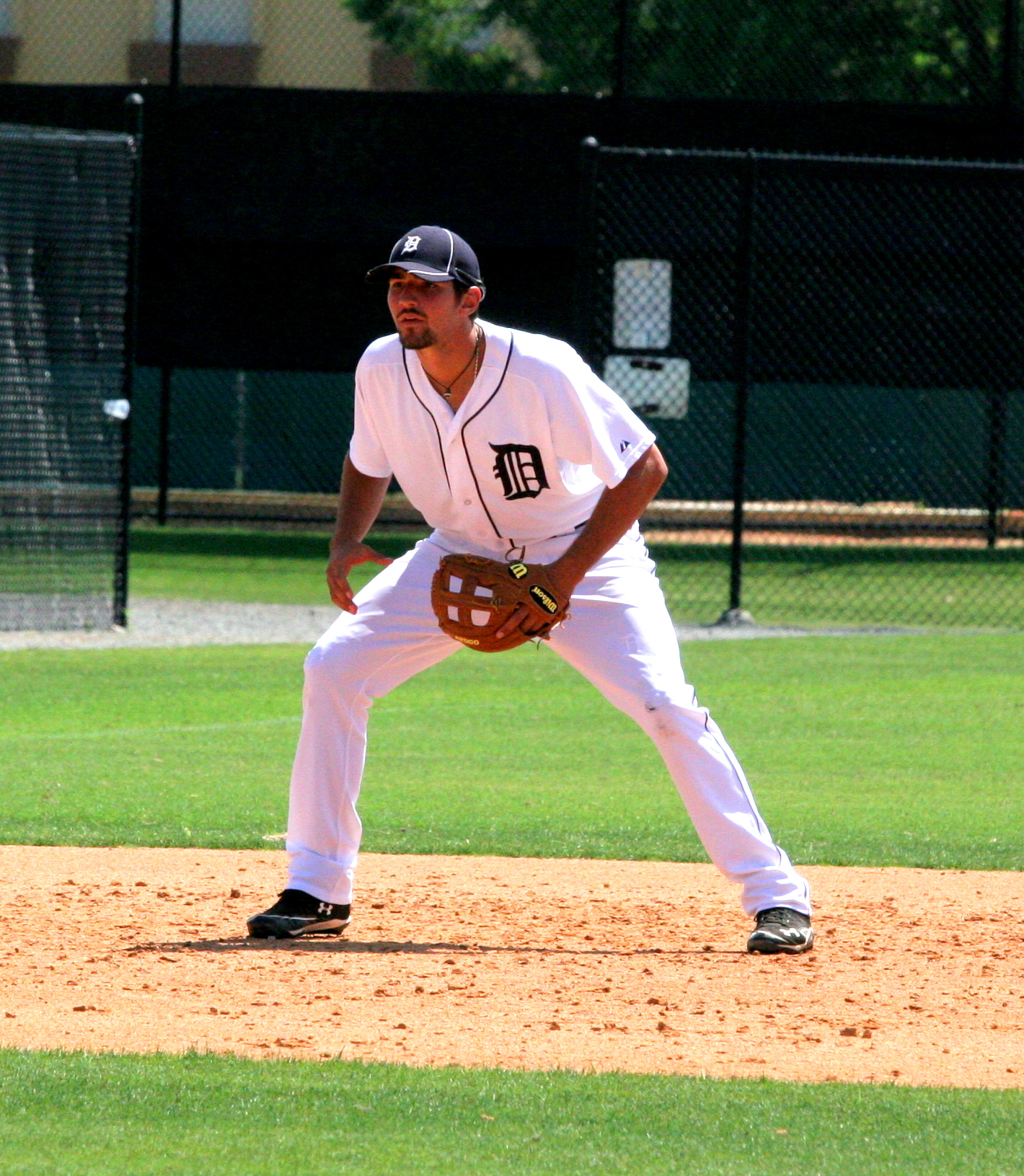
Castellanos fielding for the Tigers in spring training, 2012

When major league rosters expanded on September 1, 2013, Castellanos was among the players promoted to the Tigers, and made his major league debut that day, playing left field. On September 7, Castellanos made his first major league start, and recorded his first major league hit, an infield single, off Danny Duffy. However, he received infrequent playing time, as the Tigers were in a pennant race and manager Jim Leyland preferred to use players with more major league experience. He batted 5-for-18 with the Tigers in 2013.

After the 2013 season, the Tigers traded Prince Fielder. Dave Dombrowski, the general manager of the Tigers at that time, said that they would shift Miguel Cabrera to first base, and use Castellanos as their starting third baseman for 2014.

Castellanos hit his first MLB home run on April 9, 2014, off the top of the wall in dead center field off Josh Beckett of the Los Angeles Dodgers at Dodger Stadium. He finished his rookie season with a .259 batting average, 11 home runs, 31 doubles and 66 RBIs. He was named the 2014 Detroit Tigers/Detroit Sports Media Association Rookie of the Year.

On July 22, 2015, Castellanos hit his first career grand slam off Mike Montgomery of the Seattle Mariners. Castellanos hit .255 that season while slamming 15 home runs and driving in 73.

Through the All-Star break of the 2016 season, Castellanos was hitting .302 with 17 home runs and 51 RBIs, while playing as the Tigers' starting third baseman. On August 6, Castellanos was struck by a pitch from New York Mets reliever Logan Verrett, fracturing the fifth metacarpal bone in his left hand. After the game, Castellanos was placed on the 15-day disabled list for the first time in his career, and was expected to miss at least four weeks. Castellanos did not return to the Tigers until the final week of the regular season, entering a September 27 game against the Cleveland Indians as a pinch hitter. During the 2016 season, Castellanos set career highs with a .285 average, 18 home runs, .331 on-base percentage, and a .496 slugging percentage, despite being limited to 110 games.

==== 2017–2019 ====
On January 13, 2017, the Tigers avoided arbitration with Castellanos, agreeing on a one-year contract worth $3 million. On July 18, Castellanos hit a single, triple and two home runs in a game against the Kansas City Royals, becoming the fourth Tigers player to do so since 1913, and the first Tigers player to do so since Dmitri Young in 2003.

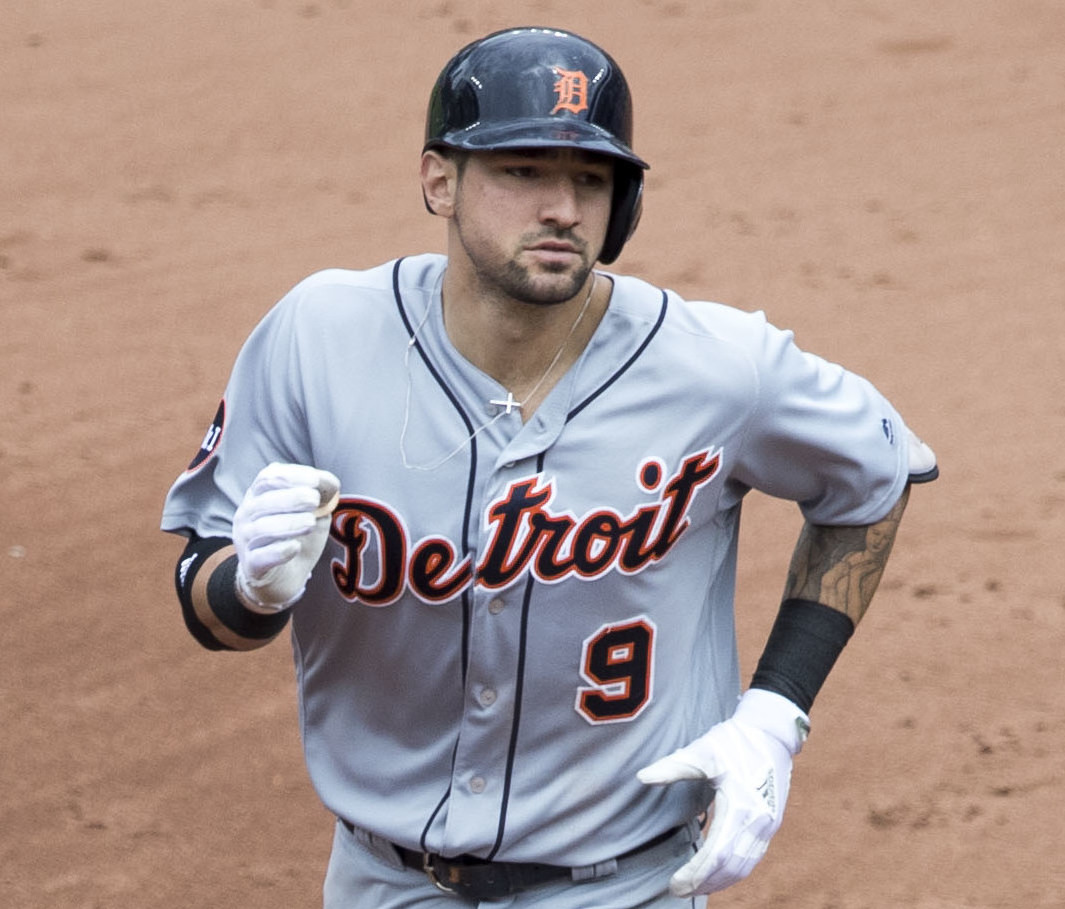
Castellanos with the Tigers in 2017

On September 29, Castellanos recorded his 100th RBI of the season. Castellanos became the 10th player in Tigers history to drive in more than 100 runs at the age of 25 or younger, and the first player to do so since Miguel Cabrera in 2008. He became the sixth player in Tigers history to record 10 or more triples, 25 or more home runs, and 100 or more RBIs in a season, and the first player to do so since Al Kaline in 1956. Castellanos finished 2017 with a .272 batting average, while setting career highs in doubles (36), triples (10), home runs (26) and RBIs (101). His 10 triples led the American League. He struggled defensively, however, as he led all third basemen with 18 errors and had a league-worst .939 fielding percentage among qualified third basemen. With the acquisition of third baseman Jeimer Candelario and the departure of right fielder J. D. Martinez, both in July trades, Castellanos began playing games in right field from early September to the end of the 2017 season.

On January 17, 2018, the Tigers avoided arbitration with Castellanos, agreeing on a one-year contract worth $6.05 million. On August 13, Castellanos went 5-for-5 with five RBIs, for his first career five-hit game. He became the first Tigers player with five hits in a game since Ian Kinsler in 2015. With two singles, two doubles, and a home run, he also became the first Tiger with 10 total bases in a game since Justin Upton in 2017. Castellanos earned American League Player of the Week honors for the week of August 13–19. In seven games, he batted .393 with an OBP of .485 and had two homers, three doubles, eight runs scored, and ten RBI. The award was the first weekly honor for any Tiger player in 2018, and the first since J.D. Martinez won the award for the week ending July 17, 2017.

Castellanos hit a career-high .298 in the 2018 season, adding 23 home runs and 89 RBIs. He finished among the AL leaders in hits (185, third), doubles (46, fourth), and multi-hit games (56, third). He also led all MLB hitters (60 or more plate appearances) in batting average against left-handers, at .381. He was named the 2018 Tiger of the Year by the Detroit Chapter of the Baseball Writers' Association of America (BBWAA).

On January 11, 2019, the Tigers avoided arbitration with Castellanos, agreeing on a one-year contract worth $9.95 million.

=== Chicago Cubs ===
On July 31, 2019, the Tigers traded Castellanos along with cash considerations to the Chicago Cubs in exchange for Alex Lange and Paul Richan. In August, Castellanos hit .348 with 11 home runs, 20 RBIs, and nine doubles to go along with a .385 on-base percentage and a .713 slugging percentage. In 51 games for the Cubs in 2019, Castellanos hit .321 with 16 home runs, 36 RBIs, and a 1.002 OPS. For the 2019 season, Castellanos had a .289 batting average, 27 home runs, 73 RBIs, and an MLB-leading 58 doubles. Castellanos' 58 doubles were the tenth-highest single-season total in MLB history and the most by any player since Todd Helton's 59 doubles in 2000, earning him the nickname "Nicky Two Bags." He also joined Hall of Famers Hank Greenberg (1934) and Joe Medwick (1937) as the only right-handed batters to ever hit 55 doubles and 25 home runs in the same season.

On defense in 2019, he posted −9 defensive runs saved, the worst in the major leagues among right fielders, and −4.4 ultimate zone rating, second worst.

=== Cincinnati Reds ===
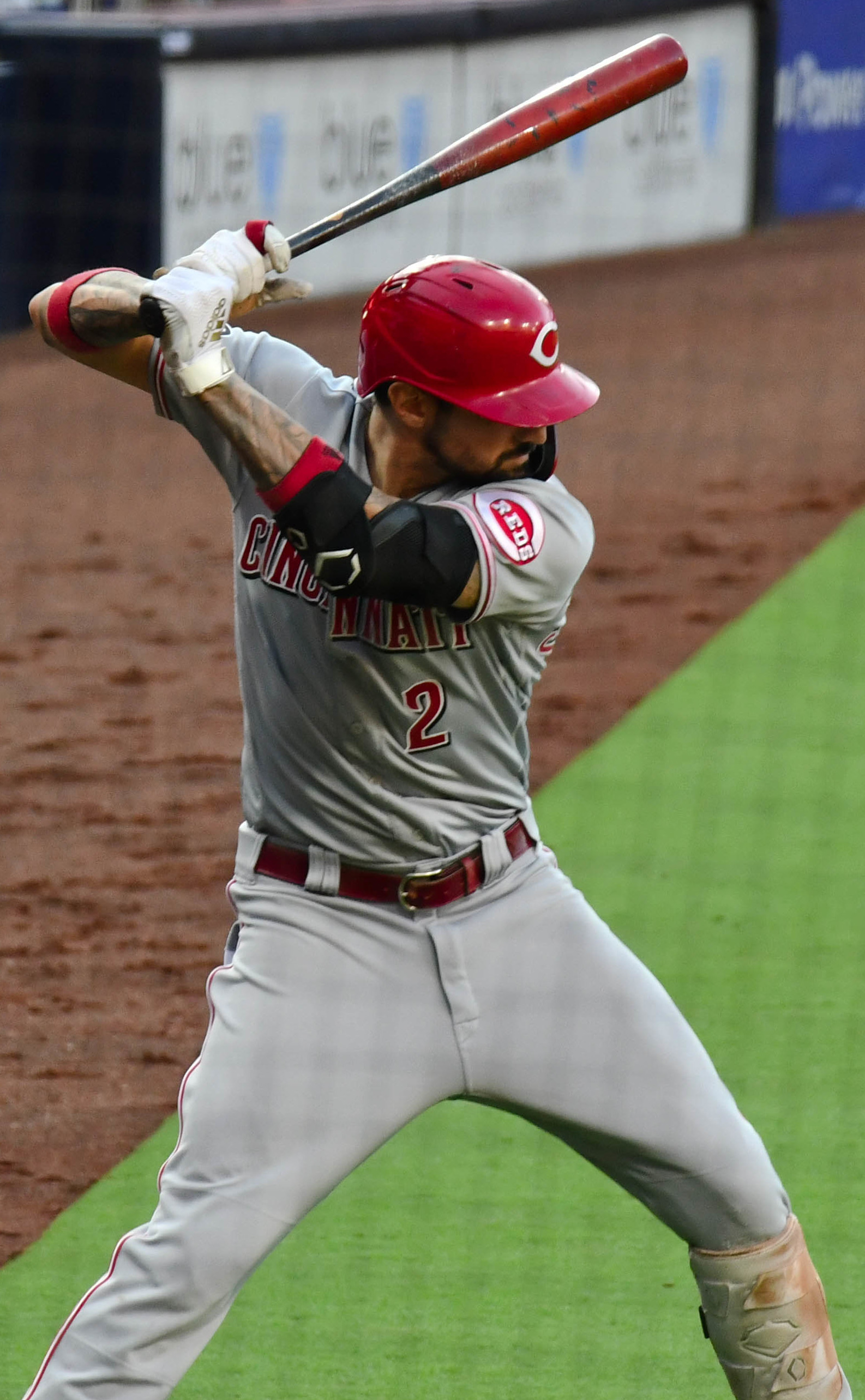
Castellanos with the Reds in 2021

Castellanos signed a four-year, $64 million contract with the Cincinnati Reds on January 27, 2020. The contract included an opt-out clause. In a 2020 season shortened by the COVID-19 pandemic, he hit just .225, with 14 home runs and 34 RBI in 60 games. On defense, Castellanos had a fielding percentage of .963, the lowest among all major league right fielders, with −4 defensive runs saved and a −3.0 ultimate zone rating.

On August 19, 2020, during the opening game of a doubleheader in Kauffman Stadium, Reds broadcaster Thom Brennaman was apologizing for a homophobic slur he uttered on a hot mic earlier in the broadcast. Mid-apology, Castellanos hit a home run, and Brennaman broke from his apology to deliver the play-by-play. Brennaman said, "I pride myself and think of myself as a man of faith, as there's a drive into deep left field by Castellanos, it will be a home run. And so that'll make it a 4–0 ballgame." The moment, as well as future instances of Castellanos recording hits during broadcast discussions of negative events, became an internet meme as a copypasta. ESPN's Pablo Torre later said it "was like listening to the band play on as the Titanic was sinking. Except the band was also somehow the iceberg." On July 5, 2021, Castellanos hit a home run at Kauffman Stadium while the Kansas City Royals' broadcast was in the middle of a eulogy for a military veteran.

Castellanos earned his first All-Star selection in 2021. By season's end, Castellanos had posted career highs in batting average (.309) and home runs (34), while driving in 100 runs. It was his second career 100-RBI season and first since 2017. Defensively, he posted an improved fielding percentage of .991, having committed only three errors, but also had −4 defensive runs saved and a −4.5 ultimate zone rating.

Castellanos opted out of his contract after the 2021 season, becoming a free agent.

=== Philadelphia Phillies ===
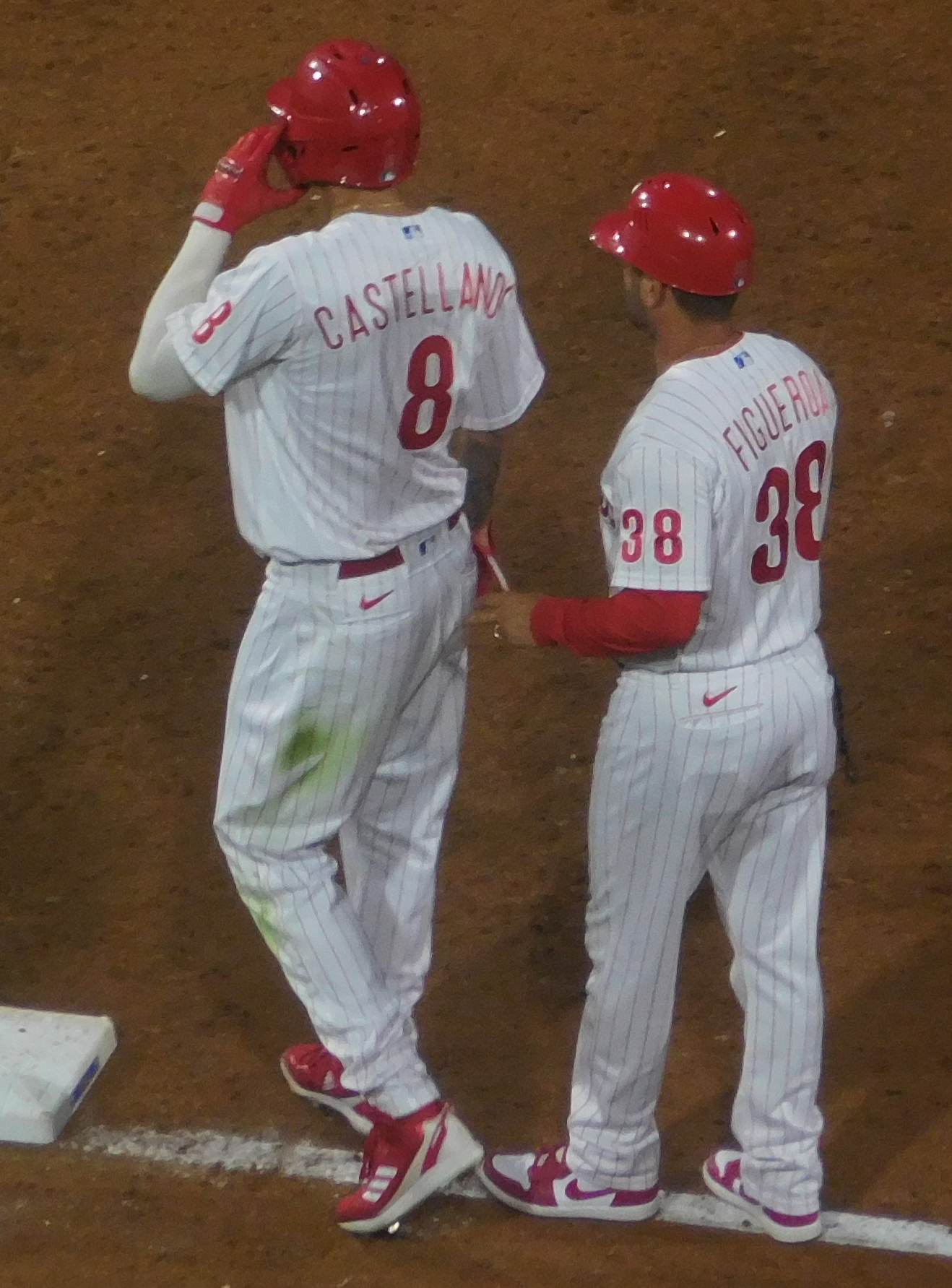
Castellanos on first base with the Phillies in 2022

On March 22, 2022, the Philadelphia Phillies signed Castellanos to a five-year, $100 million contract.

Castellanos again interrupted a broadcast moment in a spring training game against the Toronto Blue Jays on March 27, when he recorded his first hit as a Philly while the Blue Jays broadcast team was discussing the DUI arrest of Toronto pitching coach Pete Walker two days earlier. On Memorial Day, Castellanos hit a home run just as broadcaster Tom McCarthy had finished telling viewers about the American Gold Star Mothers Chair of Honor in Citizens Bank Park.

In 2022, Castellanos batted .263/.305/.389 in 524 at–bats. He swung at 57.0% of all pitches, the highest percentage of all major league batters. Castellanos was the final out of the 2022 World Series, fouling out to Houston Astros right fielder Kyle Tucker to end game 6 and clinch the series for the Astros.

In the 2023 National League Division Series, Castellanos hit two home runs in each of Games 3 and 4, becoming the first player in MLB history to hit multiple home runs in consecutive postseason games. In Game 1 of the 2023 National League Championship Series, Castellanos hit a home run in his first plate appearance, joining Reggie Jackson as the only players in postseason history to hit five home runs in a three-game span. However, he went hitless with 11 strikeouts in his final 23 at-bats as the Phillies lost in seven games to the Arizona Diamondbacks despite having held a 2–0 series lead.

Castellanos played in all 162 games for the Phillies in 2024, slashing .254/.311/.431 with 23 home runs, 86 RBI, and six stolen bases.

On June 17, 2025, Castellanos was benched in the second game of the Phillies' series against the Miami Marlins due to "inappropriate" comments, ending his streak of games started at 236. It was later revealed that he had brought a beer into the dugout and criticized manager Rob Thomson and the coaches after being removed from the previous day's game.

Later in the season, Castellanos lost playing time, entering a platoon with Max Kepler. On September 19, Castellanos hit his 250th career home run. Castellanos played in 147 games for the Phillies in 2025, slashing .250/.294/.400 with 17 home runs, 72 RBI, and four stolen bases.

Following the 2025 season, the Phillies unsuccessfully looked to trade Castellanos over the offseason after reports indicated that his relationship with Thomson had deteriorated following the benching incident during the prior season. On February 12, 2026, Castellanos was released by the Phillies after four seasons with the team, with the Phillies still owing Castellanos $20 million for the 2026 season.

=== San Diego Padres ===
On February 15, 2026, Castellanos signed a one-year contract with the San Diego Padres. The Padres intended to utilize him as a first baseman and designated hitter, with some playing time in the corner outfield. He batted .191 with four home runs in 39 games before being designated for assignment on June 3, when he was scheduled to play against the Philadelphia Phillies, his former team. Castellanos was released by the Padres on June 5.

== Personal life ==
Castellanos has a son who was born in August 2013. He married his high school sweetheart, Vanessa Hernandez, the mother of his son, in 2015. They divorced in 2017. Castellanos started dating Jessica Gomez in 2017 and they married on February 8, 2021. Their son was born in May 2022. Castellanos' third son was born in May 2025.

Castellanos' younger brother, Ryan, played college baseball for Nova Southeastern University. The Tigers selected Ryan in the 25th round of the 2015 MLB draft, with Nick himself announcing the pick. In 2017, their father was diagnosed with brain cancer.

== See also ==
- List of Major League Baseball career home run leaders
