= Copypasta =

Block of text copied and pasted across the Internet

A copypasta is a block of text copied and pasted to the Internet and social media. Copypasta containing controversial ideas or lengthy rants are often posted for humorous purposes, to provoke reactions from those unaware that the posted text is an Internet meme.

== Etymology ==
The term copypasta is derived from the computer interface term "copy and paste", the act of selecting a piece of text and copying it elsewhere. Usage of the word can be traced to an anonymous 4chan thread from 2006. Merriam-Webster recorded it as appearing on Usenet and Urban Dictionary for the first time that year.

== Examples ==
=== Navy Seal ===
The Navy Seal copypasta, also sometimes known as Gorilla Warfare due to a misspelling of "guerrilla warfare" in its contents, is an aggressive but humorous paragraph supposedly written by an extremely well-trained member of the United States Navy SEALs to an unidentified "kiddo". Written in a manner similar to a non-serious death threat, the author threatens the recipient while boasting of their own increasingly absurd or unfeasible accomplishments, such as having "over 300 confirmed kills" or being able to kill someone "in over seven hundred ways, and that's just with my bare hands". This copypasta is often reposted as a humorous overreaction to an insult and is thought to have originated on the military-themed imageboard OperatorChan, although the earliest known usage of the copypasta was on 4chan on November 11, 2010.

In 2019, the copypasta appeared in the alleged manifesto of Brenton Tarrant, the perpetrator of the Christchurch mosque shootings. Some media outlets reported the copypasta as fact, for example publishing that Tarrant was "a navy seal with over 300 confirmed kills".

=== Bee Movie ===
According to all known laws of aviation, there is no way that a bee should be able to fly. Its wings are too small to get its fat little body off the ground. The bee, of course, flies anyway because bees don't care what humans think is impossible.

— Portion of the introductory monologue of Bee Movie

The Bee Movie copypasta is the entire screenplay of the 2007 animated film Bee Movie, though this is sometimes shortened to just the introductory monologue. Use of the Bee Movie's script as a copypasta began in 2013, when users posted it onto websites such as Reddit and Tumblr, and it was popularized when edits of the film were first uploaded to YouTube in late 2016.

=== "A drive into deep left field by Castellanos" ===
"A drive into deep left field by Castellanos" is a quote from Thom Brennaman, an American sports commentator for the Major League Baseball team the Cincinnati Reds. The quote and copypasta originated during a broadcast of a game between the Cincinnati Reds and the Kansas City Royals on 19 August 2020, when Brennaman uttered a homophobic slur on a hot mic. When he was apologizing later in the broadcast, Reds player Nick Castellanos hit a home run, prompting Brennaman to deliver a play-by-play in the middle of his apology, saying: "I pride myself and think of myself as a man of faith, as there's a drive into deep left field by Castellanos, it will be a home run. And so that'll make it a 4–0 ballgame". ESPN's Pablo Torre later remarked that it "was like listening to the band play on as the Titanic was sinking. Except the band was also somehow the iceberg."

== Legal implications ==
While most copypastas are meant to be humorous as memes, some have been used to propagate certain ideas or even change public opinion. In a noted 2024 case from the Philippines, Filipino actor Mon Confiado filed a cyberlibel complaint against a content creator who posted the "Flying Lotus" copypasta, substituting Flying Lotus with the actor's name. The copypasta narrates an encounter with a well-known person behaving badly in a grocery store.

== Technology ==
In computing, copypasta can refer to a piece of code that was copied and pasted. Discussions of copypasta can be found in the code history of Linux, such as a 2013 comment describing code which "very much looks like copypasta" (suggesting it was not originally authored) and correction of a "copypasta mistake" where code was copied and not correctly amended.

== See also ==
- Creepypasta – Horror-related media shared around the Internet
- Chain letter – Letter written in succession by a group of people
- Faxlore – Urban legends that spread via fax machine
- Know Your Meme – Website and video series on memes
- Running gag – Literary device
- Snowclone – Cliché used as a pattern for other expressions
- Shitposting – Intentionally posting poor-quality social media posts
- Spamming – Unsolicited electronic messages, especially advertisements
- Trolling – Deliberately making offensive remarks online
