= Ryan M. Milner =

American media studies scholar

Ryan M. Milner is an American media studies scholar and professor of communication at the College of Charleston. His research focuses on internet culture, digital media, online interaction, and the social and political role of participatory media.

== Education and career ==
Milner received a Ph.D. in communication from the University of Kansas. His dissertation, completed in 2012, was titled The World Made Meme: Discourse and Identity in Participatory Media. A revised book version was published by MIT Press in 2016 as The World Made Meme: Public Conversations and Participatory Media.

At the College of Charleston, Milner is professor and chair of the Department of Communication. His teaching includes courses on digital media, media ethics, and audio investigations.

== Work ==
Milner's work examines internet memes, participatory media, online antagonism, and networked public discourse. His book The World Made Meme analyzes internet memes as a form of public conversation and participatory expression. The book was also reviewed in journals including New Media & Society and Asiascape: Digital Asia.

With Whitney Phillips, Milner co-authored The Ambivalent Internet: Mischief, Oddity, and Antagonism Online, published by Polity in 2017. The book examines online expression that moves between play, humor, hostility, and political participation. It was reviewed in journals including Journalism & Mass Communication Quarterly, Global Media and Communication, and Information, Communication & Society.

Phillips and Milner later co-authored You Are Here: A Field Guide for Navigating Polarized Speech, Conspiracy Theories, and Our Polluted Media Landscape, published by MIT Press in 2021. The book was reviewed in New Media & Society. In 2023, Phillips and Milner published the young-adult media-literacy book Share Better and Stress Less: A Guide to Thinking Ecologically about Social Media with MITeen Press.

== Selected publications ==
=== Books ===
- Milner, Ryan M. (2016). The World Made Meme: Public Conversations and Participatory Media. MIT Press. doi:10.7551/mitpress/9780262034999.001.0001. ISBN 978-0-262-03499-9.
- Phillips, Whitney; Milner, Ryan M. (2017). The Ambivalent Internet: Mischief, Oddity, and Antagonism Online. Polity. ISBN 978-1-5095-0127-4.
- Phillips, Whitney; Milner, Ryan M. (2021). You Are Here: A Field Guide for Navigating Polarized Speech, Conspiracy Theories, and Our Polluted Media Landscape. MIT Press. doi:10.7551/mitpress/12436.001.0001. ISBN 978-0-262-53991-3.
- Phillips, Whitney; Milner, Ryan M. (2023). Share Better and Stress Less: A Guide to Thinking Ecologically about Social Media. MITeen Press. ISBN 978-1-5362-2874-8.

=== Articles ===
- Milner, Ryan M. (2009). "Working for the Text: Fan Labor and the New Organization". International Journal of Cultural Studies. 12 (5): 491–508. doi:10.1177/1367877909337861. S2CID 145326966.
- Milner, Ryan M. (2013). "Contested Convergence and the Politics of Play on GameTrailers.com". Games and Culture. 8 (1): 3–25. doi:10.1177/1555412013478684. S2CID 147294306.
- Milner, Ryan M. (2013). "Pop Polyvocality: Internet Memes, Public Participation, and the Occupy Wall Street Movement". International Journal of Communication. 7: 2357–2390.
- Milner, Ryan M. (2013). "FCJ-156 Hacking the Social: Internet Memes, Identity Antagonism, and the Logic of Lulz". The Fibreculture Journal (22).
