= Annie Sabo =

American journalist

- Born: Cincinnati, Ohio, U.S.
- Education: University of Michigan
- Occupation: Sports journalist
- Employer(s): Big Ten Network; Bally Sports Ohio

Annie Sabo is a sports reporter and former anchor for Bally Sports North, currently with the Big Ten Network. She covered the Minnesota Twins and the Minnesota Timberwolves. She hosted the Pre-Game and Post-Game shows for both teams. She later joined Bally Sports Ohio to cover the Cincinnati Reds, her father Chris's former team.

== Early life and family ==
Sabo was born and raised in Cincinnati, Ohio. Her father is Chris Sabo, a three-time All-Star and 1990 World Series Champion with the Cincinnati Reds and former manager of the University of Akron baseball team. She grew up playing soccer and tennis. She has two sisters, Brooke and Olivia. Her father suggested to her to go into sports broadcasting.

== College and career ==
She passed on several Tennis scholarships including one at the University of Dayton to enroll at her Father's Alma mater University of Michigan where she graduated in 2015. She got her first TV job at KRIS in Corpus Christi, Texas and was there for two years before going to WFLA-TV in Tampa, Florida where she also worked there for two years before going joining Bally Sports North. While at WFLA-TV, she traveled to Pyeongchang, South Korea to cover the 2018 Winter Olympics and worked with Steve Andrews whose daughter Erin Andrews inspired Sabo to become a sportscaster. In 2019, she became host of Wolves Live replacing Tom Hanneman. In July 2021, Sabo announced she was leaving Bally Sports North to move back to Florida to be closer to her family and to prepare for her wedding. Shortly after leaving Bally Sports North, she joined the Big Ten Network working as a part of B1G Tailgate show for the 2021 season. In 2022, she added pre-game and post-game duties to cover her dad's old team the Reds for Bally Sports Ohio after an Opening Day appearance.

== Personal life ==
Sabo is married to professional golfer Kevin Roy.
