= Hot mic =

Microphone that is inadvertently left on

A hot mic, sometimes referred to as an open microphone or (in aviation) a stuck mic, is, in general, an apparent error in which a microphone is switched on or remains on, especially without the speaker realizing.

A special case of hot mic is the microphone gaffe, in which the microphone is actively collecting and transmitting sound gathered near a subject who is unaware that their remarks are being transmitted and recorded, allowing unintended listeners or viewers to hear parts of conversations not intended for public consumption. Such errors usually involve live broadcasting in radio or television, and sometimes material is recorded and played back via media outlets. Such events can cause embarrassment for the person or organization involved, sometimes resulting in serious confrontations and employment termination.

== Notable microphone gaffes ==
=== Television broadcasts ===
- In 1996, during a live taping of World Championship Wrestling's Clash of the Champions, Brian Pillman, during his match with Eddie Guerrero, grabbed ringside commentator Bobby Heenan's jacket collar from behind, causing Heenan to yell "What the fuck are you doing?" Heenan later apologized for his outburst.
- In 1999, during a cricket test match between Australia and Pakistan, Australian Scott Muller misfielded a ball and a voice was heard saying, "Can't bowl, can't throw." Teammate Shane Warne was suspected, but a cameraman confessed.
- On 22 June 2000, Australian newsreader Marie-Louise Theile was recorded as calling her husband an "arsehole" during what she thought was a commercial break on Ten News in Brisbane.
- During television coverage of the 2000 Canadian federal election, a CBC Television producer covering Stockwell Day's campaign was heard on-air making a gratuitous comment about the breasts of Juliana Thiessen-Day, candidate Day's daughter-in-law. His words were cut off mid-sentence: "This is Logan Day's wife. I've never met her, but apparently she's got tits that'd stop a—" The producer was forced to apologize.
- After a defeat for Chelsea F.C. in April 2004, former British football manager and commentator Ron Atkinson said of Chelsea defender Marcel Desailly: "He is what is known in some schools as a fucking lazy thick nigger." The microphone was open to some countries in the Middle East, with UK broadcasts having already finished. Atkinson was forced to resign his position at ITV and left his role as a columnist at The Guardian by mutual agreement.
- In September 2005, during a filming of Access Hollywood, Donald Trump and Billy Bush had "an extremely lewd conversation about women" where Trump said "when you're a star, they let you do it. You can do anything ... grab them by the pussy". When The Washington Post broke the story during the 2016 presidential election, in which Trump was the Republican nominee, several dozen Republicans renounced their support of Trump.
- A series of technical problems on 9 March 2006 forced ESPN2 to switch from its SportsCenter broadcast to that of ESPNews. Caught unprepared by the move, ESPNews broadcaster Danyelle Sargent struggled for words, forcing fellow anchor Robert Flores to finish her sentence. After the broadcast cut to taped footage, Sargent was heard exclaiming "What the fuck was that?"
- On 8 August 2006, Network Ten sports commentator Dean Jones said "the terrorist has got another wicket" when Proteas fielder Hashim Amla (the first player from a Muslim background to play test cricket for South Africa) caught Kumar Sangakkara during a match between South Africa and Sri Lanka. Jones claimed he thought the microphone was off and made prompt formal apologies, but was dismissed from his post.
- On 29 August 2006, American news channel CNN was broadcasting a live Hurricane Katrina anniversary speech from President George W. Bush when the microphone of anchor Kyra Phillips was left on. Around 90 seconds of her casual conversation with another woman was broadcast over CNN's coverage of Bush's speech. During the conversation she discussed her husband, whom she called "a really passionate, compassionate, great, great human being," and her sister-in-law, whom she called a "control freak." CNN apologized to viewers and the White House.
- In August 2007, Australian journalist Kerry O'Brien, presenter of the Australian Broadcasting Corporation's The 7.30 Report, was recorded criticising his production staff for a mishap with the teleprompter while a story was running.
- On 12 May 2008, as a live news teaser was played, Sue Simmons was reportedly heard angrily exclaiming to a co-worker (later revealed to be Chuck Scarborough), "What the fuck are you doing?" She later apologized on-air for her inappropriate language. Simmons has said she was attempting to get the attention of Scarborough, who was preoccupied with his computer, but did not realize her microphone was still on.
- On 2 March 2009, footage of Dutch news anchor Eva Jinek asking whether to loosen another button on her shirt (which might reveal too much of her cleavage) right before a broadcast, while muttering and shouting mild curses in both English and Dutch, was accidentally leaked to and spread on the Internet. She exclaims "Yeah, boobies!" at one point, continuing with, "Mother of God. Yeah, if you have it, flaunt it!" and citing her mother who might tell her: "I can see your breasts!" She responded the next day, saying she was not annoyed nor embarrassed by the leaked video.
- Veteran Sky Sports presenters Richard Keys and Andy Gray made remarks that a female referee would not understand the complex offside football rule. This controversy led to Gray being fired and Keys resigning.
- During a National Football League (NFL) game on 18 December 2011 between the Cincinnati Bengals and the St. Louis Rams, Rams offensive lineman Harvey Dahl was assessed a penalty for holding, prompting him to exclaim, "I know you didn't call me for holding! That's not fucking holding!" The remark was picked up by the open microphone of official Jerome Boger as he was announcing the holding penalty, and was heard by the stadium and the television audience. Dahl was given an additional penalty for unsportsmanlike conduct, but was not fined by the league.
- During an NFL game between the Miami Dolphins and Indianapolis Colts in 2012, during a play that produced a penalty flag, referee Tony Corrente was heard over the loudspeakers of Lucas Oil Stadium saying to a fellow official "that was goddammit!", leading to play-by-play announcer Kevin Harlan making a public apology on-air, saying "he didn't know his microphone was on."
- After the ABC's 2014 New Year's Eve telecast of the Sydney fireworks had finished, host Julia Zemiro was caught saying "Oh, thank God".
- During a telecast of the 2016 Summer Olympics, CBC commentator Byron MacDonald was caught making an off-hand remark to a colleague discussing the result of the women's 4 × 200 m freestyle swimming relay, stating that a Chinese swimmer "went out like stink, [and] died like a pig." MacDonald and the CBC apologized for the incident.
- In 2020, during a game between the Cincinnati Reds and Kansas City Royals, American broadcaster Thom Brennaman was caught on air calling an unidentified city (which was later revealed to be about San Francisco) "one of the fag capitals of the world." Brennaman apologized on-air and left the broadcast in the middle of the second game of the doubleheader; the apology later became an internet meme after Brennaman suddenly interrupted himself to announce that Reds player Nick Castellanos had hit a home run. Jim Day provided commentary after the top of the fifth inning, and Brennaman was suspended after the game's end.
- On 12 January 2022, a leaked Seven News video showed Australian TV presenter Rebecca Maddern saying that "Whatever way you look at it, Novak Djokovic is a lying, sneaky, asshole. He got a bullshit fucking excuse and then fell over his own fucking lies" in relation to the 2022 Australian Open vaccine and visa controversy.
- On 19 October 2022, during a live broadcast of an episode of What Does It Mean on Russian news channel RBC-TV, defense expert Ruslan Pukhov told a TV host that "Everyone knows they [drones] are from Iran but the government doesn't admit that" even before being asked to comment on official Russian authorities' denial of the Iranian origin of the Shahed 136 UCAVs used in Russian attacks on Ukrainian territory during the 2022 Russian invasion of Ukraine. Pukhov also used the catchphrase "the arse exists, but the word doesn't!" from a famous Russian joke to emphasize the absurdity of this situation.

=== Political ===
- At the height of the Cold War in 1984, U.S. president Ronald Reagan was about to appear on a radio interview and, as a soundcheck, said "My fellow Americans, I'm pleased to tell you today that I've signed legislation that will outlaw Russia forever. We begin bombing in five minutes." The comment, while not actually broadcast, did eventually spread via rumor around the world before the audio itself leaked. The moment was even acknowledged by the Soviet government, who expressed their contempt at the joke.
- On 16 February 1988, NBC Nightly News anchor Tom Brokaw was finishing up an interview with incumbent vice-president George H. W. Bush following Bush's victory in the New Hampshire primary that day before interviewing Kansas senator and Senate Minority Leader Bob Dole. Bush closed the interview by wishing Dole and his fellow Republicans good luck in the upcoming Super Tuesday contests. Brokaw then turned to Dole - who following his win in the Iowa caucus the previous week had been slammed by the Bush campaign as being willing to raise taxes - for a response only for Dole to blurt out, "Yeah, stop lying about my record". Dole's campaign never fully recovered, as he would only win a handful of contests in his native Midwestern region before dropping out after the Illinois primary, while Bush would go on to win the Republican nomination and ultimately the general election.
- On 16 February 1993, U.S. president Bill Clinton snapped at an aide "Listen, goddamn it. Come here. You can't do that. You can't take me out here with a mayor and a congresswoman and push them back" after a member of his staff tried to prevent District of Columbia Mayor Sharon Pratt Kelly and Congresswoman Eleanor Holmes Norton from joining the president walking to a porch for a photo opportunity with construction workers.
- In 1993, British Prime Minister John Major, after an interview with ITN political editor Michael Brunson, forgot about the recording equipment. He said it was pointless expelling Eurosceptic Cabinet members as "we don't want another three more of the bastards out there."
- Following the 1994 State of the Union Address, Ohio congressman Martin Hoke was preparing to be interviewed for a live broadcast for a local Cleveland television station. After being outfitted with a microphone by a female producer, Hoke remarked to another congressman that "She's got ze beega breasts" in a mock Italian accent. Although not broadcast live, the remark was recorded and was the subject of a report by The Washington Post the following day.
- In 1997, Prime Minister of Canada Jean Chretien was overheard at a NATO summit in Madrid while talking with his counterparts from Belgium and Luxembourg saying that U.S. politicians would all be in jail if they worked in Canada or elsewhere, as they all sold their votes.
- Just before a campaign speech during his 2000 presidential campaign, George W. Bush described New York Times reporter Adam Clymer as a "major league asshole" to his running mate Dick Cheney, whose response ("big time") was also audible. The media reaction was intense, with news stations repeatedly broadcasting it and the New York Post running two pages about the incident. Bush said of the incident: "I regret that a private comment I made to the vice-presidential candidate made it onto the public airwaves. I regret everybody heard what I said."
- During a televised debate between U.S. presidential candidates George W. Bush and Al Gore during the 2000 presidential campaign, Gore's sighs (in response to some of Bush's statements) were heard through Gore's live microphone. In regard to the incident, Gore was quoted as saying "Both the governor and I have learned lessons about when the microphone is on, and when it's off."
- On 11 March 2004, following a satellite address to the AFL–CIO, U.S. presidential candidate John Kerry turned to one of the union workers he was standing near and said "Oh yeah, don't worry man. We're going to keep pounding, let me tell you—we're just beginning to fight here. These guys are the most crooked, you know, lying group of people I've ever seen." Although being removed by an assistant at the time, Kerry's microphone was still live and captured his statement. His words were presumed to be directed at his political rivals, the U.S. Republican Party and U.S. President George W. Bush. Kerry spokesman David Wade later claimed that Kerry was indeed aware that his microphone was recording and was not referring to Republicans in general but to their use of "crooked, deceitful, personal attacks over the last four years."
- In 2005, French president Jacques Chirac was heard criticizing British cuisine to Russian President Vladimir Putin and German Chancellor Gerhard Schroeder, saying "The only thing that they have ever done for European agriculture is mad cow disease" and "You can't trust people who cook as badly as that." He was also heard criticizing haggis, saying "that's where our problems with NATO come from", and that British food was the second worst "after Finland".
- In February 2006, then-Premier of the Australian state of New South Wales Morris Iemma, referring to the recently appointed CEO of Cross City Tunnel said at a Council of Australian Governments (COAG) meeting during a break with Victorian Premier Steve Bracks "Today? This fuckwit who's the new CEO of the Cross City Tunnel has ... been saying what controversy? There is no controversy,".
- On 1 July 2006, a technician did not turn off the audio feed during a closed-door lunch between U.S. Secretary of State Condoleezza Rice and Russian Foreign Minister Sergei Lavrov amongst others. Journalists, on listening to the 20-minute broadcast, referred to the conversation as "bickering" about the Iraqi aid programme.
- On 17 July 2006, a private conversation, afterwards known as "Yo, Blair", between U.S. president George W. Bush and British prime minister Tony Blair at the G8 Summit in St. Petersburg was picked up by a nearby microphone. Bush told Blair he hoped the UN would "get Syria to get Hezbollah to stop doing this shit and it's all over" (referring to Syria's influence over and support of Hezbollah in the 2006 conflict between Israel and Hezbollah in Lebanon), and that by doing so, the crisis would be over. This was reaffirmed by the suggestion to "get Kofi [Annan] on the phone with [Bashar] Assad and make something happen." He also stated that Condoleezza Rice would visit the area.
- On 19 October 2006, during an official meeting with Israeli prime minister Ehud Olmert in Moscow, Russian president Vladimir Putin was overheard praising Israeli president Moshe Katsav for raping ten employees of his office.
- Before a Fox News interview on 6 July 2008, a live microphone picked up Jesse Jackson whispering to a fellow guest: "See, Barack's been, ah, talking down to black people on this faith-based. ... I want to cut his nuts out. ... Barack, he's talking down to black people" in an apparent response to Democratic presidential candidate Barack Obama's recent speeches on values.
- In March 2010, Joe Biden described the Affordable Care Act as "a big fucking deal" to President Obama, which was picked up by the microphones.
- On 28 April 2010, British prime minister Gordon Brown was caught on microphone describing an encounter with a female voter as a "disaster" and called her a "bigoted woman".
- In June 2010, US Republican Senate nominee from California Carly Fiorina criticised the hair of her Democratic opponent, Barbara Boxer when she did not realise her microphone was on during an interview for CNN. There was popular question as to whether this was staged as an attempt to undermine respect for Boxer, or whether it was an honest mistake.
- On 8 November 2011, a private conversation between French president Nicolas Sarkozy and U.S. president Barack Obama was overheard criticizing Israeli prime minister Benjamin Netanyahu. Sarkozy branded Netanyahu as a 'liar' and Obama expressed his displeasure with having to deal with Netanyahu on a regular basis.
- On 26 March 2012, at the tail end of his 90-minute meeting with the outgoing Russian president Dmitry Medvedev, President Obama said that he would have "more flexibility" to deal with controversial issues such as missile defense. He was heard telling Medvedev, "On all these issues, but particularly missile defense, this, this can be solved but it's important for him [Vladimir Putin] to give me space." Medvedev told the president in English, "Yeah, I understand. I understand your message about space. Space for you..." and President Obama continued his statement with, "This is my last election. After my election I have more flexibility." Medvedev responded saying, again in English, "I understand. I will transmit this information to Vladimir." (See also the US missile defense complex in Poland.)
- On 11 September 2015, Australian immigration minister Peter Dutton shared a joke with Prime Minister Tony Abbott, referring to a late meeting as running to "Cape York time", and when Abbott replied that "We had a bit of that up in Port Moresby.", Dutton responded with "Time doesn't mean anything when you're about to have water lapping at your door."—a reference to sea level rise in the Pacific islands. Social services minister Scott Morrison then drew their attention to the boom microphone above their heads.
- On 25 July 2017, following a United States Senate Appropriations subcommittee meeting, Maine senator Susan Collins was caught making disparaging statements about Texas congressman Blake Farenthold. Collins, talking to Rhode Island senator Jack Reed, asks him if he heard about Farenthold wanting to challenge her to a duel. Reed asserts that the congressman did so because Collins "could beat the shit out of him." She then goes on to call Farenthold a "fat guy, he huge" and "so unattractive, it's unbelievable" and references a photo of the congressman at a costume party in pajamas next to a "Playboy bunny." Farenthold had previously apologized to Collins for his comments about Collins, and the senator, in turn, apologized to Farenthold for hers.
- On 4 December 2019, at a reception at Buckingham Palace after a NATO leaders summit in Watford, Britain, Canadian prime minister Justin Trudeau, UK Prime Minister Boris Johnson, French president Emmanuel Macron, Dutch prime minister Mark Rutte, and Princess Anne were caught mocking and laughing at US president Donald Trump. Due to the loud talkative environment, what was audibly caught on camera was only a few seconds of footage from the long-lasting conversation but what was heard was Johnson asking Macron "Is that why you were late?" and Trudeau responding making fun of Trump's "impromptu" press conference earlier that morning in which Trump criticized Macron, "He [Macron] was late because he [Trump] takes a 40-minute press conference off the top." Trudeau further added, "You just watched his [Trump] team's jaws drop to the floor." The comments from Trudeau, who appeared very animated during the conference, prompted laughter from the other world leaders and later caused a media frenzy, leaving many to speculate what else was said about Trump. Trump was photographed afterwards appearing upset upon learning the news and later responded by saying "He's [Trudeau] two-faced... I find him to be a nice guy, but the truth is I called him out on the fact that he's not paying 2% [of national GDP towards defence] and I guess he's not very happy about it." Trump later had his own hot mics saying it was funny how he called him "two-faced".
- On 22 April 2020, Vaughan Gething, then the Minister for Health and Social Services in the Welsh Government, was caught swearing about fellow Labour Member of the Senedd Jenny Rathbone during a virtual session over Zoom. After Rathbone had asked the Minister a few questions about the Welsh Government's response to the COVID-19 pandemic, he failed to mute his microphone as he told an unknown person, "What the fuck is the matter with her?". Some undisclosed Labour MSs contacted by BBC Wales said they were also "very angry" over Gething's actions.
- On 2 June 2020, while asking Bronx Borough President Ruben Diaz Jr. if he could speak at a news conference, New York Representative Eliot Engel was caught telling Diaz that "if I didn't have a primary, I wouldn't care" about speaking at the event. The comments were criticized by Engel's primary opponent, Jamaal Bowman. Bowman later defeated Engel in the primary election.
- On 21 August 2020, at a virtual Senate hearing about the 2020 United States Postal Service crisis, Senator Tom Carper, apparently speaking to an aide, said "fuck, fuck, fuck," while his microphone was unmuted.
- On 14 September 2021, during a Singaporean parliamentary session where free trade agreements and the India–Singapore Comprehensive Economic Cooperation Agreement were being debated, Minister for Foreign Affairs Vivian Balakrishnan was caught referring to Non-constituency Member of Parliament Leong Mun Wai as "illiterate" in a private conversation with his colleagues. Balakrishnan also questioned how Leong was able to enter Raffles Institution. Balakrishnan subsequently apologised to Leong in private for the remarks.
- On 16 September 2021, during a session in the lower house of Congress, Brazilian federal deputy Igor Timo called the president of the Chamber of Deputies, Arthur Lira, a "son of a bitch". Attending the session remotely, and not realizing his microphone was recording, Igor said "He won't let me speak again. What a son of a bitch." After the president asked who said that, he went on to congratulate a fellow deputy for her work.
- On 24 January 2022, Fox News White House Correspondent Peter Doocy asked U.S. president Joe Biden if "inflation is a political liability in the midterms". Biden, not realizing his microphone was still on, sarcastically responded "It's a great asset — more inflation. What a stupid son of a bitch." Biden subsequently apologized.
- On 9 August 2022, following a hustings event being held during the UK Conservative Party leadership election, candidate Liz Truss and host Tom Newton Dunn were both picked up on their microphones, with Truss apologising for attacking the media during the event, and Newton Dunn replying with "it's cheap, and you know it".
- In September 2022, president of South Korea Yoon Suk-yeol was caught on a hot mic allegedly calling members of the US Congress "idiots" during a conversation about US president Joe Biden's plans to increase the American contribution to the Global Fund, a move which would require Congressional approval. A presidential spokeswoman denied that Yoon had made any reference to either Biden or the US Congress and that he was instead discussing South Korea's National Assembly.
- In December 2022, Prime Minister of New Zealand Jacinda Ardern was caught on a live microphone calling ACT New Zealand leader David Seymour "such an arrogant prick" after answering a question he had asked during a session of Parliament. Ardern's office later stated that she apologised to Seymour.
- On 11 July 2023, a video became viral, depicting Singaporean Speaker of Parliament Tan Chuan-Jin muttering the words "fucking populist" on 17 April 2023. He had been reacting to a speech made by Jamus Lim, a Workers' Party Member of Parliament (MP) for Sengkang Group Representation Constituency, which proposed the need for an "official poverty line" to help poor and disadvantaged Singaporeans, as well as equal opportunities for education, healthcare and employment.
- On 4 September 2023, following an interview with ITV about the closure of school buildings due to concerns over the use of reinforced autoclaved aerated concrete, British Secretary of State for Education Gillian Keegan was caught on a live mic remarking "does anyone ever say you've done a fucking good job because everyone else has sat on their fucking arse and done nothing?" before adding "Any sign of that, no?". A Downing Street source criticised the comments as "completely wrong" and Keegan later apologised for the "off-the-cuff" remarks, stating that they were caused by her irritation at the reporter and were not directed at anyone in particular.
- In September 2025, General Secretary of the Chinese Communist Party Xi Jinping and President of Russia Vladimir Putin were caught on a hot mic discussing organ transplantation as a means of artificially prolonging human life during a military parade in Beijing, with Xi reportedly telling Putin "with the development of biotechnology, human organs can be continuously transplanted, and people can live younger and younger, and even achieve immortality... predictions are, this century, there's a chance of also living to 150".

=== Other ===
- Britney Spears, about to go out in front of her largest ever concert audience in Rio de Janeiro in 2001, allegedly complained about the organization of her entourage, saying, "Don't tell me that they're just letting the audience just fucking stand out there like that. Oh my God! This is retarded." Her record company denied that it was Spears' voice that was broadcast to the 170,000 in attendance at the Maracanã.
- In March 2005, British King Charles III (then the Prince of Wales) was heard saying, "Bloody people. I can't stand that man [referring to BBC News royal correspondent Nicholas Witchell]. He's so awful, he really is." He was heard to say this while posing for photographers with his sons in Klosters, Switzerland.
- On 4 November 2010, radio host Don Imus was caught on a hot mic mocking an advertisement for the charity Kars4Kids during a commercial break, calling the singer of the jingle a "moron" and saying they should "go to hell". Imus apologized the next day for the gaffe.
- In 2020, British Prime Minister Boris Johnson's staff held a mock press conference before a press briefing, though cameras and microphones were on, where Johnson's press secretary claimed a business meeting they had at 10 Downing Street was actually a party and was not socially distanced, despite British COVID-19 regulations prohibiting such gatherings. The press secretary later resigned as a result when the footage was revealed in 2021.
- During a Philadelphia Flyers game in December 2025, Flyers radio announcer Tim Saunders made a sexually explicit comment over the air after indicating he thought that the broadcast would go to commercial. The Flyers suspended Saunders for the following two games; both the organization and broadcaster issued apologies through social media.

== See also ==
- Media relations
- Media strategy
- Public relations
