= Marty Brennaman =

American sportscaster (born 1942)

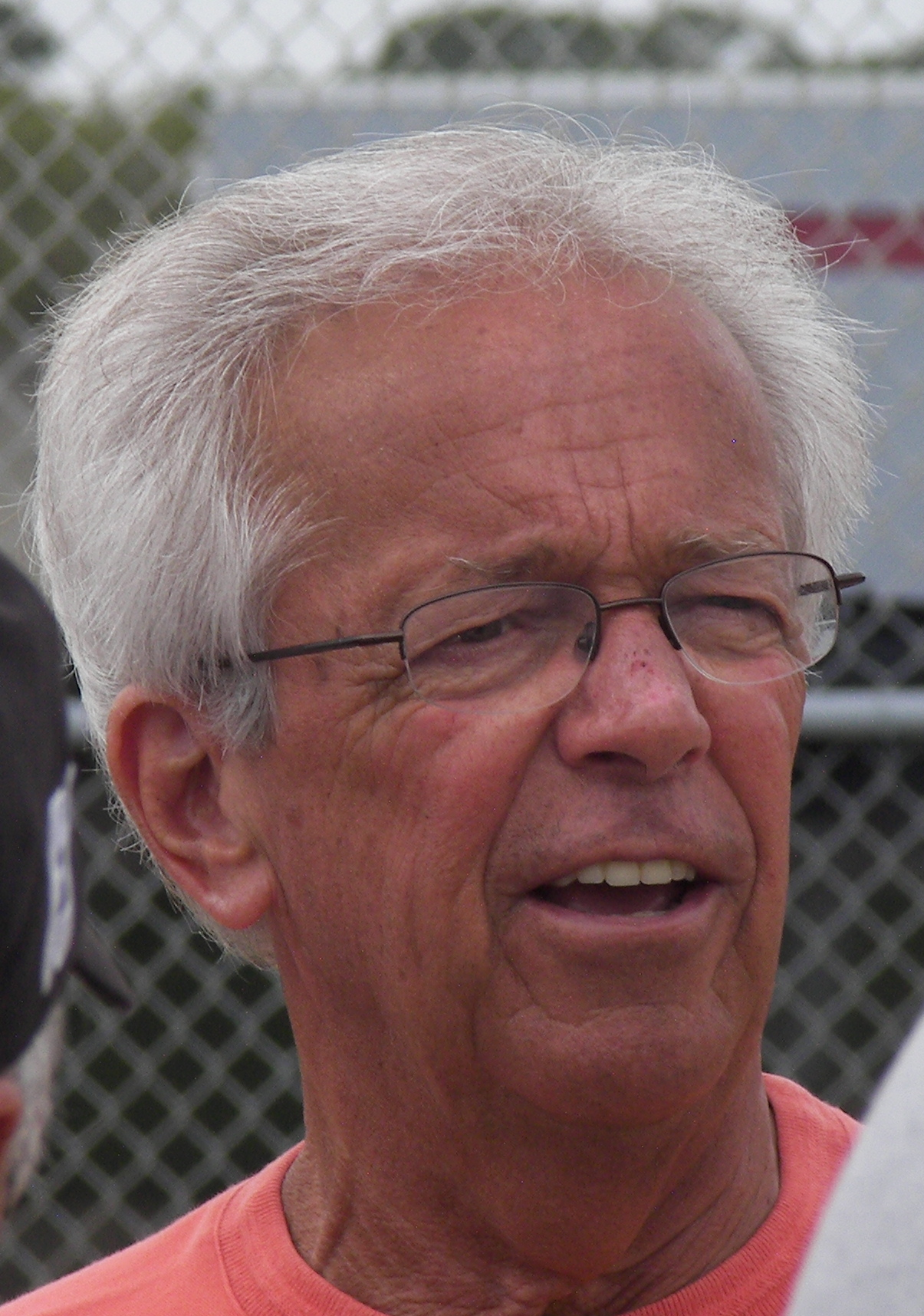
- Brennaman in 2008
- Born: Franchester Martin Brennaman; July 28, 1942 (age 84); Portsmouth, Virginia, U.S.
- Sports commentary career
- Team: Cincinnati Reds (1974–2019)
- Genre: Play-by-play
- Sport: Major League Baseball

Franchester Martin Brennaman (born July 28, 1942) is an American former sportscaster, best known for his long tenure as the play-by-play voice of Major League Baseball's Cincinnati Reds on the Cincinnati Reds Radio Network. Known for his opinionated, zealous, and occasionally contentious style, Brennaman called Reds games from 1974 to 2019.

== Early life ==
A native of Portsmouth, Virginia, Brennaman attended Randolph-Macon College and the University of North Carolina, graduating from the latter institution with a communications degree in 1965. He began his broadcasting career at WGHP-TV in High Point, North Carolina, and followed with stints in Salisbury, North Carolina and Norfolk, Virginia. From 1970 to 1974, he called games for the Virginia Squires of the American Basketball Association.

In 1971, Brennaman began his career as a baseball radio announcer for the Tidewater Tides (now Norfolk Tides), the then-New York Mets' affiliate in the International League (Class AAA).

For the 1972 football season, he called the radio play-by-play action for the William & Mary Indians (now nicknamed the Tribe).

In 1973, Virginia Tech athletic director Frank O. Moseley hired Brennaman to be the new voice of the Hokies. Brennaman was the first Tech broadcaster to call both football and basketball, but he left VT in 1974 to become the broadcaster for the Cincinnati Reds.

== Career ==
Brennaman joined Joe Nuxhall on the Reds radio team in 1974. "Marty and Joe" became an institution in the city, appearing together in numerous radio and television commercials. Brennaman's trademark call of a Reds victory ("And this one belongs to the Reds!") was coined during his second game with the team. This same phrase was expected to be placed in lights, outside of the Great American Ball Park in 2003, but Hamilton County officials nixed the idea, citing that the ballpark belongs to the taxpayers and not the team. Instead, only Nuxhall's signature signoff, "...Rounding third and heading for home." was used.

On January 16, 2019, Brennaman announced he would retire following the 2019 season. He broadcast his final Reds game on September 26, 2019.

=== Notable calls ===
- Hank Aaron's record-tying 714th career home run in 1974 (Brennaman's first regular season game as a Reds announcer)
- Tom Seaver's only career no-hitter in 1978 (when Seaver was a member of the Reds)
- Pete Rose's record-breaking 4,192nd career hit in 1985
- Tom Browning's perfect game in 1988
- Ken Griffey Jr.'s 500th career home run in 2004 and his 600th in 2008
- The Reds' World Series appearances in 1975, 1976, and 1990 (the first two for a nationwide audience on NBC television)
- Roy Halladay's no-hitter (second in postseason history) in game one of the 2010 NLDS between Cincinnati and Philadelphia.
- Jay Bruce's walk-off home run to clinch the NL Central divisional title for the Reds in 2010
- Homer Bailey's no-hitters against the Pirates in 2012 and against the Giants in 2013
- Jake Arrieta's no-hitter against the Reds in 2016

== Accolades ==
In 1999, Brennaman was inducted into the Virginia Sports Hall of Fame.

In 2000, Marty Brennaman won the Ford C. Frick Award, presented annually by the National Baseball Hall of Fame to a broadcaster "for major contributions to the game of baseball".

The National Sportscasters and Sportswriters Association (NSSA) has named Brennaman as Ohio Sportscaster of the Year 16 times and Virginia Sportscaster of the Year four times, for his versatility in calling baseball, football, and basketball games on both the collegiate and professional levels. In addition to the Virginia Squires and the Norfolk Tides, he has called games for the Indiana Pacers, Virginia Tech, and William and Mary, as well as NCAA men's basketball tournament games.

In 2005, Brennaman was inducted into both the NSSA Hall of Fame and the National Radio Hall of Fame.

On August 16, 2019, it was announced that Brennaman will be the only inductee to the Cincinnati Reds Hall Of Fame & Museum in 2020; the induction ceremony was scheduled to take place on April 26, 2020, but the ceremony eventually was pushed back to August 27, 2021, due to concerns related to the COVID-19 pandemic.

== Controversies ==
In 1988, Brennaman and Nuxhall appeared before National League President A. Bartlett Giamatti at the NL office, in New York City in regard to accusations that Brennaman incited the crowd to cause a delay of game after an altercation between Reds manager Pete Rose and umpire Dave Pallone. After Rose was ejected from the game and Brennaman criticized Pallone during the live radio broadcast, fans littered the field with debris, leading to a game delay. Brennaman had this to say regarding the incident.

"I still maintain we were right", Brennaman said. "I'll never apologize for that. They accused us of inciting a riot. I don't think we did then and I don't think we did now."

On June 12, 2007, Brennaman made an on-air apology during the Cincinnati Reds Radio Network broadcast for a comment he had recently made comparing an upcoming road trip to the Bataan Death March. The Reds, who at the time held the worst record in the National League, were set to face the Oakland Athletics, the Seattle Mariners and Philadelphia Phillies on the road trip.

On April 17, 2008, during the top of the eighth inning of a game between the Chicago Cubs and the Cincinnati Reds at Wrigley Field in Chicago, Brennaman made comments about Cubs fans and the Cubs team. This occurred after then-Reds player Adam Dunn connected for a home run. Several baseballs, including the home run ball, were thrown onto the field, resulting in a game delay as the field crew recovered the debris. Said Brennaman:

"This is the kind of thing, quite honestly, right now, that makes you want to see the Chicago Cubs team lose. Among all baseball fans, and I can't attest to the Yankees or Red Sox, because we don't see them with any degree of regularity unless it's inter-league play, but far and away the most obnoxious fans in baseball, in this league, are those who follow this team right here. Throwing 15 or 18 balls onto the field, there's absolutely no excuse for that, and that is so typical of Chicago Cubs fans. It's unbelievable."

"You simply root against 'em. Y'know, I've said all winter they talked about this team winning the division, and my comment is they won't win it, because at the end of the day, they still are the Chicago Cubs, and they will figure out a way to screw this whole thing up."

On April 18, 2008, Brennaman appeared in an interview on Chicago sports radio station WMVP-AM 1000 in which he reinforced his position on Cubs fans, and compared Chicago Cubs fans to rival St. Louis Cardinals fans.

"If they can't understand what happened Wednesday night was completely over the top, then I'm sorry", Brennaman said. "I said how tough it is to root for the Cubs. I think a lot of people feel the same way I do, but they won't articulate it. I'm not afraid to say what I think."

"[Compared to Cubs fans] Cardinals fans are hands down the best in baseball. They respect the game. They don't go to the game to do stupid stuff."

"The Cubs have some great baseball fans. But the ones who act like idiots (ruin) it for people like me."

On February 5, 2010, Brennaman was chastised for commenting that Marshall University's president must be "queer" for softball at the university's baseball banquet and fundraiser. Brennaman stated, "I probably could have made a better choice of words, but in no way does that reflect my opinion about gays at all. It's just a comment I made about the president of the university."

== Personal life ==
Brennaman has three children. His son, Thom, and daughter, Dawn, are children from his first marriage. He also has a daughter, Ashley, from his second marriage. He has seven grandchildren. He is married to Amanda Ingram. Thom, also a broadcaster, worked with the Reds, the Chicago Cubs, Arizona Diamondbacks, and was the number two baseball play-by-play man (behind Joe Buck) on Fox Sports' Major League Baseball broadcasts. Thom now works for the ACC, calling college football and basketball.

On October 4, 2006, the Cincinnati Reds re-hired Thom to join his father in the radio booth as well as do play-by-play on television starting with the 2007 season.

== Bibliography ==
- Marty Brennaman Ford C. Frick Award biography at the National Baseball Hall of Fame
- Marty Brennaman at the National Radio Hall of Fame

Preceded by Al Michaels	Cincinnati Reds Play-by-play Announcer; 1974–2019	Succeeded by Tommy Thrall
