= FanDuel Sports Network Ohio =

American regional sports network

- Type: Regional sports network
- Country: United States
- Broadcast area: Ohio; Indiana; Kentucky; Northwest Pennsylvania; West Virginia; Southwest New York; Nationwide (via satellite)
- Network: FanDuel Sports Network
- Headquarters: Cleveland, Ohio

Programming
- Language: English
- Picture format: 720p (HDTV); 480i (SDTV)

Ownership
- Owner: Main Street Sports Group

History
- Launched: February 9, 1989
- Closed: September 30, 2026
- Former names: SportsChannel Ohio (1989–1998); Fox Sports Ohio (1998–1999, 2008–2021); Fox Sports Net Ohio (1999–2004); FSN Ohio (2004–2008); Bally Sports Ohio (2021–2024)

Links
- Website: www.fanduelsportsnetwork.com

FanDuel Sports Network Ohio (formerly Bally Sports Ohio) was an American regional sports network owned by Main Street Sports Group (formerly Diamond Sports Group) as part of the FanDuel Sports Network chain.

The channel broadcast regional coverage of sports events in the state of Ohio, with a focus on professional sports teams based in Cleveland, Cincinnati, and Columbus.

FanDuel Sports Network Ohio was available on cable providers (plus U-Verse and DirecTV) throughout Ohio, as well as parts of Indiana, Kentucky, northwestern Pennsylvania, eastern Tennessee, border communities of West Virginia, and extreme southwestern New York; it was also available nationwide on satellite via DirecTV.

== History ==
Former logo

The channel originally launched on February 9, 1989, as SportsChannel Ohio. It launched as an affiliate of SportsChannel, a slate of regional sports networks operated as a joint venture between Cablevision and NBC (the owner of WKYC until 1990). SportsChannel Ohio initially held the broadcast games from the Cleveland Cavaliers and the Cleveland Indians. The channel also aired select Cincinnati Reds games produced by SportsChannel Cincinnati, Notre Dame Fighting Irish basketball and football games, and Ohio State Buckeyes sporting events (with the exception of football and basketball).

In 1997, News Corporation and Liberty Media purchased a 40% interest in Cablevision's sports properties including the SportsChannel America networks (as well as Madison Square Garden and its NBA and NHL team tenants, the New York Knicks and New York Rangers) in a deal worth $850 million, forming the venture National Sports Partners to run the owned-and-operated regional networks. As part of a gradual rebranding of the SportsChannel networks that began that month, SportsChannel Ohio was rebranded as Fox Sports Ohio in January 1998.

The channel was then rebranded as Fox Sports Net Ohio in 2000, as part of a collective brand modification of the FSN networks under the "Fox Sports Net" banner; subsequently in 2004, the channel shortened its name to FSN Ohio, through the networks' de-emphasis of the brand.

In February 2005, News Corporation (which spun off most of its entertainment properties into 21st Century Fox in July 2013) acquired Cablevision's ownership stakes in Fox Sports Ohio and Fox Sports Florida, following an asset trade in which Fox sold its interest in Madison Square Garden, the Knicks and the Rangers, to Cablevision, in exchange for acquiring sole ownership of the two networks. The channel reverted to the Fox Sports Ohio moniker in 2008

On December 14, 2017, as part of a merger between both companies, The Walt Disney Company announced plans to acquire all 22 regional Fox Sports networks from 21st Century Fox, including Fox Sports Ohio, sister network SportsTime Ohio, and Fox's 50% stake in the network's Cincinnati sub-feed. However, on June 27, 2018, the Justice Department ordered their divestment under antitrust grounds, citing Disney's ownership of ESPN. On May 3, 2019, it was announced that Diamond Sports Group (a partnership between Sinclair Broadcast Group and Allen Media Group) would acquire the channels as part of an agreement with Disney.

The sale was completed on August 23, 2019. The network continued to operate under the Fox Sports name until March 31, 2021, when it was rebranded Bally Sports Ohio as part of a sponsorship deal between Diamond and casino operator Bally's Corporation.

2010s logo as Fox Sports Ohio

Bally Sports Ohio logo

On March 14, 2023, Diamond Sports filed for chapter 11 bankruptcy protection. On October 21, 2024, the channel was rebranded as FanDuel Sports Network Ohio as part of a new agreement between Diamond and FanDuel Group.

In December 2025, Main Street Sports Group began to miss rights fee payments to sports teams featured on their networks; the company was attempting to sell itself to British sports streaming company DAZN and would prepare to cease operations if it could not complete the transaction before the end of January 2026. Puck News reported that as a result of the failed rights payments and cancelled sale to DAZN, Main Street Sports Group intended to wind down operations in spring 2026 following the conclusion of the 2025–26 NHL and NBA seasons. The Cincinnati Reds were one of the nine MLB teams that terminated their contract with Main Street in January 2026; on February 2, the Cincinnati Reds announced that MLB Local Media would assume production and distribution of their local telecasts beginning with their 2026 season.

Altafiber stopped carrying FanDuel Sports Network Ohio's Cincinnati subfeed on April 30, having already created a channel for MLB Local Media's Cincinnati Reds games.

== Feeds ==
The network operated regional feeds for the Cleveland and Cincinnati markets, both branded as FanDuel Sports Network Ohio (but with the latter feed disambiguated in some electronic program guides and online television listings services as FanDuel Sports Network Cincinnati), which broadcast different events depending on the market. This arrangement occasionally caused event conflicts in the Columbus market, which is located between Cincinnati and Cleveland. In the event of conflicting events between the two regional feeds (typically between the Columbus Blue Jackets and Cleveland Cavaliers, the Blue Jackets and Cleveland Cavaliers, TV providers in Central Ohio usually carried the other game on an alternate channel.

== Programming ==
FanDuel Sports Network Ohio held the exclusive regional pay television rights to the MLB's Cincinnati Reds (1989-2025), NBA's Cleveland Cavaliers (1990-26), and the NHL's Columbus Blue Jackets (2000-26). The channel also carried a select number of college basketball games involving the University of Dayton and Northern Kentucky University. The network formerly held the local rights to college basketball games featuring Xavier University and the University of Cincinnati through the 2019–20 season.

The channel formerly broadcast Cleveland Indians games from the network's launch as SportsChannel Ohio, until Fox Sports Ohio lost the rights as a result of the team starting eventual sister network SportsTime Ohio in March 2006. Despite this move, Reds games continued to be blacked out in most of Northeast Ohio, the designated market area of the now-Guardians. When Reds games aired in the rest of Ohio, the Cleveland feed aired generic national Fox Sports Networks programming unless a local Cleveland event was scheduled. Although they came under common ownership following Fox's purchase of the latter in 2012, Bally Sports Ohio did not share broadcast rights to any sporting events with Bally Sports Great Lakes and vice versa (unlike arrangements that exist between Fox Sports South and Fox Sports Southeast, and Fox Sports Florida and Fox Sports Sun), with both networks maintaining their own respective team television contracts. From 2019 to 2021, Columbus Crew games were split between Fox Sports Ohio and SportsTime Ohio, although those telecasts were blacked out in the Cincinnati area due to the presence of FC Cincinnati.

On October 19, 2016, Fox Sports and the Reds announced an extension of their broadcast agreement to the end of the 2032 season. The deal included the Reds taking an equity stake in the Cincinnati sub-feed of Fox Sports Ohio. In November 2024, amid the Diamond Sports bankruptcy, the Reds agreed to exit the contract and would sign with MLB Local Media for the 2025 season. On January 13, 2025, the team announced that it had instead renewed with Main Street Sports Group, and would remain on FDSN Ohio for the 2025 season. On February 2, 2026, the Reds terminated their broadcast agreement with Main Street Sports Group, and announced that MLB Local Media would produce and distribute Reds games starting in the upcoming 2026 MLB season.

FanDuel Sports Network Ohio was also the broadcaster for the AHL's Cleveland Monsters until 2024 when the Monsters signed a new deal with Gray Television.

== Notable on-air staff ==
=== Former staff ===
==== Cincinnati Reds ====
- John Sadak - play-by-play
- Chris Welsh – primary color commentary/fill in co-host Reds Live
- Jeff Brantley – color commentary (select games)
- Barry Larkin – color commentary (home games)
- Jim Day – sideline reporter/Alternative play by play
- Brian Giesenschlag – co-host Reds Live
- Sam LeCure – co-host Reds Live/Cincinnati Reds color commentary (select games)
- Annie Sabo – Fill in co-host Reds Live

==== Cleveland Cavaliers ====
- John Michael – play-by-play
- Austin Carr – color commentator
- Brad Daugherty – color commentator
- Serena Winters – sideline reporter
- Cayleigh Griffin – pregame/halftime/postgame host
- Daniel Gibson – pregame/halftime/postgame host

==== Columbus Blue Jackets ====
- Steve Mears – play-by-play
- Jody Shelley – color commentary
- Dave Maetzold - in-game/locker room reporter
- Jean-Luc Grand-Pierre - pregame/intermission/postgame (Blue Jackets Live) co-host
- Brian Giesenschlag – pregame/intermission/postgame (Blue Jackets Live) co-host

==== College sports ====
- John Cooper – analyst for Game Time with Ryan Day
- Jim Lachey – analyst for Game Time with Ryan Day
- Chris "Beanie" Wells – analyst for Game Time with Ryan Day

==== Columbus Crew ====
- Neil Sika – play-by-play
- Jordan Angeli – color commentary
- Brett Hiltbrand – sideline reporter/pregame/halftime/postgame host (Crew Live)
