= Jim Day (host) =

American television sports broadcaster

- Born: Jim Day; December 30, 1965 (age 60); Westerville, Ohio
- Sports commentary career
- Team: Cincinnati Reds
- Sport: Baseball

James Day (born December 30, 1965) is an American television sports broadcaster currently affiliated with FanDuel Sports Network Ohio and the Cincinnati Reds of Major League Baseball. Apart from Reds' broadcasts, he is known for Jim's Day Off, an advertising campaign in which he explores the "must see" attractions in Cincinnati and Northern Kentucky.

== Early life ==
Day is a native of Columbus, Ohio, and graduated from Otterbein University.

== Broadcasting career ==
Jim Day began his professional career in 1988. During this time, he managed to work his way on-air for a network affiliate in a Top 35 market, while still in college. Day spent seven years working in many roles at WSYX-TV. After spending two years away from television while traveling the country with the American Basketball League, he returned to television.

Day spent five years in Tampa, Florida working for the ABC-affiliate WFTS-TV as the understudy of Ted Koppel. He later went to Ohio to work for Fox Sports Ohio.

=== Fox Sports Ohio ===
Jim returned to Ohio in 2000 and has been with Fox Sports Ohio ever since. He currently hosts "Reds Live," the pre-game and post-game shows of the Cincinnati Reds. During the 2011 season, Day filled in as play-by-play announcer for the first time. He also filled in as play-by-play announcer in 2013, and has done so from 2016–2021. Day has also worked for the News Department of Fox Sports and has covered every major sport for the Network. Recently he served as lead host for "FSN Live at the BCS Championship". Day hosted Musketeers Live 2010-2011 for Fox Sports Ohio broadcasts of Xavier Musketeers men's basketball. Prior to that he was the host of Blue Jackets live for Columbus Blue Jackets broadcasts on Fox Sports Ohio. Fox Sports Ohio announced for 2014, Day will work all 145 games as sideline reporter and provide reports for pre- and post-game coverage.
