= 1988 Los Angeles Dodgers season =

Major League Baseball season

1988 Los Angeles Dodgers
- World Series champions National League champions National League West champions
- League: National League
- Division: West
- Ballpark: Dodger Stadium
- City: Los Angeles
- Record: 94–67 (.584)
- Divisional place: 1st
- Owners: Peter O'Malley
- General managers: Fred Claire
- Managers: Tommy Lasorda
- Television: KTTV–TV 11 (Vin Scully, Ross Porter, Don Drysdale); Z Channel (Rick Monday, Tony Hernandez)
- Radio: KABC–AM 790 (Vin Scully, Ross Porter, Don Drysdale); KWKW–AM 1330 (Jaime Jarrín, René Cárdenas)

The 1988 Los Angeles Dodgers season was the 99th season for the Los Angeles Dodgers franchise in Major League Baseball (MLB), their 31st season in Los Angeles, California, and their 27th season playing their home games at Dodger Stadium. The Dodgers as a squad that was picked to finish fourth would win the World Series, upsetting the heavily favored New York Mets and Oakland Athletics along the way. Kirk Gibson carried the Dodger offense, winning the National League Most Valuable Player Award. Orel Hershiser dominated on the mound, throwing a record 59 consecutive scoreless innings on his way to winning the Cy Young Award.

== Offseason ==
- December 11, 1987: Acquired Alfredo Griffin, Jay Howell and Jesse Orosco in a three-team deal with the Oakland Athletics and New York Mets for Bob Welch, Jack Savage and Matt Young
- January 29, 1988: Kirk Gibson was signed as a free agent.
- April 1, 1988: Acquired John Gibbons from the New York Mets for Craig Shipley

With the sub-par 1987 performance fresh in their minds, General Manager Fred Claire and Field Manager Tom Lasorda knew what needed to be fixed. They started the off-season by allowing poor performers such as Glenn Hoffman, Ken Landreaux and Phil Garner explore the free agent market. On December 11, 1987, Claire pulled the trigger on a trade that helped solidify the Dodgers' defense and bullpen, despite giving up one of the top pitchers of the National League in 1987 in Bob Welch. The Dodgers acquired shortstop Alfredo Griffin and relief pitchers Jay Howell and Jesse Orosco in a three-team trade ironically with the Athletics and Mets, the two teams they would eventually defeat in the '88 postseason. In an attempt to boost the offense for the upcoming season, the Dodgers signed Mike Davis on December 15, 1987. The biggest move of the off-season was still to come.

On January 29, 1988, the Dodgers signed free agent slugger Kirk Gibson from the Detroit Tigers. Gibson, who was a 9-year veteran at the time of the signing, was known for his power at the plate and speed on the basepaths, but was also brought in to be a clubhouse leader. To help solidify their roster the Dodgers went on to sign 21-year veteran pitcher Don Sutton and 20-year veteran catcher Rick Dempsey. Dempsey, known for his fiery personality, joined Gibson as the veteran clubhouse leaders.

It was Gibson, however, who would make the biggest impact. Preparing for his first spring training game as a Dodger on March 3, 1988, Gibson began his pregame warm-ups in the outfield. Taking off his hat to wipe sweat from his head, Gibson noticed people laughing. He soon realized that someone (it turned out to be reliever Jesse Orosco) had greased the inside of his cap with eyeblack and he had unknowingly wiped it all over himself in full view of the fans who were in attendance. Gibson immediately left the field in anger and left the Dodgers' spring training complex, missing the game. The next day, manager Tommy Lasorda held a team meeting where Orosco apologized. The message was made clear, however: Gibson came to the Dodgers to win and was serious about it.

Key players from the 1987 team were also brought back. These players included right fielder Mike Marshall, center fielder John Shelby, catcher Mike Scioscia, Second Baseman Steve Sax, Utilityman Mickey Hatcher, and pitchers Orel Hershiser, Fernando Valenzuela, and Tim Leary.

== Regular season ==
=== Season standings ===
NL West
Team	W	L	Pct.	GB	Home	Road
Los Angeles Dodgers	94	67	.584	—	45‍–‍36	49‍–‍31
Cincinnati Reds	87	74	.540	7	45‍–‍35	42‍–‍39
San Diego Padres	83	78	.516	11	47‍–‍34	36‍–‍44
San Francisco Giants	83	79	.512	11½	45‍–‍36	38‍–‍43
Houston Astros	82	80	.506	12½	44‍–‍37	38‍–‍43
Atlanta Braves	54	106	.338	39½	28‍–‍51	26‍–‍55

=== Record vs. opponents ===
1988 National League record Sources:
Team	ATL	CHC	CIN	HOU	LAD	MON	NYM	PHI	PIT	SD	SF	STL
Atlanta	—	5–7	5–13	5–13	4–14	4–8	4–8	6–6	5–5	8–10	5–13	3–9
Chicago	7–5	—	6–6	7–5	4–8–1	9–9	9–9	8–10	7–11	8–4	5–7	7–11
Cincinnati	13–5	6–6	—	9–9	7–11	5–7	4–7	9–3	7–5	10–8	11–7	6–6
Houston	13–5	5–7	9–9	—	9–9	6–6	5–7	8–4	8–4	6–12	7–11	6–6
Los Angeles	14–4	8–4–1	11–7	9–9	—	8–4	1–10	11–1	6–6	7–11	12–6	7–5
Montreal	8–4	9–9	7–5	6–6	4–8	—	6–12	9–9–1	8–10	4–8	7–5	13–5
New York	8–4	9–9	7–4	7–5	10–1	12–6	—	10–8	12–6	7–5	4–8	14–4
Philadelphia	6-6	10–8	3–9	4–8	1–11	9–9–1	8–10	—	7–11	4–7	7–5	6–12
Pittsburgh	5–5	11–7	5–7	4–8	6–6	10–8	6–12	11–7	—	8–4	8–4	11–7
San Diego	10–8	4–8	8–10	12–6	11–7	8–4	5–7	7–4	4–8	—	8–10	6–6
San Francisco	13–5	7–5	7–11	11–7	6–12	5–7	8–4	5–7	4–8	10–8	—	7–5
St. Louis	9–3	11–7	6–6	6–6	5–7	5–13	4–14	12–6	7–11	6–6	5–7	—

=== Opening Day lineup ===
Opening Day starters
#	Name	Position
3	Steve Sax	2B
7	Alfredo Griffin	SS
23	Kirk Gibson	LF
28	Pedro Guerrero	3B
5	Mike Marshall	1B
31	John Shelby	CF
37	Mike Davis	RF
14	Mike Scioscia	C
34	Fernando Valenzuela	P

=== Roster ===
1988 Los Angeles Dodgers
Roster
Pitchers: 49 Tim Belcher; 46 William Brennan; 52 Tim Crews; 41 Brad Havens; 55 Orel Hershiser; 57 Shawn Hillegas; 51 Brian Holton; 29 Ricky Horton; 50 Jay Howell; 43 Ken Howell; 41 Bill Krueger; 54 Tim Leary; 48 Ramón Martínez; 47 Jesse Orosco; 26 Alejandro Peña; 20 Don Sutton; 30 John Tudor; 34 Fernando Valenzuela	Catchers: 17 Rick Dempsey; 15 Gilberto Reyes; 14 Mike Scioscia; Infielders: 10 Dave Anderson; 7 Alfredo Griffin; 28 Pedro Guerrero; 33 Jeff Hamilton; 3 Steve Sax; 27 Mike Sharperson; 22 Franklin Stubbs; 21 Tracy Woodson	Outfielders: 37 Mike Davis; 40 Mike Devereaux; 23 Kirk Gibson; 38 José González; 45 Chris Gwynn; 9 Mickey Hatcher; 12 Danny Heep; 5 Mike Marshall; 31 John Shelby	Manager: 2 Tommy Lasorda; Coaches: 8 Joey Amalfitano (third base); 58 Mark Cresse (bullpen); 13 Joe Ferguson (first base); 35 Ben Hines (hitting); 11 Manny Mota; 16 Ron Perranoski (pitching); 18 Bill Russell (bench)

=== Notable transactions ===
- June 6, 1988: Raúl Mondesí was signed as an amateur free agent by the Dodgers.
- June 27, 1988: Mario Soto was signed as a free agent by the Dodgers.
- August 10, 1988: Don Sutton was released by the Dodgers.
- August 16, 1988: Acquired John Tudor from the St. Louis Cardinals for Pedro Guerrero
- August 30, 1988: Shawn Hillegas was traded by the Dodgers to the Chicago White Sox for Ricky Horton.
- October 3, 1988: Acquired Jim Neidlinger from the Pittsburgh Pirates for Bill Krueger

== Season summary ==
=== April ===
The Dodgers started the 1988 season at home against the San Francisco Giants. The Dodgers opening day pitcher was Valenzuela. The opening day lineup featured Sax, Griffin, Gibson, Marshall, Shelby, Davis, Scioscia and third baseman Pedro Guerrero. The first pitch of the season, to Sax by Giants pitcher Dave Dravecky, was hit into the left field seats at Dodger Stadium. However, Valenzuela would then give up the lead and the Dodgers would eventually lose the game 5–1. The team would go on to win their next five games and finish April with a 13–7 record which included a four-game sweep of the Atlanta Braves. Hershiser finished the month of April with a 5–0 record.

=== May ===
The Dodgers went 14-13 during the month of May. As it had always been, May was one of the toughest months for the Dodgers. On May 21, 1988, Griffin was hit by a pitch from Mets pitcher Dwight Gooden on the hand. Griffin would miss over two months with a broken hand. This heated up the Dodger-Met rivalry which would last the remainder of the season. In fact, the next day, May 22, 1988, Mets starting pitcher David Cone hit Pedro Guerrero in the head in the 6th inning. As a show of disgust at what the Dodgers felt was headhunting by the Mets pitchers, Guerrero proceeded to stand up, throw his bat in Cone's direction and charge the mound. A benches clearing mêlée ensued and Guerrero and Lasorda were ejected from the game. Because Griffin had to be placed on the disabled list with a broken hand the Dodgers were left with a hole at shortstop, though they had a solid replacement in the form of veteran Dave Anderson. At times during May, the lead over the Astros neared five games. By the end of the month the Dodgers' lead in the NL West Division was only a half of a game over the Houston Astros.

=== June ===
The Dodgers had a solid month of June compiling a record of 17–9 over the month. Hershiser continued his successful year by finishing the month of June with a record of 12–3. Much of the Dodgers' success to this point in the season could be attributed to solid starting pitching from Hershiser, Leary and the emerging rookie Tim Belcher. However, the best pitchers of the Dodgers' pitching staff were those who came out of the bullpen. Orosco, Howell, Brian Holton and Alejandro Peña were all enjoying successful seasons. After a slow start in April, Gibson was now hitting .288 with 15 HR's, 40 RBI, 53 runs scored and 15 SB's.

=== August ===
The summer success continued for the Dodgers as they completed August with a 17–12 record. Don Sutton was released August 10 after GM Fred Claire discovered Sutton had informally discussed a possible front office job with the Houston Astros. Sutton was 3–6 with a 3.92 ERA at the time. Sutton did not sign with another team. His 233 career wins with the Dodgers remains the team record.

=== Dramatic summer moments ===
Many who have followed the Dodgers have pointed to a few moments during the months of July and August that got the season going in the right direction, keep the successes going and exemplified what the 1988 Dodgers were all about.

- July 6, 1988: Down 3–0 in the bottom of the 8th inning against the St. Louis Cardinals, the Dodgers scored three runs then Anderson, Mike Sharperson and Sax loaded the bases. The Cardinals would bring in closer Todd Worrell in an attempt to snuff out the rally. However, first baseman Franklin Stubbs would drive a Worrell offering into the right field seats for a game winning grand slam.
- August 13, 1988: The Dodgers and Giants take the Dodger Stadium fans to the 11th inning with a tie. Guerrero starts the Dodgers side of the 11th inning with a fly ball to right that Giants outfielder Candy Maldonado loses in the lights. A passed ball allows Guerrero to go to second. However, Guerrero and Lasorda are then ejected from the game arguing that the Giants' pitcher had balked. Because of this, Stubbs had to pinch run for Guerrero leaving the Dodgers with no additional pinch hitters on their bench. When pitcher Alejandro Peña's batting spot comes around in the lineup they are forced to pinch hit for him with another pitcher, Tim Leary. Amazingly, Leary singled back up the middle and Stubbs scored giving the Dodgers the extra inning walk off win.
- A week after Leary's dramatic game-winning hit, the Dodgers had another walk off win. The Dodgers entered the bottom of the 9th inning at Dodger Stadium trailing the Montreal Expos 3–2. The Expos brought in Joe Hesketh to close out the game. After getting Sax out, Hesketh allowed Mickey Hatcher to double. Anderson ran for Hatcher and Kirk Gibson singled home Anderson. One out later with John Shelby at the plate, Gibson stole second base. With Shelby still at the plate, Hesketh threw a wild pitch through catcher Nelson Santovenia. Gibson advanced to third but did not stop there; the former linebacker kept going, charging toward the plate that was being covered by pitcher Hesketh. Santovenia threw back to Hesketh but Gibson beat the throw to the plate giving the Dodgers the win. Gibson later revealed that part of his reasoning for attempting to take home was that he knew Hesketh had suffered a broken leg earlier in his career and Gibson felt he would not be willing to risk a collision by stepping into the basepath to block off the plate.

=== September/October ===
Hershiser would begin a scoreless inning streak in September that he would eventually take to over 59 innings and pass Dodger legend Don Drysdale for the record for most consecutive scoreless innings. Hershiser would throw complete game shutouts against the Braves on September 5, the Reds on September 10, the Braves again on September 14, the Astros on September 19 and the Giants on September 23 to take him within 9 innings of Drysdale's record. Before Hershiser would get a chance to break the record the Dodgers needed to clinch the National League West championship. Their chance came in San Diego on September 26. The San Diego Padres would take a 2–0 lead in the first inning, but the Dodgers would score 3 runs and win the game 3–2, clinching the division. Hershiser would get his next start on September 28 and he would pitch 10 scoreless innings against the Padres to break Drysdale's record.

== Game log ==
=== Regular season ===
Legend
	Dodgers win
	Dodgers loss
	Postponement
	Clinched division
**Bold**	Dodgers team member

1988 regular season game log: 94–67–1 (Home: 45–36; Away: 49–31–1)
April: 13–7 (Home: 6–5; Away: 7–2)

#	Date	Time (PT)	Opponent	Score	Win	Loss	Save	Time of Game	Attendance	Record	Box Streak
1	April 4	1:13 p.m. PDT	Giants	L 1–5	Dravecky (1–0)	**Valenzuela** (0–1)	—	2:24	48,484	0–1	L1
2	April 5	7:05 p.m. PDT	Giants	**W** 5–0	**Hershiser** (1–0)	Downs (0–1)	—	2:29	37,472	1–1	W1
3	April 7	4:41 p.m. PDT	@ Braves	**W** 5–2	**Peña** (1–0)	Assenmaacher (0–1)	**Orosco** (1)	3:11	5,257	2–1	W2
4	April 8	4:41 p.m. PDT	@ Braves	**W** 6–3	**Leary** (1–0)	Coffman (0–1)	**Belcher** (1)	2:27	10,723	3–1	W3
5	April 9	4:41 p.m. PDT	@ Braves	**W** 11–3	**Valenzuela** (1–1)	Glavine (0–1)	—	2:37	16,603	4–1	W4
6	April 10	11:07 a.m. PDT	@ Braves	**W** 3–1	**Hershiser** (2–0)	Mahler (0–1)	**Orosco** (2)	2:24	14,171	5–1	W5
7	April 12	7:25 p.m. PDT	@ Padres	L 3–5	Hawkins (1–1)	**Sutton** (0–1)	Davis (1)	3:02	52,395	5–2	L1
8	April 13	7:05 p.m. PDT	@ Padres	**W** 4–3	**Howell** (1–0)	Show (0–2)	**Orosco** (3)	2:51	16,838	6–2	W1
9	April 14	1:05 p.m. PDT	@ Padres	L 0–2	Jones (1–1)	**Valenzuela** (1–2)	McCullers (2)	2:45	24,096	6–3	L1
10	April 15	7:08 pm PDT	Braves	**W** 3–2	**Hershiser** (3–0)	Glavine (0–2)	—	2:27	41,22	7–3	W1
11	April 16	1:05 pm PDT	Braves	**W** 7–4	**Belcher** (1–0)	Mahler (0–2)	**Peña** (2)	2:40	27,114	8–3	W2
12	April 17	1:05 pm PDT	Braves	L 1–3	Smith (1–2)	**Sutton** (0–2)	—	2:21	46,484	8–4	L1
13	April 18	7:08 p.m. PDT	Padres	**W** 6–0	**Leary** (2–0)	Show (0–3)	—	3:00	24,357	9–4	W1
—	April 19		Padres	**Postponed (Rain)** (Makeup date: June 17)							
—	April 20		Padres	**Postponed (Rain)** (Makeup date: June 19)							
—	April 21		Padres	**Postponed (Rain)** (Makeup date: September 21)							
—	April 22	7:35 p.m. PDT	@ Giants	Postponed (rain); Makeup: July 26							
14	April 23	12:25 p.m. PDT	@ Giants	**W** 10–3	**Hershiser** (4–0)	Krukow (1–1)	—	2:57	33,271	10–4	W2
15	April 24	1:05 p.m. PDT	@ Giants	**W** 4–0	**Valenzuela** (2–2)	LaCoss (1–2)	**Howell** (1)	2:50	39,092	11–4	W3
16	April 26	7:07 p.m. PDT	Cubs	L 3–7	Maddux (4–1)	**Leary** (2–1)	—	2:39	34,279	11–5	L1
17	April 27	7:07 p.m. PDT	Cubs	**W** 4–0	**Sutton** (1–2)	Moyer (1–2)	**Peña** (3)	2:42	29,462	12–5	W1
18	April 28	7:05 p.m. PDT	Cubs	L 1–5	Schiraldi (1–2)	**Belcher** (1–1)	DiPino (1)	3:05	29,509	12–6	L1
19	April 29	7:05 p.m. PDT	Cardinals	**W** 6–4	**Hershiser** (5–0)	Cox (2–3)	**Howell** (2)	2:40	44,301	13–6	W1
20	April 30	7:05 p.m. PDT	Cardinals	L 2–5	O'Neal (2–1)	**Valenzuela** (2–3)	McWilliams (1)	2:42	47,425	13–7	L1

May: 14–13 (Home: 6–7; Away: 8–6)

#	Date	Time (PT)	Opponent	Score	Win	Loss	Save	Time of Game	Attendance	Record	Box Streak
21	May 1	1:05 p.m. PDT	Cardinals	L 0–9	Tudor (1–0)	**Leary** (2–2)	Terry (1)	2:47	46,176	13–8	L2
22	May 2	7:08 p.m. PDT	Pirates	**W** 6–3	**Orosco** (1–0)	Drabek (3–2)	—	3:16	26,821	14–8	W1
23	May 3	7:05 p.m. PDT	Pirates	**W** 14–6	**Belcher** (2–1)	Dunne (1–1)	—	3:03	26,943	15–8	W2
24	May 4	7:05 p.m. PDT	Pirates	**W** 8–5	**Hershiser** (6–0)	Palacios (0–2)	—	3:12	30,423	16–8	W3
25	May 6	5:35 p.m. PDT	@ Cardinals	**W** 10–2	**Valenzuela** (3–3)	O'Neal (2–2)	—	2:25	49,194	17–8	W4
26	May 7	5:05 p.m. PDT	@ Cardinals	L 1–2	Worrell (1–2)	**Orosco** (1–1)	—	2:28	46,159	17–9	L1
27	May 8	11:15 a.m. PDT	@ Cardinals	**W** 12–6	**Sutton** (2–2)	DeLeón (2–3)	—	2:46	40,098	18–9	W1
—	May 9	11:20 a.m. PDT	@ Cubs	Postponed (rain); Makeup: July 14							
28	May 10	11:20 a.m. PDT	@ Cubs	**W** 6–5 (14)	**Holton** (1–0)	Lancaster (1–3)	**Hershiser** (1)	4:27	12,985	19–9	W2
29	May 11	4:05 p.m. PDT	@ Pirates	L 1–2 (11)	Medvin (1–0)	**Peña** (1–1)	—	3:46	26,367	19–10	L1
30	May 12	4:05 p.m. PDT	@ Pirates	L 4–7	Smiley (3–2)	**Hershiser** (6–1)	—	2:29	11,072	19–11	L2
31	May 13	7:05 p.m. PDT	Phillies	L 1–2	Gross (3–1)	**Leary** (2–3)	Tekulve (2)	2:56	38,015	19–12	L3
32	May 14	7:05 p.m. PDT	Phillies	**W** 3–2	**Sutton** (3–2)	Ruffin (3–3)	**Howell** (3)	2:58	47,379	20–12	W1
33	May 15	1:05 p.m. PDT	Phillies	**W** 9–2	**Belcher** (3–1)	Palmer (0–3)	—	3:07	41,045	21–12	W2
34	May 17	7:10 p.m. PDT	Expos	L 5–6	Heaton (1–2)	**Valenzuela** (3–4)	Burke (5)	2:50	34,309	21–13	L1
35	May 18	7:05 p.m. PDT	Expos	L 0–3	Dopson (1–1)	**Hershiser** (6–2)	Burke (6)	2:55	27,775	21–14	L2
36	May 19	7:05 p.m. PDT	Expos	**W** 2–0	**Leary** (3–3)	Martínez (3–6)	—	2:36	25,283	22–14	W1
37	May 20	7:05 p.m. PDT	Mets	L 2–5	Fernandez (2–3)	**Sutton** (3–3)	Myers (6)	3:28	44,867	22–15	L1
38	May 21	7:05 p.m. PDT	Mets	L 0–4	Gooden (8–0)	**Belcher** (3–12)	—	2:48	47,017	22–16	L2
39	May 22	1:08 p.m. PDT	Mets	L 2–5	Cone (6–0)	**Valenzuela** (3–5)	McDowell (5)	3:16	44,826	22–17	L3
40	May 24	2:55 p.m. PDT	@ Phillies	**W** 2–1 (12)	**Peña** (2–1)	Harris (0–1)	**Orosco** (4)	3:46	17,759	23–17	W1
41	May 25	4:35 p.m. PDT	@ Phillies	**W** 4–0	**Leary** (4–3)	Palmer (0–4)	—	2:28	24,444	24–17	W2
42	May 26	4:37 p.m. PDT	@ Phillies	**W** 10–8	**Howell** (2–0)	Bedrosian (0–1)	—	3:14	19,361	25–17	W3
43	May 27	4:35 p.m. PDT	@ Expos	**W** 5–2	**Orosco** (2–1)	McClure (1–2)	**Peña** (3)	3:16	18,113	26–17	W4
44	May 28	10:35 a.m. PDT	@ Expos	L 2–3 (10)	Parrett (4–1)	**Howell** (2–1)	—	2:58	15,320	26–18	L1
45	May 29	10:35 a.m. PDT	@ Expos	**W** 2–1	**Hershiser** (7–2)	Dopson (1–2)	—	2:24	35,311	27–18	W1
46	May 30	5:05 p.m. PDT	@ Mets	L 2–3	Darling (6–3)	**Leary** (4–4)	Myers (8)	2:50	42,096	27–19	L1
47	May 31	4:40 p.m. PDT	@ Mets	L 4–5 (11)	Myers (3–0)	**Peña** (2–2)	—	3:34	35,564	27–20	L2

June: 17–11 (Home: 9–6; Away: 8–5)

#	Date	Time (PT)	Opponent	Score	Win	Loss	Save	Time of Game	Attendance	Record	Box Streak
48	June 1	5:02 p.m. PDT	@ Mets	**W** 4–3	**Holton** (2–0)	Fernandez (2–5)	**Howell** (4)	3:29	29,659	28–20	W1
49	June 3	7:35 p.m. PDT	Reds	**W** 13–5	**Crews** (1–0)	Rasmussen (2–6)	—	3:28	45,242	29–20	W2
50	June 4	12:28 p.m. PDT	Reds	L 2–5	Rijo (6–1)	**Hershiser** (7–3)	—	3:10	32,550	29–21	L1
51	June 5	1:06 p.m. PDT	Reds	**W** 5–4	**Leary** (5–4)	Soto (3–5)	**Howell** (5)	2:47	38,982	30–21	W1
52	June 6	5:13 p.m. PDT	Astros	L 4–10	Knepper (7–1)	**Peña** (2–3)	Andersen (2)	3:32	19,327	30–22	L1
53	June 7	7:35 p.m. PDT	Astros	L 2–5	Darwin (3–4)	**Belcher** (3–3)	—	3:01	25,509	30–23	L2
54	June 8	7:40 p.m. PDT	Astros	**W** 11–1	**Valenzuela** (4–5)	Scott (6–2)	—	2:23	33,737	31–23	W1
55	June 9	1:05 p.m. PDT	Astros	**W** 4–2	**Hershiser** (8–3)	Ryan (5–4)	**Howell** (6)	2:53	25,959	32–23	W2
56	June 10	7:05 p.m. PDT	@ Padres	L 3–4	McCullers (1–4)	**Howell** (2–2)	–	2:46	19,859	32–24	L1
57	June 11	7:05 p.m. PDT	@ Padres	L 1–2	Rasmussen (3–6)	**Sutton** (3–4)	–	2:07	26,068	32–25	L2
58	June 12	1:05 p.m. PDT	@ Padres	L 2–5	Whitson (6–5)	**Belcher** (3–4)	Davis (9)	2:14	21,533	32–26	L3
59	June 14	4:40 p.m. PDT	@ Braves	**W** 5–4	**Valenzuela** (5–5)	Smith (1–7)	**Howell** (7)	2:46	11,136	33–26	W1
60	June 15	4:40 p.m. PDT	@ Braves	**W** 7–5	**Hershiser** (9–3)	Glavine (3–7)	**Peña** (4)	2:50	10,154	34–26	W2
61	June 16	2:40 p.m. PDT	@ Braves	L 2–9	Smith (3–3)	**K. Howell** (0–1)	—	2:27	9,666	34–27	L1
62 (1)	June 17	4:08 p.m. PDT	Padres	L 4–7	Whitson (7–5)	**Leary** (5–5)	Davis (11)	2:36	—	34–28	L2
63 (2)	June 17	7:20 p.m. PDT	Padres	L 3–4	Rasmussen (4–6)	**Holton** (2–1)	McCullers (6)	3:07	33,649	34–29	L3
64	June 18	1:09 p.m. PDT	Padres	**W** 3–0	**Belcher** (4–4)	Show (5–7)	**Howell** (8)	2:44	37,743	35–29	W1
65 (1)	June 19	1:06 p.m. PDT	Padres	**W** 12–2	**Hershiser** (10–3)	Jones (5–6)	—	2:17	—	36–29	W2
66 (2)	June 19	3:59 p.m. PDT	Padres	**W** 5–4 (1)	**Crews** (2–0)	Davis (2–4)	—	3:28	37,045	37–29	W3
67	June 20	7:38 p.m. PDT	Braves	**W** 7–3	**Hillegas** (1–0)	Glavine (3–8)	**Peña** (5)	2:43	43,268	38–29	W4
68	June 21	7:35 p.m. PDT	Braves	**W** 2–1	**Leary** (6–5)	Smith (3–4)	—	2:09	18,485	39–29	W5
69	June 22	7:35 p.m. PDT	Braves	L 1–4	Mahler (8–6)	**Sutton** (3–5)	—	2:29	27,878	39–30	L1
70	June 24	4:35 p.m. PDT	@ Reds	**W** 5–3	**Hershiser** (11–3)	Robinson (3–6)	**Belcher** (2)	2:52	33,781	40–30	W1
71	June 25	4:06 p.m. PDT	@ Reds	**W** 6–4	**Holton** (3–1)	Rijo (8–3)	**Orosco** (5)	2:59	35,470	41–30	W2
72	June 26	11:15 a.m. PDT	@ Reds	**W** 9–6	**Belcher** (5–4)	Franco (1–5)	**Holton** (1)	3:05	29,520	42–30	W3
73	June 27	5:35 p.m. PDT	@ Astros	**W** 4–0	**Hillegas** (2–0)	Andújar (0–3)	**Peña** (6)	2:47	27,185	43–30	W4
74	June 28	5:35 p.m. PDT	@ Astros	L 3–4	Knepper (8–1)	**Holton** (3–2)	Agosto (1)	2:34	28,838	43–31	L1
75	June 29	11:35 a.m. PDT	@ Astros	**W** 2–0	**Hershiser** (12–3)	Ryan (5–6)	—	2:32	27,678	44–31	W1

July: 16–12–1 (Home: 5–7; Away: 11–5–1)

#	Date	Time (PT)	Opponent	Score	Win	Loss	Save	Time of Game	Attendance	Record	Box Streak
76	July 1	7:37 p.m. PDT	Cubs	L 2–9	Moyer (5–7)	**Valenzuela** (5–6)	—	3:09	42,763	44–32	L1
77	July 2	7:07 p.m. PDT	Cubs	**W** 8–1	**Leary** (7–5)	Pico (3–3)	—	2:55	44,166	45–32	W1
78	July 3	1:05 p.m. PDT	Cubs	L 1–2	Sufcliffe (7–5)	**Hillegas** (2–1)	Lancaster (4)	2:44	43,209	45–33	L1
79	July 4	5:10 p.m. PDT	Cardinals	**W** 5–3	**Peña** (3–3)	Tudor (4–3)	**Belcher** (3)	2:48	44,855	46–33	W1
80	July 5	7:35 p.m. PDT	Cardinals	**W** 6–3	**Hershiser** (13–3)	Cox (2–4)	**Belcher** (4)	2:24	32,495	47–33	W2
81	July 6	7:37 p.m. PDT	Cardinals	**W** 7–3	**Crews** (3–0)	Worrell (4–5)	—	2:45	37,210	48–33	W3
82	July 8	7:35 p.m. PDT	Pirates	L 3–4	Drabek (6–5)	**Leary** (7–6)	Gott (11)	3:15	40,690	48–34	L1
83	July 9	7:05 p.m. PDT	Pirates	L 2–8	Dunne (6–7)	**Hillegas** (2–2)	—	3:14	46,662	48–35	L2
84	July 10	1:08 p.m. PDT	Pirates	L 2–7	Walk (10–4)	**Hershiser** (13–4)	—	2:24	43,014	48–36	L3
—	July 12	5:30 p.m. PDT	59th All-Star Game	American League vs. National League (Riverfront Stadium, Cincinnati, Ohio)							
85 (1)	July 14	10:05 a.m. PDT	@ Cubs	**W** 1–0	**Leary** (8–6)	Sufcliffe (7–7)	**Peña** (7)	2:49	—	49–36	W1
86 (2)	July 14	1:59 p.m. PDT	@ Cubs	**W** 6–3	**Holton** (4–2)	Schiraldi (4–8)	**Howell** (9)	2:49	34,031	50–36	W2
87	July 15	1:05 p.m. PDT	@ Cubs	**W** 3–2 (10)	**Peña** (4–3)	Nipper (1–3)	**Orosco** (6)	2:49	32,179	51–36	W3
88	July 16	10:20 a.m. PDT	@ Cubs	**T** 2–2 (9)	—	—	—	2:22	32,843	51–36–1	T1
89 (1)	July 17	10:20 a.m. PDT	@ Cubs	**W** 4–1	**Belcher** (6–4)	Pico (3–5)	**Peña** (8)	2:52	—	52–36–1	W1
90 (2)	July 17	1:47 p.m. PDT	@ Cubs	**W** 5–2	**Holton** (5–2)	Lancaster (4–5)	**Howell** (10)	2:42	35,138	53–36–1	W2
91	July 18	5:35 p.m. PDT	@ Cardinals	**W** 1–0	**Leary** (9–6)	Worrell (4–7)	—	2:34	29,358	54–36–1	W3
92	July 19	5:35 p.m. PDT	@ Cardinals	L 2–3	DeLeón (6–7)	**Brennan** (0–1)	Worrell (17)	2:47	34,606	54–37–1	L1
93	July 20	10:35 a.m. PDT	@ Cardinals	L 7–8	Costello (3–0)	**Valenzuela** (5–7)	Worrell (18)	3:20	31,845	54–38–1	L2
94	July 21	4:35 p.m. PDT	@ Pirates	L 2–3	Drabek (8–5)	**Hershiser** (13–5)	Gott (15)	2:42	27,510	54–39–1	L3
95	July 22	4:35 p.m. PDT	@ Pirates	**W** 4–2	**Belcher** (7–4)	Dunne (6–8)	**Howell** (11)	3:06	44,888	55–39–1	W1
96	July 23	4:37 p.m. PDT	@ Pirates	**W** 6–2	**Leary** (10–6)	Smiley (9–6)	—	2:46	35,817	56–39–1	W2
97	July 24	10:36 a.m. PDT	@ Pirates	**W** 2–1	**Hillegas** (3–2)	Fisher (6–7)	**Howell** (12)	3:00	35,677	57–39–1	W3
98	July 25	5:17 p.m. PDT	@ Giants	L 1–3	Downs (10–8)	**Valenzuela** (5–8)	—	2:50	29,947	57–40–1	L1
99 (1)	July 26	5:35 p.m. PDT	@ Giants	**W** 7–3	**Hershiser** (14–5)	Mulholland (2–1)	**Howell** (13)	2:57	—	58–40–1	W1
100 (2)	July 26	9:10 p.m. PDT	@ Giants	**W** 6–5 (11)	**Holton** (6–2)	Garrelts (2–1)	—	4:13	49,209	59–40–1	W2
101	July 27	7:35 p.m. PDT	@ Giants	L 1–2 (10)	Price (1–4)	**Leary** (10–7)	—	2:51	34,168	59–41–1	L1
102	July 29	7:37 p.m. PDT	Astros	L 1–3	Scott (10–3)	**Hillegas** (3–3)	—	2:17	48,268	59–42–1	L2
103	July 30	12:22 p.m. PDT	Astros	L 6–14	Darwin (4–9)	**Holton** (6–3)	—	3:12	35,835	59–43–1	L3
104	July 31	1:05 p.m. PDT	Astros	**W** 6–1	**Hershiser** (15–5)	Deshaies (7–8)	—	2:28	44,811	60–43–1	W1

August: 17–12 (Home: 10–6; Away: 7–6)

#	Date	Time (PT)	Opponent	Score	Win	Loss	Save	Time of Game	Attendance	Record	Box Streak
105	August 1	5:14 p.m. PDT	Reds	L 3–4	Jackson (14–5)	**Peña** (4–4)	Murphy (2)	2:58	45,498	60–44–1	L1
106	August 2	7:00 p.m. PDT	Reds	**W** 2–0	**Leary** (11–7)	Rijo (11–6)	—	2:20	44,091	61–44–1	W1
107	August 3	7:36 p.m. PDT	Reds	L 4–7 (11)	Franco (3–5)	**Peña** (4–5)	Murphy (3)	3:12	41,535	61–45–1	L1
108	August 5	5:35 p.m. PDT	@ Astros	L 4–6	Deshaies (8–8)	**Hershiser** (15–6)	Smith (20)	2:59	43,426	61–46–1	L1
109	August 6	5:35 p.m. PDT	@ Astros	**W** 5–3	**Belcher** (8–4)	Ryan (8–9)	**Howell** (14)	2:48	43,521	62–46–1	W1
110	August 7	11:35 a.m. PDT	@ Astros	L 2–4	Knepper (12–3)	**Leary** (11–8)	Agosto (3)	2:48	40,339	62–47–1	L1
111	August 8	5:35 p.m. PDT	@ Astros	L 0–10	Scott (12–3)	**Hillegas** (3–4)	—	2:53	39,786	62–48–1	L2
112	August 9	5:09 p.m. PDT	@ Reds	L 0–6	Jackson (15–5)	**Sutton** (3–6)	—	2:17	32,824	62–49–1	L3
113	August 10	4:36 p.m. PDT	@ Reds	**W** 8–5	**Hershiser** (16–6)	Rijo (11–8)	—	3:06	30,809	63–49–1	W1
114	August 11	4:35 p.m. PDT	@ Reds	L 8–9 (10)	Franco (4–5)	**Howell** (2–3)	—	3:51	30,695	63–50–1	L1
115	August 12	7:38 p.m. PDT	Giants	**W** 7–3	**Leary** (12–8)	Reuschel (15–6)	**Peña** (9)	3:19	48,744	64–50–1	W1
116	August 13	7:10 p.m. PDT	Giants	**W** 2–1 (11)	**Peña** (5–5)	Price (1–5)	—	4:12	47,649	65–50–1	W2
117	August 14	1:08 p.m. PDT	Giants	L 4–15	Downs (12–9)	**Hershiser** (16–7)	Brantley (1)	3:17	45,502	65–51–1	L1
118	August 15	7:35 p.m. PDT	Giants	**W** 1–0	**Belcher** (9–4)	Robinson (4–3)	**Orosco** (7)	2:37	49,306	66–51–1	W1
119	August 16	7:30 p.m. PDT	Phillies	**W** 7–5	**Leary** (13–8)	Carman (9–7)	**Howell** (15)	2:50	32,482	67–51–1	W2
120	August 17	7:38 p.m. PDT	Phillies	**W** 7–2	**Tudor** (7–5)	Maddux (3–3)	—	2:36	42,701	68–51–1	W3
121	August 18	1:05 p.m. PDT	Phillies	**W** 2–1	**Howell** (3–3)	Gross (11–9)	**Orosco** (8)	3:23	34,467	69–51–1	W4
122	August 19	7:37 p.m. PDT	Expos	**W** 2–0	**Hershiser** (17–7)	Martínez (14–9)	—	2:15	36,217	70–51–1	W5
123	August 20	7:35 p.m. PDT	Expos	**W** 4–3	**Howell** (4–3)	Hesketh (3–2)	—	2:41	46,743	71–51–1	W6
124	August 21	1:05 p.m. PDT	Expos	**W** 4–0	**Leary** (14–8)	Heaton (3–9)	—	2:18	39,505	72–51–1	W7
125	August 22	7:35 p.m. PDT	Mets	L 1–7	Gooden (15–6)	**Tudur** (7–6)	—	2:43	49,342	72–52–1	L1
126	August 23	7:38 p.m. PDT	Mets	L 1–5	Cone (13–3)	**Martínez** (0–1)	Myers (18)	3:07	45,512	72–53–1	L2
127	August 24	7:38 p.m. PDT	Mets	L 1–2	Leach (6–1)	**Hershiser** (17–8)	McDowell (14)	2:40	47,115	72–54–1	L3
128	August 26	4:35 p.m. PDT	@ Phillies	**W** 7–2	**Belcher** (10–4)	Freeman (0–2)	—	2:53	27,533	73–54–1	W1
129	August 27	4:06 p.m. PDT	@ Phillies	**W** 4–2	**Leary** (15–8)	Carman (9–9)	**Howell** (16)	3:03	27,324	74–54–1	W2
130	August 28	10:35 a.m. PDT	@ Phillies	**W** 5–0	**Tudor** (8–6)	Gross (11–11)	—	2:54	28,570	75–54–1	W3
131	August 29	4:35 p.m. PDT	@ Expos	**W** 2–1	**Martínez** (1–1)	Martínez (15–10)	**Howell** (17)	2:37	16,002	76–54–1	W4
132	August 30	4:35 p.m. PDT	@ Expos	**W** 4–2	**Hershiser** (18–8)	Holman (2–6)	—	2:23	21,454	77–54–1	W5
133	August 31	4:35 p.m. PDT	@ Expos	L 3–4	Parrett (11–3)	**Peña** (5–6)	—	2:41	12,068	77–55–1	L1

September: 16–11 (Home: 6–5; Away: 7–2)

#	Date	Time (PT)	Opponent	Score	Win	Loss	Save	Time of Game	Attendance	Record	Box Streak
134	September 2	4:35 p.m. PDT	@ Mets	L 0–8	Darling (15–9)	**Leary** (14–9)	—	2:28	44,889	77–56–1	L2
135	September 3	11:30 a.m. PDT	@ Mets	L 1–2	Gooden (16–6)	**Tudor** (8–7)	Myers (21)	2:42	43,896	77–57–1	L3
—	September 4	10:35 a.m. PDT	@ Mets	Canceled (rain); Makeup: No rescheduling							
136	September 5	4:40 p.m. PDT	@ Braves	**W** 3–0	**Hershiser** (19–8)	Mahler (9–13)	—	2:24	10,768	78–57–1	W1
137	September 6	11:42 a.m. PDT	@ Braves	L 1–2	Assenmaacher (7–6)	**Orosco** (2–2)	Sutter (13)	2:46	7,245	78–58–1	L1
138	September 7	7:38 p.m. PDT	Astros	**W** 4–1	**Leary** (15–9)	Scott (13–6)	**Howell** (18)	3:03	35,874	79–58–1	W1
139	September 8	7:38 p.m. PDT	Astros	L 1–2	Ryan (11–11)	**Tudor** (8–8)	—	2:40	36,504	79–59–1	L1
140	September 9	7:39 p.m. PDT	Reds	L 2–5	Jackson (21–6)	**Martínez** (1–2)	—	2:53	42,557	79–60–1	L2
141	September 10	7:05 p.m. PDT	Reds	**W** 5–0	**Hershiser** (20–8)	Charlton (1–4)	—	2:31	42,393	80–60–1	W1
142	September 11	1:05 p.m. PDT	Reds	**W** 5–3	**Crews** (4–0)	Franco (5–6)	—	2:55	40,635	81–60–1	W2
143	September 12	7:35 p.m. PDT	Braves	**W** 5–4	**Leary** (17–9)	Glavine (6–16)	**Peña** (10)	2:24	24,578	82–60–1	W3
144	September 13	7:38 p.m. PDT	Braves	**W** 2–0	**Tudor** (9–8)	Smoltz (2–5)	**Howell** (19)	2:37	22,758	83–60–1	W4
145	September 14	7:37 p.m. PDT	Braves	**W** 1–0	**Hershiser** (21–8)	Mahler (9–15)	—	2:15	42,434	84–60–1	W5
146	September 16	7:02 p.m. PDT	@ Reds	L 0–1	Browning (16–5)	**Belcher** (10–5)	—	1:51	16,591	84–61–1	L1
147	September 17	4:06 p.m. PDT	@ Reds	**W** 4–3	**Orosco** (3–2)	Murphy (0–6)	**Howell** (20)	3:09	31,328	85–61–1	W1
148	September 18	10:00 a.m. PDT	@ Reds	**W** 2–0	**Tudor** (10–8)	Williams (3–2)	**Peña** (11)	2:39	24,156	86–61–1	W2
149	September 19	5:35 p.m. PDT	@ Astros	**W** 1–0	**Hershiser** (22–8)	Darwin (7–12)	—	2:20	16,173	87–61–1	W3
150	September 20	2:00 p.m. PDT	@ Astros	**W** 6–0	**Belcher** (11–5)	Forsch (10–6)	—	2:28	12,291	88–61–1	W4
151 (1)	September 21	5:05 p.m. PDT	Padres	L 3–9	Rasmussen (15–9)	**Martínez** (1–3)	—	2:44	—	88–62–1	L1
152 (2)	September 21	8:25 p.m. PDT	Padres	**W** 6–5 (10)	**Howell** (5–3)	Davis (5–10)	—	3:29	31,120	89–62–1	W1
153	September 22	7:35 p.m. PDT	Padres	L 4–5	Show (15–11)	**Peña** (5–7)	—	2:45	30,074	89–63–1	L1
154	September 23	7:39 p.m. PDT	@ Giants	**W** 3–0	**Hershiser** (23–8)	Hammaker (8–9)	—	2:38	22,341	90–63–1	W1
155	September 24	1:05 p.m. PDT	@ Giants	**W** 7–3	**Horton** (1–0)	Wilson (0–2)	**Orosco** (9)	3:03	34,214	91–63–1	W2
156	September 25	1:00 p.m. PDT	@ Giants	L 0–2	Cook (2–0)	**Belcher** (11–6)	—	2:25	40,743	91–64–1	L1
157	September 26	7:07 p.m PDT	@ Padres	**W** 3–2	**Peña** (6–7)	Rasmussen (15–10)	**Howell** (21)	2:53	18,552	92–64–1	W1
158	September 27	7:05 p.m. PDT	@ Padres	L 4–8	Show (16–11)	**Leary** (17–10)	—	2:39	13,325	92–65–1	L1
159	September 28	7:10 p.m. PDT	@ Padres	L 1–2 (16)	Leiper (3–0)	**Horton** (1–1)	—	4:24	22,596	92–66–1	L2
160	September 30	7:35 p.m. PDT	Giants	**W** 6–4	**Holton** (7–3)	Cook (2–1)	**Peña** (12)	2:56	42,580	93–66–1	W1

October: 1–1 (Home: 1–1; Away: 0–0)

#	Date	Time (PT)	Opponent	Score	Win	Loss	Save	Time of Game	Attendance	Record	Box Streak
161	October 1	1:07 p.m. PDT	Giants	**W** 2–1	**Belcher** (12–6)	Reuschel (19–11)	**Valenzuela** (1)	2:09	33,951	94–66–1	W2
162	October 2	1:09 p.m. PDT	Giants	L 0–1	Robinson (10–5)	**Leary** (17–11)	—	2:31	44,055	94–67–1	L1

=== Detailed records ===
**National League**
Opponent	Home	Away	Total	Pct.	Runs scored	Runs allowed
**NL East**
Chicago Cubs	2–4	6–0	8–4	.667	44	37
Montreal Expos	4–2	4–2	8–4	.667	35	25
New York Mets	0–6	1–5	1–11	.083	18	49
Philadelphia Phillies	5–1	6–0	11–1	.917	61	27
Pittsburgh Pirates	3–3	3–3	6–6	.500	54	50
St. Louis Cardinals	4–2	3–3	7–5	.583	59	48
	**18–18**	**23–13**	**41–31**	**.569**	**271**	**233**
**NL West**
Atlanta Braves	7–2	7–2	14–4	.778	72	50
Cincinnati Reds	5–4	6–3	11–7	.611	83	70
Houston Astros	4–5	5–4	9–9	.500	66	66
**Los Angeles Dodgers**	—	—	—	—	—	—
San Diego Padres	5–4	2–7	7–11	.389	67	69
San Francisco Giants	6–3	6–3	12–6	.667	67	51
	**27–18**	**26–19**	**53–37**	**.589**	**355**	**308**

==== Month-by-Month ====
Month	Games	Won	Lost	Win %	RS	RA
April	20	13	7	0.650	85	57
May	27	14	13	0.519	117	99
June	28	17	11	0.607	131	106
July	29	16	12	0.571	109	100
August	29	17	12	0.586	104	109
September	27	16	11	0.593	80	71
October	2	1	1	0.500	2	2
Total	162	94	67	0.584	628	544

	Games	Won	Lost	Win %	RS	RA
Home	81	45	36	0.556	316	297
Road	81	49	31	0.613	312	247
Total	162	94	67	0.584	628	544

=== Composite Box ===
1988 Los Angeles Dodgers Inning–by–Inning Boxscore
Team	1	2	3	4	5	6	7	8	9	10	11	12	13	14	15	16	R	H	E
Opponents	62	54	73	61	61	66	47	63	45	5	5	0	0	0	0	2	544	1291	145
Dodgers	94	47	50	104	73	57	63	70	60	4	3	1	0	1	0	1	628	1346	142

=== Postseason Game log ===
1988 Postseason game log: 8–4 (Home: 4–2; Away: 4–2)
NL Championship Series: vs. New York Mets 4–3 (Home: 2–2; Away: 2–1)

#	Date	Time (PT)	Opponent	Score	Win	Loss	Save	Time of Game	Attendance	Series	Box Streak
1	October 4	5:28 p.m. PDT	Mets	L 2–3	Myers (1–0)	**Howell** (0–1)	—	2:45	55,582	NYN 1–0	L1
2	October 5	7:08 p.m. PDT	Mets	**W** 6–3	**Belcher** (1–0)	Cone (0–1)	**Peña** (1)	3:10	55,780	TIE 1–1	W1
—	October 7	5:28 p.m. PDT	@ Mets	Postponed (rain); Makeup: October 8							
3	October 8	9:20 a.m. PDT	@ Mets	L 4–8	Myers (2–0)	**Peña** (0–1)	—	3:44	44,672	NYN 2–1	L1
4	October 9	5:22 p.m. PDT	@ Mets	**W** 5–4 (12)	**Peña** (1–1)	McDowell (0-1)	**Hershiser** (1)	4:29	54,014	TIE 2–2	W1
5	October 10	9:00 a.m. PDT	@ Mets	**W** 7–4	**Belcher** (2–0)	Fernandez (0–1)	**Holton** (1)	3:07	52,069	LAN 3–2	W2
6	October 11	5:22 p.m. PDT	Mets	L 1–5	Cone (1–1)	**Leary** (0–1)	—	3:16	55,885	TIE 3–3	L1
7	October 12	5:22 p.m. PDT	Mets	**W** 6–0	**Hershiser** (1–0)	Darling (0–1)	—	2:51	55,693	LAN 4–3	W1

World Series: vs. Oakland Athletics 4–1 (Home: 2–0; Away: 2–1)

#	Date	Time (PT)	Opponent	Score	Win	Loss	Save	Time of Game	Attendance	Series	Box Streak
1	October 15	5:30 p.m. PDT	Athletics	**W** 5–4	**Peña** (1–0)	Eckersley (0–1)	—	3:04	55,983	LAN 1–0	W1
2	October 16	5:25 p.m. PDT	Athletics	**W** 6–0	**Hershiser** (1–0)	Davis (0–1)	—	2:30	56,051	LAN 2–0	W2
3	October 18	5:30 p.m. PDT	@ Athletics	L 1–2	Honeycutt (1–0)	**Howell** (0–1)	—	3:21	49,316	LAN 2–1	L1
4	October 19	5:25 p.m. PDT	@ Athletics	**W** 4–3	**Belcher** (1–0)	Stewart (0–1)	**Howell** (1)	3:05	49,317	LAN 3–1	W1
5	October 20	5:39 p.m. PDT	@ Athletics	**W** 5–2	**Hershiser** (2–0)	Davis (0–2)	—	2:51	49,317	LAN 4–1	W2

== Starting Lineups ==
=== Regular Season ===
==== Batting Order ====
1988 Regular Season Batting Order game log
April

#	Date	Opponent	1st	2nd	3rd	4th	5th	6th	7th	8th	9th

May

#	Date	Opponent	1st	2nd	3rd	4th	5th	6th	7th	8th	9th
37	May 20	NYM									
38	May 21	NYM									
39	May 22	NYM									
46	May 30	@ NYM									
47	May 31	@ NYM									

June

#	Date	Opponent	1st	2nd	3rd	4th	5th	6th	7th	8th	9th
48	June 1	@ NYM									

July

#	Date	Opponent	1st	2nd	3rd	4th	5th	6th	7th	8th	9th

August

#	Date	Opponent	1st	2nd	3rd	4th	5th	6th	7th	8th	9th
125	August 22	NYM									
126	August 23	NYM									
127	August 24	NYM									

September

#	Date	Opponent	1st	2nd	3rd	4th	5th	6th	7th	8th	9th
134	September 2	@ NYM									
135	September 3	@ NYM									

October

#	Date	Opponent	1st	2nd	3rd	4th	5th	6th	7th	8th	9th

==== Defensive Lineup ====
1988 Regular Season Defensive Lineup game log
April

#	Date	Opponent	C	1B	2B	3B	SS	LF	CF	RF	P

May

#	Date	Opponent	C	1B	2B	3B	SS	LF	CF	RF	P
37	May 20	NYM									
38	May 21	NYM									
39	May 22	NYM									
46	May 30	@ NYM									
47	May 31	@ NYM									

June

#	Date	Opponent	C	1B	2B	3B	SS	LF	CF	RF	P
48	June 1	@ NYM									

July

#	Date	Opponent	C	1B	2B	3B	SS	LF	CF	RF	P

August

#	Date	Opponent	C	1B	2B	3B	SS	LF	CF	RF	P
125	August 22	NYM									
126	August 23	NYM									
127	August 24	NYM									

September

#	Date	Opponent	C	1B	2B	3B	SS	LF	CF	RF	P
134	September 2	@ NYM									
135	September 3	@ NYM									

October

#	Date	Opponent	C	1B	2B	3B	SS	LF	CF	RF	P

=== Postseason ===
==== Batting Order ====
1988 Postseason Batting Order game log
NL Championship Series: vs. New York Mets

#	Date	Opponent	1st	2nd	3rd	4th	5th	6th	7th	8th	9th
1	October 4	NYM									
2	October 5	NYM									
3	October 8	@ NYM									
4	October 9	@ NYM									
5	October 10	@ NYM									
6	October 11	NYM									
7	October 12	NYM									

World Series: vs. Oakland Athletics

#	Date	Opponent	1st	2nd	3rd	4th	5th	6th	7th	8th	9th
1	October 15	OAK									
2	October 16	OAK									
3	October 18	@ OAK									
4	October 19	@ OAK									
5	October 20	@ OAK									

==== Defensive Lineup ====
1988 Postseason Defensive Lineup game log
NL Championship Series: vs. New York Mets

#	Date	Opponent	C	1B	2B	3B	SS	LF	CF	RF	P
1	October 4	NYM									
2	October 5	NYM									
3	October 8	@ NYM									
4	October 9	@ NYM									
5	October 10	@ NYM									
6	October 11	NYM									
7	October 12	NYM									

World Series: vs. Oakland Athletics

#	Date	Opponent	C	1B	2B	3B	SS	LF	CF	RF	P
1	October 15	OAK									
2	October 16	OAK									
3	October 18	@ OAK									
4	October 19	@ OAK									
5	October 20	@ OAK									

== Game Umpires ==
=== Regular Season ===
1988 Regular Season Umpire game log
April

#	Date	Opponent	HP	1B	2B	3B

May

#	Date	Opponent	HP	1B	2B	3B
37	May 20	NYM	#15; Jim Quick	#26; Dave Pallone	(none)	#9; John Kibler (crew chief)
38	May 21	NYM	#26; Dave Pallone	#9; John Kibler (crew chief)	#7; Larry Poncino	#15; Jim Quick
39	May 22	NYM	#9; John Kibler (crew chief)	#7; Larry Poncino	#15; Jim Quick	#26; Dave Pallone
46	May 30	@ NYM	#8; Dave Harvey (crew chief)	#14; Frank Pulli	#27; Steve Rippley	#2; Jerry Crawford
47	May 31	@ NYM	#14; Frank Pulli	#27; Steve Rippley	#2; Jerry Crawford	#8; Dave Harvey (crew chief)

June

#	Date	Opponent	HP	1B	2B	3B
48	June 1	@ NYM	#27; Steve Rippley	#2; Jerry Crawford	#8; Dave Harvey (crew chief)	#14; Frank Pulli

July

#	Date	Opponent	HP	1B	2B	3B

August

#	Date	Opponent	HP	1B	2B	3B
125	August 22	NYM	#5; Bob Engel (crew chief)	#22; Joe West	#17; Paul Runge	#25; Charlie Williams
126	August 23	NYM	#22; Joe West	#17; Paul Runge	#25; Charlie Williams	#5; Bob Engel (crew chief)
127	August 24	NYM	#17; Paul Runge	#25; Charlie Williams	#5; Bob Engel (crew chief)	#22; Joe West

September

#	Date	Opponent	HP	1B	2B	3B
134	September 2	@ NYM	#16; Dutch Rennert	#32; Dana DeMuth	#21; Harry Wendelstedt (crew chief)	#30; Randy Marsh
135	September 3	@ NYM	#32; Dana DeMuth	#21; Harry Wendelstedt (crew chief)	#30; Randy Marsh	#16; Dutch Rennert

October

#	Date	Opponent	HP	1B	2B	3B

=== Postseason ===
1988 Postseason Umpire game log
NL Championship Series: vs. New York Mets

#	Date	Opponent	HP	1B	2B	3B	LF	RF
1	October 4	NYM	#21; Harry Wendelstedt (crew chief)	#10; John McSherry	#22; Joe West	#16; Dutch Rennert	#31; Bob Davidson	#17; Paul Runge
2	October 5	NYM	#10; John McSherry	#22; Joe West	#16; Dutch Rennert	#31; Bob Davidson	#17; Paul Runge	#21; Harry Wendelstedt (crew chief)
3	October 8	@ NYM	#22; Joe West	#16; Dutch Rennert	#31; Bob Davidson	#17; Paul Runge	#21; Harry Wendelstedt (crew chief)	#10; John McSherry
4	October 9	@ NYM	#16; Dutch Rennert	#31; Bob Davidson	#17; Paul Runge	#21; Harry Wendelstedt (crew chief)	#10; John McSherry	#22; Joe West
5	October 10	@ NYM	#31; Bob Davidson	#17; Paul Runge	#21; Harry Wendelstedt (crew chief)	#10; John McSherry	#22; Joe West	#16; Dutch Rennert
6	October 11	NYM	#17; Paul Runge	#21; Harry Wendelstedt (crew chief)	#10; John McSherry	#22; Joe West	#16; Dutch Rennert	#31; Bob Davidson
7	October 12	NYM	#21; Harry Wendelstedt (crew chief)	#10; John McSherry	#22; Joe West	#16; Dutch Rennert	#31; Bob Davidson	#17; Paul Runge

World Series: vs. Oakland Athletics

#	Date	Opponent	HP	1B	2B	3B	LF	RF
1	October 15	OAK	#8; Dave Harvey (NL) (crew chief)	#33; Durwood Merrill (AL)	#6; Bruce Froemming (NL)	#13; Derryl Cousins (AL)	#2; Jerry Crawford (NL)	#10; Larry McCoy (AL)
2	October 16	OAK	#33; Durwood Merrill (AL)	#6; Bruce Froemming (NL)	#13; Derryl Cousins (AL)	#2; Jerry Crawford (NL)	#10; Larry McCoy (AL)	#8; Dave Harvey (NL) (crew chief)
3	October 18	@ OAK	#6; Bruce Froemming (NL)	#13; Derryl Cousins (AL)	#2; Jerry Crawford (NL)	#10; Larry McCoy (AL)	#8; Dave Harvey (NL) (crew chief)	#33; Durwood Merrill (AL)
4	October 19	@ OAK	#13; Derryl Cousins (AL)	#2; Jerry Crawford (NL)	#10; Larry McCoy (AL)	#8; Dave Harvey (NL) (crew chief)	#33; Durwood Merrill (AL)	#6; Bruce Froemming (NL)
5	October 20	@ OAK	#2; Jerry Crawford (NL)	#10; Larry McCoy (AL)	#8; Dave Harvey (NL) (crew chief)	#33; Durwood Merrill (AL)	#6; Bruce Froemming (NL)	#13; Derryl Cousins (AL)

== Player stats ==
=== Starters by position ===
Note: Pos = Position; G = Games played; AB = At bats; H = Hits; Avg. = Batting average; HR = Home runs; RBI = Runs batted in

Pos	Player	G	AB	R	H	Avg.	HR	RBI	SB
C	Mike Scioscia	130	408	29	105	.257	3	35	0
1B	Franklin Stubbs	115	242	30	54	.223	8	34	11
2B	Steve Sax	160	632	70	175	.277	5	57	42
3B	Jeff Hamilton	111	309	34	73	.236	6	33	0
SS	Alfredo Griffin	95	316	39	63	.199	1	27	7
LF	Kirk Gibson	150	542	106	157	.290	25	76	31
CF	John Shelby	140	494	65	130	.263	10	64	16
RF	Mike Marshall	144	542	63	150	.277	20	82	4

=== Other batters ===
Note: G = Games played; AB = At bats; H = Hits; Avg. = Batting average; HR = Home runs; RBI = Runs batted in

Player	G	AB	R	H	Avg.	HR	RBI	SB
Dave Anderson	116	285	31	71	.249	2	20	4
Mike Davis	108	281	29	55	.196	2	17	7
Pedro Guerrero	59	215	24	64	.298	5	35	2
Mickey Hatcher	88	191	22	56	.293	1	25	0
Tracy Woodson	65	173	15	43	.249	3	15	1
Rick Dempsey	77	167	25	42	.251	7	30	1
Danny Heep	95	149	14	36	.242	0	11	2
Mike Sharperson	46	59	8	16	.271	0	4	0
Mike Devereaux	30	43	4	5	.116	0	2	0
José González	37	24	7	2	.083	0	0	3
Chris Gwynn	12	11	1	2	.182	0	0	0
Gilberto Reyes	5	9	1	1	.111	0	0	0

== Pitching ==
=== Starting pitchers ===
Note: G = Games pitched; GS = Games started; IP = Innings pitched; W = Wins; L = Losses; ERA = Earned run average; BB = Walks allowed; SO = Strikeouts; CG = Complete games

Player	G	GS	IP	W	L	ERA	BB	SO	CG
Orel Hershiser	35	34	267.0	23	8	2.26	73	178	15
Tim Leary	35	35	228.2	17	11	2.91	56	180	9
Tim Belcher	36	27	179.2	12	6	2.91	51	152	4
Fernando Valenzuela	23	22	142.1	5	8	4.24	76	64	3
Don Sutton	16	16	87.1	3	6	3.92	30	44	0
Shawn Hillegas	11	10	56.2	3	4	4.13	17	30	0
John Tudor	9	9	52.1	4	3	2.41	10	32	1
Bill Krueger	1	1	2.1	0	0	11.57	2	1	0

=== Other pitchers ===
Note: G = Games pitched; IP = Innings pitched; W = Wins; L = Losses; ERA = Earned run average; SO = Strikeouts

Player	G	IP	W	L	ERA	SO
Ramón Martínez	9	35.2	1	3	3.79	23
Ken Howell	4	12.2	0	1	6.39	12
William Brennan	4	9.1	0	1	6.75	7

=== Relief pitchers ===
Note: G = Games pitched; IP = Innings pitched; W = Wins; L = Losses; SV = Saves; ERA = Earned run average; BB = Walks allowed; SO = Strikeouts

Player	G	IP	W	L	SV	ERA	BB	SO
Jay Howell	50	65.0	5	3	21	2.08	21	70
Alejandro Peña	60	94.1	6	7	12	1.91	27	83
Jesse Orosco	55	53.0	3	2	9	2.72	30	43
Brian Holton	45	84.2	7	3	1	1.70	26	49
Tim Crews	42	71.2	4	0	0	3.14	16	45
Brad Havens	9	9.2	0	0	0	4.66	4	8
Ricky Horton	12	9.0	1	1	0	5.00	2	8

== Playoffs ==
=== National League Championship Series ===
The Dodgers faced the New York Mets in the LCS. The Mets had dominated the Dodgers during the regular season, winning 10 out of 11 meetings and were heavy favorites going into the series. But the Dodgers, led by series MVP Orel Hershiser (who pitched a complete game shutout in game 7) won the series 4 games to 3.

=== World Series ===
The Dodgers were again heavy underdogs in the World Series against the Oakland Athletics, led by sluggers Mark McGwire and José Canseco. However, the Dodgers won the series in five games thanks to Kirk Gibson's pinch-hit game winning homer in the first game off of Dennis Eckersley and the continued mastery of series MVP Orel Hershiser.

== Awards ==
- 1988 Major League Baseball All-Star Game
  - Orel Hershiser reserve
- National League Most Valuable Player Award
  - Kirk Gibson
- Cy Young Award
  - Orel Hershiser
- Manager of the Year Award
  - Tommy Lasorda
- National League Championship MVP
  - Orel Hershiser
- World Series Most Valuable Player
  - Orel Hershiser
- Gold Glove Award
  - Orel Hershiser
- Comeback Player of the Year Award
  - Tim Leary
- Baseball Digest Rookie All-Star
  - Tim Belcher
- TSN Manager of the Year Award
  - Tommy Lasorda
- TSN Executive of the Year Award
  - Fred Claire
- TSN Rookie Pitcher of the Year Award
  - Tim Belcher
- TSN Pitcher of the Year Award
  - Orel Hershiser
- Silver Slugger Award
  - Tim Leary
  - Kirk Gibson
- TSN Major League Player of the Year Award
  - Orel Hershiser
- TSN National League All-Star
  - Orel Hershiser
- NL Pitcher of the Month
  - Orel Hershiser (April 1988)
  - Orel Hershiser (September 1988)
- NL Player of the Week
  - Tim Leary (July 18–24)
  - Orel Hershiser (Sep. 26-Oct.2)

== Farm system ==
Level	Team	League	Manager
AAA	Albuquerque Dukes	Pacific Coast League	Terry Collins
AA	San Antonio Missions	Texas League	Kevin Kennedy
High A	Bakersfield Dodgers	California League	Gary LaRocque
High A	Vero Beach Dodgers	Florida State League	John Shoemaker
A-Short Season	Salem Dodgers	Northwest League	Tom Beyers
**Rookie**	**Great Falls Dodgers**	**Pioneer League**	**Tim Johnson**
Rookie	Gulf Coast Dodgers	Gulf Coast League	Joe Alvarez

Teams in BOLD won League Championships

== Major League Baseball draft ==
The Dodgers drafted 62 players in this draft. Of those, 11 of them would eventually play Major League baseball. The Dodgers lost their second round pick to the Oakland Athletics as compensation for their signing free agent outfielder Mike Davis.

The top pick in the draft was Pitcher Bill Bene out of California State University, Los Angeles. In nine seasons in the Minors he had a record of 18–34 with a 5.45 ERA in 252 games (49 starts). In 2012, he was arrested and sentenced to six months in prison for operating a counterfeit karaoke business and failing to pay federal taxes.

This draft produced two of the Dodgers top players of the 1990s. In the sixth round they selected first baseman Eric Karros from UCLA. The 1992 Rookie of the Year and a 1995 Silver Slugger Award winner, Karros hit .268 with 284 homers and 1,027 RBI in 14 seasons (12 of them with the Dodgers) and is the L.A. Dodgers all-time home run leader.

In the 62nd round with their last pick of the draft the Dodgers selected Mike Piazza from Miami Dade College as a favor to his father, Vince. Vince was close friends with manager, Tommy Lasorda, who was also a god-father to Mike's brother, Thomas. Piazza would win the 1993 Rookie of the Year Award and was a 12 time All-Star and 10 time Silver Slugger Award winner in his 16 seasons (mostly with the Dodgers and New York Mets). He hit .308 with 427 home runs and 1,335 RBI.

1988 draft picks

Round	Name	Position	School	Signed	Career span	Highest level
1	Bill Bene	RHP	California State University, Los Angeles	Yes	1988–1997	AAA
3	Billy Ashley	OF	Belleville High School	Yes	1988–2001	**MLB**
4	Anthony Collier	OF	Muir High School	Yes	1988–1993	AA
5	Paul Branconier	RHP	Covina High School	Yes	1988–1991	A
6	Eric Karros	1B	University of California, Los Angeles	Yes	1988–2004	**MLB**
7	Jeff Hartsock	RHP	North Carolina State University	Yes	1988–1994	**MLB**
8	Scott Erwin	RHP	Georgia Institute of Technology	No; Athletics-1989	1989–1994	AA
9	Jim Poole	LHP	Georgia Institute of Technology	Yes	1988–2000	**MLB**
10	Eddie Pye	SS	Middle Tennessee State University	Yes	1988–1997	**MLB**
11	Brock McMurray	OF	Southeastern Louisiana University	Yes	1988–1992	A+
12	Jerry Brooks	OF	Clemson University	Yes	1988–1990	**MLB**
13	Christian Morrow	OF	Skyline Junior College	Yes	1988–1995	AAA
14	Dana Allison	LHP	James Madison University	No; Athletics-1989	1989–1994	**MLB**
15	Larry Rice	C	Oregon State University	Yes	1988–1996	AAA
16	Brian Traxler	1B	University of New Orleans	Yes	1988–2000	**MLB**
17	Michael Chiusano	C	Nazareth High School	Yes	1988–1989	Rookie
18	Coleman Smith	OF	Conestoga Valley High School	No; Cubs-1992	1992–1994	A
19	James Wray	LHP	Troy University	Yes	1988–1996	AA
20	Sean McKamie	SS	St. Paul Central High School	Yes	1989–1997	AA
21	Steven Finken	SS	University of Michigan	Yes	1988–1992	AAA
22	Michael St. Esteben	LHP	Chino High School	No		
23	William Wengert	RHP	Iowa State University	Yes	1988–1995	AAA
24	Roderick Harvell	OF	Fairfield High School	Yes	1988–1989	Rookie
25	Michael Sampson	RHP	Holyoke Community College	Yes	1988–1991	A+
26	Ernest Carr	3B	Jacksonville University	Yes	1988–1990	A
27	Mike Munson	RHP	University of Illinois at Urbana–Champaign	No		
28	Eric Ganino	C	Fontana High School	Yes	1988–1989	Rookie
29	John Braase	RHP	College of Idaho	Yes	1988–1990	A+
30	Sean Snedeker	RHP	Texas A&M University	Yes	1988–1993	AA
31	Clayton Enno	LHP	Des Moines Area Community College	Yes	1988–1990	A+
32	Bryan Beals	2B	Chapman University	Yes	1988–1990	A+
33	Cameron Biberdorf	RHP	Mayville State University	Yes	1988–1991	AA
34	Napoleon Robinson	RHP	Columbus State University	Yes	1988–1993	AAA
35	Héctor Ortiz	C	Ranger College	Yes	1988–2005	**MLB**
36	Jeff Castillo	RHP	Mesa State College	Yes	1988	Rookie
37	Bradley Boggetto	RHP	Parkland College	Yes	1989–1991	A-
38	Wendell Zink	3B	Dixie State College of Utah	Yes	1988	A-
39	K. G. White	OF	Georgia Institute of Technology	Yes	1988–1989	A
40	Felix Rios	3B	George Fox University	No		
41	Todd Reische	C	Minooka High School	No		
42	Eric Blackwell	OF	Spartanburg Methodist College	Yes	1989–1991	A+
43	Garey Ingram	C	Columbus High School	No; Dodgers-1989	1990–2002	**MLB**
44	Brent Miller	3B	Jordan High School	No; Orioles-1990	1990–1994	AAA
45	Bradley Cohen	OF	Starkville High School	No		
46	Wilfred Brown	SS	Lurleen B. Wallace Community College	No		
47	Garrett Beard	OF	Spartanburg Methodist College	Yes	1989–1995	AAA
48	Terry Miller	OF	Compton Community College	No		
49	Deon Montgomery	SS	Compton Community College	No		
50	Jose Fernandez	OF	City College of San Francisco	No		
51	Daniel Hancock	RHP	Bremen High School	No		
52	Gaither Bagsby	RHP	Dickson County High School	No		
53	Michael Emmons	RHP	Pensacola Junior College	No		
54	Shannon Zerlang	OF	College of the Redwoods	No		
55	Craig Thomas	OF	Northside High School	No		
56	Dan Frye	SS	Logansport High School	No; Reds-1992	1992–1995	A+
57	Dennis Frye	1B	Logansport High School	No		
58	Mike Vdovkin	RHP	Merced High School	No		
59	Chris Harding	OF	Louisburg College	No		
60	Robert Hoffman	C	J. F. Kennedy High School	No; Dodgers-1989	1990	Rookie
61	Eric Boddie	OF	Creighton University	Yes	1988–1990	A+
62	Mike Piazza	1B	Miami Dade College	Yes	1989–2007	**MLB**

== See also ==
- Orel Hershiser's scoreless innings streak
