= 1987 Los Angeles Dodgers season =

1987 Los Angeles Dodgers
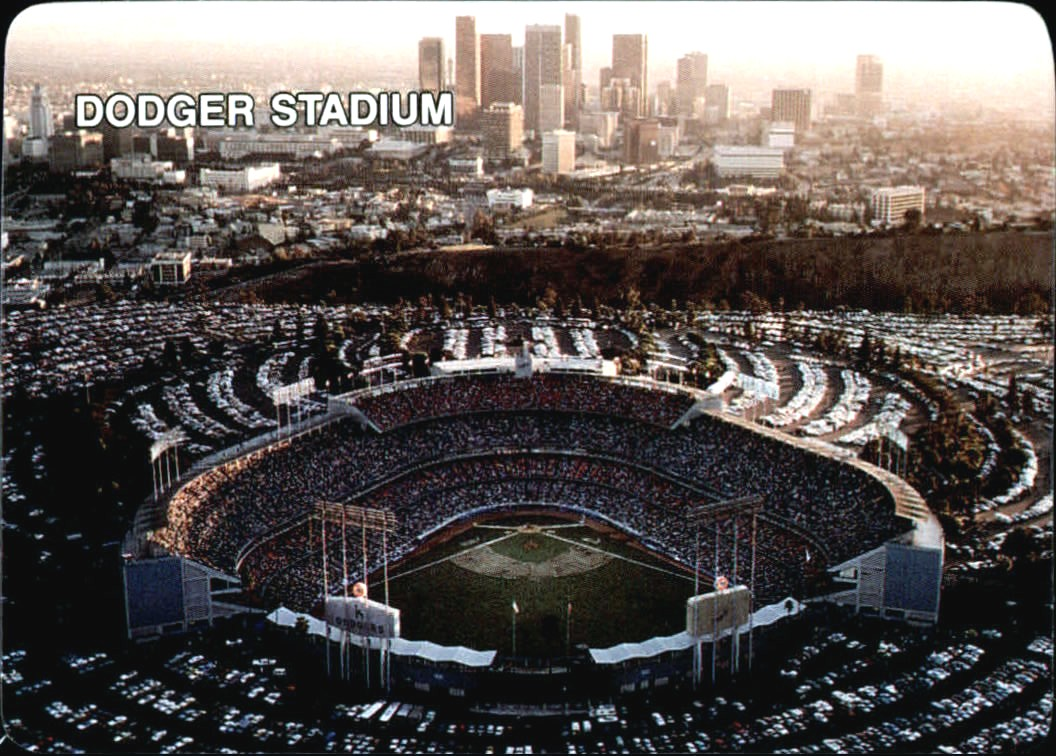
- Dodger Stadium pictured beneath the Los Angeles skyline in 1987.
- League: National League
- Division: West
- Ballpark: Dodger Stadium
- City: Los Angeles
- Record: 73–89 (.451)
- Divisional place: 4th
- Owners: Peter O'Malley
- General managers: Al Campanis, Fred Claire
- Managers: Tommy Lasorda
- Television: KTTV (11); Vin Scully, Jerry Doggett, Ross Porter; Dodgervision; Eddie Doucette, Al Downing, Rick Monday
- Radio: KABC; Vin Scully, Jerry Doggett, Ross Porter; KWKW; Jaime Jarrín, René Cárdenas

The 1987 Los Angeles Dodgers season was the 98th season for the Los Angeles Dodgers franchise in Major League Baseball (MLB), their 30th season in Los Angeles, California, and their 26th season playing their home games at Dodger Stadium. They finished in fourth place in the National League West, with an identical record to the previous season, 73–89.

== Offseason ==
- December 10, 1986: Acquired Matt Young from the Seattle Mariners for Dennis Powell and Mike Watters
- December 10, 1986: Acquired Tim Leary and Tim Crews from the Milwaukee Brewers for Greg Brock
- December 11, 1986: Acquired Alex Treviño from the San Francisco Giants for Candy Maldonado
- December 11, 1986: Acquired Ed Vande Berg from the Seattle Mariners for Steve Yeager

== Regular season ==
=== Season standings ===
NL West
Team	W	L	Pct.	GB	Home	Road
San Francisco Giants	90	72	.556	—	46‍–‍35	44‍–‍37
Cincinnati Reds	84	78	.519	6	42‍–‍39	42‍–‍39
Houston Astros	76	86	.469	14	47‍–‍34	29‍–‍52
Los Angeles Dodgers	73	89	.451	17	40‍–‍41	33‍–‍48
Atlanta Braves	69	92	.429	20½	42‍–‍39	27‍–‍53
San Diego Padres	65	97	.401	25	37‍–‍44	28‍–‍53

=== Record vs. opponents ===
1987 National League record Sources:
Team	ATL	CHC	CIN	HOU	LAD	MON	NYM	PHI	PIT	SD	SF	STL
Atlanta	—	6–5	8–10	8–10	6–12	3–9	7–5	7–5	7–5	6–12	8–10	3–9
Chicago	5–6	—	6–6	8–4	6–6	10–8	9–9	8–10	4–14	9–3	5–7	6–12
Cincinnati	10–8	6–6	—	13–5	10–8	6–6	7–5	5–7	4–8	12–6	7–11	4–8
Houston	10–8	4–8	5–13	—	12–6	7–5	6–6	6–6	6–6	5–13	10–8	5–7
Los Angeles	12–6	6–6	8–10	6–12	—	3–9	6–6	2–10	6–6	11–7	10–8	3–9
Montreal	9–3	8–10	6–6	5–7	9–3	—	8–10	10–8	11–7	9–3	5–7	11–7
New York	5–7	9–9	5–7	6–6	6–6	10–8	—	13–5	12–6	8–4	9–3	9–9
Philadelphia	5–7	10–8	7–5	6–6	10–2	8–10	5–13	—	11–7	8–4	2–10	8–10
Pittsburgh	5–7	14–4	8–4	6–6	6–6	7–11	6–12	7–11	—	8–4	6–6	7–11
San Diego	12–6	3–9	6–12	13–5	7–11	3–9	4–8	4–8	4–8	—	5–13	4–8
San Francisco	10–8	7–5	11–7	8–10	8–10	7–5	3–9	10–2	6–6	13–5	—	7–5
St. Louis	9–3	12–6	8–4	7–5	9–3	7–11	9–9	10–8	11–7	8–4	5–7	—

=== Opening Day starters ===
Name	Position
Steve Sax	Second baseman
Mariano Duncan	Shortstop
Bill Madlock	Third baseman
Mike Marshall	Right fielder
Franklin Stubbs	First baseman
Ken Landreaux	Left fielder
Mike Scioscia	Catcher
Mike Ramsey	Center fielder
Orel Hershiser	Starting pitcher

=== Notable transactions ===
- May 6, 1987: Acquired Orlando Mercado from the Detroit Tigers for Balvino Gálvez
- May 22, 1987: Acquired John Shelby and Brad Havens from the Baltimore Orioles for Tom Niedenfuer
- May 29, 1987: Bill Madlock was released by the Los Angeles Dodgers.
- June 19, 1987: Acquired Phil Garner from the Houston Astros for Jeff Edwards
- June 23, 1987: Acquired Bill Krueger from the Oakland Athletics for Tim Meeks
- August 17, 1987: Acquired Glenn Hoffman from the Boston Red Sox for Billy Bartels
- August 29, 1987: Acquired Tim Belcher from the Oakland Athletics for Rick Honeycutt
- September 21, 1987: Acquired Mike Sharperson from the Toronto Blue Jays for Juan Guzmán

=== Roster ===
1987 Los Angeles Dodgers
Roster
Pitchers: 49 Tim Belcher; 52 Tim Crews; 54 Ron Davis; 41 Brad Havens; 55 Orel Hershiser; 57 Shawn Hillegas; 51 Brian Holton; 40 Rick Honeycutt; 43 Ken Howell; 59 Bill Krueger; 23 Tim Leary; 49 Tom Niedenfuer; 26 Alejandro Peña; 41 Jerry Reuss; 50 Jack Savage; 34 Fernando Valenzuela; 35 Bob Welch; 36 Matt Young	Catchers: 48 Orlando Mercado; 15 Gilberto Reyes; 14 Mike Scioscia; 29 Alex Treviño; Infielders: 10 Dave Anderson; 25 Mariano Duncan; 20 Phil Garner; 33 Jeff Hamilton; 9 Mickey Hatcher; 37 Glenn Hoffman; 12 Bill Madlock; 3 Steve Sax; 60 Mike Sharperson; 38 Craig Shipley; 22 Franklin Stubbs; 56 Brad Wellman; 7 Tracy Woodson	Outfielders: 46 Ralph Bryant; 40 Mike Devereaux; 47 José González; 28 Pedro Guerrero; 45 Chris Gwynn; 12 Danny Heep; 44 Ken Landreaux; 27 Tito Landrum; 5 Mike Marshall; 56 Mike Ramsey; 31 John Shelby; 21 Reggie Williams	Manager: 2 Tommy Lasorda; Coaches: 8 Joey Amalfitano; 58 Mark Cresse; 11 Manny Mota; 16 Ron Perranoski; 18 Bill Russell

== Player stats ==
=== Batting ===
==== Starters by position ====
Note: Pos = Position; G = Games played; AB = At bats; H = Hits; Avg. = Batting average; HR = Home runs; RBI = Runs batted in

Pos	Player	G	AB	H	Avg.	HR	RBI
C	Mike Scioscia	142	461	122	.265	6	38
1B	Franklin Stubbs	129	386	90	.233	16	52
2B	Steve Sax	157	610	171	.280	6	46
3B	Mickey Hatcher	101	287	81	.282	7	42
SS	Mariano Duncan	76	261	56	.215	6	18
LF	Pedro Guerrero	152	545	184	.338	27	89
CF	John Shelby	120	476	132	.277	21	69
RF	Mike Marshall	104	402	118	.294	16	72

==== Other batters ====
Note: G = Games played; AB = At bats; H = Hits; Avg. = Batting average; HR = Home runs; RBI = Runs batted in

Player	G	AB	H	Avg.	HR	RBI
Dave Anderson	108	265	62	.234	1	13
Ken Landreaux	115	182	37	.203	6	23
Alex Treviño	72	144	32	.222	3	16
Tracy Woodson	53	136	31	.228	1	11
Glenn Hoffman	40	132	29	.220	0	10
Phil Garner	70	126	24	.190	2	8
Mike Ramsey	48	125	29	.232	0	12
Danny Heep	60	98	16	.163	0	9
Jeff Hamilton	35	83	18	.217	0	1
Ralph Bryant	46	69	17	.246	2	10
Tito Landrum	51	67	16	.239	1	4
Bill Madlock	21	61	11	.180	3	7
Mike Devereaux	19	54	12	.222	0	4
Reggie Williams	39	36	4	.111	0	4
Craig Shipley	26	35	9	.257	0	2
Mike Sharperson	10	33	9	.273	0	1
Chris Gwynn	17	32	7	.219	0	2
José González	19	16	3	.188	0	1
Len Matuszek	16	15	1	.067	0	0
Orlando Mercado	7	5	3	.600	0	1
Brad Wellman	3	4	1	.250	0	1
Gilberto Reyes	1	0	0	----	0	0

=== Pitching ===
==== Starting pitchers ====
Note: G = Games pitched; IP = Innings pitched; W = Wins; L = Losses; ERA = Earned run average; SO = Strikeouts

Player	G	IP	W	L	ERA	SO
Orel Hershiser	37	264.2	16	16	3.06	190
Bob Welch	35	251.2	15	9	3.22	196
Fernando Valenzuela	34	251.0	14	14	3.98	190
Shawn Hillegas	12	58.0	4	3	3.57	51
Tim Belcher	6	34.0	4	2	2.38	23

==== Other pitchers ====
Note: G = Games pitched; IP = Innings pitched; W = Wins; L = Losses; ERA = Earned run average; SO = Strikeouts

Player	G	IP	W	L	ERA	SO
Rick Honeycutt	27	115.2	2	12	4.59	92
Tim Leary	39	107.2	3	11	4.76	61
Alejandro Peña	37	87.1	2	7	3.50	76

==== Relief pitchers ====
Note: G = Games pitched; W = Wins; L = Losses; SV = Saves; ERA = Earned run average; SO = Strikeouts

Player	G	W	L	SV	ERA	SO
Matt Young	47	5	8	11	4.47	42
Brian Holton	53	3	2	2	3.89	58
Ken Howell	40	3	4	1	4.91	60
Brad Havens	31	0	0	1	4.33	23
Tim Crews	20	1	1	3	2.48	20
Tom Niedenfuer	15	1	0	1	2.76	10
Ron Davis	4	0	0	0	6.75	1
Jack Savage	3	0	0	0	2.70	0
Bill Krueger	2	0	0	0	0.00	2
Jerry Reuss	1	0	0	0	4.50	2

== 1987 awards ==
- 1987 Major League Baseball All-Star Game
  - Pedro Guerrero reserve
  - Orel Hershiser reserve
- Comeback Player of the Year Award
  - Pedro Guerrero
- NL Pitcher of the Month
  - Orel Hershiser (June 1987)
- NL Player of the Week
  - Orel Hershiser (June 8–14)
  - Alejandro Peña (Sep. 28-Oct.4)

== Farm system ==
Level	Team	League	Manager
**AAA**	**Albuquerque Dukes**	**Pacific Coast League**	**Terry Collins**
AA	San Antonio Dodgers	Texas League	Gary LaRocque
High A	Bakersfield Dodgers	California League	Kevin Kennedy
High A	Vero Beach Dodgers	Florida State League	John Shoemaker
Rookie	Great Falls Dodgers	Pioneer League	Tim Johnson
**Rookie**	**Gulf Coast Dodgers**	**Gulf Coast League**	**Joe Alvarez**

Teams in BOLD won League Championships

== Major League Baseball draft ==
The draft was altered this year and the January drafts and the secondary phase of the June draft were eliminated, leaving just the one June draft, which was expanded to more rounds to allow the Junior College players to be included. The Dodgers drafted 51 players in this draft, the largest collection of players they had ever drafted in one draft. Of those, ten of them would eventually play Major League baseball.

The top pick in this years draft was right-handed pitcher Dan Opperman from Valley High School in Las Vegas, Nevada. However, Opperman injured his arm pitching in the state high school playoffs his Senior season and would not be able to pitch professionally until 1989. He would eventually play in parts of four seasons with the Dodgers farm teams in Vero Beach, San Antonio and the last two with the AAA Albuquerque Dukes. In 63 games (all but one as a starter) he had a record of 19-22 and an ERA of 3.95.

None of the players from this years draft left much of an impression on the Majors. Pitchers Dennis Springer and Mike James had the longest careers.

1987 draft picks

Round	Name	Position	School	Signed	Career span	Highest level
1	Dan Opperman	RHP	Valley High School	Yes	1989–1992	AAA
2	Donald Carroll	OF	Granite Hills High School	Yes	1988–1999	A+
3	Chris Nichting	RHP	Northwestern University	Yes	1988–2002	**MLB**
4	Thomas Demerit	OF	Dartmouth College	Yes	1987–1988	A
5	Luis Martinez	SS	Old Dominion University	Yes	1987–1993	AAA
6	Darrin Fletcher	C	University of Illinois at Urbana–Champaign	Yes	1987–2002	**MLB**
7	Tony Barron	3B	Willamette University	Yes	1987–2002	**MLB**
8	Howie Freiling	1B	University of North Carolina at Chapel Hill	Yes	1987–1990	AAA
9	Lem Luckham	RHP	Los Amigos High School	Yes	1987–1992	AA
10	Douglas Noch	RHP	Central Michigan University	Yes	1987–1989	A
11	Lawrence Gonzalez	RHP	Don Antonio Lugo High School	Yes	1987–1989	A-
12	Barry Blackwell	C	Florida State University	No; Indians-1988	1988–1990	AA
13	Sherman Collins	RHP	University of Oklahoma	Yes	1987	A
14	D. J. Floyd	C	Chino High School	Yes	1987–1990	A
15	Alan Lewis	SS	Davidson College	Yes	1987–1993	AA
16	John Wanish	RHP	Florida State University	Yes	1987–1991	A+
17	Bruce Dostal	OF	William Paterson University	Yes	1987–1995	AAA
18	Steve Green	OF	Georgia Institute of Technology	Yes	1987–1993	A+
19	Rafael Bournigal	IF	Florida State University	Yes	1987–2000	**MLB**
20	Jose Munoz	SS	Florida College	Yes	1987–2001	**MLB**
21	Dennis Springer	RHP	California State University, Fresno	Yes	1987–2002	**MLB**
22	Mike Parks	RHP	University of Miami	No		
23	Daniel Kreuder	RHP	Pace University	Yes	1987	Rookie
24	Randal Wadsworth	C	California University of Pennsylvania	Yes	1987	Rookie
25	Frank Mustari	3B	Illinois State University	Yes	1987–1988	A
26	Brian Emmert	1B	Pace University	Yes	1987	Rookie
27	Dan Piscetta	RHP	College of Wooster	No		
28	David Martin	RHP	Phillips University	Yes	1987	Rookie
29	Zak Shinall	RHP	El Camino College	Yes	1987–1995	**MLB**
30	Todd Melisauskas	C	Shippensburg University of Pennsylvania	Yes	1987–1988	A
31	Eric Johnson	OF	California State University, Sacramento	Yes	1987	Rookie
32	William Argo	OF	Iowa State University	Yes	1987–1989	A
33	Chris Harding	OF	Clover High School	No		
34	Jim Poole	LHP	Georgia Institute of Technology	No; Dodgers-1988	1988–2000	**MLB**
35	Brian Currie	LHP	University of South Carolina	Yes	1987–1990	A-
36	Garrett Carter	3B	University of South Carolina	No; Braves-1988	1988	Rookie
37	Jeff Herman	OF	De Anza College	No		
38	Larry Rezny	LHP	Grand Haven High School	No		
39	Brett Magnusson	OF	Santa Rosa Junior College	Yes	1988–1994	AAA
40	Jerry Lutterman	RHP	Lafayette High School	No		
41	James Robinson	RHP	Sullivan High School	No; White Sox-1989	1989	Rookie
42	Joseph Fernandez	OF	Galileo High School	Yes	1987	Rookie
43	Mike James	RHP	Lurleen B. Wallace Community College	Yes	1988–2002	**MLB**
44	Christopher Gettler	RHP	Jacksonville University	Yes	1987–1988	A
45	Doug Simons	LHP	Pepperdine University	No; Twins-1988	1988–1996	**MLB**
46	Sam Bland	C	Kishwaukee College	Yes	1987	Rookie
47	Albert Bustillos	RHP	Gavilan College	Yes	1988–1996	AAA
48	Ken Woods	SS	Palisades High School	No		
49	Troy Arrington	RHP	Jordan High School	No		
50	Vince Muldrew	OF	Centennial High School	No		
51	Andrew Perkens	C	Blair High School	No		
