= 1988 New York Mets season =

1988 New York Mets
- National League East champions
- League: National League
- Division: East
- Ballpark: Shea Stadium
- City: New York
- Record: 100–60 (.625)
- Divisional place: 1st
- Owners: Fred Wilpon and Nelson Doubleday, Jr.
- General manager: Frank Cashen
- Manager: Davey Johnson
- Television: WWOR-TV/SportsChannel New York (Ralph Kiner, Steve Zabriskie, Tim McCarver, Fran Healy, Rusty Staub)
- Radio: WFAN (Bob Murphy, Gary Thorne, Charlie Slowes); WJIT (Spanish) (Juan Alicea, Billy Berroa)

The 1988 New York Mets season was the 27th regular season for the Mets. They went 100–60 and finished first in the National League East. They were managed by Davey Johnson. They played home games at Shea Stadium.

The Mets would go on to lose to the eventual World Series champion Los Angeles Dodgers in the NLCS in seven games.

== Offseason ==
- December 11, 1987: Jesse Orosco was traded as part of a 3-team trade by the Mets to the Los Angeles Dodgers. The Dodgers sent Jack Savage to the Mets, and the Oakland Athletics sent Kevin Tapani and Wally Whitehurst to the Mets. The Dodgers sent Bob Welch and Matt Young to the Athletics, and the Athletics sent Alfredo Griffin and Jay Howell to the Dodgers.
- December 11, 1987: Rafael Santana and Victor Garcia (minors) were traded by the Mets to the New York Yankees for Darren Reed, Phil Lombardi, and Steve Frey.
- March 26, 1988: Randy Milligan and Scott Henion (minors) were traded by the Mets to the Pittsburgh Pirates for Mackey Sasser and Tim Drummond.

== Regular season ==
- August 9: The Mets participated in the first official night game at Wrigley Field, which the Cubs won, 6–4.

=== Season standings ===
NL East
Team	W	L	Pct.	GB	Home	Road
New York Mets	100	60	.625	—	56‍–‍24	44‍–‍36
Pittsburgh Pirates	85	75	.531	15	43‍–‍38	42‍–‍37
Montreal Expos	81	81	.500	20	43‍–‍38	38‍–‍43
Chicago Cubs	77	85	.475	24	39‍–‍42	38‍–‍43
St. Louis Cardinals	76	86	.469	25	41‍–‍40	35‍–‍46
Philadelphia Phillies	65	96	.404	35½	38‍–‍42	27‍–‍54

=== Record vs. opponents ===
1988 National League record Sources:
Team	ATL	CHC	CIN	HOU	LAD	MON	NYM	PHI	PIT	SD	SF	STL
Atlanta	—	5–7	5–13	5–13	4–14	4–8	4–8	6–6	5–5	8–10	5–13	3–9
Chicago	7–5	—	6–6	7–5	4–8–1	9–9	9–9	8–10	7–11	8–4	5–7	7–11
Cincinnati	13–5	6–6	—	9–9	7–11	5–7	4–7	9–3	7–5	10–8	11–7	6–6
Houston	13–5	5–7	9–9	—	9–9	6–6	5–7	8–4	8–4	6–12	7–11	6–6
Los Angeles	14–4	8–4–1	11–7	9–9	—	8–4	1–10	11–1	6–6	7–11	12–6	7–5
Montreal	8–4	9–9	7–5	6–6	4–8	—	6–12	9–9–1	8–10	4–8	7–5	13–5
New York	8–4	9–9	7–4	7–5	10–1	12–6	—	10–8	12–6	7–5	4–8	14–4
Philadelphia	6-6	10–8	3–9	4–8	1–11	9–9–1	8–10	—	7–11	4–7	7–5	6–12
Pittsburgh	5–5	11–7	5–7	4–8	6–6	10–8	6–12	11–7	—	8–4	8–4	11–7
San Diego	10–8	4–8	8–10	12–6	11–7	8–4	5–7	7–4	4–8	—	8–10	6–6
San Francisco	13–5	7–5	7–11	11–7	6–12	5–7	8–4	5–7	4–8	10–8	—	7–5
St. Louis	9–3	11–7	6–6	6–6	5–7	5–13	4–14	12–6	7–11	6–6	5–7	—

=== Notable transactions ===
- August 4, 1988: Tom McCarthy and Steve Springer were traded by the Mets to the Chicago White Sox for Mike Maksudian and Vince Harris (minors).
- August 22, 1988: Héctor Ramírez was signed as an amateur free agent by the Mets.

== Roster ==
1988 New York Mets
Roster
Pitchers: 15 Rick Aguilera; 44 David Cone; 12 Ron Darling; 50 Sid Fernandez; 16 Dwight Gooden; 40 Jeff Innis; 26 Terry Leach; 27 Bob McClure; 42 Roger McDowell; 43 John Mitchell; 48 Randy Myers; 45 Edwin Núñez; 19 Bob Ojeda; 31 Gene Walter; 46 David West	Catchers: 8 Gary Carter; 33 Barry Lyons; 2 Mackey Sasser; Infielders: 6 Wally Backman; 21 Kevin Elster; 17 Keith Hernandez; 9 Gregg Jefferies; 20 Howard Johnson; 29 Dave Magadan; 25 Keith Miller; 11 Tim Teufel	Outfielders: 32 Mark Carreon; 4 Lenny Dykstra; 13 Lee Mazzilli; 22 Kevin McReynolds; 18 Darryl Strawberry; 1 Mookie Wilson	Manager: 5 Davey Johnson; Coaches: 23 Bud Harrelson; 52 Greg Pavlick; 34 Sam Perlozzo; 28 Bill Robinson; 30 Mel Stottlemyre

== Game log ==
=== Regular season ===
1988 Game Log
Overall: 100–60 (Home: 56–24; Away: 44–36)
April: 15–6 (Home: 6–2; Away: 9–4)

#	Date	Time (ET)	Opponent	Score	Win	Loss	Save	Time of Game	Attendance	Record	Box/ Streak	GB
1	April 4	3:25 pm EDT	@ Expos	**W** 10–6					55,413	1–0	W1	
2	April 6	7:35 pm EDT	@ Expos	L 1–5					11,112	1–1	L1	
3	April 7	7:35 pm EDT	@ Expos	**W** 8–5					10,193	2–1	W1	
4	April 8	7:35 pm EDT	@ Phillies	L 1–5					21,921	2–2	L1	
5	April 9	3:20 pm EDT	@ Phillies	L 3–9					30,994	2–3	L2	
6	April 10	1:35 pm EDT	@ Phillies	**W** 4–3					51,781	3–3	W1	
7	April 12	1:35 pm EDT	Expos	**W** 3–0					48,719	4–3	W2	
8	April 14	1:40 pm EDT	Expos	**W** 1–0					19,612	5–3	W3	
9	April 15	7:35 pm EDT	Cardinals	**W** 3–0 (6)					33,094	6–3	W4	
10	April 16	1:30 pm EDT	Cardinals	**W** 6–4					40,582	7–3	W5	
11	April 17	1:35 pm EDT	Cardinals	**W** 3–2					48,760	8–3	W6	
12	April 18	7:50 pm EDT	Phillies	L 7–10					14,931	8–4	L1	
13	April 19	7:37 pm EDT	Phillies	L 2–10					24,555	8–5	L2	
14	April 20	7:41 pm EDT	Phillies	**W** 6–2					27,714	9–5	W1	
15	April 22	8:35 pm EDT	@ Cardinals	**W** 4–0					47,207	10–5	W2	
16	April 23	8:05 pm EDT	@ Cardinals	**W** 12–9					45,110	11–5	W3	
17	April 24	2:15 pm EDT	@ Cardinals	L 4–5					41,617	11–6	L1	

May: 19–9 (Home: 9–5; Away: 10–4)

#	Date	Time (ET)	Opponent	Score	Win	Loss	Save	Time of Game	Attendance	Record	Box/ Streak	GB

June: 15–13 (Home: 11–4; Away: 4–9)

#	Date	Time (ET)	Opponent	Score	Win	Loss	Save	Time of Game	Attendance	Record	Box/ Streak	GB

July: 14–12 (Home: 9–5; Away: 5–7)

#	Date	Time (ET)	Opponent	Score	Win	Loss	Save	Time of Game	Attendance	Record	Box/ Streak	GB

August: 15–14 (Home: 7–7; Away: 8–7)

#	Date	Time (ET)	Opponent	Score	Win	Loss	Save	Time of Game	Attendance	Record	Box/ Streak	GB

September: 20–6 (Home: 12–1; Away: 8–5)

#	Date	Time (ET)	Opponent	Score	Win	Loss	Save	Time of Game	Attendance	Record	Box/ Streak	GB

October: 2–0 (Home: 2–0; Away: 0–0)

#	Date	Time (ET)	Opponent	Score	Win	Loss	Save	Time of Game	Attendance	Record	Box/ Streak	GB

Legend: = Win = Loss = Postponement
Bold = Mets team member

=== Postseason Game log ===
1988 Postseason game log: 3–4 (Home: 1–2; Away: 2–2)
NL Championship Series: vs. Los Angeles Dodgers 3–4 (Home: 1–2; Away: 2–2)

#	Date	Time (ET)	Opponent	Score	Win	Loss	Save	Time of Game	Location (Attendance)	Series	Box/ Streak
1	October 4	8:28 p.m. EDT	@ Dodgers	3–2				2:45	Dodger Stadium (55,582)	NYN 1–0	W1
2	October 5	10:08 p.m. EDT	@ Dodgers	3–6				3:10	Dodger Stadium (55,780)	TIE 1–1	L1
—	October 7	8:28 p.m. EDT	Dodgers	Postponed (rain); Makeup: October 8							
3	October 8	12:20 p.m. EDT	Dodgers	8–4				3:44	**Shea Stadium** (44,672)	NYN 2–1	W1
4	October 9	8:22 p.m. EDT	Dodgers	4–5 (12)				4:29	**Shea Stadium** (54,014)	TIE 2–2	L1
5	October 10	12 Noon EDT	Dodgers	4–7				3:07	**Shea Stadium** (52,069)	LAN 3–2	L2
6	October 11	8:22 p.m. EDT	@ Dodgers	5–1				3:16	Dodger Stadium (55,885)	TIE 3–3	W1
7	October 12	8:22 p.m. EDT	@ Dodgers	0–6				2:51	Dodger Stadium (55,693)	LAN 4–3	L1

Legend: = Win = Loss = Postponement
Bold = Mets team member

== Player stats ==
=== Batting ===
==== Starters by position ====
Note: Pos = Position; G = Games played; AB = At bats; H = Hits; Avg. = Batting average; HR = Home runs; RBI = Runs batted in

Pos	Player	G	AB	H	Avg.	HR	RBI
C	Gary Carter	130	455	110	.242	11	46
1B	Keith Hernandez	95	348	96	.276	11	55
2B	Wally Backman	99	294	89	.303	0	17
3B	Howard Johnson	148	495	114	.230	24	68
SS	Kevin Elster	149	406	87	.214	9	37
LF	Kevin McReynolds	147	552	159	.288	27	99
CF	Len Dykstra	126	429	116	.270	8	33
RF	Darryl Strawberry	153	543	146	.269	39	101

==== Other batters ====
Note: G = Games played; AB = At bats; H = Hits; Avg. = Batting average; HR = Home runs; RBI = Runs batted in

Player	G	AB	H	Avg.	HR	RBI
Mookie Wilson	112	378	112	.296	8	41
Dave Magadan	112	314	87	.277	1	35
Tim Teufel	90	273	64	.234	4	31
Mackey Sasser	60	123	35	.285	1	17
Lee Mazzilli	68	116	17	.147	0	12
Gregg Jeffries	29	109	35	.321	6	17
Barry Lyons	50	91	21	.231	0	11
Keith Miller	40	70	15	.214	1	5
Mark Carreon	7	9	5	.556	1	1

=== Starting pitchers ===
Note: G = Games pitched; IP = Innings pitched; W = Wins; L = Losses; ERA = Earned run average; SO = Strikeouts

Player	G	IP	W	L	ERA	SO
Dwight Gooden	34	248.1	18	9	3.19	175
Ron Darling	34	240.2	17	9	3.25	161
David Cone	35	231.1	20	3	2.22	213
Bob Ojeda	29	190.1	10	13	2.88	133
Sid Fernandez	31	187.0	12	10	3.03	189

==== Other pitchers ====
Note: G = Games pitched; IP = Innings pitched; W = Wins; L = Losses; ERA = Earned run average; SO = Strikeouts

Player	G	IP	W	L	ERA	SO
Rick Aguilera	11	24.2	0	4	6.93	16
David West	2	6.0	1	0	3.00	3

==== Relief pitchers ====
Note: G = Games pitched; W = Wins; L = Losses; SV = Saves; ERA = Earned run average; SO = Strikeouts

Player	G	W	L	SV	ERA	SO
Randy Myers	55	7	3	26	1.72	69
Roger McDowell	62	5	5	16	2.63	46
Terry Leach	52	7	2	3	2.54	51
Gene Walter	19	0	1	0	3.78	14
Bob McClure	14	1	0	1	4.09	7
Jeff Innis	12	1	1	0	1.89	14
Edwin Núñez	10	1	0	0	4.50	8
John Mitchell	1	0	0	0	0.00	1

== NLCS ==
=== Game 1 ===
October 4: Dodger Stadium, Los Angeles

Team	1	2	3	4	5	6	7	8	9	R	H	E
New York	0	0	0	0	0	0	0	0	3	3	8	1
Los Angeles	1	0	0	0	0	0	1	0	0	2	4	0
WP: Randy Myers (1–0) LP: Jay Howell (0–1)
HR: NYM – None.; LA – None.

=== Game 2 ===
October 5: Dodger Stadium, Los Angeles

Team	1	2	3	4	5	6	7	8	9	R	H	E
New York	0	0	0	2	0	0	0	0	1	3	6	0
Los Angeles	1	4	0	0	1	0	0	0	X	6	7	0
WP: Tim Belcher (1–0) LP: David Cone (0–1) SV: Alejandro Peña (1)
HR: NYM – Keith Hernandez (1); LA – None.

=== Game 3 ===
October 8: Shea Stadium, Flushing, New York

Team	1	2	3	4	5	6	7	8	9	R	H	E
Los Angeles	0	2	1	0	0	0	0	1	0	4	7	2
New York	0	0	1	0	0	2	0	5	X	8	9	2
WP: Randy Myers (2–0) LP: Alejandro Peña (0–1)
HR: LA – None.; NYM – None.

=== Game 4 ===
October 9: Shea Stadium, Flushing, New York

Team	1	2	3	4	5	6	7	8	9	10	11	12	R	H	E
Los Angeles	2	0	0	0	0	0	0	0	2	0	0	1	5	7	1
New York	0	0	0	3	0	1	0	0	0	0	0	0	4	10	2
WP: Alejandro Peña (1–1) LP: Roger McDowell (0–1) SV: Orel Hershiser (1)
HR: LA – Mike Scioscia (1), Kirk Gibson (1); NYM – Darryl Strawberry (1), Kevin McReynolds (1)

=== Game 5 ===
October 10: Shea Stadium, Flushing, New York

Team	1	2	3	4	5	6	7	8	9	R	H	E
Los Angeles	0	0	0	3	3	0	0	0	1	7	12	0
New York	0	0	0	0	3	0	0	1	0	4	9	1
WP: Tim Belcher (2–0) LP: Sid Fernandez (0–1) SV: Brian Holton (1)
HR: LA – Kirk Gibson (2); NYM – Lenny Dykstra (1)

=== Game 6 ===
October 11: Dodger Stadium, Los Angeles

Team	1	2	3	4	5	6	7	8	9	R	H	E
New York	1	0	1	0	2	1	0	0	0	5	11	0
Los Angeles	0	0	0	0	1	0	0	0	0	1	5	2
WP: David Cone (1–1) LP: Tim Leary (0–1)
HR: NYM – Kevin McReynolds (2); LA – None.

=== Game 7 ===
October 12: Dodger Stadium, Los Angeles

Team	1	2	3	4	5	6	7	8	9	R	H	E
New York	0	0	0	0	0	0	0	0	0	0	5	2
Los Angeles	1	5	0	0	0	0	0	0	X	6	10	0
WP: Orel Hershiser (1–0) LP: Ron Darling (0–1)
HR: NYM – None.; LA – None.

== Awards and honors ==
- Keith Hernandez, Gold Glove Award
- Keith Hernandez, Major League record, most Gold Gloves by a first baseman (it was also his 11th consecutive Gold Glove)
- Kevin McReynolds – Player of the Month, September 1988
- Gary Carter – 300 career home runs, and set record for career putouts for a catcher

1988 MLB All-Star Game

- Gary Carter
- David Cone
- Dwight Gooden
- Darryl Strawberry

=== Team leaders ===
- Games – Darryl Strawberry (153)
- At-bats – Kevin McReynolds (552)
- Home runs – Darryl Strawberry (39)
- Runs batted in – Darryl Strawberry (101)
- Batting average – Wally Backman (.303)
- Hits – Kevin McReynolds (159)
- Doubles – Kevin McReynolds (30)
- Triples – Mookie Wilson (5)
- Walks – Howard Johnson (86)
- Stolen bases – Len Dykstra (30)
- Wins – David Cone (20)

== Farm system ==
Level	Team	League	Manager
AAA	Tidewater Tides	International League	Mike Cubbage
AA	Jackson Mets	Texas League	Tucker Ashford
A	St. Lucie Mets	Florida State League	Clint Hurdle
A	Columbia Mets	South Atlantic League	Butch Hobson
A-Short Season	Little Falls Mets	New York–Penn League	Bill Stein
Rookie	Kingsport Mets	Appalachian League	Bobby Floyd
Rookie	GCL Mets	Gulf Coast League	John Tamargo

LEAGUE CHAMPIONS: St. Lucie, Kingsport
