= 1988 National League Championship Series =

20th edition of Major League Baseball's National League Championship Series

Team (Wins)	Managers	Season
Los Angeles Dodgers (4)	Tommy Lasorda	94–67, .584, GA: 7
New York Mets (3)	Davey Johnson	100–60, .625, GA: 15
- Dates: October 4–12
- MVP: Orel Hershiser (Los Angeles)
- Umpires: Harry Wendelstedt (crew chief); John McSherry; Joe West; Dutch Rennert; Bob Davidson; Paul Runge

Broadcast
- Television: ABC
- TV announcers: Al Michaels, Jim Palmer and Tim McCarver
- Radio: CBS
- Radio announcers: Brent Musburger and Jerry Coleman

The 1988 National League Championship Series was a best-of seven playoff series in Major League Baseball’s 1988 postseason played between the National League West champion Los Angeles Dodgers and the National League East champion New York Mets. The Dodgers won the Series four games to three, en route to defeating the Oakland Athletics in five games in the 1988 World Series.

== Background ==
The Dodgers had won their fourth, and what turned out to be their final NL West title of the 1980s, posting a 94–67 record (.580) during the 1988 regular season and beating out the Cincinnati Reds by seven games. The Mets cruised to the best record in the National League in 1988, with a 100–60 record (.625), easily winning the NL East crown by a full 15 games over the Pittsburgh Pirates. The Mets were heavy favorites when the series began; they had beaten the Dodgers ten of 11 times in the regular season, outscoring them, 49–18.

Adding to the backdrop of the series was this being the first Dodgers versus Mets postseason match-up. 31 years ago, the Dodgers and Giants left New York for California. To fulfill New York's city void for National League baseball, the Mets were created in 1962, with their color scheme being based on Dodger blue and Giant orange. The match-up created a generational divide with families, as some older people still rooted for the Dodgers, while the younger generation, born in or thereafter 1957, were mostly Met fans. This was depicted in Season 3, Episode 17 of Everyone Hates Chris, titled "Everyone Hates Ex-Cons".

== Summary ==
=== Los Angeles Dodgers vs. New York Mets ===
Los Angeles won the series, 4–3.

Game	Date	Score	Location	Time	Attendance
1	October 4	New York Mets – 3, Los Angeles Dodgers – 2	Dodger Stadium	2:45	55,582
2	October 5	New York Mets – 3, Los Angeles Dodgers – 6	Dodger Stadium	3:10	55,780
3	October 8	Los Angeles Dodgers – 4, New York Mets – 8	Shea Stadium	3:44	44,672
4	October 9	Los Angeles Dodgers – 5, New York Mets – 4 (12)	Shea Stadium	4:29	54,014
5	October 10	Los Angeles Dodgers – 7, New York Mets – 4	Shea Stadium	3:07	52,069
6	October 11	New York Mets – 5, Los Angeles Dodgers – 1	Dodger Stadium	3:16	55,885
7	October 12	New York Mets – 0, Los Angeles Dodgers – 6	Dodger Stadium	2:51	55,693

== Game summaries ==
=== Game 1 ===
Tuesday, October 4, 1988, at Dodger Stadium in Los Angeles, California

Team	1	2	3	4	5	6	7	8	9	R	H	E
New York	0	0	0	0	0	0	0	0	3	3	8	1
Los Angeles	1	0	0	0	0	0	1	0	0	2	4	0
WP: Randy Myers (1–0) LP: Jay Howell (0–1)

The series opened with a classic pitching matchup, pitting the Dodgers' Orel Hershiser, who had won 23 games during the regular season and carried a Major League record 59 consecutive scoreless innings into the game, against Mets ace Dwight Gooden, who himself had won 18 games during the regular season. A pitchers' duel was expected, and neither pitcher disappointed.

The Dodgers pushed across an early run on a two-out RBI single from Mike Marshall in the first inning, but following that, both teams' offenses were held in check. The Dodgers were held hitless until the seventh inning, where they scored their second run off Gooden on an RBI single from Alfredo Griffin.

With Hershiser rolling, it appeared the Dodgers would knock off the Mets and take the lead in the series. But in the ninth, Mets rookie Gregg Jefferies led off with a single. He advanced to second on a ground out, and the Mets broke through against Hershiser when Darryl Strawberry lined a double into the gap in right-center field to score Jefferies. Strawberry's RBI was the first run allowed by Hershiser in 67 innings, going back to August 30, 1988. Hershiser was then lifted in favor of ace closer Jay Howell. Kevin McReynolds drew a walk, and following a Howard Johnson strikeout, Gary Carter hit a two-strike pitch in front of a diving John Shelby. Strawberry scored as the ball bounced in front of Shelby, and McReynolds followed close behind. Shelby's throw to the plate was a little off target, and McReynolds scored the winning run by bowling over catcher Mike Scioscia as the ball sailed past him.

The Dodgers went down in order in the last of the ninth, and the Mets came away with a comeback win to draw first blood in the series.

=== Game 2 ===
Wednesday, October 5, 1988, at Dodger Stadium in Los Angeles, California

Team	1	2	3	4	5	6	7	8	9	R	H	E
New York	0	0	0	2	0	0	0	0	1	3	6	0
Los Angeles	1	4	0	0	1	0	0	0	X	6	7	0
WP: Tim Belcher (1–0) LP: David Cone (0–1) Sv: Alejandro Peña (1); Home runs: NYM: Keith Hernandez (1); LAD: None

"We saw Howell throwing curveball after curveball and we were thinking: This is the Dodgers' idea of a stopper? Our idea is Randy (Myers), a guy who can blow you away with his heat. Seeing Howell and his curveball reminded us of a high school pitcher."

David Cone, the Mets' starting pitcher for Game 2, wrote the above in an article for the New York Daily News. The article appeared in the paper the morning of Game 2, and the Dodgers were not pleased upon reading it. They took out their anger on the field that night—against Cone.

Mike Marshall drove in a first-inning run for the second night in a row. But in the second, the Dodgers exploded for four more runs to take a 5–0 lead and knock Cone from the game. Mickey Hatcher struck the key blow with a two-run double.

Although the Mets would draw within three runs on a fourth-inning two-run home run from Keith Hernandez, they could not overcome the Dodgers' pitching. Dodgers starting pitcher Tim Belcher struck out ten over 8 1/3 innings, and the Dodgers tied the series with a 6–3 victory.

=== Game 3 ===
Saturday, October 8, 1988, at Shea Stadium in Queens, New York

Team	1	2	3	4	5	6	7	8	9	R	H	E
Los Angeles	0	2	1	0	0	0	0	1	0	4	7	2
New York	0	0	1	0	0	2	0	5	X	8	9	2
WP: Randy Myers (2–0) LP: Alejandro Peña (0–1)

Fantastic plays and controversy would mark the afternoon, as the Mets rebounded from deficits twice to earn an 8–4 victory in Game 3.

Following a rainout, Game 3 was played in horrible football-esque weather. The rain that had delayed the game a day turned the field into a muddy mess.

The rainout of the previous night allowed the Dodgers to bring back Orel Hershiser to start on three days' rest, while the Mets countered with Ron Darling, who got off to a rocky start. The Dodgers scored their first run in the second inning on a throwing error by Keith Hernandez on a bunt attempt by Mike Scioscia. The Dodgers got another run on an RBI ground out by Jeff Hamilton, and a third run in the third inning on an RBI ground out by Kirk Gibson.

But the Mets would not lie down against Hershiser. Darryl Strawberry drove home Mookie Wilson with a double in the bottom of the third inning, and in the sixth inning, the Mets tied the game thanks to some clutch hitting and sloppy Dodgers fielding.

With Hernandez on first and none out, Strawberry singled to left. When Gibson bobbled the ball in the outfield, Hernandez tried to go to third. However, Hernandez slipped twice on the muddy infield, and Gibson was able to recover and throw Hernandez out as he attempted to crawl into third base. Kevin McReynolds reached on an error by third baseman Jeff Hamilton. One out later, back to back singles by Gary Carter and Wally Backman scored the two tying runs, and the Mets had come back once again against Hershiser. But the game was far from over.

With two outs and the bases empty in the top of the eighth inning, Scioscia hit a one-hop comebacker back to Mets pitcher Roger McDowell. McDowell lined up to make a throw, and slipped to the ground on the wet mound. His throw to first was wild, and Scioscia advanced to second base on the error. Following a single, a walk and a pitching change, Randy Myers walked Mike Sharperson to force home a run and give the Dodgers a 4–3 lead.

The Dodgers turned to closer Jay Howell in the bottom of the eighth. Howell ran a three ball, two strike count to McReynolds leading off the inning. Suddenly, Mets Manager Davey Johnson came out of the dugout, and asked Umpire Harry Wendelstedt to inspect Howell's glove for an illegal substance. Sure enough, Howell was found to have pine tar on his glove, and he was immediately ejected from the game, and would later be suspended for Games 4, 5, and 6. The ejection seemed to undo the Dodgers. Three subsequent relievers failed to hold down the Mets, as they rallied for five runs in the inning after two men were out. Backman doubled home the tying run, Wilson singled home Backman with the lead run and Darryl Strawberry iced the inning with a two-run single.

David Cone would shake off his rocky outing from Game 2, and pitched a scoreless ninth inning to close out the Dodgers and give the Mets a two to one Series lead.

=== Game 4 ===
Sunday, October 9, 1988, at Shea Stadium in Queens, New York

Team	1	2	3	4	5	6	7	8	9	10	11	12	R	H	E
Los Angeles	2	0	0	0	0	0	0	0	2	0	0	1	5	7	1
New York	0	0	0	3	0	1	0	0	0	0	0	0	4	10	2
WP: Alejandro Peña (1–1) LP: Roger McDowell (0–1) Sv: Orel Hershiser (1); Home runs: LAD: Mike Scioscia (1), Kirk Gibson (1); NYM: Darryl Strawberry (1), Kevin McReynolds (1)

It was the Dodgers who did the coming back in Game 4, and they did so in a way against the Mets ace.

Dwight Gooden started for the Mets, and the Dodgers scored early, just as they had in Game 1. A two-run single from John Shelby with two outs would give the Dodgers the lead. But once again, the Mets rebounded from the early deficit, this time against Dodgers starter John Tudor.

With no outs and Keith Hernandez on first base in the fourth inning, Darryl Strawberry launched a long home run to right off Tudor to tie the score. One batter later, Kevin McReynolds hit a home run, over the bleachers in left field to put the Mets ahead. The Mets expanded their lead on an RBI triple from Gary Carter in the sixth inning.

With a 4–2 lead going into the ninth inning, and Gooden cruising, the Mets looked to be a lock to take a commanding three games to one lead in the series. Since the first inning, Gooden had allowed one hit, and only four baserunners. But uncharacteristically, Gooden walked John Shelby to lead off the ninth, after having a two-strike count. Catcher Mike Scioscia then drilled a two-run home run into the Mets bullpen in right field to tie the game.

The game continued tied into the 12th inning, when Kirk Gibson, mired in a 1-for-16 slump in the series, hit a two-out home run off Roger McDowell to give the Dodgers the lead.

With two runners on base and one out in the bottom half of the twelfth inning, the leftie Jesse Orosco came in to pitch to Hernandez and Strawberry, both left-handed hitters. Orosco worked to a 1–2 count on Hernandez, then threw three straight balls to walk the bases loaded. After Orosco threw another ball on his first pitch to Strawberry, Lasorda went out to the mound to deliver a message, which started with "What the fuck is wrong with you?" Orosco eventually got Strawberry to pop out to the infield. With the right-handed hitter McReynolds coming up, Lasorda summoned Orel Hershiser, even though he had pitched seven innings the previous day. With Jay Howell having been suspended and Tim Belcher, the starter for the next game, resting in his hotel room, Hershiser was the only pitcher left in the bullpen for the Dodgers. On his third pitch, he got McReynolds to fly out to shallow center, Shelby racing in for the game-ending catch. Hershiser got the save, and the Dodger win tied the series at two games apiece. The next game was scheduled to start in less than 11 hours.

=== Game 5 ===
Monday, October 10, 1988, at Shea Stadium in Queens, New York

Team	1	2	3	4	5	6	7	8	9	R	H	E
Los Angeles	0	0	0	3	3	0	0	0	1	7	12	0
New York	0	0	0	0	3	0	0	1	0	4	9	1
WP: Tim Belcher (2–0) LP: Sid Fernandez (0–1) Sv: Brian Holton (1); Home runs: LAD: Kirk Gibson (2); NYM: Lenny Dykstra (1)

After a late-night affair in which the Dodgers were within three outs of going behind three games to one (and having used all available pitchers to survive extra innings), Los Angeles defeated the Mets 7–4 in the quick-turnaround, early afternoon matchup.

The Dodgers jumped on Mets starting pitcher Sid Fernandez in the fourth and fifth innings to run out to a 6–0 lead. In the fourth, Fernandez allowed a one-out single to Mike Marshall and a walk to John Shelby before catcher Rick Dempsey, making his first start of the series, doubled them both in. Two batters later, Alfredo Griffin drove Dempsey in with another double. The next inning, Kirk Gibson crushed a three-run homer to right, bringing in Steve Sax and Mickey Hatcher who singled in front of him, and chasing Fernandez from the game.

The Mets responded in their half of the fifth. After Tim Belcher had escaped a two-on with no-outs jam in the previous inning, he allowed a one-out bloop single to the struggling Howard Johnson, then a drag bunt single to Wally Backman, but looked as if he might escape again after striking out pinch hitter Dave Magadan. This time though, Len Dykstra hit a two-out three-run homer to halve the deficit.

After a couple more scoreless frames from both sides, Dykstra led off the bottom of the 8th with a double, and Gregg Jeffries followed by singling him home to make the score 6–4 and finally chasing Belcher to get into the Dodgers' depleted bullpen. Ricky Horton entered and struck out Keith Hernandez but allowed a soft line-drive single to Darryl Strawberry. With runners at first and second and one out, Brian Holton entered for the Dodgers to face Kevin McReynolds, who hit a very slow grounder to the left side. As shortstop Alfredo Griffin charged in to attempt a play on the ball, the runner Jeffries kicked the ball as he attempted to leap over it, making him automatically out. Had the rookie Jeffries successfully evaded the batted ball, it would have been very unlikely that Griffin would have been able to record either a force out at third or at first due to the very slow pace at which it was hit. On the TV broadcast, analyst Tim McCarver remarked that "the only play for the Dodgers worked: the ball hit Gregg Jeffries...that's the only thing that could get an out in that situation." Instead of having bases loaded with one out and a two run deficit, the Mets now had runners on first and second with two outs, and after the fortunate break for the Dodgers, Holton got Gary Carter to fly out and end the threat.

In the top of the ninth, Gibson beat out a slow ground ball to the first baseman. On the first pitch of the next at bat, he took off for second but injured himself sliding into the bag and immediately asked to be taken out of the game for a pinch runner. Unbeknownst to Gibson, the ball had gotten away from the catcher and a slide was not necessary; instead, Gibson – who was already battling a left hamstring injury – tore his right meniscus and was severely hampered for the rest of the playoffs. Marshall knocked in pinch runner Jose Gonzalez with his third hit of the game, and Holton retired the Mets in order to complete his five-out save, though Orel Hershiser again warmed up in the bullpen in case Holton faltered. Belcher won his second game of the series.

=== Game 6 ===
Tuesday, October 11, 1988, at Dodger Stadium in Los Angeles, California

Team	1	2	3	4	5	6	7	8	9	R	H	E
New York	1	0	1	0	2	1	0	0	0	5	11	0
Los Angeles	0	0	0	0	1	0	0	0	0	1	5	2
WP: David Cone (1–1) LP: Tim Leary (0–1); Home runs: NYM: Kevin McReynolds (2); LAD: None

Pitching in the face of adversity, and pitching to keep his team's season alive, David Cone rebounded from his poor outing in Game 2 to post a sterling complete game victory in Game 6.

For the only time in the entire series, the Mets scored first as a sacrifice fly by Kevin McReynolds scored Lenny Dykstra in the first inning to put the Mets ahead. McReynolds later hit a two-run home run in the fifth inning to put the game out of reach.

Cone scattered five hits and allowed one run in his effort, which knotted the series once again, forcing a decisive Game 7.

Jay Howell was available to pitch for the Dodgers because the National League president Bart Giamatti had cut a game off his suspension following an appeal hearing.

=== Game 7 ===
Wednesday, October 12, 1988, at Dodger Stadium in Los Angeles, California

Team	1	2	3	4	5	6	7	8	9	R	H	E
New York	0	0	0	0	0	0	0	0	0	0	5	2
Los Angeles	1	5	0	0	0	0	0	0	X	6	10	0
WP: Orel Hershiser (1–0) LP: Ron Darling (0–1)

Before the game, Mets manager Davey Johnson remarked that the excessive use of Orel Hershiser might undo the Dodgers. Hershiser had pitched eight-plus innings in Game 1, seven in Game 3, and earned a save in Game 4. Missing from his log was a victory, but Hershiser got it with a complete-game shutout to pitch the Dodgers into the World Series for the first time since 1981. Hershiser's performance earned him Most Valuable Player honors.

The Dodgers capitalized on two Mets errors in the second inning to put the game out of reach early. Steve Sax hit a two-run single to knock out Mets starter Ron Darling, and a Wally Backman error led to two more runs in a five-run Dodgers rally. With Darling out of the game, Dwight Gooden entered the game to pitch 3 innings of scoreless relief.

With Hershiser on the mound, and a big lead, the game was all but over. Hershiser allowed only five hits over his complete game effort, and his strikeout of Howard Johnson ended the game and capped off a memorable series.

This was the first postseason Game 7 to be played at Dodger Stadium; the next one would come 29 years later in the 2017 World Series, where the Dodgers would lose against the Houston Astros 5–1, clinching the Astros' first World Series championship.

== Composite box ==
1988 NLCS (4–3): Los Angeles Dodgers over New York Mets

Team	1	2	3	4	5	6	7	8	9	10	11	12	R	H	E
Los Angeles Dodgers	5	11	1	3	5	0	1	1	3	0	0	1	31	52	5
New York Mets	1	0	2	5	5	4	0	6	4	0	0	0	27	58	8
Total attendance: 373,695 Average attendance: 53,385

== Aftermath ==
=== Dodgers ===
The 1988 Dodgers were also heavy underdogs against mighty Oakland Athletics in the 1988 World Series, but won the championship in five games, highlighted by Kirk Gibson's walk-off home run in Game 1. Davey Johnson's warning that excessive use of Orel Hershiser would undo the Dodgers would not come true, as Hershiser capped off his magical season by winning the World Series MVP, to go along with an NLCS MVP, Cy Young Award and passing Don Drysdale's consecutive scoreless inning record. Hershiser is the last player to have won a World Series MVP plus two other major awards in the same year.

With their World Series win, the Dodgers were the only team to win two World Series in the 1980s, with their first in the decade coming in 1981. Following the conclusion of the 1988 World Series, the Dodgers would not win another playoff series until 2008, would not win another pennant until 2017, and would not win the World Series again until 2020.

The Dodgers bested the Mets 4 games to 2 in the 2024 NLCS, en route to the franchise's eighth World Series victory.

=== Mets ===
1988 proved to be the Mets best and last chance to win another World Series with the 1986 core. The 1989 season got off to a rough start when Darryl Strawberry threw a punch at Keith Hernandez during team picture day in March. The two shouted at each other and were restrained by teammates until Strawberry left the area. During the 1989 season, Lenny Dykstra and Roger McDowell were traded to the Philadelphia Phillies for Juan Samuel, which proved to be a mistake in hindsight as Dykstra became an All-Star-caliber player in Philadelphia, even finishing as the MVP runner-up on the 1993 pennant-winning Phillies. Another ill-fated trade was when Kevin Mitchell was traded to the San Diego Padres after the 1986 season, where he played half a season before landing in San Francisco. With the Giants, Mitchell would reach his full potential by winning the 1989 National League MVP. The Mets finished a respectable 87–75 in 1989, but 6 games behind the Cubs in the NL East and far off their 100-win pace that they set 1986 and 1988.

The Mets chose not to re-sign Keith Hernandez after his contract ran out at the close of the 1989 season, while Gary Carter was released after five seasons with the club. The following year, Davey Johnson was fired after a 20–22 start to the season (he would later manage the Dodgers in 1999 and 2000). The 1990 Mets rebounded later in the season and even came within a half a game of leading the NL East in mid-September, but they would ultimately not reach the postseason. Bob Ojeda, Strawberry, and Gary Carter, whom were all from the Los Angeles area, would wind up on the Dodgers in 1991. At the 1991 trade deadline, Ron Darling was traded to the Montreal Expos. After a fifth-place finish in 1991, Frank Cashen, the architect of the 1986 championship team, stepped down as the Mets' general manager.

Dwight Gooden, one of the last holdovers from the 1986 core, would decline rapidly in the early 1990s due to heavy workload and drug use. During the strike-shortened 1994 season at age 29, Gooden had a 3–4 record with a 6.31 ERA when he tested positive for cocaine use and was suspended for 60 days. He tested positive again while serving the suspension and was further suspended for the entire 1995 season. The day after receiving the second suspension, Gooden's wife, Monica, found him in his bedroom with a loaded gun to his head. George Steinbrenner would take a chance on Gooden the following season and he would help win a World Series for the 1996 Yankees, alongside his 1988 Mets' teammates David Cone and Darryl Strawberry. Gooden would also throw a no-hitter against the Seattle Mariners on May 14, 1996.

The Mets did not play another postseason game until the 1999 National League Division Series.

The Mets are 2-1 versus the Dodgers in postseason since 1988, winning the 2006 NLDS and 2015 NLDS, but losing the NLCS to Los Angeles in 2024. To date, the Mets have not won a World Series since 1986.

John Harper, a longtime New York baseball columnist, called Mike Scioscia's home run off of Dwight Gooden in the 9th inning of Game 4, the most devastating moment in Mets history.
