= William Brennan (baseball) =

American baseball player (born 1963)

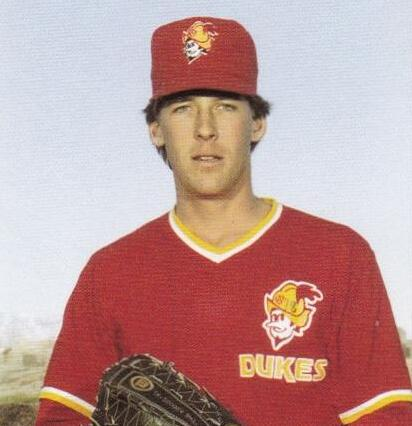
- Brennan with the Albuquerque Dukes c. 1987
- Pitcher
- Born: January 15, 1963 (age 62); Tampa, Florida, U.S.
- Batted: Right Threw: Right

MLB debut
- July 19, 1988, for the Los Angeles Dodgers

Last MLB appearance
- October 2, 1993, for the Chicago Cubs

MLB statistics
- Win–loss record: 2–2
- Earned run average: 5.18
- Strikeouts: 18
- Stats at Baseball Reference

Teams
- Los Angeles Dodgers (1988); Chicago Cubs (1993)

William Raymond Brennan (born January 15, 1963) is an American former professional baseball pitcher. He played in Major League Baseball (MLB) for the Los Angeles Dodgers and Chicago Cubs. Brennan spent his high school years in Nashville, Tennessee and played for Bellevue and Hillwood High Schools.

== Career ==
Brennan attended Mercer University and was signed as an undrafted free agent by the Los Angeles Dodgers on September 1, 1984. He played for the Vero Beach Dodgers (1985), San Antonio Dodgers (1986) and Albuquerque Dukes (1987–1988) before making his major league debut with the Dodgers on July 19, 1988, as a starting pitcher against the St. Louis Cardinals. Brennan worked 4 2/3 innings, gave up three runs and took the loss. He appeared in four games for the Dodgers during their championship year of 1988, making two starts.

Brennan was back with the Dukes for 1989 and then moved around, playing for the Tucson Toros (Houston Astros), Harrisburg Senators (Montreal Expos), Toledo Mud Hens (Detroit Tigers) and Iowa Cubs, before getting another chance in the bigs with the Chicago Cubs in 1993. He pitched in eight games, making one start in '93.

After one more season with Iowa, he was out of baseball after the 1994 season.
