= Brian Holton =

American baseball player (born 1959)

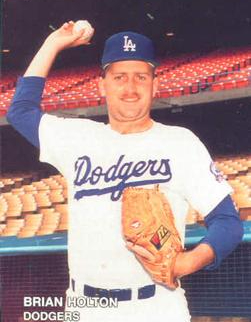
- Holton with the Los Angeles Dodgers c. 1987
- Pitcher
- Born: November 29, 1959 (age 66); McKeesport, Pennsylvania, U.S.
- Batted: Right Threw: Right

MLB debut
- September 9, 1985, for the Los Angeles Dodgers

Last MLB appearance
- July 30, 1990, for the Baltimore Orioles

MLB statistics
- Win–loss record: 20–19
- Earned run average: 3.62
- Strikeouts: 210
- Stats at Baseball Reference

Teams
- Los Angeles Dodgers (1985–1988); Baltimore Orioles (1989–1990)

Career highlights and awards
- World Series champion (1988)

Brian John Holton (born November 29, 1959) is an American former professional baseball player who pitched in Major League Baseball, primarily in relief, from 1985 to 1990.

== Biography ==
Holton was a member of the Los Angeles Dodgers team that won the 1988 World Series. He earned a save in game 5 of the 1988 National League Championship Series against the New York Mets. He had a 7–3 record with a 1.70 earned run average (ERA) in 45 games during the 1988 regular season.

Holton, Ken Howell and Juan Bell were traded to the Baltimore Orioles in exchange for Eddie Murray on December 4, 1988.

Holton's performance declined in his two years in Baltimore, after which he returned to the Dodgers farm system for two years. After baseball, he descended into substance abuse and poverty. He became addicted to alcohol and painkillers, got divorced, worked a series of odd jobs, pawned his World Series ring, defaulted on child support payments, was jailed as a result and spent some time in homeless shelters.
