= Tim Leary =

American baseball player (born 1958)

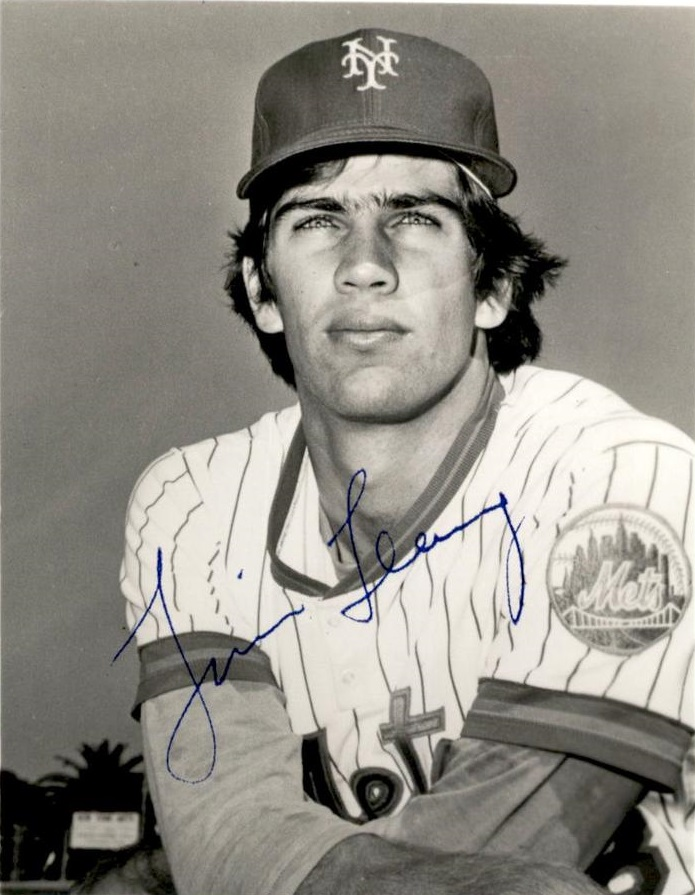
- Pitcher
- Born: December 23, 1958 (age 67); Santa Monica, California, U.S.
- Batted: Right Threw: Right

MLB debut
- April 12, 1981, for the New York Mets

Last MLB appearance
- August 9, 1994, for the Texas Rangers

MLB statistics
- Win–loss record: 78–105
- Earned run average: 4.36
- Strikeouts: 888
- Stats at Baseball Reference

Teams
- New York Mets (1981, 1983–1984); Milwaukee Brewers (1985–1986); Los Angeles Dodgers (1987–1989); Cincinnati Reds (1989); New York Yankees (1990–1992); Seattle Mariners (1992–1993); Texas Rangers (1994)

Career highlights and awards
- World Series champion (1988); Silver Slugger Award (1988)
Medals
Men's baseball
Representing United States
Amateur World Series
Silver medal – second place	1978 Italy	Team

Timothy James Leary (born December 23, 1958) is an American former professional baseball right-handed pitcher.

== Amateur career ==
Leary posted a 10–2 record in his senior year at Santa Monica High School, and was named to the 1976 All-California Interscholastic Federation first-team. He went 19–1 to lead his American Legion Baseball team to the national championship. Much more in stature than his teammate and fellow former major leaguer, Rod Allen, he received the opportunity to play college baseball at UCLA.

Leary attended the University of California, Los Angeles (UCLA), where he was a three-year letterwinner for the UCLA Bruins baseball team while completing an economics degree. Over his college career, Leary compiled a 21–15 record with a 3.09 earned run average. His sixteen complete games is a school record, and his 258 strikeouts are the school's fourth highest total.

In 1978, Leary helped lead the United States national baseball team to the silver medal in the World Cup played in Italy. He was also a member of the national team for the 1979 Pan American Games.

== Professional career ==
=== New York Mets ===
Leary was selected by the New York Mets as the second overall pick of the 1979 Major League Baseball draft. He went 15–8 with a 2.76 ERA and 138 strikeouts for the Jackson Mets in his first professional season, prompting the Mets to make the controversial decision to bring him all the way to the majors for his second season. Making his major league debut on April 12, 1981, Leary faced just seven batters, before leaving the game after just two innings with a strained elbow. After four months inactive, he appeared in six games with the Mets' triple A affiliate, the Tidewater Tides toward the end of the 1981 season. He strained his elbow a second time during Spring training 1982, and was shut down for the entire 1982 season.

He returned to Tidewater in 1983, and fell to 8–16 with a 4.38 ERA, mostly due to an increase in home runs allowed (11 versus just 5 in 1980). Regardless, he received a second call up to the majors that September, and never made it out of the second inning in his return, mostly due to two errors by George Foster in left field that led to five unearned runs. His second start, however, went far better, as he pitched a complete game for his first major league victory against the Montreal Expos.

Leary split the 1984 season between Tidewater and the Mets.

=== Milwaukee Brewers ===
During the 1984–85 offseason, Leary was part of a four team trade in which the Mets sent him to the Milwaukee Brewers and received Frank Wills from the Kansas City Royals.

Leary spent the 1985 season with Milwaukee's triple A affiliate, the Vancouver Canadians, and once again returned to the majors when rosters expanded that September. He finally enjoyed his first healthy major league season in 1986 when he went 12–12 with a 4.21 ERA and 188.1 innings pitched. Following the season, he and Tim Crews were traded to the Los Angeles Dodgers for Greg Brock.

=== Los Angeles Dodgers ===
Leary went 3–11 with a 4.76 ERA splitting his time between starts and as a reliever in 1987. After the season, Leary pitched in the Mexican Leagues so he could learn how to throw a split-finger pitch. He had to drive from Santa Monica to Tijuana nearly on a daily basis to play. This led to a breakthrough season for the Dodgers in 1988. He held the Philadelphia Phillies to just one hit on May 25, and was named the National League's "Pitcher of the Week" for the week of July 18–24, during which he shut out the St. Louis Cardinals and earned a complete game victory over the Pittsburgh Pirates. He finished the season second on his team behind Cy Young Award winner Orel Hershiser in wins (17), ERA (2.91), shutouts (6), complete games (9) and innings pitched (228.2), while leading his club with 180 strikeouts.

The Dodgers won the National League West by seven games over the Cincinnati Reds to face Leary's former franchise, the New York Mets, in the 1988 National League Championship Series. Leary appeared in the game four twelve inning marathon won by the Dodgers, and made the start in game six, taking the loss.

In the World Series against the Oakland Athletics, Leary was used out of the bullpen by manager Tommy Lasorda. His three innings of scoreless work allowed the Dodgers to come back from a 4–2 deficit in game one, and he appeared in game three, allowing one run in 3.2 innings.

Following the Dodgers' World Series victory, Leary was named the Sporting News' National League Comeback Player of the Year for his regular season performance.

=== Cincinnati Reds ===
He was traded to the Cincinnati Reds midway through the 1989 season with Mariano Duncan for Kal Daniels and Lenny Harris. After the season, the Reds sent him and Van Snider to the New York Yankees for Hal Morris and minor leaguer Rodney Imes.

=== New York Yankees ===
Leary experienced some hard luck in his first season with the Yankees. Despite a respectable 4.11 ERA, he led the American League with nineteen losses, mostly due to poor run support from the Yankees' bats and a league-leading 23 wild pitches. Either way, the Yankees re-signed Leary for three years and $5.95 million when he became a free agent at the end of the season. After winning his first two starts of the 1991 season, Leary went 2–8 with a 6.95 ERA to earn a demotion to the bullpen. He ended the season at 4–10 with a 6.49 ERA.

He was moved back into the starting rotation in 1992, and was 5–6 with a 5.57 ERA when he was dealt to the Seattle Mariners for minor leaguer Sean Twitty.

=== Seattle Mariners ===
Seattle acquired Leary to fill a starting rotation that had been decimated by injuries. As a result, Leary made six starts that September.

In 1993, the Mariners improved from a team that narrowly avoided one hundred losses to 82–80, mostly due to new manager Lou Piniella, and the emergence of young stars Randy Johnson, Ken Griffey Jr. and Jay Buhner. For his part, Leary had his first winning season since 1988 at 11–9.

=== Retirement ===
Leary signed a minor-league contract with an invitation to spring training with the Montreal Expos in 1994. He was 2–4 with a 5.43 ERA for the triple-A Ottawa Lynx when they released him. He caught on with the Texas Rangers shortly afterwards, and went 1–1 with an 8.14 ERA. He retired when the Rangers attempted to reassign him to the minor leagues following the season.

In 2011, Leary served as the pitching coach at Cal State Northridge.

As of 2015, Leary is an alumni member of the Los Angeles Dodgers' community relations team.

== Career stats ==
W	L	PCT	ERA	G	GS	CG	SHO	SV	IP	H	ER	R	HR	BB	K	WP	HBP	Fld%	Avg
78	105	.426	4.36	292	224	25	9	1	1491.1	1570	723	792	147	535	888	87	52	.972	.221

Leary was named the NL Silver Slugger pitcher in 1988, when he batted .269 with nine runs batted in and thirteen successful sacrifice bunts. His only career home run came off Hall of Famer Steve Carlton.

== Personal life ==
Leary was inducted into the UCLA Bruins Athletics Hall of Fame while he was a member of the New York Yankees. He was a coach for UCLA from 1997 to 2000 and again in 2004. He has also coached at Loyola Marymount University. He is now the pitching coach for Brentwood School (Los Angeles).
