= Randy Myers =

American baseball player (born 1962)

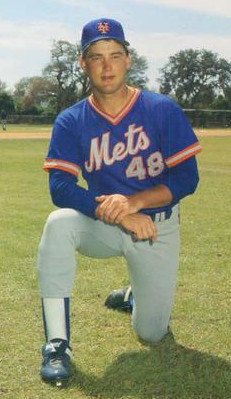
- Myers in 1986
- Pitcher
- Born: September 19, 1962 (age 64); Vancouver, Washington, U.S.
- Batted: Left Threw: Left

MLB debut
- October 6, 1985, for the New York Mets

Last MLB appearance
- September 25, 1998, for the San Diego Padres

MLB statistics
- Win–loss record: 44–63
- Earned run average: 3.19
- Strikeouts: 884
- Saves: 347
- Stats at Baseball Reference

Teams
- New York Mets (1985–1989); Cincinnati Reds (1990–1991); San Diego Padres (1992); Chicago Cubs (1993–1995); Baltimore Orioles (1996–1997); Toronto Blue Jays (1998); San Diego Padres (1998)

Career highlights and awards
- 4× All-Star (1990, 1994, 1995, 1997); World Series champion (1990); NLCS MVP (1990); 2× Rolaids Relief Man Award (1993, 1997); 3× Saves leader (1993, 1995, 1997)

Randall Kirk Myers (born September 19, 1962) is an American former professional baseball pitcher who played in Major League Baseball (MLB) for the New York Mets, Cincinnati Reds, San Diego Padres, Chicago Cubs, Baltimore Orioles, and Toronto Blue Jays, between 1985 and 1998. He batted and threw left-handed.

== Early life ==
Randy Myers grew up in Vancouver, Washington. His father was an auto mechanic and a machinist. He is a graduate of Evergreen High School and Clark College. Myers was drafted in the first round (ninth overall) of the 1982 amateur draft.

== Professional career ==
Myers began his Major League career with the New York Mets in 1985 under the management of Davey Johnson, and was a member of the Mets 1986 World Series-winning team (although he did not appear on the Mets' postseason roster, he was given a World Series ring nine years later, in 1995). Myers became a closer in 1988 as he platooned with Roger McDowell after Jesse Orosco left for the Los Angeles Dodgers.

Myers was traded to the Reds in 1990 for closer John Franco, and became one of the league's elite closers and the most successful member of the Nasty Boys trio, which also included Rob Dibble and Norm Charlton, while being selected as an All-Star in 1990. Myers won his second World Series ring that year as the Reds swept the Oakland Athletics. Later that year, Myers was featured on the 18-ounce box of Wheaties breakfast cereal along with fellow Cincinnati Reds 1990 World Series champions Eric Davis, José Rijo, Barry Larkin, Chris Sabo, and Hal Morris. In 1991, the Reds experimented with Myers as a starter, a move that proved highly unsuccessful as he posted a record of 6 wins and 13 losses.

In 1992, Myers became the closer for the Padres. After only one season in San Diego, Myers was a Cub in 1993 where he posted his best statistical season with a then National League record 53 saves. In a September 28, 1995 game vs. the Astros, Myers was attacked on the field by a fan at Wrigley Field after giving up a two-run, eighth inning home run to James Mouton that put the Astros up 9–7. Fearing that the attacker was armed, Myers used his martial arts training to bring him to the ground, then held him down until security guards could get him. The Cubs rallied to win 12–11 in 10 innings. In 1994 and 1995, Myers earned his second and third All-Star selections. After the 1995 season, Myers became a member of the Orioles where he had two more solid seasons, highlighted by an All-Star selection in 1997, when he saved 45 games. Myers had 28 saves for the Blue Jays in his final season, 1998, before being traded back to the Padres after being claimed on waivers.

The Padres' 1998 acquisition of Myers was seen as a classic case of a team getting stuck with a player as a result of a strategic waiver wire claim. Though they had a solid closer in Trevor Hoffman, the Padres placed a waiver claim on Myers, ensuring that he could not be claimed by the rival Atlanta Braves. The Padres may have expected the Blue Jays to take Myers off waivers, but the Blue Jays were happy to part with Myers and his remaining contract. The minor leaguers traded for Myers were seen as insignificant, suggesting that the two teams agreed to this trade because neither wanted to acknowledge that the Blue Jays were simply letting Myers go. He pitched in 21 games down the stretch for the Padres and made the postseason roster, where he pitched in seven games as the team won the NL pennant; in three innings of work, he had two holds and allowed four runs.

Though he was under contract for both 1999 and 2000, he did not pitch in the Major Leagues after 1998.

In 2000, Myers earned a salary of US$6,916,667.00 while unable to pitch due to a damaged shoulder. Most of his 1999 and 2000 seasons were spent receiving treatment after undergoing rotator cuff surgery in 1999; his injury resulted in a legal dispute between the Padres and their insurance carrier after the carrier denied an $8 million claim due to Myers' inability to play.

In a 14-year Major League career, Myers compiled a 3.19 ERA, 347 saves, 44 wins, 63 losses and struck out 884 batters in 884 2/3 innings.

== Personal life ==
For many years during his pro baseball career he assisted in coaching the women's basketball team at his alma mater, Clark Community College. He is widely involved in charities in Vancouver through his Randy Myers Foundation. He also has a lifelong involvement in martial arts.

Clark College did not field a baseball team after the 1992 season, but by 2011, thanks in large part of Myers' efforts fundraising and spearheading the program's revival, Clark again started playing baseball in 2011.

== See also ==
- List of athletes on Wheaties boxes
- List of Major League Baseball annual saves leaders
- List of Major League Baseball career saves leaders
