= Tim Crews =

American baseball player (1961–1993)

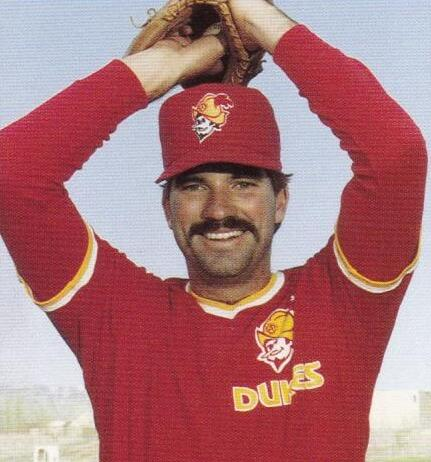
- Crews with the Albuquerque Dukes c. 1987
- Pitcher
- Born: April 3, 1961; Tampa, Florida, U.S.
- Died: March 23, 1993 (aged 31); Little Lake Nellie, Clermont, Florida, U.S.
- Batted: Right Threw: Right

MLB debut
- July 27, 1987, for the Los Angeles Dodgers

Last MLB appearance
- October 3, 1992, for the Los Angeles Dodgers

MLB statistics
- Win–loss record: 11–13
- Earned run average: 3.44
- Strikeouts: 293
- Stats at Baseball Reference

Teams
- Los Angeles Dodgers (1987–1992)

Stanley Timothy Crews (April 3, 1961 – March 23, 1993) was an American Major League Baseball pitcher who played six seasons with the Los Angeles Dodgers from 1987 to 1992. Crews was part of the Dodgers team that won the 1988 World Series. At the end of the 1992 season, he became a free agent and signed with the Cleveland Indians on January 22, 1993.

On March 23, 1993, during spring training, Crews and his Indians teammate Steve Olin were killed in a one-boat accident on Crews' property on Little Lake Nellie in Clermont, Florida. Another teammate, Bob Ojeda, suffered serious head injuries and spent most of the season recovering. An investigation later found that Crews had driven the boat too fast into an unlighted dock and was impaired by a blood alcohol level of 0.14.

Crews and Olin were the first active MLB players to die since Thurman Munson in 1979. In their memory, the Cleveland Indians wore a patch on their jerseys bearing both players' uniform numbers during the 1993 season. The Dodgers, Crews' former team, also wore a patch bearing his uniform number during the 1993 season.

In 281 major league appearances, almost all in relief, Crews compiled a record of 11–13 with a 3.44 earned run average in 423.2 innings. He recorded 15 saves.

== See also ==
- List of baseball players who died during their careers
