= Alejandro Peña =

Dominican baseball player (born 1959)

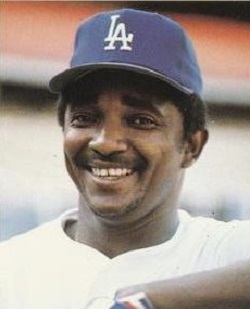
- Pitcher
- Born: June 25, 1959 (age 67); Puerto Plata, Dominican Republic
- Batted: Right Threw: Right

MLB debut
- September 14, 1981, for the Los Angeles Dodgers

Last MLB appearance
- April 13, 1996, for the Florida Marlins

MLB statistics
- Win–loss record: 56–52
- Earned run average: 3.11
- Strikeouts: 839
- Stats at Baseball Reference

Teams
- Los Angeles Dodgers (1981–1989); New York Mets (1990–1991); Atlanta Braves (1991–1992); Pittsburgh Pirates (1994); Boston Red Sox (1995); Florida Marlins (1995); Atlanta Braves (1995); Florida Marlins (1996)

Career highlights and awards
- 3× World Series champion (1981, 1988, 1995); NL ERA leader (1984); Pitched a combined no-hitter on September 11, 1991

Alejandro Peña Vásquez (born June 25, 1959) is a Dominican former relief pitcher in Major League Baseball. Listed at 6' 1" [1.85 m], 200 lb. [91 k], he batted and threw right-handed.

Peña made his Major League debut on August 13, 1981 (in time to be included on the roster for the 1981 National League Championship Series, although he did not appear in the 1981 World Series), and made his last appearance on April 13, 1996, while pitching over his career for the Los Angeles Dodgers (1981–1989), New York Mets (1990–1991), Atlanta Braves (1991–1992; 1995), Pittsburgh Pirates (1994), Boston Red Sox (1995) and Florida Marlins (1995; 1996).

Peña is currently the pitching coach for the Dominican Summer League Dodgers club.

== Los Angeles Dodgers ==
Pena became a full-time starting pitcher in 1983 and 1984, winning the ERA title in 1984 with 2.48 earned run average and leading the league with four shutouts. However, his right shoulder wore down & required surgery in early 1985. Pena was converted to a reliever after that. He served as setup man and part-time closer during his Dodgers tenure.

In the 1988 World Series, Pena pitched the 8th and 9th innings of Game 1, allowing one hit, striking out three, and picking up the win after Kirk Gibson's famous home run. In Game 3, Pena threw three scoreless innings and struck out four.

== Atlanta Braves ==
Peña is best known for his late season success with the Atlanta Braves in 1991. Acquired from the Mets at the end of August (he needed to be on Atlanta's roster on August 31 to pitch in the playoffs), Pena went 13-for-13 in save opportunities, including saving Games 2 and 6 for Steve Avery in the 1991 NLCS. He blew a save in Game 3 of the 1991 World Series, but the Braves later won that game. He was on the mound for the final pitch of that classic series, giving up the base hit to Gene Larkin that won the title for the Minnesota Twins. Peña was the losing pitcher of Game 7. On September 11, 1991, Peña teamed with fellow Braves pitchers Kent Mercker and Mark Wohlers for a combined no-hitter against the San Diego Padres; Peña pitched the final inning of the 1–0 victory for a save. The 13th no-hitter in Braves franchise history, attendance was 20,477 at Fulton-County Stadium in the 1-0 shutout win. In 1992 he was hampered by tendinitis in his pitching elbow, leading the Braves to leave him off their World Series roster and causing him to miss the 1993 season. In 1995 he was reacquired by the Braves for their World Series run and was the winning pitcher of record for the first two games of their NLDS series.

== See also ==
- List of Major League Baseball annual ERA leaders

Preceded by Bret Saberhagen	No-hit game September 11, 1991 (with Kent Mercker & Mark Wohlers)	Succeeded by Kevin Gross
