= Major League Baseball on television in the 1980s =

In 1980, 22 teams (all but the Atlanta Braves, Houston Astros, New York Mets, and St. Louis Cardinals) took part in a one-year cable deal with UA-Columbia. The deal involved the airing of a Thursday night Game of the Week in markets at least 50 miles (80 km) from a major league park. The deal earned Major League Baseball less than $500,000, but led to a new two-year contract for 40-45 games per season.

== Year-by-year breakdown ==
=== 1980 ===
ABC's contract was further modified prior to the 1980 season, with the network airing just five Monday Night Baseball telecasts in June of that year, followed by Sunday Afternoon Baseball in August and September. ABC did Sunday afternoon games late in the season in order to fulfill the number of games in the contract and to not interfere with Monday Night Football.

From 1980 to 1981, Jim Woods and Nelson Briles (replacing Bud Harrelson) broadcast the early games on USA, while Monte Moore and Wes Parker (replacing Maury Wills) called the late game.

Also in 1980, ABC (with Al Michaels and Bob Uecker on the call) broadcast the National League West tie-breaker game between the Houston Astros and Los Angeles Dodgers.

On October 11, 1980, Keith Jackson called an Oklahoma-Texas college football game for ABC in the afternoon, then flew to Houston to call Game 4 of the NLCS). In the meantime, Don Drysdale filled-in for Jackson on play-by-play for the early innings (up until the middle of the fourth inning). Meanwhile, ABC used Steve Zabriskie as a field reporter during the 1980 NLCS.

The 1980 World Series is tied with the 1978 Series for having the highest overall television ratings for a World Series to date, with the six games averaging a Nielsen rating of 32.8 and a share of 56. Although Bryant Gumbel anchored NBC's pregame coverage for Game 5 of the 1980 World Series, he was not present at Royals Stadium in Kansas City. Game 5 was scheduled on a Sunday, which conflicted with Gumbel's hosting duties for the network's NFL pre-game show NFL '80. As a result, Gumbel had to anchor the World Series coverage from the NBC Studios in New York City. Gumbel, however, would be present at Veterans Stadium in Philadelphia for Game 6, which turned out to be the clincher for the Phillies.

=== 1981 ===
In 1981, ABC planned to increase coverage to 10 Monday night games and eight Sunday afternoon games, but the players' strike that year ended up reducing the network's schedule to three Monday night and seven Sunday afternoon telecasts. Also in 1981, as means to recoup revenue lost during a players' strike, Major League Baseball set up a special additional playoff round (as a prelude to the League Championship Series). ABC televised the American League Division Series while NBC televised the National League Division Series. The Division Series round wasn't officially instituted until 14 years later. Games 3 of the Brewers/Yankees series and Royals/Athletics series were aired regionally. On October 10, Keith Jackson called an Oklahoma-Texas college football game for ABC and missed Game 4 of the Milwaukee-New York series. In Jackson's absence, Don Drysdale filled-in for him on play-by-play alongside Howard Cosell. On a trivial note the ABC's affiliates, WTEN in Albany, New York and its satellite WCDC-TV in Adams, Massachusetts, as well as WIXT (now WSYR-TV) in Syracuse, New York, did not carry any of ABC's games at that time because of the New York Yankees games that were simulcasted from New York City's WPIX, movies, and syndicated series and specials among others in order to provide advertising for those extra money.

During the 1981 players' strike, NBC used its Saturday Game of the Week time-slot to show a 20-minute strike update, followed by a sports anthology series hosted by Caitlyn Jenner (then Bruce) (Note: Jenner changed her name due to gender transition in 2015.) called NBC Sports: The Summer Season.

Even though Dick Enberg did play-by-play for the 1981 NLCS for NBC (working alongside Tom Seaver), Merle Harmon was, for the most part, NBC's backup baseball play-by-play announcer (serving behind Joe Garagiola, who called that year's ALCS for NBC with Tony Kubek) in 1981. Harmon's broadcast partner during this period was Ron Luciano. In late 1979, Harmon left the Milwaukee Brewers completely in favor of a multi-year pact with NBC. Harmon saw the NBC deal as a perfect opportunity since according to The Milwaukee Journal he would make more money, get more exposure, and do less traveling. At NBC, Harmon did SportsWorld, the backup Game of the Week, and served as a field reporter for the 1980 World Series. Most of all, Harmon had hoped to cover the American-boycotted 1980 Summer Olympics from Moscow. After NBC pulled out of their scheduled coverage of the 1980 Summer Olympics, Harmon considered it to be "a great letdown." To add insult to injury, NBC fired Harmon in 1982 in favor of Bob Costas.

=== 1982 ===
In 1982, ABC aired 11 Monday night games and one Sunday afternoon game. Game 1 of the 1982 NLCS had to be played twice. In the first attempt (on October 6), the Atlanta Braves led against the St. Louis Cardinals 1–0 behind Phil Niekro. The game was three outs away becoming official when the umpire stopped it. When the rain did not subside, the game was canceled. Game 1 began from the start the following night in a pitching match-up of Pascual Pérez for the Braves and longtime Cardinal starter Bob Forsch. Howard Cosell did not broadcast Game 2 of the 1982 NLCS (alongside Al Michaels and Tommy Lasorda) because of his commitment of hosting the Pittsburgh Steelers' 50th Anniversary dinner in Pittsburgh on October 9, 1982, which was broadcast live on Pittsburgh's ABC affiliate, WTAE-TV and Pittsburgh's NBC affiliate, WPXI-TV. ABC's Jim Lampley interviewed the winners in the Cardinals' clubhouse after clinching the National League pennant in Game 3.

In 1982, USA's doubleheaders did not start until June 17. Prior to the doubleheaders starting, Monte Moore and Wes Parker did the individual game until then. When the doubleheaders finally began, Moore and Parker moved over to the late game for the rest of the year. Meanwhile, Eddie Doucette (replacing Jim Woods) and Nelson Bridles were assigned to call the early game.

USA continued with the plan of not starting doubleheaders until June in the final year of the package in 1983. Steve Zabriskie and Al Albert filled in for Eddie Doucette in September 1982 (Steve Grad also occasionally substituted) while Albert replaced Doucette for a game or more in 1983.

On June 26, 1982, before the bottom of the 9th inning of NBC's Game of the Week between Boston and Milwaukee the power went out at Fenway Park. All television equipment stopped functioning except for one camera and the intercom. Luckily, the director of the telecast was Harry Coyle, who had previously guided 36 World Series broadcasts for NBC. He told the lone cameraman, Mario, “We'll show ’em what one cameraman can do!” and proceeded to direct the final inning of the game with just a single camera and zoom lens, located above home plate — including a frantic near-comeback by the Red Sox, who before the start of the inning, was down 11–8.

According to his autobiography, Oh My, Dick Enberg (then the lead play-by-play voice for The NFL on NBC) was informed by NBC that he would become the lead play-by-play voice of the Major League Baseball Game of the Week beginning with the 1982 World Series (sharing the play-by-play duties for that game with Joe Garagiola, alongside analyst Tony Kubek) and through subsequent regular seasons. Enberg wrote that on his football trips, he would read every edition of The Sporting News to make sure he was current with all the baseball news and notes. He then met with NBC executives in September 1982, who informed him that Vin Scully was in negotiations to be their lead baseball play-by-play announcer (teaming with Garagiola, while Kubek would team with Bob Costas) and would begin with the network in the spring of 1983. Therefore, rather than throw him in randomly for one World Series, Enberg wrote that he hosted the pre-game/post-game shows while the team of Joe Garagiola and Tony Kubek did the games. According to the book, Enberg was not pleased about the decision (since he loved being the California Angels' radio voice in the 1970s and was eager to return to baseball) but the fact that NBC was bringing in Scully, arguably baseball's best announcer, was understandable. Enberg added that NBC also gave him a significant pay increase as a pseudo-apology for not coming through on the promise to make him the lead baseball play-by-play announcer.

Tom Seaver provided periodic commentary during the 1982 World Series, but was not in the booth. As previously mentioned, Dick Enberg and Joe Garagiola traded off play-by-play duties (just as Tony Kubek had done with Garagiola in NBC's previous World Series broadcasts) for NBC's coverage in 1982. Garagiola called the first three and last three innings. Enberg, meanwhile, hosted the pregame show and then called the middle innings.

=== 1983 ===
On April 7, 1983, Major League Baseball, ABC, and NBC agreed to terms of a six-year television package worth $1.2 billion. The two networks continued to alternate coverage of the playoffs (ABC in even numbered years and NBC in odd numbered years), World Series (ABC televised the World Series in odd numbered years and NBC in even numbered years), and All-Star Game (ABC televised the All-Star Game in even numbered years and NBC in odd numbered years) through the 1989 season, with each of the 26 clubs receiving $7 million per year in return. The last package gave each club $1.9 million per year. ABC contributed $575 million for regular season prime time and Sunday afternoons and NBC paid $550 million for thirty Saturday afternoon games. ABC was contracted to televise 20 prime time regular season games a year in addition to other games (the aforementioned Sunday afternoon games). But ABC didn't come close to using that many, which meant they actually paid for games they weren't showing. To give you some perspective, ABC televised six prime time games in 1984 and eight 1985. They planned to again televise eight prime time games in 1986.

USA Network's coverage became a casualty of the new $1.2 billion TV contract between Major League Baseball, ABC and NBC. One of the provisions to the new deal was that local telecasts opposite network games had to be eliminated.

The New York Times observed the performance of the team of Vin Scully and Joe Garagiola by saying "That the duo of Scully and Garagiola is very good, and often even great, is no longer in dispute." A friend of Garagiola's said "he understood the cash" concerning 407% hike in Major League Baseball fees paid by NBC for the 1984–89 contract. At this point the idea was basically summarized as Vin Scully "being the star", whereas Joe Garagiola was Pegasus or NBC's junior light. When NBC inked a six-year, $550 million contract in the fall of 1982, a return on the investment, so to speak, demanded that Vin Scully be their star baseball announcer. Scully reportedly made $2 million a year during his time with NBC in the 1980s. NBC Sports head Thomas Watson said about Scully, "He is baseball's best announcer. Why shouldn't he be ours?" Dick Enberg mused "No room for me. 'Game' had enough for two teams a week." Henry Hecht once wrote "NBC's Curt Gowdy, Tony Kubek, and Monte Moore sounded like college radio rejects vs. Scully." Vin Scully earned approximately $2 million per year for his NBC baseball broadcasting duties. Scully also reworked his Dodgers schedule during this period, as he would broadcast only home games on the radio and road games for television.

Besides calling the Saturday Game of the Week for NBC, Scully called three World Series (1984, 1986, and 1988), four National League Championship Series (1983, 1985, 1987, and 1989), and four All-Star Games (1983, 1985, 1987, and 1989). Scully also reworked his Dodgers schedule during this period, broadcasting home games on the radio, and road games for the Dodgers television network, with Fridays and Saturdays off so he could work for NBC.

Scully was on hand for several key moments in baseball history: Fred Lynn hitting the first grand slam in All-Star Game history (1983); the 1984 Detroit Tigers winning the World Series (along the way, Scully called Tigers pitcher Jack Morris' no-hitter against the Chicago White Sox on April 7); Ozzie Smith's game-winning home run in Game 5 of the 1985 National League Championship Series; the New York Mets' miracle rally in Game 6 of the 1986 World Series; the 1987 All-Star Game in Oakland, which was deadlocked at 0–0 before Tim Raines broke up the scoreless tie with a triple in the top of the 13th inning; the first official night game in the history of Chicago's Wrigley Field (August 9, 1988); Kirk Gibson's game-winning home run in Game 1 of the 1988 World Series; and chatting with former President of the United States Ronald Reagan (who said to Scully, "I've been out of work for six months and maybe there's a future here.") in the booth during the 1989 All-Star Game in Anaheim as Bo Jackson hit a lead off home-run.

When Tony Kubek first teamed with Bob Costas in 1983, Kubek said "I'm not crazy about being assigned to the backup game, but it's no big ego deal." Costas said about working with Kubek "I think my humor loosened Tony, and his knowledge improved me." The team of Costas and Kubek proved to be a formidable pair. There were even some who preferred the team of Kubek and Costas over the musings of Vin Scully and the asides of Joe Garagiola. Costas was praised by fans for both his reverence and irreverence while Kubek was praised for his technical approach and historical perspective.

For the 1983 season, NBC introduced a wraparound studio show (airing for about 15 minutes) co-hosted by Bill Macatee and Mike Adamle called 30 Rock (a reference to the New York City skyscraper that housed NBC's headquarters). The show would offer sports news, highlights and feature reports from Len Berman. It would actually handle breaking news as well. NBC canceled the 30 Rock pregame show after one year. It was also used to wraparound college basketball games, golf, and NBC SportsWorld. 1983 was also the last season that the old blackout restrictions were in place. Thus, Vin Scully's first Game of the Week telecast (Montreal at Los Angeles on April 9) did not air in Los Angeles.

On June 6, 1983, Al Michaels officially succeeded Keith Jackson as the lead play-by-play announcer for Monday Night Baseball. Michaels, who spent seven seasons working backup games, was apparently very miffed over ABC Sports' delay in announcing him as their top baseball announcer. Unlike Jackson, whose forte was college football, Michaels had gigs with the Cincinnati Reds and San Francisco Giants before joining ABC in 1976. TV Guide huffed about Jackson by saying "A football guy, on baseball!" Jackson was unavailable for several World Series games in 1979 and 1981 because of conflicts with his otherwise normal college football broadcasting schedule. Thus, Michaels did play-by-play for games on weekends.

For NBC's coverage of the 1983 All-Star Game in Chicago, Don Sutton was in New York, periodically tracking pitches with the aid of NBC's "Inside Pitch" technology.

1983 marked the last time that local telecasts of League Championship Series games were allowed. In 1982, Major League Baseball recognized a problem with this due to the emergence of cable superstations such as WTBS in Atlanta and WGN-TV in Chicago. When TBS tried to petition for the right to do a "local" Braves broadcast of the 1982 NLCS, Major League Baseball got a Philadelphia federal court to ban them on the grounds that as a cable superstation, TBS could not have a nationwide telecast competing with ABC's.

Earl Weaver was the #1 ABC analyst in 1983, but was also employed by the Baltimore Orioles as a consultant. At the time, ABC had a policy preventing an announcer who was employed by a team from working games involving that team. So whenever the Orioles were on the primary ABC game, Weaver worked the backup game. This policy forced Weaver to resign from the Orioles' consulting position in October in order to be able to work the World Series for ABC.

=== 1984 ===
One of the most memorable broadcasts for the pair of Bob Costas and Tony Kubek was the "Sandberg Game" on June 23, 1984 from Chicago's Wrigley Field. In that particular game, Cubs second baseman Ryne Sandberg hit two crucial, game tying home runs off of St. Louis Cardinals closer Bruce Sutter in both the bottom of the ninth and tenth innings. The Cubs (who were at one point in the game, down 9-3) would ultimately go on to win the game in eleven innings, by the score of 12–11. Bob Costas considered the Game of the Week his dream job saying "You can put a personal stamp on a baseball broadcast, be a reporter, something of a historian, a storyteller, conversationalist, dispenser of opinion."

As champions of the National League, the San Diego Padres had home-field advantage (at the time, the NL automatically gained home-field advantage in even years of the World Series) during the 1984 World Series. However, had the Chicago Cubs won the National League Championship Series (which appeared likely after the Cubs took a 2–0 lead in the best-of-five series), the Detroit Tigers would have gained home-field advantage despite the fact the American League's Baltimore Orioles had it the season before. NBC was contractually obligated to show all mid-week series games in prime time, something that would have been impossible at Wrigley Field, since the Cubs' venerable facility lacked lights at the time (they would not install lights until four years later). Had the Cubs advanced to the Series, Detroit would have hosted Games 1, 2, 6, and 7 (on Tuesday and Wednesday nights), while the Cubs would have hosted Games 3, 4, and 5 (on Friday, Saturday, and Sunday), with all three games in Chicago starting no later than 1:30 p.m. Central Time.

The 1984 NLCS schedule (which had an off day after Game 3 rather than Game 2) allowed ABC to have a prime time game each weeknight even though Chicago's Wrigley Field did not have lights at the time (which remained the case until four years later). ABC used Tim McCarver as a field reporter during the 1984 NLCS. During the regular season, McCarver teamed with Don Drysdale (who teamed with Earl Weaver and Reggie Jackson for the 1984 NLCS) on backup games while Al Michaels, Jim Palmer and Earl Weaver/Howard Cosell formed ABC's number one broadcasting team. For ABC's coverage of the 1984 All-Star Game, Jim Palmer only served as a between innings analyst.

Had the 1984 ALCS between the Detroit Tigers and Kansas City Royals gone the full five games (the last year that the League Championship Series was a best-of-five series), Game 5 on Sunday October 7, would have been a 1 p.m. ET time start instead of being in prime time. This would have happened because one of the presidential debates between Ronald Reagan and Walter Mondale was scheduled for that night. In return, ABC was going to broadcast the debates instead of a baseball game in prime time. Al Trautwig interviewed the Detroit Tigers from their clubhouse following their pennant clinching victory in Game 3.

=== 1985 ===
On Thursday, October 10, 1985, NBC didn't come on the air for Game 2 of the NLCS until 8:30 p.m. ET to avoid disrupting The Cosby Show at 8 (similarly to how the network aired the soap opera Return to Peyton Place, before Game 5 of the 1972 World Series, rather than a pre-game show). NBC would do the same thing for Thursday night games in subsequent postseasons. Dick Enberg hosted the 1985 NLCS pregame shows with Joe Morgan. It was Enberg who broke the news to most of the nation that Vince Coleman had been injured before Game 4. NBC even aired an interview with one of the few people who actually saw the incident, a Dodger batboy.

Dick Enberg was also at Exhibition Stadium in Toronto for Games 1 and 7 of the 1985 ALCS on NBC. Enberg hosted the pregame show alongside Rick Dempsey (who was still active with Baltimore at the time). Meanwhile, Bill Macatee provided a report on Game 2 of the ALCS during the pregame of the NLCS opener.

In 1985, ABC announced that every game of the World Series would be played under the lights for the biggest baseball audience possible. Just prior to the start of the 1985 World Series, ABC removed Howard Cosell from scheduled announcing duties as punishment for his controversial book I Never Played the Game. In Cosell's place came Tim McCarver (joining play-by-play man Michaels and fellow color commentator Jim Palmer), who was beginning his trek of being a part of numerous World Series telecasts. Reportedly, by 1985, Cosell was considered to be difficult to work with on baseball telecasts. Apparently, Cosell and Michaels got into a fairly heated argument following the conclusion of their coverage of the 1984 American League Championship Series due to Cosell's supposed drunkenness among other problems. Rumor has it that Michaels went as far as to urged ABC executives to remove Cosell from the booth. Ultimately, Michaels went public with his problems with Cosell. Michaels claimed that "Howard had become a cruel, evil, vicious person."

=== 1986 ===
By 1986, ABC only televised 13 Monday Night Baseball games. This was a fairly sharp contrast to the 18 games to that were scheduled in 1978. The Sporting News believed that ABC paid Major League Baseball to not make them televise the regular season. TSN added that the network only wanted the sport for October anyway. Going into 1987, ABC had reportedly purchased 20 Monday night games but only used eight of those slots. More to the point, CBS Sports president Neal Pilson said "Three years ago, we believed ABC's package was overpriced by $175 million. We still believe it's overpriced by $175 million."

During the 1986 season, Don Drysdale did play-by-play ABC's Sunday afternoon games, which aired until July, when Monday Night Baseball began. Al Michaels did the main Sunday game usually with Jim Palmer, while Drysdale and Johnny Bench did the backup contests. Keith Jackson, usually working with Tim McCarver did the #2 Monday night games. Bench took a week off in June (with Steve Busby filling in), and also worked one game with Michaels as the networks switched the announcer pairings. While Drysdale worked the All-Star Game in Houston as an interviewer he did not resurface until the playoffs. Bench simply disappeared, ultimately going to CBS Radio.

On October 15, 1986, Game 6 of the NLCS ran so long (lasting for 16 innings, 5 hours and 29 minutes), it bumped up against the start time of Game 7 of the ALCS (also on ABC). During Game 6 of the NLCS, color commentator Tim McCarver left the booth during the bottom of the 16th, in order to cover the expected celebration in the New York Mets' clubhouse. As a result, play-by-play man Keith Jackson was on the air by himself for a short time. Eventually, McCarver rejoined the broadcast just before the end of the game, watching the action on a monitor in the Mets' clubhouse, then doing the postgame interviews with the Mets. Meanwhile, Corey McPherrin, a sports anchor with WABC (ABC's flagship station out of New York) interviewed Mike Scott when he was presented with the 1986 NLCS MVP award after Game 6. During the late 1980s, McPherrin delivered in-game updates during ABC's Monday Night Baseball and Thursday Night Baseball broadcasts. In his last ever ABC assignment, Don Drysdale interviewed the winners in the Boston clubhouse following Game 7 of the 1986 ALCS.

Vin Scully's call of the final play in Game 6 of the 1986 World Series on NBC television would quickly become an iconic one to baseball fans, with the normally calm Scully growing increasingly excited: "So the winning run is at second base, with two outs, three and two to Mookie Wilson. [A] little roller up along first... behind the bag! It gets through Buckner! Here comes Knight, and the Mets win it!" Scully then remained silent for more than three minutes, letting the pictures and the crowd noise tell the story. Scully resumed with "If one picture is worth a thousand words, you have seen about a million words, but more than that, you have seen an absolutely bizarre finish to Game 6 of the 1986 World Series. The Mets are not only alive, they are well; and they will play the Red Sox in Game 7 tomorrow!" Game 6 caused the first preemption of Saturday Night Live, due to extra innings. The preempted episode would air two weeks later on November 8, with an introduction by Ron Darling, who explained that when the Mets entered the locker room, they were informed that they caused the first delay in SNL's 11-year history (at the time) to their dismay.

NBC's broadcast of Game 7 of the 1986 World Series (which went up against a Monday Night Football game between the Washington Redskins and New York Giants on ABC) garnered a Nielsen rating of 38.9 and a 55 share, making it the highest-rated single World Series game to date. Game 7 had been scheduled for Sunday, but a rain-out forced the game to Monday. NBC's telecast of the Series ended with the song "Limelight" from Stereotomy, penultimate album of The Alan Parsons Project.

=== 1987 ===
NBC used Don Sutton as a pre- and post-game analyst for their 1987 LCS coverage. Sutton also made an appearance in the booth during Game 3 of the ALCS. Sutton talked with Bob Costas and Tony Kubek about Twins pitcher Les Straker's borderline balk in that game. Sutton later interviewed Detroit Tigers manager Sparky Anderson following their loss in Game 5. Meanwhile, Marv Albert went back-and-forth during both 1987 LCS. He hosted the pregame for Game 1 of the NLCS with Joe Morgan, and in fact had to read the lineups to the viewing audience. There was a problem with the P.A. feed at Busch Memorial Stadium in St. Louis, so he ended up reading the script from the Cardinal dugout while the players were introduced to the crowd. He then went to Minneapolis the next night to host the ALCS pregame with Don Sutton at the Hubert H. Humphrey Metrodome. Jimmy Cefalo hosted the pregame coverage for Game 5 of the NLCS, as Marv Albert was away on a boxing assignment for NBC.

Jay Randolph, who was also the sports director for St. Louis NBC affiliate KSDK, interviewed the winners in the St. Louis Cardinals' clubhouse following their Game 7 victory. Also following Game 7, NBC's Marv Albert interviewed 1987 NLCS MVP, Jeffrey Leonard of the San Francisco Giants (to date, the last person from the losing team to win a postseason series Most Valuable Player Award, either League Championship Series or World Series).

For the 1987 World Series between the Minnesota Twins and St. Louis Cardinals, ABC utilized 12 cameras and nine tape machines. This includes cameras positioned down the left field line, on the roof of the Metrodome, and high above third base. There have been a few occasions when two Monday Night Football games were played simultaneously. In 1987, a scheduling conflict arose when Major League Baseball's Minnesota Twins went to Game 7 of the World Series (which also aired on ABC), making the Hubert H. Humphrey Metrodome unavailable for the Minnesota Vikings' scheduled game (against the Denver Broncos) that Sunday.

Although Al Michaels, Jim Palmer and Tim McCarver had done the 1985 and 1987 World Series together as well as the 1986 All-Star Game, ABC did not team them on a regular basis on Monday Night Baseball until 1988 (after three 'experiments' in 1987).

=== 1988 ===
During the 1988 Writers Guild of America strike, networks benefited from sports programming, including NBC, which relied on the Summer Olympics in September and the World Series in October, and ABC, which in addition to its postseason baseball coverage, moved up the start time for the early weeks of Monday Night Football (when Al Michaels was unavailable to do play-by-play on Monday Night Football, which he had done for ABC beginning in 1986 due to his postseason baseball duties, Frank Gifford covered for him) from 9 p.m. ET to 8 p.m. ET (MacGyver, which normally aired at 8 p.m., was not yet ready with new episodes).

ABC's coverage of Game 2 of the 1988 NLCS didn't start until 10 p.m. ET due to a presidential debate. This is the latest ever scheduled start for an LCS game.

Gary Bender did play-by-play for the 1988 American League Championship Series between the Oakland Athletics and Boston Red Sox. Bender spent two years (1987-1988) as the #2 baseball play-by-play man for ABC behind Al Michaels. Bender worked the backup Monday Night Baseball broadcasts (with Tim McCarver in 1987 and Joe Morgan in 1988) as well as serving as a field reporter for ABC's 1987 World Series coverage. After Bender spent an entire summer developing a team with Joe Morgan, ABC brought in Reggie Jackson to work with the duo for the 1988 ALCS. According to Bender's autobiography Call of the Game (pages 118-120), ABC's decision to bring in Jackson to work with Bender and Morgan caused problems:

Reggie is one of the strongest personalities I've ever met. He epitomizes the big-name athlete who has become a great player, in part because of his ego, but who does not have the sensitivity to let go of that ego when working with others. Consequently, Reggie demanded things he hadn't earned the right to demand. He wanted more attention. He insisted we adjust our way of doing things for him.

During the spare time of his active career, Reggie Jackson worked as a field reporter and color commentator for ABC Sports. During the 1980s (1983, 1985, and 1987 respectively), Jackson was given the task of presiding over the World Series Trophy presentations.

As previously mentioned, longtime Los Angeles Dodgers' broadcaster Vin Scully called the 1988 World Series for a national television audience on NBC with Joe Garagiola. Unknown to the fans and the media at the time, Kirk Gibson was watching the game on television while undergoing physical therapy in the Dodgers' clubhouse. At some point during the game, television cameras scanned the Dodgers dugout and Scully, observed that Gibson was nowhere to be found. This spurred Gibson to tell Dodgers manager Tommy Lasorda that he was available to pinch hit. Gibson immediately returned to the batting cage in the clubhouse to take practice swings. Bob Costas, who, along with Marv Albert, hosted NBC's World Series pre-game coverage and handled post-game interviews, made on-air statements that enraged many in the Dodgers' clubhouse (especially Tommy Lasorda). After the Dodgers won Game 4, Lasorda (during a post-game interview with Marv Albert) sarcastically said that the MVP of the World Series should be Bob Costas. While Kirk Gibson was taking practice swings in the Dodgers' clubhouse during Game 1, Orel Hershiser set up the hitting tee for his teammate. Along the way, Costas could hear Gibson's agonized-sounding grunts after every hit. Costas said that the 1988 Dodgers possibly had the weakest hitting line-up in World Series history.

The following is Vin Scully's call of Kirk Gibson's game inning home run in Game 1 of the 1988 World Series of the 1988 World Series: "All year long, they looked to him to light the fire, [Scully began] and all year long, he answered the demands, until he was physically unable to start tonight – with two bad legs: The bad left hamstring, and the swollen right knee. And, with two out, you talk about a roll of the dice... this is it." Scully made repeated references to Gibson's legs, noting at one point that the batter was "shaking his left leg, making it quiver, like a horse trying to get rid of a troublesome fly." Gibson worked the count to 3–2 as Mike Davis stole second base; the camera turned at that point to Steve Sax getting ready for his turn at the plate, and Scully reminded the viewers that Sax was waiting on deck, but that the game right now is at the plate. "High fly ball into right field, she i-i-i-is... gone!!" Scully said nothing for over a minute, allowing the pictures to tell the story. Finally, he said, "In a year that has been so improbable... the impossible has happened!" Returning to the subject of Gibson's banged-up legs during a replay, Scully joked, "And, now, the only question was, could he make it around the base paths unassisted?!" "You know, I said it once before, a few days ago, that Kirk Gibson was not the Most Valuable Player; that the Most Valuable Player for the Dodgers was Tinker Bell. But, tonight, I think Tinker Bell backed off for Kirk Gibson. And, look at Eckersley – shocked to his toes!" "They are going wild at Dodger Stadium – no one wants to leave!" As NBC showed a replay of Gibson rounding second base in his home run trot, Scully then made a point to note Eckersley's pitching performance throughout the 1988 season, to put things in perspective. "Dennis Eckersley allowed five home runs all year. And we'll be back."

The 1988 World Series marked the last time that NBC would televise a World Series for seven years. Beginning in 1990, NBC would be shut out of Major League Baseball coverage completely, after CBS signed a four-year, exclusive television contract. After splitting coverage of the 1995 World Series with ABC, NBC would next cover a World Series exclusively in 1997.

=== 1989 ===
In 1989 (the final year of ABC's contract with Major League Baseball), ABC moved the baseball telecasts to Thursday nights in hopes of getting leg up against NBC's Cosby Show. After braving the traumatic Loma Prieta earthquake and an all-time low 16.4 rating for the 1989 World Series,

As previously mentioned former President of the United States, Ronald Reagan (who had just left office) served as the color commentator instead of Tom Seaver (Vin Scully's normal NBC broadcasting partner at the time) for the first inning of the 1989 All-Star Game from Anaheim. Bo Jackson became a popular figure for his athleticism in multiple sports through the late 1980s and early 1990s. He served as a spokesman for Nike and was involved in a popular ad campaign called "Bo Knows" which envisioned Jackson attempting to take up a litany of other sports, including tennis, golf, luge, auto racing, and even playing blues music with Bo Diddley, who scolded Jackson by telling him, "You don't know diddley!" (in a later version of the spot, Jackson is shown playing the guitar expertly, after which an impressed Diddley says, "Bo...you do know Diddley, don't you?") Serendipitously, the original spot first aired during the commercial break immediately following Jackson's lead-off home run in the 1989 Major League Baseball All-Star Game (as Vin Scully exclaimed, "Look at that one! Bo Jackson says hello!").

On Saturday, June 3, 1989, Vin Scully was doing the play-by-play for the NBC Game of the Week in St. Louis, where the Cardinals beat the Chicago Cubs in 10 innings. Meanwhile, the Dodgers were playing a series in Houston, where Scully flew to be on hand to call the Sunday game of the series. However, the Saturday night game between the teams was going into extra innings when Scully arrived in town, so he went to the Astrodome instead of his hotel. He picked up the play-by-play, helping to relieve the other Dodger announcers, who were doing both television and radio, and broadcast the final 13 innings (after already calling 10 innings in St. Louis), as the game went 22 innings. He broadcast 23 innings in one day in two different cities.

CTV would simulcast NBC Game of the Week telecasts of Toronto Blue Jays games, such as NBC's final Game of the Week telecast on September 30, 1989, where the Blue Jays clinched the American League East against the Baltimore Orioles. Meanwhile, in the latter part of his career, National League umpire Doug Harvey became known for appearing in the "You Make the Call" segments on NBC's Game of the Week telecasts.

Then Texas Rangers manager Bobby Valentine worked as an on-the-field analyst for NBC's 1989 ALCS coverage. Likewise, recently retired Philadelphia Phillies legend Mike Schmidt did the same for the NLCS.

Vin Scully was unable to call Game 2 of the 1989 National League Championship Series (on Wednesday, October 4) because he was suffering from laryngitis. As a result, secondary play-by-play announcer Bob Costas filled in for him. Around the same time, Costas was assigned to call the American League Championship Series between Oakland and Toronto. Game 2 of the NLCS occurred on Thursday, October 5, which was an off day for the ALCS. NBC then decided to fly Costas from Toronto to Chicago to substitute for Scully on Thursday night. Afterwards, Costas flew back to Toronto, where he resumed work on the ALCS the next night.

Jimmy Cefalo hosted the pregame show for Game 4 of the 1989 ALCS as Marv Albert was away on an NFL assignment for NBC.

As previously mentioned, Game 3 of the 1989 World Series (initially scheduled for October 17) was delayed by ten days due to the Loma Prieta earthquake. The earthquake struck at approximately 5:04 p.m. Pacific Time. At the moment the quake struck, ABC's color commentator Tim McCarver was narrating taped highlights of the previous Series game. Viewers saw the video signal begin to break up, heard McCarver repeat a sentence as the shaking distracted him, and heard McCarver's colleague Al Michaels exclaim, "I'll tell you what, we're having an earth—." At that moment, the feed from Candlestick Park was lost. The network put up a green ABC Sports graphic as the audio was switched to a telephone link. Michaels had to pick up a POTS phone in the press booth (phones work off a separate power supply) and call ABC headquarters in New York, at which point they put him back on the air. Michaels cracked, "Well folks, that's the greatest open in the history of television, bar none!" accompanied by the excited screams of fans who had no idea of the devastation elsewhere.

After about a 15-minute delay (ABC aired a rerun of Roseanne and subsequently, The Wonder Years in the meantime), ABC was able to regain power via a backup generator. ABC's play-by-play man, Al Michaels (who was familiar with the San Francisco Bay Area dating back to his days working for the San Francisco Giants from 1974-1976) then proceeded to relay reports to Ted Koppel at ABC News' headquarters in Washington, D.C. Al Michaels was ultimately nominated for an Emmy for his on-site reporting at the World Series.

The Goodyear Blimp was aloft above the ballpark to provide aerial coverage of the World Series. Blimp pilot John Crayton reported that he felt four bumps during the quake. ABC was able to use the blimp to capture some of the first images of the damage to the Bay Bridge.

At this very moment ten days ago, we began our telecast with an aerial view of San Francisco; always a spectacular sight, and particularly so on that day because the cloudless sky of October 17 was ice blue, and the late-day sun sparkled like a thousand jewels.

That picture was very much a mirror of the feel and the mood that had enveloped the Bay Area...and most of Northern California. Their baseball teams, the Giants and A's, had won pennants, and the people of this region were still basking in the afterglow of each team's success. And this great American sporting classic, the World Series, was, for the time being, exclusively theirs.

Then of course the feeling of pure radiance was transformed into horror and grief and despair - in just fifteen seconds. And now on October 27, like a fighter who's taken a vicious blow to the stomach and has groggily arisen, this region moves on and moves ahead.

And one part of that scenario is the resumption of the World Series. No one in this ballpark tonight - no player, no vendor, no fan, no writer, no announcer, in fact, no one in this area period - can forget the images. The column of smoke in the Marina. The severed bridge. The grotesque tangle of concrete in Oakland. The pictures are embedded in our minds.

And while the mourning and the suffering and the aftereffects will continue, in about thirty minutes the plate umpire, Vic Voltaggio will say 'Play Ball', and the players will play, the vendors will sell, the announcers will announce, the crowd will exhort. And for many of the six million people in this region, it will be like revisiting Fantasyland.

But Fantasyland is where baseball comes from anyway and maybe right about now that's the perfect place for a three-hour rest.

— Al Michaels at the beginning of ABC's telecast of the resumption of Game 3 of the 1989 World Series.

==== The end of the ABC-NBC pact ====
After calling the 1988 World Series with Vin Scully, Joe Garagiola resigned from NBC Sports. Although it was not official at the time, NBC was on the verge of losing the television rights to cover Major League Baseball to CBS. Garagiola claimed that NBC left him "twisting" while he was trying to renegotiate his deal. Joe Garagiola was replaced by Tom Seaver for the 1989 season.

Al Michaels took ABC's loss of baseball to CBS as "tough to accept."Michaels added that "baseball was such an early stepchild at ABC and had come such a long way." Gary Thorne, who served as ABC's backup play-by-play announcer in 1989 and was an on-field reporter for the World Series that year (and covering the trophy presentation in the process), simply laughed while saying "Great reviews, just as ABC baseball ends." After ABC lost the Major League Baseball package to CBS, they aggressively counterprogrammed CBS' postseason baseball coverage with made-for-TV movies and miniseries geared towards female viewers.

I'll miss it. I've been involved with this (ABC) package since Day One (in 1976). Especially now, because beginning with our postseason coverage in 1985 [That's when analysts Jim Palmer and Tim McCarver permanently joined ABC's baseball crew, teaming with producer Curt Gowdy Jr. and director Craig Janoff], I really felt we'd put it together the way I'd always dreamed about it. In the early years, we attempted to cover it in a different fashion. ABC had been gigantically successful with 'Wide World of Sports' and with covering the Olympic Games. A number of people in our company wanted to cover baseball (like) gymnastics and swimming and other 'Wide World' events. Attempting to do that was basically, in the early years, an abysmal failure. Baseball needs to be looked at in a certain manner. You need people in it who understand the game and truly love the game. It took us a while to get the right people and the right group together. I know some of the NBC people recently have talked about their cameramen, their audio men, the guys involved with their telecasts are baseball fans. They love baseball. It took us a while to get up to speed in that area. But once we did, we began to cover it as well as it's been covered. I'm tremendously proud of what we have done, especially from the 1985 postseason coverage on. We got to a point, especially in the last couple of years, (where) nothing can stop us now. And the only thing that stopped us was the fact we lost the rights.

— Al Michaels to the Chicago Tribune on October 17, 1989.

NBC's final Major League Baseball broadcast was televised on October 9, 1989; Game 5 of the National League Championship Series between the San Francisco Giants and Chicago Cubs from Candlestick Park. Vin Scully said "It's a passing of a great American tradition. It is sad. I really and truly feel that. It will leave a vast window, to use a Washington word, where people will not get Major League Baseball and I think that's a tragedy. It's a staple that's gone. I feel for people who come to me and say how they miss it, and I hope me."

Bob Costas said that he would rather do a Game of the Week that got a 5 rating than host a Super Bowl. "Who thought baseball killed its best way to reach the public? It coulda kept us and CBS – we'd have kept the 'Game' – but it only cared about cash. Whatever else I did, I'd never have left 'Game of the Week' Costas claimed. Tony Kubek, who (as previously mentioned) teamed with Bob Costas since 1983, said "I can't believe it!" when the subject came about NBC losing baseball for the first time since 1947.

Author and presidential speechwriter Curt Smith went a step further in saying that Major League Baseball's deal with CBS Sports was "sportscasting's Exxon Valdez." Had baseball valued national promotion provided by the Game of the Week, said Smith, it never would have crafted a fast-bucks plan that has cut off the widest viewership. "It's an obscene imbalance", Smith also said, "to have 175 games going to 60 percent of the country [in reference to Major League Baseball's corresponding cable television deal with ESPN, which at the time was only available in about 60% of the country] and 16 games going to the rest." He added: "Baseball has paid a grievous price for being out of sight and out of mind. It's attacked the lower and middle classes that forms baseball's heart. ... In the end, the advertising community has come to view baseball as a leper."

One possible key factor towards why NBC lost the baseball package to CBS was due to their commitment to broadcasting the 1992 Summer Olympics from Barcelona.

After NBC lost the Major League Baseball package to CBS, the network aggressively counterprogrammed CBS's postseason baseball coverage with made-for-TV movies and miniseries geared towards female viewers.

Since this is indeed...a sad moment for us as we sever our relationship with baseball...for a while at least, we would like to ask your indulgence and let us take this time to thank a lot of people!

— Vin Scully prior to reading off the credits for NBC's 1989 NLCS coverage following the San Francisco Giants' pennant clinching victory against the Chicago Cubs.

And to all of the marvelous and wonderful cameramen and technicians who have represented NBC...over the 42 years of baseball broadcasts...and I think that can sum it up, each and everyone of us...we gave it our best shot! As did the Giants and the Cubs! And it's the Giants who go to the World Series, beating the Cubs 3 to 2. And we get the BART Series, the Bay Area Rapid Transit, the series that will be played in the memory of A. Bartlett Giamatti. There's a sweetness to that thought! It's over for us...time to surrender the stage...and the Giants have won the pennant! For Tom Seaver and for Mike Schmidt, this is Vin Scully saying so long...for the last time...from San Francisco!

— Vin Scully's final words as NBC signs off from its Major League Baseball coverage for the final time on October 9, 1989.

To those of you at NBC, for 41 years you made this an art form! And to people especially like Curt Gowdy, Sr., the fabulous announcer...to the Hall of Fame director Harry Coyle...and down through the years...to Tony Kubek and the people of the present like Bob Costas and all the men and women at NBC, at the peacock...take a bow, you were terrific!

— ABC's Al Michaels eulogizing NBC at the end of ABC's coverage of Game 4 the 1989 World Series.

If you'll indulge us just another moment, this is the end of our association with baseball. I think as many of you may know, the primary package goes to CBS. And to our friends at what's known in the industry as "Black Rock", good luck in 1990 and beyond.

— Al Michaels at the end of ABC's coverage of the 1989 World Series.
