= Kirk Gibson's 1988 World Series home run =

Walkoff home run to win game 1 of 1988 WS

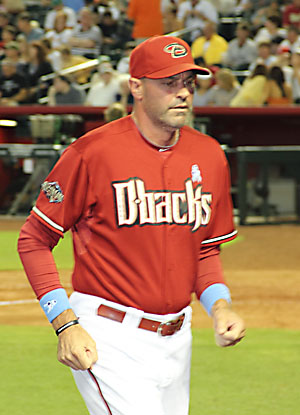
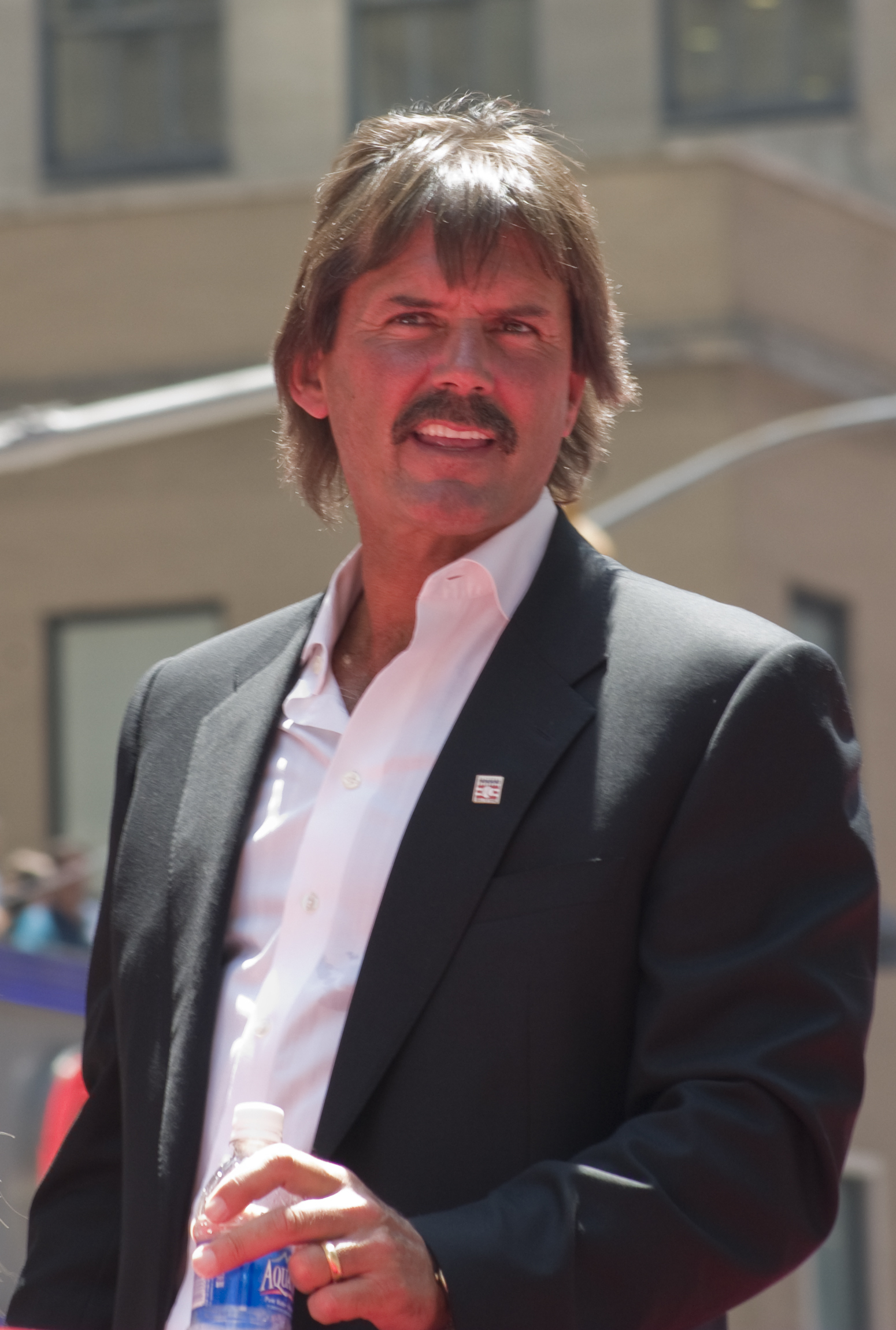
Kirk Gibson (at left, in 2011) and Dennis Eckersley (at right, in 2008), batter and pitcher of the walk-off home run in Game 1 of the 1988 World Series.

In Game 1 of the 1988 World Series at Dodger Stadium in Los Angeles on October 15, 1988, the Los Angeles Dodgers' Kirk Gibson hit a two-out, two-run walk-off home run against Oakland Athletics pitcher Dennis Eckersley in the bottom of the ninth inning to give the Dodgers the 5–4 win. Gibson was initially held out of the lineup with injuries to both legs, but was called upon to pinch hit.

After winning the National League (NL) West division, the Dodgers were considered the underdogs throughout the 1988 postseason, first to the New York Mets in the NL Championship Series, then to the Athletics in the World Series. Gibson, who was not expected to play due to injuries in both legs sustained during the NLCS, was surprisingly inserted as a pinch hitter with the Dodgers trailing 4–3 with two outs in the bottom of the ninth inning and the tying run at first base. Gibson's home run—his only plate appearance of the series—helped the Dodgers defeat the Athletics, four games to one, securing their sixth World Series title.

The play has since become legendary in the baseball world, and is regarded as one of the greatest home runs of all time. It was voted the "greatest moment in L.A. sports history" in a 1995 poll. Many of the images associated with the home run, particularly Gibson pumping his fist while circling the bases, are often shown in classic highlight reels, usually accompanied by play-by-play from broadcasters Vin Scully or Jack Buck. Though not related to his World Series home run, Gibson would be named the 1988 NL Most Valuable Player.

== Background ==
=== Regular season ===
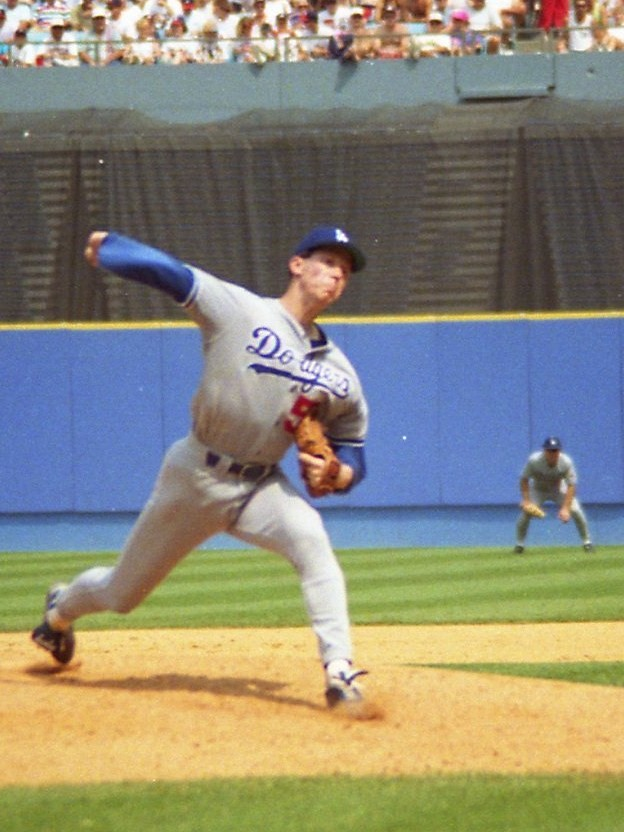
Orel Hershiser (pictured in 1993) would be named the 1988 World Series MVP.

The Dodgers signed outfielder Kirk Gibson as a free agent during the 1987-88 offseason. Gibson, who played the previous nine seasons with the Detroit Tigers (winning a World Series title with them in 1984), quickly became the Dodgers' de facto leader both on the field and off. On the field, Gibson led the team with 25 home runs, a .290 batting average and 31 stolen bases.

The Dodgers, who had only finished 4th in the National League West in 1987 with a 73–89 (.451) record (17 games behind the division winning San Francisco Giants), led the NL West division standings from late May until the end of the season, easily winning the division title with a record of 94–67 (.584), seven games ahead of the second-place Cincinnati Reds.

One reason why the Dodgers were considered underdogs throughout the postseason was that they did not finish the regular season ranked in the top five of any major offensive statistical category. However, they were strengthened by an excellent starting rotation led by ace Orel Hershiser and backed up by Tim Belcher, John Tudor and Tim Leary. They also had an outstanding bullpen that included Jay Howell, Jesse Orosco and Alejandro Peña.

=== Postseason ===
Their opponent in the National League Championship Series was the New York Mets, who had compiled a more impressive 100–60 (.625) regular season record, and had won 10 of their 11 regular-season meetings with the Dodgers. The NLCS was a surprisingly close contest given the outcomes of the two teams' regular season meetings. Gibson's heroics in the series included a highlight reel catch on wet grass in Game 3 and decisive home runs in Games 4 and 5. The series went to a deciding Game 7, which the Dodgers won in stunning fashion on the back of Hershiser's five-hit shutout to earn their first World Series trip since 1981. Gibson injured his left hamstring while stealing second base in Game 5 and his right knee while sliding into second base in Game 7.

After defeating the Mets, the Dodgers faced the Oakland Athletics in the World Series. Oakland had compiled a 104–58 (.642) regular season record (the best in the Majors), and boasted a powerful lineup led by sluggers Jose Canseco and Mark McGwire, and complemented by the likes of Dave Henderson, Dave Parker and Don Baylor. The A's, who also boasted 20-game winner Dave Stewart (himself a former Dodger from 1978 to 1983) and closer Dennis Eckersley who had saved 45 games during the regular season, had easily accounted for Boston in the ALCS, sweeping the Red Sox 4–0.

== The setup ==
=== World Series Game 1 ===
Gibson injured both legs during the NLCS, and therefore did not start Game 1. Los Angeles took an early lead when Mickey Hatcher, a utility player not known for his power hitting, smashed a two-run home run in the first inning. The next inning Canseco hit a grand slam to give Oakland a two-run lead. Oakland's lead was cut to one run when Mike Scioscia hit an RBI single in the sixth inning that scored Mike Marshall, leaving the match at a score of 4-3.

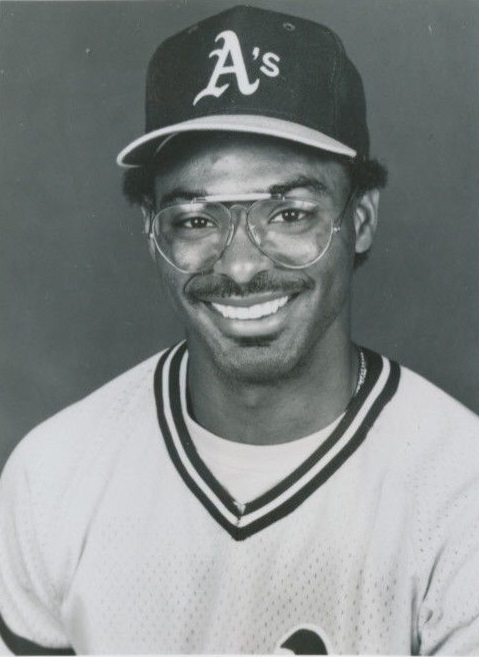
Mike Davis, shown here with Oakland, drew a walk ahead of Gibson's at bat, and was on base as the Dodgers' potential tying run.

Unknown to the fans and the media at the time, Gibson was watching the game on television while undergoing physical therapy in the Dodgers' clubhouse. At some point during the game, television cameras scanned the Dodgers dugout and commentator Vin Scully, working for NBC for the 1988 postseason, observed that Gibson was "nowhere to be found". This spurred Gibson to tell Dodgers manager Tommy Lasorda that he was available to pinch hit. Gibson immediately returned to the batting cage in the clubhouse to take practice swings.

With a one-run lead, Oakland closer and future Hall of Famer Dennis Eckersley, who led the AL with 45 saves during the regular season, was brought in to close out the game and seal the win for starter Dave Stewart. Eckersley quickly got Scioscia to pop out to shortstop and struck out Jeff Hamilton. Left-handed pinch hitter Mike Davis (a former Athletic) followed; if he got on base the next batter due was the pitcher's spot, which would certainly be filled with a pinch hitter. Not wanting the A's to realize that Gibson was available, Lasorda sent Dave Anderson to the on-deck circle during Davis' plate appearance. According to Lasorda, A's catcher Ron Hassey got Eckersley's attention and pointed at Anderson on-deck. The popular story is that Eckersley pitched around Davis because the A's thought that the light-hitting Anderson was the next batter. Hassey vehemently denied that the A's pitched carefully to Davis because Anderson was on deck: "Why would we pitch around Davis when we have two outs? You don't pitch around a guy with two outs to face another hitter. That would never make sense. You have your closer out there. That's just not true. That's a good story. As far as I know, Gibson is on the roster. Is he not? You're not going to waste a guy that can't play. He's active." Eckersley decided to pitch around Davis because he had seen him hit 20 home runs for the A's before the All-Star break the previous year. Instead of risking making a mistake that Davis could hit for a game-tying home run, Eckersley pitched carefully and did in fact walk him.

== The play ==
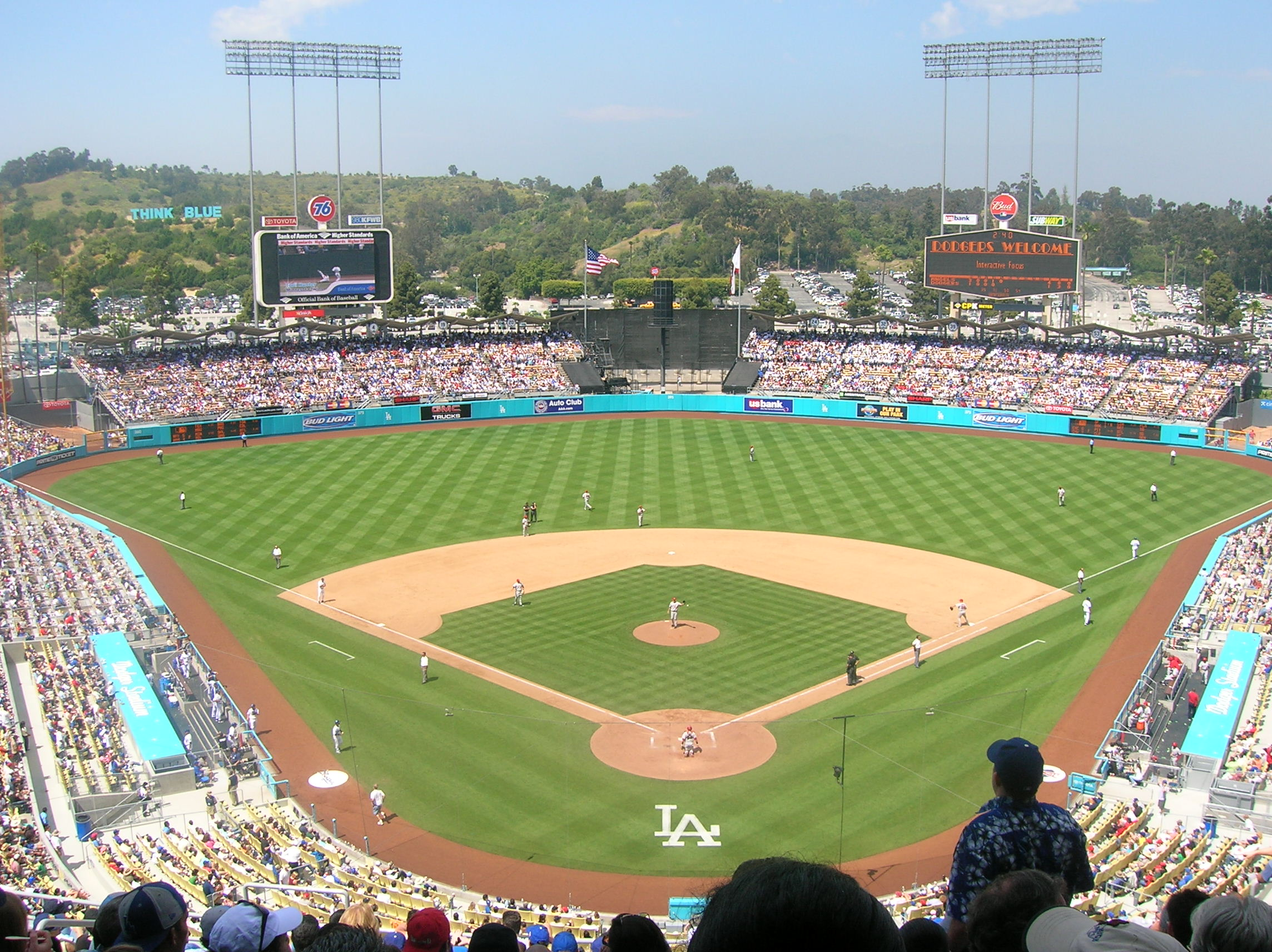
Dodger Stadium, where the home run was hit.

Instead of sending Anderson to the plate, Lasorda inserted Gibson as his pinch hitter. Gibson hobbled up to the plate with Scully commenting, "And look who's coming up!" Gibson quickly fouled off two pitches, getting behind in the count, 0–2. He then swung clumsily and dribbled the ensuing pitch foul down the first base line, which seemed to confirm his inability to swing with any authority. Gibson took an outside pitch, called a ball by home plate umpire Doug Harvey, fouled off a pitch, and then took another outside pitch to work to a 2–2 count.

On the seventh pitch of the at bat—another ball, making it a full count—Davis stole second. Dodger manager Tommy Lasorda later recounted it was pre-planned that if the count got to two strikes on Gibson, they would have Davis steal second, figuring that A's manager Tony La Russa would not elect to intentionally walk Gibson if there were already two strikes against him. Once Davis was at second, Lasorda was just hoping Gibson could muscle a pitch to the outfield for a game-tying single.

Gibson would later recount that prior to the Series, Dodger scout Mel Didier had provided a report on Eckersley which claimed that with a 3–2 count against a left-handed hitter, one could be absolutely certain that Eckersley would throw a backdoor slider. Gibson said that when the count reached 3–2, he stepped out of the batter's box and, in his mind, could hear Didier's voice, with its distinctive Southern drawl, reiterating that same piece of advice. With that thought in mind, Gibson stepped back into the batter's box; and thus when Eckersley did in fact throw a backdoor slider, it was exactly the pitch Gibson was expecting.

Swinging almost entirely with his upper body, Gibson then hit the pitch over the right-field fence. He limped around the bases and pumped his fist as his teammates stormed the field. The Dodgers won the game, 5–4.

Gibson did not have another plate appearance in the World Series. The Dodgers went on to defeat the A's in the World Series, 4–1.

== The calls ==
=== Don Drysdale ===
Don Drysdale called Kirk Gibson's walk-off home run for the Dodgers Radio Network:

Well, the crowd on its feet and if there was ever a preface, to "Casey at the Bat," it would have to be the ninth inning. Two out. The tying run aboard, the winning run at the plate, and Kirk Gibson, standing at the plate. Gibson, a deep sigh ... re-gripping the bat ... shoulders just shrugged ... now goes to the top of the helmet, as he always does ... steps in with that left foot. Eckersley, working out of the stretch ... here's the three-two pitch ... and a drive hit to right field (voice changes to high pitch) WAY BACK!! THIS BALL ... IS GONE! (After delay) This crowd will not stop! They can't believe the ending! And this time, Mighty Casey did NOT strike out!

=== Vin Scully ===
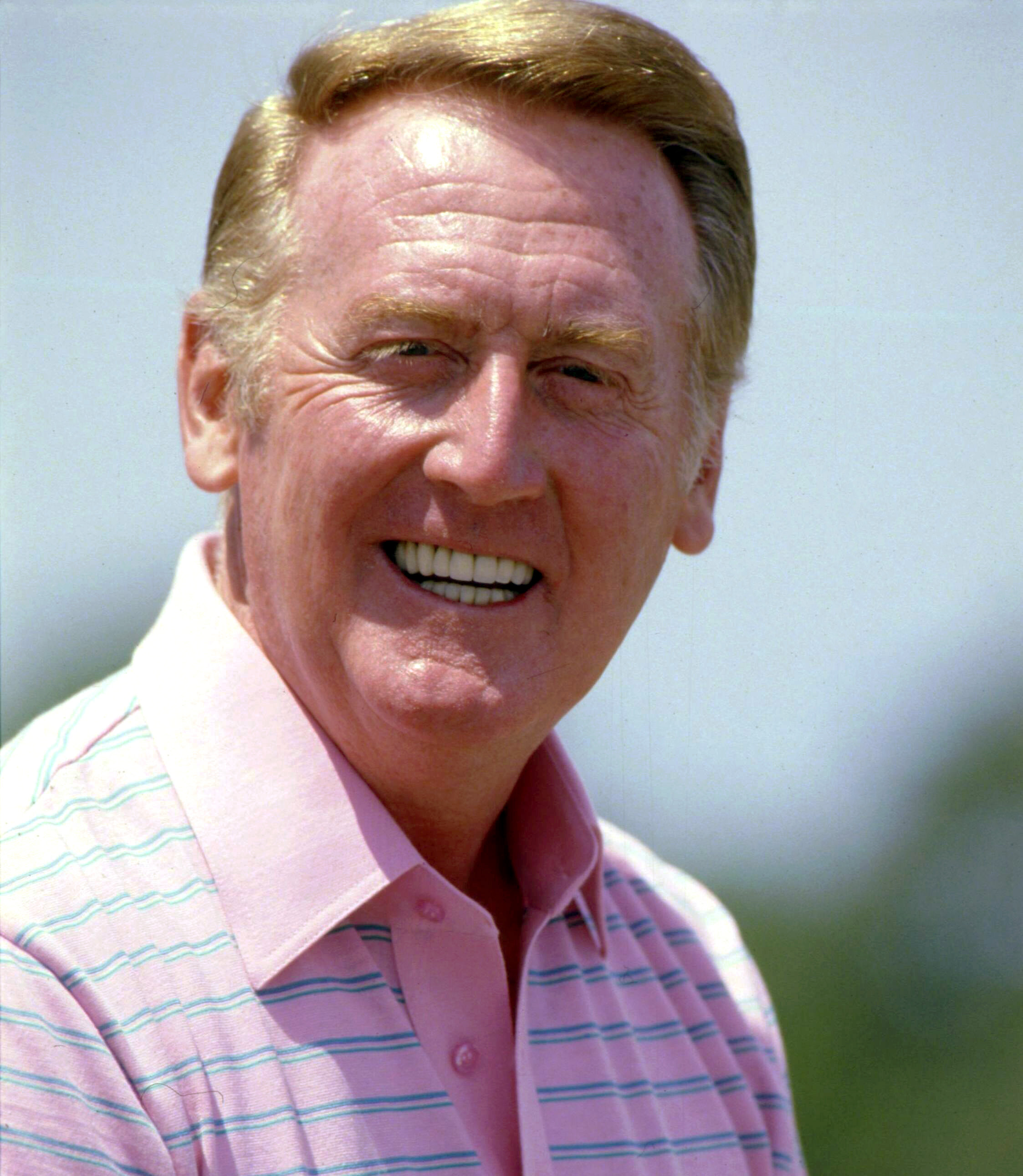
NBC television announcer Vin Scully.

All year long, they looked to him to light the fire, [Scully began]

and all year long, he answered the demands, until he was physically unable to start tonight—with two bad legs: The bad left hamstring, and the swollen right knee. And, with two out, you talk about a roll of the dice... this is it.

Scully, calling the play-by-play for the NBC-TV (as previously mentioned) broadcast with color commentator Joe Garagiola, made repeated references to Gibson's legs, noting at one point that the batter was

shaking his left leg, making it quiver, like a horse trying to get rid of a troublesome fly.

Gibson worked the count to 3–2 as Mike Davis stole second base; the camera turned at that point to Steve Sax getting ready for his turn at the plate, and Scully reminded the viewers that

Sax waiting on deck but the game right now is at the plate.

High fly ball into right field, she is... GONE!

Scully said nothing for over a minute, allowing the pictures to tell the story. Finally, he said,

In a year that has been so improbable, the impossible has happened!

Returning to the subject of Gibson's banged-up legs during a replay, Scully joked,

And, now, the only question was, could he make it around the base paths unassisted?!

You know, I said it once before, a few days ago, that Kirk Gibson was not the Most Valuable Player; that the Most Valuable Player for the Dodgers was Tinker Bell. But, tonight, I think Tinker Bell backed off for Kirk Gibson. And, look at Eckersley—shocked to his toes!

They are going wild at Dodger Stadium—no one wants to leave!

As NBC showed a replay of Gibson rounding second base in his home run trot, Scully then made a point to note Eckersley's pitching performance throughout the 1988 season, to put things in perspective.

Dennis Eckersley allowed five home runs all year. And we'll be back.

=== Jack Buck ===
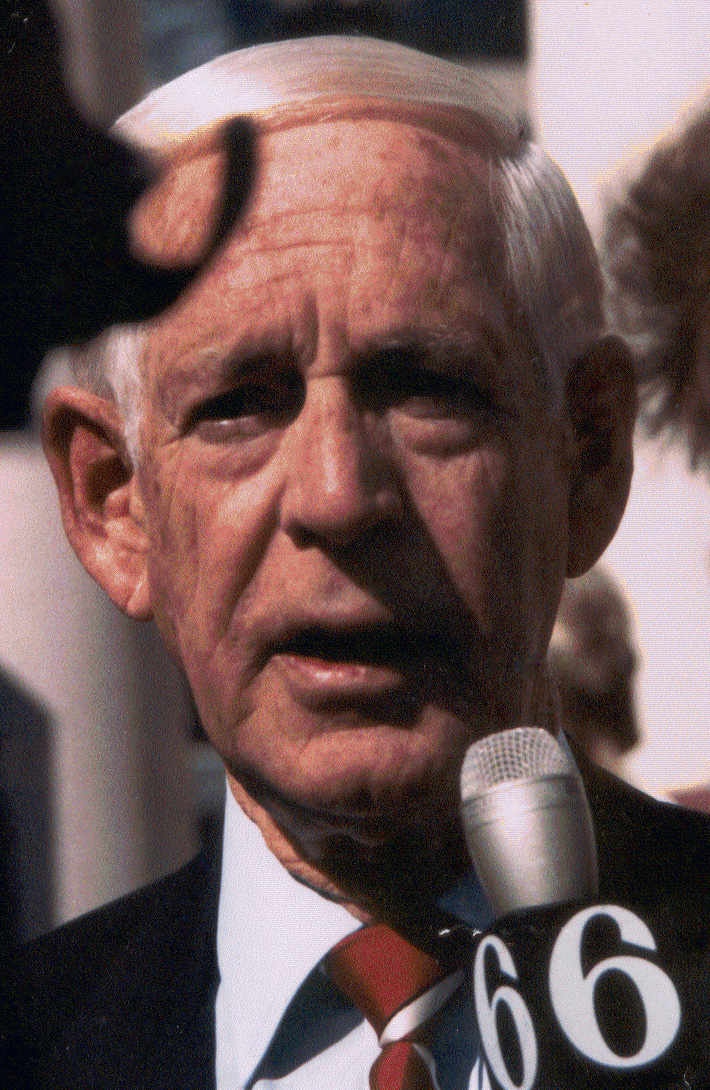
CBS Radio announcer Jack Buck.

CBS handled the national radio broadcast of the 1988 World Series, with Jack Buck providing play-by-play and Bill White as the analyst. This was Buck's call, beginning with Buck speculating on what might happen if Gibson managed to reach base:

... then you would run for Gibson and have Sax batting. But, we have a big 3–2 pitch coming here from Eckersley. Gibson swings, and a fly ball to deep right field! THIS IS GONNA BE A HOME RUN! UNBELIEVABLE!! A home run for Gibson! And the Dodgers have won the game, five to four; I don't believe what I just saw!!

The last sentence is often remembered and quoted by fans. Buck followed it with,

I don't believe what I just saw! Is this really happening, Bill?

White responded,

It is happening, and they've got to help him home! The third base coach, Joey Amalfitano, had to give him a little push, and all the Dodgers are 'round home plate!

Buck repeated his exclamation and concluded his comments on Gibson's amazing feat with this thought:

I don't believe what I just saw! One of the most remarkable finishes to any World Series Game...a one-handed home run by Kirk Gibson! And the Dodgers have won it...five to four; and I'm stunned, Bill. I have seen a lot of dramatic finishes in a lot of sports, but this one might top almost every other one.

=== Bill King ===
Bill King called Kirk Gibson's walk-off home run for the Oakland Athletics Radio Network:

Eck has not thrown that slider. Swung on...drive...right field. DEEP, WAY BACK...GONE!!! Gibson has won it with a home run into the right field pavilion! And the Dodgers have won the first game of the World Series! (After delay) Gibson raided by the entire Dodger roster at home plate! The hobbled hero battling Eckersley to three and two, and then launching a shot...into the right field pavilion, between the 360 and 370 marks! A devastating blow...with the A's one strike from victory! And the Dodgers continue what Lasorda has been labeling...the miracle performance! Gibson is mobbed and gets a big kiss from Lasorda. And the A's have been thrown a challenge here tonight! One that they have to come back to tomorrow...and encounter Orel Hershiser! What an incredible finish...at Dodger Stadium!

== Aftermath ==
The NBC broadcast that was broadcast entirely by the network (despite Macon, Georgia's affiliate WMGT-TV recovered from the broadcast hijack that happened earlier in the game), when following Gibson's home run happened, also captured the brake lights of some Dodger fans who were leaving Dodger Stadium believing the game was lost. Among those were future Boston Red Sox chairman and Roseanne executive producer (which premiered three days after the game) Tom Werner and his son, future Milwaukee Brewers senior Vice President Teddy Werner.

Much was made about Eckersley's decision to throw an offspeed pitch to Gibson, with Joe Garagiola repeatedly noting that Gibson clearly couldn't catch up to a fastball. To his credit, Eckersley fielded every reporters' question after the game, mostly blaming himself. Years later, he recalled, "Somebody said that the Dodgers knew I threw a backdoor slider on 3–2. I don’t know if that’s true or not. I didn’t get to 3–2 that often, but if that’s what the guy told him [Gibson], if that’s what he had on his mind, good for him. Either way, it was a terrible slider."

The home run was included as a finalist in a Major League Baseball contest to determine the sport's "Greatest Moment of All-Time." For years after the fact, it was regularly used in This Week in Baseball's closing montage sequence. An edited audio of Scully's 1988 call has been used in 2005 post-season action, in a TV ad featuring a recreational softball game, with a portly player essentially re-enacting that entire moment as he hits the softball over the right field fence to win the game. It was in competition on ESPN's SportsCenter for the Greatest Sports Highlight of All-Time.

By the time Gibson returned to his locker for postgame interviews, Dodger bullpen coach Mark Cresse had taped the name of Roy Hobbs over Gibson's nameplate, in reference to Gibson's heroics mirroring those of the film slugger that Robert Redford had played in The Natural. Like Hobbs in the film's climactic scene, Gibson had represented the winning run when he came to the plate, was battling injury, had been down to his (and the team's) final strike and had homered to right field to win the game. NBC's pregame video for Game 2 narrated by Bob Costas included both the home run and its film counterpart.

The fate of the ball itself is unknown. According to Gibson, a woman sent him a picture of the bruise on her leg where the ball hit her, although no one has yet come forward with the ball. In fiction, a court struggle over the ownership of the ball was the primary plot of the June 29, 2011, episode of TNT legal drama Franklin & Bash.

Near the end of the Major League Baseball season in the fall of 2011, Chevrolet began airing commercials for their Diamond & Dream's Program, a giveaway designed to help the youth in their communities around the country. Prizes included a makeover for their baseball field. The commercials showed selected little league baseball players acting out some of baseball's greatest moments in history. One of them was Kirk Gibson's famous home run from the 1988 World Championship run of the Los Angeles Dodgers. The young boy acting out this moment could be seen running the bases, doing the same fist pump motion that Gibson was seen doing during his famous run around the bases.

By the 2011 season, Kirk Gibson was managing the Arizona Diamondbacks. In the second to last game that season, Arizona Diamondbacks utility man Ryan Roberts hit a game-winning walk-off grand slam to defeat the Los Angeles Dodgers, 7-6, capping a dramatic 10th inning rally. During this walk-off grand slam, Roberts began pumping his left arm in a salute to his manager's 1988 World Series game one home run.

Before the start of the 2018 season, the Dodgers commemorated the anniversary of Gibson's homerun with the introduction of the “Kirk Gibson seat,” which is where his home run landed after winning Game 1 of the 1988 World Series. The seat in question was Section 302, Row D, Seat 1, though the Dodgers have renumbered that seat 88. The seat was painted blue and signed by Gibson and the tickets cost $300, which included a $200 donation to the Kirk Gibson Foundation to raise money and awareness for Parkinson's Research.

In Game 4 of the 2018 World Series between the Dodgers and the Red Sox, 30 years after that 1988 World Series walk-off home run, Eckersley (who was there covering the Red Sox as a NESN color commentator and analyst) and Gibson reunited for the ceremonial first pitch at Dodger Stadium and Gibson had a bat ready before catching Eckersley's pitch.

=== In relation to Freddie Freeman's 2024 World Series home run ===
Freddie Freeman's grand slam off the New York Yankees' Nestor Cortés Jr. to win Game 1 in the tenth inning of the 2024 World Series for the Dodgers—the first walk-off grand slam in World Series history—was widely compared to Gibson's home run. Like Gibson, Freeman was playing through injury—in Freeman's case, a badly sprained ankle and also a fractured rib that was revealed after the Dodgers won the series. Both players also came to bat with the Dodgers trailing by a run and down to their last out in Game 1 of the World Series. Broadcaster Joe Davis' call on Fox's national broadcast of "...she is gone!" echoed Scully's call for the Gibson homer, and Davis also added, "Gibby, meet Freddie!" In addition, both Gibson's and Freeman's home runs were to right field at Dodger Stadium, in almost the same spot, and both came at 8:37 p.m. Pacific Time. Finally, just like 1988, the Dodgers would end up winning the series in 5 games.

On opening day for the Dodgers in 2025, Gibson threw out the ceremonial first pitch to Freeman, bringing Davis' call full circle.
