= 1988 World Series =

85th edition of Major League Baseball's championship series

Team (Wins)	Managers	Season
Los Angeles Dodgers (4)	Tommy Lasorda	94–67, .584, GA: 7
Oakland Athletics (1)	Tony La Russa	104–58, .642, GA: 13
- Dates: October 15–20
- Venue(s): Dodger Stadium (Los Angeles); Oakland–Alameda County Coliseum (Oakland)
- MVP: Orel Hershiser (Los Angeles)
- Umpires: Doug Harvey (NL), Durwood Merrill (AL), Bruce Froemming (NL), Derryl Cousins (AL), Jerry Crawford (NL), Larry McCoy (AL)
- Hall of Famers: Umpire: Doug Harvey; Dodgers: Tommy Lasorda (manager); Athletics: Tony La Russa (manager); Dennis Eckersley; Dave Parker

Broadcast
- Television: NBC
- TV announcers: Vin Scully and Joe Garagiola
- Radio: CBS; KABC (LA); KSFO (OAK)
- Radio announcers: Jack Buck and Bill White; Ross Porter and Don Drysdale (KABC); Bill King and Lon Simmons (KSFO)
- ALCS: Oakland Athletics over Boston Red Sox (4–0)
- NLCS: Los Angeles Dodgers over New York Mets (4–3)

The 1988 World Series was the championship series of Major League Baseball's (MLB) 1988 season. The 85th edition of the World Series, it was a best-of-seven playoff played between the American League (AL) champion Oakland Athletics and the National League (NL) champion Los Angeles Dodgers, with the Dodgers upsetting the heavily favored Athletics to win the Series in five games to win their sixth championship.

The series is best known for the Game 1 pinch-hit walk-off home run by star Dodgers outfielder Kirk Gibson, who did not start because of injuries to both legs yet hit the winning homer against Athletics closer Dennis Eckersley. Although Gibson's homer has become an iconic World Series moment, it was World Series MVP Orel Hershiser who capped a dominant 1988 season in which he set the all time scoreless inning streak at 59 innings, recorded five straight shutouts, led the league with 23 wins and 267 innings, and won the Cy Young and Gold Glove awards. Hershiser was the NL Championship Series MVP, starting three games, getting the save for Game 4, and shutting out the Mets in Game 7. In the World Series, he shut out the A's in Game 2, and pitched a two-run, complete game in the decisive Game 5 victory.

The Dodgers won the NL West division by seven games over the Cincinnati Reds, then upset the New York Mets, 4 games to 3, in the NLCS. The Athletics won the AL West division by 13 games over the Minnesota Twins, then swept the Boston Red Sox, 4 games to 0, in the AL Championship Series.

The Dodgers were the only MLB team to win more than one World Series title in the 1980s, as they had previously won the championship in 1981. Their victory also broke a 10-year streak in which 10 different major league ballclubs won a World Series with no repeat winners. They would not win another World Series until 2020.

== Preview ==
=== Los Angeles Dodgers ===
The Dodgers' team batting did not finish in the top five in any offensive statistical category except batting average (fifth), at .248—no regular or backup hit over .300 or drove in over 90 runs. Kirk Gibson's 25 home runs led the team but was only good enough for seventh in the National League. Slugger Pedro Guerrero had a sub-par year and was traded in July to the Cardinals for starting pitcher John Tudor. Kirk Gibson was the only Dodgers position player named to the All-Star Game, but declined the invitation.

However, the Dodgers were sixth in the NL in runs scored and backed that up with excellent pitching. Despite trading All-Star pitcher Bob Welch (to Oakland, ironically) prior to spring training and an injury to Fernando Valenzuela (5–8, 4.24 ERA), the Dodgers were second in the NL in team ERA and runs allowed, and led the league in complete games and shutouts. The staff was anchored by Cy Young Award-winner Orel Hershiser, who led the league in wins, won-loss percentage (23–8, .864), complete games (15), shutouts (8), and sacrifice hits (19).

Hershiser was backed up by a pair of Tims, Tim Leary (17–11, 2.91) and rookie Tim Belcher (12–6, 2.91), and the July acquisition of John Tudor further strengthened the staff. The bullpen was outstanding, headed by Jay Howell (21 saves, 2.08), Alejandro Peña (12 saves, 1.91), Brian Holton, and longtime New York Mets closer Jesse Orosco. The Dodger bullpen led the league in saves with 49.

It was intensity and fortitude, however, that defined the 1988 Dodgers, a trend that began when Kirk Gibson was signed as a free agent over the winter from the Detroit Tigers, the team he helped lead to the 1984 World Championship. Moreover, the invincible Hershiser threw shutouts in five of his last six regular-season starts en route to a record 59 consecutive scoreless innings pitched, breaking the mark held by former Dodger great Don Drysdale. Hershiser would dominate the Mets in the NLCS, while Gibson hobbled through on bad knees and a bruised hamstring but would produce a memorable, if not the greatest, at-bat (in Game 1) of the World Series. Coincidentally, this was the second time the Dodgers had a no-hitter or a perfect game thrown against them in a season ending with a world championship. In 1981, Nolan Ryan tossed his record-breaking fifth no-hitter (breaking the mark of four set by ex-Dodger pitcher Sandy Koufax) against a Dodger team that won the World Series. In 1988, Tom Browning of the Cincinnati Reds threw a perfect game which was also against a Los Angeles team that won it all.

=== Oakland Athletics ===
The Oakland Athletics had all the confidence of a heavily favored team. The "Bash Brothers" duo of Mark McGwire (32 home runs, 99 RBI, .260 batting average) and José Canseco (42 home runs, 124 RBI, .307 batting average) were in their early 20s, emerging as young superstars. Canseco became the first player to hit 40 or more home runs and steal 40 or more bases in Major League history and would capture the Most Valuable Player award in the American League. Veterans Dave Henderson (24 home runs, 94 RBI, .304 batting average) and longtime Pirate Dave Parker (12 home runs, 55 RBI, .257 batting average), also contributed with both their bats and their experience. The 1988 World Series marked Don Baylor's third consecutive World Series with three separate teams. Besides being a member of the 1988 Athletics, Baylor was also a member of the 1986 Boston Red Sox, and 1987 Minnesota Twins.

The Oakland pitching staff was quite possibly the best in the American League in 1988. They led in ERA (3.44), wins (104), saves (64), and were second in strikeouts (983) and second in fewest runs allowed and home runs allowed. The ace of the staff was Dave Stewart, an ex-Dodger (1978–83), who won 20 games for the second straight season. Another ex-Dodger was reliable Bob Welch (17–9, 3.64) followed by 16-game winner Storm Davis. After spending the previous 12 years as a starter, mostly for the Boston Red Sox and Chicago Cubs, Dennis Eckersley would be converted into a closer in 1987 and would lead the American League in saves in 1988 with 45. He would eventually have a distinguished 24-year career, gaining election into the Hall of Fame in 2004. Another longtime starter (and another ex-Dodger), Rick Honeycutt, proved to be a capable set-up man to Eckersley, finishing with three wins and seven saves.

== Summary ==
NL Los Angeles Dodgers (4) vs. AL Oakland Athletics (1)

Game	Date	Score	Location	Time	Attendance
1	October 15	Oakland Athletics – 4, Los Angeles Dodgers – 5	Dodger Stadium	3:04	55,983
2	October 16	Oakland Athletics – 0, Los Angeles Dodgers – 6	Dodger Stadium	2:30	56,051
3	October 18	Los Angeles Dodgers – 1, Oakland Athletics – 2	Oakland–Alameda County Coliseum	3:21	49,316
4	October 19	Los Angeles Dodgers – 4, Oakland Athletics – 3	Oakland–Alameda County Coliseum	3:05	49,317
5	October 20	Los Angeles Dodgers – 5, Oakland Athletics – 2	Oakland–Alameda County Coliseum	2:51	49,317

== Matchups ==
=== Game 1 ===
Saturday, October 15, 1988 5:30 pm (PT) at Dodger Stadium in Los Angeles, California 68 °F (20 °C), clear
Team	1	2	3	4	5	6	7	8	9	R	H	E
Oakland	0	4	0	0	0	0	0	0	0	4	7	0
Los Angeles	2	0	0	0	0	1	0	0	2	5	7	0
WP: Alejandro Peña (1–0) LP: Dennis Eckersley (0–1); Home runs: OAK: José Canseco (1); LAD: Mickey Hatcher (1), Kirk Gibson (1)

With Kirk Gibson unable to start and officially listed as day-to-day due to a pulled left hamstring and a severely swollen right knee, sustained on awkward slides into second base in the NLCS in Games 5 and 7, the Dodgers were at a disadvantage. Additionally, because ace Orel Hershiser pitched in Game 7 of the NLCS, the Dodgers started rookie Tim Belcher in Game 1, and would be unable to start Hershiser three times in a potential seven-game series as they had in the NLCS. Meanwhile, Oakland, having swept the ALCS, sent a well-rested Dave Stewart to the mound. Both pitchers, however, would have their troubles in this game. Belcher loaded the bases in the first by giving up a single to Dave Henderson, hitting José Canseco, and walking Mark McGwire. Canseco was hit in the right biceps as he checked his swing and home plate umpire Doug Harvey awarded him first base. Dodgers manager Tommy Lasorda disputed this, thinking the ball hit Canseco's bat. Audio from the game seemed to confirm this, but replays showed the ball hit Canseco in the biceps.

Stewart's problems began in the bottom of the first when he purposely hit Steve Sax with his first pitch. After retiring Franklin Stubbs, Stewart balked Sax to second. Mickey Hatcher, Gibson's replacement who had hit only one homer all season, shocked the crowd by hitting a two-run shot off Stewart. Hatcher further excited the Dodger Stadium fans by running full speed around the bases. Commentator Joe Garagiola noted, "He ran in like they thought they were going to take it off the scoreboard! He really circled those bases in a hurry!" and "He's a Saturday Evening Post cover!"

Stewart calmed down and the Athletics provided him a lead in their half of the second. After allowing a leadoff single to Glenn Hubbard and striking out Walt Weiss, Belcher's control problems continued as he walked both Stewart and Carney Lansford to load the bases. After Dave Henderson struck out, Canseco crushed a 1–0 pitch for a grand slam to almost dead center, denting an NBC game camera in the process and giving the Athletics a 4–2 lead. Canseco's grand slam in Game 1 was his only hit of the series. His fellow Bash Brother Mark McGwire had only one hit as well: the game-winning shot that ended Game 3.

With one out in the sixth, the Dodgers broke Stewart's groove with three consecutive singles by Mike Marshall, John Shelby, and Mike Scioscia; Marshall scored. Stewart retired the next two batters to end the inning and strand Shelby in scoring position, but the Dodgers had cut the Athletics' lead to 4–3.

Unknown to the fans and media at the time, Kirk Gibson was watching the game on television while undergoing physical therapy in the Dodgers clubhouse. At some point during the game, television cameras scanned the Dodgers dugout and commentator Vin Scully, working for NBC for the 1988 postseason, observed that Gibson was "nowhere to be found". This spurred Gibson to call for Mitch Poole, the team ball boy, to set up the tee for him to take some warmup swings. After a few swings, Gibson told Poole to go get Lasorda for an evaluation; Lasorda presently appeared. Shortly thereafter, Gibson was seen in the dugout wearing his batting helmet. Along the way, NBC's Bob Costas could hear Gibson's agonized-sounding grunts after every hit.

Athletics closer Dennis Eckersley came on to pitch the ninth to close it out for Stewart. After retiring the first two batters (Mike Scioscia and Jeff Hamilton), Eckersley's former Athletics teammate Mike Davis, batting for Alfredo Griffin, walked on five pitches. During Davis' at-bat, Dave Anderson initially entered the on-deck circle to hit for Alejandro Peña. Eckersley pitched carefully to Davis because the A's remembered the home runs he hit for the Athletics a year earlier, not—as popularly believed—because the light-hitting Anderson was on deck. After Davis walked, Lasorda called back Anderson and sent a hobbled Kirk Gibson to the plate, amid cheers from the Dodger Stadium crowd. Gibson bravely fouled off Eckersley's best offerings, demonstrating how badly he was hurting. On one foul, Gibson hobbled towards first and prompted Scully to quip, "And it had to be an effort to run THAT far." After Gibson fouled off several pitches, Davis stole second on ball three. On the next pitch, the eighth of the at-bat, Gibson slammed a backdoor slider into the right-field bleachers to win the game. The footage of Gibson hobbling around the bases on both hurt legs and pumping his fist as he rounded second became an iconic baseball film highlight.

Gibson would never bat again in the Series, and his walk-off homer in Game 1 marked the first World Series game ended with a come-from-behind home run. Gibson's homerun was aided by Dodgers scout Mel Didier, who before the game told the team's left-handed hitters (Gibson included): “If Eckersley gets you at 3-2 and there’s a runner at second base or third base and it’s the tying or winning run, Eckersley will throw you a backdoor slider on 3-2.” Gibson and Davis worked Eckersley into that situation, and the next pitch was a backdoor slider that Gibson hit for the game winning homerun.

By the time Kirk Gibson reached his locker after Game 1, bullpen coach Mark Cresse had written "R. HOBBS" on a piece of paper and taped it over Gibson's nameplate, alluding to the walkoff homer by the fictional slugger played by Robert Redford in The Natural. Indeed, the next night, NBC replayed the home run, intercutting it with film and music of the Hobbs home run from the movie.

Game 1 is the only game in World Series history in which a grand slam-hitting team failed to win both the game and the series. (In 1956, the Yankees hit a grand slam and lost Game 2 but prevailed in the series; in 2025 the Blue Jays hit a grand slam and won Game 1 but lost the series).

Gibson's home run came 13 seasons after the previous World Series walk-off home run (Carlton Fisk's home run in Game 6 of the 1975 World Series), which remains the longest time between World Series walk-off home runs since the first one was hit in 1949. Five walk-off homers were hit in the following 13-season span (including the Mark McGwire home run later in the 1988 Series.)

Gibson became the second player to record a walk-off hit with two outs and his team trailing in the bottom of the ninth inning of a World Series game, following Cookie Lavagetto in the 1947 World Series. Only one other player, Brett Phillips in the 2020 World Series, has since accomplished this feat. This was the last Game 1 walk-off home run until 2023.

Game 1 was the first time the Dodgers won a game in the World Series after trailing through eight innings since Game 4 in 1947. This would happen again in Game 1 in 2024 (Freddie Freeman's walk-off home run is often compared to Gibson's) and Game 7 in 2025.

=== Game 2 ===
Sunday, October 16, 1988 5:25 pm (PT) at Dodger Stadium in Los Angeles, California 69 °F (21 °C), mostly clear
Team	1	2	3	4	5	6	7	8	9	R	H	E
Oakland	0	0	0	0	0	0	0	0	0	0	3	0
Los Angeles	0	0	5	1	0	0	0	0	X	6	10	1
WP: Orel Hershiser (1–0) LP: Storm Davis (0–1); Home runs: OAK: None; LAD: Mike Marshall (1)

With a rested Orel Hershiser on the mound, the Dodgers took a 2–0 Series lead. Hershiser went the distance, allowing only three singles, all three hit by Dave Parker. The Dodgers got to Oakland starter Storm Davis with a five-run third. After one-out singles by Hershiser and Steve Sax, consecutive RBI singles by Franklin Stubbs and Mickey Hatcher made it 2–0 Dodgers before Mike Marshall capped the scoring with a three-run home run. Hershiser himself got an RBI when Alfredo Griffin singled in the fourth and scored on his double. Hershiser was the first pitcher to get three hits in a World Series game since Art Nehf of the New York Giants in Game 1 of the 1924 World Series. He was also the first pitcher to record a World Series RBI since Philadelphia's John Denny in Game 4 of the 1983 World Series.

=== Game 3 ===
Tuesday, October 18, 1988 5:30 pm (PT) at Oakland–Alameda County Coliseum in Oakland, California 61 °F (16 °C), mostly clear
Team	1	2	3	4	5	6	7	8	9	R	H	E
Los Angeles	0	0	0	0	1	0	0	0	0	1	8	1
Oakland	0	0	1	0	0	0	0	0	1	2	5	0
WP: Rick Honeycutt (1–0) LP: Jay Howell (0–1); Home runs: LAD: None; OAK: Mark McGwire (1)

The Athletics got back in the series on the strength of strong pitching by former Dodger World Series hero Bob Welch and three relievers. Dodger starter John Tudor left during the second inning with tightness in his pitching shoulder and was relieved by Tim Leary who pitched the next 3 2/3 innings and Alejandro Peña who pitched an additional three innings.

Oakland struck first in the third when Glenn Hubbard singled, stole second, and came home on a single by Ron Hassey. The Dodgers tied it in the fifth when Franklin Stubbs drove home Jeff Hamilton with a double.

Oakland relievers helped squelch a Dodger threat in the sixth. Danny Heep led off with a double. John Shelby singled to left, but Heep was held up at third on the throw home as Shelby took second. Welch walked Mike Davis to load the bases, and left-hander Greg Cadaret was brought in to face lefty-hitting Mike Scioscia. Scioscia popped out to third. Oakland manager Tony La Russa then brought in right-hander Gene Nelson to face Hamilton, who forced Heep out at home. Alfredo Griffin grounded out to end the threat.

Reliever Rick Honeycutt held the Dodgers scoreless in two innings of work. The Athletics got their winning run in the bottom of the ninth when Mark McGwire deposited a one-out fastball from closer Jay Howell, who had struggled in the NLCS and also was suspended for illegally using pine tar, into the left-center field seats.

After Gibson's Game 1 home run ended the longest drought between two World Series walk-off home runs (12 years and 360 days), it took only three days for McGwire to hit the next one, which is the shortest amount of time between two such home runs. The 1988 World Series became and remains the only World Series to have multiple walk-off home runs as of 2026.

=== Game 4 ===
Wednesday, October 19, 1988 5:25 pm (PT) at Oakland–Alameda County Coliseum in Oakland, California 66 °F (19 °C), clear
Team	1	2	3	4	5	6	7	8	9	R	H	E
Los Angeles	2	0	1	0	0	0	1	0	0	4	8	1
Oakland	1	0	0	0	0	1	1	0	0	3	9	2
WP: Tim Belcher (1–0) LP: Dave Stewart (0–1) Sv: Jay Howell (1)

Without injured sluggers Kirk Gibson (25 HR) and Mike Marshall (20), the Dodgers started the game with what was statistically one of the weakest hitting World Series teams since the dead-ball era. During the regular season the Game 4 starting line up of Steve Sax (2B), Franklin Stubbs (1B), Mickey Hatcher (LF), Mike Davis (RF), John Shelby (CF), Danny Heep (DH), Jeff Hamilton (3B), Mike Scioscia (C) and Alfredo Griffin (SS) combined for a total of just 36 home runs. Only one player of the group had even ten home runs (Shelby). Between them, José Canseco and Mark McGwire had hit 74 home runs for Oakland. Canseco alone had hit more home runs (42) than the Dodger lineup while McGwire's 32 almost matched the Dodgers.

The Dodgers got two runs in the first when Steve Sax walked, went to third on a Mickey Hatcher single, and scored on a passed ball by Athletics catcher Terry Steinbach. Hatcher scored the second run on a groundout by John Shelby. Oakland got one back in their half when Luis Polonia led off with a single, went to second on a passed ball, and later scored on a José Canseco groundout.

Los Angeles went up 3–1 when Franklin Stubbs doubled and scored when Oakland shortstop Walt Weiss couldn't field a liner by Mike Davis (the play was ruled an error.) The Athletics answered in the sixth on an RBI single by Carney Lansford.

A key play came when the Dodgers got their final run in the seventh. With Alfredo Griffin on third and Steve Sax on first with one out, pinch-hitter Tracy Woodson hit what looked to be an inning-ending double play grounder. But Lasorda called for a hit-and-run play so Sax was going on the pitch. Oakland tried for the double play, but Sax barely beat the throw to second. So when the throw to first beat Woodson, it was only the second out, allowing Griffin to score.

The Oakland half of the seventh was also dramatic. With one out, Weiss singled and reached second when he was called safe on a double-play grounder hit by Polonia in a similar play to the Dodgers' scoring play in the top half of the inning; Weiss was running with the pitch. Dave Henderson cut the Dodger lead to 4–3 on a two-out RBI double. After Dodgers reliever Jay Howell entered the game, José Canseco walked and Dave Parker reached on a Griffin error to load the bases, but Game 3 hero Mark McGwire popped out, stranding three and ending the inning.

The Athletics managed to get singles in the eighth by Ron Hassey and in the ninth by Henderson, but Howell rebounded from his earlier postseason woes to stop both rallies, including striking out Canseco and inducing a foul pop out by Dave Parker in the ninth to strand the tying run at first and end the game. The Dodgers now held a commanding three games to one lead.

While hosting Game 4 on NBC, Bob Costas angered many members of the Dodgers (especially manager Tommy Lasorda) by commenting before the start of the game that the Dodgers quite possibly were about to put up the weakest-hitting lineup in World Series history. That comment ironically fired up the competitive spirit of the Dodgers. Later (while being interviewed by NBC's Marv Albert), after the Dodgers had won Game 4, Lasorda sarcastically suggested that the MVP of the 1988 World Series should be Bob Costas.

=== Game 5 ===
Thursday, October 20, 1988 5:39 pm (PT) at Oakland–Alameda County Coliseum in Oakland, California 66 °F (19 °C), clear
Team	1	2	3	4	5	6	7	8	9	R	H	E
Los Angeles	2	0	0	2	0	1	0	0	0	5	8	0
Oakland	0	0	1	0	0	0	0	1	0	2	4	0
WP: Orel Hershiser (2–0) LP: Storm Davis (0–2); Home runs: LAD: Mickey Hatcher (2), Mike Davis (1); OAK: None

Orel Hershiser capped one of the greatest seasons ever by a starting pitcher and one of the most improbable World Series wins in history by pitching a complete game, allowing only four hits, two runs, and striking out nine. Stan Javier had two RBIs with a single and a sac fly.

In addition to Hershiser's performance, the Dodgers won because Mickey Hatcher stepped in for the hobbled Kirk Gibson in left field and provided spark, enthusiasm, and unexpected offense. He hit his second home run in the Series off Oakland starter Storm Davis, a two-run shot, in the first inning; he had hit only one home run in the entire 1988 regular season.

Mike Davis, a disappointing free-agent signing for most of the 1988 season, added a two-run homerun in the fourth off Davis, and former World Series MVP Rick Dempsey, filling in for an injured Mike Scioscia, drove in Davis with an RBI double in the sixth.

The only drama of the game briefly arose in the 8th inning: after Javier's single brought the lead to 5–2, Hershiser walked Dave Henderson to bring the tying run to the plate in the form of 42-homer man José Canseco. Hershiser got him to pop out, and struck out Dave Parker to end the threat. He struck out Tony Phillips for the final out to give the Dodgers their first World Championship since 1981.

Oakland came into the World Series heavily favored, but the Dodgers out-hit (41–28 hits, .246–.177 batting average), out-muscled (5–2 homeruns), and out-pitched (2.03–3.92 earned run average) the seemingly unbeatable Oakland Athletics, improbably winning the Series in five games, outscoring the A's, 21–11, bringing the Dodgers their sixth World Series Championship, the second as a manager for Tommy Lasorda. Dodger pitching tamed Oakland stars José Canseco (one hit, his grand slam in Game 1) and Mark McGwire (one hit, his walk-off home run in Game 3) for all but their single homeruns the entire series.

The Dodgers became the first (and so far only) team to have a perfect game pitched against them and win a World Series in the same season. Tom Browning of the Cincinnati Reds pitched that perfect game on September 16, 1988.

With the Lakers winning their fifth NBA championship in nine years four months before, the Dodgers winning the World Series made Los Angeles the first city to have both NBA and World Series champions in the same year.

== Composite line score ==
1988 World Series (4–1): Los Angeles Dodgers (N.L.) over Oakland Athletics (A.L.)

Team	1	2	3	4	5	6	7	8	9	R	H	E
Los Angeles Dodgers	6	0	6	3	1	2	1	0	2	21	41	3
Oakland Athletics	1	4	2	0	0	1	1	1	1	11	28	2
Total attendance: 259,984 Average attendance: 51,997; Winning player's share: $108,665 Losing player's share: $86,221

== Television and radio coverage ==
The 1988 World Series marked the last time that NBC would televise a World Series for seven years. Beginning in 1990, NBC would be shut out of Major League Baseball coverage completely, after CBS signed a four-year, exclusive television contract. After splitting coverage of the 1995 World Series with ABC, NBC would next cover a World Series exclusively in 1997 and again in 1999. Beginning the following year, the fall classic would air exclusively on Fox (they had previously broadcast the 1996 and 1998 editions) where it has remained ever since.

Longtime Dodgers broadcaster Vin Scully called the World Series for NBC along with Joe Garagiola; this was the last World Series that Scully would call on television (although he would subsequently call several more on CBS Radio). It was also the final World Series broadcast on either medium, and the final NBC telecast, for Garagiola. When NBC returned from a commercial break at the start of the bottom of the ninth inning of Game 1, Scully stated (as NBC's cameras were panning the Dodgers' dugout) that Gibson (who wasn't in the dugout at the time) wouldn't play for sure. According to Gibson, who was watching the telecast in the Dodgers' clubhouse as the game started, Scully's comments in large part influenced his decision to want to bat.

As previously mentioned, Bob Costas, who along with Marv Albert, hosted NBC's World Series pregame coverage and handled postgame interviews made on-air statements that enraged many in the Dodgers' clubhouse (especially manager Tommy Lasorda). Costas said that the 1988 Dodgers possibly had the weakest hitting line-up in World Series history. After the Dodgers won Game 4, Lasorda (during a postgame interview with Marv Albert) sarcastically said that the MVP of the World Series should be Bob Costas.

On the radio side, Jack Buck and Bill White provided commentary for CBS Radio. This was Buck's sixth World Series call for CBS Radio and White's fifth. Game 5 was the final baseball broadcast for White, who had been calling games (primarily for the New York Yankees) since 1971; shortly after the World Series ended he replaced Bart Giamatti as president of the National League.

The Series was also broadcast by the teams' local flagship radio stations using their own announcers. In the San Francisco Bay Area, KSFO aired the games with Bill King and Lon Simmons announcing, while in Los Angeles, KABC aired the games with Ross Porter (substituting for Scully) and Don Drysdale announcing.

=== WMGT intrusion ===
During the second inning of Game 1, NBC affiliate WMGT-TV in Macon, Georgia, had its on-air feed hijacked by an unidentified technician who formerly worked for the station's video department. The video feed of the second inning was replaced by an unidentified black-and-white pornographic movie for ten seconds (which likely came from a subscription channel), while audio of Vin Scully was still presented throughout the incident. Following the investigation which led with authorities, the unidentified technician from WMGT was immediately fired from the station. The station's production manager, L.A. Sturdivant, released a statement explaining that the broadcast intrusion was triggered by accident rather than deliberately planned, and was being "treated as a serious matter."

After three days of investigation following the station's wiring at the control panel being rewired, Sturdivant replied that the fired technician may have accidentally flipped the wrong switch, which caused the World Series broadcast to switch from NBC's KU-Band signal over to the C-Band satellite signal that carried the X-rated material. During the final stages of investigating, local officials later put forth other theories that may led into the hijack such as a videotape having been brought into the studio and watched by the technician or deliberate sabotage from an outside prankster that would've explain the alternate case of the incident, but Sturdivant disagreed on its alternate theories.

== Aftermath ==
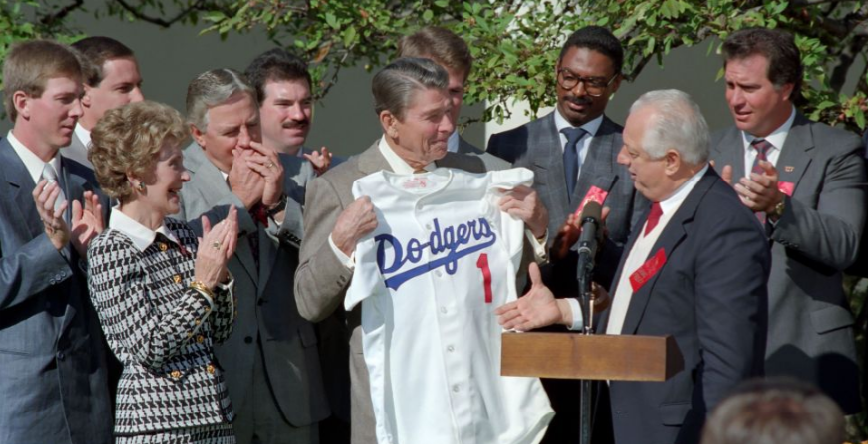
Tommy Lasorda giving President and former California governor Ronald Reagan a jersey

This was the last World Series that Peter Ueberroth presided over as commissioner. Incidentally, Ueberroth rose to prominence for organizing the 1984 Summer Olympic Games in Los Angeles.

The 1988 World Series was the first ever postseason series to have multiple walk-off home runs. This has since occurred in the 2004 NLCS, 2014 NLCS and 2019 ALCS; it has yet to happen in another World Series.

This would also be the last World Series to feature each league regular season Most Valuable Player until 2012.

Following this confrontation, both teams appeared on Family Feud with Ray Combs for a special sweeps week billed as a World Series Rematch.

The fate of Gibson's home run walk-off ball itself is unknown. According to Gibson, a woman sent him a picture of the bruise on her leg where the ball hit her, although no one has yet come forward with the ball. In fiction, a court struggle over the ownership of the ball was the primary plot of the June 29, 2011, episode of TNT legal drama Franklin & Bash.

1988 A's reliever Rick Honeycutt would later serve as the Dodgers pitching coach for 13 years (2006-2019). Honeycutt's 14 years as the Dodgers pitching coach (under four different managers) tied Ron Perranoski for the longest tenure in that role in the organization's history. A's star outfielder and Los Angeles native Mark McGwire was also a Dodgers' hitting coach from 2013-2015.

The Dodgers would not make another World Series appearance until 2017, where they would lose in seven games against the Houston Astros, who won their first World Series title. The Dodgers would make another World Series appearance the following year in 2018, but lost to the Boston Red Sox in five games, marking the first time the Dodgers lost back-to-back World Series since 1977 and 1978, where they lost both World Series to the New York Yankees. They would not win another World Series until 2020.

The A's made it to the World Series the next two years, winning the 1989 "Loma Prieta earthquake" series 4-0 vs. the San Francisco Giants and being swept by the Cincinnati Reds 4–0 in 1990. The A's haven't appeared in the World Series since. The closest the A's have gotten to the World Series since that time was in 1992, when they lost to the Toronto Blue Jays in the American League Championship Series in six games and 2006, when they lost to the Detroit Tigers in the ALCS in a four-game sweep.

Before the start of the 2018 season, the Dodgers commemorated the anniversary of Gibson's home run with the introduction of the “Kirk Gibson seat,” which is where his home run landed after winning Game 1 of the 1988 World Series. The seat in question was Section 302, Row D, Seat 1, though the Dodgers have renumbered that seat 88. The seat would be painted blue and signed by Gibson and the tickets cost $300, which includes a $200 donation to the Kirk Gibson Foundation to raise money and awareness for Parkinson’s research.

In Game 4 of the 2018 World Series between the Dodgers and the Red Sox, 30 years after Gibson's World Series walk-off home run, Dennis Eckersley (who was there covering the Red Sox as a NESN color commentator and analyst) and Kirk Gibson reunited for the ceremonial first pitch at Dodger Stadium and Gibson had a bat ready before catching Eckersley's pitch. In Game 3 of that series, Max Muncy would hit the Dodgers' first walk-off World Series home run since Gibson's in 1988 of Game 1.

The Dodgers' World Series capped off a spectacular decade of sports for the city of Los Angeles. Los Angeles hosted the aforementioned mentioned 1984 Summer Olympics, its first since hosting the 1932 Summer Olympics. In terms of team sports, the Showtime Lakers won five NBA championships in the decade (including one in 1988, just a day under four months before the Dodgers victory), the Raiders moved from Oakland to Los Angeles and won the city's first Super Bowl, and the Los Angeles Kings traded for Wayne Gretzky in August 1988, who was even at that time considered the greatest hockey player ever. For their part, the Dodgers were the only team to win more than one World Series in the 1980s. The next Los Angeles championship did not come until the 2000 Lakers. 32 years later in 2020, the Dodgers and Lakers would again win a World Series and NBA Finals in the same season.

This would be the final World Series Vin Scully called on either television or radio that featured the Los Angeles Dodgers. Scully would call World Series games on CBS radio until 1997. The next time the Dodgers advanced to the World Series (2017), Charley Steiner was now the radio play-by-play announcer and went on to call Los Angeles's victory over Tampa Bay in 2020 (Scully had retired from broadcasting after the 2016 season).

Freddie Freeman's grand slam off the New York Yankees' Nestor Cortés Jr. to win Game 1 of the 2024 World Series for the Dodgers—the first walk-off grand slam in World Series history—was widely compared to Gibson's home run. Like Gibson, Freeman was playing through injury (a badly sprained ankle in Freeman's case), and both players also came to bat with the Dodgers trailing by a run and down to their last out in Game 1 of the World Series. Broadcaster Joe Davis' call on Fox's national broadcast of "...she is gone!" echoed Scully's call for the Gibson homer, and Davis also added, "Gibby, meet Freddie!" Both Gibson's and Freeman's home runs were to right field at Dodger Stadium, in almost the same spot, and both came at 8:37 p.m. Pacific Time. Finally, just like 1988, the Dodgers would end up winning the series in 5 games. On opening day for the Dodgers in 2025, Gibson threw out the ceremonial first pitch to Freeman, bringing Davis' call full circle.

== Quotes ==
And look who's coming up... All year long, they looked to him to light the fire, and all year long he answered the demands, until he was physically unable to start tonight, with two bad legs!... And with two out, you talk about the roll of the dice, this is it!... So the Dodgers trying to catch lightning right now!

— Vin Scully on NBC-TV as Kirk Gibson comes up to bat in game 1

High fly ball into right field... SHE IS GONE!!

— Scully calling Gibson's home run on NBC-TV

In a year that has been so improbable, the impossible has happened!

— Scully's comments after Gibson's home run

Hey, look at the way he's limping! That's impossible for him to come out and bat, isn't it?

— Jack Buck with Bill White on CBS Radio when Gibson comes to bat

We have a big 3-2 pitch coming here from Eckersley. Gibson swings, and a fly ball to deep right field! THIS IS GONNA BE A HOME RUN!! UNBELIEVABLE!!! A HOME RUN FOR GIBSON!! And the Dodgers have won the game, 5 to 4! I DON'T BELIEVE WHAT I JUST SAW!! I don't believe what I just saw!! Is this really happening, Bill?...One of the most remarkable finishes to any World Series game: a one-handed home run by Kirk Gibson!...I have seen a lot of dramatic finishes in a lot of sports, but this one might top almost every other one!

— Buck calling Gibson home run on CBS Radio

Nobody thought we could win the division. Nobody thought we could beat the mighty Mets. Nobody thought we could beat the team who won 104 games, but we believed it!

— Tommy Lasorda's postgame victory speech after game 5

== See also ==
- 1988 Japan Series
- Kirk Gibson's 1998 World Series home run
