= Mickey Hatcher =

American baseball player and coach (born 1955)

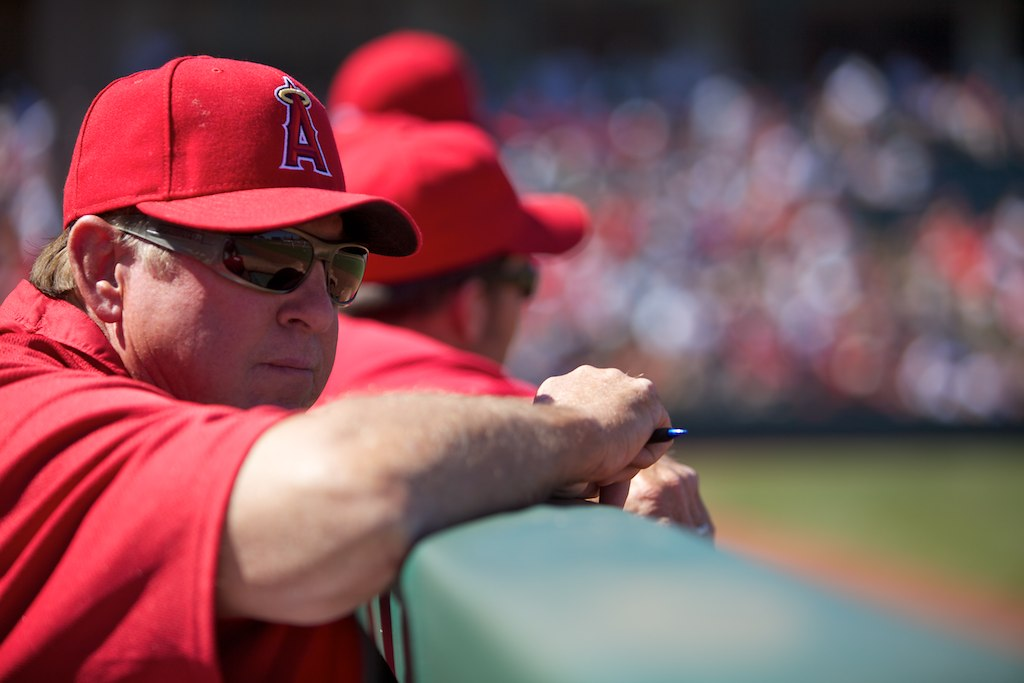
- Hatcher with the Los Angeles Angels of Anaheim
- Outfielder / First baseman / Third baseman
- Born: March 15, 1955 (age 71); Cleveland, Ohio, U.S.
- Batted: Right Threw: Right

MLB debut
- August 3, 1979, for the Los Angeles Dodgers

Last MLB appearance
- October 3, 1990, for the Los Angeles Dodgers

MLB statistics
- Batting average: .280
- Home runs: 38
- Runs batted in: 375
- Stats at Baseball Reference

Teams
- As player: Los Angeles Dodgers (1979–1980); Minnesota Twins (1981–1986); Los Angeles Dodgers (1987–1990); As coach: Texas Rangers (1993–1994); Anaheim Angels / Los Angeles Angels of Anaheim (2000–2012)

Career highlights and awards
- 2× World Series champion (1988, 2002)

Michael Vaughn Hatcher (born March 15, 1955) is an American former professional baseball player and coach. He played in Major League Baseball as an outfielder, third baseman and first baseman from 1979 through 1990, most notably as a member of the Los Angeles Dodgers when he replaced an injured Kirk Gibson in the 1988 World Series and hit .368 (7/19) with two home runs and five RBI to help the Dodgers win the world championship.

== Early life ==
Hatcher was born in Cleveland, Ohio, and is a graduate of Mesa High School in Mesa, Arizona.

== Playing career ==
After playing high school baseball for Mesa High School, Hatcher attended Mesa Community College where he was named All-American twice in both football and baseball. His football jersey #81 was later retired. After starring at the community college level, he attended the University of Oklahoma, where he played both football and baseball and played as wide receiver in the 1976 Fiesta Bowl.

Hatcher was drafted twice (in 1974 in the 12th round by the Houston Astros and in 1976 in the 2nd round by the New York Mets) before signing with the Dodgers in 1977 (after being selected in the 5th round of the June draft). After signing, Hatcher was assigned as an outfielder to the Clinton Dodgers in the Class A Midwest League. The following season, Hatcher spent time playing for both San Antonio in the Class AA Texas League and AAA Albuquerque. Both stops would see him split time between the outfield and third base – presaging his major league career in which he would see time not only at all three outfield positions, but also first and third base.

After hitting .371 with 10 home runs, 93 RBI, and 88 runs for Albuquerque, Hatcher made his major league debut on August 3, 1979 subbing in for Ron Cey at 3B. Hatcher was credited with an RBI after taking a bases-loaded walk in the 7th inning. Hatcher would hit .269 in 33 games for the Dodgers in 1979. Hatcher would start the 1980 season knocking around AAA pitching (hitting .359 in 43 games) before again being called up to the parent club. Hatcher would only hit .226 for the Dodgers and despite averaging well over .350 in the minors, his major league stats to date were 2 HR, 10 RBI, 13 runs, and a .249 batting average in 179 plate appearances.

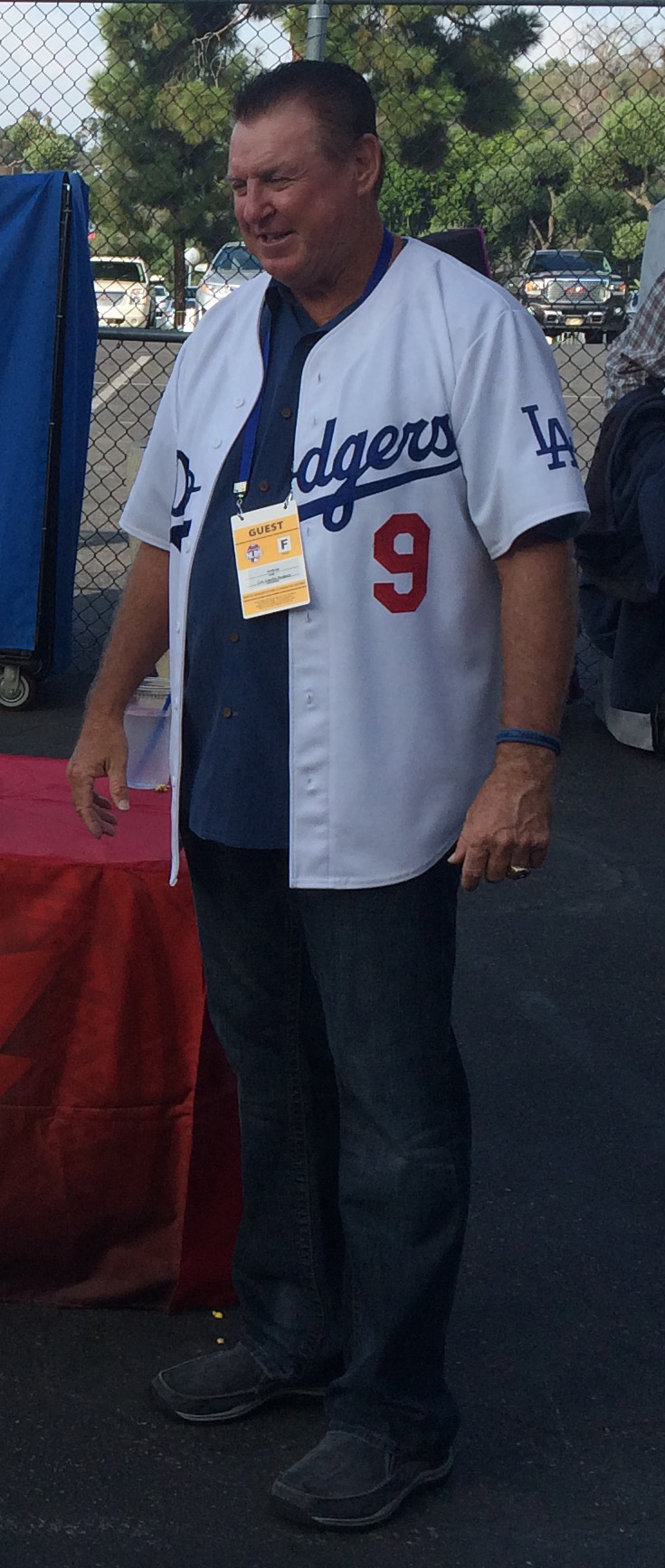
Hatcher before Dodgers playoff game

On March 30, 1981, the Dodgers traded Hatcher and two minor leaguers to the Minnesota Twins for veteran outfielder Ken Landreaux. He played with the Twins from 1981 to 1986, hitting .284 in 672 games and then returned to the Dodgers as a free agent on April 10, 1987.

Hatcher is admired for his fun-loving approach to playing baseball, particularly on the World Champion 1988 Dodger team, and was featured in various presentations to the tune of the "Mickey Mouse Club" song. He would sprint to first base after drawing walks, like Pete Rose, and garnered a lot of media attention in the 1988 World Series by hitting a first-inning home run in Game 1 and sprinting full-speed around the bases instead of jogging. This prompted NBC broadcaster Joe Garagiola to say "He's the cover of The Saturday Evening Post!" and "He's running like he's afraid they're going to take it off the board!" Hatcher had only hit one home run in that 1988 season, but hit two in the World Series.

Hatcher was famously portrayed on 1986 Fleer and 1991 Upper Deck baseball cards with his "giant glove."

He remained with the Dodgers through 1991, spending his last season back in AAA, before retiring.

== Coaching career ==
Following his playing days, Hatcher was a coach for the Texas Rangers in 1993 and 1994, the manager of the Rookie League Great Falls Dodgers in 1996 and 1997 and began 1998 as the manager of the Single-A San Bernardino Stampede before becoming the hitting coach for the Dodgers in mid-season. In 2000, he became the hitting coach for the Los Angeles Angels, under manager Mike Scioscia, Hatcher's teammate from the 1988 World Championship team. He was fired by the Angels on May 15, 2012, after the team started the season 16-21.

The Dodgers hired Hatcher in June as a special assistant to the general manager. Hatcher's position was not renewed in 2013.
