= Mel Didier =

American baseball player, scout manager and executive

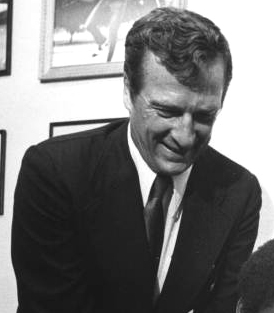
- Didier in 1973
- Pitcher / Scout
- Born: June 25, 1926; Marksville, Louisiana, U.S.
- Died: September 10, 2017 (aged 91); Phoenix, Arizona, U.S.
- Batted: Right Threw: Right

Melvin Joffrion Didier Sr. (June 25, 1926 – September 10, 2017) was an American professional baseball pitcher in Minor League Baseball for two years (1948-49). However, he spent more than 60 years in pro ball as a scout and executive.

== Biography ==
Born in Marksville, Louisiana, Didier was raised in Baton Rouge, Louisiana. He attended Louisiana State University (LSU) where he played both football and baseball for the Tigers. His career covered a wide array of involvement in athletics for over 70 years from starting his career as a football and baseball coach at his alma mater, Catholic High School in Baton Rouge, to a football assistants' job at LSU. Didier moved to professional baseball as both a scout and later as a front office executive for three expansion clubs.

Didier pitched in 1948 for the Stroudsburg Poconos and in 1949 for the Thomasville Tigers, ending his career with an 11–15 win–loss record and a 6.33 earned run average (ERA) in his two-year career. A shoulder injury ended his playing days with the Detroit Tigers organization but not his association with the game.

When the expansion Montreal Expos began in 1969, Didier was hired as director of scouting and player development, a position that he held until September 1975. During his time at Montreal, he was responsible for the signings of future Baseball Hall of Famers Gary Carter (1972) and Andre Dawson (1975).

Didier was the running backs/freshman coach at his alma mater, LSU, when the expansion Expos hired him to oversee their player development. He was the director of player development for the Seattle Mariners from 1977 to 1978, after which he joined the Cleveland Indians. He was the baseball coach at the University of Southwestern Louisiana from 1981 to 1982, also serving as its athletic director in 1982.

Didier then became a scout for the Los Angeles Dodgers, whom he convinced to acquire free agent Kirk Gibson in 1988. As a result, he gained fame for his scouting report on Oakland Athletics ace relief pitcher Dennis Eckersley, which Gibson credited for his dramatic 1988 World Series Game One-winning pinch-hit home run against Eckersley; the Dodgers would go on to win the series in five games.

Didier joined the expansion Arizona Diamondbacks in December 1996 and served with them through October 2000. He then served a second stint in Cleveland, followed by a year with the Baltimore Orioles. After that, he worked for the Texas Rangers as a special assignments scout. In October 2009, he joined the Toronto Blue Jays, whom he served until his death.

In 2003, Didier gained induction into the Louisiana Sports Hall of Fame. Then in 2014, Aquila Productions made the documentary, Scout's Honor: The Mel Didier Story," which baseball greats, including Gibson, talk about Didier's influence on the game.

His son Bob was a catcher in the Major Leagues from 1969 through 1974, and later had a long post-playing career as a coach, scout and minor league manager.

Didier died on September 10, 2017, in his home in Phoenix, Arizona, at the age of 91.
