= Jeff Hamilton (baseball) =

American baseball player (born 1964)

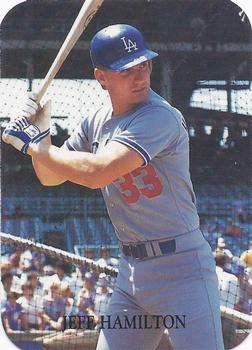
- Third baseman
- Born: March 19, 1964 (age 62); Flint, Michigan, U.S.
- Batted: Right Threw: Right

MLB debut
- June 28, 1986, for the Los Angeles Dodgers

Last MLB appearance
- September 28, 1991, for the Los Angeles Dodgers

MLB statistics
- Batting average: .234
- Home runs: 24
- Runs batted in: 124
- Stats at Baseball Reference

Teams
- Los Angeles Dodgers (1986–1991)

Career highlights and awards
- World Series champion (1988)

Jeffrey Robert Hamilton (born March 19, 1964) is an American former Major League Baseball third baseman.

Selected in the 29th round of the June 1982 MLB Amateur Draft, Hamilton eventually saw success as a member of the Pacific Coast League Albuquerque Dukes, batting over .320 over the course of two seasons before being called up to make his Major League Baseball debut on June 28, 1986. He was called up several times thereafter before becoming the Dodgers' full-time Third Baseman at the start of the 1989 season. Hamilton graduated from Carman-Ainsworth High School.

After a successful 1989 campaign, Hamilton began 1990 as the Dodgers starting third basemen. But after playing with a sore shoulder in spring training, Hamilton was shelved in early April after it was discovered he had torn his rotator cuff - which eventually required season-ending surgery. Hamilton ended up only playing in 7 games for the entire 1990 season.

Hamilton played portions of six seasons during his career, all with the Los Angeles Dodgers. Hamilton was a member of the Dodgers team that won the World Series in 1988 and appeared with Orel Hershiser and Rick Dempsey on the cover of the October 31, 1988, issue of Sports Illustrated. In 1989, he was sixth in the National League in doubles, with 35, and led the NL in putouts by a third baseman, with 139. He played his final MLB game on September 28, 1991, later retiring after a short return to the Albuquerque Dukes in 1992.

Although he was a position player throughout his entire career, he did appear in a ballgame in 1989 as a relief pitcher during a 22-inning ballgame against the Houston Astros. He was credited as the losing pitcher of that ballgame. He struck out Billy Hatcher and Ken Caminiti before giving up the game-winning hit to Rafael Ramirez. The game, which lasted over 7 hours was the longest in Houston Astros history.
