= Mike Davis (baseball) =

American baseball player (born 1959)

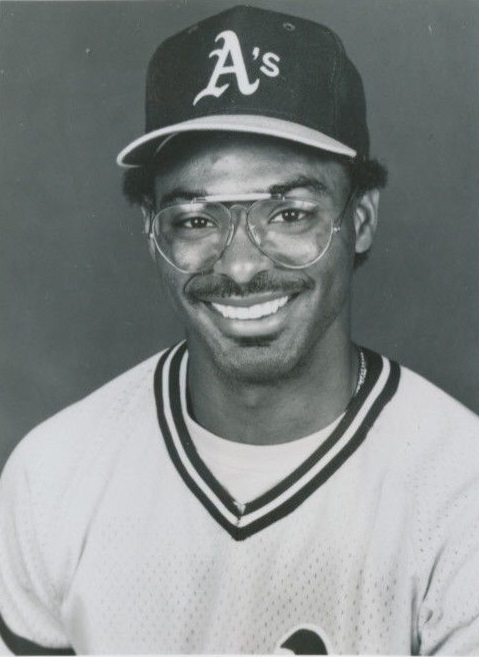
- Right fielder
- Born: June 11, 1959 (age 67); San Diego, California, U.S.
- Batted: Left Threw: Left

MLB debut
- April 10, 1980, for the Oakland Athletics

Last MLB appearance
- October 1, 1989, for the Los Angeles Dodgers

MLB statistics
- Batting average: .259
- Home runs: 91
- Runs batted in: 371
- Stats at Baseball Reference

Teams
- Oakland Athletics (1980–1987); Los Angeles Dodgers (1988–1989)

Career highlights and awards
- World Series champion (1988)

Michael Dwayne Davis (born June 11, 1959) is an American former professional baseball right fielder. He played 10 seasons in Major League Baseball (MLB) from 1980 to 1989 for the Oakland Athletics and Los Angeles Dodgers. He was selected by the Athletics in the third round of the 1977 Major League Baseball draft and signed as a free agent with the Dodgers before the 1988 season. He is most remembered as the Dodger who earned a two-out walk in the bottom of the ninth of Game 1 of the 1988 World Series, stole second base, and ultimately scored on Kirk Gibson's walk-off home run that won the game. The Dodgers would go on to win the series, four games to one.

Drafted out of Hoover High School in San Diego in 1977, Davis debuted for the Athletics in 1980 and played eight seasons for the team. From 1985 to 1987, his three best statistical seasons, he hit 65 home runs, collected 209 RBI's, and hit for a .274 average. He signed with the Los Angeles Dodgers after the 1987 season.

In 1988, Davis fought through an injury in spring training and largely struggled in his first National League season, hitting .196 with only two home runs and 17 runs batted in.

In Game 1 of that season's World Series, Davis was called upon to pinch hit against his former team with two outs in the ninth inning and the Dodgers trailing, 4-3. He faced A's closer Dennis Eckersley, who led the league in saves that year. After throwing a first-pitch strike, Eckersley pitched carefully around his former teammate, which he later attributed in part due to Davis' power-hitting when they were teammates the year prior. With light-hitting Dave Anderson in the on deck circle, he threw the next four pitches well outside to walk Davis. Anderson was then pulled for pinch hitter Kirk Gibson, the Dodgers' best offensive weapon during the year but severely hobbled with injuries to both legs. With the count 2-2 to Gibson, Davis stole second base easily on a pitch outside the zone; controversy nearly ensued when Ron Hassey grazed an off-balance Gibson in his throwing motion to second base, but he did not make the throw, and interference was not called. On the next pitch, Gibson hit a now-famous home run to give the Dodgers a 5-4 win. In post-game interviews, Gibson credited Davis' steal for changing his approach to just seeking a base hit.

In the fourth inning of Game 5, he launched a two-run homer off Storm Davis on a 3-0 pitch to give the Dodgers a 4-1 lead. The Dodgers would go on to win 5-2 to clinch the series; Davis' homer provided the decisive runs in the game. It was his only hit of the series, but he also walked four times, stole two bases, and scored three runs, finishing with a .455 on-base percentage. He retired after the 1989 season.

Davis served as the manager of the California High School baseball varsity team in San Ramon, California, for the 1993 season. He later served as hitting coach for the Everett Aquasox, Class-A short season affiliate of the Seattle Mariners, in 2014, and the same role for the Clinton LumberKings, another Mariners affiliate, for the 2015 season.
