= Kirk Gibson =

American baseball player, broadcaster, and manager (born 1957)

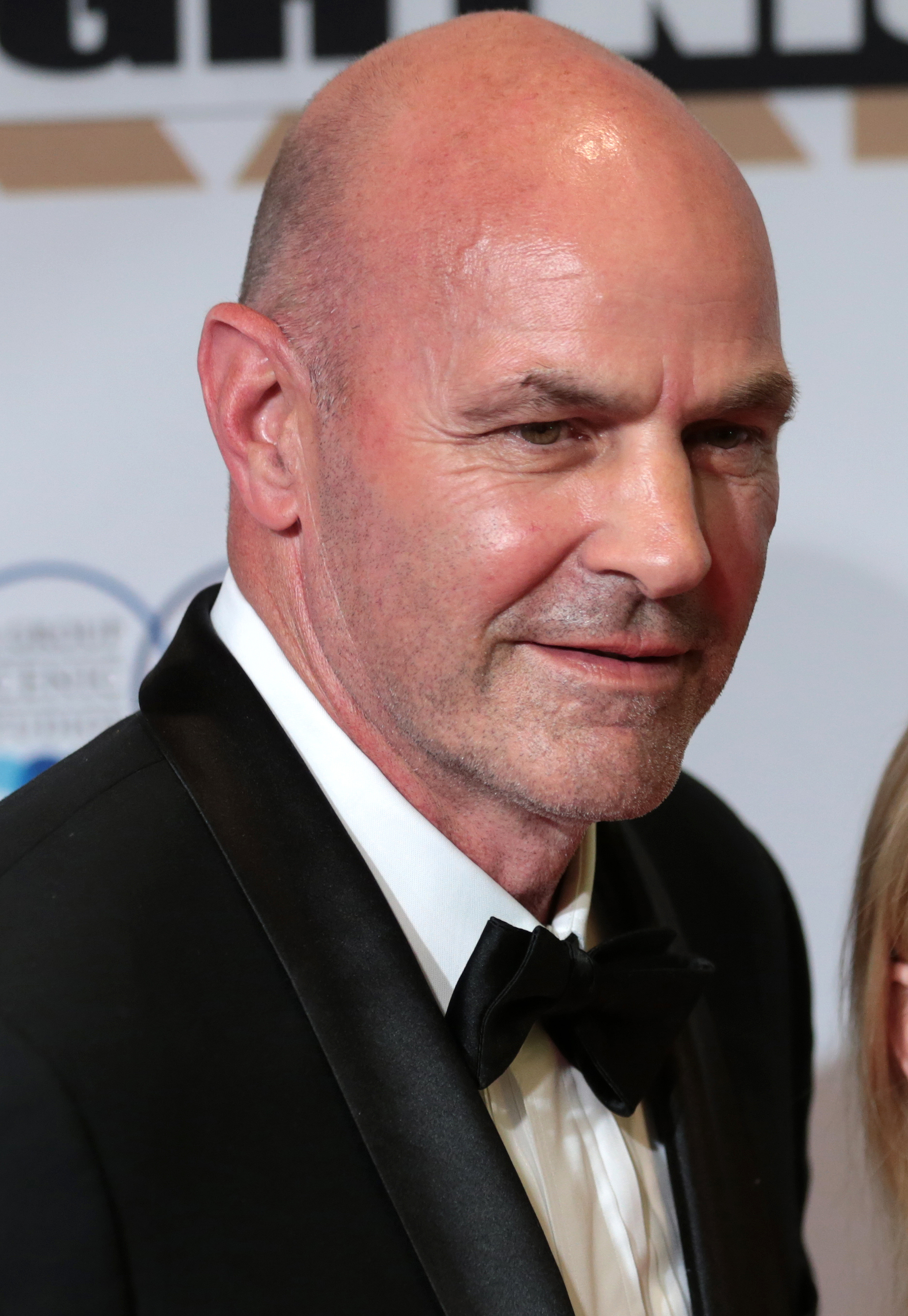
- Gibson in 2017
- Outfielder / Manager
- Born: May 28, 1957 (age 69); Pontiac, Michigan, U.S.
- Batted: Left Threw: Left

MLB debut
- September 8, 1979, for the Detroit Tigers

Last MLB appearance
- August 10, 1995, for the Detroit Tigers

MLB statistics
- Batting average: .268
- Home runs: 255
- Runs batted in: 870
- Managerial record: 353–375
- Winning %: .485
- Stats at Baseball Reference
- Managerial record at Baseball Reference

Teams
- As player: Detroit Tigers (1979–1987); Los Angeles Dodgers (1988–1990); Kansas City Royals (1991); Pittsburgh Pirates (1992); Detroit Tigers (1993–1995); As manager: Arizona Diamondbacks (2010–2014); As coach: Detroit Tigers (2003–2005); Arizona Diamondbacks (2007–2010)

Career highlights and awards
- 2× World Series champion (1984, 1988); NL MVP (1988); ALCS MVP (1984); Silver Slugger Award (1988); NL Manager of the Year (2011); Legend of Dodger Baseball

Kirk Harold Gibson (born May 28, 1957) is an American former professional baseball outfielder and manager. Gibson spent most of his career in Major League Baseball (MLB) with the Detroit Tigers, but also played for the Los Angeles Dodgers, Kansas City Royals, and Pittsburgh Pirates. He batted and threw left-handed. He is currently a special assistant for the Tigers.

While with the Dodgers, Gibson was named the National League MVP in 1988. During his career, he hit two dramatic home runs in the World Series, each one coming against an eventual Hall of Fame relief pitcher. With the Tigers in 1984, he clinched the title in Game 5 with a three-run homer off Goose Gossage, who had refused to walk him with a base open. With the Dodgers in 1988, Gibson faced closer Dennis Eckersley in the ninth inning of the first game and hit a pinch-hit walk-off home run—often described as one of the most exciting moments in World Series history. He was named to the All-Star team twice as a reserve, in 1985 and 1988, but declined the invitation both times.

Following his retirement as a player, he spent five seasons as a television analyst in Detroit and then became a coach for the Tigers in 2003. He became the Diamondbacks' bench coach in 2007 and was promoted to interim manager in 2010 following the mid-season dismissal of A. J. Hinch. On October 4, 2010, the Diamondbacks removed the "interim" label, naming Gibson their manager for the 2011 season. He served as the Diamondbacks' manager until September 26, 2014. Gibson returned to the broadcast booth in 2015 as a part-time commentator for Tigers TV broadcasts, and was named a regular television analyst for the Tigers in 2019.

== Biography ==
=== Early life and collegiate career ===
Gibson was born in Pontiac, Michigan, on May 28, 1957, and grew up in nearby Waterford. Gibson graduated from Waterford Kettering High School in 1975, and attended Michigan State University, where he was an All-American wide receiver for the Michigan State Spartans football team. Gibson led the Spartans to a tie for the Big Ten Conference title, setting school and conference receiving records, starring in the Hula Bowl and Senior Bowl, and making several All-America teams. For his accomplishments on the football field, Gibson was elected to the College Football Hall of Fame in January 2017.

At the suggestion of Spartan football coach Darryl Rogers, Gibson played college baseball for the Michigan State Spartans baseball team. Gibson played only one year of college baseball, and batted .390 with 16 home runs and 52 runs batted in (RBIs) in 48 games.

=== Detroit Tigers ===
1983 All-Star Game program insert of Gibson for Detroit Tigers

The Detroit Tigers selected Gibson in the first round of the 1978 Major League Baseball draft and the St. Louis Cardinals selected him in the seventh round of the 1979 NFL draft. He chose to sign with his hometown Tigers.

Gibson made his major league debut in 1979 and played as the regular right fielder for the Tigers from 1983 to 1987. He helped the Tigers win the 1984 World Series. He became a free agent after the 1985 season but received no significant offers because of what was later determined to be collusion among the owners of MLB teams. He re-signed with the Tigers and in 1987, helped them to win the American League East by two games over the Blue Jays in an enthralling divisional race. However, Detroit lost the 1987 American League Championship Series to the eventual World Champion Twins.

Early in his career, Gibson was proclaimed by manager Sparky Anderson to be the next Mickey Mantle. Anderson later apologized and said that probably put too much pressure on a young and inexperienced Gibson. Nevertheless, Gibson was considered a versatile power/speed player in the 1980s who was able to hit home runs as well as steal bases. He finished in the top 10 in home runs 3 times in his career and ranked in the top 10 in stolen bases four times. He fell one home run short of becoming the first Tiger in the 30–30 club in 1985.

Gibson was known for hitting clutch home runs. In the eighth inning of Game 5 of the 1984 World Series between the Tigers and Padres, he faced Goose Gossage, one of the game's premier relievers, with Detroit up 5–4 and runners on second and third with one out. An intentional (or at least semi-intentional) walk seemed to be in order, especially because Gibson had already homered earlier in the game. However, Gossage told San Diego manager Dick Williams he thought he could strike him out. Indeed, Gossage had struck out Gibson in his very first Major League at-bat in 1979 on three pitches, and Gibson had only managed one bunt-single against Gossage in 10 previous plate appearances. When asked about Gibson, Gossage later said he had told teammate Tim Lollar in the second inning, "I own him." If the Padres could hold the Tigers and score a couple runs in the ninth, they would force the Series back to San Diego and maybe turn the tide. In the Sounds of the Game video, Detroit manager Sparky Anderson was seen yelling at Gibson from the dugout, "He don't want to walk you!", showing four fingers and then making a bat-swinging motion, the universal baseball gesture for "swing away." Gibson got the message and launched Gossage's 1–0 fastball deep into Tiger Stadium's right field upper deck for a three-run homer, icing the game and the Series for the Tigers.

During his 2008 Hall of Fame induction speech, Gossage turned to Williams and said with a smile, "I should have walked Gibson." In the ESPN interview that aired after the induction ceremony, Williams took responsibility for the situation, as he allowed Gossage to talk him into pitching to Gibson. At the same time, Williams ribbed Gossage that Gibson's home run damaged several seats "in consecutive rows".

=== Los Angeles Dodgers ===
In 1988, an arbitrator ruled that baseball team owners had colluded against the players in an effort to stem free agency. He granted several players, including Gibson, immediate free agency. Gibson signed with the Los Angeles Dodgers.

Gibson joined the Dodgers in 1988, and immediately brought a winning attitude after a publicized blow-up when pitcher Jesse Orosco put shoe black in his cap during a spring training prank. Gibson openly criticized the team, which had finished fourth in the NL West the previous season, for its unprofessionalism. He became the team's de facto leader, and won a controversial NL MVP award after batting .290 with 25 home runs, 76 RBIs, 106 runs, and 31 stolen bases. While he didn't lead the league in any major category, the intensity and leadership he brought to an increasingly successful team likely won him the award over players with more impressive statistics. (MVP runner-up Darryl Strawberry of the New York Mets, for example, led the NL with 39 home runs that season.)

In the 1988 National League Championship Series against the New York Mets, Gibson made an improbable catch in left field at a rain-soaked Shea Stadium in Game 3. Racing back, he slipped on the wet grass and, while on his way down with his knees on the ground and the rest of his body suspended, reached out and made a full extension catch to save a potential Mookie Wilson double; however, the Dodgers lost the game 8–4. In Game 4, his solo home run in the top of the 12th proved to be the winning hit. In Game 5, he hit a two-out three-run homer in the fifth; the Dodgers ended up winning the game 7–4. Nonetheless, his LCS heroics served as but a prelude to the career-defining moment that awaited him in the subsequent World Series.

==== 1988 World Series ====
Gibson is perhaps best known for his one and only plate appearance in the 1988 World Series against the Oakland Athletics. Having injured both legs during the NLCS, Gibson was not expected to play at all. In Game 1, however, with the Dodgers trailing by a score of 4–3, Mike Davis on first base, and two out in the ninth inning, manager Tommy Lasorda unexpectedly inserted his hobbled league MVP as a pinch hitter. Gibson, limping back and forth between a pulled left hamstring and a swollen right knee, made his way to the plate to face Oakland's future Hall of Fame closer Dennis Eckersley. Gibson quickly got behind in the count 0–2, but laid off of a pair of outside pitches that were called balls. He then kept the count at 2–2 by fouling off a pitch. On the seventh pitch of his at-bat, a ball, Davis stole second. With an awkward, almost casual swing, Gibson used pure upper-body strength—and according to Gibson, advanced scouting-based knowledge of what the pitcher would likely throw with that count—to smack a 3–2 backdoor slider over the right-field fence. He hobbled around the bases and pumped his right fist as his jubilant teammates stormed the field. The Dodgers won the game, 5–4, and won the World Series, four games to one.

=== Later career ===
In 1991, Gibson signed as a free agent with the Kansas City Royals, and then in 1992 he was traded to the Pittsburgh Pirates for Neal Heaton. He retired from baseball temporarily, after being released by the Pirates on May 5, 1992. A month later, Gibson got an offer to return to Detroit—not with the Tigers, but to play football again, with the Arena Football League's Detroit Drive; he declined the offer. The following spring, Sparky Anderson convinced him to return to baseball. He spent the final three years of his career (1993–1995) back with the Tigers, including a renaissance season in 1994 when he hit 23 home runs in 98 games before the strike ended the season.

=== Career statistics ===
In 1,635 games over 17 seasons, Gibson posted a .268 batting average (1,553 for 5,798) with 985 runs, 260 doubles, 54 triples, 255 home runs, 870 RBI, 284 stolen bases, 718 bases on balls, a .352 on-base percentage and a .463 slugging percentage. Defensively, he recorded a .976 fielding percentage while playing at all three outfield positions. In 21 postseason games, he batted .282 (22 for 78) with 13 runs, two doubles, seven home runs, 21 RBI, nine stolen bases and 12 walks.

=== Post-playing career ===
==== Broadcasting ====
Gibson was a Detroit Tigers television analyst on FSN Detroit for five seasons, from 1998 to 2002.

On February 10, 2015, it was announced that Gibson would return as a color commentator for the Detroit Tigers on Fox Sports Detroit, along with former teammate Jack Morris.

On January 28, 2019, Gibson was named a special assistant for the Detroit Tigers.

==== Coaching ====
In 2003, he was named the Tigers' bench coach by new Tigers manager and former Tigers teammate Alan Trammell. He served in that position until the midway point of the 2005 season when he was moved from bench coach to hitting coach, swapping positions with Bruce Fields. As of the start of the 2007 Major League Baseball season, Gibson became the new Arizona Diamondbacks bench coach.

Gibson had worn #23 as a player in both football at Michigan State and baseball throughout his career. However, while coaching for the Tigers, he wore #22 after #23 was retired for Willie Horton. Gibson wore #23 as manager of the Arizona Diamondbacks.

=== Managerial career ===
==== Arizona Diamondbacks ====
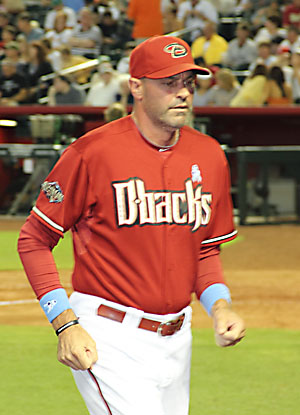
Gibson, Chase Field, 2011

On July 1, 2010, the Arizona Diamondbacks fired A. J. Hinch as manager and promoted Gibson from his position as bench coach to interim manager. Shortly after the season, Gibson was named permanent manager and given a two-year contract. In his first full year as manager, Gibson led the Diamondbacks to their first N.L. West title since 2007, when most sports writers expected them to be in last place for the third time in a row. He was named NL Manager of the Year on November 16, 2011. On September 26, 2014, the Arizona Diamondbacks fired Gibson, ending his four-year tenure with the team. He finished his Diamondbacks career with a 353–375 regular season and 2–3 post–season record.

==== Managerial record ====
Team	Year	Regular season					Postseason			
Team	Year	Games	Won	Lost	Win %	Finish	Won	Lost	Win %	Result
ARI	2010	83	34	49	.410	5th in NL West	–	–	–	–
ARI	2011	162	94	68	.580	1st in NL West	2	3	.400	Lost NLDS (MIL)
ARI	2012	162	81	81	.500	3rd in NL West	–	–	–	–
ARI	2013	162	81	81	.500	2nd in NL West	–	–	–	–
ARI	2014	159	63	96	.396	(fired)	–	–	–	–
Total		728	353	375	.485		2	3	.400	

== Personal life ==
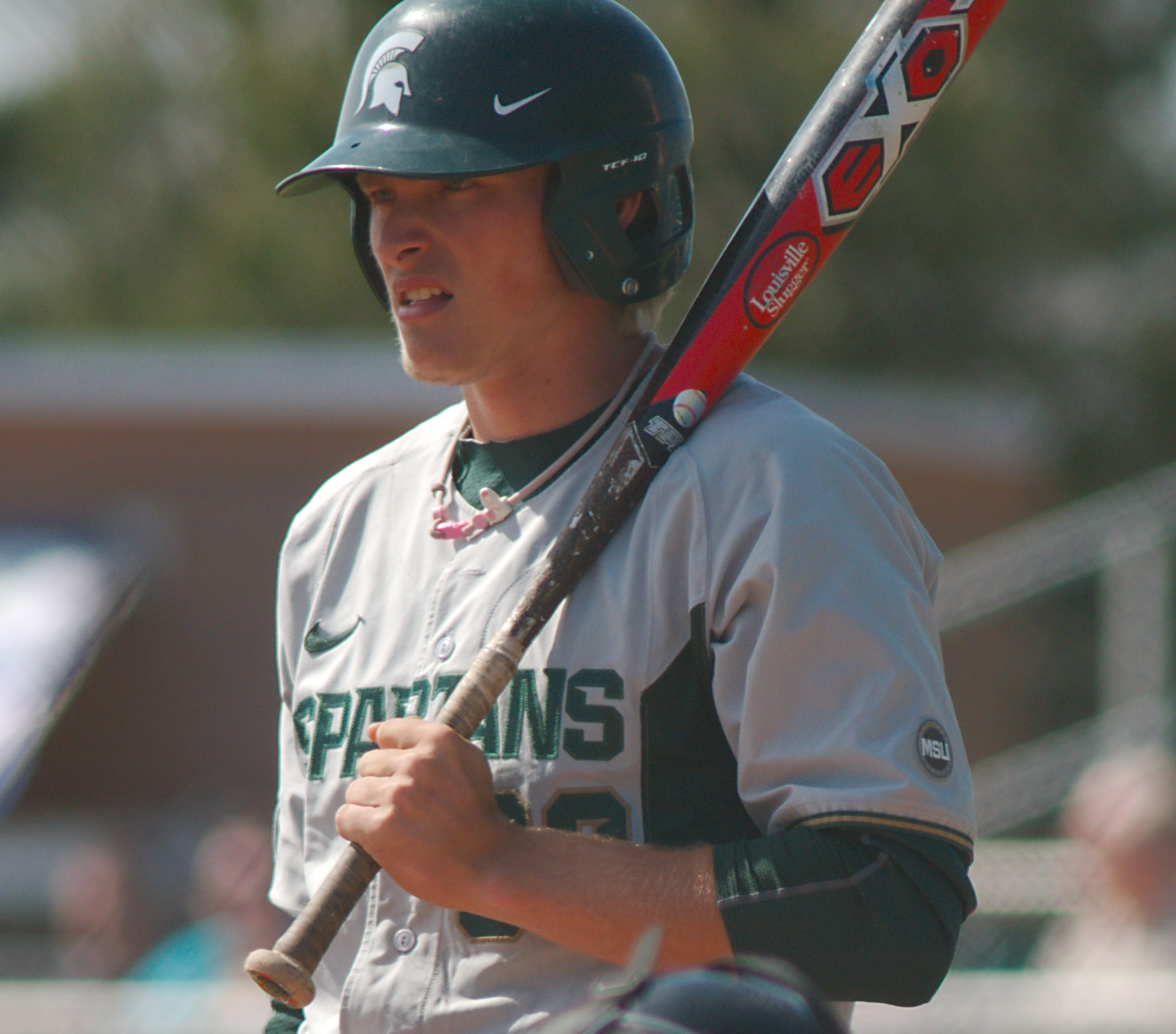
Cam Gibson with Michigan State in 2014

Gibson married JoAnn Sklarski on December 22, 1985, in a double ceremony where Tiger pitcher Dave Rozema married JoAnn's sister Sandy. They were married at Grosse Pointe Memorial Church in Grosse Pointe Farms, Michigan. The Gibsons reside in Grosse Pointe, Michigan, and have four children: Colleen, Cam, Kirk, and Kevin. Gibson's son Cam was drafted by the Detroit Tigers in the 5th round, 160th overall, in the 2015 Major League Baseball draft. His son Kevin is a defenseman for the Fort Wayne Komets in the ECHL.

Gibson set an aviation record in 1987. He flew a Cessna 206 to a height of 25,200 feet in Lakeland, Florida. The record was certified by the National Aeronautic Association.

He was nominated for induction into the College Football Hall of Fame multiple times before being elected in 2017.

Gibson is an avid deer hunter. He and former teammate David Wells, along with former MLB pitcher Jake Peavy, own a 1,300-acre hunting ranch near Millersburg, Michigan, which they named the "Buck Falls Ranch".

On April 28, 2015, it was announced that Gibson had been diagnosed with Parkinson's disease.

== See also ==
- 1984 Detroit Tigers season
- Detroit Tigers award winners and league leaders
- Los Angeles Dodgers award winners and league leaders
- Arizona Diamondbacks award winners and league leaders
- List of Major League Baseball career home run leaders
- List of Major League Baseball career stolen bases leaders

Sporting positions
Preceded by Bruce Fields	Detroit Tigers hitting coach 2005	Succeeded by Don Slaught
Preceded by Jay Bell	Arizona Diamondbacks bench coach 2007–2010	Succeeded by Bo Porter
