= 1988 Philadelphia Phillies season =

Major League Baseball season

1988 Philadelphia Phillies
- League: National League
- Division: East
- Ballpark: Veterans Stadium
- City: Philadelphia
- Owners: Bill Giles
- General managers: Woody Woodward, Lee Thomas
- Managers: Lee Elia
- Television: WTAF (Harry Kalas, Richie Ashburn, Andy Musser, Chris Wheeler); PRISM (Andy Musser, Chris Wheeler, Garry Maddox)
- Radio: WCAU (Harry Kalas, Richie Ashburn, Andy Musser, Chris Wheeler, Garry Maddox)

The 1988 Philadelphia Phillies season was the 106th season in the history of the franchise, and the 18th season for the Philadelphia Phillies at Veterans Stadium. The Phillies finished sixth in the National League East with a record of 65 wins and 96 losses.

== Offseason ==
- December 9, 1987: Glenn Wilson, Mike Jackson, and Dave Brundage (minors) were traded by the Phillies to the Seattle Mariners for Phil Bradley and Tim Fortugno.
- March 21, 1988: Rick Schu, Keith Hughes and Jeff Stone were traded by the Phillies to the Baltimore Orioles for Mike Young and a player to be named later. The Orioles completed the deal by sending Frank Bellino (minors) to the Phillies on June 14.

== Regular season ==
The Phillies were scheduled to play the Cubs in the first night game at Wrigley Field on August 8, 1988. The game began before an announced crowd of 39,008. The Cubs were leading 3 to 1 and coming to bat in the bottom of the fourth when the rain delay began. The umpires called the game after waiting two hours, ten minutes. The Cubs' first official night game came the following night against the Mets.

Montreal Expos pitcher Pascual Pérez threw a five-inning rain-shortened no-hitter against the Phillies on September 24, 1988. It was the first no-hitter in Veterans Stadium history. Perez allowed one walk, and another Phillies baserunner reached on an error. Umpire Harry Wendelstedt waved off the game after a 90-minute rain delay after the game was stopped by a steady rain with one out in the top of the sixth. However, due to a statistical rule change in 1991, no-hitters must last at least nine innings to count. As a result of the retroactive application of the new rule, this game and thirty-five others are no longer considered no-hitters.

=== Season standings ===
NL East
Team	W	L	Pct.	GB	Home	Road
New York Mets	100	60	.625	—	56‍–‍24	44‍–‍36
Pittsburgh Pirates	85	75	.531	15	43‍–‍38	42‍–‍37
Montreal Expos	81	81	.500	20	43‍–‍38	38‍–‍43
Chicago Cubs	77	85	.475	24	39‍–‍42	38‍–‍43
St. Louis Cardinals	76	86	.469	25	41‍–‍40	35‍–‍46
Philadelphia Phillies	65	96	.404	35½	38‍–‍42	27‍–‍54

=== Record vs. opponents ===
1988 National League record Sources:
Team	ATL	CHC	CIN	HOU	LAD	MON	NYM	PHI	PIT	SD	SF	STL
Atlanta	—	5–7	5–13	5–13	4–14	4–8	4–8	6–6	5–5	8–10	5–13	3–9
Chicago	7–5	—	6–6	7–5	4–8–1	9–9	9–9	8–10	7–11	8–4	5–7	7–11
Cincinnati	13–5	6–6	—	9–9	7–11	5–7	4–7	9–3	7–5	10–8	11–7	6–6
Houston	13–5	5–7	9–9	—	9–9	6–6	5–7	8–4	8–4	6–12	7–11	6–6
Los Angeles	14–4	8–4–1	11–7	9–9	—	8–4	1–10	11–1	6–6	7–11	12–6	7–5
Montreal	8–4	9–9	7–5	6–6	4–8	—	6–12	9–9–1	8–10	4–8	7–5	13–5
New York	8–4	9–9	7–4	7–5	10–1	12–6	—	10–8	12–6	7–5	4–8	14–4
Philadelphia	6-6	10–8	3–9	4–8	1–11	9–9–1	8–10	—	7–11	4–7	7–5	6–12
Pittsburgh	5–5	11–7	5–7	4–8	6–6	10–8	6–12	11–7	—	8–4	8–4	11–7
San Diego	10–8	4–8	8–10	12–6	11–7	8–4	5–7	7–4	4–8	—	8–10	6–6
San Francisco	13–5	7–5	7–11	11–7	6–12	5–7	8–4	5–7	4–8	10–8	—	7–5
St. Louis	9–3	11–7	6–6	6–6	5–7	5–13	4–14	12–6	7–11	6–6	5–7	—

=== Notable transactions ===
- April 1, 1988: Greg A. Harris was signed as a free agent by the Phillies.
- June 1, 1988: Tim Mauser was drafted by the Phillies in the 3rd round of the 1988 Major League Baseball draft.
- July 15, 1988: Luis Aguayo was traded by the Philadelphia Phillies to the New York Yankees for Amalio Carreno.

=== 1988 Game Log ===
Legend
	Phillies win
	Phillies loss
	Phillies tie
	Postponement
**Bold**	Phillies team member

1988 Game Log
Overall Record: 65–96–1
April (7–12–1)

#	Date	Opponent	Score	Win	Loss	Save	Attendance	Record
1	April 5	Pirates	3–5	Mike Dunne (1–0)	**Shane Rawley** (0–1)	Jeff Robinson (1)	46,394	0–1
2	April 6	Pirates	6–5 (14)	**Mike Maddux** (1–0)	Bob Kipper (0–1)	None	15,532	1–1
–	April 7	Pirates	Postponed (rain); Makeup: August 12 as a traditional double-header					
3	April 8	Mets	5–1	**Bruce Ruffin** (1–0)	Sid Fernandez (0–1)	None	21,921	2–1
4	April 9	Mets	9–3	**Don Carman** (1–0)	Rick Aguilera (0–1)	None	30,994	3–1
5	April 10	Mets	3–4	Dwight Gooden (2–0)	**Shane Rawley** (0–2)	Randy Myers (2)	51,781	3–2
6	April 11	@ Pirates	1–5	Doug Drabek (1–0)	**Kevin Gross** (0–1)	None	54,089	3–3
7	April 13	@ Pirates	0–7	Brian Fisher (2–0)	**Bruce Ruffin** (1–1)	None	9,825	3–4
8	April 14	@ Pirates	2–4	Bob Walk (1–1)	**Don Carman** (1–1)	Jeff Robinson (3)	6,222	3–5
9	April 15	@ Expos	4–6	Andy McGaffigan (1–0)	**Todd Frohwirth** (0–1)	Tim Burke (1)	11,292	3–6
10	April 16	@ Expos	1–2 (10)	Tim Burke (1–0)	**Kent Tekulve** (0–1)	None	13,664	3–7
11	April 17	@ Expos	2–5	Pascual Pérez (2–1)	**Bill Dawley** (0–1)	Andy McGaffigan (1)	16,597	3–8
12	April 18	@ Mets	10–7	**Bruce Ruffin** (2–1)	Rick Aguilera (0–2)	None	14,931	4–8
13	April 19	@ Mets	10–2	**Don Carman** (2–1)	Bob Ojeda (2–1)	None	24,555	5–8
14	April 20	@ Mets	2–6	Dwight Gooden (4–0)	**Shane Rawley** (0–3)	None	27,714	5–9
15	April 22	Expos	2–0	**Kevin Gross** (1–1)	Pascual Pérez (2–2)	None	22,113	6–9
16	April 23	Expos	3–3 (7)	None	None	None	23,394	6–9–1
17	April 24	Expos	1–3	Dennis Martínez (3–2)	**Don Carman** (2–2)	Tim Burke (3)	47,917	6–10–1
18	April 26	@ Astros	1–3	Mike Scott (4–0)	**Shane Rawley** (0–4)	Dave Smith (3)	13,152	6–11–1
19	April 27	@ Astros	2–3 (10)	Dave Smith (1–1)	**Kent Tekulve** (0–2)	None	14,462	6–12–1
–	April 29	Braves	Postponed (rain); Makeup: July 18 as a traditional double-header					
20	April 30	Braves	7–5	**Don Carman** (3–2)	Rick Mahler (0–3)	**Kent Tekulve** (1)	19,138	7–12–1

May (12–16)

#	Date	Opponent	Score	Win	Loss	Save	Attendance	Record
21	May 1	Braves	5–9	Tom Glavine (1–3)	**Shane Rawley** (0–5)	None	42,491	7–13–1
22	May 2	Astros	7–1	**Kevin Gross** (2–1)	Nolan Ryan (2–2)	None	18,931	8–13–1
23	May 3	Astros	0–4	Bob Knepper (3–0)	**Bruce Ruffin** (2–2)	None	16,443	8–14–1
24	May 4	@ Reds	1–3	Danny Jackson (4–1)	**David Palmer** (0–1)	None	14,302	8–15–1
25	May 5	@ Reds	4–10	José Rijo (4–1)	**Bill Dawley** (0–2)	None	18,017	8–16–1
26	May 6	@ Braves	7–3	**Shane Rawley** (1–5)	Tom Glavine (1–4)	None	8,377	9–16–1
27	May 7	@ Braves	5–6	Paul Assenmacher (1–2)	**Kent Tekulve** (0–3)	None	15,578	9–17–1
28	May 8	@ Braves	5–1	**Bruce Ruffin** (3–2)	Pete Smith (1–3)	None	11,232	10–17–1
29	May 9	Reds	0–2	Danny Jackson (4–1)	**David Palmer** (0–2)	None	19,303	10–18–1
30	May 10	Reds	1–10	Tom Browning (1–0)	**Don Carman** (3–3)	None	22,626	10–19–1
31	May 11	Reds	4–3 (11)	**Kent Tekulve** (1–3)	John Franco (0–3)	None	21,640	11–19–1
32	May 13	@ Dodgers	2–1	**Kevin Gross** (3–1)	Tim Leary (2–3)	**Kent Tekulve** (2)	38,015	12–19–1
33	May 14	@ Dodgers	2–3	Don Sutton (3–2)	**Bruce Ruffin** (3–3)	Jay Howell (3)	47,379	12–20–1
34	May 15	@ Dodgers	2–9	Tim Belcher (3–1)	**David Palmer** (0–3)	None	41,045	12–21–1
35	May 16	@ Giants	3–0	**Shane Rawley** (2–5)	Rick Reuschel (5–2)	None	6,278	13–21–1
36	May 17	@ Giants	8–1	**Kevin Gross** (4–1)	Kelly Downs (1–4)	None	9,948	14–21–1
37	May 18	@ Giants	1–5	Mike Krukow (3–2)	**Bruce Ruffin** (3–4)	Scott Garrelts (2)	12,940	14–22–1
38	May 20	@ Padres	3–4	Mark Davis (2–3)	**Kent Tekulve** (1–4)	None	10,208	14–23–1
39	May 21	@ Padres	4–3	**Shane Rawley** (3–5)	Mark Grant (0–4)	**Steve Bedrosian** (1)	15,572	15–23–1
40	May 22	@ Padres	2–9	Eric Show (3–4)	**Kevin Gross** (4–2)	None	40,012	15–24–1
41	May 24	Dodgers	1–2 (12)	Alejandro Peña (2–1)	**Greg A. Harris** (0–1)	Jesse Orosco (4)	17,759	15–25–1
42	May 25	Dodgers	0–4	Tim Leary (4–3)	**David Palmer** (0–4)	None	24,444	15–26–1
43	May 26	Dodgers	8–10	Jay Howell (2–0)	**Steve Bedrosian** (0–1)	None	19,361	15–27–1
44	May 27	Giants	5–2	**Kevin Gross** (5–2)	Kelly Downs (2–5)	**Steve Bedrosian** (2)	24,038	16–27–1
45	May 28	Giants	4–3 (10)	**Greg A. Harris** (1–1)	Randy Bockus (0–1)	None	25,784	17–27–1
46	May 29	Giants	4–2	**Bruce Ruffin** (4–4)	Mike Krukow (4–3)	**Steve Bedrosian** (3)	40,276	18–27–1
47	May 30	Padres	7–3	**Shane Rawley** (4–5)	Ed Whitson (3–5)	None	17,910	19–27–1
48	May 31	Padres	0–8	Andy Hawkins (5–4)	**David Palmer** (0–5)	None	16,733	19–28–1

June (15–13)

#	Date	Opponent	Score	Win	Loss	Save	Attendance	Record
49	June 1	Padres	9–7	**Kent Tekulve** (2–4)	Lance McCullers (0–4)	**Greg A. Harris** (1)	16,270	20–28–1
50	June 2	Cardinals	2–3 (14)	John Costello (1–0)	**Danny Clay** (0–1)	None	20,210	20–29–1
51	June 3	Cardinals	4–5 (10)	Todd Worrell (3–2)	**Greg A. Harris** (1–2)	None	26,836	20–30–1
52	June 4	Cardinals	1–8	Cris Carpenter (2–0)	**Shane Rawley** (4–6)	None	34,081	20–31–1
53	June 5	Cardinals	6–3	**David Palmer** (1–5)	Randy O'Neal (2–3)	**Steve Bedrosian** (4)	43,429	21–31–1
54	June 6	@ Expos	5–4	**Kevin Gross** (6–2)	Floyd Youmans (1–5)	**Steve Bedrosian** (5)	12,127	22–31–1
55	June 7	@ Expos	10–5	**Greg A. Harris** (2–2)	Neal Heaton (2–4)	**Kent Tekulve** (3)	11,556	23–31–1
56	June 8	@ Expos	4–5 (10)	Jeff Parrett (5–1)	**Steve Bedrosian** (0–2)	None	10,214	23–32–1
57	June 10	@ Pirates	12–10	**Greg A. Harris** (3–2)	Jeff Robinson (3–2)	**Steve Bedrosian** (6)	20,001	24–32–1
58	June 11	@ Pirates	2–8	Mike Dunne (4–4)	**David Palmer** (1–6)	None	19,926	24–33–1
59	June 12	@ Pirates	5–4	**Kevin Gross** (7–2)	Brian Fisher (4–4)	**Steve Bedrosian** (7)	36,134	25–33–1
60	June 13	Expos	5–2	**Shane Rawley** (5–6)	Neal Heaton (2–5)	None	20,544	26–33–1
61	June 14 (1)	Expos	0–9	Dennis Martínez (7–6)	**Bruce Ruffin** (4–5)	None	see 2nd game	26–34–1
62	June 14 (2)	Expos	4–2	**Don Carman** (4–3)	John Dopson (1–4)	**Steve Bedrosian** (8)	24,082	27–34–1
63	June 15	Expos	6–2	**David Palmer** (2–6)	Floyd Youmans (2–6)	**Steve Bedrosian** (9)	23,553	28–34–1
64	June 17	@ Mets	3–1	**Kevin Gross** (8–2)	Dwight Gooden (9–3)	**Steve Bedrosian** (10)	46,502	29–34–1
65	June 18	@ Mets	2–3 (14)	Terry Leach (2–1)	**Todd Frohwirth** (0–2)	None	49,307	29–35–1
66	June 19	@ Mets	0–6	David Cone (8–1)	**Don Carman** (4–4)	None	46,773	29–36–1
67	June 20	Cubs	2–7	Jamie Moyer (4–7)	**Bruce Ruffin** (4–6)	None	26,616	29–37–1
68	June 21	Cubs	6–1	**David Palmer** (3–6)	Jeff Pico (2–2)	None	25,478	30–37–1
69	June 22	Cubs	5–3	**Todd Frohwirth** (1–2)	Rick Sutcliffe (5–5)	**Steve Bedrosian** (11)	27,322	31–37–1
70	June 23	@ Cardinals	0–2	John Tudor (4–2)	**Shane Rawley** (5–7)	None	36,176	31–38–1
71	June 24	@ Cardinals	7–6	**Bruce Ruffin** (5–6)	Todd Worrell (3–3)	**Steve Bedrosian** (12)	41,332	32–38–1
72	June 25	@ Cardinals	1–4	José DeLeón (5–5)	**Kevin Gross** (8–3)	None	44,214	32–39–1
73	June 26	@ Cardinals	7–5 (10)	**Steve Bedrosian** (1–2)	Larry McWilliams (4–3)	**Bruce Ruffin** (1)	38,237	33–39–1
74	June 27	@ Cubs	1–2	Rick Sutcliffe (6–5)	**Shane Rawley** (5–8)	Al Nipper (1)	27,945	33–40–1
75	June 28	@ Cubs	4–6	Mike Capel (2–1)	**Steve Bedrosian** (1–3)	Les Lancaster (3)	32,271	33–41–1
76	June 29	@ Cubs	4–2	**Mike Maddux** (2–0)	Calvin Schiraldi (4–6)	**Steve Bedrosian** (13)	30,812	34–41–1

July (11–18)

#	Date	Opponent	Score	Win	Loss	Save	Attendance	Record
77	July 1	Reds	3–5	Tom Browning (7–3)	**Shane Rawley** (5–9)	John Franco (10)	56,502	34–42–1
78	July 2	Reds	5–3	**David Palmer** (4–6)	Jack Armstrong (0–3)	**Steve Bedrosian** (14)	25,122	35–42–1
79	July 3	Reds	2–3	Danny Jackson (9–4)	**Kevin Gross** (8–4)	None	41,899	35–43–1
80	July 4	@ Braves	0–7	Pete Smith (3–8)	**Don Carman** (4–5)	None	23,921	35–44–1
81	July 5	@ Braves	5–10	Jose Alvarez (3–2)	**Bruce Ruffin** (5–7)	None	5,471	35–45–1
82	July 6	@ Braves	2–3	Zane Smith (4–6)	**Shane Rawley** (5–10)	Bruce Sutter (12)	6,537	35–46–1
83	July 7	@ Reds	2–5	Danny Jackson (10–4)	**Kevin Gross** (8–5)	John Franco (12)	31,910	35–47–1
84	July 8	@ Reds	1–0	**Don Carman** (5–5)	José Rijo (9–4)	**Steve Bedrosian** (15)	30,811	36–47–1
85	July 9	@ Reds	3–6	Rob Dibble (1–0)	**Kent Tekulve** (2–5)	John Franco (13)	29,473	36–48–1
86	July 10	@ Reds	4–5	Jack Armstrong (1–3)	**Shane Rawley** (5–11)	John Franco (14)	29,142	36–49–1
–	July 12	**1988 Major League Baseball All-Star Game** at Riverfront Stadium in Cincinnati						
87	July 14	Astros	5–7	Juan Agosto (7–0)	**Kent Tekulve** (2–6)	Dave Smith (15)	24,302	36–50–1
88	July 15	Astros	2–5	Jim Deshaies (6–6)	**Kevin Gross** (8–6)	Danny Darwin (1)	26,545	36–51–1
89	July 16	Astros	10–6	**Bruce Ruffin** (6–7)	Danny Darwin (3–9)	None	32,871	37–51–1
90	July 17	Astros	10–4	**Kent Tekulve** (3–6)	Bob Knepper (9–3)	None	28,149	38–51–1
91	July 18 (1)	Braves	8–9 (11)	Charlie Puleo (2–3)	**Bruce Ruffin** (6–8)	None	see 2nd game	38–52–1
92	July 18 (2)	Braves	4–1	**David Palmer** (5–6)	Germán Jiménez (0–3)	**Steve Bedrosian** (16)	22,066	39–52–1
93	July 19	Braves	6–4	**Kevin Gross** (9–6)	Zane Smith (4–7)	**Steve Bedrosian** (17)	19,735	40–52–1
94	July 20	Braves	4–3	**Don Carman** (6–5)	Pete Smith (3–10)	**Steve Bedrosian** (18)	17,747	41–52–1
95	July 21	@ Astros	0–2	Nolan Ryan (7–7)	**Mike Maddux** (2–1)	None	29,654	41–53–1
96	July 22	@ Astros	3–5	Bob Knepper (10–3)	**David Palmer** (5–7)	Danny Darwin (3)	40,922	41–54–1
97	July 23	@ Astros	6–7	Dave Smith (4–5)	**Steve Bedrosian** (1–4)	None	32,931	41–55–1
98	July 24	@ Astros	6–4	**Kevin Gross** (10–6)	Mike Scott (9–3)	**Steve Bedrosian** (19)	25,811	42–55–1
99	July 25	Mets	3–2	**Don Carman** (7–5)	Ron Darling (10–7)	**Bruce Ruffin** (2)	42,701	43–55–1
100	July 26	Mets	5–7	Terry Leach (4–1)	**Greg A. Harris** (3–3)	Randy Myers (15)	34,192	43–56–1
101	July 27	Mets	2–10	Dwight Gooden (13–5)	**David Palmer** (5–8)	None	36,016	43–57–1
102	July 28	Cubs	0–7	Calvin Schiraldi (6–8)	**Shane Rawley** (5–12)	None	23,767	43–58–1
103	July 29	Cubs	3–8	Rick Sutcliffe (8–9)	**Kevin Gross** (10–7)	None	25,118	43–59–1
104	July 30	Cubs	3–2	**Don Carman** (8–5)	Al Nipper (1–4)	**Steve Bedrosian** (20)	24,625	44–59–1
105	July 31	Cubs	6–3	**Mike Maddux** (3–1)	Greg Maddux (15–5)	**Bruce Ruffin** (3)	35,066	45–59–1

August (9–19)

#	Date	Opponent	Score	Win	Loss	Save	Attendance	Record
106	August 2	@ Cardinals	2–0	**David Palmer** (6–8)	Joe Magrane (1–5)	None	27,744	46–59–1
107	August 3	@ Cardinals	2–4	Bob Forsch (5–3)	**Kevin Gross** (10–8)	Scott Terry (3)	23,277	46–60–1
108	August 4	@ Cardinals	2–9	José DeLeón (8–8)	**Shane Rawley** (5–13)	None	23,955	46–61–1
109	August 5	@ Cubs	9–3	**Don Carman** (9–5)	Greg Maddux (15–6)	None	28,801	47–61–1
110	August 6	@ Cubs	4–7	Al Nipper (2–4)	**Mike Maddux** (3–2)	Rich Gossage (11)	32,057	47–62–1
111	August 7	@ Cubs	7–4	**David Palmer** (7–8)	Jamie Moyer (5–11)	**Steve Bedrosian** (21)	31,350	48–62–1
–	August 8	@ Cubs	(Was to have been the 1st MLB night game at Wrigley Field) Postponed (rain); Makeup: September 5 as a traditional double-header					
112	August 9	Cardinals	3–7	Dan Quisenberry (2–1)	**Steve Bedrosian** (1–5)	None	25,533	48–63–1
113	August 10	Cardinals	0–1	John Tudor (6–5)	**Don Carman** (9–6)	Todd Worrell (22)	24,837	48–64–1
114	August 11	Cardinals	1–0	**Steve Bedrosian** (2–5)	John Costello (3–1)	None	25,607	49–64–1
115	August 12 (1)	Pirates	9–1	**Kevin Gross** (11–8)	Mike Dunne (6–9)	None	see 2nd game	50–64–1
116	August 12 (2)	Pirates	6–4	**Steve Bedrosian** (3–5)	Bob Kipper (2–4)	None	37,673	51–64–1
117	August 13	Pirates	4–10	Jeff Robinson (9–2)	**Greg A. Harris** (3–4)	None	35,432	51–65–1
118	August 14	Pirates	8–9	Jim Gott (6–4)	**Steve Bedrosian** (3–6)	None	36,468	51–66–1
119	August 16	@ Dodgers	5–7	Tim Leary (13–8)	**Don Carman** (9–7)	Jay Howell (15)	32,482	51–67–1
120	August 17	@ Dodgers	2–7	John Tudor (7–5)	**Mike Maddux** (3–3)	None	42,701	51–68–1
121	August 18	@ Dodgers	1–2	Jay Howell (3–3)	**Kevin Gross** (11–9)	Jesse Orosco (8)	34,467	51–69–1
122	August 19	@ Giants	2–6	Kelly Downs (13–9)	**Bruce Ruffin** (6–9)	Scott Garrelts (12)	14,721	51–70–1
123	August 20	@ Giants	3–4	Don Robinson (5–3)	**Marvin Freeman** (0–1)	Scott Garrelts (13)	26,818	51–71–1
124	August 21	@ Giants	3–6	Atlee Hammaker (7–5)	**Don Carman** (9–8)	Lary Sorensen (1)	31,820	51–72–1
125	August 22	@ Padres	6–5	**Greg A. Harris** (4–4)	Jimmy Jones (8–11)	**Steve Bedrosian** (22)	20,577	52–72–1
126	August 23	@ Padres	1–9	Ed Whitson (11–8)	**Kevin Gross** (11–10)	None	10,535	52–73–1
127	August 24	@ Padres	2–5	Eric Show (11–10)	**David Palmer** (7–9)	None	14,632	52–74–1
128	August 26	Dodgers	2–7	Tim Belcher (10–4)	**Marvin Freeman** (0–2)	None	27,533	52–75–1
129	August 27	Dodgers	2–4	Tim Leary (15–8)	**Don Carman** (9–9)	Jay Howell (16)	27,324	52–76–1
130	August 28	Dodgers	0–5	John Tudor (8–6)	**Kevin Gross** (11–11)	None	28,570	52–77–1
131	August 29	Giants	3–0	**Shane Rawley** (6–13)	Atlee Hammaker (7–6)	**Steve Bedrosian** (23)	16,854	53–77–1
132	August 30	Giants	7–5	**Steve Bedrosian** (4–6)	Craig Lefferts (2–8)	None	24,730	54–77–1
133	August 31	Giants	2–3 (11)	Scott Garrelts (5–7)	**Bruce Ruffin** (6–10)	None	23,233	54–78–1

September (10–17)

#	Date	Opponent	Score	Win	Loss	Save	Attendance	Record
134	September 2	Padres	4–7	Jimmy Jones (9–12)	**Don Carman** (9–10)	Mark Davis (25)	15,384	54–79–1
135	September 3	Padres	2–5	Ed Whitson (12–8)	**Kevin Gross** (11–12)	None	16,315	54–80–1
–	September 4	Padres	Cancelled (rain); Was not rescheduled					
136	September 5 (1)	@ Cubs	3–14	Rick Sutcliffe (12–11)	**Bob Sebra** (0–1)	None	see 2nd game	54–81–1
137	September 5 (2)	@ Cubs	4–3	**Shane Rawley** (7–13)	Scott Sanderson (1–1)	**Steve Bedrosian** (24)	27,084	55–81–1
138	September 6	@ Cubs	3–2	**Marvin Freeman** (1–2)	Jamie Moyer (7–14)	**Steve Bedrosian** (25)	23,189	56–81–1
139	September 7	@ Cardinals	0–5	Joe Magrane (4–8)	**Don Carman** (9–11)	None	23,535	56–82–1
140	September 8	@ Cardinals	0–1	Larry McWilliams (5–6)	**Kevin Gross** (11–13)	Todd Worrell (28)	19,211	56–83–1
141	September 9	@ Pirates	2–5	Mike Dunne (7–11)	**Bob Sebra** (0–2)	Jim Gott (28)	15,446	56–84–1
142	September 10	@ Pirates	1–5	Dave LaPoint (14–11)	**Shane Rawley** (7–14)	None	27,804	56–85–1
143	September 11	@ Pirates	7–4	**Marvin Freeman** (2–2)	John Smiley (11–10)	None	18,132	57–85–1
144	September 12	Cubs	5–1	**Don Carman** (10–11)	Jamie Moyer (7–15)	**Kent Tekulve** (4)	13,433	58–85–1
145	September 13	Cubs	2–9	Greg Maddux (17–7)	**Kevin Gross** (11–14)	None	13,301	58–86–1
146	September 14	Cardinals	9–2	**Bob Sebra** (1–2)	Greg Mathews (4–6)	None	13,829	59–86–1
147	September 15	Cardinals	1–3	Scott Terry (9–3)	**Shane Rawley** (7–15)	Todd Worrell (30)	10,434	59–87–1
148	September 16	Pirates	5–7	Jeff Robinson (10–5)	**Greg A. Harris** (4–5)	Jim Gott (30)	17,446	59–88–1
149	September 17	Pirates	2–7	Doug Drabek (15–6)	**Don Carman** (10–12)	Jeff Robinson (9)	14,528	59–89–1
150	September 18	Pirates	6–5 (10)	**Steve Bedrosian** (5–6)	Randy Kramer (0–1)	None	21,282	60–89–1
151	September 20	@ Mets	4–6	David Cone (18–3)	**Shane Rawley** (7–16)	None	30,337	60–90–1
152	September 21	@ Mets	3–4	Sid Fernandez (10–10)	**Marvin Freeman** (2–3)	Randy Myers (24)	35,450	60–91–1
153	September 22	@ Mets	1–3	Ron Darling (16–9)	**Don Carman** (10–13)	None	45,274	60–92–1
154	September 23	Expos	2–3	Jeff Parrett (12–3)	**Kent Tekulve** (3–7)	Tim Burke (16)	13,386	60–93–1
155	September 24	Expos	0–1 (6)	Pascual Pérez (12–7)	**Alex Madrid** (0–1)	None	14,088	60–94–1
156	September 25	Expos	8–5	**Shane Rawley** (8–16)	Dennis Martínez (15–13)	**Steve Bedrosian** (26)	20,188	61–94–1
157	September 26	Mets	4–10	Sid Fernandez (11–10)	**Greg A. Harris** (4–6)	None	20,694	61–95–1
158	September 27	Mets	5–4	**Steve Bedrosian** (6–6)	Roger McDowell (5–5)	None	19,259	62–95–1
159	September 28	Mets	9–3	**Kevin Gross** (12–14)	Dwight Gooden (18–9)	None	20,914	63–95–1
160	September 30	@ Expos	2–1	**Alex Madrid** (1–1)	Pascual Pérez (12–8)	**Steve Bedrosian** (27)	7,362	64–95–1

October (1–1)

#	Date	Opponent	Score	Win	Loss	Save	Attendance	Record
161	October 1	@ Expos	5–4	**Mike Maddux** (4–3)	Jeff Parrett (12–4)	**Steve Bedrosian** (28)	9,105	65–95–1
162	October 2	@ Expos	1–3	Brian Holman (4–8)	**Don Carman** (10–14)	Joe Hesketh (9)	13,498	65–96–1

=== Roster ===
1988 Philadelphia Phillies
**Roster**
**Pitchers**: 31 Salomé Barojas; 40 Steve Bedrosian; 31 Jeff Calhoun; 42 Don Carman; 35 Danny Clay; 43 Bill Dawley; 48 Marvin Freeman; 52 Todd Frohwirth; 46 Kevin Gross; 33 Greg A. Harris; 44 Mike Maddux; 34 Alex Madrid; 37 Brad Moore; 45 David Palmer; 28 Shane Rawley; 38 Wally Ritchie; 47 Bruce Ruffin; 34 Bill Scherrer; 37 Bob Sebra; 39 Scott Service; 27 Kent Tekulve	**Catchers**: 10 Darren Daulton; 35 Al Pardo; 13 Lance Parrish; 6 John Russell; **Infielders**: 16 Luis Aguayo; 15 Bill Almon; 14 Tom Barrett; 15 Jackie Gutiérrez; 9 Von Hayes; 30 Steve Jeltz; 17 Ricky Jordan; 8 Juan Samuel; 20 Mike Schmidt; 25 Shane Turner	**Outfielders**: 29 Phil Bradley; 22 Bob Dernier; 21 Greg Gross; 18 Chris James; 26 Ron Jones; 11 Keith Miller; 24 Milt Thompson; 19 Mike Young	**Manager**: 4 Lee Elia (4/5 - 9/22); 7 John Vukovich (9/23 - 10/2); **Coaches**: 16 Larry Bowa (Third Base, 8/16 - 10/2); 2 Dave Bristol (Third Base, 4/5 - 7/14); 3 Claude Osteen (Pitching); 5 Mike Ryan (Bullpen); 12 Tony Taylor (First Base & Hitting, 7/15 - 10/2); 25 Del Unser (Hitting, 4/5 - 7/14); 7 John Vukovich (Bench & Third Base, 7/15 - 8/15)

== Player stats ==
= Indicates team leader

=== Batting ===
==== Starters by position ====
Note: Pos = Position; G = Games played; AB = At bats; H = Hits; Avg. = Batting average; HR = Home runs; RBI = Runs batted in

Pos	Player	G	AB	H	Avg.	HR	RBI
C	Lance Parrish	123	424	91	.215	15	60
1B	Von Hayes	104	367	100	.272	6	45
2B	Juan Samuel	157	629	153	.243	12	67
SS	Steve Jeltz	148	379	71	.187	0	27
3B	Mike Schmidt	108	390	97	.249	12	62
LF	Phil Bradley	154	569	150	.264	11	56
CF	Milt Thompson	122	378	109	.288	2	33
RF	Chris James	150	566	137	.242	19	66

==== Other batters ====
Note: G = Games played; AB = At bats; H = Hits; Avg. = Batting average; HR = Home runs; RBI = Runs batted in

Player	G	AB	H	Avg.	HR	RBI
Ricky Jordan	69	273	84	.308	11	43
Bob Dernier	68	166	48	.289	1	10
Mike Young	75	146	33	.226	1	14
Darren Daulton	58	144	30	.208	1	12
Greg Gross	98	133	27	.203	0	5
Ron Jones	33	124	36	.290	8	26
Luis Aguayo	49	97	24	.247	3	5
Jackie Gutiérrez	33	77	19	.247	0	9
Tom Barrett	36	54	11	.204	0	3
John Russell	22	49	12	.245	2	4
Keith Miller	47	48	8	.167	0	6
Shane Turner	18	35	6	.171	0	1
Bill Almon	20	26	3	.115	0	1
Al Pardo	2	2	0	.000	0	0

=== Pitching ===
==== Starting pitchers ====
Note: G = Games pitched; IP = Innings pitched; W = Wins; L = Losses; ERA = Earned run average; SO = Strikeouts

Player	G	IP	W	L	ERA	SO
Kevin Gross	33	231.2	12	14	3.69	162
Don Carman	36	201.1	10	14	4.29	116
Shane Rawley	32	198.0	8	16	4.18	87
David Palmer	22	129.0	7	9	4.47	85
Marvin Freeman	11	51.2	2	3	6.10	37
Bob Sebra	3	11.1	1	2	7.94	7

==== Other pitchers ====
Note: G = Games pitched; IP = Innings pitched; W = Wins; L = Losses; ERA = Earned run average; SO = Strikeouts

Player	G	IP	W	L	ERA	SO
Bruce Ruffin	55	144.1	6	10	4.43	81
Mike Maddux	25	88.2	4	3	3.76	59
Alex Madrid	5	16.1	1	1	2.76	2

==== Relief pitchers ====
Note: G = Games pitched; W = Wins; L = Losses; SV = Saves; ERA = Earned run average; SO = Strikeouts

Player	G	W	L	SV	ERA	SO
Steve Bedrosian	57	6	6	28	3.75	61
Kent Tekulve	70	3	7	4	3.60	43
Greg Harris	66	4	6	1	2.36	71
Wally Ritchie	19	0	0	0	3.12	8
Danny Clay	17	0	1	0	6.00	12
Todd Frohwirth	12	1	2	0	8.25	11
Bill Dawley	8	0	2	0	13.50	3
Bill Scherrer	8	0	0	0	5.40	3
Salomé Barojas	6	0	0	0	8.31	1
Brad Moore	5	0	0	0	0.00	2
Scott Service	5	0	0	0	1.69	6
Jeff Calhoun	3	0	0	0	15.43	1

== Awards and honors ==
All-Star Game

- Kevin Gross, Pitcher, Reserve
- Lance Parrish, Catcher, Reserve

== Farm system ==
Level	Team	League	Manager
AAA	Maine Phillies	International League	George Culver
AA	Reading Phillies	Eastern League	Bill Dancy
A	Clearwater Phillies	Florida State League	Granny Hamner
A	Spartanburg Phillies	South Atlantic League	Mel Roberts
A-Short Season	Batavia Clippers	New York–Penn League	Don McCormack
Rookie	Martinsville Phillies	Appalachian League	Roly de Armas

LEAGUE CHAMPIONS: Spartanburg
