= 1988 San Francisco Giants season =

1988 San Francisco Giants
- League: National League
- Division: West
- Ballpark: Candlestick Park
- City: San Francisco, California
- Owners: Bob Lurie
- General managers: Al Rosen
- Managers: Roger Craig
- Television: KTVU (Duane Kuiper, Steve Physioc); GiantsVision (Joe Morgan, Duane Kuiper)
- Radio: KNBR (Ron Fairly, Wayne Hagin); KIQI (Tito Fuentes, Edgard Martinez)

The 1988 San Francisco Giants season was the Giants' 106th season in Major League Baseball, their 31st season in San Francisco since their move from New York following the 1957 season, and their 29th at Candlestick Park. The team finished in fourth place in the National League West with an 83–79 record, 11½ games behind the Los Angeles Dodgers.

== Offseason ==
- December 1, 1987: Brett Butler was signed as a free agent with the Giants.
- December 1, 1987: Joel Youngblood was signed as a free agent by the Giants.
- December 21, 1987: Phil Ouellette was released by the Giants.
- January 8, 1988: Atlee Hammaker was signed as a free agent by the Giants.

== Regular season ==
=== Opening Day starters ===
- Mike Aldrete
- Brett Butler
- Will Clark
- Dave Dravecky
- Candy Maldonado
- Francisco Meléndez
- Kevin Mitchell
- Robby Thompson
- José Uribe

=== Season standings ===
NL West
Team	W	L	Pct.	GB	Home	Road
Los Angeles Dodgers	94	67	.584	—	45‍–‍36	49‍–‍31
Cincinnati Reds	87	74	.540	7	45‍–‍35	42‍–‍39
San Diego Padres	83	78	.516	11	47‍–‍34	36‍–‍44
San Francisco Giants	83	79	.512	11½	45‍–‍36	38‍–‍43
Houston Astros	82	80	.506	12½	44‍–‍37	38‍–‍43
Atlanta Braves	54	106	.338	39½	28‍–‍51	26‍–‍55

=== Record vs. opponents ===
1988 National League record Sources:
Team	ATL	CHC	CIN	HOU	LAD	MON	NYM	PHI	PIT	SD	SF	STL
Atlanta	—	5–7	5–13	5–13	4–14	4–8	4–8	6–6	5–5	8–10	5–13	3–9
Chicago	7–5	—	6–6	7–5	4–8–1	9–9	9–9	8–10	7–11	8–4	5–7	7–11
Cincinnati	13–5	6–6	—	9–9	7–11	5–7	4–7	9–3	7–5	10–8	11–7	6–6
Houston	13–5	5–7	9–9	—	9–9	6–6	5–7	8–4	8–4	6–12	7–11	6–6
Los Angeles	14–4	8–4–1	11–7	9–9	—	8–4	1–10	11–1	6–6	7–11	12–6	7–5
Montreal	8–4	9–9	7–5	6–6	4–8	—	6–12	9–9–1	8–10	4–8	7–5	13–5
New York	8–4	9–9	7–4	7–5	10–1	12–6	—	10–8	12–6	7–5	4–8	14–4
Philadelphia	6-6	10–8	3–9	4–8	1–11	9–9–1	8–10	—	7–11	4–7	7–5	6–12
Pittsburgh	5–5	11–7	5–7	4–8	6–6	10–8	6–12	11–7	—	8–4	8–4	11–7
San Diego	10–8	4–8	8–10	12–6	11–7	8–4	5–7	7–4	4–8	—	8–10	6–6
San Francisco	13–5	7–5	7–11	11–7	6–12	5–7	8–4	5–7	4–8	10–8	—	7–5
St. Louis	9–3	11–7	6–6	6–6	5–7	5–13	4–14	12–6	7–11	6–6	5–7	—

=== Notable transactions ===
- June 1, 1988: Steve Decker was drafted by the Giants in the 21st round of the 1988 Major League Baseball draft. Player signed June 6, 1988.
- June 8, 1988: Jeffrey Leonard was traded by the Giants to the Milwaukee Brewers for Ernest Riles.
- July 15, 1988: Mark Wasinger was released by the Giants.

=== Roster ===
1988 San Francisco Giants
Roster
Pitchers: 31 Randy Bockus; 49 Jeff Brantley; 31 Dennis Cook; 33 Ron Davis; 37 Kelly Downs; 43 Dave Dravecky; 50 Scott Garrelts; 14 Atlee Hammaker; 39 Mike Krukow; 29 Mike LaCoss; 32 Craig Lefferts; 45 Terry Mulholland; 47 Joe Price; 48 Rick Reuschel; 40 Don Robinson; 58 Roger Samuels; 19 Lary Sorensen; 41 Trevor Wilson	Catchers: 15 Bob Brenly; 17 Kirt Manwaring; 7 Bob Melvin; Infielders: 22 Will Clark; 54 Ángel Escobar; 20 Phil Garner; 18 Francisco Meléndez; 7 Kevin Mitchell; 16 Tony Perezchica; 1 Ernest Riles; 35 Chris Speier; 16 Harry Spilman; 6 Robby Thompson; 23 José Uribe; 33 Mark Wasinger; 10 Matt Williams	Outfielders: 25 Mike Aldrete; 2 Brett Butler; 26 Charlie Hayes; 00 Jeffrey Leonard; 21 Candy Maldonado; 30 Donell Nixon; 30 Rusty Tillman; 8 Joel Youngblood; Other batters: 26 Jessie Reid	Manager: 38 Roger Craig; Coaches: 12 Dusty Baker (First Base); 42 Bill Fahey; 5 Bob Lillis; 28 José Morales (Hitting); 34 Norm Sherry

== Player stats ==
=== Batting ===
==== Starters by position ====
Note: Pos = Position; G = Games played; AB = At bats; H = Hits; Avg. = Batting average; HR = Home runs; RBI = Runs batted in

Pos	Player	G	AB	H	Avg.	HR	RBI
C	Bob Melvin	92	273	64	.234	8	27
1B	Will Clark	150	529	163	.308	35	91
2B	Robby Thompson	138	477	126	.264	7	48
SS	José Uribe	141	493	124	.252	3	35
3B	Kevin Mitchell	148	505	127	.251	19	80
LF	Mike Aldrete	139	389	104	.267	3	50
CF	Brett Butler	157	568	163	.287	6	43
RF	Candy Maldonado	142	499	127	.255	12	68

==== Other batters ====
Note: G = Games played; AB = At bats; H = Hits; Avg. = Batting average; HR = Home runs; RBI = Runs batted in

Player	G	AB	H	Avg.	HR	RBI
Bob Brenly	73	206	39	.189	5	22
Ernest Riles	79	187	55	.294	3	28
Chris Speier	82	171	37	.216	3	18
Jeffrey Leonard	44	160	41	.256	2	20
Matt Williams	52	156	32	.205	8	19
Joel Youngblood	83	123	31	.252	0	16
Kirt Manwaring	40	116	29	.250	1	15
Donell Nixon	59	78	27	.346	0	6
Harry Spilman	40	40	7	.175	1	3
Francisco Meléndez	23	26	5	.192	0	3
Phil Garner	15	13	2	.154	0	1
Charlie Hayes	7	11	1	.091	0	0
Tony Perezchica	7	8	1	.125	0	1
Rusty Tillman	4	4	1	.250	1	3
Ángel Escobar	3	3	1	.333	0	0
Jessie Reid	2	2	0	.000	0	0
Mark Wasinger	3	2	0	.000	0	0

=== Pitching ===
==== Starting pitchers ====
Note: G = Games pitched; IP = Innings pitched; W = Wins; L = Losses; ERA = Earned run average; SO = Strikeouts

Player	G	IP	W	L	ERA	SO
Rick Reuschel	36	245.0	19	11	3.12	92
Kelly Downs	27	168.0	13	9	3.32	118
Mike Krukow	20	124.2	7	4	3.54	75
Mike LaCoss	19	114.1	7	7	3.62	70
Dave Dravecky	7	37.0	2	2	3.16	19
Trevor Wilson	4	22.0	0	2	4.09	15
Dennis Cook	4	22.0	2	1	2.86	13

==== Other pitchers ====
Note: G = Games pitched; IP = Innings pitched; W = Wins; L = Losses; ERA = Earned run average; SO = Strikeouts

Player	G	IP	W	L	ERA	SO
Don Robinson	51	176.2	10	5	2.45	122
Atlee Hammaker	43	144.2	9	9	3.73	65
Terry Mulholland	9	46.0	2	1	3.72	18
Jeff Brantley	9	20.2	0	1	5.66	11

==== Relief pitchers ====
Note: G = Games pitched; W = Wins; L = Losses; SV = Saves; ERA = Earned run average; SO = Strikeouts

Player	G	W	L	SV	ERA	SO
Scott Garrelts	65	5	9	13	3.58	86
Craig Lefferts	64	3	8	11	2.92	58
Joe Price	38	1	6	4	3.94	49
Randy Bockus	20	1	1	0	4.78	18
Roger Samuels	15	1	2	0	3.47	22
Larry Sorenson	12	0	0	2	4.86	9
Ron Davis	9	1	1	0	4.67	15

== Award winners ==
- Will Clark, National League Leader, Runs Batted In (109)
- José Uribe SS, Willie Mac Award

All-Star Game

== Farm system ==
Level	Team	League	Manager
AAA	Phoenix Firebirds	Pacific Coast League	Wendell Kim
AA	Shreveport Captains	Texas League	Jack Mull
A	San Jose Giants	California League	Duane Espy
A	Clinton Giants	Midwest League	Bill Evers
A-Short Season	Everett Giants	Northwest League	Joe Strain
Rookie	Pocatello Giants	Pioneer League	Jack Hiatt
