= 1988 Pittsburgh Pirates season =

1988 Pittsburgh Pirates
- League: National League
- Division: East
- Ballpark: Three Rivers Stadium
- City: Pittsburgh, Pennsylvania
- Record: 85–75 (.531)
- Divisional place: 2nd
- Owners: Pittsburgh Associates
- General managers: Syd Thrift; Larry Doughty
- Managers: Jim Leyland
- Television: KDKA-TV (Steve Blass, Lanny Frattare, Jim Rooker, John Sanders); KBL (Steve Blass, Lanny Frattare, Jim Rooker, John Sanders)
- Radio: KDKA-AM (Steve Blass, Lanny Frattare, Jim Rooker, John Sanders)

The 1988 Pittsburgh Pirates season was the 107th season of the Pittsburgh Pirates franchise; the 102nd in the National League. This was their 19th season at Three Rivers Stadium. The Pirates finished second in the National League East with a record of 85–75.

== Offseason ==
- January 20, 1988: Dave Hostetler was signed as a free agent by the Pirates.
- March 26, 1988: Mackey Sasser and Tim Drummond were traded by the Pirates to the New York Mets for Randy Milligan and Scott Henion (minors).
- March 30, 1988: Hipólito Peña was traded by the Pirates to the New York Yankees for Orestes Destrade.
- March 31, 1988: Mike Bielecki was traded by the Pirates to the Chicago Cubs for Mike Curtis (minors).

== Regular season ==
=== Season standings ===
NL East
Team	W	L	Pct.	GB	Home	Road
New York Mets	100	60	.625	—	56‍–‍24	44‍–‍36
Pittsburgh Pirates	85	75	.531	15	43‍–‍38	42‍–‍37
Montreal Expos	81	81	.500	20	43‍–‍38	38‍–‍43
Chicago Cubs	77	85	.475	24	39‍–‍42	38‍–‍43
St. Louis Cardinals	76	86	.469	25	41‍–‍40	35‍–‍46
Philadelphia Phillies	65	96	.404	35½	38‍–‍42	27‍–‍54

=== Game log ===
1988 Game Log: 85–75 (Home: 43–38; Away: 42–37)
April: 16–6 (Home: 8–1; Away: 8–5)

#	Date	Opponent	Score	Win	Loss	Save	Attendance	Record
1	April 5	@ Phillies	5–3	**Dunne**	Rawley	**Robinson**	46,394	1–0
2	April 6	@ Phillies	5–6 (14)	Maddux	**Kipper**	—	15,532	1–1
3	April 8	@ Cardinals	4–3	**Fisher**	Cox	**Robinson**	51,647	2–1
4	April 9	@ Cardinals	0–3	Mathews	**Walk**	Worrell	36,542	2–2
5	April 10	@ Cardinals	5–3 (11)	**Kipper**	Worrell	**Gott**	31,968	3–2
6	April 11	Phillies	5–1	**Drabek**	Gross	—	54,089	4–2
7	April 13	Phillies	7–0	**Fisher**	Ruffin	—	9,825	5–2
8	April 14	Phillies	4–2	**Walk**	Carman	**Robinson**	6,222	6–2
9	April 15	@ Cubs	0–6	Sutcliffe	**Smiley**	—	35,084	6–3
10	April 16	@ Cubs	4–0	**Drabek**	Maddux	—	30,564	7–3
11	April 17	@ Cubs	12–7	**Robinson**	Schiraldi	—	29,562	8–3
12	April 19	Cardinals	3–0	**Fisher**	Cox	—	5,048	9–3
13	April 20	Cardinals	8–1	**Walk**	Mathews	—	15,522	10–3
14	April 21	Cardinals	3–9	O'Neal	**Smiley**	—	6,833	10–4
15	April 22	Cubs	8–4	**Drabek**	Lancaster	—	16,250	11–4
16	April 23	Cubs	5–4	**Gott**	Gossage	—	20,214	12–4
17	April 24	Cubs	4–2	**Walk**	Sutcliffe	**Robinson**	19,934	13–4
18	April 26	@ Giants	2–0	**Smiley**	Reuschel	**Gott**	11,738	14–4
19	April 27	@ Giants	4–6	Dravecky	**Drabek**	Price	10,137	14–5
20	April 28	@ Giants	2–1 (10)	**Robinson**	Lefferts	**Gott**	10,520	15–5
21	April 29	@ Padres	3–6	Hawkins	**Palacios**	Davis	16,185	15–6
22	April 30	@ Padres	5–1	**Walk**	Grant	—	24,357	16–6

May: 14–14 (Home: 10–6; Away: 4–8)

#	Date	Opponent	Score	Win	Loss	Save	Attendance	Record
23	May 1	@ Padres	4–2	**Smiley**	Show	**Gott**	21,694	17–6
24	May 2	@ Dodgers	3–6	Orosco	**Drabek**	—	26,821	17–7
25	May 3	@ Dodgers	6–14	Belcher	**Dunne**	—	26,943	17–8
26	May 4	@ Dodgers	5–8	Hershiser	**Palacios**	—	30,423	17–9
27	May 6	Padres	4–1 (12)	**Jones**	Davis	—	25,045	18–9
28	May 7	Padres	2–3	Show	**Gott**	—	24,555	18–10
29	May 8	Padres	6–2	**Drabek**	Jones	—	20,756	19–10
30	May 9	Giants	6–8	Robinson	**Robinson**	Lefferts	6,388	19–11
31	May 10	Giants	6–2	**Palacios**	Downs	**Gott**	9,275	20–11
32	May 11	Dodgers	2–1 (11)	**Medvin**	Pena	—	26,367	21–11
33	May 12	Dodgers	7–4	**Smiley**	Hershiser	—	11,072	22–11
34	May 13	Reds	6–5	**Robinson**	Murphy	—	31,705	23–11
35	May 14	Reds	3–5	Soto	**Dunne**	Franco	28,059	23–12
36	May 15	Reds	6–7 (12)	Franco	**Jones**	—	33,789	23–13
37	May 16	@ Astros	2–9	Deshaies	**Walk**	—	13,570	23–14
38	May 17	@ Astros	2–3	Scott	**Smiley**	Smith	15,000	23–15
39	May 18	@ Astros	2–4	Ryan	**Drabek**	Smith	19,259	23–16
40	May 20	Braves	10–3	**Dunne**	Glavine	—	18,880	24–16
41	May 21	Braves	7–3	**Fisher**	Coffman	—	21,211	25–16
42	May 22	Braves	4–6	Mahler	**Walk**	Sutter	32,683	25–17
43	May 23	Astros	0–3	Scott	**Smiley**	—	7,480	25–18
44	May 24	Astros	5–4	**Gott**	Andersen	—	8,200	26–18
45	May 25	Astros	4–3	**Dunne**	Andujar	**Robinson**	8,108	27–18
46	May 27	@ Reds	3–5	Pacillo	**Fisher**	Franco	29,445	27–19
47	May 28	@ Reds	5–2	**Walk**	Browning	**Robinson**	42,232	28–19
48	May 29	@ Reds	4–2	**Smiley**	Rasmussen	**Gott**	30,660	29–19
49	May 30	@ Braves	14–2	**Drabek**	Smith	—	6,893	30–19
50	May 31	@ Braves	1–11	Glavine	**Dunne**	—	4,483	30–20

June: 13–14 (Home: 6–10; Away: 7–4)

#	Date	Opponent	Score	Win	Loss	Save	Attendance	Record
51	June 1	@ Braves	2–14	Mahler	**Fisher**	—	6,059	30–21
52	June 2	Expos	3–7	Heaton	**Walk**	Hesketh	11,070	30–22
53	June 3	Expos	2–1	**Smiley**	Dopson	—	19,162	31–22
54	June 4	Expos	3–7	Martinez	**Drabek**	McClure	30,669	31–23
55	June 5	Expos	2–3	Smith	**Dunne**	Parrett	36,305	31–24
56	June 7	Cubs	5–8	Maddux	**Fisher**	Gossage	9,287	31–25
57	June 8	Cubs	5–1	**Walk**	Schiraldi	—	22,220	32–25
58	June 9	Cubs	4–3	**Gott**	DiPino	—	8,200	33–25
59	June 10	Phillies	10–12	Harris	**Robinson**	Bedrosian	20,001	33–26
60	June 11	Phillies	8–2	**Dunne**	Palmer	—	19,926	34–26
61	June 12	Phillies	4–5	Gross	**Fisher**	Bedrosian	36,134	34–27
62	June 13	@ Cubs	8–0	**Walk**	Schiraldi	—	27,142	35–27
63	June 14	@ Cubs	6–3	**Smiley**	Moyer	**Robinson**	28,077	36–27
64	June 15	@ Cubs	4–7	Perry	**Gott**	Gossage	26,126	36–28
65	June 17	Cardinals	3–7	Magrane	**Dunne**	—	30,267	36–29
66	June 18	Cardinals	3–6	Tudor	**Fisher**	Terry	36,682	36–30
67	June 19	Cardinals	3–2	**Walk**	McWilliams	**Gott**	27,656	37–30
68	June 20	@ Mets	8–5	**Smiley**	Ojeda	**Robinson**	42,413	38–30
69	June 21	@ Mets	0–9	Darling	**Drabek**	—	45,225	38–31
70	June 22	@ Mets	0–3	Gooden	**Dunne**	Myers	41,816	38–32
71	June 23	@ Expos	6–4	**Robinson**	Parrett	**Gott**	14,839	39–32
72	June 24	@ Expos	5–3 (10)	**Gott**	McClure	**Jones**	15,781	40–32
73	June 25	@ Expos	5–1	**Smiley**	Holman	—	17,777	41–32
74	June 26	@ Expos	3–0 (10)	**Robinson**	Burke	—	26,593	42–32
75	June 27	Mets	2–1	**Dunne**	Gooden	**Gott**	41,489	43–32
76	June 28	Mets	2–5	Fernandez	**Fisher**	McDowell	45,011	43–33
77	June 29	Mets	7–8 (11)	McDowell	**Kipper**	—	41,217	43–34

July: 15–11 (Home: 7–4; Away: 8–7)

#	Date	Opponent	Score	Win	Loss	Save	Attendance	Record
78	July 1	@ Giants	5–2 (10)	**Robinson**	Hammaker	—	39,484	44–34
79	July 2	@ Giants	1–2	LaCoss	**Rucker**	Garrelts	22,355	44–35
80	July 3	@ Giants	0–4	Downs	**Dunne**	—	25,463	44–36
81	July 4	@ Padres	3–4 (10)	Davis	**Gott**	—	35,406	44–37
82	July 5	@ Padres	3–2	**Walk**	Jones	**Jones**	10,415	45–37
83	July 7	@ Padres	2–0	**Smiley**	Hawkins	**Gott**	16,076	46–37
84	July 8	@ Dodgers	4–3	**Drabek**	Leary	**Gott**	40,690	47–37
85	July 9	@ Dodgers	8–2	**Dunne**	Hillegas	—	46,662	48–37
86	July 10	@ Dodgers	7–2	**Walk**	Hershiser	—	43,014	49–37
87	July 14	Giants	9–2	**Fisher**	Reuschel	—	28,325	50–37
88	July 15	Giants	8–5	**Kipper**	Downs	**Gott**	28,315	51–37
89	July 16	Giants	10–1	**Drabek**	LaCoss	—	28,997	52–37
90	July 17	Giants	5–4	**Robinson**	Price	**Gott**	25,512	53–37
91	July 19	Padres	2–6	Jones	**Smiley**	—		53–38
92	July 19	Padres	9–5	**Fisher**	Hawkins	—	15,847	54–38
93	July 20	Padres	3–2	**Walk**	Rasmussen	**Gott**	24,575	55–38
94	July 21	Dodgers	3–2	**Drabek**	Hershiser	**Gott**	27,510	56–38
95	July 22	Dodgers	2–4	Belcher	**Dunne**	Howell	44,888	56–39
96	July 23	Dodgers	2–6	Leary	**Smiley**	—	35,817	56–40
97	July 24	Dodgers	1–2	Hillegas	**Fisher**	Howell	35,677	56–41
98	July 25	@ Cardinals	1–5	Tudor	**Walk**	—	30,763	56–42
99	July 26	@ Cardinals	2–1	**Drabek**	Cox	**Gott**	32,735	57–42
100	July 27	@ Cardinals	3–2 (10)	**Robinson**	Dayley	**Gott**	31,618	58–42
101	July 29	@ Mets	0–1	Ojeda	**Smiley**	—	49,584	58–43
102	July 30	@ Mets	0–3	Fernandez	**Fisher**	Myers	50,815	58–44
103	July 31	@ Mets	1–2	Darling	**Walk**	—	46,917	58–45

August: 13–17 (Home: 6–10; Away: 7–7)

#	Date	Opponent	Score	Win	Loss	Save	Attendance	Record
104	August 1	@ Mets	7–2	**Drabek**	Gooden	—	52,231	59–45
105	August 2	Expos	3–2 (10)	**Gott**	Heaton	—	12,296	60–45
106	August 3	Expos	4–6	Perez	**Smiley**	Burke	16,099	60–46
107	August 4	Expos	2–3	Dopson	**Fisher**	Burke	17,726	60–47
108	August 5	Mets	2–3	Darling	**Walk**	Myers	39,925	60–48
109	August 6	Mets	3–5	McClure	**Gott**	McDowell	48,272	60–49
110	August 7	Mets	2–6	Cone	**Kipper**	—	44,931	60–50
111	August 8	Mets	1–0	**Reed**	Ojeda	**Gott**	38,307	61–50
112	August 9	@ Expos	10–8	**Fisher**	Dopson	**Gott**	37,681	62–50
113	August 10	@ Expos	4–5	Martinez	**Walk**	Burke	29,196	62–51
114	August 11	@ Expos	6–1	**Drabek**	Holman	**Gott**	33,599	63–51
115	August 12	@ Phillies	1–9	Gross	**Dunne**	—		63–52
116	August 12	@ Phillies	4–6	Bedrosian	**Kipper**	—	37,673	63–53
117	August 13	@ Phillies	10–4	**Robinson**	Harris	—	35,432	64–53
118	August 14	@ Phillies	9–8	**Gott**	Bedrosian	—	36,468	65–53
119	August 15	Braves	3–4	Puleo	**Walk**	Olwine	12,112	65–54
120	August 16	Braves	4–2	**Drabek**	Smith	**Gott**	13,994	66–54
121	August 17	Braves	2–1	**LaPoint**	Glavine	**Gott**	33,164	67–54
122	August 19	Astros	1–5	Darwin	**Dunne**	—	26,352	67–55
123	August 20	Astros	2–1	**Smiley**	Ryan	**Gott**	23,183	68–55
124	August 21	Astros	1–2 (14)	Agosto	**Kipper**	—	38,290	68–56
125	August 22	Reds	0–2	Jackson	**Drabek**	—	17,540	68–57
126	August 23	Reds	2–0	**LaPoint**	Charlton	**Gott**	13,406	69–57
127	August 24	Reds	2–6	Browning	**Dunne**	—	24,660	69–58
128	August 26	@ Astros	0–2	Deshaies	**Smiley**	—	27,650	69–59
129	August 27	@ Astros	1–3	Meads	**Walk**	Agosto	25,993	69–60
130	August 28	@ Astros	4–3	**Drabek**	Darwin	**Gott**	20,368	70–60
131	August 29	@ Reds	8–1	**LaPoint**	Brown	—	19,519	71–60
132	August 30	@ Reds	4–6	Jackson	**Fisher**	Franco	17,429	71–61
133	August 31	@ Reds	1–4	Charlton	**Gott**	Franco	18,586	71–62

September: 14–11 (Home: 6–7; Away: 8–4)

#	Date	Opponent	Score	Win	Loss	Save	Attendance	Record
134	September 2	@ Braves	1–2	Assenmacher	**Gott**	—	7,938	71–63
135	September 5	Mets	5–7	Cone	**Robinson**	Myers	38,876	71–64
136	September 6	Mets	3–2	**Smiley**	Ojeda	**Gott**	21,296	72–64
137	September 7	Expos	5–4	**Drabek**	Smith	**Gott**	16,494	73–64
138	September 8	Expos	4–5	Perez	**Robinson**	Hesketh	11,289	73–65
139	September 9	Phillies	5–2	**Dunne**	Sebra	**Gott**	15,446	74–65
140	September 10	Phillies	5–1	**LaPoint**	Rawley	—	27,804	75–65
141	September 11	Phillies	4–7	Freeman	**Smiley**	—	18,132	75–66
142	September 12	@ Mets	2–3	Myers	**Robinson**	—	39,576	75–67
143	September 13	@ Mets	1–0	**Walk**	Gooden	**Gott**	36,633	76–67
144	September 14	@ Expos	4–1 (12)	**Fisher**	Burke	—	10,886	77–67
145	September 15	@ Expos	4–9	Johnson	**LaPoint**	McGaffigan	9,494	77–68
146	September 16	@ Phillies	7–5	**Robinson**	Harris	**Gott**	17,446	78–68
147	September 17	@ Phillies	7–2	**Drabek**	Carman	**Robinson**	14,528	79–68
148	September 18	@ Phillies	5–6 (10)	Bedrosian	**Kramer**	—	21,282	79–69
149	September 19	@ Cardinals	5–4	**Robinson**	Dayley	**Gott**	19,683	80–69
150	September 20	@ Cardinals	5–1	**Medvin**	Terry	**Gott**	27,441	81–69
151	September 21	@ Cardinals	5–0	**Smiley**	DeLeon	—	28,350	82–69
152	September 23	Cubs	3–5 (10)	Moyer	**Kipper**	—	19,552	82–70
153	September 24	Cubs	1–2	Gossage	**Rucker**	DiPino	16,161	82–71
154	September 25	Cubs	7–4	**Kramer**	Sutcliffe	**Gott**	23,095	83–71
155	September 26	Cardinals	1–7	DeLeon	**LaPoint**	—	9,044	83–72
156	September 27	Cardinals	3–2	**Smiley**	Hill	**Gott**	8,994	84–72
157	September 28	Cardinals	1–2	Magrane	**Drabek**	—	21,004	84–73
158	September 30	@ Cubs	10–9 (10)	**Medvin**	Gossage	**Fisher**	9,805	85–73

October: 0–2 (Home: 0–0; Away: 0–2)

#	Date	Opponent	Score	Win	Loss	Save	Attendance	Record
159	October 1	@ Cubs	7–9	Blankenship	**Kramer**	Schiraldi	21,433	85–74
160	October 2	@ Cubs	4–8	Moyer	**Smiley**	—	22,909	85–75

Legend: = Win = Loss
Bold = Pirates team member

=== Record vs. opponents ===
1988 National League record Sources:
Team	ATL	CHC	CIN	HOU	LAD	MON	NYM	PHI	PIT	SD	SF	STL
Atlanta	—	5–7	5–13	5–13	4–14	4–8	4–8	6–6	5–5	8–10	5–13	3–9
Chicago	7–5	—	6–6	7–5	4–8–1	9–9	9–9	8–10	7–11	8–4	5–7	7–11
Cincinnati	13–5	6–6	—	9–9	7–11	5–7	4–7	9–3	7–5	10–8	11–7	6–6
Houston	13–5	5–7	9–9	—	9–9	6–6	5–7	8–4	8–4	6–12	7–11	6–6
Los Angeles	14–4	8–4–1	11–7	9–9	—	8–4	1–10	11–1	6–6	7–11	12–6	7–5
Montreal	8–4	9–9	7–5	6–6	4–8	—	6–12	9–9–1	8–10	4–8	7–5	13–5
New York	8–4	9–9	7–4	7–5	10–1	12–6	—	10–8	12–6	7–5	4–8	14–4
Philadelphia	6-6	10–8	3–9	4–8	1–11	9–9–1	8–10	—	7–11	4–7	7–5	6–12
Pittsburgh	5–5	11–7	5–7	4–8	6–6	10–8	6–12	11–7	—	8–4	8–4	11–7
San Diego	10–8	4–8	8–10	12–6	11–7	8–4	5–7	7–4	4–8	—	8–10	6–6
San Francisco	13–5	7–5	7–11	11–7	6–12	5–7	8–4	5–7	4–8	10–8	—	7–5
St. Louis	9–3	11–7	6–6	6–6	5–7	5–13	4–14	12–6	7–11	6–6	5–7	—

=== Detailed records ===
**National League**
Opponent	W	L	WP	RS	RA
**NL East**
Chicago Cubs	11	7	0.611	97	82
Montreal Expos	10	8	0.556	75	70
New York Mets	6	12	0.333	46	65
Philadelphia Phillies	11	7	0.611	105	81
St. Louis Cardinals	11	7	0.611	58	58
Total	49	41	0.544	381	356
**NL West**
Atlanta Braves	5	5	0.500	48	48
Cincinnati Reds	5	7	0.417	44	45
Houston Astros	4	8	0.333	24	42
Los Angeles Dodgers	6	6	0.500	50	54
San Diego Padres	8	4	0.667	46	34
San Francisco Giants	8	4	0.667	58	37
Total	36	34	0.514	270	260
Season Total	85	75	0.531	651	616

Month	Games	Won	Lost	Win %	RS	RA
April	22	16	6	0.727	98	68
May	28	14	14	0.500	129	128
June	27	13	14	0.481	113	127
July	26	15	11	0.577	94	74
August	30	13	17	0.433	103	110
September	25	14	11	0.560	103	92
October	2	0	2	0.000	11	17
Total	160	85	75	0.531	651	616

	Games	Won	Lost	Win %	RS	RA
Home	81	43	38	0.531	326	298
Away	79	42	37	0.532	325	318
Total	160	85	75	0.531	651	616

== Roster ==
1988 Pittsburgh Pirates
Roster
Pitchers: 15 Doug Drabek; 41 Mike Dunne; 54 Brian Fisher; 27 Miguel García; 35 Jim Gott; 50 Barry Jones; 16 Bob Kipper; 60 Randy Kramer; 50 Dave LaPoint; 59 Morris Madden; 58 Vicente Palacios; 34 Rick Reed; 49 Jeff Robinson; 36,51 Dave Rucker; 57 John Smiley; 17 Bob Walk	Catchers: 12 Mike LaValliere; 26 Junior Ortiz; 46 Tom Prince; 3 Rubén Rodríguez; Infielders: 6 Rafael Belliard; 25 Bobby Bonilla; 5 Sid Bream; 2 Orestes Destrade; 30 Benny Distefano; 29 Félix Fermín; 28 Denny González; 55 Dave Hostetler; 13 José Lind; 47 Randy Milligan; 14 Ken Oberkfell; 22 Al Pedrique	Outfielders: 24 Barry Bonds; 44 John Cangelosi; 7 Darnell Coles; 14 Mike Diaz; 47 Tommy Gregg; 19 Gary Redus; 23 R. J. Reynolds; 18 Andy Van Slyke; 11 Glenn Wilson	Manager: 10 Jim Leyland; Coaches: 45 Rich Donnelly (bullpen); 32 Gene Lamont (third base); 39 Milt May (hitting); 31 Ray Miller (pitching); 37 Tommy Sandt (first base)

=== Opening Day lineup ===
Opening Day Starters
#	Name	Position
24	Barry Bonds	LF
13	José Lind	2B
18	Andy Van Slyke	CF
25	Bobby Bonilla	3B
7	Darnell Coles	RF
47	Randy Milligan	1B
12	Mike LaValliere	C
22	Al Pedrique	SS
41	Mike Dunne	SP

== Player stats ==
Batting

Note: G = Games played; AB = At bats; H = Hits; Avg. = Batting average; HR = Home runs; RBI = Runs batted in

Regular season
Player	G	AB	H	Avg.	HR	RBI
Benny Distefano	16	29	10	0.345	1	6
Andy Van Slyke	154	587	169	0.288	25	100
Barry Bonds	144	538	152	0.283	24	58
Junior Ortiz	49	118	33	0.280	2	18
Felix Fermin	43	87	24	0.276	0	2
Bobby Bonilla	159	584	160	0.274	24	100
Glenn Wilson	37	126	34	0.270	2	15
Sid Bream	148	462	122	0.264	10	65
Jose Lind	154	611	160	0.262	2	49
Michael LaValliere	120	352	92	0.261	2	47
John Cangelosi	75	118	30	0.254	0	8
Dave Hostetler	6	8	2	0.250	0	0
R. J. Reynolds	130	323	80	0.248	6	51
Darnell Coles	68	211	49	0.232	5	36
Mike Diaz	47	74	17	0.230	0	5
Ken Oberkfell	20	54	12	0.222	0	2
Randy Milligan	40	82	18	0.220	3	8
Rafael Belliard	122	286	61	0.213	0	11
Tommy Gregg	14	15	3	0.200	1	3
Ruben Rodriguez	2	5	1	0.200	0	1
Gary Redus	30	71	14	0.197	2	4
Denny Gonzalez	24	32	6	0.188	0	1
Jeff Robinson	75	16	3	0.188	0	1
Al Pedrique	50	128	23	0.180	0	4
Tom Prince	29	74	13	0.176	0	6
Doug Drabek	33	76	13	0.171	0	5
Orestes Destrade	36	47	7	0.149	1	3
Mike Dunne	34	46	5	0.109	0	3
Bob Walk	34	69	6	0.087	0	5
John Smiley	34	63	5	0.079	0	1
Dave LaPoint	8	16	1	0.063	0	0
Brian Fisher	33	42	2	0.048	0	1
Jim Gott	67	1	0	0.000	0	0
Barry Jones	42	5	0	0.000	0	0
Bob Kipper	50	4	0	0.000	0	0
Randy Kramer	5	2	0	0.000	0	0
Scott Medvin	17	3	0	0.000	0	0
Vicente Palacios	7	8	0	0.000	0	0
Rick Reed	2	4	0	0.000	0	0
Dave Rucker	31	2	0	0.000	0	0
Miguel Garcia	1	0	0	—	0	0
Morris Madden	6	0	0	—	0	0
Team totals	160	5,379	1,327	0.247	110	619

Pitching

Note: G = Games pitched; IP = Innings pitched; W = Wins; L = Losses; ERA = Earned run average; SO = Strikeouts

Regular season
Player	G	IP	W	L	ERA	SO
John Cangelosi	1	2	0	0	0.00	0
Morris Madden	5	5 2/3	0	0	0.00	3
Bob Walk	32	212 2/3	12	10	2.71	81
Dave LaPoint	8	52	4	2	2.77	19
Rick Reed	2	12	1	0	3.00	6
Jeff Robinson	75	124 2/3	11	5	3.03	87
Barry Jones	42	56 1/3	1	1	3.04	31
Doug Drabek	33	219 1/3	15	7	3.08	127
John Smiley	34	205	13	11	3.25	129
Jim Gott	67	77 1/3	6	6	3.49	76
Bob Kipper	50	65	2	6	3.74	39
Mike Dunne	30	170	7	11	3.92	70
Miguel Garcia	1	2	0	0	4.50	2
Brian Fisher	33	146 1/3	8	10	4.61	66
Dave Rucker	31	28 1/3	0	2	4.76	16
Scott Medvin	17	27 2/3	3	0	4.88	16
Randy Kramer	5	10	1	2	5.40	7
Vicente Palacios	7	24 1/3	1	2	6.66	15
Team totals	160	1,440 2/3	85	75	3.47	790

== Awards and honors ==
1988 Major League Baseball All-Star Game

- Bobby Bonilla, 3B, starter
- Andy Van Slyke, OF, reserve
- Bob Walk, P, reserve

== Farm system ==
Level	Team	League	Manager
AAA	Buffalo Bisons	American Association	Rocky Bridges
AA	Harrisburg Senators	Eastern League	Dave Trembley
A	Salem Buccaneers	Carolina League	Jay Ward
A	Augusta Pirates	South Atlantic League	Jeff Cox and Woody Huyke
A-Short Season	Watertown Pirates	New York–Penn League	Stan Cliburn
Rookie	Princeton Pirates	Appalachian League	Jim Thrift
Rookie	GCL Pirates	Gulf Coast League	Julio Garcia
