= 1988 Montreal Expos season =

1988 Montreal Expos
- League: National League
- Division: East
- Ballpark: Olympic Stadium
- City: Montreal
- Record: 81–81
- Divisional place: 3rd
- Owners: Charles Bronfman
- General managers: Bill Stoneman, Dave Dombrowski
- Managers: Buck Rodgers
- Television: CBC Television (Dave Van Horne, Jim Fanning); The Sports Network (Ken Singleton, Jim Hughson); Télévision de Radio-Canada (Claude Raymond, Raymond Lebrun)
- Radio: CFCF (English) (Dave Van Horne, Jim Fanning, Rich Griffin); CKAC (French) (Jacques Doucet, Rodger Brulotte)

The 1988 Montreal Expos season was the 20th season in franchise history. The Expos finished in third place in the National League East at 81–81, 20 games behind the New York Mets.

== Offseason ==
- December 7, 1987: Dave Engle was signed as a free agent by the Expos.
- December 16, 1987: Bryn Smith was signed as a free agent by the Expos.
- December 18, 1987: Rex Hudler was signed as a free agent by the Expos.
- December 18, 1987: Dennis Martínez was signed as a free agent by the Expos.
- March 5, 1988: Otis Nixon was signed as a free agent by the Expos.
- March 24, 1988: Graig Nettles was purchased by the Expos from the Atlanta Braves.
- CFL quarterback Matt Dunigan retired from the Canadian Football League in 1988 and chased a childhood dream of professional baseball. Dunigan attended an open tryout with the Montreal Expos and was one of two players selected to sign a contract.

== Spring training ==
The Expos held spring training at West Palm Beach Municipal Stadium in West Palm Beach, Florida – a facility they shared with the Atlanta Braves. It was their 12th season at the stadium; they had conducted spring training there from 1969 to 1972 and since 1981.

== Regular season ==
=== Opening Day starters ===
- Hubie Brooks
- Tom Foley
- Andrés Galarraga
- Dennis Martínez
- Tim Raines
- Jeff Reed
- Luis Rivera
- Tim Wallach
- Mitch Webster

Expos pitcher Pascual Pérez threw a five-inning rain-shortened no-hitter against the Phillies on September 24, 1988. It was the first no-hitter in Veterans Stadium history. Perez allowed one walk, and another Phillies baserunner reached on an error. Umpire Harry Wendelstedt waved off the game after a 90-minute rain delay after the game was stopped by a steady rain with one out in the top of the sixth. However, due to a statistical rule change in 1991, no-hitters must last at least nine innings to count. As a result of the retroactive application of the new rule, this game and thirty-five others are no longer considered no-hitters.

=== Season standings ===
NL East
Team	W	L	Pct.	GB	Home	Road
New York Mets	100	60	.625	—	56‍–‍24	44‍–‍36
Pittsburgh Pirates	85	75	.531	15	43‍–‍38	42‍–‍37
Montreal Expos	81	81	.500	20	43‍–‍38	38‍–‍43
Chicago Cubs	77	85	.475	24	39‍–‍42	38‍–‍43
St. Louis Cardinals	76	86	.469	25	41‍–‍40	35‍–‍46
Philadelphia Phillies	65	96	.404	35½	38‍–‍42	27‍–‍54

=== Record vs. opponents ===
1988 National League record Sources:
Team	ATL	CHC	CIN	HOU	LAD	MON	NYM	PHI	PIT	SD	SF	STL
Atlanta	—	5–7	5–13	5–13	4–14	4–8	4–8	6–6	5–5	8–10	5–13	3–9
Chicago	7–5	—	6–6	7–5	4–8–1	9–9	9–9	8–10	7–11	8–4	5–7	7–11
Cincinnati	13–5	6–6	—	9–9	7–11	5–7	4–7	9–3	7–5	10–8	11–7	6–6
Houston	13–5	5–7	9–9	—	9–9	6–6	5–7	8–4	8–4	6–12	7–11	6–6
Los Angeles	14–4	8–4–1	11–7	9–9	—	8–4	1–10	11–1	6–6	7–11	12–6	7–5
Montreal	8–4	9–9	7–5	6–6	4–8	—	6–12	9–9–1	8–10	4–8	7–5	13–5
New York	8–4	9–9	7–4	7–5	10–1	12–6	—	10–8	12–6	7–5	4–8	14–4
Philadelphia	6-6	10–8	3–9	4–8	1–11	9–9–1	8–10	—	7–11	4–7	7–5	6–12
Pittsburgh	5–5	11–7	5–7	4–8	6–6	10–8	6–12	11–7	—	8–4	8–4	11–7
San Diego	10–8	4–8	8–10	12–6	11–7	8–4	5–7	7–4	4–8	—	8–10	6–6
San Francisco	13–5	7–5	7–11	11–7	6–12	5–7	8–4	5–7	4–8	10–8	—	7–5
St. Louis	9–3	11–7	6–6	6–6	5–7	5–13	4–14	12–6	7–11	6–6	5–7	—

=== Notable transactions ===
- July 13, 1988: Jeff Reed, Herm Winningham, and Randy St. Claire were traded by the Expos to the Cincinnati Reds for Tracy Jones and Pat Pacillo.
- July 14, 1988: Dave Engle was released by the Expos.
- July 14, 1988: Mitch Webster was traded by the Expos to the Chicago Cubs for Dave Martinez.
- July 23, 1988: Casey Candaele was traded by the Expos to the Houston Astros for Mark Bailey.
- September 1, 1988: The Expos traded a player to be named later to the Texas Rangers for Tom O'Malley. The Expos completed the deal by sending Jack Daugherty to the Rangers on September 13.

==== Draft picks ====
- June 1, 1988: 1988 Major League Baseball draft
  - Marquis Grissom was drafted by the Expos in the 3rd round. Player signed June 13, 1988.
  - Bret Barberie was drafted by the Montreal Expos in the 7th round.

=== Major League debuts ===
- Batters:
  - Jeff Huson (Sep 2)
  - Johnny Paredes (Apr 29)
- Pitchers:
  - Tim Barrett (Jul 18)
  - Brian Holman (Jun 25)
  - Randy Johnson (Sep 15)

=== Roster ===
1988 Montreal Expos
Roster
Pitchers: 50 Tim Barrett; 44 Tim Burke; 54 John Dopson; 26 Neal Heaton; 38 Joe Hesketh; 59 Brian Holman; 51 Randy Johnson; 32 Dennis Martínez; 22 Bob McClure; 27 Andy McGaffigan; 49 Jeff Parrett; 34 Pascual Pérez; 39 Rich Sauveur; 28 Bryn Smith; 43 Mike Smith; 51 Randy St. Claire; 17 Floyd Youmans	Catchers: 4 Dave Engle; 20 Mike Fitzgerald; 24 Jeff Reed; 47 Nelson Santovenia; 11 Wilfredo Tejada; Infielders: 5 Casey Candaele; 16 Tom Foley; 14 Andrés Galarraga; 25 Rex Hudler; 15 Jeff Huson; 6 Wallace Johnson; 9 Graig Nettles; 23 Tom O'Malley; 5 Johnny Paredes; 12 Luis Rivera; 29 Tim Wallach	Outfielders: 7 Hubie Brooks; 24 Tracy Jones; 3 Dave Martinez; 35 Otis Nixon; 30 Tim Raines; 23 Mitch Webster; 3 Herm Winningham	Manager: 37 Buck Rodgers; Coaches: 36 Larry Bearnarth (Pitching); 19 Leonel Carrión (Assistant); 18 Ron Hansen (Hitting); 31 Ken Macha (Bullpen); 42 Jackie Moore (Third Base); 1 Bobby Winkles (First Base)

== Player stats ==
= Indicates team leader

=== Batting ===
==== Starters by position ====
Note: Pos = Position; G = Games played; AB = At bats; H = Hits; Avg. = Batting average; HR = Home runs; RBI = Runs batted in; SB = Stolen bases

Pos	Player	G	AB	H	Avg.	HR	RBI	SB
C	Nelson Santovenia	92	309	73	.236	8	41	2
1B	Andrés Galarraga	157	609	184	.302	29	92	13
2B	Tom Foley	127	377	100	.265	5	43	2
SS	Luis Rivera	123	371	83	.224	4	30	3
3B	Tim Wallach	159	592	152	.257	12	69	2
LF	Tim Raines	109	429	116	.270	12	48	33
CF	Mitch Webster	81	259	66	.255	2	13	12
RF	Hubie Brooks	151	588	164	.279	20	90	7

==== Other batters ====
Note: G = Games played; AB = At bats; H = Hits; Avg. = Batting average; HR = Home runs; RBI = Runs batted in; SB = Stolen bases

Player	G	AB	H	Avg.	HR	RBI	SB
Otis Nixon	90	271	66	.244	0	15	46
Rex Hudler	77	216	59	.273	4	14	29
Dave Martinez	63	191	49	.257	2	12	16
Mike Fitzgerald	63	155	42	.271	5	23	2
Tracy Jones	53	141	47	.333	2	15	9
Jeff Reed	43	123	27	.220	0	9	1
Casey Candaele	36	116	20	.172	0	4	1
Wallace Johnson	86	94	29	.309	0	3	0
Graig Nettles	80	93	16	.172	1	14	0
Johnny Paredes	35	91	17	.187	1	10	5
Herm Winningham	47	90	21	.233	0	6	4
Jeff Huson	20	42	13	.310	0	3	2
Dave Engle	34	37	8	.216	0	1	0
Tom O'Malley	14	27	7	.259	0	2	0
Wilfredo Tejada	8	15	4	.267	0	2	0

=== Pitching ===
==== Starting pitchers ====
Note: G = Games pitched; IP = Innings pitched; W = Wins; L = Losses; ERA = Earned run average; SO = Strikeouts

Player	G	IP	W	L	ERA	SO
Dennis Martínez	34	235.1	15	13	2.72	120
Bryn Smith	32	198.0	12	10	3.00	122
Pascual Pérez	27	188.0	12	8	2.44	131
John Dopson	26	168.2	3	11	3.04	101
Brian Holman	18	100.1	4	8	3.23	58
Floyd Youmans	14	84.0	3	6	3.21	54
Randy Johnson	4	26.0	4	0	2.42	25

==== Other pitchers ====
Note: G = Games pitched; IP = Innings pitched; W = Wins; L = Losses; ERA = Earned run average; SO = Strikeouts

Player	G	IP	W	L	ERA	SO
Neal Heaton	32	97.1	3	10	4.99	43

==== Relief pitchers ====
Note: G = Games pitched; W = Wins; L = Losses; SV = Saves; ERA = Earned run average; SO = Strikeouts

Player	G	W	L	SV	ERA	SO
Tim Burke	61	3	5	18	3.40	42
Andy McGaffigan	63	6	0	4	2.76	71
Jeff Parrett	61	12	4	6	2.65	62
Joe Hesketh	60	4	3	9	2.85	64
Bob McClure	19	1	3	2	6.16	12
Randy St. Claire	6	0	0	0	6.14	6
Mike Smith	5	0	0	1	3.12	4
Tim Barrett	4	0	0	1	5.79	5
Rich Sauveur	4	0	0	0	6.00	3

== Award winners ==
- Tim Wallach, Gold Glove Award

1988 Major League Baseball All-Star Game

- Andrés Galarraga, first base, reserve

== Farm system ==
Level	Team	League	Manager
AAA	Indianapolis Indians	American Association	Joe Sparks
AA	Jacksonville Expos	Southern League	Tommy Thompson
A	West Palm Beach Expos	Florida State League	Felipe Alou
A	Rockford Expos	Midwest League	Alan Bannister
A-Short Season	Jamestown Expos	New York–Penn League	Roger LaFrancois
Rookie	GCL Expos	Gulf Coast League	Dave Jauss

LEAGUE CHAMPIONS: Indianapolis
