= 1988 Chicago Cubs season =

1988 Chicago Cubs
- League: National League
- Division: East
- Ballpark: Wrigley Field
- City: Chicago
- Record: 77–85 (.475)
- Divisional place: 4th
- Owners: Tribune Company
- General managers: Jim Frey
- Managers: Don Zimmer
- Television: WGN-TV/Superstation WGN (Harry Caray, Steve Stone, Dewayne Staats)
- Radio: WGN (Dewayne Staats, Dave Nelson, Harry Caray)
- Stats: ESPN.com; Baseball Reference

The 1988 Chicago Cubs season was the 117th season of the Chicago Cubs franchise, the 113th in the National League and the 73rd at Wrigley Field. The Cubs finished fourth in the National League East with a record of 77–85, 24 games behind the New York Mets.

The first game under lights at Wrigley Field was on August 8 (8/8/88), against the Philadelphia Phillies. With the Cubs leading 3–1, in the middle of the 4th inning, a powerful thunderstorm rolled in. The game was suspended, and finally called at 10:25PM. Since the rules of Major League Baseball state that a game is not official unless 5 innings are completed, the first official night game in the history of Wrigley Field was played on August 9, when the Cubs defeated the New York Mets 6 to 4.

== Offseason ==
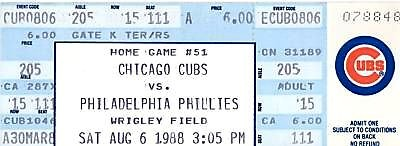
A ticket from the game where Cubs' reliever Goose Gossage earned his 300th career save on August 6, 1988.

- October 23, 1987: Dickie Noles was returned to the Chicago Cubs by the Detroit Tigers as part of earlier loan.
- December 8, 1987: Lee Smith was traded by the Chicago Cubs to the Boston Red Sox for Al Nipper and Calvin Schiraldi.
- December 14, 1987: Vance Law was signed as a free agent with the Chicago Cubs.
- February 12, 1988: Goose Gossage was traded by the San Diego Padres with Ray Hayward to the Chicago Cubs for Keith Moreland and Mike Brumley.
- March 31, 1988: Mike Bielecki was traded by the Pittsburgh Pirates to the Chicago Cubs for Mike Curtis (minors).

== Regular season ==
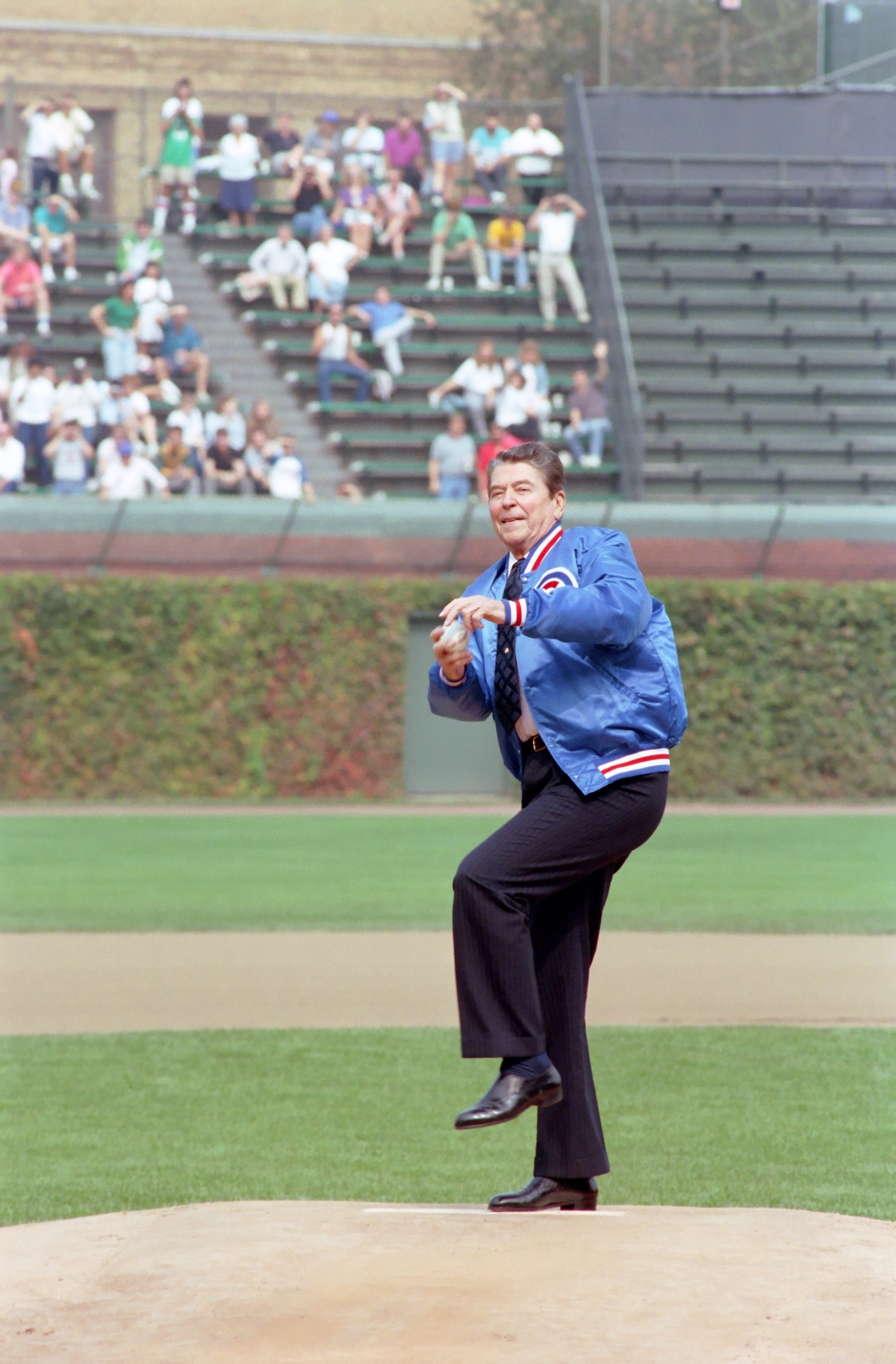
President Ronald Reagan throwing out the first pitch for the first 1988 Chicago Cubs game

President of the United States Ronald Reagan threw out the ceremonial first pitch on September 30 at Wrigley Field.

After 5,687 consecutive day games played by the Cubs at Wrigley, the lights were finally lit on August 8, 1988, when 91-year-old fan Harry Grossman gave a countdown and pressed a button, for a game with the Philadelphia Phillies. The game began before an announced crowd of 39,008. The Cubs were leading 3 to 1 and coming to bat in the bottom of the fourth when the rain delay began. The umpires called the game after waiting two hours, ten minutes. The Cubs played the first official night game the following night against the Mets and won, 6–4.

=== Season standings ===
NL East
Team	W	L	Pct.	GB	Home	Road
New York Mets	100	60	.625	—	56‍–‍24	44‍–‍36
Pittsburgh Pirates	85	75	.531	15	43‍–‍38	42‍–‍37
Montreal Expos	81	81	.500	20	43‍–‍38	38‍–‍43
Chicago Cubs	77	85	.475	24	39‍–‍42	38‍–‍43
St. Louis Cardinals	76	86	.469	25	41‍–‍40	35‍–‍46
Philadelphia Phillies	65	96	.404	35½	38‍–‍42	27‍–‍54

=== Record vs. opponents ===
1988 National League record Sources:
Team	ATL	CHC	CIN	HOU	LAD	MON	NYM	PHI	PIT	SD	SF	STL
Atlanta	—	5–7	5–13	5–13	4–14	4–8	4–8	6–6	5–5	8–10	5–13	3–9
Chicago	7–5	—	6–6	7–5	4–8–1	9–9	9–9	8–10	7–11	8–4	5–7	7–11
Cincinnati	13–5	6–6	—	9–9	7–11	5–7	4–7	9–3	7–5	10–8	11–7	6–6
Houston	13–5	5–7	9–9	—	9–9	6–6	5–7	8–4	8–4	6–12	7–11	6–6
Los Angeles	14–4	8–4–1	11–7	9–9	—	8–4	1–10	11–1	6–6	7–11	12–6	7–5
Montreal	8–4	9–9	7–5	6–6	4–8	—	6–12	9–9–1	8–10	4–8	7–5	13–5
New York	8–4	9–9	7–4	7–5	10–1	12–6	—	10–8	12–6	7–5	4–8	14–4
Philadelphia	6-6	10–8	3–9	4–8	1–11	9–9–1	8–10	—	7–11	4–7	7–5	6–12
Pittsburgh	5–5	11–7	5–7	4–8	6–6	10–8	6–12	11–7	—	8–4	8–4	11–7
San Diego	10–8	4–8	8–10	12–6	11–7	8–4	5–7	7–4	4–8	—	8–10	6–6
San Francisco	13–5	7–5	7–11	11–7	6–12	5–7	8–4	5–7	4–8	10–8	—	7–5
St. Louis	9–3	11–7	6–6	6–6	5–7	5–13	4–14	12–6	7–11	6–6	5–7	—

=== Notable transactions ===
- July 14, 1988: Dave Martinez was traded by the Cubs to the Montreal Expos for Mitch Webster.
- July 15, 1988: Jim Sundberg was released by the Chicago Cubs.

== Roster ==
1988 Chicago Cubs
Roster
Pitchers: 36 Mike Bielecki; 51 Kevin Blankenship; 38 Mike Capel; 33 Frank DiPino; 54 Goose Gossage; 44 Drew Hall; 48 Mike Harkey; 50 Les Lancaster; 47 Bill Landrum; 31 Greg Maddux; 49 Jamie Moyer; 45 Al Nipper; 37 Pat Perry; 39 Jeff Pico; 21 Scott Sanderson; 32 Calvin Schiraldi; 40 Rick Sutcliffe; 42 Bob Tewksbury	Catchers: 9 Damon Berryhill; 7 Jody Davis; 11 Jim Sundberg; 1 Rick Wrona; Infielders: 12 Shawon Dunston; 10 Leon Durham; 17,28 Mark Grace; 2 Vance Law; 20 Dave Meier; 18 Argenis Salazar; 23 Ryne Sandberg; 19 Manny Trillo	Outfielders: 29 Doug Dascenzo; 8 Andre Dawson; 30 Darrin Jackson; 1 Dave Martinez; 22 Jerry Mumphrey; 25 Rafael Palmeiro; 27 Rolando Roomes; 24 Gary Varsho; 28 Mitch Webster	Manager: 4 Don Zimmer; Coaches: 6 Joe Altobelli; 5 Chuck Cottier; 35 Larry Cox; 3 José Martínez; 34 Dick Pole

== Player stats ==
= Indicates team leader

=== Batting ===
==== Starters by position ====
Note: Pos = Position; G = Games played; AB = At bats; H = Hits; Avg. = Batting average; HR = Home runs; RBI = Runs batted in

Pos	Player	G	AB	H	Avg.	HR	RBI
C	Damon Berryhill	98	309	80	.259	7	38
1B	Mark Grace	134	486	144	.296	7	57
2B	Ryne Sandberg	155	618	163	.264	19	69
SS	Shawon Dunston	155	575	143	.249	9	56
3B	Vance Law	151	556	163	.293	11	78
LF	Rafael Palmeiro	152	580	178	.307	8	53
CF	Dave Martinez	75	256	65	.254	4	34
RF	Andre Dawson	157	591	179	.303	24	79

==== Other batters ====
Note: G = Games played; AB = At bats; H = Hits; Avg. = Batting average; HR = Home runs; RBI = Runs batted in

Player	G	AB	H	Avg.	HR	RBI
Mitch Webster	70	264	70	.265	4	26
Jody Davis	88	249	57	.229	6	33
Darrin Jackson	100	188	50	.266	6	20
Manny Trillo	76	164	41	.250	1	14
Doug Dascenzo	26	75	16	.213	0	4
Leon Durham	24	73	16	.219	3	6
Gary Varsho	46	73	20	.274	0	5
Jerry Mumphrey	63	66	9	.136	0	9
Ángel Salazar	34	60	15	.250	0	1
Jim Sundberg	24	54	13	.241	2	9
Rolando Roomes	17	16	3	.188	0	0
Rick Wrona	4	6	0	.000	0	0
Dave Meier	2	5	2	.400	0	1

=== Pitching ===
==== Starting pitchers ====
Note: G = Games pitched; IP = Innings pitched; W = Wins; L = Losses; ERA = Earned run average; SO = Strikeouts

Player	G	IP	W	L	ERA	SO
Greg Maddux	34	249.0	18	8	3.18	140
Rick Sutcliffe	32	226.0	13	14	3.86	144
Jamie Moyer	34	202.0	9	15	3.48	121
Calvin Schiraldi	29	166.1	9	13	4.38	140
Mike Harkey	5	34.2	0	3	2.60	18
Kevin Blankenship	1	5.0	1	0	7.20	4
Bob Tewksbury	1	3.1	0	0	8.10	1

==== Other pitchers ====
Note: G = Games pitched; IP = Innings pitched; W = Wins; L = Losses; ERA = Earned run average; SO = Strikeouts

Player	G	IP	W	L	ERA	SO
Jeff Pico	29	112.2	6	7	4.15	57
Al Nipper	22	80.0	2	4	3.04	27
Mike Bielecki	19	48.1	2	2	3.35	33

==== Relief pitchers ====
Note: G = Games pitched; W = Wins; L = Losses; SV = Saves; ERA = Earned run average; SO = Strikeouts

Player	G	W	L	SV	ERA	SO
Rich Gossage	46	4	4	13	4.33	30
Frank DiPino	63	2	3	6	4.98	69
Les Lancaster	44	4	6	5	3.78	36
Pat Perry	35	2	2	1	3.32	24
Mike Capel	22	2	1	0	4.91	19
Drew Hall	19	1	1	1	7.66	22
Scott Sanderson	11	1	2	0	5.28	6
Bill Landrum	7	1	0	0	5.84	6

== Awards and honors ==
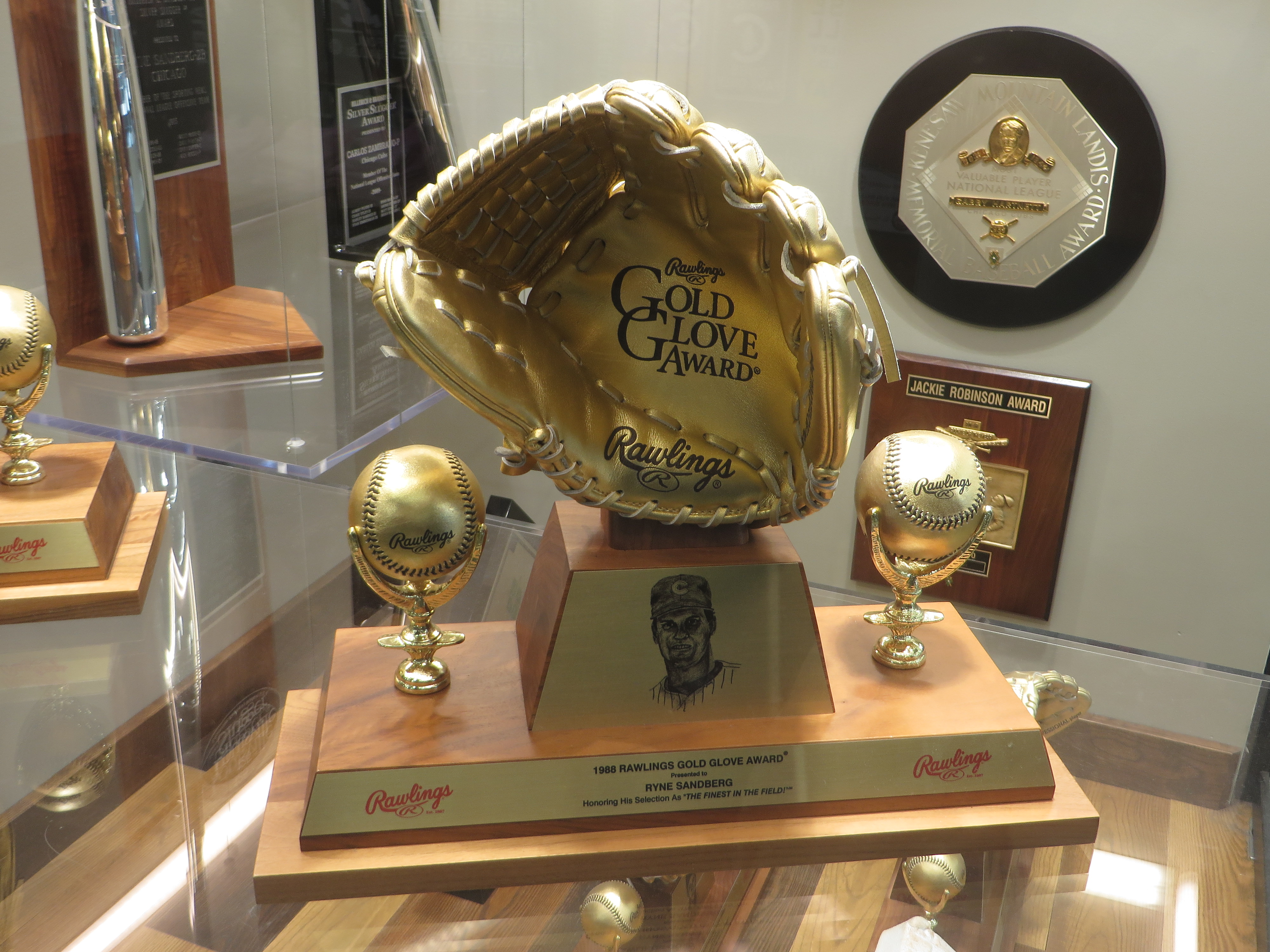
1988 Gold Glove Award trophy, received by Sandberg

- Ryne Sandberg, Gold Glove Award

All-Star Game

- Ryne Sandberg, 2B, Starter
- Andre Dawson, OF, Starter
- Shawon Dunston, SS, Reserve
- Vance Law, 3B, Reserve
- Greg Maddux, Pitcher, Reserve
- Rafael Palmeiro, OF, Reserve

== Farm system ==
Level	Team	League	Manager
AAA	Iowa Cubs	American Association	Pete Mackanin
AA	Pittsfield Cubs	Eastern League	Jim Essian
A	Winston-Salem Spirits	Carolina League	Jay Loviglio
A	Peoria Chiefs	Midwest League	Jim Tracy
A	Charleston Wheelers	South Atlantic League	Brad Mills
A-Short Season	Geneva Cubs	New York–Penn League	Bill Hayes
Rookie	Wytheville Cubs	Appalachian League	Steve Roadcap
