= 1988 St. Louis Cardinals season =

Major League Baseball season

1988 St. Louis Cardinals
- League: National League
- Division: East
- Ballpark: Busch Memorial Stadium
- City: St. Louis, Missouri
- Record: 76–86 (.469)
- Divisional place: 5th
- Owners: August "Gussie" Busch
- General managers: Dal Maxvill
- Managers: Whitey Herzog
- Television: KPLR-TV (Al Hrabosky, Ken Wilson); Cardinal Cable Network (Al Hrabosky, Ken Wilson)
- Radio: KMOX (Jack Buck, Mike Shannon)

The 1988 St. Louis Cardinals season was the team's 107th season in St. Louis, Missouri and its 97th season in the National League. The Cardinals went 76–86 during the season and finished fifth in the National League East division.

== Offseason ==
- October 7, 1987: Doug DeCinces was released by the Cardinals.
- February 9, 1988: Lance Johnson, Ricky Horton and cash were traded by the Cardinals to the Chicago White Sox for José DeLeón.

== Regular season ==
Shortstop Ozzie Smith won a Gold Glove this year.

=== Season standings ===
NL East
Team	W	L	Pct.	GB	Home	Road
New York Mets	100	60	.625	—	56‍–‍24	44‍–‍36
Pittsburgh Pirates	85	75	.531	15	43‍–‍38	42‍–‍37
Montreal Expos	81	81	.500	20	43‍–‍38	38‍–‍43
Chicago Cubs	77	85	.475	24	39‍–‍42	38‍–‍43
St. Louis Cardinals	76	86	.469	25	41‍–‍40	35‍–‍46
Philadelphia Phillies	65	96	.404	35½	38‍–‍42	27‍–‍54

=== Record vs. opponents ===
1988 National League record Sources:
Team	ATL	CHC	CIN	HOU	LAD	MON	NYM	PHI	PIT	SD	SF	STL
Atlanta	—	5–7	5–13	5–13	4–14	4–8	4–8	6–6	5–5	8–10	5–13	3–9
Chicago	7–5	—	6–6	7–5	4–8–1	9–9	9–9	8–10	7–11	8–4	5–7	7–11
Cincinnati	13–5	6–6	—	9–9	7–11	5–7	4–7	9–3	7–5	10–8	11–7	6–6
Houston	13–5	5–7	9–9	—	9–9	6–6	5–7	8–4	8–4	6–12	7–11	6–6
Los Angeles	14–4	8–4–1	11–7	9–9	—	8–4	1–10	11–1	6–6	7–11	12–6	7–5
Montreal	8–4	9–9	7–5	6–6	4–8	—	6–12	9–9–1	8–10	4–8	7–5	13–5
New York	8–4	9–9	7–4	7–5	10–1	12–6	—	10–8	12–6	7–5	4–8	14–4
Philadelphia	6-6	10–8	3–9	4–8	1–11	9–9–1	8–10	—	7–11	4–7	7–5	6–12
Pittsburgh	5–5	11–7	5–7	4–8	6–6	10–8	6–12	11–7	—	8–4	8–4	11–7
San Diego	10–8	4–8	8–10	12–6	11–7	8–4	5–7	7–4	4–8	—	8–10	6–6
San Francisco	13–5	7–5	7–11	11–7	6–12	5–7	8–4	5–7	4–8	10–8	—	7–5
St. Louis	9–3	11–7	6–6	6–6	5–7	5–13	4–14	12–6	7–11	6–6	5–7	—

=== Notable transactions ===
- April 22, 1988: Tom Herr was traded by the Cardinals to the Minnesota Twins for Tom Brunansky.
- June 1, 1988: Mark Clark was drafted by the Cardinals in the 9th round of the 1988 Major League Baseball draft. Player signed June 3, 1988.
- August 31, 1988: Bob Forsch was traded by the Cardinals to the Houston Astros for Denny Walling.

=== Roster ===
1988 St. Louis Cardinals
Roster
Pitchers: 61,47 Gibson Alba; 41 Scott Arnold; 44 Cris Carpenter; 50 John Costello; 34 Danny Cox; 46 Ken Dayley; 48 José DeLeón; 31 Bob Forsch; 56,43 Ken Hill; 41 Joe Magrane; 53 Greg Mathews; 49 Larry McWilliams; 39 Randy O'Neal; 36 Steve Peters; 28,40 Dan Quisenberry; 37 Scott Terry; 30 John Tudor; 38 Todd Worrell	Catchers: 25 Steve Lake; 19 Tom Pagnozzi; 26 Tony Peña; Infielders: 18 Luis Alicea; 10 Rod Booker; 47 Mike Fitzgerald; 28 Pedro Guerrero; 28 Tom Herr; 5 Bob Horner; 22 Tim Jones; 35 Mike Laga; 12 Tom Lawless; 11 José Oquendo; 9 Terry Pendleton; 1 Ozzie Smith	Outfielders: 23 Tom Brunansky; 29 Vince Coleman; 27 Curt Ford; 15 Jim Lindeman; 51 Willie McGee; 33 John Morris; 21 Duane Walker; 21 Denny Walling	Manager: 24 Whitey Herzog; Coaches: 7 Rich Hacker (First base); 8 Johnny Lewis (Hitting); 16 Nick Leyva (Third base); 3 Dave Ricketts (Bullpen); 4 Mike Roarke (Pitching); 2 Red Schoendienst (Bench)

== Player stats ==
=== Batting ===
==== Starters by position ====
Note: Pos = Position; G = Games played; AB = At bats; H = Hits; Avg. = Batting average; HR = Home runs; RBI = Runs batted in

Pos	Player	G	AB	H	Avg.	HR	RBI
C	Tony Peña	149	505	133	.263	10	51
1B	Bob Horner	60	206	53	.257	3	33
2B	Luis Alicea	93	297	63	.212	1	24
SS	Ozzie Smith	153	575	155	.270	3	51
3B	Terry Pendleton	110	391	99	.253	6	53
LF	Vince Coleman	153	616	160	.260	3	38
CF	Willie McGee	137	562	164	.292	3	50
RF	Tom Brunansky	143	523	128	.245	22	79

==== Other batters ====
Note: G = Games played; AB = At bats; H = Hits; Avg. = Batting average; HR = Home runs; RBI = Runs batted in

Player	G	AB	H	Avg.	HR	RBI
José Oquendo	148	451	125	.277	7	46
Tom Pagnozzi	81	195	55	.282	0	15
Pedro Guerrero	44	149	40	.268	5	30
Curt Ford	91	128	25	.195	1	18
Mike Laga	41	100	13	.130	1	4
Tom Lawless	54	65	10	.154	1	3
Denny Walling	19	58	13	.224	0	1
Steve Lake	36	54	15	.278	1	4
Tim Jones	31	52	14	.269	0	3
Tom Herr	15	50	13	.260	1	3
Mike Fitzgerald	13	46	9	.196	0	1
Jim Lindeman	17	43	9	.209	2	7
John Morris	20	38	11	.289	0	3
Rod Booker	18	35	12	.343	0	3
Duane Walker	24	22	4	.182	0	3

=== Pitching ===
==== Starting pitchers ====
Note: G = Games pitched; IP = Innings pitched; W = Wins; L = Losses; ERA = Earned run average; SO = Strikeouts

Player	G	IP	W	L	ERA	SO
José DeLeón	34	225.1	13	10	3.67	208
Joe Magrane	24	165.1	5	9	2.18	100
John Tudor	21	145.1	6	5	2.29	55
Danny Cox	13	86.0	3	8	3.98	47
Greg Mathews	13	68.0	4	6	4.24	31
Randy O'Neal	10	53.0	2	3	4.58	20
Cris Carpenter	8	47.2	2	3	4.72	24

==== Other pitchers ====
Note: G = Games pitched; IP = Innings pitched; W = Wins; L = Losses; ERA = Earned run average; SO = Strikeouts

Player	G	IP	W	L	ERA	SO
Larry McWilliams	42	136.0	6	9	3.90	70
Scott Terry	51	129.1	9	6	2.92	65
Bob Forsch	30	108.2	9	4	3.73	40
Ken Hill	4	14.0	0	1	5.14	6

==== Relief pitchers ====
Note: G = Games pitched; W = Wins; L = Losses; SV = Saves; ERA = Earned run average; SO = Strikeouts

Player	G	W	L	SV	ERA	SO
Todd Worrell	68	5	9	32	3.00	78
Ken Dayley	54	2	7	5	2.77	38
Steve Peters	44	3	3	0	6.40	30
John Costello	36	5	2	1	1.81	38
Dan Quisenberry	33	2	0	0	6.16	19
Scott Arnold	6	0	0	0	5.40	8
Gibson Alba	3	0	0	0	2.70	3
José Oquendo	1	0	1	0	4.50	1

== Awards and honors ==
- Ozzie Smith, Shortstop, National League Gold Glove

=== League leaders ===
- Vince Coleman, National League Stolen Base Leader, 81
- Joe Magrane, NL ERA leader, 2.18.

== Farm system ==
Level	Team	League	Manager
AAA	Louisville Redbirds	American Association	Mike Jorgensen
AA	Arkansas Travelers	Texas League	Jim Riggleman, Darold Knowles and Gaylen Pitts
A	St. Petersburg Cardinals	Florida State League	Dave Bialas
A	Springfield Cardinals	Midwest League	Mark DeJohn
A	Savannah Cardinals	South Atlantic League	Keith Champion
A-Short Season	Hamilton Redbirds	New York–Penn League	Dan Radison
Rookie	Johnson City Cardinals	Appalachian League	Gaylen Pitts and Jorge Aranzamendi
