= 1988 Atlanta Braves season =

1988 Atlanta Braves
- League: National League
- Division: West
- Ballpark: Atlanta–Fulton County Stadium
- City: Atlanta
- Record: 54–106 (.338)
- Divisional place: 6th
- Owners: Ted Turner
- General managers: Bobby Cox
- Managers: Chuck Tanner, Russ Nixon
- Television: WTBS; Superstation WTBS
- Radio: WSB (Ernie Johnson, Pete Van Wieren, Skip Caray, Billy Sample)

The 1988 Atlanta Braves season was the 118th in franchise history and their 23rd in Atlanta.

== Offseason ==
- November 13, 1987: Ken Griffey, Sr. was signed as a free agent by the Braves.
- December 6, 1987: Graig Nettles was signed as a free agent by the Braves.
- December 8, 1987: Ed Whited was traded by the Houston Astros with Mike Stoker (minors) to the Atlanta Braves for Rafael Ramirez and cash.
- March 24, 1988: Graig Nettles was purchased from the Braves by the Montreal Expos.

== Regular season ==
=== Season standings ===
NL West
Team	W	L	Pct.	GB	Home	Road
Los Angeles Dodgers	94	67	.584	—	45‍–‍36	49‍–‍31
Cincinnati Reds	87	74	.540	7	45‍–‍35	42‍–‍39
San Diego Padres	83	78	.516	11	47‍–‍34	36‍–‍44
San Francisco Giants	83	79	.512	11½	45‍–‍36	38‍–‍43
Houston Astros	82	80	.506	12½	44‍–‍37	38‍–‍43
Atlanta Braves	54	106	.338	39½	28‍–‍51	26‍–‍55

=== Record vs. opponents ===
1988 National League record Sources:
Team	ATL	CHC	CIN	HOU	LAD	MON	NYM	PHI	PIT	SD	SF	STL
Atlanta	—	5–7	5–13	5–13	4–14	4–8	4–8	6–6	5–5	8–10	5–13	3–9
Chicago	7–5	—	6–6	7–5	4–8–1	9–9	9–9	8–10	7–11	8–4	5–7	7–11
Cincinnati	13–5	6–6	—	9–9	7–11	5–7	4–7	9–3	7–5	10–8	11–7	6–6
Houston	13–5	5–7	9–9	—	9–9	6–6	5–7	8–4	8–4	6–12	7–11	6–6
Los Angeles	14–4	8–4–1	11–7	9–9	—	8–4	1–10	11–1	6–6	7–11	12–6	7–5
Montreal	8–4	9–9	7–5	6–6	4–8	—	6–12	9–9–1	8–10	4–8	7–5	13–5
New York	8–4	9–9	7–4	7–5	10–1	12–6	—	10–8	12–6	7–5	4–8	14–4
Philadelphia	6-6	10–8	3–9	4–8	1–11	9–9–1	8–10	—	7–11	4–7	7–5	6–12
Pittsburgh	5–5	11–7	5–7	4–8	6–6	10–8	6–12	11–7	—	8–4	8–4	11–7
San Diego	10–8	4–8	8–10	12–6	11–7	8–4	5–7	7–4	4–8	—	8–10	6–6
San Francisco	13–5	7–5	7–11	11–7	6–12	5–7	8–4	5–7	4–8	10–8	—	7–5
St. Louis	9–3	11–7	6–6	6–6	5–7	5–13	4–14	12–6	7–11	6–6	5–7	—

=== Notable transactions ===
- May 17, 1988: Jerry Royster was signed as a free agent with the Atlanta Braves.
- May 20, 1988: Melvin Nieves was signed by the Braves as an amateur free agent.
- June 1, 1988: 1988 Major League Baseball draft
  - Steve Avery was drafted by the Braves in the 1st round (3rd pick). Player signed June 30, 1988.
  - Turk Wendell was drafted by the Braves in the 5th round. Player signed June 4, 1988.
- July 28, 1988: Ken Griffey, Sr. was released by the Braves.

=== Roster ===
1988 Atlanta Braves
Roster
Pitchers: 38 Jim Acker; 40 Jose Alvarez; 30 Paul Assenmacher; 50 Kevin Blankenship; 37 Joe Boever; 36 Chuck Cary; 43 Kevin Coffman; 48 Gary Eave; 13 Juan Eichelberger; 47 Tom Glavine; 49 German Jiménez; 26 Rick Mahler; 31 Ed Olwine; 45 Charlie Puleo; 25 Pete Smith; 34 Zane Smith; 57,29 John Smoltz; 42 Bruce Sutter	Catchers: 20 Bruce Benedict; 8 Jody Davis; 9 Ozzie Virgil; Infielders: 32 Jeff Blauser; 5 Ron Gant; 18 Dámaso García; 17 Mark Lemke; 27 Jim Morrison; 24 Ken Oberkfell; 28 Gerald Perry; 12 Paul Runge; 23 Ted Simmons; 14 Andrés Thomas	Outfielders: 19,29 Terry Blocker; 16 Tommy Gregg; 22 Ken Griffey; 1 Albert Hall; 10 Dion James; 3 Dale Murphy; 15 Gary Roenicke; 4 Jerry Royster; 6 Lonnie Smith	Manager: 2 Russ Nixon; 7 Chuck Tanner; Coaches: 50 Tony Bartirome (Assistant); 39 Bruce Dal Canton (Pitching); 54 Clarence Jones (Hitting); 11 Roy Majtyka (Third Base); 52 Alex Monchak (Third Base); 4 Bob Skinner (Hitting); 55 Brian Snitker (Bullpen); 8 Willie Stargell (First Base); 7 Bobby Wine (First Base)

== Player stats ==
=== Batting ===
==== Starters by position ====
Note: Pos = Position; G = Games played; AB = At bats; H = Hits; Avg. = Batting average; HR = Home runs; RBI = Runs batted in

Pos	Player	G	AB	H	Avg.	HR	RBI
C	Ozzie Virgil, Jr.	107	320	82	.256	9	31
1B	Gerald Perry	141	547	164	.300	8	74
2B	Ron Gant	146	563	146	.259	19	60
3B	Ken Oberkfell	120	422	117	.277	3	40
SS	Andrés Thomas	153	606	153	.252	13	68
LF	Dion James	132	386	99	.256	3	60
CF	Terry Blocker	66	198	42	.212	2	10
RF	Dale Murphy	156	592	134	.226	24	77

==== Other batters ====
Note: G = Games played; AB = At bats; H = Hits; Avg. = Batting average; HR = Home runs; RBI = Runs batted in

Player	G	AB	H	Avg.	HR	RBI
Bruce Benedict	90	236	57	.242	0	19
Albert Hall	85	231	57	.247	1	15
Ken Griffey	69	193	48	.249	2	19
Lonnie Smith	43	114	27	.237	3	9
Gary Roenicke	49	114	26	.228	1	7
Ted Simmons	78	107	21	.196	2	11
Jerry Royster	68	102	18	.176	0	1
Jim Morrison	51	92	14	.152	2	13
Paul Runge	52	76	16	.211	0	7
Jeff Blauser	18	67	16	.239	2	7
Dámaso García	21	60	7	.117	1	4
Mark Lemke	16	58	13	.224	0	2
Tommy Gregg	11	29	10	.345	0	4
Jody Davis	2	8	2	.250	1	3

=== Pitching ===
==== Starting pitchers ====
Note: G = Games pitched; IP = Innings pitched; W = Wins; L = Losses; ERA = Earned run average; SO = Strikeouts

Player	G	IP	W	L	ERA	SO
Rick Mahler	39	249.0	9	16	3.69	131
Tom Glavine	34	195.1	7	17	4.56	84
Pete Smith	32	195.1	7	15	3.69	124
Zane Smith	23	140.1	5	10	4.30	59
John Smoltz	12	64.0	2	7	5.48	37
Kevin Blankenship	2	10.2	0	1	3.38	5

==== Other pitchers ====
Note: G = Games pitched; IP = Innings pitched; W = Wins; L = Losses; ERA = Earned run average; SO = Strikeouts

Player	G	IP	W	L	ERA	SO
Kevin Coffman	18	67.0	2	6	5.78	24
Germán Jiménez	15	55.2	1	6	5.01	26

==== Relief pitchers ====
Note: G = Games pitched; W = Wins; L = Losses; SV = Saves; ERA = Earned run average; SO = Strikeouts

Player	G	W	L	SV	ERA	SO
Bruce Sutter	38	1	4	14	4.76	40
Paul Assenmacher	64	8	7	5	3.06	71
Jose Alvarez	60	5	6	3	2.99	81
Charlie Puleo	53	5	5	1	3.47	70
Jim Acker	21	0	4	0	4.71	25
Juan Eichelberger	20	2	0	0	3.86	13
Joe Boever	16	0	2	1	1.77	7
Ed Olwine	16	0	0	1	6.75	5
Chuck Cary	7	0	0	0	6.48	7
Gary Eave	5	0	0	0	9.00	0
Jim Morrison	3	0	0	0	0.00	1

== Farm system ==
Level	Team	League	Manager
AAA	Richmond Braves	International League	Jim Beauchamp
AA	Greenville Braves	Southern League	Russ Nixon and Buddy Bailey
A	Durham Bulls	Carolina League	Buddy Bailey and Grady Little
A	Burlington Braves	Midwest League	Grady Little and Rick Albert
A	Sumter Braves	South Atlantic League	Ned Yost
Rookie	Pulaski Braves	Appalachian League	Cloyd Boyer
Rookie	GCL Braves	Gulf Coast League	Pedro González
Rookie	Idaho Falls Braves	Pioneer League	Jim Procopio

== Awards and honors ==
- Dale Murphy, Roberto Clemente Award
