= Mike Fitzgerald (first baseman) =

American baseball player (born 1964)

- First baseman
- Born: March 28, 1964 (age 62); Savannah, Georgia, U.S.
- Batted: Right Threw: Right

MLB debut
- June 23, 1988, for the St. Louis Cardinals

Last MLB appearance
- July 10, 1988, for the St. Louis Cardinals

MLB statistics
- Batting average: .196
- Home runs: 0
- Runs batted in: 1
- Stats at Baseball Reference

Teams
- St. Louis Cardinals (1988)

Michael Patrick Fitzgerald (born March 28, 1964) is an American former professional baseball first baseman. He played in Major League Baseball (MLB) for the St. Louis Cardinals.

== Career ==
Fitzgerald was drafted by the St. Louis Cardinals in the first round (20th overall) of the 1984 June Secondary amateur draft. In 1986, Fitzgerald led the Single–A Springfield Cardinals with 147 hits, 29 doubles, 19 home runs, 93 RBIs, and a league-leading 17 game-winning RBIs. He appeared in 13 games for the 1988 St. Louis Cardinals.

== Personal life ==
Fitzgerald's son, Tyler is a Major League Baseball infielder, currently with a minor league team of the Los Angeles Dodgers organization.
