= Ángel Escobar =

Venezuelan baseball player (born 1965)

- Shortstop
- Born: May 12, 1965 (age 60); La Sabana, Vargas State, Venezuela
- Batted: Switch Threw: Right

MLB debut
- May 17, 1988, for the San Francisco Giants

Last MLB appearance
- May 26, 1988, for the San Francisco Giants

MLB statistics
- Games played: 3
- At bats: 3
- Runs: 1
- Hits: 1
- Batting average: .333
- Stats at Baseball Reference

Teams
- San Francisco Giants (1988)

Ángel Rubén Escobar Rivas (born May 12, 1965) is a Venezuelan former shortstop and switch hitter in Major League Baseball who played for the San Francisco Giants in its 1988 season.

Escobar hit .333 (1-for-3) with one run scored in three games.

== See also ==
- List of players from Venezuela in Major League Baseball
