= Brad Moore =

American baseball player (born 1964)

- Pitcher
- Born: June 21, 1964; Loveland, Colorado
- Batted: Right Threw: Right

MLB debut
- June 14, 1988, for the Philadelphia Phillies

Last MLB appearance
- April 25, 1990, for the Philadelphia Phillies

MLB statistics
- Win–loss record: 0–0
- Earned run average: 1.08
- Strikeouts: 3

CPBL statistics
- Win–loss record: 0–1
- Earned run average: 20.25
- Strikeouts: 0
- Stats at Baseball Reference

Teams
- Philadelphia Phillies (1988, 1990); Wei Chuan Dragons (1994)

Bradley Alan Moore (born June 21, 1964) is an American former professional baseball pitcher. He played in Major League Baseball (MLB) for the Philadelphia Phillies in parts of two seasons, 1988 and 1990.

== Career ==
As a junior at Loveland High School in Loveland, Colorado, Moore was only 5 feet 3 inches (1.60 m) and 115 pounds (52 kg). He was not drafted or offered any scholarships out of high school. After working as a landscaper and playing amateur baseball for a year after high school, he joined the college baseball team at Garden City Community College in Garden City, Kansas. By the end of his time at Garden City, he stood 6 feet 1 inch (1.85 m). Moore then received a scholarship to play baseball at Grand Canyon University. He led the team in pitching appearances in 1986 en route to a victory in the NAIA World Series. He was described in The Oklahoman during that season as the team's "bullpen ace."

Moore was undrafted out of Grand Canyon and joined the Philadelphia Phillies organization after attending an open tryout at Cherry Creek High School in Colorado. He was assigned to the Bend Phillies of the Northwest League to begin his professional career in 1986. In June 1988, he was promoted directly from Double-A to the National League. He made his major league debut on June 14, 1988, against the Montreal Expos at Veterans Stadium. He pitched 2 2/3 scoreless innings in relief of Bruce Ruffin. All three innings were ended by double plays started by Phillies second baseman Juan Samuel. Moore pitched in four more games with the Phillies that season without surrendering a run. Moore spent the entire 1989 season in the minors before returning to the majors with the Phillies in 1990. He pitched in three games in relief, all in April. It would be his final action at the major league level. He was demoted to Triple-A on May 1.

Prior to the 1991 season, Moore signed with the New York Mets. In 1992, the Mets invited him to participate in spring training but reassigned him to the minor leagues in late March.

Moore spent the 1993 and 1994 seasons in the farm systems of the Cincinnati Reds and Pittsburgh Pirates, respectively. His final stop as a professional player came with the Wei Chuan Dragons of the Chinese Professional Baseball League in Taiwan in 1994.

After his playing career, Moore became the pitching coach at Mountain View High School in Loveland, Colorado in 2006. He stayed in that role through the 2021 season.

== Personal life ==
Moore was one of several sons born to Barbara and Lew Moore.

Moore met his wife in 1987 at a parade in Clearwater, Florida while she was a waitress and he was playing for the Clearwater Phillies. Their son, Logan, was born in Scranton, Pennsylvania in August 1990 while Moore was playing with the Scranton/Wilkes-Barre Red Barons. Logan was selected by the Phillies in the ninth round of the 2011 MLB draft. He reached Triple-A and later played in the Mexican League, primarily as a catcher.
