= David Palmer (baseball) =

American baseball player (born 1957)

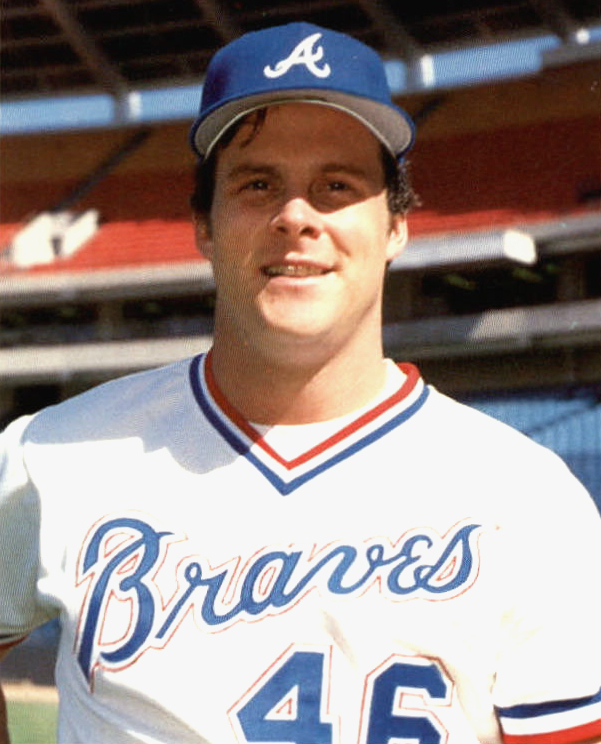
- Palmer with Atlanta Braves c. 1986
- Pitcher
- Born: October 19, 1957 (age 68); Glens Falls, New York, U.S.
- Batted: Right Threw: Right

MLB debut
- September 9, 1978, for the Montreal Expos

Last MLB appearance
- June 30, 1989, for the Detroit Tigers

MLB statistics
- Win–loss record: 64–59
- Earned run average: 3.78
- Strikeouts: 748
- Stats at Baseball Reference

Teams
- Montreal Expos (1978–1980, 1982, 1984–1985); Atlanta Braves (1986–1987); Philadelphia Phillies (1988); Detroit Tigers (1989)

David William Palmer, Jr. (born October 19, 1957) is an American former professional baseball pitcher. He played in Major League Baseball (MLB) in parts of ten seasons spanning 1978–1989, with the Montreal Expos, Atlanta Braves, Philadelphia Phillies, and Detroit Tigers.

== Early life ==
Palmer was a star pitcher for the Glens Falls High School Indians baseball team until he graduated in 1976. He pitched alongside fellow future Major League Baseball pitcher Dave LaPoint.

== Montreal ==
Palmer was drafted by the Montreal Expos in the 21st round (489th overall) of the 1976 amateur entry draft. He pitched in the Expos organization until 1985. Although he made his major league debut in 1978, he pitched only a handful of minor league games in 1981 due to injuries, and had to fight his way back from Triple-A in 1982, where he made nine minor league starts. Additionally, he did not throw a single pitch in 1983 due to further injuries.

On April 21, 1984, Palmer pitched an unusual moment in baseball history when he threw a five-inning perfect game in the second game of a doubleheader at Busch Stadium against the St. Louis Cardinals. Officials called the game on account of rain, and major-league baseball officials later struck the game from baseball's official list of perfect games since it only lasted five innings.

He was granted free agency on November 12, 1985.

== Atlanta ==
Palmer was signed by the Atlanta Braves on February 13, 1986, shortly before pitchers and catchers were to report to spring training. Having his best season statistically, Palmer was granted free agency on November 12, 1986. After testing the free agent waters for the second time in his career, Palmer decided to sign back with the Braves on December 19, 1986. However, his second season in Atlanta did not prove to duplicate his first, and he was granted free agency on November 9, 1987.

== Philadelphia ==
Palmer was signed as a free agent by the Philadelphia Phillies on December 18, 1987. Although Palmer pitched reasonably well for the Phillies, he was released on October 13, 1988. His tenure in Philadelphia was best remembered for a blooper in which he tripped over his foot and the third base bag and landed on his face.

== Detroit and beyond ==
Palmer was signed as a free agent by the Detroit Tigers on February 25, 1989, shortly before the exhibition season began in spring training. Although Palmer broke camp with the Tigers, he pitched poorly and was demoted after making five starts. After making 10 minor league starts, Palmer was released by the Detroit Tigers on July 13, 1989. On July 27, 1989 Palmer signed a minor league contract with the Cleveland Indians. Palmer finished the season in the minor leagues, and never pitched in the major leagues with the Indians. He was released on October 26, 1989.

== Personal life ==
Palmer lives in the Atlanta area and was the pitching coach for Parkview High School, Gwinnett County, Georgia for a number of years.

Palmer has a son, John Brandon "Chili" Palmer and two daughters, Liza Michelle Palmer and Leah Victoria Palmer. His son-in-law is David Allen.

== Sources ==
- Career statistics from Baseball Reference · Baseball Reference (Minors) · Retrosheet · Baseball Almanac
