= Keith Miller (outfielder) =

American baseball player (born 1962)

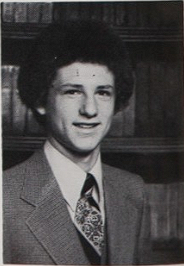
- Outfielder
- Born: March 7, 1962 (age 64); Dallas, Texas, U.S.
- Batted: Switch Threw: Right

MLB debut
- April 23, 1988, for the Philadelphia Phillies

Last MLB appearance
- October 1, 1989, for the Philadelphia Phillies

MLB statistics
- Batting average: .190
- Home runs: 0
- Runs batted in: 6
- Stats at Baseball Reference

Teams
- Philadelphia Phillies (1988–1989)

Neal Keith Miller (born March 7, 1962) is an American former professional baseball player, who played in Major League Baseball (MLB) for the Philadelphia Phillies. Used mostly as a pinch hitter, he appeared in 55 big league games, only ten of which included an appearance in the field — at five different positions — in 1988 and part of 1989.

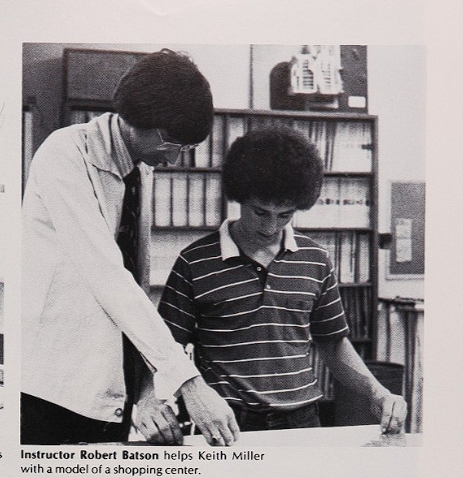
Keith Miller during his time at Skyline Magnet High School

Keith Miller on Skyline's baseball team
