= Gibson Alba =

Dominican baseball player (born 1960)

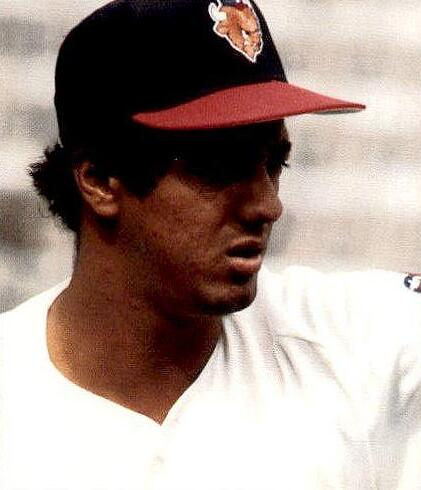
- Alba with the Buffalo Bisons c. 1987
- Pitcher
- Born: January 18, 1960 (age 66); Santiago de los Caballeros, Dominican Republic
- Batted: Left Threw: Left

MLB debut
- May 3, 1988, for the St. Louis Cardinals

Last MLB appearance
- May 8, 1988, for the St. Louis Cardinals

MLB statistics
- Win–loss record: 0–0
- Earned run average: 2.70
- Strikeouts: 3
- Stats at Baseball Reference

Teams
- St. Louis Cardinals (1988)

Gibson Alberto Rosado Alba (born January 18, 1960) is a Dominican former professional baseball pitcher who played for the St. Louis Cardinals in 1988. He appeared in three games as a reliever, pitching 3.1 innings in his career.

Alba was a sidearmer. Around the time Alba debuted with the Cardinals, he told St. Louis Post-Dispatch reporter Rick Hummel, via interpreter Nick Leyva, that he was named after Bob Gibson, who his father admired. However, Hummel noted that Gibson did not debut in the major leagues until 1959 and "hardly had established himself by" the time Alba was born.
