= Roger Samuels =

American baseball player (1961–2022)

- Pitcher
- Born: January 5, 1961; San Jose, California, U.S.
- Died: January 17, 2022 (aged 61); San Jose, California, U.S.
- Batted: Left Threw: Left

MLB debut
- July 20, 1988, for the San Francisco Giants

Last MLB appearance
- June 8, 1989, for the Pittsburgh Pirates

MLB statistics
- Win–loss record: 1–2
- Earned run average: 4.33
- Strikeouts: 24
- Stats at Baseball Reference

Teams
- San Francisco Giants (1988); Pittsburgh Pirates (1988–1989)

Roger Howard Samuels (January 5, 1961 – January 17, 2022) was an American professional baseball player who pitched in Major League Baseball from 1988 to 1989 for the San Francisco Giants and Pittsburgh Pirates. He died from cancer on January 17, 2022, at the age of 61.
