= Ron Jones (baseball) =

American baseball player (1964-2006)

- Right fielder
- Born: June 11, 1964; Seguin, Texas, U.S.
- Died: June 4, 2006 (aged 41); Houston, Texas, U.S.
- Batted: Left Threw: Right

MLB debut
- August 26, 1988, for the Philadelphia Phillies

Last MLB appearance
- October 6, 1991, for the Philadelphia Phillies

MLB statistics
- Batting average: .272
- Home runs: 13
- Runs batted in: 40

CPBL statistics
- Batting average: .285
- Home runs: 18
- Runs batted in: 75
- Stats at Baseball Reference

Teams
- Philadelphia Phillies (1988–1991); Jungo Bears / Sinon Bulls (1995–1996)

Ronald Glen Jones (June 11, 1964 – June 4, 2006) was an American professional baseball player for the Philadelphia Phillies during the late 1980s and early 1990s. He displayed great promise as a hitter, but his career was spoiled by two severe knee injuries.

== Life and career ==
Born in Seguin, Texas, Jones was drafted in 1982 and 1983 but chose not to turn professional. Eventually, in 1984, he signed with the Phillies as a free agent. The stocky outfielder battled some problems with weight and injuries, but he displayed great hitting talent in the farm system. His ability at the plate and capable defense eventually earned him a spot with the big league club. However, after a promising first couple of months in August and September 1988, in April 1989 Jones suffered the first of two torn patellar tendons. The other, to his opposite knee, came in June 1990. Jones also came back from that injury; however, his time in the majors was all but finished. Nonetheless, he continued in the minors, Mexico, Taiwan, independent baseball leagues, and semi-pro ball through 2000.

Upon retirement, Jones began working as a hitting instructor and coach for youths, eventually forming the Big League Batting Academy in Houston, Texas, alongside another former major leaguer, Charlie Hayes. In June 2006, after Jones did not show up at the academy for a few days, he was found dead in his home. He is thought to have died of either an aneurysm, heart attack, or stroke.
