= Germán Jiménez =

Mexican baseball player (born 1962)

- Pitcher
- Born: December 5, 1962 (age 63); Santiago Ixcuintla, Nayarit, Mexico
- Batted: Left Threw: Left

MLB debut
- June 28, 1988, for the Atlanta Braves

Last MLB appearance
- October 1, 1988, for the Atlanta Braves

MLB statistics
- Win–loss record: 1–6
- Earned run average: 5.01
- Strikeouts: 26
- Stats at Baseball Reference

Teams
- Atlanta Braves (1988)

Germán Jiménez Camarena [he-may'-nes] (born December 5, 1962) is a Mexican former starting pitcher in Major League Baseball who played for the Atlanta Braves during the 1988 season. Listed at 5' 11", 200 lb., he batted and threw left-handed.

Jiménez was born in Santiago Ixcuintla, Nayarit. As a teenager, he pitched for local Nayarit teams. In 1980, he was a member of the Mexico national baseball team in the Amateur World Series, and later played for the Charros de Jalisco in the Mexican League. In 1988, he was purchased by the Braves from Jalisco and made his debut for the big team in the midseason.

In one season career, Jiménez posted a 1–6 record with a 5.01 ERA in 15 appearances, including nine starts, giving up 31 earned runs on 65 hits and 12 walks while striking out 26 in 55 2/3 innings of work. His only win came at expense of the New York Mets, 4–2, at Shea Stadium. After that, he was demoted to Double-A Greenville Braves in 1989 and had an 11–7 mark with a 3.48 ERA in 22 starts.

== See also ==
- 1988 Atlanta Braves season
- List of players from Mexico in Major League Baseball
