= Danny Clay =

American baseball player (born 1961)

- Pitcher
- Born: October 24, 1961 (age 64); Sun Valley, California, U.S.
- Batted: Right Threw: Right

MLB debut
- May 1, 1988, for the Philadelphia Phillies

Last MLB appearance
- August 23, 1988, for the Philadelphia Phillies

MLB statistics
- Win–loss record: 0–1
- Earned run average: 6.00
- Strikeouts: 12
- Stats at Baseball Reference

Teams
- Philadelphia Phillies (1988)

Danny Bruce Clay (born October 24, 1961) is an American former professional baseball pitcher, who played in Major League Baseball (MLB) for the Philadelphia Phillies, in 1988. He batted and threw right-handed.

Clay was signed by the Minnesota Twins as an amateur free agent in 1982. The Twins traded him to Philadelphia on June 24, 1987, with minor league infielder Tom Schwarz for Dan Schatzeder and cash considerations. Clay's brief big league career numbers include a record of 0–1, 12 strikeouts, a 6.00 earned run average (ERA), in 17 games played, all with the Phillies.
