= Jeff Robinson (relief pitcher) =

American baseball player (born 1960)

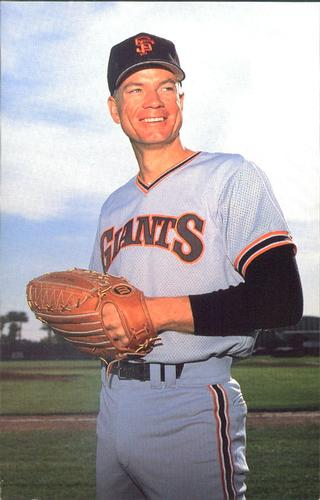
- Pitcher
- Born: December 13, 1960 (age 65); Santa Ana, California, U.S.
- Batted: Right Threw: Right

MLB debut
- April 7, 1984, for the San Francisco Giants

Last MLB appearance
- October 3, 1992, for the Chicago Cubs

MLB statistics
- Win–loss record: 46–57
- Earned run average: 3.79
- Strikeouts: 629
- Stats at Baseball Reference

Teams
- San Francisco Giants (1984–1987); Pittsburgh Pirates (1987–1989); New York Yankees (1990); California Angels (1991); Chicago Cubs (1992)

Jeffrey Daniel Robinson (born December 13, 1960) is an American former right-handed pitcher in Major League Baseball who played nine seasons for the San Francisco Giants, Pittsburgh Pirates, New York Yankees, California Angels and Chicago Cubs.

== Professional career ==
Robinson, a 6 ft 4 in (1.93 m), 200 lb (91 kg) relief pitcher, was selected by the Detroit Tigers in the fourteenth round of the 1982 amateur draft. He did not sign with the team and was sent back into the draft pool. A year later, in the 1983 amateur draft, he was selected by the San Francisco Giants in the second round. He was originally a starting pitcher, making his major league debut on April 7, 1984, against the St. Louis Cardinals at Candlestick Park. He pitched six scoreless innings, allowing four hits, and struck out four batters and walked three in an 11–0 victory. He started 33 games for the Giants during the 1984 season, going 7–15 with an earned run average of 4.56 in 34 appearances.

Robinson only played in eight games the following season. His ERA shot up to 5.11 in 12 1/3 innings. In 1986, he played full-time as a reliever, starting only one game for the Giants. He went 6–3 with an ERA of 3.36 and 90 strikeouts. But he also led the team in wild pitches with eleven. He saw the same amount of time in 1987 with the Giants, but on August 21 he was traded with Scott Medvin to the Pittsburgh Pirates for Rick Reuschel.

Robinson finished the season with a 2–1 record and a 3.04 ERA in eighteen relief appearances for the Pirates. In the seventh inning of the September 7 game against the Chicago Cubs at Wrigley Field, he struck out all three batters on nine total pitches to become the 13th National League pitcher to throw an immaculate inning, the 21st such occurrence in major league history. Two days later, Robinson won a game with his bat when he hit an unlikely home run, his first in the majors, off of closer Lee Smith to break a tie with two outs in the ninth inning.

Over the course of the whole 1987 season, he went 8–9 with an ERA of 2.85 – the lowest average of his career – in 81 relief appearances. He had one of his best seasons in 1988 as he went 11–5 with an ERA of 3.03, appearing in a team-high 75 games. In 1989, he started nineteen games and went 7–13 in 50 total appearances with an ERA of 4.58, which wasn't good enough to keep him in Pittsburgh. Following the season, he was traded with Willie Smith to the New York Yankees for catcher Don Slaught.

He started seeing less time in New York, pitching in about half the innings he did in his final season in Pittsburgh. He went 3–6 in 54 appearances with a 3.45 ERA. After the season, he was on the move once more. He was granted free agency by the Yankees and signed with the California Angels. With the Angels, he had perhaps his worst season; he failed to win a game and had his highest career ERA, at 5.37. The Angels released him following the season, and he signed a one-year contract with the Cubs.

In his final season in 1992, he went 4–3 with a 3.00 ERA. After his contract expired, he was granted free agency by the Cubs. A couple months later, he signed with the Cubs once more, but he never played another major league game, and his career eventually came to a close.
