= 1988 Major League Baseball All-Star Game =

1988 American baseball competition

	1	2	3	4	5	6	7	8	9	R	H	E
American League	0	0	1	1	0	0	0	0	0	2	6	2
National League	0	0	0	1	0	0	0	0	0	1	5	0
- Date: July 12, 1988
- Venue: Riverfront Stadium
- City: Cincinnati, Ohio
- Managers: Tom Kelly (MIN); Whitey Herzog (STL)
- MVP: Terry Steinbach (OAK)
- Attendance: 55,837
- Ceremonial first pitch: Vice President George H. W. Bush
- Television: ABC
- TV announcers: Al Michaels, Jim Palmer and Tim McCarver
- Radio: CBS
- Radio announcers: Brent Musburger, Jerry Coleman and Johnny Bench

The 1988 Major League Baseball All-Star Game was the 59th playing of the "Midsummer Classic" between Major League Baseball's American League (AL) and National League (NL) All-Star teams. The All-Star Game was held on July 12, 1988, at Riverfront Stadium in Cincinnati, Ohio, the home of the NL's Cincinnati Reds.

The game resulted in the AL defeating the NL 2-1. Terry Steinbach, a catcher for the AL's Oakland Athletics, won the All-Star game's most valuable player award. Steinbach was credited with both of the AL's two runs in the game. Frank Viola of the Minnesota Twins was the winning pitcher.

This was Cincinnati's fourth time hosting, tying the Reds with the Cleveland Guardians for the most All-Star Games hosted by a franchise. It was also the second and final time the game was held at Riverfront Stadium. The Midsummer Classic would return to the city in 2015, when the Reds had moved into Great American Ballpark.

== All-Star rosters ==
Players in italics have since been inducted into the National Baseball Hall of Fame.

=== American League ===
Starters
Position	Player	Team	All-Star Games
P	Frank Viola	Twins	1
C	Terry Steinbach	Athletics	1
1B	Mark McGwire	Athletics	2
2B	Paul Molitor	Brewers	3
3B	Wade Boggs	Red Sox	4
SS	Cal Ripken Jr.	Orioles	6
OF	José Canseco	Athletics	2
OF	Dave Winfield	Yankees	12
OF	Rickey Henderson	Yankees	8

Pitchers
Position	Player	Team	All-Star Games
P	Doyle Alexander	Tigers	1
P	Roger Clemens	Red Sox	2
P	Dennis Eckersley	Athletics	3
P	Mark Gubicza	Royals	1
P	Doug Jones	Indians	1
P	Dan Plesac	Brewers	2
P	Jeff Reardon	Twins	3
P	Jeff Russell	Rangers	1
P	Dave Stieb	Blue Jays	6

Reserves
Position	Player	Team	All-Star Games
C	Tim Laudner	Twins	1
1B	George Brett	Royals	13
1B	Don Mattingly	Yankees	5
2B	Johnny Ray	Angels	1
2B	Harold Reynolds	Mariners	2
3B	Gary Gaetti	Twins	1
3B	Carney Lansford	Athletics	1
SS	Ozzie Guillén	White Sox	1
SS	Kurt Stillwell	Royals	1
SS	Alan Trammell	Tigers	6
OF	Mike Greenwell	Red Sox	1
OF	Kirby Puckett	Twins	3

=== National League ===
Starters
Position	Player	Team	All-Star Games
P	Dwight Gooden	Mets	4
C	Gary Carter	Mets	11
1B	Will Clark	Giants	1
2B	Ryne Sandberg	Cubs	5
3B	Bobby Bonilla	Pirates	1
SS	Ozzie Smith	Cardinals	8
OF	Darryl Strawberry	Mets	5
OF	Vince Coleman	Cardinals	1
OF	Andre Dawson	Cubs	5

Pitchers
Position	Player	Team	All-Star Games
P	David Cone	Mets	1
P	Mark Davis	Padres	1
P	Kevin Gross	Phillies	1
P	Orel Hershiser	Dodgers	2
P	Danny Jackson	Reds	1
P	Bob Knepper	Astros	2
P	Greg Maddux	Cubs	1
P	Bob Walk	Pirates	1
P	Todd Worrell	Cardinals	1

Reserves
Position	Player	Team	All-Star Games
C	Lance Parrish	Phillies	7
1B	Andrés Galarraga	Expos	1
1B	Gerald Perry	Braves	1
2B	Robby Thompson	Giants	1
3B	Vance Law	Cubs	1
3B	Chris Sabo	Reds	1
SS	Shawon Dunston	Cubs	1
SS	Barry Larkin	Reds	1
OF	Willie McGee	Cardinals	4
OF	Rafael Palmeiro	Cubs	1
OF	Andy Van Slyke	Pirates	1

== All-Star Game ==
=== Coaching staff ===
Description	AL	NL
Managers	Tom Kelly	Whitey Herzog
Coaches	Tom Trebelhorn	Roger Craig
Coaches	Bobby Valentine	Buck Rodgers
Honorary Captains	Bobby Doerr	Willie Stargell

=== Umpires ===
Home Plate	Frank Pulli (NL)
First Base	Larry Barnett (AL)
Second Base	Terry Tata (NL)
Third Base	Dale Ford (AL)
Left field	Randy Marsh (NL)
Right field	Dan Morrison (AL)

=== Starting lineups ===
American League				National League			
Order	Player	Team	Position	Order	Player	Team	Position
1	Rickey Henderson	Yankees	CF	1	Vince Coleman	Cardinals	LF
2	Paul Molitor	Brewers	2B	2	Ryne Sandberg	Cubs	2B
3	Wade Boggs	Red Sox	3B	3	Andre Dawson	Cubs	CF
4	José Canseco	Athletics	LF	4	Darryl Strawberry	Mets	RF
5	Dave Winfield	Yankees	RF	5	Bobby Bonilla	Pirates	3B
6	Cal Ripken Jr.	Orioles	SS	6	Will Clark	Giants	1B
7	Mark McGwire	Athletics	1B	7	Gary Carter	Mets	C
8	Terry Steinbach	Athletics	C	8	Ozzie Smith	Cardinals	SS
9	Frank Viola	Twins	P	9	Dwight Gooden	Mets	P

=== Game summary ===
Tuesday, July 12, 1988 8:35 pm (ET) at Riverfront Stadium in Cincinnati, Ohio
Team	1	2	3	4	5	6	7	8	9	R	H	E
American League	0	0	1	1	0	0	0	0	0	2	6	2
National League	0	0	0	1	0	0	0	0	0	1	5	0
WP: Frank Viola (1-0) LP: Dwight Gooden (0-1) Sv: Dennis Eckersley (1); Home runs: AL: Terry Steinbach (1); NL: None
