= Simulation Pro Yakyū =

1995 video game

- Cover art
- Developer: Hect
- Publisher: Hect
- Series: Simulation Pro Yakyū
- Platform: Super Famicom
- Release: JP: April 28, 1995
- Genre: Traditional baseball simulation
- Modes: Single-player, multiplayer

Simulation Pro Yakyū (シミュレーションプロ野球; "Baseball Simulation") is a Japan-exclusive video game for the Super Famicom that uses the actual ball players and teams of the 1995 Nippon Professional Baseball league and combines them into a full-blown simulator.

== Gameplay ==
This is a game in progress with the pitcher preparing to face off against the batter.

Pitchers throw the ball to the batter using a television-like angle. The strike-ball-out counter is used like in a real Japanese baseball match. While the game takes place in fictitious Hect Stadium, the action is very close to watching an actual professional baseball match. There is a lot of information for batters and pitchers to digest like pitching tendencies, earned run averages, batting averages, and even the current wind levels. Everything is in Japanese including the menu options and the player's surnames.

Players can choose to pitch either inside or outside the strike zone by moving the ball across a series of two boxes. The red box is the batter's immediate zone of batting while the yellow box is the entire width of home plate. Each button on the Super Famicom controller represents a base to throw in case one of the runners decide to steal a base. Unlike North America where the keys were assigned letters, the four major buttons on the Japanese game controller were assigned colors (as it was easier for Japanese users to memorize colors instead of the Latin letters A, B, X, and Y).

This game is a prequel to Furuta Atsuya no Simulation Pro Yakyū 2; which would enhance on various features in this game.

== Reception ==
On release, Famicom Tsūshin scored the game a 21 out of 40.
