= Orel Hershiser's scoreless innings streak =

Major League Baseball pitching record

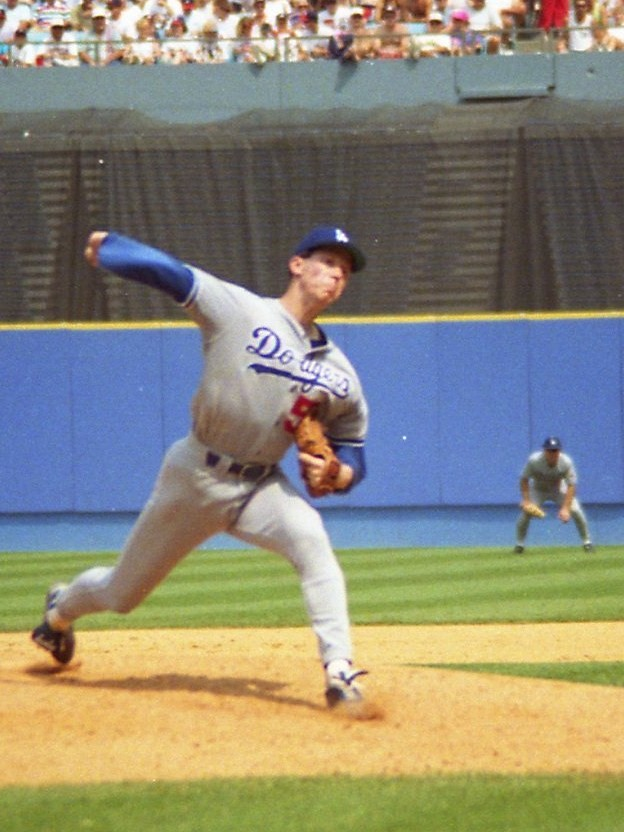
Hershiser pitching for the Dodgers in 1993

During the 1988 Major League Baseball season, pitcher Orel Hershiser of the Los Angeles Dodgers set the MLB record for consecutive scoreless innings pitched. Over 59 consecutive innings, opposing hitters did not score a run against Hershiser. During the streak, he averted numerous high-risk scoring situations. The streak spanned from the sixth inning of an August 30 game against the Montreal Expos to the 10th inning of a September 28 game against the San Diego Padres. The previous record of 58 2/3 innings was set by former Dodger pitcher Don Drysdale in 1968; as the team's radio announcer, Drysdale called Hershiser's streak as he pursued the new record. Pundits have described the streak as among the greatest records in baseball history, with one pundit ranking it among the greatest individual feats in American sports.

During the streak, the Elias Sports Bureau changed its criteria for the official consecutive scoreless innings record for starting pitchers from including fractional innings in which one or two outs had been recorded to counting only complete scoreless innings. Since the streak was active at the end of the 1988 season, it could have spanned two separate seasons. However, Hershiser yielded a run in his first inning of work in the 1989 season against the Cincinnati Reds, thus ending the streak at 59 consecutive scoreless innings pitched. The streak includes only innings pitched in the regular season, excluding eight scoreless innings Hershiser pitched to start Game 1 of the 1988 National League Championship Series on October 4 (unofficially extending his streak to 67 combined innings). Although he completed the ninth inning in each start, the streak's final game lasted 16 innings, of which he pitched only the first 10. Thus, Hershiser did not match Drysdale's record of six consecutive complete game shutouts.

The streak was initially overshadowed by Hershiser achieving 20 wins and the race for the NL Cy Young Award between Hershiser and Danny Jackson until Hershiser reached 40 consecutive innings. Another distraction during the streak was his wife's pregnancy and his son's childbirth complications. The record-setting game was overshadowed by the 1988 Summer Olympics, football, and baseball pennant races; it was not broadcast on local television in Los Angeles. Following the regular season, Hershiser was awarded the NL Cy Young Award. In the playoffs, he earned both the NL Championship Series Most Valuable Player Award and the World Series MVP Award. He also secured Sportsman of the Year and Associated Press Athlete of the Year honors. Hershiser appeared in the 1989 MLB All-Star Game and continued to be an effective pitcher for many seasons, including two additional appearances in the World Series, one of which was preceded by his winning the 1995 AL Championship Series MVP Award.

== Background ==
Hershiser was selected by Dodgers in the 17th round of the 1979 MLB draft with the 440th overall selection. He made his professional debut with the Class A Dodger farm team in the Midwest League, the Clinton Dodgers in 1979. He made his major league debut for the Dodgers on September 1, 1983, against the Montreal Expos. Hershisher made his first start on May 26, 1984, against the New York Mets and became a full-time starter in the Dodgers' rotation on July 14.

Hershiser had pitched a 33 2/3-inning scoreless streak in 1984, eventually joining Gaylord Perry and Luis Tiant as the only pitchers between 1963 and 2014 with at least two streaks of this length. Hershiser's 1984 streak, which was the longest scoreless inning streak of the year, was broken up on July 24 by a home run by two-time NL Most Valuable Player Dale Murphy of the Atlanta Braves. His streak included a blown save on July 8 against the St. Louis Cardinals and a nine-inning shutout against the Cardinals on July 19.

Despite an emergency appendectomy that delayed his spring training and shortened his time to get in shape for the season, Hershiser had been named NL Baseball Pitcher of the Month in April and a participant in the 1988 All-Star Game, getting outs against all three batters. In the eight games he started between July 10 and August 14, Hershiser had a 3–4 win–loss record with a 4.76 earned run average (ERA), raising his season ERA from 2.46 to 3.06. Following his August 14 start in which he left the game after two innings (his shortest appearance since 1985) with the Dodgers behind the Giants 8–2, he pitched complete games on August 19 (a shutout) and August 24. Prior to the game, Hershiser trailed teammate Tim Leary in shutouts, six to three, and Leary also combined with other pitchers to record a shutout that was not counted in his individual total.

Previously, Walter Johnson of the 1913 Washington Senators had held the consecutive scoreless innings record, at 55 2/3, with two relief appearances, which gave him a fractional total. In 1968, Drysdale, also of the Dodgers, surpassed Johnson by pitching 58 2/3 innings in six consecutive nine-inning shutouts between May 14 and June 4, 1968. Drysdale's streak ended with four scoreless innings in a 5-3 victory over the Philadelphia Phillies on June 8.

== The streak ==
The streak spanned Hershiser's 29th through 35th (and final) starts of the 1988 season for the Dodgers, which were the 190th through 196th games of his career. It began on August 30 against the Expos, after seven-time All-Star Tim Raines scored with two outs in the fifth inning. The streak ended on April 5, 1989, against Cincinnati, when Barry Larkin scored with two outs in the first inning. During the streak, although 41 of the 59 scoreless innings came on the road away from traditionally pitcher-friendly Dodger Stadium, Hershiser lowered his ERA from 2.90 to 2.26. The Dodgers scored only 13 runs in support of Hershiser's 59 innings. Overall, opposing hitters batted 0-for-9 with runners on third and 0-for-31 with runners in scoring position. During the streak, according to the Chicago Tribune, Hershiser caused opposing teams to leave 30 runners on base; Drysdale, in his streak, left 35. However, USA Today reported that Hershiser left 36 runners on base. At that point in his career, Hershiser was regarded as a "right-handed sinkerball artist" although he did not throw a sinker. He relied on a fastball, slider, curveball, and split-finger fastball, the latter of which he used as a sinker.

Once Hershiser achieved his second consecutive complete-game shutout to reach 22 consecutive scoreless innings, he was lauded for his 20th win in the national press while the local press praised his serious contention for the Cy Young Award, given to the league's best pitcher. The 20th win had been his preseason goal. His third consecutive complete-game shutout, which brought him to 31 consecutive innings, was said in local newspapers to have strengthened his Cy Young Award chances and in national newspapers to have helped his team in the pennant race. There was little emphasis on the historical context of his streak at this point, even among newspapers that headlined the streak. Upon reaching 40 consecutive innings, most of the national media began to mention that the record was 58 (in some cases 58 2/3). In some papers, Hershiser's approach to the record was being described as a chase. Hershiser, however, said that he was primarily focused on his hospitalized newborn son.

After Hershiser reached 49 consecutive innings because of what some sources describe as an umpire's favorable interference ruling on a double play, the sports media compared him to Drysdale, who had a similar incident occur during his streak. The Houston Chronicle noted that both beneficial calls were in Dodgers–Giants games. However, the press also noted that Hershiser needed another complete game shutout to tie Drysdale and pass Johnson on the all-time consecutive scoreless innings list. In addition to covering the record pursuit, some sportswriters perceived that Hershiser had taken a commanding lead in the Cy Young Award race. Despite the official ruling by MLB statistician Seymour Siwoff that only full innings of starting pitchers count toward the record, some sportswriters continued to refer to the record as 58 2/3 innings. The pennant race also continued to draw attention as the Dodgers closed in on the NL West division title. An Associated Press article noted that it was Hershiser's eighth consecutive complete game and 15th of the season and Hershiser's fifth consecutive complete game shutout. As Hershiser's last remaining start approached, the media mentioned that he needed one more complete game shutout to tie the all-time record. When the total reached 49, Hershiser first began to believe that the record was within reach. Not only were his teammates too superstitious to talk to him about the streak, but Dodgers announcer Drysdale also avoided the subject when talking to Hershiser for fear of jinxing him. Hershiser was not superstitious about the record, saying, "I'm pretty loosey-goosey about it.... I talk about it all the time. I'm not superstitious."

| Date | Opponent | Stadium | Decision (Win–loss record) | Innings pitched | Hits | Runs | Earned runs | Bases on balls | Strikeouts | Home runs allowed | Season earned run average | Batters faced | Pitch count | Strikes thrown |
|---|---|---|---|---|---|---|---|---|---|---|---|---|---|---|
| August 30, 1988 | Montreal Expos | Olympic Stadium | W (18–8) | 9 | 6 | 2 | 2 | 2 | 9 | 0 | 2.84 | 36 | 118 | 79 |
| September 5, 1988 | Atlanta Braves | Atlanta–Fulton County Stadium | W (19–8) | 9 | 4 | 0 | 0 | 1 | 8 | 0 | 2.73 | 31 | 109 | 69 |
| September 10, 1988 | Cincinnati Reds | Dodger Stadium | W (20–8) | 9 | 7 | 0 | 0 | 3 | 8 | 0 | 2.62 | 35 | 109 | 67 |
| September 14, 1988 | Atlanta Braves | Dodger Stadium | W (21–8) | 9 | 6 | 0 | 0 | 2 | 8 | 0 | 2.52 | 35 | 103 | 70 |
| September 19, 1988 | Houston Astros | Astrodome | W (22–8) | 9 | 4 | 0 | 0 | 0 | 5 | 0 | 2.43 | 32 | 96 | 67 |
| September 23, 1988 | San Francisco Giants | Candlestick Park | W (23–8) | 9 | 5 | 0 | 0 | 2 | 2 | 0 | 2.35 | 32 | 112 | 73 |
| September 28, 1988 | San Diego Padres | Jack Murphy Stadium | | 10 | 4 | 0 | 0 | 1 | 3 | 0 | 2.26 | 36 | 116 | 77 |
| April 5, 1989 | Cincinnati Reds | Riverfront Stadium | L (0–1) | 7 | 7 | 4 | 2 | 1 | 6 | 0 | 2.57 | 31 | 101 | 64 |
Postseason performance not part of official record
| October 4, 1988* | New York Mets | Dodger Stadium | | 8.1 | 7 | 2 | 2 | 1 | 6 | 0 | 2.16 | 31 | 100 | 67 |

=== August 30, 1988 ===
August 30, 1988 7:35 at Stade Olympique, Montreal, Quebec, Canada
| Team | 1 | 2 | 3 | 4 | 5 | 6 | 7 | 8 | 9 | R | H | E |
|---|---|---|---|---|---|---|---|---|---|---|---|---|
| Los Angeles | 0 | 3 | 0 | 0 | 1 | 0 | 0 | 0 | 0 | 4 | 5 | 3 |
| Montreal | 0 | 0 | 0 | 0 | 2 | 0 | 0 | 0 | 0 | 2 | 6 | 1 |
WP: Orel Hershiser (18–8) LP: Brian Holman (2–6); Attendance: 21,454 (Time: 2:23)

The Dodgers entered the game with a 76–54 record and a 6.5-game lead in the NL West over the Houston Astros, while the Montreal Expos were 11 games back in third place in the NL East with a 66–64 record entering the game. With the August 30 win, the Dodgers retained their 6.5-game lead. The win marked the Dodgers' fifth consecutive win and 12th out of 15. Hershiser contributed a two-run double in the second inning to help the Dodgers build a 3–0 lead. After Hershiser gave up two runs in the fifth, no baserunners reached second base against him in the final four innings, thus marking the first four scoreless innings of his streak. The game marked Hershiser's third consecutive and 10th complete game of the season. Following the game, his 2.84 ERA ranked third on the team behind Tim Leary (2.44) and John Tudor (2.37).

Excerpted Play-by-Play

Legend
| Score | Runs already scored by the batting and defensive team separated by a "–" |
| # of outs | The number of outs prior to the play |
| Runners on base | Baserunners' base positions |
| Pitch # of play (count) | The number of pitches in the at bat and (count) |
| Result of play | The result of the play in terms of outs and runs |
| Batter | Name of the batter |
| Play description | Play result in baseball scorekeeping language and notation |

| Score | # of outs | Runners on base | Pitch # of play (count) | Result of play | Batter | Play description |
August 30, 1988, Bottom of the 5th, Expos Batting, Behind 0–4, Dodgers' Orel Hershiser facing the 7th, 8th, and 9th positions in the batting order
| 0–4 | 0 | none on | 1,(0–0) | out | M. Fitzgerald | Foul Flyball: LF (LF Foul) |
| 0–4 | 1 | none on | 5,(2–2) | | R. Hudler | Single to 3B (Ground Ball); Hudler to 2B/Adv on E5 (throw to 1B) |
| 0–4 | 1 | 2nd | 2,(1–0) | out | B. Holman | Ground out: SS-1B (SS-2B); Hudler to 3B |
| 0–4 | 2 | 3rd | 4,(2–1) | run | T. Raines | Double to LF (Line Drive to Deep LF Line); Hudler Scores |
| 1–4 | 2 | 2nd | 3,(2–0) | run | D. Martinez | Single to CF (Fly Ball); Raines Scores; Martinez to 2B/Adv on E1 (throw) |
| 2–4 | 2 | 2nd | 1,(0–0) | out | T. Jones | Ground out: 2B-1B |
2 runs, 3 hits, 2 errors, 1 LOB. Dodgers 4, Expos 2.

=== September 5, 1988 ===
September 5, 1988 7:40 at Atlanta–Fulton County Stadium, Atlanta
| Team | 1 | 2 | 3 | 4 | 5 | 6 | 7 | 8 | 9 | R | H | E |
|---|---|---|---|---|---|---|---|---|---|---|---|---|
| Los Angeles | 2 | 0 | 1 | 0 | 0 | 0 | 0 | 0 | 0 | 3 | 8 | 1 |
| Atlanta | 0 | 0 | 0 | 0 | 0 | 0 | 0 | 0 | 0 | 0 | 4 | 2 |
WP: Orel Hershiser (19–8) LP: Rick Mahler (9–13); Attendance: 10,768 (Time: 2:24)

Hershiser had been scheduled to pitch against the NL-leading New York Mets (80–54) on Sunday, September 4, but a rainout delayed his performance. The Dodgers entered the game with a 77–57 record and a five-game lead in the NL West over the Astros, while the Atlanta Braves were 31 games back in sixth place in the division with a 46–88 record entering the game. With the September 5 win, the Dodgers retained their 5-game lead. Hershiser struck out Dale Murphy four times, once resorting to a rare sidearm curveball to do so, to the dismay of pitching coach Ron Perranoski, who worried about injuries caused by sidearm pitching. According to ESPN's Mark Simon, this was the only game of Murphy's 2,180-game career in which a single pitcher struck him out four times. After a two-out walk to Dion James in the third inning, Hershiser allowed no baserunners until the ninth inning. With his fourth straight complete game, Hershiser raised his record to 19–8, making him 3–1 with a 1.00 ERA in those games.

=== September 10, 1988 ===
September 10, 1988 7:05 at Dodger Stadium, Los Angeles, California
| Team | 1 | 2 | 3 | 4 | 5 | 6 | 7 | 8 | 9 | R | H | E |
|---|---|---|---|---|---|---|---|---|---|---|---|---|
| Cincinnati | 0 | 0 | 0 | 0 | 0 | 0 | 0 | 0 | 0 | 0 | 7 | 2 |
| Los Angeles | 0 | 0 | 0 | 2 | 1 | 0 | 0 | 2 | x | 5 | 6 | 0 |
WP: Orel Hershiser (20–8) LP: Norm Charlton (1–4); Home runs: CIN: None; LAD: Rick Dempsey (7, off Rob Murphy; 8th inn, 1 on, 2 outs to LF); Attendance: 42,393 (Time: 2:31)

The Dodgers entered the game with a 79–60 record and a four-game lead in the NL West over the Houston Astros, while the Cincinnati Reds were 5.5 games back in third place in the division with a 74–66 record entering the game. With the September 10 win, the Dodgers held a five-game lead. Although left-handed pitcher Fernando Valenzuela had won 20 games in 1986, Hershiser became the first Dodger righthander to win 20 games since Don Sutton in 1976. Hershiser said, about reaching this accomplishment, "It's a goal that the world sets as a standard, and when you reach it, it's a great feeling." In the Cy Young Award race, Danny Jackson of the Reds had beaten the Dodgers the night before to move to 21-6 with a 2.43 ERA (against Hershiser's 20-8 with a 2.62 ERA). In the third inning, Hershiser struck out Eric Davis with the bases loaded and two outs and later got Davis to hit into two double plays. In the seventh inning, Ken Griffey, Sr. and Larkin were retired after the Reds put runners on first and third base with one out. The game marked Hershiser's fifth consecutive complete game (and 12th of the season).

Excerpted Play-by-Play

Legend
| Score | Runs already scored by the batting and defensive team separated by a "–" |
| # of outs | The number of outs prior to the play |
| Runners on base | Baserunners' base positions |
| Pitch # of play (count) | The number of pitches in the at bat and (count) |
| Result of play | The result of the play in terms of outs and runs |
| Batter | Name of the batter |
| Play description | Play result in baseball scorekeeping language and notation |

September 10, 1988 Excerpted Play-by-Play
| Score | # of outs | Runners on base | Pitch # of play (count) | Result of play | Batter | Play description |
September 10, 1988, Top of the 3rd, Reds Batting, Tied 0-0, Dodgers' Orel Hershiser facing the 8th, 9th, and 1st positions in the batting order
| 0-0 | 0 | none on | 4,(1-2) | out | R. Oester | Strikeout Swinging |
| 0-0 | 1 | none on | 1,(0-0) | out | N. Charlton | Ground out: SS-1B |
| 0-0 | 2 | none on | 2,(0-1) | | B. Larkin | Single to RF (Ground Ball) |
| 0-0 | 2 | 1st | 1,(0-0) | | C. Sabo | Single to LF (Ground Ball); Larkin to 2B |
| 0-0 | 2 | 1st & 2nd | 5,(3-1) | | K. Daniels | Walk; Larkin to 3B; Sabo to 2B |
| 0-0 | 2 | 1st, 2nd & 3rd | 4,(1-2) | out | E. Davis | Strikeout Swinging |
0 runs, 2 hits, 0 errors, 3 LOB. Reds 0, Dodgers 0.
September 10, 1988, Top of the 7th, Reds Batting, Behind 0-3, Dodgers' Orel Hershiser facing 6-7-8
| 0-3 | 0 | none on | 2,(1-0) | out | H. Winningham | Ground out: 3B-1B |
| 0-3 | 1 | none on | 5,(3-1) | | J. Reed | Walk |
| 0-3 | 1 | 1st | 6,(2-2) | | R. Oester | Single to RF (Ground Ball); Reed to 3B |
Ken Griffey pinch hits for Frank Williams (P) batting 9th
| 0-3 | 1 | 1st & 3rd | 1,(0-0) | out | K. Griffey | Flyball: LF |
| 0-3 | 2 | 1st & 3rd | 4,(1-2) | out | B. Larkin | Strikeout Swinging (C-1B) |
0 runs, 1 hit, 0 errors, 2 LOB. Reds 0, Dodgers 3.

=== September 14, 1988 ===
September 14, 1988 7:37 at Dodger Stadium, Los Angeles, California
| Team | 1 | 2 | 3 | 4 | 5 | 6 | 7 | 8 | 9 | R | H | E |
|---|---|---|---|---|---|---|---|---|---|---|---|---|
| Atlanta | 0 | 0 | 0 | 0 | 0 | 0 | 0 | 0 | 0 | 0 | 6 | 1 |
| Los Angeles | 0 | 0 | 0 | 0 | 0 | 0 | 0 | 0 | 1 | 1 | 5 | 1 |
WP: Orel Hershiser (21–8) LP: Rick Mahler (9–15); Attendance: 42,434 (Time: 2:15)

The Dodgers entered the game with an 83–60 record and a 6.5-game lead in the NL West over the Astros, while the Atlanta Braves were 34 games back in sixth place in the division with a 49–94 record entering the game. With Hershiser's September 14 win, the Dodgers maintained a 6.5-game lead. Hershiser's record on the season against the Braves was 5–0 with a 1.29 ERA. The game marked only the third time in 1988 that he pitched on three days' rest. Lasorda and Perranoski moved Hershiser's start up one day because they wanted him to pitch the next week against the second-place Houston Astros. With the streak at 31 innings Hershiser tied Jackson in number of wins, and moved into a tie for the sixth longest scoreless streak for the franchise since the 1958 relocation to Los Angeles. Although Drysdale's record was mentioned after he reached 31 consecutive innings, the focus of the media was on the Cy Young Award race with Jackson. The win was Hershiser's seventh consecutive against the Braves, a streak that began on September 13, 1987.

The Braves opened the third inning with back-to-back singles by Ozzie Virgil and Terry Blocker. Hershiser responded by striking out opposing pitcher Rick Mahler and Ron Gant and then retiring Jeff Blauser on a flyball to left. In the seventh inning, a double by Andrés Thomas was followed with an error by Franklin Stubbs, giving the Braves runners at first and third. Hershiser loaded the bases with an intentional walk before retiring Mahler and Gant again. Gant's flyball sent Gibson to the outfield wall. Hershiser described it as his worst outing of his six consecutive complete games, saying: "It was the worst I've thrown in the last five or six starts.... I was really inconsistent. I didn't have good stuff or location. I couldn't establish a pattern. I had to work hard adjusting and got away with pitches I wouldn't have if I was going badly." The Dodgers' only run came in the ninth inning on what newspapers described as a successful hit and run play in which Mike Marshall on a 2-2 count doubled Kirk Gibson in from first base. However, as recalled by Marshall: "Let me tell you, it wasn't a hit-and-run. Gibby was probably going with two strikes. We never would hit-and-run with us. You can call it a run-and-hit." Orel and wife Jamie scheduled induced labor for the following day, an off day for the Dodgers.

Excerpted Play-by-Play

Legend
| Score | Runs already scored by the batting and defensive team separated by a "–" |
| # of outs | The number of outs prior to the play |
| Runners on base | Baserunners' base positions |
| Pitch # of play (count) | The number of pitches in the at bat and (count) |
| Result of play | The result of the play in terms of outs and runs |
| Batter | Name of the batter |
| Play description | Play result in baseball scorekeeping language and notation |

September 14, 1988 Excerpted Play-by-Play
| Score | # of outs | Runners on base | Pitch # of play (count) | Result of play | Batter | Play description |
September 14, 1988, Top of the 3rd, Braves Batting, Tied 0-0, Dodgers' Orel Hershiser facing the 7th, 8th, and 9th positions in the batting order
| 0-0 | 0 | none on | 2,(0-1) | | O. Virgil | Single to RF (Line Drive) |
| 0-0 | 0 | 1st | 1,(0-0) | | T. Blocker | Single to RF (Ground Ball thru 2B-1B); Virgil to 2B |
| 0-0 | 0 | 1st & 2nd | 5,(2-2) | out | R. Mahler | Strikeout (foul bunt) |
| 0-0 | 1 | 1st & 2nd | 6,(2-2) | out | R. Gant | Strikeout Looking |
| 0-0 | 2 | 1st & 2nd | 5,(2-2) | out | J. Blauser | Flyball: LF |
0 runs, 2 hits, 0 errors, 2 LOB. Braves 0, Dodgers 0.
September 14, 1988, Top of the 7th, Braves Batting, Tied 0-0, Dodgers' Orel Hershiser facing 5-6-7
| 0-0 | 0 | none on | 1,(0-0) | | A. Thomas | Double to LF (Fly Ball to Deep LF-CF) |
| 0-0 | 0 | 2nd | 2,(1-0) | | D. James | Reached on E3 (Ground Ball); Thomas to 3B; James to 1B |
| 0-0 | 0 | 1st & 3rd | 3,(1-1) | out | O. Virgil | Ground out: 1B unassisted; James to 2B |
| 0-0 | 1 | 2nd & 3rd | 4,(3-0) | | T. Blocker | Intentional Walk |
| 0-0 | 1 | 1st, 2nd & 3rd | 3,(0-2) | out | R. Mahler | Strikeout Swinging |
| 0-0 | 2 | 1st, 2nd & 3rd | 2,(1-0) | out | R. Gant | Flyball: LF |
0 runs, 1 hit, 1 error, 3 LOB. Braves 0, Dodgers 0.

Legend
| Score | Runs already scored by the batting and defensive team separated by a "–" |
| # of outs | The number of outs prior to the play |
| Runners on base | Baserunners' base positions represented with a 1, 2 and/or 3 in the 1st, 2nd or 3rd place |
| Pitch # of play (count) | The number of pitches in the at bat and (count) |
| Result of play | The result of the play in terms of outs and runs |
| Batter's team | Name of the team that the batter plays for |
| Batter | Name of the batter |
| Pitcher | Name of the pitcher |
| Play description | Play result in baseball scorekeeping language and notation |

| Score | # of outs | Runners on base | Pitch # of play (count) | Result of play | Batter's team | Batter | Pitcher | Play description |
September 14, 1988, Bottom of the 9th, Dodgers Batting, Tied 0–0, Braves' Rick Mahler facing the 3rd, 4th, and 5th positions in the batting order
| 0–0 | 0 | none on | 7,(3–2) | | LAD | K. Gibson | R. Mahler | Walk |
| 0–0 | 0 | 1st | 5,(2–2) | run | LAD | M. Marshall | R. Mahler | Double to LF (Line Drive to LF Line); Gibson Scores |
1 run, 1 hit, 0 errors, 1 LOB. Braves 0, Dodgers 1.

=== September 19, 1988 ===
September 19, 1988 7:35 at Astrodome, Houston, Texas
| Team | 1 | 2 | 3 | 4 | 5 | 6 | 7 | 8 | 9 | R | H | E |
|---|---|---|---|---|---|---|---|---|---|---|---|---|
| Los Angeles | 0 | 0 | 0 | 0 | 0 | 0 | 1 | 0 | 0 | 1 | 3 | 2 |
| Houston | 0 | 0 | 0 | 0 | 0 | 0 | 0 | 0 | 0 | 0 | 4 | 2 |
Starting pitchers: LAD: Orel Hershiser; HOU: Nolan Ryan; WP: Orel Hershiser (22–8) LP: Danny Darwin (7–12); Home runs: LAD: John Shelby (8, off D Darwin; 7th inn, 0 on, 0 outs to Deep CF-RF); HOU: None; Attendance: 16,173 (Time: 2:20)

The Dodgers entered the game with an 86–61 record and a nine-game lead in the NL West over the Astros and Giants, each of whom held a 78–71 record. With the September 19 win, the Dodgers held a 9.5-game lead over the Reds. The game marked Hershiser's second consecutive 1–0 victory. The game marked Nolan Ryan's final start for the Astros. He pitched two innings (striking out four Dodgers) before leaving the game because of a hamstring cramp. Hershiser retired the final 13 batters in a row. Based on the rules in place on September 20, Hershiser would have ended up 2/3 inning shy of Drysdale's record even with two nine-inning shutouts in his final two starts. Jackson also won his 22nd game that night. Hershiser's ERA in the seven consecutive complete games had fallen to 0.57. Houston's strongest scoring opportunities came about because of Dodger errors: Kevin Bass recorded a two-out single followed by a stolen base. Then a Griffin error on a Glenn Davis ground ball moved the runner to third base and dangerously close to home plate. Also, in the fifth inning Stubbs' error put runners on first and second with no outs. The game marked Hershiser's sixth (and fourth consecutive) shutout of the season, making him the first Dodger since Drysdale in 1968 to record four in a row. This performance of September 19 was the middle of three consecutive shutouts posted by the Dodgers. Tudor posted one on September 18 with relief from Alejandro Peña; Tim Belcher pitched a shutout on September 20.

On September 19, Hershiser's four-day-old son Jordan was suffering from fluid buildup in his lungs in a Pasadena hospital. Hershiser, by winning that day, reduced the Dodgers' magic number to five over the Reds. Publications such as The New York Times, the Chicago Tribune and the Los Angeles Times began to take note of the streak length and the nearer horizon of the record as Hershiser reached 40 consecutive innings with this win. Several Canadian newspapers even used the word chasing to note Hershiser's progress—e.g., The Ottawa Citizen ran a story titled "Hershiser chasing record."

Excerpted Play-by-Play

Legend
| Score | Runs already scored by the batting and defensive team separated by a "–" |
| # of outs | The number of outs prior to the play |
| Runners on base | Baserunners' base positions |
| Pitch # of play (count) | The number of pitches in the at bat and (count) |
| Result of play | The result of the play in terms of outs and runs |
| Batter | Name of the batter |
| Play description | Play result in baseball scorekeeping language and notation |

September 19, 1988 Excerpted Play-by-Play
| Score | # of outs | Runners on base | Pitch # of play (count) | Result of play | Batter | Play description |
September 19, 1988, Bottom of the 1st, Astros Batting, Tied 0-0, Dodgers' Orel Hershiser facing the 1st, 2nd, and 3rd positions in the batting order
| 0-0 | 0 | none on | 2,(1-0) | out | G. Young | Flyball: LF (LF-CF) |
| 0-0 | 1 | none on | 3,(2-0) | out | B. Doran | Flyball: LF |
| 0-0 | 2 | none on | 1,(0-0) | | K. Bass | Single to LF (Line Drive) |
| 0-0 | 2 | 1st | 4,(1-2) | | G. Davis | Bass Steals 2B |
| 0-0 | 2 | 2nd | 5,(2-2) | | G. Davis | Reached on E6 (Ground Ball); Bass to 3B |
| 0-0 | 2 | 1st & 3rd | 7,(2-2) | out | B. Bell | Ground out: 2B-1B |
0 runs, 1 hit, 1 error, 2 LOB. Dodgers 0, Astros 0.
September 19, 1988, Bottom of the 5th, Astros Batting, Tied 0-0, Dodgers' Orel Hershiser facing 7-8-9
| 0-0 | 0 | none on | 1,(0-0) | out | C. Drew | Ground out: 1B-P |
| 0-0 | 1 | none on | 2,(1-0) | | R. Ramírez | Single to CF (Line Drive to CF-RF) |
| 0-0 | 1 | 1st | 1,(0-0) | out | D. Darwin | Ground out: P-SS/Forceout at 2B |
| 0-0 | 2 | 1st | 2,(1-0) | | G. Young | Reached on E3 (Ground Ball); Darwin to 2B |
| 0-0 | 2 | 1st & 2nd | 3,(2-0) | out | C. Candaele | Flyball: LF (Deep LF) |
0 runs, 1 hit, 1 error, 2 LOB. Dodgers 0, Astros 0.

=== September 23, 1988 ===
September 23, 1988 7:39 at Candlestick Park, San Francisco, California
| Team | 1 | 2 | 3 | 4 | 5 | 6 | 7 | 8 | 9 | R | H | E |
|---|---|---|---|---|---|---|---|---|---|---|---|---|
| Los Angeles | 0 | 0 | 0 | 0 | 0 | 0 | 0 | 3 | 0 | 3 | 7 | 0 |
| San Francisco | 0 | 0 | 0 | 0 | 0 | 0 | 0 | 0 | 0 | 0 | 5 | 1 |
WP: Orel Hershiser (23–8) LP: Atlee Hammaker (8–9); Home runs: LAD: Mickey Hatcher (1, off Hammaker; 8th inn, 2 on, 2 outs); SF: None; Attendance: 22,341 (Time: 2:38)

In order that Hershiser and the rest of the staff could have their normal number of days of rest heading into the playoff series that could start as early as October 3, Hershiser pitched on only three days' rest rather than making his regular start on September 24. The Dodgers entered the game with an 89–63 record and an eight-game lead in the NL West over the Cincinnati Reds, while the San Francisco Giants were 10.5 games back in fourth place in the division with a 79–74 record entering the game. With the September 23 win, the Dodgers retained an eight-game lead over the Reds. The victory reduced the Dodgers' magic number to two. The game marked Hershiser's eighth consecutive complete game and fifteenth of the season and Hershiser's fifth consecutive complete game shutout, which stretched his consecutive scoreless inning streak to 49. Following the game, Hershiser was quoted as saying, "I want to keep putting zeroes up there — not because of the streak, but for the team.... I want to stay hot right up through the playoffs."

Prior to the start, Seymour Siwoff, the Elias Sports Bureau chief and official statistician for MLB, determined that the official method of accounting for consecutive scoreless innings would count only whole innings for starting pitchers and that if the streak extended into 1989 it would bear an asterisk. Previously there had been division among various sources on whether to include fractional innings. According to some sources, official statisticians such as Siwoff had a long history of counting only complete scoreless innings by starting pitchers. Hershiser's September 23 shutout lifted him to third on the all-time consecutive scoreless innings list, behind Johnson and Drysdale. He also passed Carl Hubbell and G. Harris "Doc" White, each of whom had streaks of 45 innings on the newly redefined record's list, and Bob Gibson, who had a streak of 47 before the record was redefined. Hershiser also became one of three pitchers to throw five consecutive shutouts, joining Drysdale, who did it in 1968, and White, who did it in 1904. His 23 wins were the most by a Dodger since Sandy Koufax had won 27 games in 1966.

During the third inning of the September 23 game, according to articles written by ESPN and the Los Angeles Times, after José Uribe and Atlee Hammaker got on base with consecutive singles, Brett Butler grounded into a force out at second base to leave Uribe on third and Butler on first. When Ernie Riles hit a groundball, Butler interfered with Dodger shortstop Alfredo Griffin causing a bad throw and breaking up the double play. A run was posted on the scoreboard after Uribe crossed home plate. However, Bob Engel ruled that the double play had been broken up by interference, making the play a double play. This allowed the streak to continue beyond 42 innings. Contemporaneous sources such as The Washington Post and Los Angeles Times noted that, when Butler swiped at Griffin's leg, Griffin threw over the head of Tracy Woodson. Other contemporaneous sources such as Sports Illustrated and USA Today said that Paul Runge ruled that Butler had interfered with second baseman Steve Sax's relay throw to Griffin. Several sources noted that, late in Drysdale's streak, Drysdale benefited similarly when Harry Wendelstedt nullified Dick Dietz's bases-loaded hit by pitch for failing to attempt to avoid the pitch.

Hershiser retired the side in order in the fourth, fifth and sixth innings. In the game, Giants manager Roger Craig made what some describe as a questionable pinch hitting substitution. In order to contest Hershiser with a left-handed batter, with runners on first and second and one out, he substituted rookie Francisco Meléndez (batting .190) for Robby Thompson (batting .266), which resulted in an inning-ending double play. That day, USA Today claimed that Dodgers manager Tommy Lasorda had determined his postseason pitching rotation with Hershiser slated for Game 1 of the NLCS, but Lasorda denied having any plan in place for a playoff appearance that had not yet been clinched. The Dodgers' runs came on Mickey Hatcher's first home run of the season in the eighth inning.

Excerpted Play-by-Play

Legend
| Score | Runs already scored by the batting and defensive team separated by a "–" |
| # of outs | The number of outs prior to the play |
| Runners on base | Baserunners' base positions |
| Pitch # of play (count) | The number of pitches in the at bat and (count) |
| Result of play | The result of the play in terms of outs and runs |
| Batter | Name of the batter |
| Play description | Play result in baseball scorekeeping language and notation |

September 23, 1988 Excerpted Play-by-Play
| Score | # of outs | Runners on base | Pitch # of play (count) | Result of play | Batter | Play description |
September 23, 1988, Bottom of the 3rd, Giants Batting, Tied 0–0, Dodgers' Orel Hershiser facing the 8th, 9th, and 1st positions in the batting order
| 0–0 | 0 | none on | 2,(0–1) | | J. Uribe | Single to LF (Ground Ball thru SS-3B Hole) |
| 0–0 | 0 | 1st | 3,(0–2) | | A. Hammaker | Single to SS (Bunt to Weak 2B); Uribe to 2B |
| 0–0 | 0 | 1st & 2nd | 5,(2–2) | out | B. Butler | Ground out: 3B-2B/Forceout at 2B; Uribe to 3B |
| 0–0 | 1 | 1st & 3rd | 3,(1–1) | 2 outs | E. Riles | Ground Ball Double Play: 2B-SS-1B |
0 runs, 2 hits, 0 errors, 1 LOB. Dodgers 0, Giants 0.
September 23, 1988, Bottom of the 7th, Giants Batting, Tied 0-0, Dodgers' Orel Hershiser facing 3-4-5
| 0-0 | 0 | none on | 5,(2-2) | | W. Clark | Single to CF (Line Drive to Short CF) |
| 0-0 | 0 | 1st | 1,(0-0) | out | C. Maldonado | Bunt Ground out: P-1B/Sacrifice; Clark to 2B |
| 0-0 | 1 | 2nd | 5,(3-1) | | M. Aldrete | Intentional Walk |
Francisco Meléndez pinch hits for Robby Thompson (2B) batting 6th
| 0-0 | 1 | 1st & 2nd | 1,(0-0) | 2 outs | F. Melendez | Ground Ball Double Play: P-SS-1B |
0 runs, 1 hit, 0 errors, 1 LOB. Dodgers 0, Giants 0.

=== September 28, 1988 ===
September 28, 1988 7:10 at Jack Murphy Stadium, San Diego, California
| Team | 1 | 2 | 3 | 4 | 5 | 6 | 7 | 8 | 9 | 10 | 11 | 12 | 13 | 14 | 15 | 16 | R | H | E |
|---|---|---|---|---|---|---|---|---|---|---|---|---|---|---|---|---|---|---|---|
| Los Angeles | 0 | 0 | 0 | 0 | 0 | 0 | 0 | 0 | 0 | 0 | 0 | 0 | 0 | 0 | 0 | 1 | 1 | 6 | 1 |
| San Diego | 0 | 0 | 0 | 0 | 0 | 0 | 0 | 0 | 0 | 0 | 0 | 0 | 0 | 0 | 0 | 2 | 2 | 5 | 2 |
Starting pitchers: LAD: Orel Hershiser; SD: Andy Hawkins; WP: Dave Leiper (3–0) LP: Ricky Horton (7–11); Home runs: LAD: None; SD: Mark Parent (6, off Horton; 16th inn, 1 on, 2 outs to Deep LF); Attendance: 22,596 (Time: 4:24)

As his turn in the rotation approached, Hershiser joked that he would skip a start and rest for the playoffs rather than pursue the record. The Dodgers had clinched the NL West on September 26. Thus, the focus of the game on the 28th was on Hershiser's need to get nine scoreless innings to tie Drysdale, which was Hershiser's hope. On September 27, Lasorda announced the Dodger starting pitchers for Game 1 (Hershiser) and Game 2 (Tudor) of the NL Championship series, which would begin the following Tuesday, October 4. The Dodgers entered the game with a 92–65 record and a seven-game lead in the NL West over the Cincinnati Reds, while the San Diego Padres were 13 games back in fifth place in the division with a 79–78 record entering the game. With the September 28 loss, the Dodgers retained a seven-game lead over the Reds. In the off days leading up to Hershiser's last start, Frank Viola had tied Jackson and Hershiser at 23 wins for the MLB lead.

Hershiser had ended Padres catcher Benito Santiago's 34-game hitting streak the year before and the Padres were eager to snap Hershiser's streak. Santiago's streak was an MLB record for a catcher, an MLB record for a rookie and a team record for the Padres. No one who has started a hitting streak at age 22 or younger has matched the streak since. According to Tony Gwynn, "We wanted so badly to put a run on the board.... Maybe, we tried a little too hard. You have to give the man credit. He didn't give me one decent pitch to hit all night. He put everything right where he wanted it to go."

Prior to the game Hershiser explained why he wanted to win a World Series more than break the scoreless innings streak: "You can break a record or win a Cy Young and go home and celebrate with your wife and friends, but after it's over there's only a few people that really care about it. But if you win a team thing, you've got 24 guys and all their families, all their friends, a whole city celebrating."

Hershiser picked Roberto Alomar off at first base to end the eighth inning. When the game went into extra innings, Hershiser did not want to continue: "I really didn't want to break it," Hershiser said. "I wanted to stop at 58. I wanted me and Don to be together at the top. But the higher sources (Lasorda and Perranoski) told me they weren't taking me out of the game, so I figured, what the heck, I might as well get the guy out." Through the first nine innings, no Padre had reached second base. Lasorda, Perranoski and Ben Hines all believed that he owed it to the game and to himself to continue. Hershiser made it through the 10th inning, with the record-setting out being a Keith Moreland flyball caught by right fielder José González. However, he had some close calls in a couple of innings. Marvell Wynne struck out swinging to open the inning, but reached first base after a wild pitch evaded catcher Mike Scioscia. The following two hitters, Santiago and Randy Ready, moved Wynne over to third with two outs. Then, Garry Templeton was given an intentional base on balls. Templeton advanced to second base before the final out was recorded.

Even after achieving the record, Hershiser expressed regret: "Because of respect for Don and respect for the record, I don't think I should have walked to the mound in a situation where I'm supposed to be resting for the playoffs, just to beat a record. That would have tarnished the whole thing." According to some sources, Drysdale was the person who convinced Hershiser to take the mound for the 10th inning, saying, "I gave him a kick in the pants and told him to get out there and go as far as he can." However, other sources state that Drysdale merely said that, if he had known about Hershiser's hesitance to break the record, he would have reassured him, saying, "I'd have kicked him right in the rear if I had known that.... I'd have told him to get his buns out there and get them."

When the 10th inning ended, giving Hershiser the record, he "stood bent with his hands on his knees for a long moment after the final out and then was inundated by teammates pouring out of the dugout to congratulate him." Drysdale served as the Dodger radio broadcast announcer with Vin Scully that year. As Hershiser left the mound with the record in hand, he was searching for Drysdale and saying, "Where is Drysdale? I've got to find Drysdale." Drysdale was on hand to congratulate Hershiser after the game. In fact, when Hershiser returned to the dugout, Drysdale was waiting with his microphone for an interview.

During Hershiser's streak he posted 59 IP, 0 runs, 31 hits, 38 strikeouts, 10 walks, and three extra-base hits, while Drysdale had posted 58 IP, 0 runs, 28 hits, 45 strikeouts, 10 walks, and three extra-base hits. Drysdale maintained the record for consecutive shutouts (six) because Hershiser did not pitch beyond the first 10 innings of his September 28 start because it lasted 16 innings. Hershiser's record was overshadowed because the 1988 Summer Olympics and the start of the 1988 National Football League season occurred at the same time. Los Angeles had two NFL teams at the time (Los Angeles Rams and Los Angeles Raiders). Additionally, baseball fans were more concerned with pennant races. Furthermore, four of the final five games in the streak were played in the Pacific Time Zone, limiting the games' visibility to the rest of the country. Controversially, KTTV did not broadcast either the September 26 game in which the Dodgers clinched the NL West or the September 28 game in which Hershiser set the record. Instead, it showed Friday the 13th and The Funhouse on September 26 and 28, respectively. The record-setting game drew an attendance of 22,596.

Excerpted Play-by-Play

Legend
| Score | Runs already scored by the batting and defensive team separated by a "–" |
| # of outs | The number of outs prior to the play |
| Runners on base | Baserunners' base positions |
| Pitch # of play (count) | The number of pitches in the at bat and (count) |
| Result of play | The result of the play in terms of outs and runs |
| Batter | Name of the batter |
| Play description | Play result in baseball scorekeeping language and notation |

September 28, 1988 Excerpted Play-by-Play
| Score | # of outs | Runners on base | Pitch # of play (count) | Result of play | Batter | Play description |
September 28, 1988, Bottom of the 10th, Padres Batting, Tied 0–0, Dodgers' Orel Hershiser facing the 5th, 6th, and 7th positions in the batting order
| 0–0 | 0 | none on | 4,(1–2) | | M. Wynne | Strikeout Swinging, Wild Pitch; Wynne to 1B |
| 0–0 | 0 | 1st | 3,(1–1) | out | B. Santiago | Bunt Ground out: P-2B/Sacrifice; Wynne to 2B |
| 0–0 | 1 | 2nd | 2,(1–0) | out | R. Ready | Ground out: SS-1B; Wynne to 3B |
| 0–0 | 2 | 3rd | 4,(3–0) | | G. Templeton | Intentional Walk |
Keith Moreland pinch hits for Andy Hawkins (P) batting 9th
| 0–0 | 2 | 1st & 3rd | 1,(0–0) | | K. Moreland | Defensive Indifference; Templeton to 2B |
| 0–0 | 2 | 2nd & 3rd | 5,(1–2) | out | K. Moreland | Flyball: RF |
0 runs, 0 hits, 0 errors, 2 LOB. Dodgers 0, Padres 0.

=== October 4, 1988 ===
October 4, 1988 5:25 at Dodger Stadium, Los Angeles, California
| Team | 1 | 2 | 3 | 4 | 5 | 6 | 7 | 8 | 9 | R | H | E |
|---|---|---|---|---|---|---|---|---|---|---|---|---|
| New York | 0 | 0 | 0 | 0 | 0 | 0 | 0 | 0 | 3 | 3 | 8 | 1 |
| Los Angeles | 1 | 0 | 0 | 0 | 0 | 0 | 1 | 0 | 0 | 2 | 4 | 0 |
Starting pitchers: NYM: Dwight Gooden; LAD: Orel Hershiser; WP: Randy Myers (1–0) LP: Jay Howell (0–1); Attendance: 55,582 (Time: 2:45)

The New York Mets concluded the regular season with a record of 100–60 while the Dodgers had a 94–67 record. The Mets had won 10 of the 11 head-to-head regular season contests and were the favorite in the series. On October 4, 1988, Hershiser posted eight scoreless innings in Game 1 of the 1988 NL Championship Series (bringing his unofficial total of consecutive scoreless innings to 67) before surrendering runs in the ninth inning. In both the third and sixth innings the Mets got two runners on base only to have the third out recorded on infield grounders to Hershiser. In the ninth inning, Gregg Jefferies led off with a single on a sinker down the middle and reached second base on a ground out in a hit and run play with Keith Hernandez. Jefferies, a rookie, recorded his third hit in four at bats in his first ever appearance against Hershiser. With Jefferies on second, Darryl Strawberry posted an RBI double on a pitch he described as up in the strike zone. Strawberry had fouled off four fastballs before getting what Lasorda called a hanging curveball. After Hershiser gave up a run in the ninth inning 100 pitches into his performance, pitching coach Perranoski removed him from the game by signaling for a double switch before getting to the mound to talk to Hershiser. The Dodgers' bullpen had led the league in saves that year. Howell had recorded 18 consecutive scoreless innings in relief. Howell's scoreless streak was longer in calendar days, his last runs allowed occurring on August 11. It had been 35 days since anyone had scored a run against Hershiser. Controversially, Mets pitcher David Cone attributed Hershiser's success to luck after the Mets rallied to score against him in the ninth inning. The Mets went on to add two more runs on Gary Carter's shallow fly ball that center fielder John Shelby could not secure until it first hit the ground. The ball bounced out of his glove as he lunged for the catch, yielding the tying and winning runs. Despite the results, Hershiser's scoreless inning streak in the regular season was still intact at 59 consecutive innings, as the runs scored against him on October 4 were in the postseason.

Excerpted Play-by-Play

Legend
| Score | Runs already scored by the batting and defensive team separated by a "–" |
| # of outs | The number of outs prior to the play |
| Runners on base | Baserunners' base positions |
| Pitch # of play (count) | The number of pitches in the at bat and (count) |
| Result of play | The result of the play in terms of outs and runs |
| Batter | Name of the batter |
| Play description | Play result in baseball scorekeeping language and notation |

October 4, 1988 Excerpted Play-by-Play
| Score | # of outs | Runners on base | Pitch # of play (count) | Result of play | Batter | Play description |
October 4, 1988, Top of the 3rd, Mets Batting, Behind 0-1, Dodgers' Orel Hershiser facing the 7th, 8th, and 9th positions in the batting order
| 0-1 | 0 | none on | 3,(1-1) | | G. Carter | Single to 3B (Ground Ball to Weak 3B) |
| 0-1 | 0 | 1st | 2,(1-0) | out | W. Backman | Bunt Ground out: 3B-1B/Sacrifice (Weak 3B); Carter to 2B |
| 0-1 | 1 | 2nd | 4,(1-2) | out | D. Gooden | Strikeout Swinging |
| 0-1 | 2 | 2nd | 4,(2-1) | | M. Wilson | Single to RF (Line Drive to 2B-1B); Carter to 3B |
| 0-1 | 2 | 1st & 3rd | 2,(1-0) | out | G. Jefferies | Ground out: P-1B |
0 runs, 2 hits, 0 errors, 2 LOB. Mets 0, Dodgers 1.
October 4, 1988, Top of the 6th, Mets Batting, Behind 0-1, Dodgers' Orel Hershiser facing 9-1-2
| 0-1 | 0 | none on | 3,(0-2) | out | D. Gooden | Strikeout Looking |
| 0-1 | 1 | none on | 1,(0-0) | out | M. Wilson | Ground out: SS-1B (SS-3B Hole) |
| 0-1 | 2 | none on | 2,(1-0) | | G. Jefferies | Single to LF (Ground Ball thru SS-3B Hole) |
| 0-1 | 2 | 1st | 1,(0-0) | | K. Hernandez | Single to CF (Line Drive to Deep SS-2B); Jefferies to 3B |
| 0-1 | 2 | 1st & 3rd | 4,(2-1) | out | D. Strawberry | Ground out: 1B unassisted |
0 runs, 2 hits, 0 errors, 2 LOB. Mets 0, Dodgers 1.
October 4, 1988, Top of the 9th, Mets Batting, Behind 0-2, Dodgers' Orel Hershiser facing 2-3-4
Tracy Woodson moves from PH to 1B
| 0-2 | 0 | none on | 2,(1-0) | | G. Jefferies | Single to CF (Ground Ball thru SS-2B) |
| 0-2 | 0 | 1st | 1,(0-0) | out | K. Hernandez | Ground out: 1B unassisted; Jefferies to 2B |
| 0-2 | 1 | 2nd | 7,(2-2) | run | D. Strawberry | Double to CF (Line Drive to CF-RF); Jefferies Scores |
Jay Howell replaces Kirk Gibson (LF) pitching and batting 3rd. Jose González replaces Orel Hershiser (P) playing LF batting 9th
| 1-2 | 1 | 2nd | 5,(3-1) | | K. McReynolds | Walk |
| 1-2 | 1 | 1st & 2nd | 5,(1-2) | out | H. Johnson | Strikeout Swinging |
| 1-2 | 2 | 1st & 2nd | 3,(0-2) | 2 runs | G. Carter | Double to CF (Line Drive); Strawberry Scores; McReynolds Scores |
| 3-2 | 2 | 2nd | 4,(0-2) | out | W. Backman | Ground out: 2B-1B |
3 runs, 3 hits, 0 errors, 1 LOB. Mets 3, Dodgers 2.

=== April 5, 1989 ===
April 5, 1989 7:35 at Riverfront Stadium, Cincinnati
| Team | 1 | 2 | 3 | 4 | 5 | 6 | 7 | 8 | 9 | R | H | E |
|---|---|---|---|---|---|---|---|---|---|---|---|---|
| Los Angeles | 0 | 1 | 0 | 0 | 1 | 0 | 0 | 1 | 0 | 3 | 5 | 3 |
| Cincinnati | 1 | 0 | 1 | 1 | 0 | 0 | 1 | 0 | x | 4 | 7 | 1 |
WP: Tom Browning (1–0) LP: Orel Hershiser (0–1) Sv: John Franco (2); Attendance: 20,964 (Time: 2:45)

The Dodgers entered the game with a 0–1 record, having lost to the Reds, who were 1–0 the day before. As Hershiser prepared for his first start, he said that the continuation of the streak via the asterisk did not mean much to him and that in his mind the streak was already over. His mound opponent was Tom Browning, who had pitched a perfect game the last time he had faced the Dodgers (September 16, 1988). Todd Benzinger drove in Larkin to end Hershiser's streak in the first inning and Hershiser was tagged with his first loss since August 24. The Dodgers endured three errors and a passed ball in the game. Leadoff hitter Larkin chopped a groundball over Hershiser into centerfield. Hershiser's pick off throw hit Larkin's armpit. After Hershiser retired Chris Sabo and Eric Davis via strikeout, he walked Kal Daniels, who had a career .500 batting average and four home runs against Hershiser, on four pitches. Then Benzinger, with whom Hershiser was unfamiliar, singled through the right side of the Dodger infield to score Larkin, thus ending Hershiser's streak. Howell did not allow an earned run in his second 1989 outing on April 10. Thus, Howell's streak went from August 11, 1988, through April 9, 1989.

Excerpted Play-by-Play

Legend
| Score | Runs already scored by the batting and defensive team separated by a "–" |
| # of outs | The number of outs prior to the play |
| Runners on base | Baserunners' base positions |
| Pitch # of play (count) | The number of pitches in the at bat and (count) |
| Result of play | The result of the play in terms of outs and runs |
| Batter | Name of the batter |
| Play description | Play result in baseball scorekeeping language and notation |

April 5, 1989 Excerpted Play-by-Play
| Score | # of outs | Runners on base | Pitch # of play (count) | Result of play | Batter | Play description |
April 5, 1989, Bottom of the 1st, Reds Batting, Tied 0–0, Dodgers' Orel Hershiser facing the 1st, 2nd, and 3rd positions in the batting order
| 0–0 | 0 | none on | 3,(1–1) | | B. Larkin | Single to CF (Ground Ball) |
| 0–0 | 0 | 1st | 3,(1–2) | | C. Sabo | Larkin Picked off 1B, safe on E1; Larkin to 2B |
| 0–0 | 0 | 2nd | 5,(2–2) | out | C. Sabo | Strikeout Looking |
| 0–0 | 1 | 2nd | 3,(0–2) | out | E. Davis | Strikeout Swinging |
| 0–0 | 2 | 2nd | 4,(3–0) | | K. Daniels | Walk |
| 0–0 | 2 | 1st & 2nd | 3,(2–0) | run | T. Benzinger | Single to RF (Line Drive); Larkin Scores; Daniels to 3B |
| 1–0 | 2 | 1st & 3rd | 3,(2–0) | out | P. O'Neill | Ground out: P-1B (P's Right) |
1 run, 2 hits, 1 error, 2 LOB. Dodgers 0, Reds 1.

== Reaction and outcome ==
It had been unlikely that Hershiser would ever become a successful major league pitcher. He was unable to make his high school varsity team until he was a junior, and he went undrafted as a high schooler. He failed to make the Bowling Green State University team as a freshman and, after graduating, he struggled through two years in both Double A and Triple A baseball. Drysdale said that he enjoyed rooting for Hershiser because his jersey number, 55, like Drysdale's own number, 53, indicated that Hershiser had been a long shot to make the majors (lower numbers were generally assigned to better prospects). After the record was broken, Drysdale said that he was not surprised that his record was broken. Even though Hershiser had the second-best (behind Dwight Gooden) career ERA among active pitchers, he believed that someone would surpass the record because he did not think that he was that great a pitcher, saying, "I think someone's going to break it from me because I know I'm not any big deal."

After his NLCS Game 1 performance, Hershiser went on to post a 21 1/3 scoreless innings streak in the 1988 NL Championship Series and 1988 World Series, winning both the NL Championship Series Most Valuable Player (MVP) Award and the World Series MVP Award. Hershiser also won the 1988 NL Cy Young Award. Hershiser's season was recognized outside of baseball as well. He earned the Sportsman of the Year from Sports Illustrated in December and Associated Press Athlete of the Year in January 1989, becoming the first non-Olympian to win the award in an Olympic year in 20 years. After seeking arbitration in January, Hershiser signed a new three-year, $7.9 million contract on February 16. Hershiser's annual salary of $2,766,667 (equal to $7,185,907 in 2025 dollars) moved him ahead of Cal Ripken as baseball's highest-paid player at the time. Following his success of the 1988 season, Hershiser realized that any future exploits would be seen comparatively as a failure, even as he began spring training in 1989 with the streak still active.

Hershiser's combined single-season total of 309 2/3 innings pitched including both the regular season and postseason has not been surpassed since 1988. Nonetheless, he would lead the NL in innings pitched for a third consecutive season in 1989. Hershiser's statistics in 1989 were nearly identical to 1988 except for his win–loss record. Two wins during the 1988 streak were against the Atlanta Braves. Hershiser would eventually win 12 consecutive decisions against the Braves (a post-1920 record for a pitcher against a single franchise). His 1–0 win on September 14 over the Braves and 1–0 win over the Astros on September 19 were the last of his three career 1–0 victories. After posting seven shutouts in his previous 11 starts, he was able to tally only six more in his remaining 319 career starts. Hershiser was selected to the 1989 MLB All-Star Game and also contributed to two Cleveland Indians World Series runs (1995 and 1997), earning another League Championship Series MVP in 1995.

=== Historical context ===
Some sports historians consider Hershiser's record to be among baseball's most outstanding records. In Baseball's Top 100: The Game's Greatest Records by Kerry Banks, Hershiser's streak is ranked as the seventh-greatest baseball record. One commentator, ESPN's Jeff Merron, named it the third-greatest individual streak in American sports history, behind Joe DiMaggio's 56-game hitting streak and Edwin Moses' 107 straight hurdles finals wins.

The record that Hershiser broke was regarded as "one of the most unbreakable records in baseball". In 2013, the 25th anniversary of Hershiser's record-breaking season was widely heralded in the press. ESPN, Los Angeles Daily News, and SB Nation are among the media outlets that covered the anniversary. SB Nation ran stories on the 25th anniversary of each of Hershiser's starts during the streak. Baseball Digest celebrated the accomplishment with stories during the 10th, 15th and 20th anniversary seasons.

== Subsequent challenges ==
In the first 25 years after Hershiser recorded his streak, the closest challenge came from Brandon Webb of the 2007 Arizona Diamondbacks, who pitched 42 consecutive scoreless innings. Greg Maddux and Kenny Rogers were the only other pitchers to have reached 39 innings during that time period.

In 2014, Dodgers ace Clayton Kershaw pitched 41 consecutive scoreless innings, before giving up a solo home run to the Padres' Chase Headley on July 10. In 2015 another Dodger, Zack Greinke, maintained a streak of 45 2/3 consecutive innings without allowing a run. It ended on July 26.

In 2022, Diamondbacks pitcher Zac Gallen threw 44 1/3 consecutive scoreless innings.

In 2026, Phillies pitcher Cristopher Sánchez threw 50 2/3 consecutive scoreless innings before giving up an RBI single to Jackson Merrill of the Padres on June 3. He came the closest to breaking Hershiser's record since it was set in 1988, and would ultimately set the scoreless record for left-handed pitchers.

== See also ==
- Scoreless innings streak
