= Scoreless innings streak =

Number of consecutive innings a baseball pitcher does not allow a run

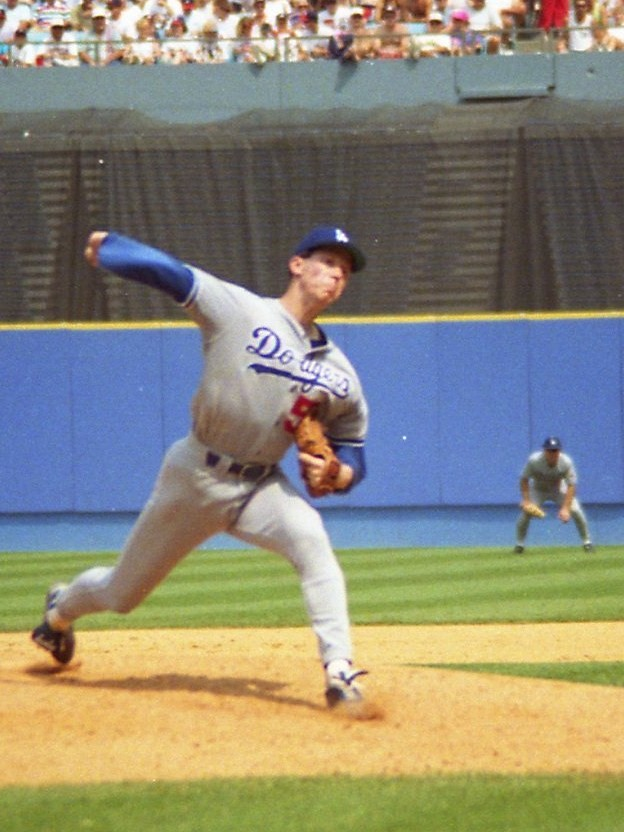
Orel Hershiser's 59 scoreless innings in 1988 is a Major League Baseball record.

In baseball, a scoreless innings streak is the number of consecutive official innings in which a pitcher appears and allows no runs. Such a streak will end when the pitcher allows a run, earned or unearned. Since 1998, the Official Baseball Rules state that a pitcher does not get credit for any outs recorded during an inning in which he is charged with an earned or unearned run.

Orel Hershiser holds the Major League Baseball record of 59 consecutive scoreless innings which began on August 20, 1988 and ended on September 28, 1988, breaking Don Drysdale's record of 58 consecutive scoreless innings in 1968, the "Year of the Pitcher." Drysdale, Hershiser, and Cristopher Sánchez are the only pitchers to record a 50-inning streak in the live ball era; Walter Johnson and Jack Coombs both also recorded 50 consecutive scoreless innings, with Johnson's 55-inning streak being the MLB record for 55 years and still being the American League record and Coombs' 53-inning streak being the record before that. Additionally, Sánchez holds the record for longest streak by a left-hander, breaking Carl Hubbell's 93-year-old record in June 2026.

Mariano Rivera holds the postseason record for consecutive scoreless innings, with 33 1/3. The second-longest postseason streak was pitched by Whitey Ford, whose 33 consecutive scoreless innings is a World Series record; Ford broke Babe Ruth's 43-year-old record of 29 scoreless innings. Christy Mathewson holds the National League record with 28 consecutive scoreless innings in the postseason.

== Major League Baseball ==
=== Regular season ===
The following is a list of Major League pitchers with at least 40 consecutive scoreless innings pitched. Only Walter Johnson and Luis Tiant have multiple streaks of at least 40 scoreless innings, with two each.

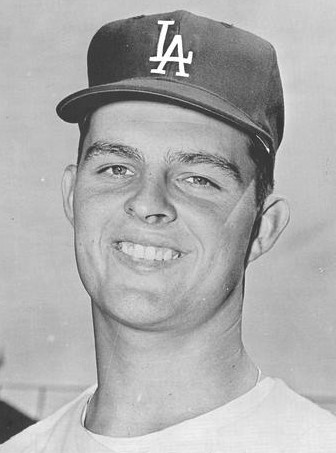
Don Drysdale's then-record 58 scoreless innings streak in 1968 included six consecutive shutouts, a Major League record.

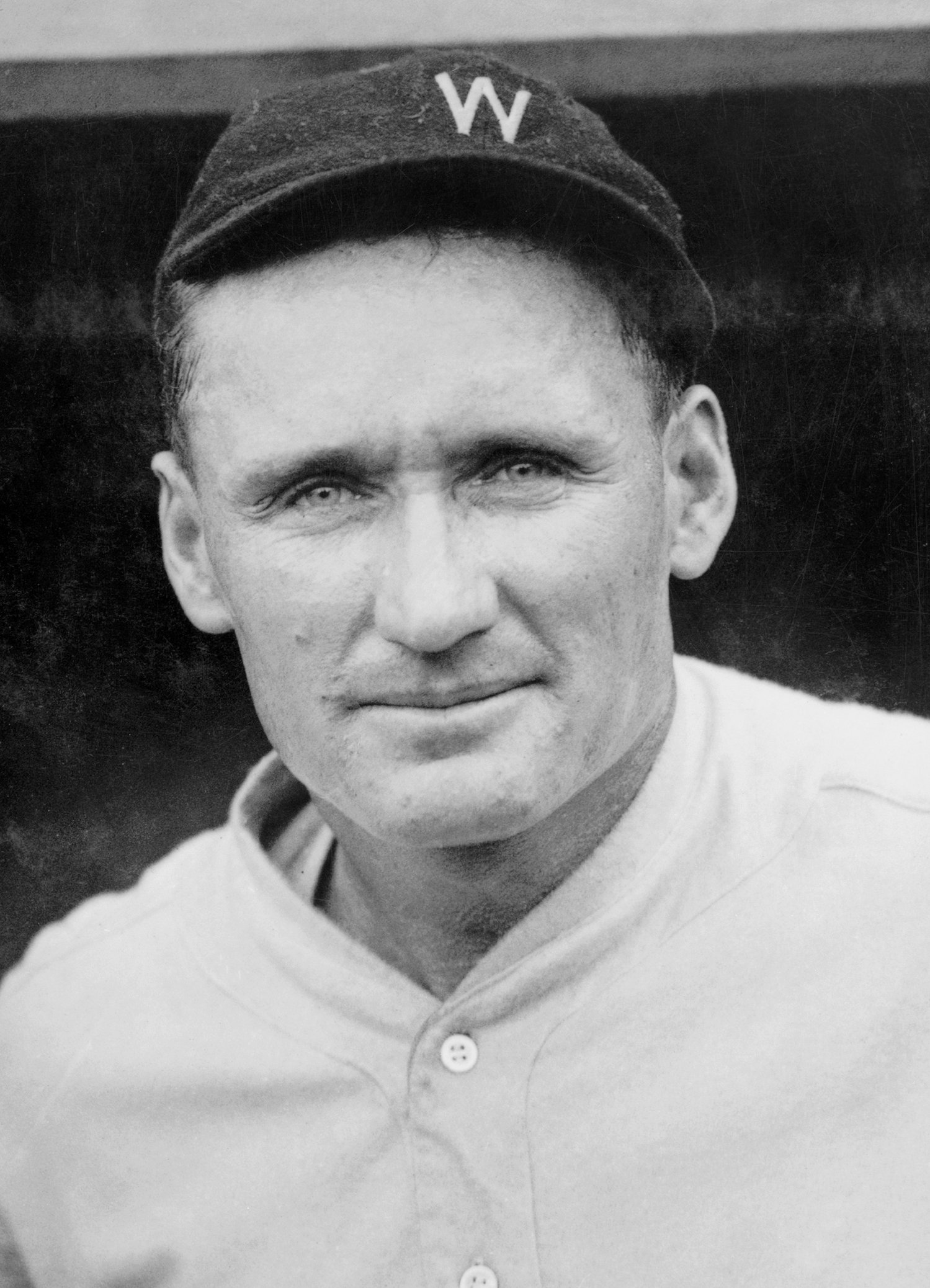
Walter Johnson's 55 consecutive scoreless innings in 1913 was the Major League record for 55 years and remains the American League record.

#	Player	Team	IP	Starting date	Ending date
1	Orel Hershiser	Los Angeles Dodgers	59	August 30, 1988	September 28, 1988
2	Don Drysdale	Los Angeles Dodgers	58	May 14, 1968	June 8, 1968
3	Walter Johnson	Washington Senators	55 2/3	April 10, 1913	May 14, 1913
4	Jack Coombs	Philadelphia Athletics	53	September 5, 1910	September 25, 1910
5	Cristopher Sánchez	Philadelphia Phillies	50 2/3	April 30, 2026	June 3, 2026
6	Bob Gibson	St. Louis Cardinals	47	June 2, 1968	June 26, 1968
7	Zack Greinke	Los Angeles Dodgers	45 2/3	June 18, 2015	July 26, 2015
8	Carl Hubbell	New York Giants	45 1/3	June 13, 1933	August 1, 1933
9	Cy Young	Boston Americans	45	April 25, 1904	May 17, 1904
	Doc White	Chicago White Sox	45	September 12, 1904	September 30, 1904
	Sal Maglie	New York Giants	45	August 16, 1950	September 4, 1950
12	Zac Gallen	Arizona Diamondbacks	44 1/3	August 8, 2022	September 11, 2022
13	Ed Reulbach	Chicago Cubs	44	September 17, 1908	October 3, 1908
14	Rube Waddell	Philadelphia Athletics	43 2/3	August 22, 1905	September 5, 1905
15	Rube Foster	Boston Red Sox	42	May 1, 1914	May 29, 1914
	Brandon Webb	Arizona Diamondbacks	42	July 20, 2007	August 17, 2007
17	Jack Chesbro	Pittsburgh Pirates	41	June 26, 1902	July 16, 1902
	Grover Cleveland Alexander	Philadelphia Phillies	41	September 7, 1911	September 24, 1911
	Art Nehf	Boston Braves	41	September 13, 1917	October 4, 1917
	Ted Lyons	Chicago White Sox	41	August 9, 1926	August 26, 1926
	Luis Tiant	Cleveland Indians	41	April 28, 1968	May 17, 1968
	Clayton Kershaw	Los Angeles Dodgers	41	June 13, 2014	July 10, 2014
23	Walter Johnson	Washington Senators	40	May 7, 1918	May 26, 1918
	Gaylord Perry	San Francisco Giants	40	August 28, 1967	September 10, 1967
	Luis Tiant	Boston Red Sox	40	August 19, 1972	September 8, 1972

=== Postseason ===
The following is a list of pitchers with at least 20 consecutive postseason scoreless innings. Mariano Rivera holds the postseason record, and Whitey Ford holds the World Series record.

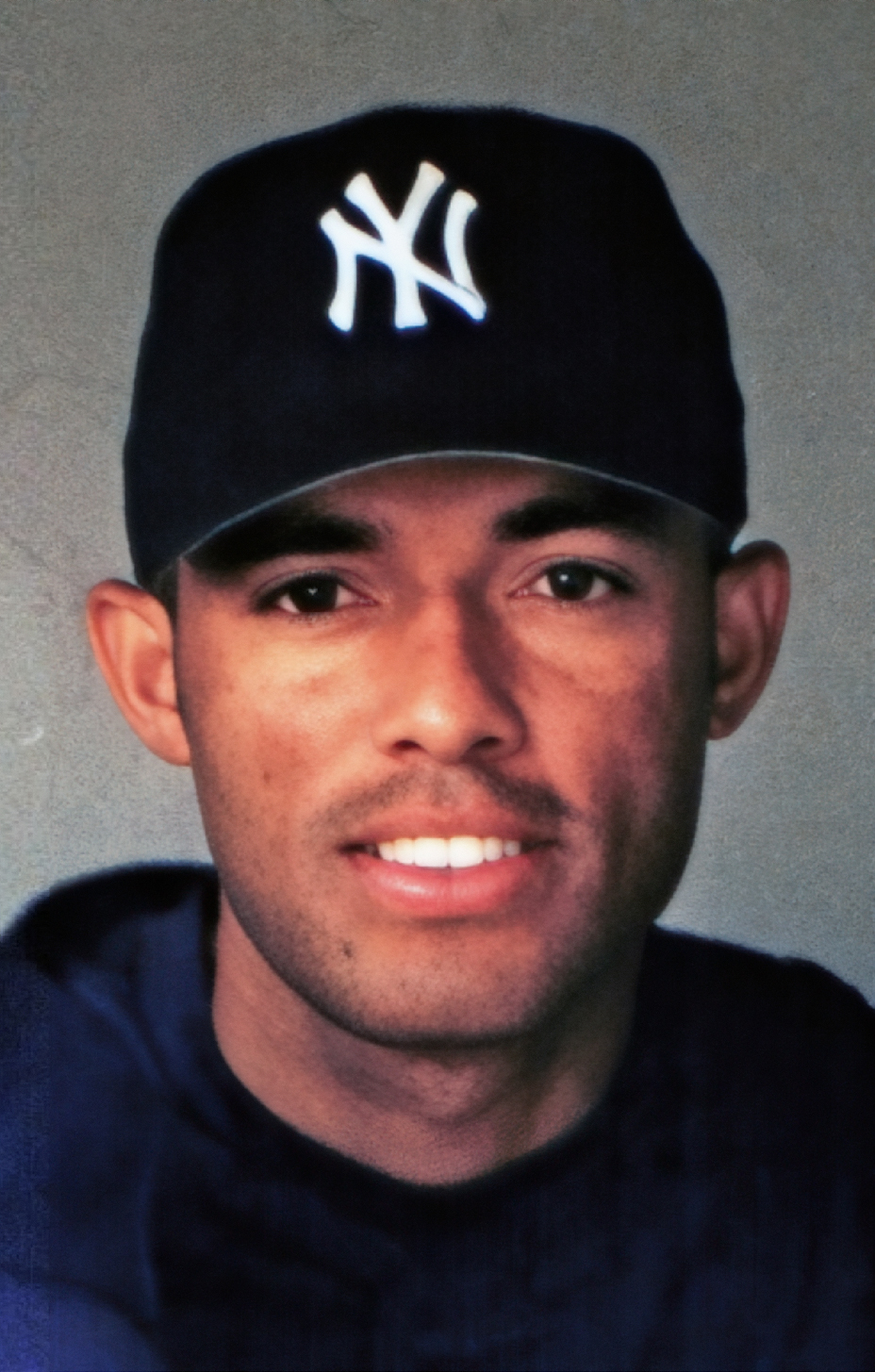
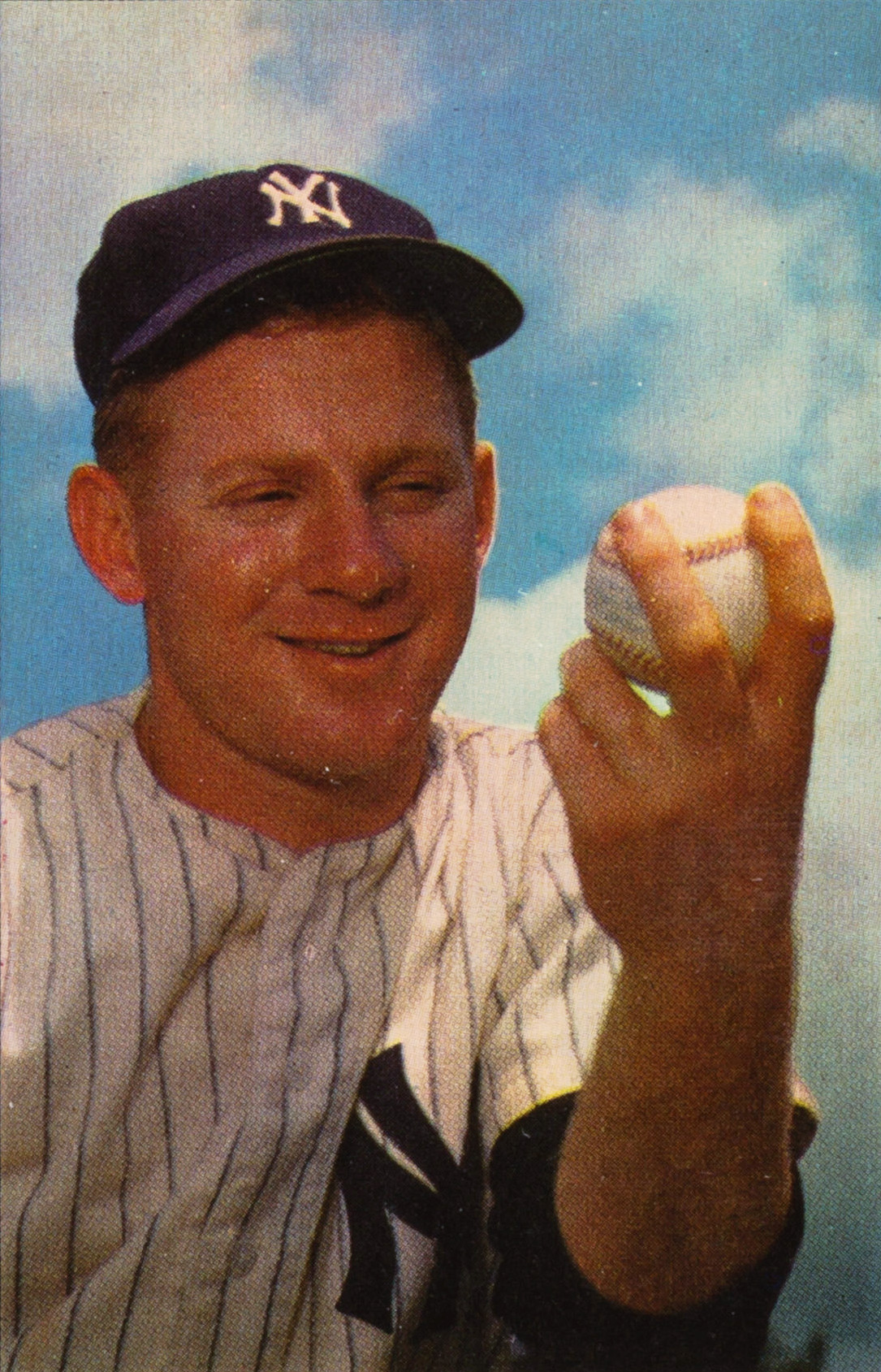
Mariano Rivera (left) holds the postseason record of 33 1/3 consecutive scoreless innings. Whitey Ford (right) holds the World Series record with 33 consecutive scoreless innings.

#	Player	Team(s)	IP	Year(s)	Starting date	Ending date
1	Mariano Rivera	New York Yankees	33 1/3	1998–2000	September 29, 1998	October 13, 2000
2	Whitey Ford	New York Yankees	33	1960–1962	October 8, 1960	October 4, 1962
3	Babe Ruth	Boston Red Sox	29	1916, 1918	October 9, 1916	September 9, 1918
4	Christy Mathewson	New York Giants	28	1905, 1911	October 9, 1905	October 14, 1911
5	Jonathan Papelbon	Boston Red Sox	26	2005, 2007–09	October 5, 2005	October 9, 2009
6	Madison Bumgarner	San Francisco Giants	24	2014, 2016	October 26, 2014	October 10, 2016
7	Jeremy Affeldt	San Francisco Giants	23 1/3	2010, 2012, 2014	October 30, 2010	October 29, 2014
	Andrew Miller	Baltimore Orioles; New York Yankees; Cleveland Indians	23 1/3	2014–2016	October 2, 2014	October 28, 2016
9	Sandy Koufax	Los Angeles Dodgers	22	1965–1966	October 11, 1965	October 6, 1966
10	Ken Dayley	St. Louis Cardinals	20 1/3	1985, 1987	October 9, 1985	October 22, 1987
	Trevor Rosenthal	St. Louis Cardinals	20 1/3	2012–2013	October 8, 2012	October 30, 2013

== See also ==
- Hitting streak
- List of Major League Baseball individual streaks
