= Don Drysdale =

American baseball player and broadcaster (1936–1993)

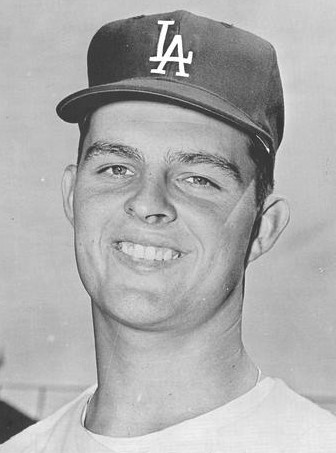
- Drysdale in 1961
- Pitcher
- Born: July 23, 1936; Van Nuys, California, U.S.
- Died: July 3, 1993 (aged 56); Montreal, Quebec, Canada
- Batted: Right Threw: Right

MLB debut
- April 17, 1956, for the Brooklyn Dodgers

Last MLB appearance
- August 5, 1969, for the Los Angeles Dodgers

MLB statistics
- Win–loss record: 209–166
- Earned run average: 2.95
- Strikeouts: 2,486
- Stats at Baseball Reference

Teams
- Brooklyn / Los Angeles Dodgers (1956–1969)

Career highlights and awards
- 9× All-Star (1959, 1959², 1961², 1962, 1963–1965, 1967, 1968); 3× World Series champion (1959, 1963, 1965); Cy Young Award (1962); MLB wins leader (1962); 3× MLB strikeout leader (1959, 1960, 1962); Los Angeles Dodgers No. 53 retired

Member of the National

Baseball Hall of Fame
- Induction: 1984
- Vote: 78.4% (tenth ballot)

Donald Scott Drysdale (July 23, 1936 – July 3, 1993), nicknamed "Big D", was an American professional baseball pitcher and broadcaster who played in Major League Baseball (MLB). He spent his entire 14-year career with the Brooklyn / Los Angeles Dodgers. Known for being a fierce competitor, Drysdale won the Cy Young Award in 1962 and was a three-time World Series champion during his playing career.

Born in Van Nuys, California, Drysdale made his major league debut in 1956. He quickly made a reputation for himself as a brushback pitcher who was not afraid to pitch inside to batters in order to keep them off balance. Often overshadowed by teammate and Dodgers ace Sandy Koufax, Drysdale nevertheless made his own mark, winning the Cy Young Award in 1962 and setting a record six consecutive shutouts and 58 consecutive scoreless innings in 1968.

Drysdale was inducted into the Baseball Hall of Fame in 1984 and, the same year, had his number 53 retired by the Los Angeles Dodgers. After his playing career ended in 1969, Drysdale became a radio and television broadcaster until his sudden death from a heart attack in 1993.

== Early life ==
Drysdale was born in Van Nuys, Los Angeles to Scotty and Verna Drysdale. His father was a repair supervisor for the Pacific Telephone and Telegraph Company who had a brief minor league career before Drysdale was born.

Drysdale attended Van Nuys High School where one of his classmates was actor Robert Redford. While he had played baseball since childhood, primarily as a second baseman, Drysdale only began to pitch during his senior year in high school; he posted a 10–1 record. He was signed out of high school by the Brooklyn Dodgers for a minimum salary and a signing bonus of $4,000.

== Professional career ==
=== Minor leagues ===
Drysdale began his professional career in 1954, playing for the Class-C Bakersfield Indians of the California League where he posted an 8–5 win-loss record with a 3.46 earned run average and 73 strikeouts in Bakersfield.

The next season, Drysdale was promoted to the Triple-A Montreal Royals of the International League. In 1955, he posted an 11–11 record with a 3.33 earned run average and 80 strikeouts for Montreal. The following year, he was promoted to the Brooklyn Dodgers.

=== Brooklyn / Los Angeles Dodgers (1956–1969) ===
Drysdale made his major league debut on April 17, 1956, pitching a scoreless 9th inning in an 8–6 loss against the Philadelphia Phillies. He made his first start on April 23, also against the Phillies, a complete game win in which he allowed only one run and struck out 9 batters. Drysdale finished his rookie season with an 2.64 earned run average and 55 strikeouts in 99 innings pitched.

Drysdale, along with Dodgers teammate Sandy Koufax, served six months in the United States Army Reserve at Fort Dix, New Jersey and Van Nuys, California after the end of the 1957 season and before spring training in 1958. In his autobiography, Once a Bum, Always a Dodger, Drysdale wrote:

Those six months were good for me. When you wake up at three-thirty every morning, and you realize that some of your buddies are just getting in back home, it gives you a lot of discipline. The service should be mandatory for every kid in America. You thought you were hot stuff being a major league pitcher, and then you went to Fort Dix and found out that it doesn't matter who you were. There were no exceptions.

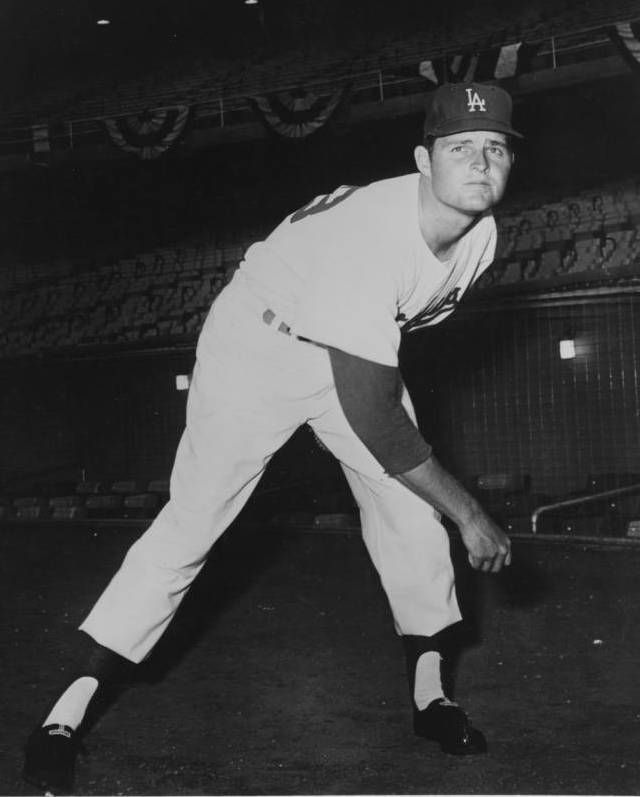
Drysdale at Dodger Stadium in the early 1960s

In 1962, Drysdale won 25 games and led the Majors in strikeouts with 232. He won the Cy Young Award and was named The Sporting News Player of the Year and Pitcher of the Year. In 1963, he struck out 251 batters and won Game 3 of the World Series at Los Angeles's Dodger Stadium over the Yankees, 1–0. In 1965, he was the Dodgers' only .300 hitter and tied his own National League record for pitchers with seven home runs. That year, he also won 23 games and helped the Dodgers to their third pennant in Los Angeles.

In 1965, Koufax declined to pitch the first game of the World Series as it fell on Yom Kippur, the holiest day in the Jewish calendar. Drysdale pitched for the Dodgers instead of Koufax, giving up seven runs in 2 2/3 innings, with the Dodgers losing 8–2 to the Minnesota Twins. When Dodgers manager Walter Alston came to the mound to remove him from the game in the 3rd inning, Drysdale quipped, "Hey, skip, bet you wish I was Jewish today too." Despite the setback, the Dodgers went on to win the Series behind Koufax's MVP-winning performances in Games 5 and 7, with Drysdale winning Game 4 at Dodger Stadium.

Drysdale and Koufax took part in a famous joint holdout in the spring of 1966. They had set an NL record the year before for strikeouts by teammates, with a combined total of 592. Both wanted to be paid $500,000 over three seasons, but Dodgers' GM Buzzie Bavasi preferred to give them one-year contracts according to team policy. They both finally signed one-year contracts just before the season opened. Drysdale's contract was for $110,000, and Koufax's contract was for $125,000. Those contracts made them the first pitchers to earn more than $100,000 a year.

In 1968, the "year of the pitcher", Drysdale set Major League records with six consecutive shutouts and 58 2/3 consecutive scoreless innings, winning NL Player of the Month honors in June and starting the All-Star Game in Houston. The scoreless innings record was broken by fellow Dodgers pitcher Orel Hershiser 20 years later. Hershiser, however, did not match Drysdale's record of six consecutive complete-game shutouts.

Recurring shoulder injuries had slowed Drysdale down in his final years. After suffering a torn rotator cuff, Drysdale retired from Major League Baseball during the 1969 season, having made only 12 starts. At the time of his retirement, he was the last active player on the Dodgers who had played for them in Brooklyn.

== Career overall ==
=== Achievements and honors ===
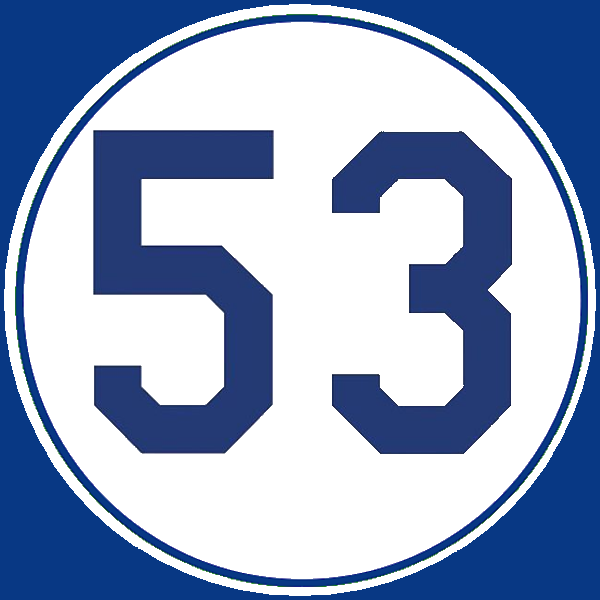
Don Drysdale's number 53 was retired by the Los Angeles Dodgers in 1984.

In his 14-year career, Drysdale compiled a record of 209–166 with an earned run average of 2.95. He struck out 2,486 batters, posted 49 shutouts, and hit 154 batters. He struck out 200 or more batters six times and won 20 games twice. In the World Series, he had a record of 3–3 with a 2.95 ERA. Drysdale led the Majors in strikeouts three times, wins once, and lead the NL in shutouts once. In 1962, with a record of 25-9 and a Major League-leading 232 strikeouts, he won the Cy Young Award.

Additionally, Drysdale won three NL Player of the Month awards: June 1959 (6–0 record, 1.71 earned run average, 51 strikeouts), July 1960 (6–0 record, 2.00 earned run average, 48 strikeouts), and May 1968 (5–1 record, 0.53 earned run average, 45 strikeouts, with 5 consecutive shutouts to begin his scoreless inning streak, which was carried into June).

He was also a good hitting pitcher. In 14 seasons, he had 218 hits in 1,169 at-bats for a lifetime .186 batting average, including 96 runs, 26 doubles, 7 triples, 29 home runs, 113 RBI and 60 bases on balls. His 29 home runs are sixth all-time for pitchers. He was occasionally used as a pinch-hitter, including once during the 1965 World Series. Drysdale hit 7 home runs in a season twice, in 1958 and 1965, and was the only .300 hitter for the offensively-weak Dodgers during the latter season.

Drysdale was inducted into the Baseball Hall of Fame in 1984, his tenth year of eligibility, and his number 53 retired was retired by the Dodgers on July 1, 1984. During his career, he was a nine-time All-Star, starting the Midsummer Classic a record five times and pitching a record 19.1 innings, making an appearance in all nine games he was selected to. During All-Star Game play, Drysdale compiled a record of 2–1, with a 1.40 ERA; he faced 69 batters and struck out 19, both All-Star records.

=== Statistics ===
Category	Years	WAR	W	L	ERA	G	GS	CG	SHO	SV	IP	H	R	ER	HR	BB	IBB	SO	HBP	ERA+	FIP	WHIP	H9	SO9	Ref.
Total	14	61.4	209	166	2.95	518	465	167	49	6	3,432	3,084	1,292	1,124	280	855	123	2,486	154	121	3.02	1.148	8.1	6.5	

=== Pitching style ===
Standing at 6 ft 5 in (1.96 m), Drysdale was known to use brushback pitches and a sidearm fastball to intimidate batters. He gained a reputation for intimidation similar to his fellow Hall of Famer and contemporary Bob Gibson. Sal Maglie, also known for brushback pitches, taught him how to pitch aggressively when they were Dodger teammates in the 1950s. Drysdale led the NL in hit batsmen for four straight seasons from 1958 to 1961, and again in 1965. His 154 career hit batsmen is a modern National League record.

Fellow Hall of Famer Frank Robinson said of him, "He was mean enough to do it, and he did it continuously. You could count on him doing it. And when he did it, he just stood there on the mound and glared at you to let you know he meant it." Of his former teammate, Maglie said: "I don't think Don has ever tried intentionally to send someone to the hospital. A pitcher needs to pitch inside. And if one of your teammates goes down, you do what you have to do to even the score, plain and simple."

== Broadcasting career ==
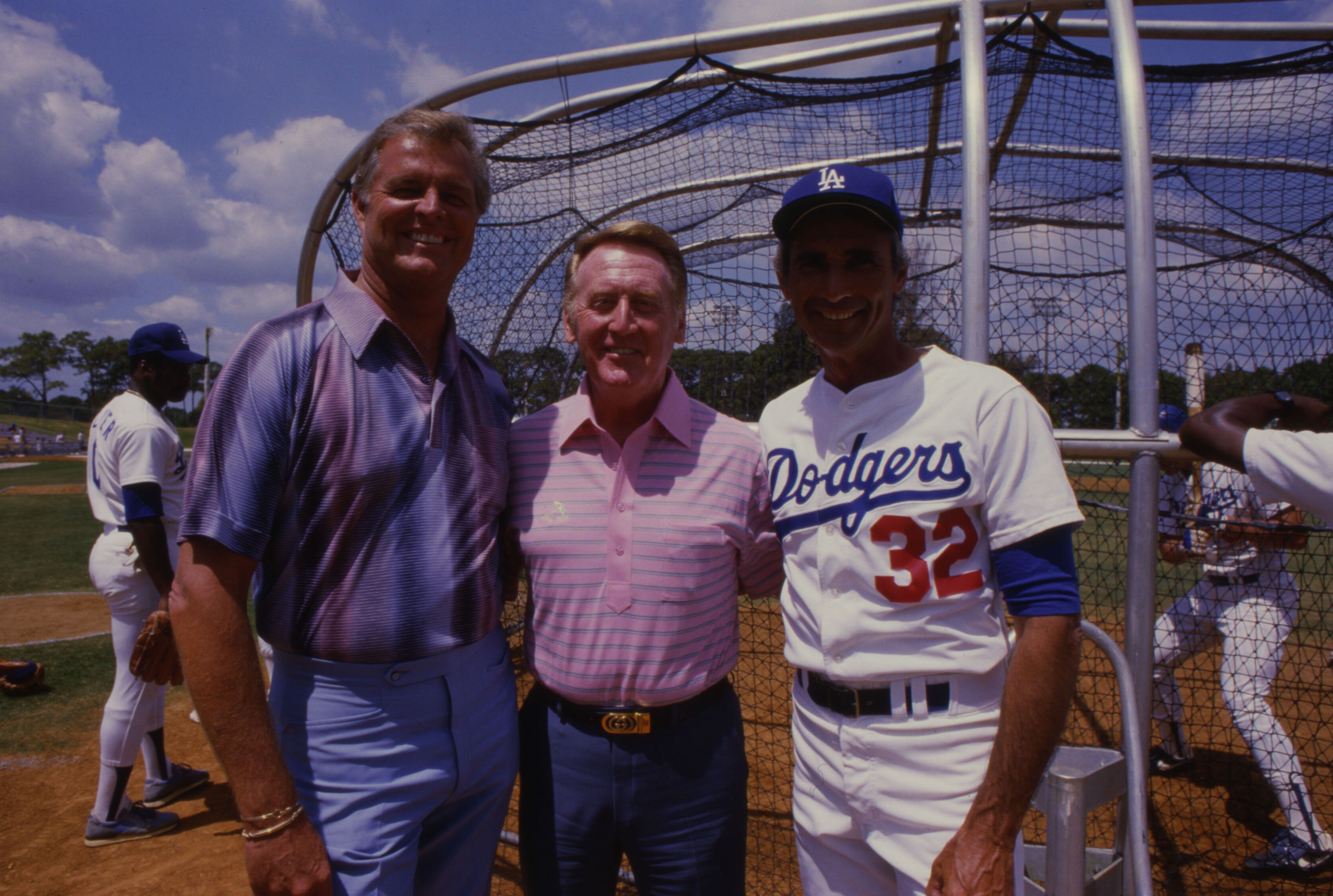
Drysdale (left), with Dodgers announcer Vin Scully and former teammate Sandy Koufax, during spring training 1985

In 1970, Drysdale started a career in sports broadcasting that continued for the rest of his life: first for the Montreal Expos (1970–1971), then the Texas Rangers (1972), California Angels (1973–1979, 1981), Chicago White Sox (1982–1987), NBC (1977), ABC (1978–1986), and finally back in Los Angeles with the Dodgers (1988–1993). Additionally, he also worked with his Angels' partner Dick Enberg on Los Angeles Rams football broadcasts from 1973 to 1976. Drysdale kept the fans' interest with stories of his playing days.

While at ABC Sports, Drysdale not only did baseball telecasts, but also regional college football games as well as Superstars and Wide World of Sports. After the 1979 World Series, Drysdale covered the World Series Trophy presentation ceremonies for ABC. On October 11, 1980, Keith Jackson called an Oklahoma–Texas college football game for ABC in the afternoon, then flew to Houston to call Game 4 of the NLCS between the Houston Astros and Philadelphia Phillies. In the meantime, Drysdale filled in for Jackson on play-by-play for the early innings.

In 1979, Drysdale was involved in a couple of heated confrontations on the California Angels team plane with Angels manager Jim Fregosi and Angels pitcher Jim Barr. Drysdale questioned the legitimacy of an injury Barr had suffered that was preventing him from pitching in the playoffs. After he and Barr went at it, Fregosi stepped in to defend his player. Drysdale apologized the next day.

In 1984, Drysdale called play-by-play with analysts Reggie Jackson and Earl Weaver for the National League Championship Series between the San Diego Padres and Chicago Cubs. On October 6, 1984, at San Diego's Jack Murphy Stadium, Game 4 of the NLCS ended when Padres first baseman Steve Garvey hit a now-iconic walk-off home run off Cubs relief pitcher Lee Smith, forcing a decisive Game 5. Drysdale on the call:

Deep right field, way back. Cotto going back to the wall... It's gone! Home run Garvey! And there will be tomorrow!

In his last ABC assignment, Drysdale interviewed the winners in the Boston Red Sox clubhouse following Game 7 of the 1986 American League Championship Series against the California Angels.

In 1985, for the Chicago White Sox, Drysdale broadcast Tom Seaver's 300th victory, against the host New York Yankees in 1985. His post-game interview with Seaver was carried live by both the Sox' network and the Yankees' longtime flagship television station WPIX.

On September 28, 1988, fellow Dodger Orel Hershiser surpassed Drysdale when Hershiser finished the season with a record 59 consecutive scoreless innings pitched. In his final start of the year, Hershiser needed to pitch 10 shutout innings to set the mark – meaning not only that he would have to prevent the San Diego Padres from scoring, but that his own team would also need to fail to score in order to ensure extra innings; against all odds, Hershiser pitched 10 innings of a scoreless tie, with the Padres eventually prevailing 2–1 in 16 innings, breaking Drysdale's record. Afterwards, Drysdale came onto the field to congratulate him, remarking, "Oh, I'll tell ya, congratulations... And at least you kept it in the family."

Drysdale also called Kirk Gibson's famous walk-off home run in Game 1 of the 1988 World Series for the Dodgers Radio Network:

Gibson a deep sigh, re-gripping the bat, shoulders just shrugged, now goes to the top of the helmet as he always does, steps in with that left foot. Eckersley working out of a stretch, now here's the 3-2 pitch...and a drive into right field (losing voice) WAY BACK! THIS BALL IS GONE! – *two minutes of crowd cheering* – This crowd will not stop! They can't believe the ending! And this time, Mighty Casey did NOT strike out!!

=== Radio show ===
In 1987, Drysdale hosted a nationally syndicated radio show called Radio Baseball Cards. 162 episodes were produced with stories and anecdotes told by current and former Major League Baseball players. The highlight of the series were numerous episodes dedicated to the memory and impact of Jackie Robinson as told by teammates, opponents and admirers. Radio Baseball Cards aired on 38 stations, including WNBC New York, KSFO San Francisco and WEEI Boston, as a pre-game show. A collector's edition of the program was re-released in 2007 as a podcast.

== Personal life ==
In 1958, Drysdale married Eula "Ginger" Dubberly, a native of Covington, Georgia, and a former Adrian fashion model. The couple had a daughter named Kelly Jean (b. 1959), but divorced in 1982.

In 1986, he married basketball player Ann Meyers, who took the name Ann Meyers-Drysdale. Drysdale and Meyers had three children together: two sons, Donald Scott Jr. (known as "DJ"; b. 1987, on his father's 51st birthday) and Darren John (b. 1989), and a daughter, Drew Ann (b. 1993). When Ann was elected to the Basketball Hall of Fame in 1993, it was the first time that a married couple were members of their respective sports' Halls of Fame.

== Death ==
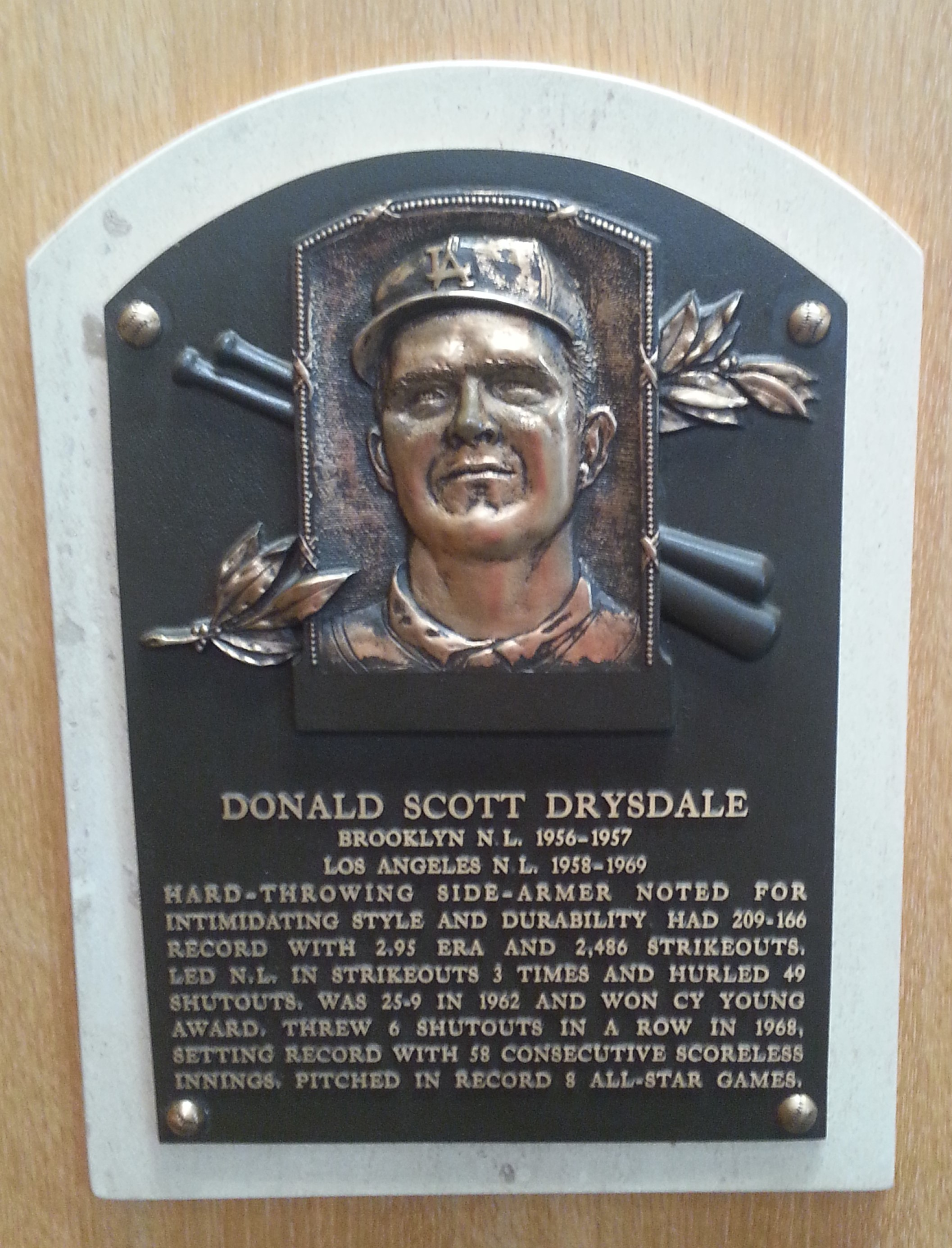
Don Drysdale's plaque at the Baseball Hall of Fame

On July 2, 1993, Drysdale worked the television broadcast for the game between the Dodgers and the Montreal Expos at Olympic Stadium. After the game, he returned to his room at the hotel the team was staying at, Le Centre Sheraton. As the team left for the stadium the next morning, Drysdale was not with them. Several broadcast team members were sent back to the hotel once the team realized Drysdale had not arrived at the stadium, and when hotel personnel went up to Drysdale's room they discovered his body lying face down on the floor. The cause of death was ruled to be a heart attack, and the coroner's report determined that Drysdale had been dead for at least eighteen hours by the time he was found.

The Dodgers noted the death of their former star pitcher during the broadcast of the game later on that day. Drysdale's broadcasting colleague Vin Scully, who was instructed not to say anything on the air until Drysdale's family was notified, announced the news of his death by saying, "Never have I been asked to make an announcement that hurts me as much as this one. And I say it to you as best I can with a broken heart." He later described it "the toughest broadcast" of his career.

While this was going on, word reached Drysdale's former White Sox colleague Ken Harrelson as he was calling that evening's game against the Baltimore Orioles at Comiskey Park for WGN television. Harrelson relayed the information to his audience, barely able to keep his composure while doing so. Dick Enberg, his broadcast partner with the Angels, said, "Every day was a good day when you were with Don Drysdale." Sandy Koufax, his former teammate, said of Drysdale's sudden death: "Don is one of those people you didn't think anything could ever happen to. This is a very hard thing to deal with."

Among the personal belongings found in Drysdale's hotel room was a cassette tape of Robert F. Kennedy's victory speech after the 1968 California Democratic presidential primary, a speech given only moments before Senator Kennedy's assassination. In the speech, Kennedy had noted, to the cheers of the crowd, that Drysdale had pitched his sixth straight shutout that evening. Drysdale had apparently carried the tape with him wherever he went since Kennedy's assassination.

Drysdale's funeral was held in Hall of the Crucifixion-Resurrection in Glendale, California. The ceremony was conducted by John Werhas, Drysdale's former teammate who had become a pastor in retirement. Vin Scully, Tommy Lasorda, Bob Uecker, and Orel Hershiser gave eulogies. Drysdale's body was cremated and his ashes were placed in the Utility Columbarium in the Great Mausoleum at Forest Lawn Memorial Park in Glendale, California. They were returned to his family in February 2002 and scattered the next year.

== Television appearances ==
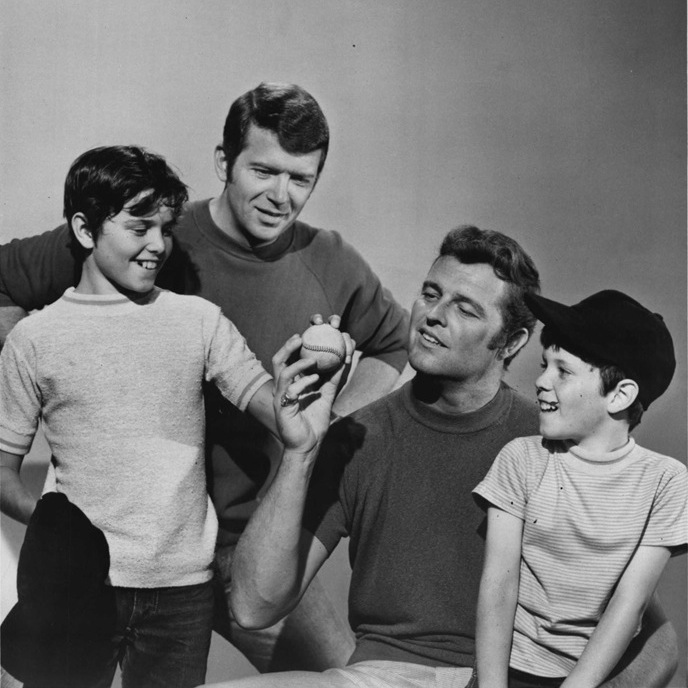
Drysdale appearing as a guest star on The Brady Bunch, 1970

Drysdale was a popular guest star in several television programs:

- In 1959, with his first wife, Ginger, he appeared on You Bet Your Life with host Groucho Marx.
- In 1959, Drysdale appeared as a mystery challenger on the TV panel show To Tell the Truth.
- In 1960, Drysdale appeared in an episode of Lawman.
- The Rifleman episode "Skull", which was first broadcast on January 1, 1962.
- Leave It to Beaver episode "Long Distance Call", which was first broadcast on June 16, 1962.
- The Donna Reed Show episodes "The Man in the Mask", first broadcast in 1962; "All Those Dreams", first broadcast in 1963; and "Play Ball" and "My Son the Catcher", both first broadcast in 1964. In all four episodes Drysdale plays himself, and in "All Those Dreams" he appeared with first wife, Ginger, and daughter Kelly.
- On the April 10, 1963, episode of The Beverly Hillbillies, "The Clampetts & The Dodgers", Drysdale and Leo Durocher play golf with Jed and Jethro, and Durocher finds out that Jed and Jethro are good baseball prospects.
- Our Man Higgins episode "Who's on First?" (May 8, 1963).
- On the March 21, 1964, episode of The Joey Bishop Show, "Joey and the L.A. Dodgers", Bishop guests are several members of the 1963 World Series Champions Los Angeles Dodgers. The teammates show off their various talents, the highlight being Drysdale, a natural singer, crooning "I Left My Heart In San Francisco".
- The Flying Nun episode "The Big Game" as the baseball game umpire, 1st episode of the 3rd season, aired September 17, 1969.
- The Brady Bunch episode "The Dropout", which was first broadcast on September 25, 1970.
- The Greatest American Hero episode "The Two Hundred Mile an Hour Fastball", which was first broadcast on November 4, 1981, as a broadcaster for the California Stars.

== See also ==
- Major League Baseball titles leaders
- List of Major League Baseball all-time leaders in home runs by pitchers
- List of Major League Baseball annual strikeout leaders
- List of Major League Baseball annual wins leaders
- List of Major League Baseball career wins leaders
- List of Major League Baseball career hit batsmen leaders
- List of Major League Baseball career strikeout leaders
- List of Major League Baseball individual streaks
- List of Major League Baseball single-inning strikeout leaders
- List of Major League Baseball players who spent their entire career with one franchise

Awards and achievements
Preceded by Don Newcombe; Johnny Podres; Sandy Koufax; Claude Osteen	Los Angeles Dodgers Opening Day; Starting pitcher 1958–1961; 1963; 1965; 1969	Succeeded by Johnny Podres; Sandy Koufax; Claude Osteen; Claude Osteen
Preceded by Roy Face; Lindy McDaniel; Orlando Cepeda	Major League Player of the Month; July 1959; July 1960; May 1968	Succeeded by Vern Law & Willie McCovey; Warren Spahn; Bob Gibson
Media offices
Preceded by Howard Cosell	#1 color commentator, Major League Baseball on ABC; 1978-1982	Succeeded by Earl Weaver
Preceded by Al Michaels	#2 play-by-play announcer, Major League Baseball on ABC; 1983-1985	Succeeded by Keith Jackson
