= Orel Hershiser =

American baseball player and analyst (born 1958)

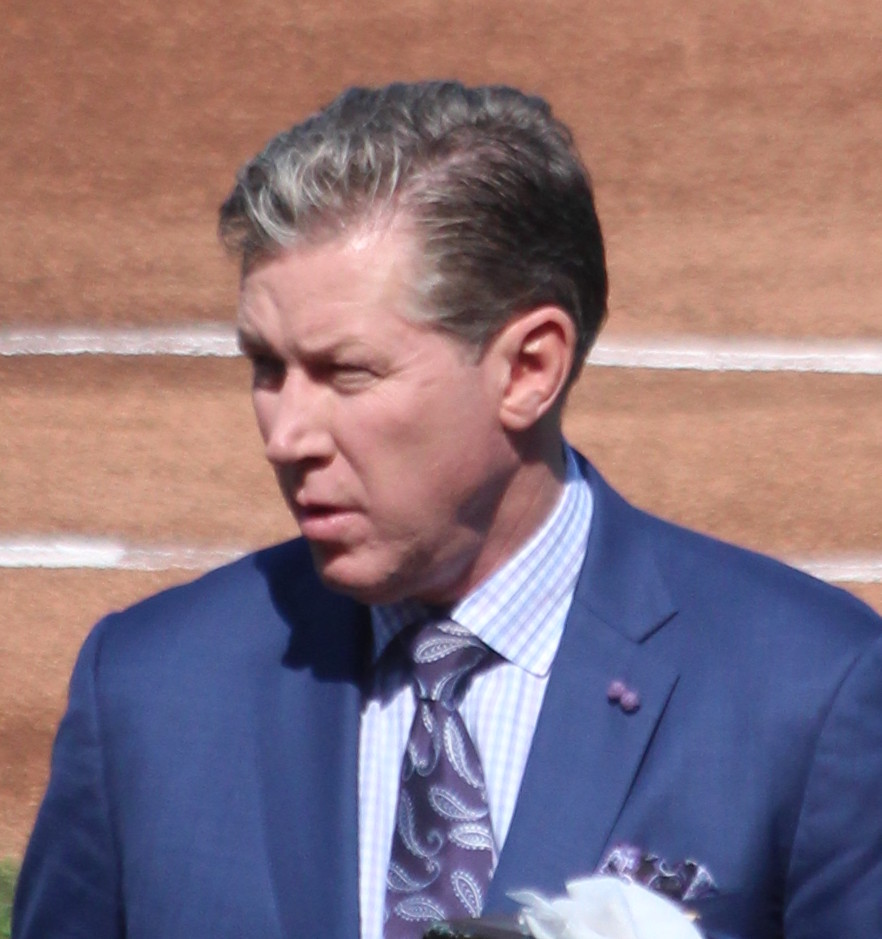
- Hershiser in 2014
- Pitcher
- Born: September 16, 1958 (age 68); Buffalo, New York, U.S.
- Batted: Right Threw: Right

MLB debut
- September 1, 1983, for the Los Angeles Dodgers

Last MLB appearance
- June 26, 2000, for the Los Angeles Dodgers

MLB statistics
- Win–loss record: 204–150
- Earned run average: 3.48
- Strikeouts: 2,014
- Stats at Baseball Reference

Teams
- As player: Los Angeles Dodgers (1983–1994); Cleveland Indians (1995–1997); San Francisco Giants (1998); New York Mets (1999); Los Angeles Dodgers (2000); As coach: Texas Rangers (2002–2005)

Career highlights and awards
- 3× All-Star (1987–1989); World Series champion (1988); NL Cy Young Award (1988); World Series MVP (1988); 2× LCS MVP (1988, 1995); Gold Glove Award (1988); Silver Slugger Award (1993); NL wins leader (1988); MLB record 59 consecutive scoreless innings pitched; Legend of Dodger Baseball

Orel Leonard Hershiser IV (born September 16, 1958), nicknamed the "Bulldog", is an American former professional baseball pitcher who played 18 seasons in Major League Baseball (MLB) from 1983 to 2000. He later became a pitching coach for the Texas Rangers from 2002 to 2005 and a broadcast color analyst for the Dodgers. He is also a professional poker player.

After playing baseball in high school at Cherry Hill High School East and at Bowling Green State University, Hershiser was drafted by the Los Angeles Dodgers in 1979. After several years in the minor leagues, he made his major league debut with the Dodgers in 1983. During his tenure with the team, Hershiser was a three-time All-Star, finishing in the top five in Cy Young voting four times in his first six full seasons. Hershiser's most successful season came in 1988, when he set a major league record by pitching 59 consecutive innings without allowing a run. He helped lead the Dodgers to a championship in the 1988 World Series, and was named the National League (NL) Championship Series Most Valuable Player (MVP) and the World Series MVP. That season, he won the NL Cy Young Award and an NL Gold Glove Award. He later pitched in two more World Series and earned the American League Championship Series MVP Award. After 12 seasons with the Dodgers, Hershiser spent time with the Cleveland Indians, San Francisco Giants, and New York Mets before returning to Los Angeles for his final season. After retirement as a player, he briefly worked as a coach and team executive for the Texas Rangers before serving as a color analyst for ESPN and then the Dodgers on SportsNet LA.

== Early life ==
Hershiser was born in Buffalo, New York, to Orel Leonard III and Mildred Hershiser. The family moved to Detroit, Michigan, when he was six and to Toronto, Ontario, when he was 12. At age eight, Hershiser was the third-place finisher in a national hit, run, and throw competition. Hershiser played in Little League Baseball until he was 12. His father was a coach and league administrator and his mother ran the snack bar. During his family's time in Canada, he participated in ice hockey with the Don Mills Flyers in the Greater Toronto Hockey League.

His family moved again and he attended Cherry Hill High School East in Cherry Hill, New Jersey. He did not make the varsity team until his junior year as he spent his first year on the freshman team and his second year on the junior varsity. He set the single-game strikeout record for his high school in 1976 when he retired 15 batters in a game against Deptford, a record that stood for 21 years. He also remains on the school's leaderboards in career winning percentage, strikeouts and earned run average (ERA). He was an all-conference selection his senior year.

== College career ==
Hershiser received only a partial scholarship from Bowling Green State University. As a freshman he played little baseball and was academically ineligible as a sophomore. He left school and hitchhiked home, where his parents convinced him to return to school. He enrolled in summer school to bring his grades up and worked at his father's paper company during the summer. He grew and gained 15 pounds (6.8 kg) that summer, which added 5 miles per hour (8.0 km/h) to his fastball and got him more playing time. He made the all-Mid-American Conference All-Star team his junior year, during which he pitched a no-hitter against Kent State on May 4, 1979. He won that game 2–0 despite only striking out two batters. In his only full-time season with the baseball team, in 1979, he was 6–2 with a 2.26 ERA.

Hershiser was also a member of the Sigma Phi Epsilon fraternity. One of his fraternity brothers played a joke on him on draft day, pretending to be a scout from the San Diego Padres calling to tell him he was drafted in the first round. After getting excited and starting to call his friends, he realized it was a hoax.

== Professional career ==
=== Draft and minor leagues ===
The Los Angeles Dodgers selected Hershiser in the 17th round of the 1979 Major League Baseball draft. The original scouting report on him for the draft said that he had poor control, a weak fastball, and threw the curveball incorrectly. It went on to state that he rattled easily and had questionable makeup.

The Dodgers assigned him to their Class A farm team in the Midwest League, the Clinton Dodgers. He started four games for Clinton in 1979, and appeared in 11 more out of the bullpen to finish with a 4–0 record with a 2.09 ERA.

Hershiser spent the next two seasons in AA with the San Antonio Dodgers of the Texas League. He worked primarily as a reliever at San Antonio. He was leading the league in saves at one point but then gave up 20 runs in seven innings on a road trip. He called this point the lowest of his career. He wanted to quit but the manager and pitching coach talked him out of it.

Hershiser was promoted to the Triple-A Albuquerque Dukes of the Pacific Coast League in 1982. He was 9–6 with a 3.71 ERA in 47 games, with seven starts. He was almost included in a trade with the Texas Rangers that season, but catcher Jim Sundberg wanted his contract re-written before agreeing to the deal and the Dodgers backed out of the transaction.

Hershiser won the Mulvey Award as the Dodgers top rookie in spring training in 1983 and expected to make the club but was sent back to Albuquerque where he was briefly reunited with pitching coach Rocky Giordani. He was 10–8 with a 4.09 ERA for the Dukes in 1983 in 49 games, with 10 starts and 16 saves.

=== MLB career ===
==== Early years (1983–1987) ====
The Dodgers promoted Hershiser to the major leagues for the first time on September 1, 1983. He made his debut the same day, against the Montreal Expos. He came into the game in the seventh inning and retired all three batters he faced on two ground outs and a strikeout (of Tim Wallach). However, in his second inning of work he allowed a double and a single for a run and was promptly taken out of the game. In eight appearances that month, he had an ERA of 3.38.

Hershiser played winter ball in the Dominican Republic after the season and worked with pitching coach Dave Wallace on his delivery. He was almost arrested when some fireworks his friends were setting off for a New Year's party hit a Dominican General's house, but Dodger coach Manny Mota intervened on his behalf.

Hershiser made the Dodgers Opening Day roster for the 1984 season as the last man in the bullpen and was mostly used as a long reliever early on. His first win was in a 12-inning game against the St. Louis Cardinals on April 5. After getting pounded in one game, he received such a loud, verbal lashing from Dodger manager Tommy Lasorda that his teammates took to calling it the "sermon on the mound". Lasorda told Hershiser that he was too timid on the mound, giving hitters too much respect. He gave him the nickname "Bulldog" so that he would have a tougher attitude in games.

Hershiser made his first start on May 26 against the New York Mets because of an injury to Jerry Reuss. He pitched six innings and allowed only one run. He became a full-fledged starter in the Dodger rotation in July and responded by pitching four complete game shutouts that month, which was good enough to tie for the most in the NL that season (with Joaquín Andújar and teammate Alejandro Peña). He finished the season with a record of 11–8 and a 2.66 ERA in 45 games (20 starts).

In the 1985 season, Hershiser led the National League (NL) in winning percentage, compiling a 19–3 record with a 2.03 ERA. The Dodgers won the NL West, and Hershiser finished third in Cy Young Award voting. He also saw his first postseason action, pitching in two games in the 1985 National League Championship Series. In the 1986 season, Hershiser went 14–14 with a 3.85 ERA. The next season, he was selected to his first All-Star Game while compiling a 16–16 record with a 3.06 ERA.

==== Cy Young, scoreless streak, and World Series (1988) ====
Hershiser started to feel sick playing golf a week before pitchers and catchers reported, and it was discovered he needed an emergency appendectomy. The Dodgers planned to hold him back in spring training, but instead let him go through it normally after he was fine during workouts on day one.

Hershiser in 1988 led the league in wins (23), innings (267), shutouts (8) and complete games (15). He was third in ERA at 2.26. He finished the season with a record 59 consecutive scoreless innings pitched, breaking the mark of 58 2/3 innings, held by former Dodger Don Drysdale. The streak began on August 30, when he pitched four scoreless innings to conclude a game and the record was broken when he pitched 10 shutout innings, on 116 pitches, in the final game of the season. He was selected to his second all-star game and was a unanimous selection for the National League Cy Young Award. He also won the Gold Glove Award for the best fielding pitcher in the National League.

In the 1988 National League Championship Series between Hershiser's Dodgers and the New York Mets, Hershiser not only started Games 1 and 3, but recorded the final out in Game 4 in relief for a save. He then pitched a complete-game shutout in Game 7 and was selected as the NLCS MVP. He then pitched a shutout in Game 2 of the World Series (a game which he also had three hits himself) and allowed only two runs in a complete game in the clinching victory in Game 5, winning the World Series MVP Award.

Hershiser is the only player to receive the Cy Young Award, the Championship Series MVP Award, and the World Series MVP Award in the same season. He later received both The Sporting News Pitcher of the Year and Sports Illustrated magazine's Sportsman of the Year award, and was also named the Associated Press Athlete of the Year for his accomplishments in 1988.

==== Final years with Dodgers (1989–1994) ====
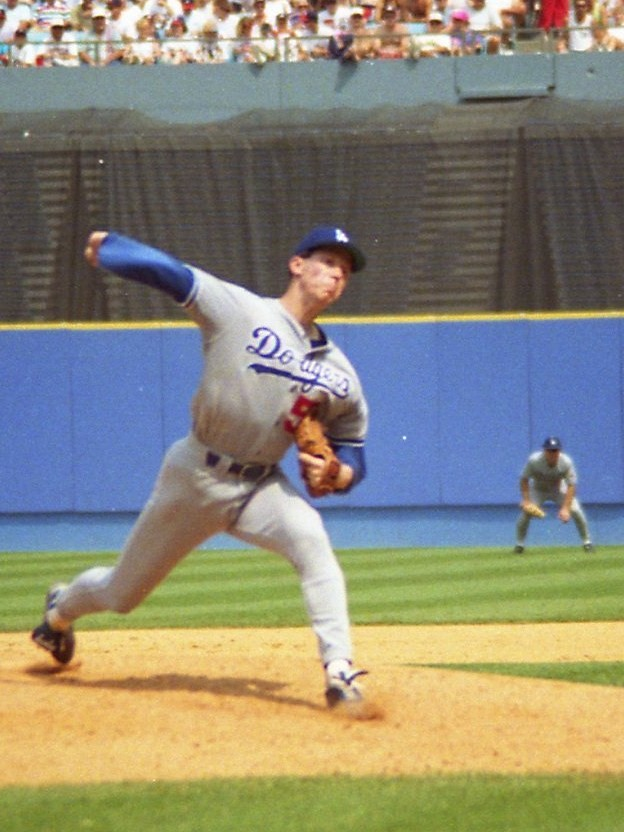
Hershiser with Dodgers in 1993

Hershiser signed a new $7.9 million three-year contract with the Dodgers prior to the 1989 season that was the richest three-year contract ever signed to that point.

That season, he made his third straight All-Star team and he had another good year with an ERA of 2.31 in 35 games. However, the Dodgers weren't as good and he suffered from a lack of offensive support. He went 0–7 over one nine-game stretch because the team only scored nine runs total in that period. He had a 15–15 record that season but only evened it out because he pitched 11 innings in the last game of the season and threw 169 pitches. He was determined to stay in until his team took the lead, no matter what the manager wanted.

After just four starts in 1990, it was discovered that Hershiser had a torn labrum in the shoulder of his pitching arm. Dr. Frank Jobe performed shoulder reconstruction surgery on Hershiser on April 27, 1990, the first time the procedure had been performed on a major league player. He did not rejoin the Dodgers until May 29, 1991, a return that he called "a miracle." Two games later, he picked up his 100th career win against the Chicago Cubs on June 9, 1991. In 21 starts, he was 7–2 with a 3.46 ERA. He won his last six decisions and was selected as the UPI Comeback Player of the Year.

There were still questions about his recovery heading into 1992, but he managed to pitch 33 games in both 1992 and 1993. His numbers were not what they were before the surgery, but he was still effective. He was 10–15 with a 3.67 ERA in 1992 and 12–14 with a 3.59 ERA in 1993. Notably in 1993, Hershiser hit .356 in 83 plate appearances, earning a Silver Slugger Award.

In his final start of 1994, on August 7, Hershiser took a no-hit bid into the sixth inning before it was broken up. The 1994–95 Major League Baseball strike ended the season on August 11. Hershiser was involved in the negotiations as part of the Major League Baseball Players Association but the strike signaled the end of his time with the Dodgers and he became a free agent.

==== Cleveland Indians (1995–1997) ====
Hershiser signed a three-year contract with the Cleveland Indians on April 8, 1995. Indians General Manager John Hart said that the team was looking for a veteran with "character and competitiveness" to show the young players how to play the right way. He went 16–6 with a 3.87 ERA in 26 starts for the Indians in 1995 to lead the young team to their first post-season appearance in 41 years.

Hershiser won the two games he pitched in the 1995 American League Championship Series (ALCS) against the Seattle Mariners and was selected as the ALCS MVP, the first player to have won the LCS MVP Award in both leagues. He also pitched effectively in the 1995 World Series against the Atlanta Braves, though the Indians would lose the series in six games.

He pitched two more seasons for the Indians, and was 14–6 for the 1997 team, including pitching seven shutout innings in Game 3 of the 1997 ALCS. After the game, Orioles manager Davey Johnson accused him of putting water on the back of his neck in order to modify the ball to sink. When asked about it, teammate Chad Ogea stated, "I've been around Orel three years. He cheats. But everyone else does, too. He showed me how to cheat. But he said I couldn't use it until I was about 35. So if I stay around that long, I get the privilege to cheat." In his final World Series appearance in 1997 he gave up 13 runs in 10 innings and lost 2 games to the Florida Marlins.

Though he pitched for the Indians for only three seasons, Hershiser became something of a folk hero in Cleveland. One memorable image from his tenure is of Hershiser screaming "Take that!" at the Braves dugout after starting a 1–3 double play late in game five of the 1995 World Series.

==== Later career (1998–2000) ====
Hershiser signed a one-year $3.45 million contract with the San Francisco Giants on December 7, 1997, but his age was beginning to catch up to him. He made 34 starts and was 11–10 with a 4.41 ERA in 1998. The contract contained an option for 1999 but the Giants declined the option after the season. At the time they said they might come to terms on a new deal. Instead he signed a minor league contract with the Indians on February 20, 1999.

The Indians released him during spring training and he signed with the New York Mets on March 25, 1999. Hershiser made 32 starts with the Mets and was 13–12 with a 4.58 ERA. He served as a mentor to the young pitchers on the Mets staff and helped them make the playoffs by allowing just one run in 5 1/3 innings in a 2–1 win over the Pittsburgh Pirates in the last game of the season. He pitched out of the bullpen in the playoffs as the Mets lost to the Braves in the 1999 National League Championship Series.

Hershiser signed a one-year contract to return to the Dodgers on December 17, 1999. He started the home opener on April 14, 2000, against the Reds and allowed only one run in six strong innings. He struggled after that, allowing 36 runs on 42 hits, 14 walks and 11 hit batters. His 13.14 ERA in 2000 is the worst ERA by any pitcher with 20 or more innings. One day after allowing eight runs in 1 2/3 innings on June 26, he was released by the Dodgers.

== Pitching style ==
Hershiser was not an overpowering pitcher, but he developed a variety of pitches and outthought hitters. Hershiser explained his pitch repertoire in 1989 as follows:

I have a sinking fastball to either side of the plate, a cutter (which changes the direction of my fastball so it breaks instead of sinking) to either side of the plate, a curveball I throw at three speeds and three angles, a straight change—using the same arm speed and position as a fastball but with a grip and a release that slows it dramatically, and changeups to different locations that I throw off my sinker which look like batting practice fastballs. Different locations, different speeds, and slightly different arm angles on all those pitches give me a wide palette of choices.

By 1999, he noted that his pitches were not as sharp, so he added a slider to the mix. He also emphasized locating his pitches in good spots: "You'll hear pitchers say, 'I had great stuff and got shelled,' but you never hear them say, 'I had great location and got shelled.'"

Hershiser was also a good hitter for a pitcher. In 1993 he batted .356 (26 for 73), which is the MLB record for highest batting average for a pitcher in a season in the DH era (minimum 50 at bats). His career batting average was .201.

== Post-retirement ==
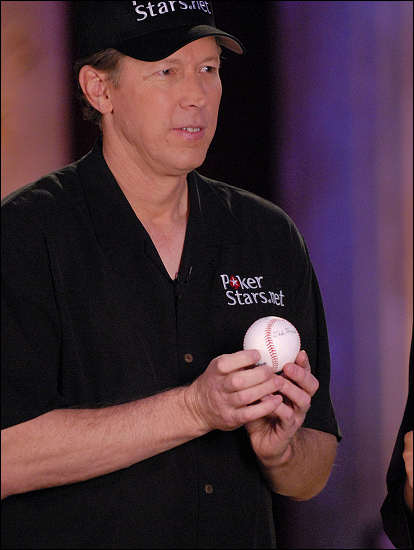
Hershiser at the NBC Heads-Up Poker championships in 2008

Hershiser remained with the Dodgers briefly as a player-personnel consultant. He went to AAA Albuquerque and filed one report but there wasn't much for him to do, so he left the position.

He was subsequently hired to work on broadcasts of the Little League World Series for ABC and ESPN in 2000–2001. He also worked on Wednesday Night Baseball for ESPN during the 2001 season.

Hershiser left that position to join the Texas Rangers as a special assistant to General Manager John Hart in fall of 2001 and was named as the Rangers pitching coach on June 22, 2002. In October 2005 Hershiser was mentioned as a candidate to replace Jim Tracy as manager of the Dodgers, but the position went to Grady Little. He was also mentioned as a possible replacement for Ken Macha of the Oakland Athletics; however, he was ultimately passed over for Bob Geren. He left his position of Rangers pitching coach after the 2005 season to become an executive director of the Rangers, reporting to Club President Jeff Cogen. He did not last long in that position as he quit on February 3, 2006.

On February 13, 2006, Hershiser rejoined ESPN as an analyst for Baseball Tonight, Sunday Night Baseball, and the Little League World Series.

Through a group that included fellow former Dodger Steve Garvey, Hershiser became involved in the bidding process for the Dodgers when the team was up for sale in 2011–12. His group did not make it past the first round of the bidding.

In 2014, Hershiser left ESPN and rejoined the Dodgers as a television analyst for their new regional sports network SportsNet LA. At the time, he teamed with Charley Steiner and Nomar Garciaparra to call Dodger road games not played in California when Vin Scully reduced his travel. Since 2017, he has worked with Joe Davis as the primary broadcast team for Dodger baseball following Scully's retirement at the end of the 2016 season.

On August 13, 2026, Hershiser was honored with the 2,853rd star on the Hollywood Walk of Fame, becoming the fifth personality to be honored under its sports entertainment category. His star is located at 6755 Hollywood Boulevard; the location was selected as 67 signified his streak of 59 scoreless innings in addition to the 8 shutout innings he pitched against the New York Mets in the 1988 National League Championship Series, while 55 represented the number he wore on his jersey for most of his career.

== Poker ==
Hershiser started playing poker competitively in 2006. After retirement from baseball, he moved to Summerlin, Nevada, and befriended a poker instructor. He became a regular at Red Rock's poker room in Summerlin, playing $2–$5 No Limit Hold'em.

Hershiser signed with Poker Royalty to represent his poker career. He was invited to participate in the 2008 NBC National Heads-Up Poker Championship. Playing under the PokerStars banner, Hershiser stunned the poker world by making the quarterfinals, defeating 2006 event champion Ted Forrest, Allen Cunningham, and Freddy Deeb—players who had won a total of 12 World Series of Poker bracelets heading into the event. Andy Bloch defeated him in the quarterfinals.

Hershiser has played in a number of events, including the 2008 World Series of Poker and the 2009 PokerStars Caribbean Adventure. Hershiser won $54,570 on September 7, 2008, by taking ninth place in the $10,000 PokerStars World Championship of Online Poker Event 5. Hershiser also has made a tradition of giving an autographed baseball to the poker player who eliminates him.

== Personal life ==
Hershiser is descended from a Hessian soldier who came to North America to fight in the American Revolutionary War. There have been people named Orel in his family "for longer than anyone can remember" and he was teased for the name as a child. He did not know until he was informed by Martina Navratilova during the filming of a commercial that it meant eagle in Czech.

Hershiser and his first wife, Jamie Byars, divorced in 2005. They have two sons, Orel Leonard V (known as Quinton) and Jordan. In 2010, Hershiser married his second wife, Dana Deaver. Jordan graduated from St. Mark's School of Texas in 2007, where he earned all-conference honors in baseball and basketball, and played college baseball at the University of Southern California as a pitcher and first baseman. Despite his college career being hampered by injuries, Jordan was drafted by the Dodgers in the 34th round of the 2012 MLB draft. Hershiser and Deaver live in Las Vegas with Deaver's two children.

Hershiser is an active Christian. He was a guest star on the 1992 episode of the Christian children's video series McGee and Me! "Take Me Out of the Ball Game". On an appearance on The Tonight Show after the 1988 World Series, Johnny Carson talked him into singing hymns for the audience.

== Books ==
- Orel Hershiser and Jerry B. Jenkins (1989). Out of the Blue. Wolgemuth & Hyatt. ISBN 0-943497-57-4.
- Orel Hershiser (2002). Between the Lines: Nine Things Baseball Taught Me About Life. Warner Faith. ISBN 0-446-67907-0.

== See also ==
- List of Major League Baseball individual streaks
- List of Major League Baseball annual shutout leaders
- List of Major League Baseball annual wins leaders
- List of Major League Baseball career double plays leaders
- List of Major League Baseball career games started leaders
- List of Major League Baseball career hit batsmen leaders
- List of Major League Baseball career putouts leaders
- List of Major League Baseball career strikeout leaders
- List of Major League Baseball career WAR leaders
- List of Major League Baseball career wins leaders
- List of Major League Baseball pitchers who have thrown an immaculate inning
- List of Major League Baseball postseason records
- List of World Series starting pitchers

Awards and achievements
Preceded by Fernando Valenzuela; Tim Belcher; Ramón Martínez	Los Angeles Dodgers Opening Day; Starting pitcher 1987; 1990; 1993–1994	Succeeded by Fernando Valenzuela; Tim Belcher; Ramón Martínez
