= Count (baseball) =

Number of balls and strikes in a plate appearance

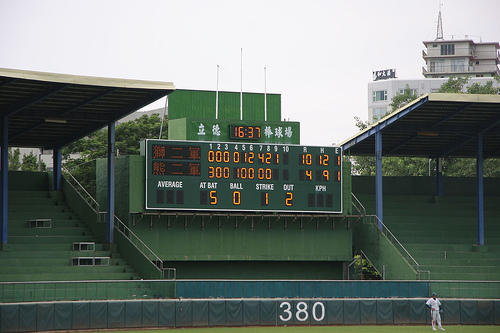
A baseball scoreboard with numerals showing the count (center of the bottom row) as no balls and one strike ("oh and one")

In baseball and softball, the count is the number of balls and strikes the batter has. If the count reaches three strikes, the batter strikes out; if the count reaches four balls, the batter earns a base on balls (a "walk").

== Usage ==
The count is usually announced as a pair of numbers, for example, 3–1 (pronounced as "three and one"), the number of balls followed by the number of strikes. Zero is almost always pronounced as "oh". The count is often used as adjective—an individual pitch may be referred to by the count prior to its delivery; for example, a pitch thrown on a 3–1 count is a "three-one pitch" or a "three-and-one pitch". (Note: Players may shorten the count even further, stating it simply as a number, for example 31 ("thirty-one") for 3–1.)

A count of 0–0 is rarely stated; the count is typically not mentioned until at least one pitch has been thrown. (Note: Some leagues, most commonly in slow-pitch softball, treat plate appearances as starting with non-zero counts—for example, 1–1—to speed up the game.) A count of 1–1 or 2–2 may be described as even. A count of 3–2 is full, which is discussed below.

The home plate umpire signals the count with the number of balls on the left hand, and the number of strikes on the right hand. (As a result, it reads backwards when viewed from the pitcher's point of view.) Individual umpires vary in how frequently they give this signal; it is often done as a reminder when there has been a slight delay between pitches, such as due to the batter stepping out of the batter's box. It can also signal the scoreboard operator that the board shows an incorrect count. Some umpires may also call out the count, although usually only the batter and catcher can hear it.

== Significance ==
Baseball statistics measure which counts are most likely to produce favorable outcomes for the pitcher or the batter. Counts of 3–1 and 2–0 are considered advantageous to batters ("hitters' counts"), because the pitcher—faced with the possibility of walking the batter—is more likely to throw a ball in the strike zone, particularly a fastball. Counts with two strikes (except 3–2) are considered advantageous to pitchers ("pitchers' counts"). An 0–2 count is very favorable to a pitcher, who has the freedom to throw one or two pitches out of the strike zone intentionally, to get the batter to "chase" the pitch (swing at it), and strike out.

A 3–0 count tends to yield fewer hittable pitches, perhaps because the umpire is reluctant to call four straight balls and may tolerate a fourth pitch that barely misses the strike zone. Batters often "take" (do not swing at) a 3–0 pitch, since the pitcher has missed the strike zone three straight times already, and a fourth would earn the batter a walk. This is a sound strategy because the batter is more likely to eventually reach base even if the count becomes 3–1 than he is if he puts the ball in play on 3–0. It is sometimes also advantageous to take on 2–0 and 3–1.

== Full count ==
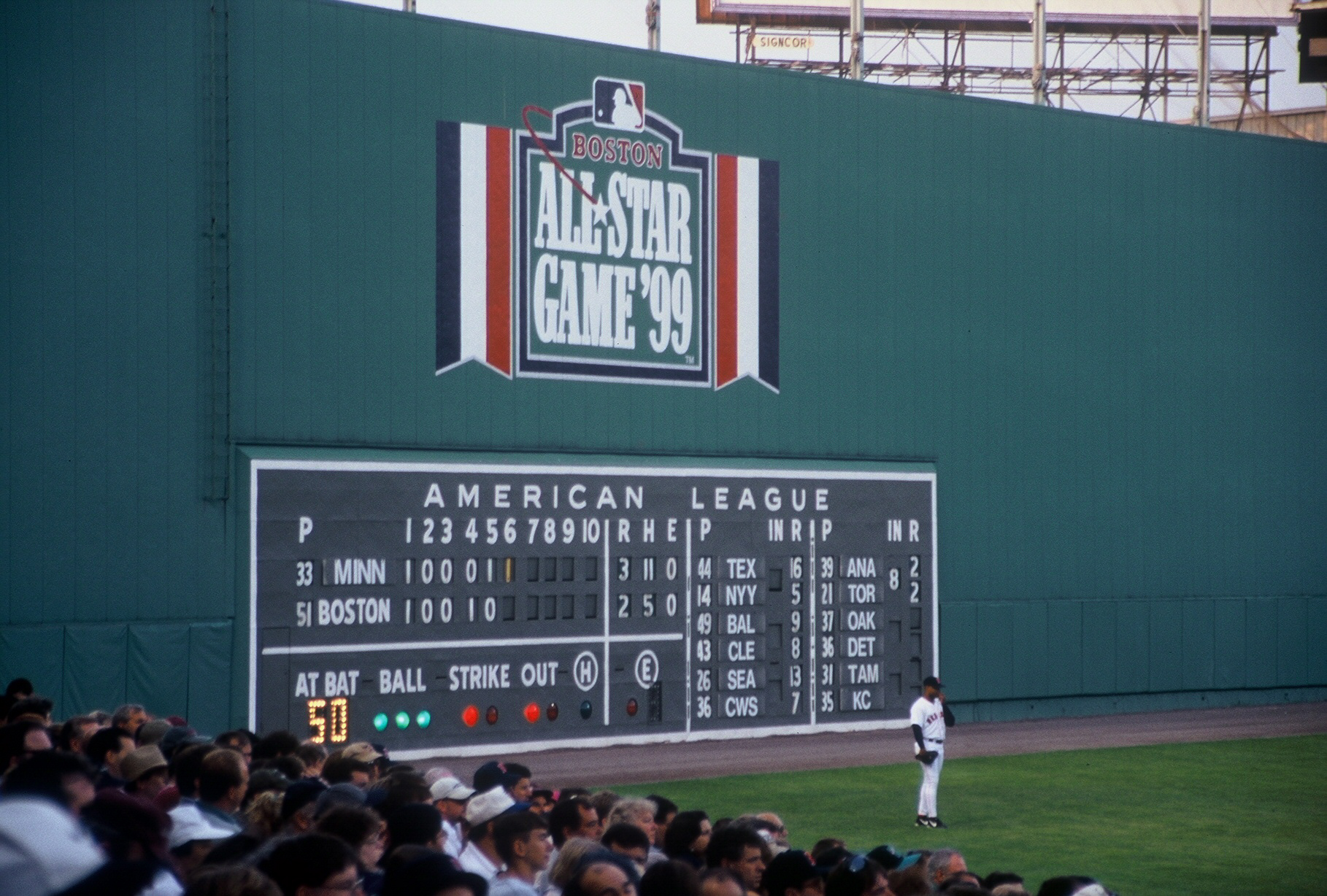
The Green Monster at Fenway Park with light bulbs showing the count as three balls and one strike ("three and one")

A 3–2 count is called a full count and the ensuing pitch is called a "payoff pitch", since a mistake by either the pitcher or the batter ends the plate appearance. The payoff pitch is not necessarily the final pitch in the plate appearance, as a batter may maintain two strikes indefinitely by hitting foul balls. (Note: Slow-pitch softball rules normally stipulate that a foul ball hit with two strikes results in the batter being called out.)

The full count term may derive from older scoreboards, which had spaces (rather than numerals) to denote up to three balls and up to two strikes. Many scoreboards still use light bulbs for this purpose; thus a 3–2 count means that all the bulbs are lit. The alternate term full house (more commonly used in softball) is inspired by the full house hand in poker, consisting of three of a kind and a pair.

With two outs and a full count, any baserunners who might be forced out start to run toward the next base at the moment the pitcher begins to deliver the pitch. This is because either the batter will walk (awarding such runners the next base), strike out to end the inning, foul off the pitch (allowing runners to return to their original bases), or put the ball into play.

=== History ===
The full count was not always 3–2, and went through an evolution in the 1870s and 1880s, seeing a gradual reduction in balls allowed before a bases on balls was called. Prior to 1901, fouls were not counted as strikes (though foul bunts were, onwards from 1894).

Year	Full count	Notes
1871–1874	2–2	Balls only called on pitches in dirt, behind batter, etc., considered "unfair balls".
1875–1879	8–2	Every pitch must be called a ball, strike, or foul.
1880–1881	7–2	
1882–1883	6–2	
1884–1885	5–2 (NL); 6–2 (AA)	
1886	6–2 (NL); 5–2 (AA)	
1887	4–3	
1888	4–2	
1889–present	3–2	
