= Los Angeles Dodgers =

Major League Baseball franchise

- 2026 Los Angeles Dodgers season

Logo	Cap insignia
- Established in 1883; Based in Los Angeles since 1958

Major league affiliations
- National League (1890–present); West Division (1969–present); American Association (1884–1889)

Current uniform
- Retired numbers: 1; 2; 4; 14; 19; 20; 24; 32; 34; 39; 42; 53

Colors
- Dodger blue, white, red

Name
- Los Angeles Dodgers (1958–present); Brooklyn Dodgers (1932–1957); Brooklyn Robins (1914–1931); Brooklyn Dodgers (1913); Brooklyn Trolley Dodgers (1911–1912); Brooklyn Superbas (1899–1910); Brooklyn Bridegrooms (1896–1898); Brooklyn Grooms (1891–1895); Brooklyn Bridegrooms (1888–1890); Brooklyn Grays (1885–1887); Brooklyn Atlantics (1884); Brooklyn Grays (1883)

Nicknames
- The Boys in Blue

Ballpark
- Dodger Stadium (1962–present); Los Angeles Memorial Coliseum (1958–1961); Roosevelt Stadium (1956–1957); Ebbets Field (1913–1957); Washington Park (II) (1898–1912); Eastern Park (1891–1897); Ridgewood Park (1886–1889) (Note: Sunday games only.); Washington Park (I) (1884–1890)

Major league titles
- World Series titles (9): 1955; 1959; 1963; 1965; 1981; 1988; 2020; 2024; 2025
- NL pennants (26): 1890; 1899; 1900; 1916; 1920; 1941; 1947; 1949; 1952; 1953; 1955; 1956; 1959; 1963; 1965; 1966; 1974; 1977; 1978; 1981; 1988; 2017; 2018; 2020; 2024; 2025
- AA pennants (1): 1889
- West division titles (24): 1974; 1977; 1978; 1981; 1983; 1985; 1988; 1995; 2004; 2008; 2009; 2013; 2014; 2015; 2016; 2017; 2018; 2019; 2020; 2022; 2023; 2024; 2025; 2026
- Chronicle-Telegraph Cup (1): 1900
- Wild card berths (3): 1996; 2006; 2021

Front office
- Principal owners: Guggenheim Baseball Management; Mark Walter (chairman)
- President: Stan Kasten
- President of baseball operations: Andrew Friedman
- General manager: Brandon Gomes
- Manager: Dave Roberts
- Website: mlb.com/dodgers

The Los Angeles Dodgers are an American professional baseball team based in Los Angeles. The Dodgers compete in Major League Baseball (MLB) as a member club of the National League (NL) West Division. The club has won nine World Series championships and a record 26 National League pennants. (Note: The franchise has won 26 National League pennants but has appeared in 23 World Series. The pennants of 1890, 1899 and 1900 predate the modern World Series, first played in 1903. Brooklyn also took part in two 19th-century World's Series: it lost to the New York Giants six games to three in 1889 as champion of the American Association, and finished three games to three, with one tie, against the Louisville Colonels in 1890. Baseball-Reference's franchise total of 27 pennants counts that 1889 American Association championship alongside the 26 National League pennants.) As of 2026, Forbes ranked the Dodgers second in MLB franchise valuation at $7.8 billion.

Founded in 1883 in Brooklyn, New York, the team joined the NL in 1890 as the Brooklyn Bridegrooms and used other names before becoming the Brooklyn Dodgers in 1932. The Dodgers broke the baseball color line in 1947 with the debut of Jackie Robinson, the first African American to play in the Major Leagues since 1884. From the 1940s through the mid-1950s, the Dodgers had a crosstown rivalry with the New York Yankees. The clubs have faced each other in the World Series a record 12 times, with the Dodgers losing the first five matchups before winning the franchise's first title, and its only one in Brooklyn, in 1955. The following year Don Newcombe became the first player to win the Cy Young Award and be named NL MVP in the same season.

After 68 seasons in Brooklyn, Dodgers owner and president Walter O'Malley moved the franchise to Los Angeles before the 1958 season. The team played their first four seasons at the Los Angeles Memorial Coliseum before moving to their current home of Dodger Stadium in 1962. They won the 1959 World Series in their second season on the West Coast, and took further titles in 1963 and 1965 behind the pitchers Sandy Koufax and Don Drysdale. In 1981 the rookie pitcher Fernando Valenzuela led the team to a championship; he remains the only player to win the Cy Young and Rookie of the Year awards in the same season. The Dodgers won again in 1988, becoming the only franchise to win multiple titles in the 1980s. They then made 12 postseason appearances in a 17-year span before ending the championship drought in 2020. After signing the two-way player Shohei Ohtani in December 2023 to what was then the largest contract in North American sports history, the Dodgers won consecutive World Series titles in 2024 and 2025, the first team to repeat since the Yankees won three in a row from 1998 to 2000.

The O'Malley family owned the Dodgers for 48 years before selling the club to Rupert Murdoch's Fox Group in 1998. Frank and Jamie McCourt bought the team in 2004; amid their divorce and the franchise's debts, Major League Baseball took over day-to-day operations and the Dodgers filed for bankruptcy protection in 2011. Guggenheim Baseball Management purchased the club in 2012 for $2.15 billion, then the highest price ever paid for a North American professional sports franchise. Thirteen Dodgers have been named National League Most Valuable Player and eight Dodger pitchers have won twelve Cy Young Awards, while eighteen have won the Rookie of the Year Award, more than any other franchise. From 1884 through 2026, the Dodgers' record is 11,625–10,199–139 (.532). The club draws among the largest home attendances in Major League Baseball, and its rivalry with the San Francisco Giants has spanned more than a century as a New York City cross-town affair and then a California cross-state one.

== History ==
The franchise was founded in Brooklyn in 1883 and played there until it moved to Los Angeles for the 1958 season.

=== 1883–1912: Founding in Brooklyn ===
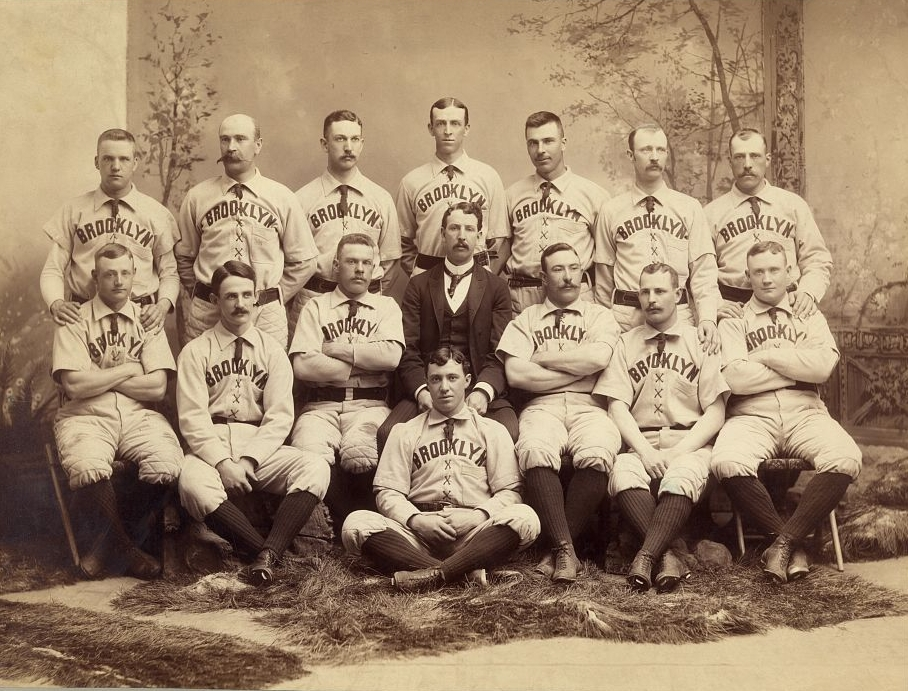
The 1889 Brooklyn Bridegrooms, who won the American Association pennant before the club joined the National League the following year.

The club was formed as the Brooklyn Baseball Association in 1883, playing that season in the Interstate League. It joined the major league American Association in 1884 — the season it played as the Brooklyn Atlantics, borrowing the name of a defunct team that had played in Brooklyn before them — won the American Association championship in 1889, and joined the National League in 1890, promptly winning the National League pennant in its first season in the league.

The club was organized by a group that included the Brooklyn real estate man Charles Byrne and Ferdinand Abell, a Rhode Island casino operator who supplied most of the capital and held a controlling interest through the 1890s. Charles Ebbets, who had joined the club in its first season as a bookkeeper and scorecard salesman and worked for it for 42 years, succeeded Byrne as president upon Byrne's death in January 1898 and spent the following decade accumulating stock, buying out Abell and the remaining outside interests in November 1907.

=== 1913–1938: Ebbets Field and the Robins ===
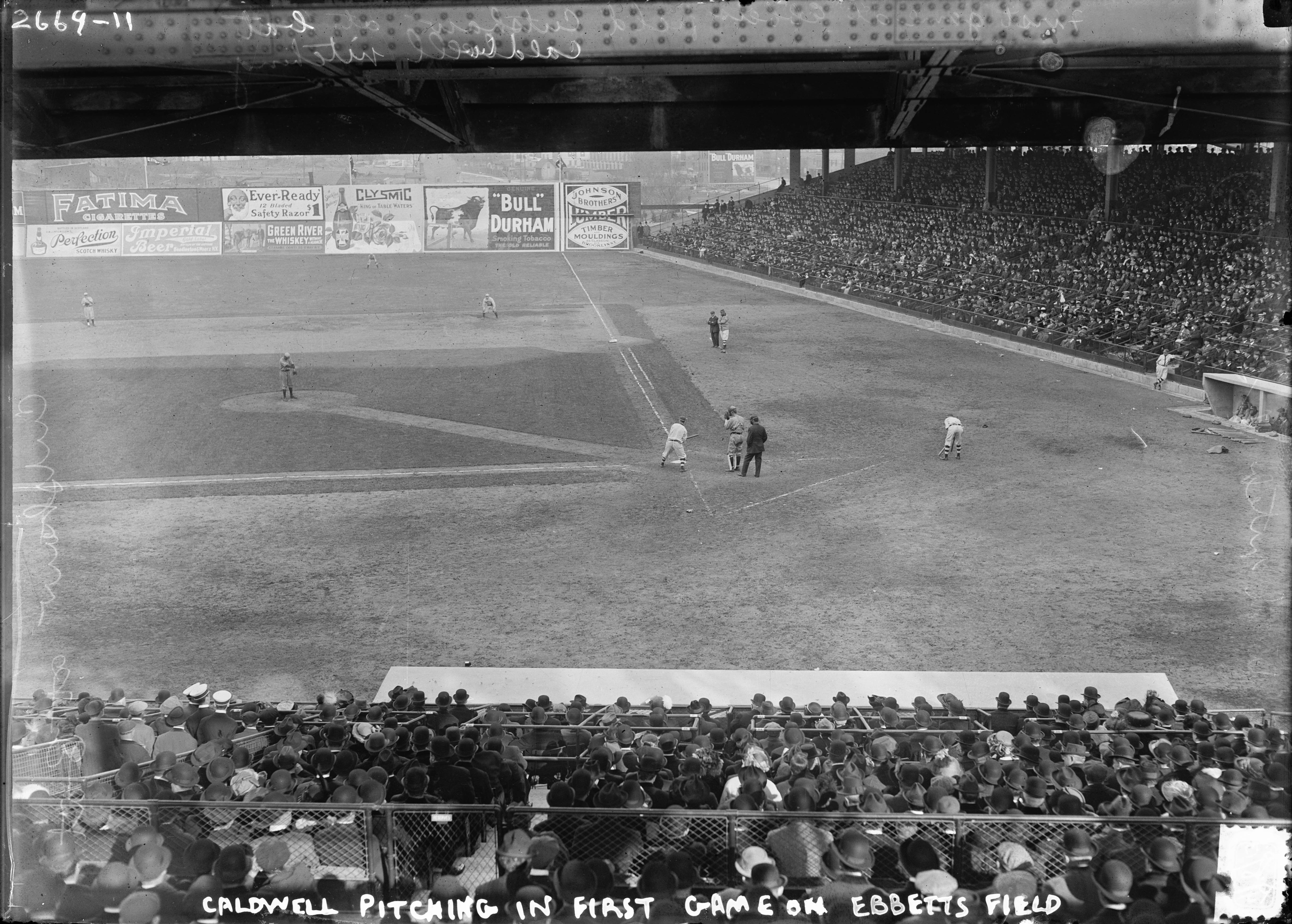
The first game played at Ebbets Field, an exhibition against the Yankees on April 5, 1913.

Ebbets bought 25 to 30 parcels of land in secrecy so that word of the plan would not drive prices up, and to finance construction he sold half the club in August 1912 to the Brooklyn contractors Edward and Stephen McKeever, who took 25 percent each. Ebbets Field opened for the National League opener on April 9, 1913; the park seated about 24,000. Late that year the club hired Wilbert Robinson as manager. He held the job for 18 seasons, and the team became widely known as the Robins after him.

Brooklyn won the National League pennant in 1916 at 94–60 and lost the World Series to the Boston Red Sox in five games. A second pennant followed in 1920, a 93–61 season that drew an unprecedented 809,000 spectators to Ebbets Field, second best in the National League; Brooklyn lost that World Series to the Cleveland Indians, five games to two.

Ebbets died on April 18, 1925, and Edward McKeever died eleven days after his funeral, leaving the Ebbets and McKeever heirs holding exactly half the stock apiece and deadlocking the board for more than a decade. Robinson served as club president as well as manager from 1925 to 1929, years in which the team became known as the "Daffy Dodgers". After finishing second in 1924, a game and a half back, Brooklyn placed sixth in each of the next five seasons, and Robinson was replaced by Max Carey after the 1931 season. The club added roughly 9,000 seats to Ebbets Field in 1931, but attendance fell below 500,000 from 1934 through 1937, and the 1937 team lost 91 games.

The club lost money every year from 1931 through 1937 and fell more than $700,000 into debt to the Brooklyn Trust Company, whose chairman, George V. McLaughlin, effectively directed the franchise and installed Larry MacPhail as general manager in 1938. MacPhail introduced night baseball at Ebbets Field and hired Red Barber to broadcast the games.

=== 1939–1957: Branch Rickey, Jackie Robinson, and the last Brooklyn years ===
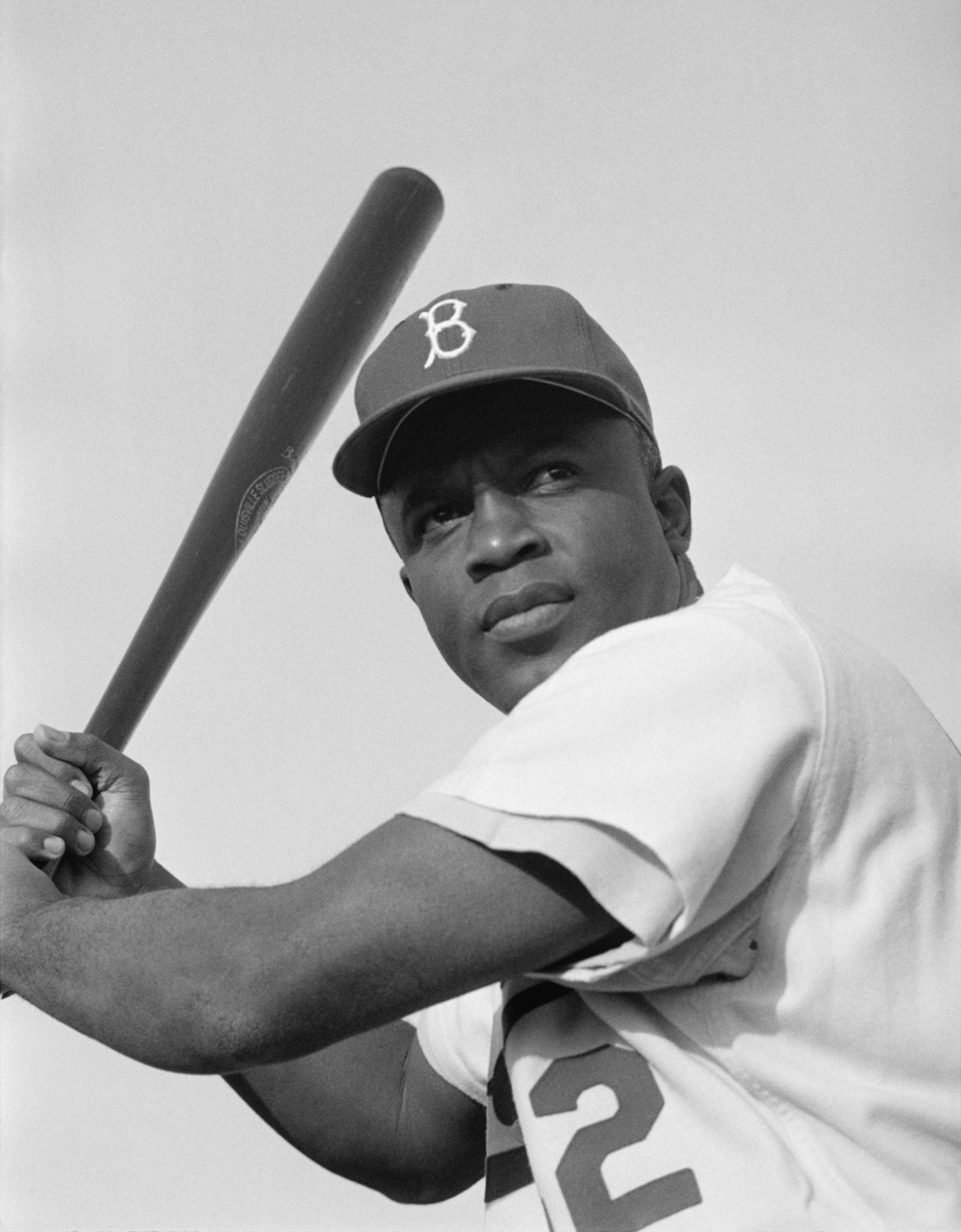
Jackie Robinson, who grew up in Pasadena, California, broke baseball's color barrier in 1947 with the Brooklyn Dodgers

In 1941, the Dodgers won the National League pennant and reached the World Series for the third time, losing to the New York Yankees. This marked the onset of the Dodgers–Yankees rivalry, as the Dodgers would face them in their next six World Series appearances.

The deadlock between the Ebbets and McKeever heirs ended in stages: in October 1944 a group including Branch Rickey, the attorney Walter O'Malley and the Pfizer president John L. Smith bought the McKeever estate's quarter share for $240,000, and in August 1945 the three purchased the Ebbets estate's half for $800,000.

For most of the first half of the 20th century, no Major League Baseball team employed an African American player. Jackie Robinson became the first African American to play in the major leagues since 1884 when he played his first major league game on April 15, 1947, as a member of the Brooklyn Dodgers. (Note: The brothers Moses Fleetwood Walker and Weldy Walker played for Toledo of the American Association in 1884. No African American appeared in the major leagues between then and Robinson's debut.) This was mainly due to general manager Branch Rickey's efforts. Baseball researcher Andy McCue attributes Rickey's pursuit of African American players to a combination of motives: his religious beliefs, his desire to win games and draw fans, and his ability to see baseball in the context of American society. Rickey came from a devout Methodist family and had a reputation as a lay preacher.

Robinson's debut preceded Brown v. Board of Education and the Montgomery bus boycott, and is regarded as an early moment in the American Civil Rights Movement. It also hastened the decline of the Negro leagues: attendance in black baseball fell sharply in 1947 as fans followed Robinson to Ebbets Field and to Dodgers road games, and the Negro National League folded after the 1948 season. Robinson batted .311 over ten seasons in Brooklyn, and in 1949 won the National League batting title with a .342 average and led the league with 37 stolen bases. He was the inaugural recipient of the Rookie of the Year award, which is now named the Jackie Robinson Award in his honor. Robinson would eventually go on to become the first African American elected to the Baseball Hall of Fame in 1962.

The Dodgers' willingness to integrate, when most other teams refused to, was a key factor in their 1947–1956 success. They won six pennants in those 10 years with the help of Robinson, three-time National League Most Valuable Player Roy Campanella, also signed out of the Negro leagues, Cy Young Award winner Don Newcombe, Jim Gilliam and Joe Black. They captured their first World Series title in 1955 by defeating the Yankees for the first time, a story described in the 1972 book The Boys of Summer.

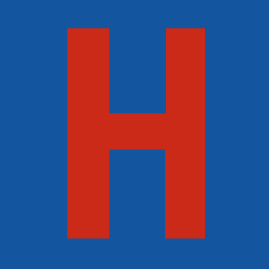
The PCL's Hollywood Stars (logo, pictured) and Angels played in L.A. before the arrival of the Dodgers in 1958

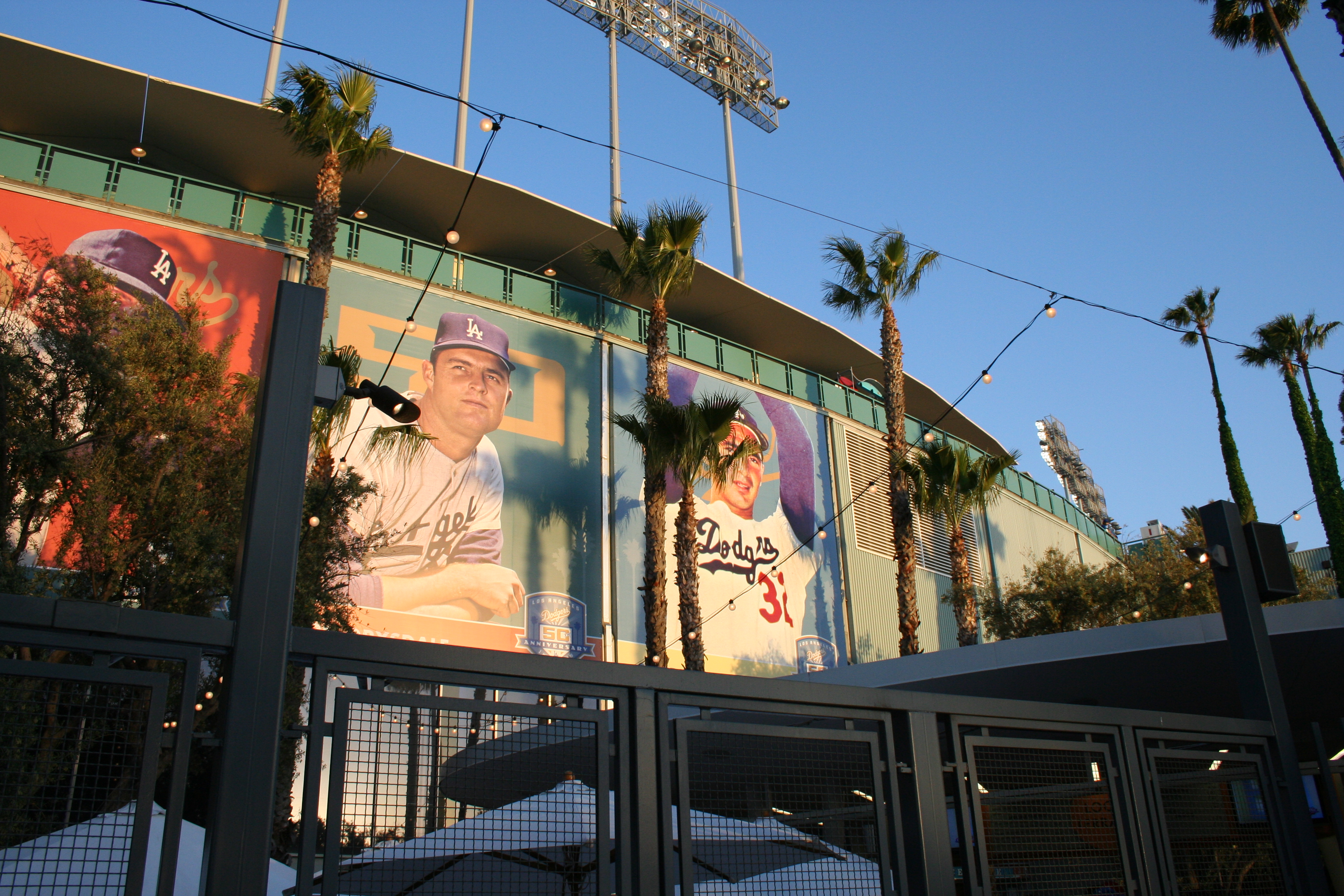
Former Dodger greats who played in both Brooklyn and Los Angeles adorn the exterior of Dodger Stadium.

O'Malley acquired majority ownership of the Dodgers in 1950 when he bought the 25 percent share of co-owner Branch Rickey and became allied with the widow of John L. Smith. Smith had died that July, leaving his widow aligned with O'Malley, and under the partnership's buyout terms the Rickey share cost slightly more than $1 million. (Note: McCue gives the accepted figure as $1,025,000; the O'Malley family's reference site states $1,050,000, a difference generally attributed to a side payment connected to the competing bid from the developer William Zeckendorf.) O'Malley bought Mrs. Smith's share in 1957, giving him two-thirds of the club; he acquired the remaining third from the James and Dearie Mulvey estate in January 1975 to become sole owner. Through the 1950s he was working to buy new land in Brooklyn to build a more accessible and profitable ballpark than the aging Ebbets Field. The Dodgers could no longer fill the park even for the World Series; Games Six and Seven of the 1952 Series did not sell out.

O'Malley wanted to replace Ebbets Field with a privately financed stadium at Atlantic and Flatbush avenues in Brooklyn, saying that he did not want to be "a tenant in a political ball park". He asked the city to assemble the land under Title I of the Housing Act of 1949, which funded slum clearance. Robert Moses, who as head of the city's Committee on Slum Clearance controlled that money, refused, writing that the plan did not justify "the exercise of the power of eminent domain, not to speak of the use of public funds to reduce the cost of land". The Dodgers offered $1.5 million toward a site whose acquisition was estimated at over $9 million, which would have left the city paying about 90 percent of the cost. To put pressure on the city, O'Malley announced during the 1955 season that the team would play seven regular-season games and one exhibition game at Jersey City's Roosevelt Stadium in 1956. Mayor Robert Wagner convened a meeting three days later, and the Board of Estimate appropriated $100,000 to study the site.

In the autumn of 1956 the Los Angeles County Board of Supervisors sent Kenneth Hahn to the World Series to pursue a major league team for the city, and he met Washington Senators owner Calvin Griffith; O'Malley learned of the approach and told Hahn that he was interested himself. Los Angeles offered what New York would not: land O'Malley could buy and a ballpark he would own. Moses proposed instead a city-owned stadium at Flushing Meadows–Corona Park in Queens, which O'Malley rejected because he would not own it; the mayor's Special Committee ruled the Queens site out in May 1957. Mayor Wagner and the Board of Estimate declined to subsidize a stadium, taking the view that a baseball franchise was a private business. In Brooklyn, a "Keep the Dodgers in Brooklyn" petition launched by borough president John Cashmore drew 25,000 signatures. National League owners voted unanimously on May 29, 1957, to authorize both the Dodgers and the Giants to move to the West Coast, provided each club confirmed its intention before October 1. Giants owner Horace Stoneham had decided by March 1957 to move his club to Minneapolis, home of his Triple-A Minneapolis Millers; he chose San Francisco instead, encouraged by O'Malley and by Los Angeles mayor Norris Poulson.

The Brooklyn Dodgers played their final game at Ebbets Field on September 24, 1957, beating the Pittsburgh Pirates 2–0.

=== 1958–1973: Los Angeles, Dodger Stadium, and the Koufax era ===
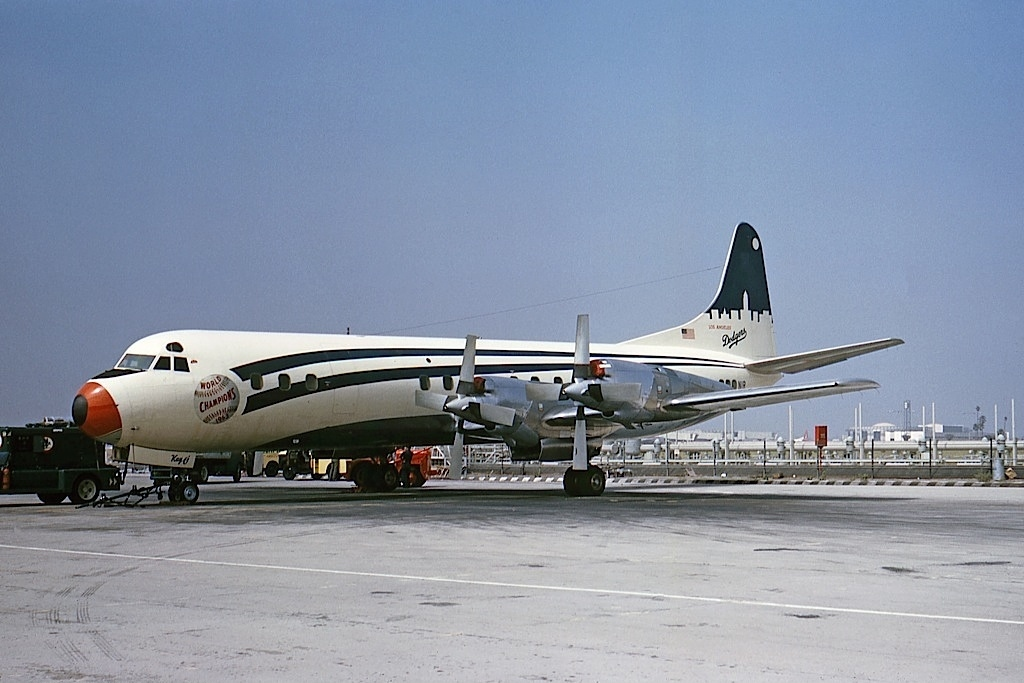
"World Champions" team aircraft, Los Angeles International Airport 1964

For the 1958 season, the Dodgers moved to Los Angeles and kept their nickname, even though pedestrians in Los Angeles were not known for dodging trolleys. The Giants also kept their nickname when they moved to San Francisco for that season as well. These moves left New York with only one baseball team, the American League Yankees, and without a National League team until 1962, when Joan Payson founded the New York Mets. The blue background used by the Dodgers was adopted by the Mets, honoring their New York NL forebears with a blend of Dodgers blue and Giants orange.

On April 18, 1958, the Dodgers played the first major league game in Los Angeles, defeating the former New York and now new San Francisco Giants, 6–5, at the Los Angeles Memorial Coliseum. Catcher Roy Campanella, left partially paralyzed in an off-season accident, was never able to play in Los Angeles.

In just their second season in Los Angeles, the Dodgers won their second World Series title, beating the Chicago White Sox in six games in 1959.

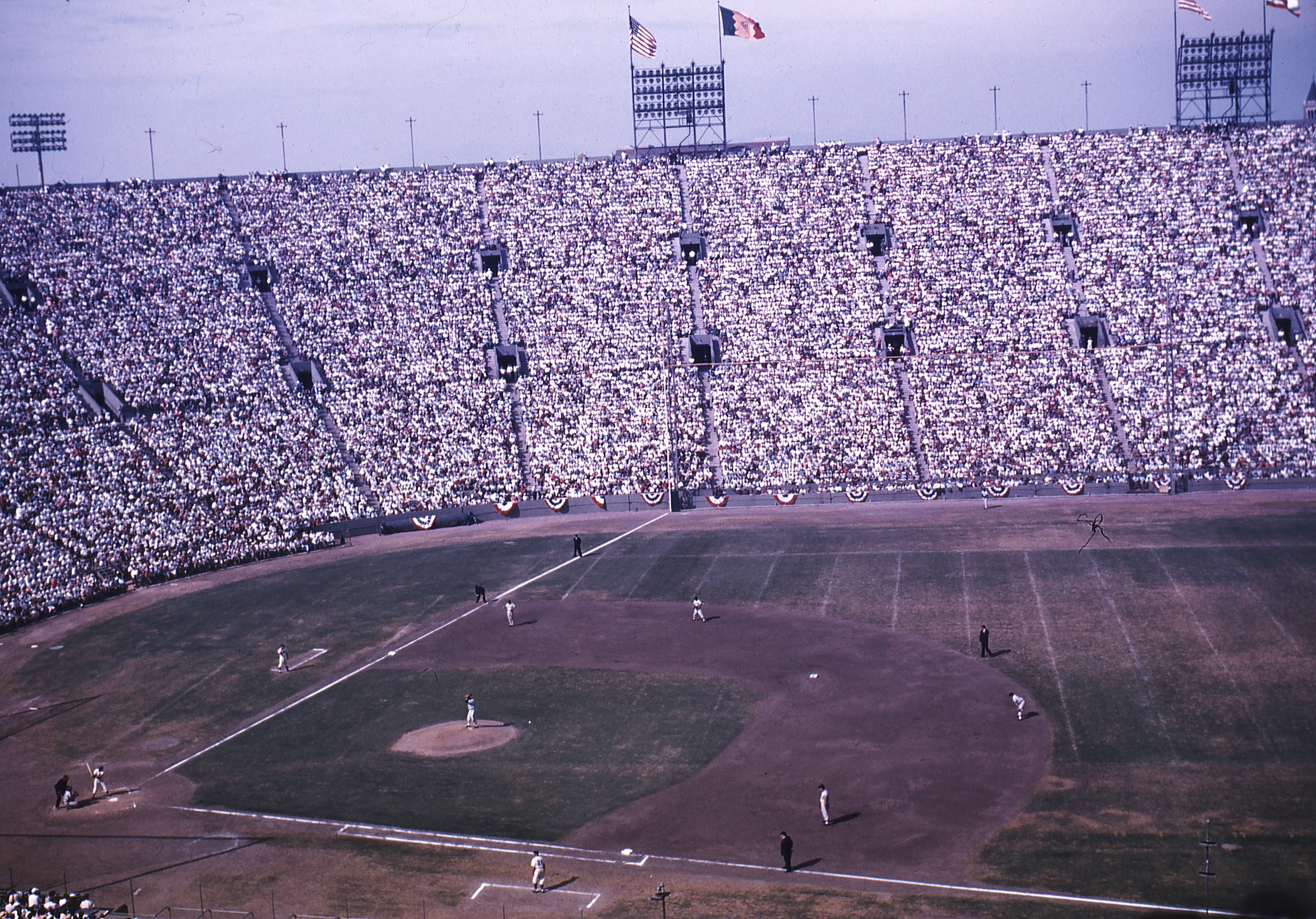
The 1959 World Series was played partially at the Los Angeles Coliseum while Dodger Stadium was being built.

Construction on Dodger Stadium was completed in time for Opening Day of the 1962 season. Cantilevered grandstands replaced the pillars used in older parks, and O'Malley promoted the resulting unobstructed views as a selling point; the trade-off was that seats above the lowest deck sat farther from the field than comparable seats elsewhere. Although close to downtown Los Angeles, the stadium was surrounded by parking lots and framed by three freeways, with limited public transport. The park favored pitching. O'Malley privately financed and built Dodger Stadium, retaining ownership of the ballpark and its revenue streams.

In the club's first season at the new park, Maury Wills stole 104 bases, a major league record, and was named the National League's Most Valuable Player. The Dodgers and the Giants finished the season tied at 101–61, but the Giants took the pennant by winning the third game of a best-of-three playoff at Dodger Stadium on October 3.

Behind the pitching of Sandy Koufax and Don Drysdale, the Dodgers captured three pennants in the 1960s and won two more World Series titles, sweeping the Yankees in four games in 1963, and edging the Minnesota Twins in seven in 1965. The 1963 sweep was their second victory against the Yankees, and their first against them as a Los Angeles team. Koufax won the National League's Most Valuable Player award and its pitching Triple Crown in 1963, and was the first pitcher to win three Cy Young Awards, all of them in years when one award covered both major leagues. He threw four no-hitters, the last of them a perfect game against the Chicago Cubs on September 9, 1965. Drysdale won the Cy Young Award in 1962, and in 1968 pitched 58 2/3 consecutive scoreless innings, breaking a record set by Walter Johnson in 1913.

The Dodgers won another pennant in 1966 but were swept in the World Series by the Baltimore Orioles. Koufax retired after that season at the age of 30, his left elbow disabled by arthritis.

=== 1974–1997: Lasorda, Fernandomania, and the 1988 title ===
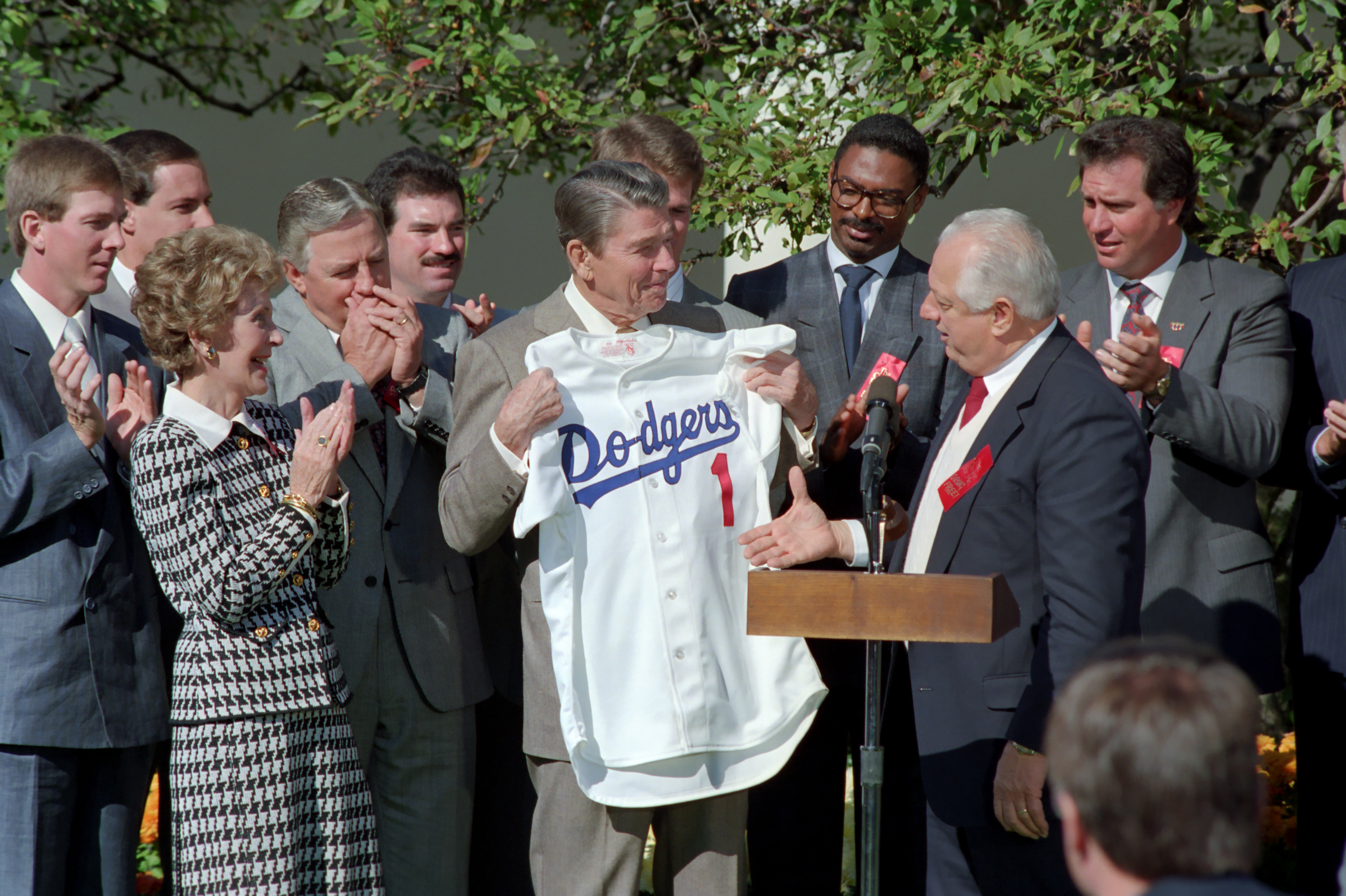
President Ronald Reagan is presented with a jersey as the Dodgers are honored at the White House after the 1988 World Series

Steve Garvey, Davey Lopes, Ron Cey and Bill Russell first started together as the Dodgers' infield on June 13, 1973, and stayed together longer than any infield in major league history, surpassing the Chicago White Stockings combination of 1883–89.

Walter Alston retired after the 1976 season, ending 23 years as manager, and was succeeded by Tommy Lasorda. The Dodgers won pennants in 1974, 1977 and 1978 and lost the World Series each time, to the Oakland Athletics and then to the Yankees twice. They won the World Series again in 1981, when the rookie Fernando Valenzuela took both the Cy Young Award and the Rookie of the Year Award, the only player to win both in one season; the attention around him became known as "Fernandomania".

Walter O'Malley died in 1979, and control passed to a trust for his children, Peter O'Malley and Therese O'Malley Seidler, with Peter serving as president and chairman.

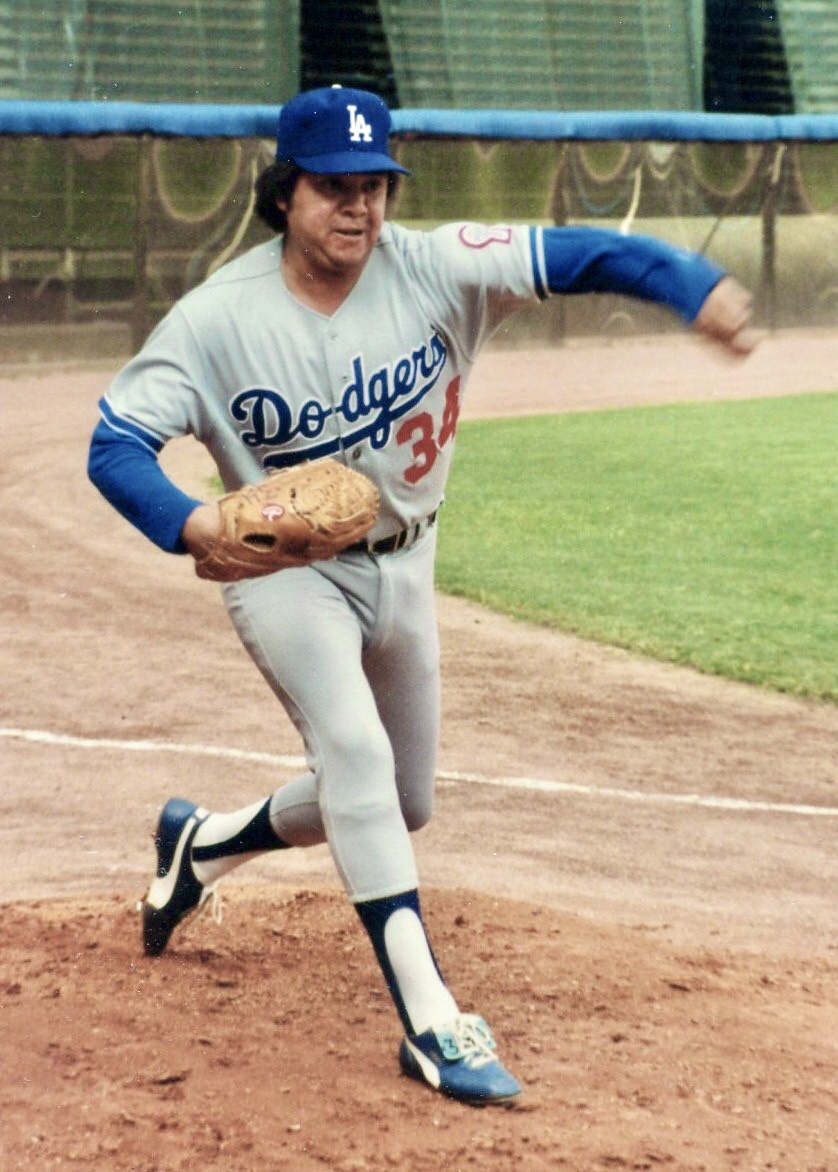
Fernando Valenzuela

The Dodgers won the National League West in 1983 and in 1985, losing the Championship Series both times.

Orel Hershiser closed the 1988 regular season with 59 consecutive scoreless innings, breaking Drysdale's record, and won the Cy Young Award. The Dodgers went on to win the World Series against the Oakland Athletics. In the first game Kirk Gibson, injured in both knees, came off the bench to pinch-hit with two outs in the bottom of the ninth inning and hit the home run that won it, his only appearance of the series.

The Dodgers did not reach the postseason again until 1995. They won 93 games in 1991 but finished a game behind the Atlanta Braves, then fell to 63–99 in 1992, the franchise's worst record since 1912. Five Dodgers won the National League Rookie of the Year Award in consecutive seasons over this stretch: Eric Karros in 1992, Mike Piazza in 1993, Raúl Mondesí in 1994, Hideo Nomo in 1995 and Todd Hollandsworth in 1996.

Los Angeles led the National League West when the players' strike ended the 1994 season in August, and no postseason was played. The club reached the Division Series in 1995 as division champions and in 1996 as the wild card, and was swept in three games each time, by the Cincinnati Reds and the Atlanta Braves. Lasorda's 20 seasons as manager ended during the 1996 season, when Bill Russell replaced him.

In January 1997 Peter O'Malley announced that the club was for sale, citing estate-tax exposure and his view that family ownership could no longer compete with corporate-backed franchises.

=== 1998–2012: Fox, McCourt, and bankruptcy ===
Joe Torre at Dodger Stadium in September 2008, his first season as manager

Major League Baseball's owners approved the sale of the Dodgers to Rupert Murdoch's Fox Group, a division of News Corporation, by a vote of 27–2 on March 19, 1998, ending 48 years of O'Malley family control. (Note: The transaction is most consistently reported at $311 million; some contemporaneous accounts valued the deal at up to $350 million, apparently including assumed obligations and real estate.) The $311 million purchase included the franchise, Dodger Stadium and roughly 300 surrounding acres, and the club's training complexes in Vero Beach, Florida and the Dominican Republic. Fox had sought the team primarily as programming for its regional sports networks and as a competitive response to Disney's ownership of the Anaheim Angels.

The Fox ownership era proved turbulent. The May 1998 trade of catcher Mike Piazza was executed without the knowledge of general manager Fred Claire, who was dismissed along with manager Bill Russell the following month; Peter O'Malley resigned as chairman before the end of the year. In 1999 Fox sold a minority stake to the former Warner Bros. chairman Bob Daly, who took over as chairman and chief executive. The Dodgers did not reach the postseason in any of the six seasons under Fox ownership, finishing second in the National League West twice. Closer Éric Gagné won the National League Cy Young Award in 2003, taking 28 of 32 first-place votes.

Major League Baseball approved the sale of the club to the Boston real estate developers Frank and Jamie McCourt on January 29, 2004, for approximately $430 million. (Note: Reported variously as $421 million, $430 million and $431 million, and as a net purchase price of $371 million.) The purchase was almost entirely debt-financed, with Fox itself providing much of the financing, secured against McCourt's parking lots on the South Boston waterfront — property he later conveyed to Fox in lieu of repayment. (Note: Accounts of the size of the Fox loan differ substantially, from roughly $145 million to approximately $330 million; the figures may describe different tranches of seller financing.) By August 2010 the club's debt had grown to roughly $433 million.

In their first season under the new owners the Dodgers won 93 games and returned to the postseason for the first time since 1996, clinching the division on October 2 when Steve Finley hit a walk-off grand slam against the Giants. They lost the National League Division Series to the St. Louis Cardinals that year, and were swept by the New York Mets in the 2006 Division Series.

Joe Torre managed the team from 2008 to 2010. Los Angeles acquired Manny Ramirez from the Boston Red Sox in a three-team trade on July 31, 2008; he batted .396 in 53 games for the Dodgers. The club won the Division Series in both 2008 and 2009, its first postseason series wins since 1988, and lost the National League Championship Series to the Philadelphia Phillies in each of those years.

The McCourts separated in October 2009, and Frank McCourt's dismissal of his wife as chief executive was followed by divorce proceedings in which she asserted a community-property claim to half the franchise. In December 2010 a Los Angeles Superior Court judge invalidated the post-marital agreement that Frank McCourt contended gave him sole ownership. With the club's finances in question, commissioner Bud Selig announced on April 20, 2011, that Major League Baseball would take over the Dodgers' day-to-day operations, citing "deep concerns regarding the finances and operations" of the franchise, and appointed the former Texas Rangers president Tom Schieffer as monitor. Selig rejected a proposed long-term television agreement with Fox that June, and on June 27, 2011, the Dodgers filed for Chapter 11 bankruptcy protection in Delaware, listing deferred compensation owed to Manny Ramirez and Andruw Jones among its largest unsecured claims. The Dodgers had losing records in 2010 and 2011.

The McCourts reached a divorce settlement in October 2011 under which Frank McCourt agreed to pay $131 million and Jamie McCourt relinquished all claims to the team. On November 1, 2011, McCourt and Major League Baseball jointly announced that the franchise would be sold under court supervision.

In March 2012 McCourt agreed to sell the Dodgers to Guggenheim Baseball Management for $2.15 billion, then the highest price ever paid for a North American professional sports franchise and roughly two and a half times the previous Major League Baseball record of $845 million paid for the Chicago Cubs in 2009. The bankruptcy court approved the sale in April and it closed on May 1, 2012. The group was led by the Guggenheim Partners chief executive Mark Walter as controlling owner and included Magic Johnson, Peter Guber, Todd Boehly, Bobby Patton and the executive Stan Kasten, who became team president.

On August 25, 2012, the new owners acquired Adrián González, Josh Beckett, Carl Crawford and Nick Punto from Boston in a nine-player trade, the largest in franchise history.

=== 2013–present: The Guggenheim era ===
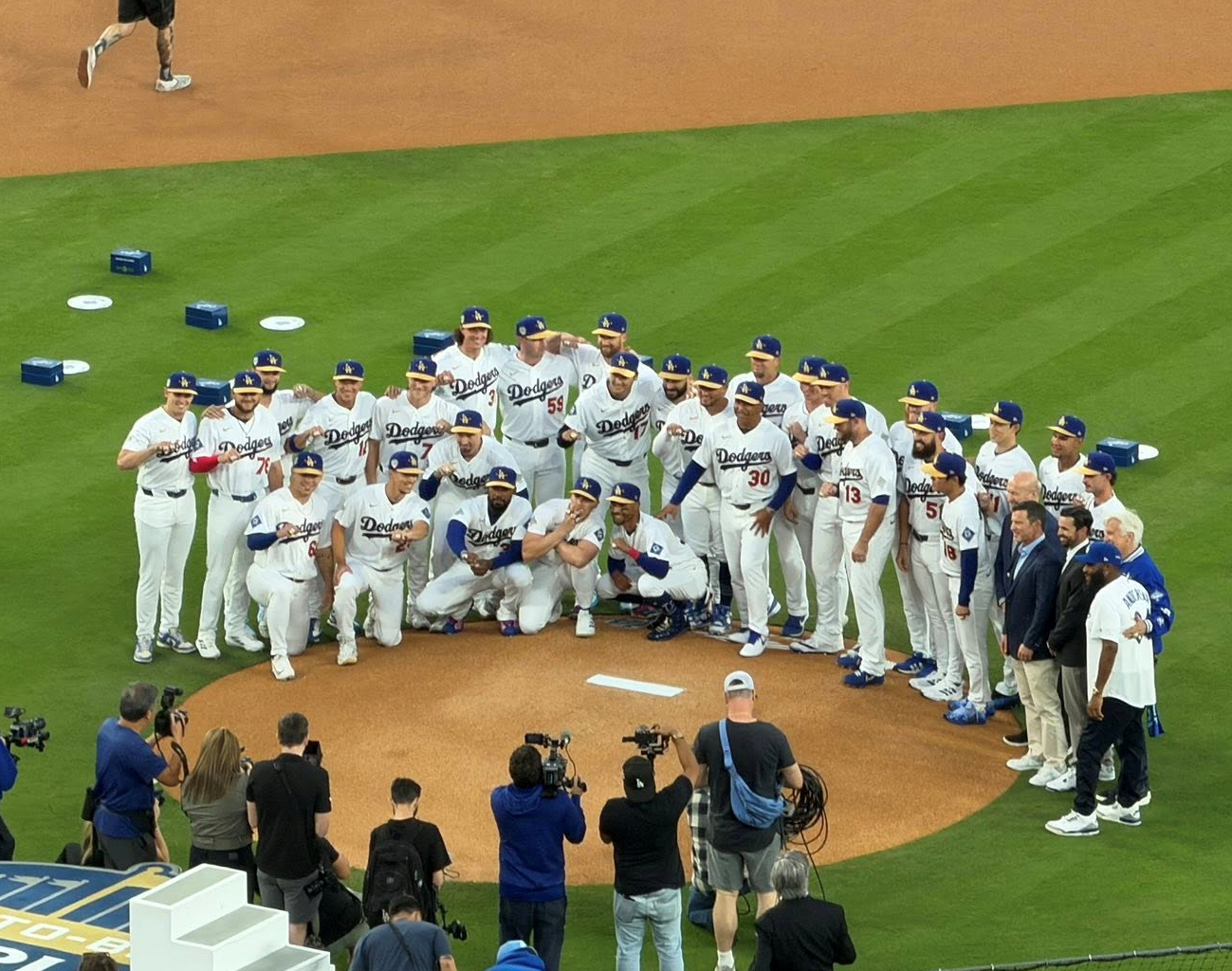
The Dodgers receive their 2025 World Series rings in March 2026

The Dodgers have reached the postseason in every season since 2013. They lost the National League Championship Series to the St. Louis Cardinals in 2013 and the Chicago Cubs in 2016. Their next pennant came in 2017, aided by a Justin Turner walk-off home run, 29 years to the day after Gibson's. They lost the Series in seven games to the Houston Astros, which would later be revealed to have been stealing signs. The Dodgers repeated as pennant-winners in 2018 but lost the Series to the Boston Red Sox in five games; Game 3 lasted 18 innings and seven hours and 20 minutes, the longest game in World Series and postseason history.

In 2020, in a season shortened to 60 games by the COVID-19 pandemic, the Dodgers scored 11 runs in one inning of Game 3 of the National League Championship Series against the Atlanta Braves, the most in any inning of a postseason game. They won the pennant and beat the Tampa Bay Rays in six games for their first World Series title since 1988.

Before the 2024 season the Dodgers signed Shohei Ohtani to a 10-year, $700 million contract. They returned to the World Series that October, where Freddie Freeman won Game 1 with a walk-off grand slam, the first in World Series history. The Dodgers came back from a five-run deficit in Game 5 to beat the New York Yankees in five games for their eighth title, and Freeman was named the series' most valuable player.

The Dodgers repeated in 2025, beating the Toronto Blue Jays in seven games. Miguel Rojas tied Game 7 with a home run in the ninth inning, the first game-tying home run in the ninth inning or later of a World Series Game 7 in major league history. It was the first back-to-back title in 25 years; no team had repeated since the Yankees won three in a row from 1998 to 2000. In 2026, the Dodgers clinched a postseason berth on September 14, their 14th consecutive appearance, matching the major league record set by the Atlanta Braves. (Note: The Braves reached the postseason in 14 consecutive seasons in which a postseason was held, from 1991 to 2005; there was no postseason in 1994 because of the players' strike.) They finished the regular season 100–62, first in the National League West. However, after they were swept in the NLCS by the Milwaukee Brewers, whom they swept in the previous year's series, they failed to become the first team to three-peat as World Series champions since the 2000 New York Yankees.

The ownership group has expanded since acquiring the team, adding Billie Jean King and Ilana Kloss in 2018 and the businessmen Alan Smolinisky and Robert L. Plummer in September 2019. The franchise's estimated value has risen sharply under Guggenheim ownership. Forbes valued the club at $6.8 billion in 2025 and $7.8 billion in 2026, while Sportico estimated its value at $9.05 billion in 2026. Both ranked the Dodgers second among Major League Baseball franchises, behind the New York Yankees.

== Nicknames ==
The name "Dodgers" refers to the electric trolley lines that spread across Brooklyn in the 1890s. Tracks converged outside Eastern Park, and fans walking to the ground had to dodge them; Brooklyn residents were being called trolley dodgers before the name attached to the club.

By the end of 1895, electric trolley accidents in Brooklyn had killed more than 130 people.

Sportswriters started using the name "Trolley Dodgers" to refer to the Brooklyn team early in the 1895 season. The name was shortened to, on occasion, the "Brooklyn Dodgers" as early as 1898.

Fans and sportswriters also called the team the "Bums". Asked by a cab driver how "our bums" had done that day, the newspaper cartoonist Willard Mullin drew "Dem Bums" as an unkempt version of the circus clown Emmett Kelly's hobo character "Weary Willie"; the drawing ran on the cover of the 1955 Dodgers yearbook, and Kelly was hired to entertain crowds at Ebbets Field in 1957.

Other team names used by the franchise were the Atlantics, Grays, Grooms, Bridegrooms, Superbas, and Robins: the Bridegrooms in the club's earliest years, the Superbas around the turn of the century, and the Robins thereafter, after the Hall of Fame manager Wilbert Robinson, who led the team from 1914 to 1931. All of these nicknames were used by fans and sportswriters to describe the team, but not in any official capacity. However, the Trolley Dodger nickname was used throughout this period, simultaneously with these other nicknames, by fans and sportswriters of the day. The team did not use the name in any formal sense until 1932 when the word "Dodgers" appeared on team jerseys. That year the club allowed the Brooklyn baseball writers to select a permanent name, and on January 22, 1932, the writers chose Dodgers; the only other nickname seriously considered was Kings. The "conclusive shift" came in 1933, when both home and road jerseys for the team bore the name "Dodgers".

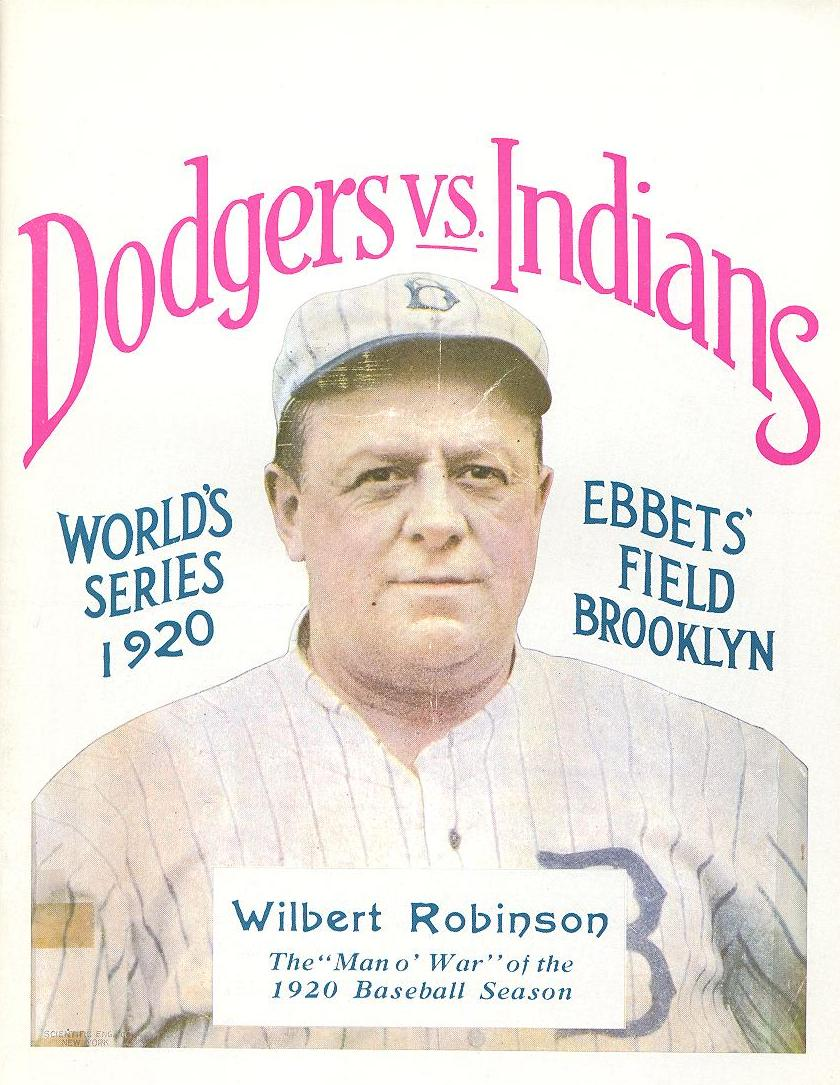
The program for the 1920 World Series at Ebbets Field billed the matchup as "Dodgers vs. Indians", though the club was commonly called the Robins at the time

Contemporary sources used the names interchangeably. A New York Times report on a game in September 1916 referred to the club as both the Dodgers and the Superbas, though statisticians and historians now generally call that year's pennant winners the Robins. The program issued at Ebbets Field for the 1920 World Series billed the matchup as "Dodgers vs. Indians", although the Robins name had by then been in common use for six years.

== Uniforms ==
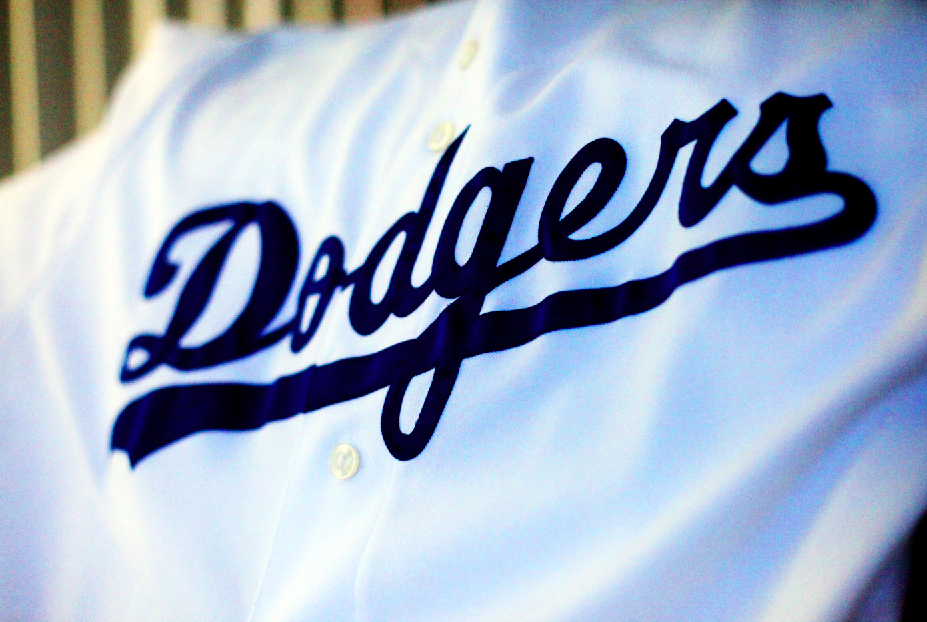
The Dodgers' home uniform has remained relatively unchanged since the 1930s.

The Dodgers' uniform has remained relatively unchanged since the 1930s. The home jersey is white with "Dodgers" written in script across the chest in royal blue. The road jersey is gray with "Los Angeles" written in script across the chest in royal blue. The word "Dodgers" was first used on the front of the team's home jersey in 1933; the uniform was then white with red pinstripes and a stylized "B" on the left shoulder. The Dodgers also wore green outlined uniforms and green caps throughout the 1937 season but reverted to blue the following year.

The Dodgers current script on a Dodger Blue background

The current design was created in 1939. Originally intended for the 1951 World Series for which the ballclub failed to qualify, red numbers under the "Dodgers" script were added to the home uniform in 1952. The road jersey also has a red uniform number under the script. When the franchise moved from Brooklyn to Los Angeles, the city name on the road jersey changed, and the stylized "B" was replaced with the interlocking "LA" on the caps in 1958. In 1970, the Dodgers removed the city name from the road jerseys and had "Dodgers" on both the home and away uniforms. The city script returned to the road jerseys in 1999, and the club introduced an alternate uniform for the first time since 1944 (when all-blue satin uniforms were introduced). These 1999 alternate jerseys had a royal top with the "Dodgers" script in white across the chest, and the red number on the front. These were worn with white pants and a new cap with a silver brim, a top button, and a Dodger logo. The team abandoned them after one season. Blue jerseys later returned as spring training tops. In 2014, the Dodgers introduced an alternate road jersey: a gray version with the "Dodgers" script instead of the city name. In 2018, the Dodgers wore their 60th anniversary patch to honor the 60 years of being in Los Angeles.

In 2021, the Dodgers again unveiled a blue alternate uniform, this time as part of the "City Connect" series in collaboration with Nike. This uniform was similar to the blue alternates they wore in 1999, but with the script "Los Dodgers" in homage to Los Angeles' Latino community. The Dodgers wore a matching blue cap with the "Los Dodgers" script.

Midway through the 2024 season, the Dodgers unveiled their second "City Connect" uniform. The cream-based uniform paid homage to the city of Los Angeles and various chapters of the city's history that are connected to the team. The "Los Angeles" wordmark was inspired by the signage of the Dodgers' original home of Los Angeles Memorial Coliseum, and the number font by the mid-century typefaces that were popular during the team's early years in Los Angeles. The cobalt blue cap featured the "interlocking LA" and script "D" from the "Dodgers" logo merged to form the LAD team code; the logo also appears as a sleeve patch. Above the manufacturer's tag is the hashtag #ITFDB, a reference to broadcaster Vin Scully's catchphrase "It's time for Dodger baseball!".

On April 2, 2026, the Dodgers unveiled a blue road alternate uniform, similar in makeup to their alternate gray "Los Angeles" script uniform. The sleeve patch contains the "Dodgers" script along with gray piping, and red chest numbers were outlined in gray to improve visibility. It was the first time the Dodgers wore a blue jersey as part of their regular road rotation; the club had previously worn blue jerseys in spring training and in its "City Connect" alternates.

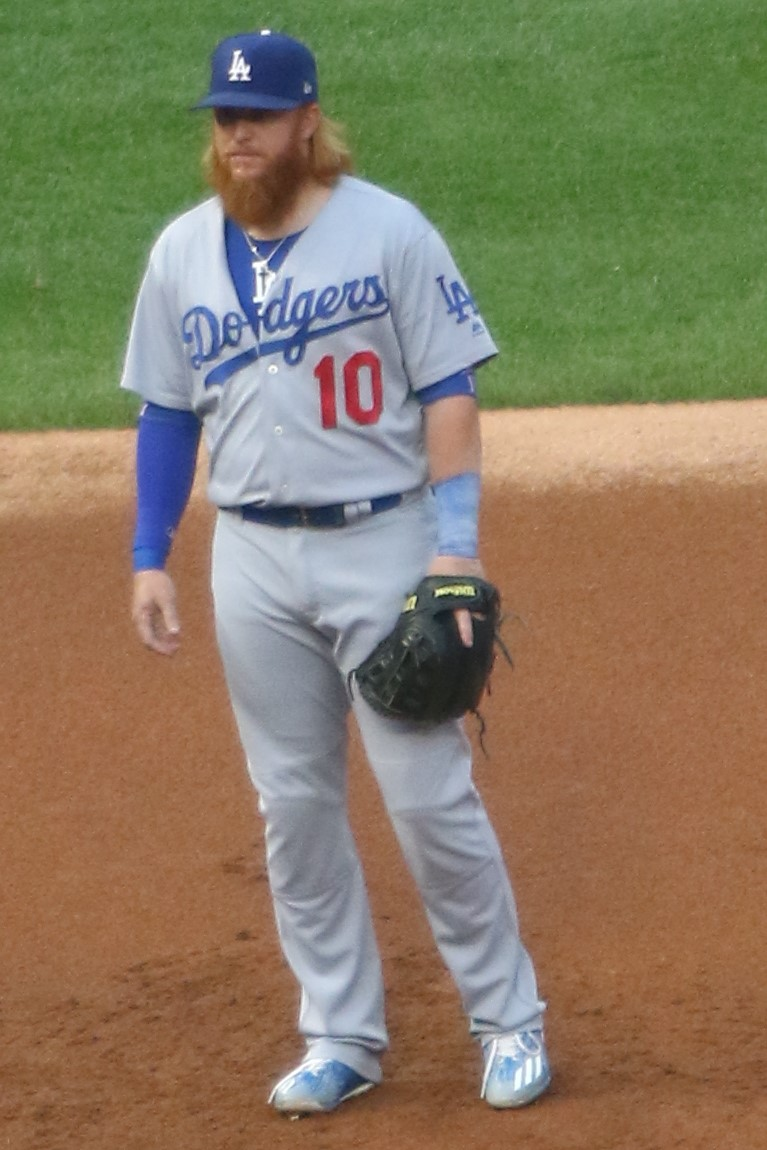
Justin Turner wearing the Dodgers' primary road uniform

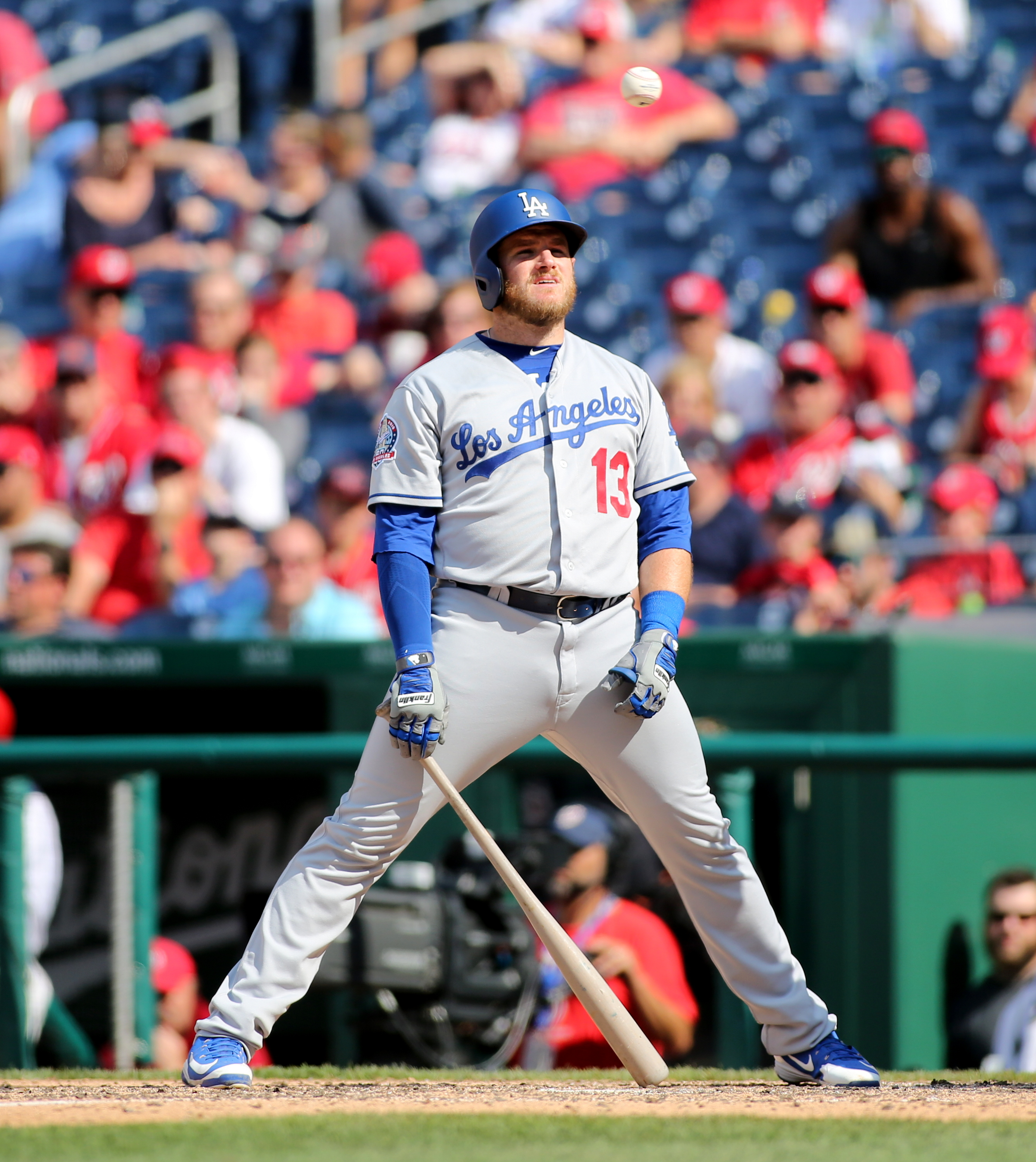
Max Muncy wearing the Dodgers' alternate road uniform

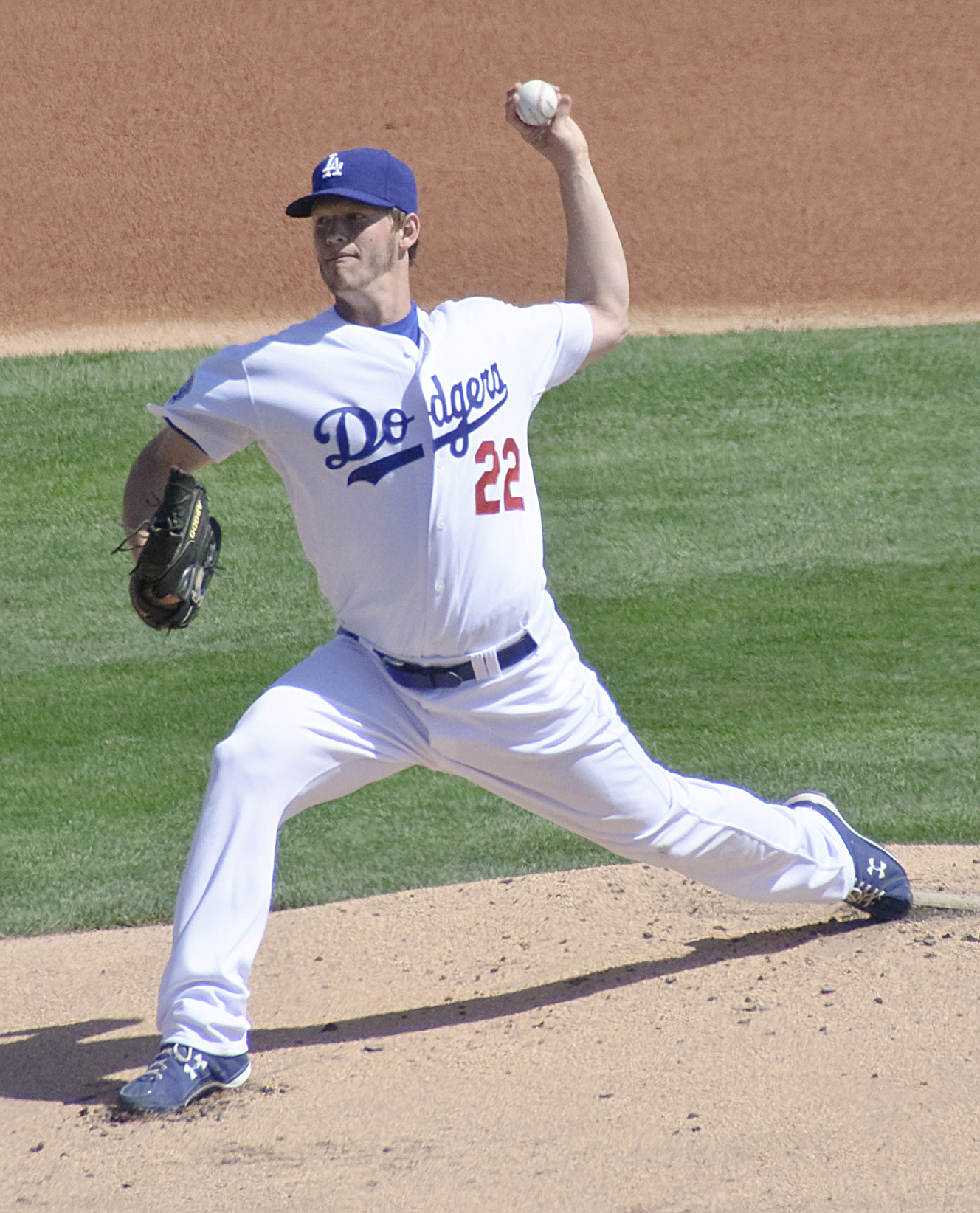
Clayton Kershaw wearing the Dodgers' home uniform

== World Series appearances ==
In Brooklyn, the Dodgers won the NL pennant 12 times (1890, 1899, 1900, 1916, 1920, 1941, 1947, 1949, 1952, 1953, 1955, 1956). After moving to Los Angeles, the team won National League pennants in 1959, 1963, 1965, 1966, 1974, 1977, 1978, 1981, 1988, 2017, 2018, 2020, 2024, and 2025.

The Dodgers have appeared in 23 World Series and won nine. The franchise lost its first seven appearances before winning the 1955 World Series against the New York Yankees, its only championship while based in Brooklyn. Since moving to Los Angeles in 1958 the club has appeared in 14 World Series and won eight, most recently in 2025. Twelve of the 23 appearances have come against the Yankees.

Season	Team	Manager	Opponent	Result	Record
1916	Brooklyn Robins	Wilbert Robinson	Boston Red Sox	Lost 1–4	94–60
1920	Brooklyn Robins	Wilbert Robinson	Cleveland Indians	Lost 2–5 (Note: The World Series was a best-of-nine series from 1919 to 1921.)	93–61
1941	Brooklyn Dodgers	Leo Durocher	New York Yankees	Lost 1–4	100–54
1947	Brooklyn Dodgers	Burt Shotton	New York Yankees	Lost 3–4	94–60
1949	Brooklyn Dodgers	Burt Shotton	New York Yankees	Lost 1–4	97–57
1952	Brooklyn Dodgers	Chuck Dressen	New York Yankees	Lost 3–4	96–57
1953	Brooklyn Dodgers	Chuck Dressen	New York Yankees	Lost 2–4	105–49
1955	Brooklyn Dodgers	Walter Alston	New York Yankees	Won 4–3	98–55
1956	Brooklyn Dodgers	Walter Alston	New York Yankees	Lost 3–4	93–61
1959	Los Angeles Dodgers	Walter Alston	Chicago White Sox	Won 4–2	88–68 (Note: The Dodgers and the Milwaukee Braves finished the regular season tied at 86–68. The Dodgers won the pennant by sweeping a best-of-three tie-breaker series; those two games are counted in the season record here, as they are by Baseball Reference.)
1963	Los Angeles Dodgers	Walter Alston	New York Yankees	Won 4–0	99–63
1965	Los Angeles Dodgers	Walter Alston	Minnesota Twins	Won 4–3	97–65
1966	Los Angeles Dodgers	Walter Alston	Baltimore Orioles	Lost 0–4	95–67
1974	Los Angeles Dodgers	Walter Alston	Oakland Athletics	Lost 1–4	102–60
1977	Los Angeles Dodgers	Tommy Lasorda	New York Yankees	Lost 2–4	98–64
1978	Los Angeles Dodgers	Tommy Lasorda	New York Yankees	Lost 2–4	95–67
1981	Los Angeles Dodgers	Tommy Lasorda	New York Yankees	Won 4–2	63–47 (Note: The 1981 season was split in two by a players' strike. The Dodgers went 36–21 in the first half and 27–26 in the second.)
1988	Los Angeles Dodgers	Tommy Lasorda	Oakland Athletics	Won 4–1	94–67
2017	Los Angeles Dodgers	Dave Roberts	Houston Astros	Lost 3–4	104–58
2018	Los Angeles Dodgers	Dave Roberts	Boston Red Sox	Lost 1–4	92–71
2020	Los Angeles Dodgers	Dave Roberts	Tampa Bay Rays	Won 4–2	43–17 (Note: The 2020 season was shortened to 60 games because of the COVID-19 pandemic.)
2024	Los Angeles Dodgers	Dave Roberts	New York Yankees	Won 4–1	98–64
2025	Los Angeles Dodgers	Dave Roberts	Toronto Blue Jays	Won 4–3	93–69
Totals	23 appearances			9–14	

== Ballparks ==
The franchise played in a series of Brooklyn grounds before moving into Ebbets Field in 1913, where it remained through the 1957 season. After relocating to Los Angeles, the club spent four seasons at the Los Angeles Memorial Coliseum and has played at Dodger Stadium since 1962.

=== Brooklyn ballparks ===
The club played at Washington Park in South Brooklyn from its founding in 1883. (Note: Two ballparks called Washington Park stood on separate sites: the club's original home, and the replacement Charles Ebbets built across the street for the 1898 season. Sources number them inconsistently, because a fire destroyed the original in May 1889 and the rebuilt grounds are sometimes counted as a ballpark in their own right; on that reckoning the 1898 park is the third of the name rather than the second. They are distinguished here by date.) Because blue laws in Brooklyn and New York barred professional baseball on Sundays, the club also staged Sunday home games in Queens, where the statutes were enforced loosely. It used Grauer's Ridgewood Park in 1886 and then, for three seasons from 1887, Wallace's Ridgewood Park nearby. Sunday attendance at Wallace's ground averaged 7,153 in 1887, against 2,857 at Washington Park.

Following the 1890 consolidation of the club with Brooklyn's Players' League entry, the team played at Eastern Park in East New York from 1891 to 1897. The site was distant from Brooklyn's population center, and attendance fell short of what Washington Park had drawn. Club president Charles Ebbets returned the team to a new Washington Park in 1898.

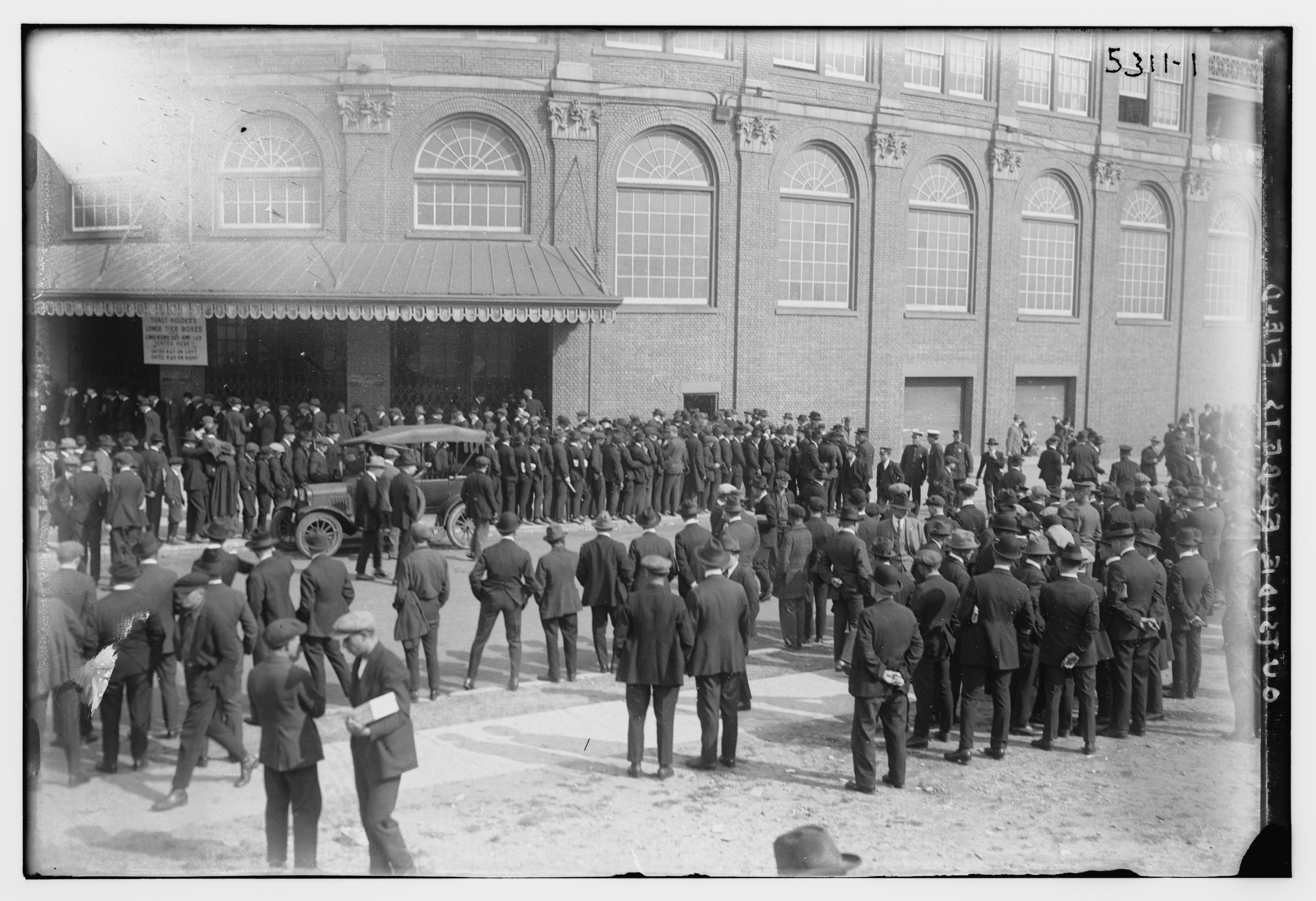
Crowds outside Ebbets Field in 1920

By late 1911, Washington Park was no longer adequate, and in January 1912 Ebbets announced a replacement on 5.7 acres in the Flatbush section, on a site previously used as a garbage dump and known as Pigtown. Ebbets Field opened in April 1913 with seating for about 24,000. An expansion begun in 1931 raised capacity to a peak of 35,000 in 1937; it stood just under 32,000 in the ballpark's final season.

The Dodgers played seven home games at Roosevelt Stadium in Jersey City in each of 1956 and 1957, at a rent of $10,000 a year. Walter O'Malley sold Ebbets Field to the developer Marvin Kratter for $3 million in October 1956. The Dodgers played their final game there on September 24, 1957, before a crowd of 6,702, and the ballpark was demolished in 1960.

=== Los Angeles Memorial Coliseum ===
The Dodgers played at the Los Angeles Memorial Coliseum from 1958 to 1961. With seating for more than 90,000, it was the largest ballpark to regularly host major league games. Its baseball configuration placed the left-field foul line 250 feet from home plate and left-center field 320 feet away; a 40-foot screen was erected on the left-field wall to reduce home runs. The first regular-season game there, on April 18, 1958, drew 78,672, at the time a major league record for a single game and a home-opener record that stood until the Colorado Rockies drew 80,227 in 1993. An exhibition game against the New York Yankees on May 7, 1959, held to benefit Roy Campanella, the former Brooklyn catcher disabled in an automobile accident, drew 93,103, a United States record at the time for any organized baseball game. Game Five of the 1959 World Series drew 92,706.

=== Dodger Stadium ===
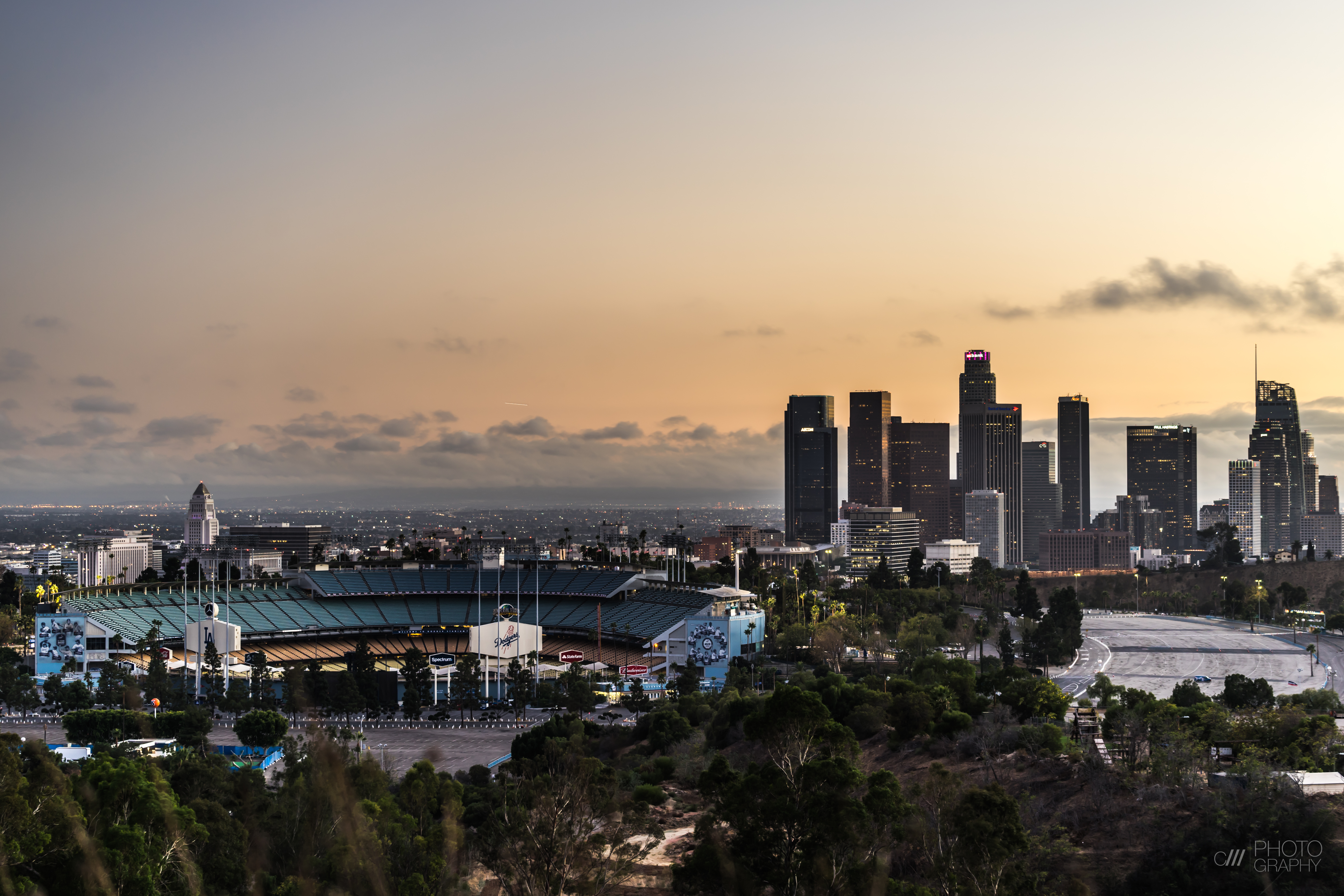
Dodger Stadium in 2016, with downtown Los Angeles in the background

Dodger Stadium opened on April 10, 1962. Ground was broken on September 17, 1959, and O'Malley financed the construction privately for $23 million, making it the first privately financed major league ballpark since Yankee Stadium in 1923.

The stadium's listed capacity has been 56,000 since it opened. Andy McCue has attributed that figure to the conditional-use permit issued by the city, which required 16,000 parking spaces at a ratio of 3.5 people per space, rather than to a count of seats; a 1962 survey put the number of seats at 55,792.

On March 25, 2026, the eve of Opening Day, the Dodgers announced a partnership with the Japanese retailer Uniqlo under which the company acquired the naming rights to the ballpark's playing field, which became UNIQLO Field at Dodger Stadium. It was the first naming rights agreement in the ballpark's history, and the stadium's own name did not change.

==== Chavez Ravine ====
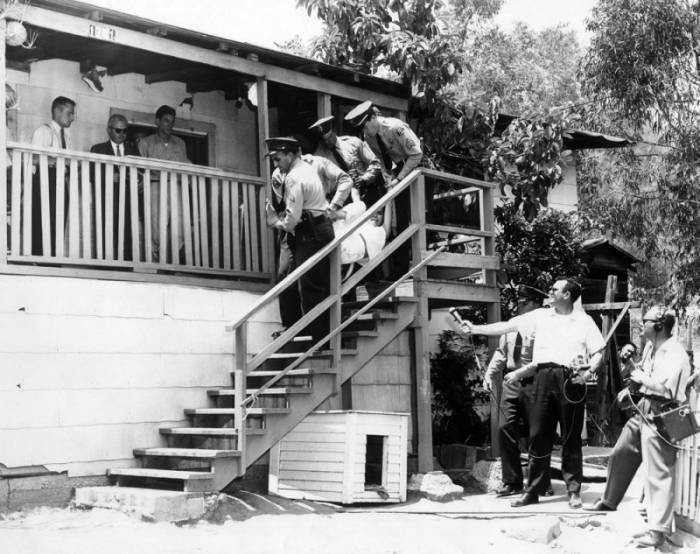
Los Angeles County sheriff's deputies remove a resident from her home in Chavez Ravine in 1959

The stadium stands on land in Chavez Ravine that had been occupied by three neighborhoods: La Loma, Palo Verde, and Bishop. In 1950, Los Angeles authorities used federal money made available under the Housing Act of 1949 to acquire the land for a public housing project, Elysian Park Heights. The project was abandoned after the planner Frank Wilkinson was dismissed in 1952 during anti-Communist investigations and Norris Poulson was elected mayor on a platform opposing public housing; his administration bought the land back from the federal government.

The city council approved transferring the land to the Dodgers in 1957. Opponents forced a public referendum, held on June 3, 1958, at which the attempt to block the transfer was defeated by about 25,000 votes out of roughly 677,000 cast. O'Malley acquired the site in part by transferring Wrigley Field, the club's minor league ballpark in Los Angeles, to the city. The last residents of Chavez Ravine were evicted on May 9, 1959.

=== Spring training ===
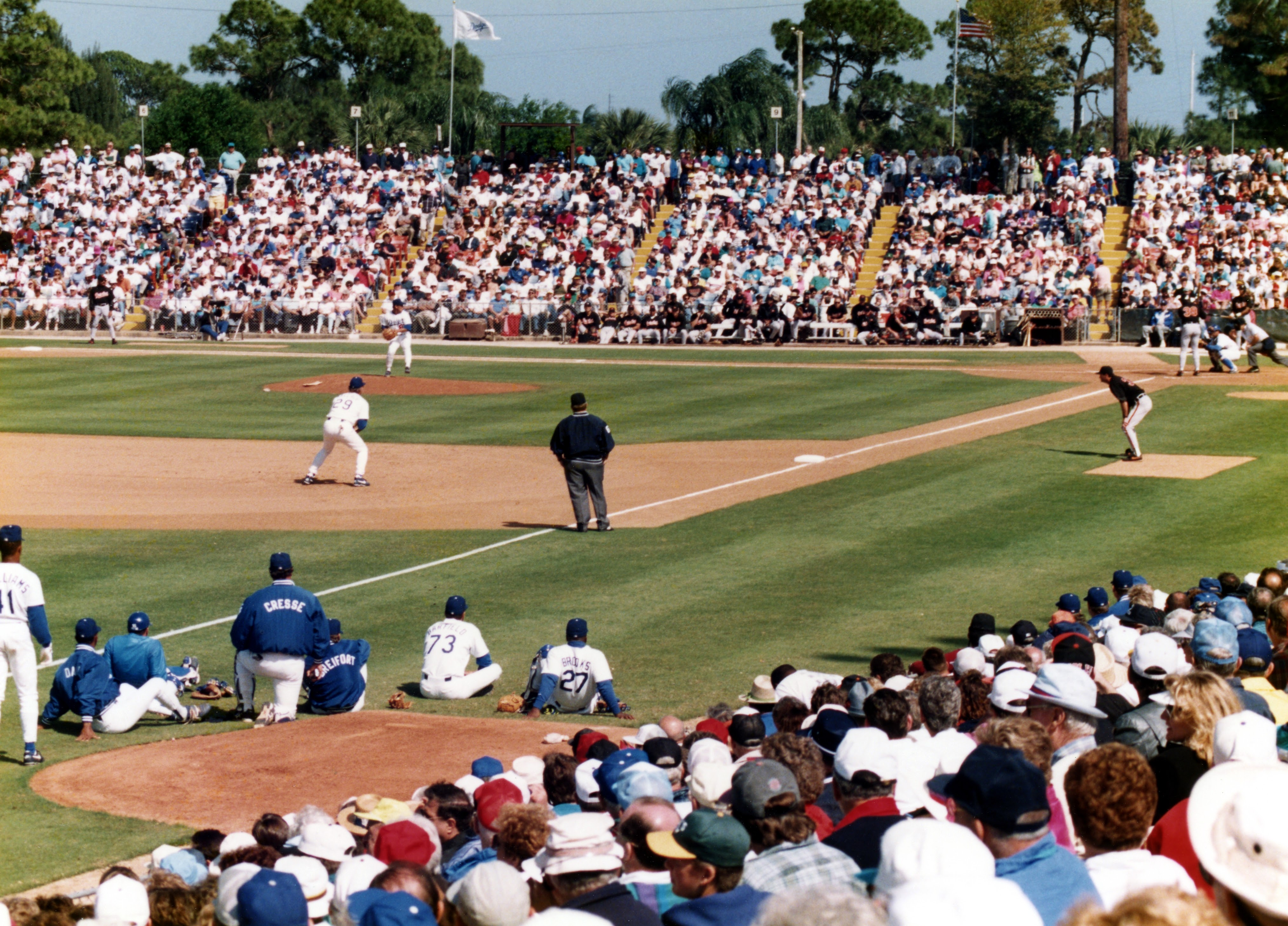
Spring training at Holman Stadium, Dodgertown, in 1994

The Dodgers trained at Vero Beach, Florida, from 1948 to 2008, converting a former naval air station into a self-contained complex known as Dodgertown. Branch Rickey had held the club's two previous camps outside the United States, in Havana in 1947 and Ciudad Trujillo in 1948, because Jackie Robinson and other African American players had been placed in segregated housing at the team's earlier training sites. At Vero Beach the players lived, ate and trained on the site, and Dodgertown became the first fully integrated Major League Baseball spring training site in the South.

Segregation persisted outside the complex. Maury Wills said that black players had difficulty finding a barber who would cut their hair in Vero Beach, and that he spent eight and a half seasons as a minor leaguer and three more with the major league club before he was permitted to move into the major league sleeping quarters.

Walter O'Malley and the city agreed to a 21-year lease in 1952 at a rent of one dollar a year plus the proceeds of one exhibition game, which O'Malley settled by handing a city official $21 in cash. The lease gave him the confidence to build a stadium of just under 5,000 seats, named for Dodgers director Bud Holman, which opened in 1953. Holman Stadium remains one of the oldest spring training venues still in use.

The Dodgers kept the site after the franchise moved to Los Angeles in 1958. They played their final game at Vero Beach on March 17, 2008, and moved to Camelback Ranch in Arizona for the 2009 season, sharing the complex with the Chicago White Sox. Dodgertown was designated a Florida Heritage Landmark in 2014, and in 2019 it was added to the U.S. Civil Rights Trail, the only sports venue on the trail.

== Rivalries ==
The Dodgers' rivalry with the San Francisco Giants dates to the 19th century when the two teams were based in New York; the rivalry with the New York Yankees took place when the Dodgers were based in New York, but was revived with their East Coast/West Coast World Series battles in 1963, 1977, 1978, and 1981.

The Dodgers also had a rivalry with the Cincinnati Reds during the 1970s, 1980s and early 1990s. The Dodgers and the Arizona Diamondbacks were divisional rivals through most of the 2010s. Their intra-city rivalry with the Los Angeles Angels dates back to the Angels' inaugural season in 1961. The Dodgers' rivalry with the San Diego Padres dates back to the Padres' inaugural season in 1969.

=== Divisional ===
The Giants, Padres and Diamondbacks are the Dodgers' opponents in the National League West.

==== San Francisco Giants ====
The Dodgers–Giants rivalry began in the late 19th century, when both clubs were based in New York City, with the Dodgers playing in Brooklyn and the Giants at the Polo Grounds in Manhattan. After the 1957 season, Dodgers owner Walter O'Malley moved the team to Los Angeles for financial and other reasons. Giants owner Horace Stoneham—who was considering moving his team to Minnesota—brought his club to San Francisco, preserving the rivalry on the West Coast, and the two clubs met on the West Coast for the first time in April 1958. New York baseball fans were stunned and heartbroken by the move.

The rivalry has been ranked among the greatest in American sport: ESPN included it in a list of the ten greatest rivalries in any sport, and Forbes included it in a survey of baseball's most intense rivalries. Writers have pointed to its endurance across more than a century and to its survival of both clubs' move across the continent.

Neither club has been dominant for long. Through the 2026 season the Dodgers led the all-time regular-season series 1,296–1,292, a margin of four games in 2,588. The Dodgers have won 26 National League pennants to the Giants' 23, and nine World Series titles to the Giants' eight. The balance shifted with the move to California: the Giants won five championships to the Dodgers' one while both were in New York, and the Dodgers have won eight to the Giants' three since, the Giants' first coming in the 2010 World Series and the Dodgers' most recent in the 2025 World Series.

In 2021, the Dodgers and Giants both finished the regular season with over 100 wins, with the latter clinching the division with a record of 107–55. The Dodgers were one game behind with a record of 106–56, relegating them to the NL Wild Card Game, in which they defeated the St. Louis Cardinals. This resulted in the first postseason matchup between the Dodgers and Giants in the NLDS. Their 213 combined regular-season wins were the most in any postseason series to that point. The Dodgers ultimately won in the decisive Game 5, but would lose in the NLCS to the eventual World Series champions: Atlanta Braves.

==== San Diego Padres ====
The Padres' rivalry with the Dodgers has often been lopsided in favor of Los Angeles; however, the clubs' growing competitiveness in the 2020s has added intensity on top of proximity between Los Angeles and San Diego.

Through the 2026 season the Dodgers led the all-time regular-season series 540–436, and the teams have met three times in the playoffs. The Dodgers swept the Padres in the 2020 NLDS, won in five games in the 2024 NLDS, and the Padres won in four games in the 2022 NLDS.

==== Arizona Diamondbacks ====
Animosity between the Dodgers and the Diamondbacks has produced incidents of pitchers throwing at opposing batters. In a 2013 game at Dodger Stadium both benches cleared twice and six people were ejected after Ian Kennedy hit Yasiel Puig and Zack Greinke in turn. Through the 2026 season the Dodgers led the all-time regular-season series 279–212.

After eliminating the Diamondbacks and clinching the division on September 19, 2013, multiple Dodgers players celebrated the win by jumping into the pool at Chase Field. On December 8, 2015, Zack Greinke signed a six-year, $206.5 million contract with the Diamondbacks in free agency. Both teams met during the 2017 National League Division Series; the Diamondbacks were swept 3–0 by the Dodgers en route to their appearance in the World Series. The teams rematched in the 2023 National League Division Series, with the Diamondbacks returning the favor with a 3–0 sweep of their own as they eventually reached the World Series.

=== National League ===
The Reds were the Dodgers' divisional rivals from 1969 until realignment moved them to the NL Central in 1994.

==== Cincinnati Reds ====
The Dodgers and Reds were among the strongest teams in the National League in the years after the 1969 realignment. They often competed for the NL West division title. From 1970 to 1990, they had eleven 1–2 finishes in the standings, with seven of them being within 5½ games or fewer. Both teams also played in numerous championships during this span, combining to win 10 NL Pennants and 5 World Series titles from 1970–1990, most notably as the Big Red Machine teams clashed frequently with the Tommy Lasorda-era Dodgers teams. Reds manager Sparky Anderson once said, "I don't think there's a rivalry like ours in either league. The Giants are supposed to be the Dodgers' natural rivals, but I don't think the feeling is there anymore. It's not there the way it is with us and the Dodgers." The clubs have met twice in the postseason since 1994: the Reds won the 1995 NLDS in three games, and the Dodgers won the 2025 NL Wild Card Series in two on the way to the World Series title. Through the 2026 season the Dodgers led the all-time regular-season series 1,217–1,165.

=== American League ===
The Angels and Yankees are American League clubs. The Dodgers meet them during the regular season in interleague play, and have faced the Yankees in the World Series.

==== Los Angeles Angels ====
The Dodgers' meetings with the Los Angeles Angels are known as the Freeway Series. The name comes from the freeway system in the greater Los Angeles metropolitan area, the home of both teams; one could travel from one team's stadium to the other simply by traveling along Interstate 5. The term is akin to Subway Series, a term for meetings between New York City baseball teams. The term Freeway Series also inspired the official name of the region's NHL rivalry: the Freeway Face-Off. The clubs have met only in interleague play, and through the 2026 season the Angels led the series 82–78.

Animosity between the team's fanbases grew in 2005, when the Angels' new team owner Arte Moreno changed the name of his ball club from the 'Anaheim Angels', to the 'Los Angeles Angels of Anaheim'. Since the city of Anaheim is roughly 30 miles from Downtown Los Angeles, the Angels franchise was ridiculed throughout the league for the contradictory name. The city of Anaheim sued the Angels for breach of their stadium lease, and Dodgers owner Frank McCourt said that "true Angelenos really know who their team is, and they bleed Dodger blue", though he added that the Dodgers had no plans to join the suit. The club instead sold merchandise reading "The Los Angeles Dodgers of Los Angeles" and trademarked the phrase.

==== New York Yankees ====
The Dodgers and the Yankees have met 12 times in the World Series, more than any other two teams from the American and National Leagues. The rivalry began when the Dodgers played in Brooklyn, and the two teams faced each other in seven Subway Series in the 1940s and 1950s.

After the Dodgers moved to Los Angeles in 1958, the rivalry continued as the teams represented two of the largest cities on each coast of the United States.

Although the rivalry's significance arose from the two teams' numerous World Series meetings, the Yankees and Dodgers did not meet in the World Series between 1981 and 2024. They did not play each other again in a non-exhibition game until 2004, when they played a three-game interleague series. Nevertheless, games between the two teams have drawn sellout crowds. Regular-season meetings remain rare: through the 2026 season the teams had played 28 times outside the World Series, the Dodgers leading 15–13.

== Fan support ==
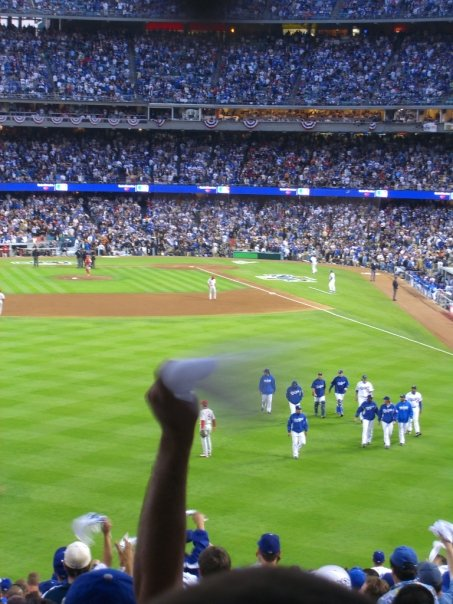
A fan waves a rally towel during the 2008 National League Championship Series (NLCS).

Attendance rose from eleventh in MLB during the Dodgers' final season in Brooklyn to second in their first season in Los Angeles. In 1962, the first season at Dodger Stadium, the club drew 2,755,184 spectators, the most in the major leagues and nearly double the New York Yankees' total.

=== Attendance records ===
In 1978 the Dodgers became the first MLB team to attract more than three million fans in a season, and repeated the feat six more times before any other franchise reached three million fans overall. The Dodgers drew at least three million fans in ten consecutive seasons from 2001 to 2010. The team's largest fan club, Pantone 294 (a reference to the Pantone code of Dodger blue), regularly travels to away games to cheer for the Dodgers. The Dodgers have led the major leagues in attendance every season since 2013, excluding the shortened 2020 season, and in 2025 drew 4,012,470 fans, the first season total above four million in franchise history. In 2026 they drew 4,034,219, a franchise record.

On July 3, 2007, Dodgers management announced that total franchise attendance, dating back to 1901, had reached 175 million, a record for all professional sports. On March 29, 2008, the Dodgers set the world record for the largest attendance for a single baseball game during an exhibition game against the Boston Red Sox at the Los Angeles Memorial Coliseum in honor of the Dodgers' 50th anniversary, with 115,300 fans in attendance. In 2009, the Dodgers led MLB in total attendance. The Dodgers cap ranked second or third in annual sales in each year from 2002 to 2008.

Primarily, Dodgers fans originate from most of southern or central California and also parts of southern Nevada. The fanbase has also extended out to states across the southwest such as Arizona, New Mexico and even western Texas.

Hollywood figures have turned out for the club since its first game in Los Angeles. Covering that game at the Los Angeles Memorial Coliseum on April 18, 1958, the Los Angeles Times described the seats between first and third base as holding "probably the largest seated 'Who's Who' galaxy ever to crowd into a single stadium", among them Groucho Marx, Burt Lancaster, Jack Lemmon, Nat King Cole, Gene Autry and the director Alfred Hitchcock. The club has kept that following. The Hollywood Reporter counts Jason Bateman, Will Ferrell, Flea and Rob Lowe among its longtime celebrity supporters, ESPN has profiled the actor Bryan Cranston as a lifelong fan, and celebrity attendance at postseason games draws regular coverage in the entertainment press.

Home attendance at Dodger Stadium
Year	MLB rank	Total attendance	Game average
2004	2nd	3,488,283	43,065
2005	2nd	3,603,646	44,489
2006	2nd	3,758,545	46,402
2007	2nd	3,857,036	47,618
2008	3rd	3,730,553	46,056
2009	1st	3,761,655	46,440
2010	3rd	3,562,320	43,979
2011	11th	2,935,139	36,236
2012	5th	3,324,246	41,040
2013	1st	3,743,527	46,216
2014	1st	3,782,337	46,696
2015	1st	3,764,815	46,479
2016	1st	3,703,312	45,720
2017	1st	3,765,856	46,492
2018	1st	3,857,500	47,043
2019	1st	3,974,309	49,066
2020	N/A	0 (Note: No fans were allowed at games during the 2020 Major League Baseball regular season due to the COVID-19 pandemic.)	N/A
2021	1st	2,804,693 (Note: Dodger Stadium operated at 33% capacity from April to June 15 due to the COVID-19 pandemic.)	34,626
2022	1st	3,861,408	47,672
2023	1st	3,837,079	47,371
2024	1st	3,941,251	48,657
2025	1st	4,012,470	49,537
2026	1st	4,034,219	49,805

== International ==
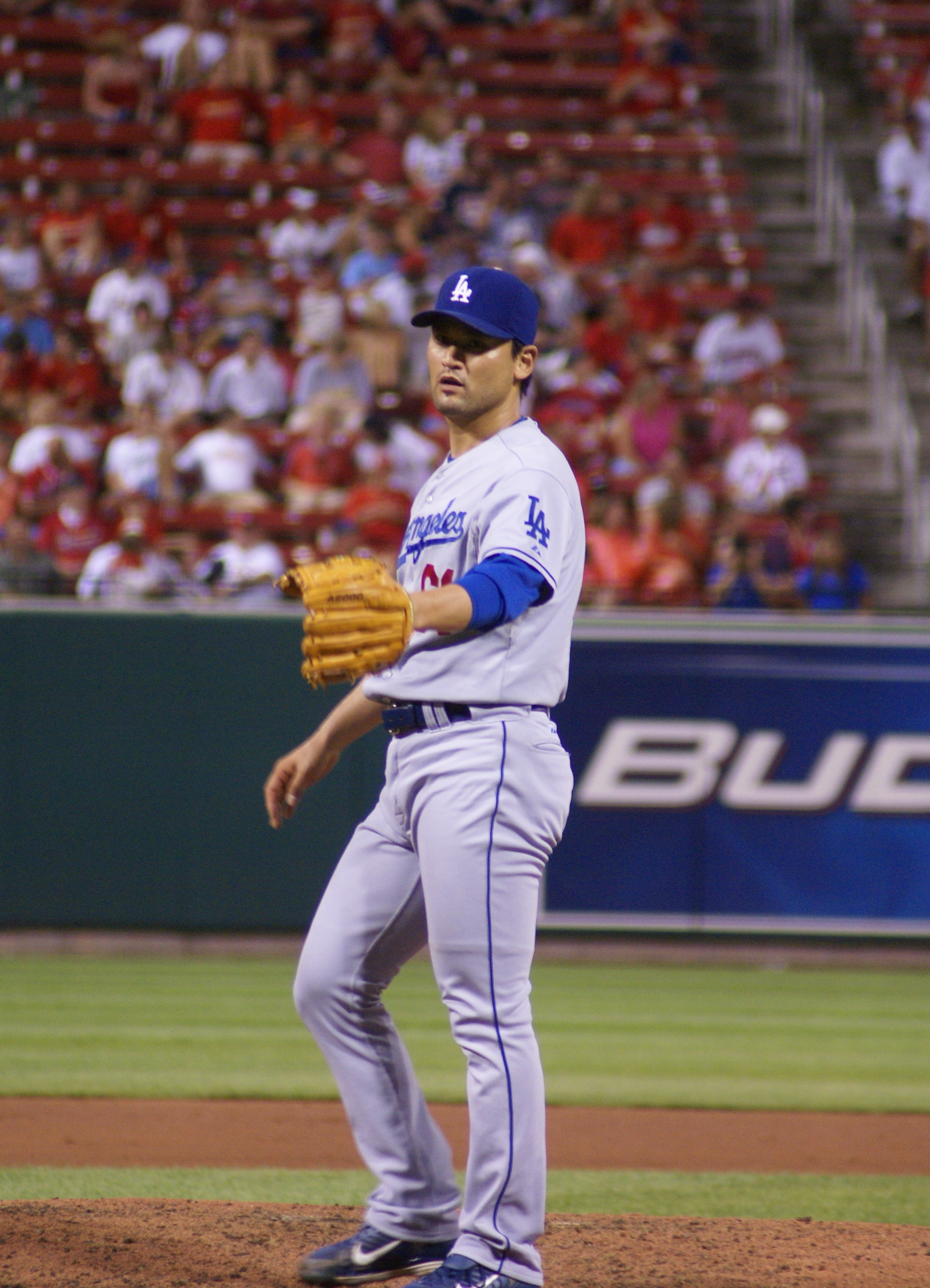
Chan Ho Park

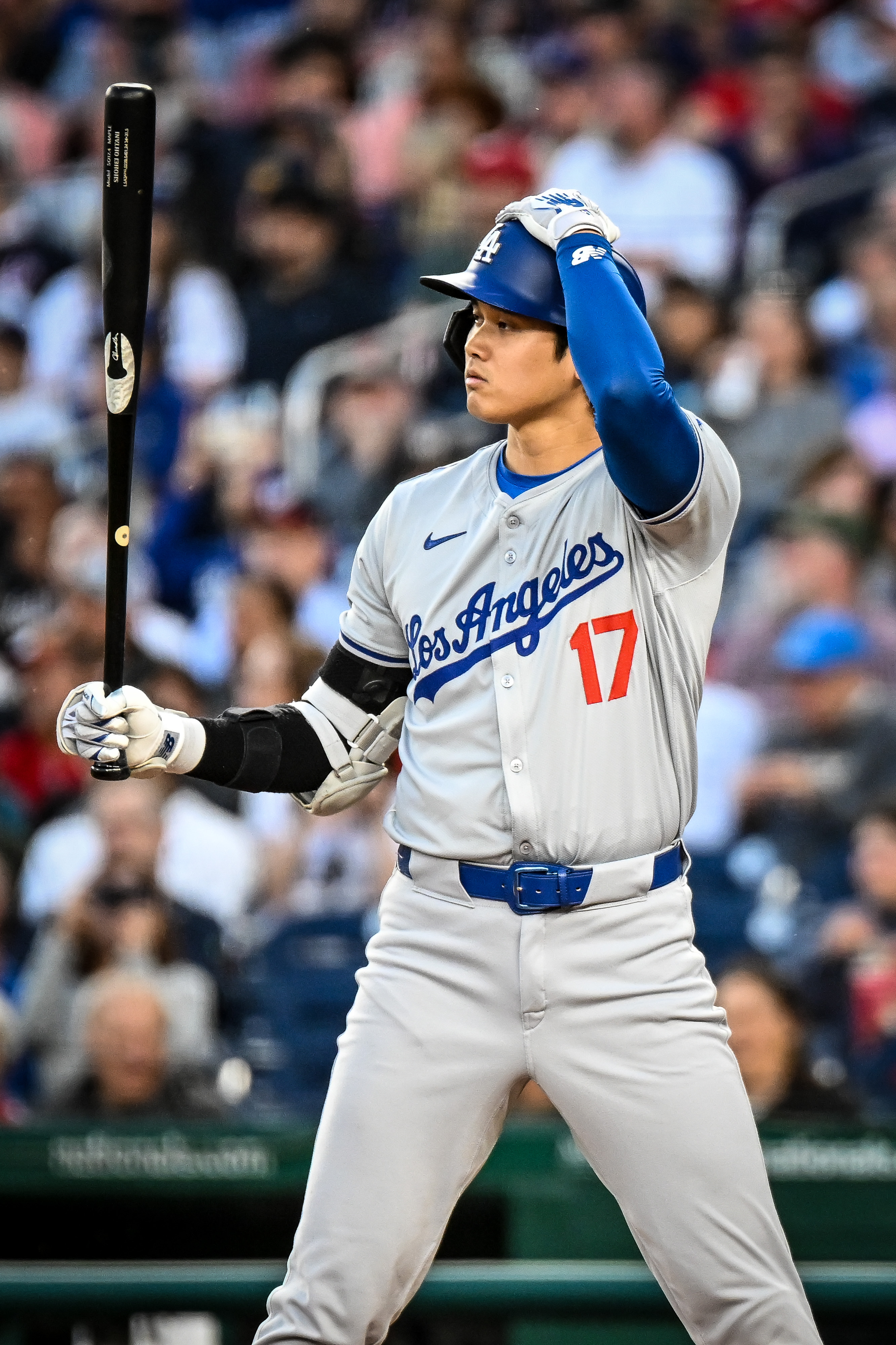
Shohei Ohtani

The Dodgers have signed and promoted players from Asia since the 1980s. Then-owner Peter O'Malley began reaching out in 1980 by starting clinics in China and South Korea and building baseball fields in two Chinese cities, and in 1998 the club became the first major league team to open an office in Asia. It was the second team to start a Japanese player, and the first in nearly 30 years (Hideo Nomo); the first to start a South Korean player (Chan Ho Park); and the first to start a Taiwanese player (Chin-Feng Chen, in 2002). The 2008 roster carried Park, the Japanese pitchers Takashi Saito and Hiroki Kuroda, and Taiwan's Hong-Chih Kuo and Chin-Lung Hu; on May 17 that year Park, Kuo and Saito became the first trio of pitchers from different Asian countries to pitch all nine innings of a major league game. The club signed Hyun-Jin Ryu for 2013 on a six-year, $36 million contract after a posting bid of $25.7 million to the KBO's Hanwha Eagles, Kenta Maeda for 2016 on an eight-year, $25 million contract after a $20 million bid to the NPB's Hiroshima Toyo Carp, and the two-way player Shohei Ohtani for 2024 on a ten-year, $700 million contract, at the time the largest in professional sports history.

The club also has a long-standing following among Mexican Americans in Los Angeles. Mel Almada, born in Sonora and raised in California, was the first Mexican-born player in the major leagues and finished his career with Brooklyn in 1939; Fernando Valenzuela, Ismael Valdéz and Julio Urias later pitched for the Dodgers. The broadcaster Jaime Jarrín estimated that Latinos made up eight to ten percent of the crowd at Dodger Stadium before Valenzuela's debut in 1981; by 2015 they accounted for 2.1 million of the 3.9 million in attendance.

The Dodgers have marked those followings with dedicated promotions. An annual Korean Heritage Night, developed with Korean communities in Los Angeles, began in 2016. After signing Ohtani the club staged theme nights with the Japanese companies Sanrio, whose Hello Kitty night featured the national anthem performed by X Japan member Yoshiki, and the VTuber agency Hololive, timed to coincide with Los Angeles' Anime Expo.

== Radio and television ==
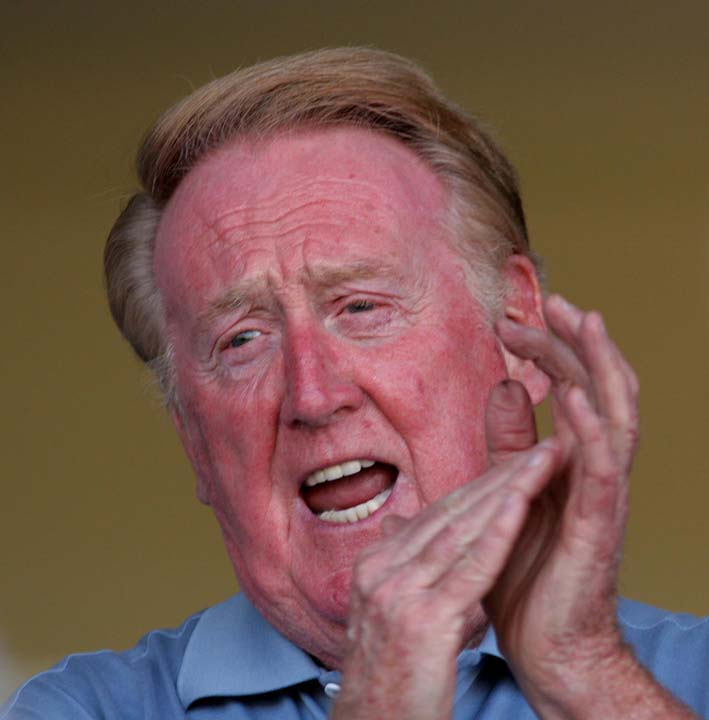
Hall of Fame Dodgers broadcaster Vin Scully

As of 2026, Joe Davis and Orel Hershiser lead the television broadcasts in their eleventh season together, and Tim Neverett and Rick Monday call the club's spring training games. Neverett handles the radio play-by-play, with Monday as the radio color commentator. Stephen Nelson joined the SportsNet LA broadcast in January 2023 to call about 50 games a season in Davis's place. A fourth-generation Japanese American, Nelson was at the time the only Asian American television play-by-play announcer working for a major league club.

From 1950 to 2016, almost all Dodger games were called by Vin Scully. His longtime partners were Jerry Doggett, who called Dodgers games from 1956 to 1987, and Ross Porter, who joined in 1977 and spent 28 seasons in the booth. Scully received the Baseball Hall of Fame's Ford C. Frick Award for broadcasters in 1982. He, Doggett and Porter generally called games alone rather than in the conversational pairing of play-by-play announcer and color commentator that became standard, trading innings with one another.

Doggett retired after the 1987 season; he was replaced by Hall-of-Fame Dodgers pitcher Don Drysdale. Drysdale died in his hotel room following a heart attack before a game in Montreal in 1993. Scully and Porter could not mention it on air until Drysdale's family had been notified and the official announcement made. Former Dodgers outfielder Rick Monday joined the broadcast team that year. Porter's tenure ended after the 2004 season, and for 2005 the club introduced the first two-person English-language booth in its history, pairing a play-by-play announcer with an analyst. Charley Steiner and Monday started calling the radio broadcasts together and Scully continued in his solo role, calling the television broadcasts.

Scully called roughly 100 games per season (all home games and road games in California and Arizona). He was simulcast on radio for the first three innings of each appearance and called the rest for television alone. Scully retired after the 2016 season; his 67 years with the Dodgers were the longest any broadcaster has spent with a single team in American sport. Joe Davis succeeded him on television in 2017.

The Dodgers also broadcast on radio in two other languages, Spanish and Korean. Upon moving to Los Angeles in 1958, the Dodgers became the first MLB team with a Spanish-language flagship station, KWKW (1300 AM), with a broadcast team that included René Cárdenas. From 1959 to 2022, the Spanish play-by-play was voiced by another Frick Award winner, Jaime Jarrín. Until his death in 2024, a color analyst for some games was former Dodger pitcher Fernando Valenzuela, for whom Jarrin once translated post-game interviews. Valenzuela was joined on the Spanish booth in 2023 and 2024 by Pepe Yñiguez and José Mota, son of former Dodgers player Manny Mota. The Spanish-language radio flagship station is KTNQ. Meanwhile, the Dodgers' Korean broadcast began in 2013 through KMPC.

In January 2013 Guggenheim Baseball Management reached a 25-year local television agreement with Time Warner Cable valued at $8.35 billion, a record for a regional sports rights deal, and launched SportsNet LA the following year. Rival distributors declined to carry the channel at the asking price, leaving most of the Los Angeles market unable to watch Dodgers games; the Justice Department sued DirecTV over the standoff in 2016, and the blackout did not end until a carriage agreement took effect in April 2020.

== Achievements ==
The club honors individual players and staff through retired numbers, its Ring of Honor and the Legends of Dodger Baseball.

=== Retired numbers ===
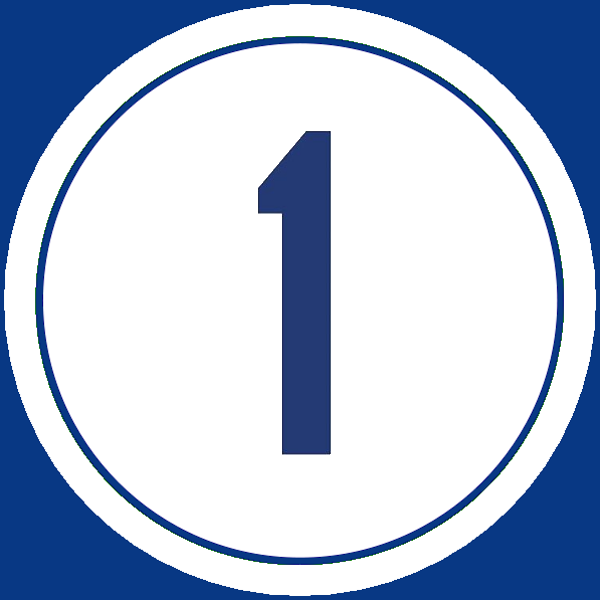
Pee Wee
Reese
SS
Coach
Retired July 1, 1984
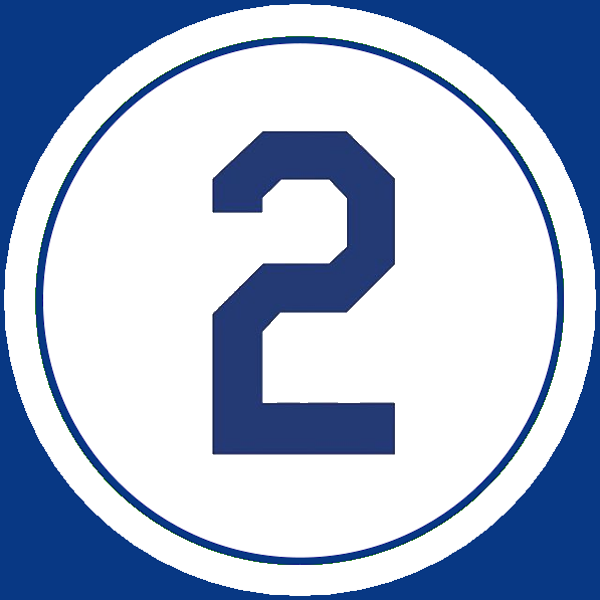
Tommy
Lasorda
P
Coach, Mgr, GM
Retired August 15, 1997
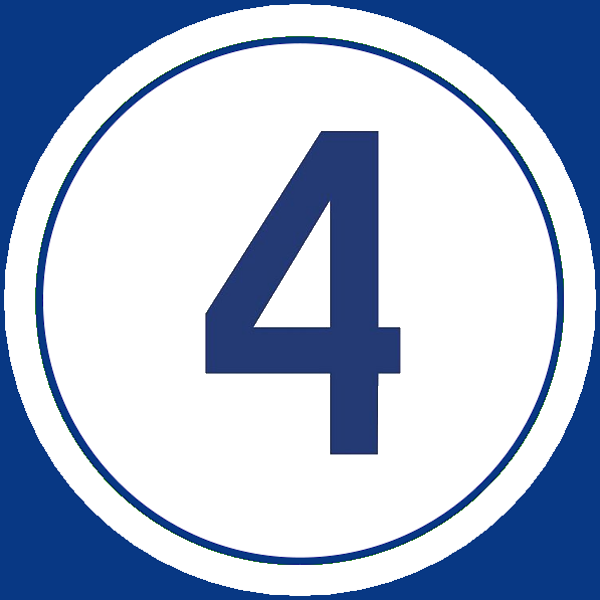
Duke
Snider
CF

Retired July 6, 1980
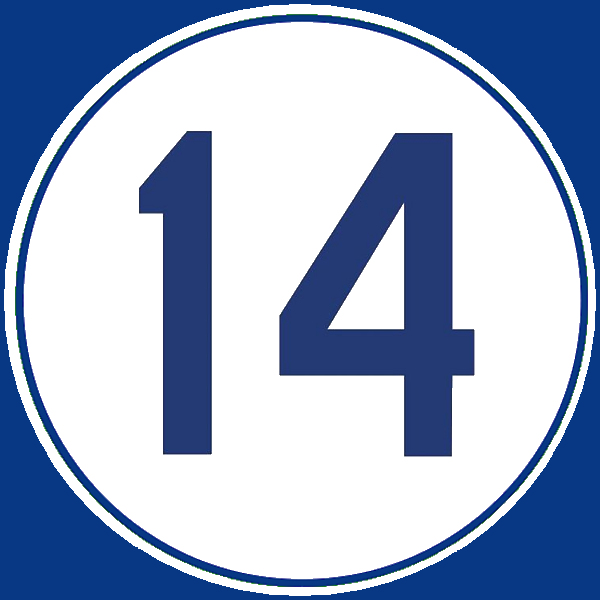
Gil
Hodges
1B

Retired June 4, 2022
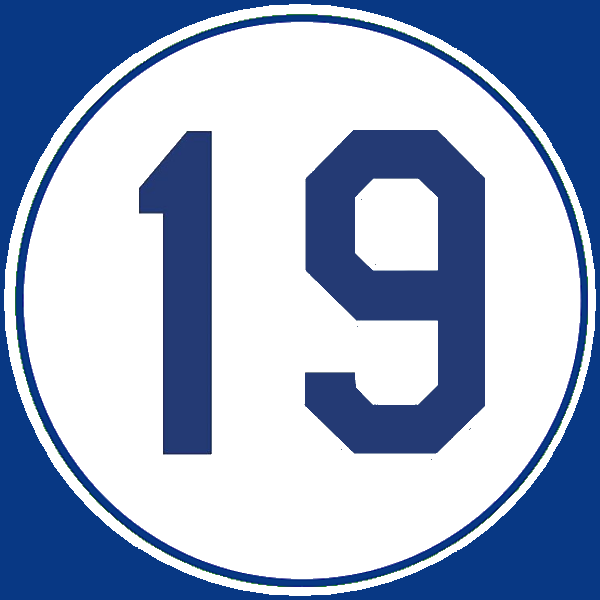
Jim
Gilliam
2B, 3B
Coach
Retired October 10, 1978
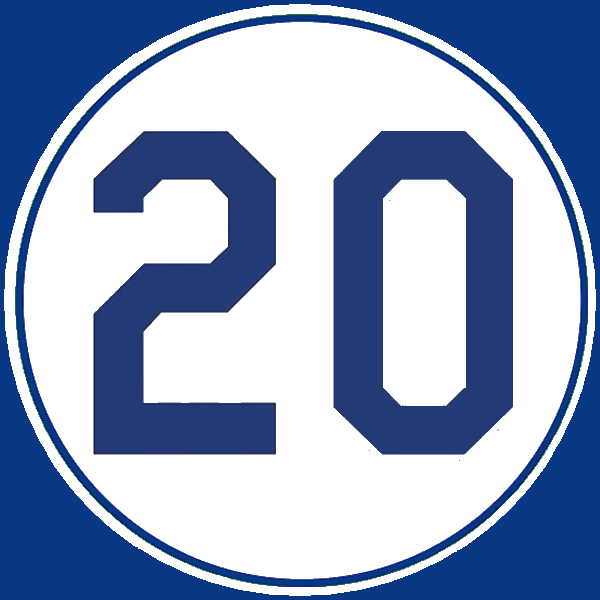
Don
Sutton
P

Retired August 14, 1998
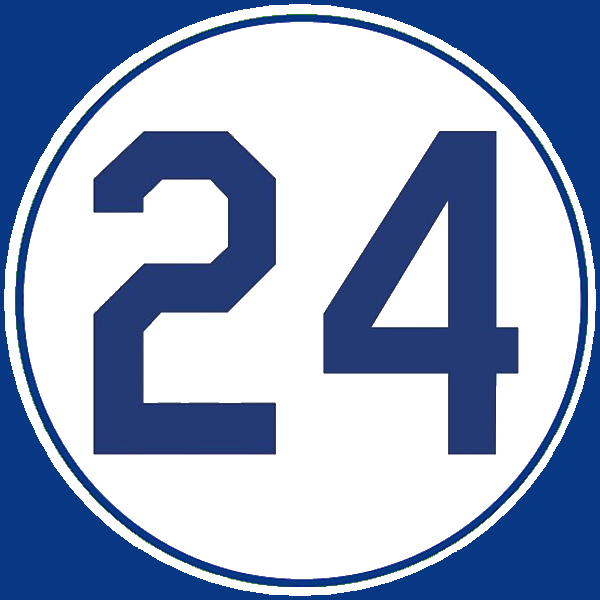
Walter
Alston
Mgr

Retired June 5, 1977

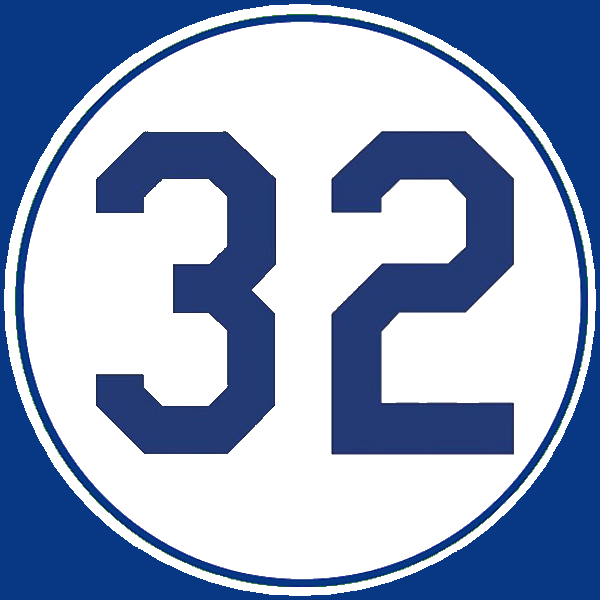
Sandy
Koufax
P

Retired June 4, 1972
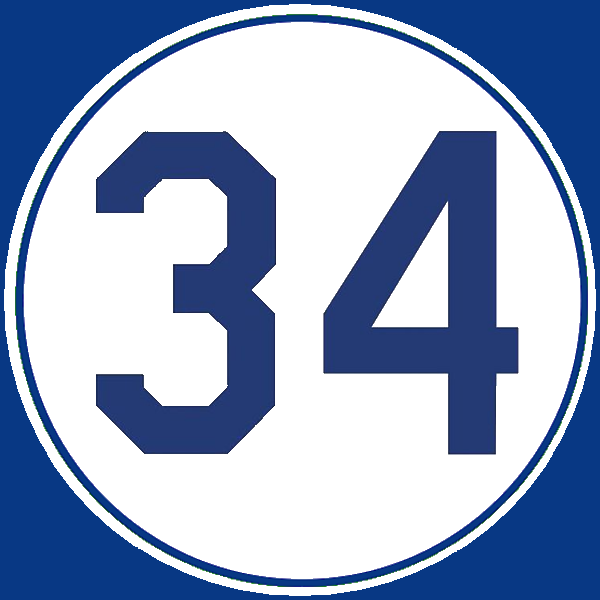
Fernando
Valenzuela
P

Retired August 11, 2023
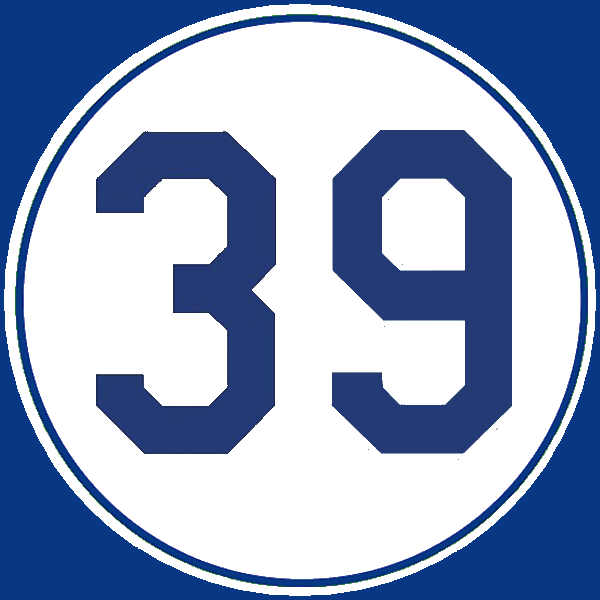
Roy
Campanella
C

Retired June 4, 1972
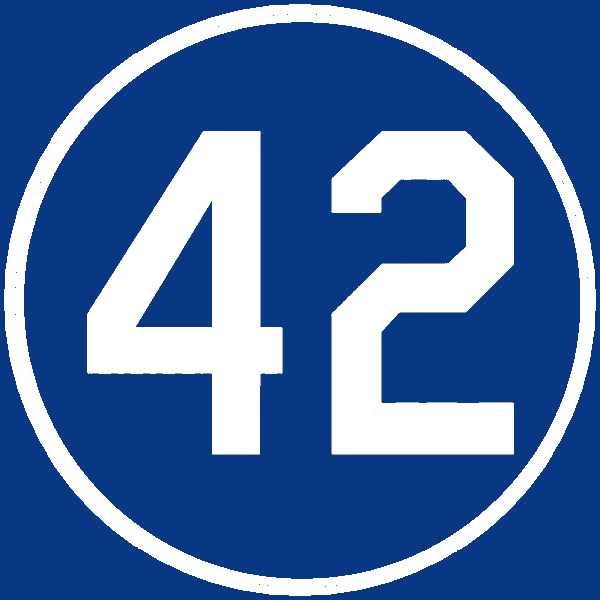
Jackie
Robinson
2B

Retired June 4, 1972
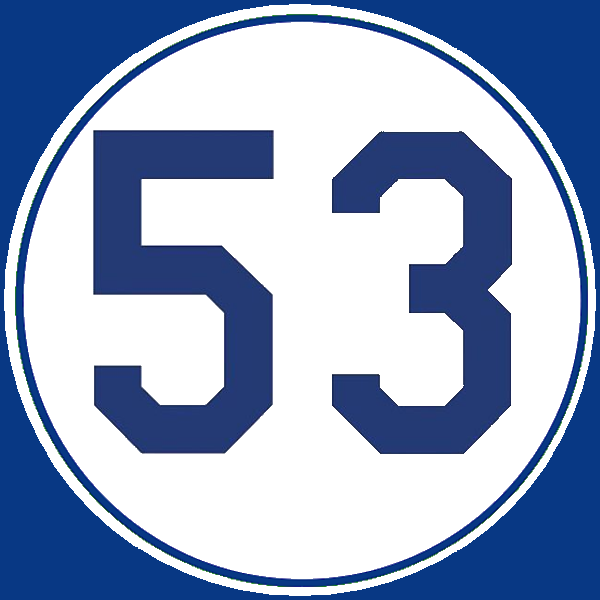
Don
Drysdale
P

Retired July 1, 1984
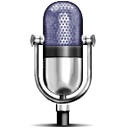
Vin
Scully
Broadcaster

Honored
May 3, 2017
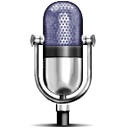
Jaime
Jarrín
Broadcaster

Honored
September 21, 2018
Walter
O'Malley
Owner

Honored
August 11, 2024

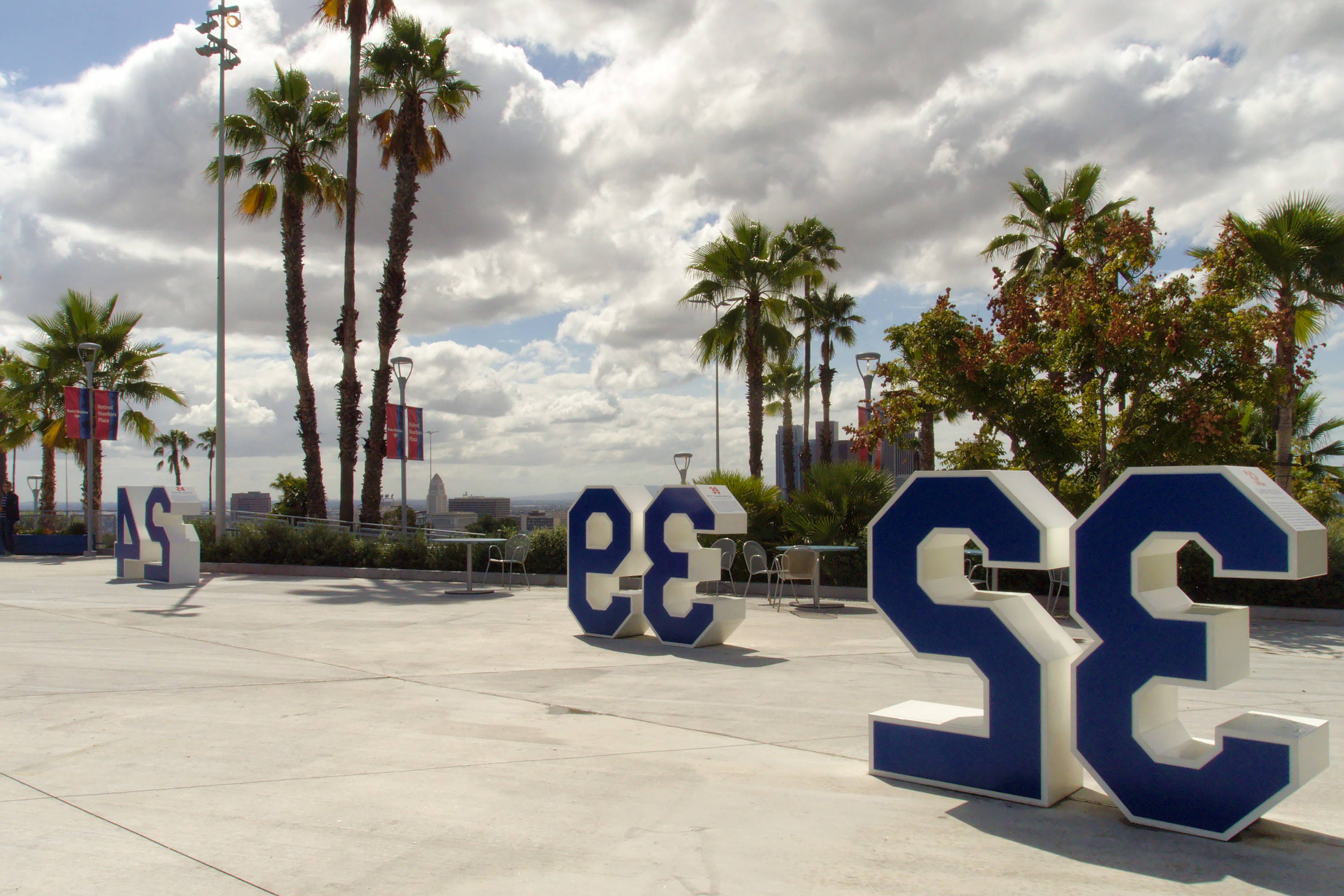
Sculptures of the retired numbers 24 (Walter Alston), 39 (Roy Campanella) and 32 (Sandy Koufax) on a plaza at Dodger Stadium in 2015

Koufax, Campanella, and Robinson were the first Dodgers to have their numbers retired, in a ceremony at Dodger Stadium on June 4, 1972. Although other MLB teams had already been retiring numbers for decades, the Dodgers were late to the trend. Robinson had long been estranged from the Dodgers and from the game, taking part in almost none of its ceremonial events. Robinson did not agree to appear at a number retirement ceremony until O'Malley handed over control of the team to his son Peter in 1970.

Although the Dodgers website states that there are no "written 'criteria' for retiring uniform numbers," the team has historically retired only the numbers of individuals who played most of their career with the Dodgers and are members of the Baseball Hall of Fame. (Underscoring the principle, Koufax, Snider, Reese, Drysdale, Lasorda, Sutton, and Hodges all had their numbers retired during the seasons in which they were inducted into the Hall. Robinson and Campanella had already been Hall of Famers for several years when their numbers were retired in 1972.) There have only been three exceptions:

- Manager Walter Alston's number was retired in 1977, the season after he retired as the Dodgers manager. At the time he retired, he had four World Series rings and was fifth all-time in managerial wins. Alston entered the Hall in 1983.
- Infielder and coach Jim Gilliam's number was retired on October 10, 1978, days after his death at 49 just before that year's World Series. Gilliam played his entire 14-year career with the Dodgers and was still coaching the team when he died.
- Pitcher and broadcaster Fernando Valenzuela's number was retired in 2023, one year before his death from liver cancer. The Dodgers had previously declined to issue Valenzuela's No. 34 to any new players out of respect for Valenzuela's special role in Dodger history. In a strange coincidence, Valenzuela spent 34 years with the Dodgers organization. Like Gilliam, he was still working for the team when he died.

In 1997, 50 years after he broke the color barrier and 25 years after the Dodgers retired his number, Robinson's No. 42 was retired throughout Major League Baseball. Robinson is the only major league baseball player so honored. Starting in the 2007 season, Jackie Robinson Day (April 15, commemorating the Opening Day of Robinson's rookie season of 1947) has featured many or all players and coaches wearing the number 42 as a tribute to Robinson.

A broader term, the Dodgers "Ring of Honor", encompasses both the retired numbers and three non-baseball personnel whose insignia are displayed alongside the retired numbers. Longtime broadcasters Vin Scully (English) and Jaime Jarrín (Spanish) are honored with microphone symbols. Team owner Walter O'Malley, who moved the Dodgers to Los Angeles, joined the Ring of Honor in 2024. All three have been recognized by the Hall of Fame, O'Malley by induction, and Scully and Jarrín by the Ford C. Frick Award for broadcasters.

=== Team captains ===
Five Dodgers have been designated team captain, the last of them Davey Lopes in 1978 and 1979.

- Pee Wee Reese (1949–1958)
- Duke Snider (1962)
- Maury Wills (1963–1966)
- Willie Davis (1973)
- Davey Lopes (1978–1979)

=== Baseball Hall of Famers ===
Players, managers and executives from every era of the franchise have been elected to the National Baseball Hall of Fame, from the 19th-century Brooklyn clubs through the Los Angeles years.

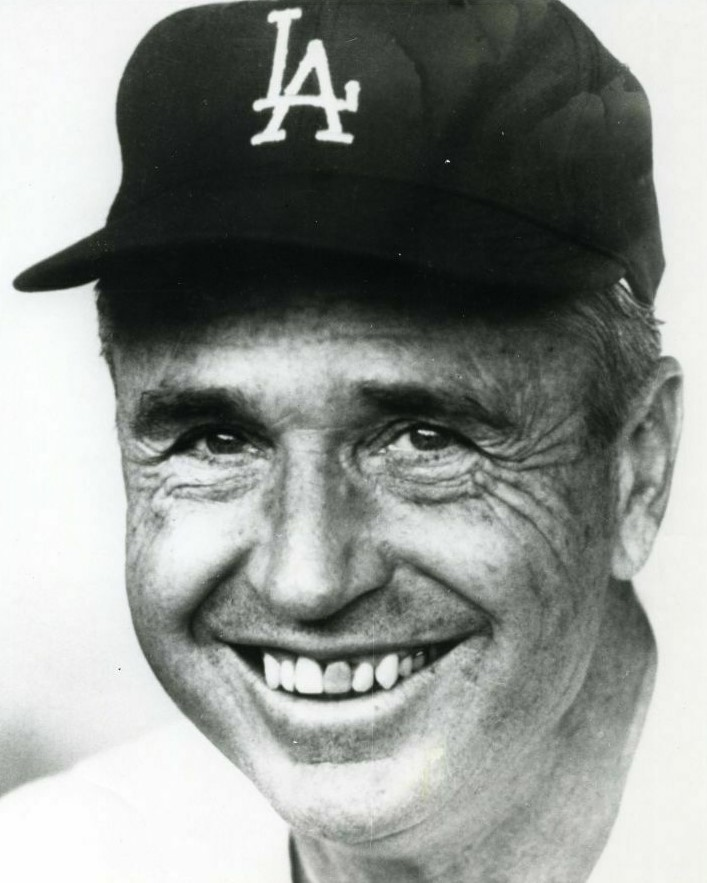
Hall of Fame Manager Walter Alston (1954–1976)

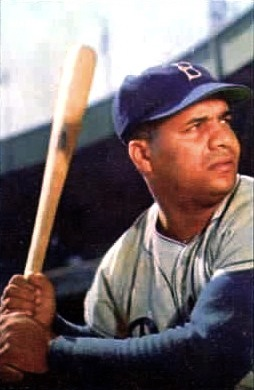
Hall of Fame C Roy Campanella (1948–1957)

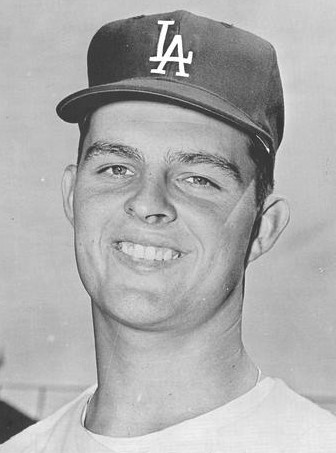
Hall of Fame P Don Drysdale (1956–1969), attended Van Nuys High School in Los Angeles

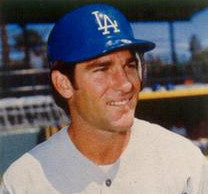
10× All-Star 1B Steve Garvey, named NL MVP in 1974

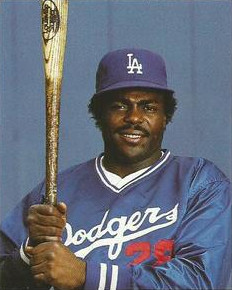
1981 World Series co–MVP, Pedro Guerrero

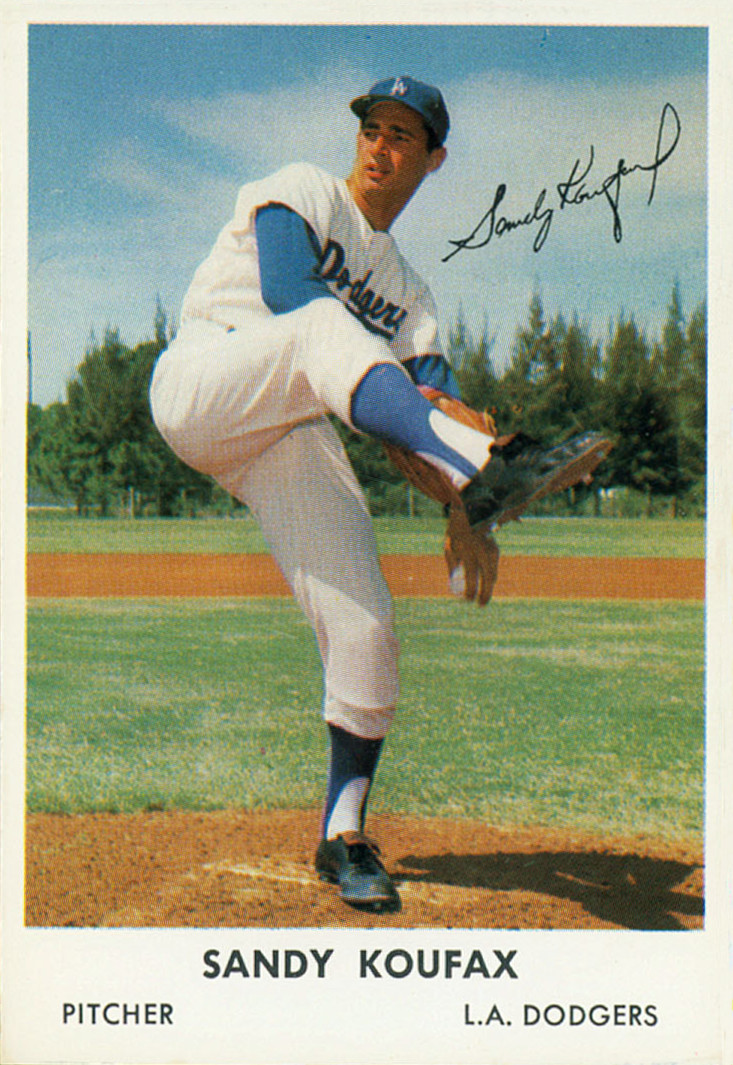
Hall of Fame P Sandy Koufax (1955–1966)

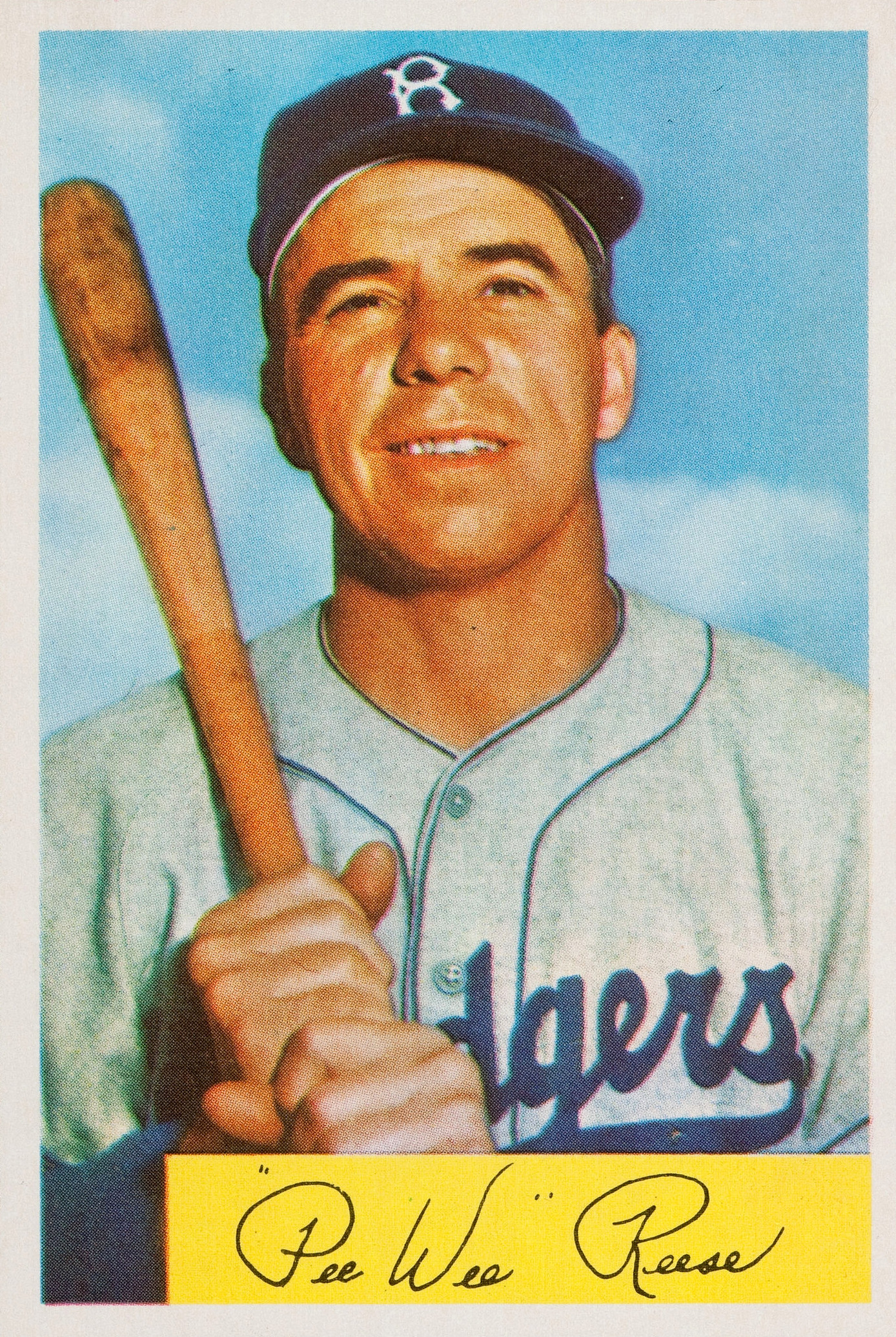
Hall of Fame SS Pee Wee Reese (1940–1942, 1946–1958)

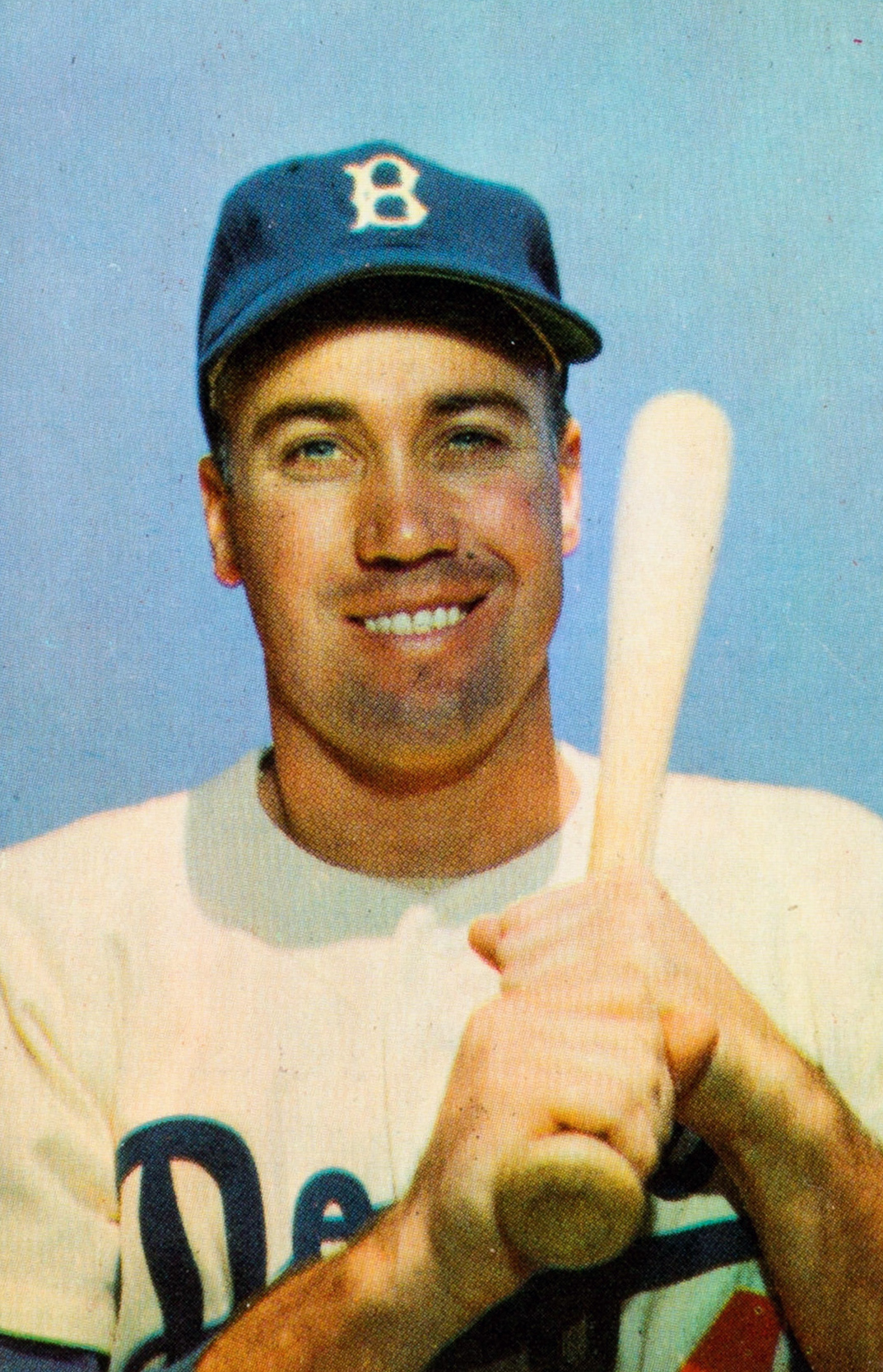
Hall of Fame OF Duke Snider (1947–1962), a native of Compton, California

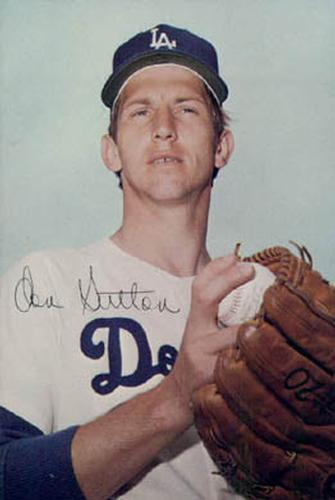
Hall of Fame P Don Sutton (1966–1980)

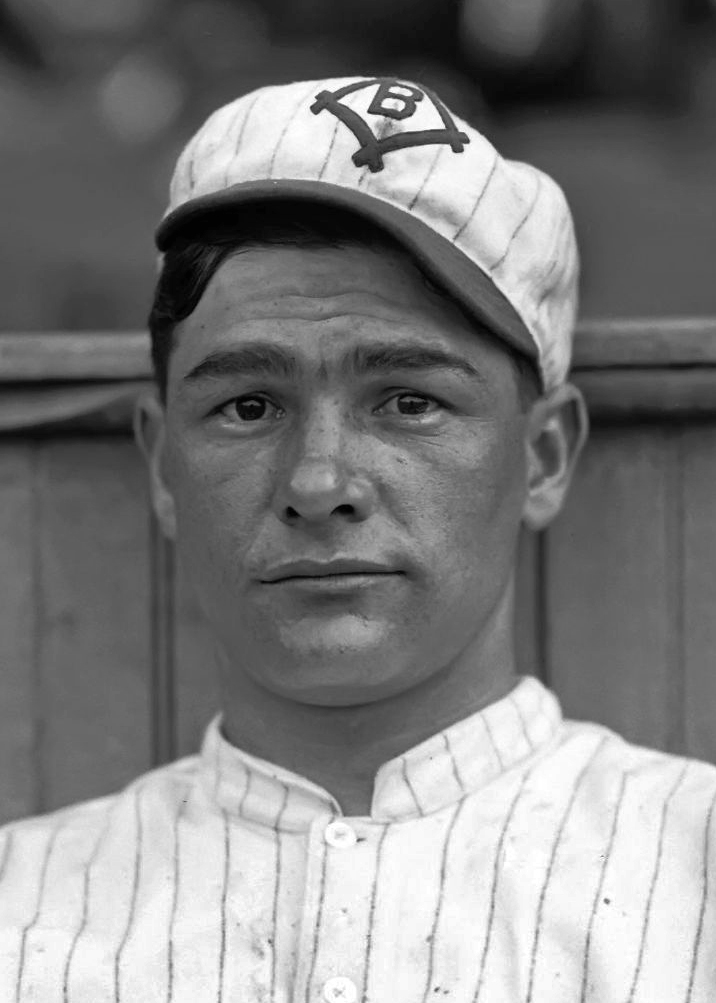
Hall of Fame OF Zack Wheat (1909–1926)

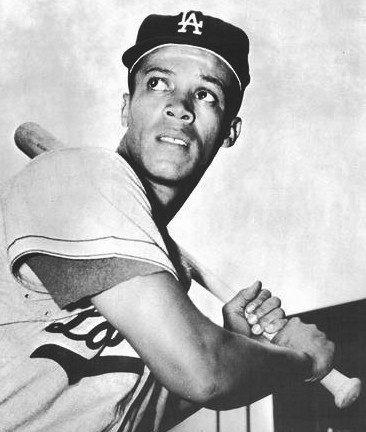
SS Maury Wills, 1962 NL MVP, and 6× NL stolen base leader

Los Angeles Dodgers Hall of Famers
Affiliation according to the National Baseball Hall of Fame and Museum
Brooklyn Bridegrooms/Superbas/Robins/Dodgers

Dave Bancroft
Dan Brouthers
**Roy Campanella**
Max Carey^{1}
Kiki Cuyler
**Leo Durocher**^{2}
**Burleigh Grimes**^{1}

Ned Hanlon
Billy Herman
**Gil Hodges**
Waite Hoyt
Hughie Jennings
**Willie Keeler**
Joe Kelley
George Kelly

Tony Lazzeri
Freddie Lindstrom
Ernie Lombardi
Al López
Heinie Manush
Rabbit Maranville
Rube Marquard

Tommy McCarthy
Joe McGinnity
Joe Medwick
**Pee Wee Reese**
**Jackie Robinson**
**Wilbert Robinson**^{†}
**Duke Snider**
Casey Stengel^{2}

**Dazzy Vance**
Arky Vaughan
Lloyd Waner
Paul Waner
John Montgomery Ward^{1}
**Zack Wheat**
Hack Wilson

Los Angeles Dodgers

Dick Allen
**Walter Alston**
Adrián Beltré
Jim Bunning

Gary Carter
**Don Drysdale**
Rickey Henderson
Andruw Jones
Jeff Kent

**Sandy Koufax**
**Tommy Lasorda**^{2}
Greg Maddux
Juan Marichal
Pedro Martínez

Fred McGriff
Eddie Murray
Walter O'Malley^{‡}
Mike Piazza
Frank Robinson

**Don Sutton**
Jim Thome
Joe Torre
Hoyt Wilhelm

- Players and managers listed in **bold** are depicted on their Hall of Fame plaques wearing a Dodgers, Robins, Superbas, Grooms, or Bridegrooms cap insignia.
- ^{†} – depicted on Hall of Fame plaque without a cap or cap insignia due to not wearing a cap or playing when caps had no insignia; Hall of Fame recognizes Brooklyn/Los Angeles as "Primary Team"
- ^{‡} – Walter O'Malley was inducted as an Executive/Pioneer; accordingly he is depicted without a cap on his Hall of Fame plaque. The Hall of Fame recognizes the Dodgers as his primary team.
- ^{1} – inducted as player, also managed Dodgers or was player-manager
- ^{2} – inducted as manager, also played for Dodgers or was player-manager

=== Ford C. Frick Award recipients ===
The Ford C. Frick Award is presented annually by the Hall of Fame for major contributions to baseball broadcasting. Vin Scully received it in 1982.

Los Angeles Dodgers Ford C. Frick Award recipients
Affiliation according to the National Baseball Hall of Fame and Museum

Red Barber

Ernie Harwell

Al Helfer

**Jaime Jarrín**

**Vin Scully**

- **Names in bold** received the award based primarily on their work as broadcasters for the Dodgers.
- * Played as Dodgers

=== Legends of Dodger Baseball ===
In 2019, the Dodgers established "Legends of Dodger Baseball", which is meant to honor Dodger greats whose numbers have not been retired. The program honors those who made an "impact on the franchise, both on and off the field." Recipients are recognized with plaques at Dodger Stadium.

- Steve Garvey (2019)
- Don Newcombe (2019)
- Fernando Valenzuela (2019; number retired in 2023)
- Maury Wills (2022)
- Kirk Gibson (2022)
- Orel Hershiser (2023)
- Manny Mota (2023)
- Dusty Baker (2024)
- Ron Cey (2025)
- Reggie Smith (2026)

=== Awards ===
Thirteen Dodgers have been named National League Most Valuable Player, and eight Dodger pitchers have won twelve Cy Young Awards between them. Eighteen Dodgers have won the National League Rookie of the Year Award, more than any other franchise, including five in consecutive years from 1992 to 1996.

==== Most Valuable Player (NL) ====
- **Brooklyn**
  - 1913 – Jake Daubert
  - 1924 – Dazzy Vance
  - 1941 – Dolph Camilli
  - 1949 – Jackie Robinson
  - 1951 – Roy Campanella
  - 1953 – Roy Campanella
  - 1955 – Roy Campanella
  - 1956 – Don Newcombe
- **Los Angeles**
  - 1962 – Maury Wills
  - 1963 – Sandy Koufax
  - 1974 – Steve Garvey
  - 1988 – Kirk Gibson
  - 2014 – Clayton Kershaw
  - 2019 – Cody Bellinger
  - 2024 – Shohei Ohtani
  - 2025 – Shohei Ohtani

==== World Series Most Valuable Player ====
- 1955 – Johnny Podres
- 1959 – Larry Sherry
- 1963 – Sandy Koufax
- 1965 – Sandy Koufax
- 1981 – Ron Cey, Pedro Guerrero, and Steve Yeager
- 1988 – Orel Hershiser
- 2020 – Corey Seager
- 2024 – Freddie Freeman
- 2025 - Yoshinobu Yamamoto

==== Cy Young Award (NL) ====
- **Brooklyn**
  - 1956 – Don Newcombe (MLB)
- **Los Angeles**
  - 1962 – Don Drysdale (MLB)
  - 1963 – Sandy Koufax (MLB)
  - 1965 – Sandy Koufax (MLB)
  - 1966 – Sandy Koufax (MLB)
  - 1974 – Mike Marshall
  - 1981 – Fernando Valenzuela
  - 1988 – Orel Hershiser
  - 2003 – Éric Gagné
  - 2011 – Clayton Kershaw
  - 2013 – Clayton Kershaw
  - 2014 – Clayton Kershaw

==== Triple Crown ====
- **Brooklyn**
  - 1924 – Dazzy Vance
- **Los Angeles**
  - 1963 – Sandy Koufax
  - 1965 – Sandy Koufax
  - 1966 – Sandy Koufax
  - 2011 – Clayton Kershaw

==== Rookie of the Year Award (NL) ====
- **Brooklyn**
  - 1947 – Jackie Robinson (MLB)
  - 1949 – Don Newcombe
  - 1952 – Joe Black
  - 1953 – Jim Gilliam
- **Los Angeles**
  - 1960 – Frank Howard
  - 1965 – Jim Lefebvre
  - 1969 – Ted Sizemore
  - 1979 – Rick Sutcliffe
  - 1980 – Steve Howe
  - 1981 – Fernando Valenzuela
  - 1982 – Steve Sax
  - 1992 – Eric Karros
  - 1993 – Mike Piazza
  - 1994 – Raúl Mondesi
  - 1995 – Hideo Nomo
  - 1996 – Todd Hollandsworth
  - 2016 – Corey Seager
  - 2017 – Cody Bellinger

=== Team records ===
From 1884 through 2026 the franchise's regular-season record is 11,625–10,199–139, and its record since moving to Los Angeles in 1958 is 6,001–4,919–6. Dodgers pitchers have thrown 23 no-hitters, more than any other franchise, along with three more for Brooklyn before the club entered the National League in 1890.

=== Historical records and firsts ===
- First baseball team to win championships in different leagues in consecutive years (1889–1890)
- Home team for the first televised major league game (1939)
- Introduced protective batting headgear, the "Brooklyn Safety Cap" (1941)
- First MLB team to employ and start an African American player in the 20th century (Jackie Robinson, 1947)
- First team with a Rookie of the Year, the inaugural award (Jackie Robinson, 1947)
- First MLB team to employ an official statistician (Allan Roth, 1947)
- First fully integrated Major League Baseball spring training site in the South (Dodgertown, 1948)
- First MLB team to have numbers on the front of their uniforms (1952)
- First team with a player to win the Cy Young Award and be named MVP in the same season (Don Newcombe, 1956)
- First West Coast team (1958) – along with the San Francisco Giants
- First MLB team with a Spanish-language flagship radio station (KWKW, with René Cárdenas, 1958)
- First West Coast team to win a World Series (1959)
- First privately financed major league ballpark since 1923 (Dodger Stadium, 1962)
- First MLB team to allow a female sports journalist into a locker room (Anita Martini, 1974)
- Only team with a player to win the Cy Young Award and Rookie of the Year in the same season (Fernando Valenzuela, 1981)
- Only franchise to win multiple World Series titles in the 1980s (1981, 1988)
- First MLB team to establish a baseball academy in the Dominican Republic when they opened the doors to Campo Las Palmas (1987)
- First MLB team to open an office in Asia (1998)
- First MLB team to start a South Korean player (Chan Ho Park) and a Taiwanese player (Chin-Feng Chen)
- Then-record price for a North American sports franchise ($2.15 billion, 2012)
- First MLB team to employ a female physical therapist (Sue Falsone, 2007), and the first team in the four major U.S. professional sports leagues to employ a woman as head athletic trainer (2011)
- First team to draw 3 million fans in a season (1978)
- First Walk-off Grand Slam in World Series history (2024)
- MLB record for the best start for a defending champion going 8–0 (2025)
- First team to win back-to-back World Series titles (2024, 2025) in 25 years; first National League team in 49 years

== Personnel ==
=== Current roster ===
Los Angeles Dodgers 2027 spring training roster
40-man roster		Non-roster invitees	Coaches / other
Pitchers: 40 Kris Bubic; 3 Edwin Díaz; 86 Jack Dreyer; 65 Paul Gervase; 31 Tyler Glasnow; 56 Seth Halvorsen; 60 Edgardo Henriquez; 63 Kyle Hurt; 96 Landon Knack; 83 Ronan Kopp; 28 Bobby Miller; 59 Evan Phillips; 11 Roki Sasaki; 66 Tanner Scott; 80 Emmet Sheehan; 29 Tarik Skubal; 7 Blake Snell; 41 Brock Stewart; 49 Blake Treinen; 51 Alex Vesia; 70 Justin Wrobleski; 18 Yoshinobu Yamamoto; Two-way players: 17 Shohei Ohtani	Catchers: 64 Eliézer Alfonzo Jr.; 46 Hunter Feduccia; 68 Dalton Rushing; 16 Will Smith; Infielders: 50 Mookie Betts; 25 Tommy Edman; 76 Alex Freeland; 5 Freddie Freeman; 8 Kiké Hernández; 6 Hyeseong Kim; 13 Max Muncy; Outfielders: 12 Alex Call; 37 Teoscar Hernández; 44 Andy Pages; 23 Kyle Tucker; Designated hitters: 95 Josue De Paula		Manager: 30 Dave Roberts; Coaches: 54 Josh Bard (bullpen); 98 Aaron Bates (hitting); 91 Dino Ebel (third base); 88 Bob Geren (field coordinator); 0 Danny Lehmann (bench); 87 Connor McGuiness (assistant pitching); 99 Mark Prior (pitching); 72 Robert Van Scoyoc (hitting); 84 Chris Woodward (first base); 60-day injured list: 78 Ben Casparius; -- Jake Cousins; 48 Brusdar Graterol; 61 Will Klein; 33 Eric Lauer; 35 Gavin Stone; 40 active, 0 inactive, 0 non-roster invitees; 7-, 10-, or 15-day injured list; * Not on active roster; ^{†} Suspended list; Roster, coaches, and NRIs updated October 15, 2026; Transactions • Depth chart; → All MLB rosters

=== Current management ===
Guggenheim Baseball Management has owned the Dodgers since 2012. Mark Walter of Guggenheim Partners is the controlling partner, and Stan Kasten is the club's president and chief executive officer.

- Owner: Guggenheim Baseball Management
  - Chairman/Controlling Partner: Mark Walter
  - Partner: Magic Johnson
  - Partner: Peter Guber
  - Partner: Todd Boehly
  - Partner: Billie Jean King
  - Partner: Ilana Kloss
  - Partner: Bobby Patton
  - Partner: Alan Smolinisky
  - Partner: Robert L. Plummer
- President/chief executive officer: Stan Kasten
- President of Baseball Operations: Andrew Friedman
- General Manager: Brandon Gomes

=== Presidents ===
Charlie Byrne, the club's first president, personally handled work that a modern front office divides among many staff, including tickets, concessions and the ballpark itself. He delegated some of it to a young employee named Charles Ebbets, who succeeded him in 1898.

- Charlie Byrne (1883–1897)
- Charles Ebbets (1898–1925)
- Edward McKeever (1925, interim)
- Wilbert Robinson (1925–1929)
- Frank B. York (1930–1932)
- Stephen McKeever (1933–1938)
- Larry MacPhail (1939–1942)
- Branch Rickey (1943–1950)
- Walter O'Malley (1950–1970)
- Peter O'Malley (1970–1997)
- Bob Graziano (1998–2004)
- Jamie McCourt (2004–2009)
- Dennis Mannion (2009–2010)
- Stan Kasten (2012–present)

=== Managers ===
Since 1884, the Dodgers have used a total of 32 Managers, the most recent being Dave Roberts, who was hired in November 2015 after the departure of Don Mattingly.

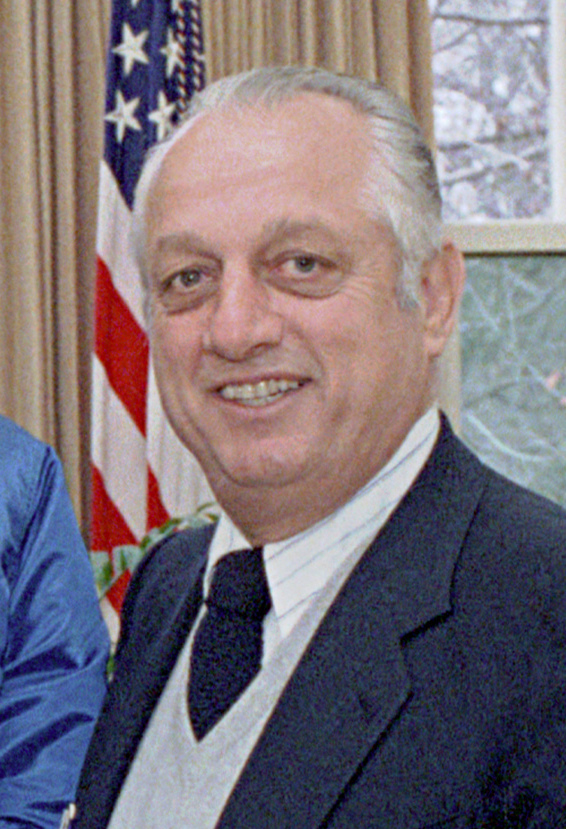
Tommy Lasorda 1981

Over the nearly 43 years from 1954 to mid-1996, the Dodgers employed only two managers, Walter Alston and Tommy Lasorda, both of whom are in the Hall of Fame. During this entire time period of extraordinary stability, the Dodgers were family-owned by Walter O'Malley and then his son Peter O'Malley. It was during this era that the Dodgers won 11 of their 26 National League pennants and their first six World Series championships.

The managers of the Los Angeles Dodgers (1958–present) are as follows:

- Walter Alston (1958–1976) (in Brooklyn since 1954)
- Tommy Lasorda (1976–1996)
- Bill Russell (1996–1998)
- Glenn Hoffman (1998)
- Davey Johnson (1999–2000)
- Jim Tracy (2001–2005)
- Grady Little (2006–2007)
- Joe Torre (2008–2010)
- Don Mattingly (2011–2015)
- Dave Roberts (2016–present)

=== General Managers/Presidents of Baseball Operations ===
Since 2014 the Dodgers have divided this role, with Andrew Friedman directing baseball operations as a club president and a general manager reporting to him.

- Larry MacPhail (1938–1942)
- Branch Rickey (1943–1950)
- Buzzie Bavasi (1950–1968)
- Fresco Thompson (1968)
- Al Campanis (1968–1987)
- Fred Claire (1987–1998)
- Tommy Lasorda (1998)
- Kevin Malone (1999–2001)
- Dave Wallace (2001)
- Dan Evans (2001–2004)
- Paul DePodesta (2004–2005)
- Ned Colletti (2005–2014)
- Andrew Friedman (2014–present) *as President of Baseball Operations (Note: Friedman's role includes the traditional powers of a general manager. This follows the general trend in Major League Baseball to create new positions above the general manager. Friedman did not employ a general manager from 2018 to 2022.)
  - Farhan Zaidi (2014–2018) *as general manager
  - Brandon Gomes (2022–present) *as general manager

=== Public address announcers/organists ===
From the Dodgers' move to Los Angeles from Brooklyn in 1958, the Dodgers employed a handful of well-known public address announcers, the most famous of which was John Ramsey. Ramsey was the PA voice of the Dodgers from 1958, and also announced at other Los Angeles venues, including the Los Angeles Memorial Coliseum. He died in January 1990.

Dennis Packer served as a back-up voice for Ramsey, later becoming public address announcer for the Angels, Dodgers, Clippers, Kings and Raiders. Phillip Petty was a part-time public address announcer for the Dodgers and the California Angels.

Nick Nickson, a radio broadcaster for the Los Angeles Kings, was the Dodger Stadium public address announcer from 1983 through the 1989 season.

Packer announced the 1994 FIFA World Cup matches at the Rose Bowl. Mike Carlucci later served as the Dodgers' public address announcer, and has also announced for the Ducks, UCLA baseball and at several Olympic Games.

Eric Smith was the Dodgers public address announcer until 2015; he has also announced for the Los Angeles Clippers and USC Trojans. On April 3, 2015, the Dodgers announced that former radio broadcaster Todd Leitz was hired to become their new public address announcer. Leitz was an anchor and news reporter in Los Angeles at KNX 1070 AM for 10 years, and a news reporter at KABC 790 for two years. From 1988 to 2015, Nancy Bea Hefley was the Dodger Stadium organist, taking over from Helen Dell. She was succeeded by Dieter Ruehle, only the third organist the club has had since 1971.

=== Other ===
Vin Scully is permanently honored in the Baseball Hall of Fame's "Scribes & Mikemen" exhibit as a result of winning the Ford C. Frick Award in 1982. Frick Award recipients are not official members of the Hall.

Allan Roth was the first person hired as the official statistician of a Major League team when he was hired by the Brooklyn Dodgers in 1947. He continued his tenure with Los Angeles until 1964.

Sue Falsone joined the Dodgers in 2007 as the first female physical therapist in Major League Baseball. The club hired her as head physical therapist and athletic trainer in October 2011, making her the first woman to serve as head athletic trainer in any of the four major U.S. professional sports leagues. She held the position for the 2012 and 2013 seasons and announced her departure in October 2013.

== Minor league affiliations ==
The Los Angeles Dodgers farm system consists of seven minor league affiliates.

Class	Team	League	Location	Ballpark	Affiliated
Triple-A	Oklahoma City Comets	Pacific Coast League	Oklahoma City	Chickasaw Bricktown Ballpark	2015
Double-A	Tulsa Drillers	Texas League	Tulsa	Oneok Field	2015
High-A	Great Lakes Loons	Midwest League	Midland	Dow Diamond	2007
Single-A	Ontario Tower Buzzers	California League	Ontario	ONT Field	2026
Rookie	ACL Dodgers	Arizona Complex League	Phoenix	Camelback Ranch	2021
Rookie	DSL Dodgers Bautista	Dominican Summer League	Santo Domingo	Las Palmas Complex	2019
Rookie	DSL Dodgers Mega	Dominican Summer League	Santo Domingo	Las Palmas Complex	2022

== See also ==
- Dodger Dog – Hot dog served by the Los Angeles Dodgers
- List of Brooklyn Dodgers Opening Day starting pitchers
- List of Los Angeles Dodgers first-round draft picks
- List of Los Angeles Dodgers in the Baseball Hall of Fame
- List of Los Angeles Dodgers no-hitters
- List of Los Angeles Dodgers Opening Day starting pitchers
- Los Angeles Dodgers all-time roster
- Los Angeles Dodgers minor league players
- Roy Campanella Award – Annual Los Angeles Dodgers award

== Explanatory notes ==
Awards and achievements
Preceded by New York Giants; 1954	World Series champions Brooklyn Dodgers; 1955	Succeeded by New York Yankees; 1956
Preceded by New York Yankees; 1958	World Series champions Los Angeles Dodgers; 1959	Succeeded by Pittsburgh Pirates; 1960
Preceded by New York Yankees; 1962	World Series champions Los Angeles Dodgers; 1963	Succeeded by St. Louis Cardinals; 1964
Preceded by St. Louis Cardinals; 1964	World Series champions Los Angeles Dodgers; 1965	Succeeded by Baltimore Orioles; 1966
Preceded by Philadelphia Phillies; 1980	World Series champions Los Angeles Dodgers; 1981	Succeeded by St. Louis Cardinals; 1982
Preceded by Minnesota Twins; 1987	World Series champions Los Angeles Dodgers; 1988	Succeeded by Oakland Athletics; 1989
Preceded by Washington Nationals; 2019	World Series champions Los Angeles Dodgers; 2020	Succeeded by Atlanta Braves; 2021
Preceded by Texas Rangers; 2023	World Series champions Los Angeles Dodgers; 2024–2025	Succeeded by Milwaukee Brewers; 2026
Preceded by New York Giants; 1888–1889	National League champions Brooklyn Bridegrooms; 1890	Succeeded by Boston Beaneaters; 1891
Preceded by Boston Beaneaters; 1897–1898	National League champions Brooklyn Superbas; 1899–1900	Succeeded by Pittsburgh Pirates; 1901–1903
Preceded by Philadelphia Phillies; 1915	National League champions Brooklyn Robins; 1916	Succeeded by New York Giants; 1917
Preceded by Cincinnati Reds; 1919	National League champions Brooklyn Robins; 1920	Succeeded by New York Giants; 1921–1924
Preceded by Cincinnati Reds; 1939–1940	National League champions Brooklyn Dodgers; 1941	Succeeded by St. Louis Cardinals; 1942–1944
Preceded by St. Louis Cardinals; 1946	National League champions Brooklyn Dodgers; 1947	Succeeded by Boston Braves; 1948
Preceded by Boston Braves; 1948	National League champions Brooklyn Dodgers; 1949	Succeeded by Philadelphia Phillies; 1950
Preceded by New York Giants; 1951	National League champions Brooklyn Dodgers; 1952–1953	Succeeded by New York Giants; 1954
Preceded by New York Giants; 1954	National League champions Brooklyn Dodgers; 1955–1956	Succeeded by Milwaukee Braves; 1957–1958
Preceded by Milwaukee Braves; 1957–1958	National League champions Los Angeles Dodgers; 1959	Succeeded by Pittsburgh Pirates; 1960
Preceded by San Francisco Giants; 1962	National League champions Los Angeles Dodgers; 1963	Succeeded by St. Louis Cardinals; 1964
Preceded by St. Louis Cardinals; 1964	National League champions Los Angeles Dodgers; 1965–1966	Succeeded by St. Louis Cardinals; 1967–1968
Preceded by New York Mets; 1973	National League champions Los Angeles Dodgers; 1974	Succeeded by Cincinnati Reds; 1975–1976
Preceded by Cincinnati Reds; 1975–1976	National League champions Los Angeles Dodgers; 1977–1978	Succeeded by Pittsburgh Pirates; 1979
Preceded by Philadelphia Phillies; 1980	National League champions Los Angeles Dodgers; 1981	Succeeded by St. Louis Cardinals; 1982
Preceded by St. Louis Cardinals; 1987	National League champions Los Angeles Dodgers; 1988	Succeeded by San Francisco Giants; 1989
Preceded by Chicago Cubs; 2016	National League champions Los Angeles Dodgers; 2017–2018	Succeeded by Washington Nationals; 2019
Preceded by Washington Nationals; 2019	National League champions Los Angeles Dodgers; 2020	Succeeded by Atlanta Braves; 2021
Preceded by Arizona Diamondbacks; 2023	National League champions Los Angeles Dodgers; 2024–2025	Succeeded by Milwaukee Brewers; 2026
Preceded by St. Louis Browns; 1885–1888	American Association champions Brooklyn Bridegrooms; 1889	Succeeded by Louisville Colonels; 1890
