= Agent 13 =

Agent 13 may refer to:

- James Wilkinson, American army officer and politician (1757–1825), spied for Spain under the codename Agent 13
- Agent 13: The Midnight Avenger, a spy fiction series published by TSR from 1986 to 1988, and the name of the main character
  - Agent 13: The Invisible Empire (1986), the first book in the series
  - Agent 13: The Serpentine Assassin (1986), the second book in the series
- Fury/Agent 13 (1998), a comic book miniseries published by Marvel Comics
  - Agent 13 (comics) or Sharon Carter, a character in the series
    - Agent 13 (Marvel Cinematic Universe), an adaptation of the character
- Agent 13, a supporting character in the spy parody TV series Get Smart
