= Arizona Complex League Dodgers =

- (1983–1992, 2001–present); Glendale, Arizona; Gulf Coast League Dodgers before 2009

Minor league affiliations
- Class: Rookie
- League: Arizona Complex League
- Division: Central
- Previous leagues: Arizona League (2009–2020); Gulf Coast League (1983–1992, 2001–2008)

Major league affiliations
- Team: Los Angeles Dodgers

Minor league titles
- League titles (6): 1983; 1986; 1987; 1990; 2018; 2024
- Division titles (13): 1983; 1986; 1987; 1989; 1990; 2001; 2002; 2006; 2017; 2018; 2019; 2023; 2024

Team data
- Name: ACL Dodgers (2021–present)
- Previous names: AZL Dodgers Lasorda & Mota (2019); AZL Dodgers (2009–2018); GCL Dodgers (1983–1992, 2001–2008)
- Ballpark: Camelback Ranch (2009–present)
- Previous parks: Holman Stadium (1983–1992, 2001–2008)
- Owner/ Operator: Los Angeles Dodgers
- Manager: Fumi Ishibashi

The Arizona Complex League Dodgers are a Rookie-level affiliate of the Los Angeles Dodgers, competing in the Arizona Complex League of Minor League Baseball. The team plays its home games at Camelback Ranch in Phoenix, Arizona. The team is composed mainly of players who are in their first year of professional baseball either as draftees or non-drafted free agents.

== History ==
The Los Angeles Dodgers previously fielded a Rookie-level team in the Gulf Coast League (GCL) from 1983 to 1992 and then from 2001 to 2008, known as the Gulf Coast League Dodgers. The team played its home games in Vero Beach, Florida, on Field One of Historic Dodgertown. Dodgertown includes Holman Stadium, which was the spring training home to the major-league Dodgers. The GCL Dodgers originally played from 1983 to 1992, and then became absent from the GCL until they reappeared in 2001.

In 2009, the Dodgers announced that the team would relocate to Arizona and compete in the Arizona League (AZL). The team plays its home games at Camelback Ranch, the spring training facility of the major-league Dodgers. In 2019, the Dodgers fielded two squads in the Arizona League, differentiated with suffixes "Lasorda" and "Mota". Prior to the 2021 season, the Arizona League was renamed as the Arizona Complex League (ACL).

== Season by season ==
Year	Record	Finish	Manager	Playoffs
GCL Dodgers (1983–1992)
1983	37–23	2nd	Gary LaRocque	League Champs
1984	34–29	4th	Jose Alvarez	
1985	28–33	6th	Jose Alvarez	
1986	33–28	2nd	Jose Alvarez	League Champs
1987	43–20	1st	Jose Alvarez	League Champs
1988	43–20	2nd	Jose Alvarez	
1989	40–23	2nd (t)	Jerry Royster	Lost League Finals
1990	38–25	2nd	Iván DeJesús	League Champs
1991	29–31	10th	Iván DeJesús	
1992	32–27	5th	John Shoemaker	
GCL Dodgers (2001–2008)
2001	41–19	1st	Juan Bustabad	Lost League Finals
2002	33–27	5th	Luis Salazar	Lost League Finals
2003	29–31	6th	Luis Salazar	
2004	31–29	6th (t)	Luis Salazar	
2005	25–29	7th	Luis Salazar	
2006	32–22	4th	Juan Bustabad	Lost League Finals
2007	40–15	1st	Juan Bustabad	Lost League Finals
2008	30–26	3rd	Jeff Carter	
AZL Dodgers (2009–2019)
2009	24–32	4th	Jeff Carter	
2010	30–25	3rd	Lorenzo Bundy	
2011	34–22	1st	Jody Reed	League Champs
2012	34–21	3rd	Matt Martin	
2013	34–22	2nd	P.J. Forbes	
2014	25–31	2nd	John Shoemaker	
2015	29–27	1st	Jack McDowell	
2016	33–22	1st	John Shoemaker	
2017	37–19	1st	John Shoemaker	
2018	37–18	1st	Mark Kertenian	League Champs
2019 Mota	33–23	1st	Jair Fernandez	
2019 Lasorda	27–29	3rd	Danny Dorn	
ACL Dodgers (2021–present)
2021	32–27	3rd	Tony Cappucilli	
2022	25–29	5th	Jair Fernandez	
2023	34–22	1st	Jair Fernandez	Lost League Finals
2024	40–20	1st	Juan Apodaca	League Champs
2025	29–31	4th	Juan Apodaca	

== Current roster ==
Arizona Complex League Dodgers roster
Players	Coaches/Other
Pitchers: 64 Aneudy Almonte; -- Devin Bell; 36 Alvaro Benua; 58 Tommy Case; -- Elijah Coston; 40 Yuliangel De La Cruz; -- Jack Giordano; -- Miles Gosztola; -- Wyatt Halvorson; 35 Adriano Marrero; -- Ian May; 70 Griff McGarry; 52 Franderly Morel; 22 Roiger Mujica; -- Cody New; -- Brady Pendley; 10 Nick Putnam; 51 Michael Ramirez; -- Ryne Rodriguez; 37 Williams Salazar; 59 Samuel Savinon; 59 Cesar Sanchez; -- Russell Sandefer; -- Ethan Sutton; 49 Jose Taveras; -- Gavin Van Kempen; -- Alex Walsh; -- Charlie West; -- Camden Wimbish; Catchers: -- Luke Bard; 61 Jhon Gil; 16 Eduardo Rojas; 17 Euri Rosa; Infielders: 54 Moises Acacio; 7 Moises Bolivar; 30 Bryan Gonzalez Garcia; 13 Harold Gonzalez; -- Elijah Ickes; -- Caleb Johnson; 3 Yojackson Laya; -- Bo Lowrance; 62 Reyll Mariano; 8 Elias Medina; 18 Daniel Mielcarek; Outfielders: 26 Agustin Acosta; 27 Jose Gonzalez; -- Aemed Nasser; 11 Leider Padilla; -- Kyeler Thompson	Manager: 86 Fumi Ishibashi; Coaches: -- Audy Ciriaco (Infield); -- Gage Crosgrove (Performance); -- Max DeLorme (Development); -- Juan Diaz (Hitting); -- Eduardo Dominguqez (Pitching); -- Cordell Hipolito (Bench); -- Ben Kim (Performance); -- Umar Male (Coach & bullpen catcher); -- Anthony Mulrine (Coach & bullpen catcher); -- Zach Reks (Hitting); 66 Andres Urbina (Pitching); 60-day injured list: -- Zach Bates; -- Oliver Gonzalez; -- Wyatt Halvorson; -- Davion Hickson; -- Sam Horn; -- Cullen McKay; 43 Christian Oliveira; -- Adrian Torres; 7-day injured list; * On Los Angeles Dodgers 40-man roster; ~ Development list; # Rehab assignment; ∞ Reserve list; ‡ Restricted list; § Suspended list; † Temporarily inactive list; Roster updated August 2, 2026; → More rosters: MiLB • Arizona Complex League; → Los Angeles Dodgers minor league players
