= Agency =

Agency may refer to:

== Organizations ==
- Institution, governmental or others
  - Advertising agency or marketing agency, a service business dedicated to creating, planning and handling advertising for its clients
  - Employment agency, a business that serves as a representative, acting on behalf of another
  - Escort agency, a company that provides escorts for clients, usually for sexual services
  - Government agency, a department of a local or national government responsible for the oversight and administration of a specific function
    - Central Intelligence Agency, nicknamed "The Agency"
  - International agency, an inter-governmental body
  - News agency
  - Photographic agency
  - Talent agency
- Highways Agency (now National Highways), manages motorways and some major roads in England

== Social science ==
- Agency, the abstract principle that autonomous beings, agents, are capable of acting by themselves; see Autonomy
- Agency (law), a person acting on behalf of another person
- Agency (moral), capacity for making moral judgments
- Agency (philosophy), the capacity of an autonomous agent to act, relating to action theory in philosophy
- Agency (psychology), the ability to act independently
- Agency (sociology), the ability of social actors to make independent choices, relating to action theory in sociology
- Agency and structure, ability of an individual to organize future situations and resource distribution

== Places ==
- Agency (administrative division)
- Agency, Iowa, US
- Agency, Missouri, US
- Agency, Montana, US
- Agency Township (disambiguation), name of townships in four US states

== Arts, entertainment and media ==
=== Film and television ===
- Agency (film), 1980 Canadian film starring Lee Majors
- The Agency (2001 TV series), an American action-drama
- The Agency (2007 TV series), an American reality series
- Morgana Robinson's The Agency, a 2016 British TV mockumentary
- The Agency, a fictional government organization in the 2000 TV series The Invisible Man
- Agency (South Korean TV series), a 2023 television series
- The Agency (2024 TV series), an American espionage thriller

=== Other media ===
- Agency (novel), a science fiction novel by William Gibson
- The Agency (comics)
- Agency (DC Comics), a fictional governmental organization
- The Agency: Covert Ops, a spy-themed massively multiplayer online shooter video game

== Other uses ==
- Agency in Mormonism, "the privilege of choice... introduced by God"
- Agency security, securities issued by government-sponsored enterprises, often simply referred to as "Agency"
- Agency debt, US government-sponsored agency bonds

== See also ==
- Agent (disambiguation)
- Free agency (disambiguation)
- Agency dilemma or principal–agent problem, in political science, supply chain management and economics
