= Agent =

Agent may refer to:

== Espionage, investigation, and law ==
- Espionage § Agents in espionage, spies or intelligence officers
- Law of agency, laws involving a person authorized to act on behalf of another
  - Agent of record, a person with a contractual agreement with an insurance policy owner
  - Election agent, a person responsible for the conduct of a political campaign
  - Free agent, a sports player who is eligible to sign with any club or franchise
  - Literary agent, an agent who represents writers and their written works
  - Modeling agency, a person or a corporation which represents fashion models
  - Press agent, a professional publicist
  - Foreign agent, a person who carries out the interests of a foreign country
  - Political agent (disambiguation)
  - Patent attorney, an attorney who represents clients in patent matters
  - Real estate agent, an intermediary between sellers and buyers of real estate
  - Registered agent, in the US, receives service of process for a party in a legal action
  - Shipping agent, a person responsible for handling shipments and cargo
  - Sports agent, a legal representative for professional sports figures such as athletes and coaches
  - Talent agent or booking agent, a person who finds jobs for entertainment professionals
  - Trade mark agent, a person who represents clients in trade mark matters
  - Travel agent, a retailer that provides travel and tourism related services
- Special agent, an American criminal investigator or detective for example

== Arts and entertainment ==
=== Fictional characters ===
- Agent (Marvel Comics), a Marvel Comics character
- Agent (The Matrix), a group of characters in the series
- The Agents, superhuman characters in Seven Samurai 20XX

=== Film and television ===
- The Agent (1922 film), featuring Oliver Hardy
- The Agent (2010 film), a short film
- Agent (film), a spy thriller film
- Agent (TV series), a Polish reality competition

=== Music ===
- Agent (band), an American hardcore band from Long Island, New York
- Agents (Finnish band), a Finnish schlager/rock'n'roll band
- The Agents (Australian band), led by James Griffin
- "Intro: The Agent", by Rhymefest from El Che (2010)
- "The Agent" (Little Man Tate song) (2006)

=== Other uses in arts and entertainment ===
- Agent (video game), a stealth action game

== Science and technology ==
=== Biology and chemistry ===
- Biological agent, a bacterium, virus, protozoan, parasite, or fungus used as a weapon
- Chemical agent, used as a chemical weapon

=== Computing ===
- Agent architecture, a blueprint for software agents and control systems
- Agent-based model, a computational model for simulating the actions and interactions of individuals
- Agentic AI, autonomous artificial intelligence that can make decisions and act on those decisions on its own
- Forté Agent, an email and Usenet news client
- Intelligent agent, an autonomous, goal-directed entity which observes and acts upon an environment
- Software agent, a piece of software that acts for a user or other program
- User agent, software that is acting on behalf of a user

== Other uses ==
- Agency (philosophy), the capacity of an actor to act in a given environment
- Agency (psychology), an attribute of humans and non-human animals
- Agent (economics), an actor and decision maker in a model
- Agent (grammar), in linguistics, the thematic relation of a cause or initiator to an event
- Agent noun, a word identifying an actor, derived from a word denoting an action
- Cleaning agent, a substance used to remove bad smells, clutter, dirt, dust, or stains on surfaces

== See also ==
- Agency (disambiguation)
- Agent 13 (disambiguation)
- Agent X (disambiguation)
- Bot (disambiguation)
- Get Smart, an American comedy TV series which parodies the secret agent genre
- Secret Agent (disambiguation)
