= John Shoemaker =

American baseball manager (born 1956)

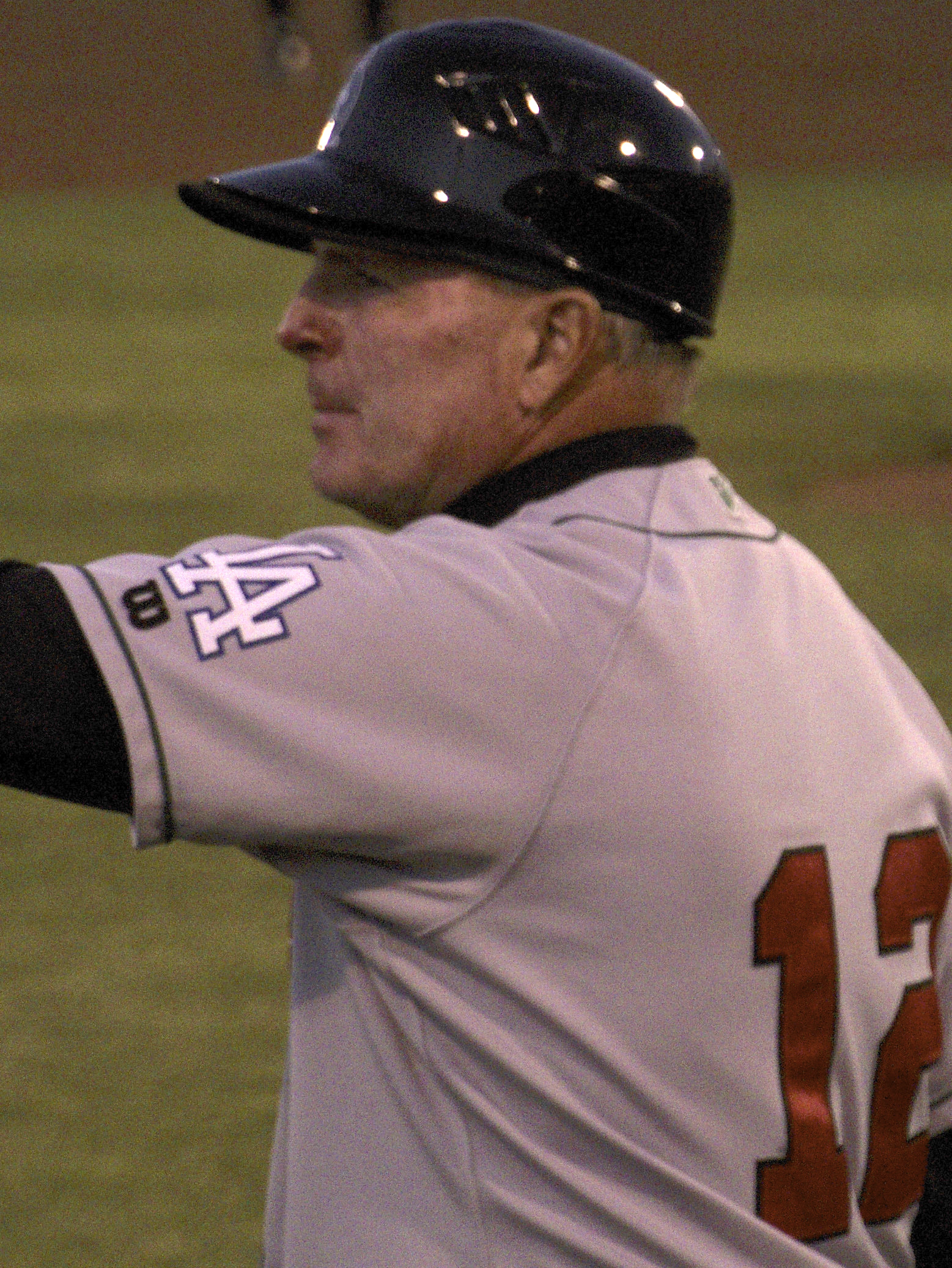
- Shoemaker with the Great Lakes Loons in 2012
- Minor league manager
- Born: August 18, 1956 (age 70); Chillicothe, Ohio, U.S.
- Bats: Left Throws: Right
- Stats at Baseball Reference

John Shoemaker (born August 18, 1956) is an American former minor league baseball player who is currently manager of the Ontario Tower Buzzers.

Shoemaker attended Waverly High School and Miami University before he was drafted in the 35th round of the 1977 MLB draft by the Los Angeles Dodgers. He was also drafted in the 6th round by the Chicago Bulls in the 1978 NBA draft. He played in the Dodgers minor league system, primarily as a second baseman, from 1977 to 1980, making it all the way up to AAA before retiring to become a coach after the 1981 season. Has been part of the Dodgers organization since 1977. The Dodgers named him "Captain of Player Development" in 2015 as recognition of his "continual demonstration of superior teammate behavior" according to the Dodgers head of player development, Gabe Kapler. At the end of the 2015 season, he was awarded with the Mike Coolbaugh Award presented by Minor League Baseball to the person "who has shown outstanding baseball work ethic, knowledge of the game and skill in mentoring young players on the field." He was also named to the Southern League Hall of Fame in 2016.

== Coaching/Managing career ==
- 1981–1986: Batting Coach for the Vero Beach Dodgers
- 1987–1988: Manager of the Vero Beach Dodgers
- 1989–1991: Manager of the San Antonio Missions - Lost in championship game in 1990
- 1992: Manager of the Gulf Coast Dodgers
- 1993: Manager of the Yakima Bears
- 1995: Manager of the Great Falls Dodgers
- 1996: Manager of the Savannah Sand Gnats - Won South Atlantic League Championship - AMF
- 1997–1998: Manager of the Vero Beach Dodgers
- 2000: Manager of the Vero Beach Dodgers
- 2001: Manager of the Jacksonville Suns - Won League Championship & Southern League Manager of the Year Award
- 2002: Minor League Defensive Instructor for the Los Angeles Dodgers
- 2003: Manager of the Las Vegas 51s
- 2004: Assistant Field Coordinator for the Los Angeles Dodgers
- 2005–2008: Manager of the Jacksonville Suns - Won League Championship in 2005
- 2009–2010: coordinator of the Los Angeles Dodgers training complex in Glendale, Arizona
- 2011–2012: Manager of the Great Lakes Loons
- 2013: coordinator of Arizona Instruction - Los Angeles Dodgers
- 2014: Manager of the Arizona League Dodgers
- 2015: Manager of the Ogden Raptors
- 2016–2017: Manager of the Arizona League Dodgers
- 2018–2020: Manager of the Great Lakes Loons
- 2021–2025: Manager of the Rancho Cucamonga Quakes
- 2026–present: Manager of the Ontario Tower Buzzers
- 2026: Manager of the Glendale Desert Dogs
