= JRTC =

JRTC may refer to:

- James R. Thompson Center, a building in Chicago, Illinois
- Joint Readiness Training Center, a U.S. Army training center at Fort Polk, Louisiana
- Jacksonville Regional Transportation Center at LaVilla, a transit station in Jacksonville, Florida
- Jackie Robinson Training Complex, part of the Historic Dodgertown athletic center
