= Juan Bustabad =

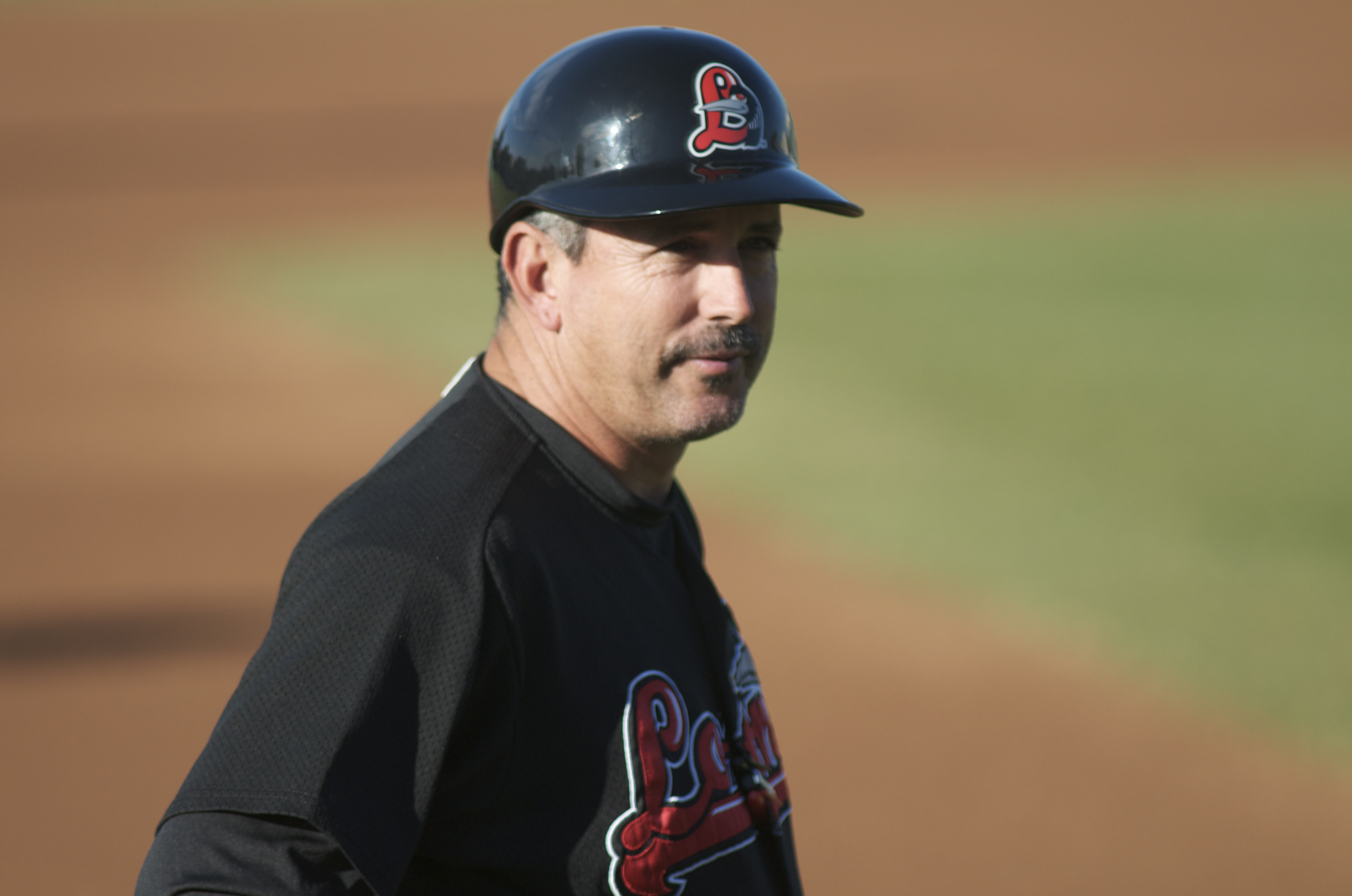
- Bustabad with the Great Lakes Loons in 2008
- Minor league manager
- Born: August 16, 1961 (age 64); Havana, Cuba
- Bats: Left Throws: Right
- Stats at Baseball Reference

Juan Bustabad (born August 16, 1961) is a Cuban minor league baseball player and manager.

== Playing career ==
Bustabad was a shortstop during his playing career. He graduated from Hialeah-Miami Lakes High School and attended Miami-Dade College. He was drafted by the Boston Red Sox in the 1st round of the 1980 MLB amateur player draft.

He began his professional career with the Winter Haven Red Sox in Single-A in 1980 and played in Boston's farm system through 1985, making stops in Bristol, Pawtucket and New Britain. He was signed by the Los Angeles Dodgers as a minor league free agent prior to the 1986 season and spent 2 1/2 seasons with the Double-A San Antonio Dodgers/Missions and half a season with Triple-A Albuquerque.

In 9 seasons of minor league baseball, he played in 1,002 games, finishing with a batting average of .247.

== Coaching career ==
- 1990: Coach – Yakima Bears
- 1991: Manager – Indios de Charallave
- 1992: Roving Infield Coach – Los Angeles Dodgers minor league system
- 1993: Coach – Lethbridge Mounties
- 1994–1996: Manager – Gulf Coast Marlins
- 1997: Manager – Utica Blue Sox
- 1998: Manager – Kane County Cougars
- 1999: Hitting Coach – Brevard County Manatees
- 2000: Manager – Great Falls Dodgers
- 2001: Manager – Gulf Coast Dodgers
- 2002: Manager – Vero Beach Dodgers
- 2003: Hitting Coach – Ogden Raptors
- 2004: Hitting Coach – Vero Beach Dodgers
- 2005: Manager – Ogden Raptors
- 2006–2007: Manager – Gulf Coast Dodgers
- 2008–2010: Manager – Great Lakes Loons
- 2011–2012: Manager – Rancho Cucamonga Quakes

He won his 700th career game as a manager on August 24, 2010, when the Great Lakes Loons beat the West Michigan Whitecaps 9-3. The win was on the same day that he was named the Midwest League Manager of the Year.

He was selected as the California League manager of the year in 2011 with the Rancho Cucamonga Quakes.
