= Your Call Football =

American football competition

- Classification: Developmental league
- Sport: American football
- Founded: 2017
- First season: 2018
- No. of teams: 2
- Countries: United States
- Website: YourCallFootball.com

Your Call Football was an interactive competition in which participants called plays in real time for a series of live exhibition American football games with players, some of whom have played in the NFL or CFL. The participants watch the game via live streaming media and use a smartphone app to select the plays. A series of three games were played in May 2018 at Historic Dodgertown in Vero Beach, Florida, and again in 2019 in Jacksonville, Florida, with cash prizes awarded in both series.

In February 2020, Your Call Football stated in an Instagram reply that it had no plans to host a 2020 competition as its parent company had moved on to adapting the technology in other sporting environments.

Fan Controlled Football, operated by an unrelated company, would also use a similar conceit of fans using apps to select plays in real times when it launched in 2021; FCF uses an indoor field as opposed to the full-sized field YCF used.

== Founding and development ==
In 2013, Forrester Research CEO George F. Colony devised the concept for Your Call Football. Colony's concept was to give fans the power to control the outcome of live, professional football games.

In September 2017, the company was awarded a patent for its fan play-calling technology. The company announced the awarding of two additional patents for live fan play-calling and the associated scoring algorithm in March 2018. The company also was amenable to having its technology licensed by the NFL for events like the Pro Bowl.

== Gameplay ==
=== On-field rules ===
The game on the field follows a similar format to that of the NFL, with 11 players on each side of the ball. The main rule differences for Your Call Football games include:

- A 45-second play clock to allow time for fan voting
- No kickoffs
- No punts

=== Participant interaction and scoring ===
Prior to each offensive snap, the head coach sends a list of three possible plays for voting to participants' mobile devices. The play with the most votes is executed on the field, and the subsequent results either earn or lose points.

Fans who pick the selected play receive a "Field Score". The scoring system works similarly to that of fantasy football, in which fans can earn or lose points depending on a play's result. A loss of yards or a turnover results in negative points, while a yard-gaining completion or run earns points.

Examples of field score include:

- 0.1 points per yard gained
- 6 points for a touchdown
- -3 points for an interception
- -3 points for a fumble

Users voting for a different play are not impacted by the result, but can earn "Against the Grain" points if the play results in a negative outcome on the field. Fans can also receive "Coach Pick" bonus points for picking the play that the head coach would have selected. The coach's pick does not overrule the fan-selected vote.

Fans' scores are calculated after every play based on the results on the field, and fans with the highest scores on the leaderboard at the end of the half, game and series win cash prizes.

== 2018 series ==
Your Call Football's inaugural series began May 3, 2018 at Historic Dodgertown in Vero Beach, Florida, when its two teams, Power and Grit, competed for the first of three weekly matchups. The teams were composed of former NFL and college players and were coached by former Green Bay Packers and Montreal Alouettes head coach Mike Sherman and former Pittsburgh Steelers running back and ESPN analyst Merril Hoge.

The series was streamed on YCF's app and website, and also on YouTube. The on-air broadcasters included Jabari Greer, Jennifer Hale and Justin Kutcher.

YCF reported that more than 46,000 fans streamed the games, and more than 295,000 offensive plays were called. Approximately $50,000 in cash prizes was distributed over the course of the series.

Games

Date	Team	score	opponent	score	Ref
April 25	Grit	14	Power	15	
May 3	Grit	12	Power	20	
May 10	Grit	0	Power	20	
May 17	Grit	6	Power	15	

== 2019 series ==
The company announced in January 2019 that it would hold a second series beginning February 25 and run for four weeks. The games were held at Dream Finders Homes Flex Field at Daily's Place in Jacksonville, Florida. In addition to $72,000 of cash prizes to be awarded after each quarter, game and for the entire 4 game series, the company announced a "$1 Million Perfect Game" for fans who earn the maximum number of points possible during any one of the four games.

One of the teams was again coached by Merril Hoge, while current broadcaster for Sky Sports and former NFL teammate of Hoge's, Solomon Wilcots, took the place of Mike Sherman. Team Grit won 3 of the 4 games in the series behind the stellar play of former NCAA and James Madison University standout, Vad Lee.

For the 2019 series, the XFL used Your Call Football to test proposed rules changes for its inaugural season in 2020.

Games

Game	Team	score	opponent	score	Ref
Game 1	Grit	14	Power	0	
Game 2	Grit	16	Power	12	
Game 3	Grit	18	Power	15	
Game 4	Grit	6	Power	11	

== Notable players ==
Many of the players on the two YCF rosters had played professional football in either the CFL or the NFL. Notable players included wide receiver Robert Meachem, who played in the NFL from 2007 through 2014 as a member of the New Orleans Saints and San Diego Chargers. Meachem was one of four Super Bowl champions in the league, along with B. J. Daniels (Seattle Seahawks), Bernard Pierce and Tommy Streeter (both as members of the Baltimore Ravens).

According to the Associated Press, a number of players from Your Call Football's 2018 roster attended NFL minicamps or ended up on NFL or CFL rosters after the series.

In 2019, the YCF rosters were made up of many returning players from the original showcase, with additional former Division 1 and NFL mini camp players joining for the new series.
