= Minor League Baseball Umpire Training Academy =

Coordinates: 27°38′40″N 80°25′36″W

- Vero Beach, Florida; United States

Information
- Established: 4 January 2012
- Website: www.milbumpireacademy.com

The Minor League Baseball Umpire Training Academy provides umpire training and development for umpires in Minor League Baseball since 2012. Since Minor League Baseball Umpire Development's inception in 1997, every umpire hired by Major League Baseball has come through the Minor League Baseball Umpire Development system.

== Facilities ==
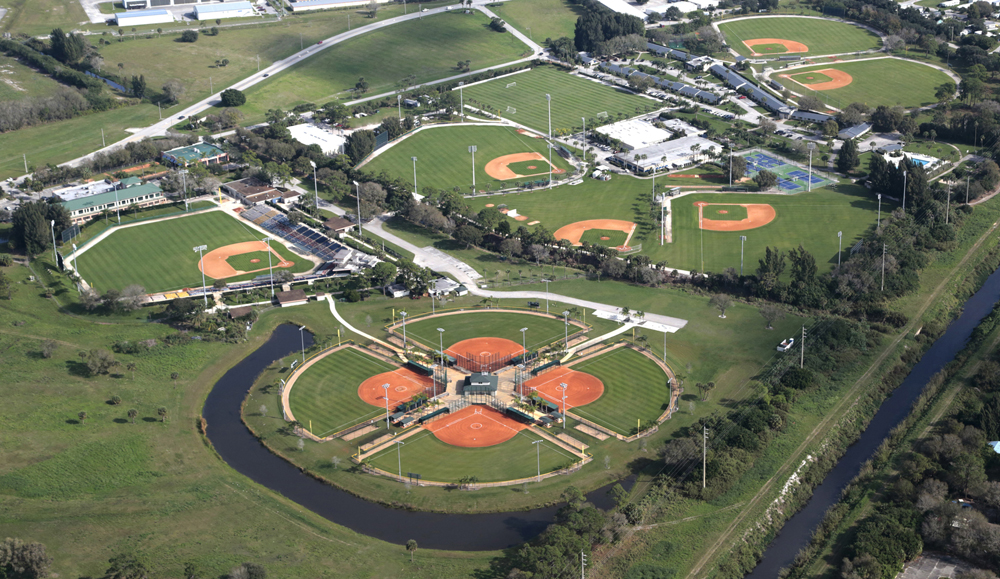
Minor League Baseball Umpire Training Academy Facilities at Historic Dodgertown in Vero Beach, Florida

The Minor League Baseball Umpire Training Academy is located at the Historic Dodgertown sports facility in Vero Beach, Florida. The campus includes classrooms, a Triple-A-level-approved stadium, four full-size baseball fields, eight indoor batting and pitching tunnels, 32 mounds/home plates for plate instruction, as well as a 60-yard agility and warm-up area and a mini-field used for base work. The campus also contains a weight room, locker rooms, four lighted tennis courts, a competition-size swimming pool, lighted tennis/basketball courts and a sand volleyball court. Historic Dodgertown-Vero Beach includes on-site housing and dining options for Umpire Training Academy students.

== Entrance requirements ==
To be accepted to the Minor League Baseball Umpire Training Academy, individuals must be at least 18 years of age and in good physical condition. Candidates are not required to have prior experience in umpiring, as all students receive the same comprehensive training and evaluation. Applicants must submit a signed enrollment contract to complete the registration process and submit a minimum $200 deposit in order to be enrolled in the course.

== Curriculum ==
Minor League Baseball Umpire Training Academy students receive 216 hours of instruction which is separated into three areas: classroom, field work, and plate work. Topics covered include effort and professionalism, base instruction, plate instruction and game and situation management.

== Graduation requirements ==
Students at the Minor League Baseball Umpire Training Academy are graded on an overall pass or fail system for each course, based on satisfactory progress in the core competency areas and written examination scores. Upon satisfactory completion of the program, students are awarded a Certificate of Training.

== MiLB Advanced Course ==
Top candidates from each Minor League Baseball Umpire Training Academy session are chosen to attend the MiLB Advanced Course, which takes place immediately following the Umpire Training Academy.

== Staff ==
The core instruction staff of the Minor League Baseball Umpire Training Academy has considerable professional umpire experience, including at the Major League Baseball level. The Umpire Training Academy provides low student-to-instructor ratios.
