= Enemy of the State (film) =

1998 film by Tony Scott

- Theatrical release poster
- Directed by: Tony Scott
- Written by: David Marconi
- Produced by: Jerry Bruckheimer
- Starring: Will Smith; Gene Hackman; Jon Voight; Regina King; Loren Dean; Jake Busey; Barry Pepper; Gabriel Byrne
- Cinematography: Dan Mindel
- Edited by: Chris Lebenzon
- Music by: Trevor Rabin; Harry Gregson-Williams
- Production companies: Touchstone Pictures; Jerry Bruckheimer Films; Scott Free Productions
- Distributed by: Buena Vista Pictures Distribution
- Release date: November 20, 1998
- Running time: 132 minutes
- Country: United States
- Language: English
- Budget: $90 million
- Box office: $250.8 million

Enemy of the State is a 1998 American political action thriller film directed by Tony Scott, produced by Jerry Bruckheimer and written by David Marconi. The film stars Will Smith as a labor lawyer who becomes the target of a covert surveillance operation after unwittingly receiving evidence of a political assassination. Gene Hackman co-stars as a former intelligence operative who helps him evade the rogue agents. The supporting cast includes Jon Voight, Regina King, Loren Dean, Jake Busey, Barry Pepper, and Gabriel Byrne.

The film was released theatrically in the United States on November 20, 1998, by Buena Vista Pictures through its Touchstone Pictures label. It was a commercial success, grossing $250.8 million worldwide against a budget of $90 million. The film received generally positive reviews from critics, who praised its fast-paced direction, original story, timely subject matter, and the performances of Smith and Hackman.

== Plot ==
Congressman Phil Hammersley opposes a proposed counterterrorism bill that would significantly expand surveillance powers for American intelligence agencies, arguing that it poses a threat to civil liberties. In response, National Security Agency (NSA) Director Thomas Reynolds, who supports the bill and stands to benefit professionally from its passage, orders Hammersley's assassination. His team stages the murder as a fatal car accident brought on by a heart attack.

Meanwhile, labor lawyer Robert Clayton Dean is working on a case involving racketeer Paulie Pintero, leveraging a videotape — obtained through a surveillance contact known only as "Brill" — to ensure Pintero agrees to his terms. At the same time, wildlife biologist Daniel Zavitz discovers footage of Hammersley's murder captured by a remote camera; Reynolds sends his team after him. A panicking Zavitz runs into Dean (an old college acquaintance) and manages to slip the incriminating disc into his shopping bag before getting struck and killed in traffic. Reynolds' team finds Dean's business card on Zavitz's corpse and wrongly assumes that he knows about the tape.

NSA agents impersonating police officers attempt to enter Dean's home without a search warrant. When Dean stops them, the agents later break in and plant surveillance devices in his clothes and personal effects. They also publicize false evidence linking Dean to money laundering and an affair with Rachel Banks, Dean's ex-girlfriend and Brill's courier. Dean loses his job, has his car and bank account seized by the IRS, and gets kicked out of his home by his wife Carla.

Desperate, Dean calls Rachel to get in touch with Brill. The NSA intercept the call and send an impostor, but the real Brill intervenes. Brill — revealed to be Edward Lyle, a former NSA communications expert in hiding — removes the bugs on Dean's clothes and reveals the NSA's involvement. Dean starts a fire in a hotel to distract Reynolds' henchmen and is chased through a tunnel and a sewer to evade them. He then finds that Rachel has been murdered and evidence planted to frame him as the killer. Heartbroken, Dean recovers the original disc and brings it to Lyle, who identifies Reynolds as the mastermind. However, their hideout is raided and blown up, and the disc is destroyed.

Lyle reveals his background: he once worked in Iran during the revolution and escaped after his partner, Rachel's father, was killed. Convinced that someone in his own agency betrayed them, he has since lived off grid. While Lyle urges Dean to disappear, Dean insists on exposing Reynolds and clearing his name. They record Congressman Sam Albert, a supporter of the surveillance bill, in a compromising situation, then manipulate Reynolds into believing he is being blackmailed. They lure him into a meeting under the pretense of trading the tape.

At the meeting, Dean deceives Reynolds by claiming the tape is concealed at Pintero's restaurant, which is under federal surveillance. Reynolds confronts Pintero, who misinterprets the demand as a threat involving separate evidence; unfortunately, a massive shootout ensues between the gangsters and the NSA agents, leaving most of the participants dead. Lyle streams the confrontation to the FBI, prompting a raid that ends the standoff. Reynolds' involvement is exposed, the survivors are apprehended, and Dean is rescued.

In the aftermath, the surveillance bill is canceled by American federal legislators, the NSA covers up Reynolds' rogue operation, and Dean is exonerated of all charges. He reunites with Carla and their son Eric. Lyle, having retreated again, sends Dean a covert farewell message via television, showing himself enjoying life in a tropical hideaway.

== Cast ==
- Will Smith as Robert Clayton Dean
- Gene Hackman as Edward Lyle / Brill
- Jon Voight as NSA Director Thomas Reynolds
- Regina King as Carla Dean
- Loren Dean as Hicks
- Jake Busey as Krug
- Barry Pepper as Pratt
- Jason Lee as Daniel Zavitz
- Gabriel Byrne as NSA Agent / Fake Brill
- Lisa Bonet as Rachel Banks
- Jack Black as Fiedler
- Jamie Kennedy as Williams
- Scott Caan as Jones

The cast also includes Stuart Wilson as Congressman Sam Albert, Laura Cayouette as Christa Hawkins, James LeGros as Jerry Miller, Dan Butler as NSA Deputy Director Jack Shaffer, Anna Gunn as Emily Reynolds, Jascha Washington as Eric Dean, Lillo Brancato and John Capodice as restaurant workers, Ivana Milicevic as a lingerie store clerk, Arthur J. Nascarella as Frankie, Grant Heslov as Lenny, and Lennox Brown as a tunnel maintenance worker. Portraying members of Reynolds' NSA team are Ian Hart as Bingham, Bodhi Elfman as Van, and an uncredited Seth Green as Selby. Jason Robards, Jr., Tom Sizemore, and Philip Baker Hall make uncredited appearances as Congressman Phillip Hammersley, Paulie Pintero, and Mark Silverberg, respectively. Donna W. Scott, director Tony Scott's wife, plays Jenny. Larry King appears as himself.

== Production ==
Principal photography for Enemy of the State took place primarily in Baltimore, Maryland, with additional scenes set in Washington, D.C. Filming began with location shoots on a ferry in the Fell's Point neighborhood. In mid-January 1998, the production relocated to Los Angeles, where filming continued through April of that year.

Screenwriter David Marconi developed the original script over a period of two years while working under producer Jerry Bruckheimer at Don Simpson/Jerry Bruckheimer Films, with development overseen by executive Lucas Foster. Director Oliver Stone initially expressed interest in the project, but Bruckheimer ultimately selected Tony Scott, continuing their long-standing collaboration. Uncredited rewrites were later contributed by Aaron Sorkin, Henry Bean, and Tony Gilroy.

Casting considerations for the lead role included Mel Gibson and Tom Cruise, before the part ultimately went to Will Smith, who was eager to work alongside Gene Hackman and reunite with Bruckheimer following their collaboration on Bad Boys (1995). As a result of his casting, Smith chose not to star in Snake Eyes (1998). George Clooney was also reportedly considered for a role. Sean Connery was approached for the role of Edward Lyle, which eventually went to Hackman. Regina King was added to the cast in September 1997. Two months later in November, it was confirmed that Jason Lee would portray a supporting role in the film.

The film is notable for including several actors—later known for more prominent roles—in minor supporting parts. Casting director Victoria Thomas attributed this to the appeal of working with Hackman. A technical surveillance counter-measures consultant was brought onto the crew to advise on authenticity and appeared in a cameo as a spy shop clerk.

In a nod to Hackman's earlier work, Lyle's NSA personnel file features a photo of the actor from The Conversation (1974), a similarly themed espionage thriller.

== Soundtrack ==
The film's soundtrack album, titled Enemy of the State (Soundtrack from the Motion Picture) and featuring Harry Gregson-Williams and Trevor Rabin's musical score, was recorded at Arctic Circle Studios in Iceland and Todd-AO Scoring Stage in Hollywood, California and was released on 24 November 1998 by Hollywood Records.

== Release ==
Enemy of the State was distributed by Buena Vista Pictures through its Touchstone Pictures label, and released on November 20, 1998.

=== Home media ===
The film was released on VHS, Laserdisc and DVD on June 15, 1999. A demo tape for the VHS version was released in March 1999. The film received a Blu-ray release on November 21, 2006.

== Reception ==
=== Box office ===
Enemy of the State grossed $20 million from 2,393 theaters during its opening weekend, with a per-theater average of $8,374 at the domestic box office, placing it in second place behind The Rugrats Movie ($27 million). For its second weekend, it finished in third place behind A Bug's Life and The Rugrats Movie, collecting $18 million combined with a five-day Thanksgiving gross of $25.7 million. The film then made $9.5 million in its third weekend, maintaining the number three spot below A Bug's Life and Psycho.

Despite not topping the box office, Enemy of the State still managed to outgross The Rugrats Movie both domestically and internationally, as it went on to gross $111.5 million in the United States and Canada and $139.3 million in other territories, for a worldwide total of $250.8 million. The film was produced on a budget of $90 million, making it a commercial success.

=== Critical response ===
Enemy of the State received generally favorable reviews from critics. On Rotten Tomatoes, Enemy of the State holds an approval rating of 71% based on 82 reviews, with an average score of 6.9/10. The website's critical consensus reads: "An entertaining, topical thriller that finds director Tony Scott on solid form and Will Smith confirming his action headliner status." On Metacritic, it has a score of 67 out of 100 based on 22 critics, indicating "generally favorable reviews". Audiences polled by CinemaScore gave the film an average grade of "A−" on an A+ to F scale.

Kenneth Turan of the Los Angeles Times praised the film's style and energy, noting that its "pizazz overcomes occasional lapses in moment-to-moment plausibility." Janet Maslin of The New York Times commended the action set-pieces but criticized its adherence to the formulaic tendencies of the Simpson-Bruckheimer production style. David Sterritt of The Christian Science Monitor gave the film a two out of four scoring, stating that "the movie has plenty of high-tech power, spinning out action so explosive you'll hardly notice how preposterous the story is or how cardboard-thin the characters are." Edvins Beitiks of the San Francisco Examiner echoed similar praise for its technical execution while questioning the realism of its portrayal of government surveillance capabilities.

Roger Ebert of the Chicago Sun-Times awarded the film three out of four stars, writing that although the climax "edges perilously close to the ridiculous," the film remains engaging, highlighting strong performances by Jon Voight and Gene Hackman.

Film critic Kim Newman observed that Enemy of the State acts as a thematic continuation of The Conversation (1974), noting Hackman's portrayal of a similarly reclusive surveillance expert, and suggesting an intentional intertextual link between the two films.

== Accolades ==
| Award | Date of the ceremony | Category | Recipients | Result | Ref. |
|---|---|---|---|---|---|
| NAACP Image Awards | 14 February 1999 | Outstanding Motion Picture | Enemy of the State | Nominated | |
| NAACP Image Awards | 14 February 1999 | Outstanding Actor in a Motion Picture | Will Smith | Nominated | |
| NAACP Image Awards | 14 February 1999 | Outstanding Actress in a Motion Picture | Regina King | Nominated | |
| MTV Movie & TV Awards | 5 June 1999 | Best Actor in a Movie | Will Smith | Nominated | |
| Teen Choice Awards | 1 August 1999 | Choice Movie – Drama | Enemy of the State | Nominated | |
| Teen Choice Awards | 1 August 1999 | Choice Movie Actor | Will Smith | Nominated | |

== Undeveloped television series ==
In October 2016, ABC announced it had green-lit a television series sequel to the film, with Bruckheimer to return as producer. The series would take place two decades after the original film, where "an elusive NSA spy is charged with leaking classified intelligence, an idealistic female attorney must partner with a hawkish FBI agent to stop a global conspiracy".

== Real life ==
=== Public perception and NSA response ===
The film portrayed the National Security Agency (NSA) as possessing near-omniscient surveillance capabilities. In a PBS Nova episode titled "The Spy Factory", intelligence experts clarified that while the NSA can intercept communications, the process of connecting and analyzing such data is far more complex than depicted in the film.

General Michael Hayden, who became NSA Director shortly after the film's release, expressed concern over the public's perception shaped by the movie. He remarked, "I made the judgment that we couldn't survive with the popular impression of this agency being formed by the last Will Smith movie." According to journalist James Risen in his book State of War: The Secret History of the CIA and the Bush Administration, Hayden was "appalled" by the film's depiction and initiated a public relations campaign to counteract the image presented.

=== Prescience and cultural impact ===
Following the September 11 attacks and the enactment of the USA Patriot Act, as well as the 2013 revelations by Edward Snowden regarding the NSA's PRISM and Boundless Informant programs, Enemy of the State has been retrospectively regarded as prescient. The disclosures revealed extensive electronic surveillance capabilities, including the collection of emails, phone calls, and browsing data, both domestically and internationally.

In a 2013 article for The Guardian, journalist John Patterson argued that films like Enemy of the State and Echelon Conspiracy (2009) helped normalize the concept of ubiquitous government surveillance in popular culture. He suggested that such Hollywood thrillers may have "softened up" public opinion to accept the reality of mass data collection and diminished privacy in the digital age.

== See also ==
- List of films featuring surveillance
- List of American films of 1998
