= Secret Agent Man =

Secret Agent Man may refer to:

- Secret Agent Man (TV series), an American TV series that aired in 2000
- "Secret Agent Man" (Johnny Rivers song), a song written by Steve Barri and P. F. Sloan used as the opening theme for American broadcast of the TV series Danger Man
- "Secret Agent Man" (The Superjesus song), 2002
- Danger Man, a British TV series broadcast as Secret Agent in the U.S. from 1964 to 1966, sometimes erroneously referred to as Secret Agent Man (due to the words contained in the theme song).

== See also ==
- Secret Agent (disambiguation)
