= Free agent (disambiguation) =

A free agent is an athlete who is not under contract to a specific team, or whose contract allows him or her to solicit offers from other teams.

Free agent, Free Agent, or FreeAgent can also refer to:

== Music ==
- Free Agent (album), a 2010 album by rapper Joell Ortiz
- Free Agents, a Bay Area rap group who released an album titled Negotiations

== Television ==
- Free Agents, a 2009 English TV series starring Stephen Mangan
- Free Agents (American TV series), a 2011 American workplace sitcom starring Hank Azaria
- The Challenge: Free Agents, season 25 of the MTV reality game show

== Other uses ==
- Free agency (Major League Baseball), the concept of free agency as implemented in one particular baseball league
- Free Agent (novel), the first Paul Dark novel by Jeremy Duns
- Free agent (business), someone who works independently for oneself, rather than a single employer
- An individual capable of exercising free will
- A version of the Usenet client Forté Agent
- FreeAgent (software), an online accounting system
- Seagate FreeAgent, a line of external hard disks marketed by Seagate Technology

== See also ==
- Agent (disambiguation)
- Agency (disambiguation)
