= Holman Stadium (Vero Beach) =

Baseball stadium in Florida, US

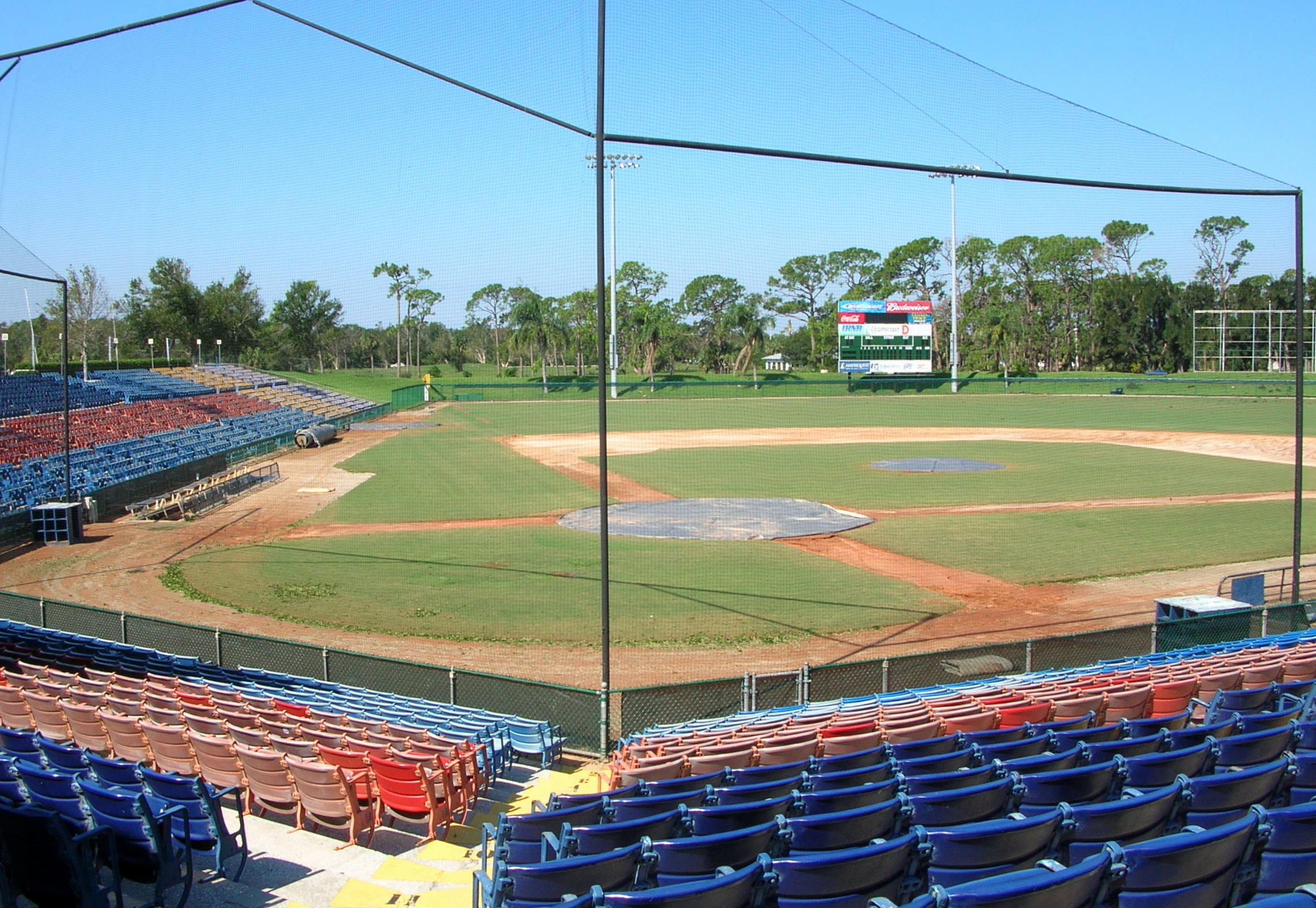
- Holman Stadium 2005
- Interactive map of Holman Stadium
- Location: 3901 26th St., Vero Beach, Florida
- Coordinates: 27°38′40″N 80°25′36″W
- Owner: County of Indian River
- Capacity: 6,500
- Surface: Grass
- Field size: Left – 340 ft Center – 400 ft Right – 340 ft

Construction
- Built: 1953
- Opened: 1953
- Renovated: 2020
- Cost: $63,000

Holman Stadium is a baseball stadium in Vero Beach, Florida, built in 1953 from an abandoned naval base, to accommodate spring training for the Brooklyn Dodgers as part of a complex now called Historic Dodgertown. In addition to the Dodgers' spring games, it was the home of the Vero Beach Devil Rays, previously the Vero Beach Dodgers, of the Florida State League, through the 2008 season. The official seating capacity is 6,500.

== History ==
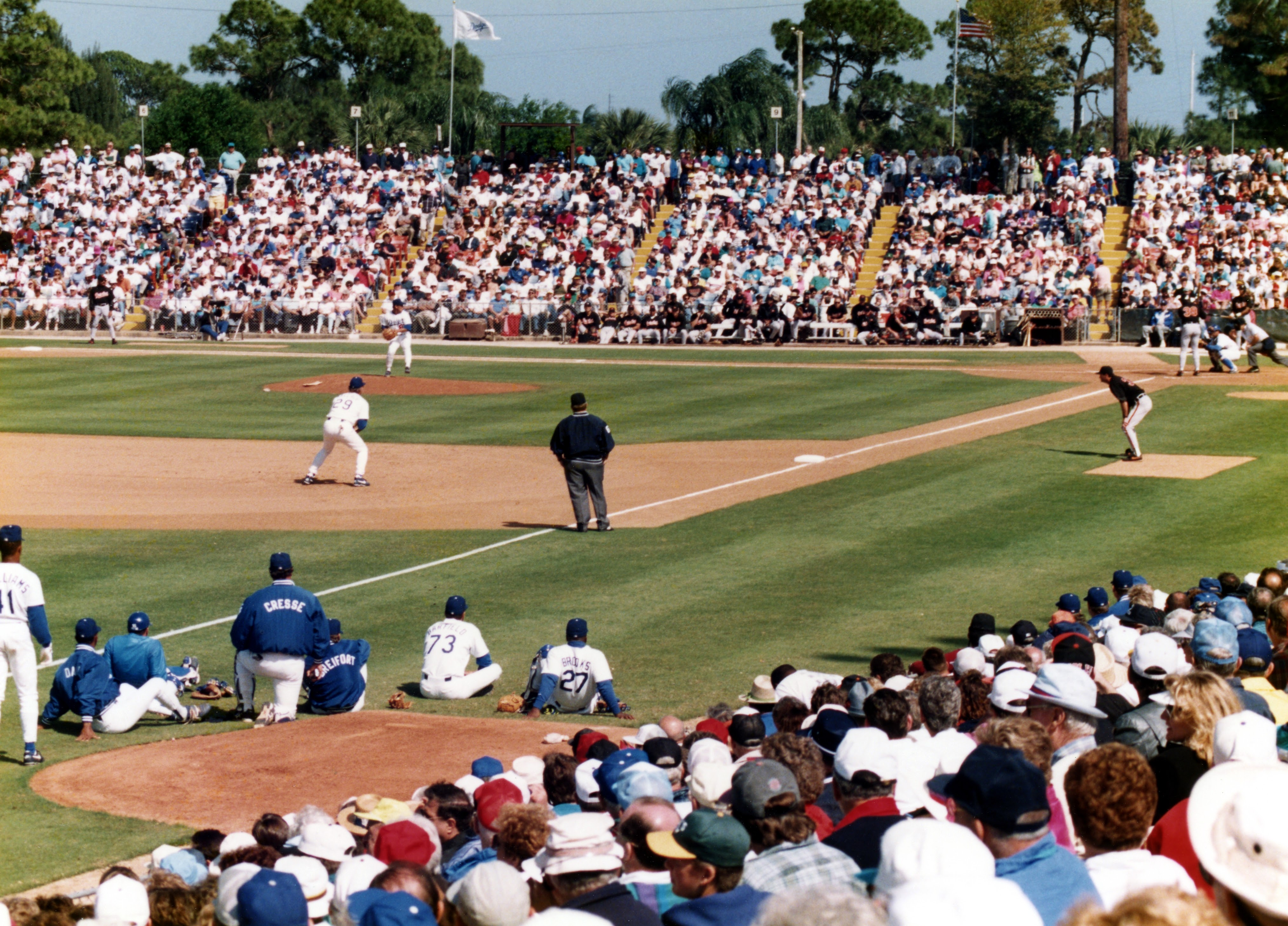
A Grapefruit League spring training game between the Dodgers and the Baltimore Orioles at Holman Stadium in 1994

The then-Brooklyn Dodgers were one of the first major league baseball teams to conduct spring training in Florida, establishing their operations in this quiet beachside town in 1948. Previously an abandoned Naval base, the complex was transformed for the Dodgers. Historic Dodgertown and Holman Stadium served as their spring home for more than 60 years. In recent decades, Arizona has established itself alongside Florida as the second major center for spring baseball, and the Dodgers were the last Western team in Major League Baseball to still conduct their spring training in Florida, having retained their spring training home even after the team moved to Los Angeles in 1958.

In 2001, the Dodgers seriously considered moving their spring training operations to Arizona, but the city of Vero Beach persuaded them to stay by purchasing the Historic Dodgertown complex from the team and leasing it back for a nominal $1 per year. In 2006, the Dodgers again received offers from several Arizona cities, attempting to persuade them to move. Ultimately, the offers were too lucrative to overcome the burden of having to reimburse Vero Beach for purchasing the complex. With the Camelback Ranch opening in Glendale in 2009, the Dodgers joined the Chicago White Sox to share the new facility. The Dodgers' last spring training game in Vero Beach was on March 17, 2008.

Holman is unique for its open-air dugouts that are literally dug out along the sides of the field. These may have been the inspiration for the dugouts in Johnny Hart's B.C. comic strip. "This place is so different from any other park", states George Betscha, a batboy at Dodgertown from 2005–2008. "There is so much history here and you can feel it when you walk around."

In addition to baseball, the Holman Stadium complex and conference center has hosted training sessions by the New Orleans Saints, the Green Bay Packers, the Cleveland Browns, the Buffalo Bills, the New England Patriots, the Kansas City Chiefs, the Philadelphia Eagles, and the college teams of the Miami Hurricanes, the Ohio State Buckeyes and the University of South Florida Bulls. Holman Stadium has also played host to some international teams such as the Yomiuri Giants, the Chunichi Dragons, the Osaka Buffaloes (Japan), the Samsung Lions, the LG Twins, the SK Wyverns, the Sinon Bulls Taiwanese team, the Nigeria national baseball team, and the Moscow Red Devils. Outside of sports, on March 31, 1961 at 7:30 p.m., famed evangelist Dr. Billy Graham held a Good Friday service at Holman Stadium during his Florida Crusades.

The Baltimore Orioles were recruited to move up to Vero Beach in 2010, from their spring home in Fort Lauderdale, but after failing to reach an agreement, the City of Vero Beach rescinded its offer.

The city is exploring other options outside of Major League Baseball spring training. Reports surfaced in 2009 that the Major League Baseball Players Association was considering Holman Stadium as an alternate training site for players who entered the spring as unsigned free agents. However, the MLBPA decided not to go forward with the plan.

As of 2025, nearby Dodgertown Elementary School has not changed its name.

The United Football League expressed an early interest in using the Historic Dodgertown facility as a training and practice grounds, but no agreement to do so was ever reached. During the final (2012) season, each team utilized a training site in or near its home market.

Dodgertown became the Vero Beach Sports Village in 2010. It is now used for sports tournaments including baseball and football tournaments, concerts and other special events. In 2013, former Dodger owner Peter O'Malley and current Dodger ownership, headed by President Stan Kasten, reached agreement to re-brand Vero Beach Sports Village under the name Historic Dodgertown. Historic Dodgertown now holds year round youth sports tournaments in baseball, soccer, lacrosse, and Minor League Baseball's Umpire Training Academy.
