= Agent 13: The Serpentine Assassin =

1986 book by Flint Dille and David Marconi

The Serpentine Assassin
- The Serpentine Assassin cover
- Author: Flint Dille, David Marconi
- Cover artist: Jeff Butler
- Language: English
- Series: Agent 13: The Midnight Avenger
- Genre: Juvenile
- Publisher: TSR, Inc.
- Publication date: 1986
- Publication place: United States
- Media type: Print (Paperback)
- Pages: 192
- ISBN: 0-88038-282-1
- OCLC: 13691170
- Preceded by: Agent 13: The Invisible Empire
- Followed by: Agent 13: Acolytes of Darkness

The Serpentine Assassin is the second of the short series of fast-paced, action-based adventure of Agent 13: The Midnight Avenger, written by Flint Dille and David Marconi in a style reminiscent of popular 1930s pulps. It picked up directly from the story where the previous book, The Invisible Empire, ended.

The eponymous title referred to Agent 13, brainwashed after he was captured by the Brotherhood, though it had appeared to his ally, Maggie Darr, that he drowned in the icy Atlantic waters.

== Plot summary ==
Due to damages suffered, the SS Normandie was forced to turn around and sail back towards New York. On board, fighting back fears and tears as she watched the waters which she believed claimed the man she loved, Maggie Darr swore to continue his fight against the Brotherhood, despite the impossible odds.

Unknown to herself, she still had allies she knew nothing about back in New York, watching over her as she made her way back to Agent 13's lair. Also, unknown to her, China White had Agent 13 fished out of the waters, and despite him almost being dead, managed to arrange for him to be secretly transported back to the headquarters of the Brotherhood.

In New York, Maggie reviewed the situation and decided to approach Kent Walters, the National Security Advisor who was recuperating in the Bethesda Naval Hospital. Walters had been injured during the events in the first book, ambushed along with Agent 13 by Brotherhood's assassins, which saw the massacre of all other members of the National Security Council. She managed to gain Walters' cooperation, who suggested she investigate General Hunter Braddock who was in charge of the Lightning Gun project. Braddock was also involved with China White in her diva persona.

Meanwhile, Agent 13 was brought back from the brink of death, and told frankly by his former mentor, Jinda-dii, High Priest of the Serpentine Assassins, that he would be brainwashed to be the assassin the Brotherhood was training him to be, and be sent on a mission where he would die at the end of the job. He resisted valiantly, and for a brief moment, felt an unexpected support from an unknown source during the battling for his mind. Yet in the end, he could not prevail and his nemesis, Itsu, cackled gleefully.

Tredekka, the original name given to Agent 13 by the Brotherhood, was sent on the spitefully vicious mission to murder Maggie Darr. He was programmed to remember his brainwashing at the completion of his mission, moments before the mantha, the oil of fire he drank before departure, would trigger upon his "success" to combust and consume him, giving him just enough time to fully comprehend the awful horror of what he did to the woman who loved him.

Ignorant of the impending doom, Maggie Darr was working feverishly to investigate the disasters to which the Masque claimed responsibility, unearthing clues which linked the events together in a previously unnoticed pattern, providing clues to an emerging, still vague, but unmistakably ominous picture.
