= Solomon Wilcots =

American football player, television analyst, and broadcaster (born 1964)

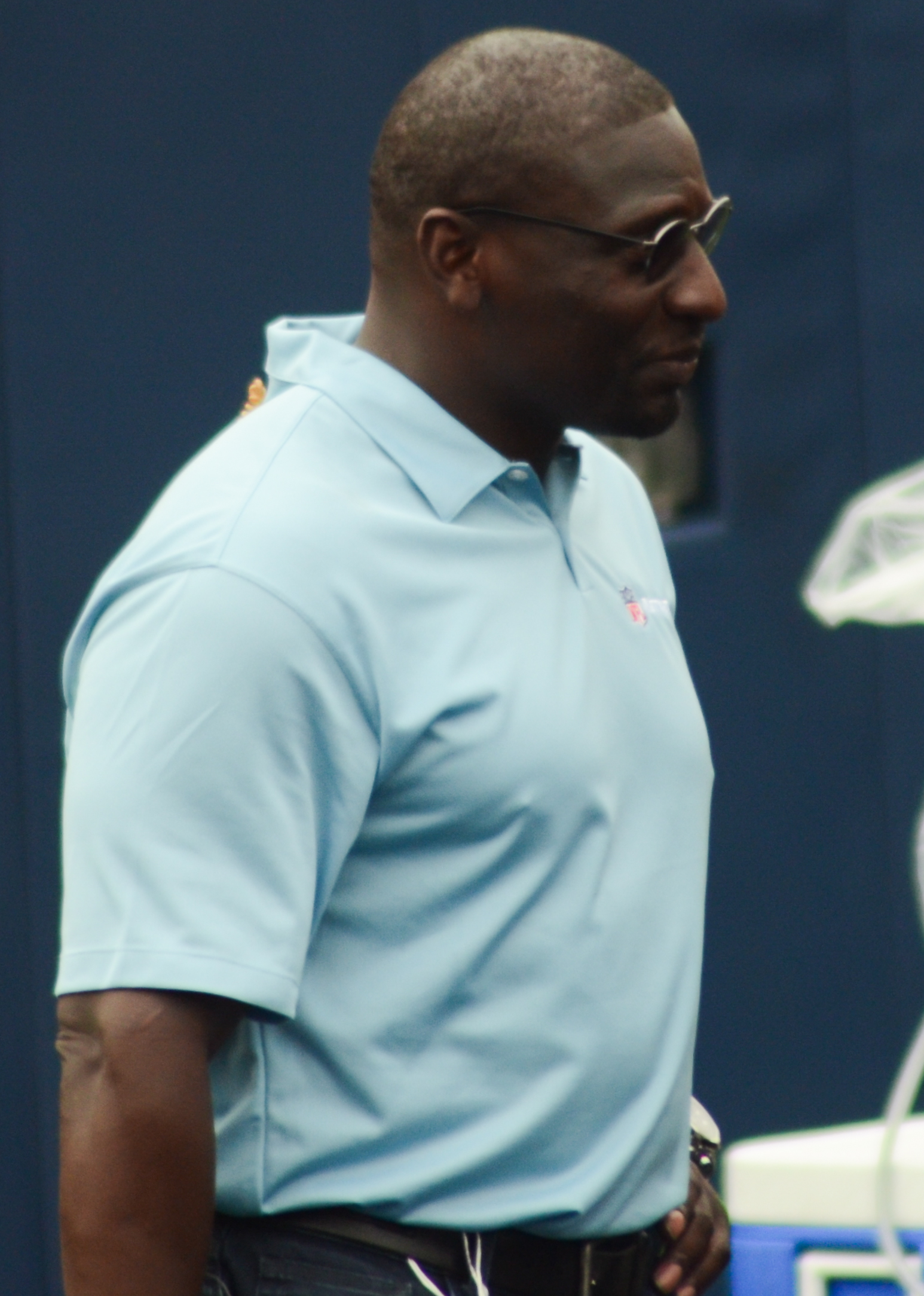
- Wilcots in 2014

No. 41
- Position: Safety

Personal information
- Born: October 9, 1964 (age 62); Los Angeles, California, U.S.
- Listed height: 5 ft 11 in (1.80 m)
- Listed weight: 180 lb (82 kg)

Career information
- High school: Rubidoux (Jurupa Valley, California)
- College: Colorado
- NFL draft: 1987: 8th round, 215th overall pick

Career history

Playing
- Cincinnati Bengals (1987–1990); Minnesota Vikings (1991); Pittsburgh Steelers (1992)

Coaching
- YCF Grit (2019) Head coach

Awards and highlights
- Cincinnati Bengals 40th Anniversary Team

Career NFL statistics
- Sacks: 1
- Fumble recoveries: 3
- Interceptions: 2
- Stats at Pro Football Reference

Solomon Wilcots (born October 9, 1964) is an American former professional football player who is a national television analyst and broadcaster as well as a head coach in Your Call Football. Wilcots played six seasons as a free safety in the National Football League (NFL) for the Cincinnati Bengals, Minnesota Vikings and Pittsburgh Steelers. He played college football for the Colorado Buffaloes.

== Playing career ==
Wilcots attended Rubidoux High School in Riverside, California.

He played college football at the University of Colorado under coach Bill McCartney. He was a medical redshirt as a freshman when the Buffaloes went 1–10, but the program enjoyed a turnaround during Wilcots' time there as a defensive back with records of 7–5, 6–6, 7–4, 8–4, and three bowl appearances. He earned a degree in English literature.

Pre-draft measurables
| Height | Weight | Arm length | Hand span | 40-yard dash | 10-yard split | 20-yard split | 20-yard shuttle | Vertical jump | Broad jump | Bench press |
|---|---|---|---|---|---|---|---|---|---|---|
| 5 ft 10 1/4 in (1.78 m) | 186 lb (84 kg) | 30 3/4 in (0.78 m) | 8 1/2 in (0.22 m) | 4.60 s | 1.64 s | 2.63 s | 4.40 s | 31.5 in (0.80 m) | 9 ft 10 in (3.00 m) | 11 reps |
All values from NFL Combine

In the 1987 NFL draft, he was chosen in the eighth round (215th overall) by the Cincinnati Bengals.

During his rookie season of 1987, he played in 12 games for the Bengals and recorded the first of his two career interceptions. In 1988, he was a starter in all 16 games, and in 1989 he played in all 16 games as a reserve defensive back. In 1990, he again played in all 16 games, including 10 as a starter. In 1991, he signed with the Minnesota Vikings, playing in all 16 games, and in 1992, his final season, he played in 16 games for the Pittsburgh Steelers.

== Broadcasting career ==
Wilcots began his television career as a weekend sports anchor for NBC Cincinnati affiliate WLWT from 1994 until 2003. During this time he spent three seasons (1998–2000) as a sideline reporter for ESPN's Sunday Night Football, for which he received an Emmy Award in 2000 for sideline reporting.

In 2001, Wilcots joined CBS, where he was a color commentator for CBS football telecasts, first paired with Ian Eagle from 2001 to 2008, followed by Kevin Harlan from 2009 to 2013, and Spero Dedes from 2014 to 2016. He is also an analyst on the NFL Network's NFL Total Access show. On NFL Network, Wilcots can be seen each week on "Playbook", utilizing the same "all 22" game film that coaches and players use to preview all of the upcoming games, alongside an array of former NFL players including Brian Baldinger, Sterling Sharpe and Mike Mayock. Wilcots also is the co-host of "The Opening Drive" on Sirius NFL Radio with Marty Schottenheimer, Gil Brandt and Carl Banks. Wilcots announced his departure from CBS in May 2017.

For several years, Wilcots served as a television announcer for New Orleans Saints preseason games alongside Tim Brando.

Wilcots is now an analyst for Sky Sports in the UK and a guest analyst for Pro Football Focus TV.

He was also a Sideline Reporter in the 2012-13 NFL Playoffs where he joined Steve Tasker

== Appearances in other media ==
Wilcots appears as a playable player in All-Pro Football 2K8.
