= Agent 13: The Invisible Empire =

1986 book by Flint Dille

The Invisible Empire
- The Invisible Empire cover
- Author: Flint Dille, David Marconi
- Cover artist: Jeff Butler
- Language: English
- Series: Agent 13: The Midnight Avenger
- Genre: Juvenile
- Publisher: TSR, Inc.
- Publication date: 1986
- Publication place: United States
- Media type: Print (Paperback)
- Pages: 192
- ISBN: 0-88038-281-3
- OCLC: 13656936
- Preceded by: None
- Followed by: Agent 13: The Serpentine Assassin

The Invisible Empire is the first of the short series of fast-paced, action-based adventure of Agent 13: The Midnight Avenger, written by Flint Dille and David Marconi in a style reminiscent of popular 1930s pulps.

The eponymous title referred to the secret network of operatives working for a sinister organization bent on world domination. After countless years of clandestine activity, the organization exerted inestimable influence in the world, penetrating numerous major governments and powerful institutions.

== Plot summary ==
=== The Opening ===
Set in the late 1930s, just before the outbreak of World War II which ominous events around the world was portending, the book opened with a mysterious nocturnal trip made by a Nazi SS Colonel Schmidt to a clandestine meeting in a secret chamber beneath the Hagia Sophia in Istanbul.

The chamber predated the existence of the church, and known only to the organization known as the Brotherhood, of which the colonel was a member of, sent as an agent to Germany in late 1918 to closely monitor the factions struggling for control of the humiliated, wrecked nation defeated in World War I.

The Brotherhood was seeking to gain control over the whole world, and it was Colonel Schmidt who found a candidate with great potential in an anti-Semitic demagogue in Bavaria to be the puppet leader of Germany, an unwitting but definite pawn of the Brotherhood. Schmidt had carefully groomed the man, bankrolled the endeavor to take over from the troubled Weimar Republic, having first changed the man's name from awful Schicklgruber into Hitler.

Having succeeded in securing his pawn as undisputed leader of Germany, and even arranging the disposal of Engelbert Dollfuss of Austria to pave the way for the Anschluss, Schmidt was in Istanbul to make a report to his superiors. He only made it as far as the concealed entrance of the secret chamber, killed right after he triggered the mechanism to disclose the hidden portal.

His killer left a calling card on Schmidt's corpse, the number 13 burnt on the forehead of the dead man, and attended the meeting disguised as Schmidt. At the meeting, a senior Brotherhood member was inspecting all attendees, using a special crystal to reveal a number imprinted on the palms of all Brotherhood agents. The palm of Schmidt's killer was inspected and the number 13 was called out in the familiar routine.

It was a moment before the significance struck and a gasp of sharp fear seized all who heard it. That moment was all it took for the killer to strike and slaughter all the others, before escaping with his goal accomplished, along with documents Schmidt was carrying, and the bonus of the special crystal, with which he could use to unerringly identify all members of the Brotherhood.

=== Agent 13 ===
The killer, known only as Agent 13 in the series, was once the best assassin raised from childhood and trained by the Brotherhood. The Brotherhood itself claimed to its members to be a hidden guiding hand in world affairs through the centuries, always keeping its presence secret in the background, while manipulating events around the globe through its agents, to direct the development of human culture. Its existence preceded the written history of mankind, founded by survivors of the Lemurian nation which was destroyed in antiquity long before the rise of ancient human civilizations.

During his training, Agent 13 had perceived that the Brotherhood true nature not to be benevolent but evil, and fled. For years, he was hunted by Brotherhood agents, and in time, he turned around fought back, dedicating himself to cause as much damage possible in his mostly single vanguard crusade against an organization of unimaginable power, resources and reach into the world's governments. One of his main aim was to relocate the Brotherhood's main base. The close pursuit during his desperate flight from the Brotherhood's secret headquarters to the outside world prevented him from retracing his route later.

=== The Trap ===
After the debacle of Istanbul, the virtually immortal leader and founder of the Brotherhood, known as Itsu, the Hand Sinister, laid a cunning elaborate trap for Agent 13, knowing his agents were vulnerable with the special crystal (Seer Stone) in Agent 13's possession, the renegade who would stop at nothing to thwart the Brotherhood.

From Schmidt's documents, Agent 13 learned of the Brotherhood's interest in an experimental Lightning Gun developed by American scientist Dr. David Fischer. At a successful demonstration of the gun's principles, conducted by the US military, and attended by senior officials, Agent 13 overheard the National Security Advisor (NSA) Kent Walters hurrying to call a National Security Council (NSC) in response to a blackmail threat just received.

Infiltrating the meeting, which was attended by the NSC composed of John Myerson (Assistant Attorney General), Jack Halloran (Treasury), Kent Walters (NSA), Constantin Gyrakos (head, Secret Service, East Coast division), and Robert Buckhurst (Deputy Director, FBI), it was revealed through a projection of a film that an enemy, known as the Masque, using the omega as his symbol, easily capable of untraceable large-scale destruction was demanding the USA to drastically scale down its armament process. The blackmailer claimed responsibility for three disasters shown in the film:

1. Montana Rail Crash as the train Olympian was plying on a 180-feet high bridge.
2. Complete destruction of Westron Aircraft base for aircraft development and experiments.
3. Airship Hindenburg disaster.

The deliberate filmings indicated prior knowledge of the disasters, and probably, responsibility by the blackmailers. The filmings also strongly hinted at the blackmailers having unknown advance technology, and capable of massive destruction.

The council was undecided about the response to the threat when Agent 13 revealed himself. News, with more rumors than truth, of his exploits over the years had filtered to the intelligence community, causing the council to be just as undecided whether he was an ally or a foe.

Before the decision was reached, elite assassins from the Brotherhood launched an ambush, killing almost everyone in the room. Only Agent 13 and Kent Walters narrowly escaped death, Kent Walters badly shot and barely alive.

=== Counter-strike ===
From clues collected from the bodies of one of the ambushers, Agent 13 deduced the local footpad was to collect his pay-off at an opera in New York City, performed by the world-famous diva named China White. Agent 13 attended the opera disguised as the footpad, with his loyal assistant, Maggie Darr. Maggie noted that the mention of China White invoked a never seen before in Agent 13's otherwise perpetually emotionless expression.

Using the Seer Stone as bait, Agent 13 and Maggie Darr were invited to China White's local lair, a speakeasy called the Brown Rat, located beneath the city. They barely escaped with their lives from watery death trap there, but found another clue to follow the Brotherhood's plot to the sailing of the luxury liner SS Normandie.

When they discovered Dr. David Fischer was on board with his Lightning Gun, and China White was also along as a star performer, they realized what the Brotherhood wanted, but still did not know how it was to be carried out. Trying to avoid the easy way out to kill Fischer, Agent 13 and Maggie boarded the liner in disguise, separately keeping an eye on Fischer and on White.

Too late, Agent 13 and Maggie discovered the Brotherhood intended to sink the ship, while kidnapping the scientist. Fighting valiantly, they managed to save the ship, but the Brotherhood agents escaped with the experimental weapon.

Worst of all, Agent 13 was lost to the icy waters of the Atlantic Ocean, where he would have his watery grave after all, leaving Maggie Darr alone in the impossible fight against the Brotherhood.

== Characters ==
- Colonel Schmidt, an SS officer and Brotherhood's primary agent in Nazi Germany.
- Agent 13, a former member of the Brotherhood, skilled in combat, undercover operations, and master of disguise.
- Maggie Darr, hailing from a respectable and relatively well-off Chicago family, her unfortunate choice of boyfriend led her to being kidnapped and held against her will by gangsters. Escaping after a humiliating ordeal, she trained herself to shoot to take vengeance on her tormentors. By serendipity, a disguised Agent 13 saved her after she finished off her last target and was about to be killed by her victim's henchmen. She became one of his closest operator.
- Kent Walters, National Security Advisor.
- LaMonica, Washington DC police detective. He was pursuing suspects after the NSC ambush, nearly arrested Agent 13, but in the end, was saved from the assassins by Agent 13.
- Michael Carson, a lowly hoodlum engaged as pointer by the Brotherhood assassins in the NSC ambush.
- Ray Furnow, an assistant of Agent 13 of Asian origins. He had apparently disappeared many times before, seemingly killed, but always mysteriously returned, claiming to use some trick he learned to keep his so-called numerous wives and children at bay, but also using them as endless supply of help to Agent 13. Ray experimented and provided many gadgets and special equipment to Agent 13.
- China White, agent of the Brotherhood whose cover was a world-class opera diva.
- Dr. David Fischer, inventor of the experimental Lightning Gun. Through machinations of the Brotherhood, the US military rejected his invention and refused funding to develop it into a viable weapon. This was intended to make him open to "alternative offers".
- Jack Spade, a hoodlum employed by the Brotherhood in New York city.
- Renard, Night Watch officer on the SS Normandie.

== Chapter headings ==
1. Intrigue in Istanbul
2. The Invisible Empire
3. Lightning Strikes
4. The Cryptic Tryst
5. Death's Calling Card
6. Voice from the Shadows
7. After the Assassins
8. Who Stalks the Night?
9. Trail of Torment
10. Sanctuary
11. Ashes to Ashes
12. Tickets to Doom
13. The Siren's Scream
14. Below the Brown Rat
15. Dark Greetings
16. Jaws of Horror
17. Dance in the Deluge
18. Death Waits Alone
19. Vessel of Light
20. Grim Assignments
21. Gathering Gloom
22. Waltz of the Spider
23. Fish in the Net
24. Lights Out for the Ladies' Man
25. Wheels of Fury
26. Iron Fish of Death
27. Dead in the Water
