= Camelback Ranch =

Baseball stadium in Phoenix, Arizona, US

Camelback Ranch-Glendale

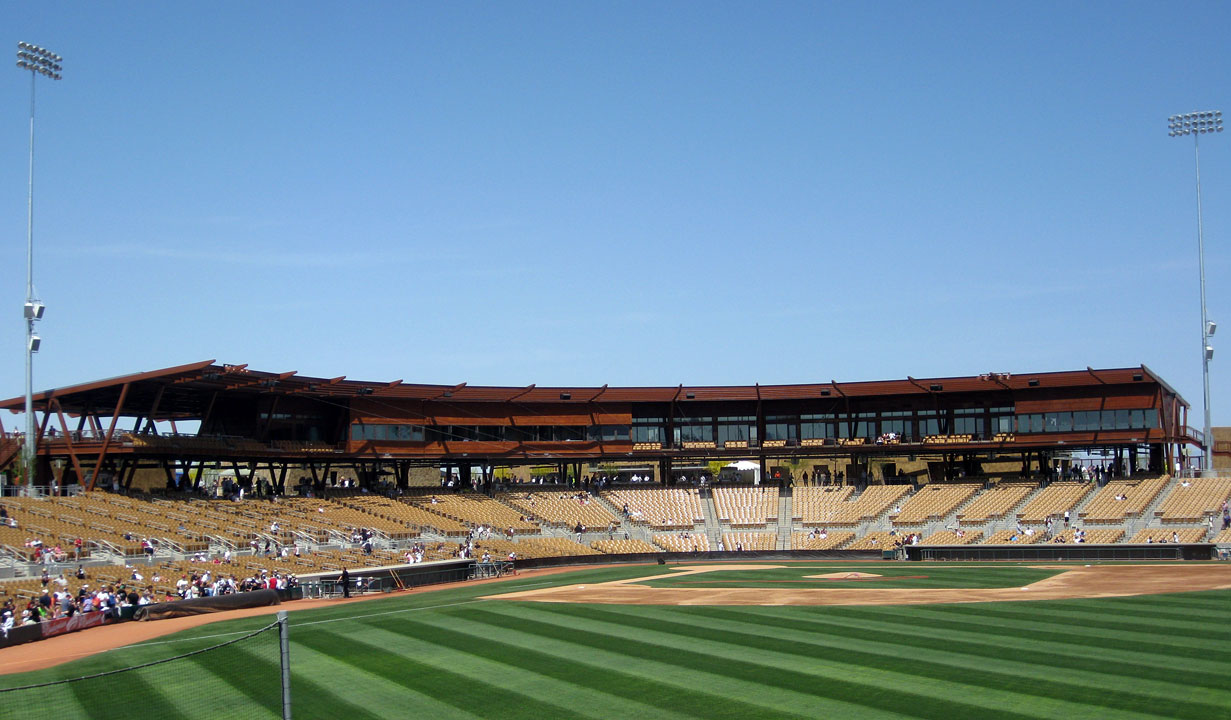
- View from right field
- Interactive map of Camelback Ranch-Glendale
- Location: 10712 W. Camelback Road; Phoenix, Arizona 85037
- Coordinates: 33°30′51″N 112°17′45″W
- Capacity: 13,000: 10,000 seats, 3,000 berm (grass) seats.
- Surface: grass
- Record attendance: 13,583; March 27, 2010; Seattle Mariners vs. Los Angeles Dodgers
- Field size: Left Field – 345 feet (105 m); Left-Center – 380 feet (116 m); Center Field – 410 feet (125 m); Right-Center – 380 feet (116 m); Right Field – 345 feet (105 m)

Construction
- Built: 2008–2009
- Opened: March 1, 2009
- Cost: US$121 million
- Architect: HKS, Inc.
- Builder: Mortenson
- Structural engineer: HKS, Inc.

Tenants
- Los Angeles Dodgers (MLB) (spring training) (2009–present); Chicago White Sox (MLB) (spring training) (2009–present); Arizona Complex League Dodgers (ACL) (2009–present); Glendale Desert Dogs (AFL) (2013–present); Arizona Complex League White Sox (ACL) (2014–present)

Camelback Ranch–Glendale is a baseball complex located in Phoenix, Arizona, and owned by the city of Glendale. It is operated by Camelback Spring Training LLC. It is the spring training home of the Los Angeles Dodgers and Chicago White Sox. The main stadium holds 13,000 people.

Camelback Ranch replaced Holman Stadium in Vero Beach, Florida, as the Dodgers' spring training home, and Tucson Electric Park in Tucson, Arizona, as the White Sox spring training home.

The park is also home to the Arizona Complex League Dodgers, who moved to Camelback Ranch with the Major League team in 2009. The Arizona Complex League White Sox play there as of 2014, after the White Sox rejoined the Arizona rookie circuit.

The stadium name is derived from the longstanding name of the property it is built on.

Roger Bossard, White Sox head groundskeeper, designed and put in all of the fields for the Dodgers and the White Sox. During the park's first year, Dodger fans noted and expressed their dismay at the absence of the Dodger Dog at the ballpark concession stands. The following season, Dodger Dogs began to be sold at the ballpark.

== History ==
Camelback Ranch opened on March 1, 2009, for the spring training home opener between the Los Angeles Dodgers and the Chicago White Sox. The Dodgers took a 2–0 lead into the top of the ninth until the White Sox came back to defeat them 3–2. (Attendance: 11,280)

In 2015, the Dodgers drew 147,066 fans to their 15 spring training games at Camelback Ranch (an average of just over 9,804 per game), setting a new franchise spring training record.

Prior to the 2018 Spring Training season, two separate roof panels were installed on the 1st base side to cover fans from the sun.

== Ranch novelties ==
- 10,000-plus seats, 3,000 bermed grass seating. There are 8 full suites, 4 mini-suites, a press box, a suite-level party deck, and a series of outfield terraces that create party areas.
- A fish-stocked lake that separates the Dodgers and White Sox training facilities and offers aesthetic beauty and irrigation to complex landscaping and playing fields.
- Over 5,000 plants and trees.
- Stadium playing field sunken 12 feet below grade to improve sightlines.
- A mixture of architectural touches—natural stone veneers, tri-color faux staining, rusty metal panels,
- Gabion (rock) retaining walls, earth-tone (caramel) stadium seat color, and other appointments—that blend with the natural desert colors of Arizona. Additionally, construction utilizes sweeps and angles instead of a big-box look.
- Main entrance (Pavilion) in center field.
- Asymmetrical team support buildings.
- Orange grove.
- Replica home fields (Dodger Stadium, Rate Field)
- 12 practice diamonds and three practice infields
- Access tunnels for players to enter the stadium from their clubhouses.
- Bandstand for pre-game entertainment
- Walk of Fame along the water feature.

== Gallery ==
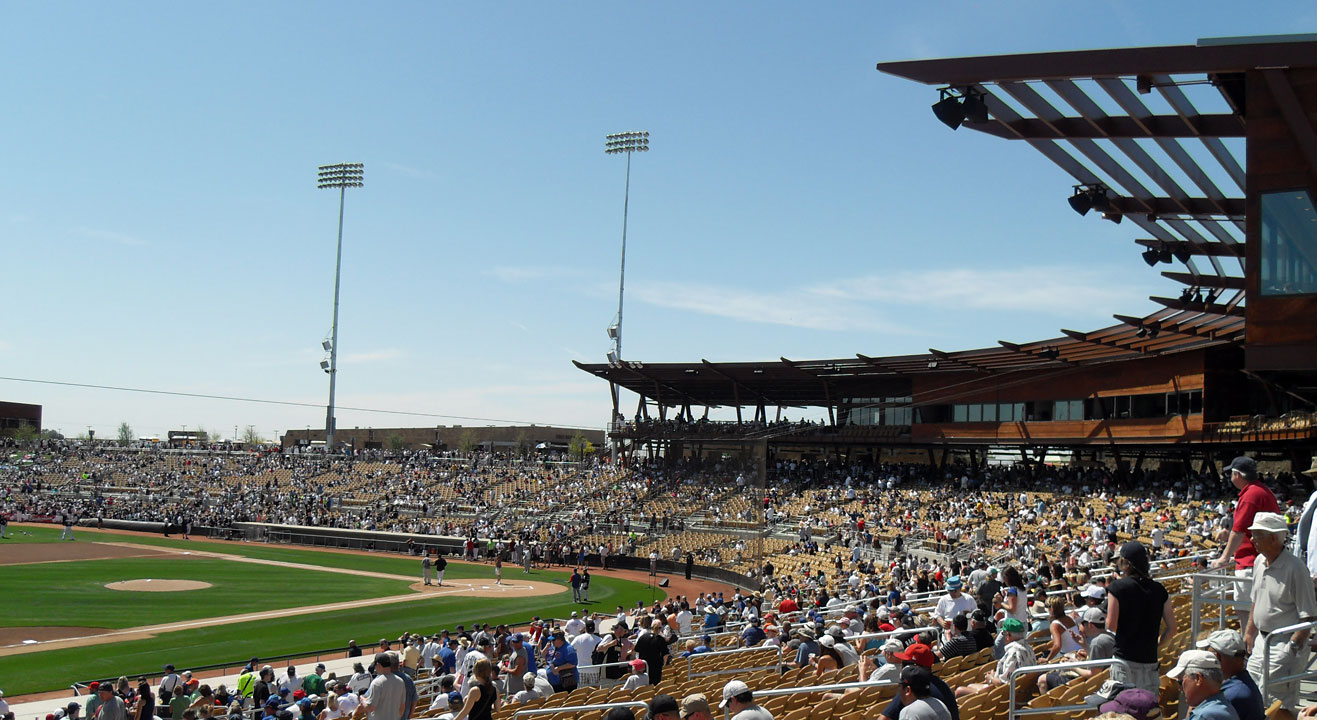
Press boxes and suites

The fish stocked lake that separates the White Sox and Dodgers training fields

== Notes ==
Preceded by Tucson Electric Park	Home of the Chicago White Sox Spring Training; 2009–present	Succeeded by Current
Preceded by Holman Stadium	Home of the Los Angeles Dodgers Spring Training; 2009–present	Succeeded by Current
