= Agency Township =

Agency Township may refer to:

- Agency Township, Wapello County, Iowa
- Agency Township, Osage County, Kansas
- Agency Township, Buchanan County, Missouri
- Agency Township, Roberts County, South Dakota
