= Agency Township, Buchanan County, Missouri =

Township in Buchanan County, Missouri, U.S.

Agency Township
- Township
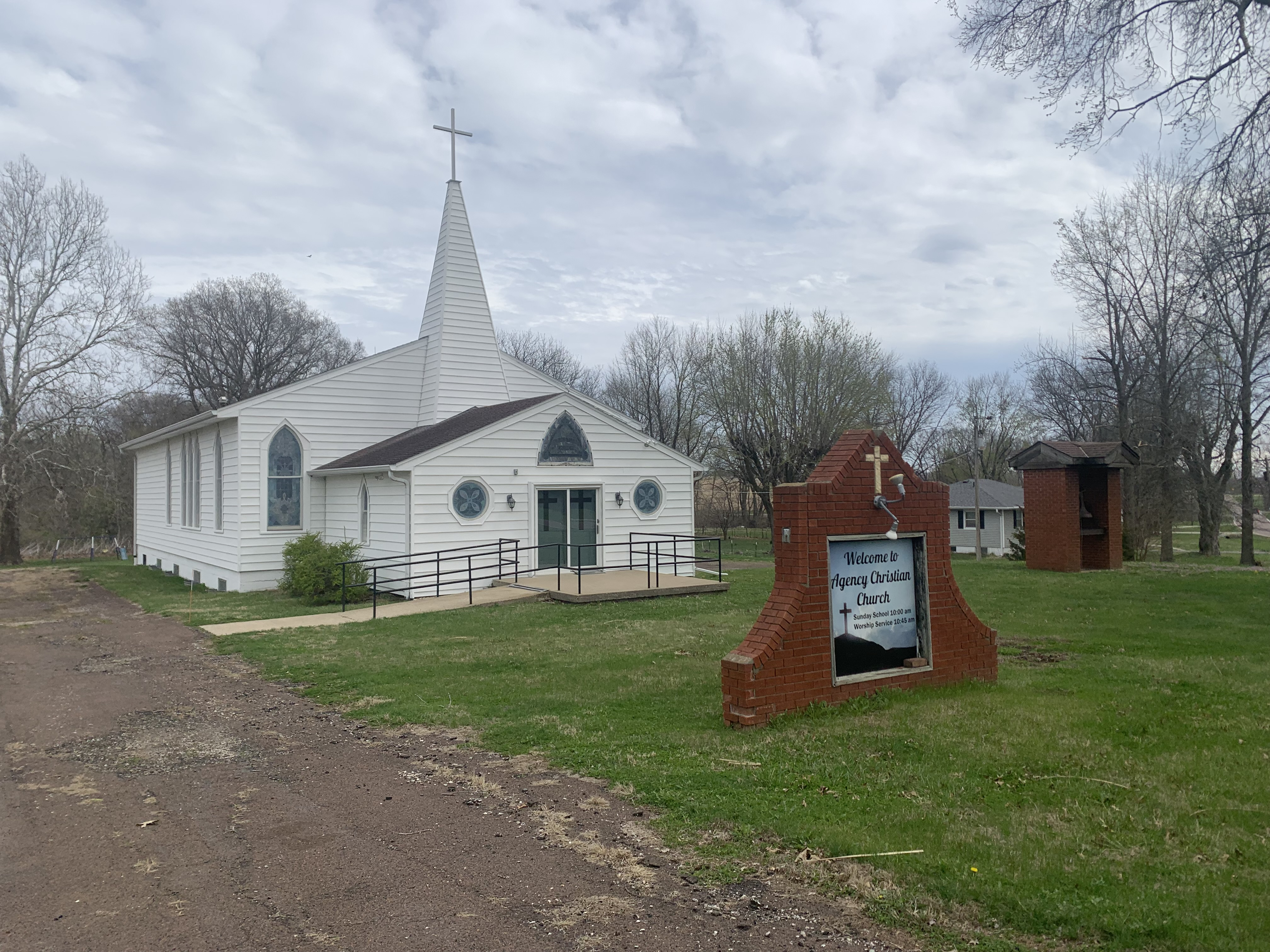
- Agency Christian Church in the village of Agency

- Coordinates: 39°40′45″N 94°44′17″W
- Country: United States
- State: Missouri
- County: Buchanan

Area
  - Total: 16.18 sq mi (41.91 km^{2})
  - Land: 16.02 sq mi (41.49 km^{2})
  - Water: 0.16 sq mi (0.42 km^{2}) 1%
- Elevation: 935 ft (285 m)

Population (2020)
  - Total: 1,268
  - Density: 74.4/sq mi (28.7/km^{2})
- FIPS code: 29-00316
- GNIS feature ID: 0766336

Agency Township is one of twelve townships in Buchanan County, Missouri, USA. As of the 2020 census, its population was 1,268.

The first settlement in Agency Township was established in 1837.

== Geography ==
Agency Township covers an area of 16.18 square miles (41.9 km^{2}) and contains one incorporated settlement, Agency. It has two cemeteries: Karns and Pine.

Millers Lake is located within the township, and the streams of Pigeon Creek and Rock Creek run through it.

== Transportation ==
The following highways travel through the township:

- U.S. Route 169
- Route FF
- Route H
- Route MM
- Route O
