= Fury/Agent 13 =

- Cover for issue 2 with art by Bob Smith and Michael J. Zeck

Publication information
- Publisher: Marvel Comics
- Format: Ongoing series
- No. of issues: 2
- Main character(s): Nick Fury, Sharon Carter

Creative team
- Written by: Terry Kavanagh
- Penciller: Ramón José Bernado
- Inker: Ian Akin
- Letterer(s): Emerson Miranda; Richard Alan Starkings
- Colorist: Kevin M. Tinsley
- Editor(s): Bob Harras; Matt Idelson

Fury/Agent 13 is a comic book miniseries published by Marvel Comics in 1998.

== Publication history ==
The series is a follow-up to a storyline in Captain America Vol. 3. With only two issues to its run, it is exceptionally short even for a limited series, and has been referred to as a "microseries".

== Plot ==
Sharon Carter believes that Nick Fury's death at the hands of the Punisher must have been staged.

She breaks into a top-secret S.H.I.E.L.D. facility looking for proof and finds that Fury's bullet-ridden "body" is actually an LMD. Carter takes the head of the LMD to Tony Stark. He admits to having helped build it for Fury, and uses the circuitry within to gather a clue: "Fallen Angel." The clue leads Carter to explore Fury's private office in a sunken S.H.I.E.L.D. Helicarrier. However, S.H.I.E.L.D. has arranged for security to protect the tech in the sunken Helicarrier, and they comes after her. She escapes and uses the data gained to find an energy portal hidden under the site of the original S.H.I.E.L.D. building. She jumps through the portal, which turns out to be a time portal.

Carter runs into Fury in the middle of WWII, and after holding him at gunpoint, reluctantly helps him fight off Nazis and link up with the other Howling Commandos. Fury explains that they're not actually in the past, but in a pocket-dimension shaped by the willpower of those within it. He says he had received coded messages from Fallen Angel, the supposedly-dead original S.H.I.E.L.D. director. When he reached the location, Fallen Angel pushed him through the portal and then committed suicide. Fury tells Carter that they have to find another portal in this pocket-dimension in order to get back to reality. As the two work together to make it home, Fury explains to Carter that the reason he left her out in the cold was that he assumed she really was dead. After that they reach a portal back to reality.

== Prints ==
No.	Title	Cover date	Comic Book Roundup rating	Estimated sales (first month)	Estimated sales (second month)
#1	"Search..."	June 1998	N/A	24,550, ranked 97th in North American	23,451, ranked 85th in North American
#2	"...and Destroy!"	July 1998	N/A	20,869, ranked 113th in North American	

== See also ==
- 1998 in comics
