= Political agent =

Political Agent or political agent may refer to:

- Political Resident, a representative with consular duties and political contacts with local chiefs
- Political officer (British Empire), an officer of the British imperial civil administration, also called Political Agent
- Election agent, a person legally responsible for the conduct of a candidate's political campaign
