= Secret Agent =

A secret agent is a covert agent engaged in espionage.

Secret Agent, The Secret Agent or Secret Agents may also refer to:

== Books ==
- The Secret Agent, a 1907 novel by Joseph Conrad

== Films and television ==
=== Based on the Conrad novel ===
- The Secret Agent (1975 TV play)
- The Secret Agent (1992 TV series), with Peter Capaldi and David Suchet
- The Secret Agent (1996 film), with Bob Hoskins
- The Secret Agent (2016 TV series), with Toby Jones

=== Unrelated to Conrad novel ===
- The Secret Agent (1924 film), a German silent film
- Secret Agent (1932 film), a German thriller film
- Secret Agent (1936 film), directed by Alfred Hitchcock based on stories by W. Somerset Maugham
  - Hitchcock filmed Conrad's The Secret Agent as Sabotage
- Secret Agent (1943 film), the last of Paramount's "Superman" cartoon shorts
- Secret Agent (1947 film), a Soviet film by Boris Barnet
- Danger Man, a 1960s British TV series titled Secret Agent for U.S. broadcasts
- The Secret Agent (documentary), a 2004 BBC documentary about the British National Party
- The Age of Shadows, a 2016 Korean film known during production as Secret Agent
- The Secret Agent (2025 film), a historical political thriller film set around the final years of the Brazilian military dictatorship

== Music ==
- Secret Agent (Chick Corea album), 1978
- Secret Agent (Robin Gibb album), 1984
- Secret Agent (Judie Tzuke album), 1998
- "The Secret Agent", a song from the album Electric Tepee by Hawkwind, 1992
- Secret Agent, a radio channel on SomaFM
- Secret Agent, a Psy Spy Instro Surf band from Mexico City

== Videogames ==
- Secret Agent (video game), a 1992 computer game by Apogee Software, rereleased 2013
- Sly Spy, a 1989 arcade game, known in Japan as Secret Agent in Europe as Sly Spy: Secret Agent

== See also ==
- Secret Agent Man (disambiguation)
- Special Agent, in the United States Secret Service
