= Agency, Missouri =

- Village
- Village of Agency
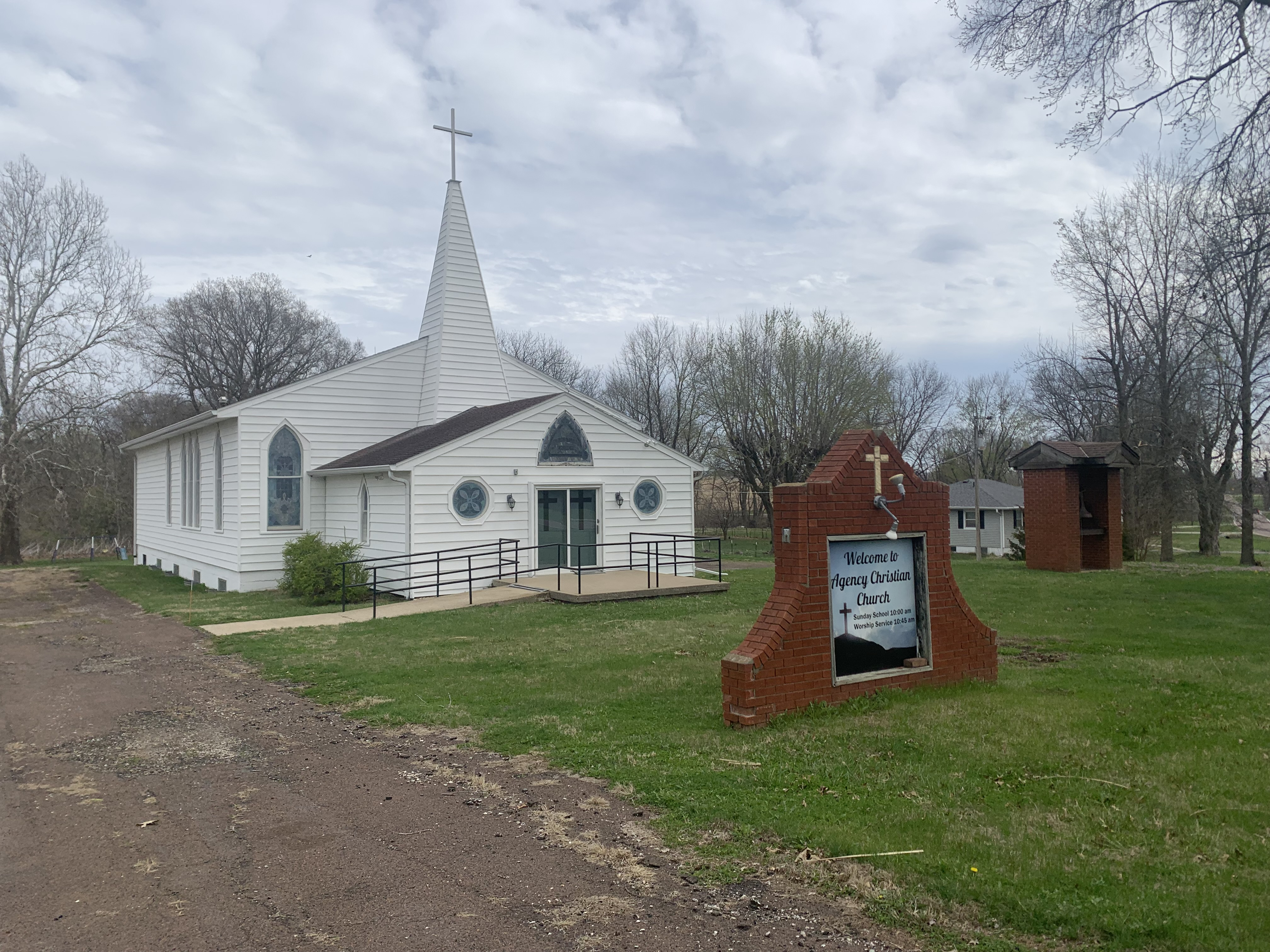
- Agency Christian Church

- Location of Agency, Missouri

- Location within Missouri Location within the United States
- Coordinates: 39°39′34″N 94°44′51″W
- Country: United States
- State: Missouri
- County: Buchanan
- Township: Agency
- Incorporated: 1903

Area
  - Total: 3.73 sq mi (9.67 km^{2})
  - Land: 3.68 sq mi (9.54 km^{2})
  - Water: 0.050 sq mi (0.13 km^{2})
- Elevation: 896 ft (273 m)

Population (2020)
  - Total: 671
  - Density: 182.1/sq mi (70.31/km^{2})
- Time zone: UTC-6 (Central (CST))
  - Summer (DST): UTC-5 (CDT)
- ZIP code: 64401
- Area code: 816
- FIPS code: 29-00298
- GNIS feature ID: 2397917
- Website: www.villageofagency.org

Agency is a village in Buchanan County, Missouri, United States. The population was 671 at the 2020 census. It is part of the St. Joseph, MO–KS Metropolitan Statistical Area.

== History ==
Before Agency was a permanent settlement it was a ford of the Platte River. Agency was laid out in 1865. It was formerly the site of an agency of the Sac and Fox Indians, hence the name. A post office called Agency has been in operation since 1872. On Sunday, May 20, 1923, a Ku Klux Klan picnic held at Agency was attended by several thousand people. Speakers included Rev. Bloom, Rev. Smallwood, and Rev. Rendlemarr, all of Partee Park Baptist Church.

== Geography ==
According to the United States Census Bureau, the village has a total area of 4.30 square miles (11.14 km^{2}), of which 4.25 square miles (11.01 km^{2}) is land and 0.05 square miles (0.13 km^{2}) is water.

== Demographics ==
Historical population
Census	Pop.	Note	%±
1880	265		—
1890	303		14.3%
1900	380		25.4%
1910	429		12.9%
1920	403		−6.1%
1930	349		−13.4%
1940	361		3.4%
1950	234		−35.2%
1960	240		2.6%
1970	141		−41.2%
1980	419		197.2%
1990	642		53.2%
2000	599		−6.7%
2010	684		14.2%
2020	671		−1.9%
U.S. Decennial Census

=== 2010 census ===
As of the census of 2010, there were 684 people, 257 households, and 210 families living in the village. The population density was 160.9 inhabitants per square mile (62.1/km^{2}). There were 268 housing units at an average density of 63.1 per square mile (24.4/km^{2}). The racial makeup of the village was 96.6% White, 0.3% African American, 0.9% Asian, 1.2% from other races, and 1.0% from two or more races. Hispanic or Latino of any race were 2.9% of the population.

There were 257 households, of which 38.1% had children under the age of 18 living with them, 68.5% were married couples living together, 8.2% had a female householder with no husband present, 5.1% had a male householder with no wife present, and 18.3% were non-families. 12.5% of all households were made up of individuals, and 5.1% had someone living alone who was 65 years of age or older. The average household size was 2.66 and the average family size was 2.92.

The median age in the village was 37.5 years. 24.9% of residents were under the age of 18; 8.6% were between the ages of 18 and 24; 26.4% were from 25 to 44; 29.5% were from 45 to 64; and 10.5% were 65 years of age or older. The gender makeup of the village was 50.3% male and 49.7% female.

=== 2000 census ===
As of the census of 2000, there were 599 people, 214 households, and 176 families living in the village. The population density was 309.3 inhabitants per square mile (119.4/km^{2}). There were 222 housing units at an average density of 114.6 per square mile (44.2/km^{2}). The racial makeup of the village was 98.50% White, 0.50% Asian, 0.50% from other races, and 0.50% from two or more races. Hispanic or Latino of any race were 1.67% of the population.

There were 214 households, out of which 44.4% had children under the age of 18 living with them, 69.6% were married couples living together, 9.3% had a female householder with no husband present, and 17.3% were non-families. 12.6% of all households were made up of individuals, and 2.8% had someone living alone who was 65 years of age or older. The average household size was 2.80 and the average family size was 3.04.

In the village, the population was spread out, with 30.1% under the age of 18, 6.5% from 18 to 24, 33.7% from 25 to 44, 24.5% from 45 to 64, and 5.2% who were 65 years of age or older. The median age was 35 years. For every 100 females, there were 104.4 males. For every 100 females age 18 and over, there were 96.7 males.

The median income for a household in the village was $49,375, and the median income for a family was $52,500. Males had a median income of $37,969 versus $24,018 for females. The per capita income for the village was $20,304. About 3.7% of families and 6.1% of the population were below the poverty line, including 7.1% of those under age 18 and 9.1% of those age 65 or over.

== Education ==
The school district is Mid-Buchanan County R-V School District.
