= The Agency (2007 TV series) =

- Genre: Reality
- Composer: Leigh Roberts
- Country of origin: United States
- Original language: English
- No. of seasons: 1
- No. of episodes: 7

Production
- Executive producers: Gary Benz; Ken Druckerman; Danielle Gelfand; Michael Hirschorn; Sean Patterson; Corey Preston; Banks Tarver; Shelly Tatro
- Producers: Anneli Gericke; Elizabeth Grizzle
- Production location: New York City
- Cinematography: Paul Dokuchitz
- Editors: Joe Beshenkovsky; Anthony Carbone; Jordan Montminy
- Running time: 30 mins.

Original release
- Network: VH1
- Release: February 20 – April 3, 2007

The Agency is an American reality series that aired on VH1 in 2007.

== Overview ==
The series followed modeling agents that worked for the men and women's high-end division of the Wilhelmina Modeling Agency.

== Participants ==
- Sean Patterson – President
- Greg – Men's Board Agent
- Anita – Men's Board Agent
- Lorri – Men's Board Agent
- Pink – Head of High-End Women's Board
- Becky – High-End Women's Board Agent
- Carlos – High-End Women's Board Agent
- Lola – High-End Women's Board Assistant
- Paul Wharton – Model Coach

== Episodes ==
Episode	Title	Original airdate
1	"Fashin Week"	February 20, 2007
2	"Model Contest"	February 27, 2007
3	"Scouting the South"	March 6, 2007
4	"New Model"	March 13, 2007
5	"Saving a Model"	March 20, 2007
6	"New Faces"	March 27, 2007
7	"Supermodel Promo Book"	April 3, 2007
