= Agent 13: The Midnight Avenger =

1980s novel series

- Cover of The Invisible Empire
- Author: Flint Dille and David Marconi
- Publisher: TSR, Inc.
- Published: 1986 to 1988

Agent 13: The Midnight Avenger was the name of a novel series based on Top Secret/S.I. setting published by TSR, Inc. from 1986 to 1988. There were three stories in the series, following the actions of the protagonist referred to in the novels only as Agent 13, or simply, The Agent. It was written by Flint Dille and David Marconi.

There is also a source book based on the characters and settings in the series.(Agent 13 Novels)

The background of the series was set in the late 1930s, reminiscent of the popular pulps of the era. Graphic novel editions of the series were also published subsequently.

== The Series ==
=== Novels ===
1. The Invisible Empire, ISBN 978-0-88038-281-6
2. The Serpentine Assassin, ISBN 978-0-88038-282-3
3. Acolytes of Darkness, ISBN 978-0-88038-550-3 (published as part of Double Agent book series).

=== Graphic novels ===
1. Agent 13: The Midnight Avenger, by Flint Dille, David Marconi, and Dan Spiegle, ISBN 978-0-88038-581-7 (based on The Invisible Empire and The Serpentine Assassin).
2. Agent 13: Acolytes of Darkness, ISBN 978-0-88038-800-9

=== Other publications ===
1. TSAC2: Agent 13 Sourcebook (1988) by Ray Winninger, ISBN 978-0-88038-478-0
2. Agent 13 Assassin: The Immortal Avenger/Role Playing Game Comic (Agent 13 Game Comic), by Mike Barr, Robb Phipps and Alfredo Alcala, published October 1990 by TSR. ISBN 978-0-88038-944-0

== Setting ==
The primary antagonists of the series was a group known as The Brotherhood. They were a highly secretive organization formed by remnants of the legendary lost civilization of Lemuria. Lemuria had been an advanced civilization in the prehistoric age of mankind.

Lemuria was destroyed by ravaging horde of primitive barbarians. The survivors who escaped established a hidden base whereby they dedicated themselves to preserving their advanced knowledge, keeping their existence a secret from the world, but maintaining a network of agents working surreptitiously amongst the rulers.

Through actions of these agents, the Brotherhood kept an eye on the development of the world, intervening through indirect and subtle means to guide the course of history, and when they judged the time was ready, gradually release bits of knowledge, such as specific scientific breakthroughs, to the world.

In the story, the secret agents of the Brotherhood were responsible for preventing the sacking of Rome by Attila the Hun in AD 452, as well as being responsible for the advancements during the Renaissance.

It was not revealed, at first, when corruption set in, or whether it had been there from the beginning. Eventually, Itsu, known as the Hand Sinister, one of the paramount leaders of the Brotherhood, seized full control of the Brotherhood, and began using it as a tool to dominate the world. Its agents acted to infiltrate the major governments of the world and set the world on a path towards globally destructive war, which would give them the opportunity to become its master.

== Agent 13 ==
Kidnapped as a young child in 1907, a gifted boy was brought to the secret headquarters of the Brotherhood known as The Shrine. His past memories were erased, he was assigned as Agent 13 and trained as an assassin and an agent in clandestine operations.

He became the best disciple and would have risen high in the ranks of the Brotherhood, until he discovered its true nature. Fleeing, he was hunted by agents sent by the Brotherhood and began a deadly cat-and-mouse contest against the organization.

Eventually, he survived their attacks long enough to fight back, having formed his own group of allies to provide him with support. At the beginning of the story, Agent 13 dedicated himself to fighting against the plans of the Brotherhood.

== Film ==
On April 21, 2012, it was reported that Universal Pictures had the rights for a film version that was to star Charlize Theron. Rupert Wyatt would direct and T. S. Nowlin would write the screenplay.

== List of allies ==
- Benny the Eye: Deployed for assignments to tail targets.
- China White: One of the Brotherhood's top members trained to seduce. Agent 13's lover.
- Maggie Darr: The beautiful operative closest to Agent 13.
- Ray Furnow: An Asian who seemed to have endless number of wives and children to deploy as human resources for Agent 13.
