= David Marconi =

American film director

- Occupation: Film director

David Marconi is an American screenwriter, film producer and film director. His writing credits include the screenplays for Enemy of the State, Live Free or Die Hard, and The Foreigner.

== Filmography ==
TV writer

Year	Title	Notes
1986	G.I. Joe: A Real American Hero	Episode "Grey Hairs and Growing Pains" (Story/Teleplay)

Feature film

Year	Title	Director	Writer	Executive Producer
1993	The Harvest	Yes	Yes	No
1998	Enemy of the State	No	Yes	No
2007	Live Free or Die Hard	No	Story	No
2013	Collision	Yes	Yes	No
2015	The Contract	No	Story	Yes
2017	The Foreigner	No	Yes	Yes

== Bibliography ==
- Agent 13: The Midnight Avenger (1986-1988)
