= Vero Beach Dodgers =

- 1980–2008; Vero Beach, Florida
Team logo
Cap insignia

Minor league affiliations
- Class: Class A-Advanced (1990–2008); Class A (1980-1989)
- League: Florida State League (1980–2008)
- Division: South Division

Major league affiliations
- Team: Tampa Bay Devil Rays (2007–2008); Los Angeles Dodgers (1980–2006)

Minor league titles
- League titles (2): 1983; 1990

Team data
- Name: Vero Beach Devil Rays (2007–2008); Vero Beach Dodgers (1980–2006)
- Colors: Dodger blue, white, red, green, yellow
- Ballpark: Holman Stadium (1980–2008)

The Vero Beach Dodgers, renamed the Vero Beach Devil Rays from 2007–2008, were a minor league baseball team based in Vero Beach, Florida. They played in the Class A-Advanced Florida State League from 1980–2008, at which point they relocated to Port Charlotte, Florida as the Charlotte Stone Crabs. They played their home games at Holman Stadium.

As their names imply, Vero Beach was affiliated with two different Major League Baseball teams during their existence: the Los Angeles Dodgers from 1980–2006 and the Tampa Bay Devil Rays from 2007–2008. Vero Beach won Florida State League championships in 1983 and 1990.

== History ==
Founded in 1980 as the Vero Beach Dodgers, the team was affiliated with the Los Angeles Dodgers Major League Baseball team from 1980–2006. They played their home games at Holman Stadium, which had served as Los Angeles' spring training facility since 1953.

In 2007 the franchise's affiliation changed to the Tampa Bay Devil Rays; they were then renamed the Vero Beach Devil Rays. After the 2008 season Tampa Bay moved their Class A-Advanced affiliate to Port Charlotte, where they became known as the Charlotte Stone Crabs.

== Notable alumni ==
- Mike Piazza (1990) Inducted, Baseball Hall of Fame, 2016
- Pedro Astacio (1990-1991)
- Rocco Baldelli (2007–2008)
- Adrian Beltre (1997, 2001) 4x MLB All-Star
- Chad Billingsley (2004) MLB All-Star
- Pat Borders (2006) 1992 World Series Most Valuable Player
- Sid Bream (1981)
- Jonathan Broxton (2004) 2x MLB All-Star
- Ron Coomer (2003) MLB All-Star
- Alex Cora (1997)
- Wade Davis (2007) 3x MLB All-Star
- Mariano Duncan (1983) MLB All-Star
- Sid Fernandez (1982) 2x MLB All-Star
- John Franco (1981) 4x MLB All-Star
- Eric Gagne (1998) 3x MLB All-Star; 2003 NL Cy Young Award
- Matt Garza (2008)
- Juan Guzman (1986) MLB All-Star
- Matt Herges (1994)
- Darren Holmes (1986)
- Jay Howell (1992) 3x MLB All-Star
- Todd Hundley (2003) 2x MLB All-Star
- Scott Kazmir (2008) 3x MLB All-Star
- Matt Kemp (2004-2005) 2x MLB All-Star
- Paul Lo Duca (1993, 1996) 4x MLB All-Star
- James Loney (2002)
- Fred McGriff (2003) 5x MLB All-Star
- Russell Martin (2004) 4x MLB All-Star
- Ramon Martinez (1987, 1996) MLB All-Star
- Jose Offerman (1988) 2x MLB All-Star
- Alejandro Pena (1986) 1984 NL ERA Leader
- Carlos Pena (2008) MLB All-Star
- David Price (2008) 5x MLB All-Star; 2012 AL Cy Young Award
- Dennys Reyes (1994-1995)
- Dave Roberts (2004) 2016 NL Manager of the Year
- David Ross (1999)
- Steve Sax (1980) 5x MLB All-Star; 1982 NL Rookie of the Year
- Franklin Stubbs (1982)
- John Tudor (1989)
- Shane Victorino (2001) 2x MLB All-Star
- Bob Welch (1985) 2x MLB All-Star; 1990 AL Cy Young Award
- John Wetteland (1987) 3x MLB All-Star
- Wesley Wright
- Eric Young (1990) MLB All-Star
- Ben Zobrist (2008) 3x MLB All-Star; 2016 World Series Most Valuable Player
