= Historic Dodgertown =

Sports facility in Florida, United States

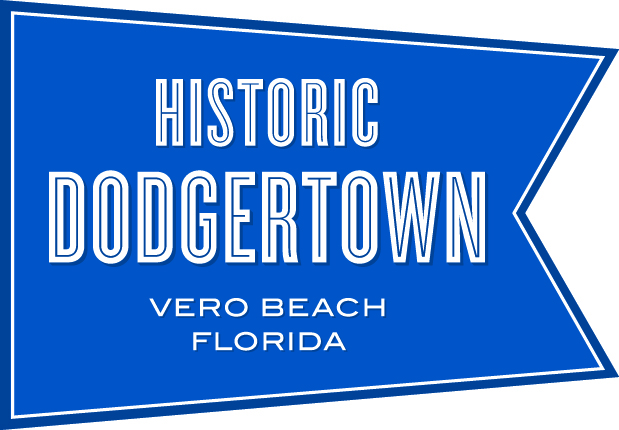
- Type: Private
- Industry: Sports; Entertainment; Hospitality
- Founded: Vero Beach, Florida, United States (January 1, 1948; 78 years ago)
- Founder: Branch Rickey, Walter O'Malley, Peter O'Malley
- Headquarters: 3901 26th Street,, Vero Beach, Florida, United States
- Key people: Peter O'Malley (President and CEO)
- Products: Sport venue Hotel; Sports; Basketball courts Baseball fields Softball fields Pool; Locker rooms Concession stands
- Services: Events
- Website: historicdodgertown.com

Historic Dodgertown was a multi-sport facility in Vero Beach, Florida where athletes of all ages and skill levels had the opportunity to train, play, and stay together. The facility which included the historic Holman Stadium was originally created as a Navy housing base, and was transformed into the home of spring training for Los Angeles Dodgers baseball team, as well as the Vero Beach Dodgers from 1980 to 2006, and the Vero Beach Devil Rays from 2007 to 2008. It evolved into a multi-sport destination that includes an option of room and board via their on-site villas.

== HistoryФ ==
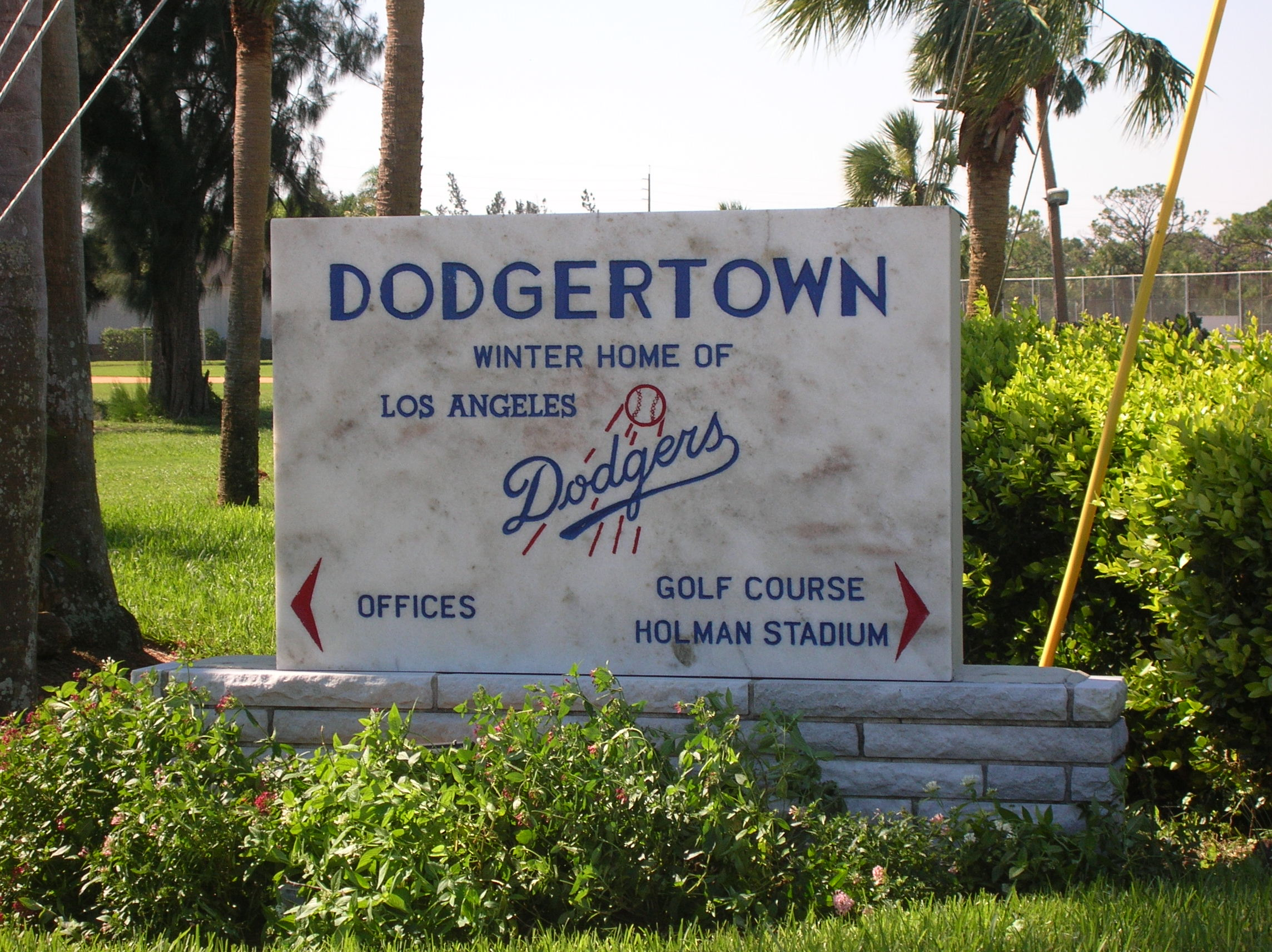
Dodgertown signage.

Historic Dodgertown was originally built as a Navy housing base for all of the members of the Navy and Marines that trained at the US Naval Air Station during World War II that was located directly across the street.

When Branch Rickey began looking for a permanent spring training site in 1948 he was introduced to a large area of land in Vero Beach, Florida by Bud Holman, a local businessman, as the perfect place to host a fully contained training camp for the Major League club as well as the other 26 minor league teams. The Dodgers and the city of Vero Beach ended up coming to an initial five-year lease agreement that included the naming of the property as "Dodger Town". A stadium was completed in 1953.

The Sporting News reports on the innovative spring training camp to be run by the Brooklyn Dodgers in Vero Beach, Florida. “Mass production and the assembly line have come to baseball and now comes Dodger Town, where at least 400 Brooklyn farmhands will be in action during the month. Dodger Town is one of the most prominent set-ups in the history of baseball. There are, at the moment, only three diamonds here, but it’s probable that more will be laid out. The citizens of Vero Beach have collaborated about 200 percent with the Dodgers, hopeful that (Dodger President Branch) Rickey will stick to his half promise to bring Dodgers and Montreal here to train in 1949.”

When he became Dodger President on October 26, 1950, Walter O’Malley continued to invest in and develop Dodgertown, keeping the initial concept of a baseball school from Branch Rickey, but enhancing its features to cater to the needs of the players, coaches, staff, and press. It was also the most fan friendly of the spring sites with access to players. O’Malley strived for the best food service, medical facilities, training techniques, stadium, landscaping, and a wide variety of on-site recreational opportunities. In 1965, with the purchase of 110.4 acres of land from Vero Beach, the Dodgers became the only major league team in Florida to own and maintain their spring training site. In 1972, the O’Malley family continued to modernize and maintain Dodgertown with new living accommodations to replace the U.S. Naval Air Station barracks. In 1974, they added a 23,000-square foot administration building with a Major League clubhouse, medical department, dining room, kitchen, main lobby, broadcasting studio, photo darkroom, press room, lounge, training rooms, equipment room, minor league clubhouse and laundry room. Beginning in 1975, Charlie Blaney, Director, Dodgertown (1974-1987) named street signs for Dodger Hall of Famers. That year, Jackie Robinson Avenue, Roy Campanella Boulevard and Sandy Koufax Lane were named. Subsequently, upon a Dodgers’ election to the Hall of Fame, more streets were named (including legendary Dodger broadcasters Vin Scully and Jaime Jarrin). In 1977, Harrison Conference Services was hired to manage the use of Dodgertown for business conferences, seminars and meetings on a year-round basis. In 1990, more improvements were made by Peter O’Malley including an indoor batting tunnel and Spring Training office building. In 1991, two full-size baseball fields (Nos. 5 & 6) were added after a land exchange with the City of Vero Beach.

The Dodgers trained at Dodgertown for 60 years and it was the starting point for preparation for their World Championship seasons in 1955, 1959, 1963, 1965, 1981 and 1988, as well as 14 National League Pennant-winning teams.

In 1948 when Dodgertown was created, Branch Rickey was Dodger President and a 25 percent Dodger stockholder. Walter O’Malley was also a 25 percent Dodger stockholder in 1948 when Dodgertown began, became the team’s majority owner in 1950 and was Dodger Chairman of the Board upon his passing on August 9, 1979. Peter O’Malley served as Director, Dodgertown from 1962-65, became President, Los Angeles Dodgers at Dodgertown on March 17, 1970, and was responsible for Dodgertown until the family sold the Dodgers to the FOX Group on March 19, 1998. He later became responsible for Historic Dodgertown – Vero Beach, Florida again in January, 2012. At the time it was called “Vero Beach Sports Village”. On August 29, 2013, it was officially renamed “Historic Dodgertown” until Major League Baseball changed it under its leadership on April 2, 2019 to the Jackie Robinson Training Complex.

== Integration ==
The date of March 31, 1948 resonates in the advancement of U.S. civil rights as on that date Dodgertown, Vero Beach, Florida was the first integrated spring training site in the South as the major league Dodgers played their initial game on base against the Montreal Royals, top farm club in the International League. Because of African American Jackie Robinson’s presence, the Dodgers had trained overseas in 1947 (Havana) and in 1948 (Ciudad Trujillo, Dominican Republic) to help shield him from the Jim Crow laws in the South. When the Dodgers made their first appearance in Vero Beach, Robinson was joined on the major league roster that day by fellow African American Roy Campanella. March 31, 1948 marked the first time an African American player on a major league roster played an exhibition game in Florida. This was the beginning of the Dodgers integrating Dodgertown, a city within a city (Vero Beach), so all their players could train, dine, sleep and participate in recreational activities on site.

A crowd of 6,000 (larger than the entire population of Vero Beach) attended the March 31, 1948 game at “Ebbets Field No. 2” including an estimated 1,000 African American fans who were segregated to sit behind the left field area and towards center field. Robinson, who had debuted with the Dodgers on April 15, 1947 and was 1947 Rookie of the Year, hit a home run in his first at-bat at Dodgertown and the Dodgers beat Montreal in the exhibition game, 5-4. Six future Baseball Hall of Famers played that day: Pee Wee Reese, Arky Vaughan, Duke Snider, Gil Hodges, Jackie Robinson and Roy Campanella. Other Hall of Famers who were there: Dodger Manager Leo Durocher; Dodger scout and Coach George Sisler; Dodger President Branch Rickey; Rickey’s ownership partner and Dodger Vice President and General Counsel Walter O’Malley; as well as Dodger broadcasters Red Barber and Ernie Harwell.

== Holman Stadium ==
Shortly after Walter O’Malley began his presidency of the Dodgers on October 26, 1950, his desire to make Dodgertown, Vero Beach, Florida a long term home for the Dodgers became evident. On January 31, 1952, the Dodgers signed a 21-year lease agreement with the City of Vero Beach to make Dodgertown their spring training site for decades. Another 21-year lease term could also be renewed. Given that certainty and in friendship with civic leaders, O’Malley proceeded to privately build a 5,000-seat ballpark in 1952 that opened March 11, 1953 on the Dodgertown grounds. In addition, during the construction process, a man-made, heart-shaped lake stocked with fish was created as a valentine to O’Malley’s wife Kay.

Opened March 11, 1953, Holman Stadium was named for longtime business leader Bud Holman of Vero Beach, Florida. Holman suggested to the Brooklyn Dodgers that an abandoned U.S. Naval Air Station in Vero Beach might fit the needs of the Dodgers’ spring training operations as the expansive land included the former barracks. Dodger President Walter O’Malley worked closely with highly respected engineer Capt. Emil Praeger to design Holman Stadium by taking the sand, marl, and muck to create a nearby manmade lake and then forming the bowl of the concrete stadium.

The New York Times addressed Holman Stadium’s grand opening: “The dedication of the Dodgers’ beautiful little Holman Stadium today was a rousing success on all counts. Among the notables attending the first game at Holman Stadium was Bud Holman, the man who convinced the Dodgers to have their Spring Training in Vero Beach; Baseball Commissioner Ford Frick; National League President Warren Giles and American League President Will Harridge and Connie Mack, long-time manager and owner of the Philadelphia Athletics. Pre-game ceremonies caused the game to start 30 minutes late. Dodger President Walter O’Malley presented a plaque to Holman that read, ‘The Brooklyn Dodgers dedicate Holman Stadium to honor Bud L. Holman of the friendly city of Vero Beach. Walter F. O’Malley, President, Emil H. Praeger, C.E. designer.’ The Dodgers won the game 4-2 as Carl Erskine made the first pitch and allowed one run in four innings.”

From the time it was built by O’Malley, Holman Stadium was appreciated for its unparalleled sight lines, intimate surroundings with 50 Royal Palm trees, donated by Dodger stockholder Mary Louise “May” Smith, the widow of Pfizer President John L. Smith who had been a Dodger part-owner for six years. The trees were located just beyond the outfield, and fans’ ability to see the players were as a result of dugouts that did not have traditional roofs and enclosures. The historical marker at the site specifically notes the preservation of these mid-century landscape elements, including the original lake and palm trees, as part of the complex's heritage. But, due to Jim Crow laws in the South, Holman Stadium was segregated with African American fans sitting down the right field line. In January, 1962, when Dodger star player Tommy Davis and others brought this to the attention of Peter O’Malley, who was beginning his first spring as Director, Dodgertown, he took immediate action with the removal of all segregated signage for drinking fountains, restrooms, and integration of the grandstands, inviting all fans to sit anywhere they wanted within Holman Stadium.

The Sporting News reported, “Where seating in the baseball stadium here has always been segregated, Walter O’Malley removed the signs this year, inviting Negroes to sit anywhere in the park. Perhaps 99 per cent continue to occupy the old Jim Crow seats but, slowly, more are expected to make the shift. In town, O’Malley’s popularity hasn’t thickened.”

Already pioneers in integration due to the signing of Jackie Robinson, the Dodgers continued to break ground and lead the way becoming Major League Baseball’s first fully-integrated spring training site in the South. No other Florida spring training camp would have integrated housing and dining facilities until 1962. Also, the Dodgers’ integration of Holman Stadium was seven years in advance of Vero Beach public schools becoming integrated in 1969.

From the first game, Holman Stadium served as home of the Dodgers spring training games from 1953 to 2008, as well as for the Florida State League’s Single-A Vero Beach Dodgers from 1980-2006. Holman Stadium was updated and is still used at MLB’s Jackie Robinson Training Complex for games, tournaments, and special events.

== Golf Courses ==
As far back as 1953-54, Dodger President Walter O’Malley built a makeshift pitch-and-putt golf course around the heart-shaped lake at Dodgertown for Dodger players. He took it to another level in 1966 when he dedicated the first public golf course (nine-hole Dodgertown Golf Club) in Vero Beach, Florida. O’Malley added a second public golf course in 1971 (18-hole Safari Pines Country Club, later renamed Dodger Pines Country Club), primarily to give all Dodgers a way to relax and enjoy recreation off the field since the two local courses were private and not integrated.

“Dodgertown is unique,” said Peter O’Malley. “Because it was a community within a community, the major and minor league players were housed and dined together, frequently interacting, which brought everyone together at this most important time of the year. African American players were excluded from playing on the two existing local golf courses, so my Dad (Walter O’Malley) privately built two golf courses – a nine-hole and an 18-hole – enabling all the players to participate.”

A Florida Historic Marker was unveiled at the site on November 8, 2025.

== International ==
Walter and Peter O’Malley welcomed international visitors to Dodgertown to train, stay, observe, and meet. The Tokyo Yomiuri Giants were invited by Dodger President Walter O’Malley to send their manager and two players to Dodgertown in the spring of 1957, following the 30-day Dodgers 1956 Goodwill Tour to Japan. Yomiuri guests included Japan Baseball Hall of Fame Manager Shigeru Mizuhara, pitcher Sho Horiuchi, catcher Shigeru Fujio, and Yomiuri Shimbun sports columnist Sotaro Suzuki, a Japan Baseball Hall of Fame member. In 1961, the entire Giants team trained at Dodgertown and Peter O’Malley was responsible for the Giants’ schedule and all arrangements from arrival to departure. That was the first visit by Yomiuri all-time greats Sadaharu Oh and Shigeo Nagashima.

The Giants returned to train at Dodgertown in 1967, 1971, 1975, and 1981. Four times after training at Dodgertown, the Giants won the Japan Series championship. In 1988, a second Nippon Professional Baseball team, the Chunichi Dragons of Nagoya, was invited by Dodger President Peter O’Malley to train at Dodgertown. A total of 21 Japan Baseball Hall of Famers have trained and visited Dodgertown. From February 17-March 1, 1994, prestigious Waseda University of Tokyo became the first amateur team to train alongside the Dodgers. Waseda was coached by legendary Renzo Ishii, Japan Baseball Hall of Famer. The baseball team from Meiji University of Tokyo, one of Big 6 Tokyo League teams, twice visited Historic Dodgertown to train (2013 and 2016).

On five occasions, the professional Samsung Lions of the Korea Baseball Organization held spring training at Dodgertown (1985, 1992, 1993, 1996, and 1997) during Peter O’Malley’s presidency. The Lions and Dodgers played an exhibition game at Holman Stadium on March 9, 1985, marking the first Korean professional team to play against a U.S. major league team. The Dodgers won 7-0 with Baseball Commissioner Peter Ueberroth and Korea Baseball Commissioner General Jyong-Chul Suh taking part in first pitch ceremonies. Bowie Kuhn, former Major League Baseball Commissioner (1969-1984), also attended.

The professional SK Wyverns of Incheon, South Korea, now known as SSG Landers, visited Historic Dodgertown seven times between 2012-2018 for training in preparation for their KBO season during the time Peter O’Malley was chairman. In 2018, the Wyverns won the Korea Series Championship. In February, 1996, the Hanyang University baseball team from Seoul, South Korea arrived in Dodgertown upon O’Malley’s invitation to train and receive instruction from Dodger coaches.

International visitors, including baseball owners, executives, coaches, umpires, players, medical personnel and broadcasters/writers, came to Dodgertown from Japan, the Netherlands, Mexico, Italy, Dominican Republic, Nicaragua, South Korea, Russia, People’s Republic of China, Ireland, and Nigeria.

== St. Patrick's Day Celebrations ==
Irish American Walter O’Malley began a tradition of celebrating St. Patrick’s Day in Vero Beach with a first 1952 party at the Hall of Giants around a unique 35-foot, one-piece mahogany table from the Philippines at McKee Jungle Gardens, a popular tourist destination. In 1953, the St. Patrick’s Day parties moved to Dodgertown and continued throughout the decades, hosted by the O’Malley family.

“St. Patrick’s Day was the only event of the spring under my Dad,” said Peter O’Malley; “It was well known in the industry to be at Dodgertown on March 17. Everyone looked forward to it – staff, secretaries, visitors, league presidents, commissioners would be in Vero Beach. No players were invited. It started in the old Recreation Hall, then to the restaurant and we brought it nearby to the dining room.”

== Florida Heritage Landmark ==
On November 10, 2014 during the 53rd Los Angeles Dodgers Adult Baseball Camp at Historic Dodgertown, Vero Beach, Florida, the site was recognized by the state as a “Florida Heritage Landmark” and a permanent marker was placed on the path leading to the original main conference building and dining room. The marker, coordinated by Ruth Stanbridge, president, Indian River County Historical Society, with support from the Tourist Development Council of Indian River County and the Florida Department of State, recognizing the broad importance of Dodgertown to the Treasure Coast community, extending far beyond baseball. The two-sided marker celebrates “Baseball and Dodgertown” and the significant activities that took place, as Dodgertown was Major League Baseball’s first fully-integrated Spring Training site in the South.

== Civil Rights Trail Recognition ==
Historic Dodgertown is the only sports site when named on January 31, 2019 to the U.S. Civil Rights Trail, whose motto is “What Happened Here Changed the World”. It is a list of significant locations in the U.S. to the American Civil Rights Movement. The U.S. Civil Rights Trail is a collection of churches, courthouses, schools, museums and other landmarks primarily in the Southern states where activists challenged segregation in the 1950s and 1960s to advance social justice.

== Dodgertown's Directors ==
- Spencer Harris (1948-53)
- Edgar Allen (1954-59)
- Leon Hamilton (1960-61)
- Chick Walmsley (1961)
- Peter O’Malley (1962-65)
- John Stanfill (1965)
- Dick Bird (1965-1974)
- Charlie Blaney (1974-87)
- Terry Reynolds (1987-88)
- Craig Callan (1988-2018)

== Transition to Jackie Robinson Training Complex ==
The Dodgers played their final spring training home game at Holman Stadium on March 17, 2008. Dodger ownership under Frank and Jamie McCourt left Vero Beach after the Dodgers’ involvement for 60 years to go to Glendale, Arizona for future spring training camps. After sitting dormant for nine months, in May, 2009, Minor League Baseball (MiLB) agreed to operate the site as “Vero Beach Sports Village”. It reopened the property with teams, tournaments and umpire schools participating in year-round activities.

But, after two years of incurring significant losses, MiLB was about to shutter the Vero Beach Sports Village site. The former Dodgertown was preparing to be shuttered for a second time since 2008. That is when Peter O’Malley, President, Los Angeles Dodgers (1970-1998), his sister Terry O’Malley Seidler, along with Dodger pioneer pitchers Chan Ho Park and Hideo Nomo formed a partnership to become responsible on January 1, 2012. By investing in and saving the property, Chairman O’Malley worked closely with the Vero Beach community and county leaders to ensure its long-term future. Indian River County built a new quad for softball/youth baseball fields and a multi-purpose field (110 x 130 yards) was also established that accommodated football, lacrosse, soccer and rugby. These infrastructure modifications were made to expand the range of sports hosted at the site beyond its original baseball focus.

On August 29, 2013, O’Malley announced that the name would be changed to “Historic Dodgertown – Vero Beach, Florida” in order to celebrate the world-famous Dodgertown name established over the course of six-plus decades. For the next five years, Historic Dodgertown continued as a multi-sport training site for professional, amateur and youth sports and all ages. Athletes stayed, dined and trained at Historic Dodgertown, often likened to a small college campus, while enjoying its recreational activities including a competitive-sized swimming pool.

Intent on finding the perfect successor to carry Historic Dodgertown into the future, O’Malley and Major League Baseball discussed the site for more than two years until MLB established a long-term lease agreement with Indian River County and the transition from O’Malley to MLB in December, 2018 was complete. On April 2, 2019, MLB Commissioner Rob Manfred and O’Malley were in Historic Dodgertown to announce the name would be changed to the “Jackie Robinson Training Complex”. Rachel Robinson, Jackie’s widow, along with son David and daughter Sharon attended the press conference announcing the new name.

In Peter O'Malley's opinion, Major League Baseball could be the next chapter for Dodgertown. Commissioner Rob Manfred and his colleagues understand the historical significance of this place. We hope the people of Vero Beach and Indian River County will be very proud of having Major League Baseball members of their community.

== Modern use as Historic Dodgertown and Jackie Robinson Training Complex ==
Historic Dodgertown was a multi-sport destination facility that hosts all levels of a variety of sports including professional teams. Some notable teams that Historic Dodgertown played host to include:

High School and college baseball teams utilized the complex heavily from February through April as a spring break destination as they prepared for their season.

Montreal Alouettes and former NFL player Chad Johnson utilized Historic Dodgertown's facilities for their mini-camp program. Chad Johnson was a member of the team at the time and was present during mini-camp during their stay. The team returned the following year for mini-camp in April 2015 as well.

Edmonton Eskimos utilized Historic Dodgertown's facilities for their mini-camp program in April 2015.

SK Wyverns of the Korea Baseball Organization based in Incheon brought their program to Historic Dodgertown in February 2015. The SK Wyverns are a South Korean based team and are linked to a founding partner of Historic Dodgertown Chan Ho Park who is from South Korea. In addition, from the Chinese Women's National Fast-Pitch Softball Team (Beijing Eagles) trained at Historic Dodgertown in March and in October 2018, and the Chinese Men's National Baseball Team trained in November 2017 and 2018.

In May 2018, Your Call Football, a unique, technically-advanced, and fan-friendly football experience played three games at Historic Dodgertown.

The complex encompasses approximately 110 acres of athletic facilities, which are utilized to host multiple concurrent youth and amateur tournaments throughout the year.

== Historic Dodgertown yearly youth tournaments ==
Historic Dodgertown held various youth baseball tournaments throughout the year, such as:

Treasure Coast Presidents's Day Challenge - Holiday weekend tournament beginning in February that takes place over President's Day or classically referred to as Washington's Birthday.

Memorial Day Invitational - Holiday weekend tournament taking place in May over Memorial Day.

Legends Classic - Week-long tournament in late June that includes a cookout and skills challenge hosted by Historic Dodgertown.

Independence Day Classic - Holiday weekend tournament during Independence Day (United States).

All Star Classic - Week-long tournament hosted in the beginning of August.

Labor Day Beach Bash - Holiday weekend tournament over Labor Day

== Executives ==
- Peter O'Malley - President and CEO, Historic Dodgertown
- Terry O'Malley Seidler - Founding Partner
- Chan Ho Park - Founding Partner
- Hideo Nomo - Founding Partner
- Craig Callan - Senior Vice President
- Jeff Biddle - Vice President
- Steve Snure - Vice President
- Ruth Ruiz - Director, Marketing and Communications

== Jackie Robinson Celebration Game ==
This game hosts two Class A Florida State League teams every year on April 15, to commemorate the date in which Jackie Robinson broke the color barrier in Major League Baseball. On April 15, 2014, the Lakeland Flying Tigers and Brevard County Manatees participated in the first professional regular season game at Holman Stadium since the Vero Beach Devil Rays departed Vero Beach after the 2008 season.

The Brevard County Manatees and St. Lucie Mets participated in the Second Annual Jackie Robinson Celebration Game on April 15, 2015, to a near capacity crowd of 5,915 spectators.

== MLB Elite Development Invitational (renamed the Hank Aaron Invitational) ==
Official Logo

Major League Baseball, USA Baseball, and the Major League Baseball Players Association hosted their first Elite Development Invitational at Historic Dodgertown. This event was created and implemented by MLB for the purpose of revitalizing youth baseball across the United States and Canada. The 150 players invited were ages 13–16 years old from major cities across the United States. The kids were brought to Vero Beach, Florida to develop and hone their skills by some of the best players to play in the MLB. The list of coaches includes:

Maury Wills - "The National League's MVP Award winner in 1962. He won three World Series titles, two Gold Glove Awards and earned seven All-Star berths. He stole 104 bases in 1962, which was a Major League record at the time."

Lee Smith - "Seven-time All-Star pitcher, who held the Major League career saves record for more than a decade before he was passed by Trevor Hoffman in 2006. Smith, at 6-feet-6 and 265 pounds, was a dominant force in baseball throughout the 1980s and '90s."

Dusty Baker - "Former outfielder Dusty Baker, who helped the Dodgers win the World Series in 1981. He was a two-time All-Star, won two Silver Slugger Awards, one Gold Glove and one NL Championship Series MVP Award. He was also a three-time Manager of the Year, taking the Giants, Reds and Cubs to the postseason."

The coaching staff included numerous current and former major league baseball players.

=== MLB executives visit ===
On July 28, 2015, MLB commissioner Rob Manfred visited the camp and spoke to the young participants. Joining him were Harold Reynolds of the MLB Network, CEO and President of Minor League Baseball Pat O'Connor, and Hall of Fame manager Joe Torre. With his visit, Manfred became the 9th Commissioner of Baseball to have visited.

Joe Torre (left) and Harold Reynolds (right) speaking to athletes at Dodgertown in 2015
