= List of Los Angeles Dodgers owners and executives =

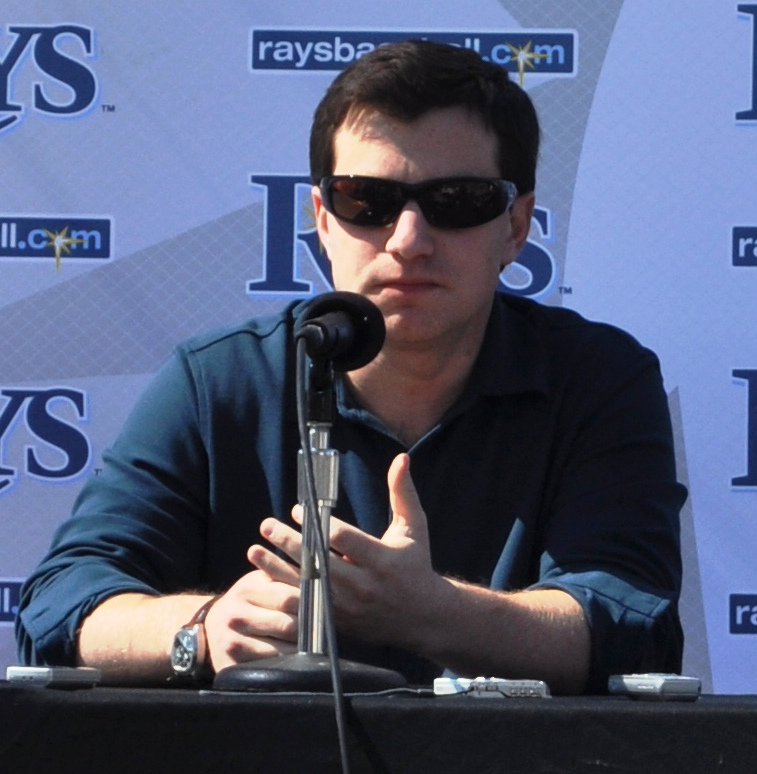
Andrew Friedman is the incumbent President of Baseball Operations for the Los Angeles Dodgers.

The Los Angeles Dodgers are an American professional baseball team.

== Owners ==
#	Name	Years	Notes	Ref
1	Charles Byrne and Ferdinand Abell	1883–1890		
2	Charles Byrne, Ferdinand Abell and George Chauncey	1891–1897	Merger of Brooklyn Bridegrooms and Brooklyn Ward's Wonders	
3	Charles Ebbets and Ferdinand Abell	1897–1898	Byrne dies, his shares & Chauncey's bought by Ebbets & Abell	
4	Charles Ebbets, Ferdinand Abell, Harry Von der Horst, Ned Hanlon	1899–1904	Merger of Brooklyn Superbas and Baltimore Orioles	
5	Charles Ebbets, Ferdinand Abell, Henry Medicus, Ned Hanlon	1905–1906	Ebbets & Medicus buy out Von der Horst	
6	Charles Ebbets and Henry Medicus	1907–1912	Ebbets & Medicus buy out Abell & Hanlon	
7	Charles Ebbets, Ed McKeever and Stephen McKeever	1912–1925	Ebbets & The McKeevers buy out Medicus	
8	Stephen McKeever, Grace Slade Ebbets, Joseph Gilleaudeau and Brooklyn Trust Company	1925–1938	Ebbets & Ed McKeever die; team becomes officially known as the Dodgers in 1932	
9	James Mulvey & Dearie Mulvey, Grace Slade Ebbets, Joseph Gilleaudeau and Brooklyn Trust Company	1938–1944	Stephen McKeever dies, shares inherited by the Mulveys	
10	Branch Rickey, Walter O'Malley, James Lawrence Smith, and James Mulvey & Dearie Mulvey	1945–1950	Rickey, O'Malley & Smith buy out the Ebbets Estate	
11	Walter O'Malley, Mrs. Smith and James Mulvey & Dearie Mulvey	1950–1958	James Smith dies, leaving his shares to his wife; O'Malley buys out Rickey	
12	Walter O'Malley and James Mulvey & Dearie Mulvey	1958–1975	Dodgers move to Los Angeles, Mrs. Smith sells her shares to O'Malley & the Mulveys	
13	Walter O'Malley	1975–1979	O'Malley buys out the Mulveys	
14	Peter O'Malley and Terry Seidler	1979–1997	Walter O'Malley dies, shares inherited by Peter O'Malley & Terry Seidler	
15	Fox Entertainment Group	1998–1999	Fox purchases the team	
16	Fox Entertainment Group and Robert Daly	1999–2004	Daly buys minority share in team	
17	Frank McCourt	2004–2012	McCourt purchases Dodgers from Fox & Daly	
18	Guggenheim Baseball Management (Mark Walter, Magic Johnson, Stan Kasten, Peter Guber, Bobby Patton and Todd Boehly)	2012–2018	Guggenheim Group purchases Dodgers after bankruptcy court proceedings	
19	Guggenheim Baseball Management (Mark Walter, Magic Johnson, Stan Kasten, Peter Guber, Bobby Patton, Todd Boehly) and Billie Jean King & Ilana Kloss	2018–2019	King & Kloss buy a minority share of team	
20	Guggenheim Baseball Management (Mark Walter, Magic Johnson, Stan Kasten, Peter Guber, Bobby Patton, Todd Boehly) and Billie Jean King, Ilana Kloss, Alan Smolinisky & Robert L. Plummer	2019–present	Smolinisky & Plummer buy a share of team	

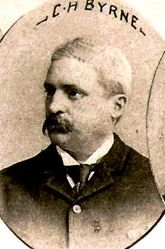
Co-founder Charlie Byrne

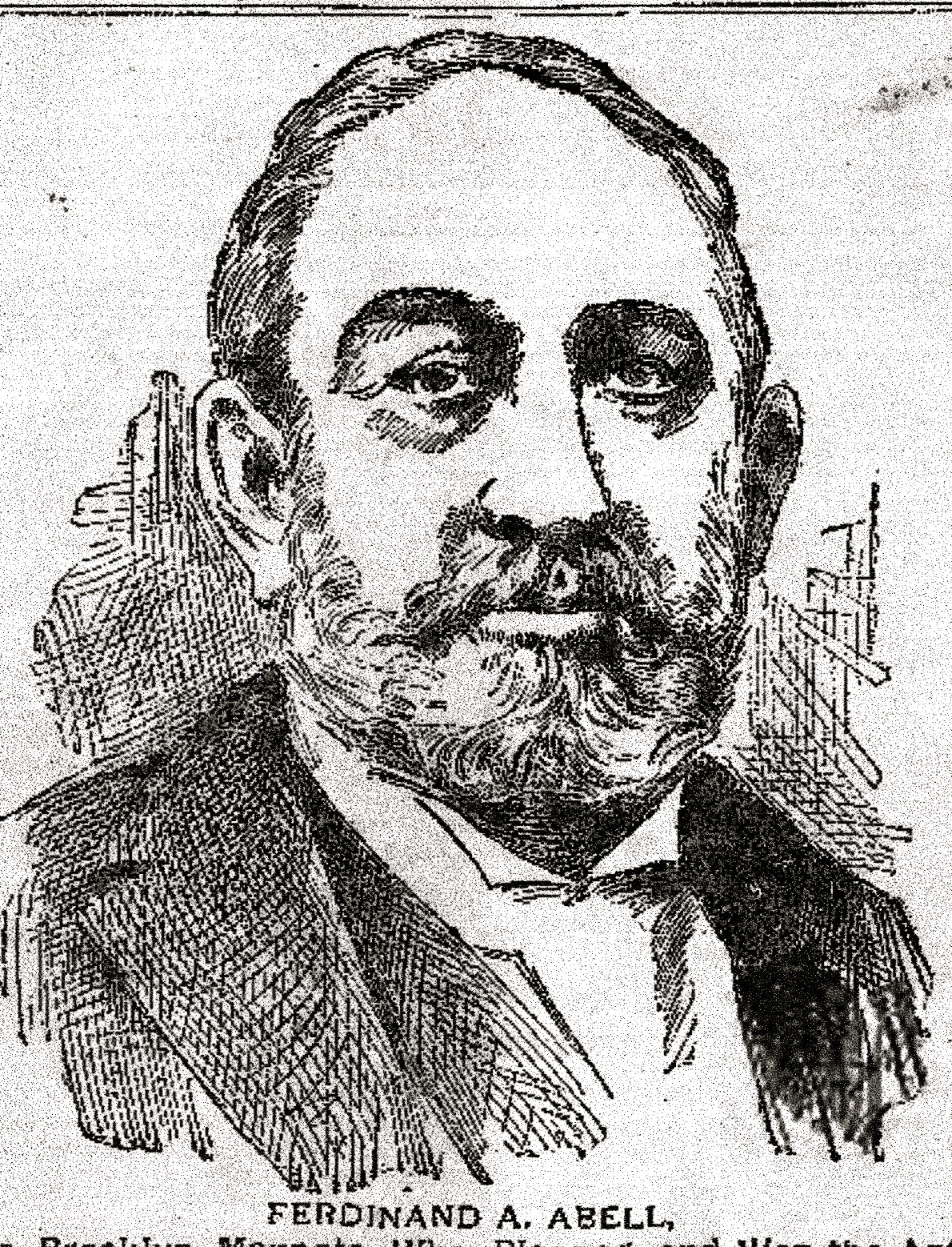
Co-founder Ferdinand Abell

Former Dodger owners Charles Ebbets and Ed McKeever

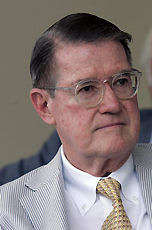
Peter O'Malley

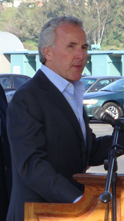
Frank McCourt

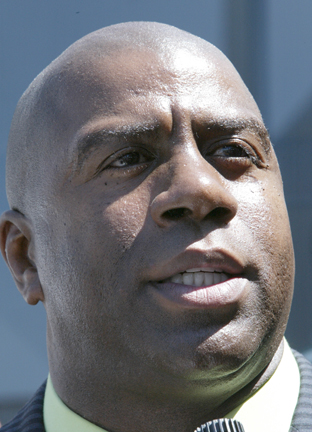
Magic Johnson

== Chairmen ==
#	Name	Seasons	Notes	Ref
1	Walter O'Malley	1970–1979	Walter O'Malley steps down as President and assumes newly created position of Chairman	
2	Peter O'Malley	1980–1998	Walter O'Malley dies, his son Peter succeeds him	
3	Robert Daly	1999–2004	Minority Owner Robert Daly becomes Chairman	
4	Frank McCourt	2004–2012	New Owner Frank McCourt becomes chairman	
5	Mark Walter	2012–present	Controlling Partner of Guggenheim Baseball Management	

== Presidents ==
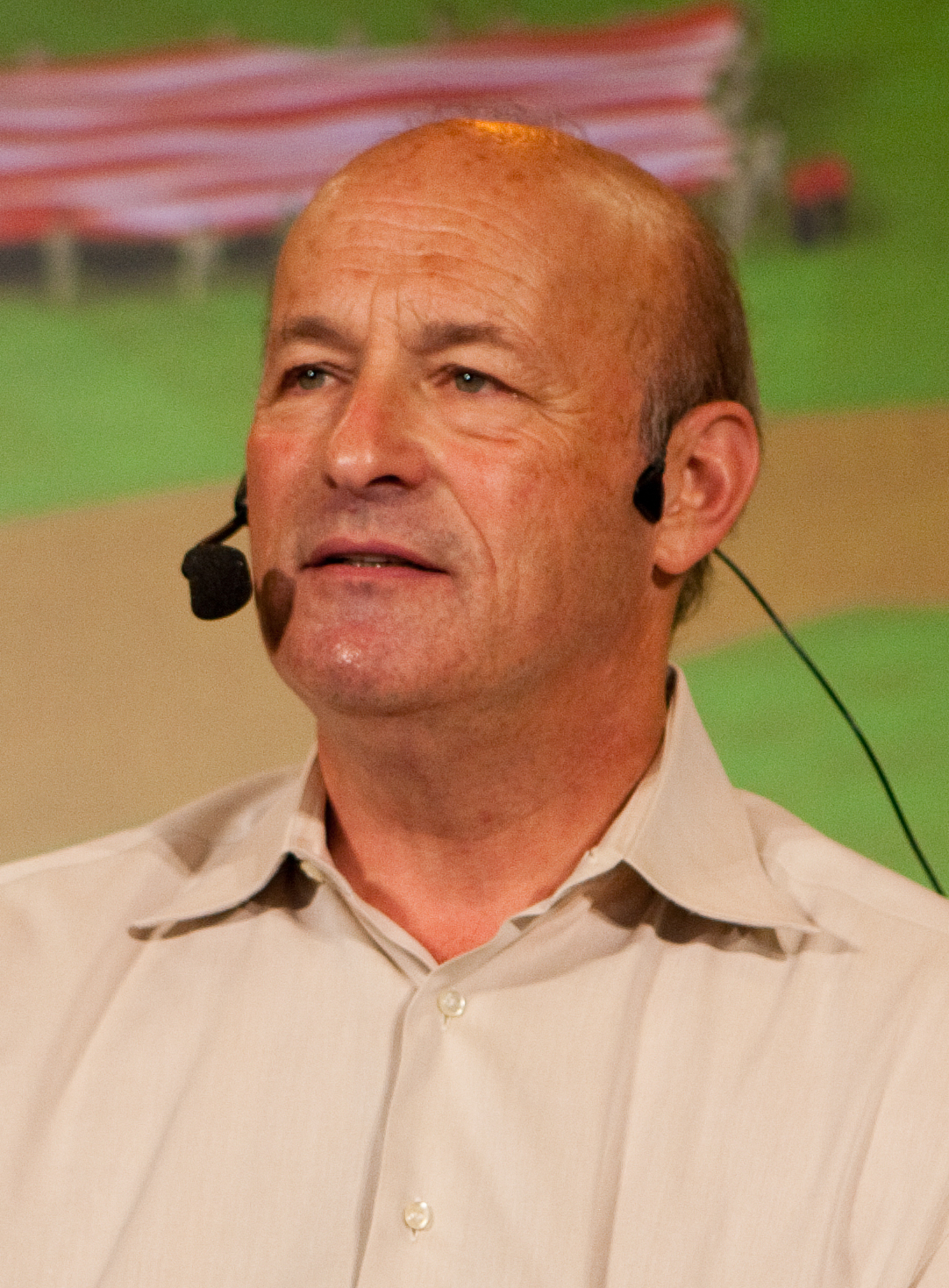
Incumbent Dodgers team president Stan Kasten

#	Name	Seasons	Notes	Ref
1	Charlie Byrne	1890–1897		
2	Charles Ebbets	1898–1925	elected president upon Byrne's death	
3	Ed McKeever	1925	acting president upon Ebbets death	
4	Wilbert Robinson	1925–1930	elected president upon McKeever's death	
5	Frank York	1930–1932		
6	Stephen McKeever	1932–1938		
7	Larry MacPhail	1938–1942		
8	Branch Rickey	1942–1950	succeeds MacPhail, who quit to join the army	
9	Walter O'Malley	1950–1970		
10	Peter O'Malley	1970–1997	Walter O'Malley steps down to become Chairman, his son Peter succeeds him	
11	Bob Graziano	1998–2004	appointed President by Fox Entertainment Group	
12	Jamie McCourt	2004–2009	appointed President by her husband, Frank	
13	Dennis Mannion	2009–2010		
14	Stan Kasten	2012–present	The team had no official president from 2010-2012	

== General managers ==
The Dodgers did not employ a general manager until 1950. Before then, the team President had the duties commonly associated with the GM. There was also no general manager between 2018 and 2021, as the President of Baseball Operations took GM duties during this period.

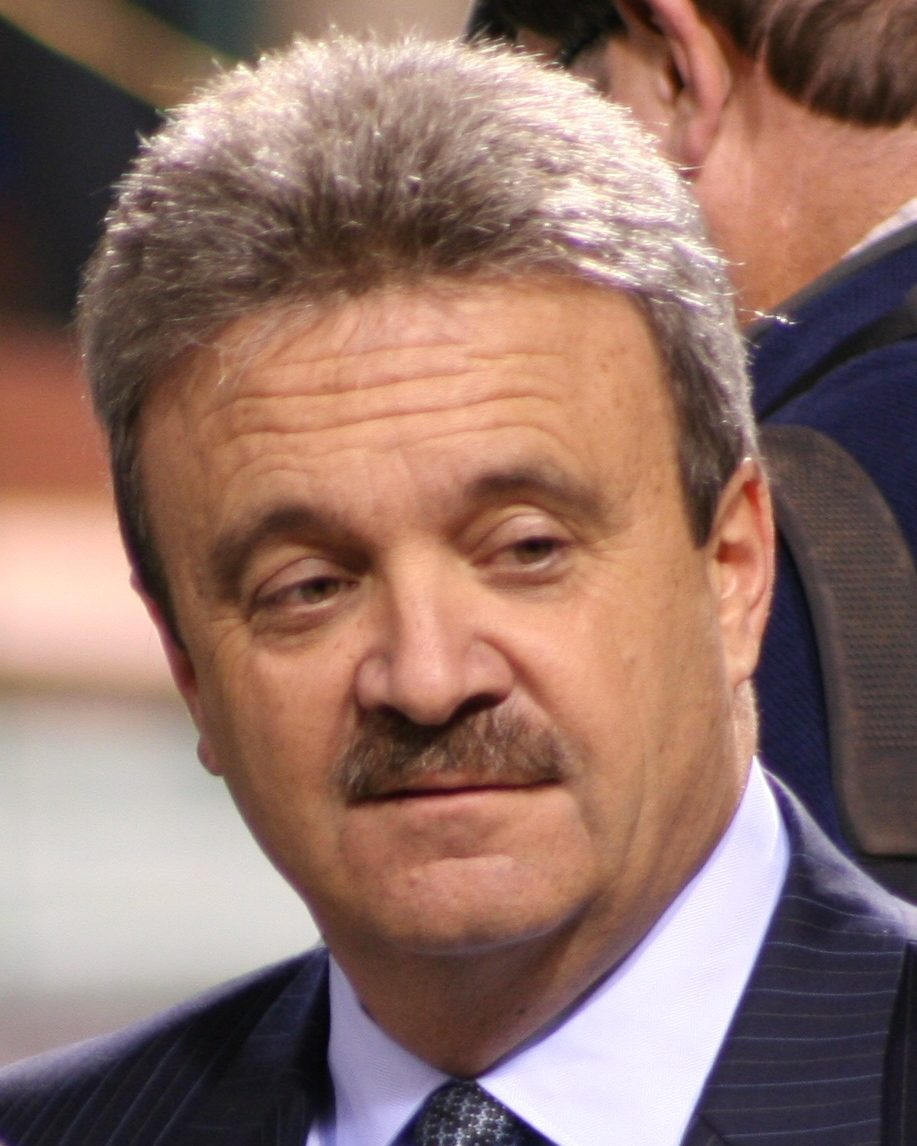
Former GM Ned Colletti

#	Name	Seasons	Notes	Ref
1	Branch Rickey	1950		
2	Buzzie Bavasi	1951–1968	Won 8 NL Pennants & 4 World Series	
3	Fresco Thompson	1968	Died shortly after taking job	
4	Al Campanis	1968–1987	Won 4 NL Pennants & 1 World Series	
5	Fred Claire	1987–1998	Won 1 NL Pennant & 1 World Series	
6	Tommy Lasorda	1998	Interim	
7	Kevin Malone	1999–2001		
8	Dave Wallace	2001	Interim	
9	Dan Evans	2001–2004		
10	Paul DePodesta	2004–2005		
11	Ned Colletti	2005–2014		
12	Farhan Zaidi	2014–2018	Won 2 NL Pennants	
13	Brandon Gomes	2022–present	Won 2 NL Pennants & 2 World Series	

== Executive Office personnel ==
Name	Position	Ref
Caroline Perry	Executive Vice-President & Chief Operating Officer	
Lon Rosen	Executive VP & Chief Marketing Officer	
Royce Cohen	Executive VP, Chief Business Officer	
Janet Marie Smith	Executive VP, Planning and Development	
Nichol McKenzie-Whiteman	Chief Executive Officer, Los Angeles Dodgers Foundation	
Erik Braverman	Senior VP, Marketing, Community Relations & Broadcasting	
Joseph Crowley	Senior VP, Stadium Operations	
Ralph Esquibel	Senior VP, Information Technology	
Eric Hernandez	Senior VP, Finance	
Daniel Martens	Senior VP, General Counsel	
Antonio Morici	Senior VP, Ticket & Premium Sales & Service	
Lorenzo Sciarrino	Senior VP, Global Partnerships	

== Baseball Operations personnel ==
Name	Position	Ref
Andrew Friedman	President of Baseball Operations	
Galen Carr	Vice-president, Player Personnel	
Ismael Cruz	Vice-president, International Scouting	
David Finley	Vice President, Scouting	
Billy Gasparino	Vice-president & Assistant General Manager, Baseball Operations	
Ellen Harrigan	Vice President, Baseball Administration	
Damon Jones	Vice-president, Assistant General Manager & Baseball Legal Counsel	
Jeffrey Kingston	Vice President & Assistant General Manager	
Will Rhymes	Vice President, Player Development	
Alex Slater	Vice-president & Assistant General Manager	
Will Rhymes	Vice President, Player Development	
Brandon McDaniel	Vice President, Player Performance	
Yayoi Sato	Vice President, Japanese Player Relations	
Raúl Ibañez	Vice President, Baseball Development & Special Projects	
Scott Akasaki	Senior Director of Team Travel	
Duncan Webb	Senior Director, Baseball Resources	
Jeffrey G. McAvoy	Senior Director, Professional Scouting and Baseball Development	
Megan Schroeder	Senior Director, Performance Science	
Alex Torres	Director, Clubhouse Operations	
Brian McBurney	Director, Baseball Systems Applications	
John Focht	Director, Baseball Systems Platform	
Brian Stoneberg	Director, Minor League Player Performance	
Leo Ruiz	Director, Strong Mind Cultural Development	
Richard Anderson	Director, Quantitative Analysis	
Yuri Akimoto	Director, Baseball Product Development	
Ron Porterfield	Director, Player Health	
Zachary Fitzpatrick	Director, Amateur Scouting	
Matt McGrath	Director, Player Development	
Chris Dunaway	Director, International Athleticism	
Will Ireton	Director, Japanese Player Operations & Strategy	
Patricia Romero-Gilmore	Director, Family Programs	
Ethan Levitt	Director, Baseball Strategy and Information	
Chase Utley	Special Assistant to the President	
Thomas Allison	Special Assistant, Scouting	
Ron Roenicke	Special Assistant to the GM	
John Sears	Senior Advisor	
Chris Woodward	Senior Advisor, Player Development & Major League Operations	
Joel Peralta	Special Assistant, Baseball Operations	
José Vizcaíno	Special Instructor, Infield	
