= 1883 Brooklyn Grays season =

1883 Brooklyn Grays
- Interstate Association Champions
- League: Inter-State Association of Professional Baseball Clubs
- Ballpark: Washington Park
- City: Brooklyn, New York
- Record: 44–28 (.611)
- League place: 1st
- Owners: Charles Byrne, Ferdinand Abell
- President: Charles Byrne
- Manager: Joseph Doyle

The Brooklyn baseball club was formed in 1883 by real estate magnate and baseball enthusiast Charles Byrne who convinced his brother-in-law Joseph Doyle and casino operator Ferdinand Abell to start the team with him. Byrne set up a grandstand on fifth avenue and named it Washington Park in honor of George Washington. The team played in the minor Inter-State Association of Professional Baseball Clubs.

Doyle became the first manager of the team, which drew 6,000 fans to its first home game on May 12, 1883, against the Trenton team. (This was actually the second game the club played in Brooklyn; three days earlier, with Washington Park not yet ready, the Greys beat Harrisburg 7–1 at the Parade Ground. It was the only professional match ever held at the ground, with some 2,000 fans in attendance.) The team won the league title after the Camden Merritt club disbanded on July 20 and Brooklyn picked up some of its better players. The Grays were invited to join the American Association for the following season.

== Season standings ==
Interstate Association	W	L	GB	Pct.
Brooklyn Grays	44	28	–	.611
Camden Merritts	27	8	NA	.711
Harrisburg	43	33	3	.566
Reading Actives	33	35	9	.485
Trenton	34	38	10	.472
Pottsville Anthracites	28	46	17	.378
Wilmington Quicksteps	27	48	18.5	.360

=== Roster ===
1883 Brooklyn Grays
Roster
Barnes; Maurice Bresnahan; Burns; John Campana; Jack Corcoran; Tom Dolan; John Doyle; Jim Egan; John Farrow; Frank Fennelly; John Firth; Billy Geer; Bill Greenwood; Charlie Householder	Sam Kimber; Henry Luff; Tim Manning; John Mccabe; M. McManus; Mellon; Bill Morgan; Miah Murray; Dave Oldfield; Bill Schenck; Edgar Smith; Tony Suck	Adonis Terry; Charles Tuttle; Oscar Walker; West; Wash Williams	Manager: George Taylor
