= Frank York =

Frank B. York (about 1878 in Brooklyn, New York – February 2, 1937, in the Bronx, New York) was the President of the Brooklyn Dodgers of Major League Baseball from 1930 to 1932. He was the son of lawyer Bernard J. York,. He attended Poly Prep in Brooklyn, where he played baseball for the school. He went on to attend Columbia University and Columbia Law School. In 1900, he was named a partner in his father's law firm, which had been handling the legal business of the Dodgers since beginning to represent Charles Ebbets in 1898.

York's legal representation of brothers Stephen and Ed McKeever led to his being handed the job of President after internal disagreements among the Dodgers' front office management led to a settlement imposed by the National League and Wilbert Robinson's resignation as president.

York died on February 2, 1937, of pneumonia after a week-long illness at age 59.

Preceded by Wilbert Robinson	Brooklyn Dodgers President; 1930–1932	Succeeded by Stephen McKeever
