= List of Los Angeles Dodgers managers =

The Los Angeles Dodgers are a Major League Baseball team that plays in the National League Western Division. The Dodgers began play in 1884 as the Brooklyn Atlantics and have been known by seven nicknames since (including the Grays, Grooms, Superbas, and Robins), before adopting the Dodgers name for good in 1932. They played in Brooklyn, New York until their move to Los Angeles in 1958. During the team's existence, they have employed 32 different managers. The duties of the team manager include team strategy and leadership on and off the field.

== Table key ==
#	A running total of the number of Dodgers managers. Any manager who has two or more separate terms is counted only once.
G	Number of postseason games managed; may not equal sum of wins and losses due to tie games
W	Number of regular season wins in games managed
L	Number of regular season losses in games managed
WPct	Winning percentage: number of wins divided by number of games managed
PA	Playoff appearances: number of years this manager has led the franchise to the playoffs
PW	Playoff wins: number of wins this manager has accrued in the playoffs
PL	Playoff losses: number of losses this manager has accrued in the playoffs
LC	League Championships: number of League Championships, or pennants, achieved by the manager
WS	World Series: number of World Series victories achieved by the manager
†	Elected to the National Baseball Hall of Fame

== Managers ==
#^{[a]}	Image	Name	Term	Wins	Losses	WPct	PA	PW	PL	LC	WS	Ref
1		George Taylor	1884	40	64	.384	—	—	—	—	—	
2		Charlie Hackett	1885	15	22	.405	—	—	—	—	—	
3		Charlie Byrne	1885–1887	174	172	.503	—	—	—	—	—	
4		Bill McGunnigle	1888–1890	268	138	.660	2	6	9	2	—	
5		John Montgomery Ward^{†}	1891–1892	156	135	.536	—	—	—	—	—	
6		Dave Foutz	1893–1896	264	257	.507	—	—	—	—	—	
7		Billy Barnie	1897–1898	76	91	.455	—	—	—	—	—	
8		Mike Griffin	1898	1	3	.250	—	—	—	—	—	
9		Charles Ebbets	1898	38	68	.358	—	—	—	—	—	
10		Ned Hanlon^{†}	1899–1905	511	488	.512	—	—	—	2	—	
11		Patsy Donovan	1906–1908	184	270	.405	—	—	—	—	—	
12		Harry Lumley	1909	55	98	.360	—	—	—	—	—	
13		Bill Dahlen	1910–1913	251	355	.428	—	—	—	—	—	
14		Wilbert Robinson^{†}	1914–1931	1,375	1,341	.506	2	3	9	2	—	
15		Max Carey^{†}	1932–1933	146	161	.476	—	—	—	—	—	
16		Casey Stengel^{†}	1934–1936	208	251	.461	—	—	—	—	—	
17		Burleigh Grimes^{†}	1937–1938	131	171	.434	—	—	—	—	—	
18		Leo Durocher^{†}	1939–1946	703	528	.571	1	1	4	1	—	
19		Clyde Sukeforth	1947	2	0	1.000	—	—	—	—	—	
20		Burt Shotton	1947	92	60	.605	1	3	4	1	—	
—		Leo Durocher^{†}	1948	35	37	.486	—	—	—	—	—	
21		Ray Blades	1948	1	0	1.000	—	—	—	—	—	
—		Burt Shotton	1948–1950	234	155	.601	1	1	4	1	—	
22		Chuck Dressen	1951–1953	298	166	.642	2	5	8	2	—	
23		Walter Alston^{†}	1954–1976	2,040	1,613	.558	7	23	21	7	4	
24		Tommy Lasorda^{†}^{[b]}	1976–1996	1,599	1,439	.526	7	31	30	4	2	
25		Bill Russell	1996–1998	173	149	.537	1	—	3	—	—	
26		Glenn Hoffman	1998	47	41	.534	—	—	—	—	—	
27		Davey Johnson	1999–2000	163	161	.503	—	—	—	—	—	
28		Jim Tracy	2001–2005	427	383	.527	1	1	3	—	—	
29		Grady Little	2006–2007	170	154	.525	1	—	3	—	—	
30		Joe Torre^{†}	2008–2010	259	227	.533	2	8	8	—	—	
31		Don Mattingly	2011–2015	446	363	.551	3	8	11	—	—	
32		Dave Roberts	2016–present	1,000	605	.623	10	65	45	5	3	

== Footnotes ==
- ^{a} A running total of the number of Dodgers managers. Thus, any manager who has two or more separate terms is counted only once.
- ^{b} Tommy Lasorda won the Manager of the Year Award in 1983 and 1988.
