= Charles Tuttle =

Charles Tuttle may refer to:

- Charles Wesley Tuttle (1829–1881), American astronomer and brother of Horace Parnell Tuttle
- Charles Tuttle (fl. 1883), baseball player, see 1883 Brooklyn Grays season
- Charles A. Tuttle, economist, the author of The Wealth Concept. A Study in Economic Theory (1891); see Wealth
- Charles H. Tuttle (1879–1971), lawyer and U.S. Attorney for the Southern District of New York
- Charles E. Tuttle (1915–1993), publisher
  - Charles E. Tuttle Company
