= Ed McKeever (baseball owner) =

Left to right: Charles Ebbets, Mrs McKeever, Ed McKeever

Edward J. McKeever (March 19, 1859 in Brooklyn, New York – April 29, 1925 in New York, New York) was a construction contractor in Brooklyn in the early 20th-century. McKeever and his brother Stephen bought half of the Brooklyn Dodgers baseball team from Henry Medicus on January 2, 1912. Together with co-owner Charles Ebbets, they built what became Ebbets Field. McKeever served as vice-president of the Dodgers until Charles Ebbets died of a heart attack on April 18, 1925. McKeever became team president, but despite previously being in good health, he caught a cold at Ebbets' funeral and died of influenza a little more than a week later. He was buried in Holy Cross Cemetery in Brooklyn.

Preceded by Charles Ebbets	Brooklyn Dodgers President; 1925	Succeeded by Wilbert Robinson
