= Harry Von der Horst =

Major League Baseball owner

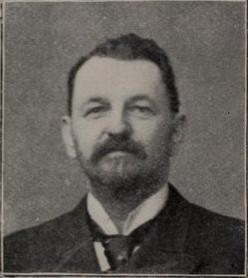
- Von der Horst in the 1899 Spalding Guide
- Born: 1850 or 1851; Baltimore, Maryland, US
- Died: July 28, 1905; Brooklyn, New York, US
- Occupations: Owner of the Baltimore Orioles (1882–1899); Owner of the Brooklyn Superbas (1899–1904, with partners)
- Partner(s): Brooklyn: Charles Ebbets, Ferdinand Abell, Ned Hanlon
- Awards: Baltimore Orioles: 3× NL champion (1894, 1895, 1896); 2× Temple Cup champion (1896, 1897); Brooklyn Superbas: 2× NL champion (1899, 1900)

Harry Von der Horst (c. 1850 – July 28, 1905) was an American executive in Major League Baseball and a former owner of the Baltimore Orioles and Brooklyn Superbas. He was one of the principal founders and owners of the old 19th century Baltimore Orioles ballclub and when the team was running out of steam he managed to engineer a merger with the Brooklyn team. This move enabled him to get a significant share of the team and exert enough influence to convince the Brooklyn ownership group to hire his manager, Ned Hanlon. He eventually sold his interest in the team, but remained as the club secretary until his death in 1905 at age 54 from heart failure.
