= Stephen McKeever =

American baseball executive (1853–1938)

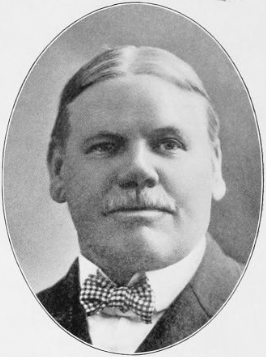
- Born: Stephen William McKeever; October 31, 1853; Brooklyn, New York, US
- Died: March 7, 1938 (aged 84); Brooklyn, New York, US
- Burial place: Holy Cross Cemetery
- Occupations: Construction contractor, baseball executive

Stephen William McKeever (October 31, 1853 – March 7, 1938) was a construction contractor and baseball executive in Brooklyn, New York in the early 1900s.

== Biography ==
Stephen McKeever was born in Brooklyn on October 31, 1853.

He and his brother Ed bought half of the Brooklyn Dodgers baseball team from Henry Medicus on January 2, 1912. Together with Charles Ebbets, who owned the other half of the team, they built Ebbets Field. When Ebbets died on April 18, 1925, Ed McKeever took over as team president. However, he caught a cold at Ebbets' funeral and died on April 29. Steve McKeever became the acting team president until Wilbert Robinson was elected team president on May 25, 1925. Steve McKeever was elected team president on October 12, 1932, and remained a 50% owner of the Dodgers until his death at his home in Brooklyn on March 7, 1938. He was buried in Holy Cross Cemetery in Brooklyn.

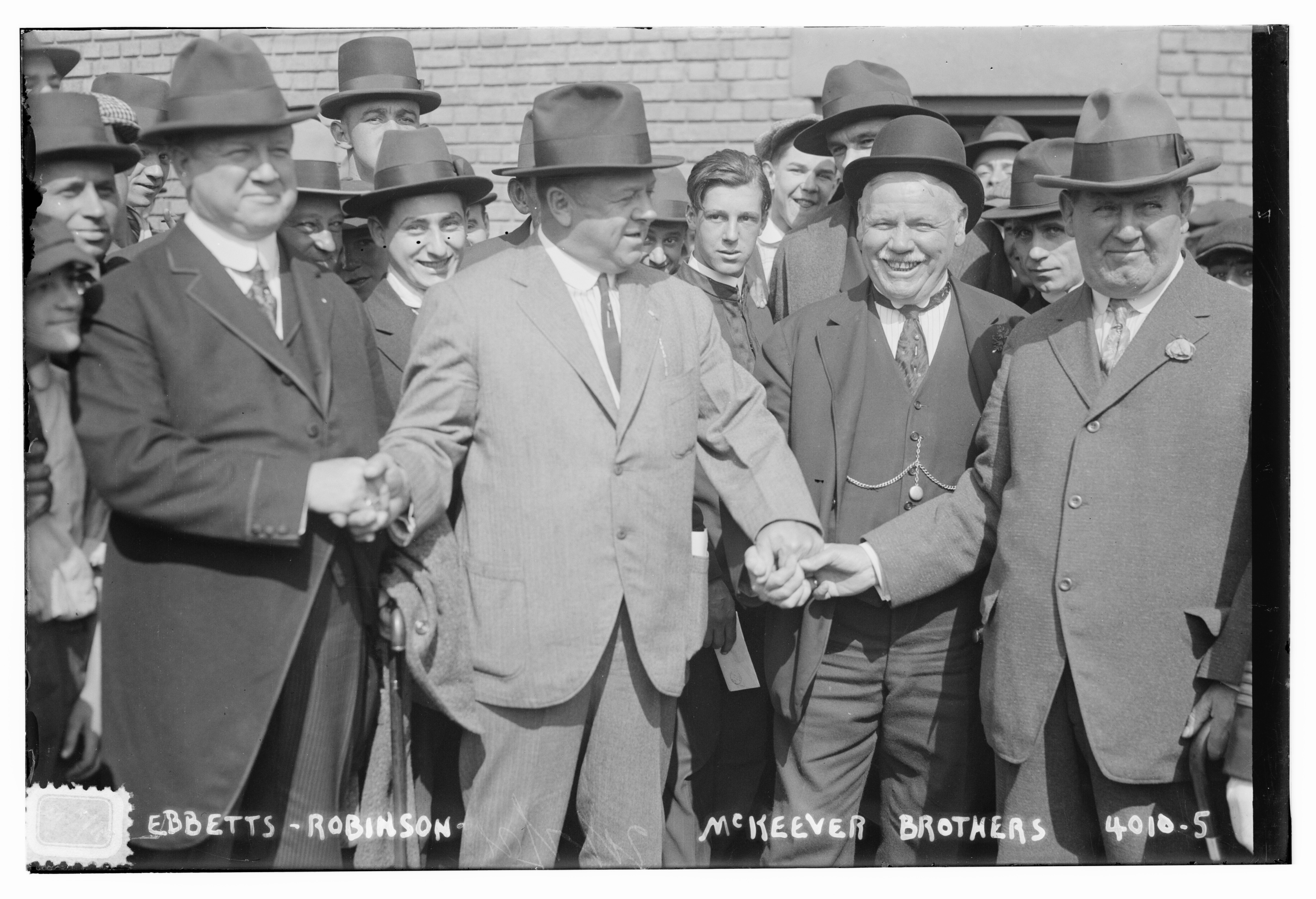
McKeever third from left in 1916

Preceded by Frank B. York	Brooklyn Dodgers President; 1932–1938	Succeeded by Larry MacPhail
