= Brooklyn Dodgers =

Baseball team in New York (1883–1957)

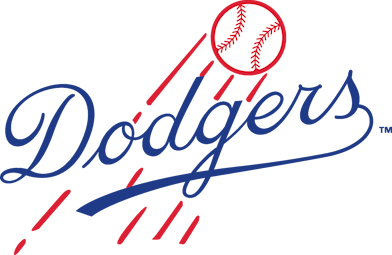

Logo	Cap insignia

Information
- League: National League (1890–1957)
- Ballpark: Ebbets Field (1913–1957)
- Established: 1883; 143 years ago
- Relocated: 1958; 68 years ago (to Los Angeles; became the Los Angeles Dodgers)
- Nickname: Dem Bums
- World Series championships: 1: 1955
- National League pennants: 12: 1890; 1899; 1900; 1916; 1920; 1941; 1947; 1949; 1952; 1953; 1955; 1956
- Chronicle-Telegraph Cup: 1: 1900
- Former name: Brooklyn Robins (1914–1931); Brooklyn Dodgers (1913); Brooklyn Trolley Dodgers (1911–1912); Brooklyn Superbas (1899–1910); Brooklyn Bridegrooms (1896–1898); Brooklyn Grooms (1891–1895); Brooklyn Bridegrooms (1888–1890); Brooklyn Grays (1885–1887); Brooklyn Atlantics (1884); Brooklyn Grays (1883)
- Former league: American Association (1884–1889)
- Former ballparks: Washington Park (II) (1898–1912); Eastern Park (1891–1897); Ridgewood Park (1886–1889) (Note: Sunday games only.); Washington Park (I) (1884–1890); Roosevelt Stadium (1956–1957, part-time)
- Colors: Dodger blue, white
- Retired numbers: 1; 4; 14; 19; 24; 39; 42
- Ownership: List of owners: Charlie Byrne (1883–1897); Ferdinand Abell (1883–1906); George Chauncey (1891–1897); Charles Ebbets (1897–1925); Harry Von der Horst (1899–1904); Ned Hanlon (1899–1906); Henry Medicus (1905–1912); Ed McKeever (1912–1925); Stephen McKeever (1912–1938); Grace Slade Ebbets (1925–1944); Joseph Gilleaudeau (1925–1944); Brooklyn Trust Company (1925–1944); Dearie Mulvey (1938–1957); James Mulvey (1938–1957); Branch Rickey (1945–1950); Walter O'Malley (1945–1957); John L. Smith (1945–1950); Mary Louise Smith (1950–1957)
- President: List of presidents: Charlie Byrne (1890–1897); Charles Ebbets (1898–1925); Ed McKeever (1925); Wilbert Robinson (1925–1930); Frank York (1930–1932); Stephen McKeever (1932–1938); Larry MacPhail (1938–1942); Branch Rickey (1942–1950); Walter O'Malley (1950–1957)
- General manager: List of general managers: Branch Rickey (1950); Buzzie Bavasi (1951–1957)
- Manager: List of managers: George Taylor (1884); Charlie Hackett (1885); Charlie Byrne (1885–1887); Bill McGunnigle (1888–1890); John Montgomery Ward (1891–1892); Dave Foutz (1893–1896); Billy Barnie (1897–1898); Mike Griffin (1898); Charles Ebbets (1898); Ned Hanlon (1899–1905); Patsy Donovan (1906–1908); Harry Lumley (1909); Bill Dahlen (1910–1913); Wilbert Robinson (1914–1931); Max Carey (1932–1933); Casey Stengel (1934–1936); Burleigh Grimes (1937–1938); Leo Durocher (1939–1946); Clyde Sukeforth (1947); Burt Shotton (1947); Leo Durocher (1948); Ray Blades (1948); Burt Shotton (1948–1950); Chuck Dressen (1951–1953); Walter Alston (1954–1976)

The Brooklyn Dodgers were a Major League Baseball team founded in 1883 as the Brooklyn Grays. In 1884, it became a member of the American Association as the Brooklyn Atlantics before joining the National League in 1890. They remained in Brooklyn, New York, until 1957, after which the team moved to Los Angeles, where it continues as the Los Angeles Dodgers. That same year, the Dodgers' longtime rival, the New York Giants, moved to San Francisco and became the San Francisco Giants.

The "Dodgers" team name is a shortened form of one of their former names, the Brooklyn Trolley Dodgers. "Trolley dodgers" is a nickname for Brooklyn residents who had to avoid being hit by the city's fast-moving trolleys while crossing their lines. The Dodgers later earned the respectful nickname Dem Bums. The Dodgers played in two stadiums in South Brooklyn, each named Washington Park, and at Eastern Park in the neighborhood of Brownsville before moving to Ebbets Field in the neighborhood of Crown Heights in 1912. The team is noted for signing Jackie Robinson in 1947 as the first black player in the modern major leagues.

The Brooklyn Dodgers had an overall win–loss record of 5,624–5,290–133 (.515) during their 68 years in Brooklyn. Eight former Brooklyn Dodgers players were elected to the National Baseball Hall of Fame.

== History ==
=== Early Brooklyn baseball ===
Many of the clubs represented at the first convention of the National Association of Base Ball Players (NABBP) were from Brooklyn, including the Atlantic, Eckford, and Excelsior clubs that combined to dominate play for most of the 1860s. Brooklyn helped make baseball commercial, as the locale of the first paid admission games, a series of three all star contests matching New York and Brooklyn in 1858. Brooklyn also featured the first two enclosed baseball grounds, the Union Grounds and the Capitoline Grounds; enclosed, dedicated ballparks accelerated the evolution from amateurism to professionalism.

Despite the early success of Brooklyn clubs in the NABBP, which were officially amateur until 1869, they fielded weak teams in the succeeding National Association of Professional Base Ball Players (NAPBBP), the first professional league formed in 1871. The Excelsiors no longer challenged for the amateur championship after the Civil War (1861–1865) and never entered the professional NAPBBP (aka NA). The Eckfords and Atlantics declined to join until 1872 and thereby lost their best players; the Eckfords survived only one season and the Atlantics four, with losing teams.

The National League (NL) replaced the NAPBBP in 1876 and granted exclusive territories to its eight members, excluding the Atlantics in favor of the Mutual Club of New York who had shared home grounds with the Atlantics. When the Mutuals were expelled by the league, the Hartford club moved in, the press dubbing them the Brooklyn Hartfords, and played its home games at Union Grounds in 1877 before disbanding.

=== Origin of the Dodgers ===
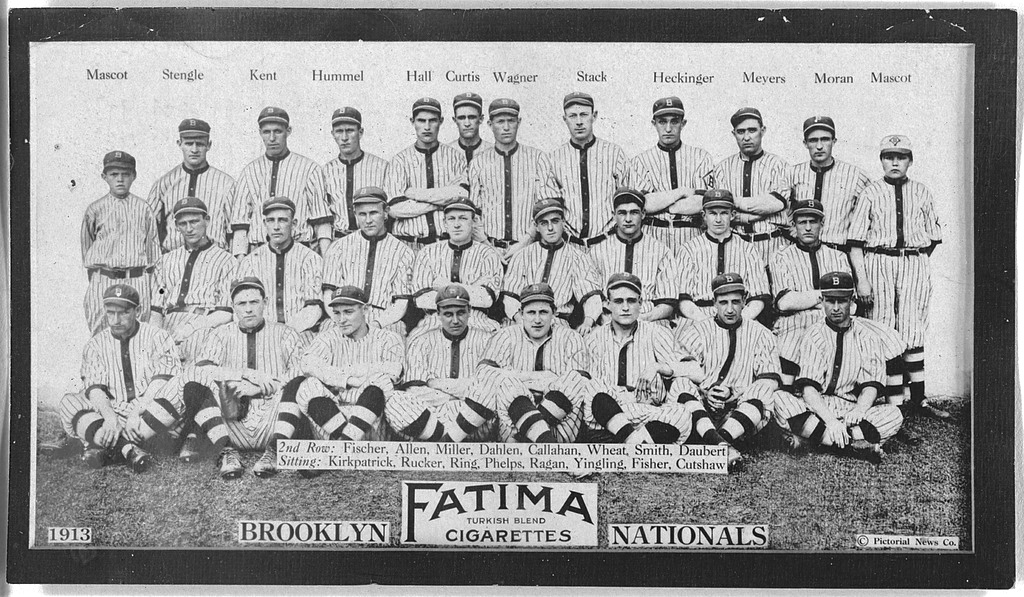
Photograph of the 1913 Brooklyn Dodgers team

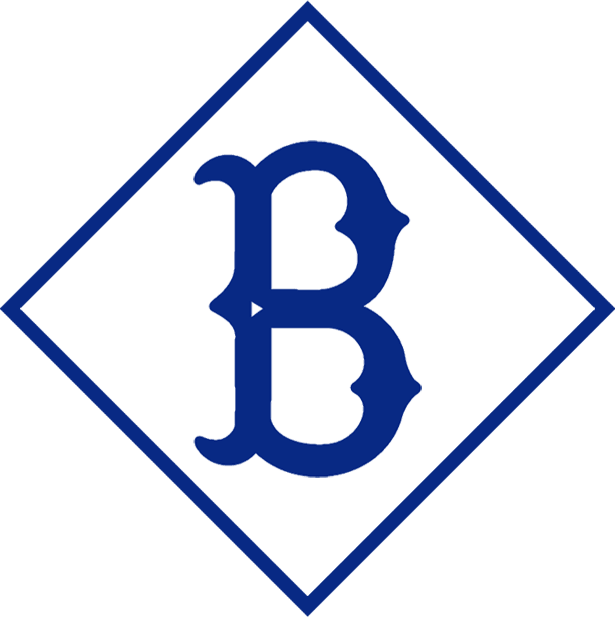
Brooklyn Dodgers logo 1910 to 1913

The team currently known as the Dodgers was formed in 1883 by real estate magnate and baseball enthusiast Charles Byrne, who convinced his brother-in-law Joseph Doyle and casino operator Ferdinand Abell to start the team with him. Byrne arranged to build a grandstand on a lot bounded by Third Street, Fourth Avenue, Fifth Street, and Fifth Avenue, and named it Washington Park in honor of first president George Washington.

Nicknamed by reporters the "Grays" for their uniforms, the team played in the minor league Inter-State Association of Professional Baseball Clubs that first season. Doyle became the first team manager, and they drew 6,431 fans to their first home game on May 12, 1883, against the Trenton, New Jersey, team. The Grays won the league title after the Camden Merritt club in New Jersey disbanded on July 20 and Brooklyn picked up some of its better players. The Grays were invited to join the two-year-old professional circuit, the American Association (founded 1882) to compete with the eight-year-old NL for the 1884 season.

After winning the American Association league championship in 1889, the Brooklyn club (very occasionally now nicknamed the Bridegrooms or Grooms, for six players having wed during the 1888 season) moved to the competing older National League (1876) and won the 1890 NL Championship, being the only Major League team to win consecutive championships in both professional "base ball" leagues. They lost the 1889 championship tournament to the New York Giants and tied the 1890 championship with Louisville. Their success during this period was partly attributed to their having absorbed skilled players from the defunct AA New York Metropolitans and one-year Players' League entry the Brooklyn Ward's Wonders. The middle years of the decade were disappointing, a slump the Spalding Guide rather primly ascribed to management tolerating drunkenness among the players.

Over the 1890s, Charles Ebbets accumulated shares in the club, owning 80% of it by decade's end. Other shares were held by Harry Von der Horst, owner of the Baltimore Orioles team that won consecutive championships in 1894, 1895, and 1896, and Orioles manager Ned Hanlon. In 1899, Von der Horst and Hanlon moved most of the Orioles' stars from Baltimore to join the Grays (Bridegrooms) in Brooklyn; Hanlon became the team's manager. The press, inspired by the popular circus act The Hanlons' Superba, dubbed the new combined team the Brooklyn Superbas. In 1899 and in 1900, they were the champions of the National League.

==== Nicknames ====
The name Brooklyn Trolley Dodgers was first used to describe the team in 1895. The nickname was still new enough in September 1895 that a newspaper reported that "'Trolley Dodgers' is the new name which eastern baseball cranks [fans] have given the Brooklyn club." In 1895, Brooklyn played at Eastern Park, bounded by Eastern Parkway (now Pitkin Avenue), Powell Street, Sutter Avenue, Van Sinderen Street, where they had moved early in the 1891 season, when the second Washington Park burned down.

Some sources erroneously report that the name "Trolley Dodgers" referred to pedestrians avoiding fast cars on street car tracks that bordered Eastern Park on two sides. However, Eastern Park was not bordered by street-level trolley lines that had to be "dodged" by pedestrians. The name "Trolley Dodgers" implied the dangers posed by trolley cars in Brooklyn generally, which in 1892, began the switch from horse-power to electrical power, which made them much faster, and were hence regarded as more dangerous. The name was later shortened to Brooklyn Dodgers.

Other team names used to refer to the franchise that finally came to be called "the Dodgers" were the Atlantics (1884, not directly related to the earlier Brooklyn Atlantics), Bridegrooms or Grooms (1888–1898), Ward's Wonders, the Superbas (1899–1910), and the Robins (1914–1931), named for longtime manager Wilbert Robinson. All of these nicknames were used by fans and newspaper sportswriters to describe the team, often concurrently, but not in any official capacity. The team's legal name was the Brooklyn Base Ball Club.

The "Trolley Dodgers" nickname was used throughout this period, along with other nicknames, by fans and sports writers of the day. The team did not use the name in a formal sense until 1916, when the name was printed on home World Series programs. The word "Dodgers" appeared on team jerseys in 1932. The "conclusive shift" came in 1933, when both home and road jerseys for the team bore the name "Dodgers".

Examples of how the many popularized names of the team were used interchangeably are available from newspaper articles from the period before 1932. A New York Times article describing a game the Dodgers played in 1916 starts out by referring to how "Jimmy Callahan, pilot of the Pirates, did his best to wreck the hopes the Dodgers have of gaining the National League pennant", but then goes on to comment, "the only thing that saved the Superbas from being toppled from first place was that the Phillies lost one of the two games played."

Most baseball statistics sites and baseball historians generally now refer to the pennant-winning 1916 Brooklyn team as the Robins; on the other hand, the Brooklyn Daily Eagle used "Superbas" in its box scores that season. A 1918 New York Times article used the nickname Robins in its title "Buccaneers Take Last From Robins", but the subtitle of the article reads "Subdue The Superbas By 11 To 4, Making Series An Even Break". Space-conscious headline writers still used "the Flock" (derived from "Robins") during the Dodgers' last decade in Brooklyn.

Another example of the interchangeability of different nicknames is found on the program issued at Ebbets Field for the 1920 World Series, which identifies the matchup in the series as "Dodgers vs. Indians", despite the fact that the Robins nickname had been in consistent usage at this point for around six years.

=== Breaking the color barrier ===
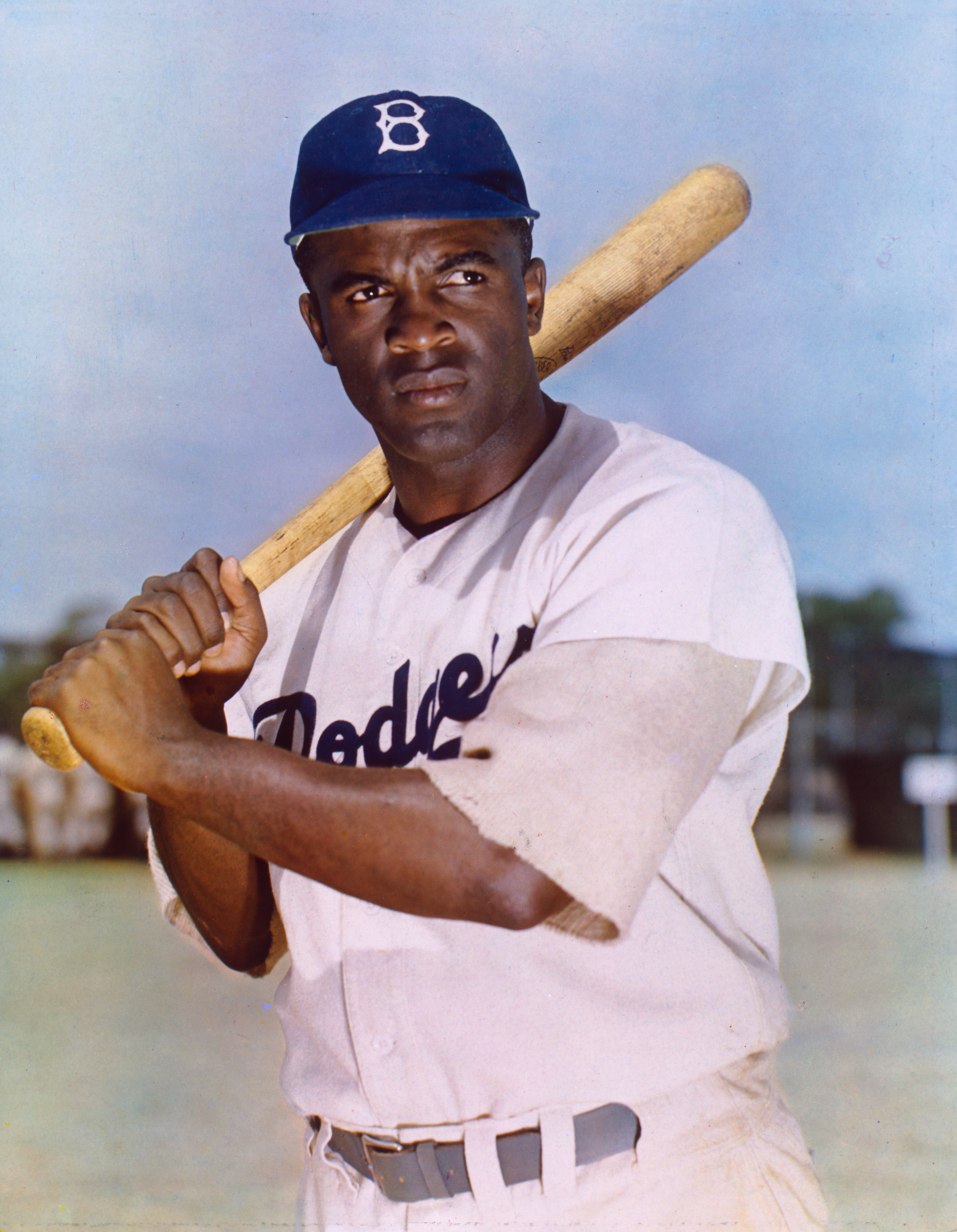
Jackie Robinson with the Dodgers in 1949

For most of the first half of the 20th century, no Major League Baseball team employed a black player. A parallel system of Negro leagues developed, but most Negro league players were denied a chance to prove their skill before a wider national audience. Jackie Robinson became the first African-American to play in MLB in the 20th century when he played his first NL game on April 15, 1947 for the Dodgers. Robinson's entry into the league was mainly due to general manager Branch Rickey's efforts.

The deeply religious Rickey's motivation appears to have been primarily moral, although business considerations were also present. Rickey was a member of the Methodist Church, the antecedent denomination to the United Methodist Church of today, which was a strong advocate for social justice and active later in the Civil Rights Movement. Rickey saw his opportunity with the 1944 death of Commissioner Kenesaw Mountain Landis, an arch-segregationist and enforcer of the color barrier.

Besides selecting Robinson for his exceptional baseball skills, Rickey also considered Robinson's outstanding personal character, his UCLA education and rank of captain in the U.S. Army in his decision, since he knew that boos, taunts, and criticism were going to be directed at Robinson, and that Robinson had to be tough enough to withstand abuse without attempting to retaliate.

The inclusion of Robinson on the team also led the Dodgers to move its spring training site. Prior to 1946, the Dodgers held their spring training in Jacksonville, Florida. However, the city's stadium refused to host an exhibition game with the Montreal Royals, the Dodgers' own farm club, on whose roster Robinson appeared at the time, citing segregation laws. Nearby Sanford similarly declined. Ultimately, City Island Ballpark in Daytona Beach agreed to host the game with Robinson on the field. The team traveled to Havana, Cuba for spring training in 1947, this time with Robinson on the big club. Although the Dodgers ultimately built Dodgertown and its Holman Stadium further south in Vero Beach, and played there for 61 spring training seasons from 1948 through 2008, Daytona Beach renamed City Island Ballpark to Jackie Robinson Ballpark in his honor.

This event marked the continuation of the integration of professional sports in the United States, with professional football having led the way in 1946, with the concomitant demise of the Negro leagues, and is regarded as a key moment in the history of the American civil rights movement. Robinson was an exceptional player, a speedy runner who sparked the team with his intensity. He was the inaugural recipient of the Rookie of the Year award, which is now named the Jackie Robinson award in his honor. The Dodgers' willingness to integrate, when most other teams refused to, was a key factor in their 1947–1956 success. They won six pennants in those 10 years with the help of Robinson, three-time MVP Roy Campanella, Cy Young Award winner Don Newcombe, Jim Gilliam, and Joe Black. Robinson eventually became the first African-American elected to the Baseball Hall of Fame in 1962.

=== "Wait 'til next year!" ===
Cap logo introduced in 1949 and worn exclusively in 1956 & 1957.

After the wilderness years of the 1920s and 1930s, the Dodgers were rebuilt into a contending club first by general manager Larry MacPhail and then the legendary Branch Rickey. Led by Jackie Robinson, Pee Wee Reese, and Gil Hodges in the infield, Duke Snider and Carl Furillo in the outfield, Roy Campanella behind the plate, and Don Newcombe, Carl Erskine, and Preacher Roe on the mound, the Dodgers won pennants in 1941, 1947, 1949, 1952, and 1953, only to fall to the New York Yankees in all five of the subsequent World Series. The annual ritual of building excitement, followed in the end by disappointment, became a common pattern to the long suffering fans, and "Wait 'til next year!" became an unofficial Dodger slogan.

While the Dodgers generally enjoyed success during this period, in 1951 they fell victim to one of the largest collapses in the history of baseball. On August 11, 1951, Brooklyn led the National League by an enormous 13 1/2 games over their archrivals, the Giants. While the Dodgers went 26–22 from that time until the end of the season, the Giants went on to win 37 of their last 44 games, including their last seven in a row. At the end of the season the Dodgers and the Giants were tied for first place, forcing a three-game playoff for the pennant.

The Giants took Game 1 by a score of 3–1 before being shut out by the Dodgers' Clem Labine in Game 2, 10–0. Brooklyn held a 4–2 lead in the bottom of the ninth inning of Game 3. Giants outfielder Bobby Thomson, however, hit a stunning three-run walk-off home run off the Dodgers' Ralph Branca to secure the NL Championship for the Giants. Thomson's home run is known as the Shot Heard 'Round The World.

In 1955, by which time the core of the Dodger team was beginning to age, "next year" finally came. The fabled "Boys of Summer" shot down the "Bronx Bombers" in seven games, led by the first-class pitching of young left-hander Johnny Podres, whose key pitch was a changeup known as "pulling down the lampshade" because of the arm motion used right when the ball was released. Podres won two Series games, including the deciding seventh. The turning point of Game 7 was a spectacular double play that began with left fielder Sandy Amorós running down Yogi Berra's long fly ball, then throwing to shortstop Pee Wee Reese, who relayed to first baseman Gil Hodges to double up a surprised Gil McDougald to preserve the Dodger lead. Hank Bauer grounded out and the Dodgers won 2–0.

Although the Dodgers lost the World Series to the Yankees in 1956, during which the Yankees pitcher Don Larsen pitched the only World Series perfect game in baseball history and the only post-season no-hitter for the next 54 years, it hardly seemed to matter. Brooklyn fans had their memory of triumph, and soon that was all they were left with, a victory that was remembered decades later in the Billy Joel single "We Didn't Start the Fire", which included the line, "Brooklyn's got a winning team."

=== Move to California ===
Lawyer and real estate businessman Walter O'Malley had acquired majority ownership of the Dodgers in 1950, when he bought Rickey's 25 percent share of the team and secured the support of the widow of another equal partner, John L. Smith. Soon O'Malley was working to buy new land in Brooklyn for a new, more accessible and better ballpark than Ebbets Field. Beloved as it was, Ebbets Field had grown old and was not well served by vehicular infrastructure, to the point where the Dodgers could not "sell out" the park to maximum capacity even in the heat of a pennant race, despite dominating the league from 1946 to 1957.

New York City Construction Coordinator Robert Moses sought to force O'Malley into using a site in Flushing Meadows, Queens – the eventual location of Shea Stadium (which opened in 1964), the home of the future New York Mets, who began play in 1962. Moses' vision involved a city-built, city-owned park, which was greatly at odds with O'Malley's real-estate savvy. When O'Malley realized that he was not going to be allowed to buy a suitable parcel of land in Brooklyn, he began thinking of moving the team.

O'Malley was free to purchase land of his own choosing but wanted Moses to condemn a parcel of land along the Atlantic Railroad Yards in downtown Brooklyn under Title I authority, after O'Malley had bought the bulk of the land he had in mind. Title I gave the city power to condemn land for the purpose of building what it calls "public purpose" projects. Moses' interpretation of "public purpose" included public parks, housing, highways, and bridges.

What O'Malley wanted was for Moses to use Title I authority, rather than to pay market value for the land. With Title I the city via Robert Moses could have sold the land to O'Malley at a below market price. Moses refused to honor O'Malley's request and responded, "If you want the land so bad, why don't you purchase it with your own money?"

Meanwhile, non-stop transcontinental airline travel had become routine during the years since World War II. Teams were no longer bound by much slower railroad infrastructure. Because of advances in civil aviation, it became possible to locate teams farther apart, as far west as California, while maintaining the same game schedules.

When Los Angeles officials attended the 1956 World Series looking to entice a team to move there, they were not even thinking of the Dodgers. Their original target had been the Washington Senators franchise, which eventually moved to Bloomington, Minnesota, to become the Minnesota Twins in 1961. At the same time, O'Malley was looking for a contingency in case Moses and other New York politicians refused to let him build the Brooklyn stadium he wanted and sent word to the Los Angeles officials that he was interested in talking. Los Angeles offered him what New York did not: a chance to buy land somewhat suitable for building a ballpark and the chance to own that ballpark, giving him complete control over all its revenue streams. At the same time, the National League was not willing to approve the Dodgers' move unless O'Malley found a second team willing to join them out west, largely out of concern for travel costs.

Meanwhile, Giants owner Horace Stoneham was having similar difficulty finding a replacement for his team's antiquated home stadium, the Polo Grounds. Unlike O'Malley, Stoneham did not engage in a serious effort to identify a location for a replacement for the Polo Grounds. Stoneham was considering moving the Giants to Minneapolis but was persuaded instead to move them to San Francisco, ensuring that the Dodgers had a National League rival closer than St. Louis. So, the two arch-rival teams, the Dodgers and Giants, moved out to the West Coast together after the 1957 season.

The Brooklyn Dodgers played their final game at Ebbets Field on September 24, 1957, which the Dodgers won 2–0 over the Pittsburgh Pirates.

On April 18, 1958, the Los Angeles Dodgers played their first game in L.A., defeating the former New York and newly moved and renamed San Francisco Giants, 6–5, before 78,672 fans at the Los Angeles Memorial Coliseum. Catcher Roy Campanella, left partially paralyzed in an off-season automobile accident on January 28, 1958, never played for the Dodgers in Los Angeles.

== Legacy ==
After the 1957 season, the Brooklyn Dodgers and New York Giants relocated from New York to California to become the Los Angeles Dodgers and San Francisco Giants, leaving the largest city in the United States with no National League franchise and only one major league team, the New York Yankees of the American League (AL). With the threat of a New York team joining the new Continental League, the National League expanded by adding the New York Mets following a proposal from William Shea. In a symbolic reference to New York's earlier National League teams, the new team took as its primary colors the blue of the Dodgers and the orange of the Giants, both of which are colors also featured on the flag of New York City. The nickname "Mets" was adopted: being a natural shorthand to the club's corporate name, the "New York Metropolitan Baseball Club, Inc.", which hearkened back to the "Metropolitans" (a New York team in the American Association from 1880 to 1887), and its brevity was advantageous for newspaper headlines.

== Other historical notes ==
=== Historical records and firsts ===
- First baseball team to win championships in different leagues in consecutive years (1889–1890)
- First television broadcast (1939)
- First use of batting helmets (1941)
- First MLB team to employ and start an African-American player in the 20th century (Jackie Robinson, 1947)
- First MLB team to have numbers on the front of their uniforms (1952)

== Rivalries ==
=== New York Giants ===
The historic and heated rivalry between the Dodgers and the Giants is more than a century old. It began when the Dodgers and Giants faced each other in the 1889 World Series, the ancestor of the Subway Series, and both played in separate, neighboring cities. Brooklyn and New York were separate cities until 1898, when they became neighboring boroughs of the newly consolidated New York City. When both franchises moved to California after the 1957 season, the rivalry was easily transplanted, as the cities of Los Angeles and San Francisco have long been economic, political, and cultural rivals, representative of the broader Southern/Northern California divide.

==== "Uncle Robbie" and the "Daffiness Boys" ====
Manager Wilbert Robinson, another former Oriole, popularly known as "Uncle Robbie", restored the Brooklyn team to respectability. His "Brooklyn Robins" reached the 1916 and 1920 World Series, losing both, but contending perennially for several seasons. Charles Ebbets and Ed McKeever died within a week of each other in 1925, and Robbie was named president while still field manager. Upon assuming the title of president, however, Robinson's ability to focus on the field declined, and the teams of the late 1920s were often fondly referred to as the "Daffiness Boys" for their distracted, error-ridden style of play.

Outfielder Babe Herman was the leader both in hitting and in zaniness. The signature Dodger play from this era occurred when three players, Dazzy Vance, Chick Fewster, and Herman, ended up at third base at the same time. The play is often remembered as Herman "tripling into a triple play", though only two of the three players were declared out and Herman was credited with a double rather than a triple. Herman later complained that no one remembered that he drove in the winning run on the play. The incident led to the popular joke:

- "The Dodgers have three men on base!"
- "Oh, yeah? Which base?"

After his removal as club president, Robinson returned to managing, and the club's performance rebounded somewhat.

When Robinson retired in 1931, he was replaced as manager by Max Carey, who had played for the team from 1926 until 1929. Although some suggested renaming the "Robins" the "Brooklyn Canaries", after Carey, whose last name was originally "Carnarius", the name "Brooklyn Dodgers" returned to stay following Robinson's retirement. It was during this era that Willard Mullin, a noted sports cartoonist, fixed the Brooklyn team with the lovable nickname of "Dem Bums". After hearing his cab driver ask, "So how did those bums do today?", Mullin decided to sketch an exaggerated version of famed circus clown Emmett Kelly to represent the Dodgers in his much-praised cartoons in the New York World-Telegram. Both image and nickname caught on, so much so that many a Dodger yearbook cover, from 1951 through 1957, featured a Willard Mullin illustration of the Brooklyn Bum.

Perhaps the highlight of the Daffiness Boys era came after Wilbert Robinson left the dugout. In 1934, Giants player/manager Bill Terry was asked about the Dodgers' chances in the coming pennant race and cracked infamously, "Is Brooklyn still in the league?" Managed then by Casey Stengel, who played for the Dodgers in the 1910s and went on to greatness managing the New York Yankees, the 1934 Dodgers were determined to make their presence felt. As it happened, the season entered its final games with the Giants tied with the St. Louis Cardinals for the pennant, with the Giants' remaining games against the Dodgers. Stengel led his Bums to the Polo Grounds for the showdown, and they beat the Giants twice to knock them out of the pennant race. The "Gashouse Gang" Cardinals nailed the pennant by beating the Cincinnati Reds those same two days.

One key development during this era was the 1938 appointment of Leland "Larry" MacPhail as Dodgers' general manager. MacPhail, who brought night games to Major League Baseball as general manager of the Reds, also started night baseball in Brooklyn and ordered the successful refurbishing of Ebbets Field. He also brought Reds voice Red Barber to Brooklyn as the Dodgers' lead announcer in 1939, just after MacPhail broke the New York baseball executives' agreement to ban live baseball broadcasts, enacted because of the fear of the effect of radio calls on the home teams' attendance.

MacPhail remained with the Dodgers until 1942, when he returned to the Armed Forces for World War II. He later became one of the Yankees' co-owners, bidding unsuccessfully for Barber to join him in the Bronx as announcer.

The first major-league baseball game to be televised was Brooklyn's 6–1 victory over Cincinnati at Ebbets Field on August 26, 1939. Batting helmets were introduced to Major League Baseball by the Dodgers in 1941.

=== New York Yankees ===
The Dodgers met the Yankees, another New York team, seven times in the World Series, more than any other two teams from the American and National Leagues before 1958. The Yankees are 6–1 against the Brooklyn Dodgers in the World Series, with the Dodgers winning their first and only World Series title against the Yankees, four games to three, in 1955.

After the Dodgers moved to Los Angeles in 1958, the rivalry continued as the teams met five more times in the World Series and represented two of the largest cities on each coast of the United States. Since 1958, the Dodgers have improved their record against the Yankees in the World Series; they are currently leading 3–2. Fan support has added to the notoriety of the series as both teams are supported by two of the largest fanbases in North America.

Although the rivalry's significance arose from the two teams' numerous World Series meetings, the Yankees and Dodgers did not meet in the World Series between 1981 and 2024. They did not play each other again in a non-exhibition game until 2004, when they played a three-game interleague series. Nevertheless, games between the two teams have drawn sellout crowds.

=== St. Louis Cardinals ===
The Cardinals–Dodgers rivalry was particularly intense from 1941 through 1949. In his autobiography written in 1948, Leo Durocher, who managed the Dodgers for most of the 1940s, described the Cardinals as being "our old rivals." During this period, the Cardinals won the National League pennant 4 times (with the Dodgers finishing 2nd twice) and the Dodgers won the National League pennant 3 times (with the Cardinals finishing 2nd each time). In 1942 the Cardinals overcame a 10 game Dodger lead in early August to win the pennant. In 1946 the Cardinals and Dodgers finished the regular season tied for first place but the Cardinals won the pennant when they prevailed in the first ever playoff tiebreaker in the National League. Cardinal Hall of Famer Enos Slaughter said during this period of the Cardinals–Dodgers rivalry that "We loved to hate them and they loved to hate us."

During this period, after the 1942 season, Branch Rickey, who had built up the Cardinals farm system as their general manager moved to become the Dodgers' general manager. In 1947, after Rickey broke the color line by signing Jackie Robinson to the Dodgers, there were rumors that southerners playing for the Cardinals were planning to boycott games against the Dodgers, although the players later denied it. In general, the Cardinals were latecomers to integration. Front-office executive Bing Devine said the owner from 1947 to 1953, Fred Saigh, refused to sign black players. There was a widespread belief that St. Louis was, in many ways, a Southern city. In the mid-1950s many of its stores and restaurants refused to serve black customers. The Cardinals, with baseball's largest radio network blanketing the Midwest and South, had cultivated white Southern fans. Their ballpark was also the last in the majors to abolish segregated seating. Because of their lack of black players, the Cardinals play suffered on the field tremendously in the 1950s. Meanwhile, with the success of Robinson, the Dodgers doubled down on the opportunity to sign players of color from the Negro leagues. In the subsequent years after their pennant-winning season in 1947, they would sign Don Newcombe, Roy Campanella, and Jim Gilliam from the Negro leagues, adding to an already tremendous team. The Dodgers made the World Series in 1949, 1952, 1953, 1955, and 1956 (winning championships in 1955) and were a historic pennant race away from making it in 1951, in part because they were the first to accept African American players. The 1951 season included a 14-game winning streak for the Dodgers against the Cardinals, the longest such streak in the rivalry.

== Achievements ==
=== Baseball Hall of Famers ===
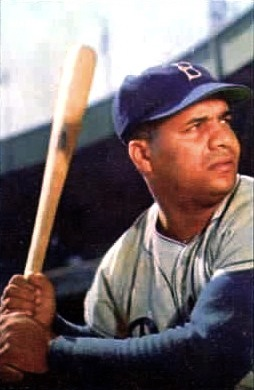
Hall of Fame C Roy Campanella (1948–1957)

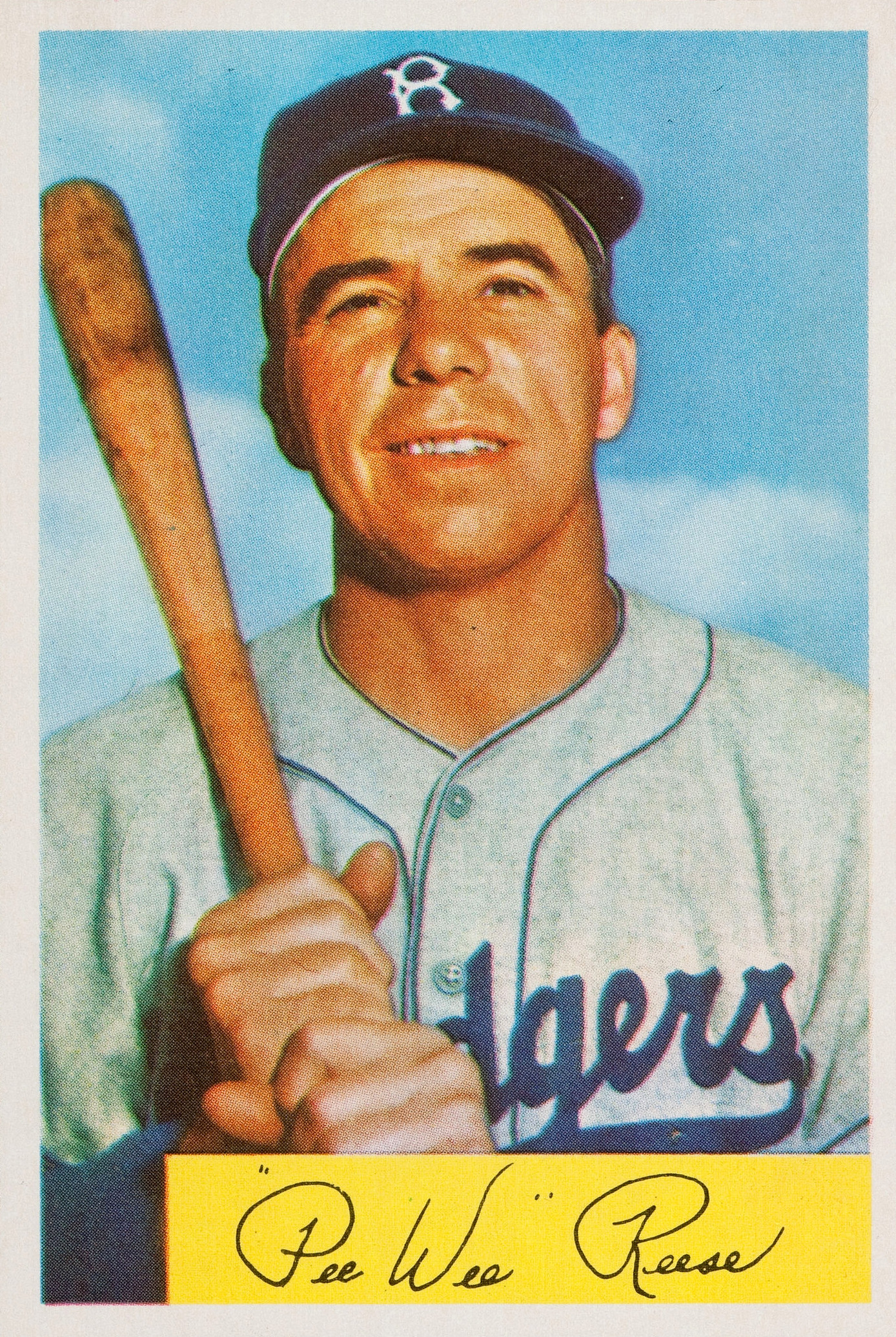
Hall of Fame SS Pee Wee Reese (1940–1942, 1946–1957)

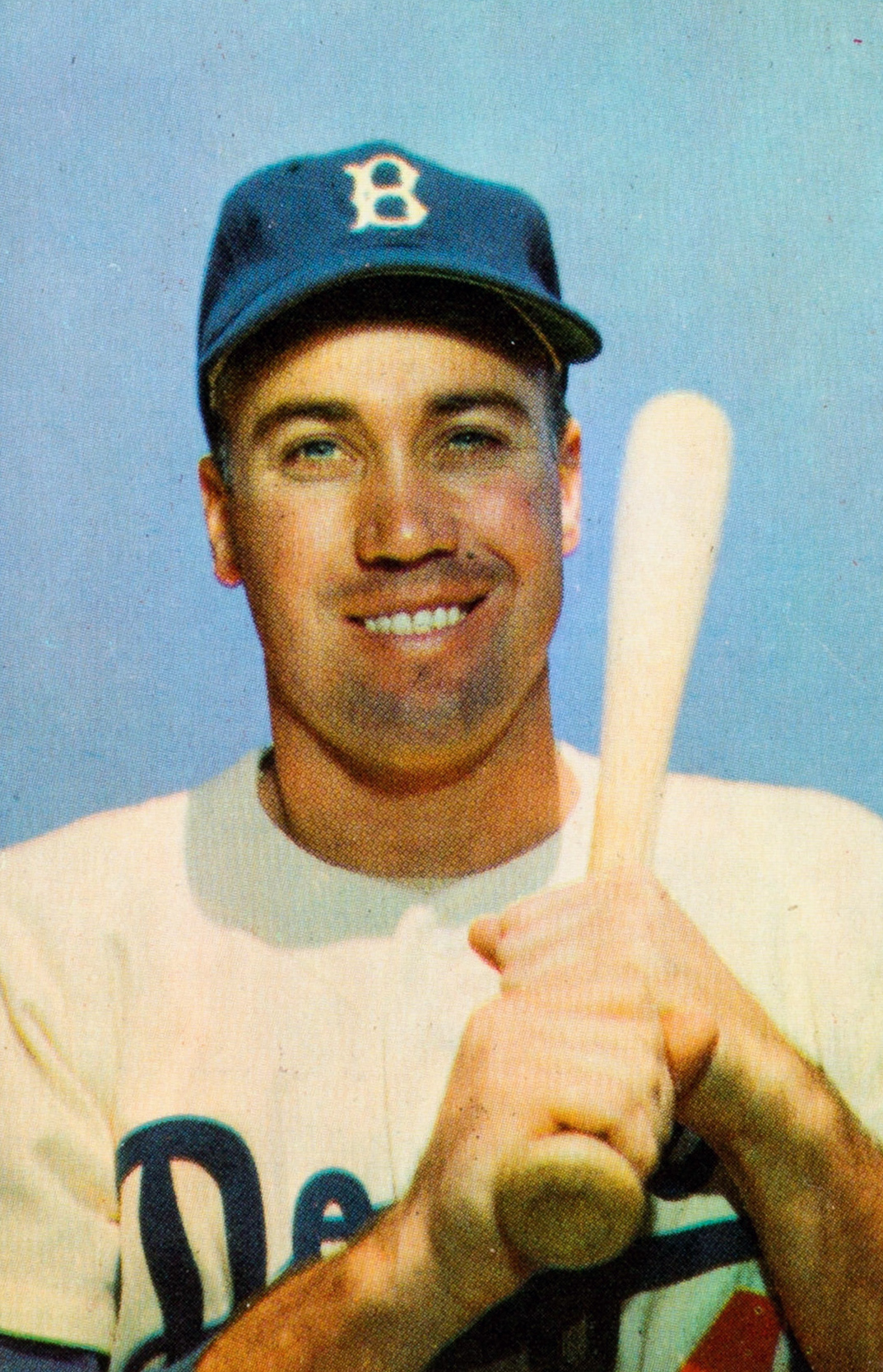
Hall of Fame OF Duke Snider (1947–1957), a native of Compton, California

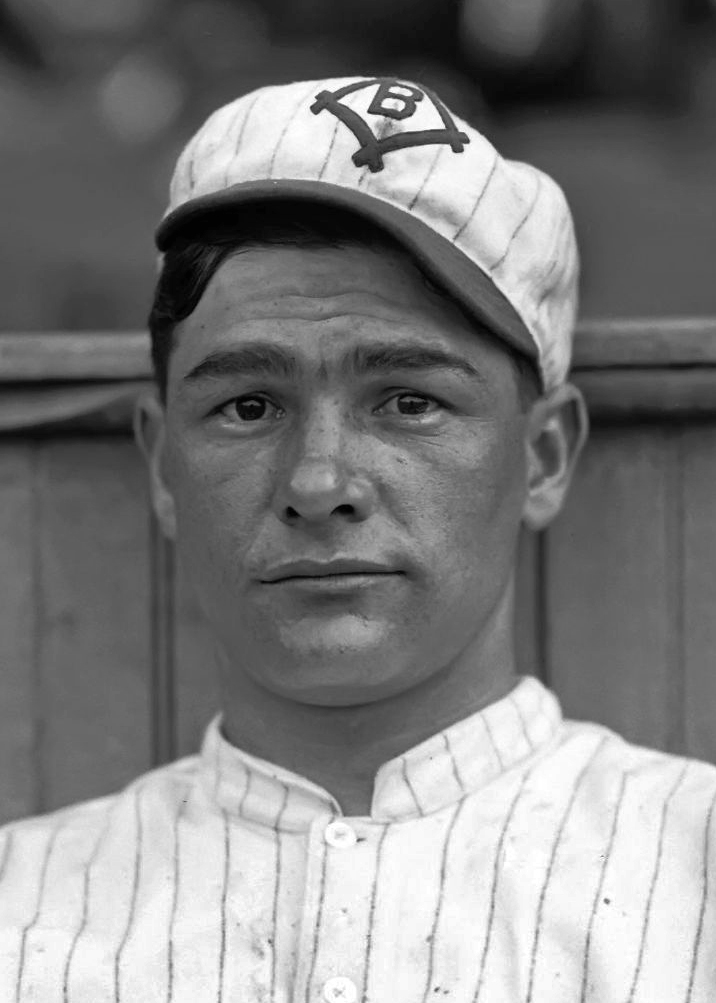
Hall of Fame OF Zack Wheat (1909–1926)

Brooklyn Dodgers Hall of Famers
Affiliation according to the National Baseball Hall of Fame and Museum
Brooklyn Grooms/Superbas/Robins/Dodgers

Dave Bancroft
Dan Brouthers
**Roy Campanella**
Max Carey^{1}
Kiki Cuyler
**Leo Durocher**^{2}
**Burleigh Grimes**^{1}

Ned Hanlon
Billy Herman
**Gil Hodges**
Waite Hoyt
Hughie Jennings
**Willie Keeler**
Joe Kelley
George Kelly

Tony Lazzeri
Freddie Lindstrom
Ernie Lombardi
Al López
Heinie Manush
Rabbit Maranville
Rube Marquard

Tommy McCarthy
Joe McGinnity
Joe Medwick
**Pee Wee Reese**
**Jackie Robinson**
**Wilbert Robinson**^{†}
**Duke Snider**
Casey Stengel^{2}

**Dazzy Vance**
Arky Vaughan
Lloyd Waner
Paul Waner
John Montgomery Ward^{1}
**Zack Wheat**
Hack Wilson

- Players and managers listed in **bold** are depicted on their Hall of Fame plaques wearing a Dodgers, Robins, Superbas, Grooms, or Bridegrooms cap insignia.
- ^{†} – depicted on Hall of Fame plaque without a cap or cap insignia due to not wearing a cap or playing when caps had no insignia; Hall of Fame recognizes Brooklyn/Los Angeles as "Primary Team"
- ^{1} – inducted as player, also managed Dodgers or was player-manager
- ^{2} – inducted as manager, also played for Dodgers or was player-manager

=== Team captains ===
- Leo Durocher 1938–1941
- Pee Wee Reese 1950–1957

=== Retired numbers ===
The Dodgers have retired seven numbers in the history of the franchise related to its tenure in Brooklyn. The following are of those whose contributions to the Dodgers took place either entirely or significantly in Brooklyn.

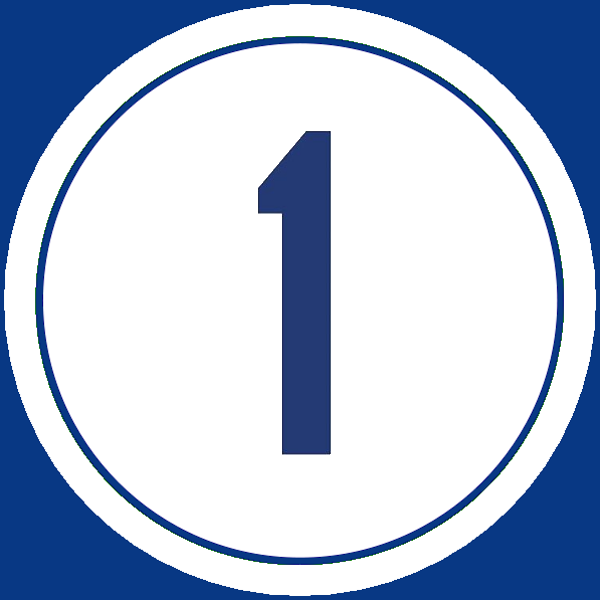
Pee Wee
Reese
SS
Coach
Retired July 1, 1984
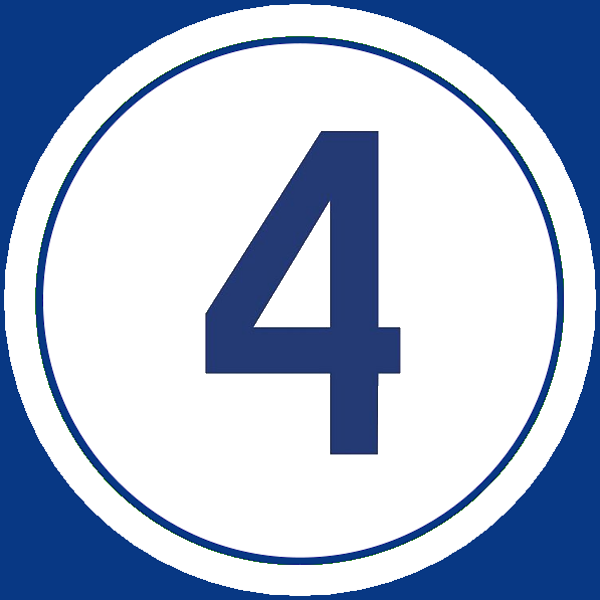
Duke
Snider
CF

Retired July 6, 1980
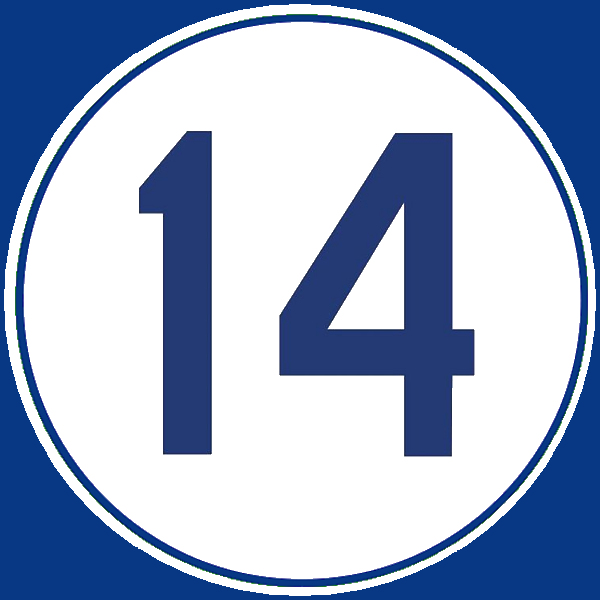
Gil
Hodges
1B

Retired June 4, 2022
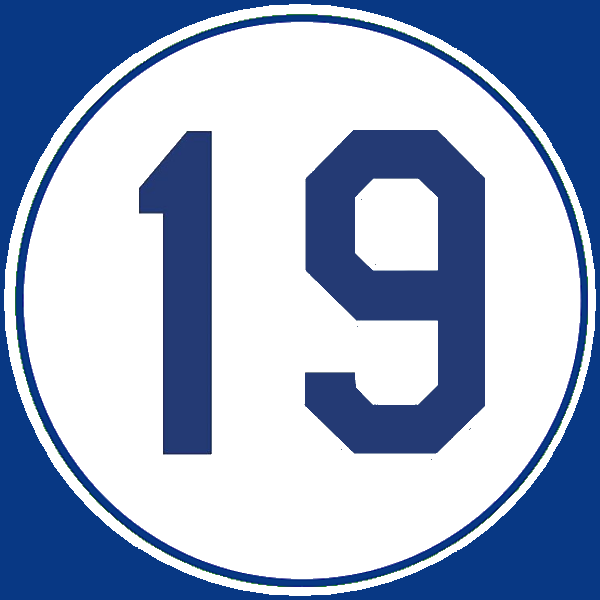
Jim
Gilliam
2B, 3B
Coach
Retired October 10, 1978
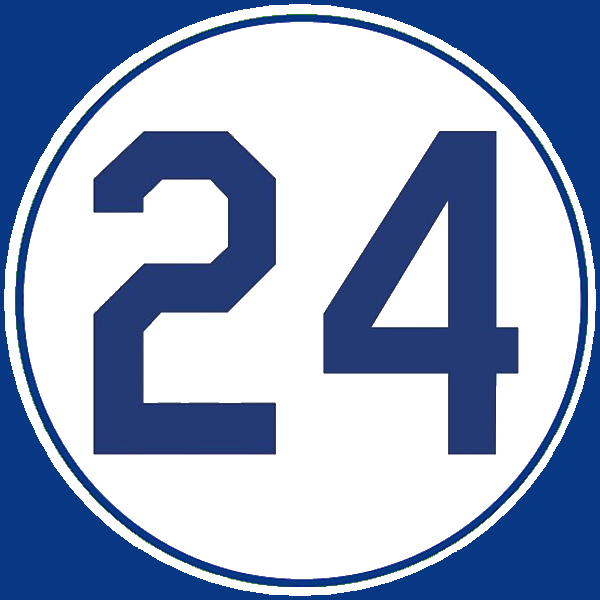
Walter
Alston
Mgr

Retired June 5, 1977
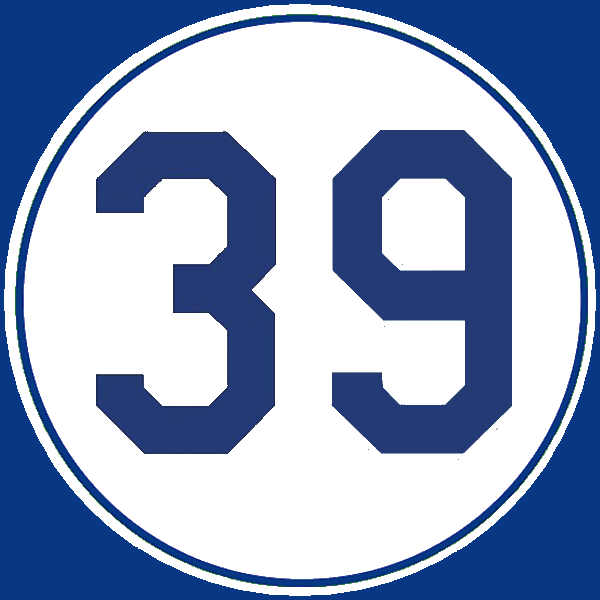
Roy
Campanella
C

Retired June 4, 1972
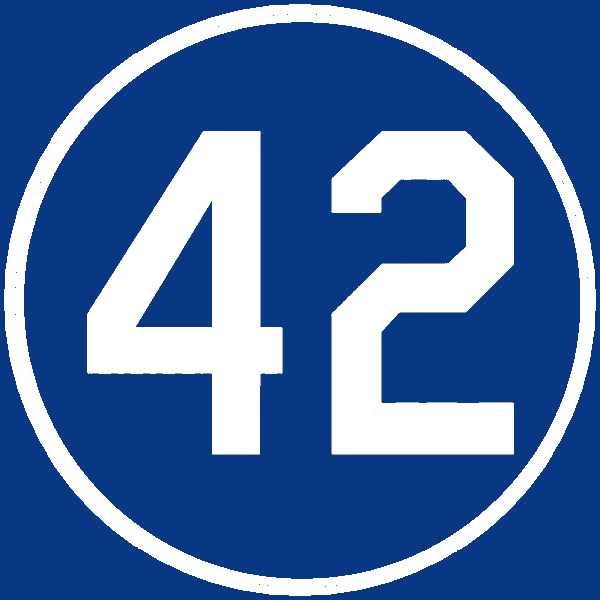
Jackie
Robinson
2B

Retired June 4, 1972

In 1997, 50 years after he broke the color barrier and 25 years after the Dodgers retired his number, Robinson's No. 42 was retired throughout Major League Baseball. Robinson is the only major league baseball player so honored. Starting in the 2007 season, Jackie Robinson Day (April 15, commemorating the Opening Day of Robinson's rookie season of 1947) has featured many or all players and coaches wearing the number 42 as a tribute to Robinson.

=== Legends of Dodger Baseball ===
In 2019, the Dodgers established "Legends of Dodger Baseball", which is meant to honor Dodger greats whose numbers have not been retired. The program honors those who made an "impact on the franchise, both on and off the field." Recipients are recognized with plaques at Dodger Stadium. Of these players, only one was primarily a Brooklyn Dodgers.

- Don Newcombe (2019)

=== Awards ===
==== Most Valuable Player (NL) ====
- 1913 – Jake Daubert
- 1924 – Dazzy Vance
- 1941 – Dolph Camilli
- 1949 – Jackie Robinson
- 1951 – Roy Campanella
- 1953 – Roy Campanella
- 1955 – Roy Campanella
- 1956 – Don Newcombe

==== World Series Most Valuable Player ====
- 1955 – Johnny Podres

==== Cy Young Award (NL) ====
- 1956 – Don Newcombe (MLB)

==== Triple Crown ====
- 1924 – Dazzy Vance

==== Rookie of the Year Award (NL) ====
- 1947 – Jackie Robinson (MLB)
- 1949 – Don Newcombe
- 1952 – Joe Black
- 1953 – Jim Gilliam

== Popular culture ==
A 2007 HBO film, Brooklyn Dodgers: The Ghosts of Flatbush, is a documentary covering the Dodgers history from early days to the beginning of the Los Angeles era. In the film, the story is related that O'Malley was so hated by Brooklyn Dodger fans after the move to California, that it was said: "If you asked a Brooklyn Dodger fan, if you had a gun with only two bullets in it and were in a room with Hitler, Stalin, and O'Malley, who would you shoot? The answer: O'Malley, twice!"

== Notes ==
Awards and achievements
Preceded by New York Giants; 1954	World Series champions Brooklyn Dodgers; 1955	Succeeded by New York Yankees; 1956
Preceded by New York Giants; 1888–1889	National League champions Brooklyn Bridegrooms; 1890	Succeeded by Boston Beaneaters; 1891
Preceded by Boston Beaneaters; 1897–1898	National League champions Brooklyn Superbas; 1899–1900	Succeeded by Pittsburgh Pirates; 1901–1903
Preceded by Philadelphia Phillies; 1915	National League champions Brooklyn Robins; 1916	Succeeded by New York Giants; 1917
Preceded by Cincinnati Reds; 1919	National League champions Brooklyn Robins; 1920	Succeeded by New York Giants; 1921–1924
Preceded by Cincinnati Reds; 1939–1940	National League champions Brooklyn Dodgers; 1941	Succeeded by St. Louis Cardinals; 1942–1944
Preceded by St. Louis Cardinals; 1946	National League champions Brooklyn Dodgers; 1947	Succeeded by Boston Braves; 1948
Preceded by Boston Braves; 1948	National League champions Brooklyn Dodgers; 1949	Succeeded by Philadelphia Phillies; 1950
Preceded by New York Giants; 1951	National League champions Brooklyn Dodgers; 1952–1953	Succeeded by New York Giants; 1954
Preceded by New York Giants; 1954	National League champions Brooklyn Dodgers; 1955–1956	Succeeded by Milwaukee Braves; 1957–1958
Preceded by St. Louis Browns; 1885–1888	American Association champions Brooklyn Bridegrooms; 1889	Succeeded by Louisville Colonels; 1890
