= James Mulvey =

American baseball executive (1899–1973)

- Born: April 23, 1899; New York City, New York, U.S.
- Died: December 3, 1973 (aged 74); Vero Beach, Florida, U.S.
- Education: Columbia University
- Known for: Co-owner of the Brooklyn / Los Angeles Dodgers (1938–1973); President, Samuel Goldwyn Productions
- Spouse: Dearie McKeever
- Relatives: Stephen McKeever (father-in-law); Ralph Branca (son-in-law)

James Ausley Mulvey (April 23, 1899 – December 3, 1973) was an American motion picture industry executive and a co-owner of the Brooklyn / Los Angeles Dodgers of Major League Baseball from 1938 until his death. He derived his stake in the Dodgers from his marriage to Marie "Dearie" McKeever, daughter of one of the franchise's longtime co-owners. Together, the Mulveys controlled their 25 percent share of the team until Dearie's death in November 1968; James and their heirs continued as co-owners until selling their stock in 1975.

James Mulvey was born in Yorkville, Manhattan, and attended All Saints Parochial School in Harlem. Originally an accountant, he at one point served as president of Samuel Goldwyn Productions, for which he worked from 1923 until his retirement in 1960. Mulvey also served a term as president of the Society of Independent Motion Picture Producers.

The Mulveys inherited their share of the Brooklyn Dodgers from the estate of Dearie's father, Stephen McKeever, who died on March 7, 1938. A contractor, McKeever had been a one-fourth partner in the team since 1912, including during the financing and construction of Ebbets Field. By 1938, the remaining 75 percent of Dodger stock was controlled by the Brooklyn Trust Company. Then, in 1944 and 1945, the bank ended its trusteeship by selling its holdings to three men — Walter O'Malley, Branch Rickey and John L. Smith – who each became, with the Mulveys, one-quarter partners in the team. During this time, the Dodgers made history by integrating the major leagues through signing Baseball Hall of Famer Jackie Robinson, followed by other Black stars like Roy Campanella and Don Newcombe.

In October of 1950, O'Malley bought out Rickey's share to become 50 percent owner and club president. He operated the team, with the Mulveys and Smith's widow as minority partners, in Brooklyn through 1957, then transferred the franchise to Los Angeles. In January 1958, O'Malley acquired Mary Louise Smith's stock to become 75 percent owner. As the team became entrenched and successful in Southern California, the Mulveys continued as minority owners.

Five years after Dearie Mulvey's 1968 death, James died at Vero Beach, Florida, where the Dodgers held spring training and he had a winter home, on December 3, 1973, at age 74. He was buried in Brooklyn after a funeral was held in White Plains, where the Mulveys had resided since 1951. His survivors included son-in-law Ralph Branca, the former Brooklyn Dodgers' pitcher.

O'Malley purchased the Mulvey family heirs' 25 percent interest in the team in 1975 to become sole owner. The Mulveys' 37-year involvement in their ownership saw the Dodgers win 12 National League pennants and the first four World Series championships in team history.
