= Dearie Mulvey =

American baseball executive (1898–1968)

- Born: Elizabeth Marie McKeever; June 1898; Brooklyn, New York, U.S.
- Died: November 24, 1968 (aged 70); White Plains, New York, U.S.
- Known for: Co-owner of the Brooklyn / Los Angeles Dodgers (1938–1968)
- Spouse: James Mulvey
- Relatives: Stephen McKeever (father)

Elizabeth Marie "Dearie" Mulvey (née McKeever; June 1898 – November 24, 1968) was the co-owner of the Brooklyn Dodgers of the National League from 1938 through 1950, then 25 percent minority owner through her death, with her husband, James Mulvey. In 1938, she inherited one-quarter share of the club from her father Stephen McKeever's estate. In 1950, Walter O'Malley assumed majority control of the Dodgers. The Mulvey's minority share was purchased by O'Malley in 1975, 17 years after the team moved from Brooklyn to Los Angeles.

She died at White Plains, New York in 1968.
