= Brooklyn Trust Company =

American bank (1866–1950)

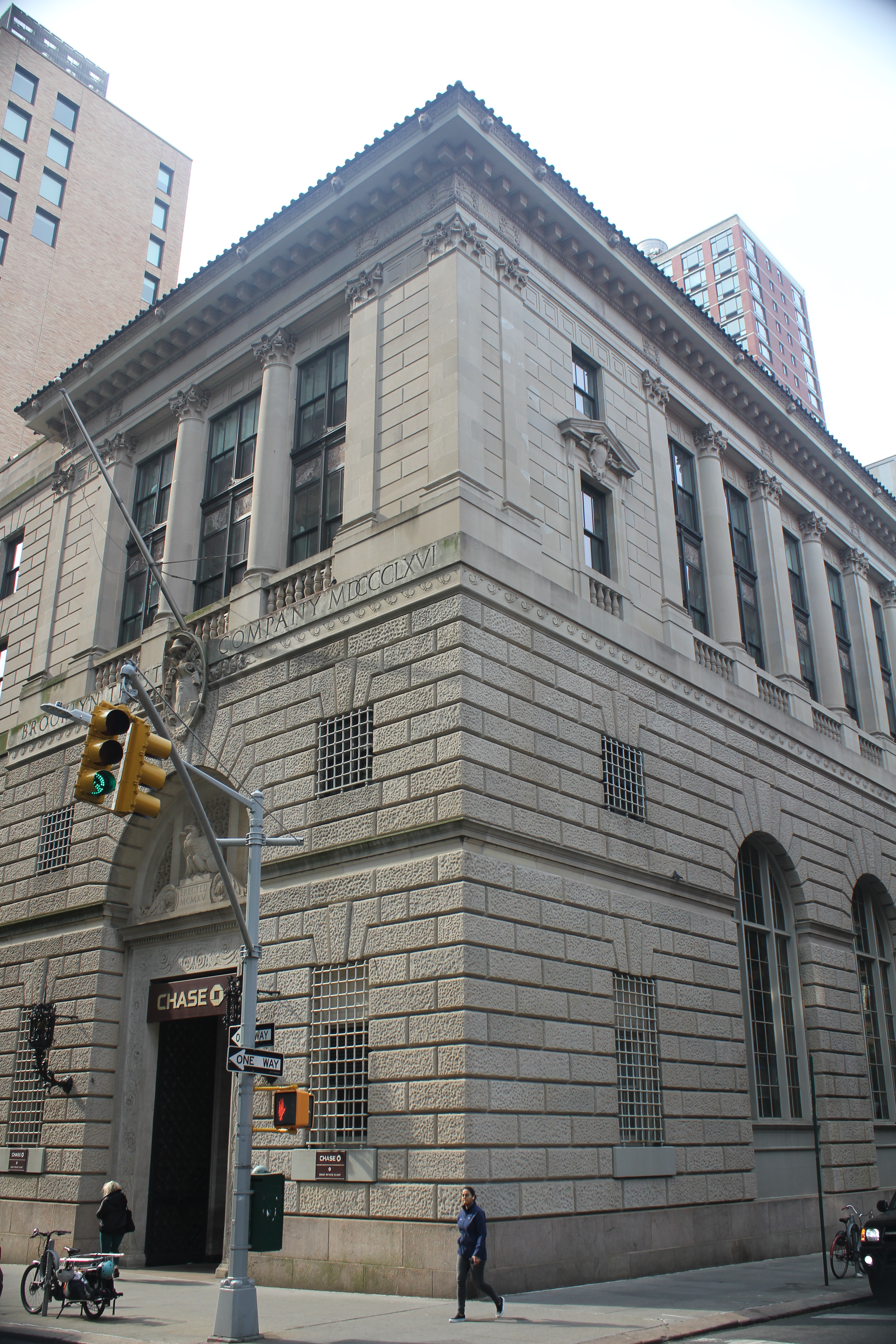
The Brooklyn Trust Company Building, the bank's former headquarters at 177 Montague Street in Brooklyn Heights

The Brooklyn Trust Company was a bank headquartered in New York City, United States. Chartered in the then-independent city of Brooklyn in 1866, the Brooklyn Trust Company originally offered trust management and estate management services but also functioned as a commercial bank. The Brooklyn Trust Company acquired over a dozen smaller banks throughout its existence, merging with the Manufacturers Trust Company in 1950.

== History ==
=== 1860s to 1890s ===
The Brooklyn Trust Company received its charter from the New York State Legislature on April 14, 1866. According to a book written by the bank, there had been high demand for "a strong banking institution which should act as executor or trustee" in Brooklyn. The board of incorporators included several locally prominent figures such as philanthropist Henry E. Pierrepont; collector J. Carson Brevoort; builder Daniel Chauncey; attorneys Jasper W. Gilbert and Alexander McCue; real estate developer John T. Runcie; politician William Wall; and businessman James Weaver. The bank opened in June 1868, with Ethelbert S. Mills as its first president, and was originally located at Court and Joralemon Streets. The bank relocated to the corner of Clinton and Montague Streets in 1873. The structure, at 177 Montague Street, had been built in the 1850s as the residence of politician George Taylor and was expanded several times thereafter.

The bank temporarily suspended operations in July 1873, resuming business the next month. Mills killed himself after the bank suspended operations, believing that the bank was in decline. No one ever publicly accused him of mismanaging the bank, and a two-month investigation found that it was solvent. Ripley Ropes succeeded Mills as president and oversaw the bank's growth over the next two decades. During this time, the Brooklyn Trust Company functioned as a commercial bank, although it also offered trust management and estate management services. Ropes died in 1890. After Ropes's death, Christian S. Christensen was the bank's third president until 1900, when he retired.

=== 1900s and 1910s ===
Theodore S. Miller was the bank's fourth president, leading it from 1900 until his death in 1913. The Brooklyn Trust Company leased a site at the southeast corner of Bedford Avenue and Fulton Street, within the Bedford neighborhood of Brooklyn, in February 1903 and opened its first branch there the next month. The Brooklyn Trust Company's board of directors approved the construction of a branch in the Financial District of Manhattan in January 1907 and opened a location at Broadway and Wall Street that May.

The Brooklyn Trust Company agreed to take over the Long Island Loan and Trust Company at the end of 1912, with combined capital and surplus of $5.5 million, and the two banks merged that March. Edwin P. Maynard took over as the fifth president of the Brooklyn Trust Company in June 1913, and Brooklyn Trust replaced its Montague Street headquarters with the Brooklyn Trust Company Building between 1913 and 1916. Under Maynard's leadership, the bank continued to expand.

=== 1920s to 1940s ===
Brooklyn Trust was a member of the New York Clearing House Association for fourteen years. The bank withdrew in 1922 after the association implemented new rules that forced commercial banks to pay lower interest rates. During the 1920s, Brooklyn Trust opened additional branches in Bay Ridge and Flatbush. Maynard stepped down as president in 1927, becoming the chairman of the bank's board of trustees, while George Vincent McLaughlin became the sixth president of the Brooklyn Trust Company. McLaughlin was a fan of the Brooklyn Dodgers baseball team and, under his tenure, Brooklyn Trust managed the estate of the Dodgers' owner Charles Ebbets. The bank hired lawyer Walter O'Malley in 1943 to manage the Dodgers' legal issues; O'Malley eventually gained control of the team and moved the Dodgers to Los Angeles. Because of Brooklyn Trust's involvement in managing Ebbets's estate, the bank was sometimes erroneously cited as an owner of the Dodgers.

During late 1927, Brooklyn Trust acquired the Coney Island Bank from the National American Company. By the end of the next year, the bank had eight Brooklyn branches and one Manhattan branch. The boards of directors of the Brooklyn Trust Company and the Mechanics Bank of Brooklyn agreed in January 1929 to merge their respective banks, and stockholders of both banks approved the merger later that month. The combined institution had assets of at least $167 million. The safe-deposit divisions of Brooklyn Trust and the Mechanics Bank were not merged until 1931. Brooklyn Trust's board of directors agreed that December to acquire the State Bank of Richmond County and the Guardian National Bank of New York, which gave Brooklyn Trust four additional branches.

By the 1930s, the Brooklyn Trust Company had 31 branches in New York City, including in Queens and Staten Island. One of the bank's branches, within Park Slope, was modeled after the design of its main headquarters on Montague Street. Brooklyn Trust sold off its last branch in Staten Island in 1940. The bank then rejoined the New York Clearing House Association in 1943. All 700 of Brooklyn Trust's employees went on strike in July 1947, in what news media described at the time as the first major walkout in a major American bank; this strike lasted for a month. In July 1950, the bank was authorized to establish a personal loan department at one or more branches.

=== Manufacturers Trust merger ===
The Brooklyn Trust Company continued to acquire smaller banks; by 1950, over twelve smaller institutions had been merged with Brooklyn Trust. That August, The Wall Street Journal reported that Chase Bank and Manufacturers Trust were both considering acquiring Brooklyn Trust, following nearly two years of rumors that Brooklyn Trust was to be merged with a larger bank. Manufacturers Trust outbid Chase Bank and agreed to acquire Brooklyn Trust at the beginning of September 1950. The boards of directors of both banks approved the merger on September 7, 1950. The acquisition was the largest merger of banks in the New York City area since 1932. The Wall Street Journal called the negotiations "the most intensive competitive auction in New York City banking history since the late '20s".

Shareholders of both banks voted on October 11, 1950, to approve the merger, and the Brooklyn Trust Company merged into the Manufacturers Trust Company at the close of business on October 13. At the time of the merger, the Brooklyn Trust Company had about $226 million in deposits, spread across 26 branches, of which 20 were in Brooklyn. Following further mergers in the late 20th century, Manufacturers Trust merged into Chemical Bank, which became part of Chase Bank in 1996 and JPMorgan Chase in 2000.

== Headquarters building ==
The Brooklyn Trust Company Building is at the corner of Montague and Clinton Streets in Brooklyn Heights. The Italian Renaissance-inspired headquarters was designed by the architectural firm of York and Sawyer, and it was modeled after the Palazzo della Gran Guardia in Verona. The building was built on the same site as the bank's previous headquarters. The interior of the banking hall is designed with elements of Ancient Roman architecture and Italian Renaissance architecture, including Cosmati marble floors and a vaulted ceiling.

Marc Eidlitz & Son constructed the building in two phases: the northern section opened in September 1915, while the southern section was completed in September 1916. The building's facade and the banking hall's interior were designated as New York City landmarks in 1996, and the structure was listed on the National Register of Historic Places in 2009. The various successors of the Brooklyn Trust Company owned the building until 2007, when JPMorgan Chase sold it for $9.7 million. Stahl Real Estate Company converted the upper floors to residential condominiums between 2012 and 2015.

== Sources ==
- Brooklyn Trust Company Building (PDF) (Report). New York City Landmarks Preservation Commission. June 25, 1996.
- Brooklyn Trust Company Building (PDF) (Report). National Register of Historic Places, National Park Service. August 20, 2009.
