= Henry Medicus =

American baseball executive (1865–1941)

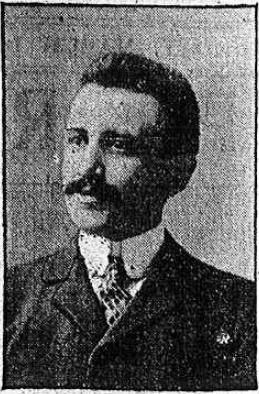
Medicus in the March 18, 1905 edition of the Brooklyn Daily Eagle.

Henry W. Medicus (January 29, 1865 – May 13, 1941) was a wealthy American furniture dealer in Brooklyn, New York in the early 1900s. He became a part owner of the Brooklyn Dodgers baseball team in 1905 when he and Charles Ebbets bought out the shares of the team owned by Harry Von der Horst. He remained a part owner of the ballclub until selling his shares in 1912.
