= Ferdinand Abell =

Ferdinand A. Abell
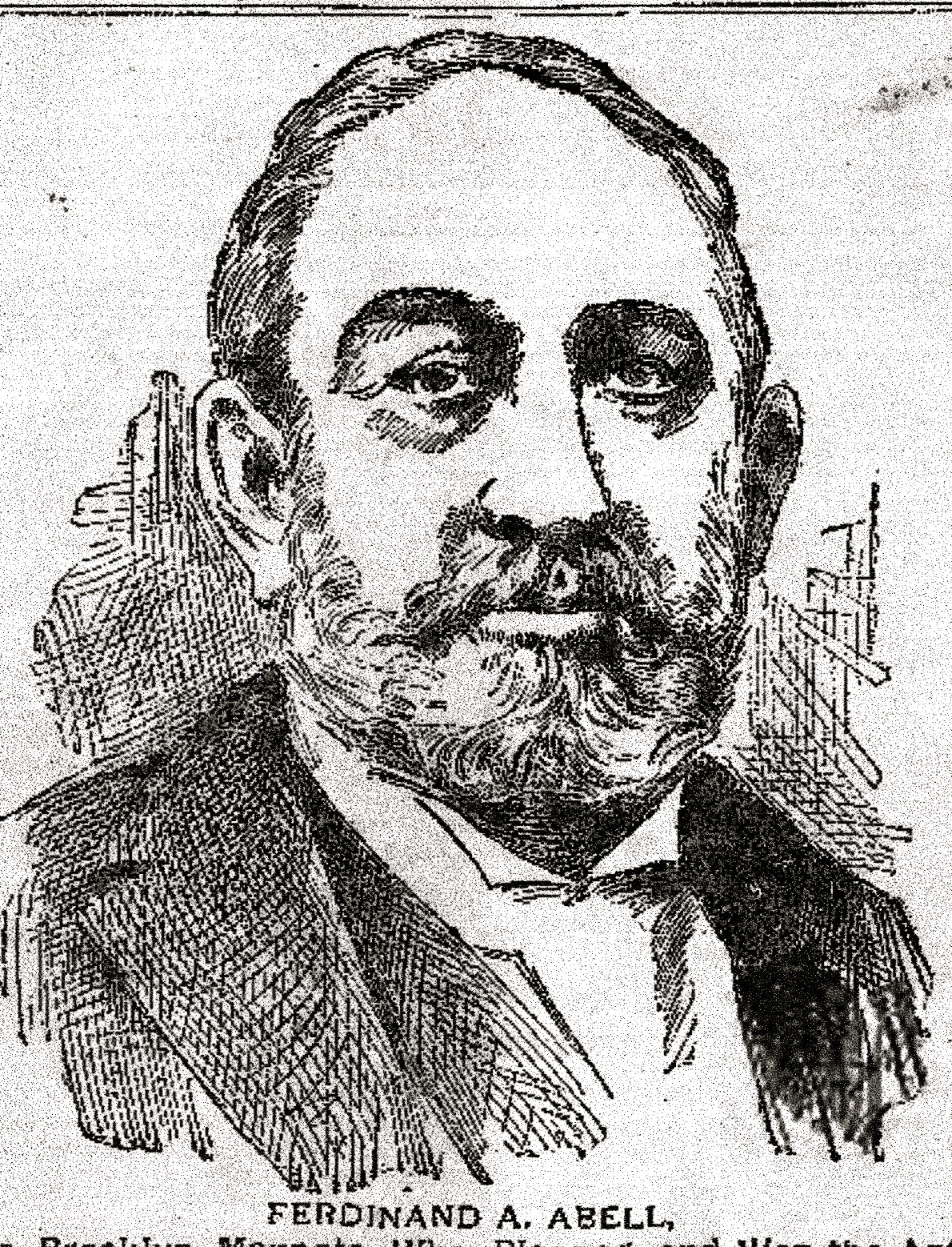
- Ferdinand "Gus" Abell
- Born: July 8, 1833; Pawtucket, Rhode Island, U.S.
- Died: November 8, 1913 (aged 80); Yarmouth, Massachusetts, U.S.
- Other names: Gus
- Occupation: Founder of the team that became the Brooklyn Dodgers
- Years active: 1883–1907

Ferdinand Augustus "Gus" Abell (July 8, 1833 – November 8, 1913) was an American businessman and one of the original founders of the team that became the Brooklyn Dodgers. A Rhode Island casino owner, he put up most of the money to form the team in 1883 and also was the leading financing behind the building of Washington Park, the home of the ballclub.

He stuck primarily to the business side of the franchise, letting his partners Charlie Byrne, George Taylor and Joseph Doyle supervise the team's actual on-field activities.

He was the leading force behind the Dodgers merger with the original Baltimore Orioles in 1898. He remained part of the Dodgers ownership group until he was bought out by Charles Ebbets in 1907.

He died of Bright's disease in 1913.
