= John L. Smith (pharmaceutical executive) =

- Born: Johann Schmitz; February 10, 1889; Krefeld, Rhenish Prussia, German Empire
- Died: July 10, 1950 (aged 61); Brooklyn, New York, United States
- Occupations: Pharmaceutical executive (Pfizer); Major League Baseball team co-owner (Brooklyn Dodgers)

John Lawrence Smith (February 10, 1889 – July 10, 1950) was a German-born American chemist, pharmaceutical industry executive, and sportsman. He was born Johann Schmitz in Krefeld, Prussia, in the German Empire. When he was three years old, his family emigrated to the United States and settled in Stonington, Connecticut. He became a naturalized U.S. citizen in 1908 and the family legally changed its name to Smith in 1918.

== Career at Pfizer ==
Smith first joined Charles Pfizer and Company at age 17 while he was studying at night at Cooper Union (he received his degree in chemistry in 1911), and would spend almost his entire business career at the Brooklyn-based pharmaceuticals giant. He rose to the positions of director (1918), secretary (1925), vice president (1929), president (1945) and chairman of the board (1949). His only absence from Pfizer, from 1913 to 1918, came when he was a general superintendent at E. R. Squibb and Sons. In the early 1940s, he supervised Pfizer's successful development of a process for the large-scale manufacturing of penicillin and is credited as having led the transformation of Pfizer from a chemicals supplier to a research-based pharmaceuticals company.

== Co-owner of Brooklyn Dodgers ==
A baseball player as a youth in Connecticut and a lifelong fan, Smith became an investor in the Brooklyn Dodgers of Major League Baseball in 1944, and the following year he became a one-quarter owner of the franchise, an equal partner along with Dearie Mulvey (with her husband, James), Walter O'Malley and Branch Rickey. Under the quartet, the Dodgers won two National League pennants (1947; 1949), and made history by breaking the six-decade-old baseball color line with the 1947 debut of Baseball Hall of Famer Jackie Robinson. But O'Malley and Rickey clashed over control of the Dodgers and developed a deep animosity; over time, Smith became more sympathetic with O'Malley's position.

In February 1950, newly turned 61, Smith was stricken with lung cancer. Surgery proved unable to halt the spread of the disease and he died at his Prospect Park West home in Park Slope, Brooklyn, on July 10.

His illness and death coincided with a critical period for the Dodgers. Rickey's five-year contract as club president and general manager was due to expire at the end of October 1950. O'Malley secured the support of Smith's widow, Mary Louise, and refused to renew Rickey's contract, effectively forcing him to sell his shares in the Brooklyn club. O'Malley then acquired Rickey's one-quarter interest, making him the team's largest shareholder with 50 percent. He purchased Mrs. Smith's stock in January 1958—the Dodgers' debut season in Los Angeles—to gain 75 percent control of the franchise, and became sole owner in 1975.
