= George Taylor (baseball manager) =

George J. Taylor (November 22, 1853 – October 28, 1911 in New York City) was the city editor of James Gordon Bennett's New York Herald. He noticed that his readers had a craving for baseball news. Together with Charles Byrne and Joseph Doyle they decided to form a team in Brooklyn to compete in the new Inter-State Association of Professional Baseball Clubs. They convinced casino operator Ferdinand Abell to put up the cash and got the team off the ground. The group also oversaw the construction of the team's first ballpark at Washington Park.

Managed by Doyle and Byrne that first season, the team won the Interstate League title. The owners celebrated by pulling the team from the league (which quickly folded) and joining the more prestigious American Association.

Taylor was the manager of the team for its first season in the AA, achieving a 40-64 record and finishing in ninth place in a crowded field. He would step aside after the season for more experienced baseball men to take over.
