= Charlie Byrne (baseball) =

American baseball manager and realtor

Charles H. Byrne
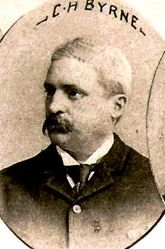
- Charlie Byrne
- Born: September 1843
- Died: January 4, 1898 (aged 54)
- Occupation: Founder of the team that became the Brooklyn Dodgers
- Years active: 1883–1898

Charles H. Byrne (September 1843–January 4, 1898) was a New York realtor who was one of the original founders of the team that became the Brooklyn Dodgers (now the Los Angeles Dodgers).

Byrne was a graduate of St. Francis Xavier College, and after graduation he worked as a writer for a newspaper.

Byrne, his brother-in-law Joseph Doyle, New York Herald editor George J. Taylor, and Rhode Island casino owner Ferdinand Abell formed a group that raised the money to found the Brooklyn ball club in 1883, known originally as simply the "Brooklyns". They leased land on Fifth Avenue in Brooklyn to build Washington Park, the team's original home, which cost $30,000. In its first year, the team played in the minor-league Inter-State Association of Professional Baseball Clubs, winning the league championship. Having attracted a following, the owners moved the franchise in 1884 to the American Association (AA), a competitor to the more established National League (NL), that catered to a more working-class crowd.

After managing the team from 1885 to 1887, Byrne saw the franchise join the National League in 1890, and remained in the ownership group until his death in 1898. Under his tenure, the team, known variously as the Brooklyns, Bridegrooms and Grooms, posted a record of 567-506 and won two league championships (the AA in 1889 and the NL in 1890).

Byrne was in ill health at the time of the National League meeting in November 1897, but he insisted on making the journey from Virginia, where he had been recovering, to the event in Philadelphia. After the meeting concluded, his health took a turn for the worse, from which he never recovered. Byrne was buried at Calvary Cemetery in Woodside, Queens, New York.

Preceded by (none)	President of the Brooklyn Dodgers; 1883-1898	Succeeded by Charles Ebbets
