= Joseph Doyle (baseball) =

Baseball executive

Joseph Doyle was the brother-in-law of Charlie Byrne and part of the original ownership team of what became the Brooklyn Dodgers.
