= Charles Ebbets =

American sports executive (1859–1925)

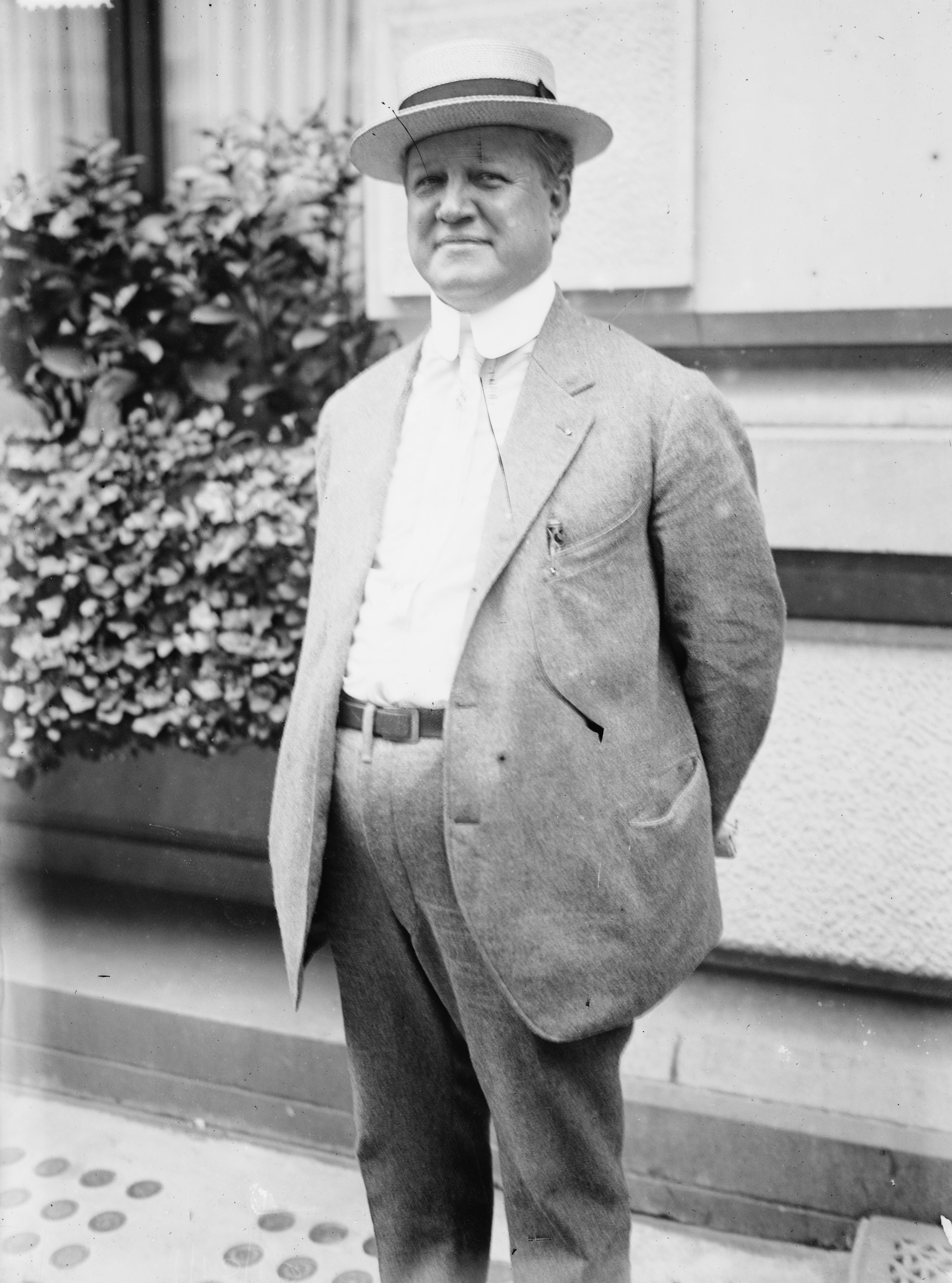
- Ebbets Sr., circa 1915
- Born: October 29, 1859; New York City, New York, U.S.
- Died: April 18, 1925 (aged 65); New York City, New York, U.S.
- Occupations: Architect; owner of Brooklyn Dodgers

Charles Henry Ebbets, Sr. (October 29, 1859 – April 18, 1925) was an American sports executive who served as co-owner of the Brooklyn Dodgers from 1897 to 1902 before becoming majority owner of the team, doing so until his death in 1925. He also served as president of the Brooklyn Dodgers from 1898 to 1925.

== Biography ==
Ebbets was born in Brooklyn Heights, Brooklyn in New York City at his parents’ home at 31 Clark Street on October 29, 1859. In his documentary Baseball, Ken Burns misidentifies Charlie’s father as Daniel Ebbets (1785–1855), a Wall Street banker; however, Daniel was of a generation earlier than Charlie’s actual father. His father actually was John B. Ebbets (ca. 1824–March 16, 1888), a tavern owner on the corner of Hudson and Dominick Streets in lower Manhattan. John was of the fifth generation of the Ebbets family in New York City, a descendant of Daniel Ebbets (September 14, 1665–after 1724), a brickmaker who had arrived in New York from England in 1700. His mother, Anna Maria Quick (ca. 1824–July 8, 1871), was in the fifth generation of a Dutch family that had been in New York since the 1640s. Ebbets first attended Public School 39 on Clark Street but left that school when his father moved to Astoria, Queens shortly after 1871.

Following his schooling, he took up residence at 154 Alexander Avenue near 135th. His first job was with Dick & Fitzgerald, a publishing firm at 18 Ann Street in Manhattan. He then began work as an architect with the firm of William T. Beer. His work there as a draftsman and building designer would serve him well in later years when he decided to build a baseball stadium. He next became a bookkeeper with Frank Leslie's publishing house, a job he kept until he turned his attention to baseball.

Ebbets was not only a baseball person, as he also was a fan of bowling. He was a member of the Prospect Club, the Carleton Club, and the Commonwealth Council team of the Royal Arcanum Bowling League. In 1889 he played with the Stars of South Brooklyn and the Lincoln Council Bowlers. The following year he joined the Prospects, the arch-rivals of the Lincoln Council team, and was elected their captain. In 1893, his bowling average was 170 in more than fifty games. That year the Brooklyn Eagle stated, “He is considered one of the swiftest and, at the same time, truest bowlers in Brooklyn.”

== Brooklyn ==
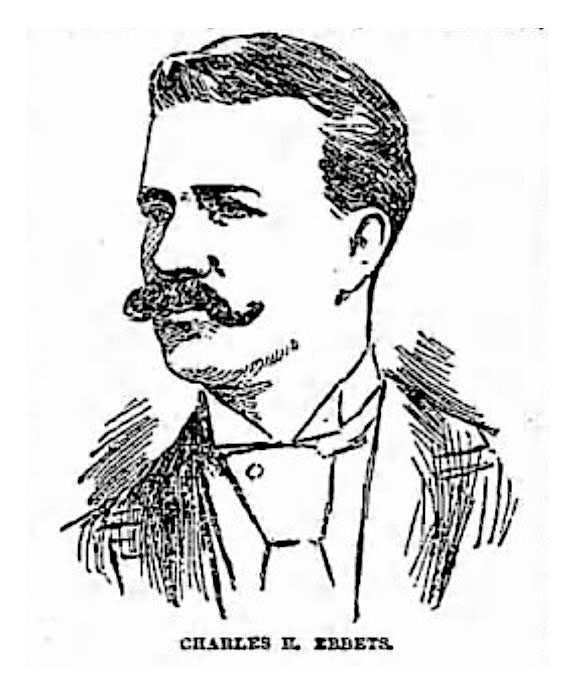
Drawing of Ebbets in The Brooklyn Daily Eagle in 1895, at the time of the founding of the American Bowling Congress. Ebbets was prominent in the early days of organized ten-pin bowling.

In 1883, his brother Jack had introduced him to Joseph Doyle and George Taylor, friends of his who had recently formed the Brooklyn Base Ball Association with Ferdinand Abell and Charles Byrne. Ebbets got a job working for the team selling tickets, score cards, and peanuts at their Washington Park stadium at Fifth Avenue and Third Street. He printed the score cards himself. In 1891 the Brooklyn Bridegrooms (as they were then known) moved to a larger field called Eastern Park. Several years later, they had to move again, this time to the 18,000-seat “Washington Park 2nd” at the original site. On the afternoon of April 30, 1898, the first game was played at the new Washington Park. The Brooklyn Daily Eagle wrote the following day, “The ball season is on in Brooklyn—inaugurated at the new grounds in South Brooklyn yesterday before a crowd of 15,000.” The Eagle also reported that “The heart of the fan to-day is heavy as lead,” as Brooklyn lost to the Philadelphia Phillies, 6–4. During that 1898 season, he served as field manager for 106 games, compiling a 38–68 record.

By 1890, he had saved enough money to make an investment in the team, and he continued to buy stock whenever he could. That same year, the Bridegrooms won the National League pennant in their first year in the league. In January 1898, he owned 80 percent of the stock, the other 20 percent being held by the club's then president, Charles H. Byrne. In reporting his controlling interest, the New York Times reported, “Mr. Ebbets is thirty-eight years old. He signed with the club in 1882, when it was in the Inter-State League. He has been Treasurer ever since, and has handled every dollar that came into the club in fifteen years.” Byrne died three days later and Ebbets was elected president of the ball club on January 13, 1898. In 1899, the Superbas won the National League pennant, their second in nine years. They would win the pennant the following year.

He knew that the Washington Park site would not do for the game of baseball that he envisioned. It was a wooden structure and subject, therefore, to fire and significant maintenance. It was also located in South Brooklyn, near several factories and a canal whose unpleasant odors (and factory smoke) permeated the air. Scouting around Brooklyn for an alternate site, his attention soon focused on an area in Flatbush known as “Pigtown”—so called because it was a local dump occupied principally by squatters. A major part of its attraction was that nine separate trolley car lines converged near the site. Ebbets had already learned that it was important to get the fans to the game. He quietly began to purchase individual lots in Pigtown over a four-year period. By 1911 he had acquired 5½ acres of land for the bargain price of $100,000.

In 1912, he sold half of his holdings in the Superbas to raise the $750,000 needed to build a new stadium and construction of the Superbas’ new 25,000-seat stadium at 55 Sullivan Place near the intersection of Empire Boulevard (called Malbone Street at the time) and Bedford Avenue in Brooklyn was completed and Ebbets Field opened for its first ballgame. Following an exhibition game on April 5 in which the Superbas beat the Yankees 3–2, opening day of April 9, 1913, saw a packed house witness the Philadelphia Phillies defeat the Superbas 1–0. Not only was he now a half-owner and president of the Brooklyn Superbas Baseball Club in the National League, he also had a stadium named in his honor.

In addition to his service to the Brooklyn Dodgers, he was politically active. He served as a Democratic assemblyman representing the Twelfth District in the New York State legislature in 1896. The following year, in a Republican landslide when William McKinley won the White House, Ebbets lost his bid for re-election. In November 1897, he won election to the Municipal Council of Greater New York from his district in Brooklyn. His term in the council ran for four years until 1901. The next year he decided to run as a Democratic candidate from Brooklyn for the New York state Senate. He ran in the election of 1904 but was defeated by 777 votes. That loss ended his political aspirations.

Charles married first April 10, 1878, Minnie Frances Amelia Broadbent, born January 1, 1858, in New York City. Minnie was the daughter of English parents James Broadbent and Amelia Preston. They were married at Trinity Church by Rev. Thomas H. Sill. Charles, at age 18, was nearly two years younger than his 20-year-old bride.

About 1903, he was invited to a poker game at the Hotel Somerset on West 47th Street in New York City. The hotel was operated by a friend, Claude R. Nott. While at the game, he met Claude's wife, Grace, and apparently became infatuated with her. When Nott determined that his wife was being unfaithful to him he sued for divorce. Claude and Grace Nott's divorce was finalized on January 6, 1909. By 1910 he and Minnie had apparently separated, as Minnie was then living at 214 Parkside Avenue in Brooklyn. By 1915, Ebbets was living with Grace Slade at 1466 Avenue G in Brooklyn.

In 1916, his team (known as the Robins due to their manager, Wilbert Robinson) won the National League pennant (their first in sixteen years), advancing to the 1916 World Series. They lost to the Boston Red Sox in five games. Four years later, the Robins won the pennant again, though they once again lost in the World Series, this time to the Cleveland Indians in seven games.

== Final years and death ==
In September 1919, Minnie sued for divorce. The following year he and Minnie made an out-of-court settlement establishing an alimony payment to her of $6,500 per year for twelve years. Their divorce was finalized in January 1922. Minnie received an annual allowance of $7,500 and to guarantee those payments he deposited his shares of the Dodgers with the Mechanics Bank in Brooklyn as trustee. On May 8, 1922, he married Grace Slade as his second wife in Bridgeport, Connecticut.

In 1924, he and Grace had a house built in Clearwater, Florida, and he moved the Dodgers to that town to practice in the spring. The following year, he and Grace again went to Clearwater to attend spring training for the Dodgers. Returning to New York in April, Ebbets checked into his room at the Waldorf-Astoria Hotel where he stayed when the Dodgers were playing in town. He felt unwell and was confined to his room for two weeks. Early on the morning of April 18, 1925, he fell into a deep sleep and awoke only briefly. Charles H. Ebbets died of heart failure that afternoon in his suite at the Waldorf Hotel. He was 65 years old. His funeral was held at Trinity Church on April 21 and he was buried at Green-Wood Cemetery in Brooklyn. That day all baseball games in the National League were canceled in his honor and the flags at all of the National League baseball parks would fly at half-staff for the next 30 days.

== Legacy ==
Ebbets was a hands-on baseball owner who introduced numerous concepts into the game that still live on in some form in the present day. His first concept was Ladies' Day in 1899, in which women were admitted into the ballpark for a reduced fee. He also helped in changing the length of the Major League Baseball schedule from 140 to 154 games in 1904, based on the distances required to visit each club in the league. In 1906, he helped in the installation of separate batting and fielding practices for his Dodger team and the visiting team along with separate dressing rooms with lockers and running water (at the time, the visiting team came dressed from their hotel before arriving at the ballpark, often getting jeered or pelted by the home fans). He also came up with the "rain check" in 1911, in which a detached portion of the ticket could be used in the event of a rain-out. Two years later, he came up with the idea for the player's draft, in which the team with the worst record gets the first picks in the draft. During an exhibition game in Memphis on March 28, 1917, between his team and the Boston Red Sox, the two teams wore numbers on their sleeves due to his belief that fans in a non-major league city like Memphis wouldn't be familiar with the players. He proposed having all teams to put numbers on the players' sleeves or caps during a National League meeting on December 13, 1922, but it was left to the discretion of the teams (the practice of numbers on uniforms did not come into popularity until 1929). In 1925, he persuaded others to adopt as a permanent rule the 2–3–2 game pattern used in the previous World Series. This format is still used today.

When he built Ebbets Field, he said, “Later I hope the players will capture a pennant, to make the combination complete.” During his lifetime, he saw two pennants (1916 and 1920) while playing under the field that bore his name, although he never saw a World Series title. The Dodgers did not win a World Series until 1955. Five years after the title (and three years after the team left Brooklyn), his stadium was demolished. The Ebbets Field Apartments now stand on the site.

When he died, his estate was valued at $1,115,257—most of it being in his half ownership of the Brooklyn Dodgers Baseball Club and the Ebbets Field property. His widow, Grace Slade Ebbets, and son-in-law, Joseph Gilleaudeau, were named executors. His will, however, stipulated that his shares in the Dodgers be kept intact and sold as a unit. No buyer of this large block could be found until 1945 when it was sold to Branch Rickey (then president of the Dodgers), Walter O'Malley (the Dodgers’ attorney, who later became president of the club and was responsible for moving it to Los Angeles), and John L. Smith (president of Charles Pfizer & Co.). Further complications arose as the other three of Charlie's children, Charles, Jr., Maie Ebbets Cadore, and Anna Ebbets Booth, contested decisions made by the executors—pitting them in a sibling dispute against their brother-in-law, Joseph Gilleaudeau. The Great Depression in the 1930s also drained resources established for the annual payments intended for his heirs, which ceased in 1933. Settlement of the estate was tied up in the New York Surrogate's Court for nearly a quarter century. It was finally settled on December 14, 1949. His widow, his three daughters, his son's widow, and other heirs (22 in all) divided $838,558.

After Charlie's death, Grace eventually moved out to Long Island, living in a home at 41 Kenilworth Road, Mineola, New York. She died in that home on April 26, 1959. Services were held at Freeport, Long Island, and she was buried at Green-Wood Cemetery on April 29, 1959, next to Charles.

== Timeline ==
- 1883 Bookkeeper
- 1898 President and manager
- 1899 Won pennant
- 1900 Won pennant
- 1912 Ebbets Field built
- 1916 Won pennant
- 1920 Won pennant

== See also ==
- Honor Rolls of Baseball

New York State Assembly
Preceded by John H. Campbell	New York State Assembly; Kings County, 12th District; 1896	Succeeded by Henry E. Abell
Preceded by Charlie Byrne	President of the Brooklyn Dodgers; 1898–1925	Succeeded by Ed McKeever
