= 2011–12 Los Angeles Dodgers ownership dispute =

The 2011–12 Los Angeles Dodgers ownership dispute was a period of turmoil at the management level of the Los Angeles Dodgers organization over parts of the 2011 and 2012 seasons. The dispute began on April 20, 2011 when Major League Baseball (MLB) announced it would appoint a trustee with final authority over all significant team expenditures, effectively seizing control of the team from owner Frank McCourt. The following dispute over ownership of the franchise was not resolved until the team was sold to new owners one year later, on May 1, 2012.

MLB Commissioner Bud Selig announced that he felt compelled to act due to concerns over the Dodgers' finances and the ability of McCourt to run the team. In June, as the Dodgers struggled to meet payroll, Selig rejected a television contract that would have pumped money into the organization. This led to the Dodgers filing for bankruptcy and being forced to negotiate a loan with MLB to keep the club operating.

After a year of negotiations and court proceedings, the dispute ended with the sale of the team to Guggenheim Baseball Management LLC.

== Background ==
Frank McCourt and his wife Jamie purchased the Dodgers from the Fox Entertainment Group in 2004. In order to arrange the purchase, McCourt needed a $145 million loan from Fox, for which he used his Boston parking lots as collateral. Fox eventually foreclosed on the parking lot property and sold it. Under McCourt's ownership, the Dodgers made the playoffs four times and advanced to the National League Championship Series twice.

On October 14, 2009, it was announced the McCourts would be separating after nearly thirty years of marriage. While speculation was raised on the impact upon the family's ownership of the Dodgers, a spokesperson for Jamie said the following day that "the focus of the Dodgers is on the playoffs and the World Series". Jamie was fired from her position as Dodgers CEO on Thursday, October 22, 2009, the day after the Dodgers were eliminated from the playoffs, thus ending the reign of the self-proclaimed "First Female CEO of a Baseball Team." She officially filed for divorce shortly thereafter. McCourt then accused Jamie of having an affair with her bodyguard and changed the locks on her office. He claimed at the time that the divorce would have "no bearing on the team whatsoever".

On December 7, 2010, the judge in the divorce case invalidated the post-nuptial marital property agreement ("MPA") that McCourt had claimed provided him with sole ownership of the Dodgers. In the wake of this decision, McCourt's lawyers said that he would use other legal avenues to establish his sole ownership of the team, while Jamie's lawyers said that she would be confirmed as the co-owner of the team as community property of their marriage.

On March 31, 2011, after the Opening Day game against the San Francisco Giants, a Giants fan was attacked by two men wearing Dodgers attire in the Dodger Stadium parking lot. The fan suffered serious injuries and was diagnosed with brain damage. McCourt was criticized for his response to the incident. The attack put a damper on attendance at Dodger games, and led to the Dodgers incurring increased expenses in security.

On April 5, 2011, McCourt presented MLB Commissioner Bud Selig with a contract giving Fox broadcasting rights to the team for the next twenty years. The deal was said to be valued at between US$2.5 to US$3 billion. Fox also provided McCourt with a personal loan of $30 million to cover the Dodgers payroll. To secure the loan, McCourt promised Fox he would pay them back with money from a settlement or judgment against the law firm that drafted the invalidated marital agreement. The firm responded by filing a lawsuit against McCourt, seeking a judicial declaration that the firm is not responsible for him losing control of the Dodgers.

Just prior to MLB taking over the Dodgers, TMZ.com reported that the Internal Revenue Service (IRS) was investigating the McCourts in response to allegations that they had been taking money out of the Dodgers for years without paying taxes.

=== Bud Selig's statement ===
In a statement to the press on April 20, 2011, Selig announced that the commissioner's office was effectively seizing control of the Dodgers.

Pursuant to my authority as Commissioner, I informed Los Angeles Dodgers owner Frank McCourt today that I will appoint a representative to oversee all aspects of the business and the day-to-day operations of the Club. I have taken this action because of my deep concerns regarding the finances and operations of the Dodgers and to protect the best interests of the Club, its great fans and all of Major League Baseball. My office will continue its thorough investigation into the operations and finances of the Dodgers and related entities during the period of Mr. McCourt's ownership. I will announce the name of my representative in the next several days.

The Dodgers have been one of the most prestigious franchises in all of sports, and we owe it to their legion of loyal fans to ensure that this club is being operated properly now and will be guided appropriately in the future.

— Bud Selig

Reactions to Selig's move were generally positive. For example, The New York Times baseball journalist Tyler Kepner editorialized that "Bud Selig has never looked better than he does right now." However, ESPN correspondent Gene Wojciechowski criticized Selig and MLB, making the case that Selig and the twenty-nine other MLB owners at the time turned a blind eye to the financial problems that the McCourts were known to have when they purchased the Dodgers in 2004.

=== Frank McCourt's statement ===
In a statement to the press on April 20, 2011, owner Frank McCourt responded:

Major League Baseball sets strict financial guidelines which all 30 teams must follow. The Dodgers are in compliance with these guidelines. On this basis, it is hard to understand the commissioner's decision today.

— Frank McCourt

Steve Soboroff, hired by McCourt as the Dodgers' vice chairman April 19, 2011, described the takeover of the team's operations as "irresponsible".

=== Tom Schieffer appointed ===
On April 25, 2011, Selig appointed Tom Schieffer, former United States Ambassador to Japan and former president of the Texas Rangers, to oversee the Dodgers' finances. Schieffer had veto power over any team expenditure over $5,000.

== Divorce settlement and rejection of TV deal ==
In June, the cash-strapped McCourt struggled to meet payroll, only meeting it with help from some of his friends. As the Dodgers' end-of-June payroll, which included over $8 million in deferred payments to former Dodger Manny Ramirez, neared, it was reported that McCourt would be unable to meet payroll without the approval of a seventeen-year, $3 billion television deal with Fox Sports Net. However, on June 20, Selig declined to approve the deal, saying it was structured in a way that would have seen most of the money funneled to McCourt. His action also voided a settlement reached on June 17 between Frank and Jamie that divided their assets apart from the Dodgers.

On August 4, a one-day trial was scheduled to decide whether the Dodgers was community property of both McCourts or the property of Frank McCourt alone. However, the trial was canceled when the Dodgers filed for bankruptcy.

Later, the court agreed to a 30- to 45-day trial to settle the divorce and decide who owned the Dodgers. The trial was expected to start in spring or summer of 2012. In the meantime, the McCourts agreed to sell some of their residential holdings. On October 17, 2011, it was announced that the couple had reached a settlement in their divorce case, in which Jamie would give up her claims on the Dodgers and McCourt would pay her about $130 million. The divorce is believed to have been the costliest in California history.

== Bankruptcy Court ==
On June 27, the Dodgers filed for Chapter 11 bankruptcy protection.

(Bud Selig has) turned his back on the Dodgers, treated us differently, and forced us to the point we find ourselves in today. I simply cannot allow the Commissioner to knowingly and intentionally be in a position to expose the Dodgers to financial risk any longer.

— Frank McCourt

My goal from the outset has been to ensure that the Dodgers are being operated properly now and will be guided appropriately in the future for their millions of fans... The action taken today by Mr. McCourt does nothing but inflict further harm to this historic franchise

— Bud Selig

In the filing, the Dodgers sought permission to use a $150 million loan from a hedge fund for daily operations, according to a team news release. If approved, this would allow the team to meet its payroll obligations to Ramirez, Andruw Jones, and others. After the filing, the Dodgers told Tom Schieffer that he no longer had any authority in relation to the Dodgers and refused to let him return to work. MLB filed their own response to the bankruptcy filing, in which they said that the court should reject McCourt's bid to save his ownership by "threatening the immediate demise of one of baseball's great teams." They also asked the court to consider if McCourt should remain the owner during the proceedings and if Schieffer can remain in his position.

In the court hearing on June 28, the Dodgers and MLB agreed that the Dodgers could use the hedge fund financing temporarily, pending a July 20 hearing on MLB's request to take over funding of the Dodgers. The language in McCourt's original filing asking for an auction of the television rights was deleted temporarily, though that could come up again in the next hearing.

As part of the bankruptcy proceedings, McCourt's lawyer served Selig and other top MLB executives with subpoenas, in an attempt to prove that Selig had predetermined that he was going to seize the Dodgers. MLB attorneys responded that allowing McCourt access to MLB documents and executives would turn the hearing into "a multi-ringed side show of mini-trials on his personal disputes." The Judge sided with MLB and ruled that McCourt could not compel the release of the documents or depose Selig because they weren't relevant to the issue of the bankruptcy.

After a hearing on July 20, the judge rejected McCourt's further use of the Highbridge loan and ordered McCourt to negotiate a loan with MLB.

On September 23, MLB made several requests of the court, to be decided at an October 12 hearing. It asked that the judge order the Dodgers seized and sold. It also threatened to block any attempt to sell TV rights (and perhaps even suspend the team from the league for the 2012 season), and alleged that McCourt's lawyers have no standing as he and they are in violation of MLB rules. The Dodgers in a statement said that MLB was trying to force "an unnecessary and value-destroying distressed sale" of the team.

On September 30, Judge Gross ruled that McCourt's lawyers could not attempt discovery by looking into the records of other MLB clubs. However, he did say he expected Selig to testify in person. He set the hearing for MLB and McCourt's lawyers to provide case for and against the sale of the club in early November, where he would rule on various points involving McCourt, the Dodgers, MLB, and the TV contract.

== Sale of the Dodgers ==
On November 1, 2011 McCourt and MLB issued a joint statement that McCourt had agreed to sell the team, the Stadium and the parking lots. The league hoped to have a new owner in place by opening day, 2012.

The Los Angeles Dodgers and Major League Baseball announced today that they have agreed to a court-supervised process to sell the team and its attendant media rights in a manner designed to realize maximum value for the Dodgers and their owner Frank McCourt.

— Joint Statement

Opening bids on the team were due on January 24, 2012. Several groups of potential owners placed bids on the Dodgers, groups known to have placed bids include:

- Magic Johnson, Guggenheim Partners and Stan Kasten
- Hedge fund executive Steven A. Cohen and Arn Tellem
- Developer Rick J. Caruso and former Dodgers manager Joe Torre
- Stanley Gold
- Dennis Gilbert and Larry King
- Dallas Mavericks owner Mark Cuban
- Former Dodger players Orel Hershiser and Steve Garvey
- Former Dodgers owner Peter O'Malley and South Korean conglomerate E-Land
- Former Dodgers GM Fred Claire
- Jared Kushner
- Michael Heisley
- Josh Macciello

After the initial round of bidding, the groups backed by Hershiser and Garvey, Claire, Gilbert and King and Mark Cuban did not advance to the next round, where the remaining bidders were vetted by MLB.

On March 27, 2012, it was announced that an agreement had been reached on the sale of the Dodgers between Frank McCourt and Guggenheim Baseball Management LLC, a group of investors fronted by Guggenheim CEO Mark Walter and including former Los Angeles Lakers player Magic Johnson, baseball executive Stan Kasten and film mogul Peter Guber.

The total sale price for the Dodgers (which includes Dodger Stadium) exceeded $2 billion, making the sale the largest for a professional sports team in history, exceeding the approximately $1.5 billion purchase of Manchester United F.C. by Malcolm Glazer in 2005.

The sale price of the Dodgers was considered to be far higher than what the team was actually worth at the time of sale. Estimates made by Forbes placed the value of the Dodgers at approximately $1.4 billion, and the winning bid was more than 30% higher than the next highest bid.

On April 13, the sale was approved by the bankruptcy court. McCourt separately sold the land surrounding the stadium for $150 million to the same group, while maintaining some economic interest in the property. The new ownership pays $14 million to rent the parking lots surrounding Dodger Stadium from an entity half-owned by McCourt. The sale officially closed on May 1, 2012.
