= TWG Motorsports =

American motorsports company

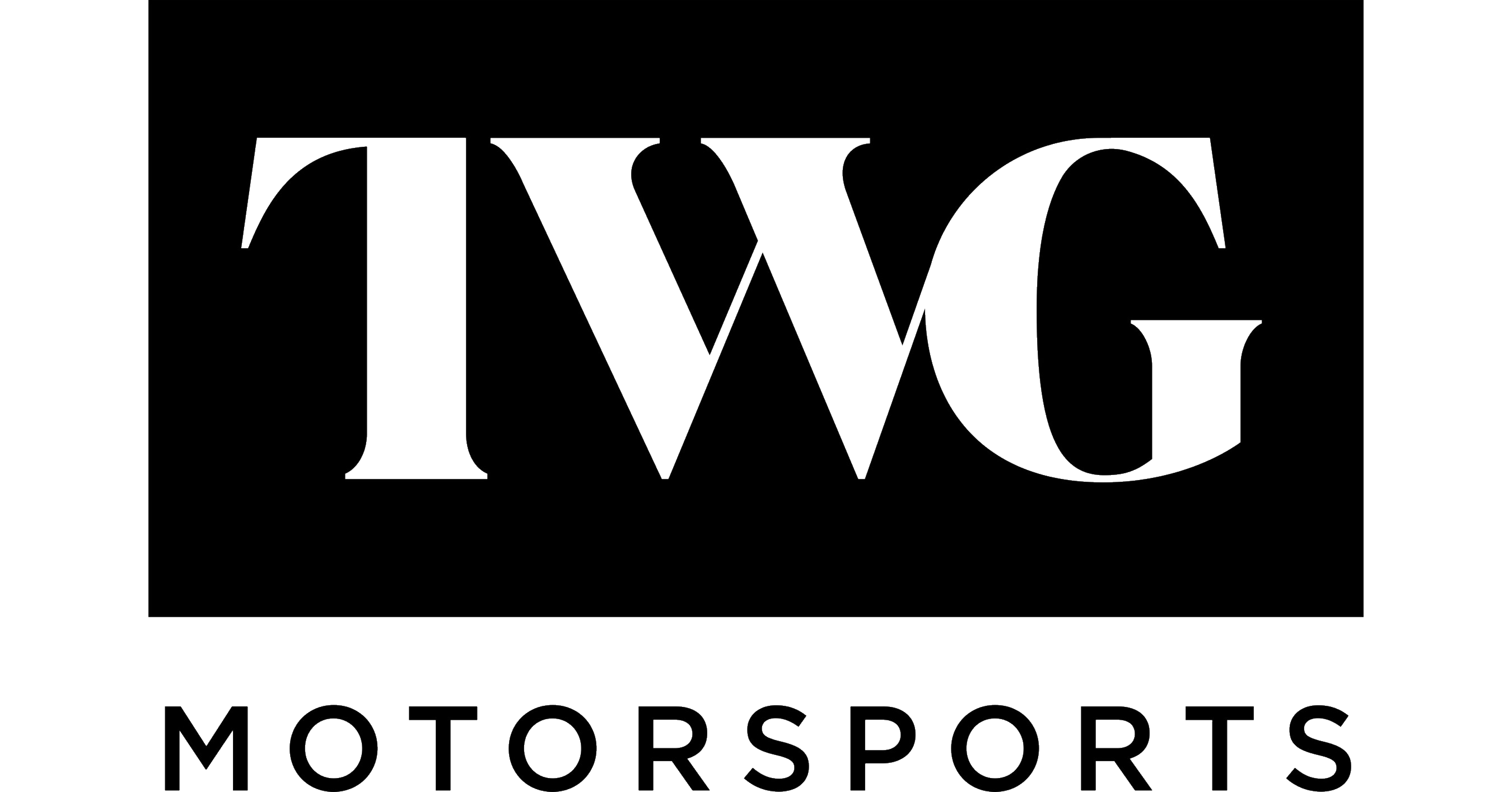
- Type: Subsidiary
- Industry: Motorsport
- Founded: November 2024; 21 months ago
- Founder: Mark Walter; Thomas Tull
- Headquarters: 227 West Monroe Suite 4800, Chicago, Illinois 60606
- Key people: Dan Towriss (CEO); Jill Gregory (COO); Doug Duchardt (CPO); Mark Walter (Co-Chairman); Thomas Tull (Co-Chairman)
- Products: Motorsport
- Parent: TWG Global
- Subsidiaries: Andretti Global; TWG Cadillac Formula 1 Team Ltd. (in partnership with General Motors); Spire Motorsports; Walkinshaw TWG Racing; Wayne Taylor Racing
- Website: twgmotorsports.com

TWG Motorsports is a motorsport division of American holding company TWG Global Holdings, LLC. The division's sole responsibility is to operate TWG Global's motorsport teams. The company was established in late 2024 and is based in Chicago, Illinois, United States.

They own and operate five motorsports teams across multiple racing disciplines: Andretti Global, Cadillac Formula 1 Team, Spire Motorsports, Walkinshaw TWG Racing, and Wayne Taylor Racing.

== History ==
In February 2025, TWG Global Holdings, LLC announced the official launch of a new motorsports division within the company, TWG Motorsports. The new division was originally founded in late 2024 by TWG Global co-chairs Mark Walter and Thomas Tull. The company also announced on the same day that Group 1001 Insurance CEO Dan Towriss would be serving as the chief executive officer of TWG Motorsports, and that veteran motorsports executive Jill Gregory would serve as the chief operating officer of the company. Doug Duchardt, who has two decades of motorsports experience with Hendrick Motorsports, Chip Ganassi Racing and Spire Motorsports, serves as the company's chief performance officer (CPO).

TWG Motorsports' portfolio comprises five motorsports organizations: Andretti Global, TWG Cadillac Formula 1 Team Ltd., Spire Motorsports, Walkinshaw TWG Racing, and Wayne Taylor Racing.

== Formula One ==
TWG Motorsports has a partnership with General Motors (GM) and subsidiary brand Cadillac to field the Cadillac Formula 1 Team. The team will enter the 2026 Formula One World Championship as a constructor in 2026 under the Cadillac brand, and GM will enter as an engine supplier at a later date. The team was originally entered as Andretti Cadillac under the leadership of Andretti Global, however, they were initially rejected by the Formula One Group despite having approval from the FIA. In November 2024, TWG Global co-chair and Guggenheim Partners CEO Mark Walter announced that he had purchased Andretti Global through his holding company TWG Global. The F1 team was also subsequently accepted by the Formula One Group to enter and compete in the 2026 Formula One World Championship. Dan Towriss was announced to be the CEO of the new team, Michael Andretti remained an advisor, and Mario Andretti would serve on the board of directors.
