= Towriss =

Towriss is a French surname, predominantly found in the United Kingdom and Canada. People with the surname include:

- Brian Towriss (born May 24, 1956), former Canadian football coach of the University of Saskatchewan
- Dan Towriss (b. 1972), American businessman and CEO of Group 1001
