= TWG Global =

American multinational conglomerate holding company

TWG Global Holdings, LLC
- Type: Private
- Industry: Conglomerate
- Founded: May 2024; 2 years ago in Chicago, Illinois, United States
- Founders: Mark Walter
- Headquarters: New York City; Chicago
- Area served: Worldwide
- Key people: Mark Walter (CEO, and Co-Chairman); Thomas Tull (Co-Chairman); Amos Hochstein (Managing Partner)
- Subsidiaries: TWG Global subsidiaries
- Website: twgglobal.com

TWG Global Holdings, LLC is an American multinational conglomerate holding company with headquarters in New York City and Chicago. The corporation is led by Guggenheim Partners co-founder and CEO Mark Walter and investor and corporate executive Thomas Tull. It is sometimes referred to as the Mark Walter Group, or the The Walter Group in media reports, but is not related to the Canadian company called the Walter Group.

== History ==
TWG Global was founded by Guggenheim Partners co-founder and CEO Mark Walter as an investment vehicle and holdings company for his investments in multiple industries such as insurance, AI technologies, sports, entertainment, corporate finance, and more. Walter owns 21% of the company as of November 2024. Thomas Tull joined the group as co-chairman in 2025, after running AI and machine learning focused holding group Tulco.

TWG is a conglomerate invested in seven different industries which include; financial services, insurance, artificial intelligence and other technology, sports and entertainment, energy and merchant banking.

== Artificial intelligence ==
TWG Global was created to form partnerships and make investments in artificial intelligence.

In February 2025, TWG Global became one of six founding corporate members in the Generative AI Impact Consortium at MIT. In March 2025, TWG Global partnered with Palantir Technologies to create commercial AI tools for financial services companies. In May 2025, xAI joined the partnership with TWG and Palantir.

== Financial services ==
TWG owns multiple financial services companies under its subsidiary Delaware Life Holdings, LLC, including Group 1001 Insurance and Guggenheim Partners (Guggenheim Investments and Guggenheim Securities).

In April 2025, Abu Dhabi sovereign wealth fund Mubadala Investment Company and TWG Global formed a partnership, with TWG Global purchasing a 5% stake of Mubadala Capital and Mubadala Capitala committing a $10 billion syndicated investment in TWG Global.

== Sports ==
In 2012, Guggenheim Baseball Management bought the Los Angeles Dodgers of the Major League Baseball for $2.15 billion. In 2014, Sparks LA Sports bought the Los Angeles Sparks of the Women's National Basketball Association.

In 2022, BlueCo bought Chelsea F.C. of the Premier League. In 2023, BlueCo bought RC Strasbourg Alsace of the Ligue 1.

In 2025, Walter bought a majority stake of the Los Angeles Lakers of the National Basketball Association at a $10 billion team valuation.

=== Motorsports ===
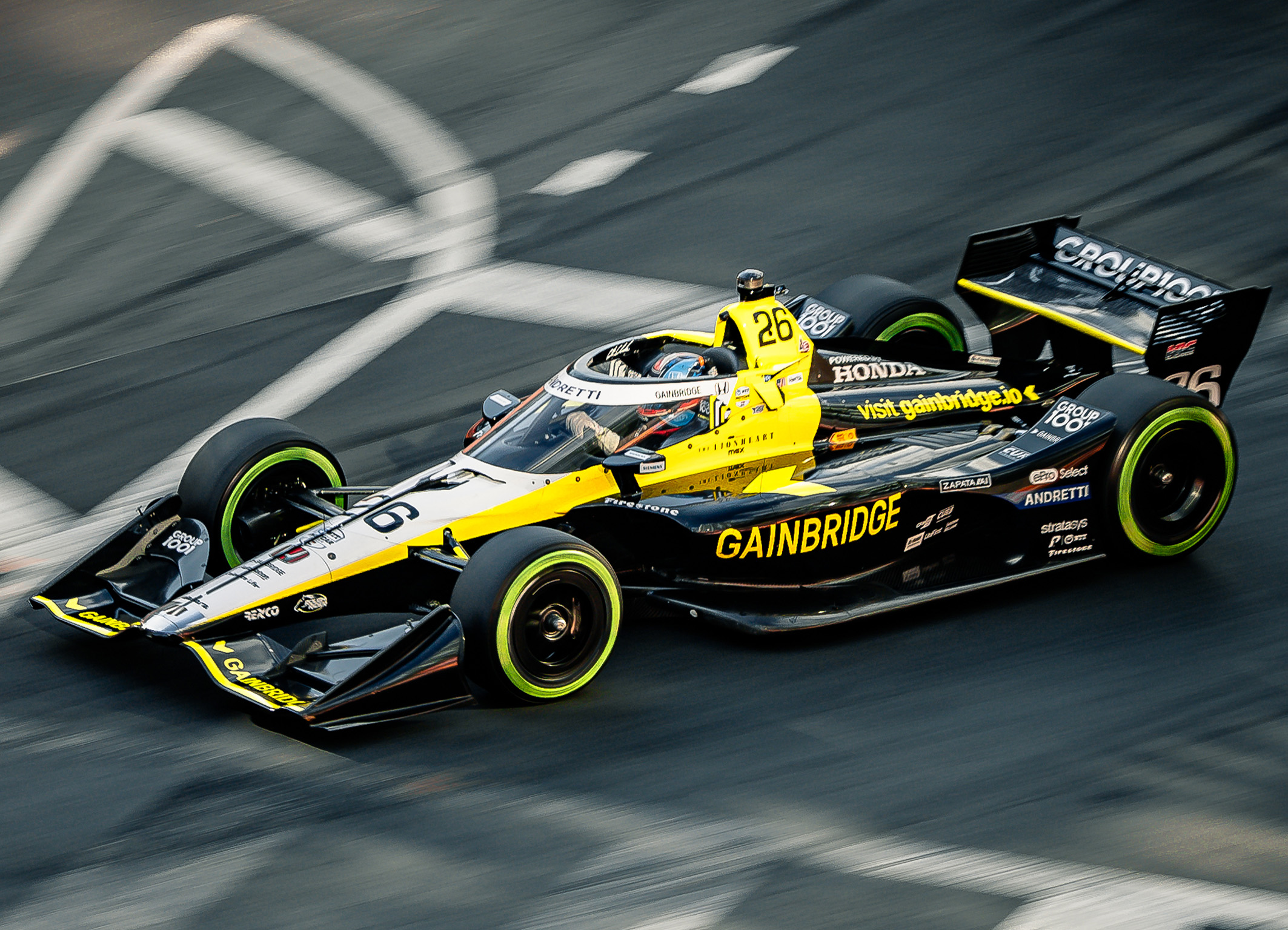
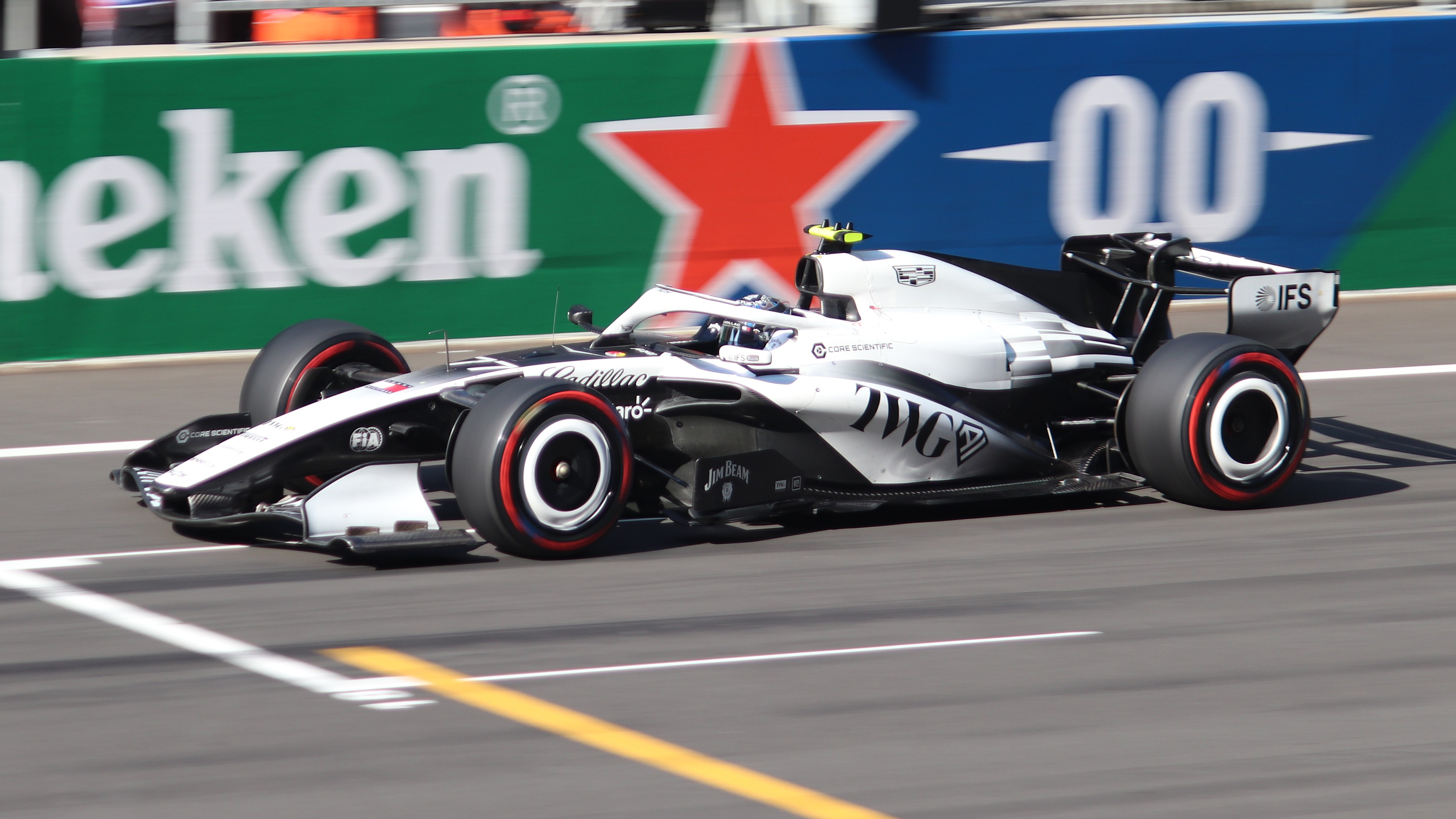
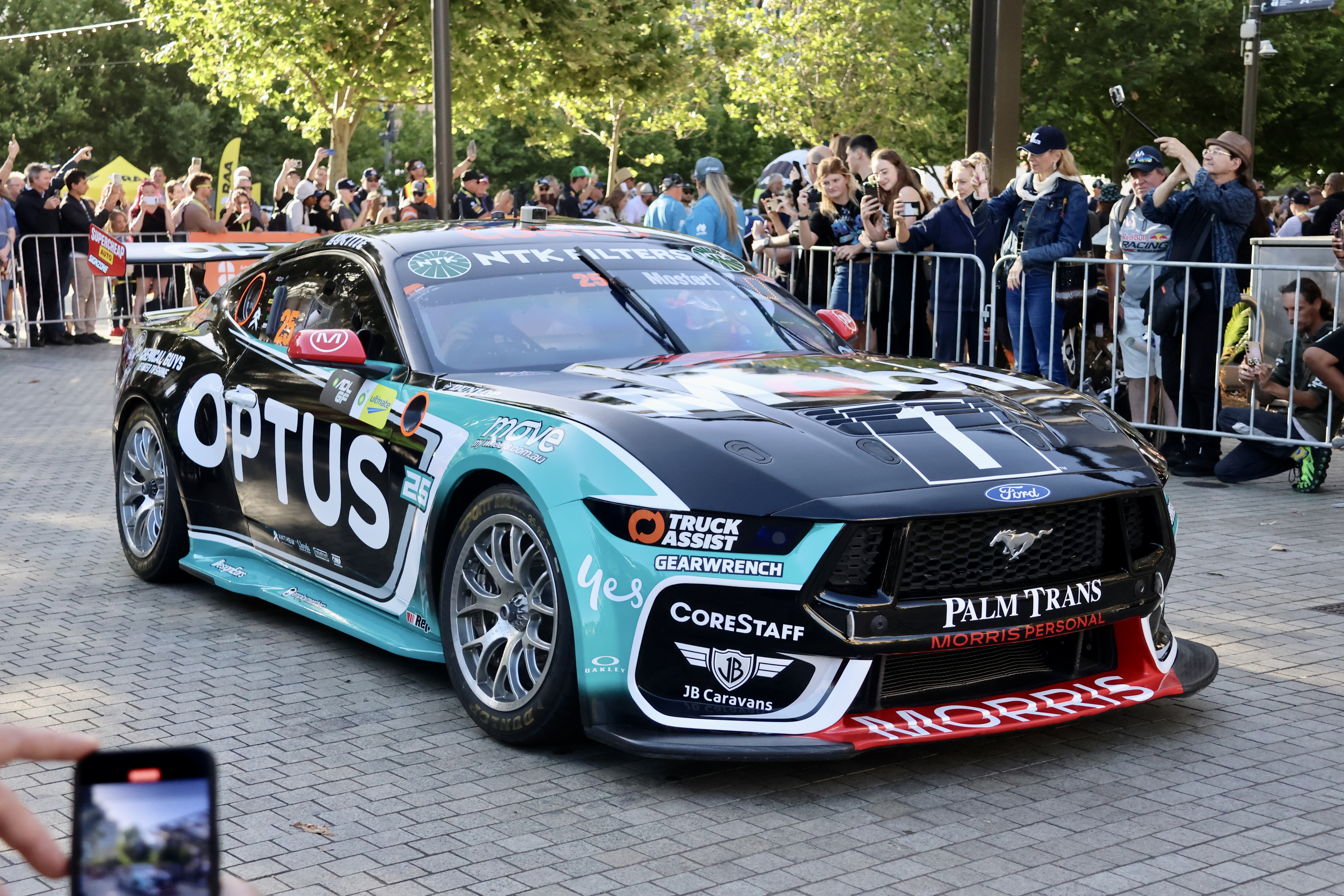
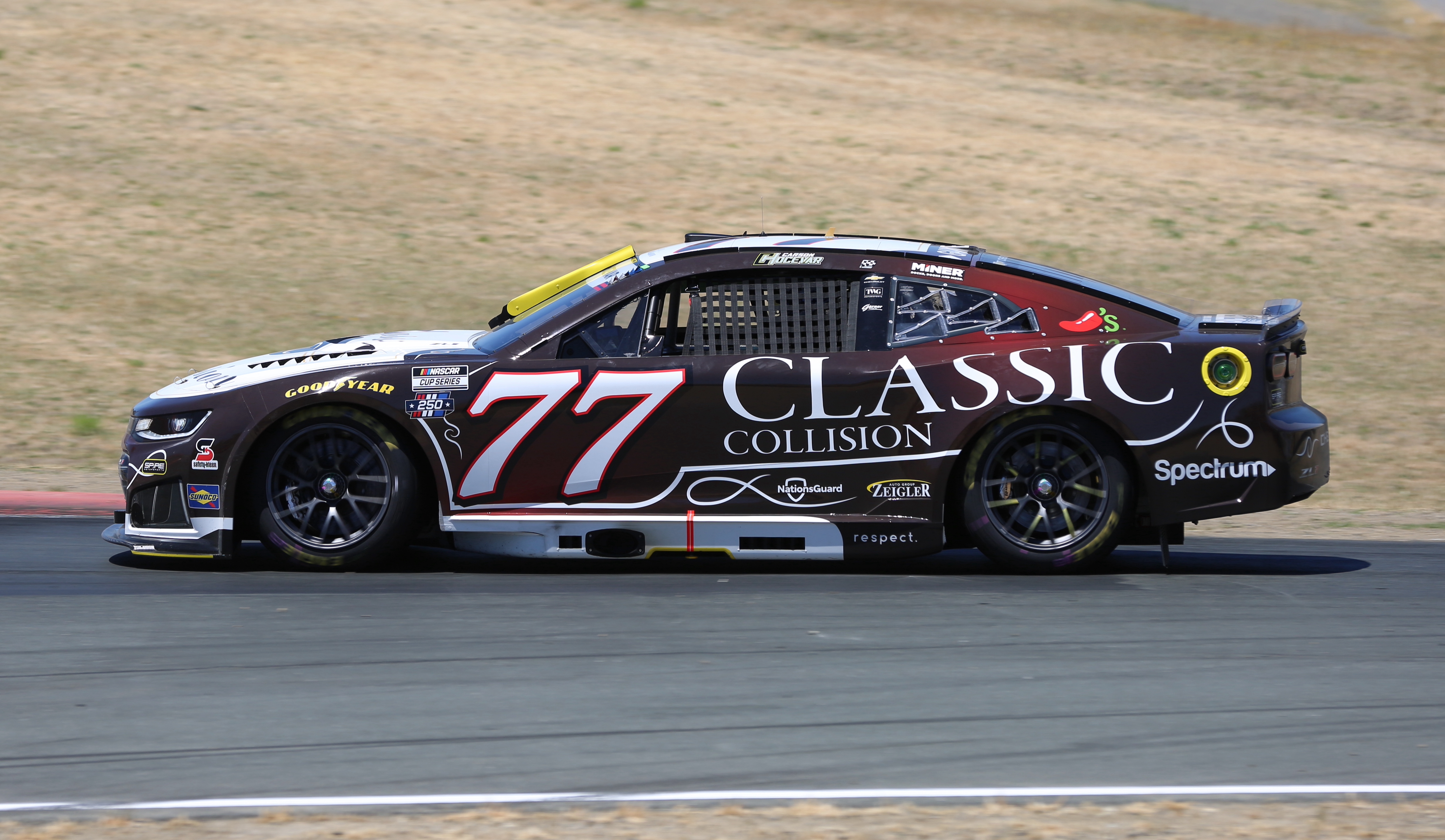
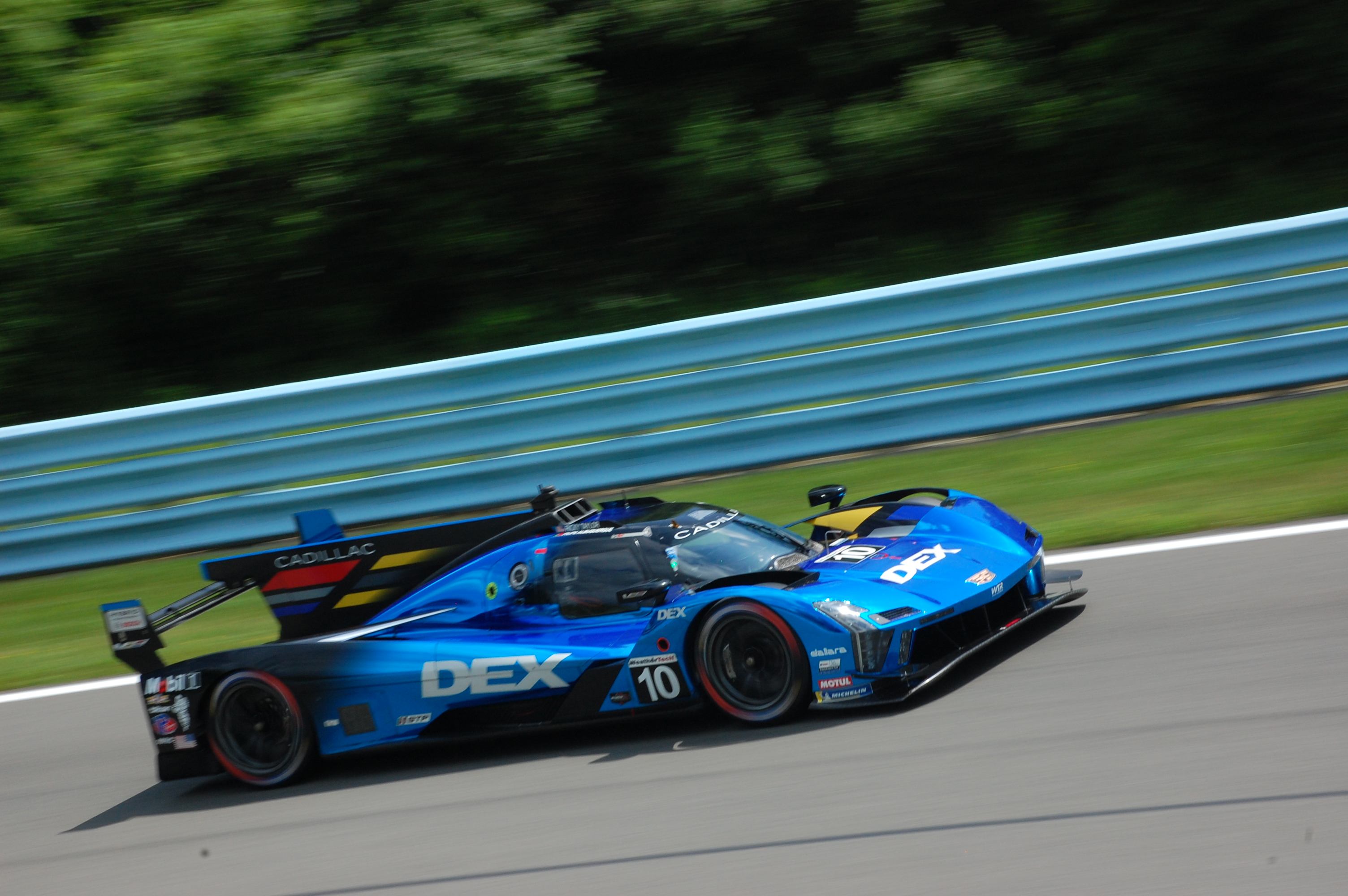
All of TWG's Motorsport umbrella.

TWG announced in November 2024, that it had acquired full ownership of American auto racing team Andretti Global. The acquisition included the then named Andretti Cadillac Formula 1 team, which at the time, had not been given approval to compete in the 2026 Formula One World Championship by the Formula One Group. Later that month, TWG announced that it had been approved by the Formula One Group to compete in 2026 under a new restructured team known as the Cadillac Formula 1 Team.

On February 26, 2025, TWG Global announced the formation of a subsidiary known as TWG Motorsports to run TWG Global's motorsports organizations. Alongside this announcement they revealed that NASCAR team Spire Motorsports and IMSA team Wayne Taylor Racing were now also under their ownership. Dan Towriss, CEO of Guggenheim subsidiary Group 1001, was named the organization's CEO.

TWG Motorsports will lead the Cadillac Formula 1 Team with General Motors, after Michael Andretti stepped down from the program at the end of 2024. TWG Motorsports along with General Motors formed TWG GM Performance Power Units LLC in 2025, an operation that will be the official power unit supplier for Formula 1's Cadillac team in the 2029 season and onwards.

== Subsidiaries and affiliates ==
=== Financial Services & Merchant Banking ===
- Guggenheim Partners
- Guggenheim Investments
- Guggenheim Securities
- Mubadala Capital

=== Insurance ===
- Group 1001 Insurance
- Delaware Life
- Clear Spring Life & Annuity Company
- Clear Spring Property & Casualty Group
- Gainbridge
- RVI Group

=== Sports, Media, & Entertainment ===
==== North America ====
- 20 Majors, LLC / Nicklaus Companies (Golf design, lifestyle licensing, and real estate brands including Jack Nicklaus and Golden Bear)
- Andretti Global (Motorsports teams competing in INDYCAR, INDY NXT, and Formula E)
- Billie Jean King Cup (The World Cup of Tennis)
- Cadillac Formula 1 Team / TWG Motorsports
- Los Angeles Dodgers (MLB)
- Los Angeles Lakers (NBA)
- Los Angeles Sparks (WNBA)
- Professional Women's Hockey League (PWHL)
- Spire Motorsports (NASCAR racing team)
- Teton Ridge (Western lifestyle, events, and culture media group)
- Wayne Taylor Racing (IMSA WeatherTech Sports Car team)

==== Other ====
- Chelsea F.C. (Premier League)
- Walkinshaw Andretti United (Australia's Supercar Championship team)

=== AI, Technology, & Energy ===
- TWG AI (Proprietary embedded intelligence platform)
- Plus Power (Renewable energy and grid-scale battery storage developer)
- UP.Partners (Strategic relationship investing in physical AI, robotics, and advanced transportation)
