= Dan Towriss =

American businessman (born 1972)

- Born: Daniel Jonathan Towriss; July 1972 (age 54); Muncie, Indiana, U.S.
- Education: Indiana University Bloomington; Ball State University (BS)
- Occupation: Businessman
- Known for: Founder and CEO of Group 1001; CEO of TWG Motorsports
- Spouse: Cassidy Towriss

Daniel Jonathan Towriss (born July 1972) is an American businessman who is the founder, chief executive officer and president of Group 1001, a privately held insurance collective and financial services firm, which is a subsidiary of TWG Global and affiliated with Guggenheim Partners. He is also the CEO of TWG Motorsports which owns Cadillac Formula 1 and the Andretti Global IndyCar team.

== Education ==
Towriss attended Muncie Central High School in Muncie, Indiana. After graduating he went to Indiana University Bloomington on a baseball scholarship. After experiencing an elbow injury which ended his baseball career, he went to Ball State University where he graduated with a Bachelor's of Science degree in actuarial science in 1994.

== Career ==
Towriss is the founder, CEO, and president of Group 1001, an insurance collective and financial services firm controlled by TWG Global, which is linked to Guggenheim Partners through their shared CEO Mark Walter. Towriss has helped Group 1001 accumulate over $66 billion in assets.

On February 25, 2025, he was named the CEO of TWG Motorsports, a subsidiary of TWG Global. TWG Motorsports owns Cadillac Formula One, previously known as Andretti Cadillac Formula One Team. In October 2024, Michael Andretti had given control of Andretti Global to Towriss. Towriss had joined Andretti's ownership group in May 2023. The Cadillac team will become the 11th team during the 2026 season.

== Personal life ==
On October 10, 2020, Towriss married Cassidy Rudman.

Shortly after midnight on December 31, 2019, he was involved in a boat crash near Fort Lauderdale, Florida. He was driving his 42-foot boat at a high speed when it crashed into a fishing jetty. He was ejected from the boat and sustained serious injuries along with his fellow passengers, Jarret and Lauren Silagy, and his future wife, Cassidy. Lauren Silagy underwent major brain surgeries and a knee surgery due to the crash. As a result of the crash, the Silagys sued Towriss for $100 million. They alleged that he had consumed two to three bottles of wine and another cocktail on the night of the boat crash. He also received five misdemeanor criminal charges.

== Charity ==
Towriss is on the board of three non-profit organizations, the Cal Ripken Jr. Foundation; RISE, an organization which seeks to promote social justice in sports; and Indy Women in Tech. In February 2024, he donated $2 million to build the Muncie YMCA on the campus of his former high school, the Muncie Central High School.
