= Transparent Value =

Division of Guggenheim specializing in management of mutual funds & managed accounts

Transparent Value is a division of Guggenheim Partners specializing in the management of equity mutual funds and separately managed accounts. The firm is headquartered in New York City.

== History ==
Transparent Value was founded in 2003 by Julian Koski and Armen Arus. In May 2009 Guggenheim Partners acquired Transparent Value.

== Investment Methodology ==
Transparent Value developed the Required Business Performance (RBP) Methodology. The methodology uses fundamental analysis and elements of quantitative finance to select stocks. Analysts use a reverse discounted cash flow analysis to determine the performance implied by the stock price. This performance is called the Required Business Performance. Using historical performance, analysts then calculate the probability the company will deliver this performance. This probability is called Required Business Performance Probability.

The methodology was licensed to Dow Jones Indexes and serves as the basis for the Dow Jones RBP Indexes.

== Mutual Funds ==
Transparent Value currently offers seven mutual funds based on the Dow Jones RBP Style Series, Dow Jones RBP Directional Series and Dow Jones RBP Dividend Series. The first funds were launched in May 2010.
