= Palisadian-Post =

Newspaper in Pacific Palisades, California

- Type: Weekly newspaper
- Owner(s): Laura and Tim Schneider
- Founder: Telford Work
- Editor: Sarah Shmerling
- Founded: May 4, 1928
- Ceased publication: December 11, 2025
- Relaunched: May 4, 2026
- Language: English
- Headquarters: 21201 Victory Boulevard, Canoga Park, CA 91303
- City: Pacific Palisades, California
- Website: palipost.com

The Palisadian-Post is a bi-weekly subscription newspaper serving Pacific Palisades, California, published every other Thursday until it ceased publication in 2025. The paper was founded in 1928 and was owned by Alan Smolinisky. After closing, Laura and Tim Schneider acquired the Palisadian-Post and relaunched it in May 2026, on the newspaper’s 98th anniversary.

== History ==
The community of Pacific Palisades was founded in early 1922 by Methodists who migrated west. In September 1924, the fledgling Methodist-based community's governing body, the Pacific Palisades Association, began publishing a monthly news sheet known as the Progress. It was by Thomas R. Gettys.

On May 4, 1928, Telford Work published the first edition of The Palisadian, a twelve-page weekly tabloid. Work was a graduate of the University of Southern California who operated the Selma Enterprise for six years and a small chain of five papers in Fresno and Tulare counties. Work moved to Palisades two years prior to work as director of public relations for the Pacific Palisades Association.

In 1934, Clifford D. Clearwater assumed control of the paper. He was one of the first settlers of Pacific Palisades and published The Palisadian until his death in 1956. His widow Zola Clearwater ran the paper for a few years until selling it in 1960 to twin brothers Charles B. Brown and William W. Brown, owners of the rival Pacific Palisades Post. The two papers were then consolidated.

In August 1981, the Browns sold the Palisadian-Post, North Shore Mail and Brentwood Post to Small Newspapers of Kankakee, Illinois. Around that time the circulation was 4,100. The Small family operated the paper until December 2012, when they sold it to real estate entrepreneur Alan Smolinisky.

After the sale, editor Bill Bruns announced his plans to retire at the end of the year. He had worked at the Post for two decades. Instead, Smolinisky laid off Bruns and five other journalists. He also let go at least four office workers, shut down the printing press and sold the office building for $3 million. Printing from then on was outsourced.

In April 2023, the paper reduced its print schedule from once a week to once every two weeks. In December 2025, the paper ceased publication, mainly due to complications associated with the Palisades Fire earlier that year. The Post published its final issue on December 11, 2025. In early 2026, Laura and Tim Schneider bought the paper and relaunched it on May 4, 2026. The new Post is online only, with the couple hoping to someday bring back the physical print edition.
