= Thomas Tull =

American film producer

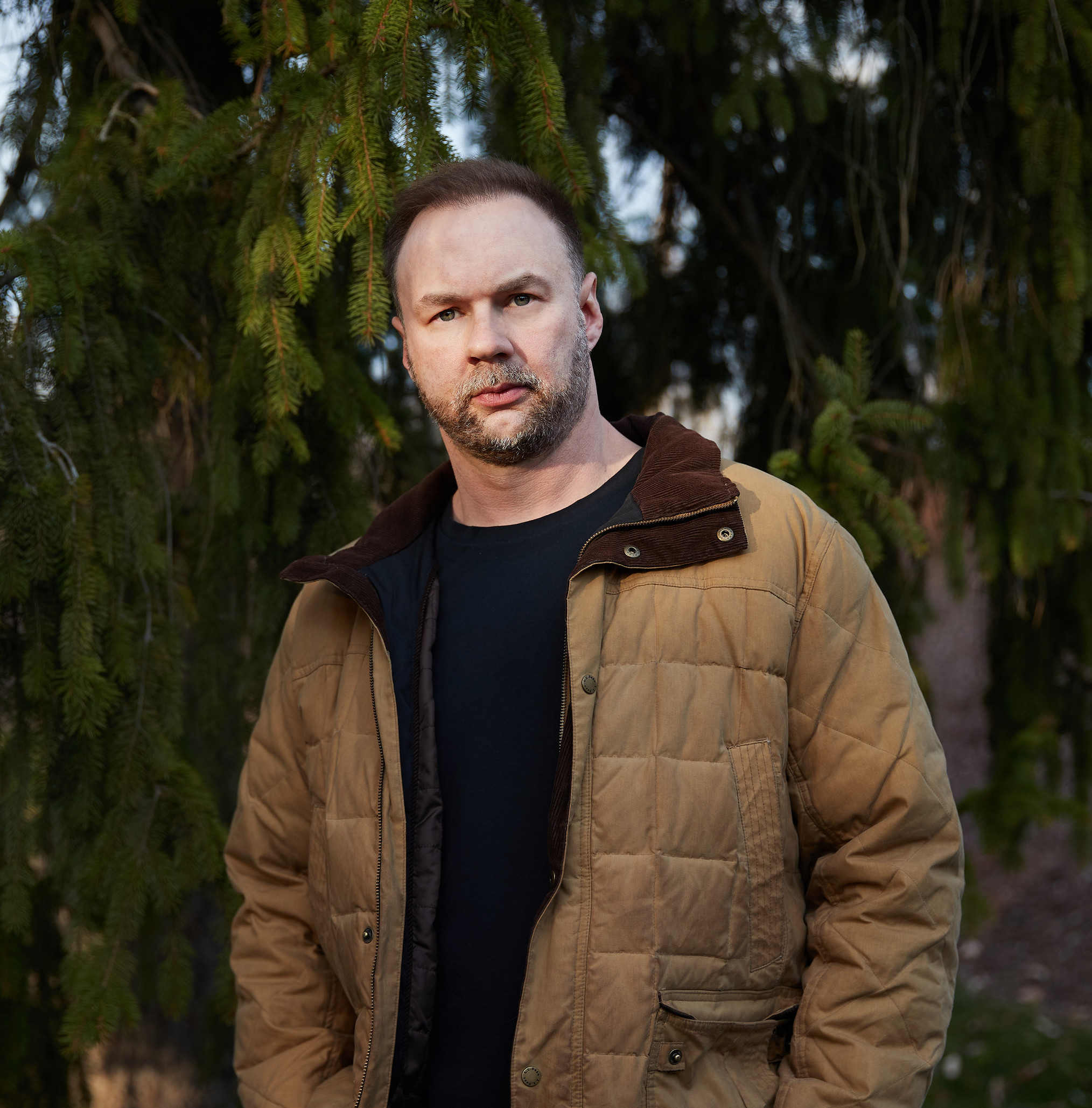
- Tull in 2021
- Born: Thomas J. Tull; June 9, 1970 (age 56); Endwell, New York, U.S.
- Education: Hamilton College
- Occupations: Film producer; entrepreneur; businessman
- Years active: 2003–present

Thomas J. Tull (born June 9, 1970) is an American billionaire businessman, entrepreneur, and film producer. He is co-chairman of TWG Global, a holding group where he is developing investments using artificial intelligence and other technologies to guide investing. He is the former chairman and chief executive officer (CEO) of Legendary Entertainment and Tulco LLC. As of January 2026, he is worth approximately US$5.3 billion.

== Early life ==
Tull grew up in Endwell, New York, the son of a dental hygienist single mother. As a youth, Tull was an athlete, playing baseball and football. Tull graduated from Hamilton College in 1992.

== Career ==
=== Early career ===
After college, Tull abandoned plans to become a lawyer and instead went into business, starting a chain of laundromats. Among his innovations were different prices according to demand at different times of day. Tull next went into the field of financing, buying and selling several tax and accounting offices. He later became chief of operations of Tax Services of America. His business was buying units from franchisees of Jackson Hewitt Tax Services rolling up and consolidating operations. This group of former independent franchisees was eventually sold back to Jackson Hewitt. People who had established franchised locations often preferred being salaried managers. In 2001, Tull left Interactive Technology Funds to join the Convex Group, an Atlanta-based investment group. His firm invested in entertainment, where Tull began to learn the entertainment business. After discussing the potential of private equity with a film executive in 2003, Tull quit Convex, raising $600 million in equity to finance the production of movies under the Legendary Pictures banner.

=== Legendary Entertainment ===
Tull founded Legendary Entertainment in 2005, along with Jon Jashni, Larry Clark, William Fay and Scott Mednick, becoming the CEO and chairman. The company entered into a partnership with Warner Bros. that same year to jointly finance and produce films. In 2009, Tull became the majority shareholder of Legendary, in a buyout of the original investors. The Warner deal was followed by a similar deal with Universal Studios in 2013. He also helped produce the film Blackhat. Legendary was one of the first film production companies to use technology and data analytics to improve the way movies are marketed. Shortly after starting Legendary, Tull built a new analytics division within the company, which uses data to improve marketing decisions, in addition to other key decisions.

Tull comments at the 42 film workshop in the State Dining Room of the White House, April 2013.

In January 2016, Legendary was acquired by the Wanda Cultural Industry Group for $3.5 billion, with Tull retaining a 20% stake. One year later, in January 2017, Tull left the company.

Tull describes himself as a "fanboy" of comics, and several of the films produced by Legendary were personal favorites of Tull, including Watchmen, 300, and The Dark Knight. Watchmen had been in "development hell" for years when Tull arranged to pick up the rights. 300 had been turned down by other studios. Tull also describes himself as a "gamer", and co-founded the short-lived Brash Entertainment to work on film-to-video game conversions. Other major films include Inception, The Hangover and its sequels, Man of Steel, and others.

=== Tulco ===
In 2017, Tull founded Tulco, LLC, a Pittsburgh-based privately held holding company. Tulco invests in companies in large industries and helps its portfolio companies apply technology such as artificial intelligence, machine learning and predictive data analytics. Among Tulco’s investments is Acrisure, an insurance broker that acquired Tulco’s AI insurance business in July 2020 for $400 million.

=== USIT ===
In 2022, Tull started fundraising as the new head of the United States Innovative Technology (USIT) Fund, focusing on start-up companies and industries including AI, quantum computing and cybersecurity, space technology including satellites, and biotech. The fund's investments have included Anduril Industries, which was founded by Palmer Luckey, and Capella Space, which are two companies building satellites with the capability to take images at night and through cloud cover.

Tull has been a consistent investor in Colossal Biosciences, which aims to resurrect the Dodo bird and Woolly mammoth from extinction. Shield AI, an AI-powered drone manufacturer, has also received multiple investments from Tull and USIT.

=== TWG Global ===
In 2025, Tull became co-chairman of TWG Global, a new investment group founded by Mark Walter, working to build AI capabilities across multiple industries, including financial services. Tull will bring his own investments to the group including his portfolio of biotech, defense and media investments. Tull has helped form partnerships to develop AI capabilities in the firm, including with Palantir and XAI.

=== Other investments ===
Tull has also invested in a variety of other AI and data science-driven companies including Luvos, Genies, Oculus, and Zoox.

== Philanthropy and board membership ==
Tull has donated US$1 million to Priorities USA Action, a Super PAC supporting Democratic presidential candidate Hillary Clinton. Tull has also supported Republican causes, such as the Senate Leadership Fund, a super PAC for Senate Republicans. He founded the Tull Family Foundation, which has supported a number of causes in the youth, health, and education spaces including the National Little League, a donation of $4.2 million worth of personal protective equipment (PPE) during the COVID-19 pandemic, a donation to the Children's Hospital of Pittsburgh Foundation towards pediatric research and art therapy programs, and a grant to the University of Pittsburgh towards brain cancer research.

He is a member of MIT School of Engineering Dean’s Advisory Council, and is also noted as an advisor to the chief innovation and strategy officer and Visiting Innovation Scholar MIT.

He is a member of the board of trustees of Carnegie Mellon University, Yellowstone Forever, and the Baseball Hall of Fame Board of Directors. Tull was appointed a visiting scholar of innovation at the MIT School of Engineering beginning April 1, 2022.

In October 2025, through the Teton Ridge Ranch Foundation, Tull committed $1.5 million over three years to support the Teton County Sheriff’s Foundation in Idaho to assist with hiring and retaining deputies, expanding training, and modernizing emergency response capabilities.

In November 2025, the Tull Family Foundation made a large in-kind donation to the Greater Pittsburgh Community Food Bank, providing food equivalent to approximately 150,000 meals to individuals and families across Western Pennsylvania.

== Personal life ==
He resides in Edgeworth, Pennsylvania, with his wife, Alba Tull, and their children. They previously lived in Thousand Oaks, California. In January 2018, the 33-plus-acre Thousand Oaks compound was listed for $85 million.

Tull has been a fan of the Pittsburgh Steelers since age four and in 2009 became a part-owner of the team. He also owns a minority stake in the New York Yankees.

He is a founder and member of the American rock and Southern soul band Ghost Hounds, in which he plays guitar.

Tull is a member of the Board of Governors for the Naismith Basketball Hall of Fame.

== Filmography ==
=== Film ===
Executive producer

- Superman Returns (2006)
- The Ant Bully (2006)
- Beerfest (2006)
- We Are Marshall (2006)
- 300 (2006)
- Trick 'r Treat (2007)
- 10,000 BC (2008)
- The Dark Knight (2008)
- Watchmen (2009)
- Observe and Report (2009)
- The Hangover (2009)
- Where the Wild Things Are (2009)
- Ninja Assassin (2009)
- Clash of the Titans (2010)
- Jonah Hex (2010)
- Inception (2010)
- The Town (2010)
- Due Date (2010)
- Sucker Punch (2011)
- The Hangover Part II (2011)
- Wrath of the Titans (2012)
- The Dark Knight Rises (2012)
- Jack the Giant Slayer (2013)
- The Hangover Part III (2013)
- Man of Steel (2013)
- 300: Rise of an Empire (2014)
- Dracula Untold (2014)
- Interstellar (2014)
- Unbroken (2014)
- Jurassic World (2015)
- Straight Outta Compton (2015)
- Dune (2021)
- Dune: Part Two (2024)

Producer

- It Might Get Loud (2008)
- Comic-Con Episode IV: A Fan's Hope (2011)
- 42 (2013)
- Pacific Rim (2013)
- Godzilla (2014)
- As Above, So Below (2014)
- Seventh Son (2014)
- Blackhat (2015)
- Crimson Peak (2015)
- Krampus (2015)
- Warcraft (2016)
- Spectral (2016)
- The Great Wall (2016); co-produced with Charles Roven, Jon Jashni and Peter Loehr
- Kong: Skull Island (2017)
- Pacific Rim: Uprising (2018)
- Godzilla: King of the Monsters (2019)
- Godzilla vs. Kong (2021)
- Godzilla x Kong: The New Empire (2024)
- Godzilla x Kong: Supernova (2027)

As an actor

Year	Film	Role	Notes
2012	The Dark Knight Rises	Gotham Rogues Owner	Uncredited
2013	Pacific Rim	Cameo	Uncredited

=== Television ===
Year	Title	Credit	Notes
2017−19	Make It Work	Executive producer	Documentary
2019−2023	Carnival Row	Co-executive producer	
2023−	Monarch: Legacy of Monsters	Producer	

As an actor

Year	Title	Role
2017	Stranger Things	Man on Street
