= Guggenheim Baseball Management =

Los Angeles Dodgers ownership group

Guggenheim Baseball Management is the ownership group of the Los Angeles Dodgers professional baseball team. The consortium consists of Guggenheim Partners controlling partner Mark Walter and basketball Hall of Famer Magic Johnson, movie producer Peter Guber, baseball team executive Stan Kasten, and investors Bobby Patton and Todd Boehly as minority partners. Billie Jean King and her partner Ilana Kloss joined the Los Angeles Dodgers ownership group in 2018. Entrepreneurs Alan Smolinisky and Robert L. Plummer joined the ownership group in September 2019.

== Background and history ==
In the late 1990s Rupert Murdoch's Fox Entertainment Group bought the Dodgers from the team's longtime owners, the O’Malley family. Fox sold the team in 2004 to Frank McCourt, a Boston real estate developer. Bud Selig, Major League Baseball's commissioner at the time, later accused McCourt of saddling the Dodgers with debt and dipping into team funds to pay for personal expenses.

In April 2011 Selig announced that MLB would be appointing a representative to oversee the day-to-day operations of the Dodgers. His statement said that he took that action because of his "deep concerns for the finances and operations" of the Dodgers. This event occurred shortly after an LA Times report that McCourt had obtained a personal loan from Fox to cover the team's payroll for April and May. McCourt vigorously disputed MLB's actions. Nevertheless, Selig appointed former diplomat and former Texas Rangers executive Tom Schieffer to oversee the Dodgers' finances. On June 27, the Dodgers filed for Chapter 11 Bankruptcy protection.

After much legal wrangling between McCourt's lawyers and MLB lawyers in bankruptcy court, he reached a deal with the league to put the team up for sale.

There were three final bidders for the team: Stan Kroenke, a St. Louis real-estate developer already owned the then-St. Louis Rams NFL football team, the Denver Nuggets NBA basketball team, the Colorado Avalanche NHL hockey team, and the English soccer club Arsenal; hedge fund manager and future New York Mets owner Steve Cohen; and a group that originally included Todd Boehly and Mark Walter, the former president and current CEO of Guggenheim Partners, a Chicago-based global financial services company, and basketball hall of famer Magic Johnson.

Guggenheim Baseball Management, which included Boehly, Walter, and Johnson, was formed to acquire the team in March 2012 from McCourt.

On March 27, 2012, McCourt agreed to sell the team to Guggenheim Baseball Management for a record price of $2.15 billion, the highest ever paid for a professional sports team at the time. McCourt separately sold the land surrounding the stadium for $150 million to the same group, while maintaining some economic interest in the property. According to Guggenheim Baseball Management, McCourt will have no control or influence over the land, but will profit from potential future development of it. Also, the new ownership will pay $14 million to rent the parking lots surrounding Dodger Stadium from an entity half-owned by McCourt. The sale officially closed on May 1, 2012, ending McCourt's turbulent period as Dodgers owner.

== Television deal ==
On January 22, 2013, the Los Angeles Times reported that Time Warner Cable had signed a deal to partner with the Dodgers to form a new regional sports network, which would be majority-owned by the team.

On January 28 the Dodgers and Time Warner Cable signed a 25-year broadcast agreement valued at $8.35 billion, subject to the approval of Major League Baseball, which would see the establishment of a new channel known as SportsNet LA. The deal ended long-standing broadcast partnerships with Fox Sports West, which had aired Dodgers games on its Prime Ticket channel since 1997; and with KCAL-TV, an independent station which had been the Dodgers' over-the-air broadcast television outlet since 2006. TWC's winning bid exceeded Fox's bid by $2 billion and was worth $210 million for the inaugural 2014 season, or $1.5 million a game. That amount exceeded the revenues from Prime Ticket and KCAL-TV by more than four times. The agreement increased the number of games aired: nearly 100 games were carried in 2014 compared with the 49 games aired by Prime Ticket in 2013.

The Dodgers television deal has been controversial, with a distribution dispute that has locked out wide swaths of the Los Angeles television market. SportsNet LA has never been available to the majority of households in its service area. Carriage was most limited in the channel's inaugural 2014 season, when it was carried by Time Warner Cable systems in Los Angeles, Bright House Networks' system in Bakersfield, and Champion Broadband serving a small portion of the San Gabriel Valley. Together, these distributors covered only 30% of the market, leaving the remaining 70% without the channel. Coverage rose when Charter Communications added SportsNet LA in June 2015, but remains under 50 percent: about 1.8 million homes. DirecTV is the largest unsigned distributor. Since Charter's acquisition of TWC on September 20, 2016, SportsNet LA continues to only be carried by the former Charter, Time Warner Cable, and Bright House Networks systems in the region (which now operate as Spectrum). The team and Spectrum finally came to terms with DirecTV/U-verse TV to add the network before the 2020 season.

== Investors and executives ==
Guggenheim Baseball Management investors and executives include:

Mark Walter is the "controlling partner" of Guggenheim Baseball Management and the chairman of the Dodgers organization. He is the chief executive of Guggenheim Partners, an investment and advisory firm with more than $270 billion in assets under management. Based in New York and Chicago, the firm was founded in 1999 and is now a global investment and advisory financial services firm that engages in investment banking, asset management, capital markets services, and insurance services.

Todd Boehly was president of Guggenheim Partners until leaving in 2015, Boehly bought some of the assets he had collected at Guggenheim, including The Hollywood Reporter, Dick Clark Productions, and Security Benefit, to found Eldridge Industries, a private investment firm that specializes in providing both debt and equity capital. A graduate of the College of William & Mary, Mr. Boehly dealt in leveraged finance at Credit Suisse First Boston and high-yield investments at Whitney & Co. He joined Guggenheim in 2001 to lead its corporate-credit business.

Peter Guber is an American business executive, entrepreneur, educator and author. He is chairman and CEO of Mandalay Entertainment. Guber's films have grossed over $3 billion worldwide and received 50 Academy Award nominations.

Guber is also co-owner of four professional sports teams: the Golden State Warriors of the National Basketball Association (NBA), the Los Angeles Dodgers of Major League Baseball, Los Angeles FC of Major League Soccer, and the professional eSports organization aXiomatic Gaming, that acquired controlling interest in one of the world's premier esports team franchises, Team Liquid.

Stan Kasten is the former president of the Atlanta Braves and the Washington Nationals, and the current president and part-owner of the Los Angeles Dodgers. Long involved in Atlanta professional sports, he also served as general manager of the NBA's Atlanta Hawks and president of the NHL's Atlanta Thrashers.

A native of New Jersey, Kasten became the youngest NBA general manager in 1979 when he joined the Atlanta Hawks at age 27. In 1986, he took over as president of both the Hawks and Ted Turner's other franchise, the Atlanta Braves, where he stayed until 2003. He landed in Washington in 2006 as president of the Nationals franchise, stepping down after the 2010 season.

He has won two NBA Executive of the Year awards, three NBA division titles, and, with the Braves, 12 baseball division titles, five National League pennants and one World Series championship.

Robert (Bobby) Patton, Jr., is a partner of Guggenheim Baseball Management and became part-owner of the Los Angeles Dodgers on April 30, 2012. Patton principally operates oil and gas properties in Texas and Kansas and has additional investments in many other sectors, including ranching and insurance. He serves on the Board of Security Benefit Corporation and the advisory council of the University of Texas College of Liberal Arts. He also serves as the tournament chairman of the Dean & Deluca Invitational PGA Tour event at Colonial Country Club in Fort Worth, Texas. Patton received a B.B.A. from the University of Texas as well as a J.D. from St. Mary's University and LLM from Southern Methodist University. Patton resides in Fort Worth, where he was born and raised.
