= CardCash =

American online retail company

- Type: Private
- Industry: Consumer Products & Services
- Founded: 2009; 17 years ago
- Founder: Elliot Bohm; Marc Ackerman
- Headquarters: Brick, New Jersey, U.S.
- Area served: United States
- Key people: Elliot Bohm; (CEO); Marc Ackerman; (COO); Thomas Butt; (CTO/CIO)
- Services: Trading, gift cards
- Owner: Giftify (2024–present)
- Number of employees: 120
- Website: CardCash site

CardCash is an American company headquartered in Brick, New Jersey, that operates an online gift card marketplace where users can buy and sell discounted gift cards. It was co-founded in 2009 by CEO Elliot Bohm and COO Marc Ackerman.

In January 2024, it was announced that its acquisition had been completed by RDE (now Giftify), an American company that operates the website Restaurant.com.

== History ==
CardCash was created by Bohm and Ackerman after one holiday season when they were left with several unused gift cards, much like other consumers. In fact, a 2008 Consumer Reports survey found that a quarter of gift card recipients do not use the cards within a year and eventually lose them.

Before creating CardCash, Bohm made a living reselling discounted electronic devices and Ackerman worked in the real estate industry in Brooklyn.

From its humble origins, the company grew over the years to being cited in Forbes magazine, and in Inc.’s list of the fastest growing private companies in America.

Eight months after raising $6 million in equity funding from Guggenheim Partners, the firm acquired its Silicon Valley competitor Plastic Jungle in July 2014. Through this acquisition, CardCash now owns Plastic Jungle's technology infrastructure, business partnerships and domain name, PlasticJungle.com.

In October 2014, CardCash entered into a strategic partnership with Incomm Corporation. The relationship will allow CardCash to integrate its online gift card exchange with thousands of InComm's retail partner locations across the country CardCash has also signed deals with CVS, United Airlines and Walmart.

== Recognition ==
CardCash has been cited by multiple media outlets including Forbes, Inc. ABC, and Orlando Sentinel. It has been included on Forbes' list of America's Most Promising Companies for 2014 and also featured twice in Forbes and Inc.

In 2014, CardCash was included in the list of “Top Consumer Products & Services Companies” category and “Top Companies in New Jersey on the 2014 Inc. 5000”. In 2014, CEO Elliot Bohm was recognized as one “America's Most Promising CEOs Under 35.”

== See also ==
- Rebate card
- Gift card
