= Group 1001 =

US insurance and financial services group

- Company type: Subsidiary
- Industry: insurance; financial services
- Founded: 2013
- Founder: Dan Towriss
- Headquarters: 10555 Group 1001 Way, Zionsville, Indiana 46077
- Key people: Dan Towriss (CEO)
- Parent: TWG Global
- Website: Group 1001 Website

Group 1001 is an American insurance collective and financial services holding company with headquarters in Zionsville, Indiana. It is a subsidiary of TWG Global.

== History ==
The company was founded in 2013 by Dan Towriss, its current Chief Executive Officer. The company was originally founded as Delaware Life Holdings as an affiliate of Guggenheim Partners. On July 31, 2013, the company acquired Sun Life Insurance and Annuity Co. of New York.

In 2017, Delaware Life Holdings rebranded as Group 1001. The company has approximately $68 billion assets under management.

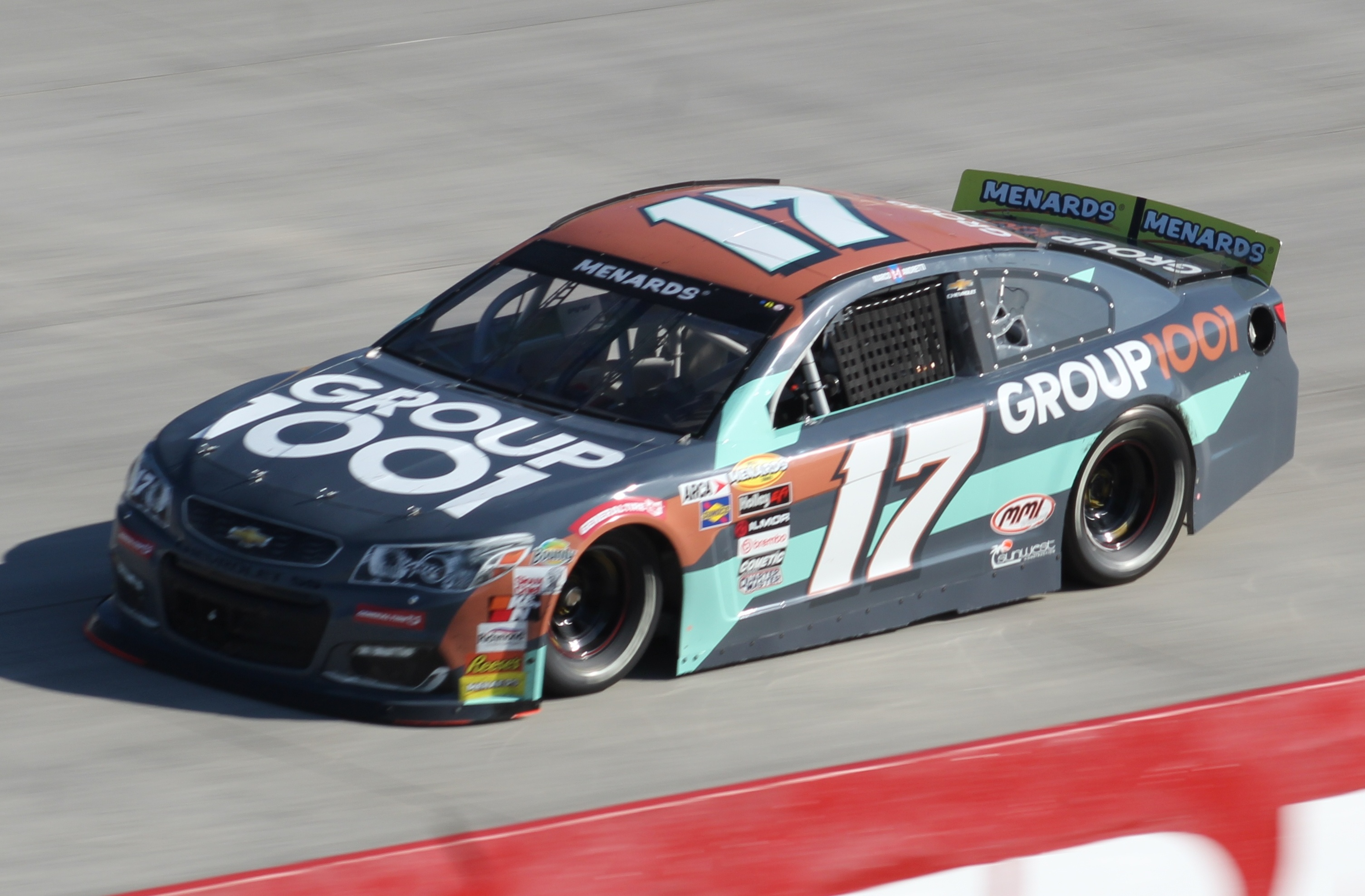
A Group 1001 sponsored race car.

In 2019, the company acquired Lackawanna Insurance Group. Later that year, the company also launched Gainbridge, its technology driven platform that allows for people to invest in an easier manner. In 2020, the company acquired RVI Group. In 2021, Guggenheim Life and Annuity Company was added as part of Group 1001 and, in 2022, was rebranded as Clear Spring Life and Annuity Company. In 2023, the company sold its subsidiary, the Delaware Life Insurance Company of New York, to Nassau Financial Group.

== Subsidiaries and affiliates ==
- Clear Spring Health
- Clear Spring Life & Annuity Company
- Clear Spring Property & Casualty Group
- Delaware Life Insurance
- Gainbridge
- RVI Group

== Partnerships ==
Group 1001 invests in strategic partnerships to connect with and transform communities through education and sports.

2024 Community Impact Report

== Ransomware attack class-action lawsuit ==
On February 9, 2023, the company sustained a ransomware attack. All of Group 1001's affiliated companies were effected by the attack, except for Gainbridge. The company's operations were restored by March 1, 2023.

As a result of the attack, a class-action suit was filed against the company. A $4,759,470 settlement fund was established to provide for Group 1001 customers who may have had their information stolen as a result of the ransomware attack. The fund would help pay the victims for any lost time or out-of-pocket losses stemming from the attack.
