= Stan Kasten =

American sports executive

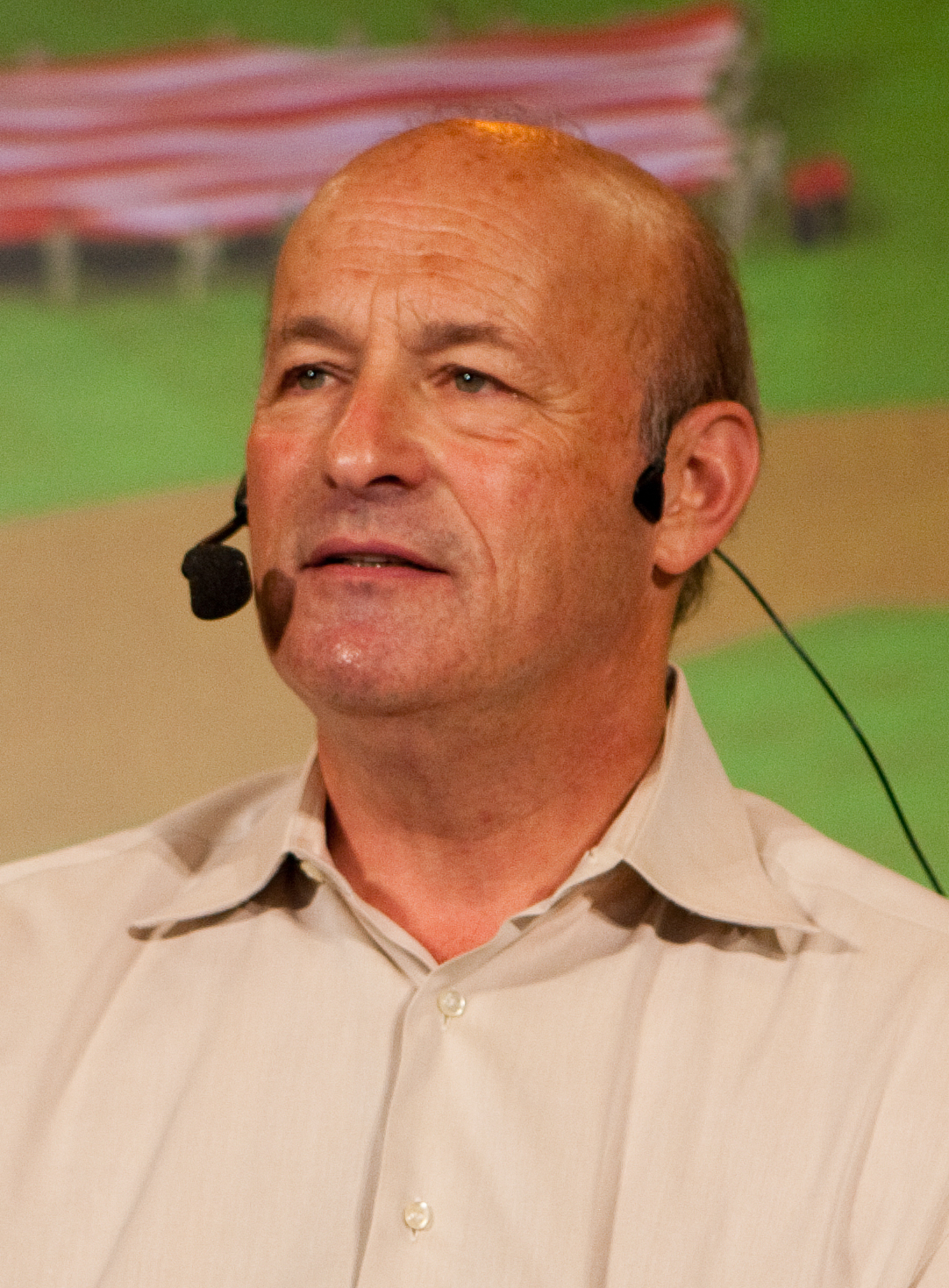
- Born: Stan Kasten; February 1, 1952 (age 74); Lakewood Township, New Jersey, U.S.
- Education: New York University; Columbia Law School
- Known for: Current president of the Los Angeles Dodgers; Former president of the Atlanta Braves and Washington Nationals
- Spouse: Helen Weisz Kasten
- Children: 4

Stan Kasten (born February 1, 1952) is the current president and part-owner of the Los Angeles Dodgers. He was previously the president of the Atlanta Braves and the Washington Nationals. Long involved in Atlanta professional sports, he also served as general manager of the NBA's Atlanta Hawks and president of the NHL's Atlanta Thrashers.

== Early life and education ==
Kasten was born to a Jewish family, the son of Holocaust survivors, Sylvia and Nathan Kasten. He has one sister, Mimi Werbler and one brother, Mitchel Kasten. Kasten attended Orthodox Jewish schools. He graduated from Columbia Law School while living in John Jay Hall. He is also a graduate of New York University. He had also attended Ner Israel Rabbinical College as a high school student for a short time before graduating from the Yeshiva University High School for Boys in 1969.

== Career ==
Kasten was a longtime fixture in Atlanta professional sports primarily due to his association with Ted Turner. It started in 1979, when at age 27 he became the youngest general manager in the National Basketball Association, for the Atlanta Hawks. He held this position until 1990, while becoming the Hawks' president in 1986. During his lengthy tenure in the Hawks' front office, Kasten became the first (and so far the only) NBA executive to win back-to-back NBA Executive of the Year awards, accomplishing this feat in 1986 and 1987. He was also able to build Atlanta into a perennial playoff contender. Led by the Hall of Fame play of superstar Dominique Wilkins, Kasten's Hawks achieved four straight 50-win seasons (1986–1989) and set franchise records in attendance. In the 1990s, he guided Atlanta to a stretch of seven consecutive playoff appearances, although they failed to reach the Conference Finals.

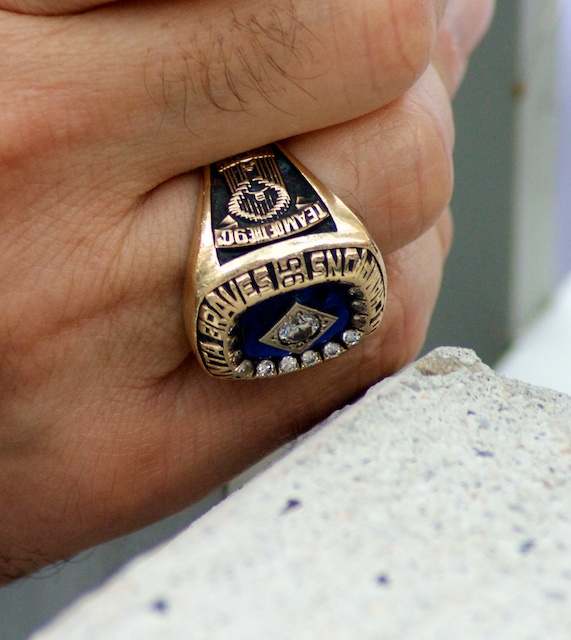
Kasten's World Series ring

Kasten would also become president of the Atlanta Braves in 1986. From 1987 to 2003, the Braves won more games than any other team in major league baseball. As president of the Braves, he delegated all baseball decisions to Atlanta GM John Schuerholz, who put together strong, talented teams that consistently competed for the World Series. The Braves of that time, under the on-field managerial leadership of Bobby Cox, were centered on a powerful pitching staff which featured Greg Maddux, Tom Glavine, Steve Avery and John Smoltz. They also featured All-Star third baseman Chipper Jones, who is regarded as one of the best hitters in Braves' history as well as one of the best switch-hitters and third basemen ever. From 1991 to 2005, the Braves won 14 straight division titles, 5 National League pennants and the World Series championship in 1995 (The 1994 season was ended prematurely, without titles or postseason play, cut short by the players' strike.)

In 1999, when the National Hockey League would award an expansion team to Atlanta, Kasten became president of the Atlanta Thrashers as well as chairman of the newly built Philips Arena, now State Farm Arena. He held all these positions - presidency of the Braves and Thrashers and chair of the Philips Arena - until he stepped down in 2003.

He assumed the presidency of the Washington Nationals in 2006 under the Lerner family ownership group. This occurred immediately following the relocation of the team from Montrreal. It was reported on September 23, 2010, that Kasten would step down as Nationals' team president.

In January 2012, Kasten joined Magic Johnson, Peter Guber and Guggenheim Baseball Management bidding for ownership of the Los Angeles Dodgers baseball team. On March 27, it was reported that the partnership, led by Guggenheim controlling partner Mark Walter, had submitted a winning bid of $2.15 billion (including surrounding land)—some 25% above the nearest offer. Kasten became team president once the sale closed, on April 30, 2012. As Dodgers president, Kasten won World Series championships in 2020, 2024 and 2025.

=== Personal life ===
He is married to Helen Weisz Kasten, and has four children.

== Notes ==
Preceded by Ted Turner	Atlanta Braves President; 1986–2003	Succeeded by John Schuerholz
Preceded by Tony Tavares	Washington Nationals President; 2006–2010	Succeeded by No official president
Preceded by Dennis Mannion	Los Angeles Dodgers President; 2012–present	Succeeded by Current
