= Champion Broadband =

American telecommunications provider

- Company type: Private
- Industry: Telecommunications
- Fate: Internet and telephone services acquired by Giggle Fiber in 2014; Champion retained cable TV services
- Headquarters: Castle Rock, Colorado
- Key people: Mark Haverkate, Chairman and CEO; Dave Haverkate, President and COO
- Products: Cable television, Internet service provider, Telephone
- Website: http://www.championbroadband.com/ (Site no longer active)

Champion Broadband was a cable, Internet, and telephone provider in the United States. It previously operated in the Denver and Los Angeles markets along with smaller rural markets.

In August 2014, it was announced that the internet and telephone services were acquired by Giggle Fiber. Cable TV services were not acquired and were still in operation by Champion Broadband. Both companies are still owned and run by Mark and Dave Haverkate.
