= Alan Smolinisky =

American Entrepreneur

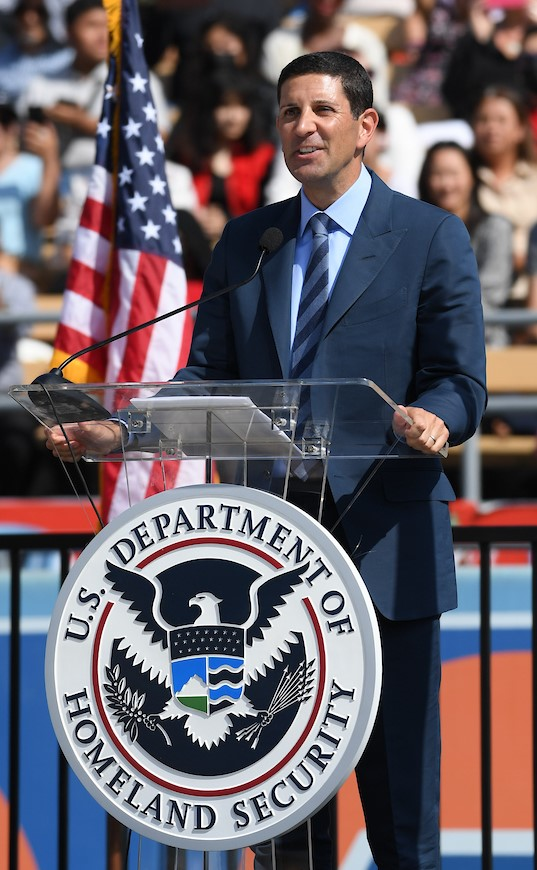
- Smolinisky delivers address to thousands of new U.S. Citizens at Dodger Stadium.
- Born: November 28, 1979 (age 46); Los Angeles, California, U.S.
- Education: University of Southern California
- Occupation: Entrepreneur/investor
- Spouse: Caroline Smolinisky (m. 2010)
- Children: 3

Alan Smolinisky is an American entrepreneur/investor and part-owner of the Los Angeles Dodgers. In June 2022, Smolinisky partnered with Nike founder Phil Knight and submitted an offer of more than $2 billion to purchase the NBA's Portland Trail Blazers.

== Career ==
Smolinisky began his career in commercial real estate in the late 1990s while attending the University of Southern California. Smolinisky partnered with his then landlord Brian Chen. Together, through their company Conquest Student Housing, they built and renovated properties around Campus, eventually becoming the largest provider of student housing at USC, and later at the University of California at Santa Barbara. Conquest became so dominant at USC that the university sued the company under the Sherman Antitrust Act for "monopolizing the student housing market around USC's University Park Campus".

The company was sold to a private equity firm and publicly traded REIT in summer 2008 for $205 million. After the sale, Smolinisky and Chen focused on public securities investment.

Smolinisky and Chen are value investors, an investment paradigm that derives from the ideas on investment that Benjamin Graham and David Dodd began teaching at Columbia Business School in 1928, focusing on acquiring assets below their intrinsic value. Today, that movement is most closely associated with Berkshire Hathaway chairman Warren E. Buffett and his late vice chairman Charlie T. Munger.

Smolinisky and Chen manage their own personal capital from Los Angeles with investments in commercial real estate, publicly traded securities, energy, capital equipment leasing and venture capital.

In May 2026, Smolinisky was named Lead Independent Director for the Jack In The Box (Nasdaq: JACK) Board of Directors. He is also Chairman of the Capital Allocation committee for the company, which owns and franchises over 2,100 restaurants in 24 states.

== The Los Angeles Dodgers ==
Smolinisky became an owner of the Los Angeles Dodgers and the team's home, Dodger Stadium, in 2019, joining partners Mark Walter, Earvin "Magic" Johnson, Peter Guber, Bobby Patton, Todd Boehly and Billie Jean King. In the team's press release announcing his purchase, Smolinisky said "I'm a lifelong Dodger fan and to now be a part of their ownership group is an exciting opportunity and time for me and my family."

In a Time magazine piece written by Smolinisky, he described his poor immigrant father learning to speak English by listening to Vin Scully’s Dodger broadcast while he worked as a janitor. Smolinisky has said the purchase was to honor his immigrant father's love of America and baseball.

In its 2026 rankings, CNBC estimated the value of the Dodgers at $8 billion.

== The Palisadian-Post ==
In 2012, Smolinisky purchased the Palisadian-Post, a subscription based newspaper that served Pacific Palisades, California. The Palisadian-Post was founded in 1928 and ran until 2025. A 2013 front-page Los Angeles Times profile of Smolinisky quoted him as saying "Pacific Palisades is my favorite place on Earth, and the Palisadian-Post is my favorite newspaper." Shortly after his purchase, Smolinisky shut down the printing business, replaced most of the staff, and sold the paper's longtime building due to the printing operation being outsourced. A one-year subscription costed $79.

== Personal life ==
Smolinisky was raised in Pacific Palisades by immigrant parents from Argentina. In a 2019 Harvard University talk, Smolinisky described a difficult childhood including being expelled from two schools before the age of 13. From an early age, Smolinisky was a voracious reader of newspapers, financial reports and books about business, and reportedly spends five hours per day reading. He graduated in three years from the University of Southern California's Thornton School of Music in 2001.

In 2010, Smolinisky married Caroline Sukits from Indiana. They have three children. Their son Charlie was named after Charlie Munger. In August 2015 at Monterey Car Week, an electric GEM car outfitted as a 1970s Land Rover Defender designed by Smolinisky and pal Sir Lucian Grainge won the award for Rueful Brittania (Best British Car) at the annual Concours d'LeMons.

=== Views and philanthropy ===
Smolinisky is an advocate for bi-partisan common sense immigration reform pressing for a country that is both welcoming and secure. On August 29, 2022, Smolinisky organized the first-ever naturalization ceremony held at Dodger Stadium. It was the largest ceremony since the start of the COVID-19 pandemic. 2,119 new citizens from 120 countries were sworn in on the field. In his speech, Smolinisky described his parents' journey as poor immigrants who sacrificed everything to give their children a better life. The speech was later published as an op-ed in USA Today.

Inspired by Warren Buffett and Bill Gates' Giving Pledge, he and his wife created a trust that provides for 90% of their estate to go to charity upon their death. Smolinisky serves on the board of directors of Homeboy Industries, a gang intervention organization founded by Jesuit priest Fr. Gregory Boyle and serves on the board of directors for the LA Dodgers Foundation, the official team charity of the LA Dodgers. Smolinisky served on the board of the ACLU from 2004 to 2016.
