= Mark Walter =

American businessman (born 1960)

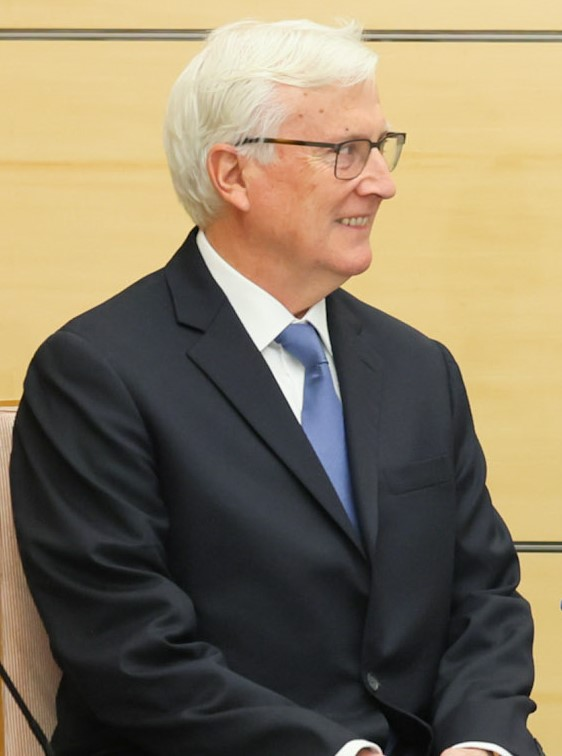
- Mark Walter in 2025
- Born: Mark Richard Walter; May 22, 1960 (age 66); Cedar Rapids, Iowa, U.S.
- Education: Creighton University (BA); Northwestern University (JD)
- Occupation: Investment manager
- Employer(s): Guggenheim Partners; TWG Global
- Known for: Sports team ownership
- Spouse: Kimbra Walter
- Website: guggenheimpartners.com twgglobal.com

Mark Richard Walter (born May 22, 1960) is an American businessman, philanthropist, and the chief executive officer of Guggenheim Partners, a privately held global financial services firm with more than $345 billion in assets under management. He is also the CEO and co-chairman of TWG Global, an American multinational holding company.

Walter is best known for his investments in professional sports. He is the owner and chairman of Major League Baseball's Los Angeles Dodgers, the Women's National Basketball Association's Los Angeles Sparks, the motorsports organization TWG Motorsports, and the Professional Women's Hockey League (PWHL). In addition, he owns part of the Billie Jean King Cup.

== Early life and education ==
Walter grew up in Cedar Rapids, Iowa. His father, Ed, worked at a local concrete block manufacturing plant. He graduated from Cedar Rapids Jefferson High School in 1978.

Walter attended Creighton University, where he studied accounting and graduated with a bachelor's degree in business in 1982. He graduated from the Northwestern University School of Law in 1985.

== Career ==
In 1996, Walter, Tom Irvin, and Steven E. Johnson co-founded the Liberty Hampshire Company. In 1999, he helped found Guggenheim Partners with assistance from Guggenheim family heir Peter Lawson-Johnson II; he now serves as its CEO. Through his work at Guggenheim, he got to know future investment partner Todd Boehly, who spent 14 years with the firm.

In May 2024, Walter co-founded TWG Global and is its CEO, co-chairman, and 21% owner. He is the controlling shareholder of Delaware Life Holdings, LLC, and serves on the board of EquiTrust Life.

Walter has a personal stake in Beyond Meat.

In 2021, it was reported that Walter had purchased numerous commercial and historic buildings in Crested Butte, Colorado, where his family frequently takes vacations.

In September 2025, the Bloomberg Billionaires Index estimated that he had a net worth of $13.3 billion.

== Sports investments ==
Walter uses sports to advertise his insurance companies, particularly TWG Global subsidiary Gainbridge, headquartered in Zionsville, Indiana. It has sponsored racing team Andretti Global since 2018 and the Indianapolis 500. In 2021, it bought the naming rights to the home arena of the Indiana Pacers and Indiana Fever, now known as Gainbridge Fieldhouse. It also signed Fever basketball player Caitlin Clark as a brand ambassador in 2024.

=== Los Angeles Dodgers ===
Walter owns 27% of the Los Angeles Dodgers baseball team. In 2012, he led Guggenheim Baseball Management's $2.15 billion purchase of the team using cash from Guggenheim's investments in insurance and annuities. Walter and his partner investors provided collateral to the insurers, including Dodgers shares, Walter's stake in Carvana, and various Wendy's hamburger franchises. His personal contribution was reportedly $100 million, with Guggenheim Partners-related businesses contributing another $1.213 billion. The precise amount from insurance companies has been disputed, with The Wall Street Journal estimating a contribution of "at least $300 million" and LA Weekly putting the figure at $100 million. Other members of the Guggenheim consortium include Peter Guber, Earvin “Magic” Johnson, Stan Kasten, Todd Boehly, Bobby Patton, Billie Jean King, Ilana Kloss, Alan Smolinisky, and Robert L. Plummer.

Guggenheim's investments in sports have been questioned by industry commentators as riskier investments than insurance. After insurers reportedly contributed at least $300 million to the Dodgers' bid, government regulators investigated the arrangement but declined to take further action.

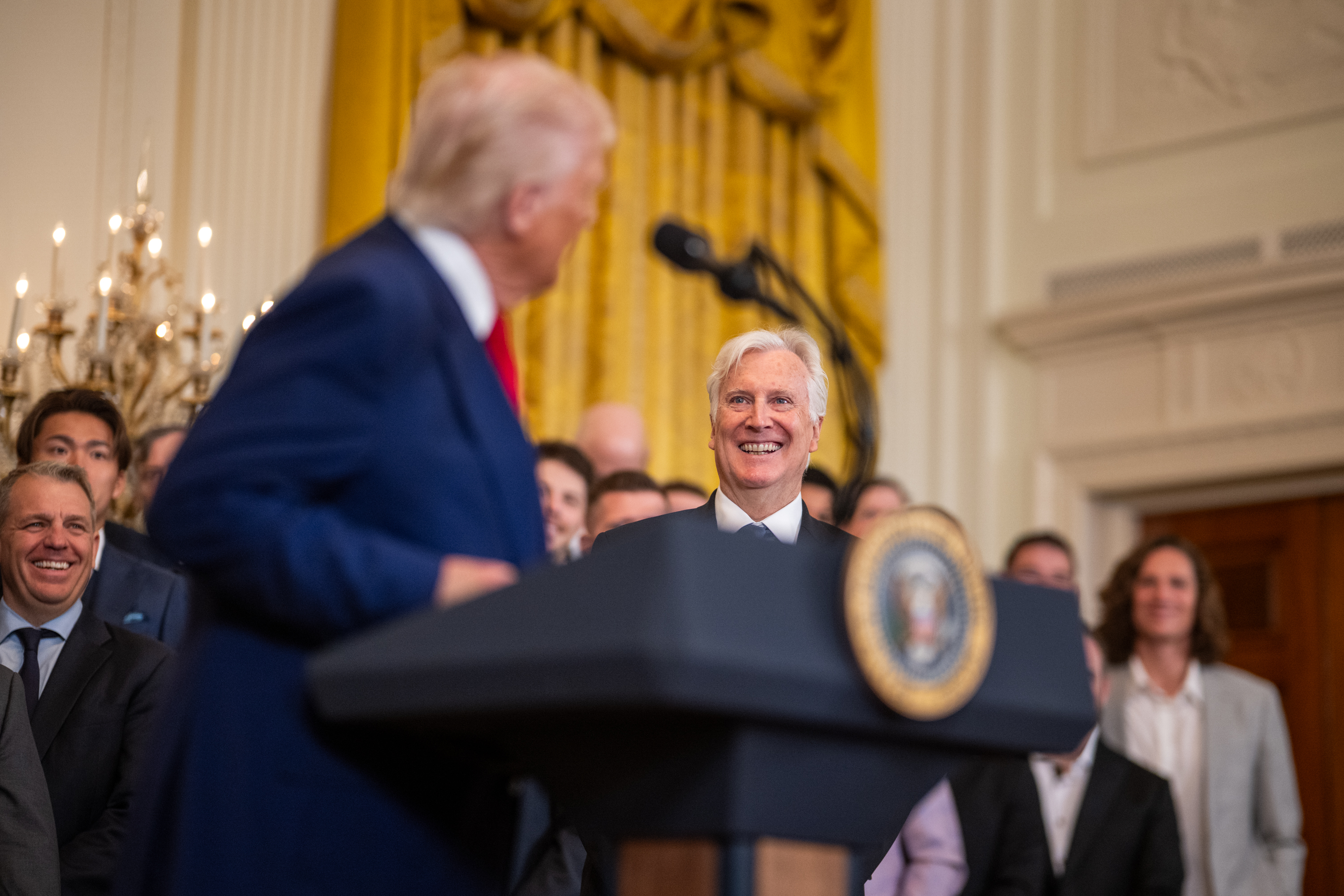
Mark Walter at the White House at an event celebrating the 2024 World Series Champion Los Angeles Dodgers

Walter appointed Kasten to run the team. Under Walter, Kasten, and president of baseball operations Andrew Friedman, the team became baseball's "most perennially competitive team" and won the World Series in 2020, 2024 and 2025. Less than a year after Guggenheim bought the team, the Dodgers signed a television deal that increased their payroll.

=== Basketball ===
In 2014, Walter joined David Geffen, Oprah Winfrey, and Larry Ellison's unsuccessful bid for the Los Angeles Clippers, which eventually went to Steve Ballmer.

Since 2014, Walter and Johnson have led the ownership group for the Los Angeles Sparks, Sparks LA Sports, which also includes Dodgers partners Kasten, Boehly, Patton, and Eric Holoman. He has credited Johnson with giving him the idea to "save the Sparks" and to keep them in Los Angeles.

In 2021, Walter and Boehly acquired a 27% stake in the Lakers from Philip Anschutz, the principal owner of the Los Angeles Kings and a stakeholder in Crypto.com Arena, where both the Lakers and Kings play. Walter had previously led a consortium that bid for Anschutz Entertainment Group, though Anschutz ultimately decided to keep the company.

On June 18, 2025, Walter agreed to buy majority control of the Lakers from the Buss family at a $10 billion valuation. The Los Angeles Times reported that TWG Global would also be involved in the purchase. On August 12, 2026, a year after purchasing the team, Walter agreed to sell the Lakers to Josh Kushner and Bob Iger for $12.5 billion. At the time of sale, Walter was under federal investigation for alleged tax fraud. The investigation is ongoing.

=== European football ===
Walter owns 12.7% of BlueCo, a holding company that bought English Premier League football club Chelsea in 2022 and Ligue 1 club Strasbourg in 2023. Walter serves on Chelsea's board but does not play an active role in day-to-day operations.

On September 16, 2026, Chelsea announced that Clearlake Capital acquired Mark Walter's ownership interest and therefore acquire full control of the club.

=== Women's hockey ===
Walter owns North America's top-level professional women's ice hockey league, the Professional Women's Hockey League (PWHL). In collaboration with Dodgers partners King and Kloss, Walter formed a unified league by consolidating the Professional Women's Hockey Players Association with the remnants of its rival, the Premier Hockey Federation. The purchase ended the PWHPA's boycott of the PHF, which the PWHPA was pressuring to invest more in the sport.

Walter invested in the league and appointed Dodgers partner Kasten to oversee the league's business operations, which began play in 2024. The Mark Walter Group owns the inaugural six teams. The league's championship trophy is named after Walter and his wife.

=== Squash ===
Walter and his wife were the primary financial backers of the 2018–19 PSA Men's World Squash Championship; with their help, the event presented its largest winners' purses in history. They continue to back the event, as well as the Windy City Open.

== Legal troubles ==
Walter has been under federal investigation for alleged tax fraud since 2025; the FBI seized his electronic devices that September. This followed a whistleblower complaint and grand jury subpoenas issued by the U.S. Attorney’s Office for the Southern District of New York and the Securities and Exchange Commission (SEC). Walter and TWG Global have denied any wrongdoing. In September 2026, Walter was sued for allegedly failing to disclose the federal investigation to policyholders.

== Personal life ==
Walter is married to Kimbra Walter, an attorney. She attended Northwestern University and Southern Methodist University Law School. They have a daughter and live in the Lincoln Park neighborhood of Chicago. Walter was an avid fan of the Chicago Cubs growing up. In 2020, FiveThirtyEight reported that he makes bipartisan contributions. In 2011, Walter made a $30,800 contribution to the Democratic National Committee, as well as a $5,000 contribution to Obama for America.

=== Philanthropy ===
Walter serves as a trustee of the Solomon R. Guggenheim Foundation, Creighton University, Northwestern University, and the Field Museum. His wife is a trustee of the Lincoln Park Zoo.

Mark and Kimbra Walter invest together in numerous philanthropic causes, including the White Oak Conservation. In 2014, Walter contributed $40 million to the Northwestern University School of Law (now the Pritzker School of Law), from where he had earned his Juris Doctor degree, and endowed a law scholarship with his wife in 2015.

Walter leads the Los Angeles Dodgers Foundation, which is committed to promoting education and health in the greater Los Angeles community. He donated $50 million at the start of the 2024 season and an additional $50 million when the Dodgers qualified for the World Series.

In October 2024, Walter was awarded the Billie Jean King Leadership Award by the Women's Sports Foundation for his role in starting the PWHL and pledging $5.5 million to the foundation. In 2025, he became a leader of LA Rises, a fundraising group assigned by California Governor Gavin Newsom to support rebuilding after the area's wildfires early in the year, and organized the first $100 million donation.

Business positions
Preceded by Frank McCourt	Chairman of the Los Angeles Dodgers; 2012–present	Succeeded by Incumbent
Sporting positions
Preceded by Buss Family Trust (Jeanie Buss)	Los Angeles Lakers principal owner 2025–present	Incumbent
