= Guggenheim Partners =

American investment and advisory financial services firm

Guggenheim Partners, Inc.

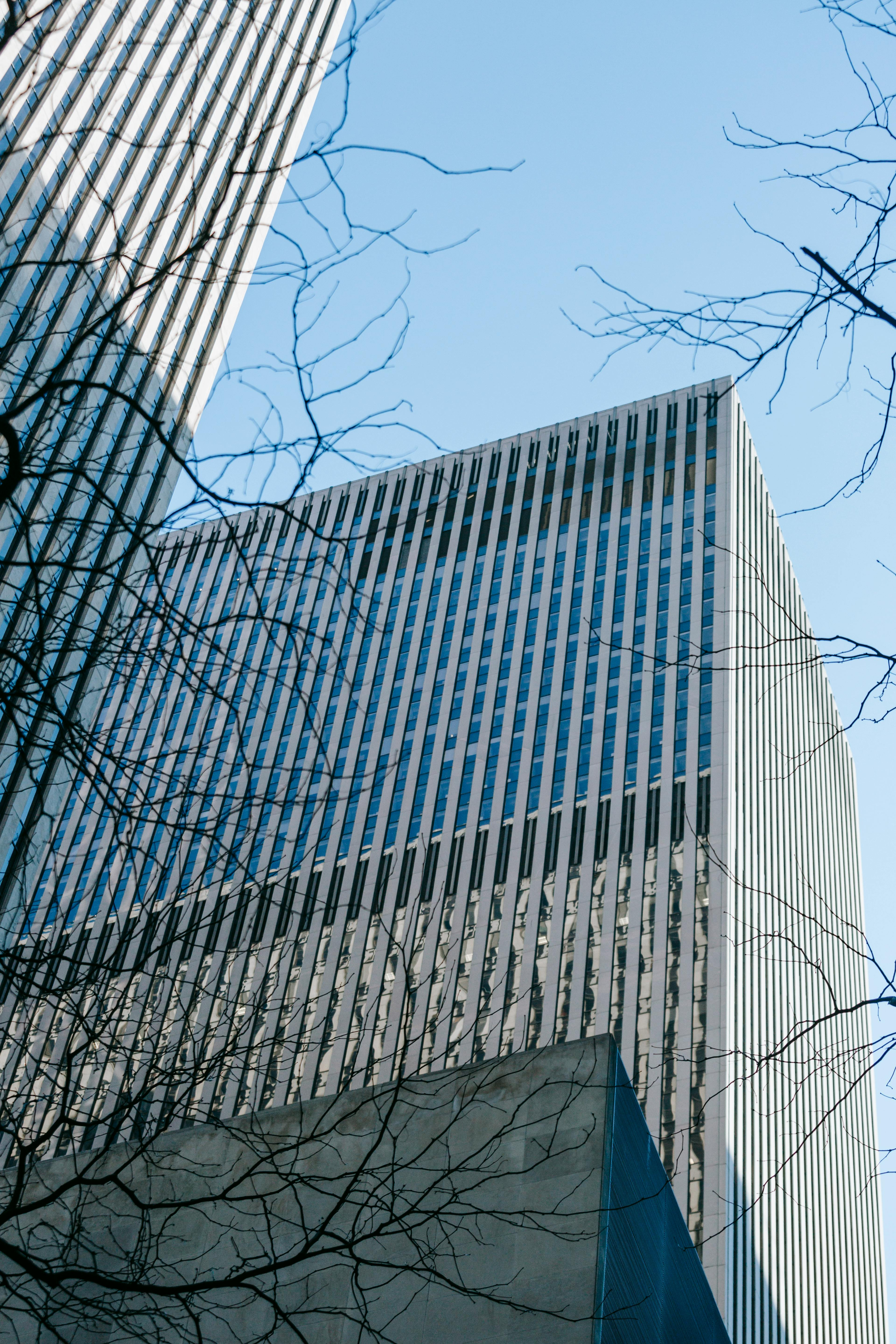
- Headquarters at 330 Madison Avenue in Midtown Manhattan
- Type: Private
- Industry: Financial services
- Founded: 1999; 27 years ago
- Founder: Guggenheim family; Mark Walter; Tom Irvin; J. Todd Morley; Dominic Curcio; Peter Lawson-Johnston II
- Headquarters: 330 Madison Avenue; New York, NY 10017; U.S.
- Area served: Worldwide
- Key people: Mark Walter (CEO)
- Products: Investment banking Capital markets Investment management Merchant banking Wealth management Insurance; Exchange-traded funds Unit investment trusts
- Services: Diversified financial services
- AUM: $330 billion
- Number of employees: 2,400
- Website: guggenheimpartners.com guggenheiminvestments.com

Guggenheim Partners, Inc is an American global investment and advisory financial services firm headquartered in New York City that engages in investment banking, asset management, capital markets services, and insurance services. Guggenheim has approximately 2,000 employees. The firm has additional offices in Chicago, London, Los Angeles, and San Francisco. It facilitates deals in many financial and industrial sectors.

== Organization ==
Guggenheim Partners was founded in 1999 in partnership with the Guggenheim family. Headquartered in Midtown Manhattan, it has more than US$330 billion of assets under management. The firm's CEO is Mark Walter.

Guggenheim Partners provides a broad range of services across asset management and investment banking. Guggenheim Investment Advisors oversees about $50 billion in assets.

== Business ==
=== Background ===
Guggenheim advises clients on mergers and acquisitions, financial restructuring, capital structure and capital raising, and on other strategic and financial transactions. The firm advises corporate clients, family offices, governments, and special committees of Boards of Directors. The firm’s transactions range across industries including consumer and retail, energy, financial institutions, healthcare, industrials, technology, and media and telecommunications.

=== Advisory ===
In October 2009, Guggenheim hired former J.P. Morgan head of Media Investment Banking Mark Van Lith as Senior Managing Director and Head of Investment Banking and former Apollo Global Management director and vice chairman Henry Silverman as vice chairman of asset management.

In January 2013, Guggenheim named former Yahoo! interim CEO Ross Levinsohn as CEO of private equity unit Guggenheim Digital Media.

In May and June 2013, the firm also hired Goldman Sachs Group Inc.'s co-head of U.S. leveraged finance capital markets Tom Stein, former Barclays head of retail investment banking and vice chairman Andrew Taussig, as well as managing directors Spencer Hart, Matthew Pilla, Ken Harada and Ryan Mash.

In September 2013, Guggenheim Securities was named a financial adviser to Verizon in connection with its $130 billion acquisition of Vodafone's 45% stake in Verizon Wireless.

In March 2014, Guggenheim Securities hired Eric Mandl as a Senior Managing Director focusing on Technology, Media and Telecom Investment Banking. In June 2016, they hired Joel Foote as a Senior Managing Director focusing on Energy Investment Banking.

On December 17, 2015, it was reported that the company would spin out its media properties into a new holding company, Eldridge Industries, owned by an investment group led by Guggenheim president Todd Boehly, consisting of Mediabistro, Billboard and The Hollywood Reporter, and Dick Clark Productions.

In April 2018, Invesco Ltd. announced that it completed its previously announced acquisition of Guggenheim Investments' exchange-traded funds (ETF) business, which consisted of $38.8 billion of assets under management (as of February 28, 2018) for $1.2 billion in cash.

In October 2018, Guggenheim Securities was named the lead financial adviser to Red Hat in connection with its $34 billion sale to IBM. The Red Hat sale was, at the time, the largest software transaction in history.

In September 2019, Donini was named to the additional role of Chief Operating Officer of Guggenheim Partners and Andrew Rosenfield, a managing partner, was appointed president. Also in September 2019, Guggenheim hired former Deputy United States Attorney and Director of the Division of Enforcement of the Securities and Exchange Commission Robert S. Khuzami as a Managing Partner and Chief Legal Officer. In the private sector Khuzami was a partner at Kirkland & Ellis LLP and worked at Deutsche Bank AG, including as General Counsel for the Americas.

Guggenheim was a financial advisor to the Directors of Gilead Sciences during the acquisition of CymaBay for $32.50 per share in cash or a total equity value of $4.3 billion in February 2024. They were also advisor to Insight Sourcing in their sale to Accenture earlier that year.

In September 2023, Guggenheim was the co-manager for the initial public offering of Arm Holdings, a portfolio company of the Softbank Group at a valuation of $4.87 billion.

In November 2024, the firm was retained by American sandwich chain Jersey Mike's Subs as lead advisor on their sale to Blackstone. This deal was valued at approximately $8 billion.

In January 2025, Guggenheim advised Major League Baseball (MLB) in its $9 billion debt restructuring deal in connection with Main Street Sports Group.

The firm's restructuring team offers services that include advising companies, governments, creditors, and financial sponsors on distressed M&A, recapitalizations, reorganizations, exchange offers, debt repurchases and capital raises across industries such as automotive, consumer products, energy, financial institutions, healthcare, real estate, gaming & leisure, manufacturing, media & communications, retail, shipping, steel and transportation.

The firm competes with all investment banks that provide strategic advisory services. Main competitors include other leading independent advisory firms such as Centerview, Hamilton Lane, Evercore, Greenhill & Co., Moelis & Company, Lazard, and Perella Weinberg Partners.

=== Investments ===
In May 2009, Guggenheim Partners acquired a controlling interest in financial services firm Transparent Value LLC. In July 2009, it acquired Claymore Group, a firm known for its Exchange-traded funds and unit investment trusts. In December 2009, Guggenheim acquired a division of Wellmark and renamed it Guggenheim Life & Annuity. In February 2010, Guggenheim Partners acquired Security Benefit Corp, parent company of Rydex Funds. In October 2011, it acquired the life insurance company EquiTrust from FBL Financial Group. In 2012, Guggenheim affiliates acquired the US annuities business of Canadian insurers Industrial Alliance and Sun Life Financial.

In July 2014, Guggenheim announced the launch of a representative office in Tokyo and the hiring of Atsuhito Sakai as Senior Managing Director and Guggenheim's Representative in Japan. Also in 2014, the firm acquired the London operations of Lazard Capital Markets. Guggenheim Securities expanded its investment banking business in July 2019 in Chicago with the hiring of two senior bankers from William Blair's technology group, James Suprenant and Scott Stevens.

That September, Guggenheim bought a stake in the entertainment production company Dick Clark Productions, which produces specials such as the American Music Awards and the Golden Globe Awards and other television programming.

In January 2013, the company bought out the remainder of the business-to-business media company Prometheus Global Media and invested $6 million in the gift card exchange CardCash in November of the same year. In February 2014, Guggenheim Partners acquired the Los Angeles Sparks of the WNBA.

In November 2021, it was reported that Guggenheim Investments, alongside the actor Channing Tatum and fellow investment company Endeavor, had agreed to backstop the planned $1 billion merger between Los Angeles-based blank-check firm Bright Lights and Manscaped.

== See also ==
- Guggenheim Baseball Management
- List of investment banks
- Boutique investment bank
- Asset management
- Investment banking
