= 1984 Los Angeles Dodgers season =

1984 Los Angeles Dodgers
- League: National League
- Division: West
- Ballpark: Dodger Stadium
- City: Los Angeles
- Record: 79–83 (.488)
- Divisional place: 4th
- Owner: Peter O'Malley
- General managers: Al Campanis
- Managers: Tommy Lasorda
- Television: KTTV (11); Vin Scully, Jerry Doggett, Ross Porter; ONTV; Eddie Doucette, Al Downing
- Radio: KABC; Vin Scully, Jerry Doggett, Ross Porter; KTNQ; Jaime Jarrín, René Cárdenas

The 1984 Los Angeles Dodgers season was the 95th season for the Los Angeles Dodgers franchise in Major League Baseball (MLB), their 27th season in Los Angeles, California, and their 23rd season playing their home games at Dodger Stadium. The Dodgers failed to defend their National League West title from the year before, suffering a losing season for just the second time since 1969, and missed out on the postseason.

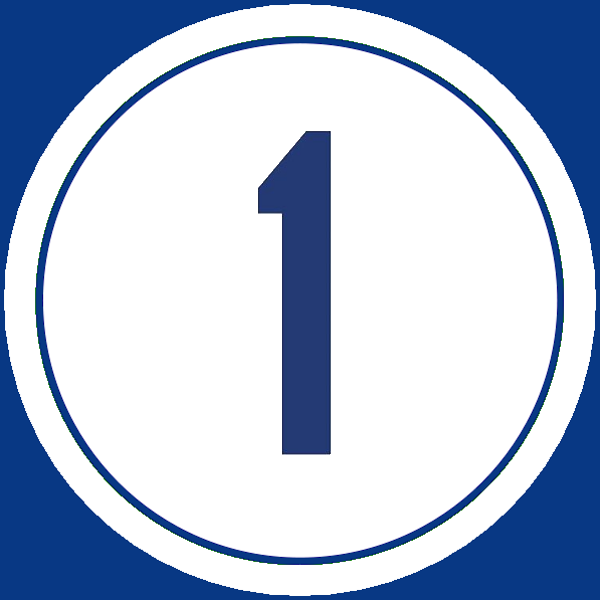
Pee Wee Reese's number 1 was retired by the Los Angeles Dodgers in 1984.

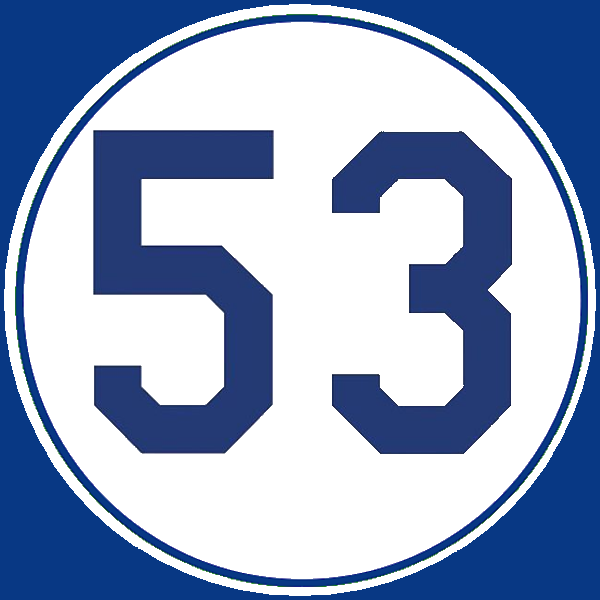
Don Drysdale's number 53 was retired by the Los Angeles Dodgers in 1984.

== Regular season ==
=== Season standings ===
NL West
Team	W	L	Pct.	GB	Home	Road
San Diego Padres	92	70	.568	—	48‍–‍33	44‍–‍37
Atlanta Braves	80	82	.494	12	38‍–‍43	42‍–‍39
Houston Astros	80	82	.494	12	43‍–‍38	37‍–‍44
Los Angeles Dodgers	79	83	.488	13	40‍–‍41	39‍–‍42
Cincinnati Reds	70	92	.432	22	39‍–‍42	31‍–‍50
San Francisco Giants	66	96	.407	26	35‍–‍46	31‍–‍50

=== Record vs. opponents ===
1984 National League record Sources:
Team	ATL	CHC	CIN	HOU	LAD	MON	NYM	PHI	PIT	SD	SF	STL
Atlanta	—	3–9	13–5	12–6	6–12	5–7	4–8	7–5	8–4	7–11	10–8	5–7
Chicago	9–3	—	7–5	6–6	7–5	10–7	12–6	9–9	8–10	6–6	9–3	13–5
Cincinnati	5–13	5–7	—	8–10	7–11	7–5	3–9	5–7	7–5	7–11	12–6	4–8
Houston	6–12	6–6	10–8	—	9–9	7–5	4–8	6–6	6–6	6–12	12–6	8–4
Los Angeles	12–6	5–7	7–11	9–9	—	6–6	3–9	3–9	4–8	10–8	10–8	6–6
Montreal	7–5	7–10	5–7	5–7	6–6	—	7–11	11–7	7–11	7–5	7–5	9–9
New York	8–4	6–12	9–3	8–4	9–3	11–7	—	10–8	12–6	6–6	4–8	7–11
Philadelphia	5-7	9–9	7–5	6–6	9–3	7–11	8–10	—	7–11	7–5	8–4	8–10
Pittsburgh	4–8	10–8	5–7	6–6	8–4	11–7	6–12	11–7	—	4–8	6–6	4–14
San Diego	11–7	6–6	11–7	12–6	8–10	5–7	6–6	5–7	8–4	—	13–5	7–5
San Francisco	8–10	3–9	6–12	6–12	8–10	5–7	8–4	4–8	6–6	5–13	—	7–5
St. Louis	7–5	5–13	8–4	4–8	6–6	9–9	11–7	10–8	14–4	5–7	5–7	—

=== Opening day lineup ===
Opening Day starters
Name	Position
Steve Sax	Second baseman
Bill Russell	Shortstop
Ken Landreaux	Center fielder
Pedro Guerrero	First baseman
Mike Marshall	Left fielder
Candy Maldonado	Right fielder
Germán Rivera	Third baseman
Mike Scioscia	Catcher
Fernando Valenzuela	Starting pitcher

=== Notable transactions ===
- September 1, 1984: Juan Bell was signed as an amateur free agent by the Dodgers.
- December 7, 1984: Acquired Joe Szeneley, Jose Torres and John Serritella from the Kansas City Royals for Joe Beckwith
- December 8, 1984: Acquired Carlos Diaz and Bob Bailor from the New York Mets for Sid Fernandez

=== Roster ===
1984 Los Angeles Dodgers
Roster
Pitchers: 27 Carlos Diaz; 55 Orel Hershiser; 40 Rick Honeycutt; 46 Burt Hooton; 43 Ken Howell; 49 Tom Niedenfuer; 26 Alejandro Peña; 41 Jerry Reuss; 56 Rich Rodas; 34 Fernando Valenzuela; 35 Bob Welch; 47 Larry White; 38 Pat Zachry	Catchers: 31 Jack Fimple; 15 Gilberto Reyes; 14 Mike Scioscia; 7 Steve Yeager; Infielders: 10 Dave Anderson; 21 Bob Bailor; 33 Sid Bream; 9 Greg Brock; 28 Pedro Guerrero; 17,37 Rafael Landestoy; 16 Rick Monday; 25 Germán Rivera; 18 Bill Russell; 3 Steve Sax	Outfielders: 17 Ed Amelung; 50 Tony Brewer; 44 Ken Landreaux; 20 Candy Maldonado; 5 Mike Marshall; 51 Lemmie Miller; 23 R.J. Reynolds; 37 Mike Vail; 45 Terry Whitfield; Other batters: 43 José Morales	Manager: 2 Tommy Lasorda; Coaches: 8 Joey Amalfitano; 54 Monty Basgall; 58 Mark Cresse; 11 Manny Mota; 29 Ron Perranoski

== Player stats ==
=== Batting ===
==== Starters by position ====
Note: Pos = Position; G = Games played; AB = At bats; H = Hits; Avg. = Batting average; HR = Home runs; RBI = Runs batted in

Pos	Player	G	AB	H	Avg.	HR	RBI
C	Mike Scioscia	114	341	93	.273	5	38
1B	Greg Brock	88	271	61	.225	14	34
2B	Steve Sax	145	569	138	.243	1	35
SS	Dave Anderson	121	374	94	.251	3	34
3B	Pedro Guerrero	144	535	162	.303	16	72
LF	Mike Marshall	134	495	127	.257	21	65
CF	Ken Landreaux	134	438	110	.251	11	47
RF	Candy Maldonado	116	254	68	.268	5	28

==== Other batters ====
Note: G = Games played; AB = At bats; H = Hits; Avg. = Batting average; HR = Home runs; RBI = Runs batted in

Player	G	AB	H	Avg.	HR	RBI
Bill Russell	89	262	70	.267	0	19
R.J. Reynolds	73	240	62	.258	2	24
Germán Rivera	94	227	59	.260	2	17
Franklin Stubbs	87	217	42	.194	8	17
Steve Yeager	74	197	45	.228	4	29
Terry Whitfield	87	180	44	.244	4	18
Bob Bailor	65	131	36	.275	0	8
Rafael Landestoy	53	54	10	.185	1	2
Sid Bream	27	49	9	.184	0	6
Rick Monday	31	47	9	.191	1	7
Ed Amelung	34	46	10	.217	0	4
Tony Brewer	24	37	4	.108	1	4
Jack Fimple	12	26	5	.192	0	3
José Morales	22	19	3	.158	0	0
Mike Vail	16	16	1	.063	0	2
Lemmie Miller	8	12	2	.167	0	0
Gilberto Reyes	4	5	0	.000	0	0

=== Pitching ===
==== Starting pitchers ====
Note: G = Games pitched; IP = Innings pitched; W = Wins; L = Losses; ERA = Earned run average; SO = Strikeouts

Player	G	IP	W	L	ERA	SO
Fernando Valenzuela	34	261.0	12	17	3.03	240
Alejandro Peña	28	199.1	12	6	2.48	135
Rick Honeycutt	29	183.2	10	9	2.84	75
Bob Welch	31	178.2	13	13	3.78	126

==== Other pitchers ====
Note: G = Games pitched; IP = Innings pitched; W = Wins; L = Losses; ERA = Earned run average; SO = Strikeouts

Player	G	IP	W	L	ERA	SO
Orel Hershiser	45	189.2	11	8	2.66	150
Burt Hooton	54	110.0	3	6	3.44	62
Jerry Reuss	30	99.0	5	7	3.82	44
Larry White	7	12.0	0	1	3.00	10

==== Relief pitchers ====
Note: G = Games pitched; W = Wins; L = Losses; SV = Saves; ERA = Earned run average; SO = Strikeouts

Player	G	W	L	SV	ERA	SO
Tom Niedenfuer	33	2	5	11	2.47	45
Pat Zachry	58	5	6	2	3.81	55
Carlos Diaz	37	1	0	1	5.49	36
Ken Howell	32	5	5	6	3.33	54
Rich Rodas	3	0	0	0	5.40	1

== Awards and honors ==
- 1984 Major League Baseball All-Star Game
  - Fernando Valenzuela reserve
- NL Pitcher of the Month
  - Rick Honeycutt (April 1984)
  - Orel Hershiser (July 1984)
- NL Player of the Week
  - Candy Maldonado (April 16–22)
  - Orel Hershiser (July 9–15)

== Farm system ==
Level	Team	League	Manager
AAA	Albuquerque Dukes	Pacific Coast League	Terry Collins
AA	San Antonio Dodgers	Texas League	Gary LaRocque
High A	Bakersfield Dodgers	California League	Don LeJohn
High A	Vero Beach Dodgers	Florida State League	Stan Wasiak
Rookie	Great Falls Dodgers	Pioneer League	Kevin Kennedy
Rookie	Gulf Coast Dodgers	Gulf Coast League	Joe Alvarez

== Major League Baseball draft ==
The Dodgers drafted 28 players in the June draft and 13 in the January draft. Of those, six players would eventually play in the Major Leagues.

The Dodgers first-round pick in the June draft was pitcher Dennis Livingston from Oklahoma State University. He remained with the Dodgers organization until 1987 before moving to the Montreal Expos system. In six seasons in the minors he accumulated a record of 24-36 and a 5.13 ERA in 165 games (59 as a starter). This draft did produce three Major League relief pitchers in Tim Scott (round 2), Darren Holmes (round 16) and Jeff Nelson (round 22) as well as utility player Tracy Woodson (round 3).

1984 draft picks

=== January draft ===
Round	Name	Position	School	Signed	Career span	Highest level
1	John Alva	IF	Pima Community College	No; Braves-1985	1985–1991	AAA
2	Keith Nicholson	RHP	Mission College	No; Tigers-1984	1984–1988	A
3	Eddie Citronelli	C	Ranger College	No		
4	Jovon Edwards	OF	Alfred University	Yes	1984–1989	AA
5	Kevin Phillips	RHP	Panola College	No		
6	Tim McCoy	LHP	Mt. San Antonio College	No; Giants-1986	1986–1991	AAA
7	Ted Brooks	OF	Victor Valley College	No		
8	Brent Bolin	RHP	Central Arizona College	No		
9	Keith Sheldon	RHP	Georgia Perimeter College	No; Braves-1985	1985	Rookie
10	Daniel Robles	OF	Mt. San Antonio College	Yes	1984–1985	Rookie
11	Kelly Wilson	OF	Paris Junior College	No		

==== January secondary phase ====
Round	Name	Position	School	Signed	Career span	Highest level
1	Shawn Hillegas	RHP	Middle Georgia College	Yes	1984–1995	MLB
2	Vincent Shinholster	SS	Santa Ana College	No	1987	A

=== June draft ===
Round	Name	Position	School	Signed	Career span	Highest level
1	Dennis Livingston	LHP	Oklahoma State University	Yes	1984–1991	AAA
2	Tim Scott	RHP	Hanford High School	Yes	1984–2002	MLB
3	Tracy Woodson	1B	North Carolina State University	Yes	1984–1996	MLB
4	Dave Carlucci	C	Westfield State College	Yes	1984–1986	A
5	James Ward	2B	University of Arkansas	Yes	1984–1987	A
6	Michael Pesavento	LHP	North Carolina State University	Yes	1984–1985	A
7	Jeff Edwards	LHP	Vanderbilt University	Yes	1984–1990	AAA
8	Jay Hornacek	3B	Lyons Township High School	Yes	1984–1990	A+
9	Jeffrey Brown	OF	University of Southern California	Yes	1984–1988	AAA
10	Jimmy Williams	LHP	Choctaw County High School	Yes	1984–2003	AAA
11	Ted Holcomb	SS	Westchester High School	Yes	1984–1988	A
12	Doug Treadway	RHP	Florida State University	Yes	1984–1988	A
13	John Schlichting	OF	University of Minnesota	Yes	1984–1986	A
14	Robert Jacobsen	RHP	California State University, Fresno	Yes	1984–1986	A
15	Jack Ritch	2B	Georgia Perimeter College	Yes	1984–1985	A
16	Darren Holmes	RHP	T. C. Roberson High School	Yes	1984–2003	MLB
17	Greg Smith	OF	Baylor School	No; Padres-1988	1988–1990	A+
18	Adrian Adkins	C	Jones County High School	No; Pirates-1989	1989	Rookie
19	Craig Dorsey	OF	Community College of Baltimore County, Catonsville Campus	Yes	1984–1985	Rookie
20	Brad Freking	LHP	Wauconda High School	No		
21	Edward Jacobo	OF	California State University, Fresno	Yes	1984–1986	A
22	Jeff Nelson	RHP	Catonsville High School	Yes	1984–2006	MLB
23	Jerald Clark	OF	Lamar University	No; Padres-1985	1985–1997	MLB
24	John Cowan	OF	Montclair State University	No; Orioles-1985	1985	A-

==== June secondary phase ====
Round	Name	Position	School	Signed	Career span	Highest level
1	Greg Mayberry	RHP	Ferrum College	Yes	1984–1990	AAA
2	Brian Kopetsky	IF	Community College of Baltimore County, Dundalk Campus	Yes	1984–1986	A
3	Dave Satnat	LHP	Modesto Junior College	Yes	1984–1986	A
4	Scott Clemo	3B	Gulf Coast Community College	No; Expos-1986	1986–1988	AAA
