= 1983 Los Angeles Dodgers season =

1983 Los Angeles Dodgers
- National League West Champions
- League: National League
- Division: West
- Ballpark: Dodger Stadium
- City: Los Angeles
- Record: 91–71–1 (.561)
- Divisional place: 1st
- Owner: Peter O'Malley
- General managers: Al Campanis
- Managers: Tommy Lasorda
- Television: KTTV (11); Vin Scully, Jerry Doggett, Ross Porter; ONTV; Geoff Witcher, Al Downing
- Radio: KABC; Vin Scully, Jerry Doggett, Ross Porter; KTNQ; Jaime Jarrín, René Cárdenas

The 1983 Los Angeles Dodgers season was the 94th season for the Los Angeles Dodgers franchise in Major League Baseball (MLB), their 26th season in Los Angeles, California, and their 22nd season playing their home games at Dodger Stadium. The Dodgers rebounded from being eliminated from the playoffs on the final day of the previous season to win their second National League West title in three years, but lost in the NLCS to the Philadelphia Phillies 3 games to 1.

== Offseason ==
- December 28, 1982: Acquired Pat Zachry from the New York Mets for Jorge Orta.
- January 20, 1983: Acquired Vance Lovelace and Dan Cataline from the Chicago Cubs for Ron Cey.
- March 28, 1983: Acquired Ivan Mesa from the Minnesota Twins for Tack Wilson.
- March 29, 1983: Acquired Steve Walker, Jody Johnston and cash from the New York Mets for Mark Bradley.

== Regular season ==
=== Season standings ===
NL West
Team	W	L	Pct.	GB	Home	Road
Los Angeles Dodgers	91	71	.562	—	48‍–‍32	43‍–‍39
Atlanta Braves	88	74	.543	3	46‍–‍34	42‍–‍40
Houston Astros	85	77	.525	6	46‍–‍36	39‍–‍41
San Diego Padres	81	81	.500	10	47‍–‍34	34‍–‍47
San Francisco Giants	79	83	.488	12	43‍–‍38	36‍–‍45
Cincinnati Reds	74	88	.457	17	36‍–‍45	38‍–‍43

=== Record vs. opponents ===
1983 National League record Sources:
Team	ATL	CHC	CIN	HOU	LAD	MON	NYM	PHI	PIT	SD	SF	STL
Atlanta	—	5–7	12–6	11–7	7–11	7–5	8–4	7–5	6–6	9–9	9–9	7–5
Chicago	7–5	—	4–8	5–7	6–6	7–11	9–9	5–13	9–9	5–7	4–8	10–8
Cincinnati	6–12	8–4	—	5–13	7–11	4–8	7–5	6–6	6–6	9–9	10–8	6–6
Houston	7–11	7–5	13–5	—	6–12	8–4	9–3	4–8	6–6	11–7	12–6	2–10
Los Angeles	11–7	6–6	11–7	12–6	—	7–5	7–5	11–1	6–6	6–12–1	5–13	9–3
Montreal	5–7	11–7	8–4	4–8	5–7	—	8–10	8–10–1	8–10	8–4	8–4	9–9
New York	4–8	9–9	5–7	3–9	5–7	10–8	—	6–12	9–9	6–6	5–7	6–12
Philadelphia	5-7	13–5	6–6	8–4	1–11	10–8–1	12–6	—	11–7	5–7	5–7	14–4
Pittsburgh	6–6	9–9	6–6	6–6	6–6	10–8	9–9	7–11	—	9–3	6–6	10–8
San Diego	9–9	7–5	9–9	7–11	12–6–1	4–8	6–6	7–5	3–9	—	11–7	6–6
San Francisco	9–9	8–4	8–10	6–12	13–5	4–8	7–5	7–5	6–6	7–11	—	4–8
St. Louis	5–7	8–10	6–6	10–2	3–9	9–9	12–6	4–14	8–10	6–6	8–4	—

=== Opening Day lineup ===
Opening Day Starters
Name	Position
Steve Sax	Second baseman
Ken Landreaux	Center fielder
Dusty Baker	Left fielder
Pedro Guerrero	Third baseman
Greg Brock	First baseman
Mike Marshall	Right fielder
Bill Russell	Shortstop
Steve Yeager	Catcher
Fernando Valenzuela	Starting pitcher

=== Roster ===
1983 Los Angeles Dodgers
**Roster**
**Pitchers**: 27 Joe Beckwith; 50 Sid Fernandez; 55 Orel Hershiser; 23,40 Rick Honeycutt; 46 Burt Hooton; 57 Steve Howe; 49 Tom Niedenfuer; 26 Alejandro Peña; 41 Jerry Reuss; 56 Rich Rodas; 48 Dave Stewart; 34 Fernando Valenzuela; 35 Bob Welch; 47 Larry White; 21 Ricky Wright; 38 Pat Zachry	**Catchers**: 31 Jack Fimple; 15 Gilberto Reyes; 22 Dave Sax; 14 Mike Scioscia; 7 Steve Yeager; **Infielders**: 10,62 Dave Anderson; 9 Greg Brock; 33 Sid Bream; 28 Pedro Guerrero; 17 Rafael Landestoy; 43 José Morales; 25 Germán Rivera; 18 Bill Russell; 3 Steve Sax; 37 Alex Taveras	**Outfielders**: 12 Dusty Baker; 52 Cecil Espy; 44 Ken Landreaux; 20 Candy Maldonado; 5 Mike Marshall; 16 Rick Monday; 23 R. J. Reynolds; 40 Ron Roenicke; 30 Derrel Thomas	**Manager**: 2 Tommy Lasorda; **Coaches**: 8 Joey Amalfitano; 54 Monty Basgall; 58 Mark Cresse; 11 Manny Mota; 29 Ron Perranoski

=== Notable transactions ===
- May 2, 1983: Tom Klawitter was released by the Dodgers.
- May 9, 1983: Acquired Rafael Landestoy from the Cincinnati Reds for Brett Wise and John Franco
- August 19, 1983: Dave Stewart, Ricky Wright and cash were traded by the Dodgers to the Texas Rangers for Rick Honeycutt.

Legend
	Dodgers win
	Dodgers loss
	Postponement
	Clinched division
**Bold**	Dodgers team member

1983 regular season game log: 91–71–1 (Home: 50–31; Away: 45–35–1)
April: 14–6 (Home: 6–3; Away: 8–3)

#	Date	Time (PT)	Opponent	Score	Win	Loss	Save	Time of Game	Attendance	Record	Box Streak
1	April 5		@ Astros	**W** 16–7						1–0	W1
2	April 6		@ Astros	**W** 4–2						2–0	W2
3	April 8		Expos	L 3–8						2–1	L1
4	April 9		Expos	L 2–7						2–2	L2
5	April 10		Expos	**W** 3–0						3–2	W1
6	April 11		Astros	**W** 4–3 (11)						4–2	W2
7	April 12		Astros	**W** 3–1						5–2	W3
8	April 13		Astros	**W** 5–3 (14)						6–2	W4
9	April 15		Padres	**W** 6–2						7–2	W5
10	April 16		Padres	**W** 8–5						8–2	W6
11	April 17		Padres	L 1–9						8–3	L1
14	April 22		@ Pirates	**W** 4–2						10–4	W1
15	April 23		@ Pirates	**W** 3–2						11–4	W2
—	April 24	10:35 a.m. PDT	@ Pirates	Postponed (rain); Makeup: July 19							
16	April 25		@ Cardinals	**W** 8–0						12–4	W3
17	April 26		@ Cardinals	**W** 3–1						13–4	W4
18	April 27		@ Cardinals	L 6–7						13–5	L1

May: 18–8 (Home: 9–5; Away: 9–3)

#	Date	Time (PT)	Opponent	Score	Win	Loss	Save	Time of Game	Attendance	Record	Box Streak
22	May 2		Pirates	L 1–5						15–7	L1
23	May 3		Pirates	**W** 5–4						16–7	W1
24	May 4		Pirates	**W** 3–2						17–7	W2
25	May 6		Cardinals	**W** 16–10						18–7	W3
26	May 7		Cardinals	**W** 5–3						19–7	W4
27	May 8		Cardinals	**W** 6–4						20–7	W5
30	May 12		@ Padres	**W** 4–3						22–8	W1
31	May 13		@ Padres	L 4–6						22–9	L1
32	May 14		@ Padres	**W** 4–1						23–9	W1
33	May 15		@ Padres	**W** 3–2						24–9	W2
34	May 17		@ Expos	L 2–3 (15)						24–10	L1
35	May 18		@ Expos	**W** 13–3						25–10	W1
38	May 23		@ Phillies	**W** 2–0						27–11	W2
39	May 24		@ Phillies	**W** 3–0						28–11	W3
40	May 25		@ Phillies	**W** 6–1						29–11	W4
45	May 30		Phillies	**W** 5–2						31–14	W1
46	May 31		Phillies	**W** 4–1						32–14	W2

June: 14–14 (Home: 9–9; Away: 5–5)

#	Date	Time (PT)	Opponent	Score	Win	Loss	Save	Time of Game	Attendance	Record	Box Streak
47	June 1		Phillies	**W** 1–0						33–14	W3
52	June 7		@ Braves	L 1–4						35–17	L2
53	June 8		@ Braves	**W** 11–5						36–17	W1
54	June 9		@ Braves	**W** 4–2						37–17	W2
59	June 14		Braves	**W** 4–3						40–19	W2
60	June 15		Braves	L 2–3						40–20	L1
61	June 16		Braves	**W** 6–1						41–20	W1
65	June 20		Padres	L 1–4						43–22	L1
66	June 21		Padres	L 0–2						43–23	L2
67	June 22		Padres	L 2–5						43–24	L3
68	June 23		Padres	L 5–7						43–25	L4
69	June 24		Astros	**W** 7–2						44–25	W1
70	June 25		Astros	**W** 2–1 (11)						45–25	W2
71	June 26		Astros	L 7–9						45–26	L1
72	June 28		@ Padres	**W** 9–5						46–26	W1
73	June 29		@ Padres	L 2–13						46–27	L1
74	June 30		@ Padres	L 6–7						46–28	L2

July: 11–17 (Home: 5–5; Away: 6–12)

#	Date	Time (PT)	Opponent	Score	Win	Loss	Save	Time of Game	Attendance	Record	Box Streak
75	July 1		@ Astros	**W** 5–2 (10)						47–28	W1
76	July 2		@ Astros	L 1–3						47–29	L1
77	July 2		@ Astros	L 1–8						47–30	L2
78	July 2		@ Astros	L 4–5						47–31	L3
—	July 6	5:30 p.m. PDT	54th All-Star Game	National League vs. American League (Comiskey Park, Chicago, Illinois)							
79	July 8		Pirates	L 3–4						47–32	L4
80	July 9		Pirates	L 0–3						47–33	L5
81	July 10		Pirates	**W** 10–3						48–33	W1
82	July 11		Cardinals	**W** 7–6						49–33	W2
83	July 12		Cardinals	**W** 3–1						50–33	W3
84	July 13		Cardinals	L 5–6						50–34	L1
89 (1)	July 19		@ Pirates	L 1–4						52–37	L2
90 (2)	July 19		@ Pirates	**W** 3–2 (11)						53–37	W1
91	July 20		@ Pirates	L 3–7						53–38	L1
92	July 21		@ Pirates	L 4–5						53–39	L2
93	July 22		@ Cardinals	**W** 9–4						54–39	W1
94	July 23		@ Cardinals	**W** 10–5						55–39	W2
95	July 24		@ Cardinals	L 0–3						55–40	L1

August: 20–10 (Home: 12–4; Away: 8–6)

#	Date	Time (PT)	Opponent	Score	Win	Loss	Save	Time of Game	Attendance	Record	Box Streak
107	August 5		Braves	**W** 2–1						60–47	W1
108	August 6		Braves	**W** 4–2						61–47	W2
109	August 7		Braves	L 2–5						61–48	L1
113	August 12		@ Braves	**W** 5–3						63–50	W2
114	August 13		@ Braves	L 7–8						63–51	W1
115	August 14		@ Braves	**W** 5–4						64–51	L1
119	August 19		Phillies	**W** 3–0						67–52	W3
120	August 20		Phillies	**W** 4–3						68–52	W4
121	August 21		Phillies	**W** 6–0						69–52	W5
122	August 22		Expos	**W** 4–1						70–52	W6
123	August 23		Expos	**W** 6–3						71–52	W7
124	August 24		Expos	**W** 3–2						72–52	W8
125	August 26		@ Phillies	L 1–4						72–53	L1
126	August 27		@ Phillies	**W** 6–1						73–53	W1
127	August 28		@ Phillies	**W** 8–3						74–53	W2

September: 14–14–1 (Home: 7–4; Away: 7–10–1)

#	Date	Time (PT)	Opponent	Score	Win	Loss	Save	Time of Game	Attendance	Record	Box Streak
133	September 1		@ Expos	L 3–8						77–56	L2
134	September 2		@ Expos	**W** 4–1						78–56	W1
135	September 3		@ Expos	**W** 4–0						78–56	W2
136	September 4		@ Expos	L 2–3 (12)						79–57	L1
137	September 5		Padres	L 2–5						79–58	L2
138	September 6		Padres	L 3–8						79–59	L3
141	September 9		Braves	**W** 3–2						82–59	W3
142	September 10		Braves	L 3–6 (10)						82–60	L1
143	September 11		Braves	**W** 7–6						83–60	W1
144	September 13		@ Astros	**W** 5–1						84–60	W2
146	September 15		@ Astros	**W** 6–0						85–61	W1
150	September 19		Astros	**W** 9–2						86–64	W1
151	September 20		Astros	L 2–15						86–65	L1
152	September 21		Astros	**W** 2–1						87–65	W1
153	September 23		@ Braves	**W** 11–2						88–65	W2
154	September 24		@ Braves	L 2–3						88–66	L1
155	September 25		@ Braves	L 1–7						88–67	L2
158 (1)	September 29		@ Padres	L 1–7						90–68	L1
159 (2)	September 29		@ Padres	L 1–4						90–69	L2

October: 0–2 (Home: 0–2; Away: 0–0)

#	Date	Time (PT)	Opponent	Score	Win	Loss	Save	Time of Game	Attendance	Record	Box Streak

=== Detailed records ===
**National League**
Opponent	Home	Away	Total	Pct.	Runs scored	Runs allowed
**NL East**
Chicago Cubs	3–3	3–3	6–6	.500	43	57
Montreal Expos	4–2	3–3	7–5	.583	49	39
New York Mets	3–2	4–3	7–5	.583	38	34
Philadelphia Phillies	6–0	5–1	11–1	.917	49	15
Pittsburgh Pirates	3–3	3–3	6–6	.500	40	43
St. Louis Cardinals	5–1	4–2	9–3	.750	78	50
	**24–11**	**22–15**	**46–26**	**.639**	**297**	**238**
**NL West**
Atlanta Braves	6–3	5–4	11–7	.611	80	67
Cincinnati Reds	6–3	5–4	11–7	.611	75	61
Houston Astros	7–2	5–4	12–6	.667	85	69
**Los Angeles Dodgers**	—	—	—	—	—	—
San Diego Padres	2–7	4–5	6–12	.333	66	99
San Francisco Giants	3–6	2–7	5–13	.278	51	75
	**24–21**	**21–24**	**45–45**	**.500**	**357**	**371**

==== Month-by-Month ====
Month	Games	Won	Lost	Win %	RS	RA
April	20	14	6	0.700	91	75
May	26	18	8	0.692	115	76
June	28	14	14	0.500	100	100
July	28	11	17	0.393	107	132
August	30	20	10	0.545	121	94
September	29	14	14	0.500	116	121
October	2	0	2	0.000	4	8
Total	163	91	71	0.562	654	609

	Games	Won	Lost	Win %	RS	RA
Home	81	48	32	0.600	316	296
Road	82	43	39	0.524	338	313
Total	163	91	71	0.562	654	609

=== Composite Box ===
1983 Los Angeles Dodgers Inning–by–Inning Boxscore
Team	1	2	3	4	5	6	7	8	9	10	11	12	13	14	15	R	H	E
Opponents	80	53	71	69	67	89	64	66	39	8	1	1	0	0	1	609	1336	0
Dodgers	93	74	54	74	67	89	71	72	42	12	3	0	0	3	0	654	1358	0

=== Postseason Game log ===
1983 Postseason game log: 1–3 (Home: 1–1; Away: 0–2)
NL Chsmpionship Series vs. Philadelphia Phillies 1–3 (Home: 1–1; Away: 0–2)

#	Date	Time (PT)	Opponent	Score	Win	Loss	Save	Time of Game	Attendance	Series	Box/ Streak
1	October 4	5:20 p.m. PDT	Phillies	L 0–1	Carlton (1–0)	**Reuss** (0–1)	Holland (1)	2:17	55,524	PHI 1–0	L1
2	October 5	5:20 p.m. PDT	Phillies	**W** 4–1	**Valenzuela** (1–0)	Denny (0–1)	**Niedenfuer** (1)	2:44	55,967	TIE 1–1	W1
3	October 7	12:05 p.m. PDT	@ Phillies	L 2–7	Hudson (1–0)	**Welch** (0–1)	—	2:51	53,490	PHI 2–1	L1
4	October 8	5:20 p.m. PDT	@ Phillies	L 2–7	Carlton (2–0)	**Reuss** (0–2)	—	2:50	64,494	PHI 3–1	L2

== Starting Lineups ==
=== Regular Season ===
==== Batting Order ====
1983 Regular Season Batting Order game log
April

#	Date	Opponent	1st	2nd	3rd	4th	5th	6th	7th	8th	9th

May

#	Date	Opponent	1st	2nd	3rd	4th	5th	6th	7th	8th	9th
38	May 23	@ PHI									
39	May 24	@ PHI									
40	May 25	@ PHI									
45	May 30	PHI									
46	May 31	PHI									

June

#	Date	Opponent	1st	2nd	3rd	4th	5th	6th	7th	8th	9th
47	June 1	PHI									

July

#	Date	Opponent	1st	2nd	3rd	4th	5th	6th	7th	8th	9th

August

#	Date	Opponent	1st	2nd	3rd	4th	5th	6th	7th	8th	9th
119	August 19	PHI									
120	August 20	PHI									
121	August 21	PHI									
125	August 26	@ PHI									
126	August 27	@ PHI									
127	August 28	@ PHI									

September

#	Date	Opponent	1st	2nd	3rd	4th	5th	6th	7th	8th	9th

October

#	Date	Opponent	1st	2nd	3rd	4th	5th	6th	7th	8th	9th

==== Defensive Lineup ====
1983 Regular Season Defensive Lineup game log
April

#	Date	Opponent	C	1B	2B	3B	SS	LF	CF	RF	P

May

#	Date	Opponent	C	1B	2B	3B	SS	LF	CF	RF	P
38	May 23	@ PHI									
39	May 24	@ PHI									
40	May 25	@ PHI									
45	May 30	PHI									
46	May 31	PHI									

June

#	Date	Opponent	C	1B	2B	3B	SS	LF	CF	RF	P
47	June 1	PHI									

July

#	Date	Opponent	C	1B	2B	3B	SS	LF	CF	RF	P

August

#	Date	Opponent	C	1B	2B	3B	SS	LF	CF	RF	P
119	August 19	PHI									
120	August 20	PHI									
121	August 21	PHI									
125	August 26	@ PHI									
126	August 27	@ PHI									
127	August 28	@ PHI									

September

#	Date	Opponent	C	1B	2B	3B	SS	LF	CF	RF	P

October

#	Date	Opponent	C	1B	2B	3B	SS	LF	CF	RF	P

=== Postseason ===
==== Batting Order ====
1983 Postseason Batting Order game log
NL Championship Series: vs. Philadelphia Phillies

#	Date	Opponent	1st	2nd	3rd	4th	5th	6th	7th	8th	9th
1	October 4	PHI									
2	October 5	PHI									
3	October 7	@ PHI									
4	October 8	@ PHI									

==== Defensive Lineup ====
1983 Postseason Defensive Lineup game log
NL Championship Series: vs. Philadelphia Phillies

#	Date	Opponent	C	1B	2B	3B	SS	LF	CF	RF	P
1	October 4	PHI									
2	October 5	PHI									
3	October 7	@ PHI									
4	October 8	@ PHI									

== Game Umpires ==
=== Regular Season ===
1983 Regular Season Umpire game log
April

#	Date	Opponent	HP	1B	2B	3B

May

#	Date	Opponent	HP	1B	2B	3B
38	May 23	@ PHI	#2; Jerry Crawford	#8; Doug Harvey (crew chief)	#3; Jerry Dale	#14; Frank Pulli
39	May 24	@ PHI	#8; Doug Harvey (crew chief)	#3; Jerry Dale	#14; Frank Pulli	#2; Jerry Crawford
40	May 25	@ PHI	#3; Jerry Dale	#14; Frank Pulli	#2; Jerry Crawford	#8; Doug Harvey (crew chief)
45	May 30	PHI	#18; Dick Stello	#22; Joe West	(none)	#20; Ed Vargo (crew chief)
46	May 31	PHI	#22; Joe West	#20; Ed Vargo (crew chief)	(none)	#18; Dick Stello

June

#	Date	Opponent	HP	1B	2B	3B
47	June 1	PHI	#20; Ed Vargo (crew chief)	#18; Dick Stello	(none)	#22; Joe West

July

#	Date	Opponent	HP	1B	2B	3B

August

#	Date	Opponent	HP	1B	2B	3B
119	August 19	PHI	#10; John McSherry (crew chief)	#28; Fred Brocklander	#19; Terry Tata	#30; Randy Marsh
120	August 20	PHI	#28; Fred Brocklander	#19; Terry Tata	#30; Randy Marsh	#10; John McSherry (crew chief)
121	August 21	PHI	#19; Terry Tata	#30; Randy Marsh	#10; John McSherry (crew chief)	#28; Fred Brocklander
125	August 26	@ PHI	#26; Dave Pallone	#31; Bob Davidson	#15; Jim Quick	#17; Paul Runge (crew chief)
126	August 27	@ PHI	#31; Bob Davidson	#15; Jim Quick	#17; Paul Runge (crew chief)	#26; Dave Pallone
127	August 28	@ PHI	#15; Jim Quick	#17; Paul Runge (crew chief)	#26; Dave Pallone	#31; Bob Davidson

September

#	Date	Opponent	HP	1B	2B	3B

October

#	Date	Opponent	HP	1B	2B	3B

=== Postseason ===
1983 Postseason Umpire game log
NL Championship Series: vs. Philadelphia Phillies

#	Date	Opponent	HP	1B	2B	3B	LF	RF
1	October 4	PHI	#19; Terry Tata	#18; Dick Stello	#10; John McSherry	#23; Lee Weyer	#8; Doug Harvey (crew chief)	#2; Jerry Crawford
2	October 5	PHI	#18; Dick Stello	#10; John McSherry	#23; Lee Weyer	#8; Doug Harvey (crew chief)	#2; Jerry Crawford	#19; Terry Tata
3	October 7	@ PHI	#10; John McSherry	#23; Lee Weyer	#8; Doug Harvey (crew chief)	#2; Jerry Crawford	#19; Terry Tata	#18; Dick Stello
4	October 8	@ PHI	#23; Lee Weyer	#8; Doug Harvey (crew chief)	#2; Jerry Crawford	#19; Terry Tata	#18; Dick Stello	#10; John McSherry

== Player stats ==
=== Batting ===
==== Starters by position ====
Note: Pos = Position; G = Games played; AB = At bats; H = Hits; Avg. = Batting average; HR = Home runs; RBI = Runs batted in

Pos	Player	G	AB	H	Avg.	HR	RBI
C	Steve Yeager	113	335	68	.203	15	41
1B	Greg Brock	146	455	102	.224	20	66
2B	Steve Sax	155	623	175	.281	5	41
SS	Bill Russell	131	451	111	.246	1	30
3B	Pedro Guerrero	160	584	174	.298	32	103
LF	Dusty Baker	149	531	138	.260	15	73
CF	Ken Landreaux	141	481	135	.281	17	66
RF	Mike Marshall	140	465	132	.284	17	65

==== Other batters ====
Note: G = Games played; AB = At bats; H = Hits; Avg. = Batting average; HR = Home runs; RBI = Runs batted in

Player	G	AB	H	Avg.	HR	RBI
Derrel Thomas	118	192	48	.250	2	8
Rick Monday	99	178	44	.247	6	20
Jack Fimple	54	148	37	.250	2	22
Ron Roenicke	81	145	32	.221	2	12
Dave Anderson	61	115	19	.165	1	2
Rafael Landestoy	64	64	11	.172	1	1
Candy Maldonado	42	62	12	.194	1	6
R.J. Reynolds	24	55	13	.236	2	11
José Morales	47	53	15	.283	3	8
Mike Scioscia	12	35	11	.314	1	7
Gilberto Reyes	19	31	5	.161	0	0
Germán Rivera	13	17	6	.353	0	0
Sid Bream	15	11	2	.182	0	2
Cecil Espy	20	11	3	.273	0	1
Dave Sax	7	8	0	.000	0	1
Alex Taveras	10	4	0	.000	0	0

=== Pitching ===
==== Starting pitchers ====
Note: G = Games pitched; IP = Innings pitched; W = Wins; L = Losses; ERA = Earned run average; SO = Strikeouts

Player	G	IP	W	L	ERA	SO
Fernando Valenzuela	35	257.0	15	10	3.75	189
Jerry Reuss	32	223.1	12	11	2.94	143
Bob Welch	31	204.0	15	12	2.65	156

==== Other pitchers ====
Note: G = Games pitched; IP = Innings pitched; W = Wins; L = Losses; ERA = Earned run average; SO = Strikeouts

Player	G	IP	W	L	ERA	SO
Alejandro Peña	34	177.0	12	9	2.75	120
Burt Hooton	33	160.0	9	8	4.22	87
Rick Honeycutt	9	39.0	2	3	5.77	18
Sid Fernandez	2	6.0	0	1	6.00	9

==== Relief pitchers ====
Note: G = Games pitched; W = Wins; L = Losses; SV = Saves; ERA = Earned run average; SO = Strikeouts

Player	G	W	L	SV	ERA	SO
Steve Howe	46	4	7	18	1.44	52
Tom Niedenfuer	66	8	3	11	1.90	66
Dave Stewart	46	5	2	8	2.96	54
Joe Beckwith	42	3	4	1	3.55	50
Pat Zachry	40	6	1	0	2.49	36
Orel Hershiser	8	0	0	1	3.38	5
Rich Rodas	7	0	0	0	1.93	5
Ricky Wright	6	0	0	0	2.84	5
Larry White	4	0	0	0	1.29	5

== 1983 National League Championship Series ==
The National League West champion Dodgers faced the National League East champion Philadelphia Phillies in the 1983 NLCS and lost the series 3 games to 1. Noteworthy was that the Dodgers had won 11 of 12 games against the Phillies during the regular season.

=== Game 1 ===
October 4, Dodger Stadium

Team	1	2	3	4	5	6	7	8	9	R	H	E
Philadelphia	1	0	0	0	0	0	0	0	0	1	5	1
Los Angeles	0	0	0	0	0	0	0	0	0	0	7	0
W: Steve Carlton (1–0) L: Jerry Reuss (0–1) SV: Al Holland (1)
HRs: PHI – Mike Schmidt (1)

=== Game 2 ===
October 5, Dodger Stadium

Team	1	2	3	4	5	6	7	8	9	R	H	E
Philadelphia	0	1	0	0	0	0	0	0	0	1	7	2
Los Angeles	1	0	0	0	2	0	0	1	X	4	6	1
W: Fernando Valenzuela (1–0) L: John Denny (0–1) SV: Tom Niedenfuer (1)
HRs: PHI – Gary Matthews (1)

=== Game 3 ===
October 7, Veterans Stadium

Team	1	2	3	4	5	6	7	8	9	R	H	E
Los Angeles	0	0	0	2	0	0	0	0	0	2	4	0
Philadelphia	0	2	1	1	2	0	1	0	X	7	9	1
W: Charles Hudson (1–0) L: Bob Welch (0–1)
HRs: LAD – Mike Marshall (1); PHI – Gary Matthews (2)

=== Game 4 ===
October 8, Veterans Stadium

Team	1	2	3	4	5	6	7	8	9	R	H	E
Los Angeles	0	0	0	1	0	0	0	1	0	2	10	0
Philadelphia	3	0	0	0	2	2	0	0	X	7	13	1
W: Steve Carlton (2–0) L: Jerry Reuss (0–2)
HRs: LAD – Dusty Baker (1); PHI – Gary Matthews (3), Sixto Lezcano (1)

== Awards and honors ==
- 1983 Major League Baseball All-Star Game
  - Steve Sax starter
  - Pedro Guerrero reserve
  - Fernando Valenzuela reserve
- Silver Slugger Award
  - Fernando Valenzuela
- NL Pitcher of the Month
  - Burt Hooton (June 1983)
- NL Player of the Month
  - Dusty Baker (July 1983)
- NL Player of the Week
  - Dusty Baker (July 11–17)
  - Mike Marshall (Sep. 5–11)

== Farm system ==
Level	Team	League	Manager
AAA	Albuquerque Dukes	Pacific Coast League	Del Crandall; Terry Collins
AA	San Antonio Dodgers	Texas League	Terry Collins; Rick Ollar; Dave Wallace
High A	Lodi Dodgers	California League	Don LeJohn
**High A**	**Vero Beach Dodgers**	**Florida State League**	**Stan Wasiak**
Rookie	Lethbridge Dodgers	Pioneer League	Gail Henley
**Rookie**	**Gulf Coast Dodgers**	**Gulf Coast League**	**Gary LaRocque**

Teams in BOLD won League Championships

== Major League Baseball draft ==
The Dodgers drafted 35 players in the June draft and 17 in the January draft. Of those, six players would eventually play in the Major Leagues. They received two extra picks in the 2nd round as compensation for losing free agents Steve Garvey and Terry Forster.

The first-round pick in the June draft was pitcher Erik Sonberg of Wichita State University. He played six seasons in the minors and was 19–38 with a 6.20 ERA in 107 games. None of this years signings amounted to much of anything in the Majors.

1983 Draft Picks

=== January draft ===
Round	Name	Position	School	Signed	Career span	Highest level
1	Derek Lee	RHP	Sacramento City College	Yes	1983–1984	A
2	Todd Cobbs	RHP	Vincennes University	Yes	1983–1985	A
3	Patrick Sullivan	C	Sacramento City College	No; Blue Jays-1985	1985	Rookie
4	Mark Tindall	LHP	Sinclair Community College	No; Expos-1983	1983–1984	A-
5	Victor Marin	RHP	Chaffey College	No		
6	Randy Hamrick	LHP	Spartanburg Methodist College	Yes	1983–1985	A
7	John Partridge	RHP	Alvin Community College	No		
8	Rob Leary	RHP	College of San Mateo	No; Expos-1986	1986–1990	AAA
9	Kenneth Boone	RHP	Citrus College	No		
10	Theodore Parker	OF	Spartanburg Methodist College	No; Cardinals-1986	1986–1987	A
11	Scott Campbell	OF	Citrus College	No; Royals-1983	1983	Rookie
12	Mark Reynolds	OF	Austin Community College	Yes	1983–1986	AA
13	Wayne Kirby	OF	Newport News Apprentice School	Yes	1983–2001	**MLB**
14	Karl Ciamaichelo	SS		Yes	1983	Rookie
15	Gerald Robinson	C		No		

==== January Secondary phase ====
Round	Name	Position	School	Signed	Career span	Highest level
1	Dennis Woods	OF	Spartanburg Methodist College	No		
2	Rodney McCray	OF	West Los Angeles College	No; Padres-1984	1984–1993	**MLB**

=== June draft ===
Round	Name	Position	School	Signed	Career span	Highest level
1	Erik Sonberg	LHP	Wichita State University	Yes	1983–1989	AAA
2	Michael Cherry	RHP	The Citadel	Yes	1983–1986	AA
2	Robert Hamilton	RHP	Northeast High School	Yes	1983–1987	AA
2	Luis Lopez	C	Lafayette High School	Yes	1984–2004	**MLB**
3	Mitchell Moran	OF	University of Texas–Pan American	Yes	1983–1985	A
4	Bert Flores	OF	Mt. Whitney High School	Yes	1983–1986	A
5	Richard Thurman	RHP	Pepperdine University	Yes	1983	A
6	Scott May	RHP	University of Wisconsin–Stevens Point	Yes	1983–1995	**MLB**
7	Timothy Zaploski	3B	Boulder City High School	Yes	1983–1985	A-
8	Dave Eichborn	RHP	University of Miami	No		
9	Curtis Campbell	C	Gardena High School	Yes	1983–1984	Rookie
10	Chuck Bartlett	C	Mississippi State University	Yes	1983–1984	A
11	Joe Karmeris	3B	Reavis High School	Yes	1983–1985	A
12	Samuel Dotson	C	University of Memphis	Yes	1983	Rookie
13	Kenneth Harvey	2B	University of Richmond	Yes	1983–1987	AA
14	Barry Wohler	LHP	University of Minnesota	Yes	1984–1988	AA
15	Richard Ross	3B	North Park University	No		
16	Steven Shields	RHP	California State University, Los Angeles	Yes	1983–1985	A
17	Michael Blair	C	Jacksonville State University	Yes	1983–1984	A
18	Fred LaGroue	RHP	Holy Cross High School	No		
19	Christopher Chapman	OF	Southern University and A&M College	Yes	1983–1987	AA
20	Mark Stevens	OF	Citrus College	No		
21	Shawn Gilbert	SS	Agua Fria High School	No; Twins-1987	1987–2003	**MLB**
22	Mike Fetters	RHP	ʻIolani School	No; Angels-1986	1986–2004	**MLB**
23	Robert Rowen	LHP	Lassen College	Yes	1983–1988	AA
24	Vincent Beringhele	OF	University of California, Los Angeles	Yes	1983–1985	A
25	John Rexrode	RHP	Dallas Baptist University	Yes	1983–1984	A
26	Scott Parrish	RHP	Clemson University	No; Athletics-1984	1984–1985	A-
27	Dale Hamrick	3B	Spartanburg Methodist College	No; Braves-1984	1984	Rookie
28	Fernando Fernández	3B	Lennox High School	No		
29	Kevin Monk	1B	Fremont High School	No		
30	Daniel Kapea	LHP	Waipahu High School	No; Brewers-1988	1988	Rookie

==== June secondary phase ====
Round	Name	Position	School	Signed	Career span	Highest level
1	Jon Leake	3B	Sacramento City College	No; Brewers-1985	1985–1989	A
2	Terence Guzman	LHP	Ferrum College	No		
3	Tim Criswell	RHP	Georgia Perimeter College	Yes	1983–1987	AA
