= 1986 Los Angeles Dodgers season =

1986 Los Angeles Dodgers
- League: National League
- Division: West
- Ballpark: Dodger Stadium
- City: Los Angeles
- Record: 73–89 (.451)
- Divisional place: 5th
- Owners: Peter O'Malley
- General managers: Al Campanis
- Managers: Tommy Lasorda
- Television: KTTV (11); Vin Scully, Jerry Doggett, Ross Porter; Dodgervision; Eddie Doucette, Al Downing, Rick Monday
- Radio: KABC; Vin Scully, Jerry Doggett, Ross Porter; KTNQ; Jaime Jarrín, René Cárdenas

The 1986 Los Angeles Dodgers season was the 97th season for the Los Angeles Dodgers franchise in Major League Baseball (MLB), their 29th season in Los Angeles, California, and their 25th season playing their home games at Dodger Stadium. The Dodgers finished the season with a 73–89 record and fifth place finish. The Dodgers failed to defend their National League West title and suffered a losing season for the second time in three seasons, also missing the postseason in the process.

== Regular season ==
=== Season standings ===
NL West
Team	W	L	Pct.	GB	Home	Road
Houston Astros	96	66	.593	—	52‍–‍29	44‍–‍37
Cincinnati Reds	86	76	.531	10	43‍–‍38	43‍–‍38
San Francisco Giants	83	79	.512	13	46‍–‍35	37‍–‍44
San Diego Padres	74	88	.457	22	43‍–‍38	31‍–‍50
Los Angeles Dodgers	73	89	.451	23	46‍–‍35	27‍–‍54
Atlanta Braves	72	89	.447	23½	41‍–‍40	31‍–‍49

=== Record vs. opponents ===
1986 National League record Sources:
Team	ATL	CHC	CIN	HOU	LAD	MON	NYM	PHI	PIT	SD	SF	STL
Atlanta	—	9–3	6–12	5–13	10–8	4–7	4–8	4–8	5–7	12–6	7–11	6–6
Chicago	3–9	—	5–7	4–8	6–6	8–10	6–12	9–8	7–11	6–6	6–6	10–7
Cincinnati	12–6	7–5	—	4–14	10–8	7–5	4–8	7–5	10–2	9–9	9–9	7–5
Houston	13–5	8–4	14–4	—	10–8	8–4	5–7	6–6	6–6	10–8	9–9	7–5
Los Angeles	8–10	6–6	8–10	8–10	—	5–7	3–9	5–7	8–4	6–12	8–10	8–4
Montreal	7–4	10–8	5–7	4–8	5–7	—	8–10	8–10	11–7	4–8	5–7	9–9
New York	8–4	12–6	8–4	7–5	9–3	10–8	—	8–10	17–1	10–2	7–5	12–6
Philadelphia	8-4	8–9	5–7	6–6	7–5	10–8	10–8	—	11–7	6–6	9–3	6–12
Pittsburgh	7–5	11–7	2–10	6–6	4–8	7–11	1–17	7–11	—	8–4	4–8	7–11
San Diego	6–12	6–6	9–9	8–10	12–6	8–4	2–10	6–6	4–8	—	8–10	5–7
San Francisco	11–7	6–6	9–9	9–9	10–8	7–5	5–7	3–9	8–4	10–8	—	5–7
St. Louis	6–6	7–10	5–7	5–7	4–8	9–9	6–12	12–6	11–7	7–5	7–5	—

=== Opening Day starters ===
Name	Position
Mariano Duncan	Shortstop
Ken Landreaux	Center fielder
Bill Madlock	Third baseman
Greg Brock	First baseman
Mike Marshall	Right fielder
Franklin Stubbs	Left fielder
Mike Scioscia	Catcher
Steve Sax	Second baseman
Fernando Valenzuela	Starting pitcher

=== Notable transactions ===
- April 10, 1986: César Cedeño was signed as a free agent by the Dodgers.
- June 5, 1986: César Cedeño was released by the Dodgers.
- July 31, 1986: Joe Beckwith was purchased by the Dodgers from the Toronto Blue Jays.

=== Roster ===
1986 Los Angeles Dodgers
Roster
Pitchers: 45 Joe Beckwith; 27 Carlos Diaz; 52 Balvino Gálvez; 55 Orel Hershiser; 51 Brian Holton; 40 Rick Honeycutt; 43 Ken Howell; 49 Tom Niedenfuer; 26 Alejandro Peña; 48 Dennis Powell; 41 Jerry Reuss; 34 Fernando Valenzuela; 31 Ed Vande Berg; 35 Bob Welch	Catchers: 37 Jack Fimple; 14 Mike Scioscia; 29 Alex Treviño; Infielders: 10 Dave Anderson; 9 Greg Brock; 23 Enos Cabell; 25 Mariano Duncan; 33 Jeff Hamilton; 12 Bill Madlock; 3 Steve Sax; 20 Larry See; 38 Craig Shipley	Outfielders: 20 Ed Amelung; 46 Ralph Bryant; 7 César Cedeño; 47 José González; 28 Pedro Guerrero; 44 Ken Landreaux; 5 Mike Marshall; 17 Len Matuszek; 18 Bill Russell; 22 Franklin Stubbs; 45 Terry Whitfield; 21,51 Reggie Williams	Manager: 2 Tommy Lasorda; Coaches: 8 Joey Amalfitano; 54 Monty Basgall; 58 Mark Cresse; 37 Ben Hines; 11 Manny Mota; 16 Ron Perranoski

== Player stats ==
=== Batting ===
==== Starters by position ====
Note: Pos = Position; G = Games played; AB = At bats; H = Hits; Avg. = Batting average; HR = Home runs; RBI = Runs batted in

Pos	Player	G	AB	H	Avg.	HR	RBI
C	Mike Scioscia	122	374	94	.251	5	26
1B	Greg Brock	115	325	76	.234	16	52
2B	Steve Sax	157	633	210	.332	6	56
SS	Mariano Duncan	109	407	93	.229	8	30
3B	Bill Madlock	111	379	106	.280	10	60
LF	Franklin Stubbs	132	420	95	.226	23	58
CF	Reggie Williams	128	303	84	.277	4	32
RF	Mike Marshall	103	330	77	.233	19	53

==== Other batters ====
Note: G = Games played; AB = At bats; H = Hits; Avg. = Batting average; HR = Home runs; RBI = Runs batted in

Player	G	AB	H	Avg.	HR	RBI
Ken Landreaux	103	283	74	.261	4	29
Enos Cabell	107	277	71	.256	2	29
Bill Russell	105	216	54	.250	0	18
Dave Anderson	92	216	53	.245	1	15
Alex Treviño	89	202	53	.262	4	26
Len Matuszek	91	199	52	.261	9	28
Jeff Hamilton	71	147	33	.224	5	19
José González	57	93	20	.215	2	6
César Cedeño	37	78	18	.231	0	6
Ralph Bryant	27	75	19	.253	6	13
Pedro Guerrero	31	61	15	.246	5	10
Craig Shipley	12	27	3	.111	0	4
Larry See	13	20	5	.250	0	2
Terry Whitfield	19	14	1	.071	0	0
Jack Fimple	13	13	1	.077	0	2
Ed Amelung	8	11	1	.091	0	0

=== Pitching ===
==== Starting pitchers ====
Note: G = Games pitched; IP = Innings pitched; W = Wins; L = Losses; ERA = Earned run average; SO = Strikeouts

Player	G	IP	W	L	ERA	SO
Fernando Valenzuela	34	269.1	21	11	3.14	242
Bob Welch	33	235.2	7	13	3.28	183
Orel Hershiser	35	231.1	14	14	3.85	153
Rick Honeycutt	32	171.0	11	9	3.32	100

==== Other pitchers ====
Note: G = Games pitched; IP = Innings pitched; W = Wins; L = Losses; ERA = Earned run average; SO = Strikeouts

Player	G	IP	W	L	ERA	SO
Jerry Reuss	19	74.0	2	6	5.84	29
Alejandro Peña	24	70.0	1	2	4.89	46
Dennis Powell	27	65.1	2	7	4.27	31
Brian Holton	12	24.1	2	3	4.44	24

==== Relief pitchers ====
Note: G = Games pitched; W = Wins; L = Losses; SV = Saves; ERA = Earned run average; SO = Strikeouts

Player	G	W	L	SV	ERA	SO
Ken Howell	62	6	12	12	3.87	104
Tom Niedenfuer	60	6	6	11	3.71	55
Ed Vande Berg	60	1	5	0	3.41	42
Carlos Diaz	19	0	0	0	4.26	18
Joe Beckwith	15	0	0	0	6.87	13
Balvino Gálvez	10	0	1	0	3.92	11

== 1986 Awards ==
- 1986 Major League Baseball All-Star Game
  - Steve Sax reserve
  - Fernando Valenzuela reserve
- Gold Glove Award
  - Fernando Valenzuela
- Silver Slugger Award
  - Steve Sax
- TSN National League All-Star
  - Steve Sax
  - Fernando Valenzuela
- NL Player of the Month
  - Steve Sax (September 1986)
- NL Player of the Week
  - Fernando Valenzuela (Apr. 28 – May 4)
  - Fernando Valenzuela (May 19–25)
  - Franklin Stubbs (July 14–20)
  - Orel Hershiser (July 28 – Aug. 3)

== Farm system ==
Level	Team	League	Manager
AAA	Albuquerque Dukes	Pacific Coast League	Terry Collins
AA	San Antonio Dodgers	Texas League	Gary LaRocque
High A	Bakersfield Dodgers	California League	Don LeJohn
High A	Vero Beach Dodgers	Florida State League	Stan Wasiak
Rookie	Great Falls Dodgers	Pioneer League	Kevin Kennedy
**Rookie**	**Gulf Coast Dodgers**	**Gulf Coast League**	**Joe Alvarez**

Teams in BOLD won League Championships

== Major League Baseball draft ==
The Dodgers drafted 39 players in the June draft and 19 in the January draft. Of those, seven players would eventually play in the Major Leagues.

The Dodgers first round pick in the June draft was outfielder Michael White from Loudon High School in Loudon, Tennessee. In seven seasons of professional baseball (six of them in the Dodgers system), he hit .277 with 12 homers and 217 RBI.

The most notable pick in the draft was infielder Dave Hansen, selected in the 2nd round out of Rowland High School in California. Hansen played in the Majors from 1990 to 2007, and was one of the more accomplished pinch hitters in league history. He hit .260 with 35 homers and 222 RBI. After his playing career he became a Major League hitting coach.

1986 draft picks

=== January draft ===
Round	Name	Position	School	Signed	Career span	Highest level
1	Timothy Anderson	IF	Sacramento City College	Yes	1986–1987	A
2	Brian Flanagan	OF	Citrus College	No		
3	Lee Langley	OF	Linn–Benton Community College	Yes	1986–1997	A+
4	Adam Brown	C	Georgia Perimeter College	Yes	1986–1995	AAA
5	Stephen Carmarda	RHP	San Jacinto College	No		
6	Darren Lewis	OF	Chabot College	No; Athletics-1988	1988–2002	**MLB**
7	Mike Bundesen	LHP	Mott Community College	No		
8	Keith Hayes	C	University of Nebraska at Lincoln	No		
9	Brad Freking	LHP	William Rainey Harper College	No		
10	Ranfred Johnson	RHP	Los Angeles Harbor College	No; Mariners-1987	1987–1989	A
11	Mike Bledsoe	LHP	College of the Sequoias	No		
12	Elliott Quinones	OF	Gulf Coast Community College	No; Reds-1989	1989–1992	A
13	Mike Ripplinger	OF	Taft College	No		
14	Tim Anderson	OF	Georgia Perimeter College	No		
15	David Downey	OF	Muscatine Community College	No		
16	David Ray	C	Georgia Perimeter College	No		

==== January secondary phase ====
Round	Name	Position	School	Signed	Career span	Highest level
1	James Kating	C	Triton College	Yes	1986–1990	AA
2	Blake Butterfield	RHP	Mt. San Antonio College	No		
3	Pedro Borbón	LHP	Ranger College	No; White Sox-1988	1988–2006	**MLB**

=== June draft ===
Round	Name	Position	School	Signed	Career span	Highest level
1	Michael White	OF	Loudon High School	Yes	1986–1992	AAA
2	Dave Hansen	SS	Rowland High School	Yes	1986–2005	**MLB**
3	Mike Munoz	LHP	California Polytechnic State University	Yes	1986–2000	**MLB**
4	Michaell Pitz	RHP	University of the Pacific	Yes	1986–1991	AA
5	Kevin Campbell	RHP	University of Arkansas	Yes	1986–1995	**MLB**
6	Michael Siler	RHP	University of Portland	Yes	1986–1987	A
7	Daniel Henley	IF	University of Southern California	Yes	1986–1991	AAA
8	Joe Kesselmark	OF	Pace University	Yes	1986–1990	AAA
9	Henry Goshay	OF	Pacelli High School	Yes	1986–1989	A
10	Kenneth Riensche	RHP	St. Mary's College of California	Yes	1986–1987	Rookie
11	Kenneth King	RHP	University of North Carolina at Wilmington	Yes	1986–1988	A
12	Daniel Pena	LHP	University of Texas at Austin	Yes	1986–1988	A
13	Christopher Cerny	LHP	University of New Mexico	Yes	1986–1989	A
14	Danny Montgomery	2B	University of North Carolina at Charlotte	Yes	1986–1988	A
15	Theodore Dyson	1B	Arizona State University	No; Angels-1987	1987–1988	A
16	Anthony Ciccone	2B	Sonoma State University	Yes	1986	Rookie
17	Eric Mangham	OF	Florida State University	Yes	1986–1994	AAA
18	Clifton Smith	3B	South San Francisco High School	No		
19	Billy Brooks	RHP	Georgia Southern University	Yes	1986–1989	AAA
20	Stephen Wood	RHP	St. Mary's College of California	Yes	1986–1987	A
21	Jeffrey Brown	OF	Brigham Young University	Yes	1986–1988	AAA
22	Donald Poteet	3B	Augusta State University	Yes	1986	Rookie
23	John Knapp	3B	University of Iowa	Yes	1986–1990	A+
24	Billy Bartels	RHP	California State University, Fresno	Yes	1986–1988	A
25	Timothy Brown	OF	Monroe Area High School	No		
26	Paul Quantrill	RHP	Okemos High School	No; Red Sox-1989	1989–2005	**MLB**
27	Gregory Hornsby	OF	King High School	Yes	1986	Rookie
28	Scott Longaker	RHP	Petaluma High School	No		
29	Dave Proctor	RHP	Topeka High School	No; Mets-1988	1988–1992	AA
30	Craig Stiveson	RHP	Marin Catholic High School	No		
31	Chris Dominque	RHP	Westchester High School	No		
32	Gregory Reid	OF	Polytechnic High School	No; Athletics-1990	1990–1992	A

==== June secondary phase ====
Round	Name	Position	School	Signed	Career span	Highest level
1	Carlos Carrasco	RHP	Gavilan College	Yes	1987–1997	A+
2	Wade Taylor	RHP	Jefferson Davis Community College	No; Mariners-1987	1987–2000	**MLB**
3	Miguel Ferradas	C	Miami Dade College	Yes	1986–1987	A
4	Adrian Adkins	C	Middle Georgia College	No; Pirates-1989	1989	Rookie
5	Mike Bundesen	LHP	Mott Community College	No		
6	Keith Hayes	C	University of Nebraska–Lincoln	No		
7	Andrew Bourne	OF	Citrus College	Yes	1986	Rookie
