= Gilberto Reyes =

Dominican baseball player (born 1963)

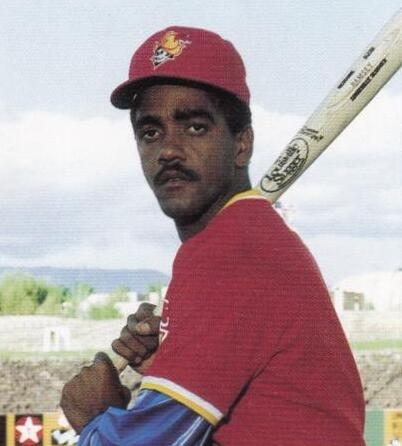
- Reyes with the Albuquerque Dukes c. 1987
- Catcher
- Born: December 10, 1963 (age 62); Santo Domingo, Dominican Republic
- Batted: Right Threw: Right

MLB debut
- June 11, 1983, for the Los Angeles Dodgers

Last MLB appearance
- October 6, 1991, for the Montreal Expos

MLB statistics
- Batting average: .202
- Home runs: 0
- Runs batted in: 14

CPBL statistics
- Batting average: .238
- Home runs: 0
- Runs batted in: 1
- Stats at Baseball Reference

Teams
- Los Angeles Dodgers (1983–1985, 1987–1988); Montreal Expos (1989, 1991); Mercuries Tigers (1992)

Gilberto Rolando Reyes Polanco (born December 10, 1963) is a Dominican former professional baseball catcher. He played in Major League Baseball (MLB) for the Los Angeles Dodgers and Montreal Expos.

== Career ==
Reyes was signed as an undrafted free agent by the Los Angeles Dodgers on January 15, 1980, and spent four seasons in the Dodgers farm system before making his major league debut in 1983. He alternated between AAA and the Majors for most of the next five seasons before the Dodgers traded him to the Montreal Expos in March 1989. After two seasons with the Expos, he bounced around the minor leagues for several more seasons before retiring after the 1999 season. His nickname as a player was "Onionhead."

== Early seasons ==
The Dodgers signed Reyes as an undrafted free agent in 1980. At the age of 16, Reyes made his pro debut for the Lethbridge Dodgers of the Pioneer league, appearing in six games. In 1980, he split time between Lethbridge and the Vero Beach Dodgers of the Florida State League. Vero Beach had no shortage of future major league talent. On the team was outfielder R.J. Reynolds, pitcher John Franco, First baseman Sid Bream, and shortstop Dave Anderson. During his time with Vero Beach, Reyes saw action at both first base and catcher. At this point, Reyes still had just a handful games of experience and was still struggling to get his batting average over the Mendoza Line. In order to get him more playing experience, for the 1982 season, the Dodgers farmed Reyes to the Lodi Dodgers of the California League. Three years into his career, Reyes had struggled to break past the single A level. However, with Lodi, he appeared in 127 games, more games than he'd played in the previous seasons combined. Reyes showed that his bat had some power, as he hit a career high 15 home runs and batted .281. He was the unquestioned starter at catcher. Reyes had a banner year in 1982, and big things were in store for him in 1983.

In 1983, Reyes began the season with the San Antonio Dodgers of the Texas League. San Antonio was the Dodgers double-A affiliate, meaning that finally Reyes had broken through the single A and rookie league levels. With San Antonio, he played alongside Dodgers prospects like first baseman Franklin Stubbs and pitchers Sid Fernandez and Ken Howell. Reyes journey didn't stop there. He soon was promoted to the Triple-A Albuquerque Dukes. There he played behind highly touted catching prospect Jack Fimple. At the age of 19, Reyes was one step away from the major league level. With Albuquerque, Reyes played 19 games at catcher and had a.938 fielding percentage and even took part in a double play.

== MLB debut ==
On June 11, 1983, Gilberto Reyes made his debut in a Saturday Night game versus the Cincinnati Reds. The game was played in Riverfront Stadium in Cincinnati, and Reyes made a little history. Filling in for the veteran Steve Yeager, Reyes went hitless in two at-bats. Reyes was later lifted for pinch hitter Ron Roenicke and Yeager replaced Reyes behind the plate. But history was made. At the age of 19, Reyes was the youngest player ever to play catcher for the Dodgers. Reyes played in 19 games before being re-assigned to the minors.

== MLB career and return to the minors ==
Over the course of the next few seasons, Reyes would bounce back between the majors and the minors. Playing for San Antonio in 1984, Reyes batted .303, the only time in his career he hit above the .300 mark. He appeared in a handful of games for the Dodgers in 1984 and 85, but spent the majority of his time playing for Albuquerque. In 1987, he split time in Albuquerque with Orlando Mercado, another young catching prospect who made his MLB debut at a young age. Reyes was 19 when he debuted for the Dodgers in 83, and Mercado was 20 when he debuted for the Seattle Mariners in 1984. However, the most bizarre part of Reyes career happened during the 1988 playoffs.

Reyes was part of the Dodgers post-season roster, but he was injured. As the Dodgers were facing the Oakland A's in the final game of the 1988 world series, Gilberto Reyes was flying in from his home in the Dominican Republic. He was walking in the stadium just as the champagne bottles were being uncorked. Though he did not appear in a single post season game, Reyes still received a world series ring.

Before spring training in 1989, the Dodgers traded Reyes to the Montreal Expos in exchange for pitcher Jeff Fischer. Reyes played briefly for Montreal in 1989, serving as a back-up to catchers Nelson Santovenia and Marty Pevey. During his time with Montreal's triple-A team in Indianapolis, he worked with Expos pitching prospects like Randy Johnson (Who'd go on to enjoy a hall of fame career) and Brian Barnes. Reyes would appear in 83 games for Montreal in 1991, splitting time with seasoned veteran Ron Hassey. However, at the end of the season, the Expos released Reyes. Reyes spent all of 1992 out of baseball, but signed a minor league deal to play for the Colorado Rockies Triple-A team, the Colorado Springs Sky Sox. When the season was over, the Rockies did not renew his contract, making Reyes a free agent. Reyes spent the next few season playing for Campeche in the Mexican League before making one last return to states. The Expos brought back Reyes to work with their young pitchers with the Ottawa Lynx. However, after a handful of games, Reyes was released in order to make room for younger catchers.

The main reason Reyes did not play any baseball is because while he was a member of the Montreal Expos in 1991, Reyes failed a drug test and was suspended for 60 games. However, this was Reyes first offense but an arbitrator ruled that Reyes should never have been suspended because this was his first offense.

Reyes spent the 1996 and 1997 seasons playing in Mexico, but returned to the states in 1998 to play for the Madison Black Wolf, an independent team playing in the Northern League. Teams in the Northern League were not affiliated with any of the teams in the majors. Like most teams in the league with was filled with cast offs, and ex stars trying to find their way back to the big leagues. Reyes was the starter for Madison, but he was also 34 years old and struggling at the plate. Reyes spent the 1999 season between playing in Mexico and for the Somerset Patriots of the Atlantic League, yet another independent league. The team was managed by former Cy Young winner Sparky Lyle featured ex-Cubs star Jerome Walton, who, like Reyes, was trying to find his way back to the big leagues. After the 1999 season was over, Reyes finally hung up his cleats for good and retired.

Honorary titles
Preceded by Scott Garrelts; 1982	Youngest Player in the National League; 1983	Succeeded by Dwight Gooden; 1984
