= Sid Bream =

American baseball player (born 1960)

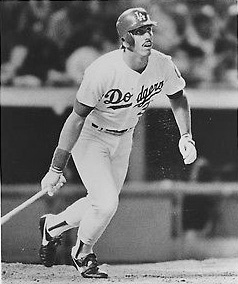
- First baseman
- Born: August 3, 1960 (age 66); Carlisle, Pennsylvania, U.S.
- Batted: Left Threw: Left

MLB debut
- September 1, 1983, for the Los Angeles Dodgers

Last MLB appearance
- July 27, 1994, for the Houston Astros

MLB statistics
- Batting average: .264
- Home runs: 90
- Runs batted in: 455
- Stats at Baseball Reference

Teams
- Los Angeles Dodgers (1983–1985); Pittsburgh Pirates (1985–1990); Atlanta Braves (1991–1993); Houston Astros (1994)

Sidney Eugene Bream (born August 3, 1960) is an American former professional baseball player who was a first baseman. From 1983 through 1994, he played in Major League Baseball (MLB) for the Los Angeles Dodgers (1983–85), Pittsburgh Pirates (1985–90), Atlanta Braves (1991–93), and Houston Astros (1994). He is best remembered for his game-winning run scored in the 1992 National League Championship Series (NLCS) that sent the Braves to the World Series.

After attending Liberty University, Bream was drafted by the Dodgers in 1981. Though thrice ranking among the home run leaders in the minor league, he batted no higher than .184 in limited playing time before getting traded to the Pirates in 1985. In Pittsburgh, he regularly played over 100 games a year for the Pirates, hitting at least 10 home runs in four full seasons (1986–88, 1990) with them. Defensively, he set an NL record for most assists in a season with 166 in 1986. After a knee injury cost him most of the 1989 season, he hit 15 home runs in 1990 as the Pirates reached the playoffs, losing to the Cincinnati Reds in the NLCS.

Bream reached the playoffs each of the next three seasons as well, though he did so with the Braves, who signed him as a free agent after the 1990 season. The Braves defeated Pittsburgh in the NLCS in 1991 and 1992, reaching the World Series two years in a row but losing it both times. Bream received most of the starts at first base in 1991 and 1992, hitting 11 and 10 home runs, respectively. He was getting the majority of the playing time at first base in 1993 until the Braves acquired Fred McGriff in July, relegating Bream to a reserve role for the rest of the year. Bream played one more year in 1994 with the Astros as a backup to Jeff Bagwell before retiring in 1995.

== Early life ==
Sidney Eugene Bream was born on August 3, 1960, in Carlisle, Pennsylvania. The third-oldest of six children, he grew up in Mount Holly Springs, a suburb of Carlisle. His family had their own Christian singing group, and Bream travelled all over Pennsylvania with them, eventually getting to sing as part of a family quartet once he got older. Since his father was a St. Louis Cardinals fan, Bream rooted for the same team growing up. He attended Carlisle High School, a Division 4A institution, where he played baseball and basketball. Bream hoped to be drafted by a Major League Baseball (MLB) team out of high school, but when none selected him, he decided to attend college instead. Both Temple University and Liberty University offered him full tuition scholarships, but Liberty's included room & board as well, and he chose to attend there.

== College ==
Bream was "one of Liberty’s first true athletic stars," according to the university's website. As a first baseman for the Liberty Flames, he was named an All-American by the National Association of Intercollegiate Athletics. He earned similar honors from the National Association of Basketball Coaches for his play on the court. Bream set Liberty records for highest career batting average (.435) and slugging percentage (.830); he holds five other baseball records at Liberty as well. In 1980, he played collegiate summer baseball with the Falmouth Commodores of the Cape Cod Baseball League, where he was named a league all-star, and was coached by Al Worthington, who was also Liberty's head baseball coach. Bream was selected by the Los Angeles Dodgers in the second round of the 1981 MLB draft.

== Los Angeles Dodgers ==
Bream started his professional career with the Vero Beach Dodgers of the Single-A Florida State League in 1981. In 70 games, he batted .327 with 35 runs scored, 85 hits, one home run, and 47 runs batted in (RBI). He split 1982 between Vero Beach and the San Antonio Dodgers of the Double-A Texas League. In 63 games with San Antonio, he batted .310 with 41 runs scored, 70 hits, four home runs, and 43 RBI. His numbers were even better at San Antonio, where he batted .320 with 43 runs scored, 83 hits, eight home runs, and 50 RBI in 70 games. Bream made it all the way to Triple-A before the end of the year, hitting a home run in three games with the Albuquerque Dukes of the Pacific Coast League (PCL).

In 1983, Bream spent the whole minor league season with Albuquerque, batting .307 with 149 hits. He led the PCL in home runs (32, tied with Kevin McReynolds) and RBI (118), also finishing third in runs scored (115, behind Gary Pettis's 138 and Lemmie Miller's 122) and walks (93, behind Gerry Davis's and Randy Ready's 99). He was a September callup by the Dodgers, who hoped he would be a helpful part of their team in the future. Bream made his major league debut on September 1, pinch-hitting for Steve Yeager in an 8–3 loss to the Montreal Expos. His first major league hit, against Tom Hume of the Cincinnati Reds on September 7, 1983, tied the score in the ninth inning as the Dodgers went on to win 7–3 in extra innings. In 15 games (11 at bats), Bream batted .182 with two hits and two RBI for the Dodgers in 1983.

Bream started the 1984 season with Albuquerque but was called up by the Dodgers in July. Used mainly as a pinch hitter, he batted .167 with three RBI in 19 games (18 at bats) before getting sent back to Albuquerque. Despite the month spent in the majors, Bream ranked among the PCL leaders in batting average (.343, fourth, behind Tony Brewer's .357, Ed Amelung's .351, and Tom O'Malley's .346), runs scored (82, tied with Joe Lansford for 10th), home runs (20, third, behind Rick Lancellotti's 29 and Alejandro Sánchez's 26), and RBI (90, sixth). He was called up by the Dodgers again in September, getting more starts at first base this month (six), though he batted .194 with three RBI on this callup.

In 1985, Bream was named the Dodgers starting first baseman. On April 12, he hit his first major league home run against Mike Krukow in a 4–1 loss to the San Francisco Giants. He hit three home runs in April but was sent to Albuquerque after batting .114. Bream also played games with the Dodgers from May 21 through June 4 and from June 28 through July 6, but none of these were starts, and he had just two hits in 10 at bats. At Albuquerque, he batted .370 with 51 runs scored and 57 RBI, tying with Pat Keedy and Randy Asadoor for fourth in the league with 17 home runs despite only playing in 85 games. On September 9, the Dodgers named him as a player to be named later in a trade to the Pittsburgh Pirates for disgruntled third baseman Bill Madlock, whom the Dodgers promptly signed to a contract extension.

== Pittsburgh Pirates ==
With the Pirates in 1985, Bream was used as the starting first baseman. His home run total (three) was identical to what it had been with the Dodgers earlier in the year, but Bream batted .284 with 15 RBI in the 26 games he played with Pittsburgh.

Bream remained the Pirates' first baseman in 1986, his first full season in the majors. In late June and July, he was part of a platoon system at first base with Mike Diaz, a right-handed hitter who got starts against left-handed pitchers. However, by August, Bream was getting most of the starts again regardless of which hand the pitcher threw with. He had four hits and two RBI on July 27 in a 7–0 win over San Francisco. In the first game of a doubleheader on August 16, he had four hits and four RBI, including a home run against Kevin Gross, in a 6–1 victory over the Philadelphia Phillies. On August 22, he had a season-high five hits and five RBI, including a two-run home run against Cliff Speck, in a 16–5 victory over the Atlanta Braves. He set an NL single-season record with 166 assists at first base, passing Bill Buckner's season-best of 161. Bream batted .268 with 140 hits and set what would be career highs in many categories, such as games played (154), at bats (522), runs scored (73), doubles (37), triples (five), home runs (16), RBI (77), stolen bases (13, caught seven times), and walks (60). He and Shawon Dunston tied for third in the National League (NL) in doubles, behind Von Hayes's 46 and Steve Sax's 43.

On April 20, 1987, Bream had four hits and three RBI, including home runs against Rick Aguilera and Randy Myers, in a 9–6 victory over the New York Mets. Against the Giants on May 1, he had two hits and three RBI, including a two-run home run against Mark Davis in a 4–2 victory. He had to leave a game against the Expos on June 24 after grounding out to end the sixth inning; Bream missed three games and did not get a start at first base until nine games later. On July 25, he had three hits and five RBI in a 9–3 victory over the San Diego Padres. That was his only game in 1987 in which he had four or more RBI, but he had six other three-RBI games. In 149 games, Bream hit 13 home runs, scored 64 runs, and drove in 65 runs. His 142 hits would be a career high, and his .275 average would be a career high for seasons in which he had more than 100 at bats. Bream batted fourth in the lineup in 1987 but was the worst cleanup hitter in the league, according to Baseball America.

Bream was again platooned at first base in 1988, this time with Randy Milligan, who got the Opening Day start because left-hander Shane Rawley was pitching for the Phillies. Ultimately, Bream would get the bulk of the starts, and Milligan was sent to the minor leagues for the rest of the season after July 29. Against the Cardinals on April 10, Bream hit a fourth-inning home run against Joe Magrane, then doubled against Todd Worrell in the top of the 10th inning, scoring the eventual winning run one batter later when Mike LaValliere drove him in with another double. In the 12th inning of a 1–1 tie against the Padres on May 6, he hit a walkoff home run against Davis, giving the Pirates a 4–1 victory. Against the Expos on June 23, he had three hits and four RBI, including a two-run home run against John Dopson in a 6–4 victory. On August 9, he had two hits and four RBI in a 10–8 victory over the Expos. He was batting .294 through August 15, but he batted .174 in his final 36 games. In 148 games (462 at bats), he batted .264 with 50 runs scored, 122 hits, 10 home runs, and 65 RBI. Bream tied his career high with 37 doubles, fourth in the NL behind Andrés Galarraga's 42, Rafael Palmeiro's 41, and Chris Sabo's 40.

Entering the 1989 season, John Perrotto of the Beaver County Times reported that Bream might platoon with Gary Redus. Bream played the first nine games of the season at first for Pittsburgh before tearing cartilage in his right knee on April 14 while trying to run back to first base. After a month on the disabled list, he returned on May 14 but played only 10 games before having to undergo season-ending knee surgery. In only 19 games, he batted .222 with no home runs and four RBI.

Bream made a healthy return in 1990, but the platoon with Redus became a reality. He had four hits on June 12 but did not score a run or drive one in; however, the Pirates beat the Cardinals 6–3. Against the Expos on July 24, he had three hits and three RBI, including a two-run home run against Gross as the Pirates won 5–3. On July 31, Bream had three RBI, including a two-run home run against Shawn Boskie, in a 9–1 victory over the Cubs that moved Pittsburgh into a tie with Chicago for the NL East lead. Four days later, he had four hits and three RBI, including a two-run home run against Don Carman as the Pirates beat the Phillies 11–0. Five times he had a season-high three RBI. In 147 games (389 at bats), Bream batted .270 with 39 runs scored, 105 hits, 15 home runs, and 67 RBI. Sportswriter J. Brady McCollough said that Bream "was a solid everyday player" in 1990. It had taken three knee operations to get Bream back in playing shape after his injuries in 1989; for his perseverance, he was named the winner of MLB's Hutch Award after the season.

The Pirates won the NL East and faced the Reds in the NL Championship Series (NLCS). Bream only played in four of the six games of the series (starting just two), but he batted .500. In Game 1, he hit a two-run, fourth-inning home run against José Rijo that tied the game; Pittsburgh scored the only other run to win by a score of 4–3. The Pirates lost the series in six games.

Following the season, Bream became a free agent. He wanted to stay with the Pirates, as he and his family had moved into a newly-built home in the area, but he wanted more money than the Pirates were willing to give him. As a result, he signed with the Atlanta Braves. "It was a very, very difficult time for my wife, Michele, and I," Bream recalled in 2017. "We went to bed that night and literally cried all night thinking that we were leaving Pittsburgh." Gene Collier of the Pittsburgh Post-Gazette wrote in 2006 that Sean Casey was "the first real first baseman to walk into [the Pirates' clubhouse] in about 16 years, or since the fate-torturing departure of Sid Bream."

== Atlanta Braves ==
=== 1990–92 ===
After batting .241 in April 1991, Bream turned into one of Atlanta's best hitters, batting .306 with seven home runs and 26 RBI over the next two months. Facing the Pirates on May 17, he hit his first career grand slam against Bob Patterson in a 9–3 victory. He had to leave a game on June 18 while running the bases, however, and after pinch-hitting on June 25, he underwent knee surgery. He pinch-hit in two games in early August, but those were his only appearances until August 29, when he again took over as the regular first baseman. He struggled in his return, batting .186 with two home runs from August 29 through the remainder of the year. In the midst of his struggles, he did have a five-RBI game against the Dodgers, including a grand slam against Ramon Martinez in a 9–1 victory. In 91 games, he batted .253 with 32 runs scored, 67 hits, 11 home runs, and 45 RBI.

Atlanta reached the playoffs, winning the NL West. In Game 3 of the NLCS against the Pirates, Bream entered as part of a double switch in the eighth inning and hit a three-run home run against Rosario Rodríguez in a crucial 10–3 victory. Bream only played four (and only started two) of the seven NLCS games, batting .300 as the Braves defeated the Pirates, becoming the first NL team to win the pennant after finishing in last place the year before. Yet in the World Series, he started each game as the Twins' starters were all right-handed. In Game 7, Bream came to bat with one out in the eighth inning with the bases loaded and the ballgame scoreless. He hit into an unlikely 3–2–3 double play against Jack Morris to end the inning, and the Twins went on to win the game in 10 innings, winning the series 4–3. In the World Series, Bream had a mere three hits in 24 at bats.

In 1992, Bream platooned with Brian Hunter at first base. On June 7, he had three RBI in a 9–4 victory over the Padres. He batted .250 in the first half of the season, though with only two home runs and 21 RBI. Assessing the likelihood of a Twins-Braves World Series rematch, Jim Donaghy of the Associated Press wrote in midseason that part of the key for the Braves was "a better second half from David Justice and Sid Bream." After the All-Star break, Bream's average rose to .272, and he hit eight home runs. On August 8, he had four hits and four RBI, including a solo home run against Jim Gott in a 12–2 win over the Dodgers. The next day, he again had four RBI as the Braves beat the Dodgers 4–3. In 125 games (372 at bats), he batted .261 with 30 runs scored, 97 hits, 10 home runs, and 61 RBI.

=== The Slide ===
For the second year in a row, Atlanta won the NL West and faced the Pirates in the NLCS. In Game 1 of the series, Bream had two hits, scored two runs, and had an RBI in a 5–1 victory. He hit a home run against Tim Wakefield in Game 3, which the Braves lost 3–2. However, the most famous moment of Bream's career came in Game 7.

The Pirates carried a 2–0 lead into the bottom of the ninth inning under the pitching of their ace, Doug Drabek, needing just three outs to make the World Series. However, Drabek gave up a leadoff double to Terry Pendleton, then allowed another runner, David Justice, on an infield error by second baseman José Lind. After Drabek walked Bream to load the bases, Pirates manager Jim Leyland pulled him out of the game. Reliever Stan Belinda replaced him on the mound, and managed to get two outs, despite giving up a run on a sacrifice fly by Ron Gant. Then, Braves third-string catcher Francisco Cabrera belted a single to left field, and Justice scored easily to tie the game. Pirates left fielder and eventual NL Most Valuable Player Barry Bonds fielded the ball as Bream, one of the slowest runners in baseball, went as fast as he could towards home plate. Bonds's throw arrived first, but it was slightly offline and bounced on its way towards the first-base line. As soon as catcher Mike LaValliere received the ball, he desperately lunged toward the plate to tag Bream out, but Bream was able to slide just underneath the tag to score the winning run and send the Braves to their second World Series in a row. In the aftermath of the play, the family received a death threat from an angry Pirates fan, and their house in Wexford was toilet-papered. Some fans called the play the "Bream Curse," as the Pirates endured many losing seasons afterwards. Bream, however, believes it was an act of God that led to him beating the throw to the plate. Twenty-one years later, Lee Jenkins of Sports Illustrated called it "the most damaging play in the history of the Pirates."

=== 1992 World Series ===
The Braves faced the Toronto Blue Jays in the World Series. Bream started five of the six games, scoring a run in Game 2 and getting two hits in Game 3. He batted .200 in the series, which Toronto won in six games. "It's something we can tell our grandkids," reported Bream. "We played in two of the greatest World Series of all time. But at the same time, it's hard to tell your grandkids, 'We're the ones who never won.'"

=== 1993 ===
Bream was Atlanta's starting first baseman in 1993, but he got off to a poor start. "I've been struggling, very much so," he said in June. One bright spot came on May 8 when he pinch-hit for Cabrera against Willie Blair of the Colorado Rockies. On a pitch in which he checked his swing, Bream hit a grand slam through the thin air at Mile High Stadium, tying a game the Braves had trailed 6–0 but won 8–7. He had a four-hit, three RBI game on June 21 in an 8–1 victory over the Phillies, but the performance only raised his batting average to .243. On July 19, the Braves acquired first baseman and defending NL home run leader Fred McGriff from the Padres, and Bream was relegated to pinch-hitting for the rest of the season. In 117 games (277 at bats), he batted .260 with 33 runs scored, 72 hits, nine home runs, and 35 RBI. He reached the playoffs for the third year in a row as Atlanta won the NL West. This time, he made just one appearance in the NLCS against the Phillies, entering as part of a double switch in Game 2, singling against Larry Andersen in the ninth, and scoring a run in Atlanta's 14–3 victory. The Braves lost the series in six games, and Bream became a free agent after the season.

== Houston Astros ==
On January 26, 1994, Bream signed with the Houston Astros, who used him as a pinch hitter and a backup at first base to Jeff Bagwell. In a start against the Cubs on July 3, he had a season-high three hits and one RBI in a 12–6 victory. His last appearance of the year came on July 27, when he pinch-hit for John Hudek in the 10th inning of a game against the Reds and singled against Jeff Brantley in Houston's 12-inning, 7–1 victory. The 1994 MLB strike brought a premature end to the season on August 12. In 46 games (61 at bats), Bream batted .344 with seven runs scored, 21 hits, no home runs, and seven RBI. He retired in 1995.

== Career statistics ==
In 1088 games over 12 seasons, Bream compiled a .264 batting average (819 hits in 3108 at bats) with 351 runs scored, 191 doubles, 12 triples, 90 home runs, 455 RBI, 50 stolen bases, 353 walks, 450 strikeouts, a .336 on-base percentage, and a .420 slugging percentage. Defensively, he recorded a .992 fielding percentage. In 28 postseason games, he batted .250 (20 hits in 80 at bats) with nine runs scored, three home runs, eight RBI, and 12 walks.

== Personal life ==
Bream retired to Zelienople, a northern suburb of Pittsburgh, where he lives with his wife, Michele. The couple have four children, including an adopted daughter Shay from Russia. One of their sons, Austin Leyland, was named in honor of Jim Leyland, Bream's last manager with the Pirates, and also attended Liberty University. A son, Tyler, attended Liberty University and was drafted by the Arizona Diamondbacks in the 42nd round (1264th overall) in 2011, playing for two seasons in their minor league system. Another son, Michael, attended Liberty University.

After retiring, Bream became a motivational speaker for Christian Sports International. In 2003, he joined "Battin' 1000," a Pro-Life group composed of several former baseball celebrities. Bream was hired in 2008 to be the hitting coach for the State College Spikes, a Pirates' affiliate in the New York-Penn League, but he only served one year in that capacity. The Pittsburgh Post-Gazette reported it was because he wanted to spend more time with his family; Sports Illustrated said it was because "fans complained," remembering "The Slide." Bream can still be booked as a motivational speaker from Christian Speakers 360, and he serves as a corporate chaplain for PGT Trucking. Though still a Pirates fan, Bream has a painting of "The Slide" hanging in his living room. He is an avid hunter, and several of the other Pirates have been hunting with him. He is close friends with several of his teammates from the Pirates, including Drabek.
