= Al Campanis =

American baseball player and executive (1916–1998)

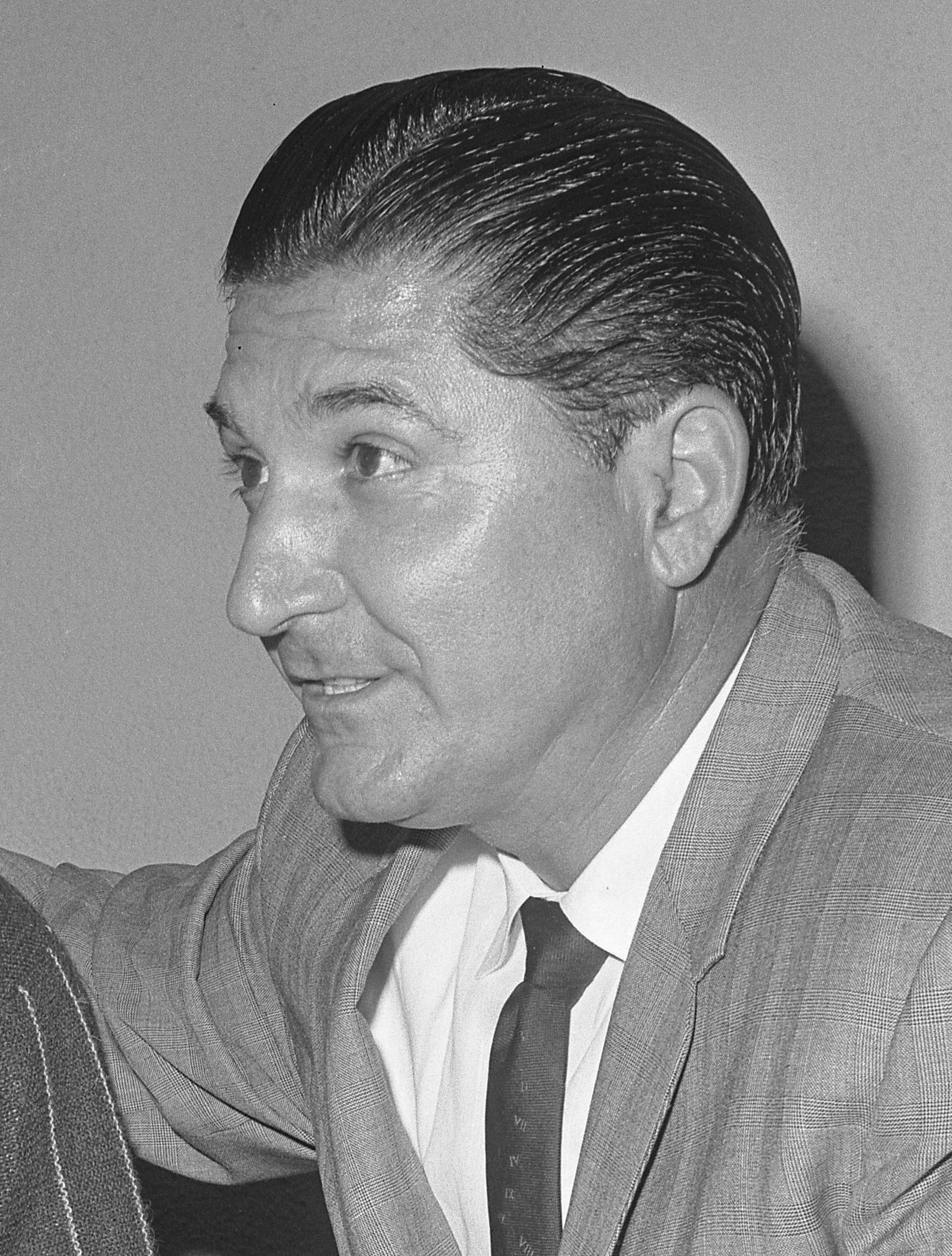
- Campanis in 1964
- Second baseman / General manager
- Born: November 2, 1916; Kos, Dodecanese Islands, Kingdom of Italy, now Greece
- Died: June 21, 1998 (aged 81); Fullerton, California, U.S.
- Batted: Switch Threw: Right

MLB debut
- September 23, 1943, for the Brooklyn Dodgers

Last MLB appearance
- October 3, 1943, for the Brooklyn Dodgers

MLB statistics
- Batting average: .100
- Hits: 2
- Runs scored: 3
- Stats at Baseball Reference

Teams
- As player: Brooklyn Dodgers (1943); As general manager: Los Angeles Dodgers (1968–1987)

Career highlights and awards
- World Series champion (1981)

Alexander Sebastian Campanis (Greek: Αλέξανδρος Σεβαστιανός Καμπάνης; November 2, 1916 – June 21, 1998) was an American executive in Major League Baseball (MLB). He had a brief major league playing career, as a second baseman for the Brooklyn Dodgers in 1943; he was the first Greek player in MLB history. Campanis is most famous for his position as general manager of the Los Angeles Dodgers from 1968 to 1987, from which he was fired on April 8, 1987, as a result of controversial remarks regarding black people in baseball made during an interview on Nightline two days earlier.

== Early life ==
Al Campanis was born to Greek-speaking parents in Kos, a small island within the Dodecanese Islands, on November 2, 1916. Kos has been part of Greece since 1947, although, at the time of Campanis' birth, it belonged to Italy.

He moved with his family to New York City at age 6. He attended New York University, graduating in 1940.

== Baseball ==
After graduating, Campanis became a professional baseball player, signing with the Brooklyn Dodgers. He was sent to play with several minor league teams: the Macon Peaches in 1940, Reading Brooks in 1941, Knoxville Smokies in 1942, and Montreal Royals in 1943. He eventually played for the Brooklyn Dodgers as a second baseman for seven games late in their 1943 season. He then served in the U.S. Navy in World War II, reaching the rank of Chief Petty Officer.

After returning from the war, Campanis rejoined the Montreal Royals. With Montreal in 1946, Campanis played 116 games at shortstop and was teammates with Jackie Robinson, who played 119 games at second base. Campanis remained with Montreal in 1947, while Robinson played for the Dodgers, breaking the baseball color line. Campanis' final season playing professional baseball was 1948, when he was player-manager of the Nashua Dodgers in New Hampshire. Pitcher Dan Bankhead, who in 1947 had become the first African American pitcher in MLB, won 20 games for Nashua in 1948.

Campanis soon afterward became a scout for the Dodgers, then eventually their scouting director. While a scout, he notably discovered future Hall of Famers Roberto Clemente and Sandy Koufax. Campanis moved with the team to Los Angeles when they became the Los Angeles Dodgers in 1958.

In 1968, Campanis became the Dodgers' general manager. In one of his first trades as general manager, Campanis traded his own son Jim, to the Kansas City Royals for two minor leaguers. Under Campanis, the Dodgers reached the World Series four times: 1974, 1977, 1978, and 1981. They lost the first three, before finally winning in 1981.

=== Record as general manager ===
Team	Year	Regular season					Postseason			
Team	Year	Games	Won	Lost	Win %	Finish	Won	Lost	Win %	Result
LAD	1969	162	85	77	.525	4th in NL West	–	–	–	–
LAD	1970	162	87	74	.540	2nd in NL West	–	–	–	–
LAD	1971	162	89	73	.549	2nd in NL West	–	–	–	–
LAD	1972	155	85	70	.548	2nd in NL West	–	–	–	–
LAD	1973	162	95	66	.590	2nd in NL West	–	–	–	–
LAD	1974	162	102	60	.630	1st in NL West	4	5	.444	Lost World Series (OAK)
LAD	1975	162	88	74	.543	2nd in NL West	–	–	–	–
LAD	1976	162	92	70	.568	2nd in NL West	–	–	–	–
LAD	1977	162	98	64	.605	1st in NL West	5	5	.500	Lost World Series (NYY)
LAD	1978	162	95	67	.586	1st in NL West	5	5	.500	Lost World Series (NYY)
LAD	1979	162	79	83	.488	3rd in NL West	–	–	–	–
LAD	1980	163	92	71	.564	2nd in NL West	–	–	–	–
LAD	1981	57	36	21	.632	1st in NL West	10	6	.625	Won World Series (NYY)
LAD	1981	53	27	26	.509	1st in NL West	10	6	.625	Won World Series (NYY)
LAD	1982	162	88	74	.543	2nd in NL West	–	–	–	–
LAD	1983	163	91	71	.562	1st in NL West	1	3	.250	Lost NLCS (PHI)
LAD	1984	162	79	83	.488	4th in NL West	–	–	–	–
LAD	1985	162	95	67	.586	1st in NL West	2	4	.333	Lost NLCS (STL)
LAD	1986	162	73	89	.451	5th in NL West	–	–	–	–
LAD	1987	3	0	3	.000	(fired)	–	–	–	–
Total		2,862	1,576	1,286	.551		27	28	.491	

== Racially insensitive comments ==
The impetus for Campanis being invited onto Nightline came because of timing. On that day of April 6, 1987, the Marvin Hagler vs. Sugar Ray Leonard middleweight championship fight was occurring in Las Vegas, and the end of the fight would coincide roughly around the time that the show would be televised, which provided the program with a chance to attract viewers by stating the outcome of the fight live. A network editor provided the suggestion to do a tribute piece on Jackie Robinson as a way to fill time before finding out the winner of the fight, since the 40th anniversary of Robinson's debut in the majors was on the 15th. The tribute would have a taped package with announcer Red Barber and Rachel Robinson for the taped segment while having a live conversation with Don Newcombe, Roger Kahn and Campanis (as suggested by producer Rick Kaplan) that would have each person chime in from different places in the country. However, Campanis and Kahn would end up being the only two guests to be able to make the full segment, as Newcombe suffered a late plane arrival and Kahn had trouble with floods, but made it to the interview just in time, complete with Campanis being filmed for his segment at the Astrodome (where the Dodgers were playing that night); it was stated later that people around Campanis were wary of the idea of him being interviewed by host Ted Koppel, since Campanis was described as having a tendency of "mangling the language" with confusing statements. The segment with Campanis started after the taped portion ended, which closed with Rachel Robinson stating, "It's not coincidental that baseball in the 40-year period has not been able to integrate at any other level other than the players' level - we have a long way to go."

Campanis, who had played alongside Robinson and was known for being close to him, was being interviewed about the subject. Nightline anchorman Ted Koppel asked him why, at the time, there had been few black managers and no black general managers or owners in Major League Baseball. Campanis's reply was: "I truly believe that they may not have some of the necessities to be, let's say, a field manager, or, perhaps, a general manager." Later in the interview, to defend his views when pressed by Koppel, Campanis asked: "Why are black men or black people not good swimmers? Because they don't have the buoyancy." Koppel gave Campanis several opportunities to clarify or back down from his remarks, asking Campanis, "Do you really believe that?" Koppel also pointed out that much of what Campanis was saying "sounds like the same kind of garbage we heard 40 years ago." Campanis doubled down on his views, suggesting that African Americans "certainly are short" on individuals with strong decision-making capabilities, asking Koppel: "How many quarterbacks do you have? How many pitchers do you have that are black?" Campanis was fired less than 48 hours later.

The controversy was especially heated when it was pointed out that Campanis had participated in the decision over who would replace Walter Alston as the manager of the Dodgers. It had been a choice between the two coaches at the time, Tommy Lasorda and Jim Gilliam, and it raised the question of whether Gilliam had been passed over because he was black.

In an interview the next year, Campanis attempted to clarify that he was referring to the lack of African-Americans with experience in these areas, rather than their innate abilities. He also said that he was "wiped out" when the interview took place and therefore not entirely himself. Many other figures in baseball, such as Lasorda and African-American and Latin players who played for the Dodgers, have also spoken in Campanis's defense.

Two months after the episode aired, Major League Baseball hired sociologist and civil right activist Harry Edwards to begin a diversity-increasing initiative among leadership in the sport. Edwards stated later that one of the first people to call him was Campanis, who asked how he could help and that if his comments opened the door for help, then "it was worth it." Edwards later said of Campanis:

He didn't get a raw deal, he got the deal he ordered up, but he was one of the most honorable men in the whole process and he handled it with class, with conscientiousness and with courage.

In 1988, Campanis himself added similarly: "Time has diffused the immediate hurt of April 6", and that "It has turned out to be a plus for baseball and myself."

== Personal life and family ==
Campanis had two sons, baseball player Jim and George.

=== Death ===
Campanis died on June 21, 1998, at his home in Fullerton, California, from coronary artery disease, at age 81. Campanis was survived by his sons, George and Jim, five grandchildren and three great-grandchildren. He was interred in the mausoleum crypt at Loma Vista Memorial Park in Fullerton.

== Works ==
- Campanis, Al (1954). The Dodger Way to Play Baseball. No Publisher Noted. ASIN B000HKV8J0.
- Campanis, Al (1980). Play Ball with Roger the Dodger. Putnam. ISBN 0399207104.

Sporting positions
Preceded by Fresco Thompson	Los Angeles Dodgers General Manager; 1968–1987	Succeeded by Fred Claire
