= Dave Sax =

American baseball player (born 1958)

- Catcher
- Born: September 22, 1958 (age 67); Sacramento, California, U.S.
- Batted: Right Threw: Right

MLB debut
- September 1, 1982, for the Los Angeles Dodgers

Last MLB appearance
- April 26, 1987, for the Boston Red Sox

MLB statistics
- Batting average: .267
- Home runs: 1
- Runs batted in: 8
- Stats at Baseball Reference

Teams
- Los Angeles Dodgers (1982–1983); Boston Red Sox (1985–1987)

David John Sax (born September 22, 1958) is a former Major League Baseball player and the older brother of All-Star second baseman Steve Sax. He played as a catcher for the Los Angeles Dodgers (1982–83) and Boston Red Sox (1985–87) in his brief major league career.

== Career ==
His lone major league home run came against Jimmy Key in an important game against the Toronto Blue Jays on September 21, 1986. It helped the eventual American League East champion Red Sox defeat their rival 3-2 in a late season game.

Sax also played winter ball with the Navegantes del Magallanes club of the Venezuelan League in the 1983–84 season. He later made a brief appearance for the Daytona Beach Explorers of the Senior Professional Baseball Association in 1991.

== Personal life ==
Dave Sax is the brother of former Major League Baseball player Steve Sax, who also played for the Dodgers from 1981 to 1988.

His son, David Sax Jr. was seen on an episode of Intervention in 2015 and died in July 2023.

A nephew, Nick Sogard, plays in Major League Baseball for the Boston Red Sox.
