= Germán Rivera =

Puerto Rican baseball player (born 1960)

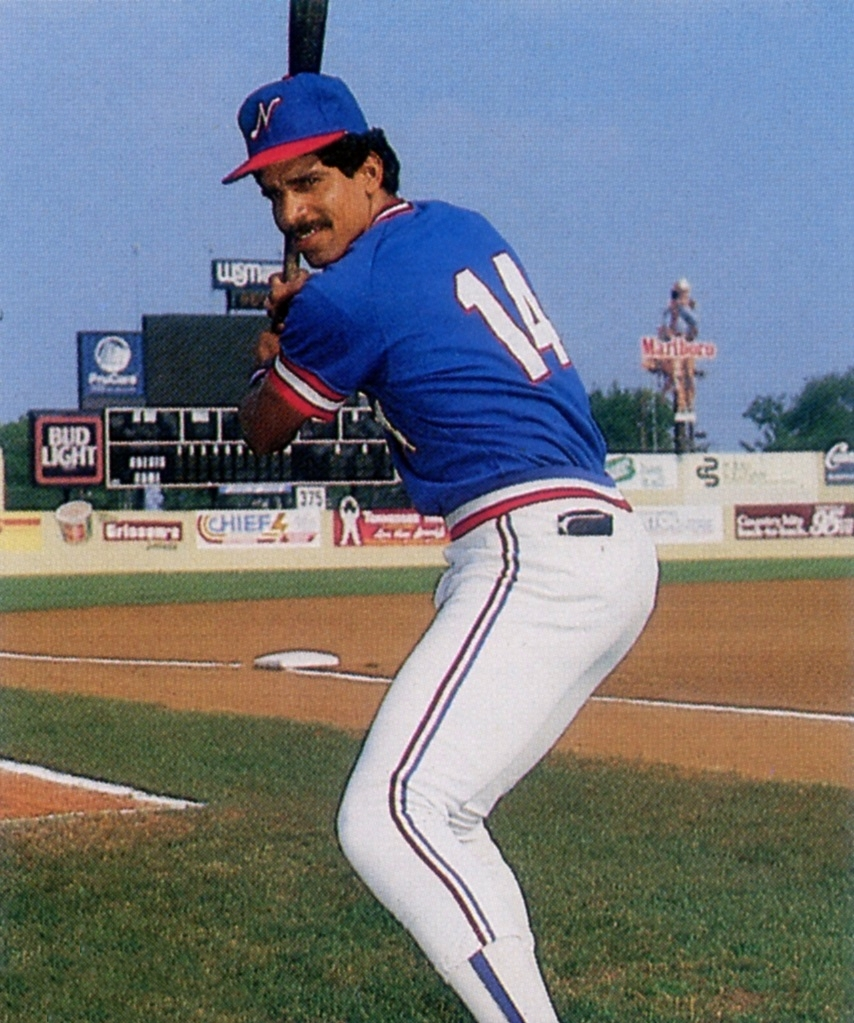
- Rivera with the Nashville Sounds in 1986
- Third baseman
- Born: July 6, 1960 (age 65); Santurce, Puerto Rico
- Batted: Right Threw: Right

MLB debut
- September 2, 1983, for the Los Angeles Dodgers

Last MLB appearance
- September 28, 1985, for the Houston Astros

MLB statistics
- Batting average: .257
- Home runs: 2
- Runs: 24

NPB statistics
- Batting average: .260
- Home runs: 25
- Runs batted in: 79
- Stats at Baseball Reference

Teams
- Los Angeles Dodgers (1983–1984); Houston Astros (1985); Kintetsu Buffaloes (1989)

Germán Rivera Díaz (born July 6, 1960) is a Puerto Rican former professional baseball third baseman. He played for the Los Angeles Dodgers and Houston Astros of Major League Baseball (MLB) in the 1980s.

== Career ==
Rivera was signed as an undrafted free agent by the Los Angeles Dodgers on December 20, 1977. He played in the minors for the Lethbridge Dodgers (1978), Clinton Dodgers (1978–1979), Lodi Dodgers (1979, 1981), Vero Beach Dodgers (1980), San Antonio Dodgers (1982) and Albuquerque Dukes (1982–1985).

He was selected by the Oakland Athletics in the rule 5 draft in 1983, but returned to the Dodgers at the end of spring training when he failed to make the Athletics roster.

Rivera made his major league debut as a defensive replacement on September 2, 1983 against the Montreal Expos and made his first start the next day. He was the Dodgers opening day starter at third base in 1984, playing in 94 games that season and finishing with a .260 batting average.

On July 15, 1985 he was traded to the Houston Astros (with Rafael Montalvo) in exchange for Enos Cabell. Spent most of the season with the Astros AAA team, the Tucson Toros and only appeared in 13 games for the Astros.

Rivera bounced around the minors for a few years after that, playing with the Nashville Sounds & Toledo Mud Hens (Detroit Tigers organization -1986–1987), Denver Zephyrs (Milwaukee Brewers organization -1988), Richmond Braves (Atlanta Braves organization -1989), Indianapolis Indians (Montreal Expos organization-1990). After that he played in Japan (Kintetsu Buffaloes) for a year.

== See also ==
- List of Major League Baseball players from Puerto Rico
