= Pedro Guerrero (first baseman/outfielder) =

Dominican baseball player (born 1956)

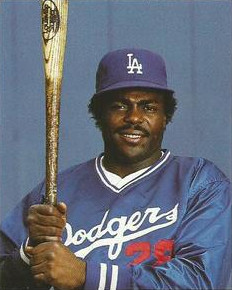
- Guerrero in 1984
- First baseman / Outfielder / Third baseman
- Born: June 29, 1956 (age 70); San Pedro de Macorís, Dominican Republic
- Batted: Right Threw: Right

MLB debut
- September 22, 1978, for the Los Angeles Dodgers

Last MLB appearance
- October 4, 1992, for the St. Louis Cardinals

MLB statistics
- Batting average: .300
- Home runs: 215
- Runs batted in: 898
- Stats at Baseball Reference

Teams
- Los Angeles Dodgers (1978–1988); St. Louis Cardinals (1988–1992)

Career highlights and awards
- 5× All-Star (1981, 1983, 1985, 1987, 1989); World Series champion (1981); World Series MVP (1981); Silver Slugger Award (1982)

Pedro Guerrero (born June 29, 1956) is a Dominican former professional baseball player. He played fifteen seasons in Major League Baseball from 1978 to 1992 with the Los Angeles Dodgers and St. Louis Cardinals.

== Early life ==
Guerrero was born on June 29, 1956, in San Pedro de Macorís, on the east coast of the Dominican Republic. During his early teenage years, he left school to support his family by working in the island's rum industry, earning less than US$3 a week from cutting cane. Guerrero supported his divorced mother and siblings during the day. In his free time, he played the drums and participated in organized baseball on weekends. By the age of 16, Guerrero had distinguished himself in a local youth league, primarily playing at third base.

Latin scouting pioneer Reggie Otero, representing the Cleveland Indians, traveled to San Pedro to scout Guerrero. Otero described his first impression of Guerrero as follows: "He was five-feet-11, 157 pounds. I looked at the width of his shoulders, back and front, and knew that he would get heavier and stronger. He had lived off of rice and beans." In late 1972, Otero offered Guerrero a pro contract, which included a $2,500 bonus to be paid out on New Year's Day of 1973.

== Career ==
At the age of 17, Guerrero began his career with a season of rookie ball in the Gulf Coast League. In April 1974, the Indians, seeking pitching help, traded Guerrero to the Los Angeles Dodgers for minor league, left-handed pitcher Bruce Ellingsen. Dodgers personnel director Al Campanis had recently hired Otero, who then recommended the acquisition of Guerrero. Ellingsen pitched only 16 major league games; contrasted with Guerrero's All-Star career, the trade ranks as one of the most lopsided straight-up swaps in baseball history.

Guerrero played several years in the minor leagues before being called up to the Dodgers. Los Angeles won three pennants between 1974 and 1978, receiving a steady supply of pitching talent from Triple-A Albuquerque and gaining even more assets through trades and free agency. Meanwhile, Guerrero shined in the minors. He hit .300 or better in six seasons and was named to minor league All-Star teams at both first and third base. In 1977, he was leading the Pacific Coast League at Triple-A Albuquerque with a .403 batting average when he fractured his left ankle in the field. The injury cost him a call-up to the majors.

=== Los Angeles Dodgers ===
Guerrero finally broke into the big leagues in late 1978. His first major league at-bat came in the fifth inning of a September blowout loss against Randy Jones and the San Diego Padres. Guerrero pinch-hit for former minor-league roommate and future nemesis Rick Sutcliffe and hit a single. Exactly one year later, he hit his first major league home run off Padres pitcher Bob Owchinko, appearing in 25 games total in 1979. Guerrero made significant contributions to the Dodgers in 1980. He filled a valuable utility role over two stretches during the season, spelling an ailing Davey Lopes at second and a slumping Rudy Law in center field. Overall, Guerrero played six different positions in 1980 and batted an impressive .322 with 7 homers and 31 RBI in 183 at-bats.

At the start of the 1981 season, incumbent right fielder Reggie Smith was rehabilitating from an arm injury, which opened a spot in right field for Guerrero. The first half of the season was going well, with a batting average of .325 and the Dodgers atop their division, when a players' strike halted the season in early June. After the season resumed in August, Guerrero won the first of five All-Star nods. Guerrero batted only .269 in the second half of the split campaign as the Dodgers posted a mediocre 27–26 record the rest of the way, but the Dodgers were guaranteed a playoff spot due to their first-half lead. Guerrero's slump continued into the postseason. The Dodgers were pushed to the brink in two consecutive playoff rounds against Houston and Montreal, but managed to overcome deficits in each series. The Dodgers again faced the New York Yankees in the 1981 World Series, their third Fall Classic matchup in five years. Guerrero factored into three straight wins in Games 3–5, but his crowning performance in Game 6 sealed the series for the Dodgers. In that final game, Pedro totaled five RBIs and eight total bases amassed on a triple, homer, and bases-loaded single. The one-man show capped a 9–2 victory and gave the Dodgers their first World Series title in 16 years. Guerrero was named co-MVP of the Series along with teammates Ron Cey and Steve Yeager.

In 1982, Guerrero won a Silver Slugger Award for his offensive performance as an outfielder. He also became the first Dodger to hit 30 home runs and steal 20 bases in a season, and he did it again the following year. In 1985, Guerrero tied a major league record with 15 home runs in June and also tied the Los Angeles season record of 33. He reached base 14 consecutive times that year, two short of the record set by Ted Williams, and led the league in slugging, on-base, and home run percentage.

Guerrero was an aggressive base runner but a poor slider. He ruptured a tendon sliding in spring training and missed most of the 1986 season, after which he ran less frequently. However, in 1987, he batted .338 and won the UPI's Comeback Player of the Year award. His batting average that year was the highest by any Dodger since the .346 recorded by Tommy Davis in 1962.

The Dodgers shifted him from the outfield to a starter at third base as a replacement for the departing Ron Cey. He also played sporadically at first base as the need arose. Although he gained a reputation for being shaky at third, he was statistically one of the best in the league at getting to the ball.

=== St. Louis Cardinals ===
During Los Angeles' 1988 championship season, he was traded to the Cardinals for pitcher John Tudor.

In 1989, Guerrero earned MVP consideration, batting .311 with 17 home runs, a career-high 117 RBIs, and tying Tim Wallach with a league-high 42 doubles. His production fell off sharply afterwards. In 1992, a shoulder injury limited him to 43 games, the last of his major league career; he finished the season batting just .219 with one home run.

=== Independent, Mexican, and minor leagues ===
In 1993, after becoming a free agent and not finding a new major league team, Guerrero signed with the independent Sioux Falls Canaries of the Northern League. He split the season between the Canaries and the Charros de Jalisco of the Mexican League. He returned to the Canaries in 1994.

Guerrero signed a minor league contract with the California Angels in December 1994. In January, the team asked him to be a replacement player during the ongoing strike, but Guerrero refused. He said he would consider breaking the strike if the Angels would pay him more. He played for the Double-A Midland Angels in 1995 before retiring.

=== Career statistics ===
In 1,536 games spanning 15 seasons, Guerrero recorded a .300 batting average (1,618-for-5,392) with 730 runs, 267 doubles, 29 triples, 215 home runs, 898 RBI, 97 stolen bases, 609 bases on balls, .370 on-base percentage and .480 slugging percentage. He posted a .977 fielding percentage playing at all three outfield positions and first, second and third base. In 26 postseason games, Guerrero hit .225 (20-for-89) with 7 runs, 4 home runs, 16 RBI and 13 walks.

== Coaching career ==
Guerrero was out of baseball until 2011 when his former teammate Mike Marshall, then commissioner of the Arizona Winter League, hired him as a hitting instructor. In 2012, Guerrero was named the manager of the Tijuana Truenos of the Liga Norte de Mexico. In 2013, Guerrero was named the manager of the Vallejo Admirals in the Pacific Association of Professional Baseball Clubs. Guerrero was relieved of his managerial duties in July when a new ownership group took over the team. In 2014, he was named manager of the Rieleros de Frontera in the Liga del Norte in the city of Monclova in the Mexican minor leagues. Guerrero led the Rieleros to the Liga del Norte championship where they defeated the Palau Tuzos 4 games to 2 to win the league title.

== Personal life ==
In September 1999, Guerrero was arrested for his alleged involvement in the purchase of $200,000 of cocaine from an undercover agent. In June 2000, he was acquitted of drug conspiracy charges after his attorney argued his client did not understand the full implications of the alleged drug deal.

In April 2017, Guerrero suffered a serious stroke while in New York. Doctors feared he was brain dead, but after more testing, it was discovered he was in a coma. The next morning he made what was considered a miraculous recovery and was moved out of ICU, speaking to friends and family.

== See also ==
- List of Major League Baseball annual doubles leaders
- List of Major League Baseball annual putouts leaders
- List of Major League Baseball players from the Dominican Republic
- List of St. Louis Cardinals team records
- Los Angeles Dodgers award winners and league leaders

Awards and achievements
Preceded by Dave Parker; Mark Grace	National League Player of the Month; June 1985; August 1989	Succeeded by Keith Hernandez; Will Clark
