= Jerry Doggett =

American sportscaster (1916–1997)

- Born: Jerome Howard Doggett; September 14, 1916; Moberly, Missouri, U.S.
- Died: July 7, 1997 (aged 80); Morgan Hill, California, U.S.
- Education: Northwestern University
- Occupation: Sports commentator
- Years active: 1941–1987
- Spouse: Jodie Attaway (m. 1940)
- Children: 1
- Sports commentary career
- Genre: Play-by-play
- Sports: Baseball, football, basketball, golf

Jerome Howard Doggett (September 14, 1916 – July 7, 1997) was an American sportscaster who called games for the Brooklyn and Los Angeles Dodgers of Major League Baseball from 1956 to 1987.

== Early days ==
Doggett was born in Moberly, Missouri, and began his announcing career at KFRO in Longview, Texas. In 1941, he moved to WRR before it became an FM station in Dallas to begin a 15-year career as the play-by-play baseball announcer for the Dallas Rebels of the Texas League. He also called major-league games for the Liberty Broadcasting System as well as Southern Methodist University basketball and Southwest Conference college football through the 1940s and early '50s. In the 1960s he called games for the Los Angeles Blades of the Western Hockey League. Nationally, he announced the 1959 Ryder Cup and 1960–61 NBA basketball games on NBC television, and the first 1961 MLB All-Star Game on NBC Radio.

== With the Dodgers ==
In 1956, Walter O'Malley wrote a letter to another radio owner about Doggett's qualifications before hiring him for the Dodgers. During his 32-year career with the Dodgers, Doggett played second banana to Vin Scully, who had been broadcasting Dodgers games since 1950. The two men were also joined by Ross Porter from 1977 to 1987.

== Death ==
Doggett died of natural causes at his home in Morgan Hill, California, at the age of 80.

== Legacy ==
Doggett was named number 88 broadcaster in The Voices of Summer by Curt Smith, and was on the ballot for the 2007 Ford C. Frick Award for broadcasting excellence.

Doggett appears in the Batman episodes "A Death Worse Than Fate" (as The Announcer), and "The Clock King's Crazy Crimes" (as Fred Forbes). He also can be heard calling a Dodgers game in the Quincy, M.E. episode "Go Fight City Hall…to the Death".

The character of John Doggett on the television series The X-Files was named in homage of Jerry Doggett. The show's creator, Chris Carter, is a Dodgers fan and had previously named the show's Dana Scully character for Vin Scully.
