= Tony Brewer =

American baseball player (born 1957)

- Outfielder
- Born: November 25, 1957 (age 68); Coushatta, Louisiana, U.S.
- Batted: Right Threw: Right

MLB debut
- August 1, 1984, for the Los Angeles Dodgers

Last MLB appearance
- September 30, 1984, for the Los Angeles Dodgers

MLB statistics
- Batting average: .108
- Home runs: 1
- Runs batted in: 4

NPB statistics
- Batting average: .307
- Home runs: 99
- Runs batted in: 302
- Stats at Baseball Reference

Teams
- Los Angeles Dodgers (1984); Nippon-Ham Fighters (1986–1987, 1989–1990)

Anthony Bruce Brewer (born November 25, 1957) is an American former professional baseball outfielder. He played in Major League Baseball (MLB) for the Los Angeles Dodgers and in Nippon Professional Baseball (NPB) for the Nippon-Ham Fighters.

== Biography ==
Brewer attended Palo Alto Senior High School and played football, baseball and wrestling. He qualified for the California Interscholastic Federation (CIF) state tournament for wrestling. Brewer then played college baseball for the Miami Hurricanes.

Brewer was not selected by a Major League Baseball (MLB) team in the MLB draft, and was signed as a free agent by the Los Angeles Dodgers in October 1979. He played in Minor League Baseball for several Dodger farm teams, reaching the Triple-A level in 1982. Brewer went on to appear in 24 major-league games for the Dodgers during the 1984 season. He had a .108 batting average (4-for-37). He hit one major-league home run, in his final major-league at bat. His brother Mike Brewer also played in MLB.

Brewer went on to a productive career in Japan with the Nippon-Ham Fighters, where he batted .307 with 99 home runs in four seasons.

== See also ==
- List of Major League Baseball players with a home run in their final major league at bat
