= Larry White (baseball) =

American baseball player (born 1958)

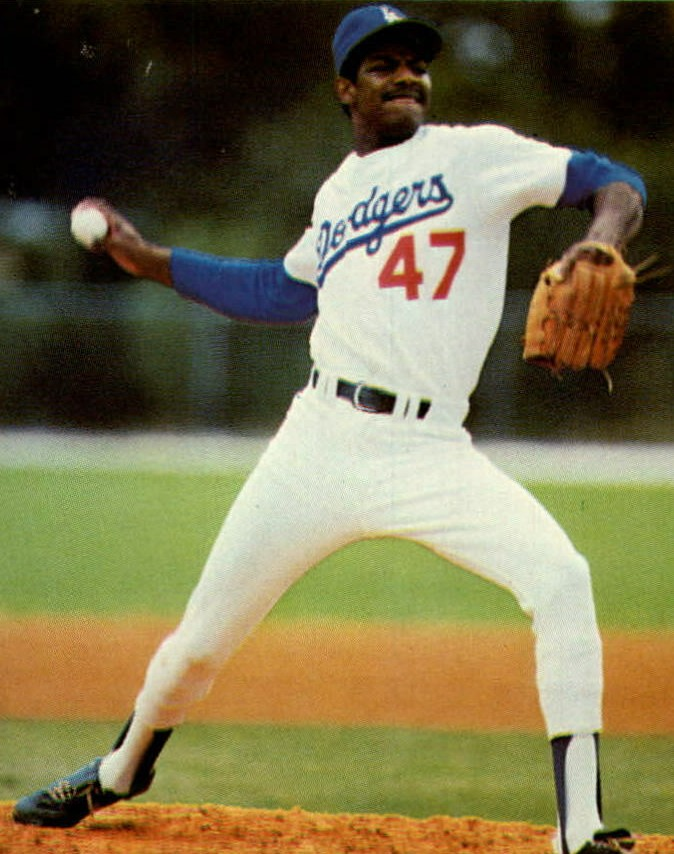
- Pitcher
- Born: September 25, 1958 (age 67); San Fernando, California, U.S.
- Batted: Right Threw: Right

MLB debut
- September 20, 1983, for the Los Angeles Dodgers

Last MLB appearance
- September 25, 1984, for the Los Angeles Dodgers

MLB statistics
- Record: 0-1
- Earned run average: 2.37
- Strikeouts: 15
- Stats at Baseball Reference

Teams
- Los Angeles Dodgers (1983–1984)

Larry David White (born September 25, 1958) is an American former professional baseball pitcher. He pitched in 11 games for the Los Angeles Dodgers of Major League Baseball (MLB) in the 1983 and 1984 seasons.
