= Rich Rodas =

American baseball player (born 1959)

- Pitcher
- Born: November 7, 1959 (age 66); Roseville, California
- Batted: Left Threw: Left

MLB debut
- September 6, 1983, for the Los Angeles Dodgers

Last MLB appearance
- June 19, 1984, for the Los Angeles Dodgers

MLB statistics
- Record: 0-0
- Earned run average: 3.72
- Strikeouts: 6
- Stats at Baseball Reference

Teams
- Los Angeles Dodgers (1983–1984)

Richard Martin Rodas (born November 7, 1959) is a former pitcher in Major League Baseball. He pitched in 10 games for the Los Angeles Dodgers in the 1983 and 1984 seasons.

== Minor Leagues ==
Signed by the Dodgers as a non-drafted free agent on June 15, 1979, Rodas joined the Lethbridge Dodgers, the Rookie League affiliate in the Pioneer League. In 13 starts, Rodas achieved the pitcher's Triple Crown by leading the league in wins, going 12-0, ERA (1.12), and strikeouts (148). Rodas' ERA was especially impressive given the league's average ERA of 4.75.

After missing the 1980 season due to surgery to repair a circulation issue, Rodas went on to lead his teams in wins for the next three seasons (14 with the San Antonio Missions, and 14 and 16 with the Albuquerque Dukes). It was after going 16-4 in 1983 that Rodas earned his first promotion to the Dodgers.

At 25, Rodas retired from baseball with an impressive Minor League win/loss record of 61-20 (.753).
