= Ed Amelung =

American baseball player (born 1959)

- Outfielder
- Born: April 13, 1959 (age 67); Fullerton, California, U.S.
- Batted: Left Threw: Left

MLB debut
- July 28, 1984, for the Los Angeles Dodgers

Last MLB appearance
- July 7, 1986, for the Los Angeles Dodgers

MLB statistics
- Batting average: .193
- Home runs: 0
- Runs batted in: 4
- Stats at Baseball Reference

Teams
- Los Angeles Dodgers (1984, 1986)

Edward Allen Amelung (born April 13, 1959) is an American former professional baseball outfielder. He is an alumnus of San Diego State University.

Amelung began his college baseball career at Santa Ana College where he set school records in batting average, hits, runs, runs batted in and home runs. He was named the school's Athlete of the Year in 1979.

Signed by the Los Angeles Dodgers of the Major League Baseball (MLB) as an amateur free agent in 1980, Amelung made his MLB debut on July 28, 1984, and appeared in his final game on July 7, 1986.
