= Steve Sax =

American baseball player (born 1960)

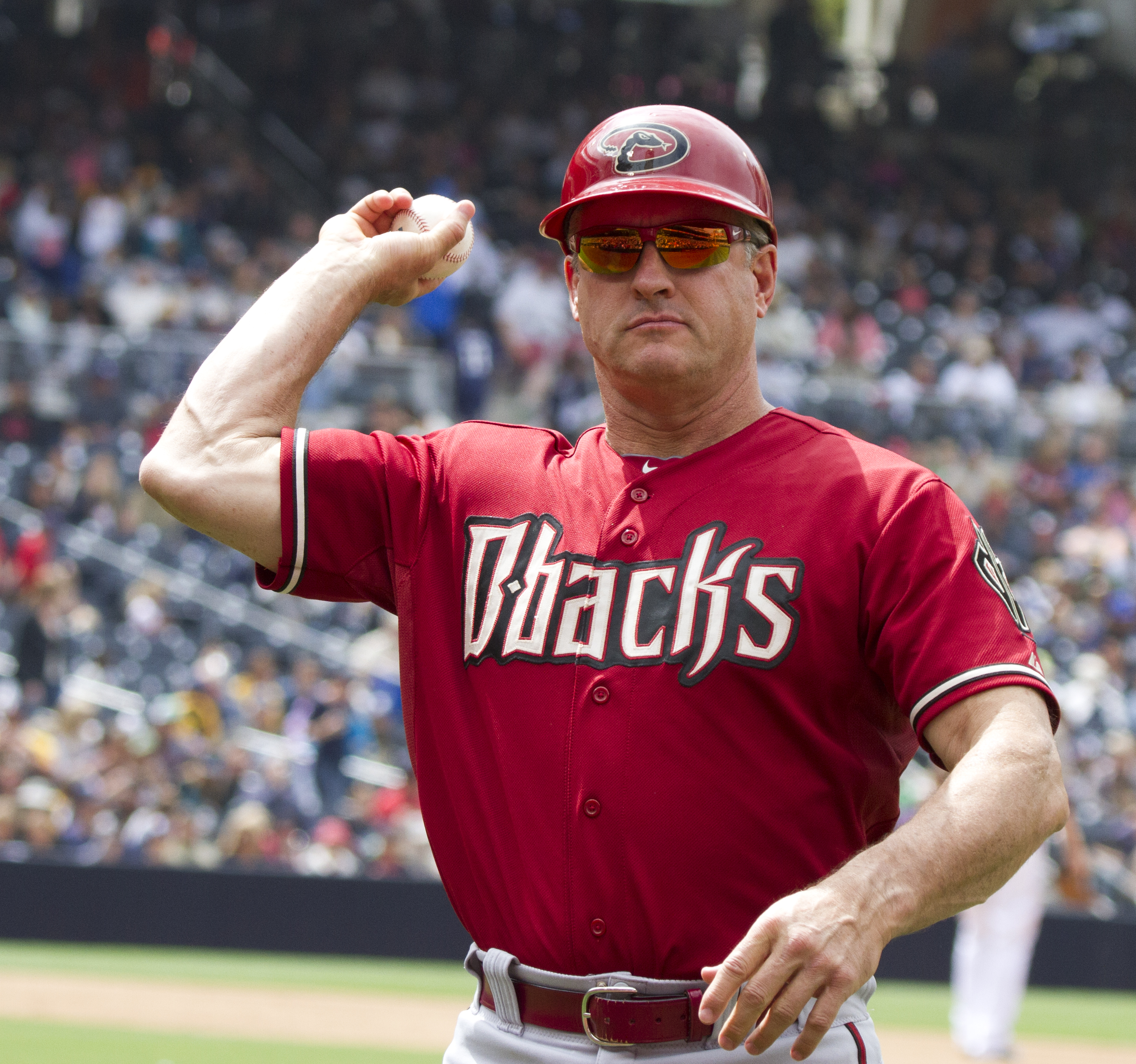
- Sax with the Arizona Diamondbacks in 2013
- Second baseman
- Born: January 29, 1960 (age 66); West Sacramento, California, U.S.
- Batted: Right Threw: Right

MLB debut
- August 18, 1981, for the Los Angeles Dodgers

Last MLB appearance
- May 8, 1994, for the Oakland Athletics

MLB statistics
- Batting average: .281
- Home runs: 54
- Runs batted in: 550
- Stolen bases: 444
- Stats at Baseball Reference

Teams
- As player: Los Angeles Dodgers (1981–1988); New York Yankees (1989–1991); Chicago White Sox (1992–1993); Oakland Athletics (1994); As coach: Arizona Diamondbacks (2013)

Career highlights and awards
- 5× All-Star (1982, 1983, 1986, 1989, 1990); 2× World Series champion (1981, 1988); NL Rookie of the Year (1982); Silver Slugger Award (1986)

Stephen Louis Sax (born January 29, 1960) is an American former Major League Baseball player and coach. He played as a second baseman in Major League Baseball from 1981 to 1994, celebrated as a member of the Los Angeles Dodgers with whom he won world championships in 1981 and 1988. A five-time All-Star, Sax was named the National League Rookie of the Year in 1982 and won the Silver Slugger Award in 1986. He also played for the New York Yankees, Chicago White Sox, and the Oakland Athletics. Sax hosts for SiriusXM's MLB Network Radio.

== Career ==
Sax starred at James Marshall High School (now known as River City High School) in West Sacramento, California, from 1975 to 1978. The Los Angeles Dodgers selected Sax in the ninth round of the 1978 MLB draft. Sax was a late season call up in 1981, playing 31 games. Sax broke into the majors as a regular in 1982, earning the National League Rookie of the Year award. Throughout his career, Sax was on the All-Star team five times and had a batting average over .300 in three seasons. He had great success on the basepaths, stealing over 40 bases in six different seasons, finishing with a career total of 444 stolen bases. His best year arguably came in 1986, when he finished second in the NL with a .332 batting average, 210 base hits, and 43 doubles, and won a Silver Slugger Award. Sax earned World Series rings with the Los Angeles Dodgers in 1981 and 1988.

Following the end of the 1988 season, Sax signed with the New York Yankees as a free agent after feeling disrespected by the Dodgers during contract negotiations. In 1989, he made the All-Star team due to a strong start with the Yankees. He finished the season with a .315 batting average, 205 base hits, 88 runs, and 43 stolen bases. Sax made the All-Star team his last time in 1990, finishing the season with 43 stolen bases, though his batting average dropped to .260. In 1991, he had another strong year with the Yankees, finishing the season with a .304 batting average, 198 base hits, and 38 doubles.

Sax was also a higher-up in the Players Association during his career.

=== Steve Sax syndrome ===
Though never regarded as one of the top fielding second basemen in the league, Steve Sax inexplicably became incapable of making routine throws to first base in 1983, committing 30 errors that season. This is referred to in baseball terminology as "Steve Sax syndrome", the fielder's variant of "Steve Blass disease", named after the Pirates pitcher who suffered a similar breakdown of basic mechanics (also known as "the yips"). As his accuracy suffered, fans sitting behind the first base dugout began wearing batting helmets as mock protection. Teammate Pedro Guerrero, an outfielder pressed into service at third base in 1983, once reportedly stated that his first thought whenever he was in the field was "I hope they don't hit it to me", while his second thought was "I hope they don't hit it to Sax." By 1989, however, Sax seemed to be completely "cured", leading the American League in both fielding percentage and double plays.

== Post-career ==
Sax piloted a new networking site called allsportsconnection.com. Sax has made television cameos, including the "Homer at the Bat" episode of The Simpsons, as well as episodes of Square Pegs, Who's the Boss, Hollywood Squares, Body Language and Sabrina The Teenage Witch. He has also been on the Fox News show Hannity. Sax played a supporting character in the 1998 movie Ground Control.

He briefly ran for a seat in the California State Assembly 5th District as a Republican in 1996. Sax, however, later dropped out of the race, when his divorce became publicized. A black belt, he was also a part-owner of a martial arts studio in Roseville, California.

He worked as a financial consultant for RBC Dain Rauscher, LLC, in their Roseville, California, office. He had approximately 25 to 30 clients, including several athletes. He was a partner in the Sax/Hinman Sports Professional Group at RBC Dain Rauscher providing professional wealth management for sports professionals at every level of all professional sports.

In December 2012, Sax was named the first base coach for the Arizona Diamondbacks. The Diamondbacks fired him on October 8, 2013.

As of 2015, Sax returned to the Los Angeles Dodgers organization as an alumnus member of the Dodgers' Community Relations team.

Sax currently hosts SiriusXM's MLB Network Radio. Sax also announces Saturday night Sacramento River Cats broadcasts on KMAX-TV in his hometown of West Sacramento. Starting in 2025, Sax became a studio analyst for the Athletics.

== Personal life ==
Steve is the brother of former Major League Baseball player Dave Sax, who also played for the Dodgers. He is the father of Lauren Ashley (Sax) Boyd and son John Jeremy Sax. His nephew David Sax Jr. (son of Dave Sax) was seen on an episode of Intervention in 2015. His son John, a captain in the United States Marine Corps, was one of five Marines killed in a V-22 Osprey training accident near San Diego, California on June 8, 2022.

A nephew, Nick Sogard, plays in Major League Baseball for the Boston Red Sox.

== See also ==
- List of Major League Baseball career stolen bases leaders

Preceded by Dale Murphy	National League Player of the Month; September 1986	Succeeded by Eric Davis
