= Dave Anderson (infielder) =

American baseball player (born 1960)

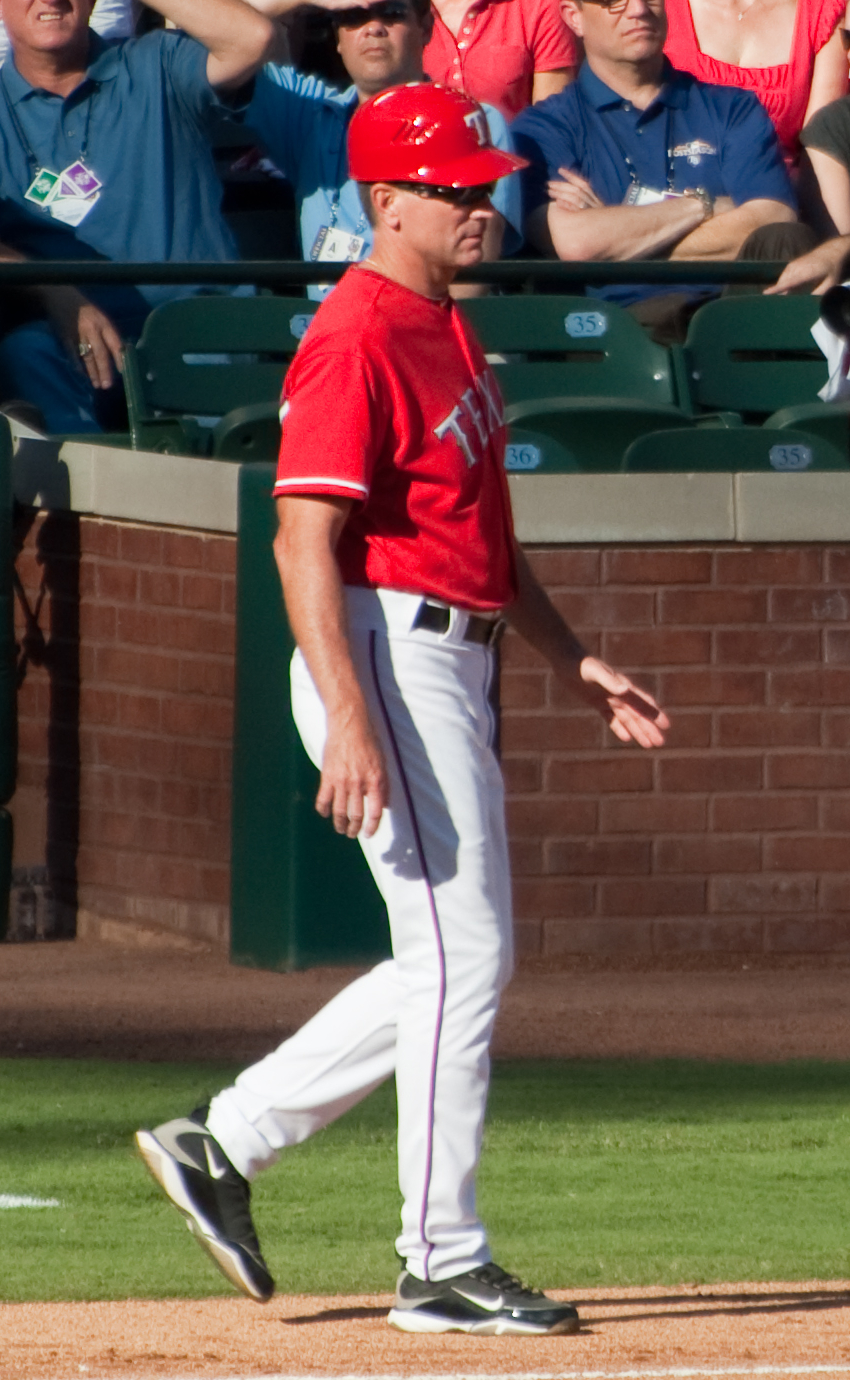
- Anderson as third base coach for the Texas Rangers in 2010
- Infielder
- Born: August 1, 1960 (age 66); Louisville, Kentucky, U.S.
- Batted: Right Threw: Right

MLB debut
- May 8, 1983, for the Los Angeles Dodgers

Last MLB appearance
- October 3, 1992, for the Los Angeles Dodgers

MLB statistics
- Batting average: .242
- Home runs: 19
- Runs batted in: 143
- Stats at Baseball Reference

Teams
- As player: Los Angeles Dodgers (1983–1989); San Francisco Giants (1990–1991); Los Angeles Dodgers (1992); As coach: Texas Rangers (2009–2013)

Career highlights and awards
- World Series champion (1988)

David Carter Anderson (born August 1, 1960) is an American former professional baseball shortstop and third baseman, who played Major League Baseball (MLB) for the Los Angeles Dodgers (1983–89, 1992) and San Francisco Giants (1990–91).

== Playing career ==
Anderson was drafted in the first round (22nd overall) of the 1981 draft by the Los Angeles Dodgers out of the University of Memphis. Anderson made his Major League debut on May 8, 1983, and played parts of eight seasons with the Dodgers, as well as two with the San Francisco Giants, before his final game on October 3, 1992. He was a member of the Dodgers team that won the 1988 World Series. In Game One of the series, he was on-deck as a decoy to pinch-hit for the pitcher before manager Tommy Lasorda brought in the injured Kirk Gibson, who went on to win the game with one of the most dramatic home runs in World Series history.

== Managing and coaching career ==
Anderson was the manager for the 1994 Jamestown Jammers of the single A short season New York–Penn League. He led the team to a 42–32 record finishing in first place in the Stedler Division and losing in the playoff semi-final round to the New Jersey Cardinals. He managed throughout the Tigers chain until partially into the 2000 season, when he re-signed to become the head coach at his alma mater, the University of Memphis, where he remained for four seasons. In 2007, he led the Texas Rangers' AA affiliate, the Frisco RoughRiders of the Texas League, to an 85–55 record, ultimately bowing out in the first round of the playoffs.

On the big league level, Anderson was most recently the first base coach for the Texas Rangers, where he was relieved of his duties in October 2013. On September 5, 2010, Anderson was involved in a controversial play at Target Field. As the Rangers attempted a 2-out rally against the Minnesota Twins, Vladimir Guerrero hit a soft grounder up the middle. Anderson appeared to make incidental contact with Michael Young, who was attempting to retreat to the third base bag to beat a throw from Orlando Hudson. Third base umpire Alfonso Márquez called Young out for coach's interference, ending the game in a 6–5 Rangers loss. Anderson and Young both claimed that they never touched each other, and argued to no avail. In April 2011, as the Rangers third-base coach, Anderson encouraged Josh Hamilton to tag up and score on a foul pop up in the first inning of a game against the Detroit Tigers, after noticing nobody was covering the plate. Tigers catcher Victor Martinez was able to return in time to apply a tag to a sliding Hamilton, resulting in a small fracture of Hamilton's humerus. After the game, Hamilton referred to the play as 'stupid' and 'dumb' before apologizing to Anderson days later.

Anderson returning to managing in 2015, serving as the manager of the Salt Lake Bees, the Triple-A affiliate of the Los Angeles Angels of Anaheim. He spent the 2019 season as the Baltimore Orioles minor league infield coordinator. He was named the manager of the Delmarva Shorebirds prior to the 2020 season. In 2025, he was named the manager of the Johnson City Doughboys.
