= Ross Porter (sportscaster) =

American sportscaster (born 1938)

- Born: November 29, 1938 (age 87); Shawnee, Oklahoma, U.S.
- Sports commentary career
- Team: Los Angeles Dodgers (1977–2004)
- Genre: Play-by-play
- Sport: Major League Baseball

Ross U. Porter Jr. (born November 29, 1938) is an American sportscaster, known for his 28-year tenure (1977–2004) as a play-by-play announcer for Los Angeles Dodgers baseball.

== Early life ==
Porter was born in Shawnee, Oklahoma, and graduated from Shawnee High School in 1955, then went on to earn a radio journalism degree at the University of Oklahoma. His broadcasting career began in 1953 at age 14, when he broadcast a few innings of several baseball games involving the Class D Shawnee Hawks, a Brooklyn Dodgers farm club, over KGFF. At age 15, Porter was elevated to play-by-play man of the Shawnee Wolves' football and basketball broadcasts and the Hawks when their regular announcer resigned. At a high school football game one night, Ross was introduced by his father to the legendary Jim Thorpe.

== Broadcasting career ==
After earning his college degree, Porter was hired by WKY radio in Oklahoma City as a newscaster. He also was a sports anchor for WKY-TV, and at age 24 became the youngest recipient of the Oklahoma Sportscaster of the Year award, and the youngest state winner ever in the nation. Ross repeated the next year. Between 1960 and 1966, he did the play-by-play of the previous day's University of Oklahoma football game on channel 4's one-hour "Sunday Playback Show."

In 1966, at age 27, he left for Los Angeles and subsequently spent 10 years as a sportscaster for KNBC-TV in Los Angeles. He worked alongside Tom Snyder on the 6 PM news and Tom Brokaw on the 11 PM news. Porter won two local Emmys.

Porter worked for NBC Sports in the early 1970s, calling NFL football from 1970 to 1976 and Pacific-8 college basketball from 1972 to 1976. He also served as the halftime host of the 1974 Final Four, the sideline reporter for the 1975 Rose Bowl, and a hole announcer for the Bing Crosby National Pro-Am golf tournament. Porter had to give up his NBC assignments when he joined the Dodgers in 1977, due to an overlap in seasons. He later was the radio and television voice of UNLV Rebels football and basketball from 1978 to 1992.

During the 1970s, Porter had been the television play-by-play announcer for the high school basketball Game of The Week on KNBC showing matchups between Los Angeles area teams. Former Dodgers pitcher Sandy Koufax worked as a game analyst with Ross the first year. One of their games went five overtimes.

Ross was rated among the top 60 baseball announcers of all time by Curt Smith in his book Voices of Summer.

Ross Porter is the only broadcaster to have been the voice of a World Series champion (the 1981 and 1988 Dodgers) and a college basketball champion (with UNLV in 1990). In 1968, Porter was honored as a Distinguished Alum of the University of Oklahoma.

Ross was inducted into the Southern California Sports Broadcasters Hall of Fame in 2005 with Vin Scully, his longtime Dodgers broadcasting colleague, as his presenter. Scully said, "I had the pleasure and the opportunity to work alongside Ross for 28 years. He fulfills all of the requirements of a successful professional announcer. His work habits and preparation are exemplary. Ross is accurate, informative and entertaining while modestly keeping himself secondary to the game. I have great admiration and respect for him not only as a professional but as a man." In 2007, Porter received the Bill Teegins Excellence in Sportscasting Award from the Oklahoma Sports Museum.

On August 23, 1989, Porter set a major league baseball record for broadcasting 22 straight innings on radio by himself in a six-hour, 14 minute game against the Expos in Montreal. Vin Scully did not make the trip to Canada because no games were televised. Don Drysdale worked the first two games of the series, then left for Los Angeles when his wife, Ann, went into labor with their second child.

== Los Angeles Dodgers ==
Porter was known for providing fans with statistical information on players during his broadcasts. He was the host of a pregame and postgame radio show known as DodgerTalk for 14 years, answering phone calls from listeners with questions pertaining to baseball. He was voted Los Angeles Sportstalk Host of the Year the first three years the award was presented by the Southern California Sports Broadcasters Association, and later won it a fourth time. Porter helped broadcast the 1977 World Series and 1978 World Series, both involving the Dodgers, on over 600 CBS Radio stations around the world. Ross also did Game of the Week broadcasts for CBS Radio in the 1980s and '90s. His most famous national call is from the sixth and final game of the 1977 Series, during which Reggie Jackson smacked three home runs on three consecutive pitches. The capper:

Jackson with four runs batted in - sends a fly ball to center field and deep! That's going to be way back and THAT'S going to be gone! Reggie Jackson has hit his third home run of the game!

== Post-Dodgers ==
Porter began a new venture called Real Sports Heroes with Ross Porter in April 2007. Real Sports Heroes highlighted the positive side of athletics and the great things that some athletes are doing and have done to give something back to the community. Porter aired 90-second Real Sports Heroes vignettes on KLAC and KABC radio in Los Angeles. The vignettes and Porter's web site were sponsored by American Airlines.

Porter aired high school football games for the IBN Sports Network in 2011, and joined Fox Sports West in 2012 to announce prep football, basketball, and baseball contests.

In 2016, Porter became the announcer for the Cal State Northridge Matadors baseball team. For the next five years, he wrote a weekly column during baseball season for "Dodgers Dugout," a newsletter published by the Los Angeles Times. Titled "Ask Ross," fans from around the world posed baseball questions which he answered.

Since 2006, Porter has hosted a charity golf tournament each November to raise funds for his clinical psychologist son's non-profit organization, Stillpoint Family Resources. Stillpoint was founded when Ross and Lin's first grandson was born with Down Syndrome. John Michael underwent three heart surgeries in the first 18 months of his life, and today at 32 is the joy of the family. 105 celebrities have participated in the Ross Porter Celebrity Golf Classic, played in Southern California. Ross currently has two sports sites on the internet. On Ross Porter Sports Facebook, he interacts with fans, writes commentaries, answers questions, and urges viewers to not only post their opinions, but also submit photos and visuals. Ross Porter Sports YouTube lets you see and hear 217 interviews and features that Ross has done with sports personalities, celebrities, and close friends.

On February 27, 2024, Ross was presented a Lifetime Achievement Award by the Southern California Sports Broadcasters Association for his 38 uninterrupted years on the air on Los Angeles radio and television stations.

Porter published his first book in the fall of 2025, The Ross Porter Chronicles, Volume 1: The Dodger Years. The 225-page book features interviews with 24 former Dodger players and personnel in print and QR codes providing visual additions.

== Personal life ==
Porter married his wife Lin 65 years ago, in 1961. They have two sets of boy/girl twins, ages 62 and 57, and 11 grandchildren—9 boys and 2 girls.

He currently lives in West Hills, California.
