= List of Los Angeles Dodgers coaches =

The following is a list of coaches, including position, year(s) of service(s), who appeared at least in one game for the Los Angeles Dodgers National League franchise also known previously as the Brooklyn Dodgers.

== Bench coach ==
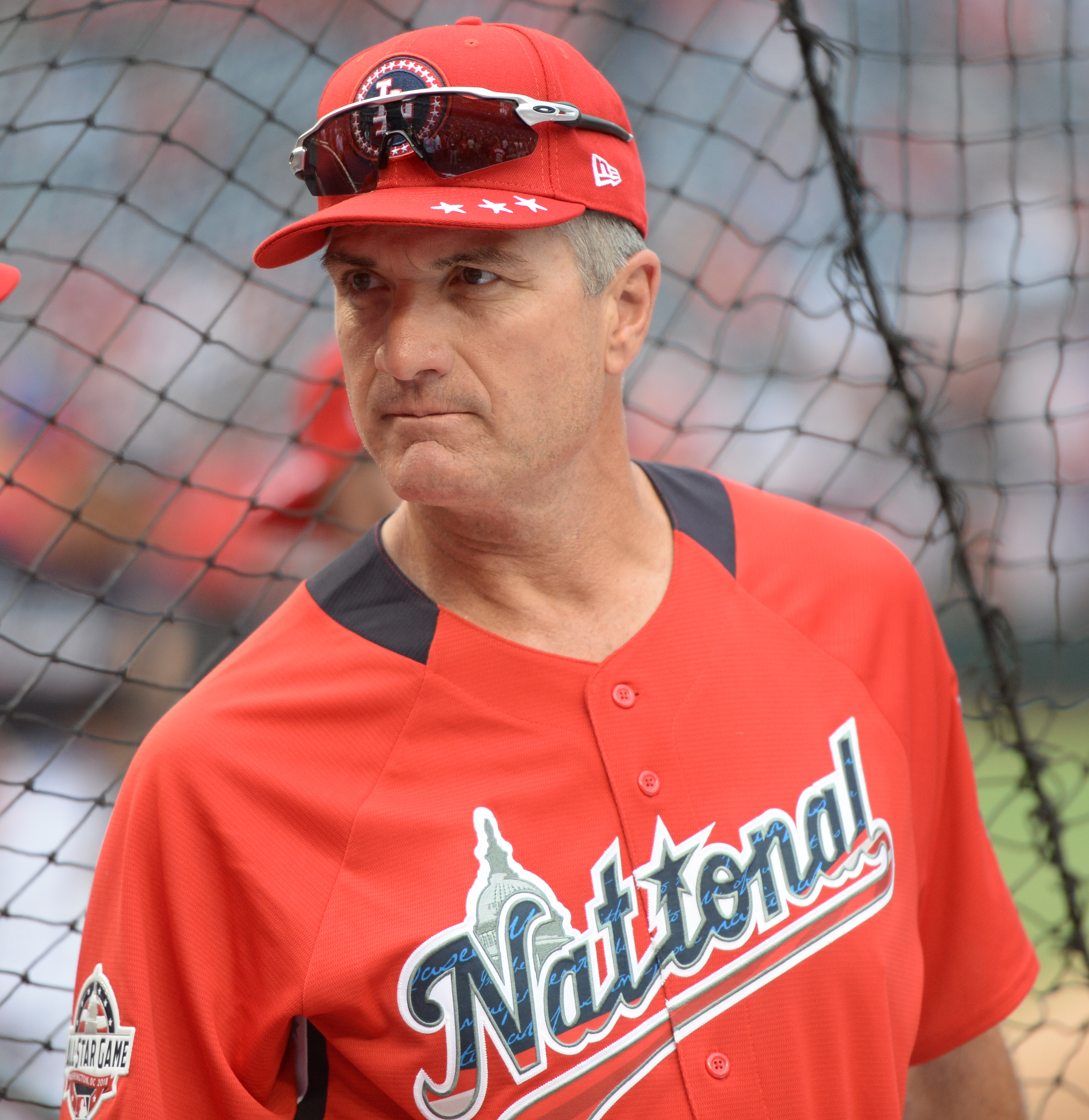
Former Dodgers bench coach Bob Geren

- Monty Basgall (1980)
- Joe Ferguson (1988–1989)
- Bill Russell (1990)
- Joe Ferguson (1991)
- Ben Hines (1992)
- Joe Ferguson (1993–1994)
- Bill Russell (1996)
- Manny Mota (1996)
- Mike Scioscia (1997–1998)
- Jim Tracy (1999–2000)
- Jim Riggleman (2001–2005)
- Jim Lett (2005)
- Dave Jauss (2006–2007)
- Bob Schaefer (2008–2010)
- Trey Hillman (2011–2013)
- Tim Wallach (2014–2015)
- Bob Geren (2016–2022)
- Danny Lehmann (2023–present)

== Hitting coach ==
- Dixie Walker (1970–1974)
- Jim Gilliam (1977–1978)
- Jim Lefebvre (1978–1979)
- Manny Mota (1980–1989)
- Ben Hines (1987–1993)
- Reggie Smith (1994–1999)
- Rick Down (1999–2000)
- Jack Clark (2001–2003)
- George Hendrick (2003)
- Tim Wallach (2004–2005)
- Eddie Murray (2006–2007)
- Bill Mueller (2007)
- Mike Easler (2008)
- Don Mattingly (2008–2010)
- Jeff Pentland (2011)
- Dave Hansen (2011–2012)
- Mark McGwire (2013–2015)
- Turner Ward (2016–2018)
- Robert Van Scoyoc (2019–present)
- Brant Brown (2021–2022)
- Aaron Bates (2023–2026)
- Pedro Guerrero (2027–present)

== Pitching coach ==
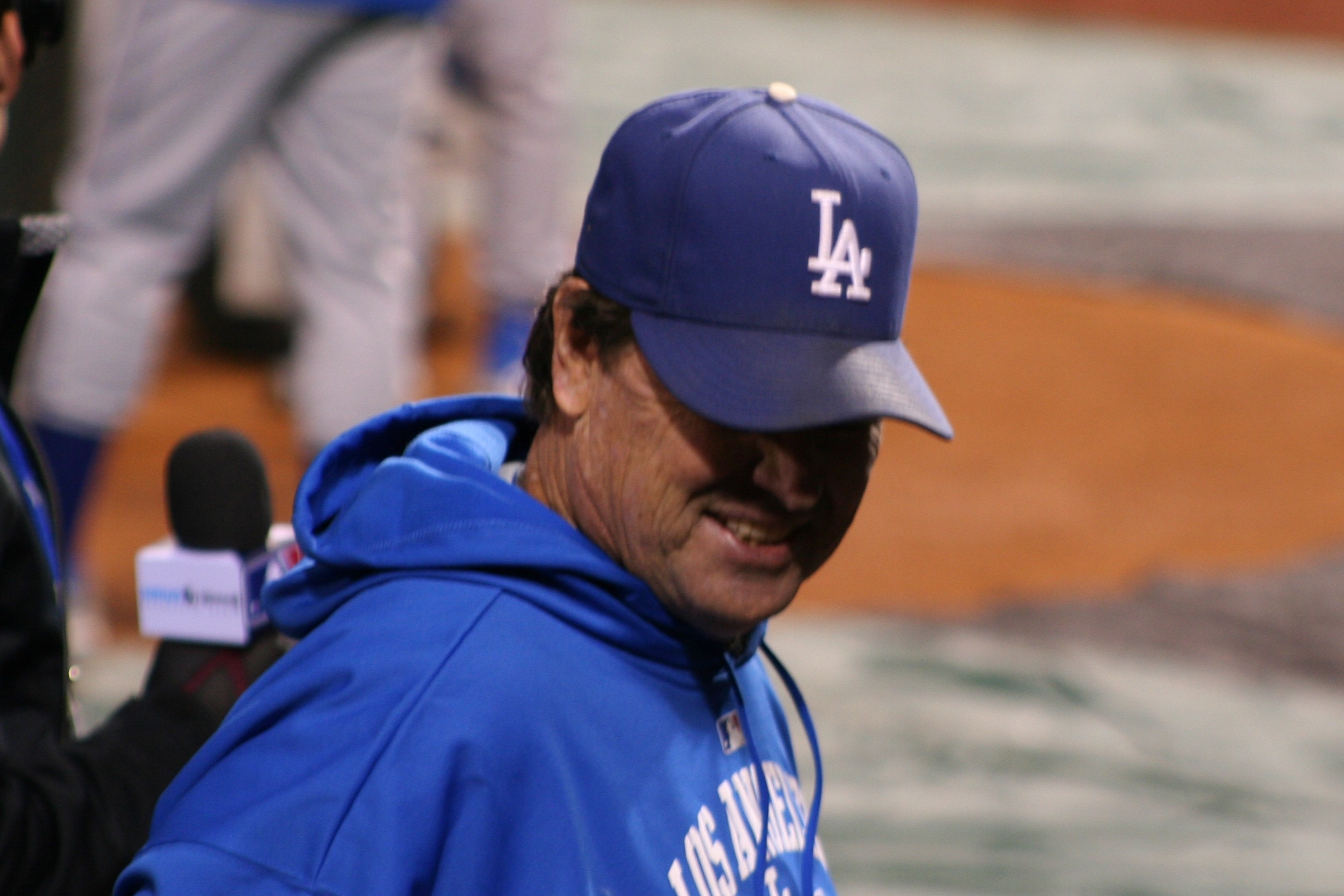
Former Dodgers pitching coach Rick Honeycutt

- Ted Lyons (1954)
- Joe Becker (1955–1964)
- Lefty Phillips (1965–1968)
- Red Adams (1969–1980)
- Ron Perranoski (1981–1994)
- Dave Wallace (1995–1997)
- Glenn Gregson (1998)
- Charlie Hough (1998–1999)
- Claude Osteen (1999–2000)
- Dave Wallace (2000)
- Jim Colborn (2001–2005)
- Rick Honeycutt (2006–2019)
- Mark Prior (2020–present)

== First base coach ==
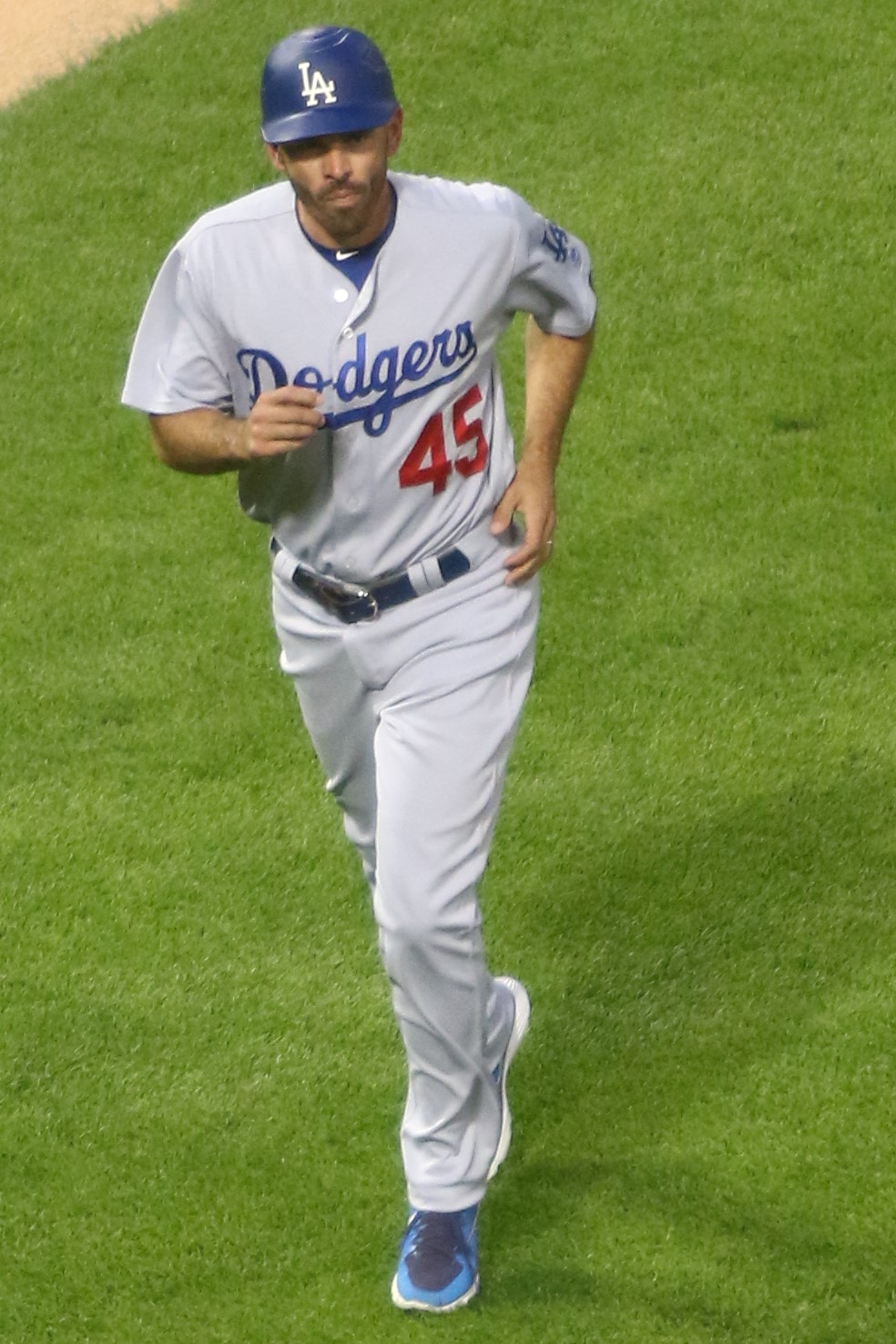
Dodgers first base coach Chris Woodward

- Jimmy Johnston (1931)
- Freddie Fitzsimmons (1940)
- Van Lingle Mungo (1940)
- Red Corriden (1941–1946)
- Jake Pitler (1947–1957)
- Greg Mulleavy (1958–1960, 1962–1964)
- Jim Gilliam (1965–1973)
- Monty Basgall (1977–1979)
- Jim Lefebvre (1978–1979)
- Manny Mota (1980)
- Monty Basgall (1981–1986)
- Joe Ferguson (1990, 1992)
- Ben Hines (1993)
- Reggie Smith (1994–1998)
- John Shelby (1998–2005)
- Mariano Duncan (2006–2010)
- Davey Lopes (2011–2015)
- George Lombard (2016–2020)
- Clayton McCullough (2021–2024)
- Chris Woodward (2025–present)

== Third base coach ==
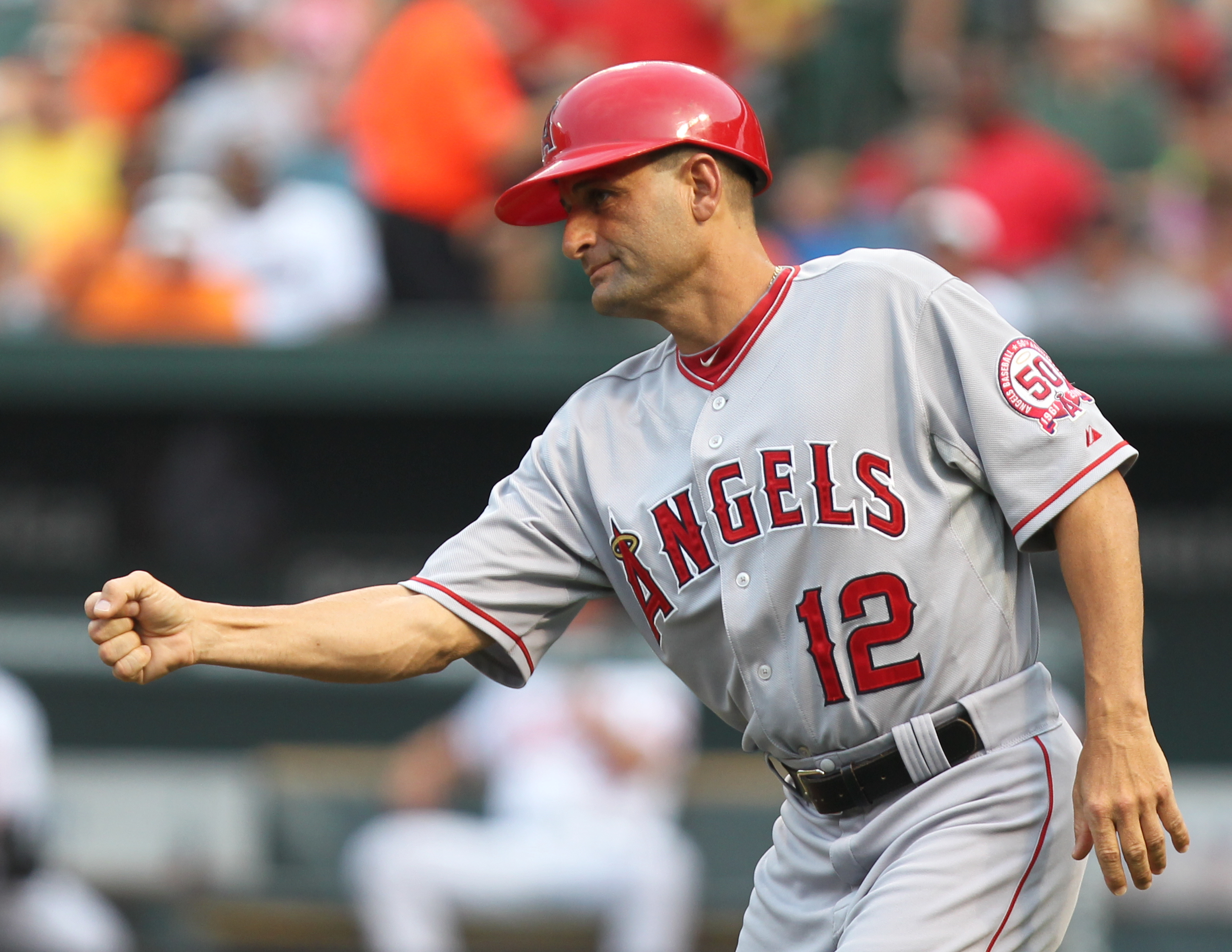
Dodgers third base coach Dino Ebel

- Danny Ozark (1965-1972)
- Preston Gómez (1977–1979)
- Danny Ozark (1980-1982)
- Joey Amalfitano (1983–1998)
- Glenn Hoffman (1999–2005)
- Rich Donnelly (2006–2007)
- Larry Bowa (2008–2010)
- Tim Wallach (2011–2013)
- Lorenzo Bundy (2014–2015)
- Ron Roenicke (2015)
- Chris Woodward (2016–2018)
- Dino Ebel (2019–present)

== Bullpen coach ==
- Carroll Beringer (1967–1972)
- Mark Cresse (1974–1998)
- Glenn Hoffman (1999)
- Rick Dempsey (1999–2000)
- Jim Lett (2001–2004)
- Dan Warthen (2006–2007)
- Ken Howell (2008–2012)
- Chuck Crim (2013–2015)
- Josh Bard (2016–2017)
- Mark Prior (2018–2019)
- Josh Bard (2020–present)

== Assistant hitting coach ==
- Jeff Pentland (2009–2010)
- Dave Hansen (2011)
- John Valentin (2013–2015)
- Tim Hyers (2016–2017)
- Brant Brown (2018)
- Luis Ortiz (2018)
- Aaron Bates (2019–2022)

== Assistant pitching coach ==
- Ken Howell (2013–2015)
- Connor McGuiness (2020–present)

== Bullpen catcher ==
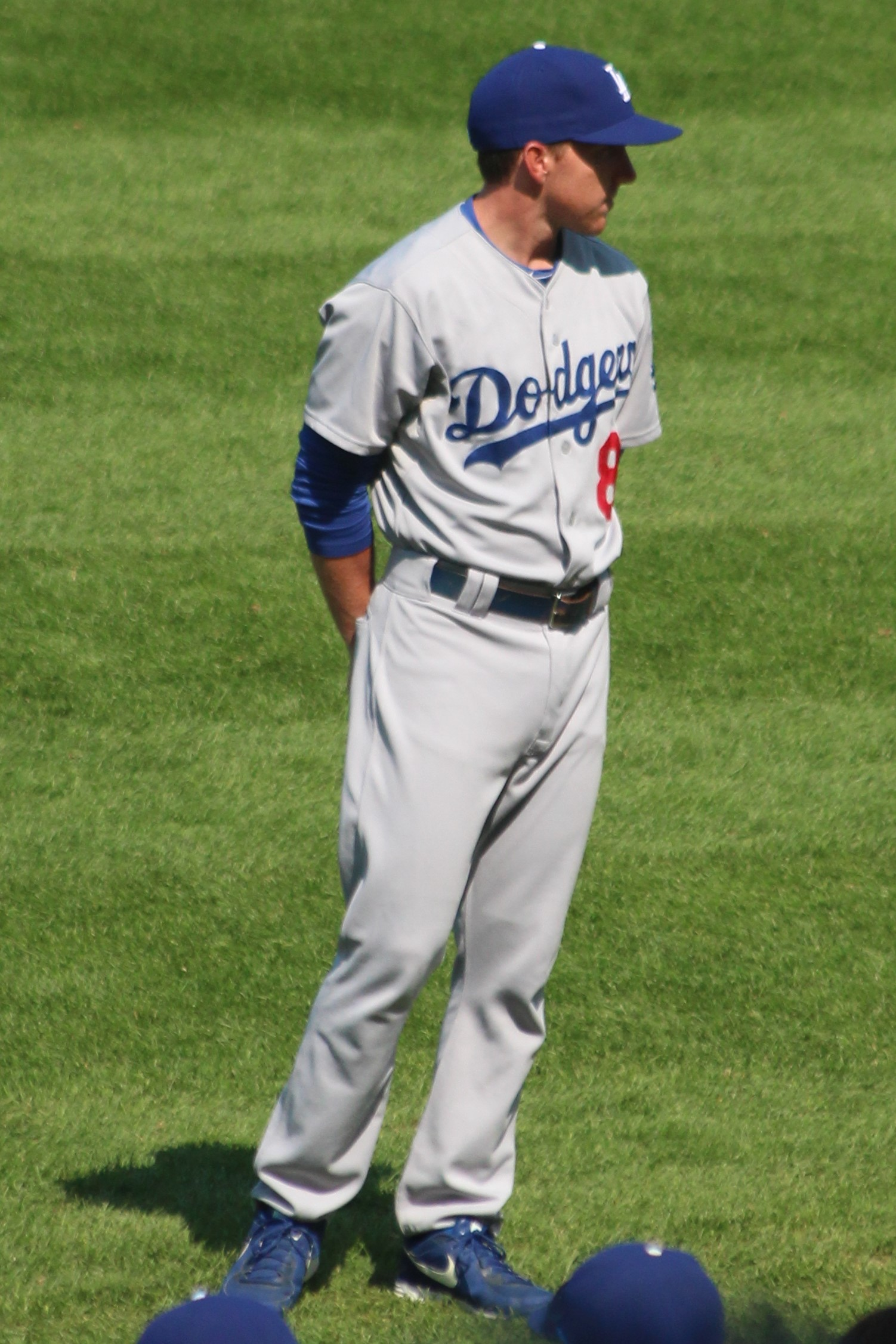
Dodgers bullpen catcher Steve Cilladi

- Travis Barbary (1998–2001)
- Rob Flippo (2002–2017)
- Mike Borzello (2007–2011)
- Fumi Ishibashi (2013, 2018)
- Steve Cilladi (2014–2023)
- Hamlet Marte (2024–present)
- Francisco Herrera (2025–present)

== Other assistant coaches ==
- Monty Basgall (1973–1976)
- Ray Blades (1947–1948)
- Bobby Bragan (1960)
- Brant Brown (hitting strategist, 2019–2020)
- Clay Bryant (1961)
- Lorenzo Bundy (outfield coach, 2015)
- Juan Castro (quality assurance coach 2016–2017)
- Charlie Dressen (1939–1942, 1945–1946, 1958–1959)
- Leo Durocher (1961–1964)
- Ben Egan (1925)
- Freddie Fitzsimmons (1942)
- Bob Geren (Major League field coordinator, 2023–present)
- Chris Gimenez (Game Planning, 2019)
- Preston Gómez (1965–1968)
- Jesse Haines (1938)
- Roy Hartsfield (1969–1972)
- Ray Hayworth (1945)
- Andy High (1937–1938)
- Joe Kelley (1926)
- Bill Killefer (1939)
- Tommy Lasorda (1973–1976)
- Cookie Lavagetto (1951–1953)
- Danny Lehman (2018, 2020-2022, game planning and communication coach)
- Brandon McDaniel (Major League Development & Integration coach, 2025–present)
- Joe McGinnity (1926)
- Otto Miller (1926–1936)
- Manny Mota (1990-2013)
- Ivy Olson (1924, 1930–1931)
- Danny Ozark (1965–1972, 1980–1982)
- Pee Wee Reese (1959)
- Pete Reiser (1960–1964)
- Ron Roenicke (1992–1993)
- Bill Russell (1987–1989, 1991)
- Babe Ruth (1938)
- Casey Stengel (1932–1933, 1949–1950)
- Zack Taylor (1935)
- Ben Tincup (1940)
- Rube Walker (1958)
- Steve Yeager (catching instructor, 2012–2018)
