= Jim Lett =

American baseball player (born 1951)

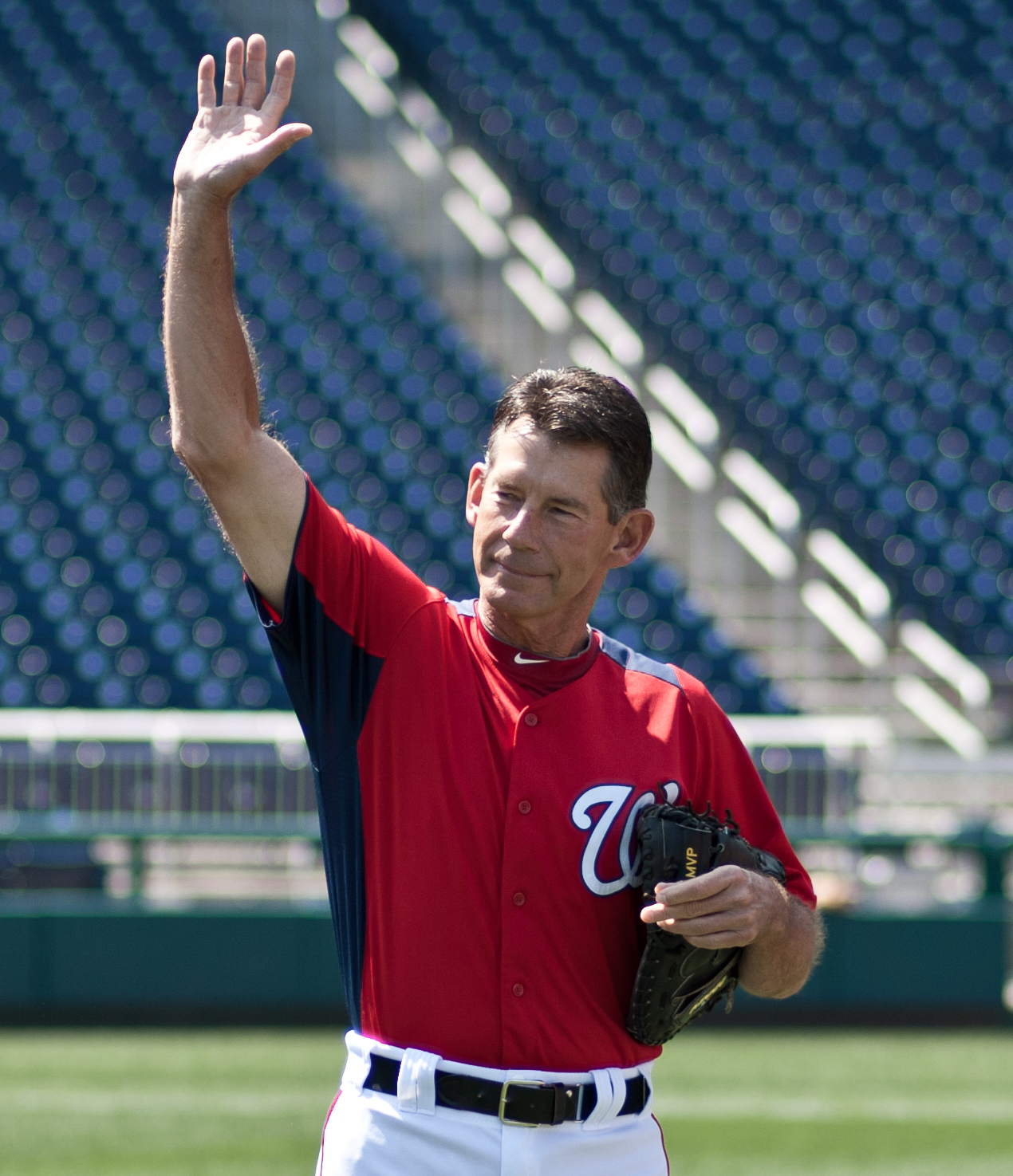
- Lett in 2011
- Born: January 3, 1951 (age 75); Charleston, West Virginia, U.S.
- Bats: Right Throws: Right
- Stats at Baseball Reference

Teams
- As coach: Cincinnati Reds (1986–1989, 1996); Toronto Blue Jays (1997–1999); Los Angeles Dodgers (2001–2005); Pittsburgh Pirates (2006–2007); Washington Nationals (2010–2013)

James Curtis Lett (born January 3, 1951) is an American retired baseball player, and a former coach for several teams. He was born in Charleston, West Virginia.

== Biography ==
Lett is a 1969 graduate of Winfield High School in Winfield, West Virginia, where he played football, basketball and ran track. He earned All-State honors in basketball as the top scorer in the state and All-America honors in football as a quarterback. He is a 1973 graduate of the University of Kentucky, where he was selected to the All-Southeastern Conference baseball team in 1971. He also was a quarterback on the Wildcats football team. Lett earned a B.S. degree in Geography.

Lett has worked in professional baseball as a player, coach, manager and front office executive in each of the last 32 years, having spent 24 of those years within the Cincinnati Reds organization (1973–96).

He began his career as a player with Tampa Tarpons (a Reds' Minor league baseball team) in 1973. After playing three years of minor league baseball (1973–75) and compiling a .256 batting average, six home runs, and 110 RBI in 313 games, Lett began his managerial career with the Shelby Reds in the Western Carolinas League in 1977. He was selected as the league's Manager of the Year in 1978 after guiding the club to a second-place finish and a 75–64 record.

Lett was a minor league manager in the Reds' chain from 1977 to 1985. He was the Reds' bench coach from 1986 to 1989 and again in 1996. He managed in the minors again in 1990, winning the lone South Atlantic League championship for the Charleston Wheelers, coached for the Nashville Sounds in 1991–92, and spent 1993–95 as the Reds' minor-league field coordinator.

After leaving the Reds, Lett was a member of the Toronto Blue Jays coaching staff from 1997 to 1999. He was the Blue Jays' assistant director of player development in 2000.

With the Los Angeles Dodgers, Lett served on manager Jim Tracy's staff, as bullpen coach from 2001 through 2004 and as bench coach in 2005.

On November 1, 2005, Lett was named the Pittsburgh Pirates' bench coach. In his role with the Pirates, Lett coordinated the day-to-day activities of the uniformed personnel with the manager, coaches, trainers and front office staff. He also acted as the club's catching instructor. When the Pirates fired Tracy in October 2007, Lett was encouraged to seek other forms of employment. Lett was not retained by the Pirates and subsequently was hired by the Milwaukee Brewers to coach for his hometown team, the Class-A West Virginia Power. The team plays its home games in downtown Charleston at Appalachian Power Park.

While overseeing the Dodgers' bullpen in 2003, he helped guide the pen to a major-league low 2.46 ERA, the lowest mark by any bullpen since the 1990 Oakland Athletics posted a 2.35 ERA. The next year, Los Angeles relievers ranked second in the major leagues with a 3.06 ERA.

In his tenure as a coach in the majors, Lett has worked with four Cy Young Award recipients: Toronto's Pat Hentgen (1996 winner), two-time winner Roger Clemens (1997–98) and Eric Gagné (2003). Lett also coached Hall of Fame reliever Trevor Hoffman in the minor leagues, helping to convert him from a shortstop to pitcher.

Preceded by	Cincinnati Reds Bench Coach; 1986 – 1989, 1996	Succeeded by Tommy Helms
Preceded by	Toronto Blue Jays Bench Coach; 1998 - 1999	Succeeded by
Preceded by Rick Dempsey	Los Angeles Dodgers Bullpen Coach; 2001 – 2004	Succeeded by Dan Warthen
Preceded by Jim Riggleman	Los Angeles Dodgers Bench Coach; 2005	Succeeded by Dave Jauss
Preceded by Pete Mackanin	Pittsburgh Pirates Bench Coach; 2006 – 2007	Succeeded by Gary Varsho
Preceded by Corey Hart	West Virginia Power Hitting Coach; 2008 – 2009	Succeeded by
Preceded by Randy Knorr	Washington Nationals Bullpen Coach; 2010 – 2013	Succeeded by Matthew LeCroy
