= Dave Jauss =

American baseball coach (born 1957)

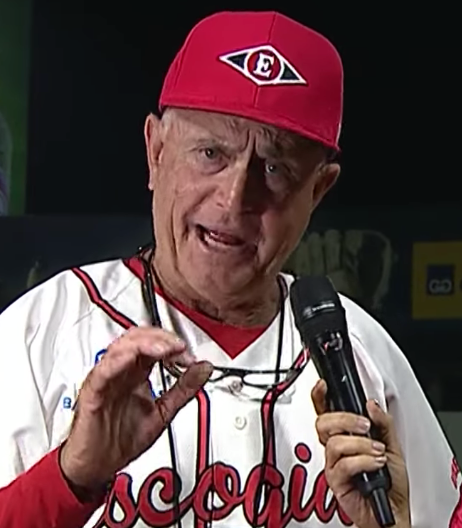
- Jauss with Leones del Escogido in 2022

Washington Nationals
- Coach
- Born: January 16, 1957 (age 69); Chicago, Illinois, U.S.
- Stats at Baseball Reference

Teams
- As coach: Boston Red Sox (1997–1999; 2001); Los Angeles Dodgers (2006–2007); Baltimore Orioles (2008–2009); New York Mets (2010); Pittsburgh Pirates (2013–2019); New York Mets (2021)

David Patrick Jauss (born January 16, 1957) is an American professional baseball coach and scout who currently serves as an advisor in the Washington Nationals organization. He previously served as a coach for the New York Mets, Boston Red Sox, Los Angeles Dodgers, Baltimore Orioles and Pittsburgh Pirates.

== College career ==
Jauss attended school at Amherst College, where he was a teammate of future MLB general manager Dan Duquette.

He was the captain of both the baseball and basketball teams at Amherst. He also received a B.A. in psychology and a M.S. in Sport Management from what is now the Isenberg School of Management's Mark H. McCormack Department of Sport Management at the University of Massachusetts Amherst.

Jauss served as the head baseball coach at Westfield State College in 1982–84, and then Atlantic Christian College in 1985–87.

== Professional career ==
In 1988, when Duquette became the Montreal Expos' director of player development, Jauss was hired by field coordinator Jerry Manuel as a manager in the Expos' farm system. Between 1988 and 1994, Jauss managed the Gulf Coast Expos, West Palm Beach Expos, and Harrisburg Senators. He compiled a record of 188–151 in that role and was named the Eastern League Manager of the Year in 1994. He also managed winter baseball in the Dominican Republic and led Licey to the Caribbean Series title in 1999. That winter, Jauss was named Manager of the Year. In 1995, Jauss was the field coordinator for player development of the Baltimore Orioles, and the following year, he became the advance scout for the Boston Red Sox, reunited with Duquette.

=== Major League Baseball ===
In 1997, he was named the Red Sox first base coach, a position he held between 1997 and 1999. It was there he met Grady Little who was serving as the team's bench coach at the time. Jauss then served as the Red Sox minor league field coordinator from 2000–01. In 2001, Jauss became the Red Sox bench coach; In 2002, he was their director of player development and from 2003–05 he was the Red Sox' Major League advance scout, playing a role in the club's 2004 World Series triumph.

In 2006, he was named bench coach of the Dodgers under manager Grady Little, a position he held through 2007. During the 2008–2009 seasons, he was the bench coach for the Baltimore Orioles. Jauss left the Orioles after the 2009 season He was the bench coach for the New York Mets in 2010; then, in November 2011, he was named to the Pirates' professional scouting staff, serving one season before returning to coaching. He served as the bench coach only for the 2016 season.

On December 13, 2020, Jauss was announced as the bench coach for the New York Mets for the 2021 season replacing Hensley Meulens.

On July 12, 2021, Jauss was the pitcher for the All-Star Game Home Run Derby winner Pete Alonso.

On January 18, 2022, the Washington Nationals announced Jauss had been hired by the team as a senior advisor in their player development system.

== Personal life ==
He is the son of the late Bill Jauss, longtime sportswriter for the Chicago Tribune and panelist on the television program The Sportswriters on TV. His son D.J. was drafted by the Nationals 874th overall, in the 29th round of the 2014 MLB draft.

Sporting positions
Preceded by Jerry Manuel	Gulf Coast League Expos Manager; 1988	Succeeded by Jerry Weinstein
Preceded by Felipe Alou	West Palm Beach Expos Manager; 1992	Succeeded by Rob Leary
Preceded by Jim Tracy	Harrisburg Senators Manager; 1994	Succeeded by Pat Kelly
Preceded by Frank White	Boston Red Sox First-Base Coach; 1997–1999	Succeeded by Tommy Harper
Preceded by Buddy Bailey	Boston Red Sox Bench Coach; 2001	Succeeded by Mike Stanley
Preceded by Jim Lett	Los Angeles Dodgers Bench Coach; 2006–2007	Succeeded by Bob Schaefer
Preceded by Tom Trebelhorn	Baltimore Orioles Bench Coach; 2008–2009	Succeeded by Jeff Datz
Preceded by Sandy Alomar Sr.	New York Mets Bench Coach; 2010	Succeeded by Ken Oberkfell
Preceded by Brad Fischer	Pittsburgh Pirates Bench Coach; 2016	Succeeded by Tom Prince
Preceded by Hensley Meulens	New York Mets Bench Coach; 2021	Succeeded by Glenn Sherlock
