= Bob Geren =

American baseball player, coach, and manager (born 1961)

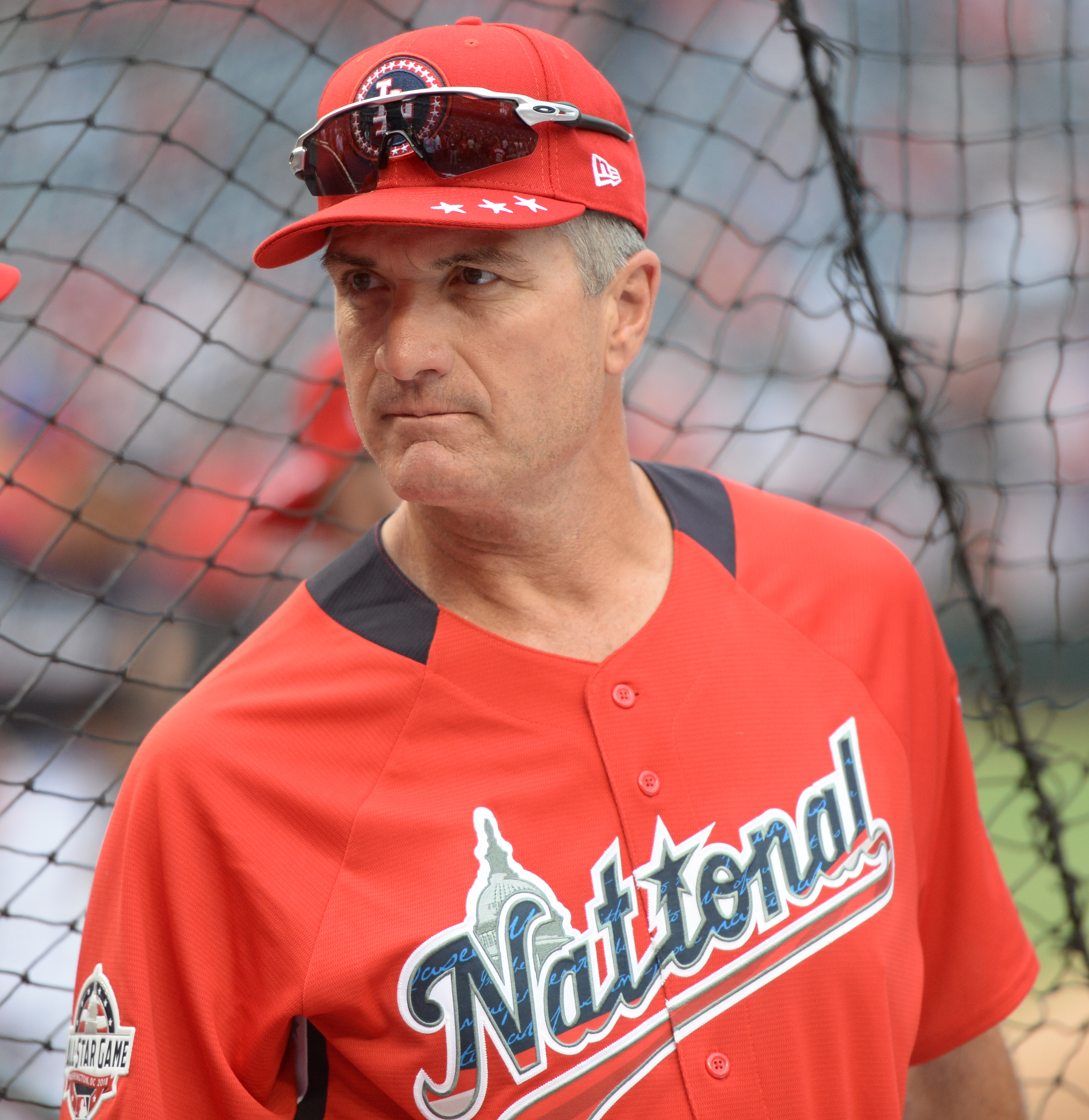
- Geren representing the Los Angeles Dodgers at the 2018 MLB All-Star Game

Los Angeles Dodgers – No. 88
- Catcher / Manager / Coach
- Born: September 22, 1961 (age 65); San Diego, California, U.S.
- Batted: Right Threw: Right

MLB debut
- May 17, 1988, for the New York Yankees

Last MLB appearance
- July 26, 1993, for the San Diego Padres

MLB statistics
- Batting average: .233
- Home runs: 22
- Runs batted in: 76
- Managerial record: 334–376
- Winning %: .470
- Stats at Baseball Reference

Teams
- As player: New York Yankees (1988–1991); San Diego Padres (1993); As manager: Oakland Athletics (2007–2011); As coach: Oakland Athletics (2003–2006); New York Mets (2012–2015); Los Angeles Dodgers (2016–present)

Career highlights and awards
- 3× World Series champion (2020, 2024, 2025)

Robert Peter Geren (born September 22, 1961) is an American former professional baseball catcher and manager, who played in Major League Baseball (MLB) for the New York Yankees (1988–1991) and San Diego Padres (1993). Geren managed the Oakland Athletics from 2007 through 2011. He has served in various coaching capacities for the A's and New York Mets, and Los Angeles Dodgers. He is currently the major league field coordinator for the Dodgers. Geren is a three-time World Series champion (2020, 2024 and 2025).

== Playing career ==
Geren was drafted by the San Diego Padres in the first round with the 24th pick of the 1979 draft. After spending 10 years in the minor leagues, he made his major league debut for the New York Yankees in 1988, playing with New York through 1991.

He spent the first two seasons backing up Don Slaught. In 1990, he had his statistically best season as the starting Yankees' catcher. In 110 games, he had a .213 batting average with 8 home runs and 31 runs batted in. On July 1, 1990, he was the catcher when Andy Hawkins no-hit the Chicago White Sox but lost 4–0, the White Sox scoring all four runs in the eighth courtesy of three Yankee errors. (With the change of the definition of a no-hitter the following year, this no-hitter would be taken off the record books.)

After spending 1992 in the minors with the Pawtucket Red Sox, he played his final season of baseball in 1993 with the San Diego Padres, the team that originally drafted him.

== Coaching career ==
=== Minor League manager ===
Geren was hired by then Boston Red Sox director of player development Bob Schaefer to manage in the Red Sox minor league system. He managed for the Red Sox from 1995 to 1998 at the Rookie and Class A levels before leaving to join the Oakland Athletics' organization. Geren managed the Athletics' Single-A affiliate Modesto A's during the 1999 season and won the California League Manager of the Year award.

Geren with the Sacramento River Cats in 2001

He next was named the first-ever manager of the Oakland Athletics' Triple-A affiliate Sacramento River Cats. Geren managed the River Cats for three seasons (2000–2002). During his managing in the Athletics' minor league system, Geren worked under A's General Manager Billy Beane, a longtime friend and former high school baseball opponent. Under Geren's management, the Rivercats won Pacific Coast League division titles in 2000 and 2001.

During the winter, Geren managed the Tigres del Licey in the Dominican Baseball League, winning the league championship in the 2001–2002 season. In February 2002, Geren led Licey to a second-place finish in the 2002 Caribbean Series held in Caracas, Venezuela. The 2002 Dominican Republic team included notable MLB players Vladimir Guerrero, Miguel Tejada, and Odalis Perez. Geren later returned to the Dominican Republic in the winter of 2005 to manage the Leones del Escogido.

Geren's lifetime minor league managerial record was 452–390.

Geren was called to the major leagues in 2003 where he first served as the bullpen coach for the Oakland Athletics. Geren was eventually promoted to bench coach, a position he held through 2006.

=== Oakland Athletics manager ===
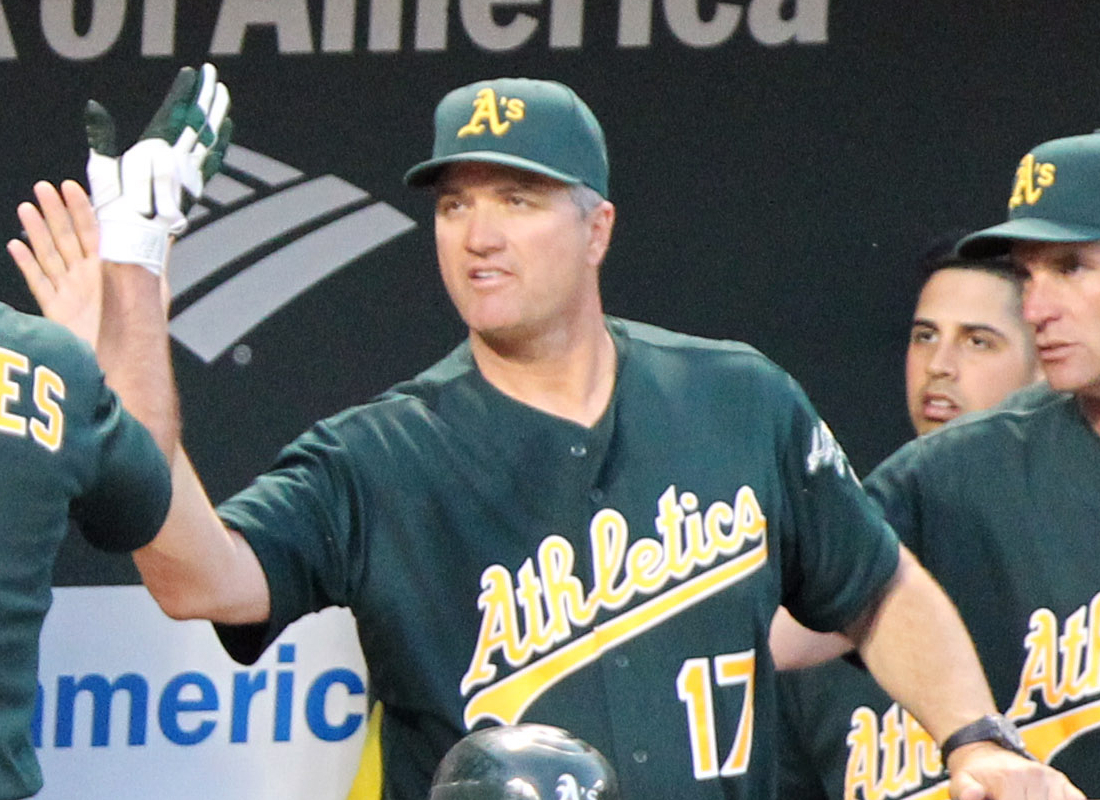
Geren managing the Athletics in 2011

On November 17, 2006, Geren was promoted from his previous position as Athletics bench coach to become the 28th manager in Oakland Athletics franchise history. He replaced Ken Macha, who was fired after disagreements with players and general manager Billy Beane. In 2007, Geren led the A's to a 76–86 record. In 2008, the Athletics finished the season with a 75–86 record.

In March 2009, the A's and Geren agreed to a contract extension for one year, with an additional options year. During the 2010 season, the A's finished with an even .500 winning percentage (81–81 record). On September 11, 2010, MLB.com announced that Oakland had exercised Geren's option for 2011, assuring him another season in the green and gold.

In May 2011, Geren's managerial style came under scrutiny by Bay Area press when reliever Brian Fuentes criticized Geren's communication style after he was replaced as the A's closer amid poor performance in the role. Fuentes later apologized to Geren for going public with his comments, and A's owner Lew Wolff endorsed Geren as the A's manager. Geren's last game as manager was June 9, 2011; he was subsequently fired and replaced with Bob Melvin.

=== New York Mets ===
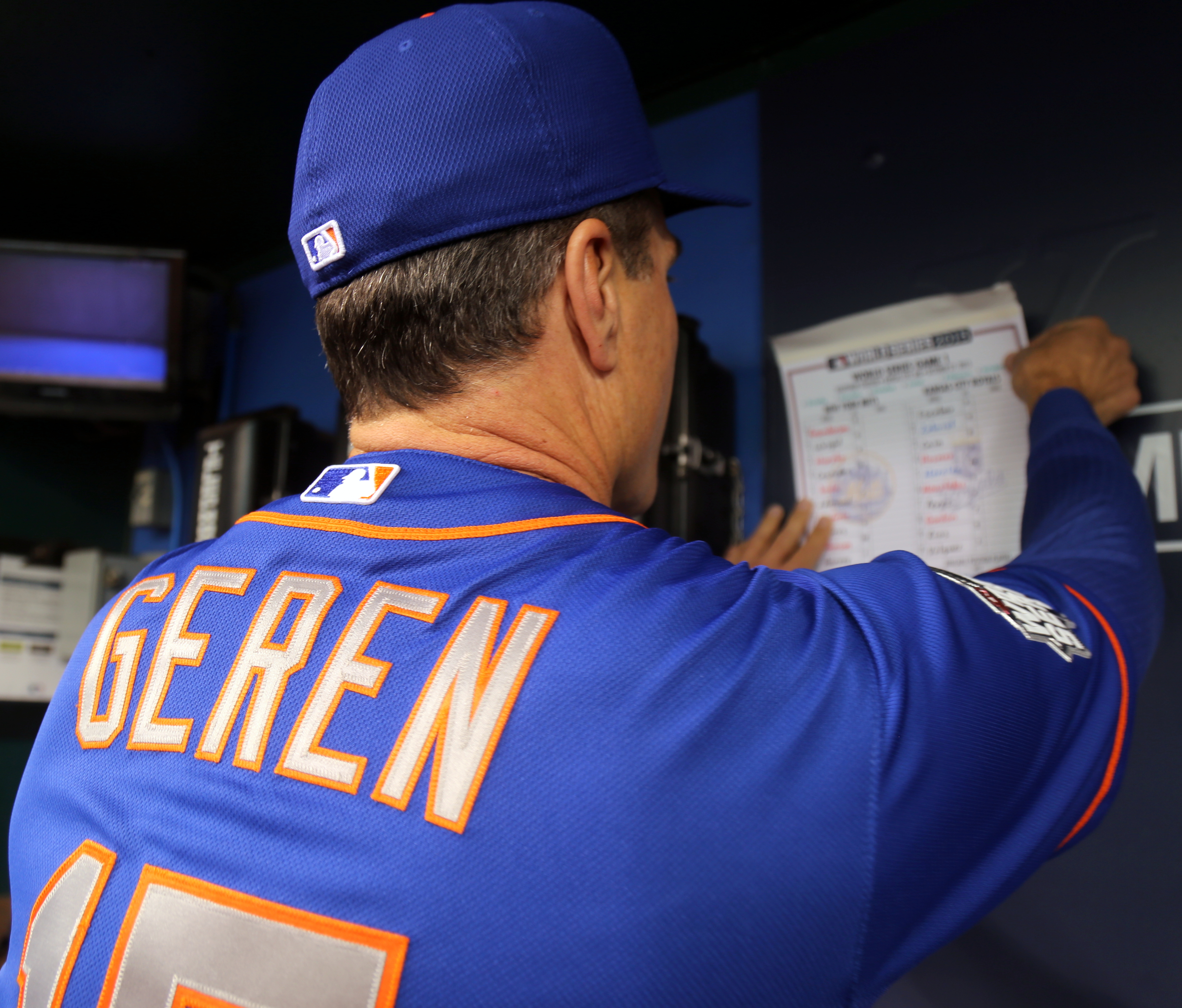
Geren as bench coach for the New York Mets during the 2015 World Series.

On October 14, 2011, the New York Mets hired Geren to be the team's new bench coach replacing former bench coach Ken Oberkfell. During the 2015 season, the Mets won the National League Championship Series and played in the World Series against the Kansas City Royals. The Royals eventually won the 2015 World Series in five games. During his time with the Mets, Geren was praised for his "statistical aptitude" and "strong working knowledge of advanced analytics." Mets General Manager Sandy Alderson also complimented Geren for being "tuned into analytics."

=== Los Angeles Dodgers ===
On December 2, 2015, it was reported that the Los Angeles Dodgers hired Geren to be the team's new bench coach serving under new manager Dave Roberts and replacing former bench coach Tim Wallach. Geren said his decision to leave the Mets for Los Angeles was fueled by a desire to be closer to his family in Southern California. During the 2016 season, his first with the Dodgers, Geren coached under manager Dave Roberts, who would go on to win the 2016 National League Manager of the Year Award. In 2017, the Dodgers won the National League Championship Series and played against the Houston Astros in the World Series. In 2018, the Dodgers appeared in their second straight World Series and played against the Boston Red Sox. Geren won his first World Series in the 2020 season, as the Dodgers defeated the Tampa Bay Rays in six games.

For the 2023 season, Geren transitioned from his role as bench coach to take on the newly created coaching position of major league field coordinator. In the 2024 and 2025 seasons, Geren won back-to-back World Series championships with the Dodgers.

== Personal life ==
Geren and his wife, Pam, reside in Southern California. Geren has two sons, Bobby and Brett, who both played NCAA Division I baseball at Princeton University.

Geren's personal life has been featured on several episodes of Spectrum SportsNet LA's television show "Backstage: Dodgers." In 2019, the program featured Geren's longtime hobby of racing cars and included footage of Geren's ride along with former racing driver Mario Andretti before the 2019 Acura Grand Prix of Long Beach. In 2016, Geren, known as an avid cyclist, was interviewed while riding his bicycle to work at Dodger Stadium for a Dodgers home game.

While with the Yankees, he appeared on the CBS daytime version of Family Feud hosted by Ray Combs with other members of his family late in 1988. The Gerens appeared on 5 episodes and won a total of $7,666.

== Managerial record ==
As of November 1, 2020

Team	From	To	Regular season record		
Team	From	To	W	L	Win %
Oakland Athletics	2007	2011	334	376	.470

== See also ==
Sporting positions
Preceded by Dave Holt	Utica Blue Sox manager 1995	Succeeded by Steve McFarland
Preceded by Félix Maldonado	Gulf Coast League Red Sox manager 1996	Succeeded by Luis Aguayo
Preceded by Rob Derksen	Sarasota Red Sox manager 1998	Succeeded by Butch Hobson
Preceded by Juan Navarette	Modesto A's manager 1999	Succeeded by Greg Sparks
Preceded by first manager	Sacramento River Cats manager 2000–2002	Succeeded by Tony DeFrancesco
Preceded by Brad Fischer	Oakland Athletics bullpen coach 2003–2005	Succeeded by Brad Fischer
Preceded by Rene Lachemann	Oakland Athletics bench coach 2006	Succeeded by Bob Schaefer
Preceded by Ken Oberkfell	New York Mets bench coach 2012–2015	Succeeded by Dick Scott
Preceded by Tim Wallach	Los Angeles Dodgers Bench Coach; 2016–2022	Succeeded by Danny Lehmann
