= Jim Riggleman =

American baseball coach and manager (born 1952)

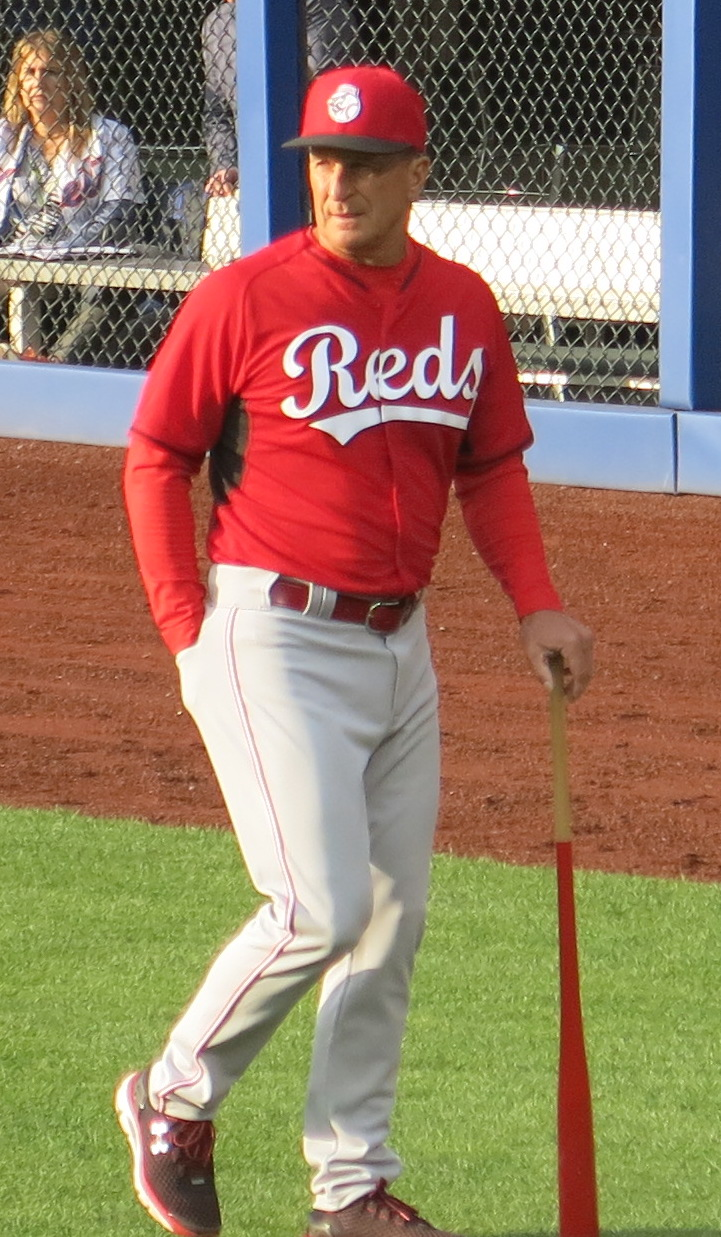
- Riggleman with the Cincinnati Reds
- Born: November 9, 1952 (age 73); Fort Dix, New Jersey, U.S.
- Bats: Right Throws: Right

MLB statistics
- Games managed: 1,630
- Win–loss record: 726–904
- Winning %: .445
- Stats at Baseball Reference
- Managerial record at Baseball Reference

Teams
- As manager: San Diego Padres (1992–1994); Chicago Cubs (1995–1999); Seattle Mariners (2008); Washington Nationals (2009–2011); Cincinnati Reds (2018); As coach: St. Louis Cardinals (1989–1990); Cleveland Indians (2000); Los Angeles Dodgers (2001–2004); Seattle Mariners (2008); Washington Nationals (2009); Cincinnati Reds (2015–2018); New York Mets (2019)

James David Riggleman (born November 9, 1952) is an American former Major League Baseball (MLB) manager and bench coach who coached with several teams between 1989 and 2019.

During his playing career, Riggleman was an infielder and outfielder in the Los Angeles Dodgers and St. Louis Cardinals minor league systems from 1974 to 1981. After his playing career ended, he managed in the Cardinals and San Diego Padres minor league systems until 1992, when he became the Padres' manager. From 1992 to 2011 Riggleman managed the Padres, Chicago Cubs, Seattle Mariners, and Washington Nationals, and also served as a major league coach with the Dodgers, Mariners, and Nationals between his managerial stints. His most recent major league managerial job was with the Nationals, a post he resigned from on June 23, 2011. Subsequently, he was employed as a scout with the San Francisco Giants. In 2015 he became a coach with the Cincinnati Reds. On April 19, 2018, he became the Reds' interim manager after Bryan Price was fired.

== Playing career ==
Riggleman attended Frostburg State University. In 1972 and 1973 he played collegiate summer baseball with the Falmouth Commodores of the Cape Cod Baseball League, and was named a league all-star in 1973. He was selected by the Los Angeles Dodgers in the 1974 MLB draft, and was assigned to the double-A level Waterbury Dodgers, where he played third base and second base. During the 1976 season, Riggleman transferred to the St. Louis Cardinals, where he was assigned to the double-A Arkansas Travelers and played in both infield and outfield. His career peaked at the triple-A level, which he reached in the Cardinals organization in 1977 and 1979. Riggleman's playing career ended after the 1981 season at the age of 28.

== Coaching and managing career ==
=== St. Louis Cardinals (1983–1990) ===
In 1983, Riggleman became manager of the St. Petersburg Cardinals, a Class-A affiliate of the St. Louis Cardinals, in the Florida State League. He next managed at the Double-A level in the Cardinals organization—including with the Arkansas Travelers, the team which he spent most of his playing career with.

=== San Diego Padres (1992–1994) ===
Riggleman made his major league managerial debut with the San Diego Padres late in the 1992 season—after already managing a full season with the Triple-A Las Vegas Stars—due to the late season departure of Greg Riddoch, and was retained through the 1994 season. He finished with a record of 112 wins and 179 losses.

=== Chicago Cubs (1995–1999) ===
In 1995 he became manager of the Chicago Cubs. In 1998, Riggleman's Cubs earned a wild card postseason appearance that ultimately resulted in a loss to the Atlanta Braves in the National League Division Series. Riggleman would manage the Cubs through the 1999 season. He finished with a record of 374 wins and 419 losses.

=== Los Angeles Dodgers (2001–2004) ===
Riggleman spent the period from 2001 to 2004 as bench coach for the Los Angeles Dodgers under manager Jim Tracy.

=== Seattle Mariners (2008) ===
Riggleman began the 2008 season as the bench coach for the Seattle Mariners under new manager John McLaren. He was promoted to interim manager upon McLaren's dismissal on June 19, 2008, but was not retained by the Mariners after the season ended. He finished with a record of 36 wins and 54 losses.

=== Washington Nationals (2009–2011) ===
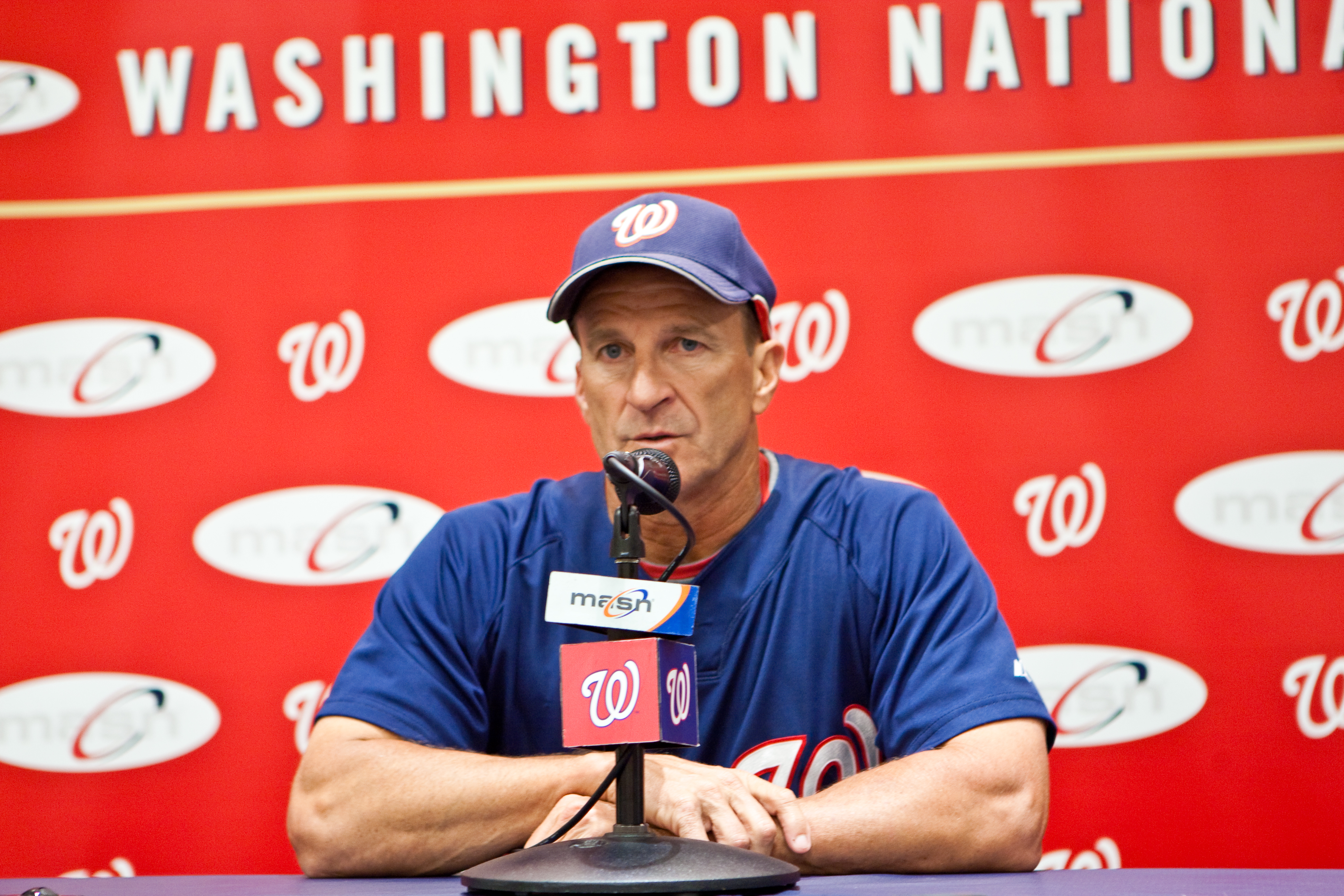
Riggleman with the Nationals

Riggleman was named bench coach for the Washington Nationals for the 2009 season, and was promoted to interim manager on July 12, 2009, following Manny Acta's midseason dismissal. Riggleman picked McLaren as his bench coach. Riggleman hired Burton Rocks as his agent to negotiate his managerial deal with the Washington Nationals in November 2009. The Nationals retained Riggleman as manager for the 2010 and 2011 seasons, but on June 23, 2011, he resigned as manager of the Nationals after a win against the Seattle Mariners and after the team won 11 of its previous 12 games. Riggleman was unhappy the team had yet to pick up his contract option for the 2012 season. He said he told team management before the game he "wanted to have a conversation" about his contract before the team left for a series against the Chicago White Sox, but "they didn't want to do that", so he offered his resignation. "I'm 58, I'm too old to be disrespected", he said. He finished with a record of 140 wins and 172 losses.

=== Cincinnati Reds (2012–2018) ===
For the 2012 season, Riggleman managed the Cincinnati Reds AA minor league affiliate, the Pensacola Blue Wahoos, ending the season with a 68–70 record. On December 12, 2012, Riggleman was promoted to manage the Reds' Class AAA team, the Louisville Bats, in 2013. On January 6, 2014, the Reds announced Riggleman would return as manager of the Bats in 2014. On November 10, 2014, the Reds announced Riggleman would be their third base coach for the 2015 season replacing Steve Smith. On April 19, 2018, Riggleman was named interim manager after the firing of Bryan Price. He was not retained as the manager after the 2018 season.

=== New York Mets (2019) ===
Riggleman was named the bench coach of the New York Mets on November 26, 2018, and was not retained after the 2019 season ended.

=== Billings Mustangs (2022) ===
Riggleman was the manager of the Billings Mustangs in the Pioneer League for the 2022 season.

=== Managerial record ===
As of games played on September 30, 2018.

Team	Year	Regular season					Postseason			
Team	Year	Games	Won	Lost	Win %	Finish	Won	Lost	Win %	Result
SD	1992	12	4	8	.333	interim	–	–	–	–
SD	1993	162	61	101	.377	7th in NL West	–	–	–	–
SD	1994	117	47	70	.402	fired	–	–	–	–
SD Total		291	112	179	.385		0	0	–	
CHC	1995	144	73	71	.507	3rd in NL Central	–	–	–	–
CHC	1996	162	76	86	.469	4th in NL Central	–	–	–	–
CHC	1997	162	68	94	.420	5th in NL Central	–	–	–	–
CHC	1998	163	90	73	.552	2nd in NL Central	0	3	.000	Lost NLDS (ATL)
CHC	1999	162	67	95	.417	6th in NL Central	–	–	–	–
CHC Total		793	374	419	.472		0	3	.000	
SEA	2008	90	36	54	.400	interim	–	–	–	–
SEA Total		90	36	54	.400		0	0	–	
WSH	2009	75	33	42	.440	interim	–	–	–	–
WSH	2010	162	69	93	.426	5th in NL East	–	–	–	–
WSH	2011	75	38	37	.507	resigned	–	–	–	–
WSH Total		312	140	172	.449		–	–	–	
CIN	2018	144	64	80	.444	interim	–	–	–	–
CIN Total		144	64	80	.444		0	0	–	
Total		1630	726	904	.445		0	3	.000	

== See also ==
- List of St. Louis Cardinals coaches

Sporting positions
Preceded by Nick Leyva	St. Petersburg Cardinals Manager; 1982–1984	Succeeded by Dave Bialas
Preceded by Dave Bialas	Arkansas Travelers Manager; 1985–1988	Succeeded by Darold Knowles
Preceded by Rich Hacker	St. Louis Cardinals First Base Coach; 1989–1990	Succeeded by Dave Collins
Preceded by Pat Kelly	Las Vegas Stars Manager; 1991–1992	Succeeded by Russ Nixon
Preceded by Jeff Newman	Cleveland Indians Third Base Coach; 2000	Succeeded by Joel Skinner
Preceded by Jim Tracy	Los Angeles Dodgers Bench Coach; 2001–2004	Succeeded by Jim Lett
Preceded by Mike Goff	Seattle Mariners Bench Coach; 2008	Succeeded by Lee Elia
Preceded by Pat Corrales	Washington Nationals Bench Coach; 2009	Succeeded by Pat Corrales
Preceded by Steve Smith	Cincinnati Reds Third Base Coach; 2015	Succeeded by Billy Hatcher
Preceded by Jay Bell	Cincinnati Reds Bench Coach; 2016–2018	Succeeded by Pat Kelly
Preceded by Gary DiSarcina	New York Mets Bench Coach; 2019	Succeeded by Hensley Meulens
