= Austin Wilson =

American baseball player (born 1992)

- Outfielder
- Born: February 7, 1992 (age 33); Los Angeles, California, U.S.
- Bats: Right Throws: Right
- Stats at Baseball Reference

Austin H. Wilson (born February 7, 1992) is an American former professional baseball outfielder. He attended Stanford University, where he played college baseball for the Stanford Cardinal team. He was projected to be a first round pick in the 2013 Major League Baseball draft but was chosen by the Seattle Mariners in the 2nd round.

== Amateur career ==
As a youth, Wilson played baseball in a local league in Southern California. His parents brought him to Reggie Smith's baseball clinic to receive further instruction. Wilson then attended Harvard-Westlake High School, where he was twice named a prep school All-American. Playing in a Southern California showcase before his junior year, Wilson earned attention from Major League Baseball teams. He then proceeded to compile a .543 batting average, seven home runs and 29 runs batted in in 23 games during his junior year. As a senior, Wilson batted .485 with a .802 slugging percentage.

Considered a five-tool prospect, Baseball America ranked Wilson the 27th best prospect available in the 2010 Major League Baseball draft, and he was widely projected to be a first-round draft pick in the 2010 Major League Baseball draft. Wilson committed to attend Stanford University to play college baseball for the Stanford Cardinal baseball team. Signability concerns led Wilson to fall to the 12th round of the draft, where the St. Louis Cardinals selected Wilson. Despite the Cardinals' efforts to convince Wilson to sign a professional contract, including making an offer equivalent to that given to first round picks, Wilson opted to enroll at Stanford.

As a freshman in 2011, Wilson earned an All-Pacific-10 Conference honorable mention after batting .313 with a team-leading four home runs during the regular season. During the summer of 2011, Wilson played summer collegiate baseball for the Harwich Mariners in the Cape Cod Baseball League, winning the league's championship, though he batted only. 204. Wilson returned to the Cape Cod League in 2012, improving his batting average. In 2013, Wilson was named a preseason All-American by Baseball America. He missed significant time during the 2013 season with an elbow injury. Returning from injury in April,

== Professional career ==
=== Seattle Mariners ===
Wilson was considered by some a potential first round pick in the 2013 Major League Baseball draft but was not selected in the first round. He was eventually picked with the 49th overall selection of the second round. Wilson signed with the Mariners, and played for the Everett AquaSox of the Low-A Northwest League in 2013, batting .241 with six home runs and 27 RBI. In 2014, Wilson played for the Clinton LumberKings of the Single-A Midwest League where he greatly improved, batting .291 with 12 home runs, 54 RBI, and a .893 OPS. He spent 2015 with the Bakersfield Blaze of the High-A California League where he posted a .239 average with ten home runs and 48 RBI. Wilson returned to Bakersfield in 2016 where he batted .226 with 13 home runs and 49 RBI.

=== St. Louis Cardinals ===
On December 8, 2016, at the Winter Meetings, the St. Louis Cardinals selected Wilson from the Mariners in the minor league phase of the Rule 5 draft. The Cardinals assigned him to the High-A Palm Beach Cardinals, and after batting .168 in 199 at-bats, he was released on July 4, 2017.

== Personal life ==
Wilson's parents both have Master of Business Administration degrees from Harvard University. Austin completed his degree at Stanford.

== See also ==
- Rule 5 draft results
