= Turner Ward =

American baseball player and coach (born 1965)

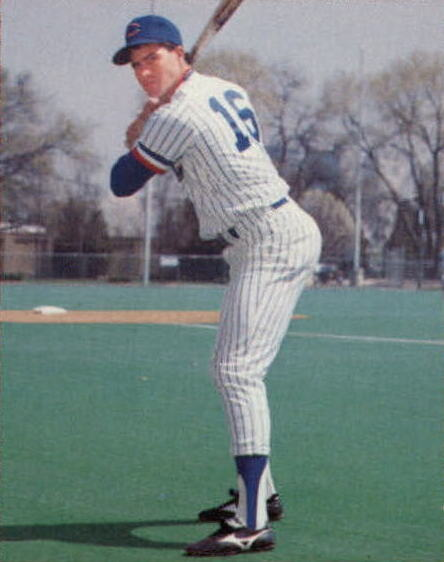
- Ward with the Columbus Clippers c. 1988
- Outfielder
- Born: April 11, 1965 (age 61); Orlando, Florida, U.S.
- Batted: Switch Threw: Right

MLB debut
- September 10, 1990, for the Cleveland Indians

Last MLB appearance
- July 27, 2001, for the Philadelphia Phillies

MLB statistics
- Batting average: .251
- Home runs: 39
- Runs batted in: 219
- Stats at Baseball Reference

Teams
- As player: Cleveland Indians (1990–1991); Toronto Blue Jays (1991–1993); Milwaukee Brewers (1994–1996); Pittsburgh Pirates (1997–1999); Arizona Diamondbacks (1999–2000); Philadelphia Phillies (2001); As coach: Arizona Diamondbacks (2013–2015); Los Angeles Dodgers (2016–2018); Cincinnati Reds (2019); St. Louis Cardinals (2022–2024)

Turner Max Ward (born April 11, 1965) is an American professional baseball coach and former outfielder. He played in Major League Baseball (MLB) for the Cleveland Indians, Toronto Blue Jays, Milwaukee Brewers, Pittsburgh Pirates, Arizona Diamondbacks, and Philadelphia Phillies from 1990 to 2001. He most recently worked in MLB as the hitting coach for the St. Louis Cardinals from 2023 to 2024.

== Playing career ==
Ward played college baseball at Coastal Alabama Community College - South and the University of South Alabama.

=== Cleveland Indians (1990–1991) ===
Ward was drafted by the New York Yankees in the 18th round of the 1986 Major League Baseball (MLB) draft. On March 19, 1989, the Yankees traded Ward and Joel Skinner to the Cleveland Indians for outfielder Mel Hall.

Ward made his MLB debut with Cleveland on September 10, 1990, as he went 0-for-4 while playing in right field in a 6–2 loss to the Chicago White Sox. On September 12, Ward earned his first MLB hit off Steve Rosenberg of the White Sox. In his third game on September 15, Ward went 3-for-5 with a triple, home run and six RBI in a 14–6 win over the Kansas City Royals. Ward hit his first career home run off Andy McGaffigan. Ward finished the season with a .348 batting average with one home run and 10 RBI in 14 games with Cleveland.

Ward began the 1991 season as the Indians starting right fielder, however, he got off to a slow start, batting .230 with no home runs and 5 RBI in 40 games. On June 27, the Indians traded Ward and Tom Candiotti to the Toronto Blue Jays for Denis Boucher, Glenallen Hill, Mark Whiten, and cash.

=== Toronto Blue Jays (1991–1993) ===
Ward spent most of his time with the Toronto Blue Jays' Triple-A affiliate, the Syracuse Chiefs of the International League, however, he was a September call-up, and in eight games with Toronto, Ward hit .308 with no home runs and two RBI in 13 at-bats.

Ward once again saw very limited action in 1992 with Toronto, playing in 18 games, where he hit .345 with one home run and three RBI. He did not play in any playoff games as Toronto won the 1992 World Series.

During the 1993 season, Ward advocated for more playing time. He played in 72 games with the Blue Jays. However, he struggled offensively, batting .192 with four home runs and 28 RBI. He did not play in the postseason, as the Blue Jays repeated as champions by winning the 1993 World Series.

=== Milwaukee Brewers (1994–1996) ===
On November 24, 1993, the Milwaukee Brewers selected Ward off waivers.

Ward became an everyday player with the Brewers during the 1994 season, splitting his time between all three outfield positions with the club. He played in 102 games, batting .232 with nine home runs and 45 RBI before the season was cut short due to the 1994 MLB strike.

Ward saw his playing time greatly decrease in 1995, as he played in only 44 games, batting .264 with four home runs and 16 RBI with the Brewers.

Ward began the 1996 season in a 1-for-20 slump. He played in 43 games, hitting only .179 with two home runs and 10 RBI. On November 1, the Brewers released Ward.

=== Pittsburgh Pirates (1997–1999) ===
Ward signed with the Pittsburgh Pirates on April 22, 1997 and had a very productive season as the team's fourth outfielder, batting .353 with seven home runs and 33 RBI in 71 games.

On May 3, 1998, Ward broke through the right field wall at Three Rivers Stadium in Pittsburgh while chasing a fly ball. The spectacular catch that resulted was a staple of TV highlight shows for the rest of the year. Ward played in a career-high 123 games during the season, batting .262 with nine home runs and 46 RBI.

Ward began the 1999 season with Pittsburgh, however, he struggled to a .209 batting average with no home runs and eight RBI in 49 games with the Pirates. After Ward finished his rehabilitation from a knee injury in the minor leagues, on August 11, the club released him.

=== Arizona Diamondbacks (1999–2000) ===
On August 18, 1999, Ward signed with the Arizona Diamondbacks, helping the club win the NL West with a .348 batting average with two home runs and seven RBI in 10 games. In the National League Division Series against the New York Mets, his only postseason appearance, Ward played in three games, getting two at-bats, where he had a home run and three RBI. However, Arizona lost the series.

In 2000, Ward hit .173 with no home runs and four RBI with Arizona in 15 games. On October 5, he was released by the Diamondbacks.

=== Philadelphia Phillies (2001) ===
On December 20, 2000, Ward signed with the Philadelphia Phillies, and in the 2001 season, Ward played in 17 games, batting .267 with no home runs and two RBI. On October 8, he was granted free agency and subsequently retired from professional baseball.

Ward played in 12 seasons during his MLB career, appearing in 626 games, and he had a .251 batting average with 39 home runs and 219 RBI. Ward had 389 career hits, and stole 33 bases. Defensively, he recorded a .988 fielding percentage playing at all three outfield positions. He was a member of the 1992 and 1993 World Series champion Toronto Blue Jays, though he did not play in the postseason for Toronto.

== Coaching career ==
=== Pittsburgh Pirates ===
Ward managed the rookie-level Gulf Coast League Pirates in 2006. The next season he managed the Low-A State College Spikes of the New York–Penn League in 2007, leading the club to a 36–39 record.

=== Arizona Diamondbacks ===
In 2008, Ward became the hitting coach of the Mobile BayBears, the Arizona Diamondbacks' Double-A affiliate in the Southern League. He was promoted to manager for the 2011 season. Ward coached the BayBears for two seasons, 2011 and 2012, leading the team to two consecutive league championships. For this accomplishment, Ward was inducted into the Southern League Hall of Fame in 2015.

In 2013, Ward became an assistant hitting coach for the Arizona Diamondbacks. Notably, he was thrown out of the game during a massive brawl between the Diamondbacks and the Dodgers on June 11, 2013. He became full-time hitting coach in 2014, and left the team after the 2015 season.

=== Los Angeles Dodgers ===
Ward became the hitting coach for the Los Angeles Dodgers in 2016.

=== Cincinnati Reds ===
On November 6, 2018, Ward was named the hitting coach of the Cincinnati Reds. After one season in Cincinnati, the Reds announced on October 1, 2019 that Ward would not return the next season.

=== St. Louis Cardinals ===
On November 15, 2021, the St. Louis Cardinals hired Ward as their assistant hitting coach. On November 6, 2022, the Cardinals announced the promotion of Ward to hitting coach. On October 4, 2024, the Cardinals announced Ward would not return.

=== Bristol State Liners ===
The Bristol State Liners of the summer Appalachian League announced Ward as their manager on March 6, 2025. He coached his son, Olin, at Bristol.

=== Greeneville Flyboys ===
Ward is currently serving as the manager of the Greeneville Flyboys of the Appalachian League. This is Ward's second year coaching in the league.

== Personal life ==
Ward attended his first Major League Baseball game on September 10, 1973, alongside his older brother and their father. Ward later stated that watching Hank Aaron hit his 710th home run inspired him to pursue professional baseball.

Ward met his future wife Donna when both were teenagers. They married in 1988. She was diagnosed with breast cancer in 2012, published a book about her cancer-related experiences in 2020, and was in remission as of 2022. They have three children.

In 1999, Ward invested in the Diamond Players Club Clermont golf course.

Ward was inducted into the Mobile Sports Hall of Fame in 2007.

Ward received his B.A. in management from the University of Phoenix in 2015.

Preceded by Don Baylor	Arizona Diamondbacks hitting coach 2013–2015	Succeeded by Dave Magadan
Preceded by Mark McGwire	Los Angeles Dodgers Hitting Coach; 2016–2018	Succeeded by Robert Van Scoyoc
Preceded by Don Long	Cincinnati Reds hitting coach 2019	Succeeded by Alan Zinter
