= Carroll Beringer =

American baseball player and coach

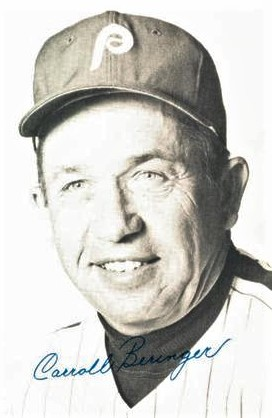
- Coach
- Born: August 14, 1928; Bellwood, Nebraska, U.S.
- Died: January 17, 2011 (aged 82); Fort Worth, Texas, U.S.
- Batted: Right Threw: Right
- Stats at Baseball Reference

Teams
- As coach: Los Angeles Dodgers (1967–1972); Philadelphia Phillies (1973–1978)

Carroll James "C. B." Beringer (August 14, 1928 – January 17, 2011) was an American professional baseball player and coach. The native of Bellwood, Nebraska, was a right-handed pitcher during a 13-season minor league career before finally reaching the Major Leagues as a batting practice pitcher (1961–66) and coach (1967–78). He stood 6 feet (1.8 m) tall and weighed 180 pounds (82 kg).

Beringer first signed with the Brooklyn Dodgers in 1946 and spent more than a quarter century in the Dodger organization. As a pitcher between 1946 and 1960 (with two seasons missed during Korean War military service), Beringer compiled a stellar record of 145–82 (.639), with a career earned run average of 2.98 in 440 games pitched. However, he spent nine seasons at the Double-A level — he was the Texas League Pitcher of the Year in 1959 — and only played one season of Triple-A, in 1960, his final year as an active player.

The following season, he joined the Los Angeles Dodgers as the club's batting practice pitcher, and after six years in that role he became a full-time coach on Walter Alston's staff in 1967. In 1973, when his colleague Danny Ozark was named manager of the Philadelphia Phillies, Beringer accompanied Ozark to the Phils, serving another six years as a Philadelphia coach before leaving Ozark's staff after the 1978 season. During his 18 years as an MLB batting practice pitcher and coach, he was a part of two World Series champions, three National League pennant winners, and three National League East Division champions.

Beringer spent seven full seasons as a pitcher for the Fort Worth Cats, the Dodgers' farm club in the Texas League during the 1950s. He died in Fort Worth at age 82 in 2011.

Preceded by Danny Ozark	Los Angeles Dodgers bench coach 1967–1972	Succeeded by Monty Basgall
Preceded by Doc Edwards	Philadelphia Phillies bullpen coach 1973–1978	Succeeded by Bobby Tiefenauer
