= Bob Schaefer =

American baseball coach and manager (born 1944)

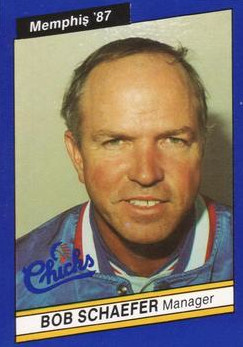
- Schaefer in 1987
- Coach / Manager
- Born: May 22, 1944 (age 82); Putnam, Connecticut, U.S.
- Bats: Left Throws: Right

MLB statistics
- Games managed: 18
- Managerial record: 6–12
- Winning percentage: .333

Teams
- As manager: Kansas City Royals (1991, 2005); As coach: Kansas City Royals (1988–1991, 2002–2005); Oakland Athletics (2007); Los Angeles Dodgers (2008–2010)

Robert Walden Schaefer (born May 22, 1944) is an American baseball executive and coach. He is currently the special assistant to the general manager for the Washington Nationals of Major League Baseball (MLB).

== Playing career ==
Schaefer attended the University of Connecticut, graduating in 1966. He was a member of the UConn College World Series team in 1965, when he was the team captain and the NCAA home run champion.

In 1965, Schaefer played collegiate summer baseball for the Sagamore Clouters of the Cape Cod Baseball League (CCBL), leading Sagamore to the league title under field manager Lou Lamoriello. He returned to manage the CCBL's Bourne Canalmen in 1971 and 1972, and Hyannis Mets in 1978 and 1979, winning league titles in both years with Hyannis. Schaefer was inducted into the CCBL Hall of Fame in 2007.

He was drafted as a shortstop by the St. Louis Cardinals in 1966, but never reached the major leagues in three seasons with the organization. He progressed as far as Modesto in the High A California League. Schaefer batted left-handed and threw right-handed.

In 2005, Schaefer received the Distinguished Alumni Award from UConn, primarily for his achievements on that College World Series team.

== Coaching and managing career ==
Twice, Schaefer has served as the interim pilot of the Kansas City Royals. In 1991, he was interim manager during the period between managers John Wathan and Hal McRae. In 2005, he succeeded Tony Peña on May 11 and served through May 30. On May 31, 2005, Buddy Bell took the reins as permanent manager and Schaefer returned to the bench coach position. Schaefer's position with the Royals was terminated at the end of the 2005 season, the worst in Royals history.

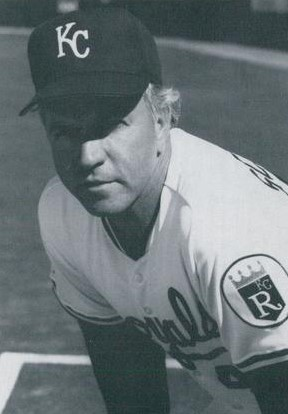
Schaefer with the Kansas City Royals in 1988

He began his managerial career in the minor leagues, where he won numerous awards. He was twice named Manager of the Year (in 1980 and 1981) at Class A Greensboro, then a part of the New York Yankees organization. He also managed the New York Mets' Class AAA team in Tidewater to an International League championship in 1985.

He first joined the Royals organization in 1987, managing the Class AA Memphis Chicks. His first major-league job was as the Royals' first base coach from 1988 to 1990, then he was the Royals' bench coach in 1991. He worked as a special assignment scout with the Royals in 1992.

Schaefer then moved on to the Boston Red Sox organization, serving as a special assignment scout and later the director of player development from 1994 to the midseason of 1998. During that time, he hired Bob Geren as a manager in the Boston farm system; a decade later, when Geren was named the 2007 manager of the Oakland Athletics, he brought Schaefer to Oakland as bench coach on his staff.

Although Schaefer received positive notices for his work as the Red Sox' player development chief, he clashed with general manager Dan Duquette and was fired during the summer of 1998; several minor league managers and coaches, including Geren, departed the organization with Schaefer, who spent the next three years as a special assistant to the general manager of the Baltimore Orioles before returning to the Royals in 2001 as a bench coach and infielders coach.

After his 2005 departure from Kansas City, he spent 2006 as a special assignment scout with the Atlanta Braves. He was bench coach for the Oakland Athletics in 2007, and was named to the same role for the Dodgers and its new manager, Joe Torre, for the 2008 season, a role he held through 2010. After Torre's retirement, Schaefer announced he would not return on the staff of incoming manager Don Mattingly, saying that he thought Mattingly should pick a younger coach who could continue for a number of years.

His career record as an MLB manager is 6–12 (.333), including his 5–12 mark during his 2005 tenure.

== Managerial records ==
| Team | Year | Regular season | | | | Postseason | | | |
| Team | Year | Won | Lost | Win % | Finish | Won | Lost | Win % | Result |
|---|---|---|---|---|---|---|---|---|---|
| KC | 1991 | 1 | 0 | 1.000 | 6th in AL West | – | – | – | – |
| KC | 2005 | 5 | 12 | .294 | 5th in AL Central | – | – | – | – |
| Total | | 18 | 6 | 12 | .333 | | | | |

| Preceded by Dave Jauss | Los Angeles Dodgers Bench Coach; 2008–2010 | Succeeded by Trey Hillman |
