= Ron Roenicke =

American baseball coach (born 1956)

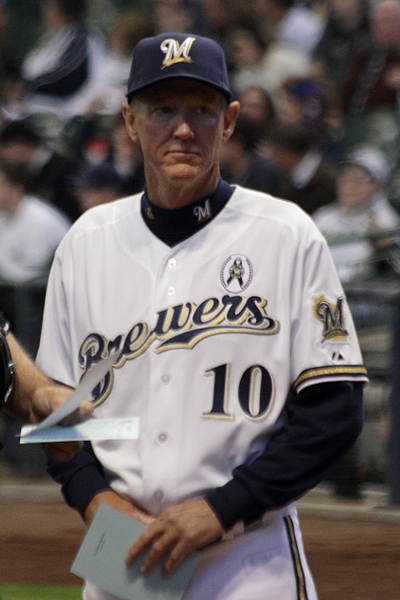
- Roenicke as manager of the Brewers
- Outfielder / Manager
- Born: August 19, 1956 (age 70); Covina, California, U.S.
- Batted: Switch Threw: Left

MLB debut
- September 2, 1981, for the Los Angeles Dodgers

Last MLB appearance
- May 21, 1988, for the Cincinnati Reds

MLB statistics
- Batting average: .238
- Home runs: 17
- Runs batted in: 113
- Managerial record: 366–367
- Winning %: .499
- Stats at Baseball Reference
- Managerial record at Baseball Reference

Teams
- As player: Los Angeles Dodgers (1981–1983); Seattle Mariners (1983); San Diego Padres (1984); San Francisco Giants (1985); Philadelphia Phillies (1986–1987); Cincinnati Reds (1988); As manager: Milwaukee Brewers (2011–2015); Boston Red Sox (2020); As coach: Los Angeles Dodgers (1992–1993); Anaheim Angels / Los Angeles Angels of Anaheim (2000–2010); Los Angeles Dodgers (2015); Los Angeles Angels (2016–2017); Boston Red Sox (2018–2019)

Career highlights and awards
- 2× World Series champion (2002, 2018)

Ronald Jon Roenicke (/ˈrɛnɪkiː/ REN-ih-kee; born August 19, 1956) is an American former professional baseball outfielder, coach, and manager. During his playing career, Roenicke played eight seasons in Major League Baseball (MLB) for the Los Angeles Dodgers, Seattle Mariners, San Diego Padres, San Francisco Giants, Philadelphia Phillies, and Cincinnati Reds. He later served as a coach for the Dodgers, Los Angeles Angels, and Boston Red Sox, and as manager for the Milwaukee Brewers and Red Sox. He is the younger brother of former MLB outfielder Gary Roenicke.

== Early life and playing career ==
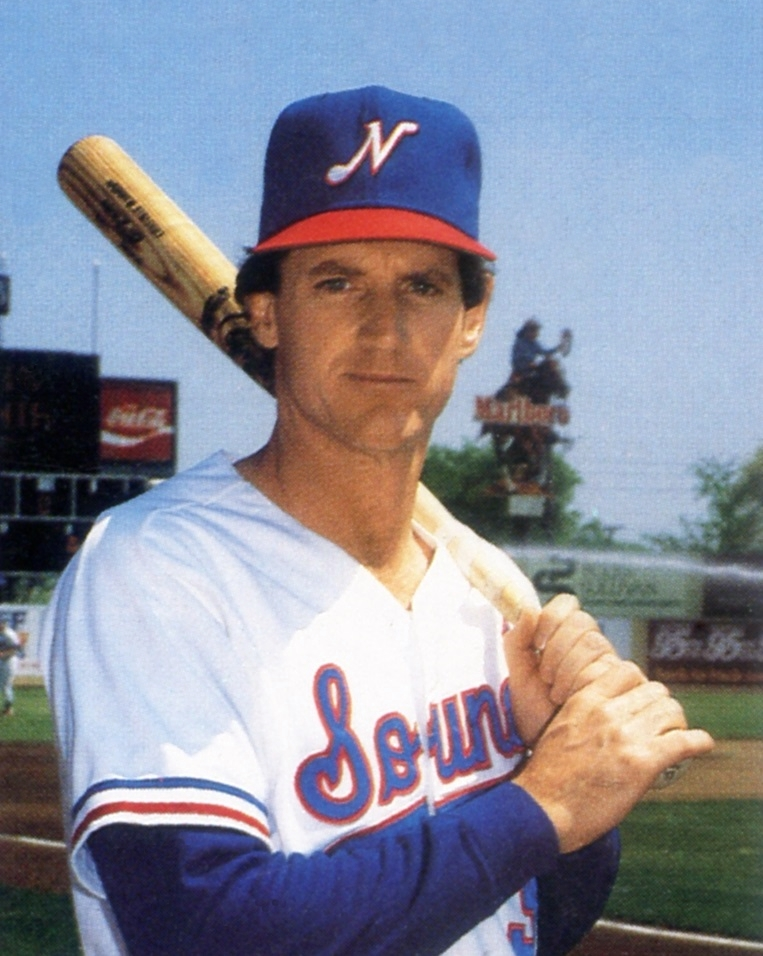
Roenicke with the Nashville Sounds in 1988

Roenicke attended Edgewood High School in West Covina, California, and Mt. San Antonio College in Walnut, California. He was drafted four times (Oakland Athletics in 1974; San Francisco Giants in 1975; Detroit Tigers in 1976; and Atlanta Braves in 1976) but declined to sign each time. He played college baseball at UCLA in 1977 where he hit .284 with 9 home runs and 40 runs batted in (RBI).

In the 1977 Major League Baseball draft, Roenicke was selected by the Los Angeles Dodgers in the 1st round (17th overall), and decided to join the Dodgers organization. He spent time in the Dodgers' farm system until making his major league debut with the club on September 2, 1981, where he remained until released by the club in 1983. He signed with the Seattle Mariners in 1983 and played for the 1984 National League Champion San Diego Padres. He played in two games of the 1984 World Series against the Detroit Tigers, serving as an outfielder and pinch runner.

Roenicke continued to bounce around the major leagues, playing as an outfielder for the San Francisco Giants (1985), Philadelphia Phillies (1986–87), and Cincinnati Reds (1988). In his playing career, he compiled a .238 batting average, with 17 home runs, and 113 RBI.

== Post-playing career ==
=== Coaching career ===
From 1992 to 1993, Roenicke served on the coaching staff of the Dodgers' major league team. He began his managerial career in 1994 with the Rookie-level Great Falls Dodgers, and was named California League Manager of the year as he led the Single-A San Bernardino Spirit to a league title in 1995. He served as the hitting instructor for Triple-A Albuquerque in 1996 before being named Texas League Manager of the Year for guiding the Double-A San Antonio Missions to the Texas League championship in 1997. He managed San Antonio until 1998 when Glenn Hoffman's elevation as the Dodgers' interim manager led to his return to Albuquerque, this time as manager.

In 1999, Roenicke left the Dodgers organization after seven seasons to manage the Triple-A affiliate of the San Francisco Giants, the Fresno Grizzlies. He led them to a 73–69 record, only one game behind the eventual league champion, Los Angeles Angels affiliate Salt Lake.

Roenicke switched allegiances once again in 2000, joining the Angels organization as the third base coach for the major league club. After six seasons in that role, he was promoted to bench coach in 2006 after long-time bench coach Joe Maddon departed to manage the Tampa Bay Devil Rays.

After a brawl between the Angels and the Texas Rangers on August 16, 2006, led to a four-game suspension for Angels skipper Mike Scioscia, Roenicke served as the club's acting manager. He compiled a 4–0 record during his tenure, leading the team to its first four-game sweep of the Seattle Mariners since 1986. He served his one-game suspension immediately afterwards.

=== Brewers manager ===
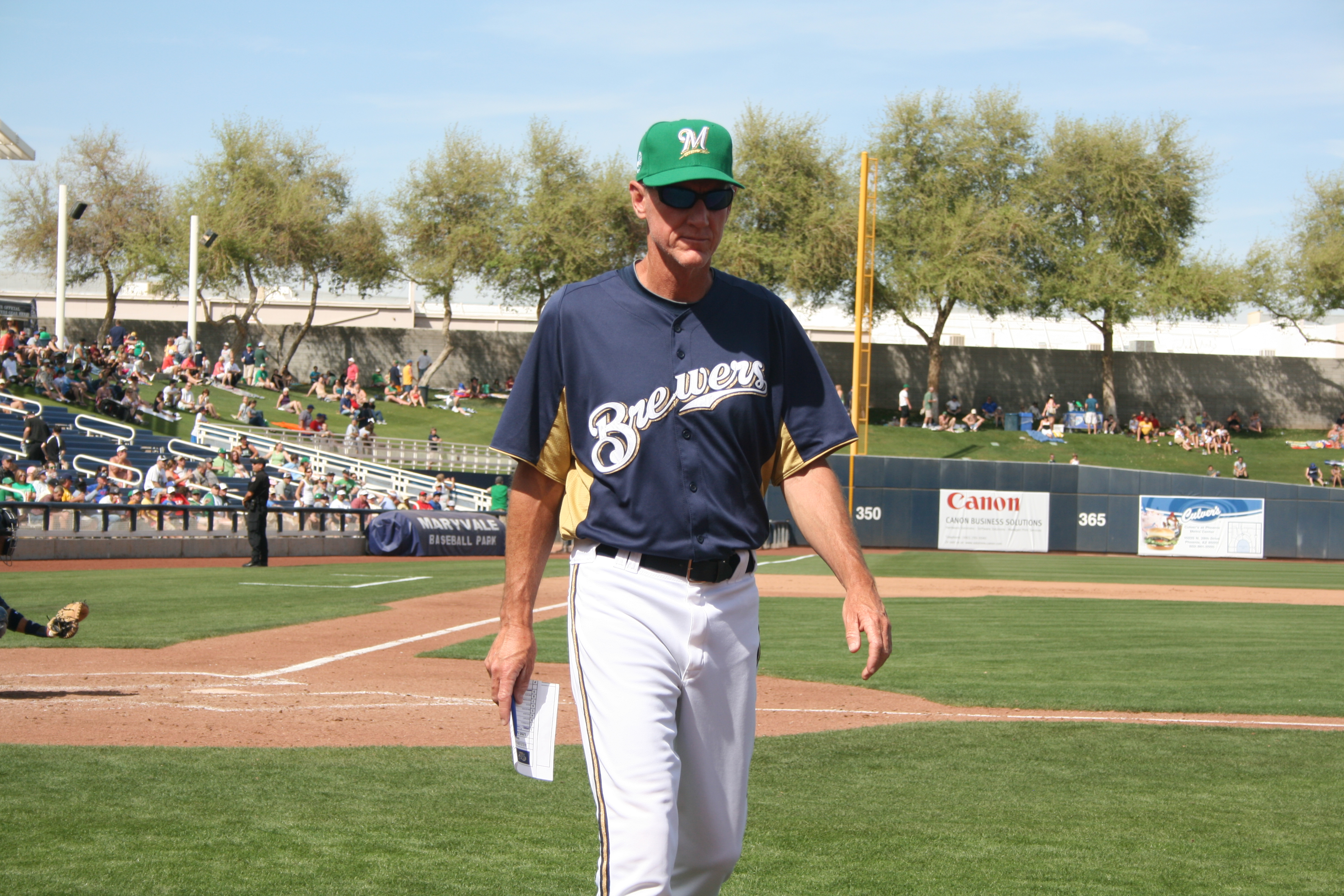
Roenicke with the Brewers in 2011

Roenicke was interviewed by the Milwaukee Brewers for their managerial opening in October 2010. He was a finalist along with Bob Melvin, Bobby Valentine, and Joey Cora. He was hired as Brewers manager on November 2, 2010.

Roenicke's first season as the Brewers manager was a resounding success as the Brewers finished the season 96–66, at the time the most wins in franchise history, and also won the National League Central Division title, the first divisional title for the team in 29 years and their first as a National League team. The Brewers went on to win the NLDS against the Arizona Diamondbacks but lost the NLCS to the St. Louis Cardinals. Roenicke became the fourth manager in Brewers history to have a winning season in his first full season as manager, joining George Bamberger, Tom Trebelhorn, and Phil Garner.

Roenicke was also only the fourth Brewers manager to make the playoffs and the first to do so while managing the team for a full season: Harvey Kuenn and Dale Sveum each took over for a fired manager during their playoff seasons, and Buck Rodgers managed the team during a season shortened by a players' strike. The Brewers' success in 2011 resulted in Roenicke finishing in second in NL Manager of the Year voting, which went to Kirk Gibson of the Diamondbacks.

Roenicke and the Brewers looked to try to capitalize on their success in 2012, but inconsistent play from several players caused the Brewers to scuffle for most of the season. However, the team was able to rebound and finish the season 83–79, the first time since 2008 that the Brewers had finished with back-to-back winning seasons. In 2014, the Brewers led the NL Central for much of the season, but collapsed in late August and September, resulting in an 82-80 record and failure to make the postseason. On May 3, 2015, Roenicke was fired after a poor 7–18 start to the season. He finished with a record of 342 wins and 331 losses in 673 games as Brewers manager. He also had five wins and six losses in 11 post–season games.

=== Return to coaching ===
On August 17, 2015, with seven weeks left in the season, Roenicke was hired by the Los Angeles Dodgers to be their third base coach. In November 2015, he joined the Los Angeles Angels as their third base coach; he was with the team for the 2016 and 2017 seasons. On November 2, 2017, he was announced as the bench coach for the Boston Red Sox, serving under rookie manager Alex Cora.

=== Red Sox manager ===
Following the mutual decision of the Red Sox and Alex Cora to part ways in January 2020, in the wake of the Houston Astros sign stealing scandal, Roenicke was named interim manager of the Red Sox on February 11, 2020. The "interim" tag was removed in April, following MLB's investigation about sign-stealing by the 2018 Red Sox. During the start-delayed 60-game season, the 2020 Red Sox finished last in the American League East with a record of 24–36, a .400 winning percentage, the lowest for the franchise since the 1965 Red Sox finished with a .383 winning percentage (62–100). On September 27, 2020, prior to the team's final regular season game, the Red Sox announced that Roenicke would not return as manager for the 2021 season. He was replaced by Cora, the manager he had replaced a year earlier.

=== Front office role with Dodgers ===
In February 2021, the Los Angeles Dodgers hired Roenicke as a special assistant to the general manager.

=== Managerial record ===
As of September 27, 2020

Team	Year	Regular season					Postseason			
Team	Year	Games	Won	Lost	Win %	Finish	Won	Lost	Win %	Result
MIL	2011	162	96	66	.593	1st in NL Central	5	6	.455	Lost NLCS (STL)
MIL	2012	162	83	79	.512	3rd in NL Central	–	–	–	–
MIL	2013	162	74	88	.457	4th in NL Central	–	–	–	–
MIL	2014	162	82	80	.506	3rd in NL Central	–	–	–	–
MIL	2015	25	7	18	.280	fired	–	–	–	–
MIL total		673	342	331	.508		5	6	.455	
BOS	2020	60	24	36	.400	5th in AL East	–	–	–	–
BOS total		60	24	36	.400		0	0	–	
Total		733	366	367	.499		5	6	.455	

== Personal life ==
Roenicke's nephew, Josh (his brother Gary's son), has also played in the major leagues while his son, Lance, has played and coached in the minor leagues. Roenicke's wife, Karen, was a physical education teacher at Chino Hills High School in California. Roenicke is a Christian.

Sporting positions
Preceded by Bill Russell	Los Angeles Dodgers bench coach 1992–1993	Succeeded by Bill Russell
Preceded by Larry Bowa; Gary DiSarcina	Anaheim/Los Angeles Angels third base coach 2000–2006; 2016–2017	Succeeded by Dino Ebel; Dino Ebel
Preceded by Joe Maddon	Los Angeles Angels bench coach 2006–2010	Succeeded by Rob Picciolo
Preceded by Lorenzo Bundy	Los Angeles Dodgers third base coach 2015	Succeeded by Chris Woodward
Preceded by Gary DiSarcina	Boston Red Sox bench coach 2018–2019	Succeeded by Jerry Narron
