= Monty Basgall =

American baseball player (1922–2005)

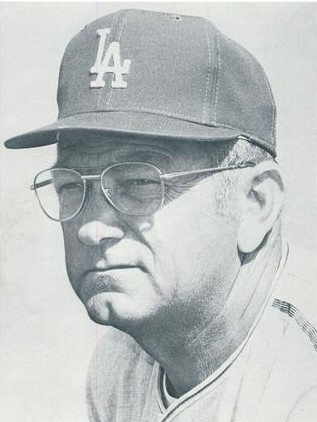
- Second baseman
- Born: February 8, 1922; Pfeifer, Kansas, U.S.
- Died: September 22, 2005 (aged 83); Sierra Vista, Arizona, U.S.
- Batted: Right Threw: Right

MLB debut
- April 19, 1948, for the Pittsburgh Pirates

Last MLB appearance
- August 11, 1951, for the Pittsburgh Pirates

MLB statistics
- Batting average: .215
- Home runs: 4
- Runs scored: 41
- Stats at Baseball Reference

Teams
- As player: Pittsburgh Pirates (1948–1949, 1951); As coach: Los Angeles Dodgers (1973–1986)

Career highlights and awards
- World Series champion (1981)

Romanus "Monty" Basgall (February 8, 1922 – September 22, 2005) was an American professional baseball player, manager, coach and scout. A former second baseman who appeared in 200 Major League Baseball games for the Pittsburgh Pirates (1948–49; 1951), Basgall became a longtime member of the Los Angeles Dodgers' organization who served as the bench and infield coach for Hall of Fame managers Walter Alston and Tommy Lasorda for 14 seasons (1973–86). During that time, he worked with four National League pennant winners (1974, 1977, 1978 and 1981), as well as the 1981 World Series-champion Dodgers. Basgall was born in Pfeifer, Kansas, graduated from high school there, and attended Sterling College.

== Playing career ==
Basgall stood 5 feet 10 inches (1.78 m) tall, weighed 175 pounds (79 kg) and threw and batted right-handed. He signed with the Brooklyn Dodgers in 1942, the first year of the United States' involvement in World War II. After one season in the minors, he served in the Army for three years before resuming his baseball career in 1946 with the Double-A Fort Worth Cats of the Texas League.

In December 1947, the Dodgers traded Basgall to the Pirates, where he played one full season (1949) and parts of two others (1948 and 1951). In 1949, he was the Pirates' starting second baseman for 98 of the club's 154 games. But Basgall's MLB playing career was hampered by poor offensive production; he batted only .216, .218 and .209 in his three years in the majors, with 110 total hits, which included 15 doubles, three triples and four home runs. He was credited with 41 runs batted in.

Pittsburgh sent him to the Hollywood Stars of the top-level Pacific Coast League in 1952, and he spent four years in the PCL before starting his managing and coaching career.

== Manager, coach and scout ==
After managing farm teams in the Pirates' organization from 1956 to 1958, he returned to the Dodgers as a scout and minor league infield instructor in 1959, serving a dozen years in that role before becoming the Dodgers' Double-A manager in 1971. During that time, he helped convert former catcher Ted Sizemore and former outfielders Bill Russell and Davey Lopes to middle infielders. The three would play a combined 46 years in Major League Baseball; Russell (three times) and Lopes (four) were multiple members of the National League All-Star team, and Sizemore was the 1969 National League Rookie of the Year. Russell and Lopes would form the up-the-middle core of the Dodger infield of Garvey, Lopes, Russell and Cey.

At the close of the 1972 season, Basgall and Lasorda were promoted to manager Alston's big-league coaching staff, with Lasorda working as third-base coach and Basgall as infield and bench coach. Basgall remained on the Los Angeles staff for another decade after Lasorda's promotion to manager late in 1976. He retired in 1987, and lived in Sierra Vista, Arizona, until his death in 2005 at the age of 83.

Preceded by Carroll Beringer	Los Angeles Dodgers Bench Coach; 1973–1986	Succeeded by Bill Russell
