= Robert Van Scoyoc =

American baseball player and coach (born 1986)

Los Angeles Dodgers – No. 72
- Coach
- Born: November 16, 1986 (age 39); Valencia, California, U.S.

Teams
- As coach: Los Angeles Dodgers (2019–present)

Career highlights and awards
- 3× World Series champion (2020, 2024, 2025)

Robert Van Scoyoc (born November 16, 1986) is an American professional baseball hitting coach for the Los Angeles Dodgers of Major League Baseball (MLB).

== Career ==
Van Scoyoc attended William S. Hart High School in Newhall, Santa Clarita, California, graduating in 2005. and played college baseball at Cuesta College, describing his play as "pretty mediocre".

Van Scoyoc began his coaching career in 2008, working with youth hitters in the Santa Clarita Valley and as a part-time assistant coach for Valencia High School. From 2010 to 2011 he was the hitting coach and recruitment coordinator for San Diego Christian College. After that he teamed with Craig Wallenbrock to mentor numerous college and professional hitters. They worked with J. D. Martinez in 2013, helping him to improve his swing. He was a hitting consultant for the Los Angeles Dodgers from 2016 to 2017, and he helped Chris Taylor improve his results with changes to his swing. The Arizona Diamondbacks hired him before the 2018 season as a hitting strategist before he returned to the Dodgers as their major league hitting coach for the 2019 season.

Preceded by Turner Ward	Los Angeles Dodgers hitting coach 2019–present	Succeeded by Incumbent
