= Dodger infield of Garvey, Lopes, Cey and Russell =

Players of the L.A. Dodgers infield in the 1970s

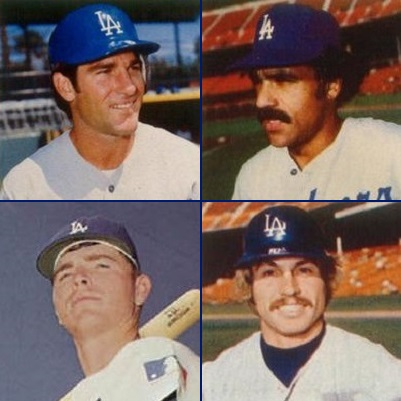
Clockwise from top left: Garvey, Lopes, Cey, and Russell

From 1973 to 1981, the Los Angeles Dodgers played a majority of their games with a starting infield consisting of four players: Steve Garvey at first base, Davey Lopes at second, Ron Cey at third, and Bill Russell at shortstop. Beginning on June 23, 1973, and lasting until Game 6 of the 1981 World Series, the quartet set a record in Major League Baseball for the length of time the same four players were designated as starters at those positions—eight-and-a-half years.

== Background ==
On June 13, 1973, the quartet of players, Steve Garvey, Davey Lopes, Ron Cey, and Bill Russell, played together for the first time as an infield, Garvey having entered the game as a substitute in the fourth inning. On June 23, against the Cincinnati Reds at Dodger Stadium, they were the starting infield, and remained as such for a majority of Dodger games through the rest of the 1973 season, plus eight more seasons. This longevity gave the quartet a record in Major League Baseball for the same four players designated as starters (Note: While the noted four player were "designated as starters" by the Dodgers, this was not a consecutive games streak for the players individually or as a group—for example, Russell only started half of the team's games during the 1975 season. The quartet started a total of 810 regular-season games together, approximately 60% of Dodger games during the noted timespan.) for the four infield positions. The identification of the best infield in the history of major league baseball is a perennial topic of discussion. Most discussions focus on particular individual seasons, but the 1970s-era Dodgers players were the greatest as measured by their establishment of an objectively-measured accomplishment: the length of time they played together.

The head scout for the Dodgers, Al Campanis, is credited with bringing the players to the team. The group was put together by manager Walter Alston and third-base coach Tommy Lasorda and had been nurtured by coach Monty Basgall. Garvey was the first baseman, Lopes played second base, while Russell played shortstop and Cey was at third base. Three of the players came to the Dodgers playing at different positions than the ones where they ended up. Initially, Russell and Lopes were both outfielders, while Garvey was a third baseman. On Opening Day of the 1973 Dodgers season, Russell was the only one of the four to start.

With the Dodgers, the four players captured four National League pennants (1974, 1977, 1978 and 1981) and one World Series championship (1981). The infield recorded a total of 21 All-Star Game appearances during their eight-plus year run: Garvey eight times (1974–81), Cey six times (1974–79), Lopes four times (1978–81) and Russell three times (1973, 1976, 1980). The four never appeared in the All-Star game in the same season, but three of the four appeared in 1978, 1979 and 1980, the latter of which was held at Dodger Stadium and saw Russell, Lopes and Garvey all start the game. Garvey was a four-time Gold Glove recipient, and Lopes received it once.

The last game the four players played together was the Dodgers' victory over the New York Yankees in Game 6 of the 1981 World Series at Yankee Stadium. The longevity of the group is attributed to each of the players playing at their peak, the winning record of the Dodgers, and the similarity in temperament and age of each of the men. According to writer Gary Kelin, "free agency and the sport's evolving financial structure make it improbable that any group will equal its longevity." They are still known among Dodger fans as "The Infield", while W. R. Bill Schroeder, writing in the Baseball Research Journal in 1980, described them as the "Durable Dodger Infield".

== Aftermath ==
Lopes was the first to depart, traded by the Dodgers to the Oakland Athletics before the 1982 season, which gave rookie Steve Sax the chance to start at second base. The following offseason, Cey was traded to the Chicago Cubs, and Garvey left in free agency for the San Diego Padres on a contract of $6.6 million over five years. Garvey set a record for most consecutive games played by a National League player at 1,118 games in his first game back at Dodger Stadium in April. His streak, which had begun in September 1975, eventually stretched to 1,207 games (third-longest in MLB history at the time) before he broke his thumb in July of that year. Lopes was traded by the A's during the 1984 season, joining Cey on the National League East champion Cubs; they faced Garvey's National League West champion Padres in the 1984 NLCS. The Padres erased a two games to none deficit, with the help of a Garvey walk-off home run in Game 4, to win the series in five games and advance to the World Series.

All three ended their careers in 1987. Garvey spent the rest of his career with the Padres, which included two further all-star appearances in 1984 and 1985, before an injury cut his final season short in May of 1987. Cey spent four seasons with the Cubs before being traded to the Athletics, where he spent part of the 1987 season as a reserve before being released in July. Lopes was traded to the Houston Astros midway through the 1986 season; he spent much of his Cubs and Astros tenure as a reserve player before retiring after the 1987 season.

Russell's remained with the Dodgers until his retirement in 1986, having played all 17 years with the team, with his games played being second-most in franchise history and the most since the franchise moved to Los Angeles. He joined the team as a coach in 1994 before being hired to manage them in 1996, where he led them to one playoff appearance in three years.
