= Danny Lehmann =

American baseball player and coach (born 1985)

Los Angeles Dodgers – No. 0
- Coach
- Born: September 5, 1985 (age 40); Denver, Colorado, U.S.
- Bats: Right Throws: Right

Teams
- Los Angeles Dodgers (2018, 2020–present)

Career highlights and awards
- 3× World Series champion (2020, 2024, 2025)

Daniel Joseph Lehmann (born September 5, 1985) is an American professional baseball coach and former minor league baseball catcher. He is the bench coach for the Los Angeles Dodgers of Major League Baseball (MLB).

== Career ==
Lehmann was drafted by the Minnesota Twins in the 8th round of the 2007 MLB draft out of Rice University and played in their farm system until 2013. He spent the final year of his playing career with the Sugar Land Skeeters of the independent Atlantic League.

After his playing career ended, he joined the Los Angeles Dodgers in 2015 as their Advance Video Scout and stayed in that role for three years. In 2018, the Dodgers promoted him to Game Planning and Communications coach. He served as a Dodgers' special assistant in 2019. Lehmann resumed his Game Planning and Communications coaching position in 2020. In 2023, he was promoted to bench coach.

Sporting positions
Preceded by Bob Geren	Los Angeles Dodgers Bench Coach; 2023–present	Succeeded by Incumbent
