= Reggie Smith =

American baseball player (born 1945)

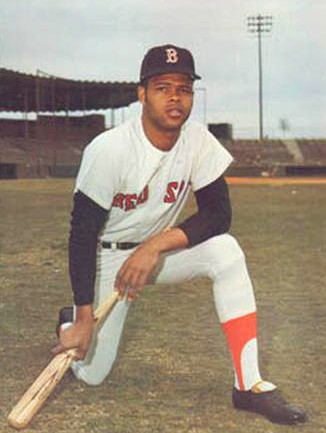
- Smith with the Boston Red Sox in 1969
- Outfielder
- Born: April 2, 1945 (age 81); Shreveport, Louisiana, U.S.
- Batted: Switch Threw: Right

Professional debut
- MLB: September 18, 1966, for the Boston Red Sox
- NPB: 1983, for the Yomiuri Giants

Last appearance
- MLB: October 3, 1982, for the San Francisco Giants
- NPB: 1984, for the Yomiuri Giants

MLB statistics
- Batting average: .287
- Hits: 2,020
- Home runs: 314
- Runs batted in: 1,092

NPB statistics
- Batting average: .271
- Home runs: 45
- Runs batted in: 122
- Stats at Baseball Reference

Teams
- As player: Boston Red Sox (1966–1973); St. Louis Cardinals (1974–1976); Los Angeles Dodgers (1976–1981); San Francisco Giants (1982); Yomiuri Giants (1983–1984); As coach: Los Angeles Dodgers (1994–1999)

Career highlights and awards
- 7× All-Star (1969, 1972, 1974, 1975, 1977, 1978, 1980); World Series champion (1981); Gold Glove Award (1968); Boston Red Sox Hall of Fame; Legend of Dodger Baseball

Carl Reginald Smith (born April 2, 1945) is an American former professional baseball player. He played in Major League Baseball (MLB) as an outfielder and afterwards served as a coach and front office executive. He also played in the Nippon Professional Baseball (NPB) for two seasons at the end of his playing career. During a seventeen-year MLB career (1966–1982), Smith appeared in 1,987 games, hit 314 home runs with 1,092 RBI and batted .287. He was a switch-hitter who threw right-handed. In his prime, he had one of the strongest throwing arms of any outfielder in the MLB. Smith played at least seventy games in thirteen different seasons, and in every one of those thirteen seasons, his team had a winning record.

== Playing career ==
1976 photo of Smith for Los Angeles Dodgers

Smith grew up in Los Angeles, California, and attended Centennial High School in Compton, California. He won the International League batting title in 1966 with a .320 average while playing for the Toronto Maple Leafs. He was called up to the MLB late in that season and played for the Boston Red Sox (1966–73), St. Louis Cardinals (1974–76), Los Angeles Dodgers (1976–81) and San Francisco Giants (1982). He appeared in four World Series, including during his rookie 1967 season for the Red Sox, and three (1977, 1978 and 1981) for the Dodgers. He hit three home runs in the 1977 series.

Smith was traded along with Ken Tatum from the Red Sox to the St. Louis Cardinals for Bernie Carbo and Rick Wise on October 26, 1973. He later called Boston a racist city, and was censured for his comments by Boston mayor Kevin White. On June 15, 1976, Smith was traded to the Los Angeles Dodgers for Bob Detherage, Joe Ferguson, and Freddie Tisdale.

In the 1978 season, Dodger pitcher Don Sutton went public with comments that Smith was a more valuable player to the Dodgers than the more-celebrated Steve Garvey. This led to an infamous clubhouse wrestling match between Sutton and Garvey. Tommy John, who also played with Smith in Los Angeles, thought that Smith was a great leader. "He was a Don Baylor type, an outspoken enforcer, a guy who played his fanny off for us."

In the 1981 season as a member of the Dodgers, Smith was taunted by Giants fan Michael Dooley, who then threw a batting helmet at him. Smith then jumped into the stands at Candlestick Park and started punching him. He was ejected from the game, and Dooley was arrested. Five months later, Smith joined the Giants as a free agent.

After one season in San Francisco, Smith then moved to NPB with the Yomiuri Giants, at a salary of close to a million dollars and the use of three automobiles. Smith was a productive power-hitter for the Giants for two seasons, but often bristled against the codified traditions of the Yomiuri organization in particular and baseball in Japan in general.

== Career statistics ==
In 1,987 games over 17 Major League seasons, Smith posted a .287 batting average (2020-for-7033) with 2,020 hits, 1,123 runs, 363 doubles, 57 triples, 314 home runs, 1,092 RBI, 137 stolen bases, 890 base on balls, 1,030 strikeouts, a .366 on-base percentage, and a .489 slugging percentage. He recorded a career .978 fielding percentage. In four World Series and four playoff series covering 32 games, he hit .234 (25-for-107) with 17 runs, 6 home runs, and 17 RBI.

== Coaching career ==
After his playing career ended, Smith rejoined the Dodgers, where he served as a coach under Tommy Lasorda, a minor league instructor, and a player development official.

Smith became involved with USA Baseball in 1999 as hitting coach on the 1999 Professional Team at the Pan American Games in Winnipeg, Manitoba (Silver, Olympic qualifiers). Smith again served as USA hitting coach in the 2000 Olympic Games in Sydney, Australia where the US Team took home gold. He also served as hitting coach for the 2007 IBAF Baseball World Cup in Taiwan (gold). Smith also served as hitting coach for Team USA during the 2006 World Baseball Classic, and served as hitting coach for the bronze medal-winning USA Baseball Olympic team at the 2008 Summer Olympics in Beijing.

Smith runs a baseball academy in Encino, California, where he trains youth players, including Max Fried and Austin Wilson.

Smith helped coach the National League All-Stars team in 2021 as part of Dave Roberts' staff.

== Personal life ==
Smith has a pilot's license and can play seven different musical instruments.

== See also ==
- List of Major League Baseball annual doubles leaders
- List of Major League Baseball career hits leaders
- List of Major League Baseball career home run leaders
- List of Major League Baseball career runs batted in leaders
- List of Major League Baseball career runs scored leaders
- List of Major League Baseball career WAR leaders
- Boston Red Sox award winners and league leaders
- Los Angeles Dodgers award winners and league leaders
  - St. Louis Cardinals award winners and league leaders
  - Team records

| Preceded by Ben Hines | Los Angeles Dodgers Hitting Coach; 1994–1998 | Succeeded by Rick Down |
