= Jim Tracy (baseball) =

American baseball player and manager (born 1955)

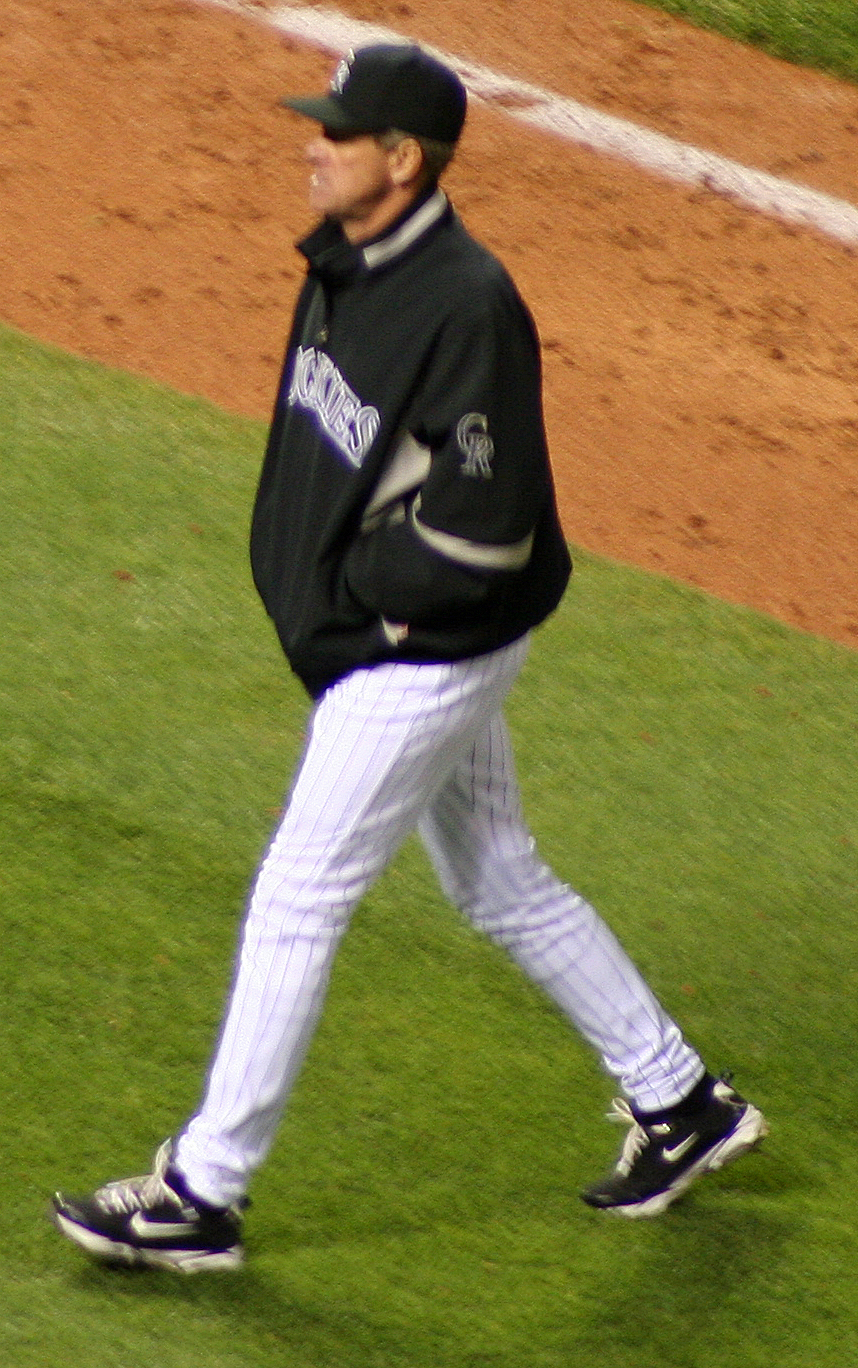
- Tracy with the Colorado Rockies in 2010
- Outfielder / Manager
- Born: December 31, 1955 (age 70); Hamilton, Ohio, U.S.
- Batted: Left Threw: Right

Professional debut
- MLB: July 20, 1980, for the Chicago Cubs
- NPB: April 9, 1983, for the Yokohama Taiyo Whales

Last appearance
- MLB: September 30, 1981, for the Chicago Cubs
- NPB: April 8, 1984, for the Yokohama Taiyo Whales

MLB statistics
- Batting average: .249
- Home runs: 3
- Runs batted in: 14
- Managerial record: 856–880
- Winning %: .493

NPB statistics
- Batting average: .301
- Home runs: 20
- Runs batted in: 68
- Stats at Baseball Reference
- Managerial record at Baseball Reference

Teams
- As player: Chicago Cubs (1980–1981); Yokohama Taiyo Whales (1983–1984); As manager: Los Angeles Dodgers (2001–2005); Pittsburgh Pirates (2006–2007); Colorado Rockies (2009–2012); As coach: Montreal Expos (1994–1998); Los Angeles Dodgers (1999–2000); Colorado Rockies (2009)

Career highlights and awards
- NL Manager of the Year (2009)

James Edwin Tracy (born December 31, 1955) is an American former Major League Baseball (MLB) manager and player. He played for the Chicago Cubs in 1980 and 1981, and has managed the Los Angeles Dodgers, Pittsburgh Pirates, and Colorado Rockies. Tracy was named Manager of the Year in 2009, only the second manager to win the award after being hired mid-season, joining Jack McKeon for the Florida Marlins.

== Playing career ==
Tracy was an All-America baseball player at Marietta College, an NCAA Division III institution in Ohio. In 1976, he played collegiate summer baseball with the Chatham A's of the Cape Cod Baseball League and was named a league all-star.

He played as an outfielder for parts of two seasons with the Chicago Cubs in 1980–81. He also played two seasons in Japan with the Yokohama Taiyo Whales in 1983–84.

== Managing career ==
Tracy worked as a minor league manager for several organizations including the Ottawa Lynx in 1994. He is featured as the manager of the 1988 Peoria Chiefs in the book "The Boys Who Would Be Cubs", by Joseph Bosco . Tracy later served as the bench coach of the Montreal Expos (under manager Felipe Alou), and the Dodgers (under manager Davey Johnson) in 1999 and 2000.

=== Los Angeles Dodgers ===
Tracy was manager of the Los Angeles Dodgers from 2001 to 2005, compiling four winning seasons and a 427–383 record. With Tracy as manager, the Dodgers won the National League West division in 2004 but lost 3-1 to the St. Louis Cardinals in the National League Division Series. On October 3, 2005, after finishing the season at 71-91, Tracy and the Dodgers agreed to part ways citing "philosophical differences."

=== Pittsburgh Pirates ===
Tracy was hired by the Pittsburgh Pirates on October 11, 2005. In two disappointing seasons in Pittsburgh, he compiled a 135–189 record. Tracy was fired by the Pirates on October 5, 2007.

=== Colorado Rockies ===
Tracy was hired as bench coach for the Colorado Rockies in November 2008. On May 29, 2009, Clint Hurdle was fired with an 18–28 record, and Tracy was named to replace him. Tracy led the Rockies to the postseason, with a 74–42 (.638) record after taking over as manager, but lost the NLDS to the Philadelphia Phillies by a score of 3 games to 1. For his efforts in the 2009 season, Tracy won the National League Manager of the Year Award as voted on by the Baseball Writers' Association of America. He was also named the NL Manager of the Year by The Sporting News. On November 19, 2009, Tracy was rewarded with a three-year contract extension.

In 2010, the Rockies lost 13 of their last 14 games, collapsing from a 1/2 game deficit in the wild card race to finish 8 games behind an Atlanta Braves team that went 6-8 in the same span. In 2011, the Rockies began the season with an 11-2 record before finishing the season with a 62-87 (.416) run that landed them in 4th place.

After the 2011 season, the Rockies rewarded Tracy with an "indefinite" contract extension. The Rockies went on to accumulate a 37-65 record (.363) through August 1, leading to a front office reshuffle that left Jim Tracy and his staff intact. Tracy resigned as manager of the Rockies on October 7, 2012, following a disappointing and injury plagued 2012 season that saw the Rockies finish 64-98, the 2nd worst record in franchise history.

== Managerial record ==
| Team | Year | Regular season | | | | | Postseason | | | |
| Team | Year | Games | Won | Lost | Win % | Finish | Won | Lost | Win % | Result |
|---|---|---|---|---|---|---|---|---|---|---|
| LAD | 2001 | 162 | 86 | 76 | .531 | 3rd in NL West | – | – | – | – |
| LAD | 2002 | 162 | 92 | 70 | .568 | 3rd in NL West | – | – | – | – |
| LAD | 2003 | 162 | 85 | 77 | .525 | 2nd in NL West | – | – | – | – |
| LAD | 2004 | 162 | 93 | 69 | .574 | 1st in NL West | 1 | 3 | .250 | Lost NLDS (STL) |
| LAD | 2005 | 162 | 71 | 91 | .438 | 4th in NL West | – | – | – | – |
| LAD total | | 810 | 427 | 383 | .527 | | 1 | 3 | .250 | |
| PIT | 2006 | 162 | 67 | 95 | .414 | 5th in NL Central | – | – | – | – |
| PIT | 2007 | 162 | 68 | 94 | .420 | 6th in NL Central | – | – | – | – |
| PIT total | | 324 | 135 | 189 | .417 | | – | – | – | – |
| COL | 2009 | 116 | 74 | 42 | .638 | 2nd in NL West | 1 | 3 | .250 | Lost NLDS (PHI) |
| COL | 2010 | 162 | 83 | 79 | .512 | 3rd in NL West | – | – | – | – |
| COL | 2011 | 162 | 73 | 89 | .451 | 4th in NL West | – | – | – | – |
| COL | 2012 | 162 | 64 | 98 | .395 | 5th in NL West | – | – | – | – |
| COL total | | 602 | 294 | 308 | .488 | | 1 | 3 | .250 | |
| Total | | 1,736 | 856 | 880 | .493 | | 2 | 6 | .250 | |

== Personal life ==
In 2003, Tracy was in the audience during a taping of The Price Is Right and was introduced to the crowd by host Bob Barker.

Tracy's oldest son, Brian, played baseball at UC Santa Barbara, and was drafted in 2007 by the Pirates. Brian later became a scout for the Pirates. Middle son Chad played in the minor leagues for eight seasons, including four seasons in Triple-A for three different franchises, and went on to manage in the minor leagues. In April 2026, Chad was announced as the interim manager of the Boston Red Sox. Youngest son Mark also played minor league baseball from 2010 to 2013.

Sporting positions
| Preceded by Pete Mackanin | Peoria Chiefs Manager; 1987–1988 | Succeeded by Brad Mills |
| Preceded by Tom Runnells | Chattanooga Lookouts Manager; 1989–1991 | Succeeded by Dave Miley |
| Preceded by Mike Quade | Harrisburg Senators Manager; 1993 | Succeeded by Dave Jauss |
| Preceded by Mike Quade | Ottawa Lynx Manager; 1993 | Succeeded by Pete Mackanin |
| Preceded by Mike Scioscia | Los Angeles Dodgers Bench Coach; 1999–2000 | Succeeded by Jim Riggleman |
| Preceded by Jamie Quirk | Colorado Rockies Bench Coach; 2009 | Succeeded by Tom Runnells |
