= Bill Russell (shortstop) =

American baseball player and manager (born 1948)

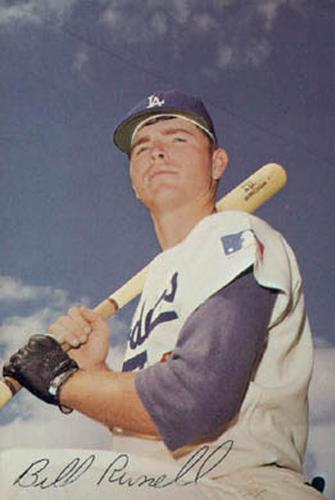
- Shortstop / Manager
- Born: October 21, 1948 (age 77); Pittsburg, Kansas, U.S.
- Batted: Right Threw: Right

MLB debut
- April 7, 1969, for the Los Angeles Dodgers

Last MLB appearance
- October 1, 1986, for the Los Angeles Dodgers

MLB statistics
- Batting average: .263
- Home runs: 46
- Runs batted in: 627
- Managerial record: 173–149
- Winning %: .537
- Stats at Baseball Reference

Teams
- As player: Los Angeles Dodgers (1969–1986); As manager: Los Angeles Dodgers (1996–1998); As coach: Los Angeles Dodgers (1987–1991, 1994–1996); Tampa Bay Devil Rays (2000)

Career highlights and awards
- 3× All-Star (1973, 1976, 1980); 2× World Series champion (1981, 1988)

William Ellis Russell (born October 21, 1948) is an American former shortstop, coach and manager in Major League Baseball. Russell played his entire 18-year, 2,181-game career with the Los Angeles Dodgers as the starting shortstop for four National League pennant winners and one World Series championship team. He also served as the team's manager from 1996 to 1998.

== Playing career ==
A right-handed batter and thrower, Russell was selected in the ninth round of the 1966 MLB draft out of Pittsburg (Kansas) High School and debuted with the Dodgers in 1969 as a 20-year-old outfielder. His first two MLB seasons were spent in the outfield as veteran Maury Wills was the Dodgers shortstop. In 1971, Russell split time between the infield, mostly at second base, and the outfield (primarily right field). During the 1972 season, with Wills mired in a slump, Russell got the start at shortstop on April 29 and held onto the position for the next eleven years. He anchored an infield that included third baseman Ron Cey, second baseman Davey Lopes and first baseman Steve Garvey for eight and one half years. Russell batted .263 over his regular season career, and – coincidentally – posted the same average in 23 World Series games in 1974, 1977, 1978, and 1981. Russell's finest Fall Classic was in 1978, when he garnered 11 hits and batted .423 in a losing effort against the New York Yankees. He also hit .337 over five National League Championship Series. Russell wore number 18.

Russell was hit in the hand with a pitch in September 1980 by Mike LaCoss of the Cincinnati Reds, shattering his right forefinger. He had the finger surgically repaired and continued his career until retiring after the 1986 season. Only Zack Wheat played more games as a Dodger and no one in the West Coast portion of Dodgers history has played more games. He played shortstop exclusively from 1974–1983 and alternated playing time at second base, shortstop and the outfield for his final three seasons. Tommy John, who pitched in the major leagues for 26 years, called Russell "the best shortstop that ever played behind me."

== Coaching career ==
Russell became a coach on manager Tommy Lasorda's staff in 1987. In 1992–93, he piloted the Dodgers' Triple-A farm club, the Albuquerque Dukes of the Pacific Coast League, but posted losing records each season. He then rejoined Lasorda and the Los Angeles coaching staff in 1994 and was considered by general manager Fred Claire and team owner Peter O'Malley to be the heir apparent to Lasorda's job. On June 24, 1996, the 68-year-old skipper suffered a mild heart attack and Russell became acting manager on June 25. Although Lasorda's health recovered, the Dodger front office decided to make Russell's appointment permanent on July 29 when Lasorda formally announced his retirement, thus making him only the third man to manage the Dodgers in 43 years. Russell finished the 1996 season, compiling a record of 49–37 and bringing the Dodgers home in second place, earning the NL wild card spot in the playoffs before being swept in three games by the Atlanta Braves in the Division Series. The following year, he directed the Dodgers to an 88-74 mark and another runner-up finish in the NL West. However, when the 1998 club stumbled to a 36–38 start – and with the News Corporation poised to buy the team – Russell was fired on June 21 along with Claire in a general housecleaning, ending a 30-year association with the team. His final managing record was 173–149 (.537).

His departure from the Dodgers followed the new ownership's decision to trade Mike Piazza along with third baseman Todd Zeile to the Florida Marlins. Neither Russell nor Claire knew about the trade. Claire, who like Russell had been with the Dodgers in various capacities since 1969, discussed his and Russell's ouster in his book My 30 Years in Dodger Blue.

Russell went on to coach for the Tampa Bay Devil Rays and managed farm teams of both Tampa Bay and the San Francisco Giants, the Dodgers' archrival. He currently works for Major League Baseball's umpiring division.

Tommy John was good friends with Russell. He described Russell as "a quiet midwesterner...He wasn't a flashy dresser, didn't have a fancy house or car. Those things weren't important to him."

== Managerial record ==
| Team | Year | Regular Season | | | | Postseason | | | |
| Team | Year | Won | Lost | Win % | Finish | Won | Lost | Win % | Result |
|---|---|---|---|---|---|---|---|---|---|
| LAD | 1996 | 49 | 37 | .570 | 2nd in NL West | 0 | 3 | .000 | Lost NLDS (ATL) |
| LAD | 1997 | 88 | 74 | .543 | 2nd in NL West | – | – | – | |
| LAD | 1998 | 36 | 38 | .486 | 3rd in NL West | – | – | – | |
| Totals | | 173 | 149 | .537 | | 0 | 3 | .000 | |

== See also ==
- List of Major League Baseball career stolen bases leaders
- List of Major League Baseball players who spent their entire career with one franchise

Sporting positions
| Preceded by Monty Basgall; Ron Roenicke | Los Angeles Dodgers bench coach 1987–1991; 1994–1996 | Succeeded by Ron Roenicke; Mike Scioscia |
| Preceded by Kevin Kennedy | Albuquerque Dukes manager 1992–1993 | Succeeded by Rick Dempsey |
| Preceded by Frank Howard | Tampa Bay Devil Rays bench coach 2000 | Succeeded by Hal McRae |
