= Steve Cilladi =

American professional baseball player

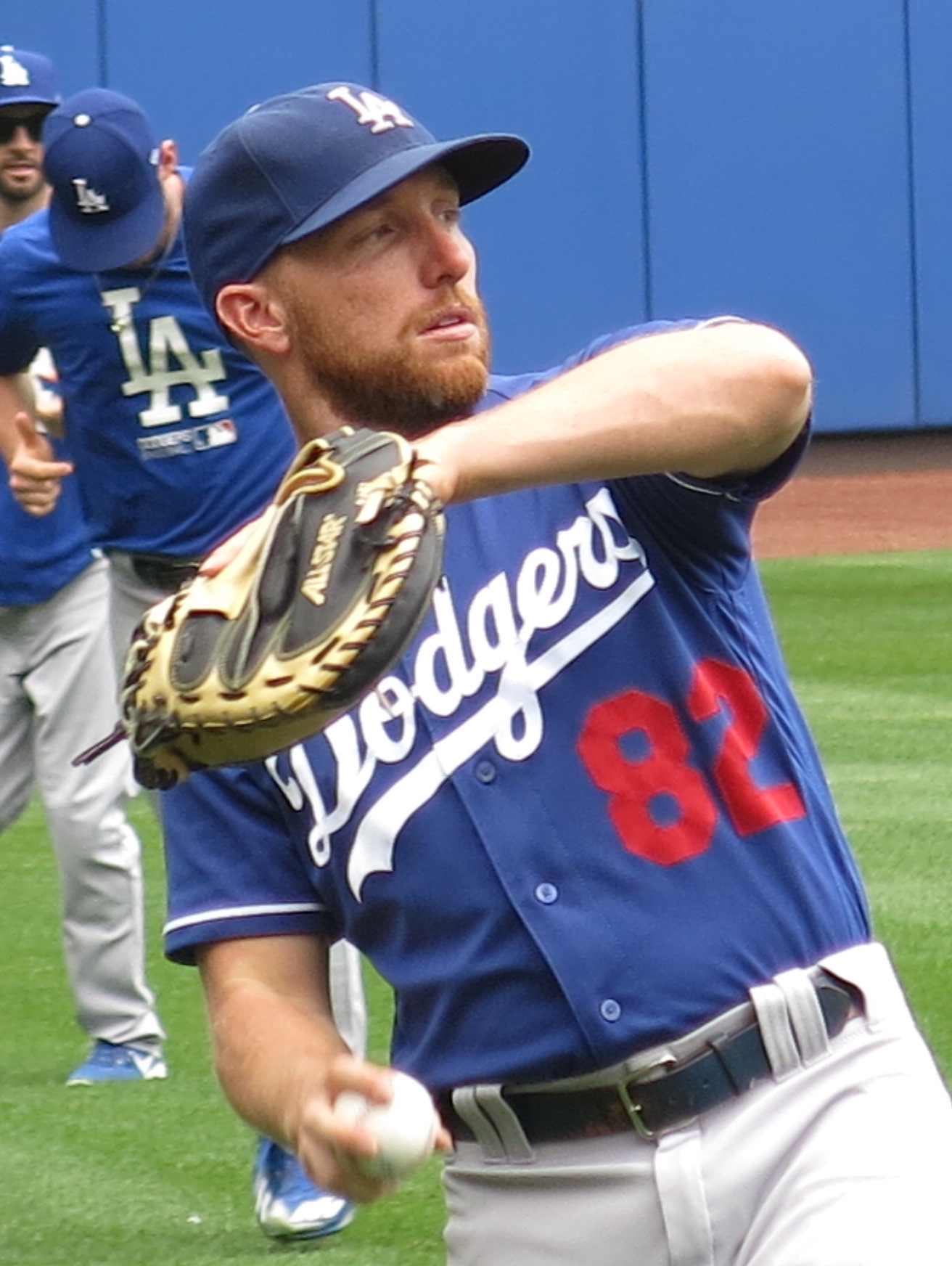
- Cilladi with the Dodgers in 2017
- Catcher / Bullpen Catcher
- Born: March 15, 1987 (age 38); Phoenix, Arizona, U.S.
- Bats: Right Throws: Right
- Stats at Baseball Reference

Teams
- Los Angeles Dodgers (2014–2023)

Career highlights and awards
- World Series champion (2020)

Stephen Cilladi (born March 15, 1987) is an American former professional baseball catcher and coach who served as a bullpen catcher for the Los Angeles Dodgers of Major League Baseball from 2014 through 2023.

== Early life ==
Cilladi was born in Phoenix, Arizona; his father, Dave, was the trainer for the Colorado Rockies. He attended Mountain View High School in Mesa, Arizona. He is of Italian descent. Cilladi played college baseball at Kansas Wesleyan University.

== Professional career ==
=== Minor leagues ===
Cilladi was drafted by the Los Angeles Dodgers in the 33rd round of the 2009 Major League Baseball draft. He split his first year between the Arizona League Dodgers and Inland Empire 66ers, hitting .122 for the rookie team and .000 for the 66ers. Cilladi then spent the 2010 season entirely in the Arizona League, putting up a .292 average with a home run in his second campaign. In 2011, he was promoted to the Great Lakes Loons, where he hit .185. In 2012, he joined the Albuquerque Isotopes, getting only one at-bat and striking out; on the side, he caught bullpens. In 2013, he played again with the Isotopes, appearing in one game, catching all 18 innings of the longest game in the Isotopes' history.

=== Major leagues ===
In 2014, Cilladi joined the Los Angeles Dodgers' major-league coaching staff, serving as the bullpen catcher. He remained with the team through the 2023 season before retiring.
