= Ben Hines =

American baseball player (1935–2021)

- Coach
- Born: November 7, 1935; Yeager, Oklahoma, U.S.
- Died: January 13, 2021 (aged 85); Pomona, California, U.S.
- Batted: Right Threw: Right
- Stats at Baseball Reference

Benjamin Thortan Hines (November 7, 1935 – January 13, 2021) was an American coach in Major League Baseball. He was best remembered as the batting coach for the Los Angeles Dodgers, a position he held from 1985 to 1986 and 1988–1993.

== Background ==
Hines played infield and catcher in the Baltimore Orioles organization with the Bluefield Orioles, Leesburg Orioles and Stockton Ports in 1960 and 1961. During the two seasons he managed the Bluefield Orioles, the ballclub won the Appalachian League Northern Division title with a 42–28 record in 1976 and finished in fourth place at 33–37 in 1977.

He then became the head coach of the University of La Verne team until 1980 and won NAIA coach of the year honors in 1977. He managed the independent league team Alaska Goldpanners from 1978 to 1982.

One of the few coaches to win both the Small College World Series and win the MLB World Series.

Hines died January 13, 2021, at the age of 85.

Preceded by Manny Mota	Los Angeles Dodgers Hitting Coach; 1988-1993	Succeeded by Reggie Smith
