= Brad Fischer =

American baseball player and coach (born 1956)

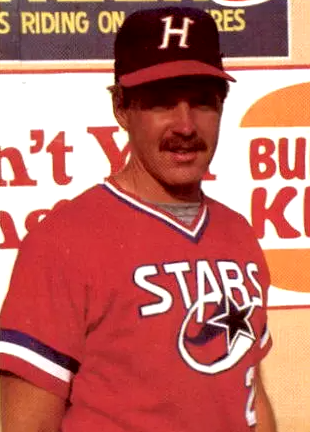
- Fischer with the Huntsville Stars c. 1985
- Catcher / Coach
- Born: June 28, 1956 (age 70); Blissfield, Michigan, U.S.
- Bats: Right Throws: Right

Teams
- Oakland Athletics (1996–2007); Milwaukee Brewers (2009–2010)

Bradley James Fischer (born June 28, 1956) is an American professional baseball coach in Major League Baseball (MLB) and former player development executive, minor league player and manager. He is a former coach for the Oakland Athletics (1995–2007) and Milwaukee Brewers (2009–2010). In 2015 he coached in the Major Leagues on the Pittsburgh Pirates' staff, working under skipper Clint Hurdle. At the end of the 2016 season, Fischer was bumped off the coaching staff and offered a job on the Pirates' player development staff, and as of October 29, 2016 had not accepted that position. Fischer lives in McFarland, Wisconsin.

== Playing career ==
He has spent most of his career in the Oakland organization. Fischer was not drafted, but signed with the Athletics as a free agent out of Western Michigan University in 1978. A catcher, he played just one season in the minors, hitting .267 in 160 at bats for the A's Bend Timber Hawks Class A-Short Season affiliate. He threw and batted right-handed, stood 6 feet 2 inches (1.88 m) tall and weighed 200 pounds (91 kg).

== Managing/coaching career ==
After spending 1979 out of baseball, the 23-year-old Fischer was hired to manage the A's Short Season-A team in Medford, Oregon in 1980. In 1981, he piloted Medford to a Northwest League championship and earned Manager of the Year honors.

After the season, he ran into Billy Martin at the Phoenix airport. Fischer recalls the encounter with the A's manager, who also served as the team's general manager at the time: "Billy saw me and said, 'Great year, kid. Where do you want to manage next year?' I said I had heard of an opening in Madison, Wisconsin. He said, 'The job's yours.' ... I was just glad he remembered it the next day."

Fischer took the Madison club to a league championship as well, and in 1984, added another playoff appearance.

From 1985 to 1987, Fischer managed the Double-A Huntsville Stars to three playoff appearances and a Southern League championship, with the likes of José Canseco and Mark McGwire on his roster (albeit briefly).

He was promoted to the Triple-A Tacoma Tigers in 1988, where he managed for three seasons. In his final season, 1990, he took the Tigers to the postseason.

From 1991–1993, Fischer worked as an instructor in the A's minor-league system, after which he spent two years as assistant director of player development, working alongside Keith Lieppman.

He joined the A's Major League coaching staff in 1995 as the bullpen coach, then moved to first-base coach in 1997, shifted back to the bullpen in 1998, shifted back to first base in 2003 and finally back to the bullpen in 2006. At the conclusion of the 2007 season, the A's announced that he would not return, thus ending a 29-year relationship

In 2008, he managed the State College Spikes, a Class A club affiliated with the Pittsburgh Pirates. Fischer's final managerial record: 761-726, seven total postseason appearances.

On November 4, 2008, Fischer was named the new third base coach for the Milwaukee Brewers. Released after the 2010 season, he was named field coordinator in the Pirates' player development department on December 22, 2010, until his promotion to Hurdle's 2015 staff.
