= 1991 Los Angeles Dodgers season =

1991 Los Angeles Dodgers
- League: National League
- Division: West
- Ballpark: Dodger Stadium
- City: Los Angeles
- Record: 93–69 (.574)
- Divisional place: 2nd
- Owners: Peter O'Malley
- General managers: Fred Claire
- Managers: Tommy Lasorda
- Television: KTTV (11); Vin Scully, Ross Porter, Don Drysdale; SportsChannel Los Angeles; Joel Meyers, Duke Snider, Al Downing
- Radio: KABC; Vin Scully, Ross Porter, Don Drysdale KWKW; Jaime Jarrín, René Cárdenas KAZN; Richard Choi

The 1991 Los Angeles Dodgers season was the 102nd for the franchise in Major League Baseball, and their 34th season in Los Angeles, California.

The season featured an exciting National League West race between the Dodgers and the Atlanta Braves. The Braves edged out the Dodgers to win the division by one game. Center fielder Brett Butler set a National League record with 161 errorless games while Darryl Strawberry hit 28 home runs, the most by a left-handed hitter in Los Angeles history at that point. On the debit side, the Dodgers became the first franchise to be on the receiving end of three perfect games^{[a]} when Dennis Martínez prevented any of their batters from reaching base on July 28.

== Offseason ==
- December 13, 1990: Luis Lopez was released by the Dodgers.
- December 14, 1990: José Vizcaíno was traded by the Dodgers to the Chicago Cubs for Greg Smith.
- December 15, 1990: Hubie Brooks was traded by the Dodgers to the New York Mets for Bob Ojeda and Greg Hansell.
- December 20, 1990: Darren Holmes was traded by the Dodgers to the Milwaukee Brewers for Bert Heffernan.
- December 29, 1990: Jim Poole was traded by the Dodgers to the Texas Rangers for David Lynch and Steve Allen.
- January 15, 1991: Kevin Campbell was traded by the Dodgers to the Oakland Athletics for Dave Veres.

== Regular season ==
=== Season standings ===
NL West
Team	W	L	Pct.	GB	Home	Road
Atlanta Braves	94	68	.580	—	48‍–‍33	46‍–‍35
Los Angeles Dodgers	93	69	.574	1	54‍–‍27	39‍–‍42
San Diego Padres	84	78	.519	10	42‍–‍39	42‍–‍39
San Francisco Giants	75	87	.463	19	43‍–‍38	32‍–‍49
Cincinnati Reds	74	88	.457	20	39‍–‍42	35‍–‍46
Houston Astros	65	97	.401	29	37‍–‍44	28‍–‍53

=== Record vs. opponents ===
1991 National League record Sources:
Team	ATL	CHC	CIN	HOU	LAD	MON	NYM	PHI	PIT	SD	SF	STL
Atlanta	—	6–6	11–7	13–5	7–11	5–7	9–3	5–7	9–3	11–7	9–9	9–3
Chicago	6–6	—	4–8	9–3	2–10	10–7	11–6	8–10	7–11	4–8	6–6	10–8
Cincinnati	7–11	8–4	—	9–9	6–12	6–6	5–7	9–3	2–10	8–10	10–8	4–8
Houston	5–13	3–9	9–9	—	8–10	2–10	7–5	7–5	4–8	6–12	9–9	5–7
Los Angeles	11–7	10–2	12–6	10–8	—	5–7	7–5	7–5	7–5	10–8	8–10	6–6
Montreal	7–5	7–10	6–6	10–2	7–5	—	4–14	4–14	6–12	6–6	7–5	7–11
New York	3–9	6–11	7–5	5–7	5–7	14–4	—	11–7	6–12	7–5	6–6	7–11
Philadelphia	7-5	10–8	3–9	5–7	5–7	14–4	7–11	—	6–12	9–3	6–6	6–12
Pittsburgh	3–9	11–7	10–2	8–4	5–7	12–6	12–6	12–6	—	7–5	7–5	11–7
San Diego	7–11	8–4	10–8	12–6	8–10	6–6	5–7	3–9	5–7	—	11–7	9–3
San Francisco	9–9	6–6	8–10	9–9	10–8	5–7	6–6	6–6	5–7	7–11	—	4–8
St. Louis	3–9	8–10	8–4	7–5	6–6	11–7	11–7	12–6	7–11	3–9	8–4	—

=== Opening Day starters ===
Name	Position
Brett Butler	Center fielder
Juan Samuel	Second baseman
Darryl Strawberry	Right fielder
Eddie Murray	First baseman
Kal Daniels	Left fielder
Lenny Harris	Third baseman
Mike Scioscia	Catcher
Alfredo Griffin	Shortstop
Tim Belcher	Starting pitcher

=== Notable transactions ===
- July 3, 1991: José González was traded by the Dodgers to the Pittsburgh Pirates for Mitch Webster.
- July 31, 1991: Mike Hartley and Braulio Castillo were traded by the Dodgers to the Philadelphia Phillies for Roger McDowell.
- September 6, 1991: Jeff Hartsock was traded by the Dodgers to the Chicago Cubs for Steve Wilson.

=== Roster ===
1991 Los Angeles Dodgers
Roster
Pitchers: 49 Tim Belcher; 54 John Candelaria; 56 Mike Christopher; 25 Dennis Cook; 52 Tim Crews; 35 Jim Gott; 45 Kevin Gross; 46 Mike Hartley; 55 Orel Hershiser; 50 Jay Howell; 48 Ramón Martínez; 31 Roger McDowell; 36 Mike Morgan; 17 Bob Ojeda; 57 John Wetteland; 38 Steve Wilson	Catchers: 8 Gary Carter; 41 Carlos Hernández; 40 Barry Lyons; 14 Mike Scioscia; Infielders: 7 Alfredo Griffin; 3 Jeff Hamilton; 43 Dave Hansen; 29 Lenny Harris; 23 Eric Karros; 33 Eddie Murray; 30 José Offerman; 10 Juan Samuel; 27 Mike Sharperson; 21 Greg Smith	Outfielders: 22 Brett Butler; 28 Kal Daniels; 40 Butch Davis; 38 José González; 47 Tom Goodwin; 15 Chris Gwynn; 5 Stan Javier; 44 Darryl Strawberry; 20 Mitch Webster	Manager: 2 Tommy Lasorda; Coaches: 8 Joey Amalfitano (third base); 58 Mark Cresse (bullpen); 13 Joe Ferguson (first base); 35 Ben Hines (hitting); 11 Manny Mota; 16 Ron Perranoski (pitching); 18 Bill Russell (bench)

== Player stats ==
=== Batting ===
==== Starters by position ====
Note: Pos = Position; G = Games played; AB = At bats; H = Hits; Avg. = Batting average; HR = Home runs; RBI = Runs batted in

Pos	Player	GP	AB	H	Avg.	HR	RBI
C	Mike Scioscia	119	345	91	.264	8	40
1B	Eddie Murray	153	576	150	.260	19	96
2B	Juan Samuel	153	594	161	.271	12	58
3B	Lenny Harris	145	429	123	.287	3	38
SS	Alfredo Griffin	109	350	85	.243	0	27
LF	Kal Daniels	137	461	115	.249	17	73
CF	Brett Butler	161	615	182	.296	2	38
RF	Darryl Strawberry	139	505	134	.265	28	99

==== Other batters ====
Note: G = Games played; AB = At bats; H = Hits; Avg. = Batting average; HR = Home runs; RBI = Runs batted in

Player	GP	AB	H	Avg.	HR	RBI
Gary Carter	101	248	61	.246	6	26
Mike Sharperson	105	216	60	.278	2	20
Stan Javier	121	176	36	.205	1	11
Chris Gwynn	94	139	35	.252	5	22
José Offerman	52	113	22	.195	0	3
Jeff Hamilton	41	94	21	.223	1	14
Mitch Webster	58	74	21	.284	1	10
Dave Hansen	53	56	15	.268	1	5
José González	42	28	0	.000	0	0
Carlos Hernández	15	14	3	.214	0	1
Eric Karros	14	14	1	.071	0	1
Barry Lyons	9	9	0	.000	0	0
Tom Goodwin	16	7	1	.143	0	0
Greg Smith	5	3	0	.000	0	0
Butch Davis	1	1	0	.000	0	0

=== Pitching ===
==== Starting pitchers ====
Note: G = Games pitched; IP = Innings pitched; W = Wins; L = Losses; ERA = Earned run average; SO = Strikeouts

Player	G	IP	W	L	ERA	SO
Mike Morgan	34	236.1	14	10	2.78	140
Ramón Martínez	33	220.1	17	13	3.27	150
Tim Belcher	33	209.1	10	9	2.62	156
Bob Ojeda	31	189.1	12	9	3.18	120
Orel Hershiser	21	112.0	7	2	3.46	73

==== Other pitchers ====
Note: G = Games pitched; IP = Innings pitched; W = Wins; L = Losses; ERA = Earned run average; SO = Strikeouts

Player	G	IP	W	L	ERA	SO
Kevin Gross	46	115.2	10	11	3.58	95

==== Relief pitchers ====
Note: G = Games pitched; W = Wins; L = Losses; SV = Saves; ERA = Earned run average; SO = Strikeouts

Player	G	W	L	SV	ERA	SO
Jay Howell	44	6	5	16	3.18	40
Tim Crews	60	2	3	6	3.43	53
John Candelaria	59	1	1	2	3.74	38
Jim Gott	55	4	3	2	2.96	73
Mike Hartley	40	2	0	1	4.42	44
Roger McDowell	33	6	3	7	2.55	22
Dennis Cook	20	1	0	0	0.51	8
Steve Wilson	11	0	0	2	0.00	5
John Wetteland	6	1	0	0	0.00	9
Mike Christopher	3	0	0	0	0.00	2

== 1991 Awards ==
- 1991 Major League Baseball All-Star Game
  - Brett Butler reserve
  - Mike Morgan reserve
  - Eddie Murray reserve
  - Juan Samuel reserve
  - Darryl Strawberry reserve
- Comeback Player of the Year
  - Orel Hershiser
- NL Player of the Week
  - Mike Morgan (June 17–23)
  - Darryl Strawberry (Aug. 19–25)

== Farm system ==
Level	Team	League	Manager
AAA	Albuquerque Dukes	Pacific Coast League	Kevin Kennedy
AA	San Antonio Missions	Texas League	John Shoemaker
High A	Bakersfield Dodgers	California League	Tom Beyers
High A	Vero Beach Dodgers	Florida State League	Jerry Royster
A-Short Season	Yakima Bears	Northwest League	Joe Vavra
Rookie	Great Falls Dodgers	Pioneer League	Glenn Hoffman
Rookie	Gulf Coast Dodgers	Gulf Coast League	Iván DeJesús
Rookie	DSL Dodgers; DSL Angels/Dodgers/Padres	Dominican Summer League	

== Major League Baseball draft ==
The Dodgers selected 93 players in this draft, the largest draft class in history. Of those, six of them would eventually play Major League baseball. The Dodgers lost their first round pick to the New York Mets and their second round pick to the Montreal Expos as a result of their signing free agents Darryl Strawberry and Kevin Gross and gained a third round pick from the Kansas City Royals as compensation for the loss of free agent Kirk Gibson.

The teams first pick (in round three) was outfielder Todd Hollandsworth from Newport High School in Bellevue, Washington. The 1996 NL Rookie of the Year, Hollandsworth played 12 seasons in Major League Baseball (including 6 with the Dodgers) and hit .276 with 98 home runs and 401 RBI.

1991 draft picks

Round	Name	Position	School	Signed	Career span	Highest level
3	Todd Hollandsworth	OF	Newport High School	Yes	1991–2006	MLB
3	Todd Larocca	SS	The Lovett School	No; Orioles-1994	1994–1996	A+
4	Mike Walkden	LHP	Lake Stevens High School	Yes	1991–1997	A+
5	Douglas Bennett	RHP	University of Arkansas	Yes	1991–1992	A-
6	Mike Iglesias	RHP	Hayward High School	Yes	1991–2000	AAA
7	Brandon Watts	LHP	Ruston High School	Yes	1991–1997	AA
8	Vincent Jackson	OF	Central High School	Yes	1991–1993	A-
9	Dennis Winicki	SS	Mona Shores High School	Yes	1991–1992	Rookie
10	Lonnie Jackson	OF	George Washington High School	Yes	1991	Rookie
11	Chris Latham	SS	Basic High School	Yes	1991–2007	MLB
12	Carlo Walton	C	East Side High School	Yes	1991–1992	Rookie
13	Dave Fitzpatrick	RHP	Sullivan South High School	Yes	1991–1994	A
14	Bob Legendre	RHP	Cypress College	Yes	1991	A-
15	Erik Zammarchi	OF	College of Marin	Yes	1991–1992	A-
16	Chris Sinacori	RHP	Florida International University	Yes	1991–1996	A+
17	Chad Zerbe	LHP	Hillsborough Community College	Yes	1991–2005	MLB
18	Jo Jo Smith	LHP	Vanderbilt University	Yes	1991–2001	A+
19	Rick Gorecki	RHP	Oak Forest High School	Yes	1991–1999	MLB
20	Bill Stephens	RHP	Ringgold High School	Yes	1991–1997	A-
21	Kevin Zahner	C	Ellington High School	Yes	1991–1995	A+
22	Ken Huckaby	C	San Joaquin Delta College	Yes	1991–2008	MLB
23	Dave Carroll	LHP	Chantilly High School	No; Cardinals-1993	1993–2003	AAA
24	Kevin Smith	LHP	Columbus High School	Yes	1991–1993	A-
25	Murph Proctor	1B	University of Southern California	Yes	1991–1997	AA
26	Christopher Crabtree	LHP	Middle Tennessee State University	Yes	1991	A-
27	Todd Soares	OF	New Bedford High School	Yes	1991	Rookie
28	Tito Landrum	OF	Jacksonville State University	Yes	1991–1999	AA
29	Vernon Spearman	OF	California State University, Fresno	Yes	1991–2004	AAA
30	Jack Johnson	C	University of Arizona	Yes	1991–1999	AA
31	Chris Demetral	2B	Western Michigan University	Yes	1991–2001	AAA
32	Travis Hall	LHP	Middle Georgia College	No		
33	Jay Kirkpatrick	C	Methodist College	Yes	1991–2001	AAA
34	Cedric Allen	LHP	McLennan Community College	No; Reds-1994	1994–1996	AA
35	Ed Acosta	SS	Rock Falls High School	No; Brewers-1993	1993–1997	A
36	Ken Sikes	1B	Perry High School	No; Dodgers-1992	1993–1996	A+
37	Alejandro Pereira	LHP	Miami Dade College	No	1995	Ind
38	Gary Cope	LHP	Motlow State Community College	Yes	1991–1992	Rookie
39	Clifton Joyce	LHP	South Stokes High School	No		
40	Michael Sube	LHP	West Virginia University	No		
41	Carlos Castillo	RHP	Cypress College	Yes	1991–1998	AA
42	Carlos Thomas	RHP	Tennessee State University	Yes	1991–1996	AA
43	Chris West	3B	Louisburg College	No; Padres-1993	1993–1994	A
44	Eric Vorbeck	OF	California State University, Sacramento	Yes	1991–1993	A+
45	Marc Tramuta	SS	St. Bonaventure University	Yes	1991	A-
46	Mario Moody	SS	Glynn Academy	No; Cubs-1994	1994	Rookie
47	Kenneth Jones	1B	Pelham High School	No; Cubs-1993	1993	A-
48	Matthew Svoboda	RHP	El Dorado High School	No		
49	Richard Ware	2B	Greenville College	No		
50	German Gonzalez	3B	College of the Desert	Yes	1991–1992	Rookie
51	Dustin Rennsnies	C	A. Crawford Mosley High School	No		
52	Cameron Aronetz	LHP	Simon Fraser University	Yes	1991–1993	A+
53	Chris Vaughn	LHP	John A. Logan College	No		
54	Javier Ortiz	RHP	Manuela Toro High School	No		
55	Brian Clark	C	Armijo High School	No; Dodgers-1992	1993	Rookie
56	Brian Wise	LHP	El Segundo High School	No		
57	Roger Cropper	OF	Central High School	No; Mariners – 1994	1994–1995	Rookie
58	William Belcher	OF	Fairfax High School	No		
59	Jon Goodrich	RHP	Sonoma High School	No; Cubs-1992	1992–1995	A
60	Scott Klingenbeck	LHP	Allegany College of Maryland	No; Orioles-1992	1992–1999	MLB
61	Jareld Dunkin	C	Capital Hill High School	No		
62	Kevin Clark	3B	Basic High School	No; Red Sox-1993	1993–2000	AA
63	Rich Linares	RHP	Cerritos College	Yes	1993–2002	AA
64	Shawn Buhner	1B	Clear Creek High School	No; Mariners-1994	1994–1999	AAA
65	David Silvas	SS	San Jacinto High School	No		
66	Jason Bobb	RHP	Chippewa Falls High School	Yes	1992–1993	A+
67	Derek Ornelas	OF	Sylmar High School	No		
68	Chris Kenady	OF	Westonka High School	No		
69	Richard Heineman	C	Culver City High School	No		
70	Joe Jacobsen	RHP	Fresno City College	Yes	1992–1999	AAA
71	Mark Fraser	RHP	La Salle High School	No		
72	Kerry Cosgrove	OF	Palm Desert High School	No		
73	Stephane DiLauro	SS	Academy Laval Bib	No		
74	Eric Ontiveros	RHP	Bakersfield College	No		
75	Joshua Hamik	C	Mount Si High School	No		
76	Brent Crowther	RHP	Capilano Junior College	No; Rockies-1994	1994–1996	AAA
77	Rich Haley	OF	Sacramento City College	Yes	1992–1993	A-
78	Chip Glass	OF	Santa Rosa Junior College	No; Indians-1994	1994–2000	AAA
79	Stephen Matyczyk	SS	Southington High School	No		
80	Ismael Casteneda	LHP	Fresno City College	No		
81	Gar Vallone	SS	El Dorado High School	No; Angels-1995	1995–1998	AA
82	Michael Sanburn	RHP	College of San Mateo	No		
83	Aaron Wofford	SS	Yuba Community College	No		
84	José Martínez	RHP	University of Nebraska–Lincoln	No		
85	Darrell Sutton	RHP	Beverly Hills High School	No		
86	Brett Schafer	3B	Santa Monica High School	No; Royals-1995	1995–1998	A
87	Andy Saltsman	C	Crescenta Valley High School	No		
88	Jumaane Leach	OF	San Marin High School	No; Padres-1994	1994–1996	A
89	Martin Meza	RHP	Cerritos College	No		
90	Todd Blyleven	RHP	Cypress College	No; Angels-1993	1993–1997	AA
91	Steve Arffa	LHP	Glendora High School	No; Mets-1994	1994–1996	AA
92	Derek Gauthier	2B		No	1996–1997	Ind
93	William Stroud	C	Dunwoody High School	No		
94	Shawn McNally	SS	Winder-Barrow High School	No; Cardinals-1995	1995–1997	A+

== Notes ==
^{a} The Tampa Bay Rays equalled this record on August 15 of 2012 when Félix Hernández pitched a perfect game for the Seattle Mariners against the Rays. Of the other 28 MLB franchises, only the Minnesota Twins have been on the receiving end of more than one perfect game (in 1968 and 1998).
