= 1990 Los Angeles Dodgers season =

1990 Los Angeles Dodgers
- League: National League
- Division: West
- Ballpark: Dodger Stadium
- City: Los Angeles
- Record: 86–76 (.531)
- Divisional place: 2nd
- Owners: Peter O'Malley
- General managers: Fred Claire
- Managers: Tommy Lasorda
- Television: KTTV (11); Vin Scully, Ross Porter, Don Drysdale; SportsChannel Los Angeles; Joel Meyers, Ron Cey
- Radio: KABC; Vin Scully, Ross Porter, Don Drysdale KWKW; Jaime Jarrín, René Cárdenas, Tito Rondon KAZN; Richard Choi

The 1990 Los Angeles Dodgers season was the 101st for the franchise in Major League Baseball, and their 33rd season in Los Angeles, California.

The Dodgers finished in second place to the Cincinnati Reds in the National League West race, as the team's pitching staff led the majors with 29 complete games. Ramón Martínez became the youngest Dodger starter to win 20 games since Ralph Branca, and also tied Sandy Koufax's club record with 18 strikeouts against the Atlanta Braves on June 4. On June 29, Fernando Valenzuela managed to throw a no-hitter against the St. Louis Cardinals, on the same night that Dave Stewart of the Oakland Athletics no-hit the Toronto Blue Jays.

== Offseason ==
- November 9, 1989: Acquired Jeff Bittiger from the Chicago White Sox for Tracy Woodson
- December 20, 1989: Acquired Juan Samuel from the New York Mets for Mike Marshall and Alejandro Peña
- April 1, 1990: Acquired Terry Wells from the Houston Astros for Franklin Stubbs

== Regular season ==
=== Season standings ===
NL West
Team	W	L	Pct.	GB	Home	Road
Cincinnati Reds	91	71	.562	—	46‍–‍35	45‍–‍36
Los Angeles Dodgers	86	76	.531	5	47‍–‍34	39‍–‍42
San Francisco Giants	85	77	.525	6	49‍–‍32	36‍–‍45
Houston Astros	75	87	.463	16	49‍–‍32	26‍–‍55
San Diego Padres	75	87	.463	16	37‍–‍44	38‍–‍43
Atlanta Braves	65	97	.401	26	37‍–‍44	28‍–‍53

=== Record vs. opponents ===
1990 National League record Sources:
Team	ATL	CHC	CIN	HOU	LAD	MON	NYM	PHI	PIT	SD	SF	STL
Atlanta	—	6–6	8–10	5–13	6–12	6–6	4–8	5–7	5–7	8–10	5–13	7–5
Chicago	6–6	—	4–8	6–6	3–9	11–7	9–9	11–7	4–14	8–4	7–5	8–10
Cincinnati	10–8	8–4	—	11–7	9–9	9–3	6–6	7–5	6–6	9–9	7–11	9–3
Houston	13–5	6–6	7–11	—	9–9	5–7	5–7	5–7	5–7	4–14	10–8	6–6
Los Angeles	12–6	9–3	9–9	9–9	—	6–6	5–7	8–4	4–8	9–9	8–10	7–5
Montreal	6–6	7–11	3–9	7–5	6–6	—	8–10	10–8	13–5	7–5	7–5	11–7
New York	8–4	9–9	6–6	7–5	7–5	10–8	—	10–8	10–8	5–7	7–5	12–6
Philadelphia	7-5	7–11	5–7	7–5	4–8	8–10	8–10	—	6–12	7–5	8–4	10–8
Pittsburgh	7–5	14–4	6–6	7–5	8–4	5–13	8–10	12–6	—	10–2	8–4	10–8
San Diego	10–8	4–8	9–9	14–4	9–9	5–7	7–5	5–7	2–10	—	7–11	3–9
San Francisco	13–5	5–7	11–7	8–10	10–8	5–7	5–7	4–8	4–8	11–7	—	9–3
St. Louis	5–7	10–8	3–9	6–6	5–7	7–11	6–12	8–10	8–10	9–3	3–9	—

=== Opening day lineup ===
Opening Day starters
Name	Position
Juan Samuel	Center fielder
Willie Randolph	Second baseman
Hubie Brooks	Right fielder
Eddie Murray	First baseman
Kal Daniels	Left fielder
Jeff Hamilton	Third baseman
Mike Scioscia	Catcher
Alfredo Griffin	Shortstop
Orel Hershiser	Starting pitcher

=== Roster ===
1990 Los Angeles Dodgers
Roster
Pitchers: 22 Don Aase; 49 Tim Belcher; 25 Dennis Cook; 52 Tim Crews; 35 Jim Gott; 46 Mike Hartley; 55 Orel Hershiser; 20 Darren Holmes; 50 Jay Howell; 54 Mike Maddux; 48 Ramón Martínez; 36 Mike Morgan; 56 Mike Munoz; 31 Jim Neidlinger; 26 Pat Perry; 31,54 Jim Poole; 59 Ray Searage; 34 Fernando Valenzuela; 51 Dave Walsh; 51 Terry Wells; 57 John Wetteland	Catchers: 17 Rick Dempsey; 25 Darrin Fletcher; 41 Carlos Hernández; 40 Barry Lyons; 14 Mike Scioscia; Infielders: 7 Alfredo Griffin; 3 Jeff Hamilton; 43 Dave Hansen; 29 Lenny Harris; 9 Mickey Hatcher; 12 Luis Lopez; 33 Eddie Murray; 30 José Offerman; 12 Willie Randolph; 10 Juan Samuel; 27 Mike Sharperson; 20 Brian Traxler; 44 José Vizcaíno	Outfielders: 21 Hubie Brooks; 28 Kal Daniels; 23 Kirk Gibson; 38 José González; 15 Chris Gwynn; 5 Stan Javier; 31 John Shelby	Manager: 2 Tommy Lasorda; Coaches: 8 Joey Amalfitano (third base); 58 Mark Cresse (bullpen); 13 Joe Ferguson (first base); 35 Ben Hines (hitting); 11 Manny Mota; 16 Ron Perranoski (pitching); 18 Bill Russell (bench)

=== Notable Transactions ===
- May 13, 1990: Acquired Stan Javier from the Oakland Athletics for Willie Randolph.
- June 2, 1990: John Shelby was released by the Dodgers.
- September 13, 1990: Acquired Dennis Cook from the Philadelphia Phillies for Darrin Fletcher.
- October 1, 1990: Acquired Mike Wilkins from the Detroit Tigers for Mike Munoz.

== Game log ==
=== Regular season ===
Legend
	Dodgers win
	Dodgers loss
	Postponement
	Eliminated from playoff race
**Bold**	Dodgers team member

1990 regular season game log: 86–76 (Home: 47–34; Away: 39–42)
April: 11–10 (Home: 6–7; Away: 5–3)

#	Date	Time (PT)	Opponent	Score	Win	Loss	Save	Time of Game	Attendance	Record	Box/ Streak

May: 14–13 (Home: 8–3; Away: 6–10)

#	Date	Time (PT)	Opponent	Score	Win	Loss	Save	Time of Game	Attendance	Record	Box/ Streak

June: 11–15 (Home: 8–6; Away: 3–9)

#	Date	Time (PT)	Opponent	Score	Win	Loss	Save	Time of Game	Attendance	Record	Box/ Streak

July: 16–11 (Home: 10–7; Away: 6–4)

#	Date	Time (PT)	Opponent	Score	Win	Loss	Save	Time of Game	Attendance	Record	Box/ Streak

August: 18–12 (Home: 7–4; Away: 11–8)

#	Date	Time (PT)	Opponent	Score	Win	Loss	Save	Time of Game	Attendance	Record	Box/ Streak

September: 14–14 (Home: 6–6; Away: 8–8)

#	Date	Time (PT)	Opponent	Score	Win	Loss	Save	Time of Game	Attendance	Record	Box/ Streak

October: 2–1 (Home: 2–1; Away: 0–0)

#	Date	Time (PT)	Opponent	Score	Win	Loss	Save	Time of Game	Attendance	Record	Box/ Streak

== Player stats ==
=== Batting ===
==== Starters by position ====
Note: Pos = Position; G = Games played; AB = At bats; H = Hits; Avg. = Batting average; HR = Home runs; RBI = Runs batted in

Pos	Player	GP	AB	H	Avg.	HR	RBI
C	Mike Scioscia	135	435	115	.264	12	66
1B	Eddie Murray	155	558	184	.330	26	95
2B	Juan Samuel	143	492	119	.242	13	52
SS	Alfredo Griffin	141	461	97	.210	1	35
3B	Mike Sharperson	129	357	106	.297	3	36
LF	Kal Daniels	130	450	133	.296	27	94
CF	Kirk Gibson	89	315	82	.260	8	38
RF	Hubie Brooks	153	568	151	.266	20	91

==== Other batters ====
Note: G = Games played; AB = At bats; H = Hits; Avg. = Batting average; HR = Home runs; RBI = Runs batted in

Player	GP	AB	H	Avg.	HR	RBI
Lenny Harris	137	431	131	.304	2	29
Stan Javier	104	276	84	.304	3	24
Chris Gwynn	101	141	40	.284	5	22
Mickey Hatcher	85	132	28	.212	0	13
Rick Dempsey	62	128	25	.195	2	15
José González	106	99	23	.232	2	8
Willie Randolph	26	96	26	.271	1	9
José Offerman	29	58	9	.155	1	7
José Vizcaíno	37	51	14	.275	0	2
Jeff Hamilton	7	24	3	.125	0	1
John Shelby	25	24	6	.250	0	2
Carlos Hernández	10	20	4	.200	0	1
Brian Traxler	9	11	1	.091	0	0
Dave Hansen	5	7	1	.143	0	1
Luis Lopez	6	6	0	.000	0	0
Barry Lyons	3	5	1	.200	1	2
Darrin Fletcher	2	1	0	.000	0	0

=== Pitching ===
==== Starting pitchers ====
Note; G = Games pitched; IP = Innings pitched, W = Wins; L = Losses; ERA = Earned run average; SO = Strikeouts

Player	G	IP	W	L	ERA	SO
Ramón Martínez	33	234.1	20	6	2.92	223
Mike Morgan	33	211.0	11	15	3.75	106
Fernando Valenzuela	33	204.0	13	13	4.59	115
Tim Belcher	24	153.0	9	9	4.00	102
Jim Neidlinger	12	74.0	5	3	3.28	46
Orel Hershiser	4	25.1	1	1	4.26	16
Terry Wells	5	20.2	1	2	7.84	18

==== Other pitchers ====
Note; G = Games pitched, IP = Innings pitched: W = Wins; L = Losses; ERA = Earned run average; SO = Strikeouts

Player	G	IP	W	L	ERA	SO
Mike Hartley	32	79.1	6	3	2.95	76
John Wetteland	22	43.0	2	4	4.81	36
Dennis Cook	5	14.1	1	1	7.53	6

==== Relief pitchers ====
Note: G = Games pitched; W = Wins; L = Losses; SV = Saves; ERA = Earned run average; SO = Strikeouts

Player	G	W	L	SV	ERA	SO
Jay Howell	45	5	5	16	2.18	59
Tim Crews	66	4	5	5	2.77	76
Jim Gott	50	3	5	3	2.90	44
Don Aase	32	3	1	3	4.97	24
Ray Searage	29	1	0	0	2.78	19
Dave Walsh	20	1	0	1	3.86	15
Jim Poole	16	0	0	0	4.22	6
Darren Holmes	14	0	1	0	5.19	19
Mike Maddux	11	0	1	0	6.53	11
Mike Munoz	8	0	1	0	3.18	2
Pat Perry	7	0	0	0	8.10	2

== 1990 Awards ==
- 1990 Major League Baseball All-Star Game
  - Mike Scioscia starter
  - Ramón Martínez reserve
- Silver Slugger Award
  - Eddie Murray
- TSN National League All-Star
  - Mike Scioscia
  - Eddie Murray
- NL Pitcher of the Month
  - Ramón Martínez (June 1990)
- NL Player of the Month
  - Kal Daniels (September 1990)
- NL Player of the Week
  - Fernando Valenzuela (June 25 – July 1)

== Farm system ==
Level	Team	League	Manager
**AAA**	**Albuquerque Dukes**	**Pacific Coast League**	**Kevin Kennedy**
AA	San Antonio Missions	Texas League	John Shoemaker
High A	Bakersfield Dodgers	California League	Tom Beyers
High A	Vero Beach Dodgers	Florida State League	Joe Alvarez
A-Short Season	Yakima Bears	Northwest League	Jerry Royster
**Rookie**	**Great Falls Dodgers**	**Pioneer League**	**Joe Vavra**
**Rookie**	**Gulf Coast Dodgers**	**Gulf Coast League**	**Iván DeJesús**
Rookie	San Pedro de Marcoris Dodgers; Cibao Dodgers	Dominican Summer League	

Teams in BOLD won League Championships

== Major League Baseball draft ==
The Dodgers drafted 63 players in this draft. Of those, seven of them would eventually play Major League baseball. The Dodgers lost their second round pick to the Montreal Expos because they had signed free agent Hubie Brooks but they gained two supplemental second round picks as compensation for losing Dave Anderson and John Tudor. They also lost their third round pick to the Pittsburgh Pirates because they had signed pitcher Jim Gott.

The first round pick was left-handed pitcher Ronnie Walden out of Blanchard High School in Blanchard, Oklahoma. Serious arm injuries derailed his career and he only pitched in seven games in the Dodgers farm system, three in 1990 and four in 1993 when he attempted a comeback. He retired for good in 1994 with his arm so bad he would never be able to even play catch with his kids.

This years draft class was a disappointment as neither second round pick got out of "A" ball. Mike Busch, the fourth round pick, made the Majors, appearing in 51 games in 1995 and 1996 as a third baseman for the Dodgers but his decision to be a replacement player during the 1994–95 strike made it hard for him to catch on. He played in Korea and later played and managed in the independent Northern League. Busch was the only one of the Dodgers first 13 draft picks to advance past class A. Pitcher Todd Williams, who was selected in the 54th round, was the only Major Leaguer that signed from this draft class to have a length career as he had a 12-14 record in 227 games over parts of eight seasons.

1990 draft picks

Round	Name	Position	School	Signed	Career span	Highest level
1	Ronnie Walden	LHP	Blanchard High School	Yes	1990–1993	A+
2s	Leory Williams	SS	East St. John High School	Yes	1990–1993	A+
2s	Scott Freeman	RHP	University of Wyoming	Yes	1990–1994	A+
4	Mike Busch	1B	Iowa State University	Yes	1990–2001	**MLB**
5	Frank Smith	OF	Riverside Poly High School	Yes	1990–1995	A+
6	Alton Pinkney	OF	Glynn Academy High School	Yes	1990–1993	A+
7	Daniel Gray	C	State University of New York at Binghamton	Yes	1990–1996	A+
8	Jason Kerr	LHP	Cerritos College	Yes	1990–1994	A+
9	Jacob Botts	RHP	North Monterey County High School	Yes	1990–1994	A-
10	Kenneth Hamilton	RHP	Patrick Henry Junior College	Yes	1990–1993	A+
11	Erick Mapp	OF	Natrona County High School	No		
12	Keoki Farrish	OF	Ohlone College	Yes	1990–1992	A+
13	Gregory Davis	RHP	El Camino College	Yes	1990–1991	Rookie
14	Jimmy Daspit	RHP	California State University, Sacramento	Yes	1990–1997	AAA
15	Timothy Griffin	3B	Stanford University	Yes	1990–1992	A+
16	Donn Cunnigan	OF	Gahr High School	No; Pirates-1994	1994	Rookie
17	Steve Mintz	C	Mount Olive College	Yes	1990–2001	**MLB**
18	Lonnie Webb	SS	South Georgia College	Yes	1990–1993	A+
19	Burgess Watts	3B	College of DuPage	Yes	1990–1993	A+
20	Peter Nurre	C	Cabrillo College	Yes	1990	Rookie
21	Wayne Lindemann	LHP	Lower Columbia College	No; White Sox-1992	1992–1996	A+
22	Michael Racobaldo	RHP	Pennsauken High School	Yes	1990	Rookie
23	Ron Maurer	SS	University of North Carolina at Chapel Hill	Yes	1990–2000	AAA
24	Mike Mimbs	LHP	Mercer University	Yes	1990–1998	**MLB**
25	Mark Mimbs	LHP	Mercer University	Yes	1990–1999	**NPB**
26	Gordon Tipton	RHP	Oklahoma State University	Yes	1990–1992	A+
27	Jody Treadwell	RHP	Jacksonville University	Yes	1990–2000	AAA
28	Randall Graves	SS	Riverside Community College	Yes	1990–1991	Rookie
29	David Baumann	RHP	Western New England College	Yes	1990–1991	A+
30	Ben O'Connor	LHP	University of Maryland	Yes	1990–1991	A+
31	Domingo Mota	OF	California State University, Fullerton	Yes	1990–1995	AA
32	Anthony Rodriguez	C	José de Diego High School	Yes	1991–2004	Rookie
33	Albert Maldonado	LHP	Barringer High School	Yes	1990–1992	A+
34	Kurt Ehmann	SS		No; Giants-1992	1992–1997	AAA
35	Steve Matos	C	Chaminade High School	No		
36	Michael Brady	LHP	Florida State University	Yes	1990–1995	A+
37	Ira Smith	OF	University of Maryland Eastern Shore	Yes	1990–2003	AAA
38	Brady Raggio	RHP	San Ramon Valley High School	No; Cardinals-1992	1992–2005	**MLB**
39	Mark Sweeney	OF	University of Maine at Orono	No; Angels-1991	1991–2008	**MLB**
40	Larry Jacinto	RHP	Southern California Christian College	Yes	1990–1991	Rookie
41	Jay Cranford	2B	Middle Georgia College	No; Pirates-1992	1992–1996	AA
42	Clint Minear	LHP	East Mississippi Community College	Yes	1991–1995	A-
43	Charles Williams	OF	Meridian Community College	No		
44	Edward Lund	C	University of Notre Dame	Yes	1990–1993	A+
45	Jason Sengbusch	RHP	Westfield High School	No		
46	Thomas Matthews	RHP	Edinboro University of Pennsylvania	Yes	1990	Rookie
47	Joe Jacobsen	RHP	Clovis West High School	No; Los Angeles Dodgers-1991	1992–1999	AAA
48	Robert Sweeney	3B	Waukesha County Technical College	Yes	1990–1992	A+
49	Dick Gorman	OF	State University of New York at Binghamton	Yes	1990	A+
50	Ismael Castaneda	LHP	Hanford High School	No		
51	Mario Johnson	SS	Simmons High School	No		
52	Gordon Hockett	1B	Tulsa Union High School	No		
53	Robert Calton	LHP	Lehi High School	No		
54	Todd Williams	RHP	Onondaga Community College	Yes	1991–2008	**MLB**
55	Brett Kim	3B	College of Marin	No		
56	Joe Wagner	RHP	Adams Friendship High School	No; Brewers-1993		
57	Patrick Reed	SS	Mount Hood Community College	Yes	1991–1993	A-
58	Melvin Warren	OF	Solano Community College	Yes	1991–1992	Rookie
59	Daniel Andrews	OF	California State Polytechnic University, Pomona	Yes	1990–1991	Rookie
60	Dave Madsen	3B	Murray High School	No; Cardinals-1993	1993–1996	A+
61	Greg Raisola	C	Nogales High School	No		
62	Roger Sweeney	OF	College of Marin	Yes	1991–1992	A-
63	Andy Abad	OF	Jupiter High School	No; Red Sox-1993	1993–2008	**MLB**
