= List of Los Angeles Dodgers first-round draft picks =

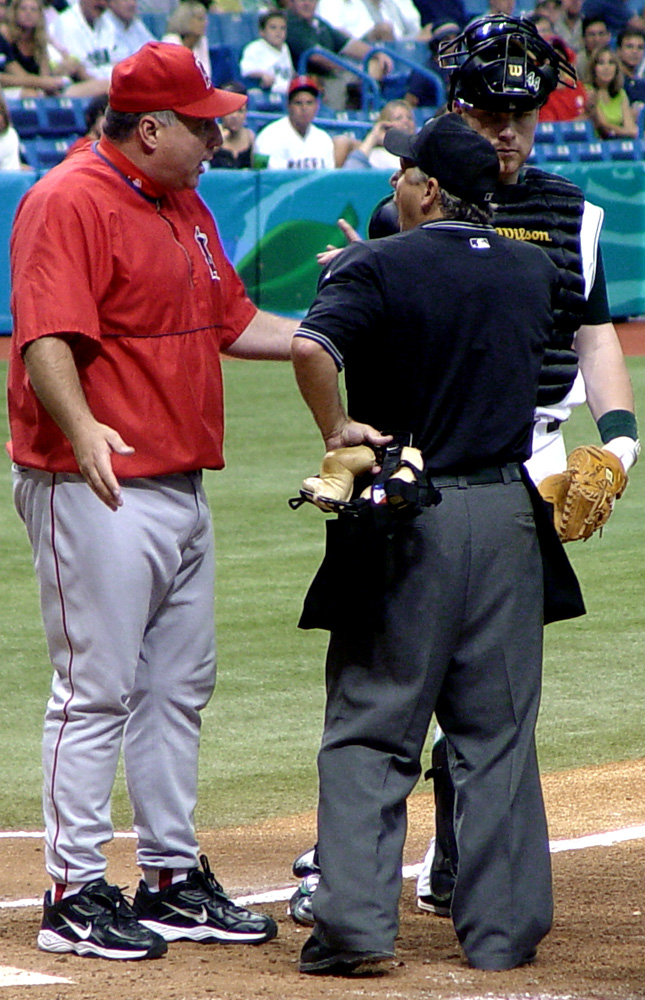
Mike Scioscia (1976) won championships with the Dodgers in 1981 and 1988.

The Los Angeles Dodgers are a Major League Baseball (MLB) franchise based in Los Angeles, California. They play in the National League West division. Since the institution of MLB's Rule 4 Draft, the Dodgers have selected 67 players in the first round. Officially known as the "First-Year Player Draft", the Rule 4 Draft is MLB's primary mechanism for assigning players from high schools, colleges, and other amateur clubs to its franchises. The draft order is determined based on the previous season's standings, with the team possessing the worst record receiving the first pick. In addition, teams which lost free agents in the previous off-season may be awarded compensatory or supplementary picks.

Of the 67 players picked in the first round by Los Angeles, 37 have been pitchers, the most of any position; 24 of these were right-handed, while 12 were left-handed. Nine players at shortstop and nine in the outfield were selected, while five catchers, three first basemen, and three third basemen were taken as well. The team also selected two players at second base. Seven of the players came from high schools or universities in the state of Texas, while California follows with six players.

Nine Dodgers first-round picks have won a World Series championship with the team. Pitchers Bob Welch (1977) and Steve Howe (1979) played with the 1981 championship team. Shortstop Dave Anderson (1981) and first baseman Franklin Stubbs (1982) were a part of the 1988 championship team. Catcher Mike Scioscia (1976) won championships with both teams. Pitchers Clayton Kershaw (2006) and Walker Buehler (2015), shortstop Corey Seager (2012), and catcher Will Smith (2016) all played with the 2020 championship team. Welch was also on the Oakland Athletics' 1988 team which lost to the Dodgers in the 1988 Series. Howe, Seager, and Rick Sutcliffe (1974) each won the MLB Rookie of the Year award.

The Dodgers have made 11 selections in the supplemental round of the draft and have never made the first overall selection. They have also had 16 compensatory picks since the institution of the First-Year Player Draft in 1965. These additional picks are provided when a team loses a particularly valuable free agent in the prior off-season,^{[V]} or, more recently, if a team fails to sign a draft pick from the previous year. The Dodgers have failed to sign one of their first-round picks, Luke Hochevar (2005), but received no compensation pick.

== Key ==
Year	Links to an article about that year's Major League Baseball draft
Position	Indicates the secondary/collegiate position at which the player was drafted, rather than the professional position the player may have gone on to play
Pick	Indicates the number of the pick
*	Player did not sign with the Dodgers
§	Indicates a supplemental pick
'XX	Player was a member of the Dodgers' championship teams in 1981, 1988, 2020, 2024 or 2025

== Picks ==
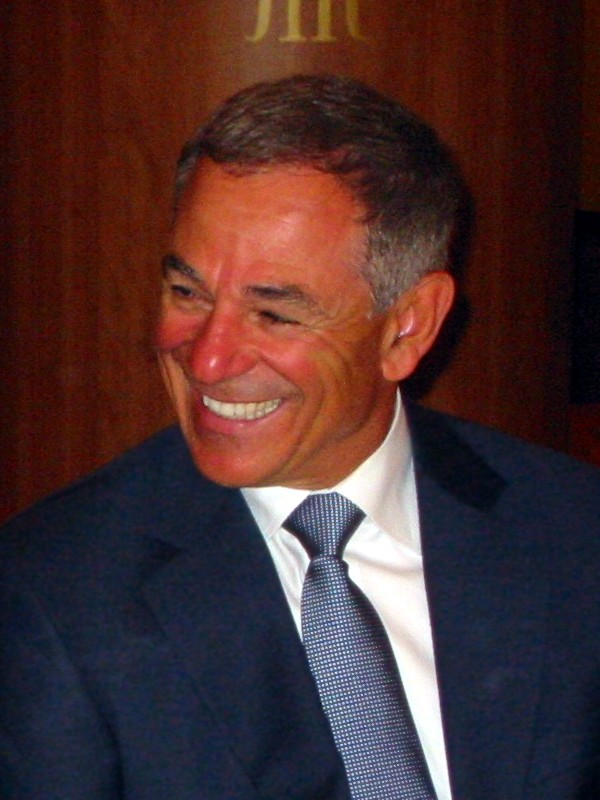
Bobby Valentine (1968) is the only player drafted by the Dodgers in the first round from Connecticut.

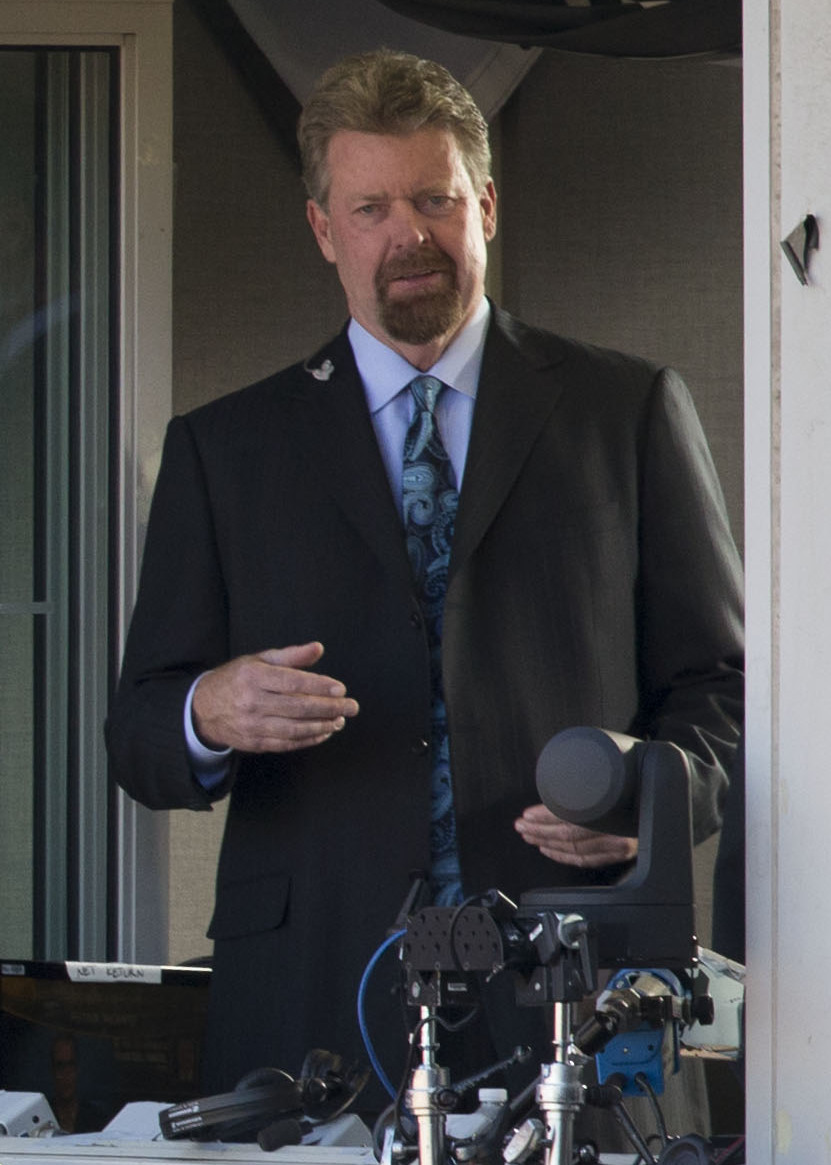
Rick Sutcliffe (1974) is one of three players taken by the Dodgers in the first round who went on to win the Rookie of the Year award.

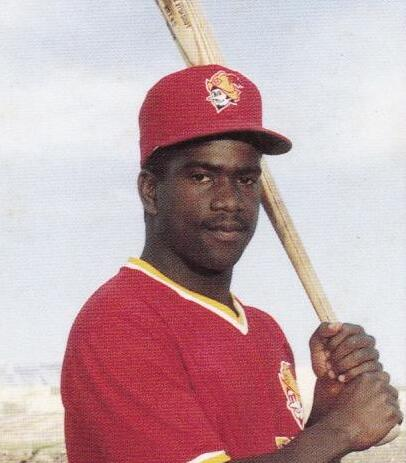
Chris Gwynn (1985) was the first college baseball player the Dodgers selected from California in the first round.

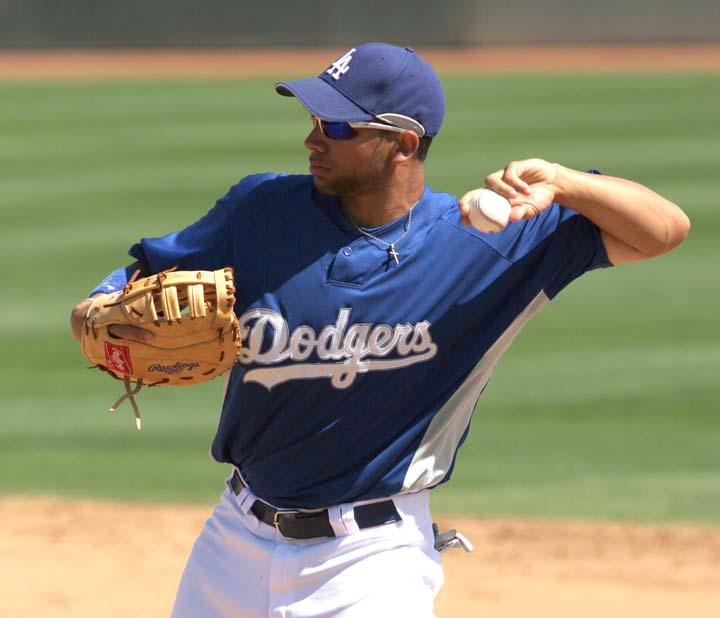
James Loney (2002) is one of six players from Texas the Dodgers have drafted in the first round.

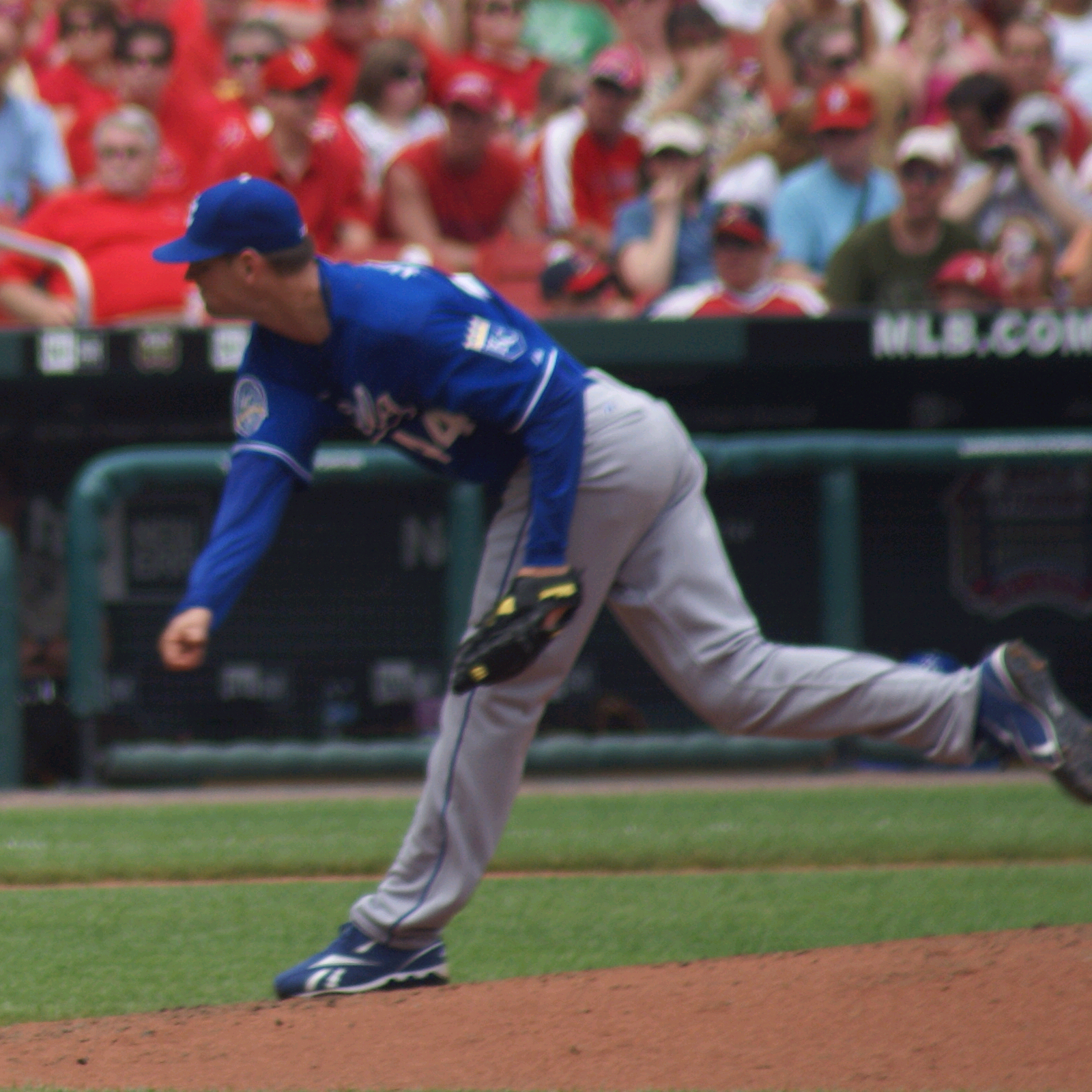
Luke Hochevar did not sign with the Dodgers after being drafted in the supplemental round by the Dodgers in 2005.

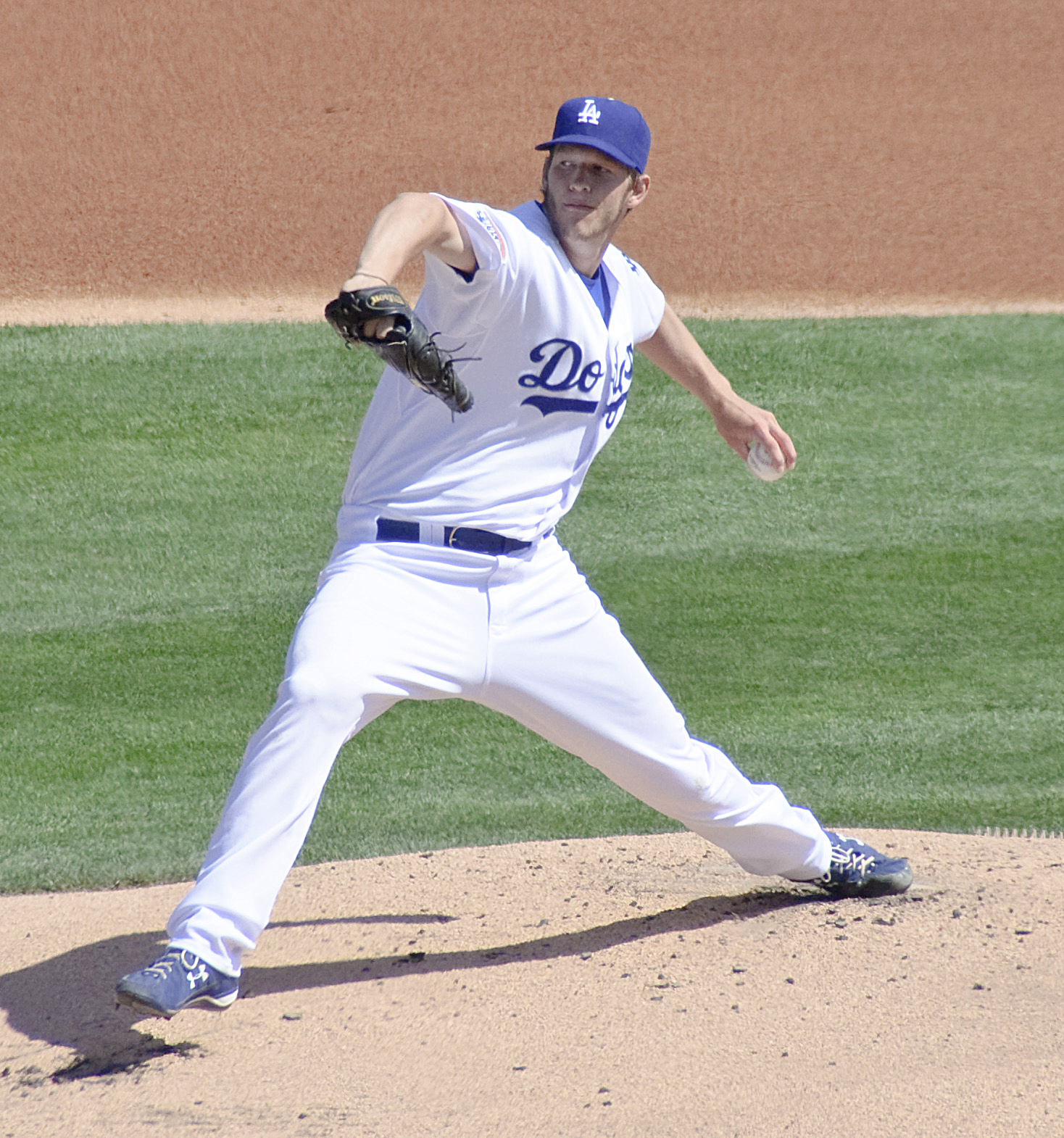
Clayton Kershaw (2006) won the Cy Young Award in 2011, 2013, and 2014.

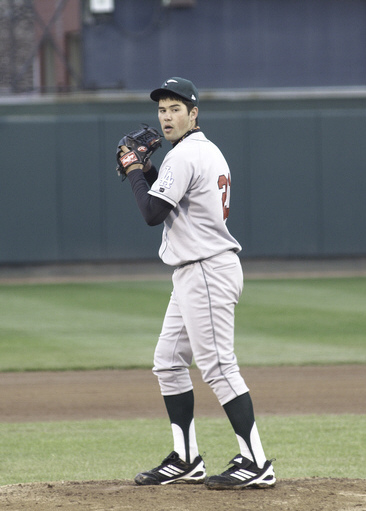
Zach Lee was the Dodgers' first-round pick in 2010.

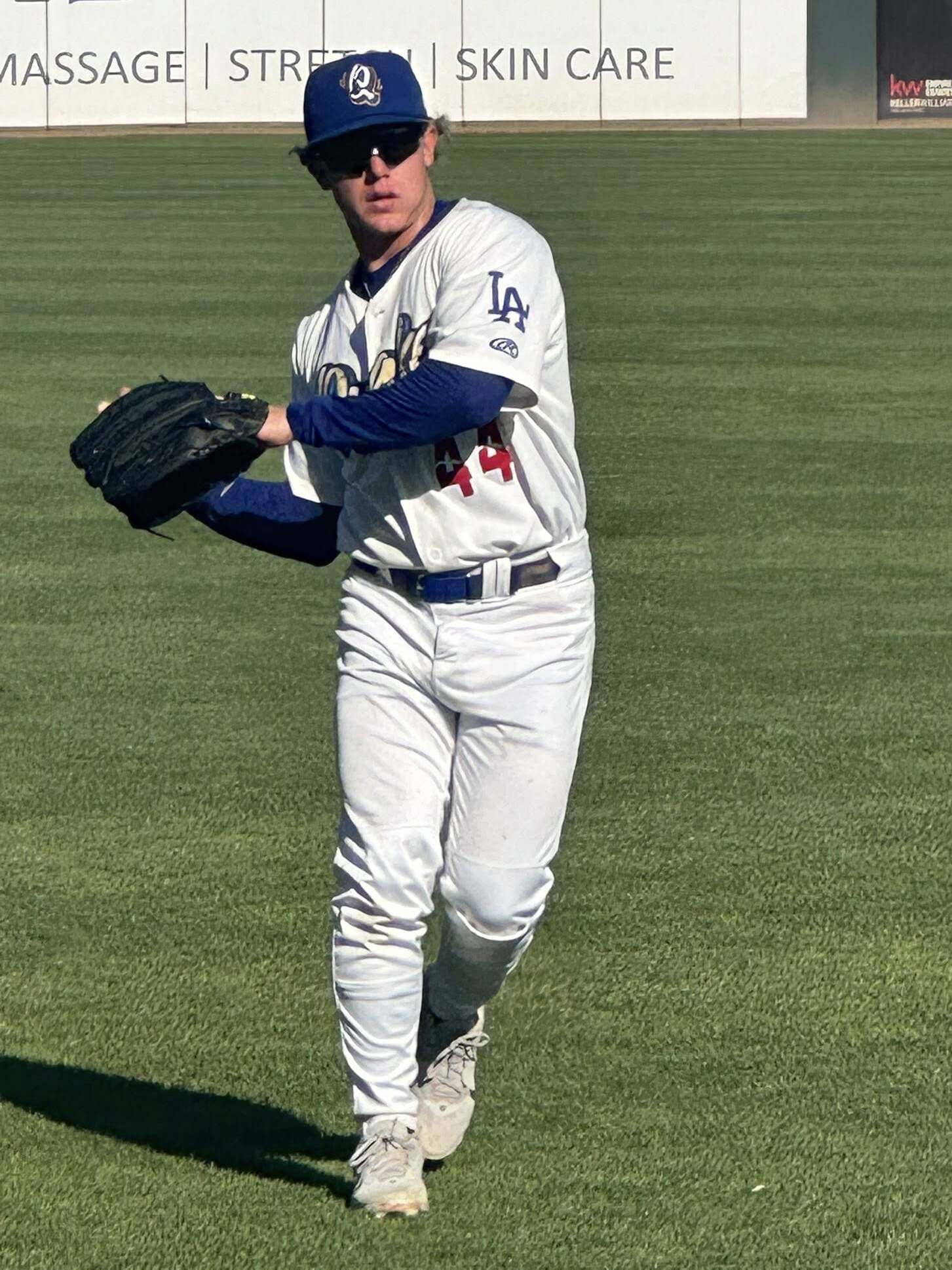
Charles Davalan was the second of two Arkansas Razorbacks teammates the Dodgers selected with consecutive picks in 2025.

Year	Name	Position	School (Location)	Pick	Ref
1965	John Wyatt	Shortstop	Bakersfield High School (Bakersfield, California)	8	
1966	Larry Hutton	Right-handed pitcher	Greenfield High School (Greenfield, Indiana)	19	
1967	Don Denbow	Third baseman	Southern Methodist University (University Park, Texas)	20	
1968	Bobby Valentine	Outfielder	Rippowam High School (Stamford, Connecticut)	5	
1969	Terry McDermott	Catcher	St. Agnes High School (Queens, New York)	8	
1970	Jim Haller	Right-handed pitcher	Creighton Preparatory School (Omaha, Nebraska)	9	
1971	Rick Rhoden	Right-handed pitcher	Atlantic High School (Delray Beach, Florida)	20	
1972	John Harbin	Shortstop	Newberry College (Newberry, South Carolina)	17	
1973	Ted Farr	Catcher	Shadle Park High School (Spokane, Washington)	18	
1974	Rick Sutcliffe	Right-handed pitcher	Van Horn High School (Independence, Missouri)	21	
1975	Mark Bradley	Shortstop	Elizabethtown High School (Elizabethtown, Kentucky)	24	
1976	Mike Scioscia '81, '88	Catcher	Springfield High School (Springfield, Pennsylvania)	19	
1977	Bob Welch '81	Right-handed pitcher	Eastern Michigan University (Ypsilanti, Michigan)	20	
1978	no first-round pick^{[a]}				
1979	Steve Howe '81	Left-handed pitcher	University of Michigan (Ann Arbor, Michigan)	16^{[b]}	
1979	Steve Perry	Right-handed pitcher	University of Michigan (Ann Arbor, Michigan)	25^{[c]}	
1980	Ross Jones	Shortstop	University of Miami (Coral Gables, Florida)	9	
1981	Dave Anderson '88	Shortstop	Memphis State University (Memphis, Tennessee)	22	
1982	Franklin Stubbs '88	First baseman	Virginia Polytechnic Institute and State University (Blacksburg, Virginia)	19	
1983	Erik Sonberg	Left-handed pitcher	Wichita State University (Wichita, Kansas)	18	
1984	Dennis Livingston	Left-handed pitcher	Oklahoma State University–Stillwater (Stillwater, Oklahoma)	23	
1985	Chris Gwynn	Outfielder	San Diego State University (San Diego, California)	10	
1986	Mike White	Outfielder	Loudon High School (Loudon, Tennessee)	19	
1987	Dan Opperman	Right-handed pitcher	Valley High School (Las Vegas, Nevada)	8	
1988	Bill Bene	Right-fielder pitcher	California State University, Los Angeles (Los Angeles, California)	5	
1989	Kiki Jones	Right-handed pitcher	Hillsborough High School (Tampa, Florida)	15^{[d]}	
1989	Tom Goodwin	Outfielder	California State University, Fresno (Fresno, California)	22	
1989	Jamie McAndrew	Right-handed pitcher	University of Florida (Gainesville, Florida)	28^{§}^{[e]}	
1990	Ronnie Walden	Left-handed pitcher	Blanchard High School (Blanchard, Oklahoma)	9	
1991	no first-round pick^{[f]}				
1992	Ryan Luzinski	Catcher	Holy Cross High School (Delran, New Jersey)	32^{§}^{[g]}	
1992	Michael Moore	Outfielder	University of California, Los Angeles (Los Angeles, California)	36^{§}^{[h]}	
1993	Darren Dreifort	Right-handed pitcher	Wichita State University (Wichita, Kansas)	2	
1994	Paul Konerko	Catcher	Chaparral High School (Scottsdale, Arizona)	13	
1995	David Yocum	Left-handed pitcher	Florida State University (Tallahassee, Florida)	20	
1996	Damian Rolls	Third baseman	Schlagel High School (Kansas City, Kansas)	23	
1997	Glenn Davis	First baseman	Vanderbilt University (Nashville, Tennessee)	25	
1998	Bubba Crosby	Outfielder	Rice University (Houston, Texas)	23	
1999	Jason Repko	Shortstop	Hanford High School (Richland, Washington)	37^{§}^{[i]}	
2000	Ben Diggins	Right-handed pitcher	University of Arizona (Tucson, Arizona)	17	
2001	no first-round pick^{[j]}				
2002	James Loney	First baseman	Lawrence E. Elkins High School (Missouri City, Texas)	19	
2002	Greg Miller	Left-handed pitcher	Esperanza High School (Yorba Linda, California)	31^{§}^{[k]}	
2003	Chad Billingsley	Right-handed pitcher	Defiance Senior High School (Defiance, Ohio)	24	
2004	Scott Elbert	Left-handed pitcher	Seneca High School (Seneca, Missouri)	24	
2004	Blake DeWitt	Second baseman	Sikeston High School (Sikeston, Missouri)	28^{[l]}	
2004	Justin Orenduff	Right-handed pitcher	Virginia Commonwealth University (Richmond, Virginia)	33^{§}^{[m]}	
2005	Luke Hochevar*	Right-handed pitcher	University of Tennessee (Knoxville, Tennessee)	40^{§}^{[n]}	
2006	Clayton Kershaw '20, '25	Left-handed pitcher	Highland Park High School (Highland Park, Texas)	7	
2006	Bryan Morris	Right-handed pitcher	Motlow State Community College (Lynchburg, Tennessee)	26^{[o]}	
2006	Preston Mattingly	Shortstop	Evansville Central High School (Evansville, Indiana)	31^{§}^{[p]}	
2007	Chris Withrow	Right-handed pitcher	Midland High School (Midland, Texas)	20^{[q]}	
2007	James Adkins	Left-handed pitcher	University of Tennessee (Knoxville, Tennessee)	39^{§}^{[r]}	
2008	Ethan Martin	Right-handed pitcher	Stephens County School High School (Toccoa, Georgia)	15	
2009	Aaron Miller	Left-handed pitcher	Baylor University (Waco, Texas)	36^{§}^{[s]}	
2010	Zach Lee	Right-handed pitcher	McKinney High School (McKinney, Texas)	28	
2011	Chris Reed	Left-handed pitcher	Stanford University (Stanford, California)	16	
2012	Corey Seager '20	Shortstop	Northwest Cabarrus High School (Kannapolis, North Carolina)	18	
2012	Jesmuel Valentin	Shortstop	Puerto Rico Baseball Academy and High School; Puerto Rico	51^{§}^{[t]}	
2013	Chris Anderson	Right-handed pitcher	Jacksonville University (Jacksonville, Florida)	18	
2014	Grant Holmes	Right-handed pitcher	Conway High School (Conway, South Carolina)	22	
2015	Walker Buehler '20, '24	Right-handed pitcher	Vanderbilt University (Nashville, Tennessee)	24	
2015	Kyle Funkhouser *	Right-handed pitcher	University of Louisville (Louisville, Kentucky)	35^{§}^{[u]}	
2016	Gavin Lux '24	Shortstop	Indian Trail High School and Academy (Kenosha, Wisconsin)	20	
2016	Will Smith '20, '24, '25	Catcher	University of Louisville (Louisville, Kentucky)	32^{§}^{[v]}	
2016	Jordan Sheffield	Right-handed pitcher	Vanderbilt University (Nashville, Tennessee)	36^{§}^{[w]}	
2017	Jeren Kendall	Outfielder	Vanderbilt University (Nashville, Tennessee)	23	
2018	J. T. Ginn *	Right-handed Pitcher	Brandon High School (Brandon, Mississippi)	30	
2019	Kody Hoese	Third baseman	Tulane University (New Orleans, Louisiana)	25	
2019	Michael Busch	Second baseman	University of North Carolina (Chapel Hill, North Carolina)	31^{§}^{[x]}	
2020	Bobby Miller	Right-handed Pitcher	University of Louisville (Louisville, Kentucky)	29	
2021	Maddux Bruns	Left-handed Pitcher	UMS-Wright Preparatory School (Mobile, Alabama)	29	
2022	no first-round pick^{[y]}				
2023	Kendall George	Outfielder	Atascocita High School (Harris County, Texas)	36 ^{[z]}	
2024	Kellon Lindsey	Shortstop	Hardee High School (Wauchula, Florida)	23	
2025	Zach Root	Left-handed Pitcher	University of Arkansas (Fayetteville, Arkansas)	40^{§}^{[aa]}	
2025	Charles Davalan	Outfielder	University of Arkansas (Fayetteville, Arkansas)	41^{§}^{[aa]}	
2026	Bo Lowrance	Third baseman	Christ Church Episcopal School (Greenville, South Carolina)	40^{[bb]}	

== See also ==
- Los Angeles Dodgers minor league players

== Footnotes ==
- ^{V} Through the 2012 draft, free agents were evaluated by the Elias Sports Bureau and rated "Type A", "Type B", or not compensation-eligible. If a team offered arbitration to a player but that player refused and subsequently signed with another team, the original team was able to receive additional draft picks. If a "Type A" free agent left in this way, his previous team received a supplemental pick and a compensatory pick from the team with which he signed. If a "Type B" free agent left in this way, his previous team received only a supplemental pick. Since the 2013 draft, free agents are no longer classified by type; instead, compensatory picks are only awarded if the team offered its free agent a contract worth at least the average of the 125 current richest MLB contracts. However, if the free agent's last team acquired the player in a trade during the last year of his contract, it is ineligible to receive compensatory picks for that player.
- ^{a} The Dodgers lost their first-round pick in 1978 to the Pittsburgh Pirates as compensation for signing free agent Terry Forster.
- ^{b} The Dodgers gained a compensatory first-round pick in 1979 from the Pittsburgh Pirates for losing free agent Lee Lacy.
- ^{c} The Dodgers gained a compensatory first-round pick in 1979 from the New York Yankees for losing free agent Tommy John.
- ^{d} The Dodgers gained a compensatory first-round pick in 1989 from the New York Yankees for losing free agent Steve Sax.
- ^{e} The Dodgers gained a supplemental pick in 1989 for losing free agent Steve Sax.
- ^{f} The Dodgers lost their first-round pick in 1991 to the New York Mets as compensation for signing free agent Darryl Strawberry.
- ^{g} The Dodgers lost their original first-round pick in 1992 to the Toronto Blue Jays as compensation for signing free agent Tom Candiotti but gained a supplemental pick for losing free agent Eddie Murray.
- ^{h} The Dodgers gained a supplemental pick in 1992 for losing free agent Mike Morgan.
- ^{i} The Dodgers gained a supplemental pick in 1999 for losing free agent Scott Radinsky.
- ^{j} The Dodgers lost their first-round pick in 2001 to the Atlanta Braves as compensation for signing free agent Andy Ashby.
- ^{k} The Dodgers gained a supplemental pick in 2002 for losing free agent Chan Ho Park.
- ^{l} The Dodgers gained a compensatory first-round pick in 2004 from the New York Yankees for losing free agent Paul Quantrill.
- ^{m} The Dodgers gained a supplemental pick in 2004 for losing free agent Paul Quantrill.
- ^{n} The Dodgers lost their original first-round pick in 2005 to the Boston Red Sox as compensation for signing free agent Derek Lowe but gained a supplemental pick for losing free agent Adrián Beltré.
- ^{o} The Dodgers gained a compensatory first-round pick in 2006 from the Los Angeles Angels of Anaheim for losing free agent Jeff Weaver.
- ^{p} The Dodgers gained a supplemental pick in 2006 for losing free agent Jeff Weaver.
- ^{q} The Dodgers gained a compensatory first-round pick in 2007 from the Boston Red Sox for losing free agent Julio Lugo.
- ^{r} The Dodgers gained a supplemental pick in 2007 for losing free agent Julio Lugo.
- ^{s} The Dodgers gained a supplemental pick in 2009 for losing free agent Derek Lowe.
- ^{t} The Dodgers gained a supplemental pick in 2012 for losing free agent Rod Barajas.
- ^{u} The Dodgers gained a compensatory first-round pick in 2015 from the Boston Red Sox for losing free agent Hanley Ramírez.
- ^{v} The Dodgers gained a compensatory first-round pick in 2016 from the Arizona Diamondbacks for losing free agent Zack Greinke.
- ^{w} The Dodgers gained a compensatory first-round pick in 2016 for failing to sign Kyle Funkhouser in the 2015 draft.
- ^{x} The Dodgers gained a compensatory first-round pick in 2019 for failing to sign J. T. Ginn in the 2018 draft.
- ^{y} The Dodgers did not have a first round pick in 2022 as a result of going over the competitive balance tax during the 2021 season
- ^{z} The Dodgers first round pick was dropped 10 spots as a result of going over the competitive balance tax during the 2022 season, so it actually was during the competitive balance section of the draft.
- ^{aa} The Dodgers first round pick was dropped 10 spots as a result of going over the competitive balance tax during the 2024 season, so it actually was during the competitive balance section of the draft.
- ^{bb} The Dodgers’ first overall pick was dropped 10 places to No. 40 because they exceeded the second surcharge threshold of the Competitive Balance Tax.
