= Springfield School District (Delaware County) =

School district in Pennsylvania

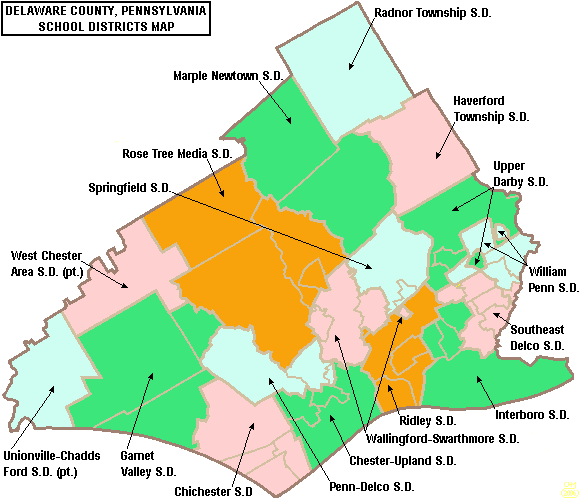
- Map of Delaware County, Pennsylvania school districts

Address
- 200 South Rolling Road Springfield Township, Delaware County, Pennsylvania, 19064-2396; United States
- Coordinates: 39.927674°N 75.337801°W

District information
- Type: Public
- Grades: K–12
- NCES District ID: 4222600

Students and staff
- Students: 4,359 (2021–2022)
- Teachers: 274 (on an FTE basis)
- Staff: 185 (on an FTE basis)
- Student–teacher ratio: 15.9:1

Other information
- Website: www.ssdcougars.org

Springfield School District (SSD) is a midsized, suburban, (K–12) public school district located in Springfield Township, Delaware County, Pennsylvania. It also serves the neighboring Morton Borough. The district is one of the 500 public school districts of Pennsylvania. Springfield School District encompasses 7 square miles (18 km^{2}).

According to 2018–22 ACS-ED data, the district serves a resident population of 27,702. The median household income is $124,889, versus a state median income of $73,170, and national median income of $75,149. The educational attainment levels for the Springfield School District population are 59.1% Bachelor's degree or higher. In the 2010 census, the percent of families in poverty was 3.0; the percent of all people in poverty was 3.9; the percent of people under 18 years in poverty was 6.0.

Springfield School District operates two elementary schools (2–5): Scenic Hills Elementary School and Harvey C. Sabold Elementary School. Junior high students (6–8) attend E.T. Richardson Middle School, and high school students (9–12) attend Springfield High School. Students in K–1 attend the Springfield Literacy Center that opened for the 2010 school year. The district's administration office is connected to the high school building.

Springfield High School students may choose to attend Delaware County Technical High School for training in the construction and mechanical trades. The Delaware County Intermediate Unit IU25 provides the district with a wide variety of services like specialized education for disabled students and hearing, speech and visual disability services and professional development for staff and faculty.

== History ==
Families in Springfield Township could choose to send their children to Swarthmore High School, Lansdowne High School, and/or Media High School prior to the 1931 establishment of Springfield High School.

== Extracurriculars ==
Springfield School District offers a wide variety of clubs, activities and an extensive, publicly funded sports program.

=== Athletics ===
The Springfield Cougars compete in many varsity and Junior varsity sports each participating in the Central League.

Varsity

Boys

- Baseball - AAAA
- Basketball- AAAAA
- Cross country - AAA
- Football - AAAAA
- Golf - AAA
- Indoor track and field - AAAA
- Lacrosse - AAAA
- Soccer - AAA
- Swimming and diving - AAA
- Tennis - AAA
- Track and field - AAA
- Wrestling - AAA

Girls

- Basketball - AAAA
- Cross country - AAA
- Indoor track and field - AAAA
- Field hockey - AAA
- Lacrosse - AAAA
- Soccer - AAA
- Softball - AAAA
- Swimming and diving - AAA
- Tennis - AAA
- Track and field - AAA
- Volleyball - AAA
- Cheerleading

Middle school sports

Boys

- Baseball
- Basketball
- Football
- Lacrosse
- Soccer
- Track and field
- Wrestling

Girls

- Basketball
- Field hockey
- Lacrosse
- Soccer
- Softball
- Track and field
- Volleyball

=== Football ===
The Springfield Cougars Football Program, which started in 1932, has seen nine Central league championships in 1962, 1963, 1989, 1994, 2014, 2016, 2017, 2023, and 2024. The 2014-15 Cougar Football Season was the most successful team in high school history. The Cougars played their last home football game in 2018 against Unionville High School, to make way for a new turf field to be installed along with the new high school project, the Cougars football team played their home games at Strath Haven High School in Wallingford as their temporary site for the 2019 season.

==== Lacrosse ====
Springfield High School is also well known for their boys' lacrosse team. In the last few seasons the boys finished each season except for 2007–08 season at .500, with 10 wins or more. Springfield won the district 1 championship for lacrosse in 2015. On June 13 the 2016 boys lacrosse team defeated La Salle, 4–3 to win the PIAA State Championship.

=== Music programs ===
The high school has a band orchestra and choir.

=== Academics ===
The high school and middle school have one of the best Pennsylvania Junior Academy of Science teams in the state. The current era of the team started in the 2006–2007 school year. Since then the team has grown to 32 members in the 2010–2011 school year. Approximately 85-90% of the students qualify for the state meet each year. This is much higher than the normal qualification rate of 65-70%. Students from Springfield have placed extremely well and students have won scholarships. The team has also accumulated over $100,000 in prizes and scholarships.

=== Steve Stefani Dance Marathon ===
Steve Stefani Dance Marathon is an annual charity event held at Springfield High School each year; proceeds go to the Four Diamonds Fund to go towards fighting pediatric cancer for kids across Pennsylvania. Steve Stefani Dance Marathon was originally created by a teacher who works at Springfield High School to honor Steve Stefani, a beloved social studies teacher who worked at Sabold Elementary and Springfield High School, and died of cancer. In 2013 participants raised over $190,000 to go towards fighting pediatric cancer. In 2014 the Steve Stefani Dance Marathon raised $224,598,71 to go towards fighting pediatric cancer. To date the Steve Stefani Raised over $1 million in 11 years. In 2018 the participants raised $244,750,57.

=== Turkey Games ===
The Turkey Games is an annual flag football tournament that began in 2015, that is held every 3rd Wednesday before Thanksgiving. The proceeds go to the Turkey fund for the homeless, and needy. In 2018 those who were involved were encouraged to donate winter clothing such is gloves, hats, and coats.

=== Brunner Bash ===
The Brunner Bash is a six-hour marathon similar to the Steve Stefani Dance Marathon that honors Sabold teacher Glen Brunner, who died of cancer. The bash occurs every year and students may not sit and be physically active for six hours at the middle school. The proceeds support the Steve Stefani Dance Marathon.

== Future development ==
On June 10, 2015, Springfield School Board voted in an 8–1 decision to build a new high school. The construction of the new high school began in 2018 and was completed in early 2021. The old high school was demolished, to way for new playing fields and installation of the visiting teams bleachers which concluded in 2022.

== Notable alumni ==
- Robert Hazard, rock musician
- Mike Scioscia, Major League Baseball player and manager
- Daniel Archibong (American football), National Football League player
- Andre Petroski, Ultimate Fighting Championship fighter
- Geoff Petrie, National Basketball Association player
