= Greg Smith (infielder) =

American baseball player (born 1967)

- Infielder
- Born: April 5, 1967 (age 59); Baltimore, Maryland, U.S.
- Batted: Switch Threw: Right

MLB debut
- September 2, 1989, for the Chicago Cubs

Last MLB appearance
- May 24, 1991, for the Los Angeles Dodgers

MLB statistics
- Batting average: .212
- Home runs: 0
- Runs batted in: 7
- Stats at Baseball Reference

Teams
- Chicago Cubs (1989–1990); Los Angeles Dodgers (1991)

Gregory Alan Smith (born April 5, 1967) is an American former Major League Baseball infielder and current scout. He played for the Chicago Cubs and the Los Angeles Dodgers from 1989 through 1991.

== Early life and education ==
Smith graduated from Glenelg High School in Howard County, Maryland in 1985.

== Baseball career ==
A switch-hitter, Smith was drafted by the Chicago Cubs in the 2nd round of the 1985 MLB amateur draft. He was signed on June 10, 1985.

In his first season in the minor leagues, Smith played shortstop in 51 games for the Cubs' Wytheville minor league team, hitting .235. In 1986, he was promoted to the Cubs' Peoria A-level minor league team, where Smith played shortstop and second base and hit .253 in 53 games. Smith returned to Peoria the following year, where he hit .270 in 124 games and again played shortstop and second base.

In 1988, Smith played second base and hit .280 in 95 games for the Cubs Winston-Salem minor league team.

In 1989, Smith played for the Cubs' AA Charlotte minor-league team, hitting .296 in 126 games. The Cubs promoted Smith to the major leagues in September 1989, and Smith made his Major League Baseball debut on September 2, 1989. Smith played in four games in September 1989, going two for five.

In 1990, the Cubs invited Smith to their training camp as a nonroster player. He made the club in April and hit .205 in 18 games, playing both shortstop and second base. After making three errors in nine games, the Cubs announced on April 30, 1990, that Smith was being sent down to the minors, where he hit .291 in 105 games for the Cubs AAA Iowa minor league team. On September 4, 1990, Smith was called back up to the Cubs for the remainder of the 1990 season, along with Dave Pavlas and Derrick May.

On December 14, 1990, the Cubs traded Smith to the Los Angeles Dodgers for José Vizcaíno. "He is hard-nosed, he is a battler, he runs well...everybody we talk to likes him a lot", the Dodgers' executive Fred Claire told the Chicago Tribune immediately after the trade, in an article that was published on December 15, 1990.

Smith started the 1991 season with the Dodgers. He was later sent down to the Dodgers' AAA Albuquerque minor league team on April 8, 1991. He was recalled to the Dodgers in mid-May 1991 to replace injured utility infielder Mike Sharperson, and was sent down again on May 24, 1991. His final major-league game was on that day, May 24, 1991.

The rest of the 1991 season was a disappointment for Smith in the minors. He missed some playing time with an injured right thumb, and wound up hitting just .217 in 48 games at Albuquerque.

On March 24, 1992, the Dodgers waived Smith. He refused an assignment to Albuquerque and instead became a free agent. He wound up signing with the Detroit Tigers organization, and played in 1992 for the Tigers' Toledo Mud Hens AAA minor league team. With Toledo, Smith hit .234 in 128 games.

He returned to the Chicago Cubs organization in 1993, hitting .282 in 131 games for the AAA Iowa Cubs minor league team. However, the Chicago Cubs declined to promote him to the major-league roster.

In 1994, Smith joined the Milwaukee Brewers organization, spending the entire season playing shortstop and second base for the team's AAA New Orleans Zephyrs minor league team, hitting .231 in 115 games.

== Post-playing career ==
He became a scout for the Kansas City Royals, covering the Pacific Northwest between 1997 and 2006. He then was a Cleveland Indians scout from 2007 until 2009 and then worked for the Texas Rangers as a major league scout from 2009 until early 2012. In early 2012, Smith became a special assistant to the Texas Rangers' general manager.

Smith lives in eastern Washington.
