= Bob Gibson (1980s pitcher) =

American baseball player (born 1957)

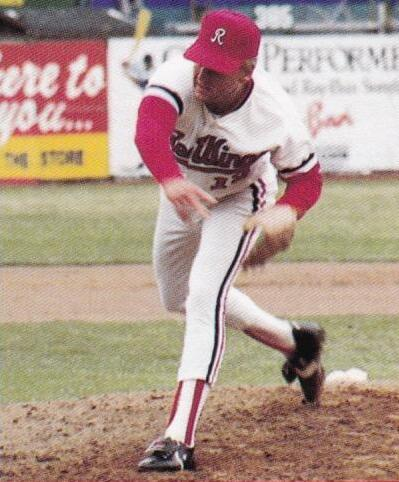
- Gibson with the Rochester Red Wings c. 1988
- Pitcher
- Born: June 19, 1957 (age 68); Philadelphia, Pennsylvania, U.S.
- Batted: Right Threw: Right

MLB debut
- April 13, 1983, for the Milwaukee Brewers

Last MLB appearance
- July 25, 1987, for the New York Mets

MLB statistics
- Win–loss record: 12–18
- Earned run average: 4.24
- Strikeouts: 166

NPB statistics
- Win–loss record: 7–11
- Earned run average: 4.87
- Strikeouts: 80
- Stats at Baseball Reference

Teams
- Milwaukee Brewers (1983–1986); New York Mets (1987); Yakult Swallows (1988)

Robert Louis Gibson (born June 19, 1957) is an American former professional baseball player who pitched in the Major Leagues from 1983–1987 for the Milwaukee Brewers and New York Mets.

Gibson attended and played baseball at Springfield High School in Delaware County, Pennsylvania, where his catcher was Mike Scioscia. He did not receive any scholarship offers to play college baseball so instead chose to played baseball where he could afford it, at Bloomsburg University of Pennsylvania. He was undrafted out of college but signed by Milwaukee Brewers scout Joe McIlvaine after his senior year.

He also played in Japan at the end of his career.
