= Daniel Archibong (American football) =

American football player (born 1997)

No. 72, 61, 96
- Position: Defensive end

Personal information
- Born: September 12, 1997 (age 29); Springfield Township, Pennsylvania
- Listed height: 6 ft 6 in (1.98 m)
- Listed weight: 307 lb (139 kg)

Career information
- High school: Springfield
- College: Temple
- NFL draft: 2021: undrafted

Career history
- Chicago Bears (2021)*; Pittsburgh Steelers (2021)
- * Offseason or practice squad member only

Career NFL statistics
- Total tackles: 2
- Stats at Pro Football Reference

Daniel Archibong (born September 12, 1997) is an American former professional football player who was a defensive end in the National Football League (NFL). He played college football for the Temple Owls.

== College career ==
Archibong was a member of the Temple Owls for five seasons. He played two games as a true freshman before deciding to redshirt the rest of the season. Archibong finished his collegiate career with 89 tackles, 10.5 tackles for loss, 6.0 sacks and eight passes broken up in 48 games played.

== Professional career ==
=== Chicago Bears ===
Archibong was signed by the Chicago Bears as an undrafted free agent on May 1, 2021. He was waived on August 31, 2021, at the end of training camp.

=== Pittsburgh Steelers ===
Archibong was signed to the Pittsburgh Steelers' practice squad on September 1, 2021. He was elevated to the active roster on November 21, 2021, for the team's Week 11 game against the Los Angeles Chargers and made his NFL debut in the game. He was elevated once again to the active roster from the practice squad on November 27, 2021. He signed a reserve/future contract with the Steelers on January 18, 2022. On July 11, 2022, the Steelers placed Archibong on the reserve/retired list.
