= Mike Christopher (baseball) =

American baseball player (born 1963)

- Pitcher
- Born: November 3, 1963 (age 62); Petersburg, Virginia, U.S.
- Batted: Right Threw: Right

MLB debut
- September 10, 1991, for the Los Angeles Dodgers

Last MLB appearance
- May 11, 1996, for the Detroit Tigers

MLB statistics
- Win–loss record: 5–1
- Earned run average: 4.90
- Strikeouts: 76
- Stats at Baseball Reference

Teams
- Los Angeles Dodgers (1991); Cleveland Indians (1992–1993); Detroit Tigers (1995–1996)

Michael Wayne Christopher (born November 3, 1963) is an American former Major League Baseball right-handed pitcher. He played college baseball for the East Carolina Pirates.

Drafted by the New York Yankees in the 7th round of the 1985 Major League Baseball draft, Christopher would make his Major League Baseball debut with the Los Angeles Dodgers on September 10, 1991, and appear in his final game on May 11, 1996. He was a replacement player for the Tigers in 1995 during the players' strike.

One of the highlights of Christopher's career came on September 5, 1995. He pitched 4 innings of shutout baseball to hold down a 6–4 Tigers victory over the Twins and save the game for starting pitcher C.J. Nitkowski. It was the only save of Christopher's major league career.
