= Springfield High School (Pennsylvania) =

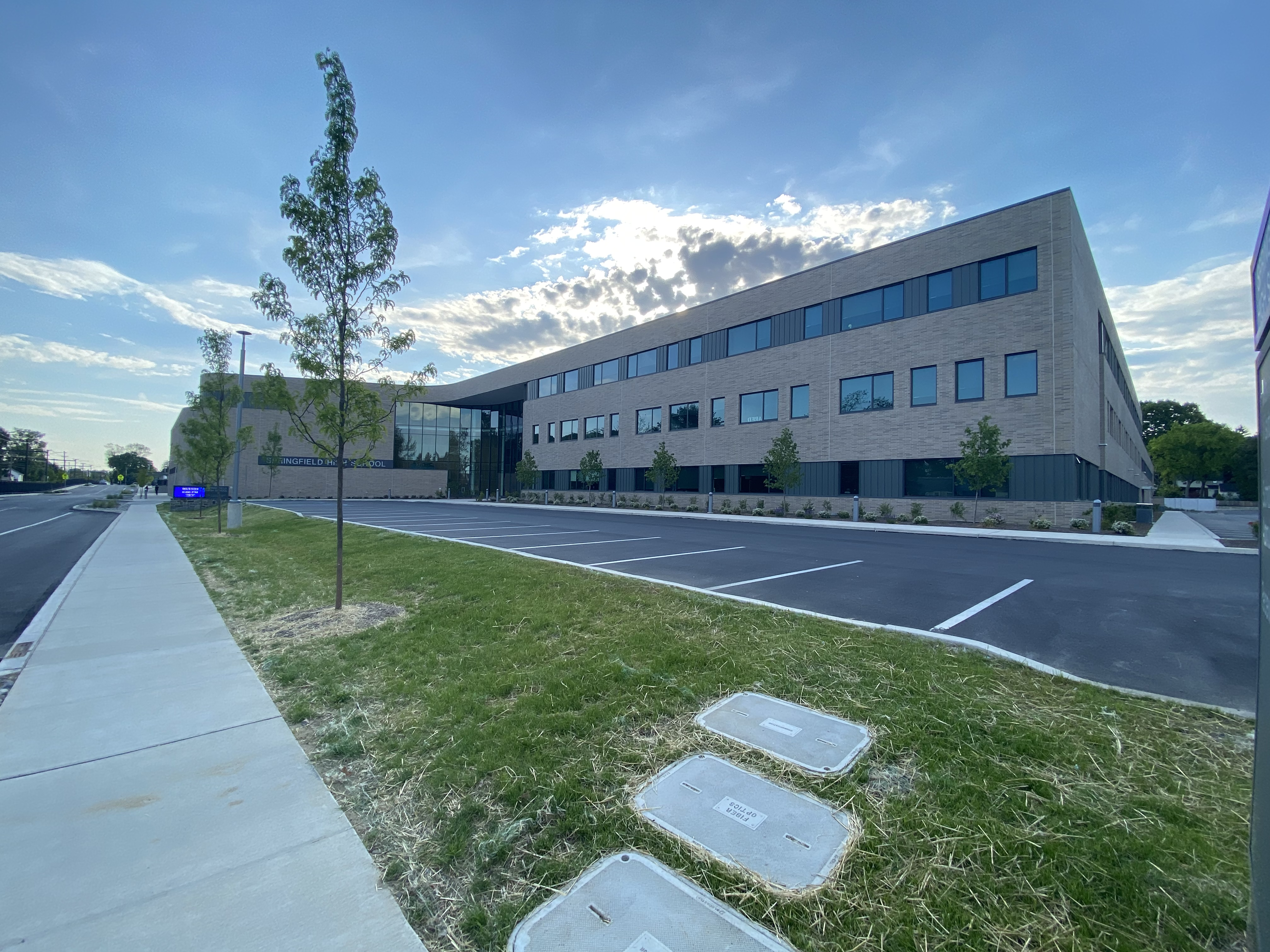

Location
- 200 South Rolling Road; Springfield, Pennsylvania, U.S.
- 39.9280°N 75.3383°W

Information
- Type: Public high school
- Motto: "We Believe that Every Child Can Read" (at grade level or higher)
- Established: 1932
- School district: Springfield School District
- Principal: Joseph Hepp
- Faculty: ~150 staff members
- Teaching staff: 82.00 (FTE)
- Grades: 9-12
- Enrollment: 1,375 (2022-2023)
- Student to teacher ratio: 16.77
- Colors: Blue; Gold
- Mascot: Cougar
- Yearbook: "Scrivener"

Springfield High School is a public high school in Springfield Township, Delaware County, Pennsylvania, in the Philadelphia metropolitan area. It is a part of the Springfield School District. In addition to Springfield Township, its attendance zone includes the borough of Morton.

== History ==
Prior to the school's establishment, Springfield families could choose to send their children to Lansdowne High School, Media High School, or Swarthmore High School. Springfield High was established in 1931. The building originally had 13 classrooms. Harvey Sabold was the first principal.

Earl R. Knorr became the principal in 1970. Knorr retired in 1990.

On March 11, 1977, a fire destroyed the original 1931 building, which included 12 ninth grade classrooms, two gyms, two art rooms, a little theater and some administrative offices.

Beginning in 2009, planning began for a new high school with fewer than 250,000 square feet (23,000 m^{2}) of space.. In 2015, the school board voted to build a new facility, with eight in favor and one, Bruce Lord, against. The former baseball field was chosen as the site of the new building. Construction began in 2018. The previous main gymnasium and stadium were dismantled as part of the process. By summer 2019, the school's steel structure had been established. As of 2018 the estimated cost was $130 million.

The new high school was completed in late 2020, and opened in 2021.

== Campus ==
The Frances "Chickie" Giuffre Dining Center Complex and Katherine G. “Kay” Voglesong Bus Driver Commons Room in the new building are named after former employees. Giuffre's son Nicholas Giuffre gave the Springfield Area Education Foundation $1 million, and the cafeteria and bus driver room were in turn named after his mother and his mother-in-law. The son was a member of the Class of 1974.

In the old campus, Knorr is the namesake of the theater.

== Culture ==
The "Festival of the Arts" was established by Knorr.

== Notable alumni ==
- Taylor Buchholz, Class of 2001, professional baseball pitcher
- Bob Gibson, Class of 1975, professional baseball pitcher
- Robert Hazard, Class of 1966, musician and songwriter
- Tom Keifer, guitarist and singer for the rock band Cinderella
- Ja'Den McKenzie, college football player for the Rhode Island Rams
- Frank Mentzer, Dungeons & Dragons designer
- Geoff Petrie, Class of 1966, NBA basketball player and executive
- Andre Petroski, Class of 2010, UFC fighter
- Mike Scioscia, Class of 1976, professional baseball player and manager
