= Terry Wells =

American baseball player (born 1963)

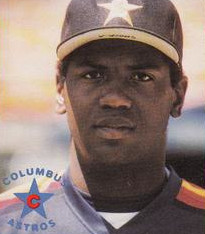
- Wells in 1988
- Pitcher
- Born: September 10, 1963 (age 62); Kankakee, Illinois, U.S.
- Batted: Left Threw: Left

MLB debut
- July 3, 1990, for the Los Angeles Dodgers

Last MLB appearance
- July 27, 1990, for the Los Angeles Dodgers

MLB statistics
- Record: 1-2
- Earned run average: 7.84
- Strikeouts: 18
- Stats at Baseball Reference

Teams
- Los Angeles Dodgers (1990)

Terry Wells (born September 10, 1963), is an American former Major League Baseball (MLB) pitcher who played for the Los Angeles Dodgers in 1990.

== Biography ==
A native of Kankakee, Illinois, Wells attended the University of Illinois at Urbana–Champaign, and in 1984 he played collegiate summer baseball with the Harwich Mariners of the Cape Cod Baseball League.

Wells was drafted by the Houston Astros in the 8th round of the 1985 Major League Baseball draft. He had been drafted twice before (by the Cleveland Indians in 1981 and Chicago White Sox in 1984) but did not sign a contract on either occasion.

Wells was best known for being traded on April 1, 1990, by the Astros to the Los Angeles Dodgers for Franklin Stubbs, who had been a member of the Dodgers 1988 World Series team. The trade took place just days prior to the start of the season.

That year, 1990, was the only season in which Wells appeared. He started 5 games for the Dodgers, compiling a 1–2 won-loss record with a high 7.84 earned run average. He was released at the conclusion of the 1990 season and did not sign with another Major League team.
