= Jim Neidlinger =

American baseball player (born 1964)

- Pitcher
- Born: September 24, 1964 (age 61); Vallejo, California, U.S.
- Batted: Switch Threw: Right

MLB debut
- August 1, 1990, for the Los Angeles Dodgers

Last MLB appearance
- September 29, 1990, for the Los Angeles Dodgers

MLB statistics
- Win–loss record: 5–3
- Earned run average: 3.28
- Strikeouts: 46
- Stats at Baseball Reference

Teams
- Los Angeles Dodgers (1990)

James Llewellyn Neidlinger (born September 24, 1964) is an American former Major League Baseball pitcher.

Neidlinger attended Napa High School. and signed as a free agent with the Pittsburgh Pirates in 1984. He made his major league debut on August 1, 1990, with the Los Angeles Dodgers, starting twelve games during that season.

In November 2019, Neidlinger was named head coach of the Saint Michael's College baseball team. Prior to this, he had spent a decade as an assistant coach at Middlebury College.
