= Franklin Stubbs =

American baseball player (born 1960)

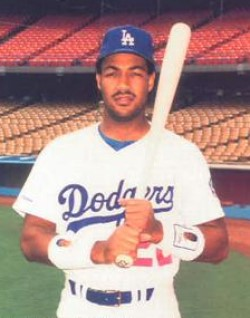
- Stubbs with the Los Angeles Dodgers in 1987
- First baseman / Outfielder
- Born: October 21, 1960 (age 65); Laurinburg, North Carolina, U.S.
- Batted: Left Threw: Left

MLB debut
- April 28, 1984, for the Los Angeles Dodgers

Last MLB appearance
- September 28, 1995, for the Detroit Tigers

MLB statistics
- Batting average: .232
- Home runs: 104
- Runs batted in: 348
- Stats at Baseball Reference

Teams
- Los Angeles Dodgers (1984–1989); Houston Astros (1990); Milwaukee Brewers (1991–1992); Detroit Tigers (1995)

Career highlights and awards
- World Series champion (1988)
Medals
Men's baseball
Representing the United States
World Games
Gold medal – first place	1981 Santa Clara	Team competition

Franklin Lee Stubbs (born October 21, 1960) is an American former professional baseball player who was in Major League Baseball (MLB) from 1984 to 1995. Stubbs played on four MLB teams in that time. His best season came in 1990 with the Houston Astros. Stubbs entered coaching after retiring as a player.

== Early life ==
Stubbs attended Richmond Senior High School in Rockingham, North Carolina. He was a member of three baseball conference championship teams while at Richmond Senior High and was inducted into the inaugural class of the Raider Athletic Hall of Fame in 2023.

== College career ==
Stubbs played college baseball at Virginia Tech through his junior season in 1982. In 1981, he was an All-American, hitting 29 home runs. His accomplishments earned him a place in the Virginia Tech Sports Hall of Fame.

== Professional career ==
=== Los Angeles Dodgers ===
Stubbs was drafted by the Los Angeles Dodgers in the 1st round of the 1982 MLB draft out of Virginia Tech. He played with the Albuquerque Dukes in the Pacific Coast League from 1983 to 1985.

Stubbs made his Major League debut as the starting first baseman for the Dodgers on April 28, 1984, against the San Diego Padres. He was 0 for 4 with 2 strikeouts in his debut. His first hit was a triple off Kent Tekulve of the Pittsburgh Pirates on May 5 and his first home run was off Charles Hudson of the Philadelphia Phillies on May 14.

Playing for the Dodgers in 1987, Stubbs had 885 total chances and made only 5 errors for a .994 fielding percentage, leading the National League. Stubbs was a member of the Dodgers team that won the 1988 World Series. He batted .294 with 2 doubles in the World Series.

He played with the Dodgers through 1989, hitting .227 with 59 home runs and 178 RBI in 542 games.

=== Houston Astros ===
Stubbs was traded on April 1, 1990, to the Houston Astros for 26-year-old rookie Terry Wells. The trade was made after Stubbs had spent the entire prior season as a backup, having lost his starting role to Eddie Murray. He had a career year as the Astros first baseman in 1990 with 23 home runs and 71 runs batted in.

=== Milwaukee Brewers ===
He signed as a free agent with the Milwaukee Brewers before the 1991 season. In 2 seasons in Milwaukee he hit .220 in 195 games.

=== Boston Red Sox ===
He signed as a free agent with the Montreal Expos on February 22, 1993, but was released at the end of spring training on March 29. He then signed a minor league contract with the Boston Red Sox on May 11. He spent the 1993 season in AAA with the Pawtucket Red Sox, hitting .237 in 94 games.

=== Mexican League ===
He spent the 1994 season in the Mexican League with the Leones de Yucatán and Charros de Jalisco.

=== Detroit Tigers ===
He signed a minor league contract with the Detroit Tigers on December 20, 1994, and made the Major League roster as a reserve outfielder and pinch hitter. In 62 games, he hit .250 for the Tigers. He retired as a player following the season.

=== Coaching ===
Stubbs joined the Atlanta Braves organization in 1997 as hitting coach for the Danville Braves in 1997 and the Danville 97s in 1998. He was the Braves minor league hitting coordinator from 1999 to 2002. After two more seasons as a roving hitting instructor for the Braves he returned to the dugout as a coach for the Myrtle Beach Pelicans from 2005 to 2006 and the Mississippi Braves from 2007 to 2008.

Stubbs left the Braves organization in 2009 to become the hitting coach for the Inland Empire 66ers of San Bernardino in the Dodgers organization in 2009–2010. He was promoted to the AA Chattanooga Lookouts in 2011-12 and became the hitting coach for the Albuquerque Isotopes, the Triple-A affiliate of the Dodgers in 2013. When the Dodgers moved their affiliate to the Oklahoma City Dodgers in 2015, Stubbs remained with the organization as the hitting coach. He was let go by the Dodgers after the 2015 season.

In 2016, Stubbs became the hitting coach for the Missoula Osprey, the Rookie League affiliate for the Arizona Diamondbacks. A year later, he was promoted to hitting coach of the Hillsboro Hops, the Arizona Diamondbacks Class A Advanced affiliate.
