= Kal Daniels =

American baseball player (born 1963)

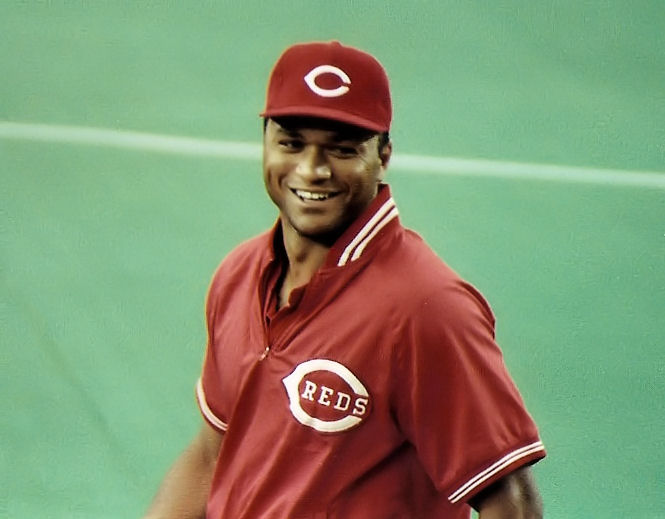
- Daniels in July 1988
- Left fielder
- Born: August 20, 1963 (age 62); Vienna, Georgia, U.S.
- Batted: Left Threw: Right

MLB debut
- April 9, 1986, for the Cincinnati Reds

Last MLB appearance
- September 22, 1992, for the Chicago Cubs

MLB statistics
- Batting average: .285
- Home runs: 104
- Runs batted in: 360
- Stats at Baseball Reference

Teams
- Cincinnati Reds (1986–1989); Los Angeles Dodgers (1989–1992); Chicago Cubs (1992)

Kalvoski Daniels (born August 20, 1963) is an American former professional baseball left fielder. He played seven seasons in Major League Baseball (MLB) from 1986 to 1992 for the Cincinnati Reds, Los Angeles Dodgers, and Chicago Cubs.

== Biography ==
Daniels was born on August 20, 1963, in Vienna, Georgia. He attended Northside High School in Warner Robins, Georgia, where he batted .500, and he eventually attended Middle Georgia College. Kal owned the single season home run record at Northside High School for 20 years. In 2000, Trea Brinson broke Kal's record.

Daniels was drafted by the New York Mets in the third round, 58th overall, of the 1982 amateur entry draft, January Regular Phase. He didn't sign then, but when he was drafted seventh overall by the Cincinnati Reds in the 1982 amateur entry draft, June Secondary Phase, he did.

In his first professional season, he hit .367 and stole 27 bases in 67 games. In 1982, Daniels was a Pioneer League All-Star.

In 1984, his third professional season, Daniels began developing power to go along with his good speed. In 122 games that year, he hit 17 home runs and stole 43 bases.

On April 9, 1986, Daniels made his big league debut at 22 years old. He had a successful rookie season, mostly being used off the bench-he hit .320 with 6 home runs and 15 stolen bases in 78 games (181 at-bats). In his second season, Daniels recorded a career high in home-runs per AB, hitting .334 with 26 home runs and 26 stolen bases in only 108 games.

He led the league in on-base percentage in 1988, with a .397 OBP. The Reds traded Daniels with Lenny Harris to the Dodgers for Tim Leary and Mariano Duncan on July 18, 1989. Daniels finished 27th in MVP voting in 1990. The Dodgers sent Daniels to the Cubs for a player to be named (minor leaguer Michael Sodders) on June 27, 1992.

Daniels, whose career was hampered by knee injuries, played his final game on September 22, 1992. He quietly retired from baseball during Chicago's final road trip of the season at age 29. He later said baseball had become "more of a business than a game." He attempted a comeback with the Toronto Blue Jays in 1996 but did not make it past spring training.

In 727 games over seven seasons, Daniels posted a .285 batting average (666-for-2338) with 391 runs, 125 doubles, 8 triples, 104 home runs, 360 RBI, 87 stolen bases, 365 bases on balls, .382 on-base percentage and .479 slugging percentage. He finished his career with a .980 fielding percentage playing primarily at left field and several games at first base.
