= José González (baseball) =

Dominican baseball player (born 1964)

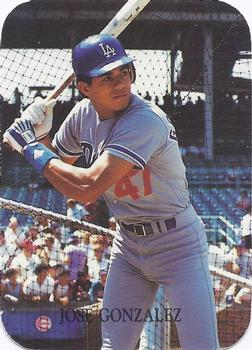
- Outfielder
- Born: November 23, 1964 (age 61); Puerto Plata, Dominican Republic
- Batted: Right Threw: Right

MLB debut
- September 2, 1985, for the Los Angeles Dodgers

Last MLB appearance
- July 30, 1992, for the California Angels

MLB statistics
- Batting average: .213
- Home runs: 9
- Runs batted in: 42

CPBL statistics
- Batting average: .200
- Home runs: 0
- Runs batted in: 2
- Stats at Baseball Reference

Teams
- Los Angeles Dodgers (1985–1991); Pittsburgh Pirates (1991); Cleveland Indians (1991); California Angels (1992); China Times Eagles (1995)

Career highlights and awards
- World Series champion (1988)

José Rafael González (born November 23, 1964) is a Dominican former professional baseball player who played eight seasons for the Los Angeles Dodgers, Pittsburgh Pirates, Cleveland Indians, and California Angels of Major League Baseball. He was a member of the 1988 Dodgers team that won the World Series, appearing in nine postseason games primarily as a defensive replacement and pinch runner.
