= Lenny Harris =

American baseball player (born 1964)

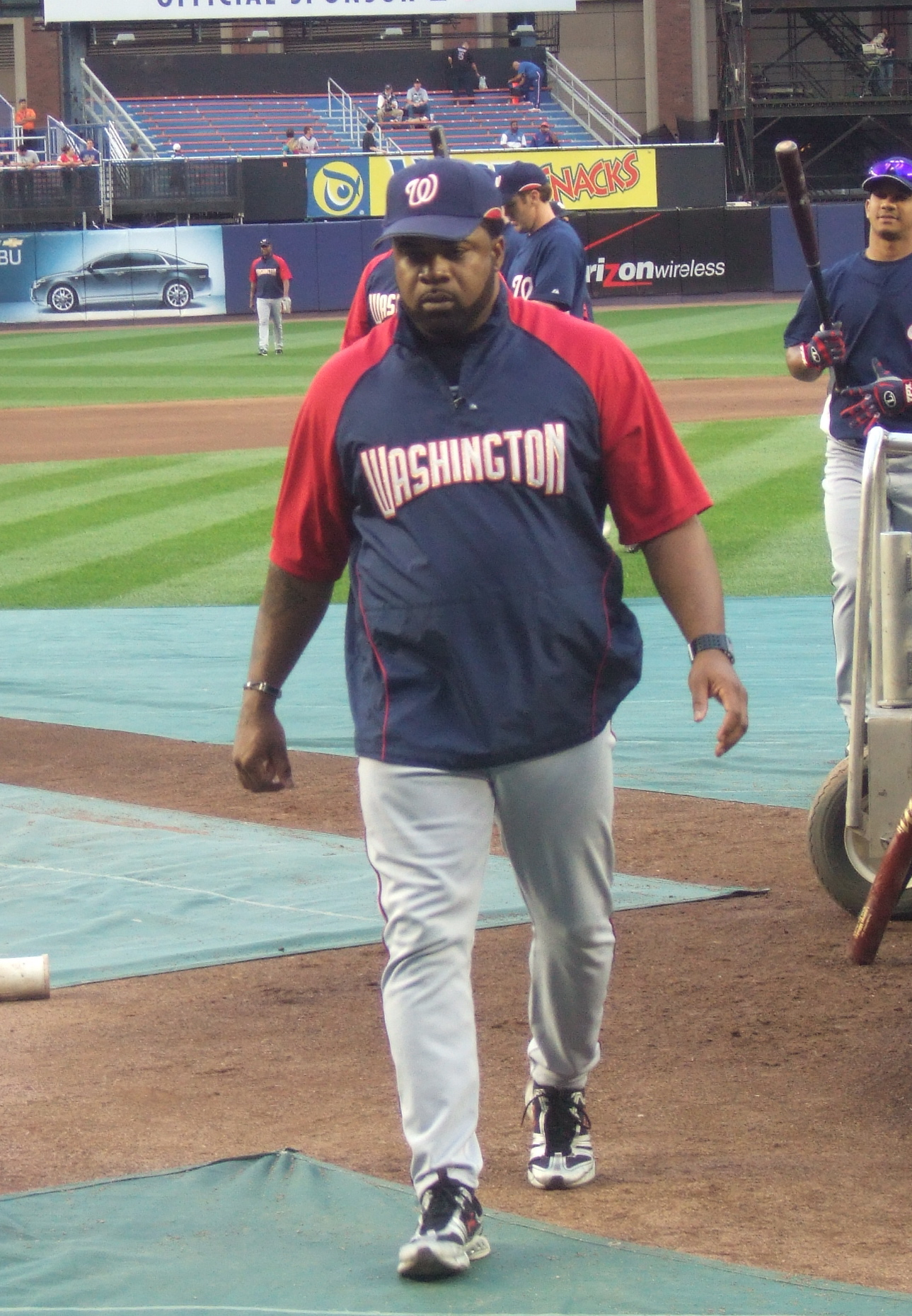
- Harris as Nationals hitting coach
- Third baseman / Outfielder / Second baseman
- Born: October 28, 1964 (age 61); Miami, Florida, U.S.
- Batted: Left Threw: Right

MLB debut
- September 7, 1988, for the Cincinnati Reds

Last MLB appearance
- October 1, 2005, for the Florida Marlins

MLB statistics
- Batting average: .269
- Home runs: 37
- Runs batted in: 369
- Stats at Baseball Reference

Teams
- Cincinnati Reds (1988–1989); Los Angeles Dodgers (1989–1993); Cincinnati Reds (1994–1998); New York Mets (1998); Colorado Rockies (1999); Arizona Diamondbacks (1999–2000); New York Mets (2000–2001); Milwaukee Brewers (2002); Chicago Cubs (2003); Florida Marlins (2003–2005)

Career highlights and awards
- World Series champion (2003); MLB record 212 career pinch hits

Leonard Anthony Harris (born October 28, 1964) is an American former Major League Baseball utility infielder. He is currently Bench Coach for Cincinnati Reds Single-A Affiliate Daytona Tortugas. Listed at 5' 10", 195 lb., Harris batted left-handed and threw right-handed. He is best known for holding the record for the most pinch hits in a Major League career, with 212.

== Professional career ==
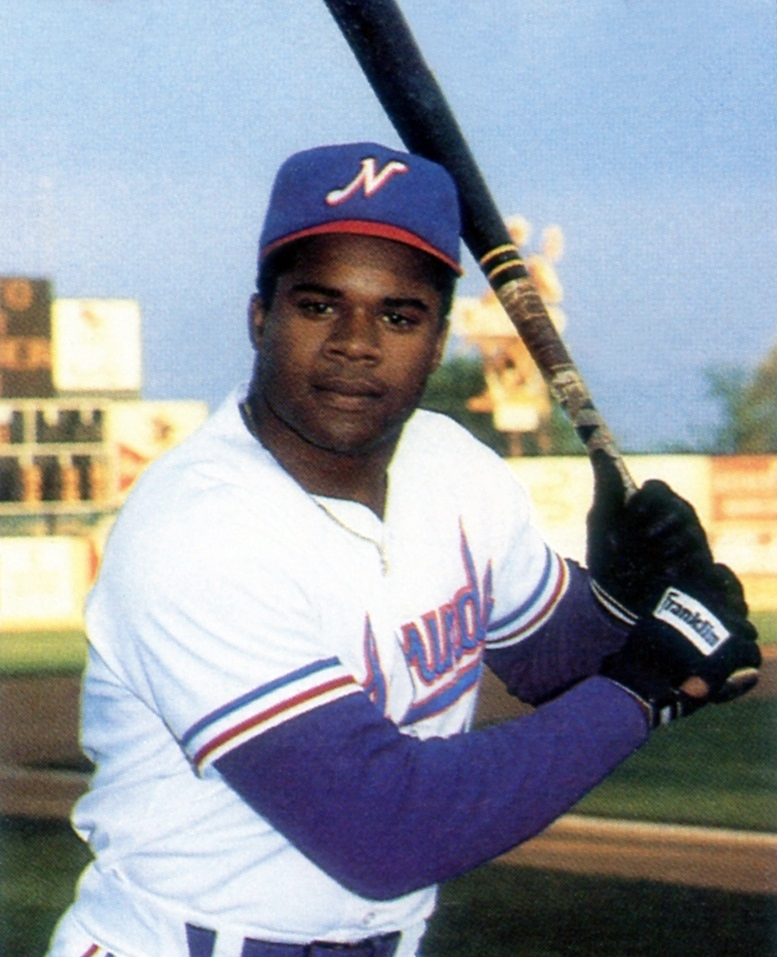
Harris with the Nashville Sounds in 1988

Harris was the Cincinnati Reds' fifth-round pick in the 1983 amateur draft. He made his major league debut with the Reds in 1988. He batted .372 in 16 games with Cincinnati in 1988. He played 61 games with the Reds in 1989; his batting average that year with the Reds was .223, and he was traded to the Los Angeles Dodgers along with Kal Daniels for Tim Leary and Mariano Duncan.

Harris played with the Dodgers through the 1993 season, playing in at least 107 games each season. 1993 was also the year when he started doing more pinch hitting. He never hit more than 3 home runs in any given year until 1996, but while with the Dodgers he did have several good seasons at the plate; he batted .304 in 1990 and .287 in 1991.

He became a free agent after the 1993 season, at which point he re-signed with Cincinnati, where he continued to play until he was traded to the New York Mets in 1998. Harris pitched once for the Reds, on June 1, 1998. It was the first time a Reds position player had been used as a pitcher in ten years.

In 1998, he batted .295 with the Reds in 57 games, but after joining the Mets, he batted only .232 and did not re-sign with the Mets the following year, instead opting to sign with the Colorado Rockies. He hit well (.297 in 158 at-bats) with Colorado, but was traded to the Arizona Diamondbacks for minor leaguer Belvani Martinez after 91 games there. He went 11-for-29 in 19 games with the Diamondbacks; he remained in Arizona for the first two months of the 2000 season, when he was traded back to the Mets for pitcher Bill Pulsipher. He finished the 2000 season with the Mets and also spent the 2001 season there. In 2001, he broke MLB's career pinch hits record, previously held by Manny Mota (150). Note, the 150-mark has also been surpassed by Mark Sweeney (175).

The 2002 season proved successful for Harris. He batted .305 in 122 games with the Milwaukee Brewers at the age of 37, showing that he would still be able to play for several more years. He started the 2003 season with the Chicago Cubs, with whom he played 75 games before being released and signing with the Florida Marlins. He was on the Marlins' championship team in the 2003 World Series. Although he batted just .193 in the 2003 campaign, he re-signed for one year with the Marlins in 2004. Although he had said that he would retire after the 2004 season, he re-signed for another year with the Marlins in 2005 and said that he would return for the 2006 season. The Marlins released him during spring training in 2006.

== Coaching career ==
After his release, he became the infield coordinator for the Washington Nationals, and eventually, the hitting coach. He was fired by the Nationals on September 28, 2008, after less than two seasons on the job.

On October 24, 2008, Harris became the Los Angeles Dodgers minor league hitting instructor at Camelback Ranch, the team's spring training facility. In 2011, he was the hitting coach for the Great Lakes Loons. After serving as a coach for the Gulf Coast League Marlins, he became the assistant hitting coach of the Miami Marlins and later became the third base coach of the Miami Marlins. He was let go by the Marlins after the 2016 season. For the 2017 season, Harris returned to the Reds as a coach for their Arizona league affiliate.

In 2025, he was named bench coach of the Daytona Tortugas the Single-A affiliate of the Cincinnati Reds.
