= Mike Sharperson =

American baseball player (1961–1996)

- Third baseman / Second baseman
- Born: October 4, 1961; Orangeburg, South Carolina, U.S.
- Died: May 26, 1996 (aged 34); Las Vegas, Nevada, U.S.
- Batted: Right Threw: Right

MLB debut
- April 6, 1987, for the Toronto Blue Jays

Last MLB appearance
- July 15, 1995, for the Atlanta Braves

MLB statistics
- Batting average: .280
- Home runs: 10
- Runs batted in: 123
- Stats at Baseball Reference

Teams
- Toronto Blue Jays (1987); Los Angeles Dodgers (1987–1993); Atlanta Braves (1995)

Career highlights and awards
- All-Star (1992); 2× World Series champion (1988, 1995)

Michael Tyrone Sharperson (October 4, 1961 – May 26, 1996) was an American infielder in Major League Baseball who played for the Toronto Blue Jays (1987), Los Angeles Dodgers (1987–1993) and Atlanta Braves (1995). Sharperson batted and threw right-handed. He was born in Orangeburg, South Carolina.

In an eight-season career, Sharperson posted a .280 batting average with 10 home runs and 123 RBI in 557 games.

== Career ==
Sharperson was drafted by the Toronto Blue Jays in the first round (11th pick) of the 1981 amateur draft. He made his debut with Toronto in 1987 and was traded to the Los Angeles Dodgers in midseason.

A member of the Dodgers' 1988 World Series championship team, Sharperson was part of the group of utility players known as "the Stunt Men", for their ability to play many different positions and roles. While mostly used at third base and second, Sharperson also played shortstop, first base and right field.

In 1990, Sharperson hit .297 with career-highs in hits (106) and games (129). His most productive season came in 1992, when he hit .300 with 21 doubles and 48 runs (all career-highs), and made the National League All-Star team.

Released by the Dodgers before the 1994 season, Sharperson signed with the Red Sox, then with the Cubs, but did not play for them. He appeared in seven games with the Atlanta Braves in 1995 and became a free agent at the end of the season. He then signed a minor league contract with the San Diego Padres.

== Death ==
In 1996, Sharperson was playing for the Triple-A Las Vegas Stars. He was driving to McCarran International Airport to join the Padres in Montreal against the Expos after being recalled when he died in a one-car crash at the junction of I-15 and I-215 just south of the Las Vegas Strip. He was southbound on I-15 at about 2:45 a.m. when he apparently realized he missed his turn onto I-215. A witness said that Sharperson tried to make a right turn onto I-215, but lost control in the rain and went into a dirt median. Local law enforcement who arrived at the scene of the accident stated that Sharperson had been ejected through his car's sunroof during the accident. He was 34 years old.

== See also ==
- List of baseball players who died during their careers
