= Mike Scioscia =

American baseball player and manager (born 1958)

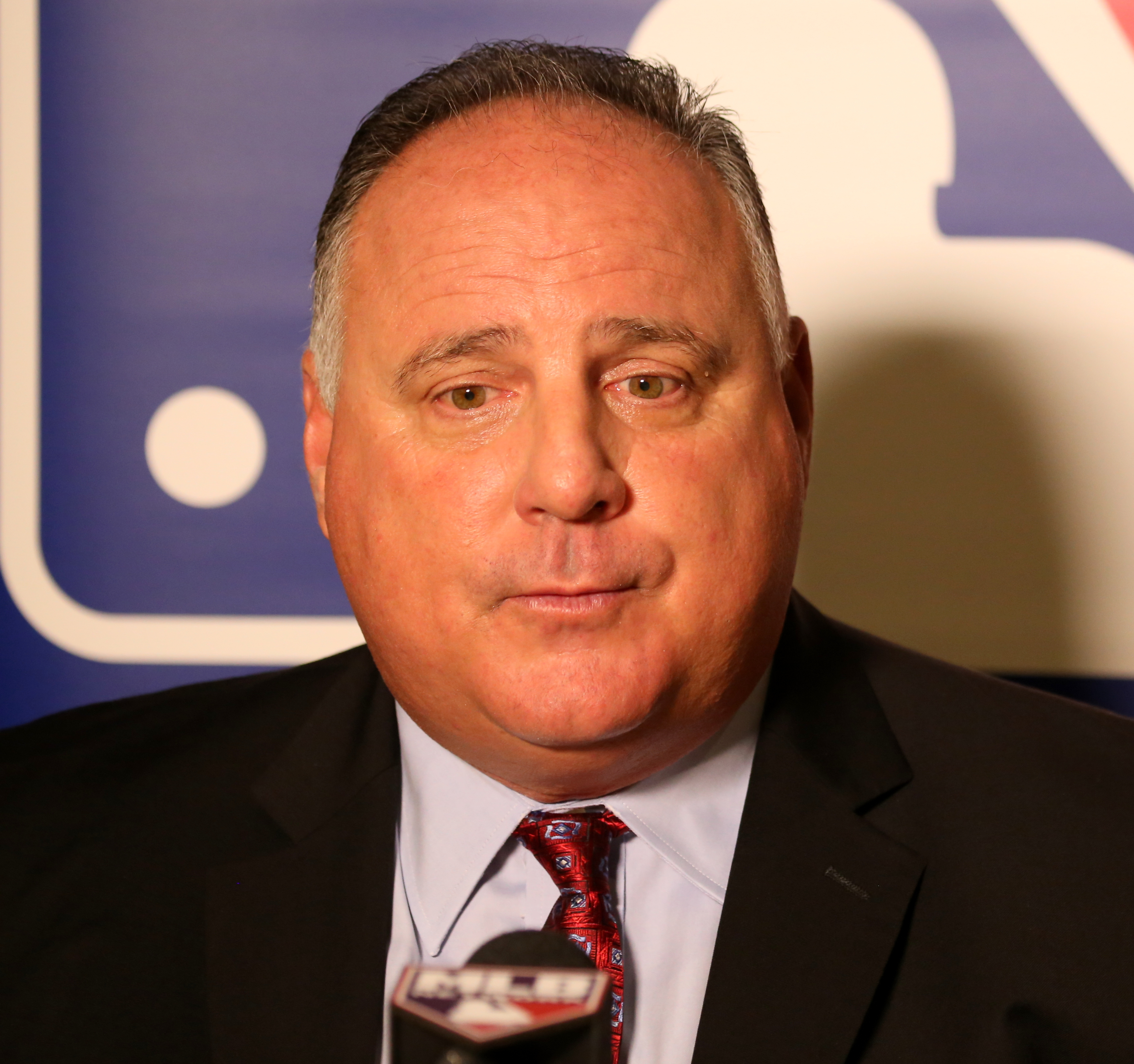
- Scioscia at the MLB Winter Meetings in 2015
- Catcher / Manager
- Born: November 27, 1958 (age 67); Upper Darby Township, Pennsylvania, U.S.
- Batted: Left Threw: Right

MLB debut
- April 20, 1980, for the Los Angeles Dodgers

Last MLB appearance
- October 2, 1992, for the Los Angeles Dodgers

MLB statistics
- Batting average: .259
- Home runs: 68
- Runs batted in: 446
- Managerial record: 1,650–1,428
- Winning %: .536
- Stats at Baseball Reference
- Managerial record at Baseball Reference

Teams
- As player: Los Angeles Dodgers (1980–1992); As manager: Anaheim Angels / Los Angeles Angels of Anaheim / Los Angeles Angels (2000–2018); As coach: Los Angeles Dodgers (1997–1998)

Career highlights and awards
- 2× All-Star (1989, 1990); 3× World Series champion (1981, 1988, 2002); 2× AL Manager of the Year (2002, 2009)

Michael Lorri Scioscia (/ˈsoʊʃə/ SOH-shə; born November 27, 1958), nicknamed "Sosh" and "El Jefe" (Spanish for "The Boss"), is an American former catcher and manager in Major League Baseball (MLB). He managed the Angels from the 2000 season through the 2018 season, and was the longest-tenured manager in MLB and second-longest-tenured coach/manager in the "Big Four" (MLB, NFL, NHL, and NBA), behind only Gregg Popovich, at the time of his retirement. As a player, Scioscia made his major league debut with the Los Angeles Dodgers in 1980. He was selected to two All-Star Games and won two World Series over the course of his 13-year playing career, which was spent entirely with the Dodgers; this made him the only person in MLB history to spend his entire playing career with one team and entire managing career with another team with 10+ years in both organizations. He was signed by the San Diego Padres and Texas Rangers late in his career, but never appeared in a game for either team due to injury.

After his playing career ended, Scioscia spent several seasons as a minor league manager and major league coach in the Dodgers organization before being hired as the Anaheim Angels' manager after the 1999 season. As a manager, Scioscia led the Angels to their only-to-date World Series championship in 2002. He is the Angels' all-time managerial leader in wins, games managed, and division titles. Scioscia was honored with the American League Manager of the Year Award in 2002 and 2009. On May 8, 2011, Scioscia became the 56th manager to win 1,000 or more games, and the 23rd to have all 1,000 or more victories with a single team.

== Early life ==
Michael Lorri Scioscia was born on November 27, 1958, in Upper Darby Township, Pennsylvania.

== Professional career ==
=== Draft and minor leagues ===
Scioscia attended Springfield High School, a public school located in the suburbs of Philadelphia, where he was a catcher for future major leaguer Bob Gibson (not to be confused with the Hall of Fame pitcher of the same name). Scioscia was drafted by the Los Angeles Dodgers in the first round (19th overall pick) of the 1976 amateur draft.

=== Los Angeles Dodgers (1980–1992) ===
Dodger manager Tommy Lasorda helped lobby Scioscia to sign with the Dodgers after the team drafted him out of high school. Scioscia debuted for the Dodgers in 1980 (eventually replacing Steve Yeager as the starting catcher) and went on to play 12 years for the team.

Scioscia made himself invaluable to the Dodgers by making the effort to learn Spanish in order to better communicate with rookie sensation Fernando Valenzuela in 1981.

When I made Mike the No. 1 catcher, the writers (referring to sportswriters in the 1980s) came to me and said, "[Competing catcher] Steve Yeager said you made Scioscia the No. 1 catcher because he's Italian." I said, "That's a lie. I made him the No. 1 catcher because I'm Italian."

— Tommy Lasorda

Scioscia went to the San Diego Padres in 1993, but suffered a torn rotator cuff injury during spring training that year and did not play in any regular season games for the team. He closed out his career with the Texas Rangers in 1994 after a failed attempt to come back from the injury, again without having played in any regular season games that year.

Exclusively a catcher, the 6-foot, 2-inch, 230 pound Scioscia was primarily known for his defense. Former Dodgers vice president Al Campanis once called Scioscia the best plate-blocking catcher he had seen in his 46-year baseball career; this sentiment was echoed by other Dodger figures such as LaSorda and broadcaster Vin Scully. During one notable collision with St. Louis Cardinals' slugger Jack Clark in July 1985, Scioscia was knocked unconscious but still held onto the ball. For his part, however, Scioscia has claimed that he had an even harder plate collision the following season.

The one collision that absolutely I got hit harder than anybody else was Chili Davis in 1986 when he was with the Giants. Chili plays hard; he's 6' 3", looks like Apollo Creed, got a nice lean. I saw stars. That was the hardest I've been hit, including my years of playing football. It was a heck of a collision…He was out that time. We were both out.

— Mike Scioscia

Scioscia's technique for blocking the plate and making a tag varied slightly from the traditional manner employed by most catchers. When applying the tag, most catchers hold the baseball in their bare hand, with that hand then being inside their catcher's mitt to apply the tag with both hands. Scioscia preferred to hold the ball in his catcher's mitt without making use of his bare hand. Also, Scioscia felt he was less prone to injury in a collision if he positioned his body so that he was kneeling on both knees and turned to the side, whereas most catchers make their tag either standing or on one knee.

Indeed, Scioscia was noted for his durability. After missing most of the 1983 season after tearing his rotator cuff, Scioscia played in more than 100 games each season for the remainder of his career with the Dodgers. Offensively, Scioscia was generally unspectacular, but he was known as a solid contact hitter, striking out fewer than once every 14 at-bats over the course of his career. Because of his ability to make contact, he was sometimes used as the second hitter in the batting order—an atypical slot for a player with Scioscia's large-set frame and overall batting average. He had a particularly strong season on offense in 1985, batting .296 and finishing second in the National League in on-base percentage.

Scioscia also hit a dramatic, ninth inning, game-tying home run off the New York Mets' Dwight Gooden in Game 4 of the 1988 National League Championship Series. With the Dodgers going on to win that game in extra innings, Scioscia's blast (which came after he had hit only three home runs that entire season) proved crucial to the Dodgers' ultimately prevailing in that series.

Scioscia was a key player on the Dodgers' 1981 and 1988 World Series champion teams, and is the Dodgers' all-time leader in games caught (1,395). In 1990, Scioscia became the first Dodger catcher to start in an All-Star Game since Hall of Famer Roy Campanella. Alfredo Griffin, Scioscia's teammate from the 1988 Dodger team, served on Scioscia's coaching staff with the Los Angeles Angels of Anaheim from 2000 to 2018. Scioscia earned as much as $2,183,333/year in salary toward the end of his career, and earned the unofficial total sum of $10,109,999 over his career.

Scioscia was involved in three no-hitters in his career: he was on the losing end of Nolan Ryan's fifth no-hitter on September 26, 1981 vs. the Houston Astros, and on the winning side, he caught Fernando Valenzuela's on June 29, 1990 vs. the St. Louis Cardinals and Kevin Gross's on August 17, 1992 vs. the San Francisco Giants. He caught 136 shutouts during his career, ranking him fourth all-time among major league catchers. Scioscia used the same catcher's mitt for most of his playing career.

==== Career statistics ====
G	AB	R	H	2B	3B	HR	RBI	BB	SO	SB	AVG	SLG	OBP	FLD%
1,441	4,373	398	1,131	198	12	68	446	567	307	29	.259	.356	.344	.988

== Managerial career ==
=== Anaheim Angels / Los Angeles Angels of Anaheim / Los Angeles Angels (2000–2018) ===
After spending several years as a coach in the Dodgers' organization, Scioscia was hired by new Angels general manager Bill Stoneman to be the Angels' manager after the 1999 season, following the late-season resignation of Terry Collins and interim managerial tenure of Joe Maddon. Scioscia would retain Maddon as an assistant until Maddon received his own managerial position with the Tampa Bay Devil Rays in 2006.

Under the leadership of Stoneman and Scioscia, the Angels ended their 16-year playoff drought in 2002, winning the AL Wild Card and ultimately winning the franchise's first World Series, a series that pitted the Angels against a San Francisco Giants team managed by Scioscia's former Dodgers teammate Dusty Baker. In winning the series, Scioscia became the 17th person to win a World Series as both a player and a manager (not including those who won only as a player-manager).

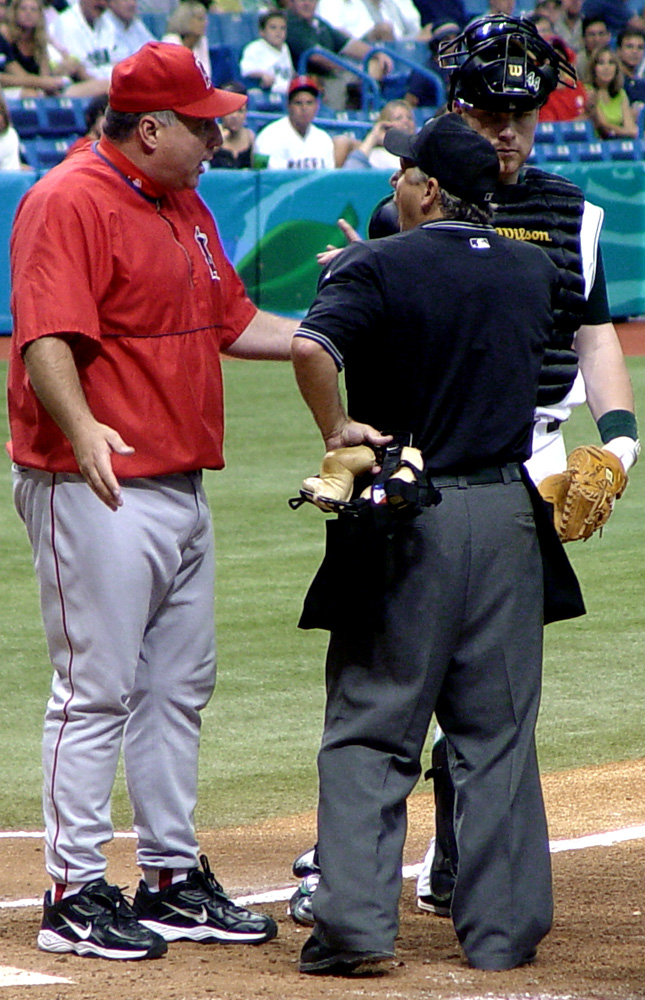
Scioscia arguing with umpire Tom Hallion in 2005

Scioscia was honored as 2002 American League Manager of Year by the Baseball Writers' Association of America (the official Manager of the Year award, as recognized by Major League Baseball). He was also named 2002 A.L. Manager of the Year by The Sporting News, USA Today Sports Weekly, and the Negro Leagues Baseball Museum. He was further named the overall Major League 2002 Manager of the Year by Baseball America.

The Angels under Scioscia would go on to enjoy a period of on-field success never before seen in franchise history, winning five American League West division titles in six years (surpassing the number won by all previous Angels managers combined). Scioscia's Angels broke the franchise single-season win record with 99 wins in 2002, and again with 100 wins in 2008. However, they have yet to win another American League pennant or World Series since their memorable 2002 run.

Scioscia is the Angels' all-time leader in wins and games managed, surpassing original manager Bill Rigney's totals in both categories in 2007 and 2008, respectively. He was also the longest tenured manager in Major League Baseball. In January 2009, he received a multi-year extension on his contract; his former contract ran through the 2010 season. The number of additional years created through this contract was 10 years, through 2018. Scioscia was honored as 2009 American League Major League Manager of Year by the Baseball Writers' Association of America (the official Manager of the Year award, as recognized by Major League Baseball).

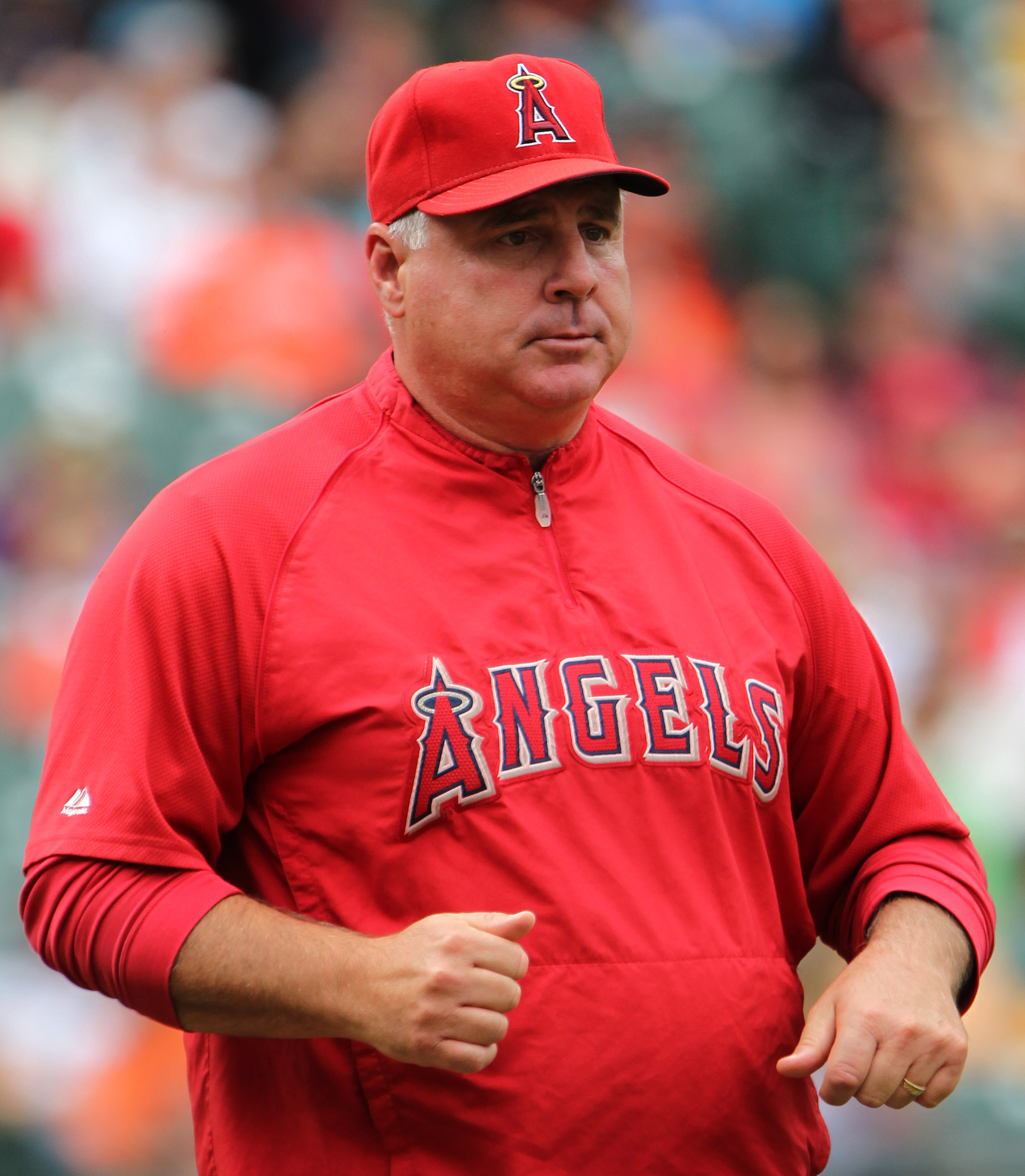
Scioscia in 2011

Scioscia became the first manager to reach the playoffs in six of his first ten seasons. On May 8, 2011, the Angels defeated the Cleveland Indians, which marked Scioscia's 1,000th win as a major league manager.

A rift developed between Scioscia and Jerry Dipoto, the Angels' general manager, when Dipoto fired Mickey Hatcher from the role of the team's hitting coach in 2012. Despite rumors that the Angels might replace either Dipoto or Scioscia after the 2013 season, Moreno announced that both would return to the Angels for the 2014 season.

Tension between Dipoto and Scioscia continued during the 2015 season regarding the way Scioscia and his coaches delivered statistical reports developed by Dipoto and the front office to their players. Dipoto resigned his post on July 1, 2015, despite efforts from the Angels to convince him to stay. Former Angels general manager Bill Stoneman, who hired Scioscia before the 2000 season, was hired as the interim general manager.

On September 30, 2018, immediately following the conclusion of the final game of the 2018 season, Scioscia announced that he would step down as manager of the Angels. He finished his 19 seasons as Angels' manager with a record of 1,650 wins and 1,428 losses.

=== United States national team ===
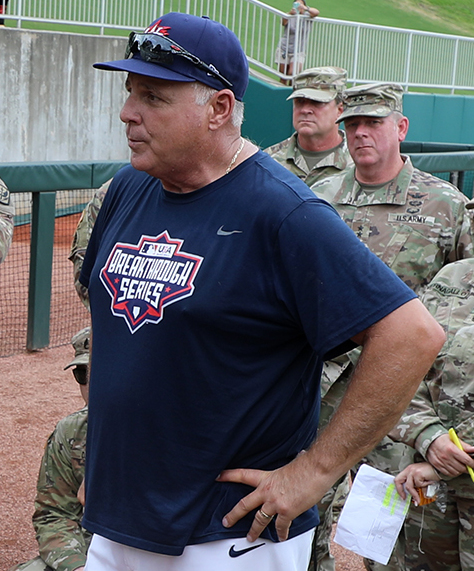
Scioscia at the USA Baseball National Training Complex in 2021

On April 6, 2021, USA Baseball announced that Scioscia would manage the United States national baseball team during qualifying for Covid-delayed baseball at the 2020 Summer Olympics, held in Tokyo in 2021. The team subsequently qualified, with Scioscia serving as manager for the Olympics. The team went on to win silver, falling to Japan in the gold-medal game.

On July 26, 2024, it was announced that Scioscia would helm the United States national team at the 2024 WBSC Premier12.

=== Managerial record ===
As of games played on September 30, 2018.

Team	Year	Regular season					Postseason			
Team	Year	Games	Won	Lost	Win %	Finish	Won	Lost	Win %	Result
ANA	2000	162	82	80	.506	3rd in AL West	–	–	–	
ANA	2001	162	75	87	.463	3rd in AL West	–	–	–	
ANA	2002	162	99	63	.611	2nd in AL West	11	5	.688	Won World Series (SF)
ANA	2003	162	77	85	.475	3rd in AL West	–	–	–	
ANA	2004	162	92	70	.568	1st in AL West	0	3	.000	Lost ALDS (BOS)
LAA	2005	162	95	67	.586	1st in AL West	4	6	.400	Lost ALCS (CWS)
LAA	2006	162	89	73	.549	2nd in AL West	–	–	–	
LAA	2007	162	94	68	.580	1st in AL West	0	3	.000	Lost ALDS (BOS)
LAA	2008	162	100	62	.617	1st in AL West	1	3	.250	Lost ALDS (BOS)
LAA	2009	162	97	65	.599	1st in AL West	5	4	.556	Lost ALCS (NYY)
LAA	2010	162	80	82	.494	2nd in AL West	–	–	–	
LAA	2011	162	86	76	.531	2nd in AL West	–	–	–	
LAA	2012	162	89	73	.549	3rd in AL West	–	–	–	
LAA	2013	162	78	84	.481	3rd in AL West	–	–	–	
LAA	2014	162	98	64	.605	1st in AL West	0	3	.000	Lost ALDS (KC)
LAA	2015	162	85	77	.525	3rd in AL West	–	–	–	
LAA	2016	162	74	88	.457	4th in AL West	–	–	–	
LAA	2017	162	80	82	.494	2nd in AL West	–	–	–	
LAA	2018	162	80	82	.494	4th in AL West	–	–	–	
Total Ref.:		3078	1650	1428	.536		21	27	.438	

== Television appearances ==
In addition to his more orthodox work in baseball, Scioscia is also notable for a guest appearance as himself on The Simpsons episode "Homer at the Bat" in 1992, while he was still a player. In the storyline, Scioscia is one of several Major League players recruited by Smithers to work a token job at the Springfield Nuclear Power Plant so that he could play on the plant's softball team against a rival power plant. Scioscia tells Smithers, who found him while deer hunting, that while he enjoyed playing baseball, he always wanted to be a blue collar power plant employee, and consequently is the only player who takes the power plant job seriously. His character is ultimately hospitalized with a life-threatening case of radiation poisoning that leaves him unable to play.

They called and asked if I'd be interested in doing it, and it so happened that it was my favorite show. I was excited . . . Every year I get a (residual) check for like $4 . . . I cash 'em. I don't want to mess up their accounting department.

— Mike Scioscia, about his appearance on The Simpsons

Scioscia made a second appearance on The Simpsons with the episode "MoneyBart", which premiered on October 10, 2010. Having survived the radiation poisoning, he tells Marge and Bart that it gave him superhuman managing powers (as well as the ability to de-magnetize credit cards) and that the best players listen to their managers.

Scioscia acted as a celebrity endorser of the Howard's Appliance & Big Screen Superstore chain in Southern California.

== Personal life ==
Early in his career after signing with the Dodgers, Scioscia spent the off-seasons attending Penn State University, working toward a computer science degree.

On May 3, 1982, 21-year-old Anne McIlquham went to Dodger Stadium with a plate of cookies for Mike Scioscia, whom she hoped to meet at a pre-game autograph session. Scioscia was replaced at the session by another player, but a security guard named Jesse brought McIlquham and her cookies to meet him anyway. Twenty days later Anne and Scioscia went on their first date; Jesse was a guest at their January 1985 wedding.

Scioscia and his wife Anne have two children, and reside in Westlake Village, California. Their son, Matthew, was born in September 1988; daughter Taylor was born in December 1991.

Matthew played baseball for Notre Dame, and was selected in the 45th round by the Angels in the 2011 MLB draft. He signed on June 20, and was assigned to the AZL Angels. He was traded to the Chicago Cubs for Trevor Gretzky, son of Wayne Gretzky, on March 20, 2014. He was released by the Windy City ThunderBolts on June 14.

== See also ==
- List of Major League Baseball All-Star Game managers
- List of Major League Baseball career putouts as a catcher leaders
- List of Major League Baseball players who spent their entire career with one franchise
- List of Major League Baseball managers with most career ejections
- List of Major League Baseball managers with most career wins

Sporting positions
Preceded by Bill Russell	Los Angeles Dodgers Bench Coach; 1997–1998	Succeeded by Jim Tracy
Preceded by Ron Roenicke	Albuquerque Dukes Manager; 1999	Succeeded by Tom Gamboa
