= Cinephilia =

Passionate interest in films

Cinephilia (/ˌsɪnɪˈfɪliə/ SIN-ih-FIL-ee-ə; also cinemaphilia or filmophilia) is the term used to refer to a passionate interest in films, film theory, and film criticism. The term is a portmanteau of the words cinema and philia, one of the four ancient Greek words for love. A person with such an interest is called a cinephile (/ˈsɪnɪfaɪl/ SIN-ih-fyle), cinemaphile, filmophile, or, informally, a film buff (also movie buff). To a cinephile, a film is often not just a source of entertainment as they see films from a more critical point of view.

In English, cinephile is sometimes used interchangeably with the word cineaste (/ˈsɪniˌæst, ˈsɪneɪˌæst/ SIN-ee-ast, -ay-), though in the original French the term cinéaste ([sine.ast]) refers to a filmmaker.

== Definition ==
In a review of a book on the history of cinephilia, Mas Generis writes: "Cinephilia, despite its transparent etymological meaning—love of cinema—is a term that resists ready and shared understanding." Generis also introduces a quote from film scholar Annette Michelson that states that there is, "No one such thing as cinephilia, but rather forms and periods of cinephilia." As described by Antoine de Baecque and Thierry Frémaux, "The definitive essence of cinephilia is a culture of the discarded that prefers to find intellectual coherence where none is evident and to eulogize the non-standard and the minor."

Film historian Thomas Elsaesser writes that it "reverberates with nostalgia and dedication... more than a passion of going to the movies and only a little less than an entire attitude towards life".

== History ==
=== Pre-war cinephilia ===
Since the beginning of the silent era, there have been film clubs and publications in which people who felt passionately about cinema could discuss their interests and see rare and older works. At the beginning of the sound era, there were more and more people interested in seeing older films, which led to the establishment of organizations such as the Cinémathèque Française, the first major archive devoted to film preservation.

=== Post-war French cinephilia ===
A notable cinephilic community of the 20th century was the one that developed in Paris in the decades following World War II. An influx of foreign films that had been withheld during the Occupation, as well as the screening programs of local film clubs and the Cinémathèque Française, generated interest in world cinema amongst the city's intellectual youth culture. In general, the cinephiles of the period set a template for future like-minded groups by having keen enthusiasm for both older and contemporary films.

Influential film clubs of the period included Objectif 49, whose members included Robert Bresson and Jean Cocteau, and the Ciné-Club du Quartier Latin (Cinema Club of the Latin Quarter). Revue du Cinéma, a magazine published by members of the two clubs, later evolved into the influential film magazine Cahiers du cinéma.

Many of the people who attended the screenings became film critics and later filmmakers, founding the film movement known as the French New Wave. André Bazin, François Truffaut, Jacques Doniol-Valcroze, Claude Chabrol, Jean-Luc Godard, Alexandre Astruc, Jacques Rivette, Agnes Varda, Luc Moullet and others were regulars, and several, most notably Truffaut, maintained their ties to the community after they had achieved fame.

The community fostered an interest in directors and films that had been neglected, forgotten or simply unknown in the West, and led to the development of the auteur theory. The directors the French cinephiles of the period had strong interests in included F. W. Murnau, Robert Flaherty, Sergei Eisenstein, Jean Renoir, Jean Vigo, Orson Welles, Anthony Mann, Louis Feuillade, D. W. Griffith, the Lumière brothers, Alfred Hitchcock and Georges Méliès, whose films would be screened from nitrate prints on special occasions.

=== Filmgoing in the 1960s and 1970s ===
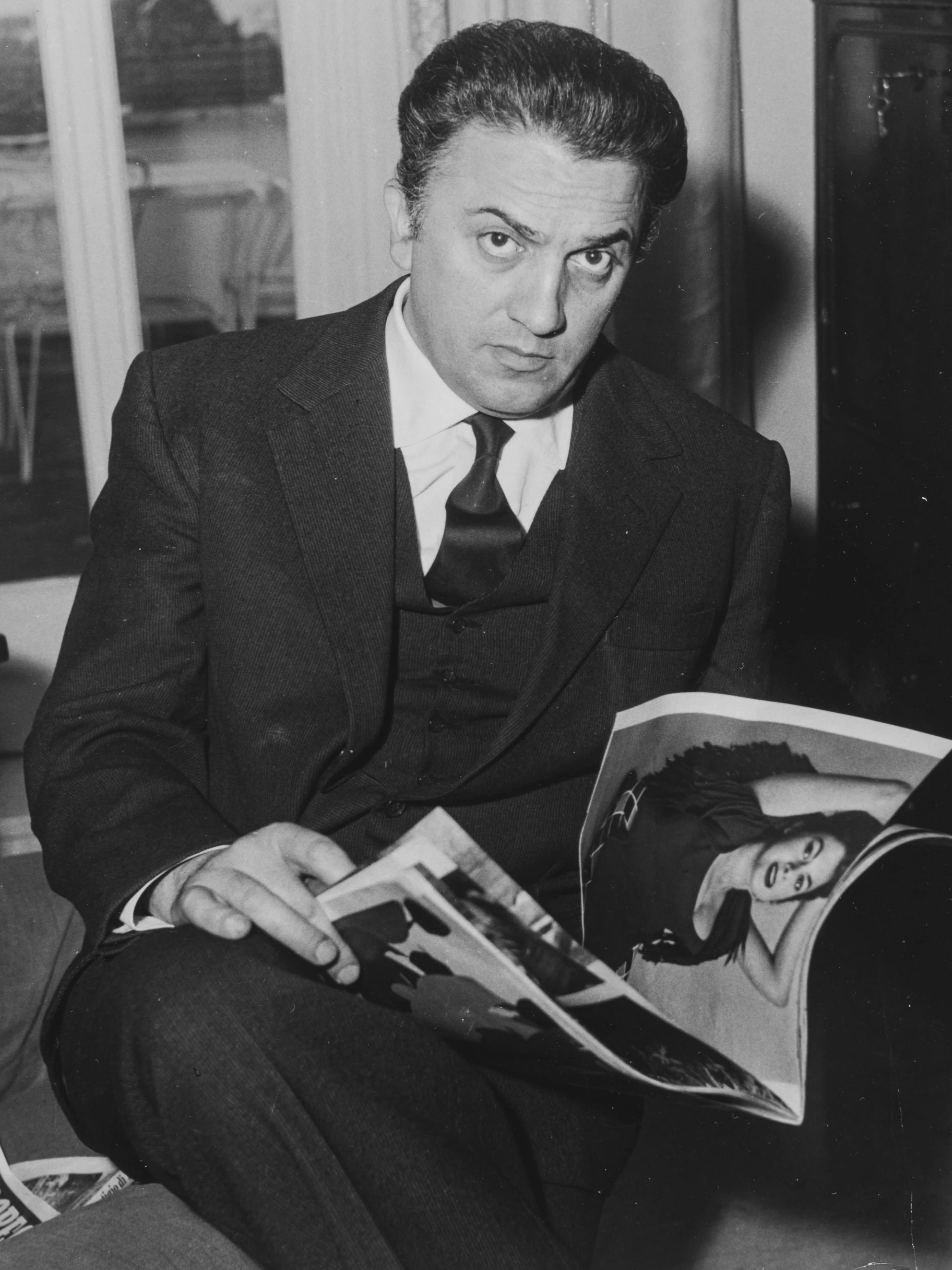
The Italian director Federico Fellini, a fashionable figure in the United States during the 1960s and 1970s, owed part of his popularity to the support of film critics and the distribution of foreign films in order to accommodate the increasingly sophisticated public.

With the popular success of the French New Wave, film-going became fashionable in Europe and America. Revival screenings and independently run cinemas specializing in foreign films became increasingly common. In the United States, New York City was often seen as the center of cinephile culture, due to the wide variety of films available to see at any given time. This culture was also helped by the popularity in America of figures such like Pauline Kael, Andrew Sarris and Susan Sontag. Certain writers and critics, including Sontag, would later come to view this as the "Golden Age" of film-going in the US. Directors such as Ingmar Bergman, Akira Kurosawa, Michelangelo Antonioni and Federico Fellini enjoyed a great deal of popularity in the US and influenced the young generation of film enthusiasts who would become the New Hollywood, including Martin Scorsese, Peter Bogdanovich, Francis Ford Coppola and Woody Allen. Due to growing public interest in films from other countries, specialty distributors such as Janus Films and New Yorker Films began importing and subtitling foreign movies.

The era also saw the growth of college film societies. Though some, like Doc Films at the University of Chicago, had existed since the 1930s, the 1960s saw directors of all generations regularly make appearances at college campuses, whether to revisit their old films or to discuss new ones. The Melbourne Cinematheque, founded in 1948 in Melbourne, Australia, began as the Melbourne University Film Society (MUFS), and was renamed Cinémathèque in 1984.

At the same time, the Parisian cinephilic culture became increasingly politicized. Critics, and by extension the cinephiles who followed their work, began to emphasize political aspects of films and directors. Though many of the major figures of the post-war community has been originally aligned with the political right—including most of the Cahiers du cinéma group—by the late 1960s Cahiers and the young cinephile public in general had aligned with various forms of the Left, with some figures, such as Jean-Luc Godard, aligning with Maoism. In this very politicized climate, cinema was often seen as directly connected to Marxism. Many members of this new generation of cinephiles would become critics and directors, including Serge Daney, Philippe Garrel, and André Téchiné.

Though most of the world's major film festivals had existed for decades by this point—including the Berlin International Film Festival, the Cannes Film Festival and the Venice Film Festival—the period saw the establishment of festivals in nearly every major city. The New York Film Festival, the Karlovy Vary International Film Festival and the Chicago International Film Festival were all started during this time. The Toronto International Film Festival, often seen as second only to the Cannes Film Festival in terms of importance, was founded towards the end of this period, in 1976.

Films championed by cinephiles and Western intellectuals as "cutting-edge" and "revolutionary" from the 1960s-1970s included Lindsay Anderson's Cannes-winning epic If...., Humberto Solás's Lucía and Glauber Rocha's Antonio das Mortes alongside multiple works by Godard and the agitprop documentaries of The Newsreel.

=== Home video and the late 20th century ===
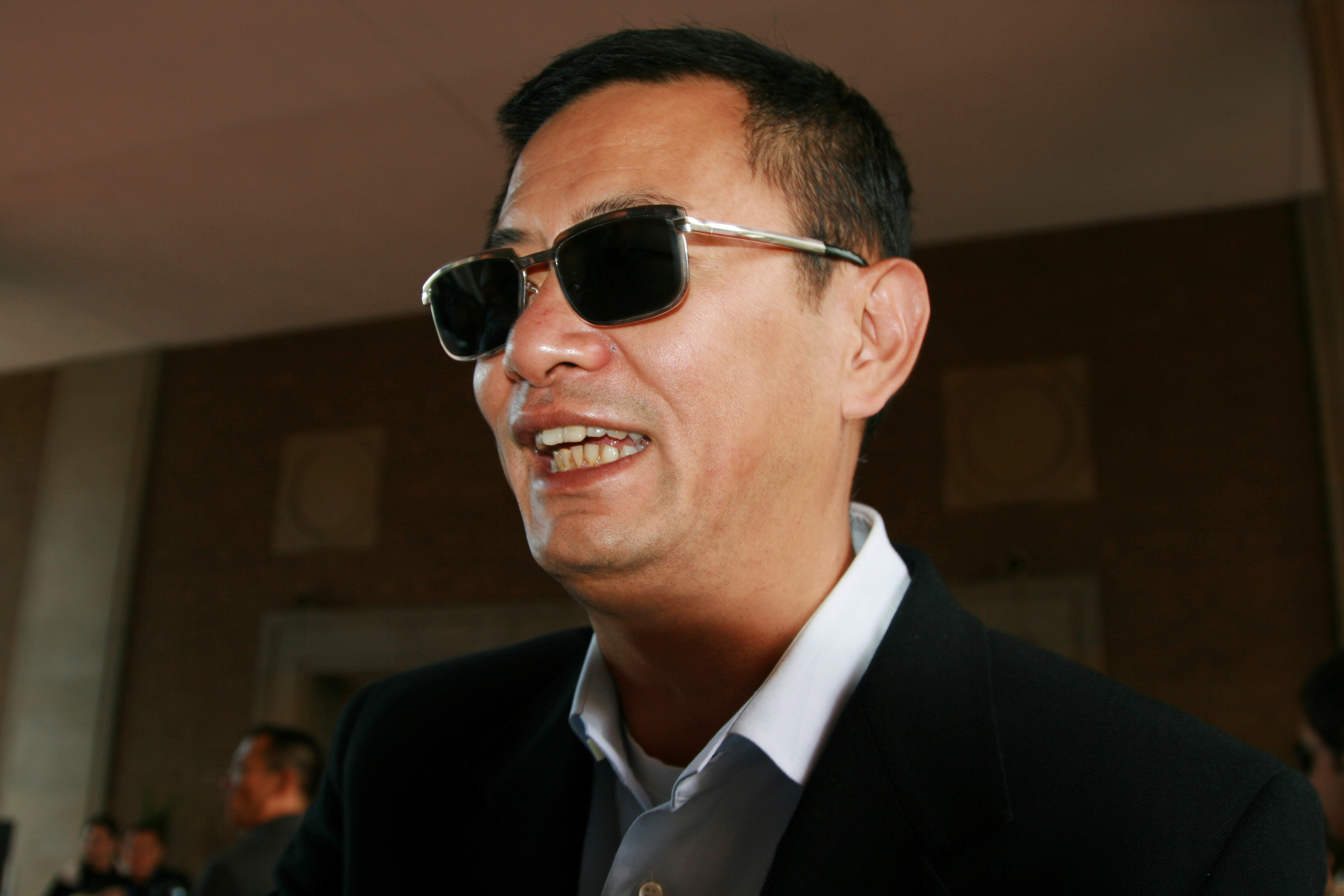
Wong Kar-wai (pictured) is a renowned arthouse film director from Hong Kong known for works such as Chungking Express (1994) and In the Mood for Love (2000).

As television, VHS tapes (as well as video stores like Kim's Video, Video Archives and Blockbuster), DVDs and later streaming digital access became more common, cinephilia became less associated with filmgoing in theatres (much to the dismay of filmgoers like Kael and Sontag).

While Japanese films have enjoyed worldwide distribution in the mid 20th century, the late 20th century saw an increase in interest amongst cinephiles in cinema from other Asian countries, especially China, Hong Kong, Taiwan and, later, Thailand.

=== Contemporary cinephilia ===
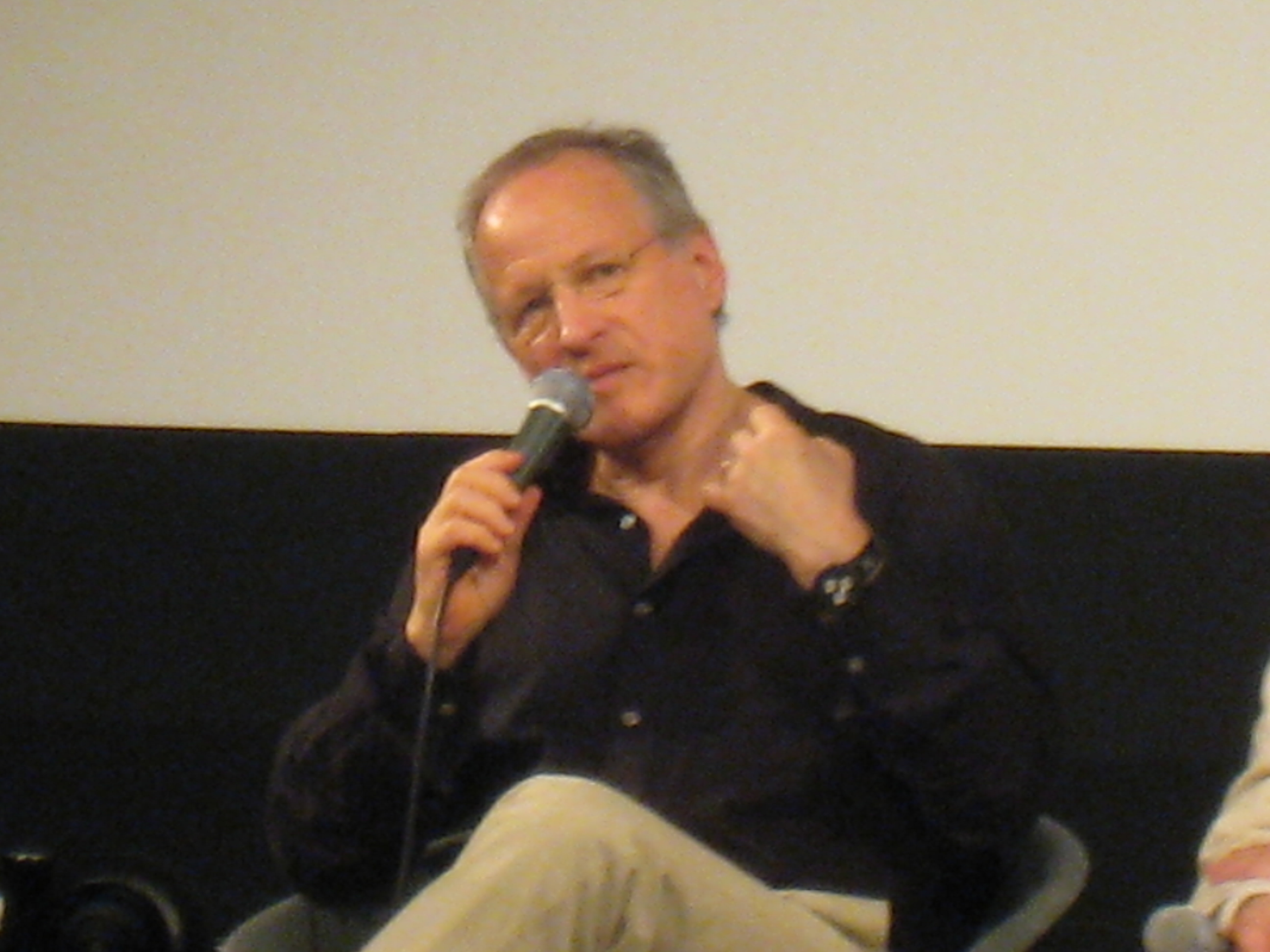
Though his films have met with mixed commercial and critical success, American director Michael Mann (pictured above at Cinémathèque Française in 2009) is often considered to be a major figure of vulgar auteurism by contemporary cinephiles.

Since the beginning of the 21st century, blogging has become a large part of cinephile culture. In the English-speaking world, established critics and theorists like Dave Kehr, David Bordwell, Jonathan Rosenbaum, Glenn Kenny, Wheeler Winston Dixon and Adrian Martin, as well as non-professional cinephiles like Girish Shambu played key roles in building interest in films or theories amongst cinephiles by writing and communicating through blogs. Forums and podcasts have become popular ways to stir discussion, allowing cinephiles from different countries and cultures to discuss ideas about film. The social networking and video streaming service MUBI caters specifically to cinephiles, allowing its members access to films that sometimes haven't been distributed theatrically or on video in their home countries. Home video distribution labels and distributors such as The Criterion Collection (and later, in partnership with Turner Classic Movies, FilmStruck), Masters of Cinema, Facets, Arrow Video, Vinegar Syndrome and Kino cater to cinephiles, often including large amounts of supplemental and critical material with their releases. Another major development in contemporary cinephilia came in the form of the social cataloging application formed in 2011 known as Letterboxd. Hosting approximately 10 million users, Letterboxd is the largest community of online cinephiles to date, allowing users to share their taste in films using a five-star system.

Taiwanese cinephilia had thrived thanks to screenings of various films at cafes like Halfway Cafe and Insomnia Cafe. As was the case with the French cinephilia of the post-war era, the international cinephilic community that has developed on the Internet often emphasizes films and figures that do not have strong critical or popular recognition, including many directors who work within genre film, in what is sometimes dubbed vulgar auteurism. These include Justin Lin, Abel Ferrara, Michael Mann, Roland Emmerich, The Farrelly Brothers, Michael Bay, John Carpenter, Kathryn Bigelow, David Fincher, M. Night Shyamalan, Brian De Palma and Tony Scott.

Filmmaker James N. Kienitz Wilkins's 2023 still image film Still Film argues about the nightmarish effects of cinephilia using 35mm presskit photos for blockbusters from the 1980s-90s.

A notable series of video essays by Canadian filmmaker Stephen Broomer entitled Art & Trash focuses on underground, avant-garde and cult cinema (particularly outsider and psychotronic movies).

=== In popular culture ===
Adnan Virk was the host of the podcast Cinephile that used to broadcast on ESPN until his leave in 2019. In 2004, film critic Chris Gore hosted the game show Ultimate Film Fanatic on IFC. The book series Lil Cinephile is a spin-off of the successful Cinephile: A Card Game created by author Cory Everett (who was once a contestant on the aforementioned Ultimate Film Fanatic).

=== Films about cinephilia ===
- The Projectionist (1970)
- Fade to Black (1980)
- The Purple Rose of Cairo (1985)
- Cinema Paradiso (1989)
- Close-Up (1990)
- American Movie (1999)
- Cinemania (2002)
- The Dreamers (2003)
- Film Geek (2005)
- Hugo (2011)
- Me and Earl and the Dying Girl (2015)
- The Wolfpack (2015)
- Once Upon a Time in Hollywood (2019)
- I Like Movies (2022)
- Film Geek (2023)
- Still Film (2023)
- Kim's Video (2023)
- Nouvelle Vague (2025)
- Videoheaven (2025)

== Cinephilia and filmmaking ==
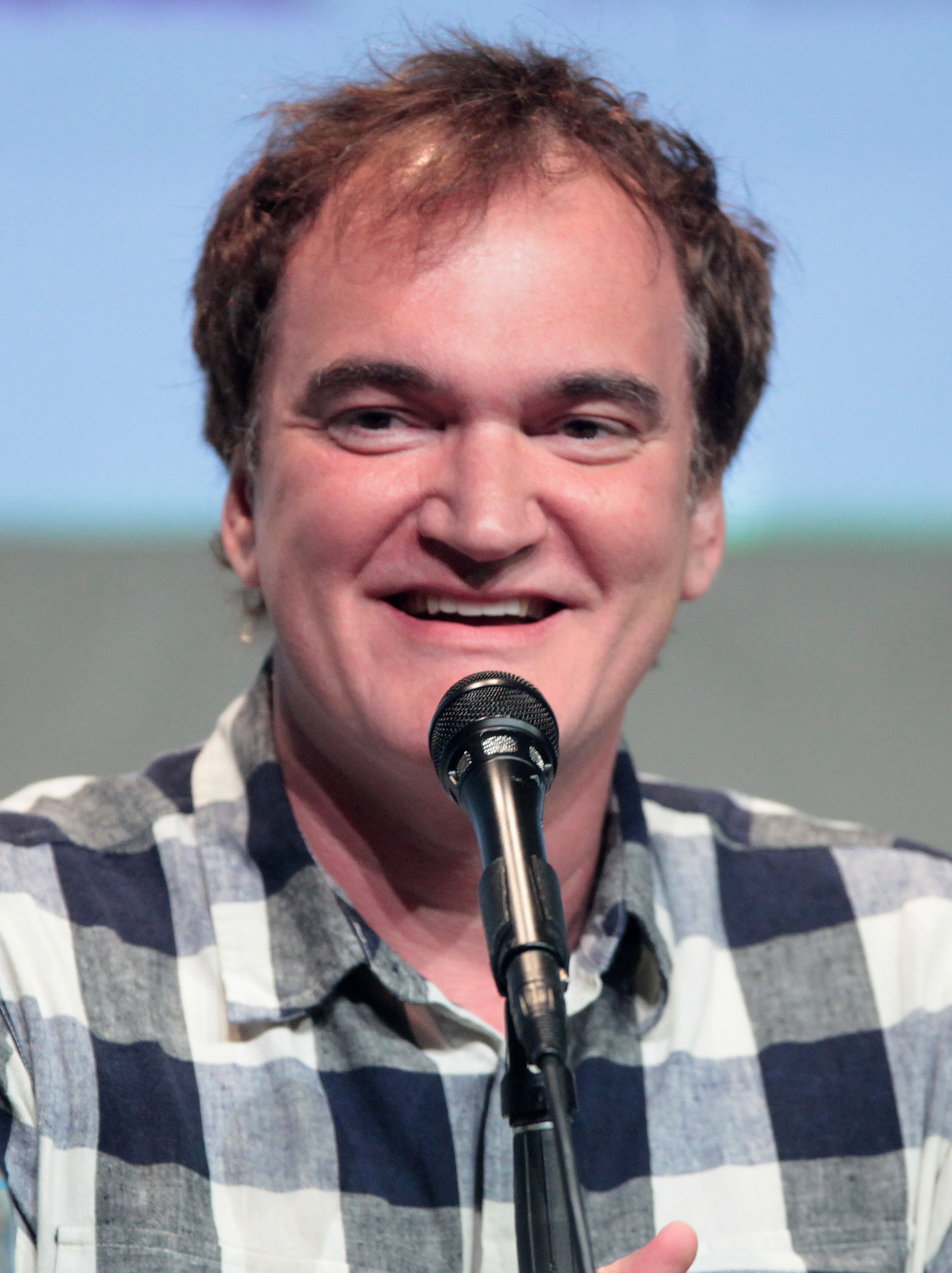
American director and cinephile Quentin Tarantino often makes references in his work to films and directors he admires.

Throughout the history of cinema, there have been numerous directors who developed their understanding of cinema through filmgoing and participation in cinephile communities and organizations instead of within the formal settings of either a film school or a film studio.

The directors of the French New Wave, who learned about filmmaking by attending screenings at film clubs and discussing movies amongst themselves, are often seen as models for cinephiles. Their intellectual omnivorousness, which equated an interest in cinema with strong understandings of literature, art and sometimes philosophy, has continued to have influence on cinephiles.

On the other hand, many directors emphasize their lack of cinephilia or interest in movies as in the cases of Miranda July, Abbas Kiarostami and Peter Greenaway, while each acclaimed by cinephiles, often emphasized their disinterests in cinema when interviewed.

== Cinephobia ==
There have also been different forms of cinephobia (fear or hatred of cinema) from the fear of "losing" celluloid film in the digital age through anxieties about moral values on the big screen to the point of censorship.

== Telephilia ==
Telephilia is the term used to refer to a passionate interest in television. Coined by The New York Times critic Frank Rich as a pejorative term, telephilia was defined as "the pathological longing of Americans, no matter how talentless, to be on television". This early definition was reflective of the negative attitude contemporary critics had toward television, which was frowned upon as inferior to film until the advent of quality television in the 1980s and 1990s. With the rise of quality television, anti-heroic series like The Sopranos and The Wire were cited as improving television content thus earning critical praise.

Telephilia is also said to rival cinephilia for relevance, as production values are higher than ever before on shows such as Mad Men, Breaking Bad and Homeland. Despite this development, there are still intellectuals who consider telephilia as inferior to cinephilia, particularly in cases of obsessions for modern television programs belonging to genres such as melodrama and soap opera. This is also explained by the view that highlighted the unattainable nature of the cinema, which makes it more desirable and extraordinary since it features a regime of presence-yet-absence filmic image, allowing a form of cinematic stardom capable of triggering a series of psychic mechanisms. This is contrasted with television, which is perceived to be more present and immediate—with its stars "famous only in so far as he or she makes frequent television appearances." Some observers, however, note that there is now a destabilization of traditional notions of what constitutes cinephilic tendency due to the availability of film on home media technology.

== List of notable cinephiles ==
=== Film directors ===
- Thom Andersen
- Paul Thomas Anderson
- Wes Anderson
- Ari Aster
- Sean Baker
- Noah Baumbach
- Ingmar Bergman
- Brad Bird
- Peter Bogdanovich
- Kevin Brownlow
- Bong Joon Ho
- Joel and Ethan Coen
- Sofia Coppola
- Joe Dante
- Brian De Palma
- Greta Gerwig
- Jean-Luc Godard
- James Gray
- James Gunn
- Todd Haynes
- Walter Hill
- Joanna Hogg
- Jim Jarmusch
- Barry Jenkins
- Martin Koolhoven
- Stanley Kubrick
- Spike Lee
- Richard Linklater
- David Lynch
- Jean-Pierre Melville
- Pier Paolo Pasolini
- Alexander Payne
- Alex Ross Perry
- Alexandre O. Philippe
- Sam Raimi
- Mark Rappaport
- Josh and Benny Safdie
- Paul Schrader
- Martin Scorsese
- Emma Seligman
- Kevin Smith
- Susan Sontag
- Steven Spielberg
- Quentin Tarantino
- Guillermo del Toro
- Joachim Trier
- François Truffaut
- Gregg Turkington
- Lilly and Lana Wachowski
- John Waters
- Ben Wheatley
- Nicolas Winding Refn
- Edgar Wright

=== Other cinephiles ===
- Pamela Anderson
- James Baldwin
- David Bordwell
- David Bowie
- Ray Carney
- Charli XCX
- Paul Dano
- Sammy Davis Jr.
- Lana Del Rey
- Thomas Duke
- Roger Ebert
- Bret Easton Ellis
- Tatsuki Fujimoto
- Ayo Edebiri
- Bill Hader
- George Harrison
- Jerry Harvey
- Charles Koechlin
- Hideo Kojima
- Frank Ocean
- Patton Oswalt
- Nathan Rabin
- Trent Reznor
- J. D. Salinger
- Andrew Sarris
- Charles M. Schulz
- Cindy Sherman
- Ivan Smagghe
- Stephen Sondheim
- David Stratton
- Yoshihiro Tatsumi
- Abel Tesfaye (The Weeknd)
- Thé Tjong-Khing
- Alex Turner

==== Political and other figures ====
- Adolf Hitler
- Kim Jong Il
- Pope Leo XIV
- Luka Magnotta

== See also ==
- Auteur – film equivalent of a literary author
- Audiophilia – love of high-fidelity sound reproduction
- Vulgar auteurism – A latter-day resurgent focus on mainstream directors of modern popcorn cinema
- Bibliophilia – love of books
- Comicphilia – love of comic books
- The Snob's Dictionary – a humorous look at snobbery by author Dave Kemp
- Videophilia – love of high-quality image reproduction
- Postmodern film and television – similar in content
- Mystery Science Theater 3000 – Cult TV show featuring films considered the worst
- The Incredibly Strange Film Show – Another cinema-based series featuring notable cult filmmakers
- Z Channel – Los Angeles-based TV channel which featured popular and obscure films that was also the subject of a 2004 documentary
