= Film geek =

Film geek is a slang term for a cinephile.

Film geek may also refer to:

- Film Geek (2005 film), an independent film by James Westby
- Film Geek (2023 film), a documentary film by Richard Shepard
