= List of Los Angeles Dodgers broadcasters =

This article details the current and historical radio and television broadcasters for the National League Los Angeles Dodgers. The history of Dodgers' games being broadcast began when the then-Brooklyn Dodgers became one of the first Major League Baseball teams to begin radio broadcasts and were the first to be featured on a television baseball game broadcast, both during the 1939 season.

== Broadcasters ==
Red Barber was the Dodgers' original lead broadcaster, calling Brooklyn Dodgers games on the radio (and later TV) from 1939 to 1953.

Vin Scully called Dodgers games from 1950 to 2016. His longtime partners were Jerry Doggett (1956–1987) and Ross Porter (1977–2004). In 1976, he was selected by Dodgers fans as the Most Memorable Personality (on the field or off) in the team's history. He is also a recipient of the Baseball Hall of Fame's Ford C. Frick Award for broadcasters (inducted in 1982). Unlike the modern style in which multiple sportscasters have an on-air conversation (usually with one functioning as play-by-play announcer and the other(s) as color commentator), Scully, Doggett and Porter generally called games solo, trading with each other inning-by-inning. In the 1980s and early 1990s, Scully would call the radio broadcast except for the 3rd and 7th inning; allowing the other Dodger commentators to broadcast an inning. In the later '90s, Scully would call the first three innings and the last three on television and the middle three on the radio, switching off with his partners.

When Doggett retired after the 1987 season, he was replaced by Hall-of-Fame Dodgers pitcher Don Drysdale, who previously broadcast games for the California Angels. Drysdale died in his hotel room following a heart attack before a game in 1993, resulting in a very difficult broadcast for Scully and Porter, who were told of the death but could not mention it on-air until Drysdale's family had been notified and the official announcement of the death made. He was replaced by former Dodgers outfielder Rick Monday. Porter's tenure was terminated somewhat controversially after the 2004 season, after which the current format of play-by-play announcers and color commentators was installed, led by newcomer Charley Steiner and Monday. Scully, however, continued to announce solo.

As of the 2012 season, Scully called roughly 80 games per season (all home games and select road games in Southern California) for both radio and television. Scully was simulcast for the first three innings of each of his appearances, before calling the remainder of the game exclusively on television. The 2016 season marked his 67th and final season as a Dodgers broadcaster; Scully called a reduced schedule with only 6 road games, including the team's season finale in San Francisco. Scully's commentary during his final game was simulcast in its entirety on radio, instead of only the first three innings.

During games called by Scully, Charley Steiner took over play-by-play on radio beginning with the fourth inning, with Rick Monday as color commentator. If Scully was not calling the game, an alternate team of broadcasters (Steiner and Steve Lyons from 2005 to 2008, Lyons and Eric Collins from 2009 to 2013, and Steiner and Orel Hershiser starting in 2014) called the entire game on television while Steiner and Monday did the same on radio. Starting in 2014, Nomar Garciaparra joined Steiner and Hershiser to form a three-man television crew; for those games, Kevin Kennedy worked with Monday on radio. In 2016, Joe Davis was hired to join the broadcast team to call approximately 50 road games on television. The pre-game show on the radio is hosted by Tim Cates and the post-game show features David Vassegh. Davis was later announced to be the team's new primary play-by-play announcer after Vin Scully's retirement, working with Hershisher. Kennedy left the broadcast booth after 2018 and Tim Neverett joined.

The Dodgers also broadcast on radio in Spanish, and the play-by-play is handled by another Ford C. Frick Award winner, Jaime Jarrín. Jarrín has been with the Dodgers since 1959 until his retirement after the 2022 season. The color analyst for some games is former Dodger pitcher Fernando Valenzuela, for whom Jarrín once translated post-game interviews. Since 2011, the Spanish-language flagship station is KTNQ Univision America 1020.

In 2014, the Dodgers launched Korean-language broadcasts on the second audio program of SportsNet LA, becoming the first MLB team to offer a Korean-language feed for all of its games. The broadcasts are called by Richard Choi and Chong Ho Yim. It followed the launch of Korean Los Angeles Lakers broadcasts on Time Warner Cable SportsNet, and the return of Korean-language radio broadcasts in 2013 following the arrival of Hyun-Jin Ryu.

In 2023, the Dodgers added Stephen Nelson as the new television play-by-play announcer. Nelson previously worked for the MLB Network and called MLB Friday night games on Apple TV Plus and will be substituting for Joe Davis when he is on MLB or NFL game for Fox Sports.

== Broadcast outlets ==
From 2006 to 2013, the over-the-air games were aired on KCAL-TV after the two parties signed a multi-year, multimillion-dollar deal in 2005, and they aired 50 games per season. The previous over-the-air television homes for the Dodgers in Los Angeles were KCOP from 2002 to 2005; KTLA from 1993 to 2001; and KTTV from 1958 to 1992. In their New York days, WOR-TV carried Dodgers games from 1950 until their move following the 1957 season.

The cable television home of the Dodgers was Fox Sports Net Prime Ticket (previously known as Fox Sports Net West 2) from 1997 to 2013.

Starting in the late 1970s through the early 1990s, the Dodgers put a small number of their home games on a subscription/pay-per-view service appropriately carried Dodgervision. During that timeframe, in addition to the road telecasts from KTTV, selected home games were also televised on the ONTV subscription service, the now-defunct Z Channel/SportsChannel Los Angeles network, and then again, on a pay-per-view basis until a majority of Dodgers games debuted on the then-new Fox Sports Net West 2 in 1997, just around the same time FSN West 2's parent company, News Corporation (also owner of KTTV) bought the team from the O'Malley family. In relation to News Corp's purchase of the Dodgers, there was speculation that the Dodgers over-the-air telecasts would return to KTTV, but they were still under contract to KTLA. KTLA's contract with the Dodgers ended in 2001, and the over-the-air telecasts then moved to KTTV's now-sister station, KCOP, with the production handled by FSN West 2.

On radio, the Dodgers have broadcast on KLAC (570 AM) since 2012. In October 2011 the team signed a three-year deal with KLAC parent company Clear Channel Communications. KABC (790 AM) was the Dodgers' flagship station from 1974 through 1997 and from 2008 through 2011. The games had aired on KFWB (980 AM) from 2002 through 2007. Other station to carry the Dodgers included KXTA (1150 AM; now KEIB), which was a sports-talk station, from 1998 through 2001. KFI (640 AM) was the radio flagship from 1960 to 1973, and through its co-ownership with KLAC it has the capability to air Dodgers games if there are conflicts with other events or if technical difficulties on KLAC prevent the broadcasts from airing (such was the case in Game 5 of the 2024 World Series). And previous to that, KMPC (710 AM, now KSPN) was the original flagship radio station in Los Angeles of the vast Dodgers Radio Network, which is carried on 16 stations in five states (California, Nevada, New Mexico, Hawaii, Florida, plus the U.S. Virgin Islands). Their Spanish radio network was led by KHJ which took over in 2008 from longtime home KWKW (1330 AM), with Jarrín, Pepe Yñiguez, and former Dodger great Fernando Valenzuela on the call, and was carried on six stations in California, Nevada, and Arizona. In 2011 Spanish-language Dodger broadcasts returned to KTNQ, the station that carried the games from 1979 to 1986.

During Scully's later years in the broadcast booth, he normally called all nine innings (plus extra innings if necessary) on locally televised games, with the first three innings being simulcast on radio, while Steiner and Monday took over in the final innings on radio. However, as he neared retirement, he cut back on his schedule. Starting in 2005, he largely stopped working non-playoff games played east of Phoenix, and did not regularly call any Dodgers regular-season games that were nationally televised. By his final season in 2016, he called only home games, plus select road games in California; he chose to end his broadcasting career at the end of the 2016 regular season despite the Dodgers making the playoffs.

Fox Sports West's broadcast deal with the team expired at the end of the 2013 MLB season. On June 20, 2011, MLB Commissioner Bud Selig rejected a proposed contract extension between the Dodgers and Fox, stating "Critically, the transaction is structured to facilitate the further diversion of Dodgers assets for the personal needs of Mr. McCourt. Given the magnitude of the transaction, such a diversion of assets would have the effect of mortgaging the future of the franchise to the long-term detriment of the club and its fans." Both Fox Sports West and the Dodgers were involved in separate lawsuits over the team's broadcast rights as well as the sale of the club. On January 10, 2012, Fox and the Dodgers reached a settlement in court, clearing the way for the sale of the team. Fox's exclusive negotiating period with the Dodgers expired on November 30, 2012: both sides were in discussions over a TV deal worth $6 billion over 25 years. The team was also in talks to move to the newly formed Time Warner Cable SportsNet, or to form a team-owned regional sports network with Dick Clark Productions (which was also recently acquired by the Dodgers' parent company, Guggenheim Partners).

In 2014 the Dodgers began a new exclusive television deal with Time Warner Cable and began airing games on the team-controlled cable channel, SportsNet LA. This meant the end of over-the-air broadcast of the team's games, for the first time since 1949. Limited over-the-air broadcasts would only resume in 2016 on KTLA, with several over the air game broadcasts simulcast from SportsNet LA during the season. The simulcasts began first as a chance for non-cable viewers to hear and see Vin Scully's final season as the long time team play-by-play commentator.

== List of current and former broadcasters and stations ==
Year	Local Radio Station	Local Radio Announcers	Foreign Language Radio Station	Foreign Language Radio Announcers	Local Television Station	Local Television Announcers	Cable Television Station	Cable Television Announcers	Notes
1939	WHN	Red Barber; Al Helfer	None	None	None	None	None	None	
1940	WHN	Red Barber; Al Helfer	None	None	None	None	None	None	
1941	WHN	Red Barber; Al Helfer	None	None	None	None	None	None	
1942	WHN	Red Barber; Alan Hale	None	None	None	None	None	None	
1943	WHN	Red Barber; Connie Desmond	None	None	None	None	None	None	
1944	WHN	Red Barber; Connie Desmond	None	None	None	None	None	None	
1945	WHN	Red Barber; Connie Desmond	None	None	None	None	None	None	
1946	WHN	Red Barber; Connie Desmond	None	None	None	None	None	None	
1947	WHN	Red Barber; Connie Desmond	None	None	None	None	None	None	
1948	WMGM	Red Barber; Connie Desmond; Ernie Harwell	None	None	None	None	None	None	
1949	WMGM	Red Barber; Connie Desmond; Ernie Harwell	None	None	None	None	None	None	
1950	WMGM	Red Barber; Connie Desmond; Vin Scully	None	None	WOR-TV	Red Barber; Connie Desmond; Vin Scully	None	None	
1951	WMGM	Red Barber; Connie Desmond; Vin Scully	None	None	WOR-TV	Red Barber; Connie Desmond; Vin Scully	None	None	
1952	WMGM	Red Barber; Connie Desmond; Vin Scully	None	None	WOR-TV	Red Barber; Connie Desmond; Vin Scully	None	None	
1953	WMGM	Red Barber; Connie Desmond; Vin Scully	WHOM	Buck Canel; Herb Marine	WOR-TV	Red Barber; Connie Desmond; Vin Scully	None	None	
1954	WMGM	Connie Desmond; Vin Scully; André Baruch	WHOM	Buck Canel; Herb Marine	WOR-TV	Connie Desmond; Vin Scully; André Baruch	None	None	
1955	WMGM	Connie Desmond; Vin Scully; André Baruch; Al Helfer	WHOM	Buck Canel; Herb Marine	WOR-TV	Connie Desmond; Vin Scully; André Baruch; Al Helfer	None	None	
1956	WMGM	Connie Desmond; Vin Scully; Al Helfer	WHOM	Buck Canel; Herb Marine	WOR-TV	Connie Desmond; Vin Scully; Al Helfer	None	None	
1957	WMGM	Vin Scully; Al Helfer; Jerry Doggett	WHOM	Buck Canel; Herb Marine	WOR-TV	Vin Scully; Al Helfer; Jerry Doggett	None	None	
1958	KMPC	Vin Scully; Jerry Doggett	KWKW	René Cárdenas; Milt Nava	KTTV	Vin Scully; Jerry Doggett	None	None	
1959	KMPC	Vin Scully; Jerry Doggett	KWKW	Jaime Jarrín; René Cárdenas; Miguel Alonzo	KTTV	Vin Scully; Jerry Doggett	None	None	
1960	KFI	Vin Scully; Jerry Doggett	KWKW	Jaime Jarrín; René Cárdenas; Miguel Alonzo	KTTV	Vin Scully; Jerry Doggett	None	None	
1961	KFI	Vin Scully; Jerry Doggett	KWKW	Jaime Jarrín; René Cárdenas; Miguel Alonzo	KTTV	Vin Scully; Jerry Doggett	None	None	
1962	KFI	Vin Scully; Jerry Doggett	KWKW	Jaime Jarrín; Jose Garcia	KTTV	Vin Scully; Jerry Doggett	None	None	
1963	KFI	Vin Scully; Jerry Doggett	KWKW	Jaime Jarrín; Jose Garcia	KTTV	Vin Scully; Jerry Doggett	None	None	
1964	KFI	Vin Scully; Jerry Doggett	KWKW	Jaime Jarrín; Jose Garcia	KTTV	Vin Scully; Jerry Doggett	None	None	
1965	KFI	Vin Scully; Jerry Doggett	KWKW	Jaime Jarrín; Jose Garcia	KTTV	Vin Scully; Jerry Doggett	None	None	
1966	KFI	Vin Scully; Jerry Doggett	KWKW	Jaime Jarrín; Jose Garcia	KTTV	Vin Scully; Jerry Doggett	None	None	
1967	KFI	Vin Scully; Jerry Doggett	KWKW	Jaime Jarrín; Jose Garcia	KTTV	Vin Scully; Jerry Doggett	None	None	
1968	KFI	Vin Scully; Jerry Doggett	KWKW	Jaime Jarrín; Jose Garcia	KTTV	Vin Scully; Jerry Doggett	None	None	
1969	KFI	Vin Scully; Jerry Doggett	KWKW	Jaime Jarrín; Jose Garcia	KTTV	Vin Scully; Jerry Doggett	None	None	
1970	KFI	Vin Scully; Jerry Doggett	KWKW	Jaime Jarrín; Jose Garcia	KTTV	Vin Scully; Jerry Doggett	None	None	
1971	KFI	Vin Scully; Jerry Doggett	KWKW	Jaime Jarrín; Jose Garcia	KTTV	Vin Scully; Jerry Doggett	None	None	
1972	KFI	Vin Scully; Jerry Doggett	KWKW	Jaime Jarrín; Jose Garcia	KTTV	Vin Scully; Jerry Doggett	None	None	
1973	KFI	Vin Scully; Jerry Doggett	KWKW	Jaime Jarrín; Rudy Hoyos	KTTV	Vin Scully; Jerry Doggett	None	None	
1974	KABC	Vin Scully; Jerry Doggett	KWKW	Jaime Jarrín; Rudy Hoyos	KTTV	Vin Scully; Jerry Doggett	None	None	
1974	KABC	Vin Scully; Jerry Doggett	KWKW	Jaime Jarrín; Rudy Hoyos	KTTV	Vin Scully; Jerry Doggett	None	None	
1975	KABC	Vin Scully; Jerry Doggett	KWKW	Jaime Jarrín; Rudy Hoyos	KTTV	Vin Scully; Jerry Doggett	None	None	
1976	KABC	Vin Scully; Jerry Doggett	KWKW	Jaime Jarrín; Rudy Hoyos	KTTV	Vin Scully; Jerry Doggett	None	None	
1977	KABC	Vin Scully; Jerry Doggett; Ross Porter	XEGM	Jaime Jarrín; Rudy Hoyos	KTTV	Vin Scully; Jerry Doggett; Ross Porter	None	None	
1978	KABC	Vin Scully; Jerry Doggett; Ross Porter	XEGM	Jaime Jarrín; Rudy Hoyos	KTTV	Vin Scully; Jerry Doggett; Ross Porter	None	None	
1979	KABC	Vin Scully; Jerry Doggett; Ross Porter	KTNQ	Jaime Jarrín; Rudy Hoyos	KTTV	Vin Scully; Jerry Doggett; Ross Porter	None	None	
1980	KABC	Vin Scully; Jerry Doggett; Ross Porter	KTNQ	Jaime Jarrín; Rudy Hoyos	KTTV	Vin Scully; Jerry Doggett; Ross Porter	ONTV	Geoff Witcher; Al Downing	
1981	KABC	Vin Scully; Jerry Doggett; Ross Porter	KTNQ	Jaime Jarrín; Rudy Hoyos	KTTV	Vin Scully; Jerry Doggett; Ross Porter	ONTV	Geoff Witcher; Al Downing	
1982	KABC	Vin Scully; Jerry Doggett; Ross Porter	KTNQ	Jaime Jarrín; René Cárdenas	KTTV	Vin Scully; Jerry Doggett; Ross Porter	ONTV	Geoff Witcher; Al Downing	
1983	KABC	Vin Scully; Jerry Doggett; Ross Porter	KTNQ	Jaime Jarrín; René Cárdenas	KTTV	Vin Scully; Jerry Doggett; Ross Porter	ONTV	Geoff Witcher; Al Downing	
1984	KABC	Vin Scully; Jerry Doggett; Ross Porter	KTNQ	Jaime Jarrín; René Cárdenas	KTTV	Vin Scully; Jerry Doggett; Ross Porter	ONTV	Eddie Doucette; Al Downing	
1985	KABC	Vin Scully; Jerry Doggett; Ross Porter	KTNQ	Jaime Jarrín; René Cárdenas	KTTV	Vin Scully; Jerry Doggett; Ross Porter	Dodgervision	Eddie Doucette; Al Downing; Rick Monday	
1986	KABC	Vin Scully; Jerry Doggett; Ross Porter	KTNQ	Jaime Jarrín; René Cárdenas	KTTV	Vin Scully; Jerry Doggett; Ross Porter	Dodgervision	Eddie Doucette; Al Downing; Rick Monday	
1987	KABC	Vin Scully; Jerry Doggett; Ross Porter	KWKW	Jaime Jarrín; René Cárdenas	KTTV	Vin Scully; Jerry Doggett; Ross Porter	Dodgervision	Eddie Doucette; Al Downing; Rick Monday	
1988	KABC	Vin Scully; Ross Porter; Don Drysdale	KWKW	Jaime Jarrín; René Cárdenas	KTTV	Vin Scully; Ross Porter; Don Drysdale	Z Channel	Rick Monday; Tony Hernandez	
1989	KABC	Vin Scully; Ross Porter; Don Drysdale	KWKW	Jaime Jarrín; René Cárdenas	KTTV	Vin Scully; Ross Porter; Don Drysdale	Z Channel	Eddie Doucette; Don Sutton	
1990	KABC	Vin Scully; Ross Porter; Don Drysdale	KWKW; KAZN	Jaime Jarrín; René Cárdenas; Tito Rondon; Richard Choi	KTTV	Vin Scully; Ross Porter; Don Drysdale	SportsChannel	Joel Meyers; Ron Cey	
1991	KABC	Vin Scully; Ross Porter; Don Drysdale	KWKW; KAZN	Jaime Jarrín; René Cárdenas; Richard Choi	KTTV	Vin Scully; Ross Porter; Don Drysdale	SportsChannel	Al Downing; Joel Meyers; Duke Snider	
1992	KABC	Vin Scully; Ross Porter; Don Drysdale	KWKW; KYPA	Jaime Jarrín; René Cárdenas; Richard Choi	KTTV	Vin Scully; Ross Porter; Don Drysdale	SportsChannel	Don Drysdale; Ross Porter	
1993	KABC	Vin Scully; Ross Porter; Don Drysdale; Rick Monday	KWKW; KYPA	Jaime Jarrín; René Cárdenas; Richard Choi	KTLA	Vin Scully; Ross Porter; Don Drysdale; Rick Monday	None	None	
1994	KABC	Vin Scully; Ross Porter; Rick Monday	KWKW; KYPA	Jaime Jarrín; René Cárdenas; Richard Choi	KTLA	Vin Scully; Ross Porter; Rick Monday	None	None	
1995	KABC	Vin Scully; Ross Porter; Rick Monday	KWKW; KYPA	Jaime Jarrín; René Cárdenas; Richard Choi	KTLA	Vin Scully; Ross Porter; Rick Monday	None	None	
1996	KABC	Vin Scully; Ross Porter; Rick Monday	KWKW; KYPA	Jaime Jarrín; René Cárdenas; Richard Choi	KTLA	Vin Scully; Ross Porter; Rick Monday	None	None	
1997	KABC	Vin Scully; Ross Porter; Rick Monday	KWKW; KYPA	Jaime Jarrín; René Cárdenas; Richard Choi	KTLA	Vin Scully; Ross Porter; Rick Monday	Fox Sports West 2	Vin Scully; Ross Porter	
1998	KXTA	Vin Scully; Ross Porter; Rick Monday	KWKW; KYPA	Jaime Jarrín; René Cárdenas; Pepe Yñiguez; Richard Choi	KTLA	Vin Scully; Ross Porter; Rick Monday	Fox Sports West 2	Vin Scully; Ross Porter	
1999	KXTA	Vin Scully; Ross Porter; Rick Monday	KWKW; KYPA	Jaime Jarrín; Pepe Yñiguez; Richard Choi	KTLA	Vin Scully; Ross Porter; Rick Monday	FS Net West 2	Vin Scully; Ross Porter; Rick Monday	
2000	KXTA	Vin Scully; Ross Porter; Rick Monday	KWKW	Jaime Jarrín; Pepe Yñiguez	KTLA	Vin Scully; Ross Porter; Rick Monday	FSN West 2	Vin Scully; Ross Porter; Rick Monday	
2001	KXTA	Vin Scully; Ross Porter; Rick Monday	KWKW	Jaime Jarrín; Pepe Yñiguez	KTLA	Vin Scully; Ross Porter; Rick Monday	FSN West 2	Vin Scully; Ross Porter; Rick Monday	
2002	KXTA	Vin Scully; Ross Porter; Rick Monday	KWKW	Jaime Jarrín; Pepe Yñiguez	KCOP-TV	Vin Scully; Ross Porter; Rick Monday	FSN West 2	Vin Scully; Ross Porter; Rick Monday	
2003	KFWB	Vin Scully; Ross Porter; Rick Monday	KWKW	Jaime Jarrín; Pepe Yñiguez	KCOP-TV	Vin Scully; Ross Porter; Rick Monday	FSN West 2	Vin Scully; Ross Porter; Rick Monday	
2004	KFWB	Vin Scully; Ross Porter; Rick Monday	KWKW	Jaime Jarrín; Pepe Yñiguez; Fernando Valenzuela	KCOP-TV	Vin Scully; Ross Porter; Rick Monday	FSN West 2	Vin Scully; Ross Porter; Rick Monday	
2005	KFWB	Vin Scully; Rick Monday; Charley Steiner; Al Downing	KWKW	Jaime Jarrín; Pepe Yñiguez; Fernando Valenzuela	KCOP-TV; KCAL-TV	Vin Scully; Rick Monday; Charley Steiner; Steve Lyons	FSN West 2	Vin Scully; Rick Monday; Charley Steiner; Steve Lyons	
2006	KFWB	Vin Scully; Rick Monday; Charley Steiner; Jerry Reuss	KWKW	Jaime Jarrín; Pepe Yñiguez; Fernando Valenzuela	KCAL-TV	Vin Scully; Charley Steiner; Steve Lyons	FSN West 2	Vin Scully; Charley Steiner; Steve Lyons	
2007	KFWB	Vin Scully; Rick Monday; Charley Steiner	KWKW	Jaime Jarrín; Pepe Yñiguez; Fernando Valenzuela	KCAL-TV	Vin Scully; Charley Steiner; Steve Lyons	FSN PrimeTicket	Vin Scully; Charley Steiner; Steve Lyons	
2008	KABC	Vin Scully; Rick Monday; Charley Steiner	KHJ	Jaime Jarrín; Pepe Yñiguez; Fernando Valenzuela	KCAL-TV	Vin Scully; Charley Steiner; Steve Lyons	FSN PrimeTicket	Vin Scully; Charley Steiner; Steve Lyons	
2009	KABC	Vin Scully; Rick Monday; Charley Steiner	KHJ	Jaime Jarrín; Pepe Yñiguez; Fernando Valenzuela	KCAL-TV	Vin Scully; Eric Collins; Steve Lyons	FSN PrimeTicket	Vin Scully; Eric Collins; Steve Lyons	
2010	KABC	Vin Scully; Rick Monday; Charley Steiner	KHJ	Jaime Jarrín; Pepe Yñiguez; Fernando Valenzuela	KCAL-TV	Vin Scully; Eric Collins; Steve Lyons	FSN PrimeTicket	Vin Scully; Eric Collins; Steve Lyons; Spanish Broadcasts: Manny Mota	
2011	KABC	Vin Scully; Rick Monday; Charley Steiner	KTNQ	Jaime Jarrín; Pepe Yñiguez; Fernando Valenzuela	KCAL-TV	Vin Scully; Eric Collins; Steve Lyons	FSN PrimeTicket	Vin Scully; Eric Collins; Steve Lyons; Spanish Broadcasts: Manny Mota	
2012	KLAC	Vin Scully; Rick Monday; Charley Steiner	KTNQ	Jaime Jarrín; Pepe Yñiguez; Fernando Valenzuela	KCAL-TV	Vin Scully; Eric Collins; Steve Lyons	FSN PrimeTicket	Vin Scully; Eric Collins; Steve Lyons; Spanish Broadcasts: Manny Mota; Jorge Jarrín	
2013	KLAC	Vin Scully; Rick Monday; Charley Steiner	KTNQ	Jaime Jarrín; Pepe Yñiguez; Fernando Valenzuela	KCAL-TV	Vin Scully; Eric Collins; Steve Lyons	FSN PrimeTicket	Vin Scully; Eric Collins; Steve Lyons; Spanish Broadcasts: Manny Mota; Jorge Jarrín	
2014	KLAC	Vin Scully; Rick Monday; Charley Steiner; Nomar Garciaparra; Kevin Kennedy	KTNQ	Jaime Jarrín; Pepe Yñiguez; Fernando Valenzuela	KDOC (SportsNet simulcast - last 6 games only)	Vin Scully	SportsNet LA	Vin Scully; Charley Steiner; Orel Hershiser; Nomar Garciaparra; Spanish Broadcasts: Manny Mota; Jorge Jarrín	
2015	KLAC	Vin Scully; Rick Monday; Charley Steiner; Kevin Kennedy	KTNQ	Jaime Jarrín; Jorge Jarrín	None	None	SportsNet LA	Vin Scully; Charley Steiner; Orel Hershiser; Nomar Garciaparra; Spanish Broadcasts: Pepe Yñiguez; Fernando Valenzuela; Manny Mota	
2016	KLAC	Vin Scully; Rick Monday; Charley Steiner; Kevin Kennedy	KTNQ	Jaime Jarrín; Jorge Jarrín	KTLA (SportsNet simulcast - last week of season only)	None	SportsNet LA	Vin Scully; Joe Davis; Charley Steiner; Orel Hershiser; Nomar Garciaparra; Spanish Broadcasts: Pepe Yñiguez; Fernando Valenzuela; Manny Mota	
2017	KLAC	Charley Steiner; Rick Monday; Kevin Kennedy	KTNQ	Jaime Jarrín; Jorge Jarrín	KTLA (SportsNet simulcast)	None	SportsNet LA	Joe Davis; Charley Steiner; Orel Hershiser; Nomar Garciaparra; Joe Davis; Spanish Broadcasts: Pepe Yñiguez; Fernando Valenzuela; Manny Mota	
2018	KLAC	Charley Steiner; Rick Monday; Kevin Kennedy	KTNQ	Jaime Jarrín; Jorge Jarrín	KTLA (SportsNet simulcast)	None	SportsNet LA	Joe Davis; Charley Steiner; Orel Hershiser; Nomar Garciaparra; Spanish Broadcasts: Pepe Yñiguez; Fernando Valenzuela; Manny Mota	
2019	KLAC	Charley Steiner; Rick Monday; Tim Neverett	KTNQ	Jaime Jarrín; Jorge Jarrín	KTLA (SportsNet simulcast)	None	SportsNet LA	Joe Davis; Tim Neverett; Orel Hershiser; Nomar Garciaparra; Spanish Broadcasts: Pepe Yñiguez; Fernando Valenzuela; Manny Mota	
2020	KLAC	Charley Steiner; Rick Monday; Tim Neverett	KTNQ	Jaime Jarrín; Jorge Jarrín	None	None	SportsNet LA	Joe Davis; Tim Neverett; Orel Hershiser; Nomar Garciaparra; Spanish Broadcasts: Pepe Yñiguez; Fernando Valenzuela; Manny Mota	
2021	KLAC	Charley Steiner; Rick Monday; Tim Neverett	KTNQ	Jaime Jarrín	None	None	SportsNet LA	Joe Davis; Tim Neverett; Orel Hershiser; Nomar Garciaparra; Spanish Broadcasts: Pepe Yñiguez; Fernando Valenzuela; Manny Mota	
2022	KLAC	Charley Steiner; Rick Monday; José Mota; Tim Neverett	KTNQ	Jaime Jarrín; José Mota; Pepe Yñiguez; Fernando Valenzuela	None	None	SportsNet LA	Joe Davis; Tim Neverett; Daron Sutton; Orel Hershiser; Nomar Garciaparra; Eric Karros; Jessica Mendoza; Dontrelle Willis; Spanish Broadcasts: Pepe Yñiguez; Fernando Valenzuela; José Mota	
2023	KLAC	Charley Steiner; Rick Monday; Tim Neverett	KTNQ	José Mota; Pepe Yñiguez; Fernando Valenzuela	None	None	SportsNet LA	Joe Davis; Stephen Nelson; Tim Neverett; Orel Hershiser; Nomar Garciaparra; Eric Karros; Jessica Mendoza; Dontrelle Willis; Spanish Broadcasts: Pepe Yñiguez; Fernando Valenzuela; José Mota	
2024	KLAC	Rick Monday; Tim Neverett; Stephen Nelson	KTNQ	José Mota; Pepe Yñiguez; Fernando Valenzuela	None	None	SportsNet LA	Joe Davis; Stephen Nelson; Tim Neverett; Orel Hershiser; Eric Karros; Jessica Mendoza; Spanish Broadcasts: Pepe Yñiguez; Fernando Valenzuela; José Mota	
2025	KLAC	Charley Steiner; Rick Monday; Tim Neverett; Stephen Nelson	KTNQ	José Mota; Pepe Yñiguez; Luis Cruz	None	None	SportsNet LA	Joe Davis; Stephen Nelson; Tim Neverett; Orel Hershiser; Eric Karros; Jessica Mendoza; Spanish Broadcasts: Pepe Yñiguez; José Mota; Luis Cruz	
2026	KLAC	Charley Steiner; Rick Monday; Tim Neverett; Stephen Nelson; James Loney; José Mota	KTNQ	José Mota; Pepe Yñiguez; Luis Cruz	None	None	SportsNet LA	Joe Davis; Stephen Nelson; Orel Hershiser; Eric Karros; Jessica Mendoza; Dontrelle Willis; Clayton Kershaw; Spanish Broadcasts: Pepe Yñiguez; José Mota; Luis Cruz	

== See also ==
- List of current Major League Baseball announcers
- Los Angeles Dodgers Radio Network
