= F. X. Feeney =

American writer and filmmaker (1953–2020)

- Born: September 1, 1953; U.S.
- Died: February 5, 2020 (aged 66)
- Occupations: Writer, filmmaker
- Years active: 1968–2020

Francis Xavier Feeney (September 1, 1953 – February 5, 2020) was an American writer and filmmaker.

== Education and early career ==
After graduating from the California Institute of the Arts in 1976, Feeney worked for several years as an inker and painter at Hanna-Barbera Studios. By 1980 he became a film and book critic for LA Weekly.

Jerry Harvey, chief programmer for the pay TV service Z Channel, noticed a tribute to Warren Oates that Feeney wrote after the actor's sudden death in 1982. Harvey had been the last person to speak to Oates. This led to Feeney serving as a resident film critic and creative consultant to Z Channel between 1983 and 1989, directing dozens of commercials for the service. The ads promoted a number of premieres of director's cuts and "lost films" that were the trademark of Z Channel, most notably Sergio Leone's Once Upon a Time in America, John Ford's Up the River, Karel Reisz's The Loves of Isadora, and Sam Peckinpah's Pat Garrett & Billy the Kid.

== After Z Channel ==
After Z Channel folded, Feeney worked alternately as a screenwriter and freelance journalist. His work has continued to appear in L.A. Weekly, as well as in American Film, Movieline, People Magazine, Variety, Vanity Fair, and the magazine of the Writers Guild of America, West.

Feeney published two book-length essays with Taschen in 2006 about film directors Roman Polanski and Michael Mann. In 2006 and 2007, he became a creative consultant to ClickStar, a movie download service founded by Morgan Freeman, constituted on the Z Channel model. He died after a stroke on February 5, 2020.

== Movies ==
His screen credits include Z Channel: A Magnificent Obsession (2004), which he co-produced for director Xan Cassavetes, recounts the story with particular attention to the tragic life of Jerry Harvey. Other films include The Big Brass Ring (1999), which he adapted from an unproduced script by Orson Welles for director George Hickenlooper; and Frankenstein Unbound (1989), which he adapted from a novel by Brian Aldiss, for director Roger Corman.

== Books ==
- 2015: Orson Welles: Power, Heart and Soul. Raleigh, North Carolina: The Critical Press, 2015. ISBN 978-1941629086
- 2009: Movie Icons: Pacino. Taschen, 2009. ISBN 978-3836508568
- 2009: Movie Icons: J. Depp. Taschen, 2009. ISBN 978-3836508490
- 2008: Movie Icons: Hepburn. Taschen, 2008. ISBN 978-1435107144
- 2008: Movie Icons: Presley. Taschen, 2008. ISBN 978-3822823231
- 2007: Movie Icons: Grant. Taschen, 2007. ISBN 978-3822822128
- 2007: Movie Icons: Dean. Taschen, 2007. ISBN 978-3822822203
- 2006: Movie Icons: Brando. Taschen, 2006. ISBN 978-3822820025
- 2006: Movie Icons: Welles. Taschen, 2006. ISBN 978-3822820032
- 2006: Roman Polanski. Taschen, 2006. ISBN 978-3822825426
- 2006: Michael Mann. Taschen, 2006. ISBN 978-3822831410
