= China 9, Liberty 37 =

1978 Italian-Spanish Western film directed by Monte Hellman

China 9, Liberty 37 (Amore piombo e furore)
- Italian film poster
- Directed by: Monte Hellman
- Screenplay by: Jerry Harvey; Douglas Venturelli; Ennio De Concini; Don Vicente Escrivá
- Story by: Jerry Harvey; Douglas Venturelli
- Produced by: Gianni Bozzacchi; Valerio De Paolis; Monte Hellman
- Starring: Fabio Testi; Warren Oates; Jenny Agutter; Isabel Mestres; Franco Interlenghi; Paco Benlloch; Gianrico Tondinelli; Charly Bravo; Sam Peckinpah
- Cinematography: Giuseppe Rotunno
- Edited by: Cesare D'Amico
- Music by: Pino Donaggio
- Production companies: Compagnia Europea Cinematografica; Aspa Producciones
- Distributed by: Fida International Films
- Release date: 1978
- Running time: 92 minutes
- Countries: Italy; Spain
- Language: Italian

China 9, Liberty 37 (Italian: Amore piombo e furore, "Love, Lead, and Fury") is an Italian-Spanish 1978 Western film directed by Monte Hellman, starring Warren Oates, Jenny Agutter, and Fabio Testi. Noted director Sam Peckinpah has a small, rare acting role. The film was shot in locations in Spain and Italy by cinematographer Giuseppe Rotunno. Pino Donaggio composed the musical score. The English title refers to a sign seen at the beginning of the movie on U.S. Route 90 in Beaumont, Texas. Monte Hellman, utilized the scenic location of the highway to enhance the authenticity of its setting. The film had a very sparse theatrical release in the United States, and did not play in some cities until as late as 1984.

== Plot ==
Gunslinger Clayton Drumm is in jail, about to be hanged, when railroad company men offer him a chance to live if he will agree to murder Matthew Sebanek, a miner who has steadfastly refused to sell his land to the railroad. Instead, Drumm befriends Sebanek and has an affair with Sebanek's wife. Sebanek discovers the affair and joins with the railroad men to hunt down the couple.

== Cast ==
- Warren Oates as Matthew Sebanek
- Fabio Testi as Clayton Drumm/Braun
- Jenny Agutter as Catherine Sebanek
- Sam Peckinpah as Wilbur Olsen
- Isabel Mestres as Barbara Sebanek
- Gianrico Tondinelli as Johnny Sebanek
- Franco Interlenghi as Hank Sebanek
- Charly Bravo as Duke
- Paco Benlloch as Virgil Sebanek
- Sydney Lassick as sheriff's friend
- Richard C. Adams as sheriff
- Natalie Kim as Cassie
- Ivonne Sentis as prostitute
- Romano Puppo as Zeb
- Luis Prendes as Williams
- Helga Liné as Mrs. Cottrell
- Mattieu Ettori as Cottrell
- David Thomson as Jack
- Daniel Panes as Joe
- Piero Fondi as Tanner
- Tony Brandt as Jefferson
- Luciano Spadoni as hangman
- Frank Clement as Tom
- Jose Murillo as Jimmy
- Rafael Albaicin as prison guard
- Luis Barboo as Henry
- Freda Lorente as Lady Godiva

== Versions ==
A 102-minute DVD release was made by Synergy Ent on 29 May 2007.

The full 98-minute director's cut, containing nudity, in English language and original scope, has been broadcast by TCM.

Clips of the film can be seen in the documentary Z Channel: A Magnificent Obsession.
