= Catherine Corman =

American photographer and filmmaker

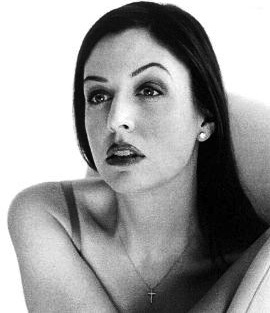
- Catherine Corman
- Born: Catherine Ann Corman; 1975 (age 49–50); Los Angeles
- Education: Harvard University, University of Oxford
- Relatives: Roger Corman (father); Julie Corman (mother)
- Website: catherine-corman.com

Catherine Ann Corman (born 1975) is an American photographer and filmmaker.

Her short film Lost Horizon, based on the work of Nobel Laureate Patrick Modiano, was invited to the Cannes Film Festival and long-listed for an Academy Award. Little Jewel, her short film also based on Modiano’s work, was long-listed for an Academy Award. Her short film Les Non-Dupes screened at the Berlin Biennale. Her book of photographs, Daylight Noir: Raymond Chandler's Imagined City, was exhibited at the Venice Biennale and is included in the collection of the Museum of Modern Art Library. Her book Photographs of the Saints was honored at Paris Photo. Romanticism, her book of collage poems and photographs, was nominated for a Pushcart Prize. She is also the editor of Joseph Cornell’s Dreams.

Her work has appeared in The New Yorker, The Times Literary Supplement, The Paris Review, The Economist, and Vogue Italia.

Educated at Harvard and Oxford Universities, she lives in New York City. She is the daughter of film director Roger Corman, and appears in his film Frankenstein Unbound playing the role of Justine.
