= Adrian Martin (film critic) =

Australian film and arts critic (born 1959)

- Born: Adrian Paul Martin; 1959 (age 66–67); Melbourne, Australia
- Occupation: Film critic
- Years active: 1979-present
- Website: https://adrianmartinfilmcritic.com/

Adrian Martin (born 1959) is an Australian film and arts critic. He now lives in Malgrat de Mar in Spain. He is Adjunct Associate Professor in Film Culture and Theory at Monash University. His work has appeared in many magazines, journals and newspapers around the world, and has been translated into over twenty languages and has regular columns in the Dutch De Filmkrant and in Caimán Cuadernos de Cine.

== Early life and education ==
Born in Melbourne, Martin was educated at St Joseph's College, Melbourne and Melbourne State College, where he studied film and media studies in the late 1970s. He later completed a PhD in Film Style at Monash University in 2006. His thesis, titled Toward a Synthetic Analysis of Film Style, won the Mollie Holman Doctoral Medal for Best PhD Thesis in the Faculty of Arts and Design.

== Career ==
Martin began teaching in 1979, and has lectured in film studies at Melbourne State College, Swinburne University of Technology, Rusden College and RMIT University. After completing his PhD, Martin was a senior research fellow in film and television studies at Monash University from 2006 to 2009, and was promoted to associate professor in 2010.

Martin was one of The Age newspaper's film reviewers for 11 years until early 2006 and has worked as a film reviewer for ABC TV and Radio National. He was co-editor of the online film journal Rouge between 2003 and 2009, and co-editor, with Girish Shambu, of the online film journal Lola from 2011 to 2016. He also serves as one of the editorial team of Screening The Past.

From 2013 to 2015, Martin was distinguished visiting professor at Goethe University in Frankfurt, Germany.

In July 2017 he launched his official website Film Critic: Adrian Martin.

== Audio commentaries ==
From 2006 to 2011, Martin contributed feature-length audio commentaries to the 'Directors Suite' DVD series produced by Madman Entertainment in Australia. Madman discontinued producing these special bonus features in 2011. In 2015, Martin returned to audio commentary work, commissioned by the British Film Institute and Masters of Cinema labels. Martin's commentary appears on the following films (release dates follow each title):

- Vivre sa vie (Godard, July 2006; commentary re-used by Criterion USA, 2010)
- The Exterminating Angel (Buñuel, September 2006)
- Masculin Féminin (Godard, December 2006)
- Two or Three Things I Know About Her (Godard, December 2006; commentary re-used by Criterion USA, 2009)
- The Promise (Dardennes, March 2007)
- Dr. Mabuse the Gambler (Lang, July 2007)
- The Blue Angel (Sternberg, August 2007)
- Alice in the Cities (in box set of Wenders' Road Movies, October 2007)
- Journey in Italy (Rossellini, November 2007)
- Gertrud (Dreyer, February 2008)
- The Tarnished Angels (Sirk, May 2008)
- Martha (in Fassbinder box set on Melodrama, December 2008)
- There's Always Tomorrow (Sirk, co-commentary with John Flaus, Feb 2009)
- Beware of a Holy Whore (Fassbinder, Feb 2009)
- Les Cousins (Chabrol, Feb 2009, re-used by Criterion, USA)
- Ministry of Fear (Lang, March 2009)
- Fallen Angel (Preminger, April 2009) Re-released BFI, 2015
- Whirlpool (Preminger, April 2009) Re-released BFI, 2015
- F for Fake (Welles, June 2009)
- Le Plaisir (Ophüls, 2009)
- Madame de... (Ophüls, 2009)
- Good Morning (Ozu, co-commentary with John Flaus, 2009)
- A Married Woman (Godard, 2009)
- Le gai savoir (Godard, 2009)
- La Luna (Bertolucci, 2009)
- Le Corbeau (Clouzot, 2010)
- Touchez pas au grisbi (Becker, 2010)
- Elena and Her Men (Renoir, 2010)
- The Loyal 47 Ronin (Mizoguchi, 2010)
- The Immortal Story (Welles, 2010, reused by Criterion, USA)
- Diary of a Chambermaid (Buñuel, 2010)
- Lola Montès (Ophüls, 2010)
- Histoire(s) du cinéma (Godard, scholarly edition overseen by Martin, 2011)
- Seconds (Frankenheimer - Masters of Cinema, 2015)
- Night and the City (Dassin - BFI, 2015)
- Where the Sidewalk Ends (Preminger - BFI, 2015)
- Fixed Bayonets! (Fuller - Masters of Cinema, 2016)
- Bande à part (Godard - BFI, 2016)
- Man with a Movie Camera (Vertov - Masters of Cinema, 2016)
- Cry of the City (Siodmak - BFI, 2016)
- Paths of Glory (Kubrick - Masters of Cinema, 2016; reissued 2024)
- Paris Blues (Ritt - BFI, 2016)
- Carmen Jones (Preminger - BFI, September 2016)
- The Man from Laramie (Mann - Masters of Cinema, December 2016)
- The Wages of Fear (Clouzot – BFI, June 2017; reissued 2024)
- Le gai savoir (Godard – Kino Lorber, October 2017, new commentary by Martin, not the 2009 version)
- Operation Petticoat (Edwards – Olive, November 2017)
- Céline and Julie Go Boating (Rivette – BFI, November 2017, re-used by Criterion, 2021)
- The Dark Mirror (Siodmak – Arrow Film Noir box, November 2017)
- Ramrod (De Toth – Arrow, March 2018)
- The Effect of Gamma Rays on Man-in-the-Moon Marigolds (Newman – Indicator, April 2018)
- The Passenger (Antonioni – Indicator, April 2018)
- Girl with Green Eyes (Davis – BFI Woodfall box, June 2018)
- Paris nous appartient (Rivette – BFI, September 2018)
- Bob & Carol & Ted & Alice (Mazursky – Arrow, October 2018)
- Red, White and Zero (Brook/Anderson/Richardson – BFI, November 2018)
- Hold Back the Dawn (Leisen – Arrow, 2019)
- The Big Clock (Farrow – Arrow, May 2019)
- The Far Country (Mann – Arrow, 2019)
- People on Sunday (Siodmak/Ulmer – BFI, June 2019)
- Blonde Venus (Sternberg – Indicator boxset, August 2019)
- The Major and the Minor (Wilder – Arrow, September 2019)
- Criss Cross (Siodmak – Masters of Cinema, 2020)
- Five Graves to Cairo (Wilder – Eureka, August 2020)
- This Gun for Hire (Tuttle – Masters of Cinema, September 2020)
- Mademoiselle (Richardson – BFI, 2020)
- Waxworks (Leni – Masters of Cinema/Flicker Alley, 2020)
- Crash (Cronenberg – Arrow, 2020)
- City of Fear (Lerner – Columbia Noir #3, Indicator, 2021)
- The Spy Who Came In from the Cold (Ritt – Masters of Cinema, 2021)
- Days of Heaven (Malick – ViaVision, 2021)
- Johnny Guitar (Ray – Eureka, 2021)
- Ned Kelly (Richardson – ViaVision, 2021)
- Les Enfants terribles (Melville – BFI, 2021)
- Faithless (Ullmann – BFI, 2022)
- Mortal Thoughts (Rudolph – ViaVision, 2022)
- On the Beach (Kramer – ViaVision, 2022)
- Kuhle Wampe (Dudow – BFI, 2022)
- Remember the Night (Leisen – Indicator, 2022)
- The Man Who Loved Women (Edwards – Umbrella, 2023)
- There's No Tomorrow (Ophüls – Kino Lorber, May 2023)
- Time Out of Mind (Siodmak – Indicator, June 2023; Universal Noir Vol. 2)
- A Hen in the Wind (Ozu – BFI, 2023)
- The Aviator's Wife (Rohmer – Kino Lorber, October 2023)
- My Girlfriend's Boyfriend (Rohmer – Kino Lorber, 2023)
- La Guerre est finie, co-commentator Cristina Álvarez López (Resnais – The Film Desk, November 2023)
- The Group (Lumet – ViaVision, December 2023; Lumet box Vol. 1)
- The Fugitive Kind (Lumet – ViaVision, December 2023; Brando box)
- The Road to Shame (Molinaro – Kino Lorber, February 2024)
- There Was a Father (Ozu – BFI, April 2024)
- I Was Born, But... (Ozu – BFI, April 2024)
- American Gigolo (Schrader – Arrow, June 2024)
- The North Star (Milestone – Kino Lorber, June 2024)
- Floating Clouds (Naruse – BFI, July 2024)
- The Hairdresser's Husband (Leconte – Kino Lorber, July 2024)
- The Apartment (Mimouni – Kino Lorber, August 2024)
- Ikiru (Kurosawa – BFI, August 2024)
- Two Weeks in September (Bourguignon – Kino Lorber, September 2024)
- The Lady is Willing (Leisen – Indicator, September 2024)
- Seven Samurai (Kurosawa – BFI, November 2024)
- Mountains of the Moon (Rafelson – Kino Lorber, November 2024)
- At Close Range (Foley – Arrow, December 2024)
- Child's Play (Lumet – Vinegar Syndrome, January 2025)
- The Canyons (Schrader – Vinegar Syndrome, January 2025)
- Peter Ibbetson (Hathaway – Indicator, February 2025)
- In the Bedroom (Field – Imprint, March 2025)

== Awards ==
- 1993: Byron Kennedy Award, Australian Film Institute Awards
- 1997: Pascall Prize for Australian Critic of the Year
- 2006: Mollie Holman Doctoral Medal, Monash University
- 2018: Australian Film Critics Association (AFCA) Ivan Hutchinson award for "Best Long-form Writing on Australian or International Cinema"

== Bibliography ==
- Phantasms (1994)
- Once upon a Time in America (1998) BFI Modern Classics Series
- The Mad Max Movies (2003)
- Movie Mutations: The Changing Face of World Cinephilia (2003) co-edited with Jonathan Rosenbaum, BFI
- Raúl Ruiz: Sublimes Obsesiones (2004, Altamira, Argentina)
- ¿Qué Es el Cine Moderno? (2008), a selection of 21 essays from the period 1998–2008, in Spanish translation. Published by Valdivia International Film Festival and Uqbar editores (Chile)
- Last Day Every Day (punctum books, USA: English version 2012, Spanish edition co-published by punctum/FICUNAM, translated by Cristina Álvarez López 2013; expanded Portuguese version 2015)
- Mise en Scène and Film Style: From Classical Hollywood to New Media Art (Palgrave, 2014)
- Mysteries of Cinema (Amsterdam University Press, 2018; University of Western Australia Publishing 2020)
- Filmmakers Thinking (San Sebastián: EQZE, 2022 / Sticking Place Books, USA, 2024)

== Filmography ==
- Love and Other Catastrophes (1996), as himself
