= Frankenstein Unbound =

1990 film by Roger Corman

Roger Corman's Frankenstein Unbound
- Theatrical release poster
- Directed by: Roger Corman
- Screenplay by: Roger Corman; F. X. Feeney
- Based on: Frankenstein Unbound by Brian W. Aldiss
- Produced by: Roger Corman; Thom Mount; Kobi Jaeger
- Starring: John Hurt; Raul Julia; Bridget Fonda; Jason Patric; Michael Hutchence; Nick Brimble
- Cinematography: Armando Nannuzzi; Michael Scott
- Edited by: Jay Cassidy; Mary Bauer
- Music by: Carl Davis
- Production companies: The Mount Company; Byron Films; Concorde Pictures
- Distributed by: 20th Century Fox (United States and Canada); Warner Bros. (International)
- Release date: November 2, 1990
- Running time: 85 minutes
- Country: United States
- Language: English
- Budget: $11.5 million
- Box office: $335,000 (United States and Canada)

Roger Corman's Frankenstein Unbound (or simply Frankenstein Unbound) is a 1990 American science fiction horror film directed, co-written, and produced by Roger Corman. Based on Brian W. Aldiss's 1973 novel Frankenstein Unbound, the film serves as Corman's return to directing after a fifteen-year hiatus as well as his final directing role before his death in 2024. The cast includes John Hurt, Raul Julia, Bridget Fonda, Jason Patric, Michael Hutchence and Nick Brimble.

The story follows Dr. Buchanan, a scientist in the futuristic year of 2031, who invents the prototype of a powerful weapon. However, the invention inadvertently creates rifts in space and time—one of which Buchanan is caught into. Buchanan lands in Switzerland in 1817, where he meets Victor Frankenstein, another scientist with a creation gone awry.

Frankenstein Unbound was released by 20th Century Fox domestically and Warner Bros. internationally. The film was both a financial and critical disappointment.

== Plot ==
In 2031, Dr. Buchanan and his team work to develop the ultimate weapon, an energy beam that will completely remove whatever it is aimed at. Buchanan hopes he can create a weapon so powerful that it will end all war and have the added benefit of having no impact on the environment. Unfortunately, the prototype has unpredictable side effects, creating erratic global weather patterns and rifts in space and time that have caused some people to vanish. As he drives home from the testing facility, Buchanan himself is caught in one such rift.

Buchanan and his futuristic computer-controlled car reappear in Switzerland in 1817. In a village, he meets Victor Frankenstein. The men discuss science over dinner and it is revealed that Frankenstein's young brother has been killed. A trial is to determine the guilt or innocence of the boy's nanny, who is suspected of murder.

Several villagers claim to have seen a monster in the woods and suggest this is the killer. Buchanan observes the trial and becomes interested in a young woman taking notes. She turns out to be Mary Shelley, author of Frankenstein. Shelley gives credence to the talk of monsters, but the judge does not. The nanny is found guilty and sentenced to die on the gallows. Buchanan knows the monster killed the child. He implores Frankenstein to come forward and reveal the truth, but Frankenstein refuses. Buchanan then asks Shelley for help, telling her that he is from the future. They are attracted to each other, but Mary, fearing to know too much about the future and her own destiny, chooses not to become involved. Buchanan is on his own. He drives his car to Frankenstein's workshop and finds the doctor in discussion with the monster.

The monster has killed Frankenstein's fiancé, saying that if a mate was not made for him then he would deprive Frankenstein of his. Frankenstein asks Buchanan to use his knowledge of electricity to assist in resurrecting the dead woman. Buchanan instructs the monster to run cables to a weather vane on the roof. While the monster is distracted, Buchanan re-routes some of the electrical cables to begin powering up the prototype laser in his car.

As the lightning strikes the tower, again and again, the battery on the laser begins to charge and the corpse on the table begins to move. At the same moment, the woman is restored to life and Buchanan's energy beam is fully charged; he fires. The castle is destroyed.

But the laser opens another space-time rift, sending Buchanan, Frankenstein, and the two monsters far into the future. They land on a snowy mountain with no sign of civilization. Frankenstein and the monster both try to entice the woman to them, only to have her force Frankenstein to shoot and kill her. Enraged, the monster kills Frankenstein and trudges off into the snowstorm. Buchanan follows, hoping to kill the monster before he reaches a city and kills again.

Eventually, the monster is cornered in a cave filled with computers and machines. When Buchanan enters, the machines chirp to life and a voice says, "Welcome back, Dr. Buchanan." The monster tells Buchanan that the cave is the central brain for the nearby city, the last one remaining after the world has been devastated by Buchanan's ultimate weapon. Buchanan engages security devices and the monster is burned to death by lasers. Buchanan makes his way to the nearby city through the snow.

As he walks, the monster's voice is heard saying that he cannot truly be killed, for now, he is "unbound."

== Cast ==
- John Hurt as Joe Buchanan / The Narrator
- Raul Julia as Dr. Victor Frankenstein
- Bridget Fonda as Mary Shelley
- Nick Brimble as Frankenstein's monster
- Catherine Rabett as Elizabeth Lavenza
- Jason Patric as Lord Byron
- Michael Hutchence as Percy Shelley
- Catherine Corman as Justine Moritz
- Mickey Knox as General Reade
- Terri Treas as The Voice of Computer

== Production ==
Producer Thom Mount approached Roger Corman with the idea to get him back into directing after a two decade absence. Corman was paid $1 million to direct. To get a strong script, Corman looked to known writers including Wes Craven and Floyd Mutrux to craft something original before ultimately having F.X. Feeney adapt Brian Aldiss' novel Frankenstein Unbound with input from Corman himself. Ed Neumeier reportedly worked on the screenplay but was not credited, although some contemporary reviews listed him as a writer.

20th Century Fox acquired North American rights to the filmn while Warner Bros. Pictures acquired international rights; in the United Kingdom, Blue Dolphin distributed the film theatrically while Warner obtained the UK home video rights to the film. It went into the video markets in February, three months after its release in theaters.

Australian singer Michael Hutchence from INXS was cast as Percy Shelley. Filming occurred in Italy, including in Milan and around Bellagio.

== Reception ==
On the review aggregator website Rotten Tomatoes, the film has a 50% approval rating based on 18 reviews, with an average rating of 5.20/10. Vincent Canby of The New York Times wrote "The movie ... looks fine, and the performers are mostly good. ... Mr. Brimble's Monster looks the way Alexander Godunov might look after a failed face-lift. The special effects are nicely spaced out, and the laugh lines fairly funny." Jonathan Rosenbaum called it a "metaphysical reflection on technology with SF and monster-movie trimmings is packed with wit, originality, and eccentricity." Kevin Thomas of The Los Angeles Times gave mixed praise, noting its romantic horror evoking memory of the Corman-Poe films, calling it "a film of some wit and style but of far more reflection than excitement"

It performed poorly at the box office, grossing nearly $335,000. According to Brian Aldiss, he went to see the film in a cinema in Leicester Square and there were only 6 other people in the audience.

== See also ==
- List of films featuring Frankenstein's monster
