= Film Geek (2023 film) =

2023 video essay

- Directed by: Richard Shepard
- Produced by: Stacey Reiss
- Release date: 2023
- Country: United States
- Language: English

Film Geek is a 2023 video essay documentary by Richard Shepard.

== Summary ==
Shepard recalls his love of movies while growing up in New York City through more than 200 films he saw in movie houses during the late 1970s through the early 1980s alongside his efforts as an 8mm filmmaker and his mysterious relationship with his movie-loving father.

== Production ==
The drawings of the 22 movie theaters from the director's youth that were featured in the film were done by artist Skip Kurtz (who the film's producer Stacey Reiss found on Instagram.)

== See also ==
- Cinephilia
- Vulgar auteurism
- New Hollywood
