= Z Channel: A Magnificent Obsession =

2004 documentary film directed by Alexandra Cassavetes

- Directed by: Xan Cassavetes
- Starring: Jerry Harvey; Robert Altman; Jacqueline Bisset; Theresa Russell; Quentin Tarantino; F. X. Feeney
- Music by: Steven Hufsteter
- Country of origin: United States
- Original language: English

Production
- Producers: Marshall Persinger; Rick Ross
- Cinematography: John Pirozzi
- Editor: Iain Kennedy
- Running time: 122 minutes

Original release
- Release: 2004

Z Channel: A Magnificent Obsession is a 2004 documentary film about Los Angeles pay cable channel Z Channel which was directed by Xan Cassavetes, daughter of Hollywood director and actor John Cassavetes. It was screened out of competition at the 2004 Cannes Film Festival.

The documentary is about Z Channel, which was one of the early pay cable TV stations in the United States. Z Channel became famous for showing an eclectic variety of films, including foreign language, silent, documentary, director's cut, forgotten, overlooked, under-appreciated, erotic as well as mainstream films, without commercials and uncut and letterboxed when possible.

The film also tells the story of Z Channel's programming director Jerry Harvey who was a film lover, programming genius, and a man almost single-handedly responsible for getting many great films shown to the public. It gives insights into Harvey's constant battle with personal demons, which resulted in him ending his life and the life of his wife in a murder-suicide.

Throughout the film a variety of footage featuring some of the films shown on the Z Channel is used. This serves to underline the diversity offered on the channel in particular its attempts to expose its American viewers to undubbed foreign language films.

The films ends with a montage of scenes of such films with Irving Berlin's "What'll I Do?" theme being played over the top of them as performed by the actor William Atherton from the film The Great Gatsby (1974).

== People interviewed for the film ==
- Robert Altman
- Alexander Payne
- Quentin Tarantino
- Jacqueline Bisset
- Theresa Russell
- Jim Jarmusch
- Stuart Cooper
- F. X. Feeney
- Penelope Spheeris
- James Woods
- Henry Jaglom
- Vilmos Zsigmond
- James B. Harris

== Selected films featured on Z Channel ==
- Heaven's Gate
- Once Upon a Time in America
- Overlord
- Pat Garrett and Billy The Kid
- McCabe and Mrs. Miller
- Das Boot
- The Wild Bunch
- The Leopard
- 1900
- That Most Important Thing: Love
- Ride the High Country
- Salvador
- Black Orpheus
- Paths of Glory
- My Darling Clementine

== Reception ==
Z Channel has an overall approval rating of 100% on Rotten Tomatoes.

On Metacritic, the film scored 85/100, based on 4 critics.

== Home media ==
The film was released to DVD in 2004 as a 2-disc special edition, which included numerous bonus features. A standard 1-disc edition followed in 2005.

It was made available on Shout! Cult June 2022 and Criterion Channel in July 2024.

== See also ==
- Cinephilia
- 2004 in film
- The Snob's Dictionary - The channel mentioned in the Film Snob edition
