= Girish Shambu =

Girish Shambu is an American film blogger, cinephile, film critic and educator.

Besides maintaining an eponymous blog, which has become a popular center for the film blogging community, Shambu has contributed writing to including Senses of Cinema, Artforum, Cineaste and The Auteurs' Notebook.

== Biography ==
Girish Shambu received a B. Tech. in chemical engineering from the Indian Institute of Technology in Kharagpur, India and a Ph.D. in management systems / computer science from the State University of New York at Buffalo. Shambu teaches management at Canisius College, and has been the recipient of the Donald E. Calvert Teaching Excellence Award twice.

Shambu began blogging on film in 2004, and within a few years has become one of the most popular of a growing community of devoted cinephiles writing online. In an interview for a sub-site of the film criticism website The House Next Door in 2006, Shambu named Pauline Kael's review of Brian De Palma's Dressed to Kill, James Monaco's book on the French New Wave (which he read several times before he had ever seen a French film), J. Hoberman's Vulgar Modernism and the website of cinephile Acquarello as having had a formative influence on his interest in film.

In August 2011, as co-editor with Adrian Martin, Shambu launched the film journal LOLA.
