= Gill Industries Television =

- Industry: Cable television
- Founded: 1967 in San Jose, California, U.S.
- Headquarters: United States
- Area served: San Jose, California
- Owner: Allen T. Gilliland; Allen T. Gilliland Jr.
- Parent: Heritage Communications Inc.

Gill Industries Television was an American cable television company.

The San Jose Gill cable system gave service to roughly 110,000 subscribers and at the time was the biggest independently-owned cable television system in the United States.

== Early years ==
KNTV was a television station that was the first based in San Jose, California, operated by Standard Radio and Television Corporation, and owned by Allen T. Gilliland.

In 1960, Allen T. Gilliland died and ownership of KNTV was controlled by executors of his estate, including his son Allen T. Gilliland Jr. Gilliland Jr. got majority ownership of KNTV in August 1966 and later operated KNTV as part of Gill Industries, that controlled San Jose's cable television system.

In 1967, Gill Cable built what was thought to be the first dual-channel cable system which got around the channel capacity limitations of customer and cable equipment. RF A/B switches allowed subscribers to choose which cable would provide these services.

== Later years ==
In 1978, Gill Industries sold KNTV to Landmark Communications in Norfolk, Virginia.

== The G Channel ==
Gill Industries Television included a movie channel for cable subscribers, The G Channel.

On April 3, 1979, Sam Ewing was made media services director for Gill Cable where he supervised an eight-to-ten person staff. Ewing's duties included scheduling, selection, ordering and promotion of films for The G Channel.

Del Henry was later hired for a special project for Gill Cable to boost subscribers, study pay television systems, and work with film companies to get movie programming. Henry stated in a 2000 interview that he booked the debut showing of the film Gone with the Wind on United States television on The G Channel. Henry said that, in the end, they paid only $0.55 cents for the use of the film.

== Parent company ==
In December 1985, 50 percent of Gill Industries Television was purchased by Heritage Communications Inc. from Allen T. Gilliland Jr. The deal's value was estimated at $75 million. Management of the cable system remained with Gill while Heritage, a top 20 cable television operator in the United States with over 600,000 subscribers, had the option to buy the remaining 50 percent of the Gill system in 1991.

== See also ==
- Z Channel
