= Rouge (film journal) =

- Website type: Online film journal
- Available in: English
- Owner: Rouge Inc.
- Creators: Helen Bandis; Adrian Martin; Grant McDonald
- Website: rouge.com.au
- Launched: 2003
- Current status: Inactive (since 2009)

Rouge was an occasionally-published online film journal, from 2003 to 2009, edited by Adrian Martin, Helen Bandis and Grant McDonald.

== History ==
Based in Australia, it published essays by critics from all over the world, many of them as translations. It has been cited as a favorite online-only film journal and has been described as "[maintaining] one of the highest standards of writing of any online film journal" and as "championing some of the most exciting and innovative critical writing being done anywhere in the world" in blog posts.

Over the years, it has published articles and other contributions by Gilbert Adair, Thom Andersen, Nicole Brenez, Pedro Costa, Serge Daney, Raymond Durgnat, Victor Erice, Chris Fujiwara, Jean-Pierre Gorin, José Luis Guerin, Hou Hsiao-hsien, Kent Jones, Dave Kehr, Jonas Mekas, Luc Moullet, Mark Rappaport, Jonathan Rosenbaum, Peter Tscherkassky and Apichatpong Weerasethakul.

The journal has published a book under the Rouge Press imprint. A collection of essays on Raul Ruiz was released in 2004. ISBN 0975186906 OCLC 681051200
