= Caimán Cuadernos de Cine =

Spanish language monthly film magazine

- Editor: Jara Yañez (since 2022)
- Categories: Film magazine
- Frequency: Monthly
- Publisher: Ediciones Caimán, S.L.
- Founder: Carlos F. Heredero
- Founded: 2007
- First issue: May 2007
- Country: Spain
- Language: Spanish

Caimán Cuadernos de Cine, also referred to as Caimán CdC or simply as Caimán, is a Spanish film magazine published both in print and online editions created by Carlos F. Heredero in 2007. It is edited by Caimán Ediciones.

== History ==
It was launched as the Spanish edition of Cahiers du Cinéma under the name Cahiers du cinéma. España, intending to deliver a 75% of original content and 25% of translations from the French edition. In December 2011, following a set of conditions that Phaidon (owner of Cahiers) intended to force in the magazine, compromising "the economic viability of the project, the autonomy of business management and the editorial independence of the content", Heredero announced that the January 2012 issue would be titled under the new name of Caimán Cuadernos de Cine. In December 2021, after 161 issues, Jara Yáñez was announced as the new editor-in-chief, replacing Heredero.
