= SportsChannel Los Angeles =

Defunct American regional sports network

- Country: United States
- Broadcast area: Southern California
- Network: SportsChannel
- Headquarters: Los Angeles

Programming
- Language(s): English
- Picture format: 480i (SDTV)

Ownership
- Owner: Cablevision (50%); NBC (50%)
- Sister channels: CNBC Cable Network

History
- Launched: June 30, 1989; 35 years ago
- Replaced: Z Channel
- Closed: December 31, 1992; 32 years ago
- Replaced by: Fox Sports West 2

SportsChannel Los Angeles was an American regional sports network owned as a joint venture between the Rainbow Media subsidiary of Cablevision and NBC, and operated as an affiliate of SportsChannel. Headquartered in Los Angeles, the channel broadcast regional coverage of sports events throughout the Southern California, with a focus on Los Angeles-area professional sports teams.

== History ==
SportsChannel Los Angeles launched on June 30, 1989; it served as the successor to Z Channel, an avant-garde movie service focusing on a variety of high-profile and lesser-known but critically acclaimed films. Like its predecessor, SportsChannel Los Angeles operated as a premium cable service, requiring cable subscribers to pay an extra monthly fee to receive the network, a distribution method that many regional sports networks had utilized at the time of its launch; however unlike its predecessor, it did not broadcast 24 hours a day at first, offering programming from 2:00 p.m. to 1:00 a.m. on weekdays and from 10:00 a.m. to 1:00 a.m. on weekends.

Officials with Rainbow Media thought that it would give SportsChannel Los Angeles a financial advantage compared to Prime Ticket, which had the regional cable television rights to the Los Angeles Lakers and Los Angeles Kings but, in direct contrast, operated as a basic cable service. In the spring of 1991, the network acquired the regional television rights to the Los Angeles Clippers, effective with the 1991–92 season, assuming the local rights to the NBA team's game telecasts from Prime Ticket after one year.

The tactic backfired, as SportsChannel's Los Angeles subscriber base ultimately never matched that of Prime Ticket. After it replaced Z Channel, the network had about 120,000 subscribers; that number dropped sharply to around 67,000 subscribers by 1992.

Because of this, the network attempted to reboot itself as a basic cable network on April 1, 1992; however, it chose to maintain premium exclusivity to selected events such as marquee Dodgers, Angels, Clippers and Stanley Cup Finals games, still requiring those events to be purchased on a pay-per-view basis, while all of the network's other programming including regular-season NHL games, college basketball and live and replayed horse races held at Santa Anita races were made available to all cable subscribers. However, because of the surcharge that would have to be passed to subscribers by carrying SportsChannel as a part-time premium/basic service, the plan did not sit well with some providers such as Cencom Cable Associates (which served parts of the western San Gabriel Valley, including Pasadena) and Paragon Cable (covering the suburbs of Torrance and Garden Grove), which decided to drop the network altogether.

In addition, the network's decision to operate as a pay service caused some complaints from viewers, none more so than on May 3, 1992, after it became a part-time premium channel. Because of the riots that rocked Los Angeles following the acquittal of officers involved in the brutal beating of Rodney King, an NBA Playoff game between the Los Angeles Clippers and Utah Jazz was moved to the Anaheim Convention Center and the game's telecast was removed by NBC and moved to TBS, whose telecast of the game – due to NBA broadcasting rules – had to be blacked out in the Los Angeles market. SportsChannel Los Angeles then inherited the exclusive local rights to televise the game. However, the network chose not to unscramble its signal; in letters to the Los Angeles Times and other sources, viewers complained that the game should have been made available to all subscribers as a public service.

As a result of the problems with its business structure, Cablevision/NBC announced in November 1992 that it would shut down the network. SportsChannel Los Angeles ceased operations on December 31, 1992. Prime Ticket (now Bally Sports West) subsequently acquired the broadcast rights to the Angels and Clippers; it was the acquisition of those rights as well as that of the Los Angeles Dodgers that led to the creation of Fox Sports West 2 (now the present-day Bally Sports SoCal) in January 1997.

== Programming ==
SportsChannel Los Angeles held the regional cable television rights to the Los Angeles Dodgers and California Angels Major League Baseball franchises, and the Los Angeles Clippers of the NBA. The network also carried college basketball, baseball and football games from the Big West Conference. It also showed National Hockey League games, horse races from Santa Anita Park, and through its affiliation with SportsChannel America, college football and basketball games from various other collegiate athletic conferences.
