= The Snob's Dictionary =

Book by David Kamp

The Snob's Dictionary is a series of books by Vanity Fair contributing writer David Kamp that satirizes snobbery (cinephilia (Film Snob), rock music (Rock Snob), winery (Wine Snob) and fine cuisine (Food Snob)) which soon became a video series with some episodes narrated by actor Judah Friedlander.

== Summary ==
An inside look into cultural snobs whose knowledge of the said subjects are more important than enjoying them.

== Examples ==
- Jonas Mekas: "Lithuanian-born, New York-based overlord of avant-garde film"
- Jangle: "Critic-beloved noun-adjective used to evoke sunny guitar pop"
- Harlan Estate: "Ultimate cult winery, located in Napa and founded by real-estate developer and snob manipulator Bill Harlan"
- Geoduck: "Giant saltwater clam with alarmingly phallic siphon that hangs, John Holmes-like, out of its open shell"
- Hammer Films: "British production company that, in its factory-like production of blood-soaked, décolletage-heavy horror flicks from the 50s to the 70s, was an overseas cousin to the United States AIP, only with a better roster of actors.
- Badfinger: "Ill-started power pop quartet signed to the Beatles' Apple Records under the aegis of mentor Paul McCartney, who saw them as the heirs to his rupturing group--a patently flawed premise nevertheless embraced today by Revisionist Snobs."
- Lester Bangs: "Dead rock critic canonized for his willfully obnoxious, amphetamine-streaked prose."

== See also ==
- Film criticism
- Sideways - the 2004 Oscar-winning Alexander Payne film about California wine tasters
- Rockism and poptimism
- New Hollywood
- Cult film
- Indiewood
