= Jerry Harvey (screenwriter) =

American screenwriter

- Born: Gerald Francis Harvey; October 28, 1949; Bakersfield, California, U.S.
- Died: April 9, 1988 (aged 38)
- Occupations: Screenwriter, film programmer

Gerald Francis "Jerry" Harvey (October 28, 1949 – April 9, 1988) was an American screenwriter and film programmer, best known for his work on Z Channel, a pioneering cable station in Los Angeles from 1974 to 1989.

== Background ==
Born in Bakersfield, California, Harvey moved to Los Angeles in the late 1960s and enrolled at the University of California, Los Angeles (UCLA). While at UCLA, he was enrolled in an English course taught by Charles Lynn Batten, and made a positive impression on Batten early on. In 1971, he met Douglas Venturelli, with whom he co-wrote China 9, Liberty 37. The film, a "spaghetti Western" shot in Italy and Spain, featured Sam Peckinpah in a rare acting role. Filmed in 1978, it would not see a European release until 1978 (and was not shown in America until years later, in some cities as late as 1984). It would be Harvey's only screenwriting credit.

In 1974, Harvey programmed the director's cut of Peckinpah's The Wild Bunch in front of a sellout crowd at the Beverly Canon Theater, with Peckinpah himself in attendance. The very concept of a "director's cut" had little commercial viability until Harvey demonstrated it with this screening. Later, as longer versions of films such as Touch of Evil by Orson Welles began surfacing from studio vaults, director's cuts became a staple of the revival house theater-circuit. (In the 1960s and 1970s, before the rise of home video, revival houses were the only way to see films as their makers intended.) Harvey's passion for film won him friendships with filmmakers such as Peckinpah, Robert Altman, James B. Harris, Monte Hellman as well as actors such as Peter O'Toole.

Harvey, in partnership with producer Richard Chase and theatre operator Kenneth Greenstone, created a small company, Mayfair Film Group, to release arthouse films in America. Their best-known releases were the rock'n'roll drama That'll Be the Day starring David Essex, and Ken Russell's biopic Mahler, starring Robert Powell.

== Programming career ==
Unimpressed with the usual television fare, Harvey wrote an angry letter to the Los Angeles-based pay-TV service SelecTV; they were so impressed that they hired him as an assistant film programmer. In 1981, the eclectic Z Channel, another pay-TV outlet in LA, hired Harvey as its director of programming. Harvey brought his relationships with the above-listed filmmakers and championed their work, including Michael Cimino's Heaven's Gate, The Ruling Class with Peter O'Toole, Sergio Leone's Once Upon a Time in America, Karel Reisz's The Loves of Isadora, John Ford's Up the River, Bernardo Bertolucci's 1900, and Peckinpah's The Wild Bunch and Pat Garrett & Billy the Kid.

=== Z Channel ===
Z Channel, launched in 1974 (one of the early pay-TV services in the US), soon enjoyed tremendous popularity and influence. Producer Charles Joffe told filmmaker Xan Cassavetes that the primary reason Woody Allen's Annie Hall won the Academy Award for Best Picture in 1977 was because it had played so frequently on Z Channel during the weeks the awards were being voted.

Jerry Harvey's first significant coup came in 1982 when studio executive David Chasman alerted him that the director's cut of Heaven's Gate, written and directed by Michael Cimino, was lying fallow in a British vault. Few had seen this version since its one-week run in Manhattan in November 1980. (The film had been so attacked that it was generally believed, even by studio insiders, that Cimino's original version had ceased to exist altogether.) Harvey retrieved this one remaining print and gave it a highly publicized "world premiere" on December 24, 1982. The success of this airing was consequential. Cimino's version was shortly released on home video, where it is now the only version available.

Although Harvey saw to it that Z (as it was known by its subscribers and devotees) kept commercial pace with its rivals HBO, Showtime and The Movie Channel by showing the latest box-office hits, Z's primary appeal to viewers lay in its devotion to films that were personal passions.

Z Channel: A Magnificent Obsession, a 2004 documentary directed by Xan Cassavetes, detailed Harvey's life and accomplishments. Altman and Harris attested to Harvey's sympathy and inspiration as a champion of film. Filmmakers such as Quentin Tarantino, and Jim Jarmusch acknowledged the influence of the Z on their works.

== Death ==
Harvey married in February 1986 to Deri Rudulph (born December 21, 1949). They remained together until April 9, 1988, when Harvey killed Rudulph with a pistol before turning the gun on himself.
