= Z Channel =

Defunct U.S. premium cable TV channel

- Country: United States
- Broadcast area: Southern California
- Headquarters: Los Angeles, California

Programming
- Language: English

Ownership
- Owner: Theta Cable (1974–1981); Group W (1981–1987); Rock Associates (1987–1988); American Spectacor (1988–1989); Cablevision/NBC (1989)

History
- Launched: May 1, 1974 (52 years ago)
- Closed: June 29, 1989 (37 years ago)
- Replaced by: SportsChannel Los Angeles

The Z Channel was one of the early pay television stations in the United States (1974–1989) best known for its devotion to the art of cinema due to the eclectic choice of films by the programming chief Jerry Harvey.

== History ==
Z Channel was launched in 1974 by Theta Cable (a division of TelePrompTer Corporation and Hughes Aircraft Co.) which was acquired by Group W (Westinghouse) in 1981. Operations were located in Santa Monica, California. Jerry Harvey was hired as program director in 1980. As program director, Harvey was given permission to program the network the way he saw fit. As such, the network featured a wide variety of films not typically shown on other pay television services at the time.

These included many B movies, silent films, foreign films, and original unedited versions of films. On Christmas Eve 1982, Harvey made the decision to show the original (previously unreleased in two years) version of Heaven's Gate, a movie that had been considered a disaster by all accounts. His decision was a success as the movie became the most watched feature ever shown on Z Channel. Other networks soon followed and aired Heaven's Gate.

By the mid-1980s, Z Channel had 90,000 subscribers. In 1987, Group W sold Z Channel to Seattle-based Rock Associates for $5 million. Both increased competition and lack of interest by Group W leading up to the sale led to a decrease in subscribers. In January 1988, Rock Associates merged with American Spectacor.

== Demise ==
In April 1988, there were two major changes to the network: the death of Jerry Harvey in a murder-suicide and the addition of sports to regular programming. (It had broadcast a UCLA–USC basketball game around 1978.) Deals were made to show games from the Los Angeles Angels, Clippers and Dodgers. This increased the numbers of subscribers to 110,000. The sports deals were funded by selling advertising during the games. However, a lawsuit ensued with a court ruling that contracts with the movie studios stipulated that the service be commercial-free.

Out of options, the channel was sold to Cablevision and NBC on March 16, 1989, who were partners in the joint-venture SportsChannel and set to launch Consumer News and Business Channel (now CNBC). On June 29, 1989, Z Channel faded to black and was replaced by SportsChannel Los Angeles. The last film shown on Z Channel was John Ford's My Darling Clementine.

== Legacy ==
Z Channel popularized the use of letterboxing on television, as well as showing "director's cut" versions of films (which is a term popularized after Z Channel's showing of Heaven's Gate). Z Channel's devotion to cinema and choice of rare and important films had an influence on such directors as Robert Altman, Quentin Tarantino, Alexander Payne and Jim Jarmusch.

The channel was the subject of the 2004 documentary Z Channel: A Magnificent Obsession, which was directed by Xan Cassavetes, daughter of John Cassavetes.

== Selected films that aired on Z Channel ==
- 1900
- Bring Me the Head of Alfredo Garcia
- City Lights
- Heaven's Gate
- I Vitelloni
- Ikiru
- Johnny Guitar
- The Leopard
- Los Olvidados
- The Man Who Fell to Earth
- Midnight Cowboy
- My Darling Clementine
- Once Upon A Time in America
- The Onion Field
- Overlord
- Rear Window
- Ride the High Country
- The Song Remains the Same
- The Spider's Stratagem
- The Story of Adele H
- Straw Dogs
- That Most Important Thing: Love
- Throne of Blood
- The Wild Bunch

== See also ==
- The Criterion Collection, similar in content
- Home Box Office, one of Z's competitors
- Showtime, one of the competitors
- The G Channel
