= 1989 Oakland Athletics season =

Major League Baseball season

1989 Oakland Athletics
- World Series champions American League champions American League West champions
- League: American League
- Division: West
- Ballpark: Oakland–Alameda County Coliseum
- City: Oakland, California
- Record: 99–63 (.611)
- Divisional place: 1st
- Owners: Walter A. Haas, Jr.
- General managers: Sandy Alderson
- Managers: Tony La Russa
- Television: KPIX/KICU-TV (Monte Moore, Ray Fosse)
- Radio: KSFO (Bill King, Lon Simmons, Ray Fosse); KNTA (Amaury Pi-Gonzalez, Evilio Mendoza)

The 1989 Oakland Athletics season was the 89th season for the Oakland Athletics franchise, all as members of the American League, and their 22nd season in Oakland. The Athletics finished the season in first place in the American League West, with a record of 99 wins and 63 losses, seven games in front of the Kansas City Royals. Oakland dominated the American League, earning their second consecutive AL West title, as well as marking the second straight year in which they finished with the best record in all of baseball. A's pitcher Dave Stewart recorded his third straight season of earning 20 or more wins while Rickey Henderson put on a dazzling offensive performance in the postseason as he approached the prospects of landing a three million dollar contract for the following season. The team defeated the Toronto Blue Jays in five games in the ALCS, then swept their cross-Bay rivals, the San Francisco Giants, in an earthquake-marred World Series. The Athletics looked to be a future dynasty by the close of the 1989 season.

== Offseason ==
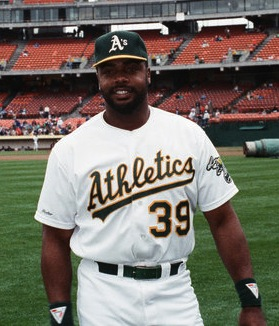
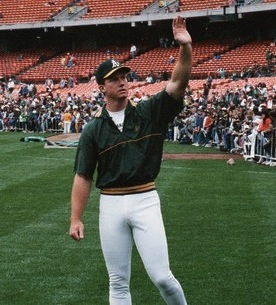
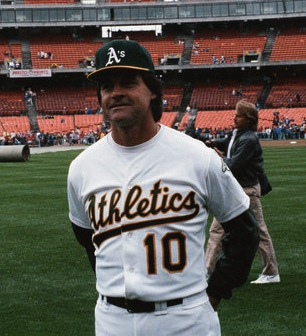
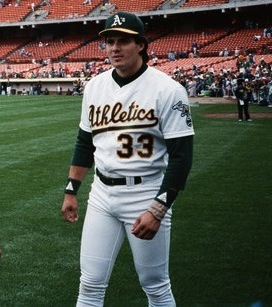
Major figures in the 1989 A's season included (clockwise from top left) Dave Parker, Mark McGwire, Jose Canseco, and manager Tony La Russa.
- November 28, 1988: Mike Moore signs as a free agent with the Oakland Athletics.
- November 30, 1988: Billy Beane was signed as a free agent with the Oakland Athletics.

== Regular season ==
- Ken Griffey Jr. made his major league baseball debut on April 3, 1989, in a game against the Oakland Athletics.
- On August 22, 1989, Nolan Ryan struck out Rickey Henderson for the 5,000th strikeout in his career.

=== Season standings ===
AL West
Team	W	L	Pct.	GB	Home	Road
Oakland Athletics	99	63	.611	—	54‍–‍27	45‍–‍36
Kansas City Royals	92	70	.568	7	55‍–‍26	37‍–‍44
California Angels	91	71	.562	8	52‍–‍29	39‍–‍42
Texas Rangers	83	79	.512	16	45‍–‍36	38‍–‍43
Minnesota Twins	80	82	.494	19	45‍–‍36	35‍–‍46
Seattle Mariners	73	89	.451	26	40‍–‍41	33‍–‍48
Chicago White Sox	69	92	.429	29½	35‍–‍45	34‍–‍47

=== Record vs. opponents ===
1989 American League record Sources:
Team	BAL	BOS	CAL	CWS	CLE	DET	KC	MIL	MIN	NYY	OAK	SEA	TEX	TOR
Baltimore	—	6–7	6–6	6–6	7–6	10–3	6–6	7–6	4–8	8–5	5–7	6–6	9–3	7–6
Boston	7–6	—	4–8	7–5	8–5	11–2	4–8	6–7	6–6	7–6	7–5	5–7	6–6	5–8
California	6–6	8–4	—	8–5	5–7	11–1	4–9	7–5	11–2	6–6	5–8	7–6	6–7	7–5
Chicago	6–6	5–7	5–8	—	7–5	4–8	6–7	10–2	5–8	5–6	5–8	7–6	3–10	1–11
Cleveland	6–7	5–8	7–5	5–7	—	5–8	8–4	3–10	5–7	9–4	2–10	6–6	7–5	5–8
Detroit	3–10	2–11	1–11	8–4	8–5	—	6–6	6–7	5–7	6–7	4–8	4–8	4–8	2–11
Kansas City	6–6	8–4	9–4	7–6	4–8	6–6	—	8–4	7–6	6–6	7–6	9–4	8–5	7–5
Milwaukee	6–7	7–6	5–7	2–10	10–3	7–6	4–8	—	9–3	8–5	5–7	7–5	5–7	6–7
Minnesota	8–4	6–6	2–11	8–5	7–5	7–5	6–7	3–9	—	6–6	6–7	7–6	5–8	9–3
New York	5–8	6–7	6–6	6–5	4–9	7–6	6–6	5–8	6–6	—	3–9	8–4	5–7	7–6
Oakland	7–5	5–7	8–5	8–5	10–2	8–4	6–7	7–5	7–6	9–3	—	9–4	8–5	7–5
Seattle	6–6	7–5	6–7	6–7	6–6	8–4	4–9	5–7	6–7	4–8	4–9	—	6–7	5–7
Texas	3–9	6–6	7–6	10–3	5–7	8–4	5–8	7–5	8–5	7–5	5–8	7–6	—	5–7
Toronto	6–7	8–5	5–7	11–1	8–5	11–2	5–7	7–6	3–9	6–7	5–7	7–5	7–5	—

=== Notable transactions ===
- April 6, 1989: Troy Afenir was traded by the Houston Astros to the Oakland Athletics for Matt Sinatro.
- April 6, 1989: Mike Norris was signed as a free agent with the Oakland Athletics.
- May 27, 1989: Jamie Quirk was signed as a free agent with the Oakland Athletics.
- June 5, 1989: Mike Mohler was drafted by the Oakland Athletics in the 42nd round of the 1989 amateur draft. Player signed August 18, 1989.
- June 21, 1989: Rickey Henderson was traded by the New York Yankees to the Oakland Athletics for Greg Cadaret, Eric Plunk, and Luis Polonia.
- July 24, 1989: Jamie Quirk was released by the Oakland Athletics.
- July 31, 1989: Glenn Hubbard was released by the Oakland Athletics.
- August 30, 1989: Ken Phelps was traded by the New York Yankees to the Oakland Athletics for Scott Holcomb (minors).

=== Roster ===
1989 Oakland Athletics
Roster
Pitchers: 54 Todd Burns; 32 Greg Cadaret; 41 Jim Corsi; 14 Storm Davis; 46 Bill Dawley; 43 Dennis Eckersley; 40 Rick Honeycutt; 21 Mike Moore; 19 Gene Nelson; 38 Dave Otto; 51 Eric Plunk; 53 Brian Snyder; 34 Dave Stewart; 35 Bob Welch; 29 Curt Young; 20 Matt Young	Catchers: 23 Chris Bando; 24,27 Ron Hassey; 36 Terry Steinbach; Infielders: 30 Larry Arndt; 9 Mike Gallego; 51 Dann Howitt; 17 Glenn Hubbard; 4 Carney Lansford; 25 Mark McGwire; 44 Ken Phelps; 2 Tony Phillips; 3 Jamie Quirk; 3 Dick Scott; 7 Walt Weiss	Outfielders: 11,27 Billy Beane; 00,12 Lance Blankenship; 33 José Canseco; 42 Dave Henderson; 22,24 Rickey Henderson; 28 Stan Javier; 22 Doug Jennings; 6 Félix José; 39 Dave Parker; 22 Luis Polonia; Other batters: 31 Scott Hemond	Manager: 10 Tony La Russa; Coaches: 18 Dave Duncan (pitching); 5 Art Kusnyer (bullpen); 15 Rene Lachemann (third base); 8 Dave McKay (first base); 45 Merv Rettenmund (hitting); 46 Tommie Reynolds (bench)

=== Game log ===
1989 game log
April

#	Date	Opponent	Score	Win	Loss	Save	Attendance	Record
1	April 3	Mariners	3–2	Stewart (1–0)	Langston (0–1)	Eckersley (1)	46,163	1–0
2	April 5	Mariners	11–1	Welch (1–0)	Bankhead (0–1)		16,045	2–0
3	April 6	Mariners	11–3	Davis (1–0)	Campbell (0–1)	Burns (1)	19,087	3–0
4	April 7	White Sox	7–1	Long (1–0)	C. Young (0–1)	Jones (1)	20,585	3–1
5	April 8	White Sox	7–4	Pérez (1–0)	Moore (0–1)	Thigpen (1)	32,881	3–2
6	April 9	White Sox	4–2	Stewart (2–0)	Reuss (1–1)	Eckersley (2)	45,110	4–2
7	April 10	@ Angels	4–0	Welch (2–0)	Finley (1–1)		23,820	5–2
8	April 11	@ Angels	7–1	Blyleven (1–0)	Davis (1–1)		23,322	5–3
9	April 12	@ Angels	5–0	McCaskill (2–0)	C. Young (0–2)		24,650	5–4
10	April 13	@ Angels	5–0	Moore (1–1)	Abbott (0–2)		24,137	6–4
11	April 14	@ White Sox	7–4	Stewart (3–0)	Pérez (1–1)		37,950	7–4
12	April 15	@ White Sox	7–4	Reuss (2–1)	Welch (2–1)	Thigpen (3)	15,748	7–5
13	April 16	@ White Sox	3–2	Eckersley (1–0)	King (0–3)		20,969	8–5
14	April 17	@ Mariners	7–2	Hanson (2–1)	C. Young (0–3)		14,827	8–6
15	April 18	@ Mariners	5–3	Plunk (1–0)	Reed (1–2)	Eckersley (3)	9,670	9–6
16	April 19	@ Mariners	7–5	Stewart (4–0)	Langston (2–2)	Eckersley (4)	11,328	10–6
17	April 21	Angels	10–6	Welch (3–1)	Finley (2–2)	Honeycutt (1)	26,903	11–6
18	April 22	Angels	4–3	C. Young (1–3)	Blyleven (2–1)	Eckersley (5)	33,172	12–6
19	April 23	Angels	2–0	Moore (2–1)	McCaskill (3–1)	Eckersley (6)	25,681	13–6
20	April 24	Blue Jays	5–4	Nelson (1–0)	Henke (1–2)		25,099	14–6
21	April 25	Blue Jays	3–1	Davis (2–1)	Cerutti (0–1)	Eckersley (7)	12,437	15–6
22	April 26	Orioles	2–1	Bautista (2–2)	Welch (3–2)	Olson (2)	17,060	15–7
23	April 27	Orioles	9–4	Burns (1–0)	Thurmond (0–1)		21,423	16–7
24	April 28	Tigers	2–1	Moore (3–1)	Gibson (1–1)	Eckersley (8)	26,594	17–7
25	April 29	Tigers	3–2	Stewart (5–0)	Alexander (3–1)		36,313	18–7
26	April 30	Tigers	7–2	Tanana (2–3)	Davis (2–2)	Hernández (5)	36,009	18–8

May

#	Date	Opponent	Score	Win	Loss	Save	Attendance	Record
27	May 2	@ Blue Jays	8–5	Honeycutt (1–0)	Ward (1–4)	Plunk (1)	23,439	19–8
28	May 3	@ Blue Jays	2–0	Flanagan (2–1)	Moore (3–2)		22,370	19–9
29	May 5	@ Tigers	5–3	Stewart (6–0)	Tanana (2–4)	Eckersley (9)	18,482	20–9
30	May 6	@ Tigers	6–3	Morris (1–6)	Davis (2–3)	Hernández (6)	32,404	20–10
31	May 7	@ Tigers	5–4	Welch (4–2)	Hudson (0–3)	Eckersley (10)	20,391	21–10
32	May 8	@ Orioles	6–1	Moore (4–2)	Milacki (1–3)		19,159	22–10
33	May 11	@ Orioles	6–2	Ballard (6–1)	Stewart (6–1)		1,201	22–11
34	May 12	Brewers	5–4	Burns (2–0)	Plesac (1–2)		30,743	23–11
35	May 13	Brewers	4–3	Welch (5–2)	Bosio (5–2)	Eckersley (11)	33,053	24–11
36	May 14	Brewers	2–1	Crim (2–2)	Moore (4–3)	Plesac (6)	26,989	24–12
37	May 15	Brewers	12–2	Stewart (7–1)	August (2–5)		25,974	25–12
38	May 16	Yankees	3–2	Parker (1–0)	C. Young (1–4)	Righetti (6)	25,852	25–13
39	May 17	Yankees	8–3	Davis (3–3)	Dotson (1–1)	Eckersley (12)	24,505	26–13
40	May 18	Yankees	6–2	Welch (6–2)	John (2–7)	Burns (2)	40,758	27–13
41	May 19	Red Sox	7 – 4 (10)	Stanley (2–1)	Nelson (1–1)		40,382	27–14
42	May 20	Red Sox	6–3	Stewart (8–1)	Gardner (1–4)	Eckersley (13)	43,427	28–14
43	May 21	Red Sox	5–4	Burns (3–0)	Clemens (5–3)	Eckersley (14)	44,505	29–14
44	May 23	@ Brewers	9–1	Bosio (6–3)	Welch (6–3)		13,882	29–15
45	May 24	@ Brewers	6–2	Moore (5–3)	Birkbeck (0–3)		13,932	30–15
46	May 25	@ Brewers	4–1	Clutterbuck (2–1)	Stewart (8–2)	Plesac (9)	18,898	30–16
47	May 26	@ Yankees	4–0	Burns (4–0)	Hawkins (4–6)		28,726	31–16
48	May 27	@ Yankees	3–0	C. Young (2–4)	LaPoint (5–3)	Honeycutt (2)	28,111	32–16
49	May 28	@ Yankees	4–3	Moore (6–3)	Parker (2–1)	Honeycutt (3)	38,527	33–16
50	May 29	@ Red Sox	3 – 2 (10)	Smith (3–1)	Welch (6–4)		33,344	33–17
51	May 30	@ Red Sox	4–2	Stewart (9–2)	Smithson (2–4)	Honeycutt (4)	31,407	34–17
52	May 31	@ Red Sox	4 – 3 (10)	Smith (4–1)	Plunk (1–1)		33,510	34–18

June

#	Date	Opponent	Score	Win	Loss	Save	Attendance	Record
53	June 2	Indians	5–3	Swindell (6–1)	Moore (6–4)	Jones (12)	28,052	34–19
54	June 3	Indians	7–0	Welch (7–4)	Candiotti (6–3)		35,466	35–19
55	June 4	Indians	4–0	Stewart (10–2)	Farrell (3–6)		34,610	36–19
56	June 5	Twins	2–1	Oliveras (3–2)	C. Young (2–5)	Reardon (9)	34,320	36–20
57	June 6	Twins	1–0	Moore (7–4)	Anderson (6–4)		23,505	37–20
58	June 7	Twins	3–2	Welch (8–4)	Viola (4–8)	Burns (3)	27,396	38–20
59	June 9	@ Rangers	11–8	Guante (4–3)	Nelson (1–2)	Russell (14)	35,799	38–21
60	June 10	@ Rangers	5–1	Davis (4–3)	Witt (5–6)		40,796	39–21
61	June 11	@ Rangers	5–1	Moore (8–4)	Brown (5–3)	Nelson (1)	32,127	40–21
62	June 12	@ Royals	2 – 1 (11)	Gordon (8–2)	Burns (4–1)		39,387	40–22
63	June 13	@ Royals	5–3	Appier (1–1)	C. Young (2–6)	Farr (14)	29,816	40–23
64	June 14	@ Royals	2–1	Stewart (11–2)	Leibrandt (4–7)	Honeycutt (5)	31,087	41–23
65	June 16	@ Orioles	7–5	Davis (5–3)	Holton (2–5)	Honeycutt (6)		42–23
66	June 16	@ Orioles	5–1	Tibbs (3–0)	Moore (8–5)		40,707	42–24
67	June 17	@ Orioles	4–2	Bautista (3–4)	M. Young (0–1)	Olson (8)	36,431	42–25
68	June 18	@ Orioles	4–2	Schmidt (7–5)	C. Young (2–7)	Weston (1)	46,541	42–26
69	June 19	Tigers	6–4	Tanana (7–6)	Stewart (11–3)	Henneman (1)	38,607	43–26
70	June 20	Tigers	6–4	Nelson (2–2)	Havens (0–1)	Burns (4)	30,184	44–26
71	June 21	Tigers	6–3	Moore (9–5)	Schwabe (1–3)	Honeycutt (7)	28,654	45–26
72	June 22	Blue Jays	4 – 2 (13)	Hernandez (1–0)	Corsi (0–1)	Wells (2)	21,418	45–27
73	June 23	Blue Jays	10–8	Buice (1–0)	C. Young (2–8)	Henke (3)	27,795	45–28
74	June 24	Blue Jays	7–1	Stewart (12–3)	Stieb (7–4)		39,659	46–28
75	June 25	Blue Jays	6–3	Davis (6–3)	Key (7–7)	Honeycutt (8)	49,219	47–28
76	June 26	@ Twins	4 – 3 (10)	Reardon (2–2)	Burns (4–2)		31,914	47–29
77	June 27	@ Twins	11–5	Wayne (3–0)	Nelson (2–3)	Berenguer (2)	37,891	47–30
78	June 28	@ Twins	2–0	Viola (6–8)	Stewart (12–4)		41,387	47–31
79	June 30	@ Indians	5–0	Welch (9–4)	Swindell (10–2)	Honeycutt (9)	27,435	48–31

July

#	Date	Opponent	Score	Win	Loss	Save	Attendance	Record
80	July 1	@ Indians	6–4	Moore (10–5)	Yett (4–6)	Burns (5)	18,826	49–31
81	July 2	@ Indians	11–3	Davis (7–3)	Farrell (4–9)		22,549	50–31
82	July 3	Royals	1–0	Stewart (13–4)	Gubicza (8–6)	Honeycutt (10)	36,763	51–31
83	July 4	Royals	10–1	Saberhagen (8–4)	M. Young (0–2)		46,031	51–32
84	July 5	Royals	12 – 9 (11)	Crawford (1–0)	Honeycutt (1–1)		20,791	51–33
85	July 6	Royals	3–1	Moore (11–5)	Aquino (3–4)	Burns (6)	21,985	52–33
86	July 7	Rangers	6–3	Witt (7–8)	Davis (7–4)	Russell (20)	39,678	52–34
87	July 8	Rangers	5 – 4 (10)	Russell (4–2)	M. Young (0–3)		38,220	52–35
88	July 9	Rangers	7–1	Welch (10–4)	Hough (5–10)	Honeycutt (11)	40,060	53–35
89	July 13	@ Blue Jays	11–7	Burns (5–2)	Key (7–9)		48,207	54–35
90	July 14	@ Blue Jays	4–1	Stieb (9–5)	Welch (10–5)	Ward (9)	48,325	54–36
91	July 15	@ Blue Jays	6–1	Flanagan (5–6)	Stewart (13–5)		48,238	54–37
92	July 16	@ Blue Jays	6–2	Moore (12–5)	Cerutti (5–5)	Burns (7)	48,405	55–37
93	July 17	@ Tigers	2–1	Henneman (6–2)	Nelson (2–4)		21,844	55–38
94	July 18	@ Tigers	7–2	Davis (8–4)	Beard (0–1)		21,792	56–38
95	July 20	Orioles	5–2	Stewart (14–5)	Schmidt (8–9)	Eckersley (15)	30,697	57–38
96	July 21	Orioles	3–2	Moore (13–5)	Olson (3–1)		30,848	58–38
97	July 22	Orioles	3–1	Welch (11–5)	Harnisch (1–3)	Eckersley (16)	37,241	59–38
98	July 23	Orioles	3–2	Davis (9–4)	Ballard (11–5)	Eckersley (17)	43,570	60–38
99	July 24	Angels	5–4	Fraser (3–5)	Nelson (2–5)	Harvey (13)	44,548	60–39
100	July 25	Angels	4–0	Finley (12–6)	Stewart (14–6)	Minton (6)	43,529	60–40
101	July 26	Angels	9–5	M. Young (1–3)	Witt (7–8)		44,588	61–40
102	July 28	Mariners	8 – 7 (11)	Burns (6–2)	Harris (1–4)		36,446	61–41
103	July 29	Mariners	14–6	Johnson (5–2)	Davis (9–5)	Swift (1)	40,734	61–42
104	July 30	Mariners	5–3	Stewart (15–6)	Holman (4–3)	Eckersley (18)	43,898	62–42
105	July 31	White Sox	3–2	Moore (14–5)	Thigpen (1–4)		34,554	63–42

August

#	Date	Opponent	Score	Win	Loss	Save	Attendance	Record
106	August 1	White Sox	2–0	C. Young (3–8)	Hibbard (2–3)	Eckersley (19)	22,536	64–42
107	August 2	White Sox	2–0	Davis (10–5)	Pérez (7–12)	Honeycutt (12)	25,146	65–42
108	August 3	White Sox	6–4	Pall (4–2)	Welch (11–6)	Thigpen (23)	31,974	65–43
109	August 4	@ Mariners	5–3	Stewart (16–6)	Holman (4–4)	Eckersley (20)	23,621	66–43
110	August 5	@ Mariners	11–5	Bankhead (11–4)	Moore (14–6)	Jackson (5)	36,961	66–44
111	August 6	@ Mariners	2–1	Davis (11–5)	Dunne (2–6)	Eckersley (21)	19,303	67–44
112	August 7	@ Mariners	5–3	Zavaras (1–2)	Welch (11–7)		31,334	67–45
113	August 8	@ White Sox	3 – 2 (10)	Honeycutt (2–1)	Pall (4–3)	Eckersley (22)	17,832	68–45
114	August 9	@ White Sox	3 – 2 (11)	McCarthy (1–1)	Corsi (0–2)		15,389	68–46
115	August 10	@ White Sox	4–1	Davis (12–5)	Rosenberg (3–8)	Eckersley (23)	16,173	69–46
116	August 11	@ Angels	5–0	Moore (15–6)	Witt (7–10)		61,696	70–46
117	August 12	@ Angels	8–3	Welch (12–7)	Abbott (10–8)	Burns (8)	53,036	71–46
118	August 13	@ Angels	4–3	Blyleven (12–2)	Stewart (16–7)	Harvey (17)	60,326	71–47
119	August 15	Indians	5–2	Davis (13–5)	Nichols (3–2)	Eckersley (24)	28,459	72–47
120	August 16	Indians	6–3	Olin (1–0)	Honeycutt (2–2)	Jones (28)	29,502	72–48
121	August 17	Indians	1–0	Welch (13–7)	Farrell (7–12)	Eckersley (25)	35,071	73–48
122	August 18	Twins	4–3	Smith (9–4)	Stewart (16–8)	Reardon (23)	38,956	73–49
123	August 19	Twins	5 – 4 (10)	Davis (14–5)	Wayne (3–4)		44,123	74–49
124	August 20	Twins	5–0	Moore (16–6)	Anderson (14–10)		43,875	75–49
125	August 21	@ Tigers	6–1	C. Young (4–8)	Tanana (9–11)		6,197	76–49
126	August 22	@ Rangers	2–0	Welch (14–7)	Ryan (14–8)	Eckersley (26)	42,869	77–49
127	August 23	@ Rangers	5–4	Stewart (17–8)	Brown (11–8)	Eckersley (27)	23,453	78–49
128	August 24	@ Rangers	6–2	Jeffcoat (7–5)	Davis (14–6)	Mielke (1)	25,604	78–50
129	August 25	@ Royals	3–1	Gubicza (12–10)	Moore (16–7)	Montgomery (14)	38,263	78–51
130	August 26	@ Royals	2–0	Saberhagen (16–5)	C. Young (4–9)		41,253	78–52
131	August 27	@ Royals	6–0	Welch (15–7)	Gordon (16–5)		38,263	79–52
132	August 28	@ Yankees	7–3	Stewart (18–8)	Hawkins (13–13)	Eckersley (28)	25,359	80–52
133	August 29	@ Yankees	19–5	Davis (15–6)	Cary (3–3)		27,751	81–52
134	August 30	@ Yankees	8–5	Plunk (5–4)	Moore (16–8)	McCullers (2)	26,238	81–53

September

#	Date	Opponent	Score	Win	Loss	Save	Attendance	Record
135	September 1	@ Brewers	6 – 5 (10)	Crim (9–5)	Burns (6–3)		17,465	81–54
136	September 2	@ Brewers	7–2	Stewart (19–8)	Filer (5–3)		36,980	82–54
137	September 3	@ Brewers	5–0	Davis (16–6)	Navarro (4–7)	Nelson (2)	30,583	83–54
138	September 4	Red Sox	8–5	Dopson (10–6)	Moore (16–9)	Smith (21)	32,697	83–55
139	September 5	Red Sox	13–1	C. Young (5–9)	Clemens (14–10)		28,541	84–55
140	September 6	Red Sox	7–5	Welch (16–7)	Smithson (7–14)	Eckersley (29)	25,037	85–55
141	September 8	Yankees	5–1	Mohorcic (2–1)	Stewart (19–9)		43,626	85–56
142	September 9	Yankees	7–0	Moore (17–9)	Parker (4–5)		43,760	86–56
143	September 10	Yankees	6–2	Davis (17–6)	Plunk (6–5)		44,071	87–56
144	September 12	Brewers	7–6	August (10–11)	M. Young (1–4)	Plesac (30)	23,862	87–57
145	September 13	Brewers	7–6	Eckersley (2–0)	Crim (9–6)		21,246	88–57
146	September 15	@ Red Sox	7–2	Clemens (15–10)	Moore (17–10)		33,533	88–58
147	September 16	@ Red Sox	5–2	Dopson (11–7)	Davis (17–7)	Lamp (1)	33,778	88–59
148	September 17	@ Red Sox	7–6	Harris (2–1)	Welch (16–8)	Smith (22)	33,148	88–60
149	September 18	@ Indians	4 – 2 (10)	Eckersley (3–0)	Olin (1–3)		5,931	89–60
150	September 19	@ Indians	5–1	Moore (18–10)	Nichols (4–5)		6,085	90–60
151	September 20	@ Indians	8–6	Davis (18–7)	Swindell (13–6)	Eckersley (30)	6,186	91–60
152	September 21	@ Twins	2–1	Welch (17–8)	Aguilera (2–5)	Eckersley (31)	16,779	92–60
153	September 22	@ Twins	5–2	Stewart (20–9)	Dyer (3–7)	Nelson (3)	34,830	93–60
154	September 23	@ Twins	5–3	Anderson (17–10)	Moore (18–11)	Smith (1)	38,791	93–61
155	September 24	@ Twins	9–3	Davis (19–7)	Tapani (2–2)	Eckersley (32)	22,565	94–61
156	September 25	Rangers	3–2	Hall (2–1)	Burns (6–4)	Russell (38)	32,701	94–62
157	September 26	Rangers	4–3	Eckersley (4–0)	Jeffcoat (9–6)		23,119	95–62
158	September 27	Rangers	5–0	Moore (19–11)	Moyer (4–9)		32,280	96–62
159	September 28	Rangers	5–3	Stewart (21–9)	Arnsberg (2–1)	Eckersley (33)	21,127	97–62
160	September 29	Royals	4–3	Nelson (3–5)	Luecken (2–1)		43,470	98–62
161	September 30	Royals	6–1	Saberhagen (23–6)	Burns (6–5)		42,891	98–63

October

#	Date	Opponent	Score	Win	Loss	Save	Attendance	Record
162	October 1	Royals	4 – 3 (11)	Corsi (1–2)	Leach (5–6)		43,755	99–63

== Player stats ==
= Indicates team leader

=== Batting ===
==== Starters by position ====
Note: Pos = Position; G = Games played; AB = At bats; H = Hits; Avg. = Batting average; HR = Home runs; RBI = Runs batted in

Pos.	Player	G	AB	H	Avg.	HR	RBI
C	Terry Steinbach	130	454	124	.273	7	42
1B	Mark McGwire	143	490	113	.231	33	95
2B	Tony Phillips	143	451	118	.262	4	47
3B	Carney Lansford	148	551	185	.336	2	52
SS	Mike Gallego	133	357	90	.252	3	30
LF	Rickey Henderson	85	306	90	.294	9	35
CF	Dave Henderson	152	579	145	.250	15	80
RF	Stan Javier	112	310	77	.248	1	28
DH	Dave Parker	144	553	146	.264	22	97

==== Other batters ====
Note: G = Games played; AB = At bats; H = Hits; Avg. = Batting average; HR = Home runs; RBI = Runs batted in

Player	G	AB	H	Avg.	HR	RBI
Ron Hassey	97	268	61	.228	5	23
Walt Weiss	84	236	55	.233	3	21
José Canseco	65	227	61	.269	17	57
Luis Polonia	59	206	59	.286	1	17
Glenn Hubbard	53	131	26	.198	3	12
Lance Blankenship	58	125	29	.232	1	4
Billy Beane	37	79	19	.241	0	11
Félix José	20	57	11	.193	0	5
Jamie Quirk	9	10	2	.200	1	1
Ken Phelps	11	9	1	.111	0	0
Larry Arndt	2	6	1	.167	0	0
Doug Jennings	4	4	0	.000	0	0
Dann Howitt	3	3	0	.000	0	0
Dick Scott	3	2	0	.000	0	1
Chris Bando	1	2	1	.500	0	1
Scott Hemond	4	0	0	----	0	0

=== Pitching ===
==== Starting pitchers ====
Note: G = Games pitched; IP = Innings pitched; W = Wins; L = Losses; ERA = Earned run average; SO = Strikeouts

Player	G	IP	W	L	ERA	SO
Dave Stewart	36	257 2/3	21	9	3.32	155
Mike Moore	35	241 2/3	19	11	2.61	172
Bob Welch	33	209 2/3	17	8	3.00	137
Storm Davis	31	169 1/3	19	7	4.36	91
Curt Young	25	111	5	9	3.73	55
Dave Otto	1	6 2/3	0	0	2.70	4

==== Other pitchers ====
Note: G = Games pitched; IP = Innings pitched; W = Wins; L = Losses; ERA = Earned run average; SO = Strikeouts

Player	G	IP	W	L	ERA	SO
Matt Young	26	37 1/3	1	4	6.75	27

==== Relief pitchers ====
Note: G = Games pitched; W = Wins; L = Losses; SV = Saves; ERA = Earned run average; SO = Strikeouts

Player	G	W	L	SV	ERA	SO
Dennis Eckersley	51	4	0	33	1.56	55
Rick Honeycutt	64	2	2	12	2.35	52
Todd Burns	50	6	5	8	2.24	49
Gene Nelson	50	3	5	3	3.26	70
Greg Cadaret	26	0	0	0	2.28	14
Eric Plunk	23	1	1	1	2.20	24
Jim Corsi	22	1	2	0	1.88	21
Bill Dawley	4	0	0	0	4.00	3
Brian Snyder	2	0	0	0	27.00	1

== ALCS ==
=== Game 1 ===
October 3, 1989, at Oakland–Alameda County Coliseum

Team	1	2	3	4	5	6	7	8	9	R	H	E
Toronto	0	2	0	1	0	0	0	0	0	3	5	1
Oakland	0	1	0	0	1	3	0	2	X	7	11	0
W: Dave Stewart (1-0) L: Dave Stieb (0-1)
HR: TOR – Ernie Whitt (1) OAK – Dave Henderson (1), Mark McGwire (1)

=== Game 2 ===
October 4, 1989, at Oakland–Alameda County Coliseum

Team	1	2	3	4	5	6	7	8	9	R	H	E
Toronto	0	0	1	0	0	0	0	2	0	3	5	1
Oakland	0	0	0	2	0	3	1	0	X	6	9	1
W: Mike Moore (1-0) L: Todd Stottlemyre (0-1) S: Dennis Eckersley (1)
HR: OAK – Dave Parker (1)

=== Game 3 ===
October 6, 1989, at SkyDome

Team	1	2	3	4	5	6	7	8	9	R	H	E
Oakland	1	0	1	1	0	0	0	0	0	3	8	1
Toronto	0	0	0	4	0	0	3	0	X	7	8	0
W: Jimmy Key (1-0) L: Storm Davis (0-1)
HR: OAK – Dave Parker (2)

=== Game 4 ===
October 7, 1989, at SkyDome

Team	1	2	3	4	5	6	7	8	9	R	H	E
Oakland	0	0	3	0	2	0	1	0	0	6	11	1
Toronto	0	0	0	1	0	1	1	2	0	5	13	0
W: Bob Welch (1-0) L: Mike Flanagan (0-1) S: Dennis Eckersley (2)
HR: OAK – Rickey Henderson 2 (2), José Canseco (1)

=== Game 5 ===
October 8, 1989, at SkyDome

Team	1	2	3	4	5	6	7	8	9	R	H	E
Oakland	1	0	1	0	0	0	2	0	0	4	4	0
Toronto	0	0	0	0	0	0	0	1	2	3	9	0
W: Dave Stewart (2-0) L: Dave Stieb (0-2) S: Dennis Eckersley (3)
HR: TOR – Lloyd Moseby (1), George Bell (1)

== World Series ==
AL Oakland Athletics (4) vs. NL San Francisco Giants (0)

Game	Score	Date	Location	Attendance	Time of game
1	Giants – 0, A's – 5	October 14	Oakland–Alameda County Coliseum (Oakland)	49,385	2:45
2	Giants – 1, A's – 5	October 15	Oakland–Alameda County Coliseum (Oakland)	49,388	2:47
3	A's – 13, Giants – 7	October 27	Candlestick Park (San Francisco)	62,038	3:03
4	A's – 9, Giants – 6	October 28	Candlestick Park (San Francisco)	62,032	3:07

== Awards and honors ==
- Rickey Henderson, ALCS Most Valuable Player
- Dave Stewart, World Series MVP

All-Star Game

- Dave Stewart, pitcher
- Terry Steinbach, catcher, starter
- Mark McGwire, first Base, starter
- José Canseco, outfield, reserve
- Mike Moore, pitcher, reserve
- Tony La Russa, manager

=== Team leaders ===
- Games – Dave Henderson (152)
- At-Bats – Dave Henderson (579)
- Runs – Carney Lansford (81)
- Hits – Carney Lansford (185)
- Doubles – Carney Lansford (28)
- Triples – Tony Phillips (6)
- Home Runs – Mark McGwire (33)
- Runs Batted In – Dave Parker
- Walks – Mark McGwire (83)
- Batting average – Carney Lansford (.336)
- On Base Percentage – Rickey Henderson (.425)
- Slugging Average – José Canseco (.542)
- Stolen Bases – Rickey Henderson (52)
- Wins – Dave Stewart (21)
- Innings Pitched – Dave Stewart (257.2)
- Earned Run Average – Mike Moore (2.61)
- Strikeouts – Mike Moore (172)

== Farm system ==
Level	Team	League	Manager
AAA	Tacoma Tigers	Pacific Coast League	Brad Fischer
AA	Huntsville Stars	Southern League	Jeff Newman
A	Modesto A's	California League	Lenn Sakata and Ted Kubiak
A	Madison Muskies	Midwest League	Jim Nettles
A-Short Season	Southern Oregon A's	Northwest League	Grady Fuson
Rookie	AZL Athletics	Arizona League	Casey Parsons
