= 1990 Oakland Athletics season =

Major League Baseball season

1990 Oakland Athletics
- American League champions American League West champions
- League: American League
- Division: West
- Ballpark: Oakland–Alameda County Coliseum
- City: Oakland, California
- Record: 103–59 (.636)
- Divisional place: 1st
- Owners: Walter A. Haas, Jr.
- General managers: Sandy Alderson
- Managers: Tony La Russa
- Television: KPIX/KICU-TV; Sports Channel Bay Area (Monte Moore, Ray Fosse)
- Radio: KSFO (Bill King, Lon Simmons, Ray Fosse); KNTA (Amaury Pi-Gonzalez, Erwin Higueros)

The Oakland Athletics' 1990 season was their 23rd season in Oakland, California and the 90th in franchise history. The team finished first in the American League West with a record of 103 wins 59 losses.

The Athletics' 1990 campaign ranks among the organization's finest. Oakland, by winning 103 games, led the league outright in wins for a third consecutive season; they remained the last major North American team to accomplish this until 2017, when the feat was matched by the nearby Golden State Warriors of the NBA. The Athletics benefited from stellar performances in all areas of the game. The team's offense was led by eventual Hall-of-Famer Rickey Henderson, who finished the season with 65 stolen bases, 28 home runs, a .325 batting average, and took home the 1990 American League MVP Award. The Athletics benefited from strong performances by superstars Mark McGwire and Jose Canseco. The pair clubbed 39 and 37 home runs, respectively; in doing so, they drove in a combined total of 209 runs. Over the course of the season, the team added to an already strong offense; the additions of recent All-Stars Willie Randolph, Willie McGee, and Harold Baines further widened the gap between the Athletics and the rest of the league. Established veterans (such as Carney Lansford, Terry Steinbach, Dave Henderson, and Mike Gallego) and promising young players (mainly Walt Weiss and Mike Bordick) rounded out arguably the deepest roster in all of Major League Baseball. Eight of the Athletics' nine main postseason starters (R. Henderson, McGwire, Canseco, McGee, Steinbach, Randolph, Baines, and Lansford) played in at least one All-Star Game between 1988 and 1990.

The Athletics pitching staff, in many regards, had an even stronger campaign. The starting rotation was led by veteran Bob Welch. Welch would finish the season with both an MLB-leading 27 wins and a 2.95 ERA; this performance was strong enough to net the 1990 Cy Young Award. Welch, as of 2021, remains the last MLB pitcher to win at least 25 games in a season. Fellow starter Dave Stewart, winner of 22 games, finished in a tie (with Pittsburgh starter Doug Drabek) for the second-most wins in MLB. 1989 All-Star Mike Moore, 1991 All-Star Scott Sanderson, and longtime Athletic Curt Young rounded out the American League's top rotation. The Athletics' bullpen was led by superstar closer Dennis Eckersley, who posted a microscopic 0.61 ERA while recording 48 saves. As a team, the Athletics allowed only 570 runs (the fewest in the American League by a wide margin).

The Athletics easily won the American League West for a third consecutive season, en route to a third consecutive AL Pennant with a four-game sweep of the Boston Red Sox. The Athletics entered the 1990 World Series as heavy favorites, but were swept by the Cincinnati Reds. Neither team has reached the World Series since.

== Offseason ==
- November 28, 1989: Rickey Henderson signed as a free agent with the Oakland Athletics.
- December 13, 1989: The Athletics sign Scott Sanderson as a free agent.
- December 13, 1989: Jamie Quirk was signed as a free agent with the Oakland Athletics.

== Regular season ==
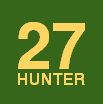
Catfish
Hunter
Pitcher:
1965-67(KC)
1968-74(OAK)
Retired 1990

- June 4, 1990: Todd Van Poppel was drafted by the Oakland Athletics in the 1st round (14th pick) of the 1990 amateur draft. Player signed July 16, 1990.
- June 20, 1990 – Terry Steinbach has 6 RBIs in one game versus the Detroit Tigers.
- July 25, 1990 – Jose Canseco had 6 RBIs in a game against the California Angels.

=== Season standings ===
AL West
Team	W	L	Pct.	GB	Home	Road
Oakland Athletics	103	59	.636	—	51‍–‍30	52‍–‍29
Chicago White Sox	94	68	.580	9	49‍–‍31	45‍–‍37
Texas Rangers	83	79	.512	20	47‍–‍35	36‍–‍44
California Angels	80	82	.494	23	42‍–‍39	38‍–‍43
Seattle Mariners	77	85	.475	26	38‍–‍43	39‍–‍42
Kansas City Royals	75	86	.466	27½	45‍–‍36	30‍–‍50
Minnesota Twins	74	88	.457	29	41‍–‍40	33‍–‍48

=== Record vs. opponents ===
1990 American League record Sources:
Team	BAL	BOS	CAL	CWS	CLE	DET	KC	MIL	MIN	NYY	OAK	SEA	TEX	TOR
Baltimore	—	4–9	7–5	6–6	6–7	6–7	8–3	7–6	6–6	6–7	4–8	3–9	8–4	5–8
Boston	9–4	—	7–5	6–6	9–4	8–5	4–8	5–8	4–8	9–4	4–8	8–4	5–7	10–3
California	5–7	5–7	—	5–8	7–5	5–7	7–6	7–5	9–4	6–6	4–9	5–8	8–5	7–5
Chicago	6–6	6–6	8–5	—	5–7	5–7	9–4	10–2	7–6	10–2	8–5	8–5	7–6	5–7
Cleveland	7–6	4–9	5–7	7–5	—	5–8	6–6	9–4	7–5	5–8	4–8	7–5	7–5	4–9
Detroit	7–6	5–8	7–5	7–5	8–5	—	5–7	3–10	6–6	7–6	6–6	7–5	6–6	5–8
Kansas City	3–8	8–4	6–7	4–9	6–6	7–5	—	4–8	8–5	8–4	4–9	7–6	5–8	5–7
Milwaukee	6–7	8–5	5–7	2–10	4–9	10–3	8–4	—	4–8	6–7	5–7	4–8	5–7	7–6
Minnesota	6–6	8–4	4–9	6–7	5–7	6–6	5–8	8–4	—	6–6	6–7	6–7	5–8	3–9
New York	7–6	4–9	6–6	2–10	8–5	6–7	4–8	7–6	6–6	—	0–12	9–3	3–9	5–8
Oakland	8–4	8–4	9–4	5–8	8–4	6–6	9–4	7–5	7–6	12–0	—	9–4	8–5	7–5
Seattle	9–3	4–8	8–5	5–8	5–7	5–7	6–7	8–4	7–6	3–9	4–9	—	7–6	6–6
Texas	4–8	7–5	5–8	6–7	5–7	6–6	8–5	7–5	8–5	9–3	5–8	6–7	—	7–5
Toronto	8–5	3–10	5–7	7–5	9–4	8–5	7–5	6–7	9–3	8–5	5–7	6–6	5–7	—

=== Notable transactions ===
- May 13, 1990: Willie Randolph was traded by the Los Angeles Dodgers to the Oakland Athletics for Stan Javier.
- June 17, 1990: Ken Phelps was purchased by the Cleveland Indians from the Oakland Athletics.
- July 15, 1990: Mike Norris was released by the Oakland Athletics.
- August 1, 1990: Ron Coomer was released by the Oakland Athletics.
- August 29, 1990: Willie McGee was traded by the St. Louis Cardinals to the Oakland Athletics for Felix Jose, Stan Royer, and Daryl Green (minors).

==== Draft picks ====
- June 4, 1990: Ernie Young was drafted by the Oakland Athletics in the 10th round of the 1990 amateur draft. Player signed June 7, 1990.
- June 4, 1990: Izzy Molina was drafted by the Oakland Athletics in the 22nd round of the 1990 amateur draft. Player signed June 28, 1990.

=== Roster ===
1990 Oakland Athletics
Roster
Pitchers: 59 Joe Bitker; 54 Todd Burns; 49 Steve Chitren; 43 Dennis Eckersley; 57 Reggie Harris; 40 Rick Honeycutt; 58 Joe Klink; 21 Mike Moore; 19 Gene Nelson; 17 Mike Norris; 38 Dave Otto; 22 Scott Sanderson; 34 Dave Stewart; 35 Bob Welch; 29 Curt Young	Catchers: 52 Troy Afenir; 27 Ron Hassey; 3,6 Jamie Quirk; 36 Terry Steinbach; Infielders: 12 Lance Blankenship; 46 Mike Bordick; 9 Mike Gallego; 39 Scott Hemond; 4 Carney Lansford; 25 Mark McGwire; 44 Ken Phelps; 30 Willie Randolph; 7 Walt Weiss	Outfielders: 33 José Canseco; 55 Ozzie Canseco; 42 Dave Henderson; 24 Rickey Henderson; 48 Steve Howard; 23 Dann Howitt; 28 Stan Javier; 2 Doug Jennings; 6,14 Félix José; 16 Darren Lewis; 51 Willie McGee; Designated Hitters: 3 Harold Baines	Manager: 10 Tony La Russa; Coaches: 18 Dave Duncan (pitching); 5 Art Kusnyer (bullpen); 15 Rene Lachemann (third base); 8 Dave McKay (first base); 45 Merv Rettenmund (hitting); 47 Tommie Reynolds (bench)

=== Dave Stewart's No-Hitter ===
On June 29, Dave Stewart no-hit the Toronto Blue Jays by a score of 5–0.

== Player stats ==
= Indicates team leader

= Indicates league leader

=== Batting ===
==== Starters by position ====
Note: Pos = Position; G = Games played; AB = At bats; H = Hits; Avg. = Batting average; HR = Home runs; RBI = Runs batted in

Pos.	Player	G	AB	H	Avg.	HR	RBI
C	Terry Steinbach	114	379	95	.291	9	57
1B	Mark McGwire	156	523	123	.235	39	108
2B	Willie Randolph	93	292	75	.257	1	21
3B	Carney Lansford	134	507	136	.268	3	50
SS	Walt Weiss	138	445	118	.265	2	35
LF	Rickey Henderson	136	489	159	.325	28	61
CF	Dave Henderson	127	450	122	.264	20	63
RF	José Canseco	131	481	132	.274	37	101
DH	Harold Baines	32	94	25	.266	3	21

==== Other batters ====
Note: G = Games played; AB = At bats; H = Hits; Avg. = Batting average; HR = Home runs; RBI = Runs batted in

Player	G	AB	H	Avg.	HR	RBI
Mike Gallego	140	389	80	.206	3	34
Félix José	101	341	90	.264	8	39
Ron Hassey	94	254	54	.213	5	22
Doug Jennings	64	156	30	.192	2	14
Lance Blankenship	86	136	26	.191	0	10
Jamie Quirk	56	121	34	.281	3	26
Willie McGee	29	113	31	.274	0	15
Ken Phelps	32	59	11	.186	1	6
Steve Howard	21	52	12	.231	0	1
Darren Lewis	25	35	8	.229	0	1
Stan Javier	19	33	8	.242	0	3
Dann Howitt	14	22	3	.136	0	1
Ozzie Canseco	9	19	2	.105	0	1
Troy Afenir	14	14	2	.143	0	2
Mike Bordick	25	14	1	.071	0	0
Scott Hemond	7	13	2	.154	0	1
Rick Honeycutt	5	2	0	.000	0	0

=== Pitching ===
==== Starting pitchers ====
Note: G = Games pitched; IP = Innings pitched; W = Wins; L = Losses; ERA = Earned run average; SO = Strikeouts

Player	G	IP	W	L	ERA	SO
Dave Stewart	36	267.0	22	11	2.56	166
Bob Welch	35	238.0	27	6	2.95	127
Scott Sanderson	34	206.1	17	11	3.88	128
Mike Moore	33	199.1	13	15	4.65	73
Curt Young	26	124.1	9	6	4.85	56

==== Other pitchers ====
Note: G = Games pitched; IP = Innings pitched; W = Wins; L = Losses; ERA = Earned run average; SO = Strikeouts

Player	G	IP	W	L	ERA	SO
Reggie Harris	16	41.1	1	0	3.48	31
Mike Norris	14	27.0	1	0	3.00	16
Steve Chitren	8	17.2	1	0	1.02	19
Dave Otto	2	2.1	0	0	7.71	2

==== Relief pitchers ====
Note: G = Games pitched; W = Wins; L = Losses; SV = Saves; ERA = Earned run average; SO = Strikeouts

Player	G	W	L	SV	ERA	SO
Dennis Eckersley	63	4	2	48	0.61	73
Rick Honeycutt	63	2	2	7	2.70	38
Gene Nelson	51	3	3	5	1.57	38
Todd Burns	43	3	3	3	2.97	43
Joe Klink	40	0	0	1	2.04	19
Joe Bitker	1	0	0	0	0.00	2

== ALCS ==
=== Game 1 ===
October 6, 1990, at Fenway Park

Team	1	2	3	4	5	6	7	8	9	R	H	E
Oakland	0	0	0	0	0	0	1	1	7	9	13	0
Boston	0	0	0	1	0	0	0	0	0	1	5	1
W: Dave Stewart (1-0) L: Larry Andersen (0-1)
HR: BOS – Wade Boggs (1)

=== Game 2 ===
October 7, 1990, at Fenway Park

Team	1	2	3	4	5	6	7	8	9	R	H	E
Oakland	0	0	0	1	0	0	1	0	2	4	13	1
Boston	0	0	1	0	0	0	0	0	0	1	6	0
W: Bob Welch (1-0) L: Greg Harris (0-1) S: Dennis Eckersley (1)
HR: None

=== Game 3 ===
October 9, 1990, at Oakland–Alameda County Coliseum

Team	1	2	3	4	5	6	7	8	9	R	H	E
Boston	0	1	0	0	0	0	0	0	0	1	8	3
Oakland	0	0	0	2	0	2	0	0	x	4	6	0
W: Mike Moore (1-0) L: Mike Boddicker (0-1) S: Dennis Eckersley (2)
HR: None

=== Game 4 ===
October 10, 1990, at Oakland–Alameda County Coliseum

Team	1	2	3	4	5	6	7	8	9	R	H	E
Boston	0	0	0	0	0	0	0	0	1	1	4	1
Oakland	0	3	0	0	0	0	0	0	x	3	6	0
W: Dave Stewart (2-0) L: Roger Clemens (0-1) S: Rick Honeycutt (1)
HR: None

== The 1990 World Series ==
The four-game sweep to the Reds in the 1990, was reminiscent of the A's loss to the Boston Braves 76 years earlier.

NL Cincinnati Reds (4) vs. AL Oakland Athletics (0)

Game	Score	Date	Location	Attendance	Time of Game
1	A's – 0, Reds – 7	October 16	Riverfront Stadium (Cincinnati)	55,830	2:48
2	A's – 4, Reds – 5 (10 inns)	October 17	Riverfront Stadium (Cincinnati)	55,832	3:31
3	Reds – 8, A's – 3	October 19	Oakland–Alameda County Coliseum (Oakland)	48,269	3:01
4	Reds – 2, A's – 1	October 20	Oakland–Alameda County Coliseum (Oakland)	48,613	2:48

== Awards and honors ==
- Rickey Henderson, American League Most Valuable Player
- Dave Stewart, ALCS MVP
- Dave Stewart, Pitcher, Roberto Clemente Award
- Bob Welch, AL Cy Young Award

All-Star Game

- Jose Canseco, outfielder
- Dennis Eckersley, relief pitcher
- Rickey Henderson, outfielder
- Mark McGwire, first baseman
- Bob Welch, starting pitcher
- Tony La Russa, manager

=== Team leaders ===
- Home Runs – Mark McGwire (39)
- RBI – Mark McGwire (108)
- Batting Average – Rickey Henderson (.325)
- Hits – Rickey Henderson (159)
- Stolen Bases – Rickey Henderson (65)
- Walks – Mark McGwire (110)
- Wins – Bob Welch (27)
- Earned Run Average – Dave Stewart (2.56)
- Strikeouts – Dave Stewart (166)

== Farm system ==
Level	Team	League	Manager
AAA	Tacoma Tigers	Pacific Coast League	Brad Fischer
AA	Huntsville Stars	Southern League	Jeff Newman
A	Modesto A's	California League	Ted Kubiak
A	Madison Muskies	Midwest League	Casey Parsons
A-Short Season	Southern Oregon A's	Northwest League	Grady Fuson
Rookie	AZL Athletics	Arizona League	Gary Jones
