= Bob Welch (baseball) =

American baseball player (1956–2014)

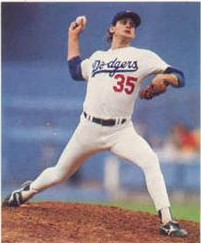
- Pitcher
- Born: November 3, 1956; Detroit, Michigan, U.S.
- Died: June 9, 2014 (aged 57); Seal Beach, California, U.S.
- Batted: Right Threw: Right

MLB debut
- June 20, 1978, for the Los Angeles Dodgers

Last MLB appearance
- August 11, 1994, for the Oakland Athletics

MLB statistics
- Win–loss record: 211–146
- Earned run average: 3.47
- Strikeouts: 1,969
- Stats at Baseball Reference

Teams
- Los Angeles Dodgers (1978–1987); Oakland Athletics (1988–1994)

Career highlights and awards
- 2× All-Star (1980, 1990); 3× World Series champion (1981, 1989, 2001); AL Cy Young Award (1990); MLB wins leader (1990)

Robert Lynn Welch (November 3, 1956 – June 9, 2014) was an American professional baseball starting pitcher. He played in Major League Baseball (MLB) for the Los Angeles Dodgers (1978–87) and Oakland Athletics (1988–94). Prior to his professional career, he attended Eastern Michigan University, where he played college baseball for the Hurons baseball team. He helped lead the Hurons, coached by Ron Oestrike, to the 1976 College World Series, losing to Arizona in the championship game. He also played for the U.S. national collegiate team in 1976.

Welch was a two-time MLB All-Star, and he won the American League Cy Young Award in 1990. He was a three-time World Series champion – twice as a player and once as a coach.

He is the most recent major league pitcher to win at least 25 games in a single season, 27 in 1990, the most wins in a season since Steve Carlton also won 27 games in 1972.

== Playing career ==
In a 17-year career, Welch compiled a 211–146 record with 1,969 strikeouts and a 3.47 ERA in 3,092 innings. His 137 wins during the 1980s ranked third among major league pitchers during that decade, following Jack Morris and Dave Stieb. Welch won the American League (AL) Cy Young Award in 1990 while pitching for the Oakland Athletics. He threw two complete games in 1990, both of them shutouts. Welch finished in the top 10 voting for the National League Cy Young Award twice (1983 and 1987).

=== Los Angeles Dodgers ===
Welch gained national fame with the Dodgers during their 1978 season, when as a 21-year-old rookie, he struck out Reggie Jackson of the New York Yankees with two men on base and two out in the top of the ninth inning of Game 2 of the World Series.

On May 29, 1980, Welch pitched a 3–0 one-hitter against the Atlanta Braves, facing the minimum 27 batters. The only Atlanta base runner was Larvell Blanks, who singled in the fourth inning and was retired on a double play.

Welch won the 1981 World Series, his first, as the Dodgers defeated the Yankees in six games.

In 1983, Welch became the sixth pitcher to throw a complete-game shutout and hit a solo home run for his team's only run. This was next accomplished by Noah Syndergaard in 2019.

=== Oakland Athletics ===
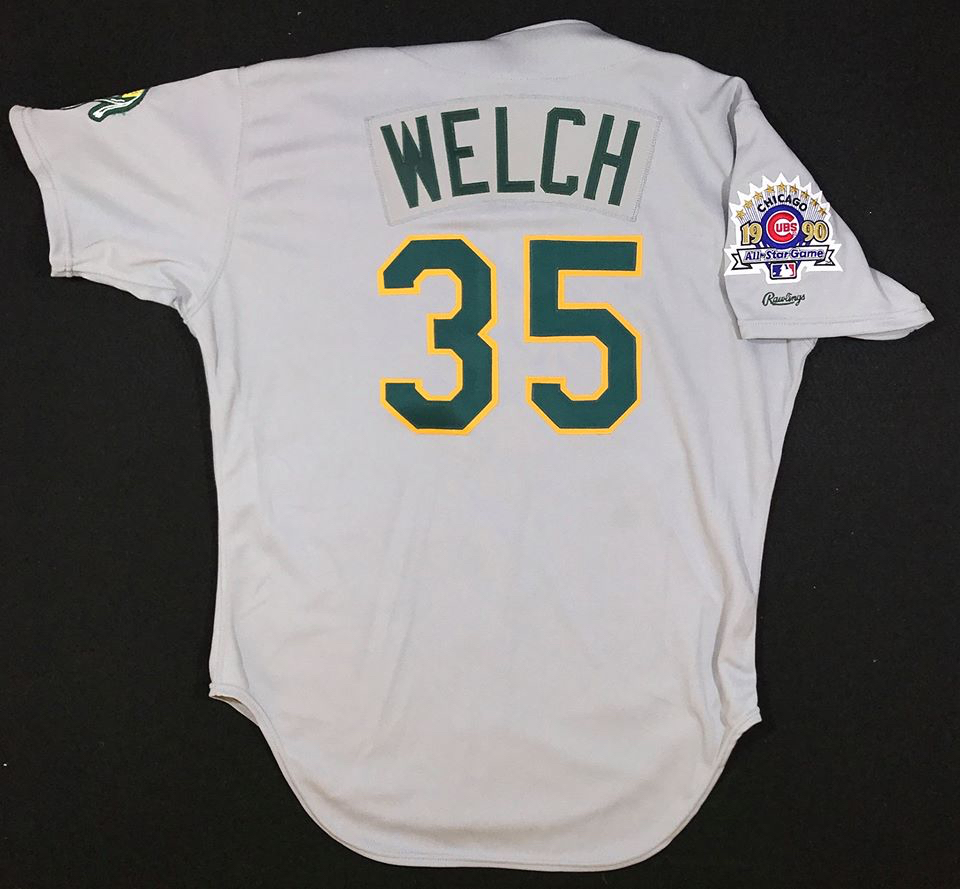
1990 Oakland Athletics #35 Bob Welch All-Star Game road jersey

Welch was the third pitcher in the starting rotation for the 1989 World Series champion Oakland A's, compiling a regular-season record of 17–8 and recording a win in his only start in the AL Championship Series against the Toronto Blue Jays. In an odd twist of fate, however, Welch did not throw a single pitch against the San Francisco Giants during the World Series itself. Minutes before Welch was to take the mound in Game 3, Candlestick Park and the Bay Area were struck by the Loma Prieta earthquake, which caused extensive damage in the region and forced the postponement of the game. When the Series was resumed 11 days later, A's manager Tony La Russa opted to re-use his Game 1 starter, Dave Stewart, for Game 3 in place of Welch, and his Game 2 starter, Mike Moore, for Game 4 in place of originally scheduled starter Storm Davis. The strategy worked, as the A's swept the Series in four games, giving Welch his second World Series title.

A two-time All-Star (1980 and 1990), Welch won at least 14 games in eight seasons, with a career-high 27 in 1990. He won the Cy Young Award that season and finished ninth in AL MVP voting. His 27 wins were the most by any pitcher since Steve Carlton also won 27 in 1972, and, as of 2025, stands as the last time a pitcher has won 25 or more games in a season (the closest anyone has come to that mark since is 24, accomplished by John Smoltz in 1996, Randy Johnson in 2002, and Justin Verlander in 2011). The last pitcher to win more games in a season was Denny McLain, with 31 wins in 1968. Nineteen of Welch's wins were saved by Dennis Eckersley, which remains a record.

Welch was the starting pitcher of Game 2 of the 1990 World Series against the Cincinnati Reds. His personal catcher throughout much of his Oakland Athletics career was Ron Hassey, as opposed to Terry Steinbach, who caught the majority of the Oakland pitching staff.

Welch retired after the 1994 season.

== Coaching career ==
Welch was the pitching coach for the Arizona Diamondbacks when they won the World Series in 2001. During the 2006 World Baseball Classic, Welch served as the pitching coach for the Netherlands national baseball team. Welch was a pitching coach in the Oakland Athletics organization at the time of his death.

== Personal life and death ==
Welch's father worked in an airplane factory in Michigan. Welch and his older brother grew up in Hazel Park, Michigan.

Welch and his wife of 30 years had three children. Their son Riley was a 34th round selection by the Oakland A's in the 2008 MLB draft out of Desert Mountain High School in Scottsdale, Arizona, but did not sign and went on to play college baseball at Yavapi College, then for the Hawaii Rainbow Warriors. Riley then signed as an undrafted free agent with the Dodgers, pitching in the minors in 2012. He became a pitching coach at Presentation College, an NAIA school in Aberdeen, South Dakota, in 2014 and was a volunteer coach at Hawaii in 2016.

=== Autobiography and alcoholism ===
In 1981, Welch and The New York Times sports columnist George Vecsey co-wrote “Five O'Clock Comes Early: A Young Man's Battle With Alcoholism” which was re-released in 1991 as "Five O'Clock Comes Early: A Cy Young Award-Winner Recounts His Greatest Victory", which chronicled Welch's battle with alcoholism that he said started at the age of sixteen: "I would get a buzz on and I would stop being afraid of girls. I was shy, but with a couple of beers in me, it was all right."

The book "...marked one of the first times an active professional athlete openly discussed a drinking addiction." An updated version was published after Welch's retirement, and the book was re-released digitally the year after Welch's death, on November 10, 2015.

Hall of Fame pitcher CC Sabathia wrote that Welch's book was an inspiration while he was in rehab.

=== Death ===
Welch died of a broken neck resulting from an accidental fall in the bathroom of his Seal Beach, California, home on June 9, 2014, at the age of 57. The Orange County Coroner's Office ruled that Welch suffered a cervical spine fracture "with epidural hemorrhage due to hyperextension of neck" suffered in the fall, negating earlier reports that he had died from a heart attack.

== Highlights ==
- American League (AL) Cy Young Award winner (1990)
- Two-time All-Star (1980, 1990)
- Led AL in wins (27, 1990)
- Led National League in shutouts (4, 1987)
- Led AL in games started (35, 1991)
- Tied at #98 on the all-time MLB wins leaderboard, as of the end of the 2025 season
- Third-most wins in MLB in the 1980s

== Publications ==
- Welch, Bob; Vecsey, George (1991). Five O'Clock Comes Early: A Cy Young Award-Winner Recounts His Greatest Victory. Fireside. ISBN 978-0671745608.

== See also ==
- List of Major League Baseball career wins leaders
- List of Major League Baseball annual wins leaders

Preceded by Dave Stewart	American League All-Star Game Starting Pitcher; 1990	Succeeded by Jack Morris
