= Dave Parker =

American baseball player (1951–2025)

- Parker with the Pittsburgh Pirates in 1982
- Right fielder / Designated hitter
- Born: June 9, 1951; Grenada, Mississippi, U.S.
- Died: June 28, 2025 (aged 74); Cincinnati, Ohio, U.S.
- Batted: Left Threw: Right

MLB debut
- July 12, 1973, for the Pittsburgh Pirates

Last MLB appearance
- October 2, 1991, for the Toronto Blue Jays

MLB statistics
- Batting average: .290
- Hits: 2,712
- Home runs: 339
- Runs batted in: 1,493
- Stats at Baseball Reference

Teams
- Pittsburgh Pirates (1973–1983); Cincinnati Reds (1984–1987); Oakland Athletics (1988–1989); Milwaukee Brewers (1990); California Angels (1991); Toronto Blue Jays (1991)

Career highlights and awards
- 7× All-Star (1977, 1979–1981, 1985, 1986, 1990); 2× World Series champion (1979, 1989); NL MVP (1978); 3× Gold Glove Award (1977–1979); 3× Silver Slugger Award (1985, 1986, 1990); 2× NL batting champion (1977, 1978); NL RBI leader (1985); Pittsburgh Pirates Hall of Fame; Cincinnati Reds Hall of Fame; Milwaukee Brewers Wall of Honor

Member of the National

Baseball Hall of Fame
- Induction: 2025
- Vote: 87.5%
- Election method: Classic Baseball Era Committee

David Gene Parker (June 9, 1951 – June 28, 2025), nicknamed "the Cobra", was an American professional baseball player. He played in Major League Baseball as a right fielder from 1973 to 1991. A seven-time All-Star, Parker won two National League (NL) batting titles and was the 1978 NL Most Valuable Player. He was a member of two World Series championship teams, winning with the Pittsburgh Pirates in 1979 and the Oakland Athletics in 1989.

Parker was the first American athlete to earn an average of $1 million per year, having signed a five-year, $5 million contract in January 1979. Parker's career achievements include 2,712 hits, 339 home runs, 1,493 runs batted in, and a lifetime batting average of .290. Parker was also known as a solid defensive outfielder during the first half of his career with a powerful arm, winning three straight Gold Glove Awards during his prime. From 1975 to 1979, he threw out 72 runners, including 26 in 1977. In 2025, Parker was elected to the Baseball Hall of Fame. He died 29 days before he was to be inducted.

== Early life ==
David Gene Parker was born in Grenada, Mississippi, on June 9, 1951, and grew up in Cincinnati near Crosley Field, where he learned to play baseball on the stadium's parking lots. His father, Dick Parker, was a shipping clerk in a foundry. Dave Parker attended Courter Tech High School. He said his favorite sport was football, and he starred at tailback but he injured a knee in a game during his senior year and gave up the game. Also a baseball star, one of his fondest memories was playing at Western Hills High School, where he hit a home run that landed on the roof of a Frisch's restaurant.

== Playing career ==
=== Pittsburgh Pirates ===
Parker commenced his Major League Baseball career in 1973, when the Pittsburgh Pirates elevated him from the minor leagues. He adopted a unique approach to warming up in the on-deck circle, utilizing a sledgehammer, in contrast to the customary lead-weighted bat employed by most batters. In 1977, Parker was the National League batting champion, a feat he subsequently repeated in 1978 when he was also named the National League Most Valuable Player (MVP). During his MVP campaign, Parker led the National League in slugging percentage (.585), on-base plus slugging (.979), and total bases (340).

Parker bats for Pittsburgh c. 1982

He achieved these statistics despite a collision with John Stearns at home plate during a game against the New York Mets on June 30, 1978, in which he sustained a fractured jaw and cheekbone. A specially crafted hockey mask allowed him to return in a little over two weeks. Because the mask hindered his ability to see pitches, he tried a series of modified football helmets with—and ultimately without—a facemask that he only wore when running the bases. The gear was controversial among opposing players because it enhanced his already imposing presence, and they feared being injured when defending against his unabated physical play. However, neither the league nor umpires disallowed it, and he continued using it until voluntarily giving it up in the early 1979 season. Over the years, a handful of major leaguers recovering from facial injuries adopted similar equipment, and masked-helmet use became common in Little League and high school baseball and softball.

The next year, Pirates rewarded him with a five-year deal that was American sports' first million-dollar-per-year contract. The increase over his reported $225,000 annual salary angered working-class Pittsburgh fans struggling with the declining coal and steel industries, who saw all millionaires as "pillars of greed." Six years later, now playing for Cincinnati, Parker said that hitting .310 with 25 homers and 94 RBI the prior season apparently wasn't enough for the money, with fans instead expecting a .330 average with 35 home runs and 124 RBI. Pitcher Kent Tekulve also recalled that fans "threw bags of nuts and bolts at him", batteries, live bullets—and in one instance, a souvenir bat. Off the field, his cars were vandalized, he received death threats and racist hate mail, including being told to, "go back to Africa." Asked at the time whether there was racism in baseball, Parker answered, "Not only toward Black people. I'm talking about anybody." He went on to say Black players got fewer endorsements despite being the stars of a majority of teams, and that he believed there were quotas that would limit the number of Blacks on the field to no more than six at a time.

Parker's power hitting resulted in an at-bat that "knocked the cover off the ball" upon landing in the outfield, complicating the subsequent attempt to return it to play. Parker proved to be an instrumental part of the Pirates' 1979 World Series championship team and their only member to make the United Press International all-star selection at the end of the 1979 season.

In 1981, at a juncture in his career when he appeared poised to rank among the game's all-time greats, Lawrence Ritter and Donald Honig included him in their seminal work, "The 100 Greatest Baseball Players of All Time." The authors, acknowledging Parker's subsequent success at replacing Roberto Clemente at the right field position, remarked, "Someone must have a fondness for right field in Pittsburgh."

Despite his dominating offensive performance in the late 1970s, by the early 1980s, Parker's batting prowess waned due to sustained injuries, weight-related issues, and his escalating cocaine consumption. He became a central figure in a pervasive drug scandal that permeated the major leagues, involving drug dealer Curtis Strong. Consequently, the Pirates initiated legal action against him in 1986, as they still owed deferred payments on his 1979 contract, alleging his breach of contractual obligations. Parker and the team mutually resolved the matter through an out-of-court settlement.

=== Later career ===
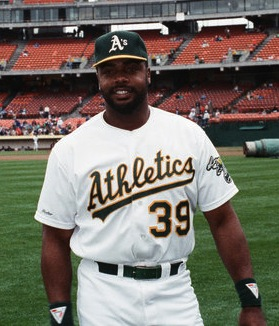
Parker with the Athletics in 1989

At the end of the 1983 season, Parker became a free agent and signed with the Cincinnati Reds on December 7, 1983. In Cincinnati, his hometown, he returned to the form that made him an all-star in Pittsburgh. In 1985, he enjoyed his best season since 1978, finishing with a .312 batting average and 34 home runs. He also led the National League with 125 RBIs, 42 doubles, 80 extra-base hits, and 350 total bases. Parker was also the winner of the league's first Home Run Derby at the 1985 All-Star Game when he hit six home runs in ten attempts. At the end of the season, Parker finished second in 1985 MVP voting to Willie McGee. Parker was among several players who testified against a dealer in the Pittsburgh drug trials. Named as "regular users", Parker and six other players were suspended for the following season. The sentences were commuted, however, in exchange for donating ten percent of their base salaries to drug-related community service, submitting to random drug testing, and contributing 100 hours of drug-related community service.

After the 1987 season, Cincinnati traded Parker to the Oakland Athletics for José Rijo and Tim Birtsas on December 8, 1987. In Oakland, Parker was able to extend his career by spending most of his time as a designated hitter (DH). Injuries and age caught up to him to a degree; he hit just .257 with 12 homers in 377 at-bats in 1988 and .264 with 22 homers in 553 at-bats in 1989.

After winning the 1989 World Series with Oakland, on December 3, 1989, Parker signed a two-year contract with the Milwaukee Brewers. He had a solid year as the Brewers' DH with a .289 average and 21 home runs in 610 at-bats, and was selected as a reserve for the 1990 All-Star Game. The next season Milwaukee opted for youth, and on March 14, 1991, traded the aging Parker to the Angels for Dante Bichette.

Parker's last season was 1991. He played for the California Angels until late in the season before being released on September 7. The Toronto Blue Jays then signed him as insurance for the pennant race on September 14. Jays general manager Pat Gillick signed him at the league minimum wage of $11,500, or $650 per game, with 19 remaining games in the season. Parker went 12 for 37, for a batting average of .324 for the limited action he had as the Jays' DH in the final stretch of the season. Since he was acquired so late in the season, he did not qualify for inclusion on the postseason roster and was unable to play in the 1991 American League Championship Series against the Minnesota Twins. He became a free agent following the end of the season. The Chicago White Sox were the only team showing interest in him as a possible backup for Bo Jackson in March 1992. But with the Sox signing former Blue Jay George Bell on April 2, 1992, Parker had no other potential offers to continue playing in the major leagues.

== Career statistics ==
G	AB	R	H	2B	3B	HR	TB	RBI	SB	BB	AVG	OBP	SLG	OPS	FLD%
2466	9358	1272	2712	526	75	339	4405	1493	154	683	.290	.339	.471	.810	.966

In 30 postseason games, Parker batted .234 (26-for-111) with 11 runs, five doubles, three home runs, 11 RBI, and seven walks.

Additionally, Parker played three winter league seasons in Venezuela — 1974–75, 1976–77, and 1982–83 — all with the Navegantes del Magallanes. Over the course of his LVBP career, he posted a .347 batting average with 150 hits, 32 walks, and 88 runs batted in.

== Post-retirement, personal life, and death ==
Parker served as a first-base coach for the Anaheim Angels in 1997, a batting coach for the St. Louis Cardinals in 1998. He was elected to the Reds Hall of Fame Class of 2014, which also included fellow Cincinnati natives Ron Oester and Ken Griffey Jr. In 2012, he was inducted into the Cincinnati Public Schools Athletic Hall of Fame. That same year, he was inducted into the Navegantes del Magallanes Hall of Fame. On September 3, 2022, he was inducted into the Pittsburgh Pirates Hall of Fame as part of its inaugural class.

Parker never got more than 24% of votes on Baseball Hall of Fame ballots, and his 15-year Baseball Writers' Association of America eligibility was exhausted on the 2011 ballot. Supporters of Parker's candidacy argue that his involvement with the Pittsburgh drug trials contributed to his not being voted into the Hall of Fame, which may have also harmed the candidacies of Keith Hernandez (who never received more than 10.8% and fell off the writers' ballot after nine appearances) and Tim Raines (who was not elected until his 10th year on the ballot, after debuting at 24.3%), serving as a precursor to those listed on the Mitchell Report not being voted into the Hall of Fame due to steroid abuse. He appeared on the Classic Baseball Era Committee's 2025 ballot and was elected with 87.5% of the vote (appearing on 14 of 16 ballots) on December 8, 2024. He was posthumously inducted on July 27, 2025. His son, Dave Parker II, accepted the plaque and spoke on his behalf.

Parker had six children. He lived in Loveland, Ohio, near Cincinnati, with his wife, Kellye. He owned several Popeyes chicken franchises in Cincinnati for about 22 years, before selling them after being diagnosed with Parkinson's disease in 2012. In 2013, he confirmed to the Pittsburgh Tribune-Review that he had been diagnosed with Parkinson's within the past year. He was involved in raising money to find a cure for Parkinson's through the Dave Parker 39 Foundation.

Parker died from complications of Parkinson's disease on June 28, 2025, at the age of 74.

== See also ==
- List of Major League Baseball career home run leaders
- List of Major League Baseball career hits leaders
- List of Major League Baseball career doubles leaders
- List of Major League Baseball career runs scored leaders
- List of Major League Baseball career runs batted in leaders
- List of Major League Baseball annual runs batted in leaders
- List of Major League Baseball batting champions
- List of Major League Baseball annual doubles leaders
- List of Major League Baseball career stolen bases leaders
- List of Major League Baseball career total bases leaders
- List of St. Louis Cardinals coaches
- List of doping cases in sport

Awards and achievements
Preceded by Pete Rose; Dale Murphy	National League Player of the Month; August & September 1978; May 1985	Succeeded by George Foster; Pedro Guerrero
Preceded by Bill Lachemann	Anaheim Angels First Base Coach; 1997	Succeeded by George Hendrick
Preceded by George Hendrick	St. Louis Cardinals Hitting Coach; 1998	Succeeded by Mike Easler
