= Stan Javier =

Dominican baseball player (born 1964)

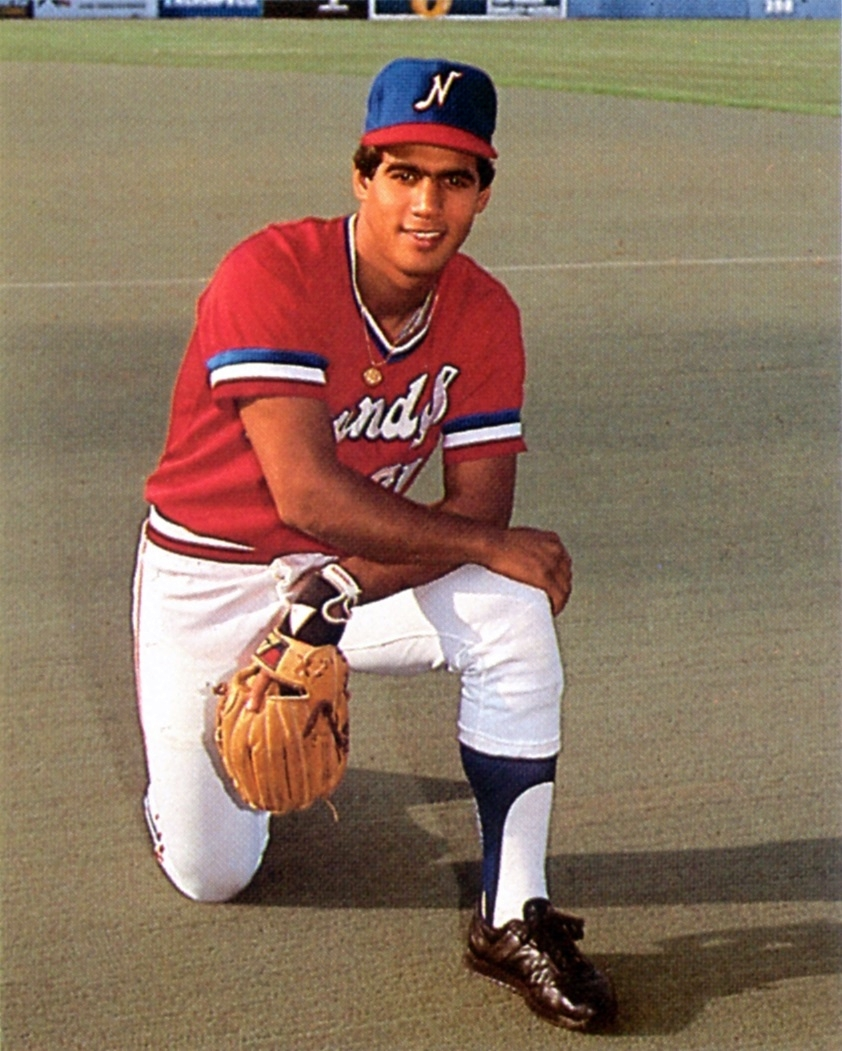
- Javier with the Nashville Sounds in 1984
- Outfielder
- Born: January 9, 1964 (age 62); San Francisco de Macorís, Dominican Republic
- Batted: Switch Threw: Right

MLB debut
- April 15, 1984, for the New York Yankees

Last MLB appearance
- October 22, 2001, for the Seattle Mariners

MLB statistics
- Batting average: .269
- Home runs: 57
- Runs batted in: 503
- Stats at Baseball Reference

Teams
- New York Yankees (1984); Oakland Athletics (1986–1990); Los Angeles Dodgers (1990–1992); Philadelphia Phillies (1992); California Angels (1993); Oakland Athletics (1994–1995); San Francisco Giants (1996–1999); Houston Astros (1999); Seattle Mariners (2000–2001)

Career highlights and awards
- World Series champion (1989)

Stanley Julián Antonio Javier [hah-ve-ERR] (born January 9, 1964) is a Dominican former professional baseball outfielder, who played in Major League Baseball (MLB) from 1984 to 2001. A switch-hitter with good production from both sides of the plate, he also had a strong arm with the ability to play all three outfield positions exceptionally well. Javier is the son of former major league player Julián Javier, and was named after his father's teammate and close friend, Stan Musial.

== Early years ==
Javier signed with his father's former franchise, the St. Louis Cardinals, as an amateur free agent at seventeen years old. After two years in the Appalachian League, in which he batted .264 with eleven home runs and 55 runs batted in, Javier was dealt to the New York Yankees with Bobby Meacham (who was also a minor leaguer at the time) for three minor leaguers who never materialized. After two more seasons in the Yankees' farm system, Javier made his major league debut in April of 1984. He had one hit in seven plate appearances that month before returning to the minor leagues. After the season, he was packaged with Tim Birtsas, Jay Howell, Eric Plunk and José Rijo to the Oakland Athletics for Rickey Henderson.

== Oakland A's ==
Javier spent his first season in the Oakland Athletics' organization with the Huntsville Stars, with whom he won the Southern League baseball championship. He made his Oakland A's debut in May 1986, prior to that playing with the Tacoma Tigers, the Oakland A's Triple-A Pacific Coast League affiliate. Javier remained with the club as a fourth outfielder through the 1988 season, in which the A's captured the American League West crown. Javier batted .500 in his first post season, going two-for-four in both the 1988 American League Championship Series with the Boston Red Sox and World Series with the Los Angeles Dodgers.

In 1989, Javier saw quite a bit of playing time in right field when Jose Canseco was kept out of the line-up for the first half of the season by an injured left wrist. Javier played well enough to keep his team within 1.5 games of the first place California Angels in their star slugger's absence, and they stormed to their second straight division crown upon his return. Though Javier logged just two plate appearances in his second post season without getting a hit, Oakland's sweep of the San Francisco Giants in the 1989 World Series made Javier and his father just the third father and son combo to each win a World Series (Julián won with the St. Louis Cardinals in 1964 & 1967).

Following the World Series, A's second baseman Tony Phillips signed as a free agent with the Detroit Tigers. He was replaced by a platoon of Mike Gallego and Lance Blankenship, but the two managed just a .144 batting average, one home run and ten RBIs through the middle of May. In need of an upgrade at second, the A's traded Javier to the Los Angeles Dodgers on May 13, 1990, for Willie Randolph.

== Los Angeles Dodgers ==
With Kirk Gibson out due to surgery on his torn left hamstring, Javier was immediately inserted into the starting line-up in center field. Upon Gibson's return, Javier settled into a pinch hitter and fourth outfielder role, and immediately became one of the hottest bats in the Dodgers' line-up. Over the remainder of the season, Javier batted .316 with seventeen runs batted in. Most of those RBIs seemed to come in clutch situations, as they did against the Chicago Cubs, Atlanta Braves, Montreal Expos and Philadelphia Phillies.

In Spring training 1991, the Dodgers experimented with Javier at third base, but the idea was abandoned by the time the season started. His numbers fell off in 1991, as he batted just .205 with one home run and eleven RBIs, but he still had a knack for big hits. On September 29, his pinch hit single in the ninth inning ignited a come-from-behind victory over the San Francisco Giants.

== Philadelphia Phillies ==
With their record standing at 31–42 just before the midpoint of the 1992 season, the Dodgers went into rebuilding mode. On July 2, Javier was traded to the Philadelphia Phillies for minor league pitcher Steve Searcy and a player to be named later. As the Phillies were in Los Angeles facing the Dodgers when the trade was made, Javier merely changed clubhouses, and found himself a uniform. He went three-for-four with a walk and RBI against his former team the day the trade was made.

Javier saw more regular action with the Phillies than he had ever seen with any team in his career, as he played in all 74 games that remained on the Phillies' 1992 schedule. After the season, he signed a one-year deal with the California Angels.

== California Angels ==
Javier got off to a slow start with his new franchise, as he batted just .220 with no home runs and nine RBIs through the All-Star break. He performed far better in the second half of the 1993 season. Batting lead-off, and playing left field against the Chicago White Sox on August 6, Javier enjoyed a career game, going four-for-four with a walk, two RBIs and a run scored. He hit his first home run since May 22, 1992, on September 9 against the Detroit Tigers' Bill Gullickson, and hit two more in the final month of the season. He also batted .387 in the final month of the season to raise his season average to .291.

== Return to Oakland ==
During the off season, Javier signed a two-year deal with the Oakland A's to be their starting center fielder. Despite the fact that the 1994 season was cut short by a players strike, Javier hit a career high ten home runs that season. He followed that up with career highs in RBIs (56), runs (81) and stolen bases (36) in 1995. The 36 stolen bases included a run of 28 consecutive without being caught.

== San Francisco Giants ==
His performance with Oakland earned Javier his first contract worth over a million dollars annually, as he signed a two-year pact worth $2.1 million on December 8, 1995, to replace Deion Sanders in center field for the San Francisco Giants. A right hamstring strain limited Javier during the first month of his first season in San Francisco, and ended it on July 16. At the time of his injury, he was rumored to be headed to the Baltimore Orioles in a deal for Bobby Bonilla.

The beginning of the 1997 season was interrupted by two trips to the Dominican Republic to be with his mother, who was dying of stomach cancer. He formed a platoon with Darryl Hamilton in center field, and shifted into right field for interleague games in American League ballparks when the designated hitter rule was in play. On June 12, in the first regular season interleague game in the history of Major League Baseball, Javier led off the third inning with baseball's first interleague home run against the Texas Rangers' Darren Oliver. He also hit a game winning double in the seventh to carry his team to a 4–3 victory in this historic game. After narrowly avoiding a hundred losses, and finishing in last place in the National League West in 1996, the Giants won their division in 1997. They were swept in three games by the Florida Marlins in the 1997 National League Division Series. Javier had five hits in twelve at-bats with one RBI and two runs scored.

With Glenallen Hill's departure via free agency after the season, Javier moved to right field for the 1998 season. His season got started on the right foot when he hit a three-run double in the thirteenth inning of the season opener to secure the Giant's 9–4 victory over the Houston Astros. Two days later, he enjoyed the first five RBI game of his career in the rubber game of the series with Houston. The Giants put together a six-game winning streak in September to suddenly become contenders in the National League's wild card race after trailing the Chicago Cubs by five games at the start of the month. Javier provided the heroics in the sixth game of the streak with a two home run game against the Colorado Rockies (he hit just four all season). They ended the season tied with 89 wins apiece to force a one-game playoff at Wrigley Field. With the Giants trailing, 5–0, heading into the ninth inning, Javier drove in the Giants' first run of the game, and scored three batters later. The Giants, however, fell short, and were eliminated.

== Houston Astros ==
The Houston Astros were decimated by injuries, but still holding on to a slim 1.5 game lead in the National League Central division when they acquired Javier from the Giants for pitching prospect Joe Messman just before the waiver deadline of August 31, 1999. Inserted into the number two slot in manager Larry Dierker's batting order, Javier batted .328, and scored twelve runs in just twenty games to help guide the Astros into the post season. After the season, he signed as a free agent with the Seattle Mariners.

== Seattle Mariners ==
Javier got off to a hot start with the Mariners, as he ended the month of April with a .343 batting average and sixteen runs scored. It was, however, his glove that provided the highlight of his stay in Seattle. He made a circus catch on June 4, 2000, to rob the San Diego Padres' Phil Nevin of a home run.

Having already announced that he would retire at the end of the season, Javier platooned with Al Martin in left field for a Mariners team that went on to win 116 games in 2001. He made a leaping catch to rob the New York Yankees' Alfonso Soriano of a home run in the third game of the 2001 American League Championship Series to ignite his team's come from behind victory. He also hit the only post season home run of his career against Mike Mussina in game two.

== Career stats ==
Games	PA	AB	Runs	Hits	2B	3B	HR	RBI	SB	BB	SO	Avg.	OBP	TB	Fld%
1763	5755	5047	781	1358	225	40	57	503	246	578	839	.269	.345	1834	.987

Having made the post season six times in his career, Javier batted .253 in the post season, with eight RBIs. He finished tenth in the AL in stolen bases in 1994, with 24, and seventh in the AL in steals in 1995, with 36.

While playing Winter ball in the Dominican Professional Baseball League, Javier won two batting titles back to back years and was named the all-time center fielder for the Aguilas Cibaenas. His father was named the all time second baseman for the team. Javier was inducted into the Hispanic Heritage Baseball Museum Hall of Fame in 2011.

He was named the general manager of the Dominican Republic national baseball team in the first World Baseball Classic in 2006, and named again the general manager for the 2009 series. He currently works for the Major League Baseball Players Association.

== See also ==
- List of players from Dominican Republic in Major League Baseball
- List of second-generation Major League Baseball players
