= Larry Arndt =

American baseball player (1963-2014)

Lary Arndt
- First baseman / Third baseman
- Born: February 25, 1963; Fremont, Ohio, U.S.
- Died: January 3, 2014 (aged 50); Toledo, Ohio, U.S.
- Batted: Right Threw: Right

MLB debut
- June 6, 1989, for the Oakland Athletics

Last MLB appearance
- June 7, 1989, for the Oakland Athletics

MLB statistics
- Games: 2
- At-bats: 6
- Runs: 1
- Hits: 1
- Batting average: .167
- Stats at Baseball Reference

Teams
- Oakland Athletics (1989)

Larry Wayne Arndt (February 25, 1963 – January 3, 2014) was an American infielder in Major League Baseball who played for the Oakland Athletics during its 1989 season. Listed at 6' 1", 195 lb., Arndt batted and threw right handed.

Born in Fremont, Ohio, Arndt attended Bowling Green State University, where he enjoyed a successful collegiate career. Arndt left school in 1985 as the team's career leader in runs batted in with 162, winning first-team All-conference honors in 1984 and second-team in 1985.

Arndt was selected by the Athletics in the 26th round of the 1985 MLB draft. He spent four seasons in the Minor Leagues before joining the big team in June 1989, going 1-for-6 with a run scored in two games. He played his last season with the Triple-A Tacoma Tigers in 1990.

In between, Arndt played winter ball with the Navegantes del Magallanes club of the Venezuelan League in the 1989-90 season.

In 1995, he was inducted into the Bowling Green State University Hall of Fame.

Arndt was a long time resident of Toledo, Ohio, where he died in 2014 at the age of 50.
