= Storm Davis =

American baseball player (born 1961)

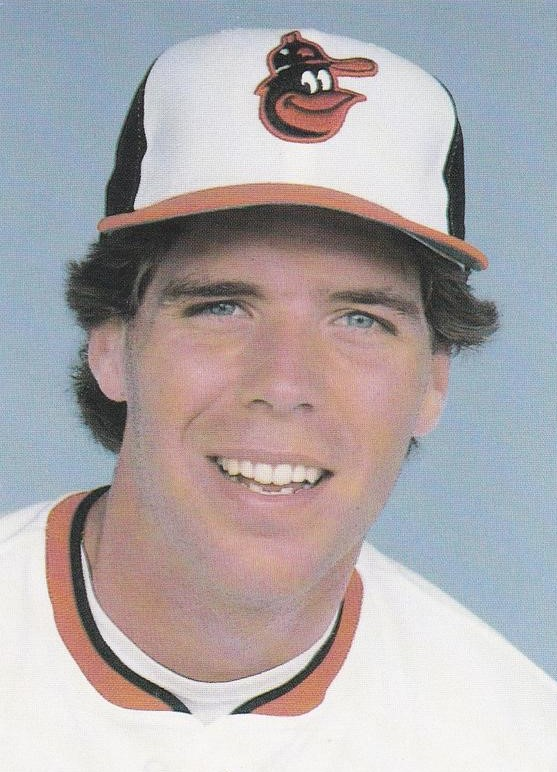
- Pitcher
- Born: December 26, 1961 (age 64); Dallas, Texas, U.S.
- Batted: Right Threw: Right

MLB debut
- April 29, 1982, for the Baltimore Orioles

Last MLB appearance
- August 11, 1994, for the Detroit Tigers

MLB statistics
- Win–loss record: 113–96
- Earned run average: 4.02
- Strikeouts: 1,048
- Stats at Baseball Reference

Teams
- Baltimore Orioles (1982–1986); San Diego Padres (1987); Oakland Athletics (1987–1989); Kansas City Royals (1990–1991); Baltimore Orioles (1992); Oakland Athletics (1993); Detroit Tigers (1993–1994)

Career highlights and awards
- 2× World Series champion (1983, 1989)

George Earl "Storm" Davis (born December 26, 1961) is an American former professional baseball player who pitched in the major leagues from 1982 to 1994. He is a two-time World Series champion.

== World Series experience ==
Davis was the winning pitcher for the Baltimore Orioles in Game Four of the 1983 World Series versus the Philadelphia Phillies. He was the losing pitcher for the Oakland Athletics in Games Two and Five of the 1988 World Series versus the Los Angeles Dodgers.

In 1989, he won a career-high 19 games for the A's during a season which the A's won 99 games, more than any other team in Major League Baseball. After Davis (and reliever Rick Honeycutt) pitched in the only AL Championship Series game that the A's lost that year, Davis was originally scheduled to be the A's starting pitcher for Game Four of the 1989 World Series. When the Loma Prieta earthquake caused Game 3 to be delayed by ten days, Tony La Russa decided to re-use the winners of Games 1 and 2, Dave Stewart and Mike Moore, as the starting pitchers of Games 3 and 4; La Russa also penciled in Davis as the starting pitcher for Game 6, if necessary. La Russa's strategy worked: both Stewart and Moore won their games, and Davis, publicly angry at La Russa for the change, became a free agent at the end of the season.

== 1989-1991 ==
Years later, Dave Stewart described Davis as the "best fifth starter [Stewart] had ever [seen]....[Davis] pitched 165-170 innings (actually 169), won 19 games (19-7) and spent some time doing a pretty good job out of the bullpen, too. Storm was the perfect fifth starter." Stewart's high opinion of Davis' 1989 season is not shared by sabermetrician Bill James, who cites Davis' 19-7 winning record as a canonical example of how a pitcher's win-loss record can be misleading.

After the 1989 season, the Kansas City Royals signed Davis to a three-year, $6 million contract; this turned out to be a major blunder. Davis had an ERA that was worse than the league average in 1989, but Royals pitching coach Frank Funk said, "We don't want pitchers with good ERA's. We want pitchers with wins." In his two seasons in Kansas City, Davis had a win–loss record of 10–19. He pitched mostly in relief in 1991 before being traded to the Baltimore Orioles.

== Later career ==
Starting with the 1991 season, Davis made the majority of his appearances as a relief pitcher out of the bullpen. Following the 1991 season, he was traded by the Royals to the Baltimore Orioles for backup catcher Bob Melvin. During his second stint in Baltimore, Davis teamed with relievers Todd Frohwirth, Alan Mills, and closer Gregg Olson to form one of the better bullpens in the American League.

On December 8, 1992, Davis signed a 2-year, $2 million contract with the Oakland Athletics, reuniting with A's manager Tony LaRussa and pitching coach Dave Duncan. The deal did not work out for either side, with the 1993 Athletics posting their worst record in 10 seasons, ultimately finishing last in the division. Davis was released mid-season on July 9, after posting a 2–6 record with a 6.18 ERA in 19 appearances over 62 innings, including 8 games started. On July 23, Davis signed with the Detroit Tigers, a team that was leading the AL in runs scored, but had the second-highest ERA. Pitching exclusively out of the bullpen, Davis posted a 3.06 ERA over 35.1 innings, with 4 saves. Davis returned to the Tigers in 1994. Again pitching exclusively as a reliever, he posted a 3.56 ERA over 48 innings.

In 1995, Davis appeared in 4 games for the AAA Indianapolis Indians, at the time the top minor league affiliate of the Cincinnati Reds.

== Pitching style ==
Jim Palmer remembered that Davis was very coachable. "The thing about Storm was you could practically program him, tell him what to throw and he'd just throw it."

== Coaching ==
Davis formerly served as pitching coach for the Jacksonville Jumbo Shrimp, a Class AA farm team for the Miami Marlins. He is currently coaching at Trinity Christian Academy in Jacksonville.

== Personal life ==
According to his 1987 Topps baseball card, Davis' nickname derived from a character in a book his mother read while pregnant. Another story traces his nickname to similarities with Palmer, the Orioles' Cy Young Award-winning pitcher; he was a "cyclone" or "storm." However, some state Storm was his nickname as early as age 6 or 7.

Storm Davis' parents are the adoptive parents of Glenn Davis, also a former major league player.

Davis worked as head baseball coach at The Bolles School for the 2008 and 2009 seasons after spending the previous two seasons as an assistant on the Bolles baseball staff. He resigned to become pitching coach at Low-A Hickory team in the Texas Rangers organization.

Davis' son Zachary played football for the Liberty University Flames. He is currently the head football coach for the class AAA Buckhannon-Upshur High School Buccaneers in Buckhannon, West Virginia.
