= Bill Bathe =

American baseball player (born 1960)

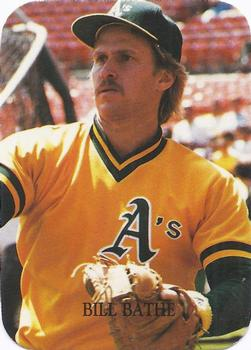
- Catcher
- Born: October 14, 1960 (age 65); Downey, California, U.S.
- Batted: Right Threw: Right

Professional debut
- MLB: April 12, 1986, for the Oakland Athletics
- NPB: April 6, 1991, for the Nippon Ham Fighters

Last appearance
- MLB: October 3, 1990, for the San Francisco Giants
- NPB: August 29, 1992, for the Nippon Ham Fighters

MLB statistics
- Batting average: .213
- Home runs: 8
- Runs batted in: 29

NPB statistics
- Batting average: .236
- Home runs: 16
- Runs batted in: 52
- Stats at Baseball Reference

Teams
- Oakland Athletics (1986); San Francisco Giants (1989–1990); Nippon Ham Fighters (1991–1992)

William David Bathe [bayth] (born October 14, 1960) is an American former professional baseball catcher. He played in Major League Baseball (MLB) for the Oakland Athletics in 1986 and for the San Francisco Giants from 1989–1990.

In his MLB career, Bathe had eight home runs, 29 runs batted in, and had a career batting average of .213. He played for the Giants when they reached the 1989 World Series against Oakland. He also played for the Nippon Ham Fighters in 1991 and 1992.

Bathe was the 5th player in the National League to hit a home run in his first World Series at-bat. He is now a captain for the Tucson Fire Department and a paramedic.
