= Gene Nelson (baseball) =

American baseball player (born 1960)

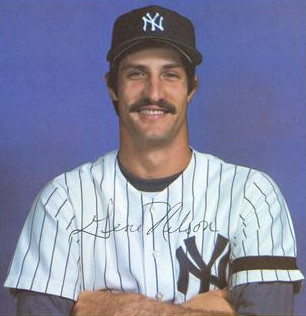
- Nelson in 1981
- Pitcher
- Born: December 3, 1960 (age 65); Tampa, Florida, U.S.
- Batted: Right Threw: Right

MLB debut
- May 4, 1981, for the New York Yankees

Last MLB appearance
- September 29, 1993, for the Texas Rangers

MLB statistics
- Win–loss record: 53–64
- Earned run average: 4.13
- Strikeouts: 655
- Stats at Baseball Reference

Teams
- New York Yankees (1981); Seattle Mariners (1982–1983); Chicago White Sox (1984–1986); Oakland Athletics (1987–1992); California Angels (1993); Texas Rangers (1993)

Career highlights and awards
- World Series champion (1989)

Wayland Eugene Nelson II (born December 3, 1960) is an American former professional baseball player who pitched in Major League Baseball (MLB) from 1981 to 1993. He was a setup man for the Oakland Athletics team that won the 1989 World Series and three American League pennants.

== Playing career ==
Nelson graduated from Pasco High School in Dade City, Florida in 1978. The Texas Rangers selected him in the 30th round of the 1978 MLB draft. Texas traded him to the New York Yankees in October 1979 as one of the players to be named later in a trade that July that sent Oscar Gamble to the Yankees for Mickey Rivers. Nelson was the Yankees minor league pitcher of the year in 1980 with the Fort Lauderdale Yankees, with a 20–3 win–loss record and 1.97 ERA.

Nelson made his MLB debut with the Yankees in May 1981, pitching in 8 eight games for New York. He was the second-youngest player in the AL that year. In April 1982, the Yankees traded Nelson, Bill Caudill, and a player to be named later to the Seattle Mariners for Shane Rawley. He was named the AL Player of the Week in June 1982 after throwing a shutout against the Rangers and beating the Kansas City Royals. Nelson spent most of the 1983 season in the minors, and Seattle traded him and Jerry Don Gleaton to the Chicago White Sox in June 1984 for Salomé Barojas. Nelson pitched a career-high 145 2/3 innings in 1985, starting 18 games and finishing 11, with a 10–10 record. Chicago traded Nelson and a player to be named later to the Oakland Athletics after the 1986 season for Donnie Hill.

Nelson had a rough first month with Oakland, with a 7.11 ERA in 8 games, then settled into a key relief role for manager Tony La Russa, helping the A's win three AL pennants winning seasons from 1988 to 1990, frequently setting up Dennis Eckersley for his saves. Nelson had a 1.57 ERA in 1990 and a 9–6 record in 1988.He missed more than one month in 1991 with a fractured little finger after he was hit by a foul ball in the dugout. After seeing his performance slip in, Oakland released him in August 1992. He finished his career in 1993 with a 3.12 ERA while pitching for the California Angels and Texas .

== Personal life ==
Nelson is married and has three children.
