= Todd Burns =

American baseball player (born 1963)

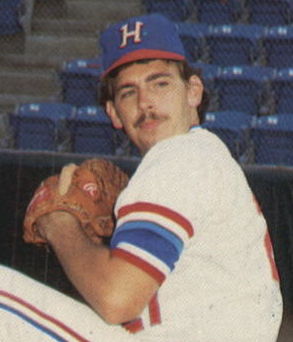
- Burns with the Huntsville Stars c. 1986
- Pitcher
- Born: July 6, 1963 (age 62); Maywood, California, U.S.
- Batted: Right Threw: Right

MLB debut
- May 31, 1988, for the Oakland Athletics

Last MLB appearance
- September 17, 1993, for the St. Louis Cardinals

MLB statistics
- Win–loss record: 21–23
- Earned run average: 3.47
- Strikeouts: 252
- Stats at Baseball Reference

Teams
- Oakland Athletics (1988–1991); Texas Rangers (1992–1993); St. Louis Cardinals (1993)

Career highlights and awards
- World Series champion (1989)
Medals
Baseball
Representing the United States
Pan American Games
Bronze medal – third place	1983 Caracas	Team
World Junior Baseball Championship
Silver medal – second place	1981 Newark	Team

Todd Edward Burns (born July 6, 1963) is an American former professional baseball player. He played in Major League Baseball (MLB) as a right-handed pitcher from 1988 to 1993, most notably as a member of the Oakland Athletics team that won three consecutive American League pennants and a World Series championship in 1989. He also played for the Texas Rangers and the St. Louis Cardinals.

== Baseball career ==
Burns was born in Maywood, California. He attended Oral Roberts University in Tulsa, Oklahoma, earning first-team All-America honors before being drafted by the Oakland Athletics in the 7th round of the 1984 MLB draft. He played for the A's from 1988 to 1991, and would also play for the Texas Rangers (1992–1993), and St. Louis Cardinals (1993). He was nicknamed "the Mad Hatter" because of his habit of frantically tugging at the bill of his cap and re-adjusting it prior to every pitch as well as "Third Degree" for his penchant of giving up runs near the end of his career.

Burns made his MLB debut on May 31, 1988, and during that season was a reliably effective starter at the back end of the A's rotation. He compiled an 8–2 record over 14 starts and three relief appearances as the A's won the AL pennant but then lost the World Series to the Los Angeles Dodgers. Burns switched to an almost exclusively relief role in following seasons. He helped the A's win two more pennants in 1989 and 1990, and a World Series in 1989, when the A's swept their cross-bay rivals, the San Francisco Giants. He left the A's following the 1991 season to sign with the Texas Rangers, then finished his career on September 17, 1993, with the St. Louis Cardinals. Burns posted a regular season won-loss record of 21–23 with a 3.47 earned run average and 13 saves in 203 games pitched. In 3 postseason series, Burns compiled a 0–0 won-loss record with a 7.36 earned run average. Burns pitched well in the 1988 and 1989 playoffs; much of this high ERA came from Game 1 of the 1990 World Series versus the Reds.

Burns now runs the Todd Burns School of Baseball in Huntsville, Alabama.
