= Lance Blankenship =

American baseball player (born 1963)

- Second baseman / Outfielder
- Born: December 6, 1963 (age 62); Portland, Oregon, U.S.
- Batted: Right Threw: Right

MLB debut
- September 4, 1988, for the Oakland Athletics

Last MLB appearance
- August 15, 1993, for the Oakland Athletics

MLB statistics
- Batting average: .222
- Home runs: 9
- Runs batted in: 92
- Stolen bases: 54
- Stats at Baseball Reference

Teams
- Oakland Athletics (1988–1993)

Career highlights and awards
- World Series champion (1989)

Lance Robert Blankenship (born December 6, 1963) is an American former Major League Baseball utility player.

Blankenship played his entire career with the Oakland Athletics (1988–1993) after the A's drafted him in the 10th round of the 1986 MLB amateur draft. He made his Major League Baseball debut on September 4, 1988, and played his final game on August 15, 1993. His career concluded with a regular season .222 batting average, nine home runs, 92 runs batted in, and 54 stolen bases.

Blankenship played for the Athletics in two World Series. He was a member of the A's team that swept the San Francisco Giants in the 1989 World Series and the A's team that lost to the Cincinnati Reds in the 1990 World Series. In five postseason series, Blankenship tallied a career postseason .250 batting average with four runs scored and two stolen bases.

Blankenship's playing career was derailed by a rotator cuff injury which prevented his return to the Major Leagues. In 1995, he bought a tropical fish and aquarium store in San Ramon, California and, by 1998, he was managing it full-time.
