= Dave Henderson =

American baseball player (1958–2015)

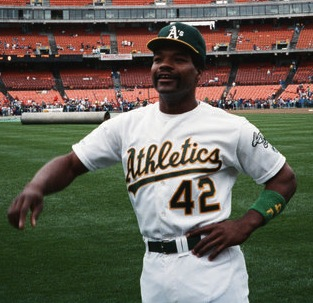
- Henderson with the Oakland A's in 1989
- Center fielder
- Born: July 21, 1958; Merced, California, U.S.
- Died: December 27, 2015 (aged 57); Seattle, Washington, U.S.
- Batted: Right Threw: Right

MLB debut
- April 9, 1981, for the Seattle Mariners

Last MLB appearance
- July 29, 1994, for the Kansas City Royals

MLB statistics
- Batting average: .258
- Home runs: 197
- Runs batted in: 708
- Stats at Baseball Reference

Teams
- Seattle Mariners (1981–1986); Boston Red Sox (1986–1987); San Francisco Giants (1987); Oakland Athletics (1988–1993); Kansas City Royals (1994)

Career highlights and awards
- All-Star (1991); World Series champion (1989); Athletics Hall of Fame

David Lee Henderson (July 21, 1958 – December 27, 2015), nicknamed "Hendu", was an American professional baseball player. He played in Major League Baseball (MLB) for the Seattle Mariners, Boston Red Sox, San Francisco Giants, Oakland Athletics, and Kansas City Royals during his 14-year career, primarily as an outfielder.

Henderson is best remembered for the two-out, two-strike home run he hit in the top of the ninth inning in Game 5 of the 1986 American League Championship Series. He helped his teams reach the World Series four times during his career—Boston in 1986 and Oakland from 1988 to 1990, with Oakland winning the championship in 1989.

Henderson lived in the Seattle area after his playing career, working as a Mariners broadcaster. He died of a heart attack in 2015.

== Early life and amateur career ==
Henderson was born in Merced, California and grew up in nearby Dos Palos, where he attended high school and played both baseball and football. With the football team, which won championships in 1975 and 1976, he played tight end, running back, and strong safety. One of his baseball teammates was Stan Holmes, who later won the College World Series Most Outstanding Player Award. Dos Palos won championships in 1976 and 1977. Henderson's uniform numbers—42 in football, 22 in baseball—were both retired by the Dos Palos Broncos, which inducted him into the school's Hall of Fame in 2012 and named their baseball field in his honor.

== Professional career ==
=== Seattle Mariners ===
Henderson was selected by the Seattle Mariners in the first round of the 1977 Major League Baseball draft. He signed for a $100,000 signing bonus, equivalent to $531,000 in 2025. His first professional season was 1977 with the Bellingham Mariners of the Class A Short Season Northwest League, where he played in 65 games, batting .315 with 16 home runs and 63 runs batted in (RBIs).

Henderson's next two seasons were spent in the Class A California League. In 1978, he was with the Stockton Mariners, batting .232 with 7 home runs and 63 RBIs in 117 games. He also dealt with an Achilles tendon injury. In 1979, with the San Jose Missions, he was an All-Star, batting .300 with 27 home runs and 99 RBIs in 136 games. In 1980, Henderson moved up to Triple-A, playing with the Spokane Indians of the Pacific Coast League, where he played in 109 games, batting .279 with 7 home runs and 50 RBIs.

Henderson was named the Mariners' Opening Day center fielder in 1981, batting 0-for-4. His first MLB hit came several games into the season—a home run against Oakland pitcher Steve McCatty, after Henderson had been hitless in his first nine major league plate appearances. He struggled at the plate throughout the season; at the end of April, he was batting .135, which improved slightly to .172 at the end of May. After then going 1-for-10 at the start of June, he was sent back down to Spokane.

Henderson spent much of the summer with Spokane, appearing in 80 games while batting .279 with 12 home runs and 50 RBIs. In early September, he was recalled, with his first appearance back with the Mariners coming on September 3, in a 20-inning game against the Red Sox—one of the longest MLB games ever played. From when he was recalled until the end of the season, he appeared mostly as a late-innings defensive replacement, finishing his first MLB year with a .167 average in 59 games played, with 6 home runs at 13 RBIs.

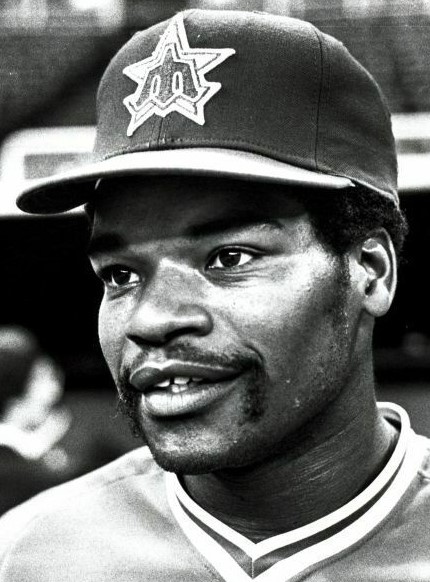
Henderson with the Seattle Mariners c. 1981

During the 1982 season, Henderson's playing time increased significantly, as he appeared in 104 games, with 85 complete games played (all in center field). He batted .253, with 14 home runs and 48 RBIs. In 1983, his batting average improved to .269 with 17 home runs and 55 RBIs, while appearing in 137 games, with 124 of them being complete games in the outfield (78 in center field and 46 in right field). Henderson spent some of the 1984 season on the disabled list because of a hamstring injury. Still, he hit well, batting .280 with 14 home runs and 43 RBIs in 112 games played with 78 complete games in the outfield (all but 9 in center). His batting average dropped somewhat in 1985, as he hit .241 with 14 home runs and 68 RBIs, while appearing in 139 games with 117 of them being complete games in the outfield (all but 12 in center).

Henderson struck out three times facing Boston Red Sox ace Roger Clemens on April 29, 1986, as Clemens set an MLB record with 20 strikeouts in a nine-inning game. Henderson struggled at the plate early in the season, batting below .200 on May 25. By June 19, he had improved to .263, and he was batting .276 on August 17.

Overall, Henderson played with Seattle for parts of six seasons, appearing in a total of 654 games, while batting .257 with 79 home runs and 271 RBIs. He was the franchise leader in home runs over the team's first 10 seasons.

=== Boston Red Sox ===
On August 19, 1986, the Red Sox, atop the American League (AL) East, traded for Henderson and shortstop Spike Owen, sending Rey Quiñones, Mike Brown, Mike Trujillo, and a player to be named later to Seattle. Henderson was acquired as a backup for Boston center fielder Tony Armas.

Henderson joined the 1986 Red Sox on August 19 and appeared in 36 games over the remainder of the regular season, with just 7 complete games (all in center field). Most of his appearances were as a late-game defensive replacement in center field, or as a pinch hitter – he had only 51 at bats, collecting 10 hits (.196 average) with one home run and three RBIs.

The Red Sox finished the season on top of the AL East – 5 1/2 games ahead of the New York Yankees – and faced the winners of the AL West, the California Angels, in the AL Championship Series (ALCS).

==== 1986 ALCS home run ====
Henderson is best remembered for the two-out, two-strike home run he hit in the top of the ninth inning in Game 5 of the 1986 ALCS.

At the time, the Angels were playing at home and were ahead in the series 3 games to 1 over the Red Sox. Henderson had appeared in Game 2 and Game 4 as a late-innings defensive replacement for Tony Armas, and was hitless in one at bat. In Game 5, Armas sprained his ankle in the second inning, and was replaced by Henderson, who entered the game to play center field in the bottom of the fifth inning. With the Red Sox leading 2–1 in the sixth inning, the Angels had a man on second with two out, when Bobby Grich hit a deep fly ball Henderson attempted to catch on the warning track – the ball deflected off his glove and went over the wall, giving Grich a two-run home run. The Angels now had a 3–2 lead, with Henderson the likely scapegoat should the Red Sox lose the game. Henderson batted in the seventh inning and struck out, while the Angels added two more runs in the bottom of the seventh.

The Angels had a 5–2 lead going into the ninth inning and were three outs away from their first-ever trip to the World Series, but the Red Sox closed the gap to 5–4 on a two-run home run by Don Baylor. When Henderson batted against reliever Donnie Moore, there were two outs and catcher Rich Gedman was on first after being hit by a pitch. After falling behind in the count 1–2 – the Angels now one strike away from advancing – Henderson took a ball to even the count at 2–2, and fouled off the next two pitches. Then, on Moore's seventh pitch of the at bat, Henderson hit a drive to left that cleared the outfield wall, stunning the Angels and all of Anaheim Stadium. Henderson's blast prompted television broadcast announcer Al Michaels to state, "You’re looking at one for the ages here.” The Sporting News ranked the home run as the 24th greatest baseball moment in 1999.

The Angels tied the game 6–6 in the bottom of the ninth, and the game went into extra innings. In the top of the 11th, the Red Sox loaded the bases with no outs, and Henderson hit a sacrifice fly to score Baylor, which put the Red Sox ahead 7–6 and proved to be the margin of victory. Still down 3 games to 2 in the series, the Red Sox returned home to Fenway Park for the final two games, where they defeated the Angels 10–4 and 8–1 to capture the AL pennant. Henderson played center field for both of those games – collecting a walk and a run in each game, but going hitless – as Armas' injury kept him from playing. For the ALCS, Henderson finished 1-for-9 at the plate, with his only hit being the season-saving home run in Game 5.

==== 1986 World Series ====
Henderson was the Red Sox' centerfielder throughout the 1986 World Series, as Tony Armas was sidelined by the injury he had sustained in the ALCS; Armas made only a single appearance, as a pinch hitter. Henderson hit .400 (10-for-25) in a losing cause, as the Red Sox were defeated by the New York Mets in seven games. Henderson hit two home runs – the first during the Red Sox' 9–3 win in Game 2, and the second came in the 10th inning of historic Game 6, giving the Red Sox a 4–3 lead in a game they would go on to lose 6–5.

==== 1987 season ====
Henderson was Boston's starting center fielder for the first month of the 1987 season. During April he hit .239 with three home runs, six RBIs, and 18 strikeouts. On April 30, the Red Sox called up rookie Ellis Burks from the minors to be the regular center fielder. Henderson's playing time decrease as he primarily played corner outfield positions, along with pinch hitting. At the end of May, he was hitting .240, then he struggled during June, dropping to a .206 average. After having only six at bats in July, he received more playing time in August and raised his season totals to a .234 average with 8 home runs and 25 RBIs.

Over parts of two seasons with Boston, Henderson played in 111 regular season games, batting .226 with nine home runs and 28 RBIs.

=== San Francisco Giants ===
On September 1, 1987 the Red Sox traded Henderson to the San Francisco Giants for a player to be named later (ultimately, Randy Kutcher). In the final month of the season, Henderson played 15 games, batting .238. While the Giants won the National League (NL) West and played in the NL Championship Series, Henderson was acquired hours after the postseason roster deadline, thus was not eligible to play for the Giants in the playoffs. After the season, Henderson elected free agency.

=== Oakland Athletics ===
==== 1988 season ====
Henderson signed as a free agent with Oakland before the 1988 season. He was the Athletics' starting center fielder on Opening Day, and appeared in 146 games, including 127 complete games in center field. His performance proved to be one of the season's biggest surprises as he set career highs in batting average (.304), runs (100), hits (154), doubles (38), RBIs (94), and slugging percentage (.525). He also hit 24 home runs, and the Athletics were 23–1 when he homered. He hit a walk-off home run to beat the Yankees on May 30. Henderson received consideration during AL Most Valuable Player Award voting and finished 13th, with the award going to teammate Jose Canseco.

The Athletics finished the season with a 104–58 record, and won the AL West by 13 games over the Minnesota Twins. In the ALCS, the Athletics faced the Red Sox and swept them in four games. Henderson batted 6-for-16 (.375) with one home run and four RBIs during the series. The Athletics advanced to the World Series where they lost to the Los Angeles Dodgers in five games, including their Game 1 loss on Kirk Gibson's famous home run. Henderson batted 6-for-20 (.300) with one RBI. Overall in the 1988 postseason, he batted 12-for-36 (.333) with one home run and five RBIs, and he played center field for all of Oakland's games.

==== 1989 season ====
In 1989, Henderson was again the team's primary center fielder, playing 134 complete games, and appearing in 152 games during the season. His hitting wasn't as good as the prior year, as he batted .250 (down from .304) and had 131 strikeouts (up from 92). He had 15 home runs and 80 RBIs. The Athletics had a 99–63 record to win the AL West again, finishing 7 games ahead of the Kansas City Royals. In the ALCS, the Athletics beat the Toronto Blue Jays in five games. Henderson hit 5-for-19 (.263) with one home run and one RBI during the ALCS.

Oakland faced the San Francisco Giants in the World Series and swept them in four games, although those games were played over a period of two weeks due to the Loma Prieta earthquake before the start of Game 3. Henderson hit 4-for-13 (.308) with two home runs and four RBIs during the series. For the 1989 postseason his batting average was .281 (9-for-32) with three home runs and nine RBIs, and he played center field throughout. This championship proved to be the only one of Henderson's MLB career.

==== 1990 season ====
The 1990 season again found Oakland winning the AL West, this year with a 103–59 record, finishing ahead of the Chicago White Sox by 9 games. Henderson batted .271 with 20 home runs and 63 RBIs, while appearing in 127 games, including 100 complete games in center field. He missed 27 games between August 20 and September 21, due to torn cartilage in his right knee. Oakland met the AL East-winning Red Sox in the ALCS and swept them in four games, as they had done two years prior. Oakland had Willie McGee in center field in the first two games, with Henderson playing the last two games. During those two games, Henderson batted 1-for-6 with one RBI. Oakland was unable to repeat as champions, being swept in four games by the Cincinnati Reds in the World Series. Henderson batted 3-for-13 (.231) without a home run or RBI. Oakland used McGee in center field in Game 1, with Henderson playing the other three games. Overall for the postseason, Henderson hit .211 (4-for-19) with one RBI and without a home run.

==== 1991–1993 ====
During the first half of the 1991 season, Henderson hit well, batting .298 with 18 home runs and 50 RBIs, and was selected for the All-Star Game with over 1.5 million fan votes. He started the All-Star Game for the AL in right field, and was 0-for-2 at the plate before being pinch hit for by Rubén Sierra in the sixth inning. In August, Henderson hit three home runs in one game, in a losing effort against Minnesota, with all three coming in consecutive at bats off starting pitcher David West. Henderson's average dipped in the second half of the season and he finished the year at .276 with 85 RBIs and a career-high 25 home runs. The Athletics finished with an 84–78 record in fourth place in the AL West.

Henderson had problems with a badly strained right hamstring throughout the 1992 season, which limited him to just 20 games and caused him to miss 104 games from May 5 to the start of September. He hit just 9-for-63 (.143) for the season with 2 RBIs. While Oakland won the AL West (then lost to Toronto in six games in the ALCS), Henderson was left off the postseason roster due to his injury.

In 1993, Henderson appeared in 107 games, including 54 complete games in the outfield and 26 starts as designated hitter (DH). He batted .220 with 20 home runs and 53 RBIs. The Athletics finished the season with a 68–94 record, last place in the AL West. After the season ended, Henderson became a free agent.

Overall, Henderson spent six seasons with Oakland, batting .263 with 104 home runs and 377 RBIs. His time with Oakland included the only All-Star Game and the only World Series championship of his career.

=== Kansas City Royals ===
Before the start of the 1994 season, Henderson signed as a free agent with the Kansas City Royals, as the club intended to platoon him with Bob Hamelin. For the first month of the season, Henderson was the Royals' regular right fielder, however he only hit 9-for-47 (.191) with 2 home runs and 8 RBIs. Over the coming months, he appeared more as DH and was not an everyday player. Through late July, he was hitting .247 with 5 home runs at 31 RBIs, having appeared in only 56 of the team's 103 games. Shortly after his 36th birthday, Henderson retired on July 29, which was his last MLB appearance – against the Twins, he played the final two innings of the game as a defensive replacement in left field.

During his 14 MLB seasons, Henderson appeared in 1,538 games, batting .258 with 197 home runs and 708 RBIs. Defensively, he played 1,388 games in the outfield (1,157 in center field), with a .984 fielding percentage.

== Personal life ==
Henderson was married twice and had two sons, one of whom is affected by Angelman syndrome, which Henderson worked to raise research funding for. Henderson's son, Trent, was selected by the Houston Astros in the 30th round of the 2006 MLB draft but did not sign professionally and attended Skagit Valley College.

After retiring as a player, Henderson lived in the Seattle area and remained involved in baseball as an agent, broadcaster, and running fantasy camps. He also co-founded a charity with Mariners' broadcaster Rick Rizzs that provides Christmas gifts to children. Henderson owned and operated Dave Henderson's Ball Yard in Bellevue, Washington, during the 1990s.

Henderson's uncle, Joe Henderson, pitched in 16 MLB games from 1974 to 1977.

Henderson was inducted into the Fresno Athletic Hall of Fame in 2014. He was inducted into the Athletics Hall of Fame in 2026.

=== Broadcasting ===
From 1997 to 2006, Henderson worked as a color commentator during Mariners radio and television broadcasts. He returned to the Mariners' radio booth during 2011 and 2012 as one of a rotating crew of part-time announcers who succeeded the deceased Dave Niehaus, working alongside Rizzs.

=== Death ===
Henderson suffered a heart attack and died at Harborview Medical Center in Seattle on December 27, 2015, approximately two months after having undergone a kidney transplant.
