= Terry Steinbach =

American baseball player

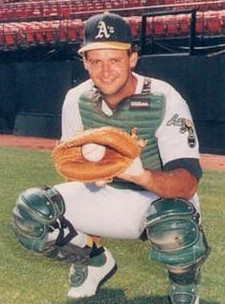
- Catcher
- Born: March 2, 1962 (age 64); New Ulm, Minnesota, U.S.
- Batted: Right Threw: Right

MLB debut
- September 12, 1986, for the Oakland Athletics

Last MLB appearance
- October 1, 1999, for the Minnesota Twins

MLB statistics
- Batting average: .271
- Home runs: 162
- Runs batted in: 745
- Stats at Baseball Reference

Teams
- Oakland Athletics (1986–1996); Minnesota Twins (1997–1999)

Career highlights and awards
- 3× All-Star (1988, 1989, 1993); World Series champion (1989); Athletics Hall of Fame

Terry Lee Steinbach (born March 2, 1962) is an American former professional baseball player and coach. He played in Major League Baseball (MLB) as a catcher from 1986 to 1999, most notably as a member of the Oakland Athletics team that won three consecutive American League pennants and a World Series championship in 1989. He played his final three seasons with the Minnesota Twins. A three-time All-Star player, Steinbach won the 1988 All-Star Game MVP Award and caught two no-hitters during his career. In 2024, he was inducted into the Athletics Hall of Fame.

== Amateur career ==
Steinbach attended New Ulm High School in New Ulm, Minnesota. The Cleveland Indians selected Steinbach in the 16th round of the 1980 Major League Baseball draft, but Steinbach chose not to sign. He enrolled at the University of Minnesota, and played for the Minnesota Golden Gophers' college baseball team. With the Golden Gophers, Steinbach played as a third baseman. In 1982, he played collegiate summer baseball with the Cotuit Kettleers of the Cape Cod Baseball League (CCBL), where he led the league in batting average with a .431 mark; in 2001 he was inducted into the CCBL Hall of Fame. In 1983, he was named the Big Ten Conference Co-Player of the Year, with Rich Stoll of the University of Michigan.

== Professional career ==
The Oakland Athletics selected Steinbach in the ninth round of the 1983 Major League Baseball draft. Steinbach signed with the Athletics, and made his professional debut in the minor leagues. After two years as a third baseman, the Athletics moved Steinbach to catcher, and played him for two years in Class AA of the minor leagues.

Steinbach made his major league debut on September 12, 1986, against the Cleveland Indians. He hit a home run off of Greg Swindell in his first major league at-bat. During his 1987 rookie year he had a .284/.349/.463 line with 16 home runs, 56 RBIs and 16 doubles. He also caught 37 would-be base stealers, 3rd highest in the American League.

He was elected to the All Star Game in 1988. His selection was controversial because Steinbach had posted modest numbers in the first half of the season. However, during the game he accounted for both AL runs with a home run and sacrifice fly, and was named the game's MVP. The same year he hit .364 with a double in the World Series against the Los Angeles Dodgers. In all, Steinbach played for four division championship teams from 1988 to 1992, which won three American League pennants and the 1989 World Series. In the 1989 series, he went 4-for-18 but drove in seven runs to go with a home run in the four-game sweep by Oakland. For his career, he hit .281 with two home runs and fourteen RBIs in 25 postseason games. Offensively, his best year was 1996, when he hit 35 home runs with 100 RBIs, 25 doubles for a .272/.342/.529 slash line, and he finished 21st in the AL MVP ballot. He occasionally played first base, third base and both left and right field. After playing for the Athletics for eleven seasons, he went on to play for his home-state Minnesota Twins for the 1997 season. At ages 35 to 37, he averaged 15 home runs, 71 RBIs and 23 doubles per every 162 games as the Twins starting catcher. He also caught two no-hitters during his career (Dave Stewart in 1990, Eric Milton in 1999). He was a free agent after the 1999 season and had offers to play in the fall of 2000 for either St. Louis or the US Olympic team but suffered a torn hamstring in a waterskiing accident. He never played professional baseball again.

On August 17, 2024, Steinbach was inducted into the Athletics Hall of Fame.

== Coaching ==
From 2008 to 2012, Steinbach was a coach for the Wayzata High School boys varsity baseball team in Plymouth, Minnesota. Steinbach's son Lucas played with the team during this time before graduating in June 2012. He also worked as the Twins' minor league instructor for thirteen years.

On October 22, 2012, the Twins hired Steinbach to be the bench coach and catching instructor on manager Ron Gardenhire's coaching staff, succeeding Steve Liddle. Stuart Turner, a catching prospect for the Twins, credited Steinbach's tutelage in spring training for his improvement as a catcher. In 2014, Steinbach managed games in April and August, when Gardenhire was unable to attend the game.

== Personal life ==
Steinbach and his wife, Mary, have three children. Their two sons both played college baseball.

Terry's brothers, Tim and Tom, were teammates on the Golden Gophers' baseball team. Tim was a catcher and Tom was the right fielder.

In August 2024, Steinbach was inducted into the Oakland Athletics Hall of Fame.

== See also ==
- List of Major League Baseball players with a home run in their first major league at bat
