= Mike Moore (baseball) =

American baseball player (born 1959)

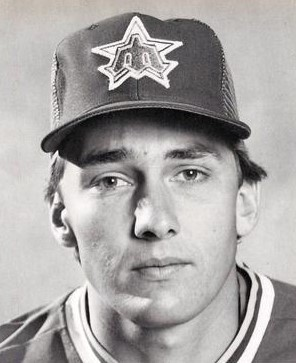
- Pitcher
- Born: November 26, 1959 (age 66); Eakly, Oklahoma, U.S.
- Batted: Right Threw: Right

MLB debut
- April 11, 1982, for the Seattle Mariners

Last MLB appearance
- August 31, 1995, for the Detroit Tigers

MLB statistics
- Win–loss record: 161–176
- Earned run average: 4.39
- Strikeouts: 1,667
- Stats at Baseball Reference

Teams
- Seattle Mariners (1982–1988); Oakland Athletics (1989–1992); Detroit Tigers (1993–1995)

Career highlights and awards
- All-Star (1989); World Series champion (1989)

Michael Wayne Moore (born November 26, 1959) is an American former Major League Baseball (MLB) pitcher.

Moore pitched for Oral Roberts University in college, going 28–11 with an ERA of 2.64. The Seattle Mariners drafted him with the first pick overall in the 1981 MLB amateur draft. During a 14-year baseball career, Moore pitched for the Mariners (1982–1988), Oakland Athletics (1989–1992) and the Detroit Tigers (1993–1995).

Moore made his MLB debut on April 11, 1982, and played his final game on August 31, 1995. His had a career regular season win–loss record of 161–176 with a 4.39 earned run average (ERA), 79 complete games, and 16 shutouts in 450 games pitched (2,831 2/3 innings pitched). In 1989 with Oakland Moore set career bests with 19 wins, a 2.61 ERA and a .219 batting average against. He was elected to the American League All-Star team that year and finished third in AL Cy Young Award voting.

Moore played for the Athletics in two World Series. He was a member of the A's team that swept the San Francisco Giants in the 1989 World Series, starting and winning two of the four games and hitting a double as well. He was also on the A's team that lost to the Cincinnati Reds in the 1990 World Series. In five postseason series, Moore made seven career starts and compiled a 4–3 won-loss record with a 3.29 ERA. When he retired, his 161 wins were the most by a number one draft pick in league history; Gerrit Cole later surpassed him in 2026.

Preceded by Darryl Strawberry	First overall pick in the MLB Entry Draft; 1981	Succeeded by Shawon Dunston
Preceded by Gaylord Perry	Opening Day starting pitcher for the Seattle Mariners; 1984, 1985, 1986	Succeeded by Mark Langston
