= 1989 World Series =

1989 Major League Baseball championship series

Team (Wins)	Managers	Season
Oakland Athletics (4)	Tony La Russa	99–63, .611, GA: 7
San Francisco Giants (0)	Roger Craig	92–70, .568, GA: 3
- Dates: October 14–28
- Venue(s): Oakland–Alameda County Coliseum (Oakland); Candlestick Park (San Francisco)
- MVP: Dave Stewart (Oakland)
- Umpires: Rich Garcia (AL), Paul Runge (NL), Al Clark (AL), Dutch Rennert (NL), Vic Voltaggio (AL), Eric Gregg (NL)
- Hall of Famers: Athletics: Tony La Russa (manager); Dennis Eckersley; Rickey Henderson; Dave Parker; Giants: none

Broadcast
- Television: ABC
- TV announcers: Al Michaels, Jim Palmer and Tim McCarver
- Radio: CBS; KSFO (OAK); KNBR (SF)
- Radio announcers: Jack Buck and Johnny Bench (CBS); Bill King and Lon Simmons (KSFO); Hank Greenwald and Ron Fairly (KNBR)
- ALCS: Oakland Athletics over Toronto Blue Jays (4–1)
- NLCS: San Francisco Giants over Chicago Cubs (4–1)

The 1989 World Series was the championship series of Major League Baseball's (MLB) 1989 season. The 86th edition of the World Series, it was a best-of-seven playoff played between the American League (AL) champion Oakland Athletics and the National League (NL) champion San Francisco Giants. The Series ran from October 14 through October 28, with the Athletics sweeping the Giants in four games. It was the first World Series sweep since 1976, when the Cincinnati Reds swept the New York Yankees.

This marked the third all-California World Series matchup, as well as the fourth World Series matchup, and first since 1913, between the Athletics and Giants. The previous three matchups occurred when the Giants were in New York and the Athletics resided in Philadelphia. The then New York Giants defeated the Philadelphia Athletics in the 1905 World Series four games to one, the Athletics defeating the Giants in the 1911 World Series four games to two, and then again in the 1913 Fall Classic four games to one. The series would be historic in other ways as well: the 76-year gap between matchups was the longest in World Series history, a record this World Series would hold until 2018 when the Red Sox and Dodgers met for their first World Series meeting in 102 years; it also marked the first time two franchises had faced off in the World Series after having once played each other when both were based in a different city. As of 2026, this is the last time in which two teams from the same state met in the World Series back-to-back, and it was the first time that it had occurred since the Yankees and Dodgers met in the World Series in 1955 and 1956.

Fay Vincent, who had just taken over as the commissioner of baseball after the sudden death of his predecessor Bart Giamatti in September, presided over his first World Series and dedicated it to his predecessor's memory.

This Series was also known as the "Bay Bridge Series," "BART Series," "Battle of the Bay," and "Earthquake Series"; the two participant cities lie on opposite sides of San Francisco Bay, connected by the San Francisco–Oakland Bay Bridge and the Bay Area Rapid Transit (BART) system, and the 1989 Loma Prieta earthquake occurred before the start of Game 3. It was the first cross-town World Series (involving two teams from the same metropolitan area) since 1956, and only the third such series that did not involve New York City (the 1906 and 1944 World Series, which featured matchups between the Chicago Cubs and Chicago White Sox and the St. Louis Cardinals and St. Louis Browns respectively, were the others). Until 2023, this marked the last time that consecutive championships were won by different teams from the same state.

Prior to the start of Game 3 on October 17, at about 5:04 PM PDT, the Loma Prieta earthquake struck, damaging Oakland and San Francisco (particularly the Cypress Street Viaduct in the former and the Marina District in the latter) as well as the Bay Bridge's upper deck. Candlestick Park in San Francisco suffered damage to its upper deck as pieces of concrete fell from the baffle at the top of the stadium and the power was knocked out. The game was postponed out of concerns for the safety of everyone in the ballpark as well as the loss of power. The series resumed on October 27 and finished the next day.

At the time, October 28 was the latest end date ever for a World Series, tying the 1981 World Series and surpassing the 1986 World Series by one day, even though the 1989 series only lasted the minimum four games. Had the Series run the full seven games, it would have ended on October 31 or November 1, potentially extending the season into November for the first time in history.

== Background ==
This was the third all-California World Series (1974, 1988). The San Francisco Giants won the NL West division by three games over the San Diego Padres, then defeated the Chicago Cubs four games to one in the National League Championship Series. The Oakland Athletics won the AL West division by seven games over the Kansas City Royals, then defeated the Toronto Blue Jays four games to one in the American League Championship Series.

It was the Giants' first World Series appearance since 1962, while the Athletics were playing in their second straight Fall Classic following the 1988 Series.

== Summary ==
AL Oakland Athletics (4) vs. NL San Francisco Giants (0)

Game	Date	Score	Location	Time	Attendance
1	October 14	San Francisco Giants – 0, Oakland Athletics – 5	Oakland–Alameda County Coliseum	2:45	49,385
2	October 15	San Francisco Giants – 1, Oakland Athletics – 5	Oakland–Alameda County Coliseum	2:47	49,388
3	October 27†	Oakland Athletics – 13, San Francisco Giants – 7	Candlestick Park	3:03	62,038
4	October 28	Oakland Athletics – 9, San Francisco Giants – 6	Candlestick Park	3:07	62,032

† Game 3 was originally slated for October 17 at 5:35 pm; however, it was postponed when an earthquake occurred at 5:04 pm.

== Matchups ==
=== Game 1 ===
Saturday, October 14, 1989 5:31 pm (PT) at Oakland–Alameda County Coliseum in Oakland, California 57 °F (14 °C), cloudy
Team	1	2	3	4	5	6	7	8	9	R	H	E
San Francisco	0	0	0	0	0	0	0	0	0	0	5	1
Oakland	0	3	1	1	0	0	0	0	x	5	11	1
WP: Dave Stewart (1–0) LP: Scott Garrelts (0–1); Home runs: SF: None; OAK: Dave Parker (1), Walt Weiss (1)

Prior to Game 1, a tribute to late Commissioner Bart Giamatti was held; Giamatti's son Marcus threw out the first pitch, and the Whiffenpoofs from Yale University (Giamatti's alma mater) sang the national anthem. Dave Stewart, the Athletics' ace, took on Giants pitcher Scott Garrelts in Game 1 of the Bay Bridge series.

Oakland took the lead in the bottom of the second when Dave Henderson walked, advanced to second on a Terry Steinbach single, and scored on another single by Tony Phillips that moved Steinbach up to third. Walt Weiss then sent a soft ground ball toward first, but Giants first baseman (and NLCS MVP) Will Clark threw the ball low and to the right of catcher Terry Kennedy. Steinbach knocked the ball out of Kennedy's mitt, scoring the second run of the inning. Kennedy was charged with an error, and Phillips advanced to second. Rickey Henderson then drove in Phillips on a single to right field; the second inning ended with Oakland leading 3–0.

A's designated hitter Dave Parker tattooed a home run to lead off the third off of Garrelts, and Weiss added a lead off home run in the fourth. Oakland starter Stewart dominated the Giants, allowing five hits in a complete game, handing the A's a one-game edge in the Series. "We ran into a buzz saw", Clark said of Stewart's pitching.

=== Game 2 ===
Sunday, October 15, 1989 5:28 pm (PT) at Oakland–Alameda County Coliseum in Oakland, California 58 °F (14 °C), mostly cloudy
Team	1	2	3	4	5	6	7	8	9	R	H	E
San Francisco	0	0	1	0	0	0	0	0	0	1	4	0
Oakland	1	0	0	4	0	0	0	0	x	5	7	0
WP: Mike Moore (1–0) LP: Rick Reuschel (0–1); Home runs: SF: None; OAK: Terry Steinbach (1)

Little League World Series MVP and future NHL star Chris Drury threw out the ceremonial first pitch in Game 2. Oakland starter Mike Moore took on Giant Rick Reuschel.

Oakland got off to a fast start; Rickey Henderson led off the bottom of the first with a walk. Henderson promptly stole second, and scored one pitch later when Carney Lansford hit a double to right field. The Giants scored their first run of the Series in the top of the third; José Uribe reached first on a fielder's choice, advanced to third via a Brett Butler single, and scored on a Robby Thompson sacrifice fly.

The A's regained the lead in the bottom of the 4th when Dave Parker drove a line shot off the wall that was both an inch from being foul and an inch from being a home run. Jose Canseco, who drew a walk earlier that inning, scored on the play. Parker stood at the plate for a moment to watch the flight of the ball, and started to run as soon as the ball hit the wall; Giants right fielder Candy Maldonado appeared to throw Parker out at second, but second base umpire Dutch Rennert called Parker safe. After Dave Henderson walked and Mark McGwire struck out, Terry Steinbach hit a three-run home run off Reuschel to left field, scoring both Parker and Henderson. The Giants had no answer for Oakland's relievers, and the A's won 5–1 and took a 2–0 lead in the Series.

=== The Loma Prieta earthquake ===
The 1989 Loma Prieta earthquake struck on October 17, 1989, at 5:04 p.m. Game 3 was scheduled to start at 5:35 p.m. at Candlestick Park in San Francisco, and thousands of people were already in the stadium when the quake hit. It was the first major earthquake in the United States to be broadcast by live television. Experts credit the timing of the World Series as a lucky break that prevented massive loss of life in the region; key in reducing the loss of life was that many people on both sides of the bay had left work early or were staying late to participate in after-work group viewings and parties, reducing the traffic that would otherwise have been on the collapsed freeways at 5:04 p.m. on a Tuesday (42 people had died in the collapse of the Cypress Street Viaduct in Oakland). A Goodyear Blimp that was covering the telecast was used to coordinate emergency efforts.

At the time the earthquake hit, ABC's crew was in the booth as Tim McCarver was presenting a highlight package. The earthquake hit while the video was playing and temporarily knocked the feed out, and just before it was knocked out Al Michaels could be heard on air saying "I'll tell you what, we're having an earth-" with the feed cutting out just before he finished. The feed ended up being replaced with a green ABC Sports "World Series" telop graphic as used for technical difficulties. On KGO-TV's feed, the telop graphic was replaced with a station identification slide, recycled from the network's 1986–87 "Together" campaign, with "Please Stand By" text on top of the Circle 7 logo, because of the station lost power for almost 15 minutes upon the start of the earthquake. Michaels, McCarver, and third man in the booth Jim Palmer grabbed for whatever they could to brace themselves and grabbed on to one another's legs, leaving all three men with thigh bruises. When the audio was restored, first to be heard was the sound of the fans cheering, and then Michaels began talking over a screen bumper, jokingly saying that the earthquake was the "greatest opening in the history of television, bar none!"

By contrast, the broadcasting team in the CBS Radio booth next door, consisting of Jack Buck, Johnny Bench, and John Rooney, was off the air when the earthquake started because their show was in a pretaped segment being played from New York. Bench ran to a spot underneath a steel grate, to which Buck later quipped, "If he moved that fast when he played, he'd never hit into a double play. I never saw anyone move that fast in my life."

ESPN reporters were at the stadium, but were not on air when it hit, and the channel was instead airing a bodybuilder contest at the time. Their equipment van was the only one with a generator, and their reporters went live at 5:22 p.m. with news coverage by Chris Berman and Bob Ley.

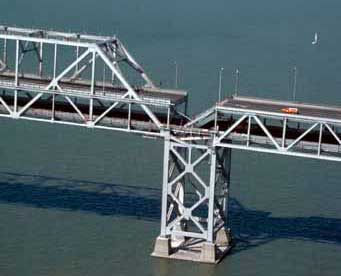
The collapse of the Bay Bridge forced Oakland players to return home via San Jose.

In the immediate aftermath of the earthquake, ABC aired a rerun of Roseanne (and later The Wonder Years) before Ted Koppel began anchoring news coverage from Washington at 5:21 p.m., with Michaels acting as a de facto reporter. The Goodyear Blimp (which was already aloft for the game) provided video of structural damage and fires within the city. The ABC opening for this telecast (leading up to Al Michaels informing the viewers of the earthquake) was used at the beginning of a 1990 television movie (documenting the Loma Prieta earthquake) called After the Shock.

As for the Series itself, Fay Vincent decided to postpone Game 3 initially for five days, resulting in the longest delay in World Series history. Vincent told no one before doing so, resulting in an umpire protest, although the original reason for the postponement was loss of power in the stadium, concern about possible structural damage, and the danger of possible aftershocks. It was postponed for another five days (until October 27) because of delays in restoring transmission links. Then San Francisco mayor Art Agnos wanted to wait a month before resuming it, with Vincent responding to Agnos by telling him that he might move it elsewhere if the delay would be that long. With that, Vincent quickly had several other National and American League parks put on standby, including Wrigley Field and Comiskey Park in Chicago, the Kingdome in Seattle, the Astrodome in Houston, or Yankee Stadium and Shea Stadium in New York City. (Moving the game to the opponents' stadium was not an option, because the Athletics were also based in the San Francisco Bay Area. Also, it was noted in the news media that there were three major league stadiums in Southern California: Anaheim Stadium in Anaheim, Dodger Stadium in Los Angeles, and Jack Murphy Stadium in San Diego.)

Players for the Athletics returned home, but had to travel via State Route 237 in San Jose, adding an extra 90 minutes due to the collapse of the Bay Bridge and the I-880 Cypress Street Viaduct along with the closures of the San Mateo–Hayward and Dumbarton Bridges. Not long after returning, Jose Canseco (still in full uniform) and his wife Esther were spotted filling up their car at a self-service gas station. As noted in his later book Juiced, Canseco noted that someone wrote an article portraying him as chauvinistic for forcing his wife to pump the gas, but that in reality, she told him to let her do it because if people saw him in his full uniform, it would cause a scene.

=== Game 3 ===
Friday, October 27, 1989 5:28 pm (PT) at Candlestick Park in San Francisco, California 60 °F (16 °C), clear
Team	1	2	3	4	5	6	7	8	9	R	H	E
Oakland	2	0	0	2	4	1	0	4	0	13	14	0
San Francisco	0	1	0	2	0	0	0	0	4	7	10	3
WP: Dave Stewart (2–0) LP: Scott Garrelts (0–2); Home runs: OAK: Dave Henderson 2 (2), Tony Phillips (1), Jose Canseco (1), Carney Lansford (1); SF: Matt Williams (1), Bill Bathe (1)

During the ten-day delay, Candlestick Park was inspected and found to have only minor damage. This was quickly repaired, and the stadium was deemed safe to use. A series of ceremonies took place before the start of Game 3. A moment of silence was first observed for those who died in the earthquake, followed by a performance of the "Theme from San Francisco" by the cast of Beach Blanket Babylon. Stevie Wonder was slated to play the national anthem on his harmonica at Game 3 on October 17, but pulled out days following the earthquake. Instead, Larry Gatlin and the Gatlin Brothers, who had been slated to perform at Game 4 on October 18, sang the anthem before Game 3. Finally, emergency responders who had aided during the earthquake, including police officers and firefighters, were honored and threw out the ceremonial first pitch.

The starters were the Game 1 starters, Stewart and Garrelts. The ten-day delay due to the earthquake allowed both staff aces to start.

Dave Henderson just missed hitting three home runs for the Athletics as his first inning shot bounced off the top of the wall for a double.

Giants catcher Bill Bathe became the fifth National League player in World Series history to hit a home run in his very first at-bat.

When Game 3 was originally scheduled for October 17, the scheduled starting pitchers were Bob Welch for the A's and Don Robinson for the Giants. Meanwhile, Ken Oberkfell was slated to start at third base for the Giants, with Matt Williams moving over to shortstop instead of the benched José Uribe. Also, Pat Sheridan was slated to take over for Candy Maldonado in right field for the Giants. Maldonado told ESPN that he was in the clubhouse getting ready when the earthquake hit. The first person he saw in the midst of all of this was his teammate, Robinson, who told Maldonado that he sensed that an earthquake was occurring. For Oakland, Ron Hassey was slated to be the starting catcher for Game 3 in place of Terry Steinbach, as Hassey was at the time Welch's personal catcher.

This game set a record for most combined home runs hit in a World Series game (7) as well as tying a record for most home runs hit by a single team (5) in a World Series game (the New York Yankees won Game 4 of the 1928 World Series against the St. Louis Cardinals, which like this series, would end in a sweep). This record for combined home runs in a World Series game would endure until Game 2 in 2017, in which the Astros and Dodgers combined for 8 home runs.

=== Game 4 ===
Saturday, October 28, 1989 5:28 pm (PT) at Candlestick Park in San Francisco, California 63 °F (17 °C), clear
Team	1	2	3	4	5	6	7	8	9	R	H	E
Oakland	1	3	0	0	3	1	0	1	0	9	12	0
San Francisco	0	0	0	0	0	2	4	0	0	6	9	0
WP: Mike Moore (2–0) LP: Don Robinson (0–1) Sv: Dennis Eckersley (1); Home runs: OAK: Rickey Henderson (1); SF: Kevin Mitchell (1), Greg Litton (1)

After Nell Carter sang the national anthem, Willie Mays (who was initially scheduled to throw out the first pitch on October 17 and was about to be interviewed by ABC's Joe Morgan when the earthquake hit) threw out the ceremonial first pitch.

The A's led from the first batter of the game on as Rickey Henderson's home run set the tone. Kevin Mitchell's homer would bring the Giants closer as they cut an 8–0 deficit to 8–6 in two innings. But it would prove to be too little too late for San Francisco as they would lose 9–6.

This was also Candlestick Park's final World Series game. The Giants' four subsequent National League pennants have come since their move to Oracle Park, in 2002, 2010, 2012 and 2014 (with the last three appearances also ending in World Series championships).

Out of respect for the earthquake victims, the Athletics chose not to celebrate their World Series victory with champagne, as is normally customary for the winning team in the World Series.

=== Composite box ===
1989 World Series (4–0): Oakland Athletics (A.L.) beat San Francisco Giants (N.L.).

Team	1	2	3	4	5	6	7	8	9	R	H	E
Oakland Athletics	4	6	1	7	7	2	0	5	0	32	44	1
San Francisco Giants	0	1	1	2	0	2	4	0	4	14	28	4
Total attendance: 222,843 Average attendance: 55,711; Winning player's share: $114,252 Losing player's share: $83,529

== Radio and television coverage ==
ABC play-by-play man Al Michaels, who spent three years in San Francisco as an announcer for the San Francisco Giants, was nominated for an Emmy Award for news broadcasting after giving an eyewitness account of the aftermath of the earthquake at Candlestick Park.

This would be the last World Series that ABC would televise from start to finish (and also the last they would produce themselves), and Game 4 was the last MLB game on ABC until July 1994. The television rights would move exclusively to CBS the following year (ABC had shared coverage with NBC since 1976 up until the end of the 1989 season). ABC would next televise a World Series in 1995, but only broadcast Games 1, 4, and 5 (the other games were covered by NBC, who had a joint venture with ABC and MLB called The Baseball Network); this was caused in this case by the strike during the 1994 season which cancelled the 1994 World Series, which ABC would have televised; NBC would have had the exclusive rights to the 1995 World Series.

Due in part to the earthquake and subsequent interruption of play, as well as the four-game sweep by the Athletics, ABC only drew an overall Nielsen rating of 16.4 for the Series. This was the first World Series since the introduction of prime-time games in 1971 to draw a rating of less than 20.

This was also the last World Series to be simulcast on the Global Television Network in Canada. Global had aired the World Series in odd-numbered years while CTV had aired in even-numbered years. CTV would hold exclusive World Series rights from 1990 until 1996.

As previously mentioned, CBS Radio also covered the Series. Jack Buck returned for his seventh and last World Series as the radio voice for CBS, as he was to move to the television side the next year. He was joined by Johnny Bench as his analyst, who replaced Bill White when he was appointed to replace Giamatti as president of the National League earlier in the year. Buck was replaced by Vin Scully the next year, who made his return to CBS Radio following NBC Sports' loss of television rights to CBS. Bench covered four more World Series for CBS Radio with the 1993 series being his last.

== Aftermath ==
1989 would turn out be the Athletics' final championship as an Oakland-based franchise, as the team left the city for Sacramento in 2024, to play as the Athletics (with no city name), while preparing to relocate and play in Las Vegas as the Las Vegas Athletics by 2028.

The Athletics would return to the World Series the following season, making it three years in a row. However, they were unsuccessful in defending their championship as the Cincinnati Reds swept them in 4 games.

The Athletics have not returned to the World Series since then and has only made two appearances in the American League Championship Series—losing in 1992 to the Toronto Blue Jays and in 2006 to the Detroit Tigers—and a total of 12 times in the postseason (1992, 2000, 2001, 2002, 2003, 2006, 2012, 2013, 2014, 2018, 2019 and 2020) since the 1990 Series. At the time of the 1989 World Series, the Athletics had not seen a World Series win since 1974.

The Giants, meanwhile, failed to repeat as National League Champions and would not return to the playoffs until 1997, when they were swept by the Florida Marlins in the NLDS. The Giants would not return to the World Series until 2002, when they lost a seven-game series to the Anaheim Angels after holding a 3–2 series lead. It took the Giants until 2010 to get back to the World Series, and they won their first world championship since 1954, when the team was still located in New York, by defeating the Texas Rangers in five games. In 2012, the Giants would go back to the World Series and defeat the Detroit Tigers in a four-game sweep, and in 2014 they would beat the Kansas City Royals in seven games to capture their third World Series crown in five seasons.

On the Athletics, players Mark McGwire and Jose Canseco would later play for other teams. McGwire would be traded to the St. Louis Cardinals in 1997, where he would beat Roger Maris' single-season home run record in 1998 and retire as a Cardinal in 2001. Canseco was traded during the 1992 season to the Texas Rangers and after that bounced around from team to team including a return to Oakland in 1997. He would later win the 2000 World Series with the New York Yankees. Canseco retired in 2001 after a stint with the Chicago White Sox. Manager Tony La Russa remained with the Athletics until 1995, when he resigned to take the managerial position in St. Louis, where he again got the chance to manage McGwire. La Russa would remain with the Cardinals through 2011 after having led the team to three World Series and two world championships. In 2021, he began a two-year stint as manager of the Chicago White Sox.

Giants manager Roger Craig (affectionately known as "Humm Baby") was fired after the 1992 season and replaced by Dusty Baker, who managed the team to their next World Series. The final member of the 1989 team, Matt Williams, was traded to the Cleveland Indians after the 1996 season in a trade that brought future Giants star Jeff Kent to the team. Williams would eventually win a World Series as a member of the Arizona Diamondbacks in 2001, and retired in 2003.

Kevin Mitchell would never regain the form that helped him win the National League MVP award in 1989, and after his production declined in the next two seasons he was traded to the Seattle Mariners in the 1991 offseason. Brett Butler would leave after one more season with the Giants, going to play for the Los Angeles Dodgers. Wins leader Rick Reuschel was gone after the following season, retiring in 1991. Finally, Will Clark was let go by the Giants after 1993 due to a decline in production thanks in large part to injuries that kept him out of the lineup for much of the previous three seasons. Clark signed with the Texas Rangers and despite not being able to escape the injury bug, he was a productive member of the team for the next five seasons. Clark retired following the 2000 season, where he made one last trip to the postseason as a member of La Russa's Cardinals.

On June 13, 2009, immediately prior to the second game of the interleague regular season meeting between the Giants and A's, the Giants honored 27 members of their 1989 team.

The A's victory continued a string of success for any Bay Area-based professional sports team. The San Francisco 49ers of the NFL continued its '80s dynasty by winning Super Bowl XXIII and XXIV in between the Athletics' World Series triumph. The next championship for the city of Oakland came in 2015, when the Golden State Warriors of the NBA won the 2015 NBA Finals. Later, the Golden State Warriors would win the 2017 and 2018 NBA Finals, defeating the Cleveland Cavaliers.

This was the only official postseason match-up featuring two opposing Northern California teams in the four major American sports until the 2023 NBA First Round match-up between the Sacramento Kings and the Golden State Warriors.

This would be the first time that the World Series ended in the last week of October, until the 2001 World Series when the 9/11 attacks delayed the NFL and MLB games for a week, and caused the World Series to end in November. The 1981 World Series also finished on October 28. As of today, with multiple postseason rounds being added in the Wild Card era (1995–present), World Series regularly end during the first week of November.

== See also ==
- 1989 Japan Series
- List of World Series sweeps
- 1989 Loma Prieta earthquake
