= Dyar Miller =

American baseball player (born 1946)

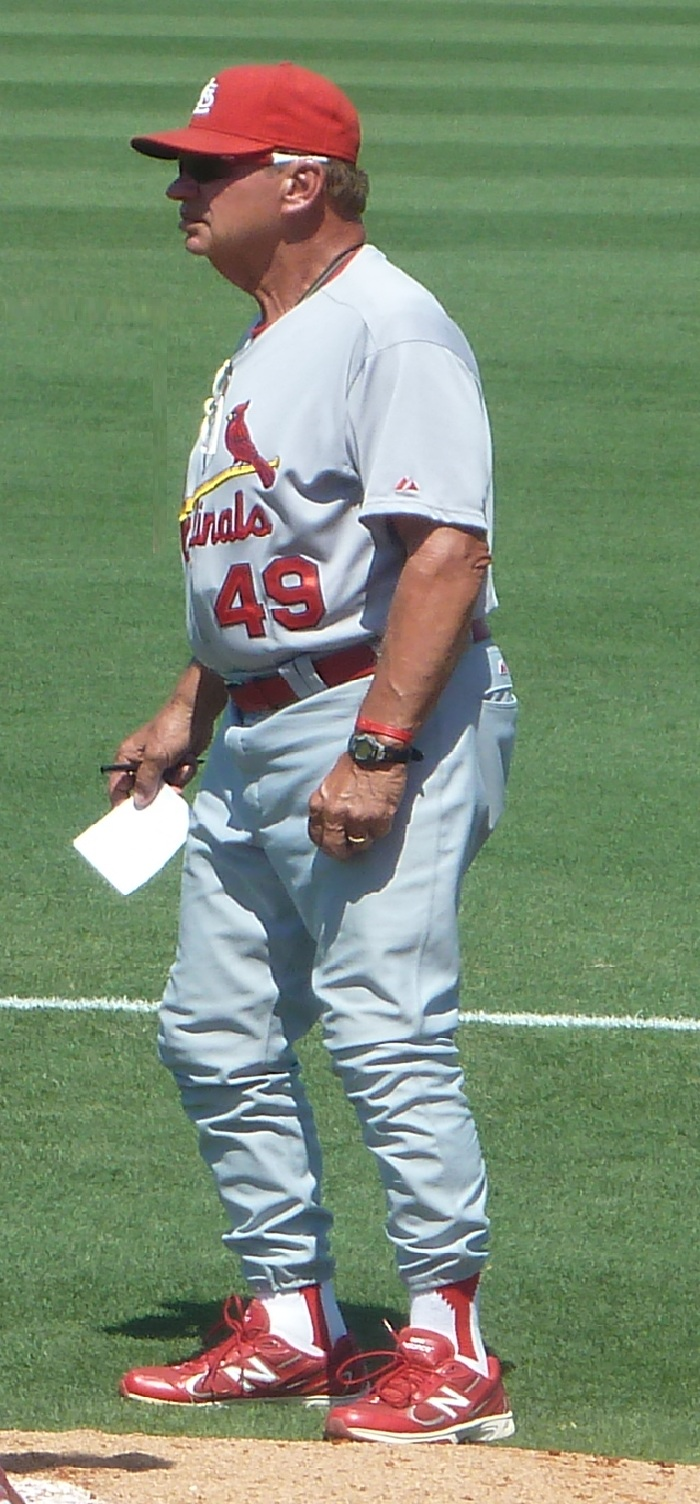
- Pitcher
- Born: May 29, 1946 (age 80); Batesville, Indiana, U.S.
- Batted: Right Threw: Right

MLB debut
- June 9, 1975, for the Baltimore Orioles

Last MLB appearance
- September 2, 1981, for the New York Mets

MLB statistics
- Win–loss record: 23–17
- Earned run average: 3.23
- Strikeouts: 235
- Stats at Baseball Reference

Teams
- Baltimore Orioles (1975–1977); California Angels (1977–1979); Toronto Blue Jays (1979); New York Mets (1980–1981)

Dyar K. Miller (born May 29, 1946) is an American former professional baseball pitcher and coach. A graduate of Utah State, Miller pitched 13 seasons in professional baseball between 1968 and 1984, including seven seasons in Major League Baseball (MLB) for the Baltimore Orioles, California Angels, Toronto Blue Jays, and New York Mets. After his playing career, Miller coached and instructed for 28 seasons (19 in the St. Louis Cardinals organization), mainly in the minor leagues. He most recently served as the Cardinals' bullpen coach in 2012.

== College ==
Miller graduated from Utah State University with a Bachelor of Science in history.

== Playing career (1968–84) ==
After graduating from Utah State, Miller availed himself for the MLB draft but was not chosen. He signed with the Philadelphia Phillies as a catcher and was assigned to the Huron Phillies, where Dallas Green was the manager. However, after two errors and four games, the Phillies released him. Miller decided to pursue pitching instead, and in 1969, the Orioles signed him. Between the Florida Instructional League Orioles (a Rookie League team) and the Stockton Ports (a Class-A California League team), Miller appeared in 36 games, making 13 starts and compiling 153 innings pitched (IP) with a 2.47 earned run average (ERA).

Miller became more successful at pitching than at catching. He pitched mainly as a starter for the Orioles' double-A affiliates from 1970 to 1972 – two seasons with the Dallas–Fort Worth Spurs and one with the Ashville Orioles. In 1973, Miller's first season in AAA, he posted a 2.75 ERA in 15 games and 72 IP for the Rochester Red Wings. He also played the next two seasons for Rochester. In 1974, Miller pitched 28 games, starting 26. He finished with a 2.70 ERA in 190 IP, allowing 143 hits, 95 bases on balls (BB) while striking out 138, completing nine games (CG) while finishing with a 12–8 won–lost record (W–L).

The Orioles invited Miller to spring training in 1975. With a hunch that it could be his last chance for a promotion to the Major Leagues, he "posted the best ERA" in the exhibition season. In spite of impressive showing, manager Earl Weaver informed him the Orioles had assigned him to start the season at Rochester. Miller responded with an angry outburst. However, Weaver was empathetic, later admitting to a Sporting News reporter that he "felt sorry for the guy" and that "he had earned the chance to pitch in the big leagues." The Orioles' attempts to trade him to a team that had room to allow him to pitch in the Major Leagues failed. When Miller returned to Rochester, he converted to pitch in relief. The change worked, as he posted a 2.20 ERA with five wins and seven saves in 19 appearances. He also allowed just 24 hits while striking out 38 in 41 IP, but walked 25.

The Orioles finally called Miller up later that season and he made his MLB debut on June 9 against the Oakland Athletics, just two weeks after turning age 29. Dave Duncan was the opposing catcher that game as Miller took the loss. For the season, he appeared in 30 games, all in relief, compiling 46 1/3 IP with 33 SO and a 2.72 ERA. He was traded by the Orioles to the California Angels for Dick Drago on June 13, 1977.

The Mets released Miller after the 1981 season. In Miller's seven Major League seasons, he pitched 465 1/3 innings in 251 total games, making one start, and compiling a 3.23 ERA with 22 saves. He also pitched 13 total seasons in the minor leagues. After his release from the Mets, Miller pitched three more years in the Cardinals organization with the Louisville Redbirds, where 1984 was his final season as a player.

Miller also played winter baseball in the Mexican Pacific League for two seasons with the Mayos de Navojoa.

== Coaching and baseball operations career (1985–2018) ==
After his playing career, Miller stayed in the Cardinals organization for the next two seasons. In 1985, Miller was named as pitching coach with the Cardinals' Class AA minor league club, the Arkansas Travelers, where Jim Riggleman was the manager. The next season, 1986, he returned to Louisville as the pitching coach, managed by Jim Fregosi. Fregosi left during the season to replace Tony La Russa as manager of the Chicago White Sox. The next season, Fregosi hired Miller as White Sox bullpen coach where he later on served as interim pitching coach while Don Rowe tended to his health concerns. The White Sox fired Fregosi following the 1988 season, and Miller took coaching roles in the Detroit Tigers (1989–1990) and Cleveland Indians (1991–1994) systems.

In 1995, Miller returned to the Cardinals organization, again as a pitching coach for Louisville. Through 2008, Miller coached, instructed, or retained leadership roles within the organization. Two years after returning to Louisville, he became a roving pitching instructor in the minor league system and held that role until 2000. Miller then spent the next seven years as pitching coach for their new AAA-affiliate, the Memphis Redbirds. He was then promoted to minor league pitching coordinator in 2008 and remained in that role through 2011.

On January 6, 2012, the Cardinals named Miller their bullpen coach after Duncan, the longtime pitching coach with former Cardinals manager La Russa, took a leave of absence. Former bullpen coach Derek Lilliquist substituted for Duncan, creating the opportunity for Miller. However, his tenure as bullpen coach was short-lived. The following October, the Cardinals announced he would not return in 2013. It was the only coaching change the Cardinals made at that time. No reason was directly given, although general manager John Mozeliak commented, "Just from a standpoint of when we were putting the coaching staff together last year, we were doing it quickly and Dyar deserved that opportunity. But when we look at this long-term, we want [manager] Mike [Matheny] to be able to put his fingerprints on it as well."

Dyar finished his coaching career within the Houston Astros organization. Retiring after the 2018 season.

== Honors ==
- George Kissell Award for excellence in player development in the Cardinals organization (2001)
- Indiana Baseball Hall of Fame inductee (2007)

== See also ==
- List of St. Louis Cardinals coaches
