= Cool Springs Farm =

- Formerly listed on the U.S. National Register of Historic Places
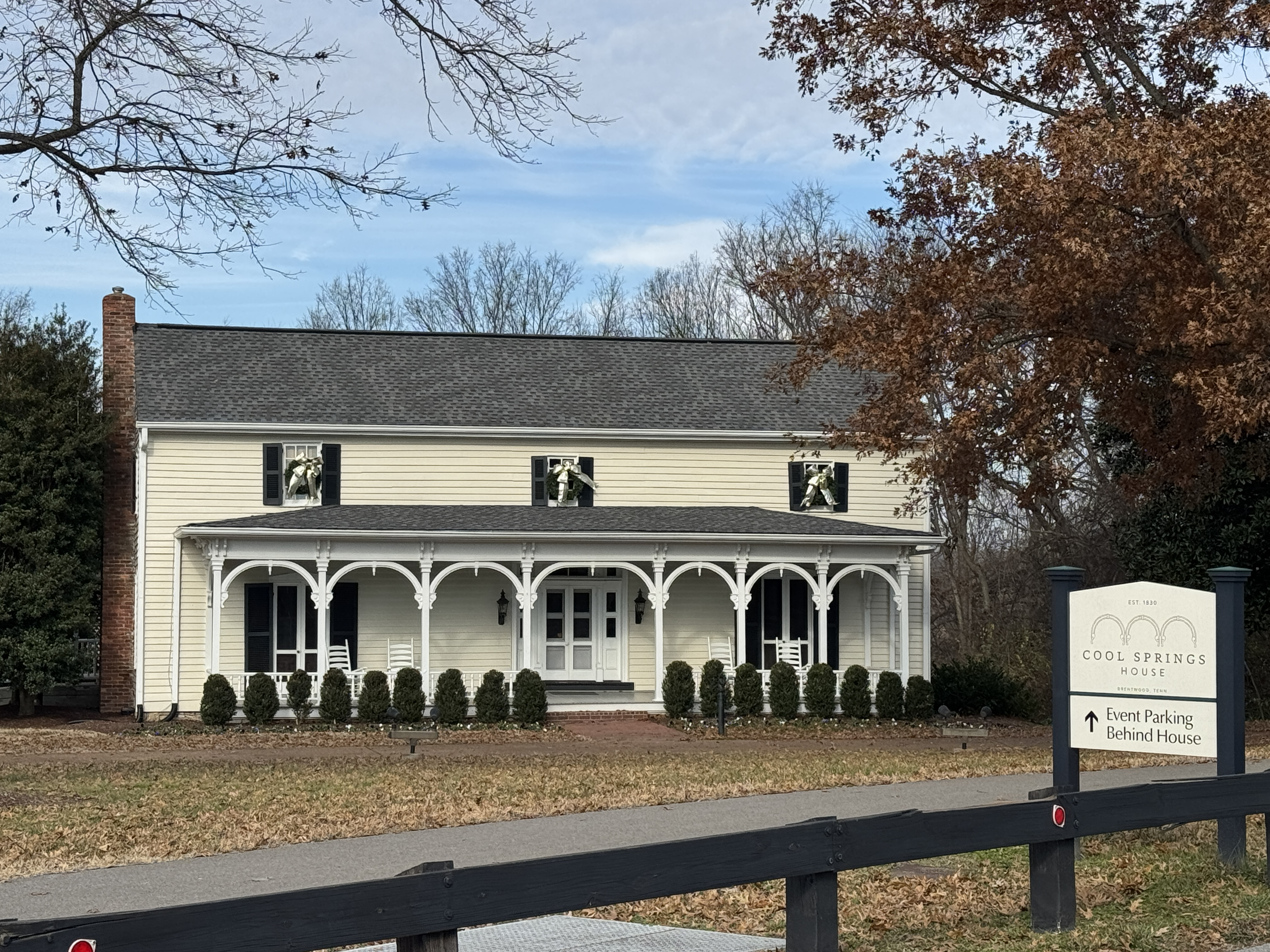
- Cool Springs Farm house following its relocation to Crockett Park

- Location within Tennessee Location within the United States
- Location: Jordan Rd., S of Moore's Lane, Franklin, Tennessee
- Coordinates: Original site: 35.9503°N 86.8195°W; Relocated: 35.9807°N 86.7705°W
- Area: 11 acres (4.5 ha)
- Built: c. 1830 and c. 1856
- Architectural style: Late Victorian and Greek Revival
- NRHP reference No.: 83004314
- Removed from NRHP: October 20, 1993

Cool Springs Farm was a property in Franklin, Tennessee that was listed on the National Register of Historic Places in 1983 but was removed from the register in 1993. The property was also known as Mallory Valley Farm.

== History ==
An original log house on the property was built circa 1830 by Dr. James Carothers and was enlarged and remodelled circa 1856 by his son.

In 1993 the property was acquired by the City of Brentwood and the log house was dismantled and moved to Crockett Park, where it has been restored by volunteers.

When listed, the property included five contributing buildings on an area of 11 acres (4.5 ha).
