= Brentwood, Tennessee =

- City
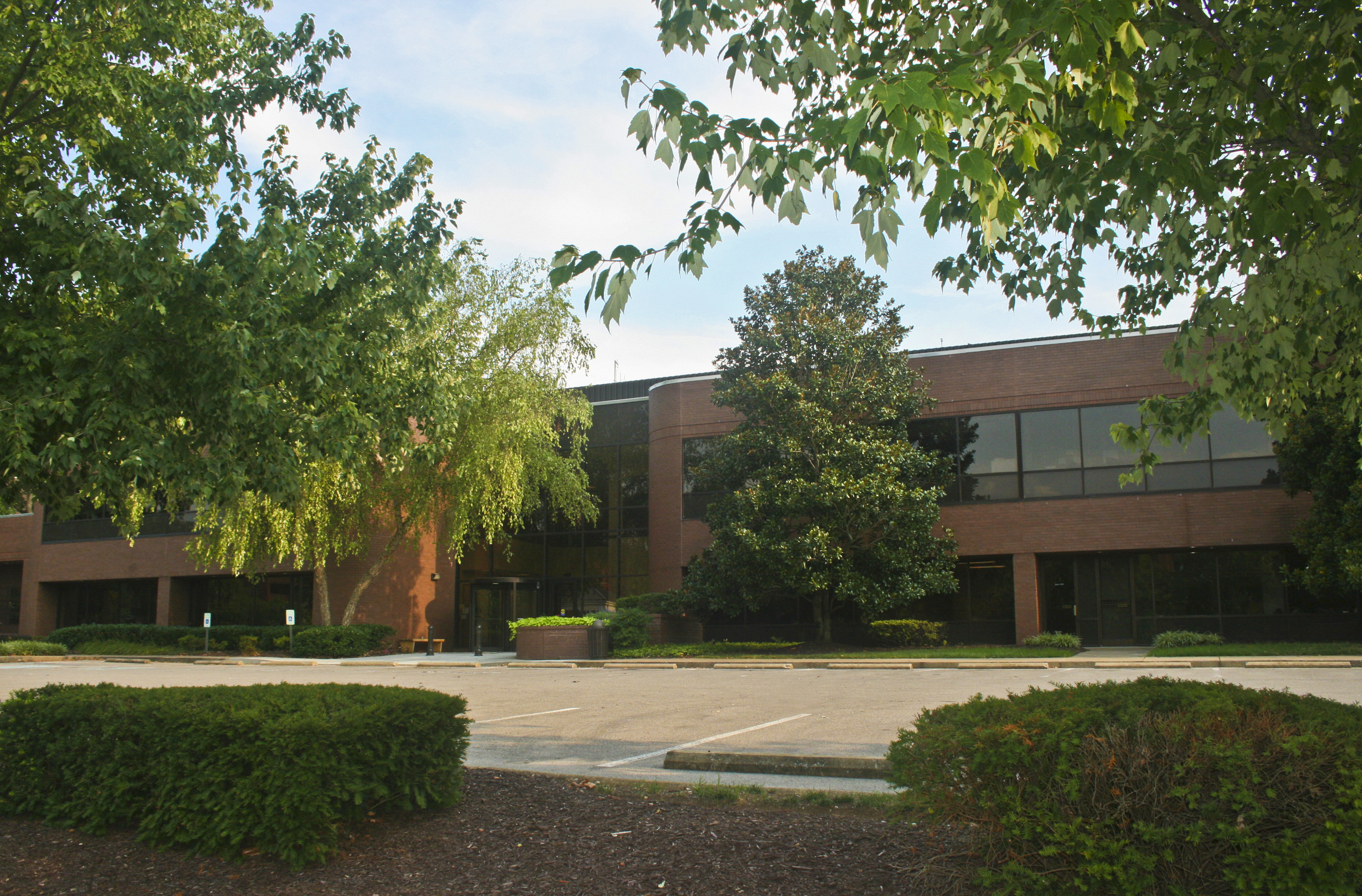
- Brentwood City Hall

- Flag Seal
- Motto: Ardens Fide "Burning faith"
- Location of Brentwood in Williamson County, Tennessee.
- Coordinates: 35°59′53″N 86°47′33″W
- Country: United States
- State: Tennessee
- County: Williamson
- Incorporated: 1969

Area
  - Total: 41.52 sq mi (107.53 km^{2})
  - Land: 41.47 sq mi (107.41 km^{2})
  - Water: 0.042 sq mi (0.11 km^{2})
- Elevation: 745 ft (227 m)

Population (2020)
  - Total: 45,373
  - Density: 1,094.0/sq mi (422.41/km^{2})
- Time zone: UTC-6 (Central (CST))
  - Summer (DST): UTC-5 (CDT)
- ZIP Codes: 37024, 37027
- Area code: 615/629
- FIPS code: 47-08280
- GNIS feature ID: 1278282
- Website: brentwoodtn.gov

Brentwood is a city in Williamson County, Tennessee, United States. The population was 45,373 as of the 2020 United States census. It is a suburb of Nashville and included in the Nashville metropolitan area.

== History ==
Successive cultures of prehistoric Native Americans occupied this area for thousands of years. In the first millennium of the Common Era (CE), Mississippian culture people, known locally as the Mound Indians or Stone Box Indians, built complex earthwork mounds topped with ceremonial buildings. Their settlement was part of a culture that spread throughout the Mississippi Valley and its major tributaries, and traded with other groups across the continent.

Artifacts and mounds of the Mississippian culture have been found during development in the Meadowlake subdivision, and at the library site on Concord Road. Primm Historic Park contains and preserves the largest of the earthwork mounds, which is still visible today. By 1300 these people had largely abandoned this settlement; archeologists have struggled to determine the reasons. There may have been epidemic disease, environmental problems, or warfare with other tribes.

=== European-American settlement ===
When early European-American settlers arrived in this area in the late 1700s from east of the Appalachian Mountains, it was largely being used as a hunting ground by Native American tribes from Georgia and Alabama. This resulted in many conflicts as the whites encroached on their territory and competed for their resources. In 1786, soon after the United States gained independence, Creek or Cherokee warriors raided the Mayfield family fort, at a site that is now the intersection of Wilson Pike and Old Smyrna Road. Southerland Mayfield and two other men were killed, and the boy George Mayfield was taken captive. One of the Creek families adopted him, as was their practice with war captives. Most Native American tribes adopted young captives to replace individuals they had lost to illness or warfare. After ten years, George Mayfield was returned to European-American society.

Some of the first European-American families here were those headed by James Sneed, Robert Irvin Moore, Thomas Hardeman, Gersham Hunt, Samuel and Andrew Crockett, and John Edmondson, who arrived well before 1800. The Holts, Herberts, Frosts, Hadleys, Hightowers, McGavocks, and Owens soon followed. Many of these families had received land grants in this area because of the men's service in the Virginia or North Carolina militia during the Revolutionary War. Many of these families' historic homes have been preserved and may be seen in the 21st century.

What is now called the Cool Springs House in Crockett Park, was first owned by Dr. Robert Carothers and his wife Martha Crockett. They built it at where the intersection of Mallory Lane and Cool Springs Boulevard is now located. Through the years, it passed through numerous owners and renovations. In 1974, the city of Brentwood moved the house to its current location of Crockett Park. Its former site was in an area of rapid growth and development that threatened preservation of the historic asset.

The Frost place on Old Smyrna Road was a center of frontier businesses, with a general store, grist mill, and post office soon developed located there. Settlers planted churches, predominately Methodist, and built up community life. When the railroad was constructed through this area, it established a depot in the town. The city realigned around the depot, which was the link to the newest form of transportation. It became the center of commerce for the present downtown area. The village of Brentwood thrived as the area was developed for cotton plantations.

=== Civil War ===
During the American Civil War, on March 25, 1863, Confederate Brig. Gen. Nathan Bedford Forrest led a column of men into Union-controlled Brentwood, intent on recapturing this section of the Nashville & Decatur Railroad. Forrest performed a quick sneak attack on Union Lt. Col. Edward Bloodgood. Forrest had cut the telegraph wires, isolating Bloodgood as he brought in heavy artillery. Bloodgood surrendered Brentwood that day, which was a significant loss for the Federals. Overall, there were 305 Union and 6 Confederate casualties. Much of Brentwood was destroyed in the battle.

After the Civil War, many of the large plantations were sold or had plots leased to freedmen sharecroppers and tenant farmers. Smaller farms dotted the countryside. Tobacco became the commodity crop of choice. The population was stable for almost 100 years.

=== 20th century to present ===
In the 1930s, even during the Great Depression, Brentwood began to rebound. One by one, businessmen and merchants from Nashville bought the former plantation houses. They began to revive fox hunting on their estates and raise quality horses.

On April 15, 1969, Brentwood incorporated as a city. That same year the interstate was built through the area, ushering a new period of residential and commercial growth. It made commuting easier for people who worked in Nashville and wanted to live in newer housing. The Maryland Farms office complex was built a few years later on what was once an American Saddle Horse farm and race track. The Brentwood Derby was run there until the mid 1970s.

Development has continued as Nashville has expanded its economy. In August 2016, developers announced a $270 million project in the Cool Springs area. It was to include commercial, hotel and retail development.

== Geography ==
As of the 2000 census, Brentwood had a land area of 35.4 square miles (92 km^{2}), but an annexation in 2001 increased the area to 40.8 square miles (106 km^{2}). In 2010, it was found that Brentwood had a population density of 899.9 per square mile.

== Climate ==
Brentwood has a humid subtropical climate (Köppen Cfa) with hot, humid summers and mild to cool winters. Precipitation occurs year-round, spring being slightly wetter and the late summer to early autumn being slightly drier. Snow and ice are an occasional nuisance during winter months, but amounts are typically light. Brentwood can experience severe weather year-round, and tornadoes are an enhanced risk from November through May. Three tornadoes that hit Brentwood in recent history occurred on December 24, 1988, January 30, 2013, and March 1, 2017. A little known fact is that Brentwood (as well as the western two-thirds of Tennessee) is within Dixie Alley, a region in the Southern United States that is at high risk from destructive tornadoes. The community also lies within USDA Plant Hardiness Zone 7.

Climate data for Brentwood, Tennessee, 1991–2020 normals, extremes 2000–2022
Month	Jan	Feb	Mar	Apr	May	Jun	Jul	Aug	Sep	Oct	Nov	Dec	Year
Record high °F (°C)	76 (24)	80 (27)	86 (30)	89 (32)	92 (33)	107 (42)	107 (42)	106 (41)	100 (38)	98 (37)	88 (31)	76 (24)	107 (42)
Mean maximum °F (°C)	66.4 (19.1)	71.8 (22.1)	79.2 (26.2)	84.7 (29.3)	88.6 (31.4)	94.1 (34.5)	95.8 (35.4)	96.1 (35.6)	93.4 (34.1)	86.7 (30.4)	76.2 (24.6)	69.6 (20.9)	97.8 (36.6)
Mean daily maximum °F (°C)	47.9 (8.8)	52.9 (11.6)	61.4 (16.3)	71.0 (21.7)	79.1 (26.2)	86.6 (30.3)	89.5 (31.9)	88.8 (31.6)	83.6 (28.7)	73.0 (22.8)	60.9 (16.1)	51.1 (10.6)	70.5 (21.4)
Daily mean °F (°C)	37.1 (2.8)	40.5 (4.7)	48.0 (8.9)	57.4 (14.1)	65.9 (18.8)	74.6 (23.7)	77.9 (25.5)	76.5 (24.7)	70.2 (21.2)	59.2 (15.1)	47.4 (8.6)	40.2 (4.6)	57.9 (14.4)
Mean daily minimum °F (°C)	26.2 (−3.2)	28.1 (−2.2)	34.6 (1.4)	43.7 (6.5)	52.6 (11.4)	62.6 (17.0)	66.2 (19.0)	64.2 (17.9)	56.9 (13.8)	45.3 (7.4)	33.9 (1.1)	29.2 (−1.6)	45.3 (7.4)
Mean minimum °F (°C)	9.7 (−12.4)	12.5 (−10.8)	20.5 (−6.4)	28.1 (−2.2)	39.5 (4.2)	53.3 (11.8)	55.4 (13.0)	55.1 (12.8)	45.7 (7.6)	30.4 (−0.9)	21.7 (−5.7)	14.3 (−9.8)	6.4 (−14.2)
Record low °F (°C)	−5 (−21)	−8 (−22)	0 (−18)	20 (−7)	30 (−1)	35 (2)	47 (8)	46 (8)	35 (2)	24 (−4)	12 (−11)	3 (−16)	−8 (−22)
Average precipitation inches (mm)	4.65 (118)	4.74 (120)	5.46 (139)	4.92 (125)	5.68 (144)	4.37 (111)	4.53 (115)	3.67 (93)	4.00 (102)	3.50 (89)	3.96 (101)	4.87 (124)	54.35 (1,381)
Source 1: NOAA
Source 2: National Weather Service (mean maxima/minima 2006–2020)

== Demographics ==
Historical population
Census	Pop.	Note	%±
1970	4,099		—
1980	9,431		130.1%
1990	16,392		73.8%
2000	23,445		43.0%
2010	37,060		58.1%
2020	45,373		22.4%
2025 (est.)	45,313	▼	−0.1%

=== 2020 census ===
As of the 2020 census, there were 45,373 people living in 14,741 households and 11,936 families in the city; the median age was 42.6 years. 28.4% of residents were under the age of 18 and 15.2% of residents were 65 years of age or older. For every 100 females there were 96.1 males, and for every 100 females age 18 and over there were 93.2 males age 18 and over.

There were 14,741 households in Brentwood, of which 44.1% had children under the age of 18 living in them. Of all households, 77.9% were married-couple households, 6.7% were households with a male householder and no spouse or partner present, and 13.9% were households with a female householder and no spouse or partner present. About 12.5% of all households were made up of individuals and 7.3% had someone living alone who was 65 years of age or older.

There were 15,279 housing units, of which 3.5% were vacant. The homeowner vacancy rate was 0.8% and the rental vacancy rate was 10.6%.

98.4% of residents lived in urban areas, while 1.6% lived in rural areas.

Racial composition as of the 2020 census
Race	Number	Percent
White	37,255	82.1%
Black or African American	1,443	3.2%
American Indian and Alaska Native	53	0.1%
Asian	3,658	8.1%
Native Hawaiian and Other Pacific Islander	9	0.0%
Some other race	359	0.8%
Two or more races	2,596	5.7%
Hispanic or Latino (of any race)	1,615	3.6%

=== 2010 census ===
As of the 2010 census, there were 37,060 people, comprising 11,791 households residing in the city. The population density was 676.7 inhabitants per square mile (261.3/km^{2}). There were 12,577 housing units at an average density of 227.7 per square mile (87.9/km^{2}). The racial makeup of the city was 90.0% white, 3.0% African American, 0.2% Native American, 5.0% Asian, and 1.6% from two or more races. Hispanic or Latino of any race were 2.1% of the population.

Educationally, at the 2010 census 98.4% of adult residents 25 and older held a high school diploma and 68.4% of adults possessed a bachelor's degree or higher. In 2014, the median household income in Brentwood was $138,395. The per capita income for the city was $58,745. About 2.0% of the population were below the poverty line. Real-estate firm Movoto ranked Brentwood as the seventh-wealthiest small town in the United States in 2014. In 2010, the average home sale in Brentwood was for $625,000.

In 2017, Brentwood, Tennessee had a population of 41.5k with a median age of 41.2 and a median household income of $151,722.

There were 11,791 households, out of which 48.2% had children under the age of 18 living with them, 82.2% were married couples living together, 4.9% had a female householder with no husband present, and 11.5% were non-families. 10.0% of all households were made up of individuals, and 3.2% had someone living alone who was 65 years of age or older. The average household size was 3.02 and the average family size was 3.24.

In the city, the population was spread out, with 31.5% under the age of 18, 4.3% from 18 to 24, 23.6% from 25 to 44, 32.4% from 45 to 64, and 8.2% who were 65 years of age or older. The median age was 41 years. For every 100 females, there were 97.1 males. For every 100 females age 18 and over, there were 93.2 males age 18 and over.

== Education ==
Brentwood is served by Williamson County Schools.

=== Elementary schools ===
- Crockett Elementary
- Edmondson Elementary
- Grassland Elementary
- Jordan Elementary
- Kenrose Elementary
- Lipscomb Elementary
- Scales Elementary
- Sunset Elementary

=== Middle schools ===
- Brentwood Middle
- Sunset Middle
- Woodland Middle
- Brentwood Academy (Private)

=== High schools ===
- Brentwood High School
- Ravenwood High School
- Brentwood Academy (Private)

== Parks ==
=== Concord Park ===
Concord Park is a 40-acre (160,000 m^{2}) park at Concord Road and Knox Valley Drive. It is home to the Brentwood Library and near Lipscomb Elementary School. Concord Park features paved walking and biking trails. A trailhead for a portion of the Concord Park walking trail is located adjacent to the Brentwood Family YMCA. There are also soccer fields.

=== Crockett Park ===
Crockett Park is Brentwood's 2nd largest park, at more than 170 acres (0.7 km^{2}). It features seven lit tennis courts, restroom/concessions buildings, eight lit ball fields, 11 multi-purpose fields, bikeway/jogging trails, a disc golf course, two historic homes, a community playground, picnic shelters, and the Eddy Arnold amphitheater. Crockett Park also has an indoor arena used for soccer, lacrosse, and flag football. It also serves as the home for Brentwood's yearly Fourth of July fireworks celebration. The City of Brentwood sponsors an annual summer concert series at the Eddy Arnold Amphitheater in Crockett Park, with free admission to the public.

=== Deerwood Arboretum and Nature Area ===
The Deerwood Arboretum and Nature Area is 27 acres (110,000 m^{2}) and has an observation deck, covered outdoor classrooms, and an amphitheater. The Arboretum contains man-made lakes, nature trails, and indigenous wildlife, and the Little Harpeth River flows through it.

=== Granny White Park ===
Granny White Park is a 32-acre (130,000 m^{2}) park with several sporting facilities including four lighted tennis courts, softball/baseball fields, jogging/biking trails, a multi-purpose field (soccer and lacrosse goals provided), sand volleyball court, playground, and picnic pavilion and is located near Brentwood Middle School.

=== Marcella Vivrette Smith Park ===
Smith Park is located off of Wilson Pike abutting the city limits. Comprising 397 acres, this park was purchased in 2010/2013 and has become Brentwood's largest park. Initial plans include walking, biking, and hiking trails, as well as multipurpose fields. The 1825 Ravenswood (Brentwood, Tennessee) mansion is a center piece to be used as a meeting place for the public. Many have used the mansion to hold weddings, receptions, or other gatherings. Phase I of the park was opened in the spring of 2014. Smith Park is the largest park in Brentwood, and has several walking and hiking trails.

=== Maryland Way Park ===
Maryland Way Park is located in the Maryland Farms area and includes a paved walking and biking path with 20 exercise stations on 7 acres (28,000 m^{2}). Maryland Way park is adjacent to the Maryland Farms YMCA.

=== Primm Park ===
Primm Park is a 31-acre (130,000 m^{2}) park off Moores Lane. Located on the site is Boiling Spring Academy, a historic schoolhouse built in 1832 and restored in 2003. The park is also home to the Fewkes Group Archaeological Site, a Mississippian mound complex consisting of five mounds arrayed around a central plaza. The Fewkes site is listed on the National Register of Historic Places.

=== Owl Creek Park ===
Owl Creek Park is Brentwood's second newest park, after Smith park, completed in the summer of 2007. It is 21 acres (85,000 m^{2}) and includes a playground, picnic shelters, walking paths, and basketball courts.

=== River Park ===
River Park is a 43-acre (170,000 m^{2}) park adjacent to Concord Park. It features a restroom facility, playground, outdoor basketball court, and borders the YMCA soccer fields. Adjacent to River Park is the Brentwood Family YMCA, now complete with a skate park.

=== Tower Park ===
Tower Park is a 47-acre (190,000 m^{2}) park north of the WSM Tower off Concord Road. It includes multi-purpose fields, natural open spaces, and jogging and biking trails. The new Williamson County Indoor Sports Complex is located here. At 76,000 square feet (7,100 m^{2}), it consists of a fifty-meter indoor pool, five indoor tennis courts, a fitness center, locker rooms, a childcare room, and a multi-purpose room.

=== Windy Hill Park ===
Windy Hill Park is a 52-acre passive park on Old Smyrna Road in northern Brentwood. The City of Brentwood purchased the land from the Sensing family in May 2020 for $5.2 million, or $100,000 per acre, to create a new park serving residents in the northern part of the city. The park opened with a ribbon-cutting ceremony on December 13, 2025.

== Economy ==
=== Top employers ===
According to the City's 2024 Annual Comprehensive Financial Report, the top employers in the city are:

#	Employer	# of Employees
1	UnitedHealth Group	3,083
2	Tractor Supply Company	2,000
3	Brookdale Senior Living	1,101
4	Comdata	1,000
5	GEODIS	733
6	DaVita HealthCare Partners Inc.	700
7	LBMC	600
8	CoreCivic	515
9	Premise Health	486
10	City of Brentwood	308

== Notable people ==
=== Actors ===
- Nepoleon Duraisamy (actor)

=== Athletes ===
- Mike Archie (NFL, Tennessee Titans)
- Jason Arnott (NHL, Nashville Predators)
- Mookie Betts (MLB, Los Angeles Dodgers)
- Keith Bulluck (NFL, Tennessee Titans)
- Andrew Bumbalough (distance runner)
- Kerry Collins (NFL, Tennessee Titans)
- Don Cooper (MLB, Chicago White Sox)
- Zack Cozart (MLB, Cincinnati Reds)
- Kamron Doyle (PBA Tour)
- Mike Fisher (NHL, Nashville Predators)
- Bill Gullickson (MLB, Detroit Tigers)
- Van Jefferson (NFL, Atlanta Falcons)
- Sean Keveren (distance runner)
- Dawson Knox (NFL, Buffalo Bills)
- Robbie Ray (MLB, San Francisco Giants)
- Lucas Patrick (NFL, Green Bay Packers)
- P.K. Subban (NHL, Nashville Predators)
- David Thornton (NFL, Tennessee Titans)
- Barry Trotz (NHL General Manager, Nashville Predators)
- Kyle Vanden Bosch (NFL, Tennessee Titans)
- Nate Washington (NFL, Tennessee Titans)
- Scott Wells (NFL, Green Bay Packers)
- Brandan Wright (NBA, Dallas Mavericks)

=== Musicians ===
- Jack White
- Trace Adkins
- Rodney Atkins
- Jessie Baylin
- Shelley Breen (Point of Grace)
- Garth Brooks
- Kix Brooks
- Luke Bryan
- Jeremy Camp
- David Cook
- Meat Loaf
- Don Moen
- Christopher Cross
- Skeeter Davis
- Little Jimmy Dickens
- Melinda Doolittle
- Nathan Followill (Kings of Leon)
- Kesha
- Dolly Parton
- Jerry Reed
- Marty Robbins
- Joe Don Rooney (Rascal Flatts)
- John Schlitt
- Hillary Scott (Lady Antebellum)
- Margo Smith
- Carrie Underwood
- Cece Winans
- Trisha Yearwood

=== Other ===
- Marsha Blackburn, US Senator
- Gwen Shamblin Lara, founder of Weigh Down and Remnant Fellowship Church
- Jamie Lynn Spears, singer and actress
- Brad Stine, comedian
- Niki Taylor, supermodel
- Norman Tolk, physicist

== Sister cities ==
Brentwood is a participant in the Sister Cities program and has a relationship with the British town of the same name.

- (United Kingdom) Brentwood, Essex, England
