= Joybound People & Pets =

Nonprofit organization in California, US

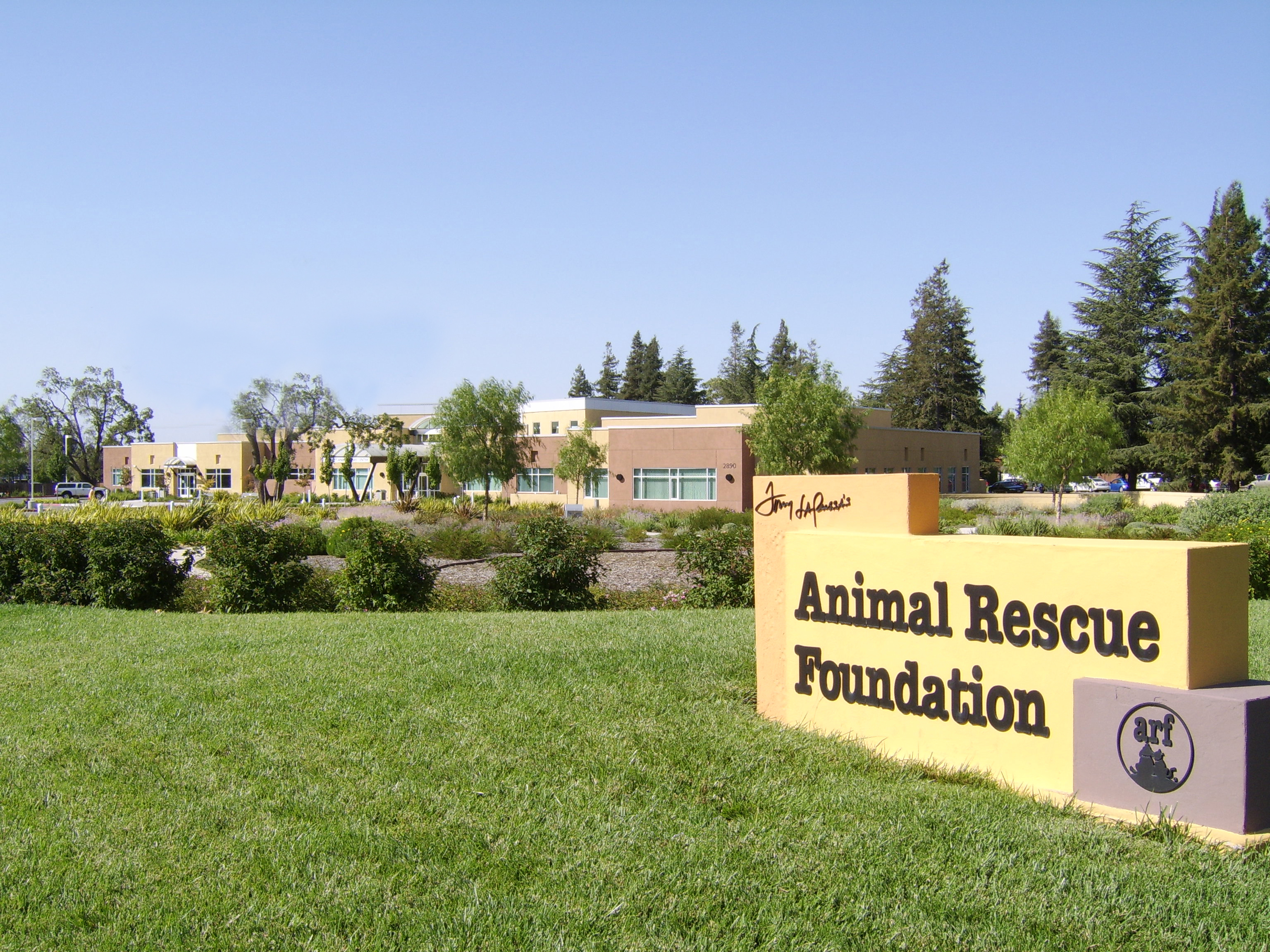
- ARF's headquarters
- Formation: June 14, 1991; 34 years ago
- Founded: 1991
- Founder: Tony La Russa and Elaine LaRussa
- Type: 501(c)(3)
- Location: Walnut Creek, California
- Key people: Susan Lee Vick, Chief Executive Officer
- Website: joybound.org
- Formerly called: Animal Rescue Foundation

Joybound People & Pets, formerly known as Tony La Russa's Animal Rescue Foundation (ARF), is a nonprofit organization founded by Elaine and Tony La Russa, based in Walnut Creek, California. Joybound rescues dogs and cats from public animal shelters where they would otherwise be euthanized and adopts them into new homes. Their programs include a spay and neuter clinic, training classes, psychiatric service dog training for military veterans, a volunteer therapy dog program, and humane education programs for children.

On May 7, 1990, during the opening game for Major League Baseball teams Oakland Athletics and the New York Yankees, a stray cat wandered onto the playing field at Oakland–Alameda County Coliseum. The game was halted as the cat ran around the field. La Russa (then manager of the A's) coaxed the cat into the dugout, and began looking for a local shelter to re-home the cat. Tony and Elaine could not find a shelter, and learned that the cat would most likely be euthanized. They decided to open their own shelter, and in February of the following year, the Animal Rescue Foundation opened.

In 2003, the organization moved to Walnut Creek, California, where it is headquartered in a 37,700 square feet (3,500 m^{2}) building. By 2015, ARF reported rescuing 30,000 cats and dogs and spaying or neutering 28,000. The organization also has therapy dogs, which had made 184,000 visits as of 2015. Five years later, in 2020, ARF reported that they had rescued 42,000 cats and dogs and spayed or neutered a similar number.
