= Don Cooper =

American baseball player and coach (1956–2026)

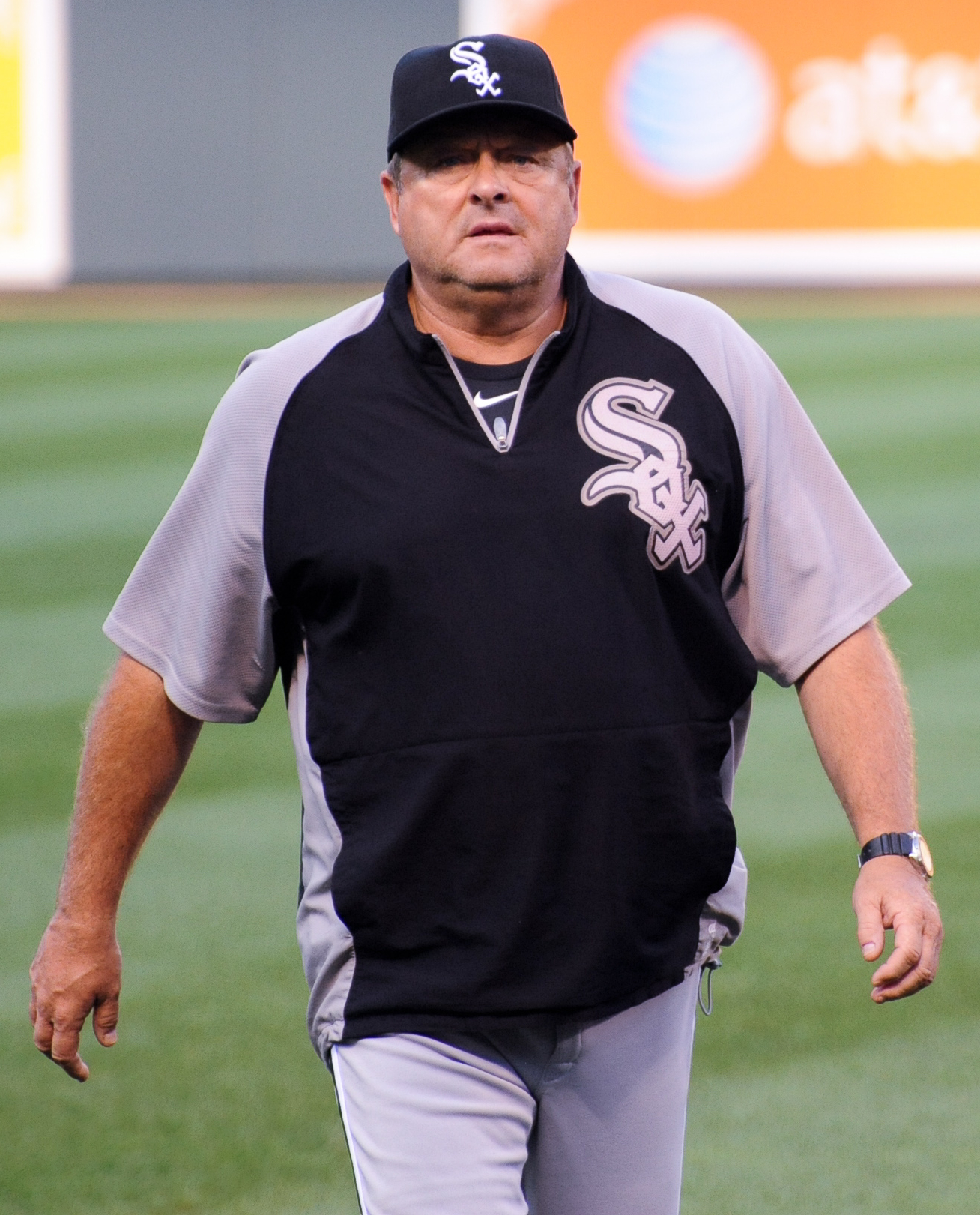
- Cooper with the Chicago White Sox in 2011
- Pitcher / Pitching coach
- Born: January 15, 1956; New York City, U.S.
- Died: September 22, 2026 (aged 70); Brentwood, Tennessee, U.S.
- Batted: Right Threw: Right

MLB debut
- April 9, 1981, for the Minnesota Twins

Last MLB appearance
- June 2, 1985, for the New York Yankees

MLB statistics
- Win–loss record: 1–6
- Earned run average: 5.27
- Strikeouts: 47
- Stats at Baseball Reference

Teams
- As player: Minnesota Twins (1981–1982); Toronto Blue Jays (1983); New York Yankees (1985); As manager: Chicago White Sox (2011); As coach: Chicago White Sox (2002–2020)

Career highlights and awards
- World Series champion (2005)

Donald James Cooper (January 15, 1956 – September 22, 2026) was an American professional baseball pitcher who spent his career in Major League Baseball (MLB) in parts of four seasons with the Minnesota Twins (1981–1982), Toronto Blue Jays (1983) and New York Yankees (1985). Cooper became the pitching coach for the Chicago White Sox from July 22, 2002. He and the White Sox won the 2005 World Series. At the end of the 2020 season, Cooper and the White Sox parted ways after 32 seasons with the organization at various levels.

== Early life ==
Donald James Cooper was born in New York City on January 15, 1956. He attended Monsignor McClancy Memorial High School (class of 1974) and the New York Institute of Technology on a college baseball and basketball scholarship.

== Playing career ==
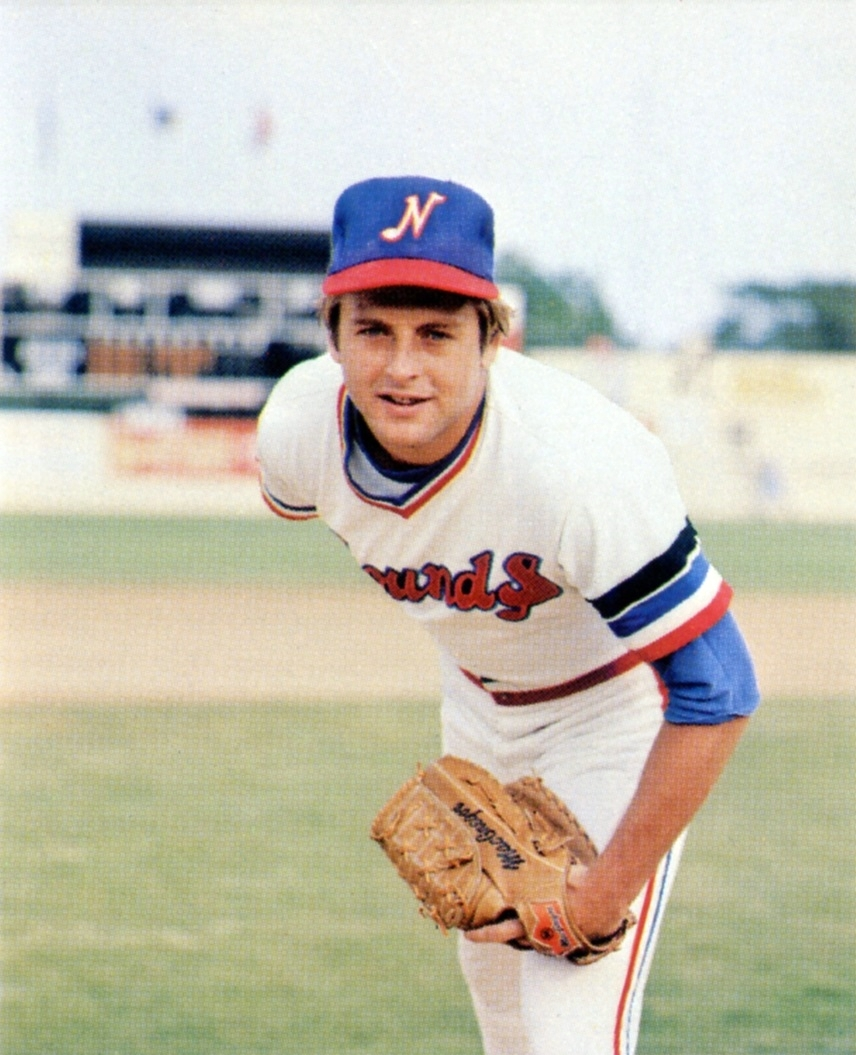
Cooper with the Nashville Sounds in 1980

Cooper was drafted by the New York Yankees in the 17th round (442nd overall) of the 1978 Major League Baseball draft. After the 1980 season, he was selected by the Minnesota Twins from the Yankees in the Rule 5 draft. He played for the Twins in 1981 and 1982, earning his only MLB win on September 2, 1982, against the Yankees. Cooper was traded to the Toronto Blue Jays for Dave Baker on December 10, 1982. On March 13, 1984, Cooper was traded to the Yankees for outfielder Derwin McNealy. Cooper signed with the Oakland Athletics for the 1986 season, appearing only in the minor leagues. In 44 MLB games (three starts) spread over four seasons, Cooper compiled a 1–6 record with a 5.27 ERA.

== Coaching career ==
Cooper worked in the White Sox organization starting in 1988, when he served as a minor league pitching coach for the Single-A South Bend Silver Hawks. He also served as pitching coach for the Single-A Advanced Sarasota White Sox from 1989 through 1991 and the Double-A Birmingham Barons in 1992. He became the White Sox minor league pitching coordinator from 1993 through 2002, aside from serving as pitching coach for the Triple-A Nashville Sounds in 1995 and 1996.

He became the White Sox pitching coach in July 2002, replacing Nardi Contreras. Under his tutelage, both Mark Buehrle and Philip Humber pitched perfect games (with the former also getting a no-hitter), Lucas Giolito pitched a no-hitter. Cooper's pitching staff had a historic run on the way to the team's World Series victory in 2005, compiling a 2.55 ERA while limiting the Boston Red Sox, Los Angeles Angels and Houston Astros to a combined .202 average during an 11–1 run to the title. In the ALCS, the White Sox pitched four consecutive complete-game victories.

With the departure of Ozzie Guillén on September 26, 2011, and Joey Cora on September 27, 2011, Cooper became the 38th manager of the White Sox, filling the role for the final two games of the 2011 season before yielding the position to Robin Ventura.

Cooper was one of the longest tenured pitching coaches in MLB. He told the Chicago Sun-Times in 2018, "I love being part of young people’s lives helping them achieve the dreams they’re dreaming about. That’s what I’m into."

Cooper, along with White Sox manager Rick Renteria, were fired on October 12, 2020, after an early playoff exit in the American League Wild Card Series against the Oakland Athletics. Upon his departure from the White Sox, Cooper was the last remaining member of the 2005 team.

Managerial record
Team	Year	Regular season					Postseason			
Team	Year	Games	Won	Lost	Win %	Finish	Won	Lost	Win %	Result
CWS	2011	2	1	1	.500	3rd in AL Central	–	–	–	–
Total		2	1	1	.500		0	0	–	

== Death ==
Cooper died at his home in Brentwood, Tennessee, on September 22, 2026, at the age of 70.

Sporting positions
Preceded by Nardi Contreras	Chicago White Sox pitching coach 2002–2020	Succeeded by Ethan Katz
