= LBMC =

LBMC Family of Companies
- Type: US private company
- Industry: Accounting
- Founded: 1984
- Products: Professional Services
- Number of employees: 1000+ (as of February 2016)
- Website: www.lbmc.com

LBMC, PC is an accounting and professional services firm with its headquarters in Brentwood, Tennessee, part of the Nashville metropolitan area.

LBMC provides audit and assurance, tax, and business advisory services, as well as additional offerings in wealth management, recruiting and staffing, technology consulting, human resources, and procurement.

LBMC employs more than 1000 people across 6 offices in the Southeastern United States, including Nashville, Chattanooga, Knoxville, and Memphis in Tennessee, as well as Louisville, Kentucky, and Charlotte, North Carolina. In 2025, the firm ranked 35th among the largest CPA firms in the United States by Inside Public Accounting, with reported net revenue of $234.6 million.

== History ==
LBMC was founded in 1984in Nashville, Tennessee, as a certified public accounting firm under the name Lattimore, Black, Morgan, and Cain, PC, by partners Jim Lattimore, Charles Black, David Morgan, and Mike Cain. LBMC provides professional services in accounting, audit, tax, and business advisory. The firm also operates several affiliated entities that offer technology consulting, wealth management, procurement, human resources outsourcing, and staffing solutions. As of 2026, James R. Meade Jr. is CEO of LBMC.

The firm expanded in the 1990s by adding business valuation, litigation support, payroll outsourcing, and information technology consulting. In 1996, it established LBMC Technologies, later renamed LBMC Technology Solutions. Growth continued through the 2000s, with the launch of healthcare consulting and risk services.

Later in the late 2010s, LBMC expanded its advisory and technology capabilities through a series of acquisitions. Accounting Today reported that the firm acquired the Tennessee-based outsourcing provider W Squared and Pivotal Bridge’s Intacct consulting practice in 2017, followed by the data-analytics firm Think Data Insights in 2019.

The company acquired Knoxville-based IT Solutions in 2005 and two Tennessee accounting firms, McWilliams & Company and Petty & Landis, in 2007.

LBMC acquired W Squared and Procurement Solutions in 2017, Think Data Insights in 2019, and the Charlotte-based InterDyn Artis in 2020. In 2021, LBMC’s cybersecurity division, CyberMaxx, was acquired by Periscope Equity.Later in 2022, The LBMC Cares Foundation was created. LBMC expanded geographically through mergers with Strothman and Company of Louisville in 2023 and Frazee Ivy Davis of Memphis in 2024.

In September 2023, Nashville Business Journal reported that CEO Jeff Drummonds stepped down after nearly a decade in the role to take on strategic growth initiatives within the organization. Jim Meade Jr., previously the firm’s chief strategy officer, was appointed as the new CEO.

In October 2023, LBMC announced a merger with Strothman & Co., a Louisville-based accounting firm with operations in Kentucky and Indiana. The deal became effective on November 1st, 2023, and marked one of LBMC’s largest expansion moves, adding more than 100 professionals and extending its physical presence into new Midwestern markets.

In 2025, the firm ranked 35th among the largest CPA firms in the United States by Inside Public Accounting, with reported net revenue of $234.6 million, and has been recognized on Forbes’ “America’s Best Tax and Accounting Firms” list and on Fortune’s Best Workplaces in Consulting & Professional Services rankings.
