= Deerwood Arboretum and Nature Area =

City park and arboretum in Brentwood, Tennessee

Coordinates: 36.03594°N 86.83972°W

The Deerwood Arboretum and Nature Area (27 acres) is a city park and arboretum located along the Little Harpeth River, Deerwood Lane, Brentwood, Tennessee. It is open daily without charge.

The arboretum was the site of the city's sewage treatment plant until the early 1980s, and converted to a park in 1992. It now includes over 60 tree species, with walking trails, outdoor classroom, restrooms, observation deck, and a small amphitheater.
