= Don Rowe =

American baseball player (1936-2005)

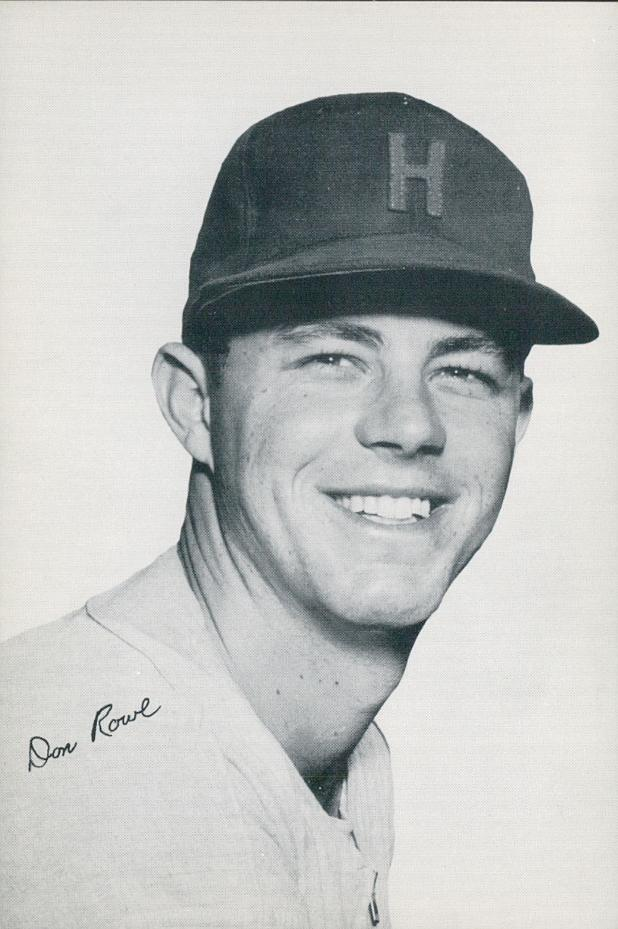
- Rowe with the Hollywood Stars c. 1957
- Pitcher
- Born: April 3, 1936; Brawley, California, U.S.
- Died: October 15, 2005 (aged 69); Newport Beach, California, U.S.
- Batted: Left Threw: Left

MLB debut
- April 9, 1963, for the New York Mets

Last MLB appearance
- July 18, 1963, for the New York Mets

MLB statistics
- Win–loss record: 0–0
- Earned run average: 4.28
- Strikeouts: 27
- Stats at Baseball Reference

Teams
- New York Mets (1963)

Donald Howard Rowe (April 3, 1936 – October 15, 2005) was an American player and pitching coach in professional baseball. A left-handed pitcher, Rowe had a 14-year professional career and spent only one partial season in Major League Baseball as a member of the 1963 New York Mets. He threw 54 2/3 innings of major league ball, the most-ever by a pitcher who never recorded a win, loss or a save.

Rowe was a native of Brawley, California, and attended Long Beach State University. He originally signed with the Pittsburgh Pirates in 1954, and in his tenth pro season, he debuted with the Mets on April 9, 1963. His final appearance was on July 18, 1963. After retiring from playing, Rowe became the pitching coach for the Chicago White Sox in 1988 (although he was forced to step aside because of ill health in June) and the Milwaukee Brewers from 1992 to 1998, and worked as a pitching coach in the farm systems of the California Angels, San Francisco Giants, White Sox and Brewers. He also coached football, baseball and tennis at Golden West College, Huntington Beach, California.

Rowe died from Parkinson's disease in Newport Beach, California, at the age of 69.

Preceded by Dick Bosman	Chicago White Sox pitching coach 1988	Succeeded by Dyar Miller
Preceded by Larry Haney	Milwaukee Brewers pitching coach 1992–1998	Succeeded by Bill Campbell
