= Tony La Russa =

American baseball player and manager (born 1944)

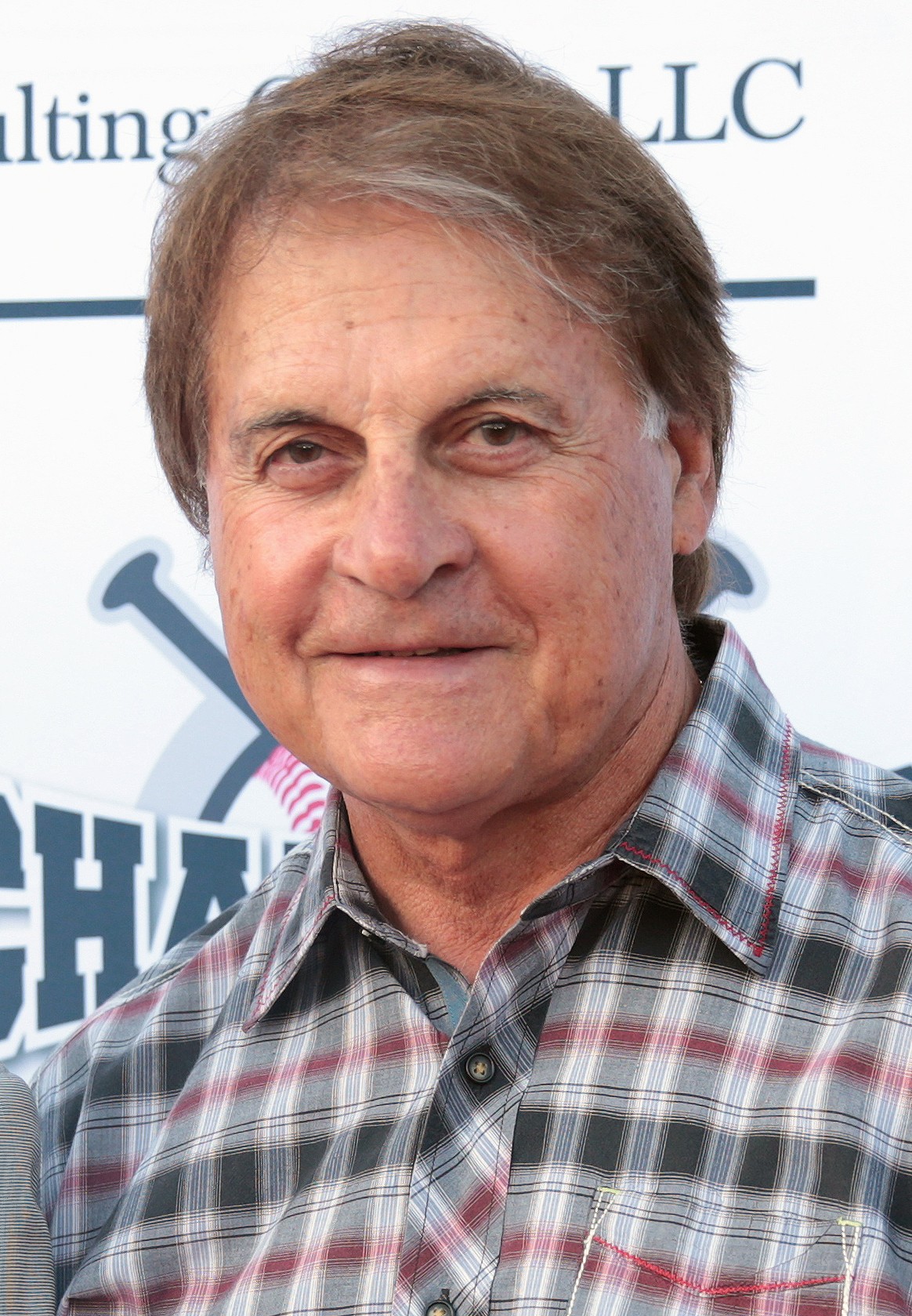
- La Russa in 2017
- Infielder / Manager
- Born: October 4, 1944 (age 82); Tampa, Florida, U.S.
- Batted: Right Threw: Right

MLB debut
- May 10, 1963, for the Kansas City Athletics

Last MLB appearance
- April 6, 1973, for the Chicago Cubs

MLB statistics
- Batting average: .199
- Runs batted in: 7
- Managerial record: 2,884–2,499–4
- Winning %: .536
- Stats at Baseball Reference
- Managerial record at Baseball Reference

Teams
- As player: Kansas City / Oakland Athletics (1963, 1968–1971); Atlanta Braves (1971); Chicago Cubs (1973); As manager: Chicago White Sox (1979–1986); Oakland Athletics (1986–1995); St. Louis Cardinals (1996–2011); Chicago White Sox (2021–2022); As coach: Chicago White Sox (1978–1979)

Career highlights and awards
- 3× World Series champion (1989, 2006, 2011); 4× Manager of the Year (1983, 1988, 1992, 2002); St. Louis Cardinals No. 10 retired; Athletics Hall of Fame; St. Louis Cardinals Hall of Fame

Member of the National

Baseball Hall of Fame
- Induction: 2014
- Vote: 100%
- Election method: Expansion Era Committee

Anthony La Russa Jr. (/ləˈruːsə/; born October 4, 1944) is an American former professional baseball infielder and manager. His Major League Baseball (MLB) career spanned from 1963 to 2022, in several roles. He is the former manager of the St. Louis Cardinals, Oakland Athletics, and Chicago White Sox. In 35 seasons as a manager, La Russa guided his teams to three World Series titles, six league championships, and 13 division titles. His managerial total of 2,884 MLB wins is second only to Connie Mack's.

As a player, La Russa made his major league debut in 1963 and spent parts of five major league seasons with the Kansas City / Oakland Athletics, Atlanta Braves, and Chicago Cubs. After a shoulder injury during the 1964–65 off-season, in 1969 he completed a Bachelor of Arts degree in Industrial Management at the University of South Florida before spending much of his career in the minor leagues and retiring in 1977. After attending courses for several years during baseball off seasons, in 1978, he completed a JD at Florida State University. La Russa was admitted to the bar in Florida in 1980, but chose to pursue management and coaching positions in baseball instead of practicing law.

Named manager of the White Sox in the middle of the 1979 season, La Russa guided the team to an American League West division title four seasons later. In the middle of the 1986 season, he was fired by the White Sox and hired less than three weeks later by the Athletics. La Russa led the A's to three consecutive American League championships from 1988 to 1990 and the 1989 World Series title. He left Oakland after the 1995 season to manage the Cardinals, whom he led to three National League championships and the 2006 and 2011 World Series titles. La Russa retired after winning the 2011 title and 34 seasons as a major league manager. Three months later, he accepted a position helping fellow former manager Joe Torre, the executive vice president for MLB operations. In 2014, he became the chief baseball officer for the Arizona Diamondbacks. In November 2019, he joined the Los Angeles Angels as a senior advisor of baseball operations. In the 2021 offseason, he was named the manager of the White Sox; he retired in 2022 due to health concerns.

In 2013, La Russa was unanimously elected to the Hall of Fame by the 16-member Veterans Committee. The induction ceremony was held at Cooperstown, New York, on July 27, 2014. On August 16, 2014, he was inducted into the St. Louis Cardinals Hall of Fame.

== Early life ==
Born in Tampa, Florida, on October 4, 1944, to Anthony and Olivia (Cuervo) La Russa, Anthony Jr.'s paternal grandparents had emigrated from Italy (Sicily) and his mother's family from Spain. He was raised in nearby Ybor City, Florida, where his parents had met while they were working in the local cigar factory.

The La Russa family moved to West Tampa, Florida, where Tony played American Legion baseball and PONY League baseball alongside teammate Lou Piniella.

After graduating from Jefferson High School in Tampa, La Russa was signed by the Kansas City Athletics in June 1962 as a middle infielder, with a clause that the Athletics pay for his college education at the University of South Florida.

== Professional playing career ==
La Russa made his major league debut with the Kansas City A's on May 10, 1963, after having played 76 games with A's affiliates Binghamton Triplets and Daytona Beach Islanders in 1962. He spent the entire 1963 season in the majors, as was required by his signing as a "bonus baby". He had suffered an off-season shoulder injury while playing softball with friends, and this limited him to only 34 games in 1963, in which he hit .250. The injured shoulder bothered him through the remainder of his playing career.

Over the next six seasons, La Russa spent most of his time in the minor leagues. He made it back up to the A's, which had since moved to Oakland, in 1968 and 1969. He spent the entire 1970 season with the A's, and then late in 1971 the A's traded him to the Atlanta Braves. His final big league playing stop was with the Chicago Cubs, where he appeared as a pinch runner in one game, on April 6, 1973, scoring the walk-off winning run. He also spent time in the organizations of the Pittsburgh Pirates, Chicago White Sox, and St. Louis Cardinals.

In total, he played 132 major-league games, 40 in the starting lineup. He went 35-for-176, for a batting average of .199. His 23 walks pushed his on-base percentage to .292. He had 7 RBI and scored 15 runs. He made 63 appearances at second base, 18 at shortstop, and two at third base, fielding .960 in 249 total chances and participating in 34 double plays.

It was as a player with the A's that La Russa first met catcher Dave Duncan, who would join his coaching staff in Chicago in 1983. The two worked together on every La Russa-managed team thereafter, and he often credits Duncan as playing a key role in his success.

== Managerial career ==
=== Early career ===
Having started coursework following his A's signing in 1962, La Russa completed a degree in Industrial Management at the University of South Florida in 1969; followed by a JD at Florida State University College of Law in 1978. and was admitted to the Florida Bar on July 30, 1980. He is associated with a Sarasota law firm although he is not eligible to practice at this time. La Russa has been quoted as saying, "I decided I'd rather ride the buses in the minor leagues than practice law for a living." Shortly before graduating from FSU College of Law, La Russa spoke with one of his professors about his post-graduation plans, indicating to his professor that he had an opportunity to coach in the minor leagues and asking his professor what he should do. La Russa's professor responded, "Grow up, you're an adult now, you're going to be a lawyer."

Other major league managers in baseball history who have graduated from law school or passed a state bar exam, include: James Henry O'Rourke (Buffalo Bisons, 1881–84, Washington Senators, 1893), John Montgomery Ward (New York Giants, Brooklyn and Providence, late 1800s), Hughie Jennings (Detroit, 1907–20, New York Giants, 1924), Miller Huggins (St. Louis Cardinals and New York Yankees, 1913–29), Muddy Ruel (St. Louis Browns, 1947), Jack Hendricks (St. Louis Cardinals, 1918, Cincinnati, 1924–29), and Branch Rickey (St. Louis Browns, 1913–15, St. Louis Cardinals, 1919–25).

=== Chicago White Sox (1979–1986) ===
La Russa credits Loren Babe and Paul Richards of the White Sox organization for helping him to become a manager. The White Sox gave La Russa his first managerial opportunity in 1978 by naming him skipper of their Double-A affiliate, the Knoxville Sox of the Southern League. La Russa spent a half-season at Knoxville before being promoted to the White Sox coaching staff when owner Bill Veeck changed managers from Bob Lemon to Larry Doby. Doby was fired at the end of the season; Don Kessinger, former star shortstop of the crosstown Cubs, was named the White Sox' player-manager for 1979, and La Russa was named manager of the Triple-A Iowa Oaks of the American Association, choosing to manage in the minors after the White Sox had offered him his same major league coaching role.

The White Sox fired Kessinger with a 46–60 record two-thirds of the way through the 1979 season and replaced him with La Russa. The White Sox played .500 baseball (27–27) for the rest of the 1979 campaign. LaRussa, at 34, was the youngest manager in the major leagues. La Russa was named American League Manager of the Year in 1983, when his club won the AL West but fell to the Baltimore Orioles in the American League Championship Series.

The White Sox fired La Russa after the club got off to a 26–38 start in 1986. In 1986, general manager Roland Hemond, who had hired La Russa as White Sox manager, was replaced by the White Sox' broadcaster Ken Harrelson as general manager. Harrelson then fired both La Russa and coach Dave Duncan during the season. Ironically, Harrelson and La Russa were teammates at Binghamton in 1962. In later years, White Sox Owner Jerry Reinsdorf expressed regret for allowing La Russa to be fired. La Russa finished his first White Sox career with a 522–510 regular season record and a 1–3 postseason record, but added another 156–134 record in 2021–2022. Decades later, Hemond said of La Russa: "Tony La Russa is one of the most brilliant managers that I ever encountered in my baseball career. He saw things other people didn't see. There were some managers who thought he was out of line with what he was trying to do, but later on they had to respect him because it was working. There's no question he changed the way the game is played." La Russa is also commonly credited for the advent of the modern specialized bullpen.

=== Oakland Athletics (1986–1995) ===
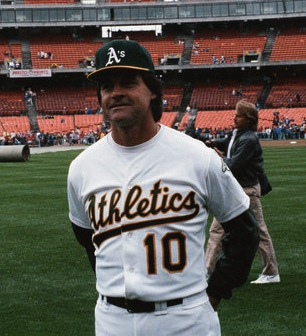
La Russa with the Oakland A's in 1989

La Russa had a break of less than three weeks before his old club, the Athletics, called him to take over as manager. La Russa and Duncan both joined the A's, inheriting a team that was 31–52 and in 7th place. They went 45–34 the rest of the season to finish in 3rd place in 1986.

La Russa managed the Oakland A's to three consecutive American League Pennants and World Series appearances from 1988 to 1990. The A's lost the 1988 World Series to manager Tommy Lasorda and the Los Angeles Dodgers. The following year, the A's swept the earthquake-delayed Bay Area 1989 World Series against the San Francisco Giants. In their third consecutive appearance, the favored A's faced manager Lou Piniella, LaRussa's childhood teammate and friend, and his Cincinnati Reds in the 1990 World Series. The A's were swept in the series. In both 1988 and 1990 the A's had swept the Boston Red Sox 4–0 in the ALCS, after winning 100 and 99 games respectively. The 1988 World Series was made famous by the Kirk Gibson game-winning home run off of A's closer Dennis Eckersley. La Russa earned two American League Manager of the Year awards with the A's, in 1988 and 1992, giving him three AL awards, the latter after again winning the Western Division.

After the 1995 season, in which the A's finished 67–77, the Haas family, with whom La Russa had a close personal relationship, sold the team after the death of patriarch Walter A. Haas, Jr. In the off-season, La Russa left Oakland to take over for the fired Joe Torre as manager of the St. Louis Cardinals. La Russa had a 798–673 regular season record and a 19–13 postseason record with Oakland.

=== St. Louis Cardinals (1996–2011) ===
In his first campaign with the Cardinals in 1996, the team clinched the National League Central division title (and also finished National League runner-up), a feat his clubs repeated in 2000, 2001, 2002, 2004, 2005, 2006, and 2009. The Cardinals also tied for the National League Central crown with the Houston Astros in 2001. In 2002, La Russa became the first manager to win the Manager of the Year award four times. His fourth award was arguably the most emotional; La Russa led the Cardinals to the National League Championship Series (where they ultimately lost in five games to the San Francisco Giants) in a year in which the Cardinals were traumatized by the deaths of beloved Hall of Fame broadcaster Jack Buck and 33-year-old pitcher Darryl Kile just four days later. On September 10, 2003, he won his 2,000th career game as a manager against the Colorado Rockies, becoming the seventh to reach the mark in Major League Baseball.

The 2004 team played one of the finest seasons in Cardinals' history, as they won 105 games. After a regular season in which the Cardinals led the NL in runs scored (855) while allowing the fewest (659), La Russa's Cardinals defeated the Los Angeles Dodgers in the National League Division Series, 3 games to 1. St. Louis then took on the Houston Astros in the National League Championship Series. In a tense series with opposing pitcher Roger Clemens at the top of his game, Cardinals third baseman Scott Rolen hit a game-winning two-run home run off Clemens in Game 7 following Jim Edmonds' rally saving catch. This home run sent the Cardinals to the World Series for the first time since 1987. However, they were swept in four games by a historic Boston Red Sox team that had just surmounted a 3–0 deficit against the New York Yankees and captured their first championship since 1918.

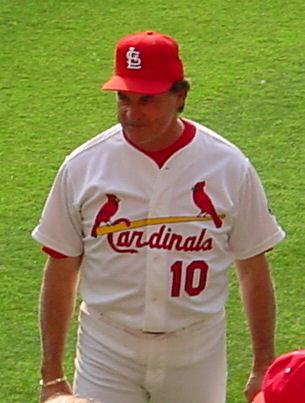
Tony La Russa on the outfield warning track at Busch Stadium on June 29, 2002.

In 2006, the Cardinals returned to the World Series, this time with a 4–1 victory over the Detroit Tigers. The team's 83–78 regular season record is the worst ever by an eventual World Series champion, usurping the 1987 Minnesota Twins' 85–77 campaign. La Russa became the second manager to win a World Series in both the American League and National League – a distinction shared with his mentor Sparky Anderson.

When he came to St. Louis, La Russa wore number 10 to symbolize the team's drive to their 10th championship and pay tribute to Anderson, who wore number 10 while manager of the Cincinnati Reds. After winning the championship, he chose to continue wearing number 10 to pay tribute to Anderson.

La Russa led the Cardinals to the 2011 World Series, after defeating the Philadelphia Phillies in the NLDS (3–2), and then the Milwaukee Brewers in the NLCS (4–2). The Cardinals defeated the Texas Rangers in Game 7 of the World Series to win the franchise's 11th World Championship, and the third of La Russa's managerial career. He passed Bobby Cox for 2nd place on the all-time postseason wins list with his 68th win in Game 3. Three days following the World Series win, La Russa announced his retirement, ranking second all-time in postseason wins with 70, third all-time with 2,728 regular season wins, second with 5,097 games managed, and second with 33 years (tied) managing with John McGraw. He finished his Cardinals career with a 1408–1182 regular season record and 50–42 postseason record.

La Russa also became the first manager in Major League Baseball history to retire in the same season after winning a World Series title. Even though he had retired, La Russa managed the National League All Stars in the 2012 MLB All-Star Game for the final time as a member of the Cardinals. The National League won 8–0.

=== Return to Chicago White Sox (2021–2022) ===
After serving in various executive roles for MLB and for several teams, La Russa was announced as the manager of the White Sox on October 29, 2020, replacing Rick Renteria. At 76, La Russa became the oldest manager in MLB. He also became the first manager in baseball history to return to managing after being elected to the National Baseball Hall of Fame as a manager. (Connie Mack was elected in 1937, before his retirement). A. J. Hinch was known to be another finalist, but was hired by the Detroit Tigers instead when the White Sox decided on La Russa.

On June 6, 2021, La Russa passed John McGraw for second place in all-time managerial wins. La Russa led the White Sox to their first AL Central division title since 2008; it was La Russa's 13th division title as a manager. They lost to the Houston Astros in the 2021 ALDS in four games.

In 2022, at 77 years of age, La Russa was the oldest manager in major league baseball, four years older than Dusty Baker. The 2022 season proved to be a tough one for both the White Sox and La Russa. On June 9, La Russa faced criticism for a late-game decision that backfired on him. The White Sox were trailing 7–5 to the Los Angeles Dodgers and the Dodgers had a runner on second base in the top of the 6th inning. With a count of 1–2 on Trea Turner, La Russa issued an intentional walk on Turner to send him to first base. The decision immediately backfired as the next batter, Max Muncy, hit a home run just a few pitches later that made the score 10–5 in an eventual win for the Dodgers. La Russa defended his decision saying "that wasn't a tough call" and that he would do it again. A month later, La Russa did in fact do it again on August 19 against the Cleveland Guardians, when he issued an intentional walk on Oscar González with a 1–2 count, this time down by three runs in the bottom of the 7th, although it did not result in a subsequent home run. On August 30, La Russa, under the advice of a cardiologist he had seen about his heart, elected to not manage the impending game versus Kansas City. The next day, he went further testing and received an advisement to see a heart specialist. On that same day, the White Sox announced that La Russa was out indefinitely, with bench coach Miguel Cairo taking over as interim manager. At that point, the White Sox were 63–65. On October 3, La Russa announced that he was retiring effective immediately.

=== Managerial record ===
As of games played on August 26, 2022.

Team	Year	Regular season					Postseason			
Team	Year	Games	Won	Lost	Win %	Finish	Won	Lost	Win %	Result
CWS	1979	54	27	27	.500	5th in AL West	–	–	–	–
CWS	1980	160	70	90	.438	5th in AL West	–	–	–	–
CWS	1981	106	54	52	.509	3rd in AL West	–	–	–	–
CWS	1982	162	87	75	.537	3rd in AL West	–	–	–	–
CWS	1983	162	99	63	.611	1st in AL West	1	3	.250	Lost ALCS (BAL)
CWS	1984	162	74	88	.457	5th in AL West	–	–	–	–
CWS	1985	162	85	77	.525	3rd in AL West	–	–	–	–
CWS	1986	64	26	38	.406	Fired	–	–	–	–
OAK	1986	79	45	34	.570	3rd in AL West	–	–	–	–
OAK	1987	162	81	81	.500	3rd in AL West	–	–	–	–
OAK	1988	162	104	58	.642	1st in AL West	5	4	.556	Lost World Series (LAD)
OAK	1989	162	99	63	.611	1st in AL West	8	1	.889	Won World Series (SF)
OAK	1990	162	103	59	.636	1st in AL West	4	4	.500	Lost World Series (CIN)
OAK	1991	162	84	78	.519	4th in AL West	–	–	–	–
OAK	1992	162	96	66	.593	1st in AL West	2	4	.333	Lost ALCS (TOR)
OAK	1993	162	68	94	.420	7th in AL West	–	–	–	–
OAK	1994	114	51	63	.447	2nd in AL West	–	–	–	–
OAK	1995	144	67	77	.465	4th in AL West	–	–	–	–
OAK total		1,471	798	673	.542		19	13	.594	
STL	1996	162	88	74	.543	1st in NL Central	6	4	.600	Lost NLCS (ATL)
STL	1997	162	73	89	.451	4th in NL Central	–	–	–	–
STL	1998	162	83	79	.512	3rd in NL Central	–	–	–	–
STL	1999	161	75	86	.466	4th in NL Central	–	–	–	–
STL	2000	162	95	67	.586	1st in NL Central	4	4	.500	Lost NLCS (NYM)
STL	2001	162	93	69	.574	2nd in NL Central	2	3	.400	Lost NLDS (ARI)
STL	2002	162	97	65	.599	1st in NL Central	4	4	.500	Lost NLCS (SF)
STL	2003	162	85	77	.525	3rd in NL Central	–	–	–	–
STL	2004	162	105	57	.648	1st in NL Central	7	8	.467	Lost World Series (BOS)
STL	2005	162	100	62	.617	1st in NL Central	5	4	.556	Lost NLCS (HOU)
STL	2006	161	83	78	.516	1st in NL Central	11	5	.688	Won World Series (DET)
STL	2007	162	78	84	.481	3rd in NL Central	–	–	–	–
STL	2008	162	86	76	.531	4th in NL Central	–	–	–	–
STL	2009	162	91	71	.562	1st in NL Central	0	3	.000	Lost NLDS (LAD)
STL	2010	162	86	76	.531	2nd in NL Central	–	–	–	–
STL	2011	162	90	72	.556	2nd in NL Central	11	7	.611	Won World Series (TEX)
STL total		2,591	1,408	1,182	.544		50	42	.543	
CWS	2021	162	93	69	.574	1st in AL Central	1	3	.250	Lost ALDS (HOU)
CWS	2022	128	63	65	.492	3rd in AL Central	–	–	–	–
CWS total		1,322	678	644	.513		2	6	.250	
Total		5,387	2,884	2,499	.536		71	61	.538	

== Executive career ==
Shortly after his retirement from the playing field, La Russa took a position with MLB assisting former managerial rival Joe Torre in matters of on-field discipline. He held this position for more than two seasons.

On May 17, 2014, La Russa accepted a position as Chief Baseball Officer for the Arizona Diamondbacks to oversee the entire baseball operations department.

After joining the Diamondbacks in 2014, La Russa was reunited with former assistants Duncan and McKay, and the general manager who hired him to manage the White Sox in 1979, Roland Hemond. On December 4, 2015, the Diamondbacks agreed to a six-year contract with free agent pitcher Zack Greinke worth a total of $206.5 million. At that time, it held the highest annual average value in MLB, exceeding $34.4 million per year, and was also the largest contract by total value in team history. La Russa was demoted to Chief Baseball Analyst/Advisor with the Diamondbacks following a disappointing 93-loss season in 2016, which also resulted in the firing of general manager Dave Stewart and manager Chip Hale. Following the 2017 season, La Russa resigned.

In November 2017, the Boston Red Sox announced that La Russa had joined the team as vice president and special assistant to Dave Dombrowski, the president of baseball operations. In making the announcement, the Red Sox indicated that La Russa would assist with player development, serve as an advisor to the team's coaches at the major and minor league levels, and serve as a consultant for Alex Cora, the team's major league manager. La Russa worked with the Red Sox for two seasons, and after Dombrowski was released by the Red Sox during the 2019 season, the Los Angeles Angels hired La Russa as senior adviser for baseball operations in November 2019. In 2023, he returned to the White Sox as an advisor.

== Legacy ==
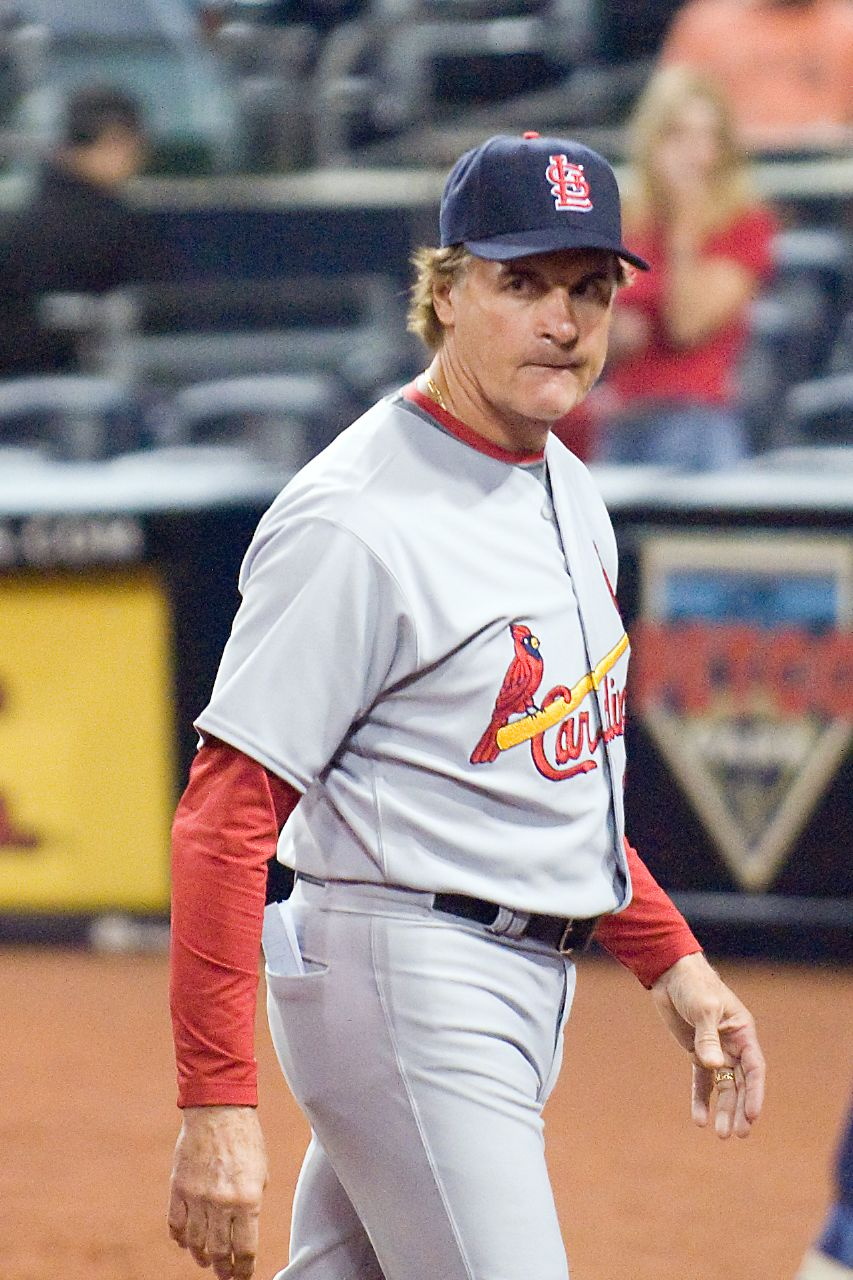
La Russa in 2008

La Russa is second in major league history in victories as a manager (2,884), trailing only Connie Mack (3,731) and surpassing John McGraw (2,763) on June 6, 2021. He managed 5,097 games, joining Mack as the second manager or coach in American sports history to reach 5,000 games. In 2004, he became the sixth manager in history to win pennants with both American and National League teams; in 2006 he became the first manager ever to win multiple pennants in both leagues and the second manager to win the World Series in both leagues. La Russa has also joined Mack as the second manager to win World Series titles in three decades and to win pennants in four. He is one of only four managers to be named Manager of the Year in both of baseball's major leagues.

La Russa is the winningest manager in St. Louis Cardinals history, with 1,408 wins and 1,182 losses (.544) and one tie, managing the Cardinals from 1996 to 2011. He was 522–510–3 (.506) with the Chicago White Sox 1979–1986, leading the club to its first postseason appearance in 24 years in 1983, and 798–673 (.542) with the Oakland Athletics 1986–1995, winning three consecutive AL pennants from 1988 to 1990; he also holds the record for victories by an Athletics manager since the franchise relocated to Oakland in 1968.

La Russa became the leader in wins by Cardinals' managers on August 31, 2007, when the Cardinals defeated the Cincinnati Reds 8–5, passing Red Schoendienst (1,041–955) to take the title. He managed his 2,500th win against the Royals at Kansas City on June 21, 2009, becoming only the third manager to attain that win level after Mack and McGraw.

Tony La Russa's number 10 was retired by the St. Louis Cardinals in 2012.

After the retirement of Atlanta Braves manager Bobby Cox in 2010, La Russa was the longest tenured manager in Major League Baseball, and with the resignation of longtime NBA head coach Jerry Sloan from the Utah Jazz on February 10, 2011, La Russa had been the longest tenured bench boss among all the Big Four sports leagues, until his retirement following his 2011 World Series victory with the Cardinals.

La Russa became eligible as a candidate for the Baseball Hall of Fame in 2013 through voting by the Expansion Era Committee for induction in 2014. On November 4, 2013, La Russa's inclusion on the Expansion Era ballot was announced with fellow former Cardinals Ted Simmons, Joe Torre and Dan Quisenberry. The Baseball Writers' Association of America's Historical Overview Committee listed the candidates on the ballot and voted the following December 8. La Russa was inducted into the 2014 Hall of Fame class as a manager.

In January 2014, the Cardinals announced La Russa among 22 former players and personnel to be inducted into the St. Louis Cardinals Hall of Fame for the inaugural class of 2014.

In 2012, he became the second manager to manage the All-Star Game (2012) after retiring since John McGraw in 1933. With his All-Star Game 8–0 win in Kansas City, he became the first manager to win an All-Star Game in both leagues.

Championships earned or shared
Title	Times	Dates	Ref
American League champion	3	1988, 1989, 1990	
National League champion	3	2004, 2006, 2011	
World Series champion	3	1989, 2006, 2011	

== Personal life ==
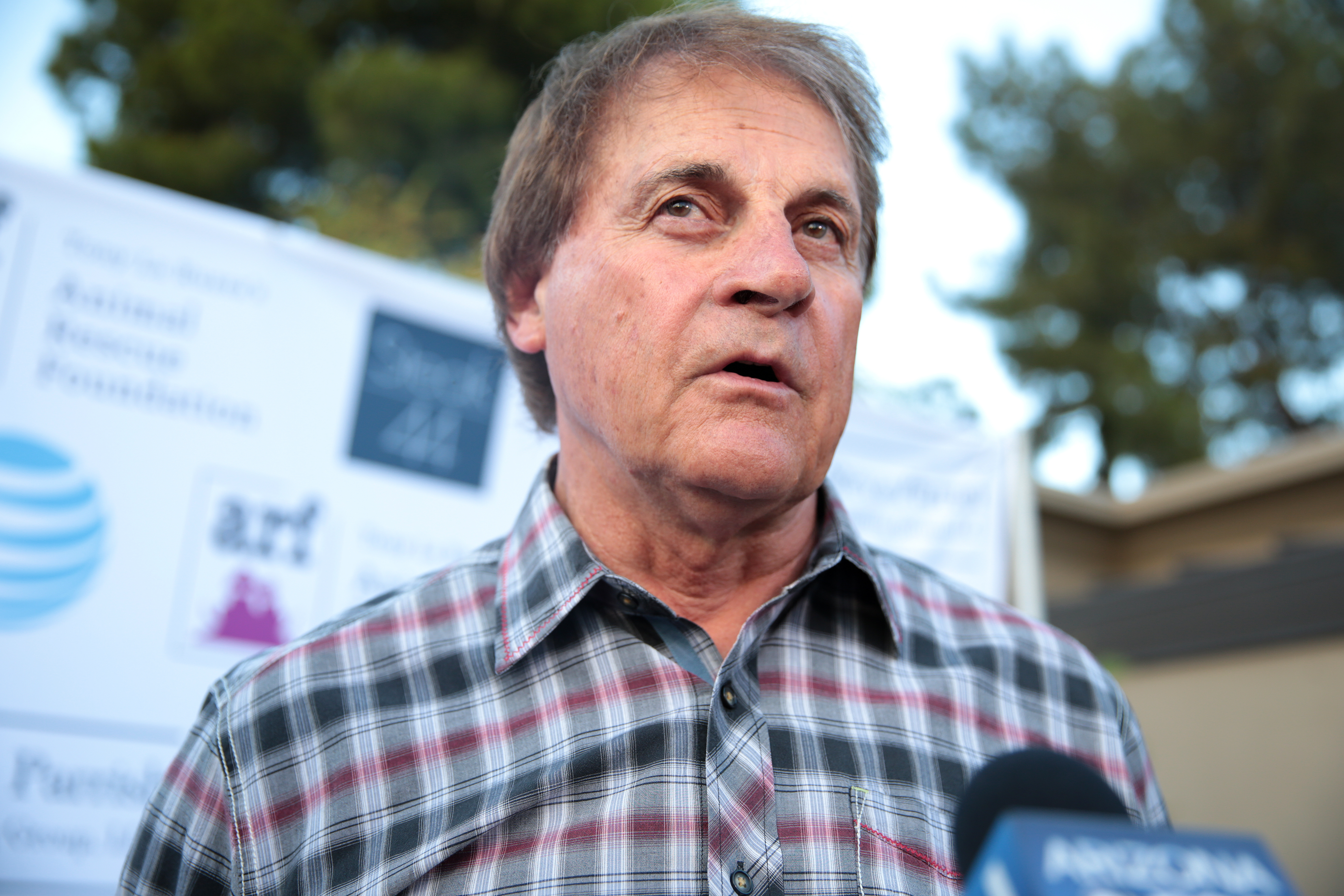
La Russa at a fundraiser for the Animal Rescue Foundation in Phoenix, Arizona, in March 2017

La Russa and his second wife, Elaine, are the founders of Tony La Russa's Animal Rescue Foundation, headquartered in Walnut Creek, California, which saves abandoned and injured animals as well as running programs to bring dogs and cats to abused children, hospital patients, seniors and shut-ins. La Russa is a vegetarian. The La Russas have two daughters, Bianca and Devon, and reside in Alamo, California.

La Russa has two older daughters, Andrea and Averie, from his first marriage to Luzette Sarcone. La Russa and Sarcone divorced in 1973 and Sarcone received full custody of their daughters. La Russa married Elaine Coker shortly after his divorce to Sarcone became official.

La Russa is also personal friends with celebrities outside the sports world, such as pianist and songwriter Bruce Hornsby, Bruce Springsteen, jazz bassist Christian McBride, and heavy metal musician Robb Flynn from the band Machine Head. In 2007, at a concert in San Francisco on La Russa's birthday, Hornsby played a comedic song he named "Hooray For Tony". The original song, titled "Hooray For Tom", is La Russa's favorite Hornsby song. In the "Hooray For Tony" version, Hornsby mentions the "Bash Brothers" Mark McGwire and José Canseco (from La Russa's days as the manager of the Oakland A's), Albert Pujols, Jim Edmonds, ARF, and La Russa's World Series Championships.

La Russa is a graduate of the University of South Florida (Bachelor of Arts in industrial management, 1969) and the Florida State University College of Law (Juris Doctor, 1978).

La Russa has Italian and Spanish ancestry, and speaks fluent Spanish. His father's parents were migrants from the Italian island of Sicily and his mother's family originated from Spain. Having a father who could speak Spanish and Italian and a mother who could speak Spanish, La Russa claimed in a 2008 interview that "Spanish was my first language". He was inducted into the National Italian American Sports Hall of Fame in 1998. La Russa was also inducted into the Hispanic Heritage Baseball Museum Hall of Fame on April 11, 2008, in a pregame ceremony at AT&T Park.

La Russa and his family had an uncredited extra role in the film Angels in the Outfield. The La Russas also made an appearance in an episode of Housecat Housecall, a reality show on Animal Planet presented by Purina Cat Chow, during the show's third season, which began on June 5, 2010. In 1980, La Russa appeared as a contestant on the game show To Tell The Truth, and helped fool the celebrity panel.

In June 2010, La Russa was asked about a tea party protest taking place during his game against the Arizona Diamondbacks that criticized the Diamondbacks' position against the controversial new Arizona immigration statute. La Russa expressed support for the Tea Partiers' right to free speech to protest at the ballpark. He also stated, "I'm actually a supporter of what Arizona is doing... you know if people don't fix their problems they have to take care of it themselves".

La Russa and Pujols attended Glenn Beck's "Restoring Honor" rally on August 28, 2010, in Washington, D.C., while the Cardinals were in town for a series against the Washington Nationals. La Russa decided to attend after being told by Beck that the rally was not political in nature.

Throughout the 2011 season, La Russa struggled with shingles. He originally disclosed that it was conjunctivitis, however, on May 10, after a visit to the Mayo Clinic (Scottsdale, Arizona), he disclosed that he was dealing with a case of shingles, and had to take off a few days for treatment and rest. Because bench coach Joe Pettini was named 'acting manager' instead of 'interim manager', La Russa was credited for all wins and losses during his absence.

On June 4, 2009, the St. Louis Post-Dispatch reported that La Russa had sued the online social network platform Twitter the previous month for a fake page established under his name on the site. La Russa claimed that he had "suffered significant emotional distress (and) damage to reputation" because of the profile. The fake profile made several "distasteful references" to La Russa and his team, according to the suit. Twitter's terms of service forbids impersonation directly, stating that users "may not impersonate others through the Twitter service in a manner that does or is intended to mislead, confuse, or deceive others." Reports that Twitter had settled ("the first celebrity lawsuit against the 32-million-user site", according to the Wall Street Journal) were rebuffed on the official Twitter blog. La Russa eventually filed a request to dismiss the suit, while Twitter, whether in regard to the suit or not, continued improving its privacy protections.

In May 2014, La Russa served as the Washington University in St. Louis commencement speaker.

=== Legal issues ===
On March 22, 2007, La Russa was arrested in Jupiter, Florida, for suspicion of driving under the influence of alcohol. He was found asleep at the wheel of his running SUV with the car in park at an intersection. He was booked at the Palm Beach County Jail and blew a .093 blood alcohol content, above the legal limit of .08. Calling his arrest on the DUI charge an "embarrassment", La Russa apologized to "anyone who is close to me, members of the Cardinals organization, our fans." He was defended by the organization and some players, such as Albert Pujols. On November 28, 2007, La Russa pleaded guilty to DUI, saying that it was in the best interest of all concerned. In a statement released by his attorney, La Russa said, "I accept full responsibility for my conduct, and assure everyone that I have learned a very valuable lesson and that this will never occur again".

In February 2020, La Russa was charged with DUI again, this time in Phoenix; the case was filed on October 28, 2020, a day before he was rehired by the White Sox.

=== Health ===
By 2022, his last season as a manager, La Russa was diagnosed with cancer, and had lingering issues with his pacemaker.

== In other media ==
In 1980, La Russa appeared as the subject in a round of the Robin Ward-hosted version of To Tell The Truth. Panelist Nipsey Russell seemed perplexed that there was another Chicago baseball team besides the Cubs. One of the imposters before the panel, when queried as to who was his best player at the moment, swiftly responded Todd Cruz. This resulted in him receiving votes. But he did not completely stump the panel.

In 2012, La Russa released his New York Times bestselling memoir, One Last Strike, which recounts his legendary last season as manager of the St. Louis Cardinals and their remarkable journey to becoming the 2011 World Series Champions from ten and a half games back.

In 2005, La Russa was the focus of a book by sportswriter Buzz Bissinger. Bissinger's Three Nights in August delves into La Russa's role as manager during a 3-game series in 2003 between his Cardinals and manager Dusty Baker's Chicago Cubs, their longtime rivals. The book received much praise from both fans and critics, though some complained that Bissinger sets out to glorify La Russa's "old school" managerial style as a direct challenge to the statistical analysis theses of Michael Lewis's 2004 book Moneyball.

As David Leonhardt of The New York Times wrote of the "stats vs. hunches" debate in an August 29, 2005 piece, "what makes this fight truly comparable to those that periodically roil the world of art history or foreign policy is that the differences between the sides are not as great as the sniping between them suggests. La Russa spends much of his time jotting down information on index cards and studying statistics in his office."

George Will's book Men at Work likewise depicted La Russa and his long-time pitching coach Dave Duncan as making more use of statistical analysis than any other team in the major leagues (this book was published in 1990, more than a decade before the Moneyball revolution).

La Russa also provided the AI for a series of successful video games, Tony La Russa Baseball (1991–1997). The games won numerous awards and featured "new" statistics selected with La Russa (and provided by prominent sabermetrics authors John Thorn and Pete Palmer) as tools for players as they managed their teams.

== See also ==
- List of Chicago White Sox award winners and league leaders
- List of Major League Baseball managers with most career ejections
- List of Major League Baseball managers with most career wins
- List of St. Louis Cardinals team records
- St. Louis Cardinals Hall of Fame and Museum
