= Norman Tolk =

American physicist and musician (1938–2026)

Norman Henry Tolk (January 9, 1938 – June 20, 2026) was an American physicist and musician.

== Life ==
Tolk was born in Idaho Falls, Idaho. He grew up in a Mormon and Protestant family. He majored in physics at Harvard College, graduating in 1960, and earned his Ph.D. in atomic physics from Columbia University in 1966. Recently he was a Professor of Physics and Astronomy at Vanderbilt University. For all his life Tolk has been a Mormon. His daughter-in-law is Astrid S. Tuminez, president of Utah Valley University. Tolk died on June 20, 2026, at the age of 88.

== Physics ==
Ever since second grade, Tolk wanted to become a physicist. After earning his degrees at Columbia and Harvard, he worked at AT&T Bell Laboratories in New Jersey. He brought the Free-electron laser to Vanderbilt. In 1987, he got the Alexander von Humboldt Award and as a result researched at Free University of Berlin.
