= List of Chicago White Sox managers =

The Chicago White Sox is a U.S. professional baseball team based in Chicago, Illinois. The White Sox are members of the American League Central Division in Major League Baseball. In baseball, the head coach of a team is called the manager, or more formally, the field manager. The duties of the team manager include team strategy and leadership on and off the field. Since the inception of the team in 1901, it has employed 44 different managers. The team's current manager is Will Venable, who was promoted on October 31, 2024.

The franchise's first major league manager was Hall of Famer Clark Griffith, who managed the team for two seasons and led them to the American League championship in their inaugural season. Fielder Jones, who managed the team from 1904 to 1908, led the team to its second American League championship and its first World Series championship (no World Series was played in 1901), defeating the White Sox's crosstown rivals, the Chicago Cubs, in the 1906 World Series. Pants Rowland and Kid Gleason managed the White Sox to American League championships in 1917 and 1919, respectively, with the White Sox winning the 1917 World Series but losing the 1919 World Series in the infamous Black Sox scandal. The White Sox did not win another American League championship until 1959, with Al López as their manager. The White Sox lost the 1959 World Series to the Los Angeles Dodgers. The White Sox next captured the American League pennant in 2005 and, with Ozzie Guillén as their manager, defeated the Houston Astros in the 2005 World Series.

The longest–tenured White Sox manager was Jimmy Dykes, who managed the team for 1,850 games from 1934 to 1946. The only other White Sox managers who have managed more than 1,000 games are Lopez with 1,495, Guillén with 1,135, and Tony La Russa with 1,359. Dykes' 899 wins and 940 losses also lead all White Sox managers. Jones' winning percentage of .592 is the highest of any White Sox manager. Five White Sox managers have served multiple terms managing the team. Nixey Callahan was the White Sox manager in 1903 and part of 1904, and then again from 1912 to 1914. Johnny Evers served two terms as manager, separated by a bout of appendicitis in 1924. Eddie Collins served as interim manager for 27 games in 1924 season while Evers was ill and then served as the full–time manager in 1925 and 1926. Lopez served three terms as manager: the first from 1957 to 1965; then for 11 games during the 1968 season, before being hospitalized with appendicitis; and then returning for another 53 games from the end of the 1968 season through the beginning of the 1969 season. Les Moss served as interim manager for two games in 1968, replacing Eddie Stanky before being replaced by Lopez. After Lopez was hospitalized later that season, Moss took over as manager again for 34 games before Lopez returned. Hall of Famer Frank Chance was hired to manage the team for the 1924 but illness forced him to retire before managing any games. Eleven Hall of Famers have managed the White Sox: Griffith, Hugh Duffy, Collins, Evers, Ed Walsh, Ray Schalk, Ted Lyons, Lopez, Bob Lemon Larry Doby and Tony La Russa. Lopez and La Russa were elected as manager; the others were elected as players.

== Key ==
#	A running total of the number of White Sox managers. Any manager who has two or more separate terms is counted only once.
G	Regular season games managed; may not equal sum of wins and losses due to tied games
W	Regular season wins
L	Regular season losses
Win%	Winning percentage
PA	Playoff appearances: number of years this manager has led the franchise to the playoffs
PW	Playoff wins
PL	Playoff losses
Ref(s)	Reference(s)
LC	League championships: number of league championships, or pennants, achieved by the manager
WS	World Series championships: number of World Series victories achieved by the manager
†	Inducted into the Baseball Hall of Fame as a manager
*	Inducted into the Baseball Hall of Fame as a player

== Managers ==
Statistics current through 2026 season

#	Image	Manager	Seasons	G	W	L	Win%	PA	PW	PL	LC	WS	Ref(s)
1		Clark Griffith*	1901–1902	275	157	113	.581	—	—	—	1	—	
2		Nixey Callahan	1903–1904	180	83	95	.474	—	—	—	—	—	
3		Fielder Jones	1904–1908	739	426	293	.592	1	4	2	1	1	
4		Billy Sullivan	1909	159	78	74	.513	—	—	—	—	—	
5		Hugh Duffy*	1910–1911	310	145	159	.477	—	—	—	—	—	
—		Nixey Callahan	1912–1914	467	226	234	.491	—	—	—	—	—	
6		Pants Rowland	1915–1918	591	339	247	.578	1	4	2	1	1	
7		Kid Gleason	1919–1923	759	392	364	.519	1	3	5	1	0	
8		Johnny Evers*	1924	21	10	11	.476	—	—	—	—	—	
9		Ed Walsh*	1924	3	1	2	.333	—	—	—	—	—	
10		Eddie Collins*	1924	27	14	13	.519	—	—	—	—	—	
—		Johnny Evers*	1924	103	41	61	.402	—	—	—	—	—	
—		Eddie Collins*	1925–1926	309	160	147	.521	—	—	—	—	—	
11		Ray Schalk*	1927–1928	228	102	125	.449	—	—	—	—	—	
12		Lena Blackburne	1928–1929	232	99	133	.427	—	—	—	—	—	
13		Donie Bush	1930–1931	310	118	189	.384	—	—	—	—	—	
14		Lew Fonseca	1932–1934	318	120	196	.380	—	—	—	—	—	
15		Jimmy Dykes	1934–1946	1,850	899	940	.489	—	—	—	—	—	
16		Ted Lyons*	1946–1948	434	185	245	.430	—	—	—	—	—	
17		Jack Onslow	1949–1950	185	73	113	.386	—	—	—	—	—	
18		Red Corriden	1950	125	52	72	.419	—	—	—	—	—	
19		Paul Richards	1951–1954	613	342	265	.563	—	—	—	—	—	
20		Marty Marion	1954–1956	318	179	138	.565	—	—	—	—	—	
21		Al Lopez^{†}	1957–1965	1,431	811	615	.569	1	2	4	1	0	
22		Eddie Stanky	1966–1968	404	206	197	.511	—	—	—	—	—	
23		Les Moss	1968	2	0	2	.000	—	—	—	—	—	
—		Al Lopez^{†}	1968	11	6	5	.545	—	—	—	—	—	
—		Les Moss	1968	34	12	22	.353	—	—	—	—	—	
—		Al Lopez^{†}	1968–1969	53	23	30	.434	—	—	—	—	—	
24		Don Gutteridge	1969–1970	281	109	172	.388	—	—	—	—	—	
25		Bill Adair	1970	10	4	6	.400	—	—	—	—	—	
26		Chuck Tanner	1970–1975	818	401	414	.492	—	—	—	—	—	
—		Paul Richards	1976	161	64	97	.398	—	—	—	—	—	
27		Bob Lemon*	1977–1978	236	124	112	.525	—	—	—	—	—	
28		Larry Doby*	1978	87	37	50	.425	—	—	—	—	—	
29		Don Kessinger	1979	106	46	60	.434	—	—	—	—	—	
30		Tony La Russa^{†}	1979–1986	1,035	522	510	.506	1	1	3	0	0	
31		Doug Rader	1986	2	1	1	.500	—	—	—	—	—	
32		Jim Fregosi	1986–1988	419	193	226	.461	—	—	—	—	—	
33		Jeff Torborg	1989–1991	485	250	235	.515	—	—	—	—	—	
34		Gene Lamont	1992–1995	468	258	210	.551	1	2	4	0	0	
35		Terry Bevington	1995–1997	437	222	214	.509	—	—	—	—	—	
36		Jerry Manuel	1998–2003	971	500	471	.515	1	0	3	0	0	
37		Ozzie Guillén	2004–2011	1,295	678	617	.524	2	12	4	1	1	
38		Don Cooper	2011	2	1	1	.500	—	—	—	—	—	
39		Robin Ventura	2012–2016	810	375	435	.463	—	—	—	—	—	
40		Rick Renteria	2017–2020	545	236	309	.433	1	1	2	0	0	
—		Tony La Russa^{†}	2021–2022	324	174	150	.537	1	1	3	—	—	
42		Miguel Cairo	2022	34	18	16	.529	—	—	—	—	—	
43		Pedro Grifol	2023–2024	279	89	190	.319	—	—	—	—	—	
44		Grady Sizemore	2024	45	13	32	.289	—	—	—	—	—	
45		Will Venable	2025–present	324	144	180	.444	1	4	3	—	—	

== Managers with multiple tenures ==
Statistics current through 2020 season

#	Manager	Seasons	G	W	L	Win%	PA	PW	PL	LC	WS	Ref(s)
2	Nixey Callahan	1903–1904, 1912–1914	648	309	329	.484	—	—	—	—	—	
8	Johnny Evers*	1924	124	51	72	.415	—	—	—	—	—	
10	Eddie Collins*	1924, 1925–1926	336	174	160	.521	—	—	—	—	—	
19	Paul Richards	1951–1954, 1976	774	406	362	.529	—	—	—	—	—	
21	Al Lopez^{†}	1957–1965, 1968, 1968–1969	1,495	840	650	.564	1	2	4	1	0	
23	Les Moss	1968	36	12	24	.333	—	—	—	—	—	
30	Tony La Russa^{†}	1979–1986, 2021–2022	1,322	678	644	.513	1	1	3	0	0	
