= Crockett Park =

Public park in Brentwood, Tennessee, US

Coordinates: 35°58′53″N 86°46′10″W

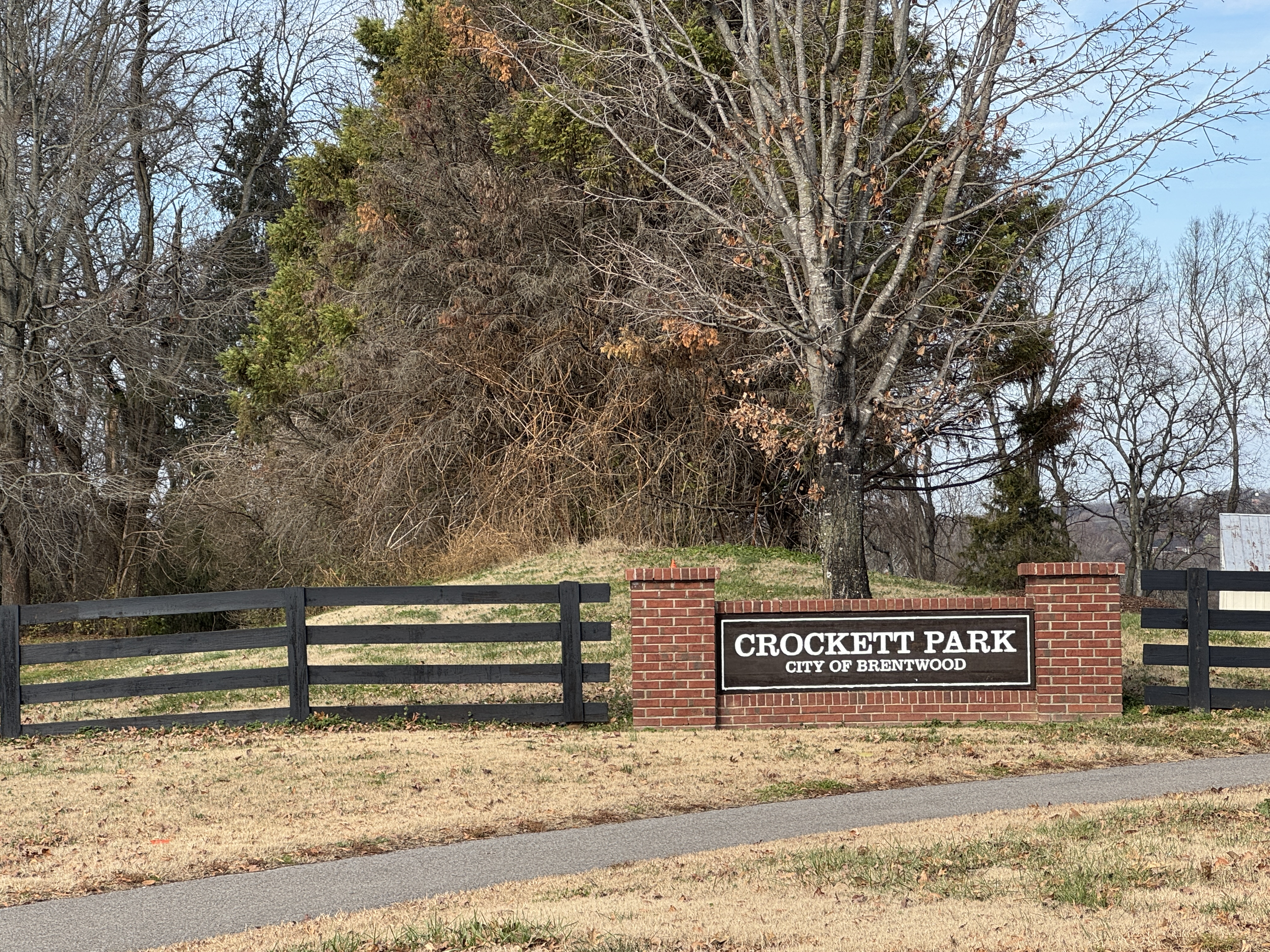
Crockett Park entrance

Crockett Park is a public park located in Brentwood, Tennessee, at 1500 Volunteer Parkway. It is the second-largest park within the city's park system, encompassing approximately 164-acres of recreational and natural areas, and housing the majority of the city's public sports fields. The park serves as a central hub for outdoor activities, local sports, community events, and cultural programming in the Brentwood area. The park is home to several natural features, including open meadows, wooded areas, and a small creek.

Located adjacent to Crockett Elementary School, Woodland Middle School, and Holy Family Catholic Church, Crockett Park also includes spaces designated for passive recreation, such as open lawns suitable for relaxation or informal activities. Crockett Park is managed by the Brentwood Parks and Recreation Department. The department oversees maintenance, programming, and facility reservations for the community. The park's land includes the historic Cool Springs House, which dates back to the mid-19th century.

== History ==
Crockett Park is named after the historical Crockett family of Tennessee, early settlers of the middle Tennessee region. The Crockett family was one of Brentwood's earliest and most prominent families, originally of French descent. The first Crockett to come to America was Samuel Crockett around 1720. The Crockett's obtained four land grants in Williamson County from the Revolutionary War. His son, Andrew Crockett, settled in Brentwood in 1799 within the current location of Crockett Park under one of these land grants. Andrew Crockett built the first house on the historical Crockett land grant (the Andrew Crockett House that is still standing today) sometime before 1801. This 640-acre land grant was passed down, divided up, sold various times, and owned privately until a portion was purchased by the City of Brentwood to build a new park.

The City of Brentwood purchased the acreage for Crockett Park in 1991. The first phase of the park, building out fields and parking facilities, was completed in 1993. The original amphitheater and spectator hill was completed in 1993, which would be remodeled in 2000 thanks to a donation by country artist Eddy Arnold. A bikeway that connected local elementary schools and added concrete trails to the park was completed in 1996. The final phase of the initial park plan was completed in 1997, finalizing construction of baseball fields, concession stands, pavilions, tennis courts, and administrative buildings.

== Cultural and community events ==
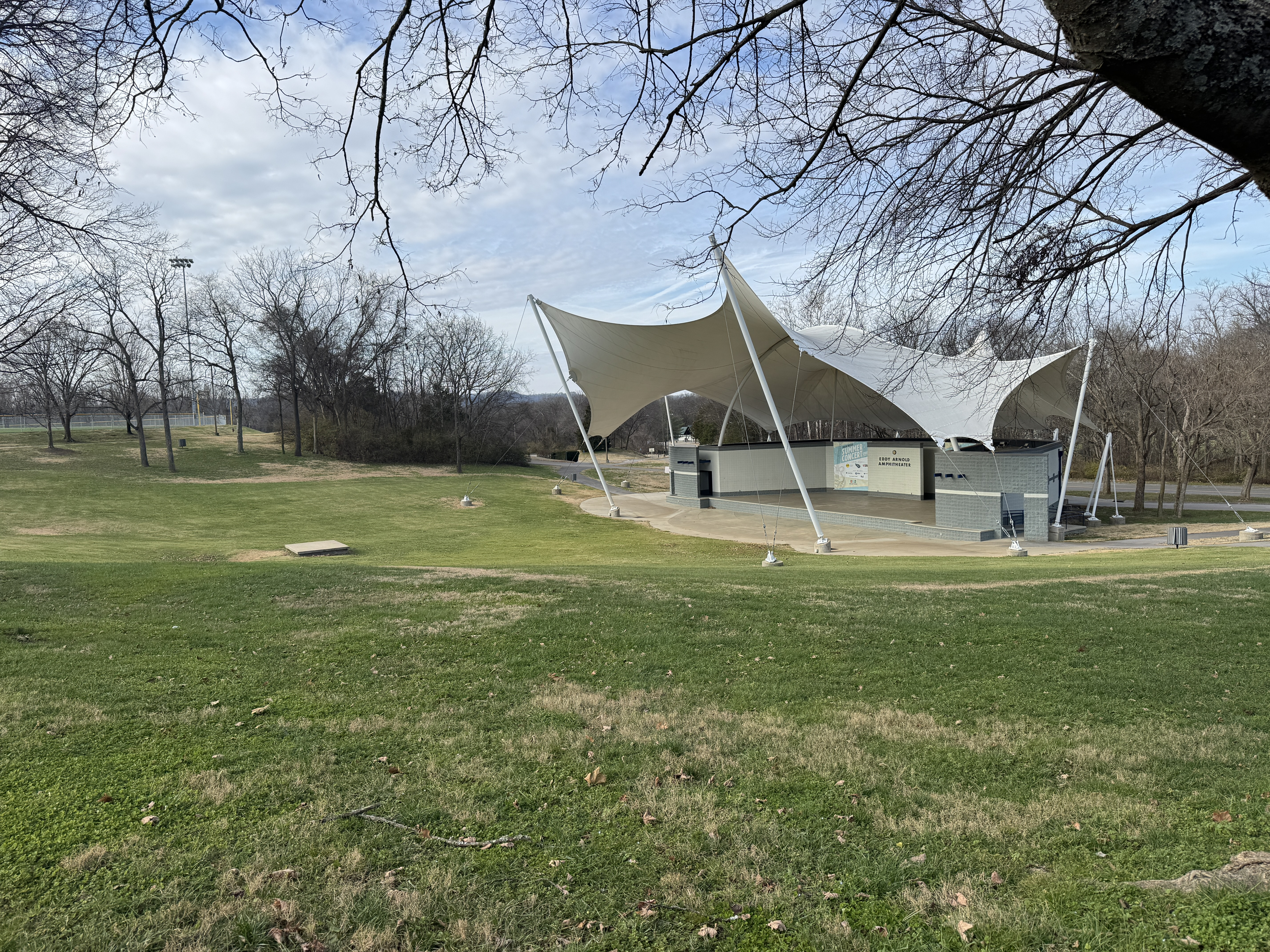
Eddy Arnold Amphitheater

Crockett Park is known for hosting numerous events throughout the year, such as:

- Summer Concert Series: Featuring live performances from local and national artists, the concert series generally concludes before the Fourth of July celebration.
- Fourth of July Celebration: A community event with fireworks, live music, and family activities. Over 10,000 people from middle Tennessee attend the celebration annually.
- Sports Tournaments: Local leagues, school sports, and regional tournaments frequently utilize the park's facilities.

== Facilities and amenities ==
Crockett Park is centrally located in Brentwood and easily accessible by car or bike, with ample parking facilities. The park also connects to the Brentwood Greenway System, providing seamless access to other parks and trails throughout the city. Crockett Park offers a wide range of facilities for both active and passive recreation:

- Athletic Fields: The park includes multiple baseball, football, and soccer fields, accommodating local leagues and tournaments, as well as the adjacent Woodland Middle School.
- Walking and Biking Trails: Over 10 miles of paved trails wind through the park, connecting to the larger Brentwood trail network, available for jogging, walking, and cycling.
- Eddy Arnold Amphitheater: The Eddy Arnold Amphitheater, named after the famed country music singer, hosts outdoor concerts and community events, including the annual summer concert series which features the Nashville Symphony Orchestra. In March 2000, Arnold donated $300,000 for the amphitheater's remodeling and construction.
- Playground: The park features an expansive wooden playground, offering safe and engaging play areas for children of various age groups.
- Picnic Shelters: Multiple pavilions and open-air picnic shelters are available for public use and private reservations.
- Tennis Courts: Lighted tennis courts are available for use on a first-come, first-served basis.
- Indoor Soccer Facility: The Robert A. Ring Indoor Soccer Facility is located in the park, hosting games of indoor soccer, flag football, and lacrosse year-round.
- Disc Golf Course: An 18-hole disc golf course was established in 2005. The Professional Disc Golf Association lists the course length as 7,404 feet.

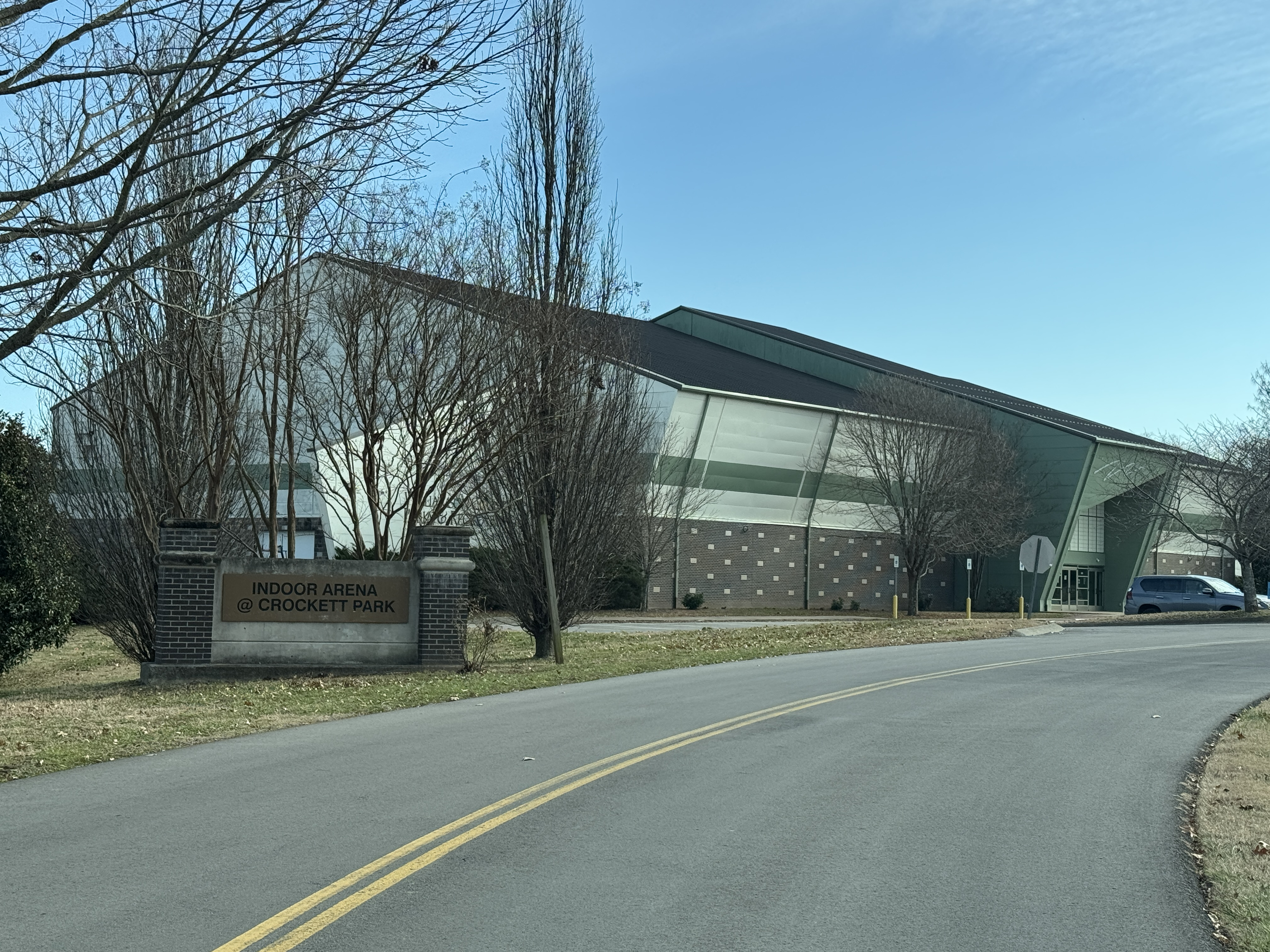
Indoor soccer facility at Crockett Park

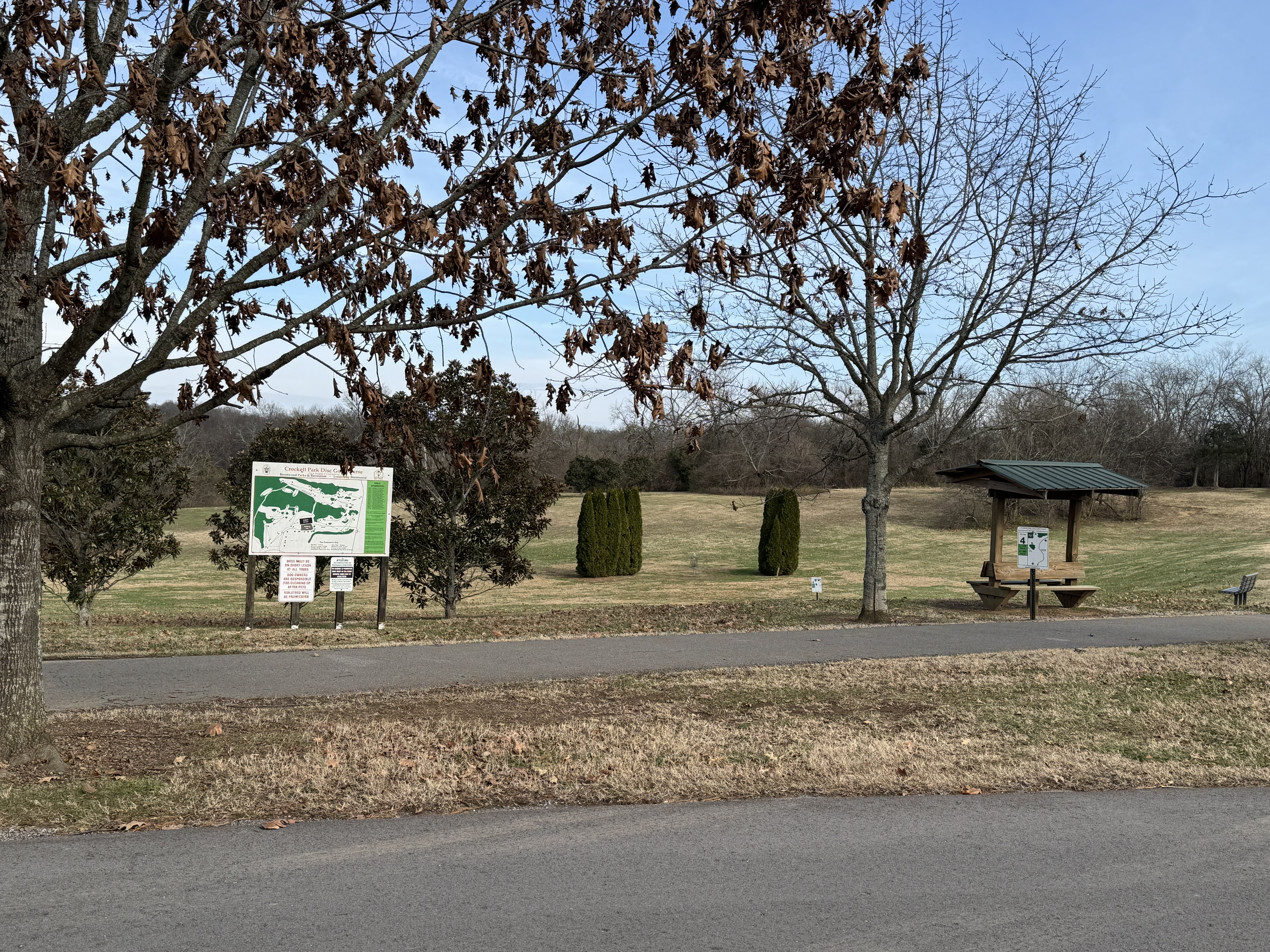
Crockett Park disc golf course start

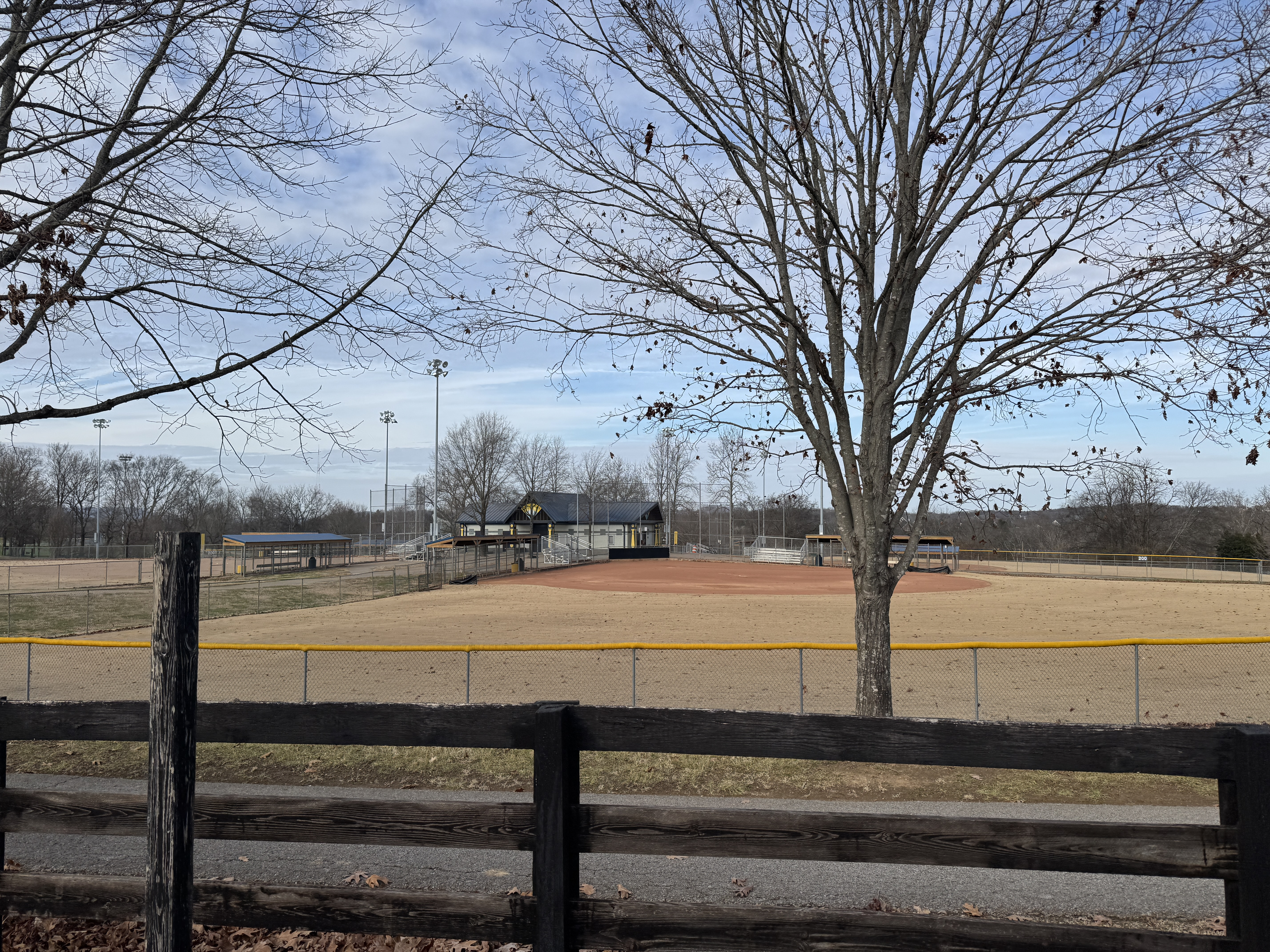
Baseball fields at Crockett Park

== Cool Springs House ==
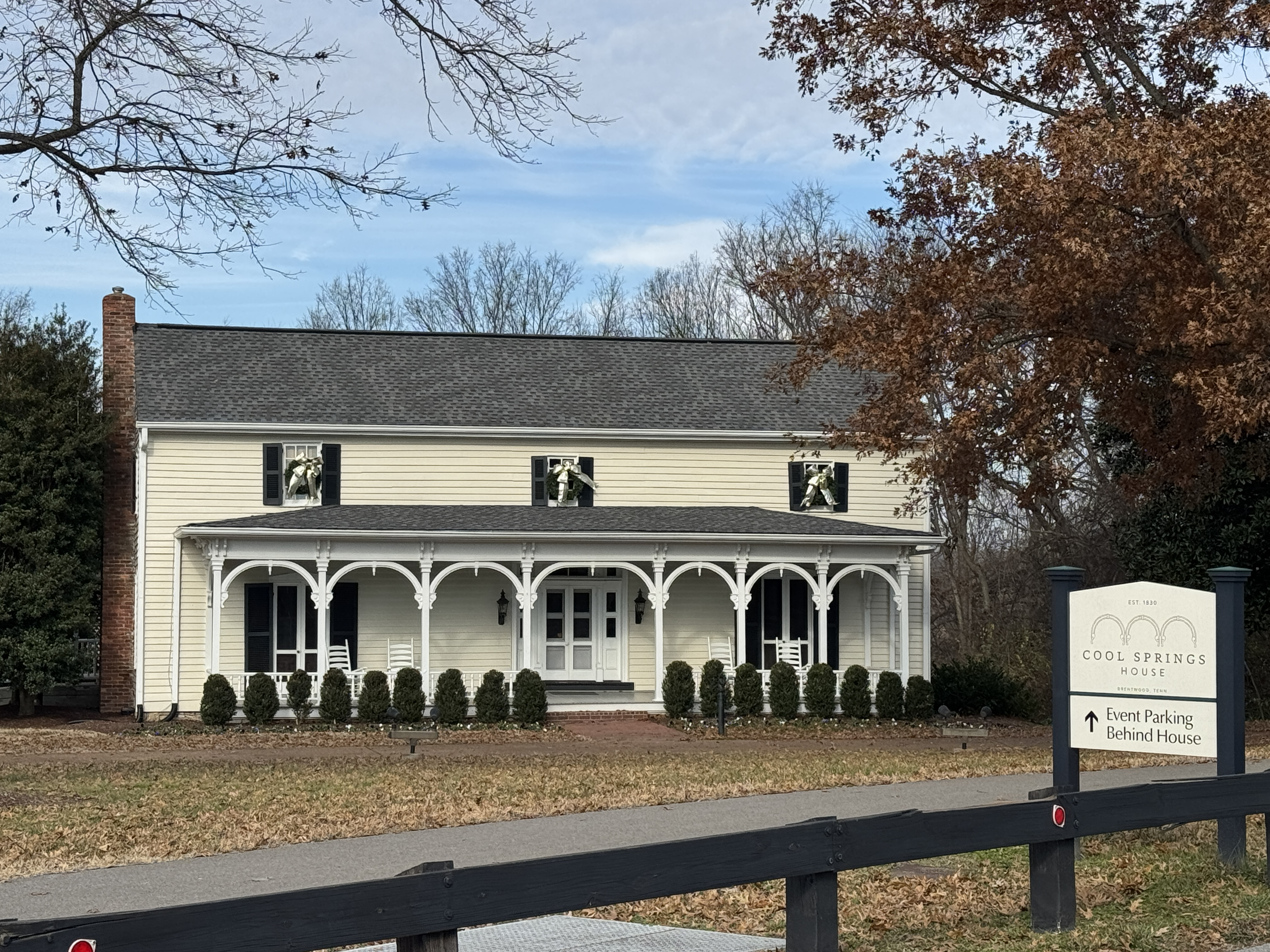
Cool Springs House in its Crockett Park location

Located within the park, the Cool Springs House serves as a historic centerpiece and is a popular venue for weddings, meetings, and other private events. Its architecture was restored to reflect the cultural heritage of the region after being built as a two-room log home in the 1830s.

According to the Historical Marker Database, the original two-story log portion of the house was built around 1830 by James Carothers. James Carothers served in the Tennessee Militia in Capt. John Crawford's Company. During the War of 1812 and the Creek War, he participated in the battle of Talladega and Tallushatches, for which service he was granted 160 acres that the house would be built on. His son, Dr. Robert Blake Carothers, added the frame to the house sometime in the 1870s with his wife Martha Crockett. At this time, it was one of the largest homes in middle Tennessee.

Originally located on Mallory Road further across the county, it was moved to Crockett Park by the City of Brentwood in 1993 to preserve the home from commercial development. Its former site was in an area of rapid growth and development that was expected to jeopardize the preservation of the historic home. In order to be moved, the house had to be split in half and carried by local fire department trucks in collaboration with telephone and electric companies to remove poles to fit the house on Brentwood's streets. Both halves of the house took full days to move, and required stoppage of trains, traffic, and removal of citizen mailboxes.

The National Historic Places Register Reference Number for the house and its original adjacent farmland is #83004314, and the house was added to the register on November 10, 1983. However, the house was removed from the register on October 20, 1993, due to the move from its original land. The reason for rejection was because the new site was "a small lot within an intensely developed, active recreational park. If the Cool Springs buildings are relocated as planned, it appears that all sense of the rural character of the property will be lost."

Cool Springs House in the 1880s

Cool Springs House Relocation Plan

== Brentvale Log Cabin ==
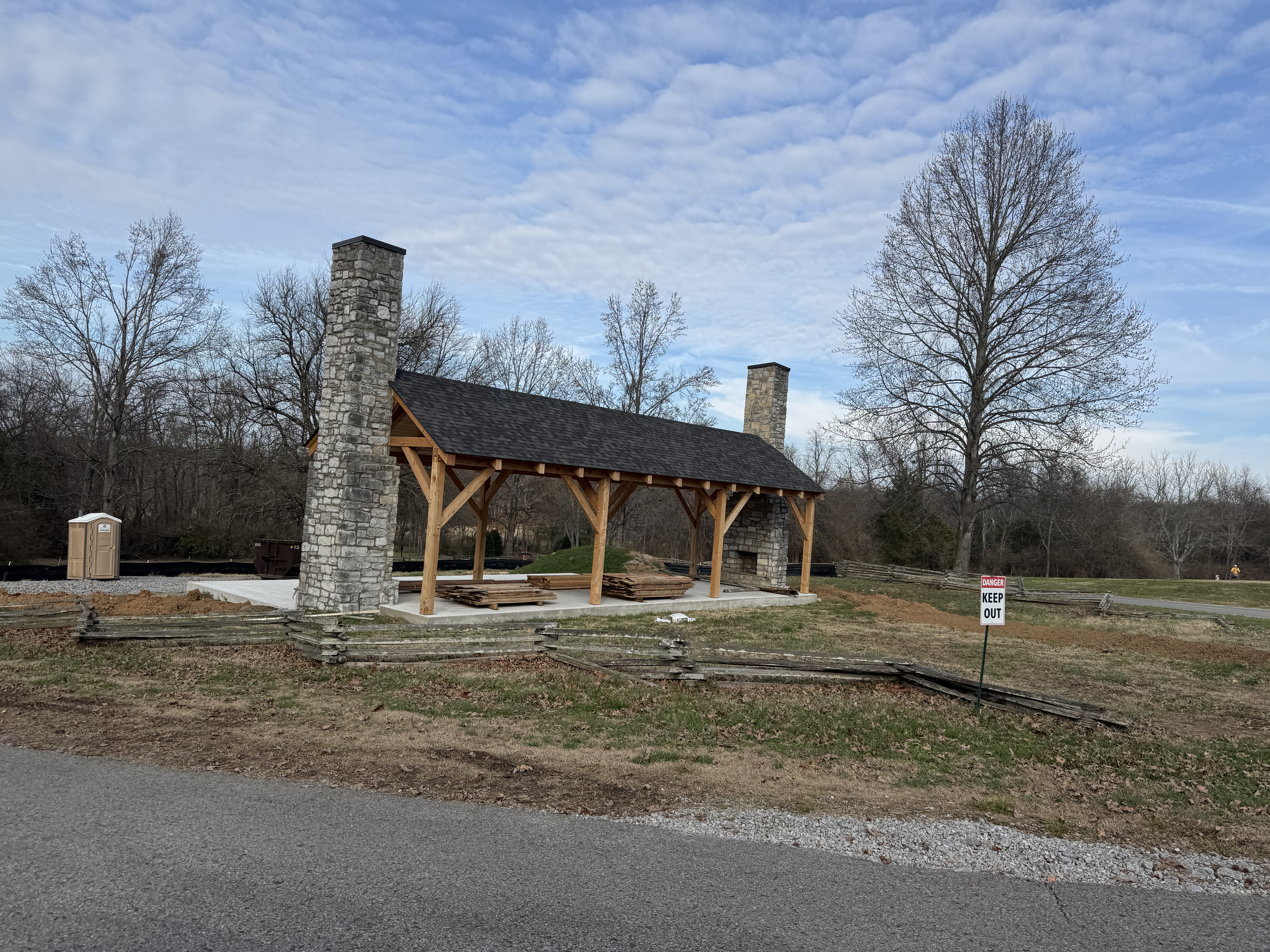
Brentvale Log Cabin after demolition

The Brentvale Log Cabin was a historical cabin that was located at the entrance of Crockett Park, but removed in July 2022 due to deterioration of the foundation. The log cabin was estimated to have used 200-year-old logs. The cabin was originally located on Old Smyrna Road and was the home of William Temple Sneed, son of early Tennessee settler James Sneed. The Sneeds were one of Brentwood's first families—James Sneed relocated from Virginia in the 1790s after purchasing land the would eventually house the Brentvale Log Cabin. The cabin was constructed around 1830 and in the 1930s enlarged by joining two log cabins. In 1993, the owners gifted the cabin to the city, and the city paid for it to be moved and assembled at Crockett Park.
