= 1991 Detroit Tigers season =

Major League Baseball season

1991 Detroit Tigers
- League: American League
- Division: East
- Ballpark: Tiger Stadium
- City: Detroit, Michigan
- Record: 84–78 (.519)
- Divisional place: T–2nd
- Owners: Tom Monaghan
- General managers: Joe McDonald
- Managers: Sparky Anderson
- Television: WDIV-TV (George Kell, Al Kaline); PASS (Larry Osterman, Jim Northrup)
- Radio: WJR (Ernie Harwell, Paul Carey)

The 1991 Detroit Tigers season was the team's 91st season and the 80th season at Tiger Stadium. The Tigers finished in a tie for second place in the American League East with a record of 84–78 (.519). They outscored their opponents 817 to 794. The Tigers drew 1,641,661 fans to Tiger Stadium in 1991, ranking 12th of the 14 teams in the American League.

== Offseason ==
- November 26, 1990: John Shelby was signed as a free agent by the Tigers.
- December 3, 1990: Bill Gullickson was signed as a free agent by the Tigers.
- December 3, 1990: Buddy Groom was drafted by the Tigers from the Chicago White Sox in the 1990 minor league draft.
- January 11, 1991: Jeff Robinson was traded by the Tigers to the Baltimore Orioles for Mickey Tettleton.
- January 21, 1991: Skeeter Barnes was signed as a free agent by the Tigers.
- March 19, 1991: Torey Lovullo was traded by the Tigers to the New York Yankees for Mark Leiter.

== Regular season ==
- In 1991, Cecil Fielder led all of baseball in home runs (44) and RBIs (133) for the second consecutive season. Once again, he finished second in the MVP voting. The MVP award was given to Orioles shortstop Cal Ripken Jr. Angry over missing out on the honor for the second straight season, Fielder lashed out at the voters, going so far as to accuse them of racism in their selection of Ripken, who was white.
- During the season, Bill Gullickson would be the last pitcher to win at least 20 games in one season for the Tigers in the 20th century.

=== Season standings ===
AL East
Team	W	L	Pct.	GB	Home	Road
Toronto Blue Jays	91	71	.562	—	46‍–‍35	45‍–‍36
Boston Red Sox	84	78	.519	7	43‍–‍38	41‍–‍40
Detroit Tigers	84	78	.519	7	49‍–‍32	35‍–‍46
Milwaukee Brewers	83	79	.512	8	43‍–‍37	40‍–‍42
New York Yankees	71	91	.438	20	39‍–‍42	32‍–‍49
Baltimore Orioles	67	95	.414	24	33‍–‍48	34‍–‍47
Cleveland Indians	57	105	.352	34	30‍–‍52	27‍–‍53

=== Record vs. opponents ===
1991 American League record Sources:
Team	BAL	BOS	CAL	CWS	CLE	DET	KC	MIL	MIN	NYY	OAK	SEA	TEX	TOR
Baltimore	—	8–5	6–6	4–8	7–6	5–8	4–8	3–10	4–8	5–8	3–9	4–8	9–3	5–8
Boston	5–8	—	4–8	7–5	9–4	5–8	7–5	7–6	3–9	6–7	8–4	9–3	5–7	9–4
California	6–6	8–4	—	8–5	7–5	5–7	9–4	6–6	8–5	6–6	1–12	6–7	5–8	6–6
Chicago	8–4	5–7	5–8	—	6–6	4–8	7–6	7–5	8–5	8–4	7–6	7–6	8–5	7–5
Cleveland	6–7	4–9	5–7	6–6	—	7–6	4–8	5–8	2–10	6–7	5–7	2–10	4–8	1–12
Detroit	8–5	8–5	7–5	8–4	6–7	—	8–4	4–9	4–8	8–5	4–8	8–4	6–6	5–8
Kansas City	8–4	5–7	4–9	6–7	8–4	4–8	—	9–3	6–7	7–5	6–7	7–6	7–6	5–7
Milwaukee	10–3	6–7	6–6	5–7	8–5	9–4	3–9	—	6–6	6–7	8–4	3–9	7–5	6–7
Minnesota	8–4	9–3	5–8	5–8	10–2	8–4	7–6	6–6	—	10–2	8–5	9–4	6–7	4–8
New York	8–5	7–6	6–6	4–8	7–6	5–8	5–7	7–6	2–10	—	6–6	3–9	5–7	6–7
Oakland	9–3	4–8	12–1	6–7	7–5	8–4	7–6	4–8	5–8	6–6	—	6–7	4–9	6–6
Seattle	8–4	3–9	7–6	6–7	10–2	4–8	6–7	9–3	4–9	9–3	7–6	—	5–8	5–7
Texas	3–9	7–5	8–5	5–8	8–4	6–6	6–7	5–7	7–6	7–5	9–4	8–5	—	6–6
Toronto	8–5	4–9	6–6	5–7	12–1	8–5	7–5	7–6	8–4	7–6	6–6	7–5	6–6	—

=== Opening Day lineup ===
DH Tony Phillips
LF Lloyd Moseby
SS Alan Trammell
1B Cecil Fielder
2B Lou Whitaker
RF Rob Deer
C Mickey Tettleton
3B Travis Fryman
CF Milt Cuyler

=== Notable transactions ===
- April 5, 1991: Scott Lusader was selected off waivers from the Tigers by the New York Yankees.
- June 3, 1991: Kevin Morgan was drafted by the Tigers in the 30th round of the 1991 Major League Baseball draft.
- June 11, 1991: Jeff Kaiser was signed as a free agent by the Tigers.
- August 5, 1991: John Moses was signed as a free agent by the Tigers.
- August 13, 1991: John Shelby was released by the Tigers.
- August 25, 1991: John Moses was released by the Tigers.

=== Roster ===
1991 Detroit Tigers
Roster
Pitchers: 30 Scott Aldred; 55 John Cerutti; 42 Mike Dalton; 32 Dan Gakeler; 48 Paul Gibson; 19 Jerry Don Gleaton; 36 Bill Gullickson; 16 Dave Haas; 39 Mike Henneman; 49 Jeff Kaiser; 46 John Kiely; 23 Mark Leiter; 41 Rusty Meacham; 43 Mike Munoz; 46 Dan Petry; 31 Kevin Ritz; 49 Steve Searcy; 26 Frank Tanana; 35 Walt Terrell	Catchers: 10 Andy Allanson; 12 Rich Rowland; 27 Mark Salas; 20 Mickey Tettleton; Infielders: 14 Dave Bergman; 9 Tony Bernazard; 45 Cecil Fielder; 24 Travis Fryman; 21 Scott Livingstone; 34 Johnny Paredes; 3 Alan Trammell; 1 Lou Whitaker	Outfielders: 9 Skeeter Barnes; 22 Milt Cuyler; 17 Luis de los Santos; 44 Rob Deer; 25 Shawn Hare; 29 Pete Incaviglia; 15 Lloyd Moseby; 8 John Moses; 4 Tony Phillips; 25 John Shelby	Manager: 11 Sparky Anderson; Coaches: 50 Billy Consolo; 51 Alex Grammas; 56 Billy Muffett; 28 Vada Pinson; 53 Dick Tracewski

== Player stats ==
= Indicates team leader

= Indicates league leader

=== Batting ===
==== Starters by position ====
Note: Pos = Position; G = Games played; AB = At bats; H = Hits; Avg. = Batting average; HR = Home runs; RBI = Runs batted in

Pos	Player	G	AB	H	Avg.	HR	RBI
C	Mickey Tettleton	154	501	132	.263	31	89
1B	Cecil Fielder	162	624	163	.261	44*	133
2B	Lou Whitaker	138	470	131	.279	23	78
3B	Travis Fryman	149	557	144	.259	21	91
SS	Alan Trammell	101	375	93	.248	9	55
LF	Lloyd Moseby	74	260	68	.262	6	35
CF	Milt Cuyler	154	475	122	.257	3	33
RF	Rob Deer	134	448	80	.179	25	64
DH	Pete Incaviglia	97	337	72	.214	11	38

- Tied with Jose Canseco (OAK) for league lead

==== Other batters ====
Note: G = Games played; AB = At bats; H = Hits; Avg. = Batting average; HR = Home runs; RBI = Runs batted in

Player	G	AB	H	Avg.	HR	RBI
Tony Phillips	146	564	160	.284	17	72
Dave Bergman	86	194	46	.237	7	29
Skeeter Barnes	75	159	46	.289	5	17
Andy Allanson	60	151	35	.232	1	16
John Shelby	53	143	22	.154	3	8
Scott Livingstone	44	127	37	.291	2	11
Mark Salas	33	57	5	.088	1	7
Luis de los Santos	16	30	5	.167	0	0
John Moses	13	21	1	.048	0	1
Shawn Hare	9	19	1	.053	0	0
Johnny Paredes	16	18	6	.333	0	0
Tony Bernazard	6	12	2	.167	0	0
Rich Rowland	4	4	1	.250	0	1

=== Pitching ===
==== Starting pitchers ====
Note: G = Games pitched; IP = Innings pitched; W = Wins; L = Losses; ERA = Earned run average; SO = Strikeouts

Player	G	IP	W	L	ERA	SO
Bill Gullickson	35	226.1	20*	9	3.90	91
Walt Terrell	35	218.2	12	14	4.24	80
Frank Tanana	33	217.1	13	12	3.77	107
Scott Aldred	11	57.1	2	4	5.18	35

- Tied with Scott Erickson (MIN) for league lead.

==== Other pitchers ====
Note: G = Games pitched; IP = Innings pitched; W = Wins; L = Losses; ERA = Earned run average; SO = Strikeouts

Player	G	IP	W	L	ERA	SO
Mark Leiter	38	134.2	9	7	4.21	103
John Cerutti	38	88.2	3	6	4.57	29
Dan Gakeler	31	73.2	1	4	5.74	43
Dan Petry	17	54.2	2	3	4.94	18
Steve Searcy	16	40.2	1	2	8.41	32
Rusty Meacham	10	27.2	2	1	5.20	14
Kevin Ritz	11	15.1	0	3	11.74	9

==== Relief pitchers ====
Note: G = Games pitched; W= Wins; L= Losses; SV = Saves; GF = Games Finished; ERA = Earned run average; SO = Strikeouts

Player	G	W	L	SV	GF	ERA	SO
Mike Henneman	60	10	2	21	50	2.88	61
Paul Gibson	68	5	7	8	28	4.59	52
Jerry Don Gleaton	47	3	2	2	16	4.06	47
Dave Haas	11	1	0	0	0	6.75	6
Jeff Kaiser	10	0	1	2	4	9.00	4
John Kiely	7	0	1	0	3	14.85	1
Mike Munoz	6	0	0	0	4	9.64	3
Mike Dalton	4	0	0	0	1	3.38	4

== Awards and honors ==
- Mickey Tettleton, AL Silver Slugger Award at catcher
- Cecil Fielder, AL Silver Slugger Award at first base

=== League top ten finishers ===
Rob Deer

- MLB leader in strikeouts (175)
- #8 in AL in bases on balls (89)
- #9 in AL in at bats per home run (17.9)

Cecil Fielder

- Finished 2nd in AL MVP voting behind Cal Ripken Jr.
- MLB leader in home runs (44)
- MLB leader in RBIs (133)
- MLB leader in games played (162)
- #2 in AL in at bats per home run (11.2)
- #3 in AL in strikeouts (151)
- #6 in AL in total bases (320)
- #6 in AL in extra base hits (69)
- #8 in AL in plate appearances (712)
- #9 in AL in slugging percentage (.513)
- #9 in AL in runs scored (102)
- #10 in AL in runs created (110)

Travis Fryman

- #4 in AL in strikeouts (149)

Paul Gibson

- #7 in AL in games (68)

Bill Gullickson

- Finished 8th in AL Cy Young Award voting
- MLB leader in wins (20)
- AL leader in games started (35)
- #4 in AL in win percentage (.690)
- #4 in AL in bases on balls per 9 innings pitched (1.75)
- #7 in AL in earned runs allowed (98)

Mike Henneman

- #9 in AL in games finished (50)

Walt Terrell

- AL leader in hits allowed (257)
- #3 in AL in earned runs allowed (103)
- #4 in AL in losses (14)
- #5 in AL in complete games (8)
- #6 in AL in shutouts (2)

Mickey Tettleton

- #2 in AL in bases on balls (101)
- #4 in AL in at bats per home run (16.2)
- #6 in AL in home runs (31)
- #7 in AL in strikeouts (131)

=== Players ranking among top 100 all time at position ===
The following members of the 1991 Detroit Tigers are among the Top 100 of all time at their position, as ranked by The Bill James Historical Baseball Abstract:

- Lou Whitaker: 13th best second baseman of all time
- Alan Trammell: 9th best shortstop of all time

== Farm system ==
Level	Team	League	Manager
AAA	Toledo Mud Hens	International League	Joe Sparks
AA	London Tigers	Eastern League	Gene Roof
A	Lakeland Tigers	Florida State League	Johnny Lipon
A	Fayetteville Generals	South Atlantic League	Gerry Groninger
A-Short Season	Niagara Falls Rapids	New York–Penn League	Gary Calhoun
Rookie	Bristol Tigers	Appalachian League	Juan López
