= 1992 Detroit Tigers season =

Major League Baseball season

1992 Detroit Tigers
- League: American League
- Division: East
- Ballpark: Tiger Stadium
- City: Detroit, Michigan
- Record: 75–87
- Divisional place: 6th
- Owners: Mike Ilitch
- General managers: Joe McDonald
- Managers: Sparky Anderson
- Television: WDIV-TV (George Kell, Al Kaline); PASS (Larry Osterman, Jim Northrup)
- Radio: WJR (Rick Rizzs, Bob Rathbun)

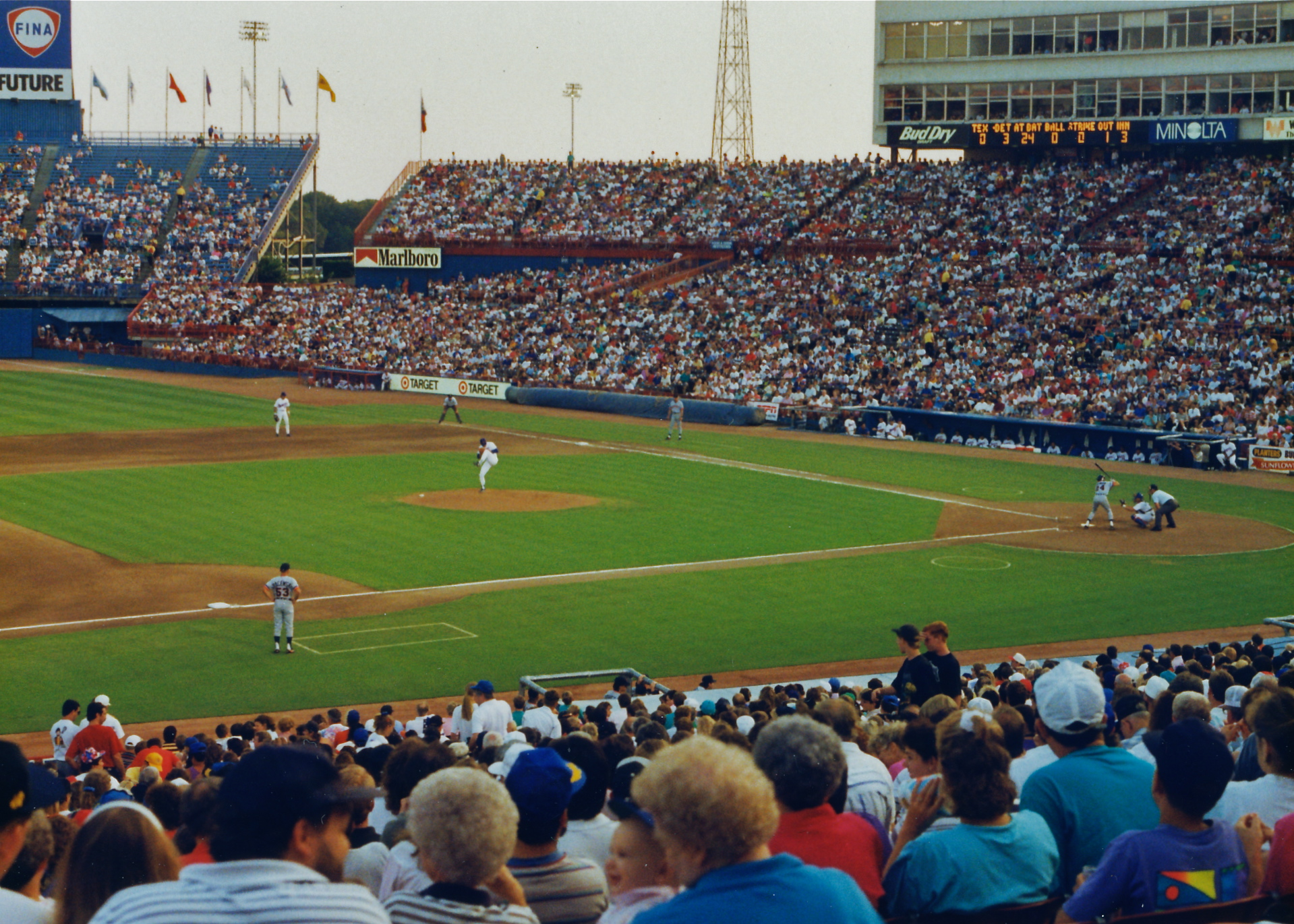
The Tigers playing against the Texas Rangers during a 1992 away game at Arlington Stadium.

The 1992 Detroit Tigers season was the team's 92nd season and the 81st season at Tiger Stadium. It was also first season under the ownership of Mike Ilitch, after he bought the team from Tom Monaghan.

== Offseason ==
- December 20, 1991: Dan Gladden was signed as a free agent by the Tigers.
- January 15, 1992: Jorge Velandia was signed as an amateur free agent by the Tigers.
- Before 1992 Season: Steve Carter was signed as a free agent with the Detroit Tigers.

== Regular season ==
- Cecil Fielder was left off the All Star team despite leading the league in RBIs at the midway point. At season's end, Fielder wound up third to Juan González and Mark McGwire in the American League home run chase. His 124 RBIs made him the first American Leaguer since Babe Ruth to lead the majors in runs batted in for three consecutive seasons.
- On September 25, Sparky Anderson tied Hughie Jennings for most wins as Tigers manager (1,131 wins). He became the team's most successful manager two days later, with a 13–3 victory over the Cleveland Indians.

Opening Day lineup
LF Dan Gladden
2B Lou Whitaker
SS Alan Trammell
1B Cecil Fielder
C Mickey Tettleton
DH Tony Phillips
RF Rob Deer
3B Travis Fryman
CF Milt Cuyler

=== Season standings ===
AL East
Team	W	L	Pct.	GB	Home	Road
Toronto Blue Jays	96	66	.593	—	53‍–‍28	43‍–‍38
Milwaukee Brewers	92	70	.568	4	53‍–‍28	39‍–‍42
Baltimore Orioles	89	73	.549	7	43‍–‍38	46‍–‍35
Cleveland Indians	76	86	.469	20	41‍–‍40	35‍–‍46
New York Yankees	76	86	.469	20	41‍–‍40	35‍–‍46
Detroit Tigers	75	87	.463	21	38‍–‍42	37‍–‍45
Boston Red Sox	73	89	.451	23	44‍–‍37	29‍–‍52

=== Record vs. opponents ===
1992 American League record Sources:
Team	BAL	BOS	CAL	CWS	CLE	DET	KC	MIL	MIN	NYY	OAK	SEA	TEX	TOR
Baltimore	—	8–5	8–4	6–6	7–6	10–3	8–4	6–7	6–6	5–8	6–6	7–5	7–5	5–8
Boston	5–8	—	8–4	6–6	6–7	4–9	7–5	5–8	3–9	7–6	5–7	6–6	4–8	7–6
California	4–8	4–8	—	3–10	6–6	7–5	8–5	5–7	2–11	7–5	5–8	7–6	9–4	5–7
Chicago	6–6	6–6	10–3	—	7–5	10–2	7–6	5–7	8–5	8–4	5–8	4–9	5–8	5–7
Cleveland	6–7	7–6	6–6	5–7	—	5–8	5–7	5–8	6–6	7–6	6–6	7–5	5–7	6–7
Detroit	3–10	9–4	5–7	2–10	8–5	—	7–5	5–8	3–9	5–8	6–6	9–3	8–4	5–8
Kansas City	4–8	5–7	5–8	6–7	7–5	5–7	—	7–5	6–7	5–7	4–9	7–6	6–7	5–7
Milwaukee	7–6	8–5	7–5	7–5	8–5	8–5	5–7	—	6–6	6–7	7–5	8–4	7–5	8–5
Minnesota	6–6	9–3	11–2	5–8	6–6	9–3	7–6	6–6	—	7–5	5–8	8–5	6–7	5–7
New York	8–5	6–7	5–7	4–8	6–7	8–5	7–5	7–6	5–7	—	6–6	6–6	6–6	2–11
Oakland	6–6	7–5	8–5	8–5	6–6	6–6	9–4	5–7	8–5	6–6	—	12–1	9–4	6–6
Seattle	5–7	6–6	6–7	9–4	5–7	3–9	6–7	4–8	5–8	6–6	1–12	—	4–9	4–8
Texas	5–7	8–4	4–9	8–5	7–5	4–8	7–6	5–7	7–6	6–6	4–9	9–4	—	3–9
Toronto	8–5	6–7	7–5	7–5	7–6	8–5	7–5	5–8	7–5	11–2	6–6	8–4	9–3	—

=== Notable transactions ===
- June 1, 1992: Frank Catalanotto was drafted by the Tigers in the 10th round of the 1992 Major League Baseball draft. Player signed June 2, 1992.

=== Roster ===
1992 Detroit Tigers
Roster
Pitchers: 30 Scott Aldred; 44 John Doherty; 42 Buddy Groom; 36 Bill Gullickson; 16 Dave Haas; 39 Mike Henneman; 46 John Kiely; 25 Eric King; 27 Kurt Knudsen; 48 Les Lancaster; 23 Mark Leiter; 43 Mike Munoz; 31 Kevin Ritz; 26 Frank Tanana; 35 Walt Terrell	Catchers: 19,62 Chad Kreuter; 12 Rich Rowland; 20 Mickey Tettleton; Infielders: 9 Skeeter Barnes; 14 Dave Bergman; 13 Rico Brogna; 45 Cecil Fielder; 24 Travis Fryman; 7 Scott Livingstone; 3 Alan Trammell; 1 Lou Whitaker	Outfielders: 15 Mark Carreon; 40 Phil Clark; 22 Milt Cuyler; 28 Rob Deer; 32 Dan Gladden; 10 Shawn Hare; 18 Gary Pettis; 4 Tony Phillips	Manager: 11 Sparky Anderson; Coaches: 50 Billy Consolo (Bench); 53 Larry Herndon (Hitting); 56 Billy Muffett (Pitching); 52 Gene Roof (First Base); 53 Dick Tracewski (Third Base); 59 Dan Whitmer (Bullpen)

== Player stats ==
= Indicates team leader

= Indicates league leader

=== Batting ===
==== Starters by position ====
Note: Pos = Position; G = Games played; AB = At bats; H = Hits; Avg. = Batting average; HR = Home runs; RBI = Runs batted in

Pos	Player	G	AB	H	Avg.	HR	RBI
C	Mickey Tettleton	157	525	125	.238	32	83
1B	Cecil Fielder	155	594	145	.244	35	124
2B	Lou Whitaker	130	453	126	.278	19	71
3B	Scott Livingstone	117	354	100	.282	4	46
SS	Travis Fryman	161	659	175	.266	20	96
LF	Dan Gladden	113	417	106	.254	7	42
CF	Milt Cuyler	89	291	70	.241	3	28
RF	Rob Deer	110	393	97	.247	32	64
DH	Tony Phillips	159	606	167	.276	10	64

==== Other batters ====
Note: G = Games played; AB = At bats; H = Hits; Avg. = Batting average; HR = Home runs; RBI = Runs batted in

Player	G	AB	H	Avg.	HR	RBI
Mark Carreon	101	336	78	.232	10	41
Chad Kreuter	67	190	48	.253	2	16
Dave Bergman	87	181	42	.232	1	10
Skeeter Barnes	95	165	45	.273	3	25
Gary Pettis	48	160	26	.202	1	12
Alan Trammell	29	102	28	.275	1	11
Phil Clark	23	54	22	.407	1	5
Shawn Hare	15	26	3	.115	0	5
Rico Brogna	9	26	5	.192	1	3
Rich Rowland	6	14	3	.214	0	0

=== Pitching ===
==== Starting pitchers ====
Note: G = Games pitched; IP = Innings pitched; W = Wins; L = Losses; ERA = Earned run average; SO = Strikeouts

Player	G	IP	W	L	ERA	SO
Bill Gullickson	34	221.2	14	13	4.34	64
Frank Tanana	32	186.2	13	11	4.39	91
Eric King	17	79.1	4	6	5.22	45
Scott Aldred	16	65.0	3	8	6.78	34
Dave Haas	12	61.2	5	3	3.94	29

==== Other pitchers ====
Note: G = Games pitched; IP = Innings pitched; W = Wins; L = Losses; ERA = Earned run average; SO = Strikeouts

Player	G	IP	W	L	ERA	SO
Walt Terrell	36	136.2	7	10	5.20	61
John Doherty	47	116.0	7	4	3.88	37
Mark Leiter	35	112.0	8	5	4.18	75
Kevin Ritz	23	80.1	2	5	5.60	57
Buddy Groom	12	38.2	0	5	5.82	15

==== Relief pitchers ====
Note: G = Games pitched; W = Wins; L = Losses; SV = Saves; ERA = Earned run average; SO = Strikeouts

Player	G	W	L	SV	ERA	SO
Mike Henneman	60	2	6	24	3.96	58
Mike Munoz	65	1	2	2	3.00	23
Kurt Knudsen	48	2	3	5	4.58	51
Les Lancaster	41	3	4	0	6.33	35
John Kiely	39	4	2	0	2.13	18

== Farm system ==
Level	Team	League	Manager
AAA	Toledo Mud Hens	International League	Joe Sparks
AA	London Tigers	Eastern League	Mark DeJohn
A	Lakeland Tigers	Florida State League	Johnny Lipon
A	Fayetteville Generals	South Atlantic League	Gerry Groninger
A-Short Season	Niagara Falls Rapids	New York–Penn League	Larry Parrish
Rookie	Bristol Tigers	Appalachian League	Mark Wagner

LEAGUE CHAMPIONS: Lakeland
