= 1992 Oakland Athletics season =

1992 Oakland Athletics
- American League West champions
- League: American League
- Division: West
- Ballpark: Oakland–Alameda County Coliseum
- City: Oakland, California
- Record: 96–66 (.593)
- Divisional place: 1st
- Owners: Walter A. Haas, Jr.
- General managers: Sandy Alderson
- Managers: Tony La Russa
- Television: KPIX/KICU-TV (Monte Moore, Ray Fosse); Sports Channel Pacific (Bill Rigney, Greg Papa, Reggie Jackson)
- Radio: KSFO (Bill King, Lon Simmons, Ray Fosse)

The Oakland Athletics' 1992 season was the team's 25th in Oakland, California. It was also the 92nd season in franchise history. The team finished first in the American League West with a record of 96–66.

The Athletics entered the 1992 season with high hopes. The team, in particular, hoped to see its pitching staff rebound from a dreadful 1991 performance; the Athletics' team earned run average (ERA) had ballooned from 3.18 in 1990 (1st of 14 AL teams) to 4.57 in 1991 (13th of 14 AL teams). The Athletics also hoped to continue their success on offense; in 1991, the team had scored a respectable 760 runs (the fifth-highest total in the AL). The offense, as always, was centered on superstars Mark McGwire, José Canseco, and Rickey Henderson.

The Athletics' hopes were largely answered. The team's pitching staff finished the season with an ERA of 3.73; this was the fourth-best average in the American League. Starter Dave Stewart, after an abysmal 1991 campaign, lowered his ERA to a respectable 3.66; his resurgence was mirrored by Bob Welch, who returned to near-ace status with a 3.27 ERA. The offense performed similarly well. Mark McGwire, following an awful 1991 campaign (in which he batted just .206 with 22 home runs), posted a .268 average in 1992 (while hitting 42 homers). Rickey Henderson stole 48 bases, Mike Bordick hit exactly .300, and José Canseco slugged another 22 home runs. Canseco was famously traded to the Texas Rangers, mid-game, on August 31; the Athletics received outfielder Rubén Sierra, reliever Jeff Russell, and starter Bobby Witt. The Athletics again scored the fourth-most runs in the American League in 1992.

The bulk of the Athletics' 1992 accolades, however, went to closer Dennis Eckersley. Eckersley saved an MLB-leading 51 games over the course of the season; in the process, he posted a 7–1 record with a 1.91 ERA. Eckersley's efforts netted him both the 1992 AL Cy Young Award and the 1992 AL MVP Award. Eckersley remains the last reliever (and remained, until 2011, the last pitcher of any kind) to be named MVP in either league.

The Athletics finished the 1992 season six games ahead of the second place (defending champion) Minnesota Twins. The division championship was their fourth in five years. In the ALCS, the A's faced a strong Toronto Blue Jays squad. The first three games of the series were decided by two runs or fewer; at the end of the Game 3, Oakland trailed Toronto 2 games to 1. In Game 4, Oakland led the Jays 6–1 after seven innings; a furious Toronto rally, however, resulted in a 7–6 victory (and a 3–1 Blue Jays series lead). The Athletics never recovered from the collapse, and ultimately succumbed to the favored Jays in six games.

The 1992 season signaled the end of an era in Oakland. The team would miss the postseason in each of the next seven seasons; by the time of the Athletics' next division title (2000), no members of the 1992 team remained in Oakland.

== Offseason ==
- October 11, 1991: Vance Law was released by the Athletics.
- January 17, 1992: Ron Darling was signed as a free agent by the Athletics.
- January 27, 1992: Goose Gossage was signed as a free agent by the Athletics.

== Regular season ==
- José Canseco tied an MLB record with seven consecutive plate appearances with a walk in games against the Texas Rangers on August 4 and 5, 1992.

=== Season standings ===
AL West
Team	W	L	Pct.	GB	Home	Road
Oakland Athletics	96	66	.593	—	51‍–‍30	45‍–‍36
Minnesota Twins	90	72	.556	6	48‍–‍33	42‍–‍39
Chicago White Sox	86	76	.531	10	50‍–‍32	36‍–‍44
Texas Rangers	77	85	.475	19	36‍–‍45	41‍–‍40
California Angels	72	90	.444	24	41‍–‍40	31‍–‍50
Kansas City Royals	72	90	.444	24	44‍–‍37	28‍–‍53
Seattle Mariners	64	98	.395	32	38‍–‍43	26‍–‍55

=== Record vs. opponents ===
1992 American League record Sources:
Team	BAL	BOS	CAL	CWS	CLE	DET	KC	MIL	MIN	NYY	OAK	SEA	TEX	TOR
Baltimore	—	8–5	8–4	6–6	7–6	10–3	8–4	6–7	6–6	5–8	6–6	7–5	7–5	5–8
Boston	5–8	—	8–4	6–6	6–7	4–9	7–5	5–8	3–9	7–6	5–7	6–6	4–8	7–6
California	4–8	4–8	—	3–10	6–6	7–5	8–5	5–7	2–11	7–5	5–8	7–6	9–4	5–7
Chicago	6–6	6–6	10–3	—	7–5	10–2	7–6	5–7	8–5	8–4	5–8	4–9	5–8	5–7
Cleveland	6–7	7–6	6–6	5–7	—	5–8	5–7	5–8	6–6	7–6	6–6	7–5	5–7	6–7
Detroit	3–10	9–4	5–7	2–10	8–5	—	7–5	5–8	3–9	5–8	6–6	9–3	8–4	5–8
Kansas City	4–8	5–7	5–8	6–7	7–5	5–7	—	7–5	6–7	5–7	4–9	7–6	6–7	5–7
Milwaukee	7–6	8–5	7–5	7–5	8–5	8–5	5–7	—	6–6	6–7	7–5	8–4	7–5	8–5
Minnesota	6–6	9–3	11–2	5–8	6–6	9–3	7–6	6–6	—	7–5	5–8	8–5	6–7	5–7
New York	8–5	6–7	5–7	4–8	6–7	8–5	7–5	7–6	5–7	—	6–6	6–6	6–6	2–11
Oakland	6–6	7–5	8–5	8–5	6–6	6–6	9–4	5–7	8–5	6–6	—	12–1	9–4	6–6
Seattle	5–7	6–6	6–7	9–4	5–7	3–9	6–7	4–8	5–8	6–6	1–12	—	4–9	4–8
Texas	5–7	8–4	4–9	8–5	7–5	4–8	7–6	5–7	7–6	6–6	4–9	9–4	—	3–9
Toronto	8–5	6–7	7–5	7–5	7–6	8–5	7–5	5–8	7–5	11–2	6–6	8–4	9–3	—

=== Notable transactions ===
- June 1, 1992: Jason Giambi was drafted by the Athletics in the 2nd round of the 1992 amateur draft. Player signed July 3, 1992.
- June 1, 1992: Brian Lesher was drafted by the Oakland Athletics in the 25th round of the 1992 amateur draft. Player signed June 11, 1992.
- August 31, 1992: José Canseco was traded by the Athletics to the Texas Rangers (during the bottom of the first inning of a game while Canseco was in the on-deck circle, no less) for Rubén Sierra, Jeff Russell, and Bobby Witt.
- August 31, 1992: Shawn Hillegas was signed as a free agent by the Athletics.

=== Roster ===
1992 Oakland Athletics
Roster
Pitchers: 53 John Briscoe; 55 Kevin Campbell; 48 Jim Corsi; 17 Ron Darling; 31 Kelly Downs; 43 Dennis Eckersley; 54 Goose Gossage; 41 Johnny Guzman; 57 Shawn Hillegas; 40 Rick Honeycutt; 26 Vince Horsman; 21 Mike Moore; 19 Gene Nelson; 38 Jeff Parrett; 52 Mike Raczka; 56 Todd Revenig; 23 Jeff Russell; 37 Joe Slusarski; 34 Dave Stewart; 50 Bruce Walton; 35 Bob Welch; 32 Bobby Witt	Catchers: 16,31 Scott Hemond; 39 Henry Mercedes; 6,9 Jamie Quirk; 36 Terry Steinbach; Infielders: 12 Lance Blankenship; 14,46 Mike Bordick; 30 Jerry Browne; 4 Carney Lansford; 25 Mark McGwire; 22 Walt Weiss	Outfielders: 2 Scott Brosius; 33 José Canseco; 28 Eric Fox; 42 Dave Henderson; 24 Rickey Henderson; 23 Dann Howitt; 7 Mike Kingery; 16 Troy Neel; 20 Randy Ready; 29 Rubén Sierra; 6 Willie Wilson; Other Batters: 3 Harold Baines	Manager: 10 Tony La Russa; Coaches: 18 Dave Duncan; 5 Art Kusnyer; 15 Rene Lachemann; 8 Dave McKay; 11 Doug Rader; 47 Tommie Reynolds

== Player stats ==
= Indicates team leader

=== Batting ===
==== Starters by position ====
Note: Pos = Position; G = Games played; AB = At bats; H = Hits; Avg. = Batting average; HR = Home runs; RBI = Runs batted in

Pos	Player	G	AB	H	Avg.	HR	RBI
C	Terry Steinbach	128	438	122	.279	12	53
1B	Mark McGwire	139	467	125	.268	42	104
2B	Mike Bordick	154	504	151	.300	3	48
3B	Carney Lansford	135	496	130	.262	7	75
SS	Walt Weiss	103	316	67	.212	0	21
LF	Rickey Henderson	117	396	112	.283	15	46
CF	Willie Wilson	132	396	107	.270	0	37
RF	José Canseco	97	366	90	.246	22	72
DH	Harold Baines	140	478	121	.253	16	76

==== Other batters ====
Note: G = Games played; AB = At bats; H = Hits; Avg. = Batting average; HR = Home runs; RBI = Runs batted in

Player	G	AB	H	Avg.	HR	RBI
Lance Blankenship	123	349	84	.241	3	34
Jerry Browne	111	324	93	.287	3	40
Jamie Quirk	78	177	39	.220	2	11
Eric Fox	51	143	34	.238	3	13
Randy Ready	61	125	25	.200	3	17
Rubén Sierra	27	101	28	.277	3	17
Scott Brosius	38	87	19	.218	4	13
Dave Henderson	20	63	9	.143	0	2
Troy Neel	24	53	14	.264	3	9
Dann Howitt	22	48	6	.125	1	2
Mike Kingery	12	28	3	.107	0	1
Scott Hemond	17	27	6	.222	0	1
Henry Mercedes	9	5	4	.800	0	1

=== Pitching ===
= Indicates league leader

==== Starting pitchers ====
Note: G = Games pitched; IP = Innings pitched; W = Wins; L = Losses; ERA = Earned run average; SO = Strikeouts

Player	G	IP	W	L	ERA	SO
Mike Moore	36	223.0	17	12	4.12	117
Ron Darling	33	206.1	15	10	3.66	99
Dave Stewart	31	199.1	12	10	3.66	130
Bob Welch	20	123.2	11	7	3.27	47
Joe Slusarski	15	76.0	5	5	5.45	38
Kelly Downs	18	82.0	5	5	3.29	38
Bobby Witt	6	31.2	1	1	3.41	25
John Briscoe	2	7.0	0	1	6.43	4

==== Other pitchers ====
Note: G = Games pitched; IP = Innings pitched; W = Wins; L = Losses; ERA = Earned run average; SO = Strikeouts

Player	G	IP	W	L	ERA	SO
Kevin Campbell	32	65.0	2	3	5.12	38

==== Relief pitchers ====
Note: G = Games pitched; W = Wins; L = Losses; SV = Saves; ERA = Earned run average; SO = Strikeouts

Player	G	W	L	SV	ERA	SO
Dennis Eckersley	69	7	1	51	1.91	93
Jeff Parrett	66	9	1	0	3.02	78
Vince Horsman	58	2	1	1	2.49	18
Rick Honeycutt	54	1	4	3	3.69	32
Jim Corsi	32	4	2	0	1.43	19
Rich Gossage	30	0	2	0	2.84	26
Gene Nelson	28	3	1	0	6.45	26
Jeff Russell	8	2	0	2	0.00	5
Mike Raczka	8	0	0	0	8.53	2
Bruce Walton	7	0	0	0	9.90	7
Shawn Hillegas	5	0	0	0	2.35	3
Johnny Guzmán	2	0	0	0	12.00	0
Todd Revenig	2	0	0	0	0.00	1

== American League Championship Series ==
=== Game 1 ===
October 7, Skydome

Team	1	2	3	4	5	6	7	8	9	R	H	E
Oakland	0	3	0	0	0	0	0	0	1	4	6	1
Toronto	0	0	0	0	1	1	0	1	0	3	9	0
W: Jeff Russell (1–0) L: Jack Morris (0–1) S: Dennis Eckersley (1)
HR: OAK – Mark McGwire (1) Terry Steinbach (1) Harold Baines (1) TOR – Pat Borders (1) Dave Winfield (1)

The first game of the series had Oakland's Dave Stewart face off against Toronto's Jack Morris. The A's put up a three-spot against Morris in the second inning, as Mark McGwire and Terry Steinbach hit back-to-back home runs. Stewart held the Jays scoreless until the fifth, when catcher Pat Borders homered to put Toronto on the board. Dave Winfield added another solo shot for Toronto in the sixth, and in the eighth a base hit by John Olerud scored Winfield to tie the game.

However, Oakland took the lead right back in the top of the ninth, when Harold Baines led off the inning with a solo home run. A's closer Dennis Eckersley then shut down the Jays in the bottom half of the inning to preserve a 4–3 victory and give the Athletics a 1–0 lead in the series.

=== Game 2 ===
October 8, Skydome

Team	1	2	3	4	5	6	7	8	9	R	H	E
Oakland	0	0	0	0	0	0	0	0	1	1	6	0
Toronto	0	0	0	0	2	0	1	0	X	3	4	0
W: David Cone (1–0) L: Mike Moore (0–1) S: Tom Henke (1)
HR: TOR – Kelly Gruber (1)

Game 2 saw Oakland's Mike Moore face the Jays' David Cone. The game was initially a pitchers' duel, as Moore and Cone put up zeroes for the first four innings. In the bottom of the fifth, however, Toronto's Kelly Gruber hit a two-run home run off Moore to give the Jays the lead. In the seventh, Gruber doubled, took third on a grounder, and came home on a Manuel Lee sacrifice fly to extend the Toronto lead to three. The A's avoided a shutout in the top of the ninth, when Rubén Sierra tripled and scored on a single by Baines, but that was all they could muster against Toronto closer Tom Henke. The Jays took the second game and tied the series at a game apiece.

=== Game 3 ===
October 10, Oakland–Alameda County Coliseum

Team	1	2	3	4	5	6	7	8	9	R	H	E
Toronto	0	1	0	1	1	0	2	1	1	7	9	1
Oakland	0	0	0	2	0	0	2	1	0	5	13	3
W: Juan Guzman (1–0) L: Ron Darling (0–1) S: Tom Henke (2)
HR: TOR – Roberto Alomar (1) Candy Maldonado (1)

The series shifted to Oakland for Game 3, as Juan Guzmán took the hill for the Jays while Ron Darling toed the rubber for the A's. Toronto struck in the second, when Winfield reached on an error by Athletics' third baseman Carney Lansford, moved to third on a wild pitch by Darling, and scored on a single by Candy Maldonado. Roberto Alomar hit a solo home run in the fourth to give the Jays a 2–0 lead, but in the bottom half of the inning the A's tied the game with RBI base hits by Baines and Steinbach.

However, the very next inning, Maldonado hit a solo homer of his own, and after Oakland manager Tony La Russa gave Darling the hook in the seventh, the Jays added two unearned runs due to an error by Lance Blankenship and a triple by Lee, making it a 5–2 game. Although the A's cut TO's lead down to a run, the Jays tacked on single runs in the eighth and ninth. Henke retired the Athletics in order in the ninth, giving Toronto a 7–5 victory and a 2–1 edge in the series.

=== Game 4 ===
October 11, Oakland–Alameda County Coliseum

Team	1	2	3	4	5	6	7	8	9	10	11	R	H	E
Toronto	0	1	0	0	0	0	0	3	2	0	1	7	17	4
Oakland	0	0	5	0	0	1	0	0	0	0	0	6	12	2
W: Duane Ward (1–0) L: Kelly Downs (0–1) S: Tom Henke (3)
HR: TOR – John Olerud (1) Roberto Alomar (2)

For the fourth game, Toronto threw Morris against Oakland's Bob Welch. In the second inning, Olerud tagged Welch for a solo homer to give the Jays the lead. However, the Athletics came back in a big way with a five-run third and tacked on another run in the sixth when Sierra doubled Rickey Henderson home, giving Oakland a seemingly secure 6–1 advantage. In the top of the eighth, however, La Russa pulled Welch, who had been cruising along, and went to his bullpen. The Jays capitalized by scoring three runs off hits by Joe Carter, Olerud, and Maldonado, cutting the A's lead to 6–4.

For the top of the ninth, La Russa turned to Eckersley to shut down the top of the Jays' order and tie the series. Although he had given up two of Toronto's three runs in the previous inning, the Oakland closer was still fearsome. Devon White led off with a single to left, and moved to third on an error by Henderson. Roberto Alomar was up next, and he hit a high drive to right field that disappeared behind the wall for a game-tying two-run home run. This turned out to be a crucial point of the series, as it forced the game into extra innings and gave the Jays a chance to win.

Indeed, in the top of the 11th, Toronto came through. Derek Bell walked, moved to third on a Maldonado single, and came home on a sacrifice fly by Borders to give the Jays a 7–6 lead. Henke shut the door on the A's in the bottom of the inning, handing Toronto a 3–1 series lead.

=== Game 5 ===
October 12, Oakland–Alameda County Coliseum

Team	1	2	3	4	5	6	7	8	9	R	H	E
Toronto	0	0	0	1	0	0	1	0	0	2	7	3
Oakland	2	0	1	0	3	0	0	0	X	6	8	0
W: Dave Stewart (1–0) L: David Cone (1-1)
HR: OAK – Rubén Sierra (1) TOR – Dave Winfield (2)

Game 5 pitted Toronto's Cone against Oakland's Stewart. In the bottom of the first, Sierra cracked a two-run home run off Cone, and the next inning an error by Cone proved costly as Henderson got on base and then scored on a single by Jerry Browne. Although Winfield broke the shutout with a homer off Stewart in the fourth, the unearned runs continued to hurt the Jays, as the A's added three runs in the fifth (only one of which was earned) for a 6–1 lead. Toronto managed only one more run in the seventh when White singled Gruber home, and Stewart went the distance as the Athletics took a 6–2 victory and cut the Jays' advantage in the series to 3–2.

=== Game 6 ===
October 14, Skydome

Team	1	2	3	4	5	6	7	8	9	R	H	E
Oakland	0	0	0	0	0	1	0	1	0	2	7	1
Toronto	2	0	4	0	1	0	0	2	X	9	13	0
W: Juan Guzman (2–0) L: Mike Moore (0–2)
HR: TOR – Joe Carter (1) Candy Maldonado (2)

The series came back to Toronto for Game 6, with Guzmán going against Moore. In the bottom of the first, the Jays took a lead they would never relinquish, as White reached on an error by Henderson and scored on a homer by Carter, making it 2–0. In the third, Olerud lashed an RBI double and Maldonado followed with a three-run shot, extending the advantage to 6–0. McGwire put Oakland on the board in the sixth with a single that scored Sierra, but the A's could only manage another run against the Jays. In the ninth, Henke took the mound and induced a flyout from Sierra to end a 9–2 win, making Toronto the first non-U.S.-based team to win a pennant in Major League history.

== Awards and honors ==
- Dennis Eckersley, American League Cy Young Award
- Dennis Eckersley, American League MVP
- Tony La Russa, Associated Press Manager of the Year
- Carney Lansford, Hutch Award
- Mark McGwire, Silver Slugger Award

== Farm system ==
Level	Team	League	Manager
AAA	Tacoma Tigers	Pacific Coast League	Bob Boone
AA	Huntsville Stars	Southern League	Casey Parsons
A	Modesto A's	California League	Ted Kubiak
A	Reno Silver Sox	California League	Gary Jones
A	Madison Muskies	Midwest League	Dick Scott
A-Short Season	Southern Oregon A's	Northwest League	Grady Fuson
Rookie	AZL Athletics	Arizona League	Bruce Hines

LEAGUE CHAMPIONS: AZL Athletics
