= 1991 Oakland Athletics season =

1991 Oakland Athletics
- League: American League
- Division: West
- Ballpark: Oakland–Alameda County Coliseum
- City: Oakland, California
- Record: 84–78 (.519)
- Divisional place: 4th
- Owners: Walter A. Haas, Jr.
- General managers: Sandy Alderson
- Managers: Tony La Russa
- Television: KPIX/KICU-TV (Monte Moore, Ray Fosse); Sports Channel Bay Area (Bill Rigney, Greg Papa, Reggie Jackson)
- Radio: KSFO (Bill King, Lon Simmons, Ray Fosse, Sylvester Jackson)

The Oakland Athletics' 1991 season was the team's 24th in Oakland, California. It was also the 91st season in franchise history. The team finished fourth in the American League West with a record of 84–78.

The 1991 season saw the Athletics' American League dominance come to an abrupt end. Between 1988 and 1990, the team had won three American League pennants and one World Series title; in the process, they won a combined 306 regular season games. In light of these accomplishments, the Athletics were initially favored to win a fourth consecutive American League pennant.

A fourth consecutive World Series appearance, however, was not to be, marking the 1991 Athletics a failed season. In 1991, poor pitching (from both the starting rotation and the bullpen) served to take the Athletics out of contention. From 1988 to 1990, the Athletics had posted a team earned run average (ERA) of roughly 3.24 (easily the American League's best over that span); in 1991, however, they posted a sickly team ERA of 4.57 (the American League's second-worst). Of particular note were the struggles of ace Dave Stewart, whose 1991 ERA (5.18) was more than twice his 1990 ERA (2.56). 1990 Cy Young Award winner Bob Welch fared almost as poorly; his earned run average swelled from 2.95 (1990) to 4.58 (1991). In 1990, he had won a league-high 27 games; in 1991, he won a mere 12.

The Athletics' 1991 campaign, as such, is remembered mainly for the record-breaking exploits of Rickey Henderson. On May 1, he stole his 938th career base; in doing so, he succeeded Lou Brock as MLB's career stolen base leader. Henderson would end the 1991 season with 994 stolen bases.

Oakland would return to contention in 1992 with a record of 96–66. The 1991 season still, however, marked the end of the Athletics as a dynastic power. The 1992 team failed to dominate the league in the manner that the 1988–90 teams had; following that team's six-game ALCS defeat to the Toronto Blue Jays, Oakland wouldn't reach the postseason until 2000. Third baseman Carney Lansford missed most of the season with a knee injury suffered over the winter in a snowmobiling accident.

== Offseason ==
- December 3, 1990: Willie Wilson was signed as a free agent by the Athletics.
- December 4, 1990: Darren Lewis and a player to be named later were traded by the Athletics to the San Francisco Giants for Ernest Riles. The Athletics completed the deal by sending Pedro Pena (minors) to the Giants on December 17.
- December 19, 1990: Scott Sanderson was signed as a free agent by the Athletics.
- December 20, 1990: Ozzie Canseco was released by the Athletics.
- December 31, 1990: Scott Sanderson was purchased from the Athletics by the New York Yankees.
- January 7, 1991: Vance Law was signed as a free agent by the Athletics.
- January 14, 1991: Webster Garrison was signed as a free agent by the Athletics.
- January 15, 1991: Dave Veres was traded by the Athletics to the Los Angeles Dodgers for Kevin Campbell.
- January 16, 1991: Troy Neel was traded by the Cleveland Indians to the Oakland Athletics for Larry Arndt.
- February 8, 1991: Tony Batista was signed by the Oakland Athletics as an amateur free agent.

== Regular season ==
On May 15, 1991, President George H.W. Bush attended a baseball game in Baltimore with Her Majesty, Queen Elizabeth II. The two saw the Oakland Athletics play the Baltimore Orioles for two innings.

=== Opening Day starters ===
- Harold Baines
- José Canseco
- Mike Gallego
- Dave Henderson
- Rickey Henderson
- Mark McGwire
- Ernest Riles
- Terry Steinbach
- Dave Stewart
- Walt Weiss

=== Season standings ===
AL West
Team	W	L	Pct.	GB	Home	Road
Minnesota Twins	95	67	.586	—	51‍–‍30	44‍–‍37
Chicago White Sox	87	75	.537	8	46‍–‍35	41‍–‍40
Texas Rangers	85	77	.525	10	46‍–‍35	39‍–‍42
Oakland Athletics	84	78	.519	11	47‍–‍34	37‍–‍44
Seattle Mariners	83	79	.512	12	45‍–‍36	38‍–‍43
Kansas City Royals	82	80	.506	13	40‍–‍41	42‍–‍39
California Angels	81	81	.500	14	40‍–‍41	41‍–‍40

=== Record vs. opponents ===
1991 American League record Sources:
Team	BAL	BOS	CAL	CWS	CLE	DET	KC	MIL	MIN	NYY	OAK	SEA	TEX	TOR
Baltimore	—	8–5	6–6	4–8	7–6	5–8	4–8	3–10	4–8	5–8	3–9	4–8	9–3	5–8
Boston	5–8	—	4–8	7–5	9–4	5–8	7–5	7–6	3–9	6–7	8–4	9–3	5–7	9–4
California	6–6	8–4	—	8–5	7–5	5–7	9–4	6–6	8–5	6–6	1–12	6–7	5–8	6–6
Chicago	8–4	5–7	5–8	—	6–6	4–8	7–6	7–5	8–5	8–4	7–6	7–6	8–5	7–5
Cleveland	6–7	4–9	5–7	6–6	—	7–6	4–8	5–8	2–10	6–7	5–7	2–10	4–8	1–12
Detroit	8–5	8–5	7–5	8–4	6–7	—	8–4	4–9	4–8	8–5	4–8	8–4	6–6	5–8
Kansas City	8–4	5–7	4–9	6–7	8–4	4–8	—	9–3	6–7	7–5	6–7	7–6	7–6	5–7
Milwaukee	10–3	6–7	6–6	5–7	8–5	9–4	3–9	—	6–6	6–7	8–4	3–9	7–5	6–7
Minnesota	8–4	9–3	5–8	5–8	10–2	8–4	7–6	6–6	—	10–2	8–5	9–4	6–7	4–8
New York	8–5	7–6	6–6	4–8	7–6	5–8	5–7	7–6	2–10	—	6–6	3–9	5–7	6–7
Oakland	9–3	4–8	12–1	6–7	7–5	8–4	7–6	4–8	5–8	6–6	—	6–7	4–9	6–6
Seattle	8–4	3–9	7–6	6–7	10–2	4–8	6–7	9–3	4–9	9–3	7–6	—	5–8	5–7
Texas	3–9	7–5	8–5	5–8	8–4	6–6	6–7	5–7	7–6	7–5	9–4	8–5	—	6–6
Toronto	8–5	4–9	6–6	5–7	12–1	8–5	7–5	7–6	8–4	7–6	6–6	7–5	6–6	—

=== Notable transactions ===
- May 18, 1991: Andy Hawkins was signed as a free agent by the Athletics.
- July 26, 1991: Lee Tinsley and Apolinar Garcia (minors) were traded by the Athletics to the Cleveland Indians for Brook Jacoby.
- July 31, 1991: Matt Grott and Russell Cormier (minors) were traded by the Athletics to the Montreal Expos for Ron Darling.
- August 5, 1991: Mark Acre was signed by the Oakland Athletics as an amateur free agent.
- August 20, 1991: Andy Hawkins was released by the Athletics.

==== Draft picks ====
- June 3, 1991: Scott Sheldon was drafted by the Oakland Athletics in the 8th round of the 1991 amateur draft. Player signed June 5, 1991.
- June 3, 1991: Damon Mashore was drafted by the Oakland Athletics in the 9th round of the 1991 amateur draft. Player signed June 5, 1991.
- June 3, 1991: George Williams was drafted by the Oakland Athletics in the 24th round of the 1991 amateur draft. Player signed June 10, 1991.

=== Roster ===
1991 Oakland Athletics
Roster
Pitchers: 38 Dana Allison; 53 John Briscoe; 54 Todd Burns; 55 Kevin Campbell; 17 Ron Darling; 22 Kirk Dressendorfer; 43 Dennis Eckersley; 45 Johnny Guzman; 32 Reggie Harris; 41 Andy Hawkins; 40 Rick Honeycutt; 58 Joe Klink; 21 Mike Moore; 19 Gene Nelson; 30 Eric Show; 37 Joe Slusarski; 34 Dave Stewart; 59 Todd Van Poppel; 50 Bruce Walton; 35 Bob Welch; 29 Curt Young	Catchers: 52 Troy Afenir; 31 Scott Hemond; 6 Jamie Quirk; 36 Terry Steinbach; Infielders: 12 Lance Blankenship; 46 Mike Bordick; 45 Scott Brosius; 9 Mike Gallego; 26 Brook Jacoby; 4 Carney Lansford; 2 Vance Law; 14 Fred Manrique; 25 Mark McGwire; 11 Ernest Riles; 22 Walt Weiss; 57 Ron Witmeyer	Outfielders: 33 José Canseco; 42 Dave Henderson; 24 Rickey Henderson; 23 Dann Howitt; 13 Doug Jennings; 48 Brad Komminsk; 16 Willie Wilson; Other Batters: 3 Harold Baines	Manager: 10 Tony La Russa; Coaches: 20 Rick Burleson; 18 Dave Duncan; 5 Art Kusnyer; 15 Rene Lachemann; 8 Dave McKay; 47 Tommie Reynolds

=== Rickey Henderson's stolen base record ===
On May 1, 1991, Henderson broke one of baseball's most famous records when he stole the 939th base of his career, one more than Lou Brock. However, Henderson's achievement was somewhat overshadowed because Nolan Ryan, at age 44, set a record that same night by throwing a no-hitter against Toronto, the seventh of his career. Two years earlier, Ryan had previously achieved glory at Henderson's expense by making him his 5,000th strikeout victim. Henderson took an odd delight in the occurrence, saying, "If you haven't been struck out by Nolan Ryan, you're nobody."

Rickey's speech (at right) after breaking Lou Brock's all-time steals record sounds like the standard victory/award speech. Henderson thanked God and his mother, as well as the people that helped him in baseball. All that is remembered, however, is the "I am the greatest of all time" quote, which has been taken by many to support the notion that Henderson is selfish and arrogant. Years later, Henderson revealed that he had gone over his planned remarks ahead of time with Brock, and the Cardinals Hall of Famer "had no problem with it. In fact, he helped me write what I was going to say that day."

=== Catfish Hunter's number retired ===
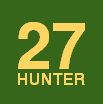
Catfish Hunter's number 27 was retired by the Oakland Athletics in 1991.

Jim "Catfish" Hunter's number 27 was retired by the Athletics in a pre-game ceremony on June 9, the first in the franchise's 90 years. Inducted into the National Baseball Hall of Fame in Cooperstown in 1987, the right-handed starter won 161 regular season games in ten seasons for the A's, the first three in Kansas City and the last seven in Oakland. He won 20 or more games in each of his last four seasons in Oakland and was 4–0 with one save in seven World Series appearances. Hunter won the Cy Young Award in his final season in Oakland in 1974, as the A's won their third consecutive World Series. His record in the 1974 regular season was 25–12 with 23 complete games; he led the league in wins and earned run average (2.49). Six years earlier in the first season in Oakland in 1968, Hunter threw the first perfect game in franchise history on May 8 at home (and also had three hits and three runs batted in).

== Player stats ==
= Indicates team leader

=== Batting ===
==== Starters by position ====
Note: Pos = Position; G = Games played; AB = At bats; H = Hits; Avg. = Batting average; HR = Home runs; RBI = Runs batted in

Pos	Player	G	AB	H	Avg.	HR	RBI
C	Terry Steinbach	129	456	125	.274	6	67
1B	Mark McGwire	154	483	97	.201	22	75
2B	Mike Gallego	159	482	119	.247	12	49
3B	Ernest Riles	108	281	60	.214	5	32
SS	Mike Bordick	90	235	56	.238	0	21
LF	Rickey Henderson	134	470	126	.268	18	57
CF	Dave Henderson	150	572	158	.276	25	85
RF	José Canseco	154	572	152	.266	44	122
DH	Harold Baines	141	488	144	.295	20	90

==== Other batters ====
Note: G = Games played; AB = At bats; H = Hits; Avg. = Batting average; HR = Home runs; RBI = Runs batted in

Player	G	AB	H	Avg.	HR	RBI
Willie Wilson	113	294	70	.238	0	28
Jamie Quirk	76	203	53	.261	1	17
Brook Jacoby	56	188	40	.213	0	20
Lance Blankenship	90	185	46	.249	3	21
Vance Law	74	134	28	.209	0	9
Walt Weiss	40	133	30	.226	0	13
Scott Brosius	36	68	16	.235	2	4
Dann Howitt	21	42	7	.167	1	3
Brad Komminsk	24	25	3	.120	0	2
Scott Hemond	23	23	5	.217	0	0
Fred Manrique	9	21	3	.143	0	0
Ron Witmeyer	11	19	1	.053	0	0
Carney Lansford	5	16	1	.063	0	1
Troy Afenir	5	11	1	.091	0	0
Doug Jennings	8	9	1	.111	0	0

=== Pitching ===
==== Starting pitchers ====
Note: G = Games pitched, IP = Innings pitched; W = Wins, L = Losses; ERA = Earned run average; SO = Strikeouts

Player	G	IP	W	L	ERA	SO
Dave Stewart	35	226.0	11	11	5.18	144
Bob Welch	35	220.0	12	13	4.58	101
Mike Moore	33	210.0	17	8	2.96	153
Joe Slusarski	20	109.1	5	7	5.27	60
Andy Hawkins	15	77.0	4	4	4.79	40
Ron Darling	12	75.0	3	7	4.08	60
Kirk Dressendorfer	7	34.2	3	3	5.45	17
Todd Van Poppel	1	4.2	0	0	9.64	6

==== Other pitchers ====
Note: G = Games pitched; IP = Innings pitched; W = Wins; L = Losses; ERA = Earned run average; SO = Strikeouts

Player	G	IP	W	L	ERA	SO
Eric Show	23	51.2	1	2	5.92	20

==== Relief pitchers ====
Note: G = Games pitched; W = Wins; L = Losses; SV = Saves; ERA = Earned run average; SO = Strikeouts

Player	G	W	L	SV	ERA	SO
Dennis Eckersley	67	5	4	43	2.96	87
Joe Klink	62	10	3	2	4.35	34
Steve Chitren	56	1	4	4	4.33	47
Gene Nelson	44	1	5	0	6.84	23
Rick Honeycutt	43	2	4	0	3.58	26
Curt Young	41	4	2	0	5.00	27
Kevin Campbell	14	1	0	0	2.74	16
Bruce Walton	12	1	0	0	6.23	10
John Briscoe	11	0	0	0	7.07	9
Dana Allison	11	1	1	0	7.36	4
Todd Burns	9	1	0	0	3.38	3
Johnny Guzmán	5	1	0	0	9.00	3
Reggie Harris	2	0	0	0	12.00	2
Vance Law	1	0	0	0	0.00	0

== Farm system ==
Level	Team	League	Manager
AAA	Tacoma Tigers	Pacific Coast League	Jeff Newman
AA	Huntsville Stars	Southern League	Casey Parsons
A	Modesto A's	California League	Ted Kubiak
A	Madison Muskies	Midwest League	Gary Jones
A-Short Season	Southern Oregon A's	Northwest League	Grady Fuson
Rookie	AZL Athletics	Arizona League	Dick Scott

LEAGUE CHAMPIONS: AZL Athletics
