= Gladeon M. Barnes =

US Army general (1887–1961)

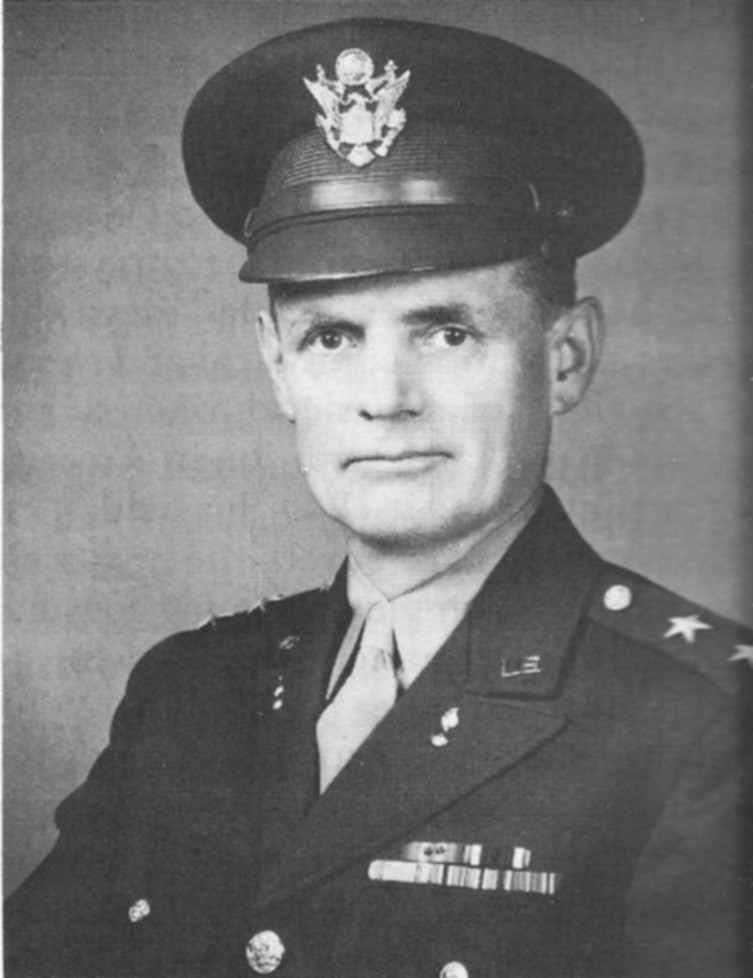
- Born: Gladeon Marcus Barnes; 15 June 1887; Vermontville, Michigan, United States
- Died: 15 November 1961 (aged 74); Washington, D.C., United States
- Burial place: Arlington National Cemetery, Arlington County, Virginia, United States
- Education: University of Michigan
- Military career
- Allegiance: United States of America
- Branch: United States Army
- Service years: 1910–1946
- Rank: Major general
- Conflicts: World War I World War II
- Awards: Army Distinguished Service Medal; Legion of Merit; Elliott Cresson Medal

Gladeon Marcus Barnes (15 June 1887 – 15 November 1961) was a United States Army major general who, as Chief of Research and Engineering in the Ordnance Department, was responsible for the development of 1,600 different weapons. He is best known for his involvement in the development of the M4 Sherman and the M26 Pershing tanks, as well as the ENIAC computer.

== Early life and education ==
Barnes was born in Vermontville, Michigan on 15 June 1887. He attended Hastings High School, from which he graduated in 1906. He entered the University of Michigan, graduating with a Bachelor of Civil Engineering degree in 1910. The University of Michigan later awarded him an honorary Master of Civil Engineering degree in 1941.

== Career ==
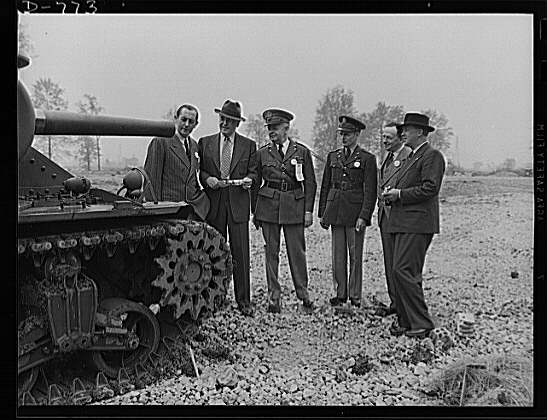
Inspecting the M3 Lee tank being manufactured at the Detroit Arsenal, May 1941. From left, Clive Baillieu of the British Purchasing Commission; A. R. Glancy of the Office of Production Management; Brigadier General B. O. Lewis; Brigadier General Gladeon M. Barnes; and Rear Admiral H. A. Sheridan of the British Royal Navy.

Commissioned in the Coast Artillery Corps in 1910, Barnes transferred to the Ordnance Department in 1913. He was promoted to captain in September 1916. During World War I, he was responsible for the design of coastal and railway artillery. Between the wars, he served in Germany and Italy. He attended the Army Industrial College, from which he graduated in 1936, and the Army War College, from which he graduated in 1938. He then became the Chief of the Research and Engineering Office of the Ordnance Department. Having witnessed the power of German tanks in the Spanish Civil War, he designed the 37 mm Gun M3, a light but powerful anti-tank gun. Barnes was promoted to brigadier general in October 1940, and major general in March 1943. As such, he was responsible for the research, development and standardization of 1,600 different weapons. Around $50 billion was spent on them. Barnes sought to develop medium and heavy tanks, but was stymied by the technical capability of American industry at the time, particularly its inability to develop a sufficiently powerful engine. He pressed, without success, for diesel engines, and for the adoption of the M6 heavy tank.

The M3 Lee tank had a 37 mm gun in the turret, and a 75 mm gun mounted in a sponson, an awkward compromise, made worse when the barrel was shortened. On its own initiative, Barnes commenced the design of a successor. The problems of casting a large turret and working with armor plate were overcome, and the result was the M4 Sherman. In August 1942, he went to London as part of an American Technical Mission, and from 14 December 1942 to 28 January 1943, he accompanied Lieutenant General Jacob L. Devers, the Chief of the Armored Force, on an inspection tour of the battlefields in North Africa.

Barnes enthusiastically endorsed the M1 Rocket Launcher after seeing a makeshift prototype in a demonstration at the Aberdeen Proving Ground in May 1942. After firing the new weapon himself, Barnes commented: "It sure looks like Bob Burns' bazooka". Bob Burns was a popular radio comedian, who used a novelty musical instrument which he had devised himself and called a "bazooka". The name stuck and is still in use as a generic term referring to any ground-to-ground shoulder-fired missile weapon.

Well aware of the dangers posed by German armor, Barnes was instrumental in getting the 90 mm gun in the M36 tank destroyer and getting them shipped to Europe over the opposition of the Army Ground Forces, which believed that the 75 and 76 mm guns were adequate. However, he did not approve of the idea of mounting a 90 mm in the Sherman; rather, he sought to develop a better tank. The T20 Medium Tank, developed in May 1942, was faster, with more armor and a lower silhouette than the Sherman. Further development work led to the T23, which incorporated an electrical transmission. The electrical transmission made the tank easier to operate, but at a cost in weight and maintenance, and was therefore rejected by the Army Ground Forces. He therefore reverted to conventional transmissions for the improved T25 and T26 models, mounting the 90 mm gun, which would eventually become the M26 Pershing.

In January 1944, Devers, now commanding ETOUSA, ordered 250 of the new T25 and T26 tanks, but as late as April 1944 Army Ground Forces was suggesting that they be armed with 75 and 76 mm guns. In the Battle of Normandy, American armor came up against the Tiger I, Tiger II and Panther tanks in large numbers, and the limitations of M4 Sherman and the 75 and 76 mm guns became painfully apparent. The New York Times and The Washington Post described the failure to develop better tanks a scandal. Barnes insisted that 20 of the first 40 T26s off the assembly line be shipped directly to Europe rather than conducting further tests at Fort Knox that the Army Ground Forces wanted. They arrived in January 1945, and in February a special mission headed by Barnes known as the Zebra Mission went to Europe to instruct tank crews in their use and get the tanks into action as quickly as possible. They found that in the wake of the Battle of the Bulge, tank crews regarded 75 mm Shermans as death traps.

In 1943, Barnes launched a secret project to create an enormous electronic computer, which came to be called ENIAC. He supervised its development by the researchers at the University of Pennsylvania. Costing over $500,000, it used 17,000 glass vacuum tubes, occupied 1,800 square feet (170 m^{2}) and weighed nearly 30 short tons (27 t). Barnes pressed the button that started it working at the formal dedication ceremony on 15 February 1946. While it was too late to perform ballistic calculations for World War II, John von Neumann put it to work performing the complex calculations required by the hydrogen bomb. In April 1946, Barnes was chosen as the chairman of a committee appointed to oversee experimental firing of 25 captured German V-2 rockets. For his services during the war he was awarded the Distinguished Service Medal and the Legion of Merit.

== Later life and death ==
Barnes retired from the U.S. Army in April 1946, and commenced a second career as vice president of research at Budd Company. He retired from this in 1952. He died at Walter Reed Hospital on 15 November 1961. He was survived by his wife Evelyn née Kopf, and his daughter, Barbara. He was buried in Arlington National Cemetery.
