= Mickey Tettleton =

American baseball player (born 1960)

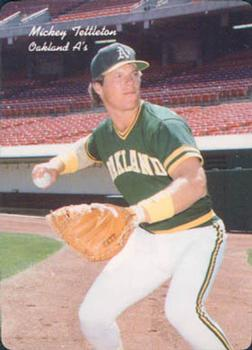
- Catcher
- Born: September 16, 1960 (age 65); Oklahoma City, Oklahoma, U.S.
- Batted: Switch Threw: Right

MLB debut
- June 30, 1984, for the Oakland Athletics

Last MLB appearance
- July 2, 1997, for the Texas Rangers

MLB statistics
- Batting average: .241
- Home runs: 245
- Runs batted in: 732
- Stats at Baseball Reference

Teams
- Oakland Athletics (1984–1987); Baltimore Orioles (1988–1990); Detroit Tigers (1991–1994); Texas Rangers (1995–1997)

Career highlights and awards
- 2× All-Star (1989, 1994); 3× Silver Slugger Award (1989, 1991, 1992)

Mickey Lee Tettleton (born September 16, 1960) is an American former professional baseball player. He played in Major League Baseball for the Oakland Athletics, Baltimore Orioles, Detroit Tigers, and Texas Rangers. Although Tettleton played mostly as a catcher, he also played as a first baseman, an outfielder, and as a designated hitter.

A two-time All-Star, Tettleton was considered one of the best-hitting catchers of his era, winning three Silver Slugger Awards. His powerful hitting was highlighted when he became only the fifth player in major league history to hit two home runs over the right field roof of Tiger Stadium and, in 1992 he became the first player to hit a ball onto Eutaw Street which runs behind right field at Baltimore's Camden Yards.

Tettleton is the manager for the collegiate summer team the Danville Otterbots and has coached college players since 2019.

== Amateur career ==
Tettleton was born in Oklahoma City and was named after Baseball Hall of Fame member and fellow Oklahoman Mickey Mantle. Like Mantle, Tettleton was a switch hitter and was recognized for having an unusual batting stance: he stood almost straight up at the plate, holding his bat horizontal and bending only when the pitcher began his delivery. He was also distinguished by the huge wad of chewing tobacco he kept in his cheek during games, as well as his claim that Froot Loops were the source of his hitting power.

Tettleton attended Southeast High School in Oklahoma City before enrolling at Oklahoma State University. In 1980, he played collegiate summer baseball with the Wareham Gatemen of the Cape Cod Baseball League. He played for the Oklahoma State Cowboys baseball team that reached the finals in the 1981 College World Series, before losing to the Arizona State Sun Devils. Tettleton was named to the 1981 College World Series All-Tournament Team as an outfielder.

== Professional career ==
=== Oakland Athletics ===
Tettleton was drafted by the Oakland Athletics in the fifth round of the 1981 Major League Baseball draft. He spent three seasons in the minor leagues playing for the Modesto Athletics of the California League. He began the 1984 season with the Double-A Albany A's but was promoted to the major leagues in June when Athletics catcher Jim Essian suffered a broken hand. Tettleton made his major league debut with Oakland on June 30, 1984, at the age of 23. He served as a backup catcher to Mike Heath until December 1985, when the Athletics traded Heath and Tim Conroy to the St. Louis Cardinals for Joaquín Andújar, keeping Tettleton as their starting catcher.

Tettleton was given the starting catcher's job for the 1986 season, but his offensive statistics failed to impress. He posted a .204 batting average in 90 games, along with 10 home runs and 35 runs batted in (RBI). His defensive abilities were termed as adequate. By the end of the season, Athletics manager Tony La Russa had Tettleton platooning with the left-hand hitting catcher, Jerry Willard. Tettleton began the 1987 season as the Athletics starting catcher. However, injuries and weak hitting limited him to 82 games, as newcomer Terry Steinbach began to make a positive impression. He ended the year with a dismal .194 batting average. On March 28, 1988, the Athletics released Tettleton during spring training. On April 5, he signed a contract to play for the Rochester Red Wings in the Baltimore Orioles organisation.

=== Baltimore Orioles ===
Tettleton started the season in Rochester but was soon called back to the major leagues, where he shared catching duties with Terry Kennedy in 1988, and improved his batting average significantly to .261. 1989 was a breakout year for Tettleton as he started the season hitting 13 home runs in April and May, setting a new major league record for catchers. He hit 20 home runs by midseason, earning him a place as a reserve player for the American League team in the 1989 All-Star Game. In August, Tettleton underwent surgery to remove a cyst from his left knee and missed almost one month. He finished the season with a .258 batting average, 26 home runs, 65 RBI, and an impressive .369 on-base percentage, helping the Orioles improve from last place in the American League East in 1988 to second place in 1989, two games behind the Toronto Blue Jays. Tettleton's hitting performance earned him the 1989 American League Silver Slugger Award.

Tettleton's offensive output dropped in 1990 with a .223 batting average, 15 home runs, and 51 RBI. Although he struck out 160 times, setting a major league strikeout record for switch hitters, his on-base percentage increased from the previous year to .376, in part due to the 106 walks. In October, he was selected to the Associated Press All-Star team. At the end of the year, Tettleton opted for free agency, then surprised the Orioles by accepting their salary arbitration offer. They had expected him to accept a higher offer from another team and were not prepared to pay him more than $1 million. Two days after acquiring high-priced players Glenn Davis and Dwight Evans, the Orioles traded Tettleton to the Detroit Tigers for pitcher Jeff Robinson in what was seen as a cost-saving measure on the part of the Orioles.

=== Detroit Tigers ===
Tettleton's batting rebounded in 1991, producing his highest home run totals, including a stretch in late June when he hit 7 home runs in seven games. He also became only the fifth player in major league history to hit two home runs over the right field roof of Tiger Stadium. By the end of the season, he had compiled a .263 batting average with 31 home runs, 89 RBI, and a .387 on-base percentage, earning his second Silver Slugger Award and helping the Tigers to finish second in the American League East Division. In October, he was selected to the Associated Press All-Star team for a second time. On October 27, 1991, the Tigers rewarded his performance by signing him to a three-year contract worth $8.5 million.

Tettleton had another productive year in 1992. On April 20, he became the first player to hit a ball onto Eutaw Street which runs behind right field at Baltimore's Camden Yards. In a poll of American League managers prior to the 1992 All-Star Game, Tettleton came out on top as their choice to be the starting All-Star catcher. However, the fans voted for Sandy Alomar Jr. Tettleton produced a .238 batting average, a career-high 32 home runs, 83 RBI, a .379 on-base percentage, and led the American League with 122 walks, to win his third Silver Slugger Award. He also led American League catchers with a .996 fielding percentage, committing only 2 errors in 113 games as a catcher. In a 1992 computer ranking of major league players, which used offensive and defensive statistics over the previous two seasons, Tettleton was ranked first among American League catchers. In October, he was selected as the catcher for the Sporting News American League All-Star team.

Tettleton continued to produce respectable offensive statistics in 1993. By midseason, he was tied with Barry Bonds for the major league home run lead of 24, along with 73 RBI, yet he was once again snubbed by fans in the voting for the 1993 All-Star Game. American League manager Cito Gaston also received criticism for failing to select Tettleton as a reserve player. To get more bats in the lineup, Detroit manager Sparky Anderson began to use Tettleton at other positions: he played 59 games as a first baseman, 56 games as a catcher, and 55 games as an outfielder. He ended the season with a .245 batting average and a .372 on-base percentage, along with 32 home runs and a career-high 110 RBI, helping the Tigers lead the American League in runs for the second consecutive year.

Tettleton had 14 home runs and 41 RBI at the All-Star break in 1994, and Gaston selected him as a reserve player in the 1994 All-Star Game, perhaps to make amends for the previous year's snub. He continued to play as a first baseman and an outfielder; however, the majority of his games were played as catcher until the season ended prematurely when major league players decided to go on strike in August. In the final year of his contract with the Tigers, Tettleton's offensive statistics dropped to a .248 average with 17 home runs and 51 RBI, although he posted a career-high .419 on-base percentage.

=== Texas Rangers ===
Tettleton was granted free agency, and in April 1995, he signed a one-year contract for $550,000 to play for the Texas Rangers. With Iván Rodríguez having a secure hold on the Rangers' catching job, Tettleton played mostly as a right fielder and designated hitter. He posted a .238 batting average and matched his career high with 32 home runs along with 72 RBI.

In December 1995, he turned down a lucrative offer from the New York Yankees and chose to remain with the Rangers, signing a two-year contract worth $2.5 million. He continued to play mostly as a designated hitter and occasional first baseman, ending the year with a .246 average, 24 home runs, and 83 RBI, to help the Rangers clinch the 1996 American League West Division title. In the 1996 American League Division Series against the New York Yankees, Tettleton struggled in the only post-season appearance of his career, striking out seven times and hitting for just an .083 batting average, as the Rangers lost the series in four games.

Playing exclusively as a designated hitter in 1997, he was hitting for just a .091 average in 17 games when he announced his retirement in July at the age of 36.

=== Career statistics ===
In a 13-year major league career, Tettleton played in 1,485 games, accumulating 1,132 hits in 4,698 at bats, for a .241 career batting average, along with 245 home runs, 732 RBI, and a .369 on-base percentage. He retired with a .991 fielding percentage in 872 games as a catcher, a .979 fielding percentage in 142 games as an outfielder, and a .986 fielding percentage in 125 games as a first baseman.

Tettleton hit over 30 home runs four times in his career, and was also known for his patience at the plate, accumulating 949 career walks. He led the American League in 1992 with 122 walks and finished in the top ten in six other seasons, including second three times. But his selective style at the plate, combined with his power-hitting mentality, led to Tettleton's 1,307 career strike-outs, 160th on baseball's all-time list as of 2024.

At the time of his retirement, Tettleton ranked eighth in major league history in career home runs by a switch hitter. He is tied with Nick Swisher for 22nd most among switch hitters, as of 2024. Tettleton's .369 career on-base percentage ranks 29th all-time among major league catchers, and his .821 on-base plus slugging percentage is 23rd all-time among major league catchers.

Baseball writer Bill James ranked Tettleton 37th all-time among major league catchers in his 2001 book, The Bill James Historical Baseball Abstract.

== Coaching career ==
In 2019, Tettleton was named assistant coach at Oklahoma Christian University and also served as hitting coach for the Chatham Anglers of the Cape Cod Baseball League. He was no longer a coach at Oklahoma Christian in the 2021 season.

In 2023, he was the hitting coach of the collegiate summer team the Greeneville Flyboys. He was named the manager of the Danville Otterbots before the 2024 season.

== Personal life ==
Tettleton and his wife Shannon, have two children – Shannee Faye and Tate Dean. Mickey has 2 other children from an ex-wife, Tyler and Jessica.

In 1994, Tettleton made a cameo appearance as himself in the baseball film Little Big League.

== See also ==
- List of Major League Baseball career home run leaders
