= Hastings High School (Michigan) =

Location
- 520 W South Street; Hastings, Michigan 49058; United States; 42.6378°N 85.2946°W

Information
- School type: Public, high school
- Motto: Home of the Saxons
- Established: 1877
- School district: Hastings Area School System
- Principal: Teresa Heide
- Teaching staff: 42.50 (FTE)
- Grades: 9-12
- Enrollment: 780 (2023–2024)
- Student to teacher ratio: 18.35
- Campus type: Rural
- Colors: Blue & gold
- Mascot: Saxon
- Website: hs.hassk12.org/o/hhs

Hastings High School is a public secondary school in Hastings, Michigan, United States, serving students in grades 9–12. The school is part of the Hastings Area School System, which includes one junior high school and four elementary schools.

== History ==
In 1877, the first graduating class of Hastings High School included only five students.

=== New building ===
From 1917 to 1970, Hastings High School students attended classes at 232 W Grand Street. That address is now home to Hastings Middle School. Students began attending classes in the new building at 520 W South Street on September 3, 1970. "At the time of its opening, funds were approved to put all academic classrooms on a twenty-five to one pupil/teacher ratio," a major educational accomplishment achieved by few Michigan districts at that time. The school contains one hundred thirty-two rooms including a gymnasium, library, cafeteria, and lecture hall.

== Athletics ==
Hastings High School offers a number of extracurricular athletics, including:

- Baseball
- Basketball – boys/girls
- Competitive cheer
- Cross country – boys/girls
- Football
- Golf – boys/girls
- Hockey
- Sideline cheer
- Soccer – boys/girls
- Softball
- Swimming – boys/girls
- Tennis – boys/girls
- Track – boys/girls
- Volleyball
- Wrestling

== Notable alumni ==
- Dann Howitt, Major League Baseball player for the Oakland Athletics, Seattle Mariners, and the Chicago White Sox. Howitt was the last player to get a hit off of Hall of Fame pitcher Nolan Ryan – a grand slam home run.
- Gladeon M. Barnes, U.S. Army major general who led efforts to develop the Sherman and Pershing tanks as well as ENIAC, the first electronic general-purpose computer.
- Angela Rigas, politician
