= Dan Gakeler =

American baseball player (born 1964)

- Pitcher
- Born: May 1, 1964 (age 61); Mount Holly, New Jersey, U.S.
- Batted: Right Threw: Right

MLB debut
- June 9, 1991, for the Detroit Tigers

Last MLB appearance
- October 5, 1991, for the Detroit Tigers

MLB statistics
- Win–loss record: 1–4
- Earned run average: 5.74
- Strikeouts: 43
- Stats at Baseball Reference

Teams
- Detroit Tigers (1991)

Daniel Michael Gakeler (born May 1, 1964) is an American former Major League Baseball pitcher. Although he spent eleven seasons in the minor league organizations of three teams, he would spend just one season on a big league roster for the Detroit Tigers in 1991.

Gakeler attended Rancocas Valley Regional High School in Mount Holly, New Jersey.
