= Mike Dalton (baseball) =

American baseball player (born 1963)

- Pitcher
- Born: March 27, 1963 (age 61); Palo Alto, California
- Batted: Right Threw: Left

MLB debut
- May 31, 1991, for the Detroit Tigers

Last MLB appearance
- June 15, 1991, for the Detroit Tigers

MLB statistics
- Win–loss record: 0–0
- Earned run average: 3.38
- Strikeouts: 4

Teams
- Detroit Tigers (1991)

Michael Edward Dalton (born March 27, 1963) is a former pitcher for the Detroit Tigers in 1991. Dalton threw left-handed and batted right-handed. He was drafted by the Boston Red Sox in the 15th round of the 1983 amateur draft, after playing for De Anza College in Cupertino, California. After spending a few years in the minor leagues, on December 19, 1990, he signed as a free agent with the Tigers.

The next season Dalton made his major league debut with Detroit on May 31, 1991, against the Cleveland Indians. He pitched 1.3 innings and gave up one hit. He went on to pitch in three more games that season, ending the year with 8 innings, 4 strikeouts, 2 walks, and a 3.38 ERA. After the year, he signed a contract with the Pittsburgh Pirates, but never made it to the major league club.
