= Mike Raczka =

American baseball player (born 1962)

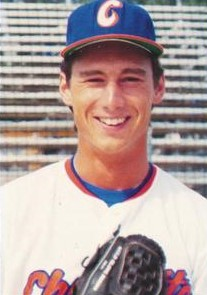
- Pitcher
- Born: November 16, 1962 (age 63); New Britain, Connecticut, U.S.
- Batted: Left Threw: Left

MLB debut
- August 15, 1992, for the Oakland Athletics

Last MLB appearance
- September 23, 1992, for the Oakland Athletics

MLB statistics
- Win–loss record: 0–0
- Earned run average: 8.53
- Strikeouts: 2
- Stats at Baseball Reference

Teams
- Oakland Athletics (1992)

Michael Raczka (born November 16, 1962) is an American former Major League Baseball pitcher. Raczka played for the Oakland Athletics in the 1992 season.

== Amateur career ==
A native of New Britain, Connecticut, Raczka attended the University of New Haven. In 1982 and 1983, he played collegiate summer baseball in the Cape Cod Baseball League for the Yarmouth-Dennis Red Sox. He was selected by the Baltimore Orioles in the 5th round of the 1984 amateur draft.

== Professional career ==
Raczka made his major league debut for Oakland on August 15, 1992. He appeared in eight games for the Athletics that season, his only major league campaign.
