= Dana Allison =

American baseball player (born 1966)

- Pitcher
- Born: August 14, 1966 (age 59); Front Royal, Virginia, U.S.
- Batted: Right Threw: Left

MLB debut
- April 12, 1991, for the Oakland Athletics

Last MLB appearance
- May 23, 1991, for the Oakland Athletics

MLB statistics
- Win–loss record: 1–1
- Earned run average: 7.39
- Strikeouts: 4
- Stats at Baseball Reference

Teams
- Oakland Athletics (1991)

Dana Eric Allison (born August 14, 1966) is an American former professional baseball player whose playing career spanned six seasons, including a part of one in Major League Baseball with the Oakland Athletics (1991). Allison was a pitcher over his career. During his time in the majors, Allison went 1–1 with a 7.39 earned run average (ERA) and four strikeouts in 11 games, all in relief. He also played in the minor leagues with the Class-A Short Season Southern Oregon A's (1989), the Class-A Madison Muskies (1989), the Class-A Advanced Modesto A's (1990), the Double-A Huntsville Stars (1990, 1992–1993) and the Triple-A Tacoma Tigers (1990–1994). Before playing professionally, Allison was a member of the James Madison Dukes baseball team while attending James Madison University.

== Amateur career ==
Allison attended Warren County High School in Front Royal, Virginia. After high school, Allison enrolled at James Madison University where he played baseball with the school's team. Allison attended James Madison from 1986 to 1989. During the 14^{th} round of the 1988 Major League Baseball draft, the Los Angeles Dodgers selected Allison, but he was not signed by the club and instead returned to school. In the 1989 Major League Baseball draft, Allison was selected by the Oakland Athletics in the 21^{st} round and later signed a professional contract with them.

During his time at James Madison, Allison was named the Colonial Athletic Association (CCA) Player of the Year and All-American in 1988; was a two-time All-CCA selection; and is in the top-five for career wins (25), complete games (23) and strikeouts in James Madison Dukes history. As a part of the 25^{th} anniversary of the CCA, they released a "Silver Anniversary Team" for baseball featuring Allison and other players who have had a significant contribution to CCA baseball over its history. In 1991, after making his major league debut, Allison became the second attendee of James Madison University to do so (behind Billy Sample in 1978).

== Professional career ==
After being selected by the Oakland Athletics in the 1989 Major League Baseball draft, Allison was assigned to the Class-A Short Season Southern Oregon A's. With Southern Oregon, Allison pitched in 11 games and went 0–2 with a 1.84 earned run average (ERA). Later during the 1989 season, Allison was called up to the Class-A Madison Muskies, where he went 2–3 with a 1.12 ERA in 13 games, all in relief. In 1990, Allison played for their team; the Class-A Advanced Modesto A's, the Double-A Huntsville Stars and the Triple-A Tacoma Tigers. With Modesto, Allison went without a decision while compiling a 2.33 ERA and four saves in 10 games, all in relief. Allison played 35 games at the Double-A level that season and went 7–1 with a 2.39 ERA and two saves. Finally, at the Triple-A level that season, Allison pitched in two games giving-up no runs.

Before the 1990 season, Allison re-signed a minor league contract with the Athletics. He attended spring training with the Athletics that season. Allison's contract was purchased by the Athletics on April 9, meaning he had been called up to play in Major League Baseball. He made his major league debut on April 12, against the Seattle Mariners, pitching 1/3 of an inning, walking one and giving-up no runs. Allison's first win came on April 14 against the Mariners, pitching one inning, giving-up no runs. In the majors that season, Allison went 1–1 with a 7.36 ERA and four strikeouts in 11 games, all in relief. On May 28, Allison was optioned to Triple-A Tacoma after the Athletics activated pitcher Dave Stewart. Allison spent the rest of the 1991 season with Tacoma, going 3–1 with a 4.37 ERA and 13 strikeouts in 18 games, all in relief.

Allison spent the 1992 season with the Double-A Huntsville Stars and the Triple-A Tacoma Tigers. With the Stars, he went 4–1 with a 2.93 ERA, one save and 40 strikeouts in 22 games, six starts. During his time in Tacoma that season, Allison went 2–3 with a 4.84 ERA and 17 strikeouts in 19 games, four starts. Allison spent his final season as a player in professional baseball in 1994. He played with the Triple-A Tacoma Tigers that season, going 10–8 with a 5.78 ERA, two complete games, two shutouts and 60 strikeouts in 33 games, 21 starts. Allison led all Tacoma pitchers in wins.

== Personal life ==
Allison is the son of Calvin Coolidge Allison Jr. (b. 1943) and his wife, Nina Eloise (née Smith, b. 1944). Aside from his father and grandfather being named after a President of the United States, his 2nd great-uncle Grover Cleveland Glascock is as well.

His fifth cousin three times removed is former Major League player Jack Glasscock.
