= Milt Cuyler =

American baseball player (born 1968)

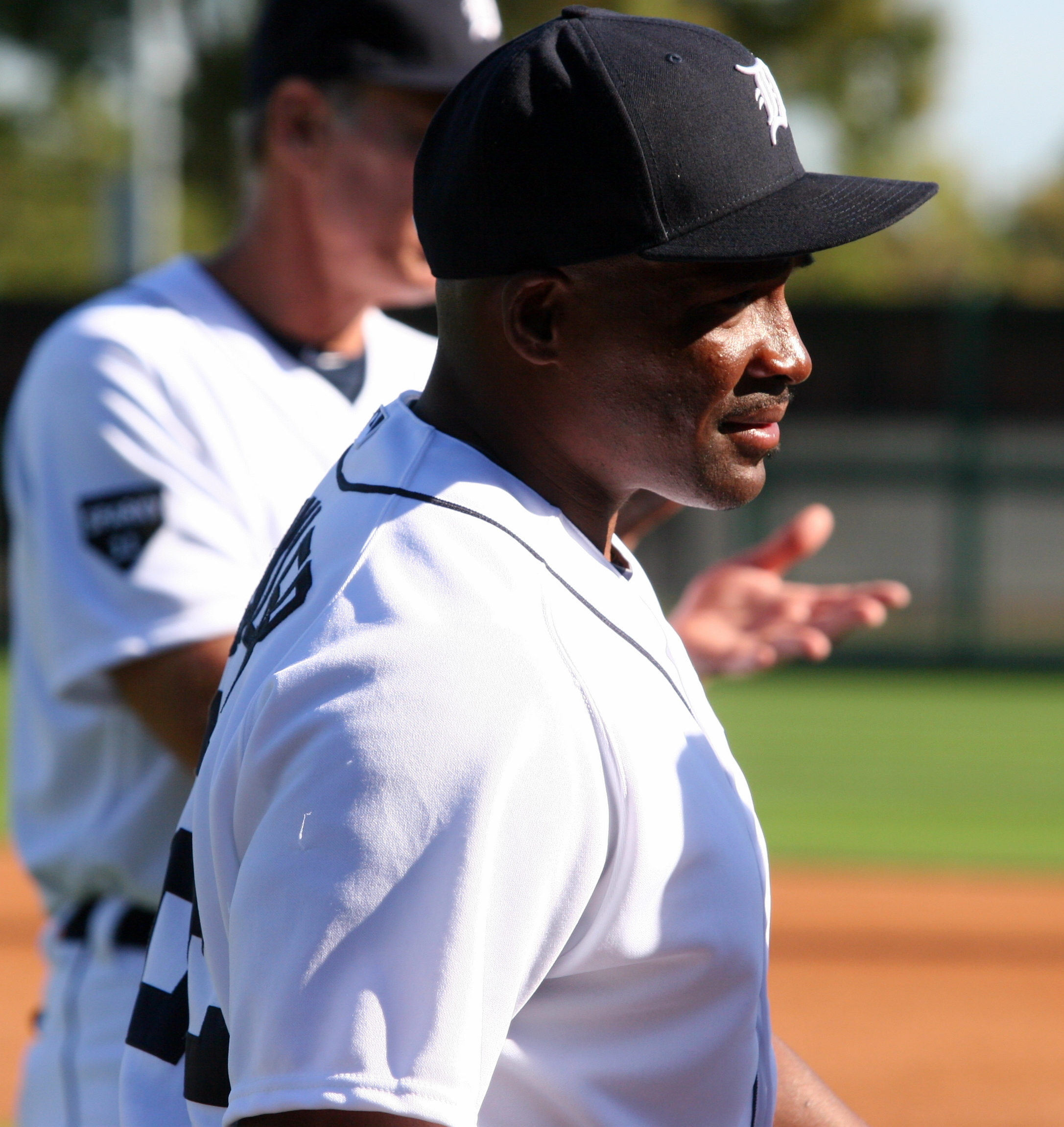
- Cuyler at Detroit Tigers fantasy camp in 2012
- Center fielder
- Born: October 7, 1968 (age 57); Macon, Georgia, U.S.
- Batted: Both Threw: Right

MLB debut
- September 6, 1990, for the Detroit Tigers

Last MLB appearance
- September 27, 1998, for the Texas Rangers

MLB statistics
- Batting average: .237
- Home runs: 10
- Runs batted in: 119
- Stats at Baseball Reference

Teams
- Detroit Tigers (1990–1995); Boston Red Sox (1996); Texas Rangers (1998)

Milton Cuyler, Jr. (born October 7, 1968) is an American former Major League Baseball outfielder drafted by the Detroit Tigers in the second round of the 1986 amateur draft. He finished third behind Juan Guzman and winner Chuck Knoblauch for the 1991 American League Rookie of the Year award.

== Early life ==
Cuyler graduated from Southwest High School in Macon, Georgia. He was drafted by the Detroit Tigers in the second round, 46th overall, of the 1986 Major League Baseball draft. Also a standout football player, Cuyler had signed a letter of intent to play college football at Florida State, where he would've joined Deion Sanders as the top incoming defensive backs. He opted to play baseball full time when the Tigers offered a $75,000 signing bonus, although FSU defensive coordinator Mickey Andrews left open the opportunity to return to football.

Cuyler was considered among the Tigers best prospects for four consecutive years by Baseball America, ranking 5th in 1988, 4th in 1989, 5th in 1990, and 3rd in 1991. 1988 Florida State League

== Professional baseball career ==
Cuyler made his major league debut with the Detroit Tigers on September 6, 1990, at the age of 21 as a defensive replacement in right field for John Shelby. He saw consistent playing time in centerfield and batting ninth to close out the 1990 season, with Lloyd Moseby moving from center to leftfield.

Cuyler was named the Detroit Tigers Rookie of the Year in 1991, and finished 3rd overall in American League Rookie of the Year voting behind winner Chuck Knoblauch and runner-up Juan Guzman.

After failing to live up to his early promise, he was released by the Tigers following the 1995 season. He signed as a free agent with the Boston Red Sox for 1996, but saw very little activity with the Sox (110 at bats in only 50 games for a .200 batting average). He signed with the Montreal Expos following the season, but failed to make the team that spring. He appeared in seven games for the Texas Rangers in September 1998, and spent the 1999 season in their minor league system before calling it a career. In 490 games from 1990–1998, Cuyler tallied 329 hits, 10 home runs and 119 runs batted in with a .237 career average.

Following his playing career, Cuyler served as the hitting coach for the Gulf Coast League Twins until 2013.

In 2011, Cuyler was named to the Macon Sports Hall of Fame.
