= Todd Revenig =

American baseball player (born 1969)

- Pitcher
- Born: June 28, 1969 (age 56); Brainerd, Minnesota, U.S.
- Batted: Right Threw: Right

MLB debut
- August 24, 1992, for the Oakland Athletics

Last MLB appearance
- August 31, 1992, for the Oakland Athletics

MLB statistics
- Win–loss record: 0–0
- Earned run average: 0.00
- Strikeouts: 1

CPBL statistics
- Win–loss record: 25–13
- Earned run average: 3.99
- Strikeouts: 150
- Stats at Baseball Reference

Teams
- Oakland Athletics (1992); Wei Chuan Dragons (1997–1999)

Career highlights and awards
- 3x Taiwan Series champion (1997–1999)

Todd Michael Revenig (born June 28, 1969) is an American former professional baseball pitcher. He played for the Oakland Athletics during the 1992 season appearing in two games. He spent much of his career playing in the Chinese Professional Baseball League and the minor leagues.

== Career ==
Revenig began his professional career in the Oakland Athletics organization in 1990. After a dominant rise through the minor leagues, Revenig was promoted to the majors in 1992, making his major league debut on August 24, 1992, and only appearing in one other MLB game on August 31. Revenig missed the 1993 season due to injury and remained in the Athletics' minor league system through the 1995 season. After 1995, Revenig signed a minor league contract with the Baltimore Orioles organization, and played for the Double-A Bowie Baysox and Triple-A Rochester Red Wings. He became a free agent after the 1996 season and signed with the Wei Chuan Dragons of the Chinese Professional Baseball League. Revenig played with the Dragons from 1997 to 1999, appearing in 64 total games and registering a 3.99 ERA. Revenig also won the Taiwan Series in all three seasons with Wei Chuan. In 2000, Revenig signed with the Arizona Diamondbacks organization, and appeared with three different minor league affiliates. In 2001, he played for the Triple-A Tucson Sidewinders before becoming a free agent after the season. In 2002, Revenig played in 7 games for the Piratas de Campeche of the Mexican League.
