= Henry Mercedes =

Dominican baseball player (born 1969)

- Catcher
- Born: July 23, 1969 (age 56); Santo Domingo, Dominican Republic
- Batted: Right Threw: Right

MLB debut
- April 22, 1992, for the Oakland Athletics

Last MLB appearance
- September 21, 1997, for the Texas Rangers

MLB statistics
- Batting average: .247
- Home runs: 0
- Runs batted in: 17
- Stats at Baseball Reference

Teams
- Oakland Athletics (1992–1993); Kansas City Royals (1995–1996); Texas Rangers (1997)

Henry Felipe Mercedes Pérez (born July 23, 1969) is a Dominican former professional baseball catcher. He played in parts of five seasons in Major League Baseball (MLB), all in the American League.

After making his MLB debut with the Oakland Athletics during the 1992 season, batting 4-for-5 with a triple in nine games played, he again played for the Athletics in 1993, followed by stints with the Kansas City Royals during 1995–1996 and with the Texas Rangers in 1997. Overall, Mercedes played in 79 major-league games, compiling a .247 batting average with 17 runs batted in (RBIs). In Minor League Baseball, his career spanned 1988 to 2000, where he played in 828 games while batting .224 with 44 home runs and 309 RBIs. He also played in the Mexican League during 2002 and 2003, and briefly in the Dominican Winter League in 2006–07.
