= Johnny Guzmán =

Dominican baseball player (born 1971)

- Pitcher
- Born: January 21, 1971 (age 55); Hatillo Palma, Dominican Republic
- Batted: Right Threw: Left

MLB debut
- June 8, 1991, for the Oakland Athletics

Last MLB appearance
- June 28, 1992, for the Oakland Athletics

MLB statistics
- Win–loss record: 1–0
- Earned run average: 10.13
- Strikeouts: 3

CPBL statistics
- Win–loss record: 0–1
- Earned run average: 10.13
- Strikeouts: 6
- Stats at Baseball Reference

Teams
- Oakland Athletics (1991–1992); Wei Chuan Dragons (1995)

Dionini Ramon "Johnny" Guzmán Estrella (born January 21, 1971) is a Dominican former Major League Baseball (MLB) pitcher. He played for the Oakland Athletics during the 1991 and 1992 seasons. He appeared in seven games, all as a relief pitcher.
