= John Briscoe (baseball) =

American baseball player (born 1967)

- Pitcher
- Born: September 22, 1967 (age 57); La Grange, Illinois, U.S.
- Batted: Right Threw: Right

MLB debut
- April 18, 1991, for the Oakland Athletics

Last MLB appearance
- May 21, 1996, for the Oakland Athletics

MLB statistics
- Win–loss record: 5–5
- Earned run average: 5.67
- Strikeouts: 115
- Stats at Baseball Reference

Teams
- Oakland Athletics (1991–1996)

John Eric Briscoe (born September 22, 1967) is an American former professional baseball pitcher. Briscoe played for the Oakland Athletics of Major League Baseball (MLB) from 1991 to 1996.

== Career ==
Briscoe attended Lloyd V. Berkner High School and Texas Christian University. In 1987, he played collegiate summer baseball with the Falmouth Commodores of the Cape Cod Baseball League.

Briscoe pitched for the Somerset Patriots of the independent Atlantic League of Professional Baseball from 1998 through 2002. In 2001, he compiled a 5–1 win-loss record with 22 saves and an earned-run average of 2.70 as the Patriots won the league championship.
