= Travis Fryman =

American baseball player (born 1969)

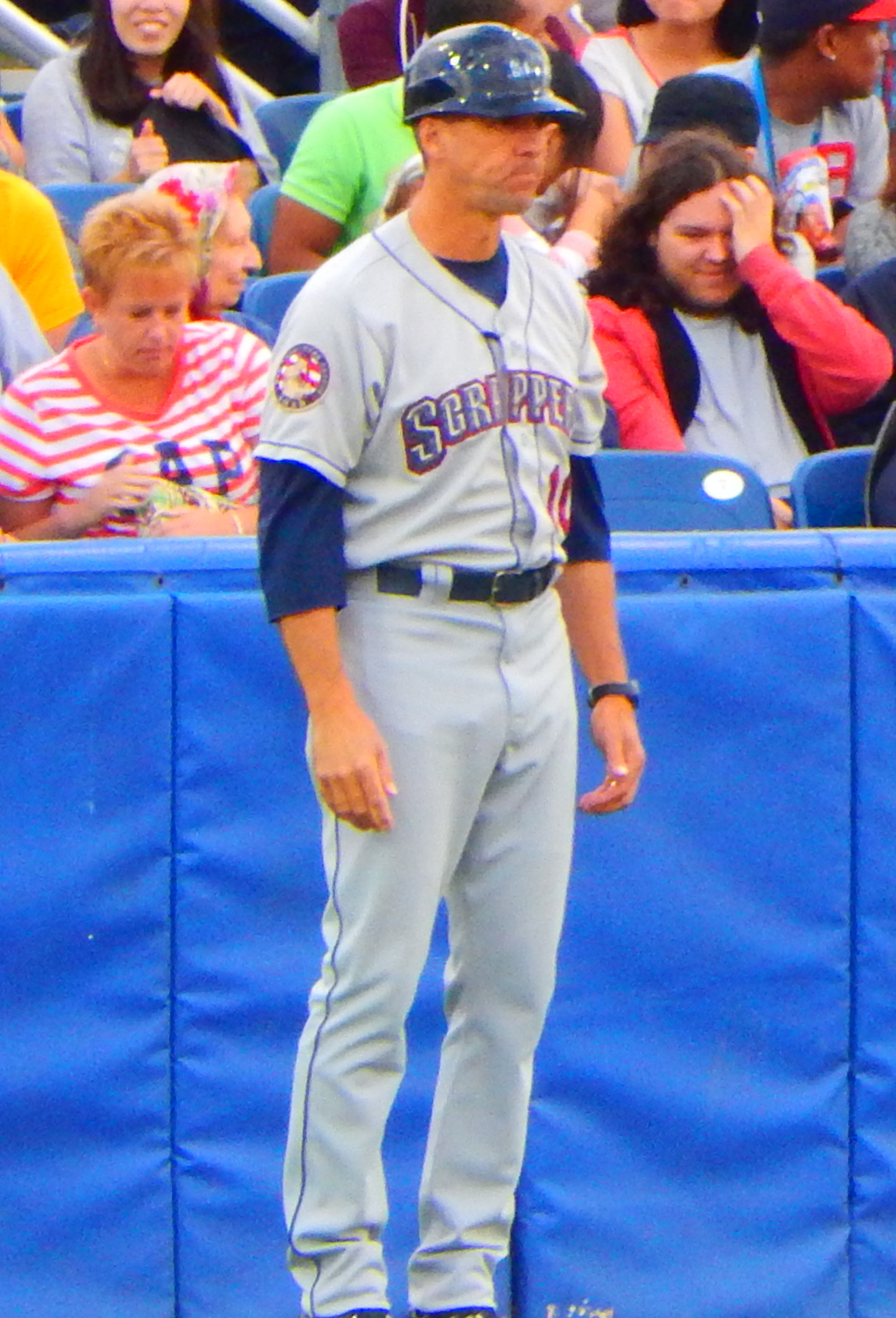
- Fryman with the Mahoning Valley Scrappers in 2015
- Third baseman
- Born: March 25, 1969 (age 56); Lexington, Kentucky, U.S.
- Batted: Right Threw: Right

MLB debut
- July 7, 1990, for the Detroit Tigers

Last MLB appearance
- September 29, 2002, for the Cleveland Indians

MLB statistics
- Batting average: .274
- Home runs: 223
- Runs batted in: 1,022
- Stats at Baseball Reference

Teams
- Detroit Tigers (1990–1997); Cleveland Indians (1998–2002)

Career highlights and awards
- 5× All-Star (1992–1994, 1996, 2000); Gold Glove Award (2000); Silver Slugger Award (1992)

David Travis Fryman (born March 25, 1969) is an American former professional baseball third baseman who played in Major League Baseball for the Detroit Tigers and Cleveland Indians from 1990 to 2002. He is currently a hitting instructor for the Cleveland Guardians farm system, and he also managed the Mahoning Valley Scrappers from 2008 to 2010 as well as in 2015.

== Early life ==
Fryman was born in Lexington, Kentucky, to Bill Fryman, a basketball coach and tire store manager. The family moved to Pensacola, Florida, when Fryman was three years old, and variously lived in Pensacola and Orlando. Fryman attended a Baptist church every Sunday as a child. He led Gonzalez J. M. Tate High School to a Florida high-school championship over Lake Mary High School at Rollins College in 1986.

== Detroit Tigers ==
The Detroit Tigers drafted Fryman in the first round of the 1987 Major League Baseball draft out of Tate High School in Pensacola. He debuted with the Tigers at Tiger Stadium on July 7, 1990, in a 4–0 loss to the Kansas City Royals, playing shortstop, but ended up seeing more time at third over the course of his first season in the majors.

Fryman split time between short and third in 1991 before an injury to Alan Trammell allowed him to inherit the starting shortstop job in 1992. He hit 20 home runs and drove in 96 runs to earn his first All-Star selection, and win the American League Silver Slugger Award at his position.

Fryman started 1993 at shortstop, but earned the third base job by the end of the season. He remained at third for Detroit until joining the expansion Arizona Diamondbacks via a trade following the 1997 season for Matt Drews. Two weeks after joining the Diamondbacks, Fryman was traded again, along with pitcher Tom Martin, to the Indians for third baseman Matt Williams.

== Cleveland Indians ==
Fryman batted .287 with 28 home runs and 96 RBIs his first season in Cleveland to help lead his team to the American League Central division crown. Fryman batted only .167 with no RBIs and committed one error in the field in his first post-season as the Indians were ousted in the 1998 American League Championship Series by the New York Yankees.

Injuries hampered Fryman in 1999. He rebounded to have his best season in 2000. He established career highs in batting average (.321), slugging percentage (.516), on-base percentage (.392), hits (184), doubles, and RBIs (106). Additionally, he made only eight errors in the field and had a 60-game errorless streak on his way to winning a Gold Glove Award. He was also the starting third baseman for the American League at the All-Star Game. His teammates rewarded his efforts with the Gordon Cobbledick Golden Tomahawk Award, and the Cleveland Baseball Writers' Association named him their Man of the Year.

Injuries again limited Fryman in 2001, as he did not make his first appearance until June 2. In 2002, he had the lowest range factor of all major league third basemen (2.31), as well as the lowest zone rating (.680).

In a 13-season career, Fryman posted a .274 batting average with 223 home runs and 1,022 RBIs in 1,698 games. Fryman retired after the 2002 season.

== Coaching career ==
Fryman became the manager of the Mahoning Valley Scrappers, the short-season A affiliate of the Indians in the New York–Penn League, in 2008. It was his managerial debut after having worked as an infield instructor with the Indians during spring training that year.

Fryman has also served as a hitting instructor for the Guardians farm system, traveling to all of the Guardians AAA, AA, and A minor league teams, including the Akron Aeros in 2013.

== Personal life ==
Fryman has three children, Mason, Branden, and Cole. He married his wife, Kathleen, in the early 1990s. The couple became devout Christians after Kathleen met Frank Tanana's wife, Cathy.

== See also ==
- List of Major League Baseball career home run leaders
- List of Major League Baseball career runs batted in leaders
- List of Major League Baseball players to hit for the cycle

Awards and achievements
Preceded by Jay Buhner	Hitting for the cycle July 28, 1993	Succeeded by Scott Cooper
Preceded by Manny Ramirez	Gordon Cobbledick; Golden Tomahawk Award; 2000	Succeeded by Roberto Alomar
