= Lloyd Moseby =

American baseball player (born 1959)

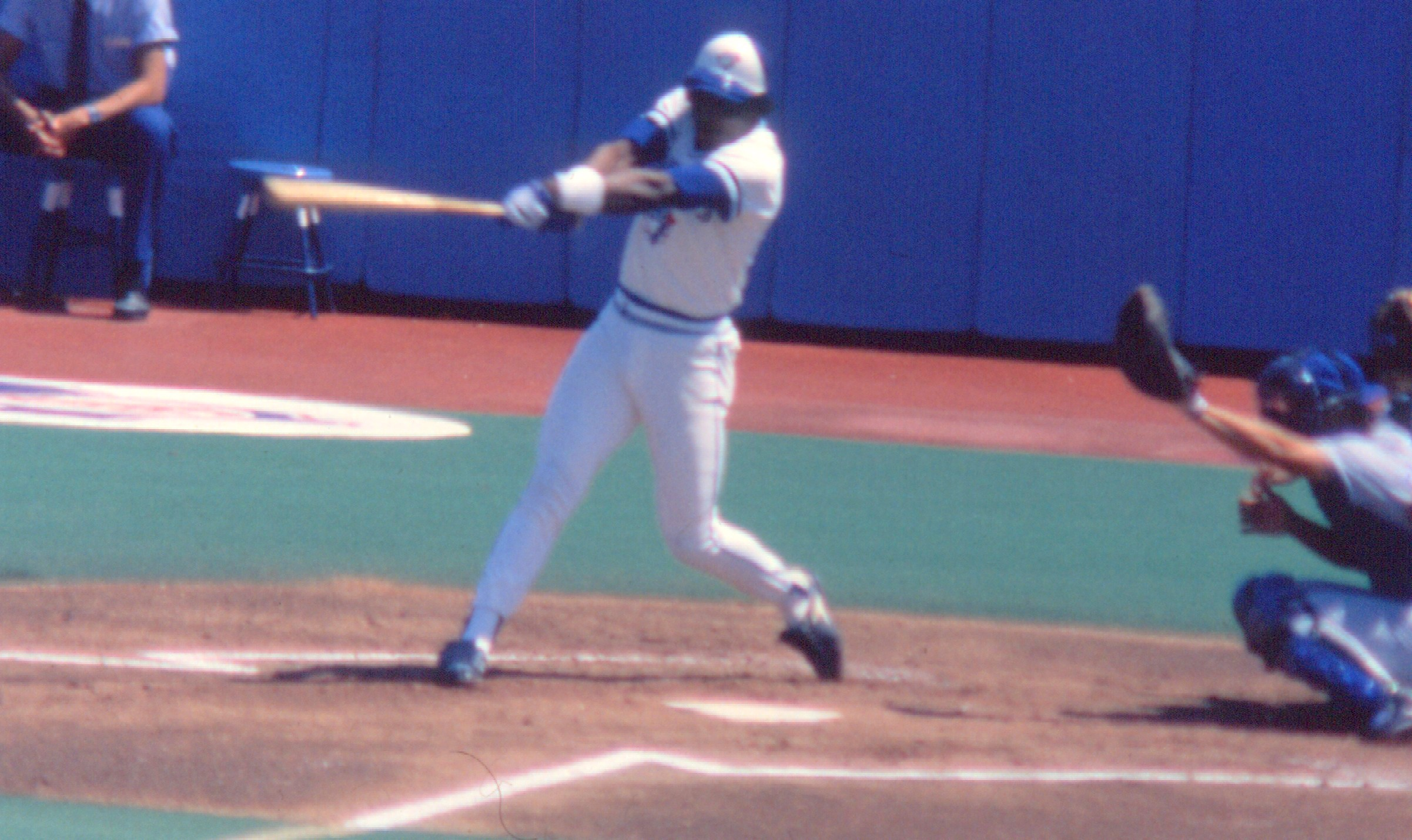
- Moseby at bat during a game in September 1985
- Center fielder
- Born: November 5, 1959 (age 66); Portland, Arkansas, U.S.
- Batted: Left Threw: Right

Professional debut
- MLB: May 24, 1980, for the Toronto Blue Jays
- NPB: April 21, 1992, for the Yomiuri Giants

Last appearance
- MLB: October 6, 1991, for the Detroit Tigers
- NPB: August 28, 1993, for the Yomiuri Giants

MLB statistics
- Batting average: .257
- Home runs: 169
- Runs batted in: 737

NPB statistics
- Batting average: .289
- Home runs: 29
- Runs batted in: 84
- Stats at Baseball Reference

Teams
- Toronto Blue Jays (1980–1989); Detroit Tigers (1990–1991); Yomiuri Giants (1992–1993)

Career highlights and awards
- All-Star (1986); Silver Slugger Award (1983)

Member of the Canadian

Baseball Hall of Fame
- Induction: 2018

Lloyd Anthony Moseby (born November 5, 1959) is an American former Major League Baseball player. A center fielder, and good all-around athlete, Moseby's nickname, "Shaker", was said to stem from his ability to get away from or "shake" players who attempted to defend him on the basketball court.

== Career ==
Born in Portland, Arkansas, Moseby graduated from Oakland High School in Oakland, California. Moseby's primary sport in high school was basketball and he did not take baseball seriously until his sophomore year. Moseby had committed to play college basketball for St. Mary's, one of 75 schools to offer him a basketball scholarship, if he had not decided to sign with the Blue Jays.

Drafted 2nd overall by the Toronto Blue Jays in the 1978 amateur draft, Moseby made his major league debut on May 24, 1980. Despite some growing pains early in his career, Moseby developed into a well-polished batter, fielder, and base-runner, driving in nearly 100 runs in three seasons (1984, 1986, and 1987) and regularly stealing 30-plus bases. Moseby finished in the top 25 for the American League Most Valuable Player Award twice—1983 and 1984.

In the mid-1980s, he was part of the powerful "Killer B's" outfield trio for the Jays, playing center field between George Bell and Jesse Barfield. On April 19, 1983, he hit a walk-off two-run home run against Dan Spillner to give the Blue Jays a 9-7 victory over the Cleveland Indians. On August 16, 1987, Moseby took part in an unusual baserunning play. While on first base, he made an attempt to steal second base that saw the catcher throw the ball into centerfield. Moseby, now at second seeing the ball in the hands of the centerfielder, essentially made a run back to "steal" first base. Strangely enough, the center fielder, in trying to throw the ball back to the first baseman in an attempt to perhaps pick off Moseby, threw the ball wide and hard that resulted in Moseby racing to second base on the error. After the 1989 season, Moseby signed with the Detroit Tigers. Moseby saw limited action with the Tigers for two seasons and then traveled to Japan, where he played with the Yomiuri Giants in 1992 and 1993.

Over his career, Moseby had 869 runs, 169 home runs, 737 runs batted in, and 280 stolen bases with a career batting average of .257. He led the American League in triples in 1984 and was an All-Star in 1986. As of 2018, Moseby ranks in the top 10 for Toronto Blue Jays career leaders in WAR, games played, at-bats, runs, hits, doubles, triples, home runs, RBI, walks, stolen bases (franchise leader), and extra-base hits.

Moseby served as the Blue Jays' first base coach in 1998 and 1999.

In 2018, Moseby was inducted into the Canadian Baseball Hall of Fame. As of June 2018, Moseby was living on Queens Quay in Toronto.

== See also ==
- List of Major League Baseball annual triples leaders
