= Scott Livingstone =

American baseball player (born 1965)

- Third baseman
- Born: July 15, 1965 (age 60); Dallas, Texas, U.S.
- Batted: Left Threw: Right

MLB debut
- July 19, 1991, for the Detroit Tigers

Last MLB appearance
- September 26, 1998, for the Montreal Expos

MLB statistics
- Batting average: .281
- Home runs: 17
- Runs batted in: 177
- Stats at Baseball Reference

Teams
- Detroit Tigers (1991–1994); San Diego Padres (1994–1997); St. Louis Cardinals (1997); Montreal Expos (1998)
Medals
Men's baseball
Representing United States
Pan American Games
Silver medal – second place	1987 Indianapolis	Team

Scott Louis Livingstone (born July 15, 1965) is an American former professional baseball player. He played all or parts of eight seasons in Major League Baseball, from 1991 to 1998, for the Detroit Tigers, San Diego Padres, St. Louis Cardinals and Montreal Expos.

For his career, Livingstone hit .281 with 17 home runs and 177 runs batted in. In 1992, he hit .282 in 117 games and 354 at bats with a career-high 100 hits. His career high average was 1995 in his first full season with the Padres, when he hit .337 in 99 games. In 1992, Livingstone was honored as the Tigers Rookie of the Year.

Livingstone currently lives in Southlake, Texas, where he also owns his own baseball academy for kids.

Awards
Preceded by Leo Gómez	Topps Rookie All-Star Third Baseman; 1992	Succeeded by Mike Lansing
