= Rob Deer =

American baseball player (born 1960)

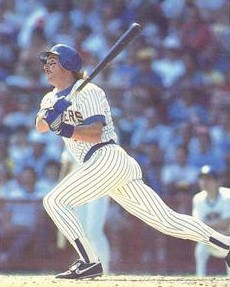
- Right fielder
- Born: September 29, 1960 (age 65); Orange, California, U.S.
- Batted: Right Threw: Right

MLB debut
- September 4, 1984, for the San Francisco Giants

Last MLB appearance
- August 5, 1996, for the San Diego Padres

MLB statistics
- Batting average: .220
- Home runs: 230
- Runs batted in: 600

NPB statistics
- Batting average: .151
- Home runs: 8
- Runs batted in: 21
- Stats at Baseball Reference

Teams
- San Francisco Giants (1984–1985); Milwaukee Brewers (1986–1990); Detroit Tigers (1991–1993); Boston Red Sox (1993); Hanshin Tigers (1994); San Diego Padres (1996)

Career highlights and awards
- Milwaukee Brewers Wall of Honor

Robert George Deer (born September 29, 1960) is an American former professional baseball outfielder.

== Early life ==
Deer attended Canyon High School in Anaheim and Fresno City College. During his tenure with the Milwaukee Brewers, he worked for his father's construction firm.

== Baseball career ==
=== San Francisco Giants (1984–1985) ===
Deer was drafted by the San Francisco Giants in the 4th round of the 1978 amateur draft. Deer made his debut on September 4, 1984, at Candlestick Park against the Cincinnati Reds. As a pinch hitter facing Ted Power in the ninth inning, he flied out to end the game. He played 13 games that year, batting .167 while having three home runs and RBIs, with seven walks and 10 strikeouts. The following year, he played in 78 games, batting .185 while having eight home runs, 20 RBIs, 71 strikeouts, and 23 walks. On December 18, he was traded to the Milwaukee Brewers for two minor league prospects (Dean Freeland and Eric Plinkington).

=== Milwaukee Brewers (1986–1990) ===
With Milwaukee, he had increased playing time. In 1986, he played in 134 games, hitting .232 while posting career highs with 33 home runs and 86 RBIs. He had 72 walks, but struck out 179 times. The following year, he played in 134 games while batting .238 with 28 home runs and 80 RBIs. He had 12 stolen bases and 86 walks, both career highs. The walks helped him post a respectable .360 on-base percentage in 1987, but he also led the majors with 186 strikeouts. On Easter Sunday, he hit a game-tying home run, helping the Milwaukee Brewers earn their 12th straight win to start the season. The home run was featured on the cover of Sports Illustrated.

=== Detroit Tigers (1991–1993) ===
After the 1990 season, Deer signed as a free agent with the Detroit Tigers. In 1991, he posted the then-record for lowest qualified batting average in Major League history, going 80-for-448, a .179 average. (Dan Uggla tied Deer's .179 record in 2013, posting an identical 80-for-448 mark, and Chris Davis broke the record by hitting .168 in 2018.) That season, Deer had 41 extra-base hits and only 39 singles. In 1992, he hit 32 home runs in only 110 games while posting the second-highest batting average of his career (.247).

=== Boston, Hanshin Tigers, San Diego (1993–1996) ===
In July 1993, the Tigers traded Deer to the Boston Red Sox. He then spent a year playing for the Hanshin Tigers of Nippon Professional Baseball. After a year out of baseball, he returned to the majors in 1996, playing 25 games for the San Diego Padres.

Deer's final major league appearance was in the bottom of the eighth inning of a Padres-Cardinals game on August 5, 1996, replacing Greg Vaughn in left field. He caught a fly ball to end the inning for the Padres, who lost 8–2.

=== Coaching ===
After his retirement, Deer worked as a roving hitting instructor in the San Diego Padres minor league system, and served as the assistant hitting coach for the Chicago Cubs from 2012 to 2013.

== Legacy ==
Deer has gained notoriety in sabermetrics circles due to his propensity for the Three True Outcomes (defined as a strikeout, home run, or base on balls). The concept, originating in a Baseball Prospectus article in 2000, draws heavily upon Deer's career numbers—49.7% of his career plate appearances ended in one of the Three True Outcomes. Because of Deer's ability to hit for power (eight straight seasons of 21 or more homers) and draw walks, he remained an above-average hitter despite his low batting average and high strikeout totals.

Deer held the American League record for strikeouts in a season (186 strikeouts in 1987) until being passed by Jack Cust in 2008. He struck out at least 140 times in a season on seven occasions, and averaged a strikeout every 2.75 at-bats over his career. A 2022 article comparing him to Yankees slugger Joey Gallo referred to Deer as the oft-mentioned "king of all-or-nothing sluggers."

In December 2013, Deer was announced as part of the inaugural class of the Milwaukee Brewers Wall of Honor.

== See also ==
- List of Major League Baseball career home run leaders
