= John Kiely (baseball) =

American baseball player (born 1964)

- Pitcher
- Born: October 4, 1964 (age 61); Boston, Massachusetts, U.S.
- Batted: Right Threw: Right

MLB debut
- July 26, 1991, for the Detroit Tigers

Last MLB appearance
- May 2, 1993, for the Detroit Tigers

MLB statistics
- Win–loss record: 4–5
- Earned run average: 4.17
- Strikeouts: 24
- Stats at Baseball Reference

Teams
- Detroit Tigers (1991–1993)

John Francis Kiely (born October 4, 1964) is an American former Major League Baseball pitcher who played for the Detroit Tigers from 1991 to 1993.

== Biography ==
A native of Boston, Massachusetts, Kiely attended Brockton High School and Bridgewater State College. In 1987, he played collegiate summer baseball with the Wareham Gatemen of the Cape Cod Baseball League.

Kiely signed with the Detroit Tigers as an amateur free agent in 1987 and made his major league debut for Detroit in 1991. He enjoyed his most productive season in 1992 when he posted a 4–2 record with a 2.13 ERA over 39 appearances for the Tigers.
