= Shawn Hare =

American baseball player (born 1967)

- Outfielder / First baseman
- Born: March 26, 1967 (age 59); St. Louis, Missouri, U.S.
- Batted: Left Threw: Left

Professional debut
- MLB: September 6, 1991, for the Detroit Tigers
- KBO: 1998, for the Haitai Tigers

Last appearance
- MLB: June 17, 1995, for the Texas Rangers
- KBO: 1998, for the Haitai Tigers

MLB statistics
- Batting average: .174
- Home runs: 0
- Runs batted in: 9

KBO statistics
- Batting average: .206
- Home runs: 0
- Runs batted in: 3
- Stats at Baseball Reference

Teams
- Detroit Tigers (1991–1992); New York Mets (1994); Texas Rangers (1995); Haitai Tigers (1998)

Shawn Robert Hare (born March 26, 1967) is an American former professional baseball outfielder. Hare played four seasons in Major League Baseball (MLB), appearing in 64 games from 1991 to 1995 with the Detroit Tigers, New York Mets, and Texas Rangers. He also played in the KBO League for the Haitai Tigers.

== Professional baseball career ==
Hare was signed as an undrafted free agent by the Tigers on August 28, 1988, and played in the minor leagues until making his major league debut on September 26, 1991. After playing in 24 games for the Tigers in 1991 and 1992, Hare was placed on waivers in 1994 and claimed by the Mets. With the Mets in 1994, Hare appeared in 22 games and collected 9 hits, both career highs. The following season, Hare signed with the Texas Rangers and played in 18 games with the team, before his brief MLB career came to an end. After the 1995 season, Hare played with the minor league affiliates of the St. Louis Cardinals, New York Yankees and Tigers until 1997.

=== 1998 in the KBO ===
In 1998, Hare signed with the Korea Professional Baseball Haitai Tigers. He finished the season with a .206 batting average, 14 hits, 4 base on balls, 25 strikeouts, no home runs, 3 RBIs, and 3 runs scored in 29 games and 68 at bats. Hare became famous for some comments he made before the season, one thing is "which do you want: .300 or 30 home runs?", another thing is when he asked whether the ball should be hit over the fence or out of the whole stadium to be a home run, after which he failed to hit a home run that year. The comment, meant as a joke to endear him to the Korean fans, became his most remembered moment during his time there.

=== After baseball ===
In 2000, Hare transitioned into the financial services industry. He later served as the Vice President of Wealth Management at Morgan Stanley Smith Barney in Sherman Oaks, California.
