= Skeeter Barnes =

American baseball player (born 1957)

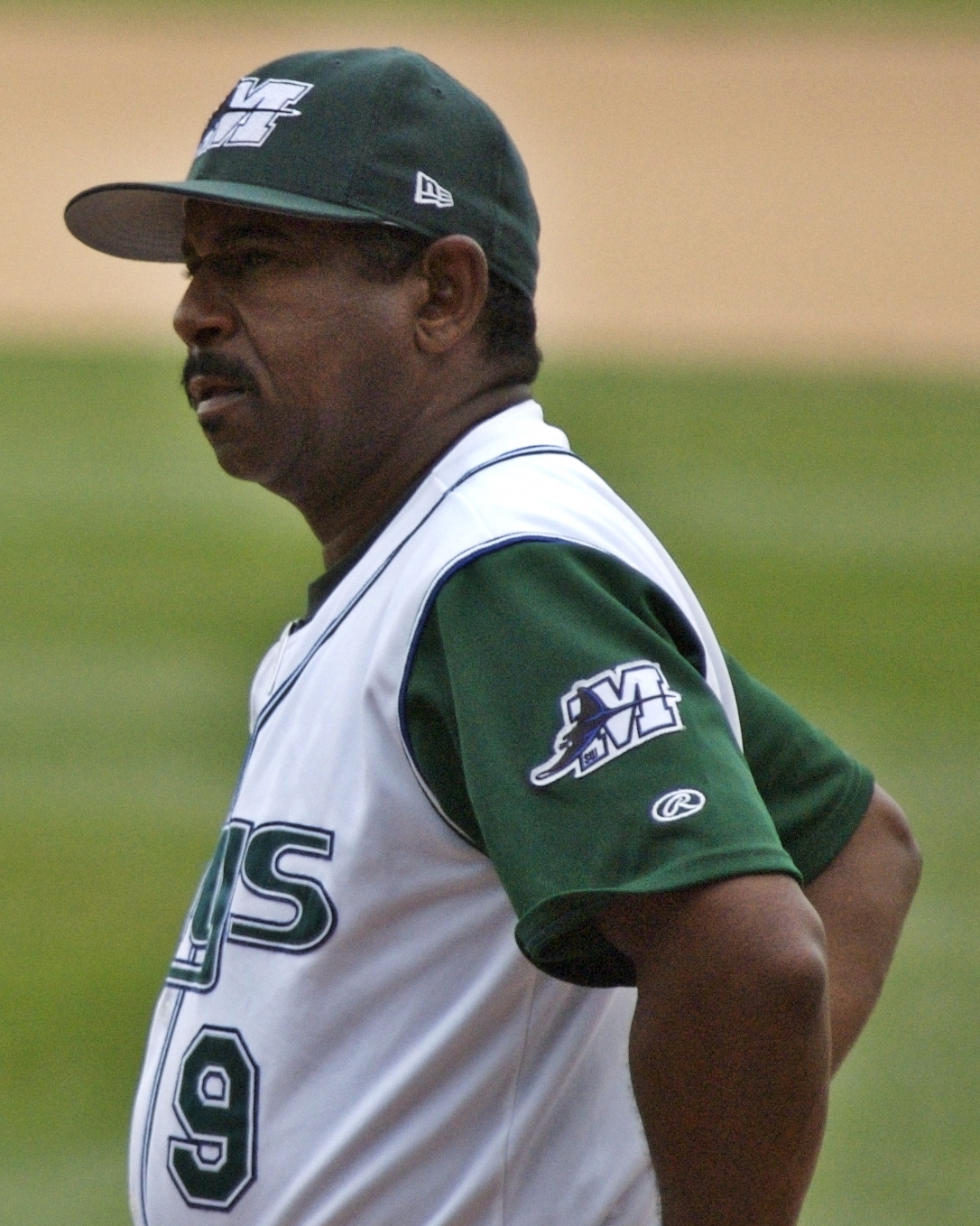
- Barnes with the Southwest Michigan Devil Rays in 2006
- Utility player
- Born: March 7, 1957 (age 68); Cincinnati, Ohio, U.S.
- Batted: Right Threw: Right

MLB debut
- September 6, 1983, for the Cincinnati Reds

Last MLB appearance
- June 20, 1994, for the Detroit Tigers

MLB statistics
- Batting average: .259
- Home runs: 14
- Runs batted ins: 83
- Stats at Baseball Reference

Teams
- Cincinnati Reds (1983–1984); Montreal Expos (1985); St. Louis Cardinals (1987); Cincinnati Reds (1989); Detroit Tigers (1991–1994)

William Henry "Skeeter" Barnes (born March 7, 1957) is an American former Major League Baseball utility player. He played in MLB for the Cincinnati Reds (1983–1984 and 1989), Montreal Expos (1985), St. Louis Cardinals (1987) and Detroit Tigers (1991–1994). Following his playing career, Barnes spent nearly two decades as a manager and coach in Minor League Baseball.

== Playing career ==
Barnes was born in Cincinnati, Ohio. After playing college baseball at his hometown University of Cincinnati, Barnes was selected by the Reds in the 16th round of the 1978 Major League Baseball draft. Barnes worked his way through the minors, earning promotion to the Reds in 1983 after hitting .337 for the Reds' Indianapolis farm club. He made his Major League debut on September 6, 1983, at Candlestick Park and was twice hit by pitch. As of 2020, he is the only player to be hit by more than one pitch in his debut.

Although Barnes continued to have great success at the Triple-A level for many years, he was unable to find a home in the majors. Between 1984 and 1990, he played in just 60 big-league games, including four for the 1987 National League champion St. Louis Cardinals. In four of those years, he hit .300 or better in the minors.

Barnes finally achieved stable big-league status at the age of 34, an age at which many players have been long retired. After hammering International League pitching at a .330 clip through the first two months of the 1991 season, Barnes was called up by the Tigers. A capable fielder at several positions and a good contact hitter, he turned out to be a good fit for the Tigers, which had defensive problems and a lineup that struck out a lot. Barnes spent most of the next three seasons with the Tigers. Detroit fans appreciated his blue-collar work ethic; he was sometimes called "Crash Davis" after the fictional character in the film Bull Durham, who had spent most of his career in the minor leagues.

During all or part of nine seasons in the majors, Barnes played in 353 games with 614 at-bats, 95 runs, 159 hits, 30 doubles, four triples, 14 home runs, 83 RBIs, 20 stolen bases, 41 walks, .259 batting average, .306 on-base percentage, .389 slugging percentage, 239 total bases, eight sacrifice hits, eight sacrifice flies, and three intentional walks.

In the minor leagues, Barnes batted .296 for his career and had 1,773 career hits. At the time, he ranked as one of the all-time leading hitters in the minor leagues. Barnes's uniform number 00 was retired by the Nashville Sounds in 1991.

== Coaching career ==
Barnes retired as a player following the 1994 season, and stayed active in the game as a minor-league coach and manager. He held stints as a manager with the Lakeland Tigers in 2000 and with the Southwest Michigan Devil Rays in 2006. Barnes held other coaching positions in the International League (1995–96, 1999), Midwest League (1997–98, 2005), and Southern League (2003–04). From 2007 until his retirement after the 2023 season, Barnes served as a minor-league outfield and base-running coordinator in the Tampa Bay Rays organization.
