= Dann Howitt =

American baseball player (born 1964)

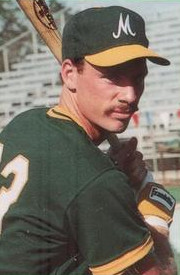
- Howitt with the Modesto A's in 1988
- Outfielder
- Born: February 13, 1964 (age 62); Battle Creek, Michigan, U.S.
- Batted: Left Threw: Right

MLB debut
- September 15, 1989, for the Oakland Athletics

Last MLB appearance
- July 7, 1994, for the Chicago White Sox

MLB statistics
- Batting average: .194
- Home runs: 5
- Runs batted in: 22
- Stats at Baseball Reference

Teams
- Oakland Athletics (1989–1992); Seattle Mariners (1992–1993); Chicago White Sox (1994)

Dann Paul John Howitt (born February 13, 1964) is an American former professional baseball outfielder who played in six Major League Baseball (MLB) seasons.

Howott played high school baseball at Hastings High School in Hastings, Michigan, then played college baseball for the Michigan State Spartans and Cal State Fullerton Titans, graduating in 1986. The Oakland Athletics drafted him in the 18th round of the 1986 MLB draft. Howitt played his first professional season with their Class A Short Season Medford A's in 1986, where he was named a Northwest League All-Star. He spent three seasons with Modesto, leading the team in home runs and runs batted in in 1988. He led the Southern League in total bases in 1989.

Howitt made his MLB debut with Oakland in September 1989. He got his first MLB hit on September 12, 1990. Howitt took steroids for several weeks in 1991, but the performance-enhancing substances affected his personality. Teammate Jose Canseco, who gave him the steroids, told him to stop using them. Howitt played in 60 games for Oakland over parts of four seasons but was released in July 1992 after an 0-for-31 batting slump. He soon signed with the Seattle Mariners. His hitless streak reached 43 at bats and 50 plate appearances.

Howitt got the final hit off Nolan Ryan when he hit a grand slam on September 22, 1993. It was the last game of Ryan's career, and Howitt was the second-to-last batter Ryan ever faced. Ryan injured his arm facing the next batter and left the game before completing the at-bat.

Seattle released Howitt after the 1993 season, and he signed with the Chicago White Sox. He played 10 games for Chicago in 1994, batting .357 in his last MLB season, also spending time in the minors.

Howitt played his final season in the minors with the Colorado Rockies' Triple-A Colorado Springs Sky Sox in 1997. He suffered a career-ending arm injury after volunteering to pitch during a blowout loss.

== Personal life ==
Howitt's older brother played baseball at Michigan State and in the minors in the Kansas City Royals system. Howitt has been married twice and has two children with his first wife.

Howitt became a contributing baseball writer for the sports section of The Grand Rapids Press. He also worked for a technology company in Louisville, Kentucky.
