= Kevin Campbell (baseball) =

American baseball player (born 1964)

- Pitcher
- Born: December 6, 1964 (age 61); Marianna, Arkansas, U.S.
- Batted: Right Threw: Right

MLB debut
- July 19, 1991, for the Oakland Athletics

Last MLB appearance
- May 13, 1995, for the Minnesota Twins

MLB statistics
- Win–loss record: 4–3
- Strikeouts: 83
- Earned run average: 4.55
- Stats at Baseball Reference

Teams
- Oakland Athletics (1991–1993); Minnesota Twins (1994–1995)

Kevin Wade Campbell (born December 6, 1964) is an American former professional baseball player. He played as a right-handed pitcher in Major League Baseball from 1991 to 1995 for the Oakland Athletics and the Minnesota Twins.

Campbell attended the University of Arkansas, and in 1984 he played collegiate summer baseball with the Cotuit Kettleers of the Cape Cod Baseball League. He earned a win in the 1986 College World Series. That June, he was drafted by the Los Angeles Dodgers in the 5th round of the 1986 amateur draft. After spending five seasons in their organization, the Dodgers traded him to the Athletics prior to the 1991 season.
