= Dave Haas =

American baseball player (born 1965)

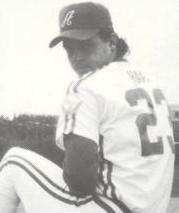
- Pitcher
- Born: October 19, 1965 (age 60); Independence, Missouri, U.S.
- Batted: Right Threw: Right

MLB debut
- September 8, 1991, for the Detroit Tigers

Last MLB appearance
- June 13, 1993, for the Detroit Tigers

MLB statistics
- Win–loss record: 7–5
- Earned run average: 4.84
- Strikeouts: 52
- Stats at Baseball Reference

Teams
- Detroit Tigers (1991–1993)

Robert David Haas (born October 19, 1965) is an American former Major League Baseball pitcher. He pitched parts of three seasons in the majors, from 1991 until 1993, for the Detroit Tigers. On April 14, 1991, Haas pitched a no-hitter while playing for Lakeland in the minors.

Haas attended Wichita State University, and in 1986 he played collegiate summer baseball with the Harwich Mariners of the Cape Cod Baseball League. He was selected by the Tigers in the 15th round of the 1988 MLB draft.

== Sources ==
- Career statistics from Baseball Reference · Baseball Reference (Minors) · Retrosheet · Baseball Almanac
