= Robert Higgins =

Robert Higgins may refer to:

- Robert J. Higgins (born 1934), judge and politician in New Brunswick
- Robert P. Higgins (1932–2022), systematic invertebrate zoologist and ecologist
- Iain Higgins (Robert Higgins, born 1976), rugby league footballer
- Robert Higgins (baseball), American baseball player
- Robert Higgins (weightlifter) (1925–1998), American weightlifter
- Robert Samuel Decosta Higgins, American surgeon

== See also ==
- Bob Higgins (disambiguation)
