= Bob Higgins =

Bob Higgins may refer to:

- Bob Higgins (American football) (1894–1969), American football player and coach
- Bob Higgins (baseball) (1886–1941), professional baseball player
- Bob Higgins (footballer) (born 1958), retired English footballer
- Bob Higgins (trumpeter) (1925–2023), American jazz musician and songwriter
- Bob Higgins, former football coach with Southampton F.C., implicated in the 2016 United Kingdom football sexual abuse scandal

== See also ==
- Robert Higgins (disambiguation)
