= Syracuse Baseball Wall of Fame =

Coordinates: 43°4′42.25″N 76°9′55.9″W

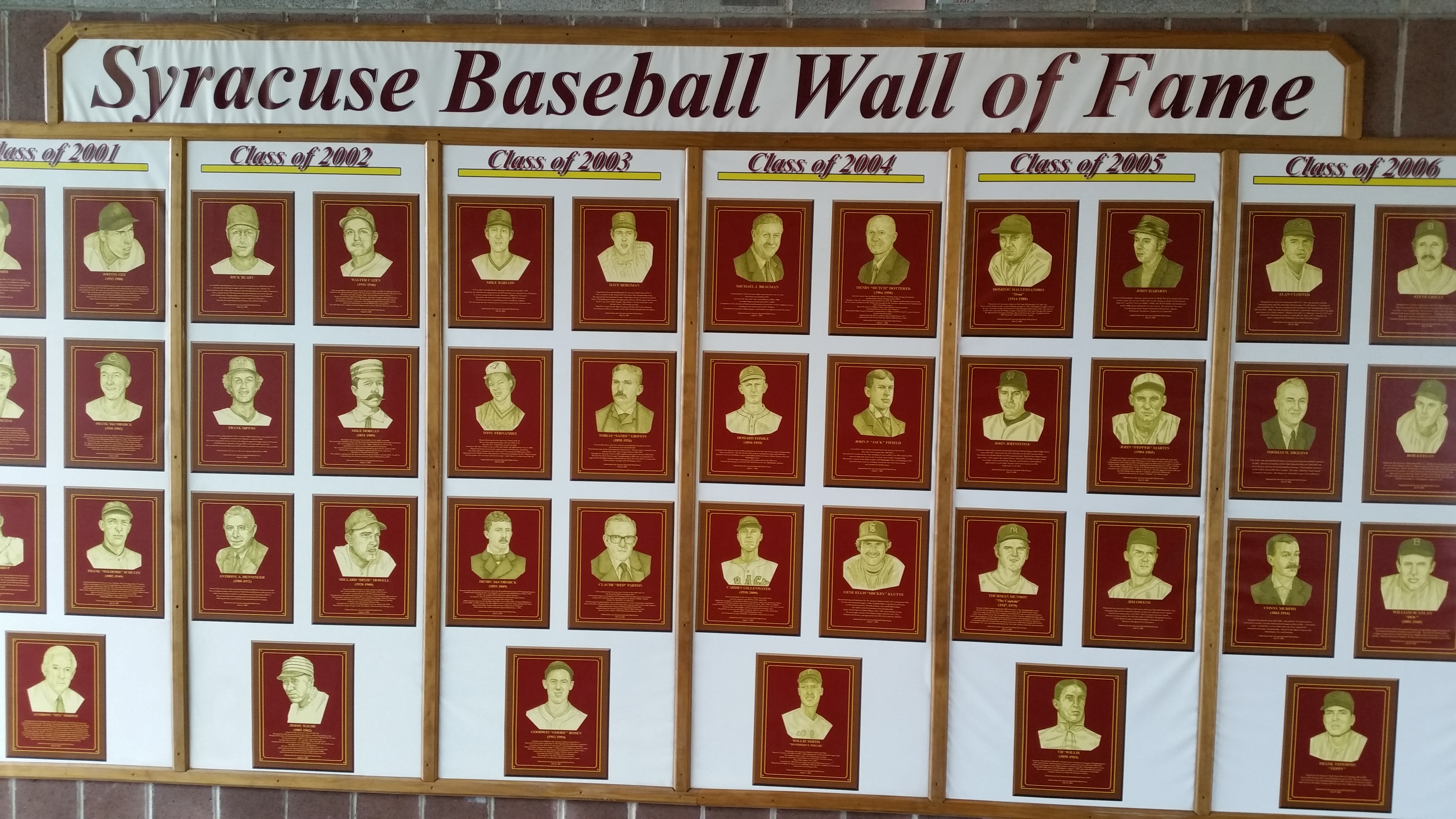
Syracuse Baseball Wall of Fame, NBT Bank Stadium, Syracuse, New York, 2016

The Syracuse Baseball Wall of Fame was established by the Syracuse SkyChiefs in 1998 in conjunction with the 140th anniversary of the first organized baseball team in Syracuse, New York. It is located at NBT Bank Stadium, home of the Syracuse Mets Triple-A baseball team, in the stadiums' Hall of Fame, which is located under the Metropolitan Club.

== Categories ==
The categories for induction are:

- First 75 years of professional baseball (1858–1933)
- Former Chiefs/SkyChiefs player (1934–present)
- Professional baseball player or person affiliated with professional baseball
- Contributor to the game of baseball.

Through the 2012 season, the Syracuse Baseball Wall of Fame Committee included Ron Gersbacher, John Simone, Tex Simone, Bob Snyder, and Tom Leo.

== List of awardees ==
- 1998: Grover Cleveland Alexander, Red Barrett, Bill Dinneen, Dave Giusti, Mack Jones, Hank Sauer
- 1999: Jim Bottomley, Rob Gardner, Bill Kelly, Dutch Mele, Jimmy Outlaw, Lawrence Skiddy, Frank Verdi
- 2000: Jack Corbett, Jewel Ens, Tom Henke, Willie Horton, Bob Shawkey, Ed Shokes, Hooks Wiltse
- 2001: Len Boehmer, Johnny Gee, Dave Lemanczyk, Frank McCormick, Jim Northrup, Frank Schulte, Tex Simone
- 2002: Rick Bladt, Wally Cazen, Frank DiPino, Mike Dorgan, Anthony Henninger, Dixie Howell, Jim Walsh
- 2003: Mike Barlow, Dave Bergman, Tony Fernández, Sandy Griffin, Henry McCormick, Red Parton, Goody Rosen
- 2004: Mike Bragman, Dutch Dotterer, Howard Ehmke, Jack Fifield, Carden Gillenwater, Mickey Klutts, Willie Smith
- 2005: Dom Dallessandro, John Harmon, John Johnstone, Pepper Martin, Thurman Munson, Jim Owens, Vic Willis
- 2006: Alan Closter, Steve Grilli, Tom Higgins, Bob Keegan, Conny Murphy, Doc Scanlan, Frank Tepedino
- 2007: Dutch Dotterer, Jr., Ron Guidry, Fred McGriff, Dick Rockwell, Specs Toporcer, Otto Vélez
- 2008: Bobby Cox, Pat Gillick, Ted Kleinhans, Vic Power, Tommy Thevenow, Greg "Boomer" Wells, Terry Whitfield
- 2009: Cupid Childs, Babe Dahlgren, William Hofmann, Sr., Rick Leach, Gino Petralli, Jon Ratliff, Randy St. Claire
- 2010: Shawn Green, Earl Harrist, Chris Jones, Dick Ryan, Mickey Stanley, Don Waful
- 2011: Jerry Brooks, Lou Johnson, Joseph Kren, Gene Locklear, Gus Mancuso, Jim Prendergast
- 2012: Dan Clark, Carlos Delgado, Scott McGregor, Stu Pederson, Frank Riccelli, Philip S. Ryder
- 2013: Tomy de la Cruz, Bob Dustal, Don Gordon, Chick Hafey, Mal Mallette, Robert Perez
- 2016: Chad Mottola, Anton "Tony" Kreuzer, James "Jimmy" Durkin, Joel Mareiniss
- 2017: Sean McDonough, Tom Dotterer, Frank Calo, Jhonatan Solano
- 2018: Roy Halladay, Lew Carr, Tom Leo, Butch Alberts
- 2019: Ed Kranepool, Don Labbruzzo, Herm Card
- 2020/2021: Jason Grilli, Bob Southworth, Jack Morse, Danny Cavallo (2020 season cancelled, induction held in 2021)
- 2022: Phil Regan, Moses Fleetwood Walker, Mark Lukasiewicz, Dom Cambareri
- 2023: Robert Higgins, Bob Bailor, Bill Dutch
- 2024: Steven Souza Jr., Chiefs First/Re-organized Board of Directors Community Baseball Club of CNY, 2014 International League North Division Champion Syracuse Chiefs
- 2025: 1985 International League Regular Season Champion Syracuse Chiefs, Dan Hoard, Bob Snyder, Jody Pucello

== See also ==
- Baseball Hall of Fame (Cooperstown, New York)
- Sports in Syracuse
