= Futures at Fenway =

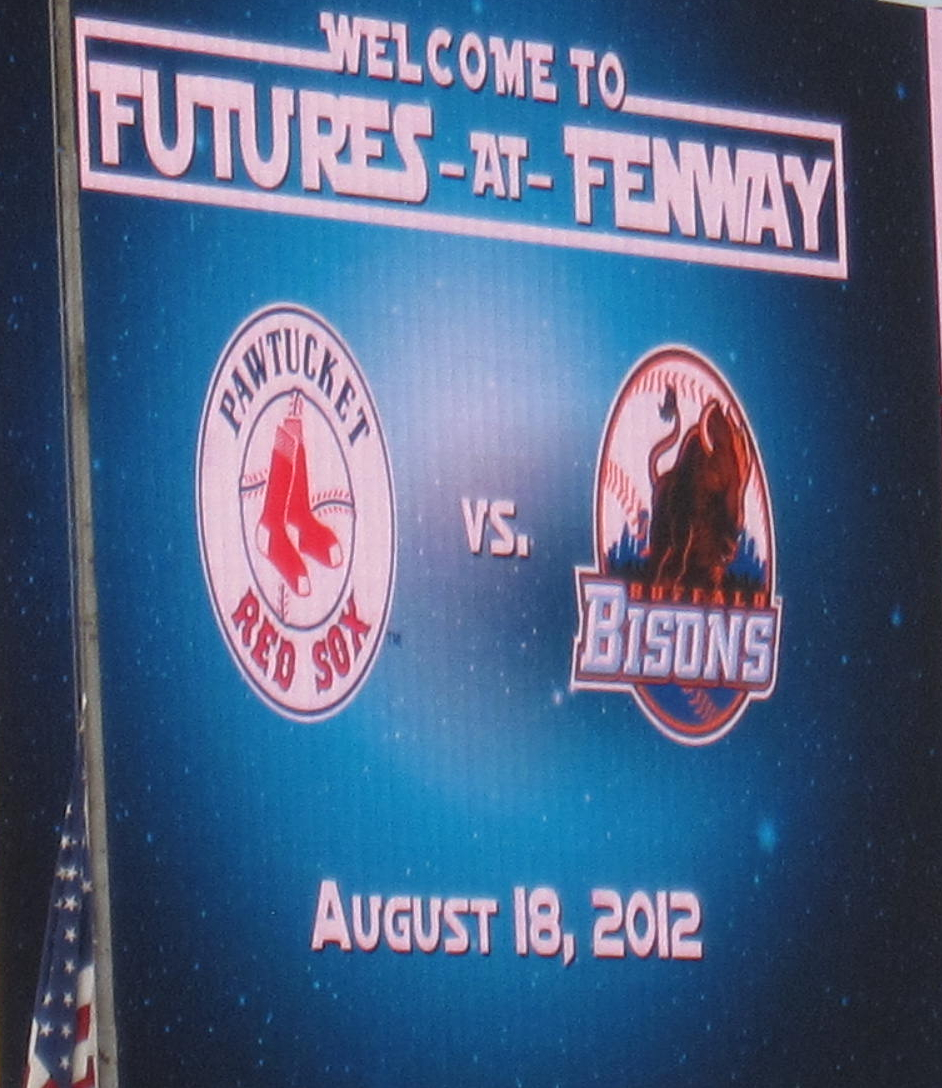
- Frequency: Annual
- Location: Fenway Park
- Years active: 9
- Inaugurated: August 26, 2006
- Most recent: July 13, 2014
- Previous event: July 27, 2013
- Participants: One or two Boston Red Sox minor league affiliates and opponent(s)
- Organizer: Boston Red Sox

"Futures at Fenway" was a baseball event held at Fenway Park in Boston from 2006 to 2014. It featured two minor-league affiliates of the Boston Red Sox playing a pair of regular-season games against teams from their own leagues from 2006 to 2012 (exception being the 2010 rainout) and one game in 2013 and 2014.

The brainchild of Boston mayor Thomas Menino, the inaugural Futures at Fenway in 2006 was believed to be the first minor-league game(s) played at Fenway since 1977, when the park hosted the Eastern League All-Star Game. They were the first regular-season minor-league games there since 1968, and simply because of the size of Fenway Park, the crowds are among the largest ever to see regular-season minor-league games.

== History ==
The first such event was held on August 26, 2006, with subsequent installments on August 11, 2007, and August 9, 2008. The 2011 edition, held on August 20, 2011, featured the Red Sox Double-A affiliate Portland Sea Dogs in the first game and the Triple-A Pawtucket Red Sox in the second. On August 18, 2012, a Red Sox Single-A affiliate, the Lowell Spinners, faced the Hudson Valley Renegades, and the Pawtucket Red Sox hosted the Buffalo Bisons. The day also featured a Star Wars theme with characters in attendance and a pre-game costume parade. In 2013, only one game was scheduled, as the Portland Sea Dogs were opposed by the Harrisburg Senators. Also, fans were allowed to bring their dogs into designated sections of the ballpark. The 2014 event was held on Sunday, July 13, and featured two Single-A teams, the Lowell Spinners opposed by the Mahoning Valley Scrappers. Again, fans were allowed to bring their dogs to the park. After the game, the movie Field of Dreams was shown. The event has not been held since.

In the first few years fans holding tickets were granted admission to both games, with the second game beginning approximately an hour after the end of the first. However, in later years, fans purchased tickets for specific seats, but each ticket remained valid for both games. In this sense, it is a traditional doubleheader, although it does not technically meet the definition. The event is notable not only because it features four teams playing in the same park on the same day, but because the games involved are from two leagues and two minor-league levels. The event is timed to coincide with a Red Sox road trip, freeing Fenway Park for the games. Additionally, prices for tickets and some concession items are less than their usual major-league levels.

The event was a success from an attendance standpoint: six of the seven events drew more than 13,000. The lowest attendance was for 2012, which drew 8,907, while the 2008 event drew 18,117. Overall, the seven Futures at Fenway classics drew an average of 15,041 fans; a figure far higher than the maximum capacities of the minor league clubs' respective ballparks.

== 2006 ==
=== Game 1 ===
The first game featured the Red Sox' single-A New York–Penn League affiliate, the Lowell Spinners, against the Oneonta Tigers. Lowell won the game 3-1 with all three of their runs coming in the 4th inning. The Spinners used 19 different players in the game, presumably so that everyone on the team could have the thrill of playing in Fenway Park. Spinners closing pitcher Joshua Papelbon, younger brother of Red Sox closer Jonathan Papelbon, received a large ovation when he entered the game in the 9th inning, and promptly retired the side to earn a save.

Team	1	2	3	4	5	6	7	8	9	R	H	E
Oneonta	1	0	0	0	0	0	0	0	0	1	7	0
Lowell	0	0	0	3	0	0	0	0	x	3	12	3

Box score for game 1

=== Game 2 ===
The second game of the doubleheader pitted the Red Sox' triple-A affiliate, the Pawtucket Red Sox, against their International League rival, the Rochester Red Wings. Down 1-0 in the 5th inning, Rochester's Kevin West hit a two-run home run onto the famed Green Monster to give the Red Wings the lead. The teams traded the lead back and forth for three more innings before Pawtucket's Carlos Peña hit a two-run shot of his own in the 8th, over the home bullpen in right-center field, to give the PawSox a 5-4 lead and eventually the win.

Before game 2, the Red Sox organization honored Pawtucket manager Ron Johnson for his 1000th career victory (which occurred on May 21, 2006), and PawSox owner Ben Mondor, who threw out the ceremonial first pitch.

Team	1	2	3	4	5	6	7	8	9	R	H	E
Rochester	0	0	0	0	2	0	1	1	0	4	11	0
Pawtucket	0	0	0	1	0	2	0	2	x	5	11	2

Box score for game 2

== 2007 ==
=== Game 1 ===
The Lowell Spinners were again the featured affiliate in the early game, this year playing against the Hudson Valley Renegades. Two early errors led to an unearned run for Hudson Valley in the 1st inning, but pitching soon took over, and there was no further scoring until the 8th. Lowell loaded the bases in both the 6th and 7th, but failed to score. Finally in the 8th, a single by Brett Lewis tied the game, and in the 9th, the Spinners would win it. Luis Segovia was hit by a pitch to lead off the inning, and scored on a two-out single by Jorge Jimenez. The game was completed in less than 2½ hours.

Team	1	2	3	4	5	6	7	8	9	R	H	E
Hudson Valley	1	0	0	0	0	0	0	0	0	1	6	1
Lowell	0	0	0	0	0	0	0	1	1	2	7	2

Box score for game 1

=== Game 2 ===
For the first time, the Sox' double-A team would get to play in Fenway, with the second game matching the Portland Sea Dogs against the Harrisburg Senators in an Eastern League contest. The Senators started with three runs in the 1st on a home run by Tony Blanco. Portland tied the game in the bottom of the 1st. Harrisburg added two in the 2nd and three more in the 4th to go up 8-3, but the Sea Dogs tied the game again in the bottom of the 6th. Andrew Pinckney led off with a solo homer, and the inning featured a dramatic two-run triple by Bubba Bell that hit the railing of the bullpen in deep center field.

Harrisburg got a solo homer from Steve Mortimer in the 8th to take a 9-8 lead. However, Portland would capitalize on a total of 13 walks in the game, getting three of them in the bottom of the 8th before the tying run scored on a wild pitch.

The Senators quickly loaded the bases in the top of the 9th, and following a base hit by Dee Brown, they led 11-9. However, in the bottom of the 9th, the Sea Dogs would pull off the dramatic comeback. A single, two walks, and a bunt scored one run to make the score 11-10. With the bases still loaded and no outs, Jay Johnson roped a two-run double down the line in left field for the 12-11 victory. The two teams combined for 24 hits, 17 walks, and 20 strikeouts in the high-scoring affair.

Team	1	2	3	4	5	6	7	8	9	R	H	E
Harrisburg	3	2	0	3	0	0	0	1	2	11	14	1
Portland	3	0	0	0	0	5	0	1	3	12	10	3

Box score for game 2

== 2008 ==
=== Game 1 ===
Will Middlebrooks' bases-loaded single in the 12th inning provided another dramatic victory for the Lowell Spinners, who once again beat the Hudson Valley Renegades in "walk-off" fashion. After the teams traded runs in the 1st inning, Anthony Scelfo cleared the low railing in Fenway Park's famous 420-foot "triangle" for a solo home run and a 2-1 Renegade lead in the 3rd. Middlebrooks answered with a two-run double in the bottom of the 3rd to put Lowell ahead for the first time, 3-2. Defense would then take over, with the teams combining for only three base hits, all singles, over the next five innings. In the top of the 9th with two runners on, Hudson Valley's Kyeong Kang hit a ground ball that was misplayed by Lowell first baseman Deshaun Brooks as he tried to charge it and keep the run from scoring. The play tied the game at 3 and sent it into extra innings.

Lowell advanced a runner to third base in the bottom of the 11th, but a diving play by Scelfo in center field ended the inning. In the bottom of the 12th, the Spinners loaded the bases with one out thanks to a single and two walks. Scelfo made another diving catch for the second out, but he could not come up with a third sensational grab to keep the game alive. Middlebrooks' game-winning hit fell just in front of Scelfo's dive to give him his third RBI of the game, and give Lowell the 4-3 victory.

Team	1	2	3	4	5	6	7	8	9	10	11	12	R	H	E
Hudson Valley	1	0	1	0	0	0	0	0	1	0	0	0	3	7	3
Lowell	1	0	2	0	0	0	0	0	0	0	0	1	4	12	1

Box score for game 1

=== Game 2 ===
In contrast to the first game, the Pawtucket Red Sox and Charlotte Knights played their game in a very quick 2 hours 19 minutes. Dusty Brown drove in Joe Thurston to give the PawSox a 1-0 lead in the 1st inning, but the Knights' Royce Huffman led off the 2nd with a double and later scored to tie it. Thurston answered in the bottom of the 3rd with a home run into the right-field bullpen, putting Pawtucket back ahead, 2-1. The real damage came in the bottom of the 4th, when Jeff Corsaletti, Gil Velazquez, and Jeff Bailey all connected for doubles in a three-run PawSox rally. Charlotte was able to get one run back in the top of the 7th when Huffman singled and later scored on a groundout, but the PawSox would cruise on to a 5-2 victory.

Team	1	2	3	4	5	6	7	8	9	R	H	E
Charlotte	0	1	0	0	0	0	1	0	0	2	6	0
Pawtucket	1	0	1	3	0	0	0	0	x	5	9	1

Box score for game 2

== 2011 ==
=== Game 1 ===
The opener matched the Binghamton Mets against the Portland Sea Dogs. Binghamton's Collin McHugh and Portland's Charlie Haeger were dominant on the mound, each holding the opponent scoreless over the first six innings and fanning six for the day. Binghamton scored in the 7th on back-to-back walks by Brahiam Maldonado and Allan Dykstra. A wild pitch and a throwing error allowed Maldonado to score, while Dykstra came home on a single by Jonathan Malo. Portland tied the game in the 8th, when Alex Hassan homered after Ryan Khoury had worked a leadoff walk.

The game went into extra innings and remained scoreless through the 10th. In the top of the 11th, singles by Juan Lagares, Niuman Romero, and Eric Campbell – scoring Lagares – put the Mets ahead by a run. Kai Gronauer followed with a 3-run homer into the Green Monster seats scoring Romero and Campbell. The Sea Dogs attempted a comeback in the bottom of the frame, as Ryan Dent led off with a single, and Jeremy Hazelbaker doubled, putting runners on second and third. After a ground-out, Jonathan Hee then singled home both Dent and Hazelbaker, but Portland would not score again.

Team	1	2	3	4	5	6	7	8	9	10	11	R	H	E
Binghamton	0	0	0	0	0	0	2	0	0	0	4	6	13	1
Portland	0	0	0	0	0	0	0	2	0	0	2	4	9	3

Box score for game 1

=== Game 2 ===
The Pawtucket Red Sox hosted the Syracuse Chiefs in the second game. Daniel Nava's solo home run in the first inning gave the PawSox their only run of the game. Syracuse quickly tied it in the top of the 2nd, as Matt Antonelli singled, advanced to second base on a passed ball, and scored on a base hit by Seth Bynum. Jesus Valdez singled home Steve Lombardozzi in the 5th to give the Chiefs the lead. The next inning, Bynum again drove home Antonelli, who had doubled, scoring the final run of the game.

Team	1	2	3	4	5	6	7	8	9	R	H	E
Syracuse	0	1	0	0	1	1	0	0	0	3	8	0
Pawtucket	1	0	0	0	0	0	0	0	0	1	6	0

Box score for game 2

== 2012 ==
=== Game 1 ===
After losing to Lowell in their 2007 and 2008 meetings, Hudson Valley was finally victorious at Fenway Park. With one out in the top of the 2nd, Joel Caminero doubled scoring Luke Maile. Ryan Dunn and Caminero then scored on a single by Jake DePew putting the Renegades ahead 3-0. In the bottom of the frame, Lowell's David Chester singled, advanced to second when Aneury Tavarez was hit by pitch, and scored on a base hit by Zach Kapstein. Hudson Valley scored a run in each of the 3rd and 4th innings and again in the 6th on a DePew solo home run which gave them a 6-1 lead.

Lowell did not score again until the 9th. Jake Davies tripled with one out. Mookie Betts singled plating Davies then scored on a double by Tavarez, who later scored on an error. Roberto Reyes drove home Matty Johnson to make the score 6-5, but there would be no comeback victory for the Spinners this year.

Team	1	2	3	4	5	6	7	8	9	R	H	E
Hudson Valley	0	3	1	1	0	1	0	0	0	6	8	1
Lowell	0	1	0	0	0	0	0	0	4	5	10	1

Box score for game 1

=== Game 2 ===
The Pawtucket Red Sox faced the Buffalo Bisons in the nightcap. Buffalo's Josh Satin began the 2nd inning with a walk, advanced to third on a Matt Tuiasosopo double, and scored on a fielder's choice. A 6th inning lead-off home run by the Bisons' Josh Rodriguez completed the scoring for the game. Four Buffalo pitchers limited the PawSox to five hits and one walk. Jonathan Hee recorded their only extra base hit, a 5th-inning double.

Team	1	2	3	4	5	6	7	8	9	R	H	E
Buffalo	0	1	0	0	0	1	0	0	0	2	6	0
Pawtucket	0	0	0	0	0	0	0	0	0	0	5	0

Box score for game 2

== 2013 ==
The Portland Sea Dogs defeated the Harrisburg Senators 5-2 in the sole game scheduled for this year's event. Harrisburg scored a run in the first, when Justin Bloxom's sacrifice fly drove home Brian Goodwin. In the second, Brian Jeroloman singled in Jason Martinson for the Senators' only other run of the game. Portland then scored 3 runs in the bottom of the frame. Christian Vázquez came home on a ground out by Shannon Wilkerson. Heiker Meneses followed with a double plating Travis Shaw and Derrik Gibson. Shaw hit a solo home run in the fourth inning putting the Sea Dogs ahead by 2. Their final run came in the seventh, as Garin Cecchini scored on a wild pitch. Keith Couch started for Portland and earned the win yielding only 2 runs on 2 hits over 7 innings. Matt Maloney recorded the save pitching a scoreless ninth.

Team	1	2	3	4	5	6	7	8	9	R	H	E
Harrisburg	1	1	0	0	0	0	0	0	0	2	5	0
Portland	0	3	0	1	0	0	1	0	x	5	7	1

Box score

== 2014 ==
Lowell scored first in the fourth inning, as Nick Longhi reached on an error, advanced to second on a Mike Meyers single, and scored on a single by Mauricio Dubon. Three Spinners pitchers held the Scrappers scoreless through 8-2/3 innings until Taylor Murphy singled off James Shepherd. Shane Rowland, Yonathan Mendoza, and Ordomar Valdez each followed with a walk, forcing home Murphy with the tying run. Oscar Perez entered the game in relief and hit Greg Allen, scoring Rowland with the go-ahead run. Doubles by Steven Patterson and Bradley Zimmer plated four more runs in the inning. Mahoning Valley's Luis Gomez pitched a scoreless eighth and ninth, earning the win.

Team	1	2	3	4	5	6	7	8	9	R	H	E
Mahoning Valley	0	0	0	0	0	0	0	0	6	6	12	1
Lowell	0	0	0	1	0	0	0	0	0	1	7	0

Box score
