= Dick Scott (shortstop) =

American baseball player and coach (born 1962)

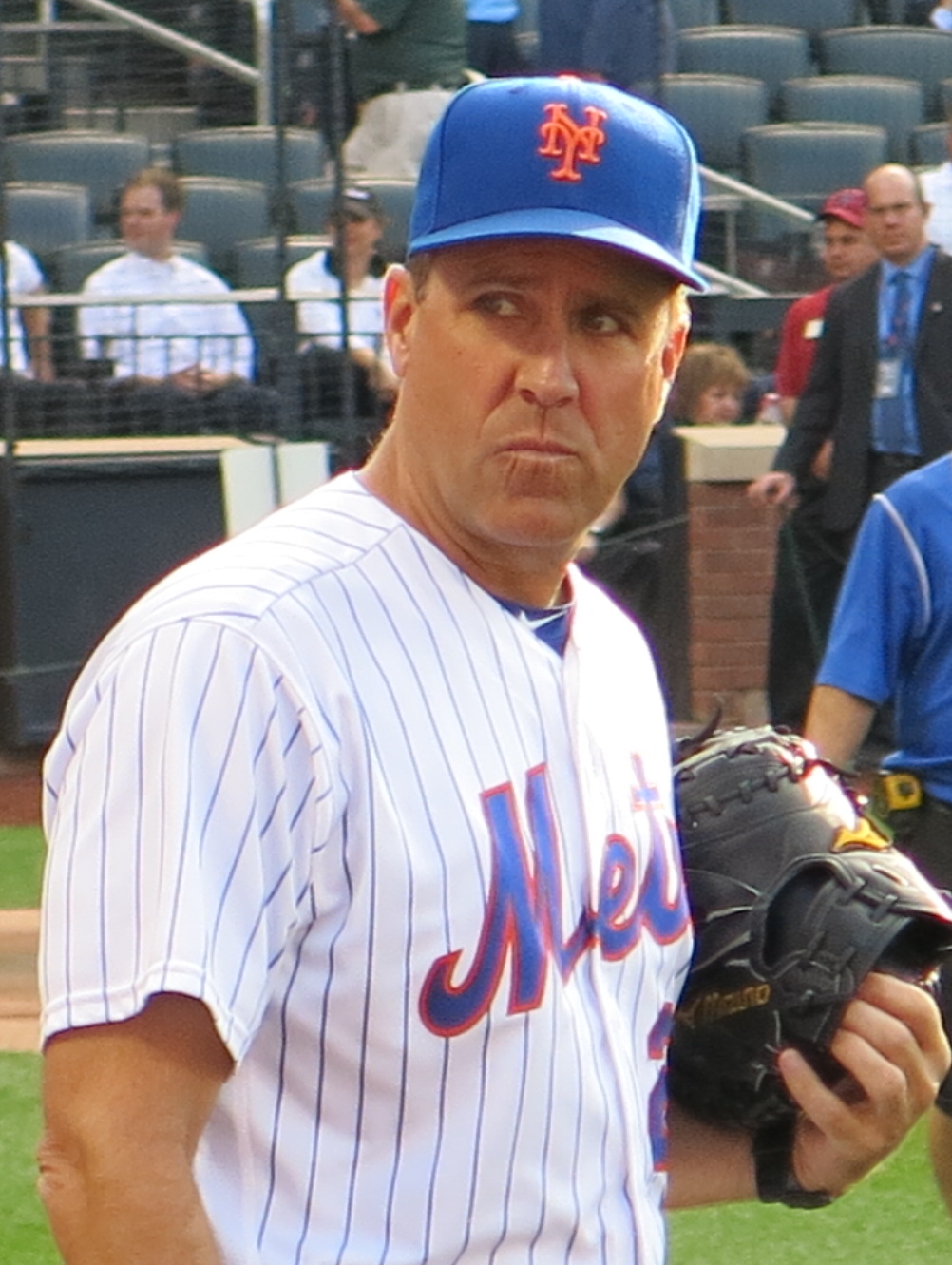
- Scott with the Mets in 2016
- Coach
- Born: July 19, 1962 (age 64); Ellsworth, Maine
- Batted: Right Threw: Right

MLB debut
- May 19, 1989, for the Oakland Athletics

Last MLB appearance
- May 29, 1989, for the Oakland Athletics

MLB statistics
- Batting average: .000
- Runs: 0
- Hits: 0
- Stats at Baseball Reference

Teams
- As player: Oakland Athletics (1989); As coach: New York Mets (2016–2017, 2022)

Richard Edward Scott (born July 19, 1962) is an American former professional baseball shortstop, who played in Major League Baseball (MLB) for the Oakland Athletics. He later served as a coach for the New York Mets.

== Career ==
=== Playing career ===
Scott appeared in three big league games during the 1989 season for the Oakland Athletics. He was drafted by the New York Yankees in the 17th round of the 1981 Major League Baseball draft. Scott played his first professional season with their rookie league Gulf Coast Yankees in 1981, and his last with Oakland's Triple-A Tacoma Rainiers in 1990.

=== Coaching career ===
Since retiring from the field, Scott has been a minor league manager for the Athletics and Arizona Diamondbacks, a scout for the Diamondbacks, player development director of the Toronto Blue Jays, and field coordinator of instruction for the Houston Astros and New York Mets. He also served as Director of Player Development for the Mets under Sandy Alderson, for whom Scott had previously worked in the Oakland organization.

On December 16, 2015, Scott was announced as the new bench coach of the Mets, succeeding Bob Geren. He served in the position through the 2016 and 2017 seasons before leaving the Mets to become player development director for the Miami Marlins.

In 2021, Scott returned to the Mets organization as coordinator of coaching development and instruction. After Glenn Sherlock tested positive for Covid-19 in 2022, Scott temporarily joined the Mets' MLB coaching staff as bench coach, beginning April 16, 2022.

Before the beginning of the 2023 season, Dick Scott was named manager of the Mets AAA affiliate, the Syracuse Mets
