= Rush University =

Private university in Chicago, Illinois, US

Coordinates: 41°52′29″N 87°40′08″W

- Former names: Rush Medical College (1837–1898); Rush Medical College at University of Chicago (1898–1942)
- Motto: Ministrare per scientiam (Latin)
- Motto in English: "Minister through scientific knowledge"
- Type: Private university
- Established: 1972; 54 years ago
- Accreditation: HLC
- Endowment: $929.1 million (2025)
- President: Robert S.D. Higgins
- Provost: Susan L. Freeman
- Students: 2,816
- Location: Chicago, Illinois, United States
- Campus: Large City, 8 acres (0.032 km^{2})
- Colors: Green; Gold
- Website: www.rushu.rush.edu

Rush University is a private university in Chicago, Illinois, United States. Founded in 1972, it is the academic arm of Rush University Medical Center.

Rush University comprises:

- Rush Medical College
- Rush University College of Nursing
- Rush University College of Health Sciences
- The Graduate College of Rush University

Rush encompasses a 664-bed hospital serving adults and children, the 61-bed Johnston R. Bowman Health Center and Rush University. The campus occupies an 8-acre (3.2 ha) site on Chicago's Near West Side, in the Illinois Medical District, which also includes its teaching hospital, Rush University Medical Center.

== History ==
=== Founding of Rush University ===
Rush University Medical Center dates back to March 2, 1837, when Rush Medical College received its charter. Daniel Brainard founded Rush Medical College in March 1837, two days before Chicago was chartered as a city. It took seven years from the granting of the charter before Rush Medical College opened officially on December 4, 1843—with 22 students enrolled in a 16-week course.

The college is named for Benjamin Rush, a signer of the Declaration of Independence and a Pennsylvania physician, who counted George Washington among his patients. He became a medical and humanitarian leader after the Revolutionary War. He was also a social activist, a prominent advocate for the abolition of slavery, for scientific education for the masses—including women—and for public medical clinics to treat the poor. At his death in 1813, he was the most celebrated physician in America.

In the manner of most medical schools in the 19th century, Rush was a proprietary institution owned and operated by a group of physicians who had joined Brainard in establishing practices in young Chicago. Presbyterian Hospital, Rush's teaching hospital, opened in 1884. Following the 1871 Great Chicago Fire, Rush abandoned its destroyed campus and rebuilt in the West Side neighborhood it occupies today.

By the end of that century, Rush was among the nation's largest and most distinguished medical schools, becoming a major supplier of physicians to rural areas in the Middle and far West. The college sought an academic affiliation with a major university, a common practice among independent medical schools of that era. In 1898, the school affiliated with the University of Chicago. During its first century of operation, more than 10,000 physicians received their training at Rush Medical College.

=== Mid-century ===
In 1942, its association with the University of Chicago came to an end, when Rush temporarily suspended its pre-clinical educational program in the face of World War II. In 1956, Chicago's St. Luke's Hospital accepted Presbyterian Hospital's invitation to merge to obtain the critical mass of resources of contemporary teaching medical centers.

Soon after, in response to a projected future need for physicians to serve the growing population of the state and the region, the charter for Rush Medical College was reactivated and the college merged with Presbyterian-St. Luke's Hospital. Rush-Presbyterian-St. Luke's Medical Center was formed, and in 1971, Rush Medical College reopened with a class of 66 first-year students and 33 third-year students. First-year entering class size reached 120 in 1976 and recently increased to 128 students.

=== Recent history ===
To emphasize its affiliation with Rush University and its status as an academic medical center, Rush-Presbyterian-St. Luke's Medical Center was renamed Rush University Medical Center in 2003.

== Colleges ==
=== College of Nursing ===
Rush University College of Nursing represents a combined heritage dating back to 1885, when its first antecedent, the St. Luke's Hospital Training School of Nursing, opened in 1885 to offer diploma education to nurses. In 1903, the Presbyterian Hospital School of Nursing accepted its first students. From 1956 to 1968, nurses were taught at the merged Presbyterian-St. Luke's Hospital School of Nursing. More than 7,500 nurses graduated from these three schools.

The first Bachelor of Science in Nursing and Master of Science in Nursing degrees were awarded in 1975; the first Doctor of Nursing Science degree was awarded in 1980; and the first Doctor of Nursing Practice degree was awarded in 1990. The Doctor of Philosophy in nursing was first awarded in 2007. Since the Rush University College of Nursing was established, 5,623 baccalaureate, master's and doctoral degrees have been awarded. In response to the increasing complexity in the health care system, and the increased responsibilities this places on nurses, Rush University College of Nursing discontinued the Bachelor of Science in nursing in 2009 and began offering a generalist entry master's (GEM) program, one of three in the city of Chicago to offer such a degree. This program is for students who already have a bachelor's degree in an area other than nursing. The focus of the program is the education of clinician leaders who are able to combine knowledge of systems and nursing care, the ability to build and manage teams, and apply evidence-based practice to improve patient outcomes. The first cohort of 44 students graduated in March 2010. Today, more than 175 master's and doctoral nursing students graduate each year.

=== College of Health Sciences ===
The College of Health Sciences at Rush University traces its origins to the School of Medical Technology sponsored by Presbyterian-St. Luke's Hospital from 1959 to 1972. The second largest school of its kind in Chicago, it provided a one-year professional internship program to more than 200 baccalaureate students in medical technology during its operation. In 1973, the School of Medical Technology was one of the first internship programs in the country to convert to a two-year baccalaureate degree program. The program is built around a core of basic and advanced theoretical knowledge and clinical practice. The School became part of Rush's College of Nursing and Allied Health Sciences in 1973. In 1975, the College of Health Sciences separated from the College of Nursing and, along with what was then the Graduate School, became an independent college.

In 1978, in response to a growing need for occupational therapy professionals, the university developed an occupational therapy program, beginning with a post-professional graduate program in occupational therapy in 1980, which was reconfigured in 1986 to an entry-level professional program that matriculated 11 full-time and two part-time students. The Health Systems Management Program was launched in 1979, to complement the clinical curricula with a program to educate health care administrators.

The Department of Communication Disorders and Sciences was established in 1980. Since that time, the college has added the departments Respiratory Therapy; Clinical Nutrition; Medical Physics; Physician Assistant; Perfusion Technology; Vascular Ultrasound; and Religion, Health and Human Values to form the current College of Health Sciences. The college currently offers two doctoral programs, nine programs at the master's level, and bachelor's programs in clinical laboratory sciences, perfusion technology and vascular ultrasound.

=== The Graduate College ===
The Graduate College at Rush University was established as a separate academic unit in January 1981, having previously been organized as the Graduate School within the College of Health Sciences. The Graduate College is responsible for educational programs in basic sciences and offers master's and doctoral degrees in ten disciplines. In addition to doctoral programs in basic sciences and in nursing since 2007, the graduate college offers a Master of Science in Clinical Research and in Biotechnology.

== See also ==
- Illinois Medical District
