= Syracuse Mets =

Minor League Baseball team based in Syracuse, New York

- Founded in 1934; Syracuse, New York

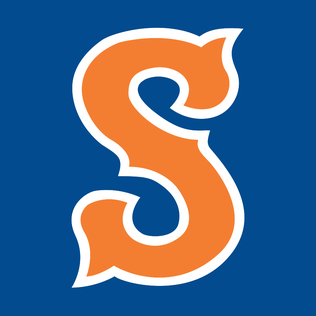
Team logo	Cap insignia

Minor league affiliations
- Class: Triple-A (1961–present)
- Previous classes: Class A (1956–1957); Triple-A (1946–1955); Double-A (1934–1945)
- League: International League (1961–present)
- Division: East Division
- Previous leagues: Eastern League (1956–1957); International League (1934–1955)

Major league affiliations
- Team: New York Mets (2019–present)
- Previous teams: Washington Nationals (2009–2018); Toronto Blue Jays (1978–2008); New York Yankees (1967–1977); Detroit Tigers (1963–1966); New York Mets/Washington Senators (1962); Minnesota Twins (1961); Detroit Tigers (1956–1957); Philadelphia Phillies (1954–1955); Cincinnati Reds (1942–1950); Pittsburgh Pirates (1940); Cincinnati Reds (1937–1938); Boston Red Sox (1934–1936)

Minor league titles
- League titles (8): 1935; 1942; 1943; 1947; 1954; 1969; 1970; 1976
- Division titles (2): 1989; 2014
- Wild card berths (1): 1998

Team data
- Name: Syracuse Mets (2019–present)
- Previous names: Syracuse Chiefs (2007–2018); Syracuse SkyChiefs (1997–2006); Syracuse Chiefs (1934–1957, 1961–1996)
- Colors: Blue, orange, white
- Mascot: Scooch
- Ballpark: NBT Bank Stadium (1997–present)
- Previous parks: MacArthur Stadium (1934–1957, 1961–1996)
- Owner/ Operator: Diamond Baseball Holdings
- General manager: Jason Smorol
- Manager: Dick Scott
- Website: milb.com/syracuse

The Syracuse Mets are a Minor League Baseball team of the International League and the Triple-A affiliate of the New York Mets. They are located in Syracuse, New York, and play their home games at NBT Bank Stadium, which opened in 1997 and has a seating capacity of 10,815.

The Mets are named for their major league affiliate and former owner, the New York Mets. In August 2025 they announced that they would be rebranding for the 2027 season. A "re-name the team" contest would be held to come up with name ideas, followed by fan voting and a reveal of the new team identity in fall 2026.

From 1934 to 1957, 1961 to 1996, and from 2007 to 2018, the team was named the Syracuse Chiefs, while from 1997 to 2006 it was named the Syracuse SkyChiefs. When the club was purchased by the New York Mets in October 2018, it was renamed the Syracuse Mets. The team is set to be rebranded back to Syracuse Chiefs for the start of the 2028 season after a trademark issue prevented them from doing so prior to the 2027 season.

== History ==
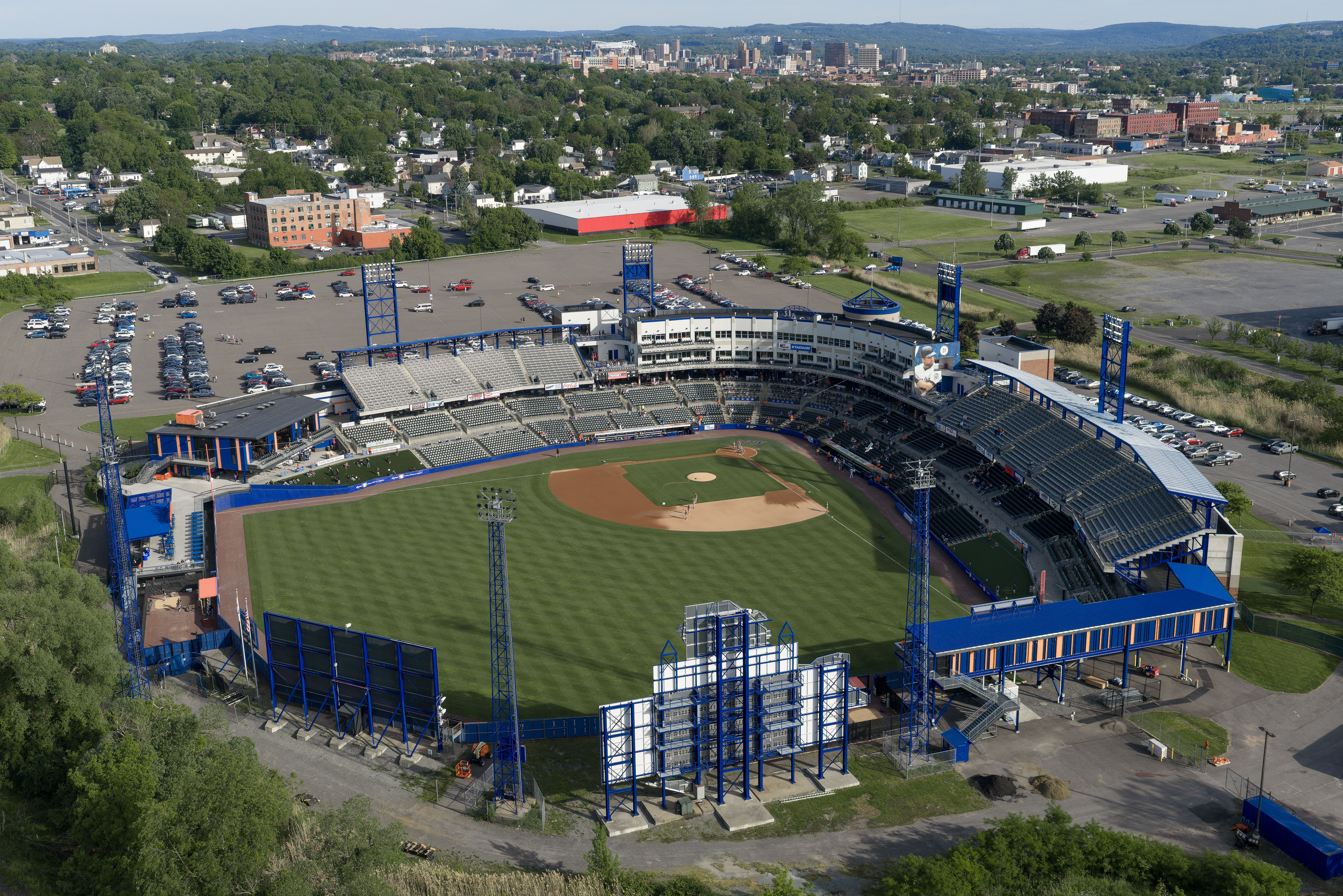
NBT Bank Stadium, the home of the Syracuse Mets

=== Syracuse Chiefs ===
==== Establishment (1934–1957) ====
The Syracuse Chiefs baseball team was established in 1934, when the Jersey City Skeeters moved to Syracuse and were renamed the Chiefs. The team played in the International League (IL) through 1955. They won five Governors' Cup championships during this stretch, including back-to-back championships in 1942 and 1943. The team was then sold and moved to Miami as the Marlins for the 1956 campaign. Another team known as the Syracuse Chiefs competed in the Class A Eastern League (then two levels below the IL) in 1956 and 1957, but moved to Allentown, Pennsylvania, on July 13, 1957. The Chiefs played at MacArthur Stadium from 1934 to 1996, moving to new then-P&C Stadium (1997–2005) in 1997.

==== Restart and multiple affiliations (1961–1978) ====
Syracuse was without professional baseball from 1957 until 1961, when the Montreal Royals franchise was abandoned by its owners (the Los Angeles Dodgers) and relocated to Syracuse as the top affiliate of the Minnesota Twins, becoming the Syracuse Chiefs. After that, the team had affiliations with the New York Mets and Washington Senators (1962), the Detroit Tigers (1963) and the New York Yankees (1967–1977). Baseball has been played in Syracuse without interruption since the rebirth of the Chiefs in 1961.

==== Toronto Blue Jays (1978–2008) ====
From 1978 to 2008, the Chiefs were the Triple-A affiliate of the Toronto Blue Jays. The three-decade Toronto–Syracuse affiliation is the longest of the 11 major league affiliations the team has had since 1936. While the Chiefs reached three Governors Cup finals during this time, many of the players who helped lead the Blue Jays to consecutive World Series titles in 1992 and 1993 passed through Syracuse. In 1994, outfielder Shawn Green hit .344 for the Chiefs, winning the International League batting title and the International League Rookie of the Year Award. In 1997, due to the team having a Native American nickname and using Native American imagery, it was renamed the SkyChiefs. The name was reverted to "Chiefs" in December 2006, and the team's logo featured a steam locomotive.

==== Washington Nationals (2008–2018) ====
On September 20, 2008, the Chiefs signed a two-year affiliation agreement with the Washington Nationals, ending their relationship with the Blue Jays. That first season, the players wore a decal on their uniforms with the letters "HB" to commemorate Harold Berman, former member of the team's board of directors, who died after the 2007 season. In 2009, the Chiefs wore a decal on their uniforms with the letters "HM" to commemorate Hy Miller, former state assemblyman and former member of the team's board of directors, who died after the 2008 season.

In 2010, the Chiefs celebrated their 50th season of community-owned baseball (1961–2010), wearing 1961 jerseys for every Thursday home game. The team brought back radio announcers from the past, such as Dan Hoard and Syracuse University alumnus Sean McDonough. They had a 76–67 win–loss record, with pitching prospect Stephen Strasburg winning two games and losing one in five appearances.

In 2011, the Chiefs, wore throwback jerseys for every Thursday home game to commemorate the 35th anniversary of their last International League Governors' Cup championship team (managed by Syracuse Wall of Fame member Bobby Cox). The Chiefs added four alternate jerseys to their rotation for the season: one for Latin American Day, a second for Jackie Robinson Day (commemorating Negro league uniforms), a third for national holidays such as Independence Day and Memorial Day, and a fourth for Breast Cancer Awareness Night. The team played the Pawtucket Red Sox on August 20 at Fenway Park as part of a doubleheader in conjunction with the sixth annual Futures at Fenway event, featuring games involving Boston Red Sox minor league teams. The Chiefs, behind starter Brad Meyers, defeated the PawSox 3–1 before more than 29,000 fans. At Alliance Bank Stadium (now NBT Bank Stadium) the Chiefs added a "Home Plate Club" to the stadium: premium seating in the first four rows behind home plate, with waitstaff for merchandise, food and drinks.

On May 14, Chiefs DH Michael Aubrey went four for four, hitting four home runs in an 11–0 victory over the Durham Bulls and becoming the second player in team history to hit four home runs in a game; Gene Locklear was the first, on July 14, 1977. On August 27, Stephen Strasburg pitched his only rehab game for the Chiefs, against the Rochester Red Wings. Giving up two hits in the sixth inning (his only hits allowed before departing, with the Chiefs leading 1–0), he received no decision in Syracuse's 4–3 win. It did, however, clinch the Chiefs' third Thruway Cup victory; the team's other wins were in 1999 and 2010. The club's record for the season was 66–74, 14 games out of first place and fourth place in the six-team North Division.

On April 5, 2012, the Chiefs opened at home against the Rochester Red Wings. Top draft pick Bryce Harper, later that month promoted to the Nationals, made the opening-day roster. Randy Knorr did not return for a second season as manager, and Tony Beasley was promoted from the Harrisburg Senators. The Chiefs played all 16 of their games against the Scranton/Wilkes Barre Yankees at the now renamed Alliance Bank Stadium (2005–2013) due to stadium renovations at the Yankees' ballpark in Moosic, Pennsylvania. On May 7, the Chiefs unveiled a new high-definition video board in left field, replacing the board which had been in place since the stadium's 1997 opening.

The 2013 season, with manager Tony Beasley in his second season with the team, began on April 4 in Allentown, Pennsylvania, against the Lehigh Valley IronPigs; the Chiefs' home opener was eight days later against the IronPigs. On Throwback Thursdays, the team wore jerseys from 1983 to 1996.

On September 30, 2013, it was announced that 16-year general manager John Simone and any family members associated with the team, including assistant GM Mike Vounitas, were fired. On October 8, former Auburn Doubledays general manager Jason Smorol became the Chiefs' GM, with Jason Horbal as his assistant. It was the first time since 1970 that someone not named Simone was general manager of Syracuse; John Simone had taken over the job from his father, Anthony (Tex) Simone, in 1997.

The Chiefs opened their 2014 season on April 3 with a loss at home to the Scranton/Wilkes-Barre RailRiders and finished the season with the best record (81–62) in the International League, clinching a playoff spot for the first time since 1998 and the first IL North Division title since 1989. NBT Bank Stadium hosted its first ever playoff game on September 5, 2014, a 7–6 loss to the Pawtucket Red Sox which capped off a 3–0 first round series sweep for the Red Sox. The season featured an aggressive promotional campaign, including Social Media Monday, Two-for-One Tickets on Tuesday, Winning Wednesday, Dollar Thursday, Fireworks Friday, Giveaway Saturday, and Family Sunday. The Chiefs sold out the outfield wall, the dugouts, and the field tarp, earning $500,000 in advertising.

Following the 2014 season, the Chiefs would not make the playoffs during the final years of the Nationals' affiliation, including a 54–87 record during the 2017 season, their worst since 1966. Many prospects passed through Syracuse on their way to MLB, including Trea Turner, Lucas Giolito, and Victor Robles. Randy Knorr replaced Gardner Jr. after 4 seasons as Chiefs' manager for the 2018 season, his second stint with the Chiefs.

=== Syracuse Mets ===
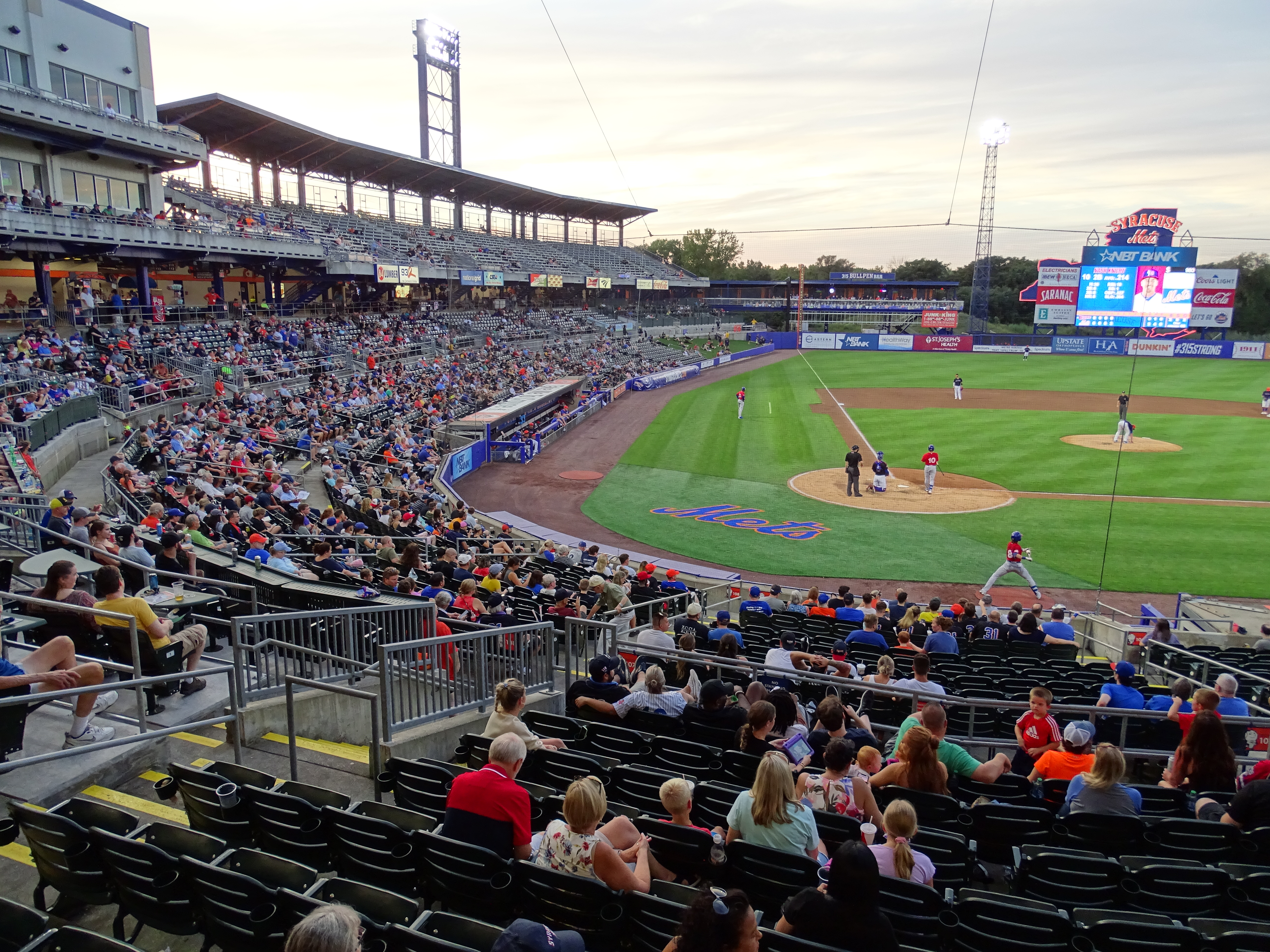
2021 game against the Buffalo Bisons at NBT Bank Stadium

The chief operating officer of the New York Mets, Jeff Wilpon, joined Governor Andrew Cuomo and Joanie Mahoney, Onondaga County Executive, at NBT Bank Stadium on October 11, 2017, to announce that the Mets would purchase the Chiefs from the Community Baseball Club of Central New York in early 2018. Under the deal, the Chiefs' affiliation with the Washington Nationals continued through the end of the 2018 season, with the Chiefs becoming the Mets' Triple-A affiliate beginning with the 2019 season. The team was rebranded as the Syracuse Mets, adopting the New York Mets' blue, orange, and white color scheme along with new logos and uniforms on October 16, 2018. This name was pressed upon the city and team without any imput from the community. Those who encouraged the sale of the team said they were not aware of Jeff Wilpon's intention to rebrand the team once the sale was approved. This rebrand was highly unpopular with fans and locals and still is to this day.

The Syracuse Mets started their 2019 inaugural season with one of the most experienced rosters in the minor leagues. Of the 25 players on the roster, 21 of them had previously played in the majors. They had combined for 7,006 total games. The Opening Day roster consisted of veteran outfielders Carlos Gómez and Rajai Davis, former Syracuse Chief Danny Espinosa, catcher René Rivera, and cult-star outfielder Tim Tebow. The Mets played their first game on April 4, against the Pawtucket Red Sox in front of an Opening Day home crowd of 8,823 fans. Syracuse took a 3–2 lead in the bottom of the sixth inning, but Pawtucket tied the game in the top of the eighth. The PawSox scored three more runs in the top of the tenth, defeating the home team, 6–3. The Mets' first win came in game one of a doubleheader on April 6 in which they defeated Pawtucket, 6–3 in 7 innings. In that same first Mets win, with one out in the bottom of the fourth inning, Dilson Herrera hit the Syracuse Mets first home run.

On May 31, 2019, Travis Taijeron hit the first cycle in Syracuse Mets history in a 13–4 win over the PawSox. It was the first in franchise history since 1987. Rubén Tejada also hit for the cycle on June 19, 2019, against the Charlotte Knights. Despite his efforts, the Mets lost 9–7.

At the 2019 All-star break, the Mets were 42–47, good for 5th place in the IL North Division. After August 7, they made up 6.5 games in the standings to put themselves in a share of the division lead with the Scranton/Wilkes-Barre RailRiders after sweeping a doubleheader versus the Lehigh Valley IronPigs on August 26. They also had a winning season for the first time since 2014. Syracuse went into the final weekend of the 2019 season tied with Scranton/Wilkes-Barre for the division lead. Both teams split both of their respective series' to stay tied for the division lead. The two teams played a one-game tie breaker in order to decide who would win the division, and ultimately make the playoffs. The Mets would lose the one-game tiebreaker by a score of 14–13. Syracuse had led 13–6 going into the bottom of the eighth inning, but Scranton/Wilkes-Barre would come back and score eight runs in the bottom half of the inning to eventually win the game, effectively eliminating the Mets from qualifying for the playoffs.

The 2020 season was cancelled due to the COVID-19 pandemic. In conjunction with Major League Baseball's restructuring of Minor League Baseball in 2021, the Mets were organized into the 20-team Triple-A East. The start of the season was pushed back to May.

Aside from winning on 2021 Opening Day, the Mets got off to a slow start, ending the month of May with an 8–16 record. The struggles continued in the month of June, where they endured a 15-game losing streak from June 6 to June 24. The 2021 regular season will be followed by the Triple-A Final Stretch, a 10-game tournament among all 30 Triple-A clubs, wherein the team with the best winning percentage over that stretch will receive a prize from Major League Baseball.

On August 29, 2021, the Syracuse Mets tied with the Rochester Red Wings to finish a game for the first time in franchise history. With the game tied at 3 in the bottom of the 7th inning, a 40-minute rain delay was in place before the game was called due to the rain. The game was ruled as a tie because the two teams would not play each other again that season.

In 2022, the Triple-A East became known as the International League, the name historically used by the regional circuit prior to the 2021 reorganization.

On December 10, 2024, Diamond Baseball Holding Group purchased the team from New York Mets Owner Steven Cohn who owned the last remaining ownership interest of Sterling Equities. Sterling Equities was the official owner of the team from 2018-2024. The new ownership group opened up the way for the team to return to their Syracuse Chiefs name for the 2028 season and remove Syracuse Mets branding all over NBT Bank Stadium.

== Roster ==
Syracuse Mets roster
Players		Coaches/Other
Pitchers: 40 Zach Franklin; 62 Saul Garcia; 99 Gary Gill Hill; 64 Ofreidy Gomez; 65 Dan Hammer; 27 Ryan Lambert; 45 Tyler McLoughlin; 30 Jonathan Santucci; 46 Ben Simon; 49 Garrett Stratton; 51 Matt Turner; 57 Jack Wenninger	Catchers: 29 Kevin Parada; Infielders: 11 Billy Amick; 20 Ryan Clifford; 26 Nick Lorusso; -- Kyren Paris; 50 Émilien Pitre; 4 Jefferson Rojas; Outfielders: 70 D'Andre Smith	Manager: 23 Dick Scott; Coaches: 44 Nate Irving (hitting); 58 Troy Miller (assistant pitching); 35 John Nogowski (bench); 44 A. J. Sager (pitching); 7-day injured list; * On New York Mets 40-man roster; ~ Development list; # Rehab assignment; ∞ Reserve list; ‡ Restricted list; § Suspended list; † Temporarily inactive list; Roster updated November 9, 2026; Transactions; → More rosters: MiLB • International League; → New York Mets minor league players

== Ownership ==
=== Community Baseball Club, Inc. ===
The franchise was owned by the Community Baseball Club of Central New York, Inc., "a community-owned club, controlled by a [13-person] board of directors," acting on behalf of approximately 4,000 shareholders, who together held 15,857 shares from 1961 to 2017.

According to Dick Ryan, a former club chairman of the board and treasurer, a majority of the Community Baseball Club shares were "owned by people who own one or two shares." Shares in the club were first sold in 1961, at a price of $10 each; as of 2011, shares had a resale value of approximately $126, but were not publicly traded. A provision in the Chief's certificate of corporation stated that "no one may vote more than 500 shares." This provision was intended to make it difficult for the club to be sold and moved to another location, as happened earlier in its history.

=== New York Mets ===
In October 2017, the New York Mets, headed by then-Mets owner Jeff Wilpon, agreed to purchase the Chiefs for approximately $18 million pending approval by team shareholders. A vote was held on November 17, 2017, in which 88 percent of shareholders voted in favor of selling the team, thus meeting the required two-thirds vote needed for approval. The Mets organization assumed ownership in early 2018.

=== Diamond Baseball Holdings ===
In December 2024, Diamond Baseball Holdings (DBH) purchased the team from Steve Cohn, who owned the last remaining ownership interest of Sterling Equities. DBH is an American sports ownership and management group that operates other Minor League Baseball in the United States and Canada. It was established in 2021 by media conglomerate Endeavor and is a subsidiary of the investment firm Silver Lake.

== Titles and pennants ==
=== Syracuse Chiefs ===
==== Governors' Cup ====
The Chiefs won the Governors' Cup (the IL championship) 8 times, and played in the championship series 17 times.

- 1935 – Defeated Montreal, 4–2
- 1942 – Defeated Jersey City, 4–2
- 1943 – Defeated Toronto, 4–1
- 1946 – Lost to Montreal, 4–3
- 1947 – Defeated Buffalo, 4–1
- 1948 – Lost to Montreal, 4–0
- 1951 – Lost to Montreal, 4–3
- 1954 – Defeated Montreal, 4–2
- 1964 – Lost to Rochester, 4–1
- 1969 – Defeated Columbus, 4–1
- 1970 – Defeated Columbus, 4–1
- 1974 – Lost to Rochester, 4–3
- 1975 – Lost to Tidewater, 4–3
- 1976 – Defeated Richmond, 4–1
- 1979 – Lost to Columbus, 3–1
- 1994 – Lost to Richmond, 3–0 (All games aired on ESPN, due to the MLB strike)

The Chiefs won the International League pennant — finishing the regular season with the best record in the league — eight times.

==== Junior World Series ====
The Chiefs played in the Junior World Series five times, winning it once, in 1970 against the Omaha Royals, 4–1.

== Season standings ==
Regular season champions	League champions	Division champions	Wild Card berth

Season	League	Division	Affiliate	Manager	Regular season					Postseason
Season	League	Division	Affiliate	Manager	Division finish	W	L	Win%	GB	Postseason
Original Syracuse Chiefs
1934	IL (AA)	—	Boston Red Sox	Andy High; Bill Sweeney	7th	60	94	.390	33.5	Did not qualify
1935	IL	—	Boston Red Sox	Nemo Leibold	2nd	87	67	.565	5	Won semi-finals vs. Newark, 4–0; Won Governors Cup vs. Montreal, 4–3
1936	IL	—	Boston Red Sox	Nemo Leibold; Mike Kelly	7th	59	95	.383	35	Did not qualify
1937	IL	—	Cincinnati Reds	Mike Kelly	3rd	78	74	.513	31	Lost semi-finals vs. Newark, 0–4
1938	IL	—	Cincinnati Reds	Jim Bottomley; Dick Porter	2nd	87	67	.565	18	Lost semi-finals (Playoff data missing)
1939	IL	—	None	Dick Porter	5th	81	74	.523	9	Did not qualify
1940	IL	—	Pittsburgh	Dick Porter	7th	71	90	.441	27	Did not qualify
1941	IL	—	None	Bennie Borgmann	6th	70	83	.458	29	Did not qualify
1942	IL	—	Cincinnati	Jewel Ens	3rd	78	74	.513	13.5	Won semi-finals vs. Montreal, 4–1; Won Governors Cup vs. Jersey City, 4–0; Lost Junior World Series vs. Columbus, 1–4
1943	IL	—	Cincinnati	Jewel Ens	3rd	82	71	.536	13.5	Won semi-finals vs. Newark 4–2; Won Governors Cup vs. Toronto 4–2; Lost Junior World Series vs. Columbus 1–4
1944	IL	—	Cincinnati	Jewel Ens	8th	68	84	.447	16	Did not qualify
1945	IL	—	Cincinnati	Jewel Ens	7th	64	89	.418	31	Did not qualify
1946	IL (AAA)	—	Cincinnati	Jewel Ens	2nd	81	72	.529	18.5	Won semi-finals vs. Baltimore 4–2; Lost Governors Cup vs. Montreal 1–4
1947	IL	—	Cincinnati	Jewel Ens	3rd	88	65	.575	5.5	Won semi-finals vs. Montreal 4–0; Won Governors Cup vs. Buffalo 4–3; Lost Junior World Series vs. Milwaukee 3–4
1948	IL	—	Cincinnati	Jewel Ens	3rd	77	73	.513	15.5	Won semi-finals vs. Newark 4–3; Lost Governors Cup vs. Montreal 1–4
1949	IL	—	Cincinnati	Jewel Ens	6th	73	80	.477	16.5	Did not qualify
1950	IL	—	Cincinnati	Bruno Betzel	6th	74	79	.484	19	Did not qualify
1951	IL	—	None	Bruno Betzel	3rd	82	71	.536	12.5	Won semi-finals vs. Rochester 4–1; Lost Governors Cup vs. Montreal 1–4
1952	IL	—	None	Bruno Betzel	2nd	88	66	.571	8.5	Lost semi-finals vs. Rochester 0–4
1953	IL	—	None	Bruno Betzel	7th	58	95	.379	38.5	Did not qualify
1954	IL	—	Philadelphia	Skeeter Newsome	4th	79	76	.510	18.5	Won semi-finals vs. Toronto 4–2; Won Governors Cup vs. Montreal 4–3; Lost Junior World Series vs. Louisville 2–4
1955	IL	—	Philadelphia	Skeeter Newsome	5th	74	79	.484	20.5	Did not qualify
Syracuse Chiefs (Eastern League)
1956	Eastern (A)	—	Detroit	Glenn McQuillen; Joe Torpey; Frank Calo	5th	62	77	.446	22.5	Did not qualify
1957	Eastern (A)	—	Detroit	Frank Calo	5th	56	84	.400	29	Did not qualify (Team moved to Allentown, Pennsylvania, July 13, 1957)
Second Syracuse Chiefs
1961	IL	—	Minnesota	Gene Verble; Frank Verdi	8th	56	98	.364	36	Did not qualify
1962	IL	—	Washington; New York (NL)	Johnny Vander Meer; Frank Verdi	8th	53	101	.344	41	Did not qualify
1963	IL	North	Detroit	Bob Swift	1st	80	70	.533	—	Lost semi-finals vs. Indianapolis 1–4
1964	IL	—	Detroit	Bob Swift	2nd	88	66	.571	2.5	Won semi-finals vs. Buffalo 4–3; Lost Governors Cup vs. Rochester 2–4
1965	IL	—	Detroit	Frank Carswell	4th	74	73	.503	11.5	Lost semi-finals vs. Columbus 2–4
1966	IL	—	Detroit	Frank Carswell	8th	54	93	.367	29	Did not qualify
1967	IL	—	New York (AL)	Gary Blaylock	8th	63	77	.367	17.5	Did not qualify
1968	IL	—	New York (AL)	Gary Blaylock; Frank Verdi	T-5th	72	75	.490	11	Did not qualify
1969	IL	—	New York (AL)	Frank Verdi	3rd	75	65	.536	3.5	Won semi-finals vs. Louisville 3–2; Won Governors Cup vs. Columbus 4–1
1970	IL	—	New York (AL)	Frank Verdi	1st	84	56	.600	—	Won semi-finals vs. Tidewater 3–0; Won Governors Cup vs. Columbus 3–1; Won Junior World Series vs. Omaha 4–1
1971	IL	—	New York (AL)	Loren Babe	4th	73	67	.521	13	Lost semi-finals vs. Rochester 1–3
1972	IL	—	New York (AL)	Frank Verdi	7th	64	80	.444	17	Did not qualify
1973	IL	American	New York (AL)	Bobby Cox	3rd	76	70	.521	3	Did not qualify
1974	IL	North	New York (AL)	Bobby Cox	2nd	74	70	.514	14	Won semi-finals vs. Richmond 4–1; Lost Governors Cup vs. Rochester 3–4
1975	IL	—	New York (AL)	Bobby Cox	3rd	72	64	.529	11.5	Won semi-finals vs. Rochester 3–1; Lost Governors Cup vs. Tidewater 1–3
1976	IL	—	New York (AL)	Bobby Cox	2nd	82	57	.590	6.5	Won semi-finals vs. Memphis 3–0; Won Governors Cup vs. Richmond 3–1
1977	IL	—	New York (AL)	Pete Ward	5th	70	70	.500	10	Did not qualify
1978	IL	—	Toronto	Vern Benson	8th	50	90	.357	35	Did not qualify
1979	IL	—	Toronto	Vern Benson	2nd	77	63	.550	8.5	Won semi-finals vs. Richmond 3–2; Lost Governors Cup vs. Columbus 3–4
1980	IL	—	Toronto	Harry Warner	8th	58	81	.417	24.5	Did not qualify
1981	IL	—	Toronto	Bob Humphreys	7th	60	80	.429	28.5	Did not qualify
1982	IL	—	Toronto	Jim Beauchamp	6th	64	76	.457	18.5	Did not qualify
1983	IL	—	Toronto	Jim Beauchamp	7th	61	78	.439	21.5	Did not qualify
1984	IL	—	Toronto	Jim Beauchamp	7th	58	81	.417	24	Did not qualify
1985	IL	—	Toronto	Doug Ault	1st	79	61	.564	—	Lost semi-finals vs. Columbus 1–3
1986	IL	—	Toronto	Doug Ault	5th	72	67	.518	7.5	Did not qualify
1987	IL	—	Toronto	Doug Ault	6th	68	72	.486	13	Did not qualify
1988	IL	West	Toronto	Bob Bailor	2nd	70	71	.496	7	Did not qualify
1989	IL	East	Toronto	Bob Bailor	1st	83	62	.572	—	Lost Governors Cup vs. Richmond 1–3
1990	IL	East	Toronto	Bob Bailor	3rd	62	83	.428	27	Did not qualify
1991	IL	East	Toronto	Bob Bailor	3rd	73	71	.507	6.5	Did not qualify
1992	IL	East	Toronto	Nick Leyva	4th	60	83	.420	24.5	Did not qualify
1993	IL	East	Toronto	Nick Leyva; Bob Didier	5th	59	82	.418	15.5	Did not qualify
1994	IL	East	Toronto	Bob Didier	2nd	71	71	.500	7	Won semi-finals vs. Pawtucket 3–1; Lost Governors Cup vs. Richmond 0–3
1995	IL	East	Toronto	Bob Didier; Héctor Torres; Richie Hebner	5th	59	82	.418	13.5	Did not qualify
1996	IL	East	Toronto	Richie Hebner	4th	67	75	.472	11	Did not qualify
Syracuse SkyChiefs
1997	IL	East	Toronto	Garth Iorg	4th	55	87	.387	28.5	Did not qualify
1998	IL	North	Toronto	Terry Bevington	2nd	80	62	.563	0.5	Lost semi-finals vs. Buffalo 0–3
1999	IL	North	Toronto	Pat Kelly	3rd	73	71	.507	5	Did not qualify
2000	IL	North	Toronto	Pat Kelly; Mel Queen; Omar Malavé	4th	74	66	.529	9.5	Did not qualify
2001	IL	North	Toronto	Omar Malavé	3rd	71	73	.493	21	Did not qualify
2002	IL	North	Toronto	Omar Malavé	4th	64	80	.444	27	Did not qualify
2003	IL	North	Toronto	Omar Malavé	6th	62	79	.440	19.5	Did not qualify
2004	IL	North	Toronto	Marty Pevey	T-5th	66	78	.458	17	Did not qualify
2005	IL	North	Toronto	Marty Pevey	4th	71	73	.493	11	Did not qualify
2006	IL	North	Toronto	Mike Basso	6th	64	79	.448	20.5	Did not qualify
Syracuse Chiefs
2007	IL	North	Toronto	Doug Davis	5th	64	80	.444	20.5	Did not qualify
2008	IL	North	Toronto	Doug Davis	4th	69	73	.486	18	Did not qualify
2009	IL	North	Washington	Tim Foli	2nd	76	68	.528	6.5	Did not qualify
2010	IL	North	Washington	Trent Jewett	2nd	76	67	.531	11	Did not qualify
2011	IL	North	Washington	Randy Knorr	4th	66	74	.471	14	Did not qualify
2012	IL	North	Washington	Tony Beasley	5th	70	74	.486	14	Did not qualify
2013	IL	North	Washington	Tony Beasley	6th	66	78	.458	14.5	Did not qualify
2014	IL	North	Washington	Billy Gardner Jr.	1st	81	62	.566	—	Lost semi-finals vs. Pawtucket, 0–3
2015	IL	North	Washington	Billy Gardner Jr.	4th	66	78	.458	15	Did not qualify
2016	IL	North	Washington	Billy Gardner Jr.	6th	61	82	.427	30	Did not qualify
2017	IL	North	Washington	Billy Gardner Jr.	6th	54	87	.383	32	Did not qualify
2018	IL	North	Washington	Randy Knorr	T-4th	64	76	.449	21	Did not qualify
Syracuse Mets
2019	IL	North	New York (NL)	Tony DeFrancesco	2nd	75	66	.532	1	Did not qualify
2020	IL	North	New York (NL)	N/A	N/A	—	—	—	—	Season cancelled due to COVID-19
2021	AAA East	Northeast	New York (NL)	Chad Kreuter	5th	50	75	.400	28.5	No playoffs held
2022	IL	East	New York (NL)	Kevin Boles	9th	64	85	.430	21.5	Did not qualify
2023	IL	East	New York (NL)	Dick Scott	9th	61	85	.418	27.5	Did not qualify
2024	IL	East	New York (NL)	Dick Scott	3rd	78	71	.523	11	Did not qualify
2025	IL	East	New York (NL)	Dick Scott	5th	77	73	.513	12	Did not qualify
2026	IL	East	New York (NL)	Dick Scott	T-2nd	81	68	.544	9.5	Did not qualify

Regular season champions	League champions	Division champions	Wild Card berth

=== All-time records ===
Note: One playoff series is missing from the original Syracuse Chiefs. It will be added to the records when found.

Statistic	Wins	Losses	Win%	Playoff berths	League championships
Original Syracuse Chiefs (1934–1955)
Regular season record	1659	1718	.491	10	5
Post-season record	62	58	.517	10	5
Regular and post-season record	1721	1776	.492	10	5
Syracuse Chiefs (Eastern League) (1956–1957)
Regular season record	118	161	.423	0	0
Second Syracuse Chiefs / SkyChiefs (1961–2018)
Regular season record	3954	4328	.477	15	3
Post-season record	55	55	.500	15	3
Regular and post-season record	4009	4383	.478	15	3
Syracuse Mets (2019–present)
Regular season record	421	432	.494	0	0
Post-season record	0	0	.000	0	0
Regular and post-season record	421	432	.494	0	0
All-time records (1934–55, 1956–57, 1961–present)
Regular season record	6078	6573	.480	25	8
Post-season record	117	113	.509	25	8
Regular and post-season record	6195	6686	.481	25	8

== Notable people ==
=== Players ===
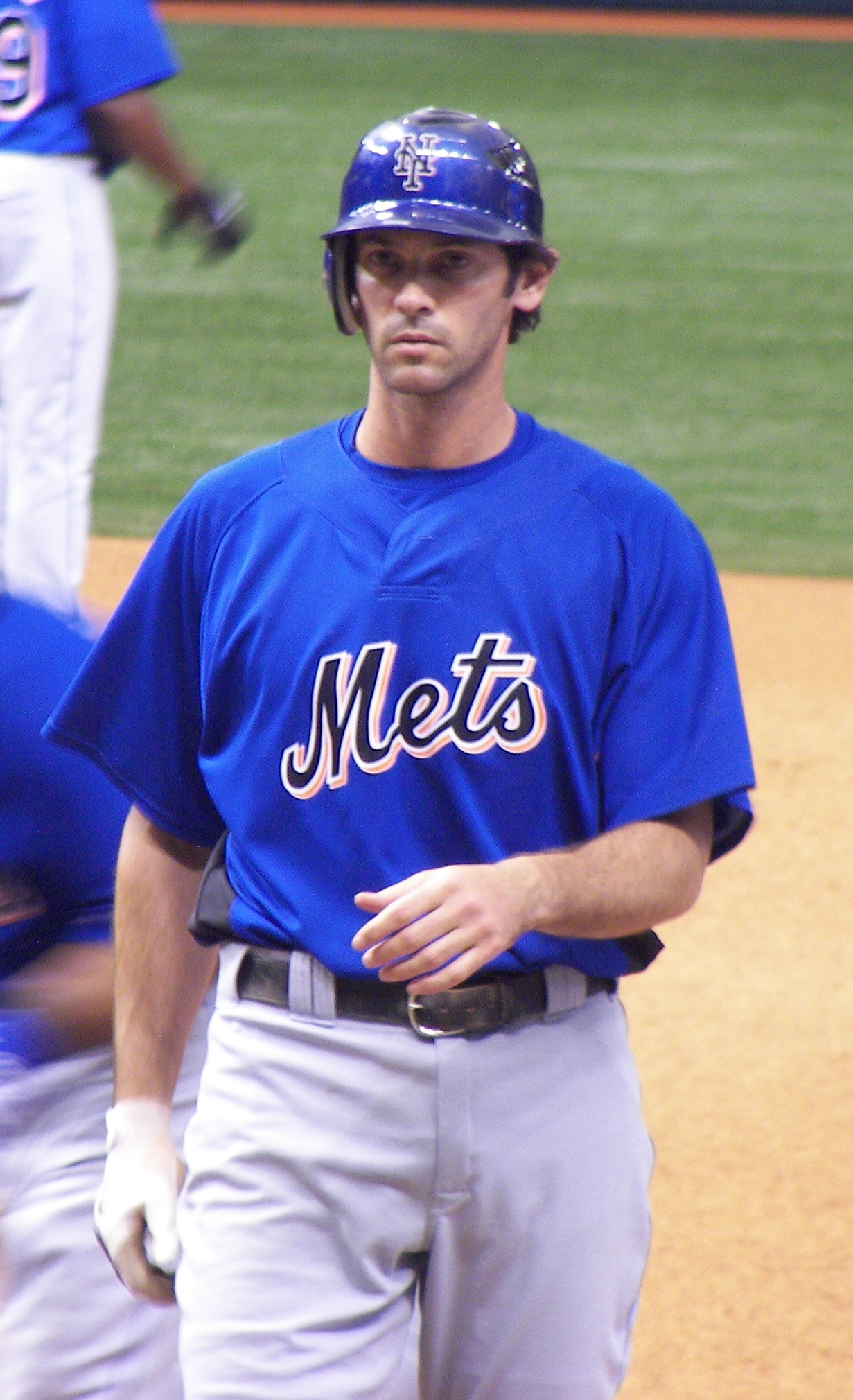
Shawn Green

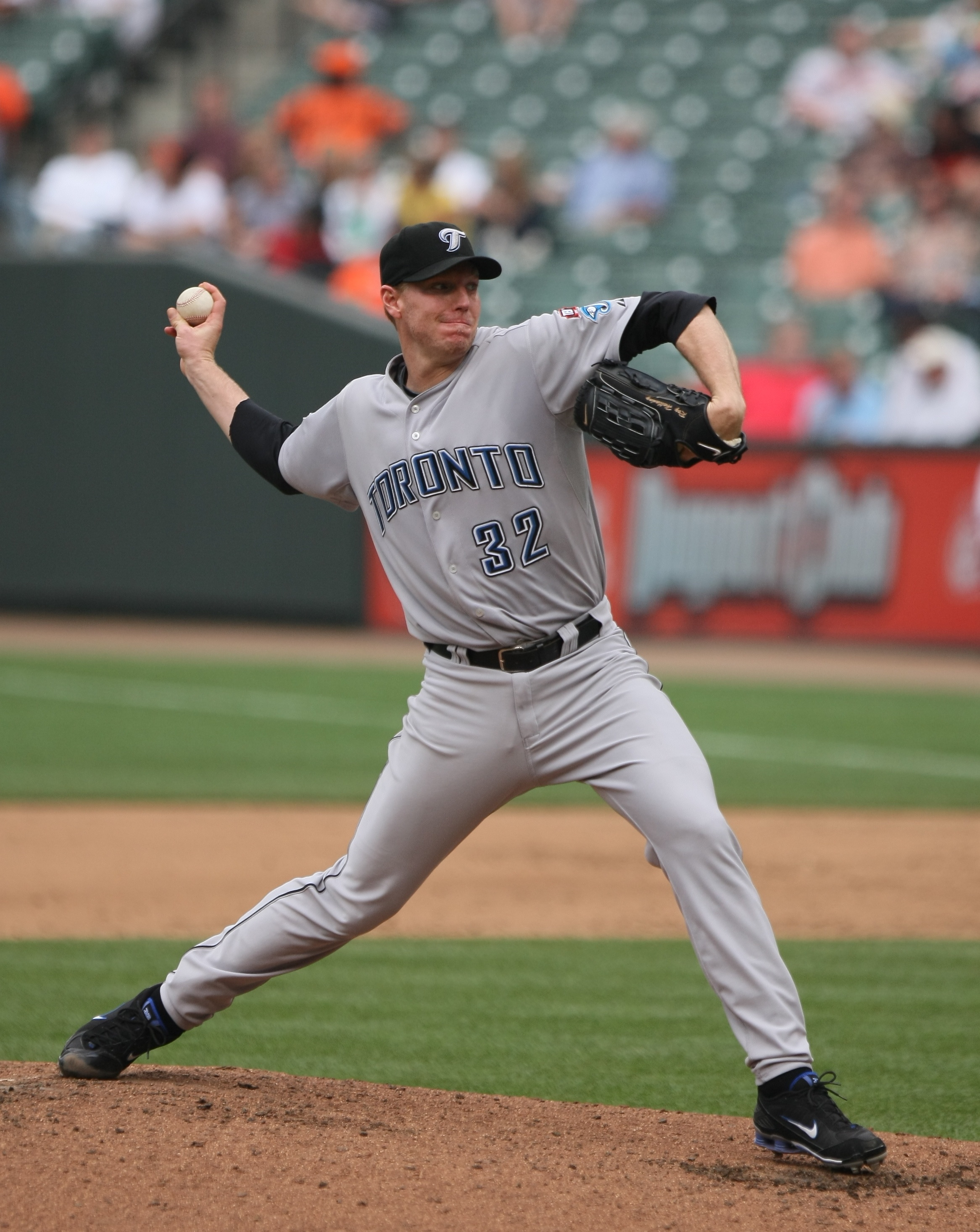
Roy Halladay

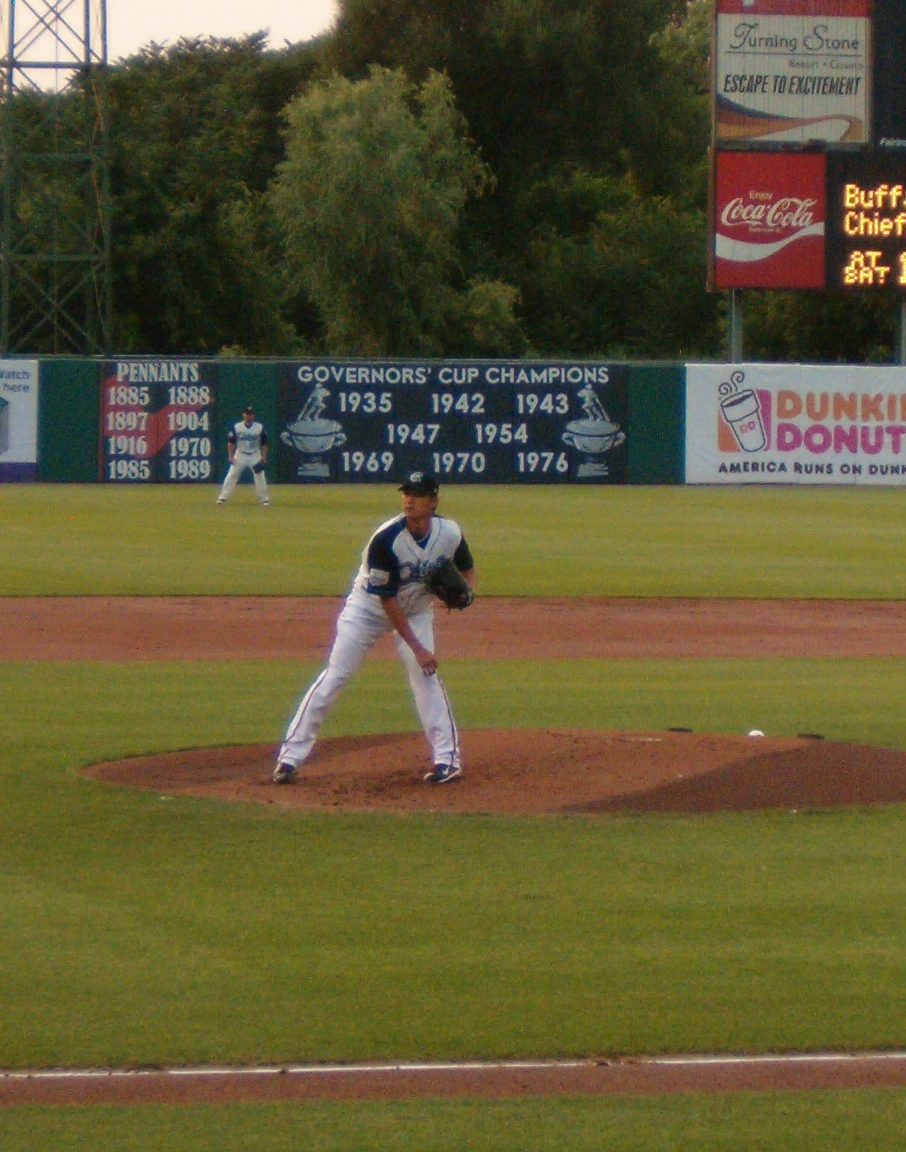
Chien-Ming Wang pitching for the Chiefs, July 2011

- Richard Bleier
- A. J. Burnett
- Robinson Canó
- Chris Carpenter
- Kevin Cash
- Bobby Cox
- Jacob deGrom
- Carlos Delgado
- Tony Fernández
- Lucas Giolito
- Shawn Green
- Carlos Gomez
- Ron Guidry
- Roy Halladay
- Bryce Harper
- Aaron Hill
- Matt Kemp
- Jimmy Key
- Adam Lind
- Gene Locklear
- Fred McGriff
- Denny McLain
- Thurman Munson
- Stu Pederson
- Anthony Rendon
- Alex Ríos
- Víctor Robles
- Goody Rosen
- Deion Sanders
- Hank Sauer
- Max Scherzer
- Travis Snider
- Jhonatan Solano
- Luis Sojo
- Ed Sprague Jr.
- Stephen Strasburg
- Dave Stieb
- Tim Tebow
- Trea Turner
- David Wells
- Vernon Wells
- Jayson Werth

=== Broadcasters ===
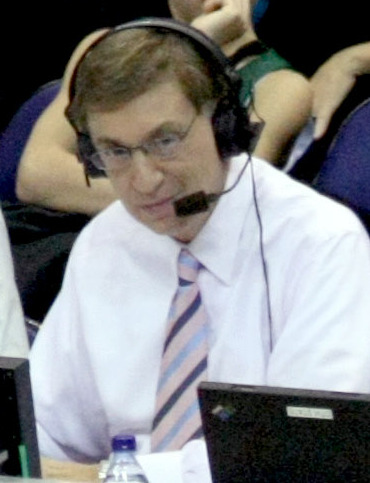
Marv Albert

- Marv Albert (1962)
- Hank Greenwald (1962)
- Greg Papa (1982–83)
- Sean McDonough (1982–84), current ESPN play-by-play man for Major League Baseball, NCAA Men's Basketball, NCAA Football, National Football League and the National Hockey League
- Dan Hoard (1985–95), former Cincinnati Reds fill in broadcaster, now voice of the Cincinnati Bengals
- Ken Levine (1988), film and television writer who also broadcast for the Baltimore Orioles, 1991, Seattle Mariners, 1992–94, 2011–12, San Diego Padres, 1995–1997, Los Angeles Dodgers, 2008–2010
- Matt Vasgersian (1995)
- Bob McElligott (2000–2009), radio broadcaster for the Columbus Blue Jackets
- Jason Benetti (2009–2014), broadcaster for NBC's 'Sunday Night Baseball' & the Detroit Tigers
- Kevin Brown (2010–2017), broadcaster for the Baltimore Orioles
- Evan Stockton (2022–2024)
- Michael Tricarico (2018–2025)
- Jack Gordon (2025–Present)
- Joe Puccio (2026–Present)

=== Retired numbers and recognized people ===
No.	Player	Notes
	Tex Simone	Team founder and former GM
9	Hank Sauer	
42	Jackie Robinson	Retired throughout Baseball

== Game broadcasts ==
Locally games are broadcast on the Mets' flagship radio station, WSKO "The Score" 1260 AM, and globally online via SyracuseMets.com. In addition, all games are broadcast on MiLB.TV, an internet video subscription service. Select games were broadcast live on Spectrum Sports, provided on Spectrum Cable services throughout the Central and Northern New York area until Spectrum ceased operations of its sports channels in the state sometime around 2017. The games on Spectrum Sports were called by Steve Grilli, Syracuse Wall of Fame member and former major leaguer. All games against thruway rivals Rochester or Buffalo were broadcast on Spectrum Sports and fed between the cities, with the host city providing the presentation and announcers.

== In popular culture ==
Writer Ken Levine based the Springfield Isotopes minor league team in The Simpsons episode "Dancin' Homer" on experiences as an announcer for the Syracuse Chiefs. The episode includes references to former announcer Dan Hoard and owner Anthony "Tex" Simone (named Antoine "Tex" O'Hara in the episode).

The Chiefs gained national media attention for a promotion planned for 2014's Tattoo Appreciation Night, where anyone who got a tattoo of their "C" logo would receive free tickets to Chiefs games for life.

== See also ==
- Star Park
- Syracuse Baseball Wall of Fame
- Syracuse Orange baseball
- Syracuse Stars

Preceded by Kansas City Blues (1934)	Boston Red Sox; Double-A affiliate 1936 (with San Diego Padres)	Succeeded by Minneapolis Millers (1938)
