= Frank Verdi =

American baseball player and manager (1926-2010)

- Shortstop
- Born: June 2, 1926; Brooklyn, New York, U.S.
- Died: July 9, 2010 (aged 84); New Port Richey, Florida, U.S.
- Batted: Right Threw: Right

MLB debut
- May 10, 1953, for the New York Yankees

Last MLB appearance
- May 10, 1953, for the New York Yankees

MLB statistics
- Games played: 1
- At bats: 0
- Errors: 0
- Stats at Baseball Reference

Teams
- New York Yankees (1953)

Frank Michael Verdi (June 2, 1926 – July 9, 2010) was an American professional baseball infielder and longtime manager. He spent his career in minor league baseball, except for a single playing appearance in the Major Leagues for the 1953 New York Yankees. As a player, he was listed at 5 feet 11 inches (1.80 m) and 170 pounds (77 kg); he both batted and threw right-handed. He was selected to the Syracuse Baseball Wall of Fame in 1999 and the International League Hall of Fame in 2008.

== Early life and amateur career ==
Verdi graduated from Boys High School in Brooklyn where he played baseball, basketball and soccer. He was a teammate on the basketball team with Donnie Forman. Only Forman and Max Zaslofsky outscored Verdi in the Public Schools Athletic League.

Verdi joined the United States Navy after high school and spent most of his time in the Navy boxing and playing baseball in Virginia. After being discharged from the Navy, he enrolled at New York University (NYU) but signed a contract with the Yankees during his first semester at NYU.

== Playing career ==
Verdi played in the minor league for a total of 18 seasons (1946–1963) mainly with Yankees' farm teams. He spent all or part of 12 seasons at the Triple-A level, where he batted .269 with 21 home runs and 284 RBIs in 996 games.

Verdi was famous for his ability to execute the hidden ball trick. In 1949, as a second baseman for the Binghamton Triplets in the Class A Eastern League, he pulled off the trick seven times in 95 games.

Verdi only appeared in a single MLB game, as a one-inning defensive replacement on May 10, 1953. In a Yankees game against the Boston Red Sox at Fenway Park, Verdi entered the game at shortstop in the bottom of the sixth inning, after Joe Collins had pinch hit for starter Phil Rizzuto. Verdi did not handle any chance in the field. In the top of the seventh inning, Bill Renna pinch hit for Verdi.

Verdi survived a potentially tragic accident on July 25, 1959, when, as a player for the Rochester Red Wings, he was struck in the head by a stray bullet in Havana during a game against the Havana Sugar Kings. Verdi was standing in as the team's third base coach after the ejection of Rochester manager Cot Deal when shooting broke out in the stands. Verdi was still wearing the plastic lining in his baseball cap, in lieu of a batting helmet, and the lining deflected the bullet away from his head; it lodged in his shoulder and caused a minor wound.

== Managing career ==
Verdi made a much larger mark as a minor league manager for 21 seasons (1961–70; 1972; 1974; 1977–85) at the affiliated level. He spent much of that period in the Yankees' farm system, winning Triple-A International League championships in 1969 and 1970 (with the Syracuse Chiefs) and in 1981 (with the Columbus Clippers). He won the International League Manager of the Year Award in 1970. Verdi also managed the New York Mets' Tidewater Tides for four seasons (1977–80) and the Baltimore Orioles' Rochester Red Wings farm club from 1984 through June 16, 1985, and spent brief managing stints in the Houston Astros, Minnesota Twins and Washington Senators organizations. His record as a manager was 1,351 wins and 1,332 losses (.504).

After his managerial career with affiliated minor league teams, Verdi managed in independent leagues during the 1990s. In winter ball, he skippered the Indios de Mayagüez of the Puerto Rico Baseball League from 1984 to 1985, and had previously managed the Leones de Ponce team to the league championship in the 1971–72 season.

== Personal life ==
A son, Mike Verdi, was also a minor league manager.

Verdi died in New Port Richey, Florida, at the age of 84 in 2010.

== Sources ==
- Johnson, Lloyd, ed., The Minor League Register. Durham, North Carolina: Baseball America, 1994.
