= Robert Samuel Decosta Higgins =

American surgeon

Robert Samuel Decosta Higgins MD, MSHA, is an American surgeon working with heart–lung transplants. He is president and chief academic officer at Rush University in Chicago.

== Education ==
Higgins earned his bachelor's degree from Dartmouth College and medical degree from Yale School of Medicine. He completed his residency in general surgery and served as chief resident at the University Hospitals of Pittsburgh. He was a Winchester Scholar and fellow in cardiothoracic surgery at the Yale School of Medicine. He earned a master's degree in health services administration at Virginia Commonwealth University.

== Career ==
Higgins became president and chief academic officer for Rush University and the chief clinical and academic officer and senior vice president for Rush University System for Health in April 2024. He previously served as president of Brigham and Women's Hospital and executive vice president at Mass General Brigham, roles he assumed in December 2021.

Higgins joined the Brigham from Johns Hopkins Hospital, where he served as director of the Department of Surgery and surgeon-in-chief, as well as the William Stewart Halsted Professor of Surgery at Johns Hopkins School of Medicine. He is the first African-American director of the Department of Surgery at Johns Hopkins.

Prior to Hopkins, Higgins served as Department of Surgery chair and director of the Comprehensive Transplant Center at The Ohio State University Medical Center from 2010 to 2015. He has served in numerous national professional leadership roles, including president of the Society of Thoracic Surgeons (2019-2020), president of the United Network for Organ Sharing (2009-2010), president of the Society of Black Academic Surgeons (2008-2009), and president of the American College of Surgeons Society of Surgical Chairs (2019-2020) and as a member of the Board of Directors of the American Board of Thoracic Surgery. Most recently, he was elected to the Johns Hopkins School of Medicine Alpha Omega Alpha chapter and was awarded the Fellowship Ad Hominem of the Royal College of Surgeons of Edinburgh. He has authored more than 200 scientific articles and book chapters.

Higgins has also served as a senior registrar in transplantation at Papworth Hospital, the United Kingdom's largest cardiothoracic surgical program and its main heart-lung transplant center. He also served as a major in the U.S. Army Reserve Medical Corps for 13 years and while doing so, supported the Richmond Veterans Administration transplantation program.

Higgins is a founding board member of the International Center for Genetic Disease at Brigham and Women's Hospital, Harvard Medical School, which focuses on the analysis of patients and healthy subjects from different parts of the world for genetics research into human disease and health.
