= Bob Higgins (trumpeter) =

American jazz trumpeter (1925–2023)

Robert Irving Higgins (April 21, 1925 – April 15, 2023) was an American jazz trumpeter and songwriter who played with Les Brown. He also had a lengthy career as a businessman.

== Biography ==
Higgins was born in Cabarton, Idaho on April 21, 1925. He served in World War II, being conscripted at the age of 18. As a songwriter he was best known for the songs "High on a Windy Trumpet" and "Lovers Leap", the latter of which was recorded by Louis Armstrong. As a businessman, Higgins served as President of the International Division of Denny’s Inc. during the 1980s. In 1993, Robert and his wife Marisela Higgins relocated to Laredo, Texas, to start a chain of El Pollo Loco restaurants with a friend, Taco Palenque owner Juan Francisco Ochoa. In December 1998, the couple founded a spa called Studio 55. Later, Marisela and Robert Higgins were recognized as Junior Achievement of Laredo Laureates and inducted into the Laredo Business Hall of Fame in 2011. A year later, Studio 55 was chosen by the American edition of the international beauty magazine, Les Nouvelles Esthetiques & Spa, as Spa of the Month of October, with a five-page article and several pictures.

He and his wife resided in Tokyo, Japan, for about three years, where they had their daughter, Alexa, in 1991. Higgins died in Laredo, Texas on April 15, 2023, at the age of 97.
