= Robert Higgins (baseball) =

Negro league baseball player

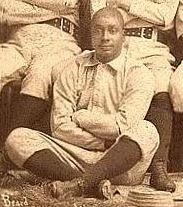
- Pitcher and Leftfielder
- Born: 1867
- Died: Unknown
- Batted: Unknown Threw: Left

debut
- 1887, for the Syracuse Stars

Robert Higgins was an American professional baseball player who played for the Syracuse Stars in 1887 and 1888. Higgins was African-American.

He signed with the club at age 20 in 1887. In 1887, he went 20–7 with a 2.90 ERA. He also hit .294 and stole 28 bases over the course of 41 games. In 1888, he went 17–7 with a 2.56 ERA and batted .225. The Stars went on to win the International League title that year. The following offseason, Higgins moved to Memphis, Tennessee and ran his own barber shop for years. He made a comeback in 1896 with the Cuban Giants, which was his only season in the Negro Leagues.

He was added to the Syracuse Baseball Wall of Fame at the Syracuse Mets' field in 2023.
